= Super Singer Junior season 3 =

Super Singer Junior
- Season 3

Release
- Original network: STAR Vijay
- Original release: 17 October 2011 – 26 October 2012

Season chronology
- ← Previous; Season 2

The third season of Airtel Super Singer Junior - Thamizhagathin Chellakuralukkana Thedal ('the search for the sweet voice of Tamil Nadu') premiered on 17 October 2011 and 26 October 2012. The music competition reality TV show was again telecast on Vijay TV, and Bharti Airtel returned to sponsor the show. Episodes were telecast between Monday to Friday each week at 9:00pm. Children from the age of 6 years to the age of 14 years were permitted to audition to showcase their talent on Vijay TV's platform. Apart from gaining recognition from acclaimed names of the music industry and being a child singing icon, the show promised that its winner would be honored with a 3-bedroom Villa worth Rs.60 lakhs from its sponsor, Arun Excello Temple Green Township. Aajeedh Khalique was crowned the winner of Airtel Super Singer Junior Season 3. Pragathy Guruprasad was the first runner up.

Ananth Vaidyanathan returned as a permanent voice trainer, and playback singers K. S. Chithra, Mano, and Malgudi Subha returned as permanent judges during the main competition rounds of the show. Makapa Anand, Kalyani Nair, and Bhavana Balakrishnan were hosts for the season. A number of eminent playback singers and music directors appeared during the season as guest judges, including P. B. Sreenivas, M. S. Viswanathan, P. Susheela, S. Janaki, Sadhana Sargam, Nithyasree Mahadevan, Sudha Raghunathan, Sowmya, Aruna Sairam, Pushpavanam Kuppuswamy, Rajkumar Bharathi, and Bombay Sisters. Stars from the senior version of the show also appeared as judges during the season, including former contestants, and permanent judge P. Unnikrishnan.

== Launch week (season 3) ==
The grand opening week was hosted by actresses and television anchors, Kalyani and Ramya. Judges throughout launch week were Manikka Vinayagam, S. P. Sailaja, Pushpavanam Kuppuswamy, and Mahathi.

No.	Original release date
1	17 October 2011
After playing footage of Airtel Super Singer 3 winner Saicharan being honoured with his prize, semi-finalists Srinisha, Priyanka, Srikanth, and Shravan from Airtel Super Singer Junior (season 2) performed in this episode to promote and celebrate the opening of season 3 of the show. Child actress Sara made a special guest appearance during this episode following her performance in the 2011 Tamil language film, Deiva Thirumagal.
2	18 October 2011
Actor Sivakarthikeyan, a former host of Airtel Super Singer 3, appeared as a special guest host during this episode. Winners of Jodi Junior, Madan and Gabriela, performed a dance routine before former finalist from Airtel Super Singer Junior (season 2) performed the song Pattatthu Rani. Former contestants of Junior Superstars, Nikhil and Rakshitha sung Yemmadi Aathaadi. Audition judges from the episode performed, and judged a few auditions, and footage from ground level auditions which took place in certain villages in Tamil Nadu judged by Airtel Super Singer 2008 contestant Prasanna was also telecast.
3	19 October 2011
Contestants who had given auditions in previous seasons came in for auditions this year to get a chance to get into the competition. Former contestants of Junior Superstars, Balasarangan and Lakshmi sang the song "Swaasame Swaasame", and semi-finalist Srinisha from Airtel Super Singer Junior (season 2) sang the song "Rahathula Rahathula".
4	20 October 2011
Semi-finalist Priyanka from Airtel Super Singer Junior (season 2) sang "Chinna Thaayaval" after which it was revealed she recorded her second song as a playback singer for music director D. Imman. Runner-up from that season, Shravan, also sang the song "Something Something" in between the several auditions which took place, and the footage from ground level auditions in Tamil Nadu village Kancheepuram was also telecast.
5	21 October 2011
Great-granddaughters of D. K. Pattammal, Tejashree and Tanujashree, appeared with their mother Nithyasree Mahadevan, as special guests in this episode. Tejashree and Tanujashree gave their debut performance for Vijay TV singing Papanasam Sivan's composition "Engal Naatu" to conclude the launch week, before passing an inpromptu test set by judges Pushpavanam Kuppuswamy and Manikka Vinayagam. Prior to their appearance, actor Mirchi Senthil also briefly appeared as a special guest to promote the soon-to-be released Vijay TV serial, Saravanan Meenatchi; several former contestants of Junior Superstars, including Roshan, Parvati, Balasarangan, Lakshmi, Rakshita and Nikhil performed the song "Thaiya Thaiya"; and familiar contestants from earlier seasons of Airtel Super Singer Junior who could not get into the show in last seasons came in for a special audition to see if they directly qualified for main level auditions.

== Auditions (season 3) ==
Auditions took place in Chennai, Coimbatore, and Trichy.

=== Open auditions in Tamil Nadu ===
Open auditions were held across Tamil Nadu.

The ground level auditions in Trichy and Coimbatore were judged by former contestants of Airtel Super Singer 2, being Ajeesh, Prasanna, Srinivas and Ragini.

The ground level auditions in Chennai were judged by former winners and finalists from each season of the senior version of the show, Airtel Super Singer, including Nikhil Mathew and Anitha from season 1, Ajeesh, Raginisri, and Prasanna, from season 2, as well as Saicharan, Santhosh Hariharan, Sathyaprakash, Pooja, and Malavika from season 3.

Episode #	Title	Audition Judges	Original release date
6–7	"Trichy Auditions (first level)"	Nithyasree Mahadevan, S. P. Sailaja, or Pushpavanam Kuppuswamy	24 October 2011 - 25 October 2011
First round auditions which were held in Trichy required auditioning contestants to perform a song before a single audition judge. Contestants were either spot-selected, rejected, or wait-listed until the conclusion of the round. This round was hosted by Makapa Anand and Bhavana.
8, 9 and 10	"Trichy Auditions (second level)"	Nithyasree Mahadevan, S. P. Sailaja, and Pushpavanam Kuppuswamy	26 October 2011 - 28 October 2011
Second round auditions which were held in Trichy required auditioning contestants to perform a song before a panel of three audition judges. Contestants were either spot-selected, rejected, or wait-listed until the conclusion of the round. The 21 waitlisted auditioning contestants were given training by permanent voice trainer Ananth Vaidyanathan after which they were asked to perform to demonstrate their learning capacity; the voice trainer selected 5 of the waitlisted auditioning contestants. This round was hosted by Makapa Anand, and Bhavana who failed to announce the total count of children or selections.
11–12	"Coimbatore Auditions (first level)"	Nithyasree Mahadevan, Manikka Vinayagam, or Mahathi	31 October 2011 - 1 November 2011
First round auditions which were held in Coimbatore required auditioning contestants to perform a song before a single audition judge. Contestants were either spot-selected, rejected, or wait-listed until the conclusion of the round. 45 out of 100 auditioning contestants were selected from this level of auditions. This round was hosted by actress Kalyani and Anandakannan.
13, 14, and 15	"Coimbatore Auditions (second level)"	Nithyasree Mahadevan, Pushpavanam Kuppuswamy, Manikka Vinayagam, and Mahathi	2 November 2011 - 4 November 2011
Second round auditions which were held in Coimbatore required auditioning contestants to perform a song before a panel of four judges. Contestants were either spot-selected, rejected, or wait-listed until the conclusion of the round. Waitlisted auditioning contestants were given training by permanent voice trainer Ananth Vaidyanathan after which they were asked to perform to demonstrate their learning capacity; the voice trainer made selections after those performances. 27 auditioning contestants were selected from Coimbatore. In total, it was announced 58 auditioning contestants were selected from both Coimbatore and Trichy, and that it was intended that the 31 auditioning contestants shortlisted from Trichy was intended to be further shortlisted to 15. This round was hosted by actress Kalyani and Anandakannan.
16–17	"Chennai Auditions (first level)"	Nithyasree Mahadevan, Mahathi, S. P. Sailaja, or Pushpavanam Kuppuswamy	7 November 2011 - 8 November 2011
First round auditions which were held in Chennai required auditioning contestants to perform a song before a single audition judge. Contestants were either spot-selected, rejected, or wait-listed until the conclusion of the round. This round was hosted by actress Ramya and Makapa Anand.
18, 19, and 20	"Chennai Auditions (second level)"	Pushpavanam Kuppuswamy, Nithyasree Mahadevan, and Mahathi; or Manikka Vinayagam, S. P. Sailaja, and Sowmya	9 November 2011 - 11 November 2011
Second round auditions which were held in Chennai required 235 auditioning contestants to perform a song before one of two panels each with three judges. Contestants were either spot-selected, rejected, or wait-listed until the conclusion of the round, with a total of 40 contestants to be selected by the conclusion of the round. Waitlisted auditioning contestants were given training by permanent voice trainer Ananth Vaidyanathan after which they were asked to perform to demonstrate their learning capacity; the voice trainer made selections after those performances. This round was hosted by actress Ramya and Makapa Anand.

=== Main level auditions ===
All main level auditions were held in Chennai.

Episode #	Title	Audition Judges	Original release date
21, 22, 23	"Main Level Auditions (round 1)"	Nithyasree Mahadevan, Pushpavanam Kuppuswamy, S. P. Sailaja, Devan Ekambaram, and Pop Shalini	14 November 2011 - 16 November 2011
First round main level auditions were held in Chennai required auditioning contestants to perform a song and impress a panel of five audition judges within 120 seconds. Contestants were either spot-selected, rejected, or wait-listed until the conclusion of the round. Waitlisted auditioning contestants were given training by permanent voice trainer Ananth Vaidyanathan after which they were asked to perform to demonstrate their learning capacity; the voice trainer made selections after those performances. This round was hosted by Makapa Anand and Ramya.
24, 25	"Main Level Auditions (round 2)"	Nithyasree Mahadevan, Devan Ekambaram, S. P. Sailaja, Pushpavanam Kuppuswamy, and Mahathi	17 November 2011 - 18 November 2011
Second round main level auditions were held in Chennai required auditioning contestants to perform a song and impress a panel of five audition judges within 120 seconds. Contestants were either spot-selected, rejected, or wait-listed until the conclusion of the round. Waitlisted auditioning contestants were given training by permanent voice trainer Ananth Vaidyanathan after which they were asked to perform to demonstrate their learning capacity; the voice trainer made selections after those performances. At the conclusion of this round, 60 contestants were selected. This round was hosted by Makapa Anand and Ramya.
26, 27, 28, 29, 30	"Final Level Auditions"	Nithyasree Mahadevan, Mahathi, S. P. Sailaja, Pushpavanam Kuppuswamy, and Pop Shalini	21 November 2011 - 25 November 2011
Third round main level auditions were held in Chennai required the 60 auditioning contestants to perform a song and compete with two other auditioning contestants, and impress a panel of five audition judges. Contestants were either spot-selected, rejected, or wait-listed until the conclusion of the round. Waitlisted auditioning contestants were given training by permanent voice trainer Ananth Vaidyanathan after which they were asked to perform to demonstrate their learning capacity; the voice trainer made selections after those performances. At the conclusion of this round, the list of 60 contestants would be further shortlisted to 30 finalists. This round was hosted by Deepak and Divyadarshini.

== Finalists ==
Aajeedh Khalique (winner)

== Finals ==
=== Main Competition Performance Rounds ===
==== Introduction Round (28 November 2011 – 2 December 2011) ====
- Hosts: Kalyani and Makapa Anand
- Special Guest Audition Judges: Nithyasree Mahadevan, S. P. Sailaja, and Pushpavanam Kuppuswamy
- Permanent Judges: Malgudi Subha, Mano, and K. S. Chithra
- Permanent voice trainer: Ananth Vaidyanathan
- Performances:

Special guest audition judges appeared on the show to introduce the 30 selected finalists, while the permanent judges returned to greet the selected contestants for the first time.

==== Fast Songs Round (5 December 2011 – 9 December 2011) ====
- Hosts: Kalyani and Ramya
- Permanent Judges: K. S. Chithra, Mano, and Malgudi Subha
- Permanent voice trainer: Ananth Vaidyanathan
- Performances:

Episodes 36 to 40.

==== Rajini Hits Round (12 December 2011 – 16 December 2011) ====
- Hosts: Kalyani and Makapa Anand
- Permanent Judges: K. S. Chithra, Mano, and Malgudi Subha
- Permanent voice trainer: Ananth Vaidyanathan
- Performances:

Episodes 41 to 45.

==== Koothu Songs Round (19 December 2011 – 23 December 2011) ====
- Hosts: Kalyani and Makapa Anand
- Special Guest Judge: Pushpavanam Kuppuswamy
- Permanent Judges: K. S. Chithra and Malgudi Subha
- Permanent voice trainer: Ananth Vaidyanathan
- Performances:

Episodes 46 to 50.

==== Christmas and New Year Special: Western Songs Round (26 December 2011 – 30 December 2011) ====
- Hosts: Sivakarthikeyan and Makapa Anand
- Permanent Judges: K. S. Chithra, Mano, and Malgudi Subha
- Permanent voice trainer & Santa: Ananth Vaidyanathan
- Performances:

Episodes 51 to 55.

==== Hits Of 2011 Round (2 January 2012 – 6 January 2012) ====
- Hosts: Makapa Anand and Bhavana
- Permanent Judges: Mano and Malgudi Subha
- Permanent voice trainer & Santa: Ananth Vaidyanathan
- Performances:

Episodes 56 to 60.

==== Folk Songs Round (9 January 2012 – 13 January 2012) ====
- Hosts: Makapa Anand and Bhavana
- Permanent Judges: Mano and Malgudi Subha
- Permanent voice trainer: Ananth Vaidyanathan
- Performances:

Episodes 61 to 65.

==== Rain Songs Round (16 January 2012 – 20 January 2012) ====
- Hosts: Makapa Anand and Bhavana
- Permanent Judges: Mano and Malgudi Subha
- Permanent voice trainer: Ananth Vaidyanathan
- Performances:

Episodes 66 to 70.

==== Other Language Songs Round (23 January 2012 – 27 January 2012) ====
- Hosts: Makapa Anand and Bhavana
- Permanent Judges: Mano, K. S. Chitra, and Malgudi Subha
- Permanent voice trainer: Ananth Vaidyanathan
- Performances:

Episodes 71 to 75.

==== Semi-Classical Round (30 January 2012 – 3 February 2012) ====
- Hosts: Makapa Anand and Bhavana
- Permanent Judges: Mano, K. S. Chitra, and Malgudi Subha
- Permanent voice trainer: Ananth Vaidyanathan
- Performances:

Episodes 76 to 80.

==== Nenjil Nindra Raagangal Round (6 February 2012 – 10 February 2012) ====
- Hosts: Makapa Anand and Bhavana
- Permanent Judges: Mano, K. S. Chitra, and Malgudi Subha
- Permanent voice trainer: Ananth Vaidyanathan
- Performances:

Episodes 81 to 85.

==== Valentine's Week: Dedication Round (13 February 2012 – 17 January 2012) ====
- Hosts: Makapa Anand and Bhavana
- Permanent Judges: Mano, K. S. Chitra, and Malgudi Subha
- Permanent voice trainer: Ananth Vaidyanathan
- Performances:

Episodes 86 to 90.

==== Classical Round (20 August 2012 – 24 August 2012) ====
- Hosts: Makapa Anand and Bhavana
- Special Guest Performance by: special guest judge Nithyasree Mahadevan (vocal) and actress Sukanya (dance)
- Special Guest Judges: Bombay Sisters, Rajkumar Bharathi, Sudha Raghunathan, Aruna Sairam, and Nithyasree Mahadevan
- Special Guest Instrumentalists: Rajhesh Vaidhya (veena), Umashankar (ghatam), K.L. Vijay (flute), Ramakrishnan (mridangam), Madhu (tabla), Chitti Prakash (vibraphone), and Biju (keyboard)
- Permanent Judge: P. Unnikrishnan
- Permanent voice trainer: Ananth Vaidyanathan
- Performances:

– Non-competition performance
– Highlight performance

This round required the top 7 contestants to sing songs which fitted in the Carnatic music ("classical") genre. This week's orchestra accompanying the contestants consisted of 7 special guest performers (instrumentalists). The best Carnatic singer title of the season was also promised to the best performing contestant of the week.

At the conclusion of this week's performances, the 7 special guest judges decided not to eliminate any contestant based on this week's performances. Consequently, the scores would be carried over to the next week, and a decision would then be made as to which contestant would be eliminated.

Air date	Order	Non-contestant performer	Contestant(s)	Song	Original artist	Lyricist	Music director	Movie (year)
20 August 2012
20 August 2012	1		SSJ10 Gowtham	"Mudhal Mudhal Raaga Deepam"	S. P. Balasubrahmanyam	Muthulingam	Ilaiyaraaja	Payanangal Mudivathillai (1982)
20 August 2012	2		SSJ06 Anu	"Maraindhirundhu Paakum"	P. Susheela	Kannadasan	K. V. Mahadevan	Thillana Mohanambal (1968)
20 August 2012	3		SSJ07 Sukanya	"Ezhu Swarangalukkul"	Vani Jayaram	Kannadasan	M. S. Viswanathan	Apoorva Raagangal (1975)
21 August 2012
21 August 2012	1		SSJ06 Anu	"Sri Ranga Ranganathanin"	S. P. Balasubrahmanyam; Uma Ramanan; Shobana Vignesh	Vaali	Ilaiyaraaja	Mahanadi (1994)
21 August 2012	2		SSJ07 Suganya	"Sowkiyamaa Kannae"	Nithyasree Mahadevan	Vairamuthu	A. R. Rahman	Sangamam (1999)
21 August 2012	3	Nithyasree Mahadevan	none (solo special)	excerpt from virutthams "Vaanathin Meedhu" and "Sooriyan Vandhu"	Nithyasree Mahadevan	Ramalinga Swamigal; Vairamuthu	(Traditional); A. R. Rahman	Sangamam (1999); (traditional)
21 August 2012	4	Shravan R. Pratap	none (solo special)	Om Namo Narayana	Traditional composition in raga Karnaranjani	Ambujam Krishna	Charumathi Ramachandran	Traditional
21 August 2012	5		SSJ01 Jeyanth	"Avaloru Menagai"	S. P. Balasubrahmanyam	Vaali	Shankar–Ganesh	Natchathiram (1980)
22 August 2012
22 August 2012	1		SSJ03 Anjana	"Kanda Naal Mudhalaal"	Subiksha & Pooja	Remix of Carnatic song, written and composed by N. S. Chidambaram	Yuvan Shankar Raja	Kanda Naal Mudhal (2005)
22 August 2012	2	Sudha Raghunathan	none (solo special)	excerpt from "Kanda Naal"	Sudha Raghunathan	N. S. Chidambaram	Traditional	Traditional
22 August 2012	3		SSJ01 Jeyanth	"Nadha Vinodhangal"	S. P. Balasubrahmanyam & S. P. Sailaja	Vairamuthu	Ilaiyaraaja	Salangai Oli (1983)
22 August 2012	4		SSJ09 Yazhini	"Kaatrodu Kuzhalin"	K. S. Chithra	Pulamaipithan	Ilaiyaraaja	Kodai Mazhai (1986)
22 August 2012	5		SSJ04 Pragathi	"Mannavan Vanthanadi"	P. Susheela	Kannadasan	K. V. Mahadevan	Thiruvarutchelvar (1967)
23 August 2012
23 August 2012	1	Nithyasree Mahadevan (with Bharatha Natyam dance by actress Sukanya)		"Ramanukku Mannan"	Nithyasree Mahadevan	Arunachala Kavi	Traditional	Traditional Carnatic music composition
23 August 2012	2		SSJ09 Yazhini	"Ninnaichcharan Adainthen"	Bombay Jayashri	Subramania Bharathi	Ilaiyaraaja	Bharathi (2000)
23 August 2012	3		SSJ04 Pragathi	"Shivashankari"	Ghantasala	Pingali Nagendra Rao	Pendyala Nageswara Rao	Jagadeka Veeruni Katha (1961)
23 August 2012	4		SSJ10 Gowtham	"Ullathil Nalla"	Seerkazhi Govindarajan	Kannadasan	Viswanathan–Ramamoorthy	Karnan (1964)
23 August 2012	5		SSJ03 Anjana	"Thunbam Nergaiyil"	M. S. Rajeswari & V. J. Varma	Bharathidasan	R. Sudharsanam	Or Iravu (1980)
24 August 2012
24 August 2012	1		SSJ04 Pragathi	"Yellam Inbamayam"	M. L. Vasanthakumari & P. Leela		C. R. Subburaman	Manamagal (1951)
24 August 2012	2		SSJ10 Gowtham	"Bikshai Paathiram"	Madhu Balakrishnan	Ilaiyaraaja	Ilaiyaraaja	Naan Kadavul (2009)
24 August 2012	3		SSJ07 Suganya	"Ennai Yenna"	Sudha Raghunathan	Vaali	Ilaiyaraja	Ivan (2002)
24 August 2012	4	Sudha Raghunathan	SSJ07 Suganya	excerpt from "Ennai Yenna"	Sudha Raghunathan	Vaali	Ilaiyaraja	Ivan (2002)
24 August 2012	5	(repeat)	SSJ04 Pragathi	"Shivashankari"	Ghantasala	Pingali Nagendra Rao	Pendyala Nageswara Rao	Jagadeka Veeruni Katha (1961)
24 August 2012	6	(repeat)	SSJ07 Sukanya	"Ezhu Swarangalukkul"	Vani Jayaram	Kannadasan	M. S. Viswanathan	Apoorva Raagangal (1975)
24 August 2012	7	(repeat)	SSJ10 Gowtham	"Ullathil Nalla"	Seerkazhi Govindarajan	Kannadasan	Viswanathan–Ramamoorthy	Karnan (1964)
