= Super Singer 5 =

- Season 5
- Presented by: Makapa Anand, Priyanka Deshpande, & Bhavana Balakrishnan
- Judges: Srinivas, Unnikrishnan, Usha Uthup & Mano

Release
- Original network: STAR Vijay
- Original release: 1 June 2015 – 18 March 2016

Season chronology
- ← Previous; Super Singer 4 Next → Super Singer 6

Airtel Super Singer 5 – Thamizhagathil Brahmaanda Kuralukkaana Thedal, the fifth season of the Airtel Super Singer show, is a reality-based Indian singing competition in Tamil language that aired on Vijay TV. It was designed to be a talent hunt to find the best voice of Tamil Nadu. The show premiered on 1 June 2015, and episodes were telecasted on weekdays each week at 9:30 pm. Persons above the age of 16 years were permitted to audition to showcase their talent on Vijay TV's platform. This program was sponsored by Airtel.

The show was hosted by Makapa Anand, Priyanka Deshpande, and Bhavana Balakrishnan. For the performance rounds by the top 30 contestants, voice trainer Ananth Vaidyanathan appeared fairly regularly on the show. Playback Singers, Usha Uthup, Mano, Srinivas and P. Unnikrishnan returned as permanent judges who appeared regularly throughout the show. The third permanent judge of the show consisted of appearances by either former junior season judge, Usha Uthup, or current junior season judge, Mano, while the show necessarily continues to seek a suitable replacement. Following the request of viewers, Sujatha Mohan ceased her regular permanent judge appointment, but occasionally attended to judge contestant performances.

Special guest judges or guest performers who appeared on the show during the season consisted of a variety of eminent playback singers and music directors, including P. Susheela, Vani Jairam, S. P. Balasubrahmanyam, Vairamuthu, S.P. Sailaja, Nithyasree Mahadevan, Sudha Raghunathan, Sikkil Gurucharan, Pushpavanam Kuppuswamy, S. Sowmya, T. L. Maharajan, Gana Bala, Velmurugan, Chinnaponnu, Vijay Prakash, as well as stars from the junior version of the show, such as permanent judges K.S. Chithra and Malgudi Subha, and former contestants of prior seasons of the show.

== Auditions ==
Ground auditions were held in the cities of Chennai, Coimbatore, and Trichy. Ground level auditions were telecast from 2 June 2015. Preliminary round auditions were telecast from 3 June 2015.

The auditions were held in various parts of Tamil Nadu, and were telecast until 3 July 2015. First round audition judges included season 3 winner Saicharan, season 4 winner Diwakar, and former contestants from those seasons such as Sathyaprakash, Pooja Vaidyanath, Santhosh Hariharan, and Sonia. Second and third round audition judges included S. P. Charan, Pushpavanam Kuppuswamy, Devan Ekambaram, James Vasanthan, Mahathi, Sowmya, and Shalini. Zonal audition judges were permanent judges from the junior version of the show, Malgudi Subha, Mano, and K.S. Chithra. A total of 33 contestants were selected for the finals, including local, international, and former contestants.

== Finalists ==
- Anand Aravindakshan (contestant ID SS05 Entered Finals)
- Fareedha M (contestant ID SS02 Entered Finals)
- Rajaganapathy G (contestant ID SS03 Entered Finals)
- Siyad K (contestant ID SS04 Entered Finals)
- Lakshmi Pradeep (contestant ID SS07 Entered Finals)
- Priya jerson (contestant ID SS06)
- Sowmya (contestant ID SS12)
- Arjun adapalli (contestant ID SS01)
- Nirujan S (contestant ID SS10)
- Latha Krishna R (contestant ID SS08)
- Arvind Mukundan (contestant ID SS09)
- Irwin Victoria Thomas (contestant ID SS11)

== Finals ==
=== Main Competition Performance Rounds ===
==== Tribute to MSV Round (28 July 2015 – 1 August 2015) ====
- Special Guest Judge: Vani Jairam

==== Classical Songs Round (12 November 2015 – 15 November 2015) ====
- Special Guest Judges: Nithyasree Mahadevan, Sudha Raghunathan, & Sikkil Gurucharan
- Permanent Judge: Unnikrishnan

This round required the contestants to perform songs of a Carnatic classical music genre. Viewers agreed with judges that the round held during this season outmatched previous seasons in terms of orchestra, judging panel, and overall talent.

==== Top 5 Selection Round (12 January 2016 – 15 January 2016) ====
- Permanent Host:

The top 6 remaining contestants were required to perform.

At the conclusion of the round, was eliminated.

==== Top 5 Celebration Round (19 January 2016 – 23 January 2016) ====
- Permanent Host:

The top 5 remaining contestants performed against top 5 contestants from seasons 3 and 4, as well as seasons 2, 3, and 4 of the junior version of the show.

==== Quarterfinals (26 January 2016 – 30 January 2016) ====
- Permanent Host:

==== Semi Finals Round (2 February 2016 – 11 February 2016) ====
- Permanent Host:

=== Wildcard Rounds & SS Awards ===
==== Wildcard Entry Round (16 February 2016 – 17 February 2016) ====
- Host:

==== Wildcard Performance Round (18 February 2016 – 27 February 2016) ====
- Host:

==== Super Singer Awards & Wildcard Results (1 March 2016 – 9 March 2016) ====
- Host:

==== Wildcard Tiebreaker (9 March 2016 – 10 March 2016) ====
- Host:

=== Prefinal Rounds ===
==== Strings Unplugged Round (10 March 2016 – 11 March 2016) ====
- Permanent Host:

==== Super Singers Perform Live (12 March 2016) ====
- Permanent Host:

==== Set Finals (14 March 2016 – 17 March 2016) ====
- Permanent Host: Makapa Anand & Priyanka Deshpande

=== Live Grand Finale (18 March 2016) ===
- Permanent Hosts: Priyanka Deshpande, Makapa Anand, & Bhavana Balakrishnan
- Chief Guest: music director Santhosh Narayanan
- Judges: Nithyasree Mahadevan, S. P. Charan, Sudha Ragunathan, Mahanadhi Shobana Vignesh, Vinaya, Pushpavanam Kuppuswamy, Srilekha Parthasarathy, T. L. Maharajan, Vijay Prakash, Ramya NSK, Gana Bala, Velmurugan, Chinnaponnu, Sujatha Mohan, K.S. Chithra, Malgudi Subha, Mano, Usha Uthup, Srinivas, and Ananth Vaidyanathan
- Guest Performers: Sid Sriram, Benny Dayal, Rapper Dinesh Kanagaratnam with wildcard contestants Sowmya, Priya, and Nirujan (violin), 10-year-old Lidian Nadhaswaram (keyboard), Stephen Devassy (keyboard), and stars from previous seasons of the show.
- Chorus/vocal backing: Stars from previous seasons of the show, including notably Dhanyashree (senior season 3), Saivignesh (senior season 4), Haripriya (junior season 3 & 4), Narayanan (senior season 4), Bharath (junior season 4), Sriisha (junior season 4), Soundarya Bala Nandakumar (senior seasons 3 & 4), and others
- Competition Performances:

The grand finale was held on 18 March 2016 at DB Jain College in Thuraipakkam, Chennai. Telecast live from 7:30 pm (Indian Standard Time), the running time for the episode exceeded 5 hours, having concluded after 12:45 am on the following day, 19 March 2016. Various playback singers, performers, and music lovers attended the event.

Order	Contestant	Song	Original artist(s)	Lyricist	Music director	Movie(s) (year)
1	SS02 Fareedha	"Gnyana Pazhathai" & "Pazham Neeyappa"	K. B. Sundarambal	Kannadasan	K. V. Mahadevan	Thiruvilaiyadal (1965)
2	SS03 Rajaganapathy	"Arupadai Veedu Konda Thirumuruga"	Sirkazhi Govindarajan	Kannadasan	K. V. Mahadevan	Kandan Karunai (1967)
3	SS04 Siyad	"Raasaathi En Usir" & "Vidukathaiyam Indha Vazhkai"	Shahul Hameed	Vairamuthu	A. R. Rahman	Thiruda Thiruda (1993)
4	SS07 Lakshmi	"Yenge" & "Margazhi Thinkal"	K. S. Chitra & Srinivas; S. Janaki & P. Unnikrishnan	Vairamuthu	A. R. Rahman	Kandukondain & Sangamam (1999)
5	SS05 Anand	"Vedam Anuvilum Oru Nadam"	S. P. Balasubrahmanyam & S. P. Sailaja	Vairamuthu	Ilaiyaraaja	Salangai Oli (1983)
6	SS07 Lakshmi	"Mona Mona"	Mano, Neeti Mohan, & Tanvi Shah	Madhan Karky	A. R. Rahman	Lingaa (2014)
7	SS05 Anand	"Anbin Vaasale"	Haricharan	Madhan Karky	A. R. Rahman	Kadal (2012)
8	SS03 Rajaganapathy	"Aaluma Doluma"	Anirudh Ravichander & Badshah	Rokesh	Anirudh Ravichander	Vedalam (2015)
9	SS04 Siyad	"Vidukathaiya"	Hariharan	Vairamuthu	A. R. Rahman	Muthu (1995)
10	SS02 Fareedha	"Saregame Padhanise" ("Secret of Success")	Lucky Ali, Clinton Cerejo, Blaaze & Vasundhara Das	Vaali, Pa. Vijay & Blaaze	A. R. Rahman	Boys (2003)

==== Grand Final Results (Season 5) ====
Name	Position	Prize
SS05 Anand	Winner	Apartment worth 7 million rupees
SS02 Faridha	First Runner-up	1 million rupees cash prize
SS03 Rajaganapathy	Second Runner-up & Judge's Choice of the Day	1 million rupees cash prize
SS07 Lakshmi Pradeep	4th-placed	300,000 rupees cash prize
SS04 Siyad	5th-placed	200,000 rupees cash prize

== Controversy ==
The Hindu newspaper and other media outlets reported that the Tamil language show, its winning contestant, and its telecasting channel Star Vijay landed in controversy after the finale; "trending on social media for all the wrong reasons". Fans were enraged as details emerged that winning contestant Anand Aravindakshan already featured as a playback singer for at least ten songs in Indian films, including songs in Tamil films. Actor and filmmaker, Lakshmy Ramakrishnan wrote on Facebook that "this cannot have happened without the channel’s knowledge" and that "unethical practices have resulted in victimising not just Anand, but other participants and, of course, the audience, who spend time and money by sending SMSes to support talented youngsters." As the show has a reputation of finding budding singing talent and giving them the exposure and platform to enter the Indian film industry, social media users criticised the channel of not being upfront about the fact that a professional singer had participated as a contestant in the show and accused the channel of wrongdoing.

According to media reports, the controversy arose after a Facebook post accused TV channel Star Vijay of flouting its competition rules, and hiding the contestant's true identity from the public. Star Vijay responded to the accusations in printed media to assert that it did not hide the contestant's identity and that the current rules permitted existing playback singers to participate in the competition. Officials from the channel declared they see no need to disclose information to the public. The show's permanent judge and playback singer Srinivas also suggested it was unnecessary to rake up the past as the contestant won the most votes.

Accusations of wrongdoing were also made against the winning contestant, who refuted the allegations and expressed his dismay in a Facebook post. Viewers and social media users acknowledged that although the information was accessible on the contestant's Facebook and some other sites as refuted by the contestant, the channel probably should have explicitly stated the information to be fair, having failed to do so in at least 200 of its episodes. Social media users also noted that Star Vijay hid most of the show's episodes from audience scrutiny during the season; although almost all episodes from the season were made available for viewing-on-demand at the time of the finale, various episodes from its past seasons and spin-off seasons have been hidden from the public.
