= Super Singer (Tamil TV series) =

Indian reality television singing competition

- Genre: Music competition; Reality; Talent show
- Presented by: Chinmayi (2006-2008); Yugendran & Malini Yugendran (2009); Sivakarthikeyan & Divya (2010-2011); Makapa Anand (2011–present); Bhavana Balakrishnan (2011-2017); Priyanka Deshpande (2013–present)
- Country of origin: India
- Original language: Tamil
- No. of seasons: 12

Production
- Producer: Gautam Mrinal
- Production locations: Chennai, Tamil Nadu
- Running time: 60-70 minutes

Original release
- Network: Star Vijay
- Release: 28 April 2006 – present

Related
- Super Singer Junior

Super Singer is a 2006 Indian Tamil-language reality television singing competition, that was sponsored by KAG Tiles for the eleventh season. The show is televised in India on Star Vijay, and worldwide through partner broadcasting networks. The show, together with its spin-off editions such as Super Singer Junior, are part of Super Singer.

The program, which debuted on 28 April 2006, seeks to discover the best playback recording voice and singing talent in Tamil Nadu through a series of statewide auditions. Selected contestants are required to participate in several competition rounds, often based on a theme for a given week, and aim to be selected to perform in the show's grand finale each season.

Winners and finalists of the competition have been offered chances to sing a song in upcoming Tamil movies, and other prizes such as sums of money, gold, and real estate property. The twelfth season is all set to launch very soon.

== Series overview ==
| Season | Original broadcast | |
| Season | First aired | Last aired |
|---|---|---|
| 1 | 28 April 2006 | 12 August 2006 |
| 2 | 7 July 2008 | 3 June 2009 |
| 3 | 12 July 2010 | 23 September 2011 |
| 4 | 4 February 2013 | 1 February 2014 |
| 5 | 1 June 2015 | 18 March 2016 |
| 6 | 21 January 2018 | 15 July 2018 |
| 7 | 27 April 2019 | 10 November 2019 |
| 8 | 24 January 2021 | 26 September 2021 |
| 9 | 19 November 2022 | 25 June 2023 |
| 10 | 16 December 2023 | 23 June 2024 |
| 11 | 2 August 2025 | 1 February 2026 |
| 12 | 21 November 2026 | TBA |

== Season synopsis ==
Grand Finalists
Season 1 (2006)
| Nikhil Mathew | Winner |
| Anitha V. Karthikeyan | Runner up & Viewer's Choice |
| Sowmya Mahadevan | Jury's Choice |
Season 2 (2008-2009)
| Ajeesh | Winner |
| Ravi | Runner-up |
| Renu | 3rd Place |
| Prasanna | Eliminated in Finals |
| Ranjani | Eliminated in Finals |
Season 3 (2010-2011)
| Saicharan | Winner & Viewer's Choice |
| Santosh Hariharan | Runner-up |
| Sathya Prakash | 3rd place & Judge's Choice |
| Pooja Vaidyanath | Eliminated in Finals |
Season 4 (2013-2014)
| Diwakar | Winner & Viewer's Choice |
| Syed Subahan | First runner-up and Judge's Choice |
| Sarath Santosh | Second runner-up |
| Sonia | Third runner-up |
| Parvathy | Eliminated in Finals |
Season 5 (2015-2016)
| Anand Aravindakshan | Winner |
| Fareedha | First runner-up |
| Rajaganapathy | Second runner-up & Judges' Choice |
| Lakshmi Pradeep | Fourth place |
| Siyad | Fifth place |
Season 6 (2018)
| Senthil Ganesh | Winner |
| Rakshitha | First runner-up |
| Malavika | Second runner-up |
| Shakthi | Fourth place |
| Sreekanth | Fifth place |
| Anirudh | Sixth place |
Season 7 (2019)
| Murugan | Winner |
| Vikram | First runner-up |
| Punya | Second runner-up |
| Sam Vishal | Second runner-up |
| Gowtham | Fourth place |
Season 8 (2021)
| Sridhar Sena | Winner |
| Bharat K Rajesh | Runner Up |
| Abhilash Venkatachalam | 3rd Place |
| Muthusirpi | Fourth place |
| Anu Anand | Fifth place |
| Maanasi | Sixth place |
Season 9 (2022-2023)
| Aruna Sivaya | Winner |
| Priya Jerson | First Runner Up |
| Prasanna Adhisesha | Second Runner Up |
| Pooja Venkataraman | 3rd Runner Up |
| Abhijith Anil Kumar | 3rd Runner Up |

== History ==
=== Super Singer season 1 ===
The first season premiered on 28 April 2006, with a series of episodes which telecasted auditions for the show. Auditions were held across the state of Tamil Nadu in the cities of Coimbatore, Chennai, and Madurai. Performances by auditioning contestants were judged by singers S. P. Sailaja, Jency, Malaysia Vasudevan, Sirkazhi Sivachidambaram, Mahathi, and music director D. Imman.

The show was hosted by playback singer Chinmayi. Later stages of the competition were held at a specially designed studio set, and performances were judged by a panel of permanent judges consisting of playback singers Anuradha Sriram, P. Unnikrishnan, and Srinivas. Contestants were eliminated during the competition, and finalists received special training from voice expert Ananth Vaidyanathan in the final stages of the competition.

Season 1 title winner Nikhil Mathew was formally introduced as a playback singer after he sang the song "Enadhuyire" in the Tamil film Bheema for music director, Harris Jayaraj. Season 1 runner up and viewer's choice, Anitha V. (now known as Anitha Karthikeyan) was formally introduced as a playback singer in the Tamil film Marudhamalai by music director D. Imman.

=== Super Singer season 2 ===
The second season premiered on 7 July 2008; It held a series of episodes that telecast auditions for the show. Auditions for the show, which commenced on 27 June 2008, were held across three cities in the state of Tamil Nadu. Performances by auditioning contestants were judged by playback singers S. P. Sailaja and Srilekha Parthasarathy in the city of Coimbatore, Sunitha Sarathy and Deepan Chakravarthy in the city of Chennai, as well as Mahathi and Mathangi in the city of Trichy.

Playback singer Chinmayi returned as a permanent host of the show up to and including 21 January 2009, following which she left the show much to the disappointment of many fans of the show. She was replaced by a duo, singer-actor Yugendran and his wife, Malini, for the remainder of the show in 2009. Playback singers P. Unnikrishnan and Srinivas returned as permanent judges of the show, and a new permanent judge, playback singer Sujatha replaced Anuradha Sriram (who instead appeared as a guest judge through the season). Contestants were eliminated during the competition, and finalists received special training from voice expert Ananth Vaidyanathan in the final stages of the competition.

The Grand Finale was held on 3 June 2009 at YMCA Royapettah, Chennai. At the finals, Ajeesh won the competition and was chosen by Yuvan Shankar Raja to sing the song Idhu Varai for the soundtrack of Tamil film, Goa.

=== Super Singer season 3 ===
Airtel Super Singer 3, the third season of the Airtel Super Singer show, premiered on 12 July 2010. The third season was hosted by Divya Vijayagopal and Sivakarthikeyan. The auditions were held in various parts of Tamil Nadu, and were judged by singers including S. P. Sailaja, Nithyasree Mahadevan, Unni Menon, Sowmya, Harish Raghavendra, Pop Shalini, Mahathi, and Malgudi Subha. Sujatha, P. Unnikrishnan and Srinivas continued to be the permanent judges for the third consecutive season.

The grand finale was held on 23 September 2011 at Chennai Trade Centre and was broadcast live. Saicharan won the competition, and was chosen by A. R. Rahman and D. Imman to sing in the films Godfather, Manam Kothi Paravai, and Saattai.

=== Super Singer season 4 ===
Airtel Super Singer 4, the fourth season of the Airtel Super Singer show, premiered on 4 February 2013. The fourth season was hosted by Makapa Anand, Priyanka Deshpande, and Bhavana Balakrishnan.

The auditions were held in various parts of Tamil Nadu, and were judged by singers including S. P. Sailaja, Nithyasree Mahadevan, Unni Menon, Sowmya, Devan Ekambaram, Pop Shalini, Mahathi, Malgudi Subha and Rajinderpal Singh. Playback singers, Sujatha Mohan, Mano, P. Unnikrishnan and Srinivas, were the judges for the fourth season.

Diwakar won the competition, and was chosen by music directors D. Imman, Vivek-Mervin, and Kannan to sing in the films Panjumittai, Vadacurry, and Kalkandu.

=== Super Singer season 5 ===
Airtel Super Singer 5, the fifth season of the Airtel Super Singer show, premiered on 1 June 2015. The fifth season was hosted by Makapa Anand, Priyanka Deshpande, and Bhavana Balakrishnan.

The auditions were held in various parts of Tamil Nadu and were telecast until 3 July 2015. First-round audition judges included season 3 winner Saisharan, season 4 winner Diwakar, and former contestants from those seasons such as D. Sathyaprakash, Pooja Vaidyanath, Santhosh Hariharan, and Sonia. Second and third round audition judges included S. P. Charan, Pushpavanam Kuppusamy, Devan Ekambaram, James Vasanthan, Mahathi, S. Sowmya, and Pop Shalini. Zonal audition judges were permanent judges from the junior version of the show, Malgudi Subha, Mano, and K. S. Chithra. A total of 33 contestants were selected for the finals, including local, international, and former contestants.

Playback singers, P. Unnikrishnan, Srinivas, Mano, and Usha Uthup, were the judges for the fifth season. At the finale of the show, contestant Anand Aravindakshan was declared the winner of the season, while contestant Fareedha was declared first runner-up. Both finalists were promised an opportunity to sing for one of the upcoming films of music director Santhosh Narayanan. Contestant Rajaganapathy was chosen as the judge's choice scoring the highest marks and being declared the second runner-up of the season.

The season landed in controversy as social media users accused the STAR Vijay Indian TV channel of wrongdoing. Social media users expressed concern that audiences who spent time and money to support talented youngsters were the victim of unethical practices and criticised the channel for not being upfront about the fact that the winning contestant was already a professional playback singer - which was defended by the channel.

=== Super Singer season 6 ===
Nippon Paint Super Singer 6 was hosted by Makapa Anand and Priyanka Deshpande, which ran from 21 January 2018 to 15 July 2018 and was broadcast by Star Vijay.

All the episodes of Super Singer 6 are available on the OTT platform Hotstar.

The judging panel includes, Anuradha Sriram, P. Unnikrishnan, Benny Dayal, and Shweta Mohan. A.R. Rahman was the Ambassador for this season. The top 6 finalists were Rakshitha, Sreekanth, Sakthi, Anirudh, Malavika, and Senthil Ganesh. The results of the finale are given as:

- Senthil Ganesh was declared the Winner of the Super Singer 6
- Rakshitha Suresh became the first runner up of the season and gets applauded by everyone for being the "Golden Voice of the Season".
- Malavika Rajesh Vaidya was the second runner up of the season.
- Suswaram Anirudh, Sakthi Amaran, Sreekanth Hariharan were the other finalists

=== Super Singer season 7 ===
Asian Paints Super Singer 7 started on 27 April 2019 and finished on 10 November 2019 on Star Vijay and was telecast from 8 PM onwards. Makapa Anand and Priyanka Deshpande return as the hosts for this season.

This season returns with the same judges' panel including, Anuradha Sriram, Unnikrishnan, Shweta Mohan, and Benny Dayal. Anirudh Ravichandran is the Ambassador for this season. The top 5 were Mookuthi Murugan (SS3), Sam Vishal (SS7), Vikram (SS13), Gowtham, and Punya(SS 6).

Winners:

- Murugan was declared the Winner of the Super Singer Season 7 and received a 50 lakh worth house by Arun Excello.
- Vikram was the first runner up of the season and was awarded 25 lakh gold by Gold one.
- Sam Vishal and Punya were tied as the second runner up of the season.
- Gowtham was the third runner up of the season.

All of the episodes of this season are available on the OTT Platform-Hotstar.

=== Super Singer season 8 ===
Asian Paints Super Singer 8 premiered on 24 January 2021 with a Grand Launch of a nine-hour program on Star Vijay with grace performances of Hariharan, Shankar Mahadevan, Anuradha Sriram, P. Unnikrishnan, Sid Sriram, Sakthisree Gopalan, Saindhavi, Vijay Prakash, Karthik, Anthony Daasan Shashaa Tirupati, Benny Dayal, Kalpana Raghavendar, Pradeep, Vijay Yesudas, S. P. Charan, Gana Bala, Chinnaponnu, Karunas. All the episodes will be available on the OTT Platform-Hotstar.

The judging panel was often shuffled with Anuradha Sriram, P. Unnikrishnan, Benny Dayal, Shweta Mohan, S. P. Charan, Shakthisree Gopalan and Kalpana Raghavendar. Once again, the eighth season was hosted by Makapa Anand and Priyanka Deshpande.

The Grand Finale aired on 26 September 2021. At the finals, Sridhar Sena won the title.

Prize Winners:

- Sridhar Sena was announced the Winner of the Super Singer 8 and received a 10 lakh award by Vijay TV. He has also been provided the opportunity to sing in a future film song composed by Anirudh Ravichander.
- Bharat K Rajesh (announced by Mervin Solomon) was the runner up of the season and was awarded an amount of 3 lakhs and an additional amount of Rs 50,000.
- Abhilash Venkatachalam was announced third place by Santhosh Narayanan. He received a cash prize of Rs 2 lakh, and stated that the money was going to be spent for those who were affected by the COVID - 19 Pandemic situation.
- Muthusirpi was awarded the title of Differentiator of the Season and received an amount of Rs 1 lakh, presented by K. S. Chithra.

==== Season 8 contestants ====
| Season 8 contestants | Notes |
|---|---|
| Sridhar Sena | Winner |
| Bharat K Rajesh | 1st runner up |
| Abhilash Venkatachalam | 2nd runner up |
| Muthusirpi | 3rd runner up |
| Anu Anand | 4th Runner Up |
| Maanasi G kannan | 5th Runner Up |
| Adithya RK | Eliminated |
| Iyenar KJ | Eliminated |
| Aravind karneeswaran | Eliminated |
| Gaana sudhakar | Eliminated |
| Vrusha bala | Eliminated |
| Balaji Sri | Eliminated |
| Vanathi Suresh | Eliminated |
| Kumuthini Pandian | Eliminated |
| Kabhini mithra | Eliminated |
| Puratchi Mani | Eliminated |
| Reshma Shyam | Eliminated |
| Kanimozhi Kabilan | Eliminated |
| Jacqueline Mary | Eliminated |
| Sushmita Narasimhan | Eliminated |

=== Super Singer season 9 ===
MRF Vapocure Paints Super Singer Season 9 started on 19 November 2022 on Star Vijay and was telecast from every Saturday and Sunday at 6:30 PM. Makapa Anand and Priyanka Deshpande returns as the hosts for this season. This season returns with the same judges' panel including, Anuradha Sriram, P. Unnikrishnan, Benny Dayal, and Shweta Mohan.

Super Singer Season 9 Grand Finale was held on 25 June 2023 at Jawaharlal Nehru Indoor Stadium, Chennai.

During the contestants' tenure at Super Singer 9, several finalists were offered to sing in film albums. The offer was made by music artists, such as Sam C. S. and Hiphop Tamizha Adhi. Pooja Venkatraman was first offered to sing a song under Sam C. S's direction. Subsequently, Abhijith Anilkumar was offered to co-sing a song with Shreya Ghoshal in the film Thiruvin Kural, with the lyrics being written by the songwriter Vairamuthu. Finally, Aruna Sivaya was offered to sing a song under the music direction of Hiphop Tamizha Adhi .

The five finalists of Super Singer 9 are Abhijith Anilkumar, Aruna Sivaya, Pooja Venkatraman, Priya Jerson and Prasanna Adhisesha. Prassana Adhisesha was nominated from the wildcard round.

Several guests that included in the grand finale are Harris Jayaraj, Kalpana Raghavendar, Ananth Vaidyanathan, Pushpavanam Kuppusamy, Binni Krishnakumar.

The grand finale consisted of two rounds. The first round and the second round enabled the contestants to choose their own songs and sing them in front of the wide audience. Several contestants merged two songs, during the second round.

Prize Winners:

- Aruna Sivaya, who was announced by Harris Jayaraj, won Super Singer 9. So she was gifted with an apartment worth 60 Rs lakhs and received a Rs 10 lakhs cash prize award by Star Vijay.
- Priya Jerson was announced by Harris Jayaraj, as the first runner-up of Super Singer 9 and was awarded a Rs 10 lakhs cash prize award by Star Vijay.
- Prasanna Adhisesha was announced as the second runner-up of Super Singer 9 and was awarded a Rs 5 lakhs cash prize award by Star Vijay.

| Name of the Singer | Title/Prize | Name of Song (Round 1) | Name of Film/Album | Singer(s) | Composer(s) | Name of Song (Round 2) | Name of Film/Album | Singer(s) | Composer(s) |
|---|---|---|---|---|---|---|---|---|---|
| Aruna Sivaya | Title Winner - Rs 60 Lakhs Flat, Rs 10 Lakhs cash prize | Ventriduven Unnai | Agathiyar | T. M. Soundararajan, Sirkazhi Govindarajan | Kunnakudi Vaidyanathan | Sambrani Vaasagare | Kirrtesh Entertainment | V.M. Mahalingam, Muthu Sirpi | Hendry |
| Priya Jerson | First Runner Up - Rs 10 Lakhs cash prize | Mayya Mayya(song) | Guru | Chinmayi, Maryem Tollar, Keerthi Sagathia | A. R. Rahman | Oh Mama Mama | Minnale | Shankar Mahadevan, Tippu (singer) | Harris Jayaraj |
| Prasanna Adhisesha | Second Runner Up - Rs 5 Lakhs cash prize | Vikram Vikram | Vikram (1986 Tamil film) | Kamal Haasan, S. Janaki | Ilaiyaraaja | Oru Paarvai Paar | 12B | Karthik (singer) | Harris Jayaraj |
| Abhijith Anilkumar | Professional Title Winner | Arjunaru Villu | Ghilli | Sukhwinder Singh, Manikka Vinayagam | Vidyasagar (composer) | Thom Karuvil Irundom | Star (2001 film) | Shankar Mahadevan | A. R. Rahman |
| Pooja Venkatraman | Professional First Runner up | Kanaa Kaangiren | Ananda Thandavam | Nithyasree Mahadevan, Shubha Mudgal | G. V. Prakash Kumar | Rahathulla | Ghajini (2005 film) | Annupamaa | Harris Jayaraj |

=== Super Singer season 10 ===
Super Singer Season 10, the tenth season of the Airtel Super Singer show, premiered on Star Vijay on 16 December 2023, and telecasts every Saturday and Sunday. KAG Tiles is the sponsor for this season. Once again, this season is hosted by Makapa Anand and Priyanka Deshpande. The judging panel of this season is, Anuradha Sriram, Sean Roldan, Mano, and Sujatha Mohan.

The Grand Finale was on 23 June 2024. At the finals, John Jerome was the title winner. Jeevitha became the first runner-up, and Vaishanvi became the second runner-up.

Prize Winners:

| Name of the Singer | Title/Prize | Name of Song (Round 1) | Name of Film/Album | Singer(s) | Composer(s) | Name of Song (Round 2) | Name of Film/Album | Singer(s) | Composer(s) |
|---|---|---|---|---|---|---|---|---|---|
| John Jerome | Title Winner - Rs 60 Lakhs Apartment | | | | | | | | |
| Jeevitha | First Runner Up | | | | | | | | |
| Vaishnavi | Second Runner Up | | | | | | | | |

- John Jerome; won Super Singer 10. So he was gifted with an apartment worth 60 Rs lakhs.
- Jeevitha; first runner-up Singer 10
- Vaishnavi; second runner-up of Super Singer 10.

==== Celebrity Guests ====
Season 10 saw several celebrity guests praising the contestants for their performances and also performing along with the contestants, who include:

| Name of Guest | Episode Number(s) |
|---|---|
| Velmurugan | 9 |
| Malathy Lakshman | 9 |
| Pragathi Guruprasad | 10, 11 |
| Sundarayyar | 10, 11 |
| Grace Karunas | 10, 11 |
| Radha (actress) | 12, 13 |
| R. K. Selvamani | 12, 13 |
| R. Aravindraj | 12, 13 |
| Sivaangi Krishnakumar | 14, 15 |
| T. L. Maharajan | 16, 17 |
| Vinusha Devi | 16, 17 |
| Jayam Ravi | 18, 19 |
| K. Manikandan | 18, 19 |
| Rakshita Suresh | 18, 19 |
| Ajesh | 18, 19 |
| Srinisha Jayaseelan | 18, 19 |
| Sam Vishal | 18, 19 |
| K. S. Ravikumar | 20, 21 |
| Dheena (actor) | 20, 21 |
| Pavani Reddy | 20, 21 |
| Mahendran (actor) | 20, 21 |
| Unni Menon | 22, 23 |
| Malgudi Subha | 22, 23 |
| Kalpana Raghavendar | 22, 23 |
| Deva (composer) | 46, 47 |
| Srikanth Deva | 47 |
| Sabesh–Murali | 47 |
| Mohan (actor) | 48, 49 |

=== Super Singer Season 11 ===
Super Singer Season 11, the eleventh season of the Airtel Super Singer show, premiered on Star Vijay on 2nd August 2025, telecasting every Saturday and Sunday. KAG Tiles is once again the sponsor for this season. Once again, the eleventh season will be hosted by the dynamic duo Makapa Anand and Priyanka Deshpande. The judging panel includes composer Thaman S, filmmaker Mysskin, and popular playback singers Anuradha Sriram, and P. Unnikrishnan.

The first promo was released on 14th July 2025.

The 7 Finalists were 1.Nikhil 2.Dishathana 3.Saran Raja 4.Meenakshi 5.Thavaseeli 6.Dharshana 7.Abraham

The Title winner of Season 11 was Nikhil , The First Runner Up was both Saran Raja and Dishathana The Second Runner Up was Meenakshi

This was the first season to have 7 finalists

=== Super Singer Season 12 ===
Super Singer Season 12, the twelfth season of the Airtel Super Singer show, premiered on Star Vijay on 21st November 2026, telecasting every Saturday and Sunday. For the third time in a row, KAG Tiles is the sponsor for this season. This time, the twelfth season will be hosted by none other than the dynamic duo Makapa Anand and actress Shruthika.

The judging panel consists of 14 judges (7 male and 7 female judges that are composed of former contestants, finalists, and title winners from previous seasons). The 7 male judges are: Sathyaprakash, Nivas, Diwakar, Pravin Saivi, R.K. Adithya, Senthil, and Santosh Hariharan. The 7 female judges are: Punya Selva, Priyanka NK, Rakshitha, Nithya Sri, Roshini, Rajalakshmi, and Sivaangi Krishnakumar.

The first "Audition Call For" promo was released on 27th July 2026. The first launch promo was released on 8th November 2026, unveiling the release date.

== Spin-off ==
=== Super Singer T20 ===
Super Singer T20 (சூப்பர் சிங்கர் T20) is a 2012-2015 Indian Tamil-language reality television singing competition, which aired on Star Vijay. Former contestants from previous seasons of the Super Singer and Airtel Super Singer Junior shows were divided into 6 teams. 15 league matches were held where each team competed against the other five teams. 4 teams were selected for the knockout semi-finals, before the remaining 2 teams competed against each other in the finals. The show was hosted by Divyadarshini.

=== Super Singer - Champion of Champions ===
Super Singer - Champion of Champions is a 2020 Indian Tamil-language reality television singing competition, which aired on Star Vijay.

Shankar Mahadevan, Sudha Ragunathan, K. S. Chithra, Chinmayi, Anuradha Sriram, Benny Dayal, Kalpana Raghavendar, Vijay Yesudas, Shweta Mohan and Sikkil Gurucharan as the judges, take turns to watch their performance live, albeit, from their homes. The show was hosted by Ma Ka Pa Anand and Priyanka Deshpande. Super Singer Champion Of Champions Winner is Hari Priya.

=== Bakthi Super Singer ===
Bakthi Super Singer (பக்தி சூப்பர் சிங்கர்) is a 2025 Indian Tamil-language reality television devotional singing competition show, which aired on Star Vijay. The show is part of Super Singer and focus exclusively on Tamil devotional songs, bringing spiritual music to television screens across Tamil Nadu. Anuradha Sriram and Akshatha Das were hosts of the show which was judged by Mahathi, T. L. Maharajan and Pushpavanam Kuppusamy are the judges of the show. The show has 12 singers. The show was aired from 31 May to 27 July 2025 and ended with 18 Episodes.

The Grand Finale was held on 26th and 27th July 2025 on Saturday and Sunday. The show was won by Shravan Narayan, while Alaina Sajith emerged as the first runner up of the show.

== Adaptations ==
| Language | Title | Original release | Network(s) | Last aired | Notes |
|---|---|---|---|---|---|
| Telugu | Super Singer సూపర్ సింగర్ | 9 September 2015 | Star Maa | 28 August 2022 | Remake |
| Bengali | Super Singer সুপার সিঙ্গার | 1 June 2019 | Star Jalsha | 21 May 2023 | Remake |

== See also ==
- Super Singer Junior
- Super Singer T20
