= Rakshita Suresh =

Indian playback singer (born 1998)

- Occupations: Singer; stage performer
- Years active: 2015–present
- Works: Discography; television
- Awards: Full list
- Musical career
- Genres: Carnatic classical; Hindustani classical; filmi; rock; pop; folk; light; EDM
- Instrument: Vocals
- Labels: Sony Music India; T-Series; Think Music; Zee Music Company; Saregama; Tips Industries; Jhankar Music; Lahari Music; Anand Audio

Rakshita Suresh is an Indian playback singer and stage performer who works primarily in the South Indian film industries. She has performed internationally and is one of the lead singers in A. R. Rahman's band. She has recorded songs in Tamil, Telugu, Kannada, Malayalam, and Hindi.

She has received several industry awards, including the Vijay Television Award for Favourite Singer (2023). She has also been nominated for the SIIMA Awards three times, the IIFA Award once, and the Mirchi Music Award for Upcoming Female Vocalist of the Year once.

Her playback work includes songs from films such as Jawan, Ponniyin Selvan: I and II, Thug Life, Amaran, and The Goat Life. Her independent releases include "Kutty Pattas," "Moopilla Thamizhe Thaaye," "Vilagathey," and "That’s How We Roll – 1 Min Music."

== Early life ==
She has received training in Carnatic classical music, Hindustani classical music, and light music.

== Career ==
Rakshita made her debut as a playback singer in 2015 with the song "Challa Gaali" for the Telugu film Yevade Subramanyam, composed by Ilaiyaraaja. She made her Hindi film debut with the song "Yaane Yaane" for the soundtrack of the 2021 film Mimi, composed by A. R. Rahman. She has since recorded songs in several Indian film industries across multiple languages. Some of her notable playback recordings include "Sol" from Ponniyin Selvan: I, "Kirunage" from Ponniyin Selvan: II, "Vennilavu Saaral" from Amaran, "Kaalathukkum Nee Venum" from Vendhu Thanindhathu Kaadu, "Nanage Neenu" from Upadhyaksha, "Sanchariyaagu Nee" from Love Mocktail 2, "Kodi Parakura Kaalam" from Maamannan, and "Engeyo" from Thug Life.

Rakshita began her public singing career through participation in televised music competitions from an early age. She appeared on the Kannada music show Yede Thumbi Haduvenu on ETV Kannada, and later competed on Super Singer Junior 3 on Star Vijay, Sa Re Ga Ma Pa Hindi on Zee TV, and Rising Star Season 1 on Colors TV. She won the Kannada reality show Rhythm Tadheem and was the title winner on Little Star Singer on Asianet Suvarna. In 2018, she was the first runner-up on Super Singer 6 on Star Vijay.

== Television ==
Year	Show	Role	Network	Language	Notes
2009	Little Star Singer	Contestant	Asianet Suvarna	Kannada	
2011–2012	Super Singer Junior 3	Contestant	Star Vijay	Tamil	
2016	Sa Re Ga Ma Pa	Contestant	Zee TV	Hindi	
2017	Rising Star Season 1	Contestant	Colors TV	Hindi	
2018	Super Singer 6	Contestant	Star Vijay	Tamil	First runner-up
2024	Super Singer 10	Guest Performer	Star Vijay	Tamil	
2025	Super Singer 11	Judge	Star Vijay	Tamil	

== Discography ==
	Song	Movie	Language	Composer	Co-artists	Notes	Ref.
2015	"Challa Gaali"	Yevade Subramanyam	Telugu	Ilaiyaraaja	Christian Jose, Sethil		
2018	"Kannane Kanne"	God Father	Telugu	Naviin Ravindran	Aalap Raju, Lokesh		
2018	"Ninna Kannolagilidu"	Aa Nayana	Kannada	Sunita Chandrakumar	Sahajeet Chandrakumar		
2018	"Talakke Tallavidu"	Aa Nayana	Kannada	Sunita Chandrakumar			
2018	"Lokada Kannige"	Aa Nayana	Kannada	Sunita Chandrakumar	Shreya. K. Bhat		
2018	"Bhaama Ramana Deepamerage"	Deepa Lakshmi	Kannada		Shreya. K. Bhat		
2018	"Aare Ivanaare Mohana"	Deepa Lakshmi	Kannada		Vasundha Shastri, Sinchana C		
2019	"Pattamarangal"	Vantha Rajavathaan Varuven	Tamil	Hiphop Tamizha	Sanjith Hegde, Srinithi S		
2019	"Vilagathey"	The Final Chapter of Usuraiya Tholaichaen	Tamil	Stephen Zechariah	Stephen Zechariah		
2019	"Party Song"	Gangs of 18	Telugu	A H Kaashif			
2019	"Maruppu"	Gangs of 18	Telugu	A H Kaashif			
2019	"Varamai Vandha Vaazhvu"	Appa Oru Varam	Tamil	Raja Shah			
2019	"Yennai Yeno"	Appa Oru Varam	Tamil	Raja Shah			
2020	"Oththa Kannula	Thanne Vandi	Tamil	Moses	Ananthu		
2021	"Kutty Pattas"	Album Song	Tamil	Santhosh Dhayanidhi	Santhosh Dhayanidhi		
2021	"Rowdy Pattas"	Album Song	Telugu	Santhosh Dhayanidhi	Santhosh Dhayanidhi		
2021	"Yaane Yaane"	Mimi	Hindi	A. R. Rahman		Nominated for Mirchi Music awards for the category " Upcoming female vocalist of the year "	
2021	"Mutyala Chemma Chekka Remix"	Love Story	Telugu	Pawan CH			
2021	"Allipoola Vennela"	Telangana Bathukkama Jagrunthi	Telugu	A. R. Rahman	Haripriya, Deepthi Suresh, Aparna Harikumar, Padmaja, Uthara Unnikrishnan		
2021	"Beatta Yaethi"	Album Song	Tamil	Arish			
2021	"Nee Parichaya"	Ninna Sanihake	Kannada	Raghu Dixit	Sidhdhartha Belamannu	Nominated for SIIMA Awards for the category "Best Female Singer" - Kannada for the year 2021	
2021	"Sahana Swaravu"	Sivaji: The Boss	Kannada	A. R. Rahman		Kannada dubbed version of Sivaji	
2021	"Aruvi (Title Track)"	Aruvi TV Series (Sun TV)	Tamil	Shravan Sridhar			
2022	"Sanchariyagu Nee"	Love Mocktail 2	Kannada	Nakul Abhyankar	Vijay Prakash		
2022	"O Nidhima"	Love Mocktail 2	Kannada	Nakul Abhyankar			
2022	"Moopilla Thamizhe Thaaye"	Tamil Anthem	Tamil	A. R. Rahman	A. R. Rahman, Saindhavi, Nakul Abhyankar, A. R. Ameen, Amina, Rafiq, Gabriella Sellus, Niranjana Ramanan, Aparna Harikumar		
2022	"Kan Kan Mein Shriram"	Devotional song	Hindi	Aditya Ramkumar	Sarthak Kalyani		
2022	"Aasai Alai Meerudhae"	Album song	Tamil	Bharath Raghavan			
2022	"Karupazhagi"	Album song	Tamil	Satthia Nallaiah	Satthia Nallaiah		
2022	"Tholi Tholi"	The Legend	Telugu	Harris Jayaraj	Haricharan		
2022	"Kaalathukkam Nee Venum"	Vendhu Thanindhathu Kaadu	Tamil	A. R. Rahman	Silambarasan		
2022	"Ninne Thaladanne"	The Life of Muthu	Telugu	A. R. Rahman	Sam Vishal		
2022	"'Yele Ilanchingamey"	Cobra	Tamil	A. R. Rahman			
2022	"Sol"	Ponniyin Selvan: I	Tamil	A. R. Rahman			
2022	"Ayyo Plastic"	Album song	Kannada	Sunita Chandrakumar			
2022	"Vaadi Valarpiraye"	Azhagiya Kanne	Tamil	N.R.Ragunanthan	Sayyad Suban, Savni Raveendra		
2022	"Ezhuthum Neeye"	Naatpadu Theral:2	Tamil	Vidyasagar	K.Krishnakumar		
2022	"Tholi Tholi"	The Legend	Telugu	Harris Jayaraj	Haricharan		
2022	"Thats How We Roll"	Album Song	Tamil			Part of Instagram 1 minute music series	
2022	"Pani Puri"	Album Song	Tamil		Sathya Prakash	Part of Instagram 1 minute music series	
2023	"Kirunage"	Ponniyin Selvan: II	Kannada	A. R. Rahman		Kannada Dubbed Version of PS-2	
2023	"Veera Raja Veera"	Ponniyin Selvan: II	Kannada	A. R. Rahman	Vijay Prakash, Sivasri Skandaprasad	Kannada Dubbed Version of PS-2	
2023	"Kanjaadai Poova"	Vallaan	Tamil	Santhosh Dhayanidhi	Karthik		
2023	"Kodi Parakura Kaalam"	Maamannan	Tamil	A. R. Rahman	Kalpana Raghavendar, Deepthi Suresh, Aparna Harikumar		
2023	"Theeraa Vaanam"	Sweet Kaaram Coffee	Tamil	Govind Vasantha			
2023	”Not Ramaiya Vastavaiya”	Jawan	Tamil, Telugu	Anirudh Ravichander	Anirudh Ravichander, Sreerama Chandra		
2023	"Nanage Neenu"	Upadhyaksha	Kannada	Arjun Janya	Vijay Prakash		
2023	"Main Parwaana"	Pippa	Hindi	A. R. Rahman	Arijit Singh, Pooja Tiwari, Nisa Shetty		
2023	"Yaava Janumada Gelati"	Kaatera	Kannada	Hari Krishna	Hemanth Kumar		
2024	"Omane"	The Goat Life - Aadujeevitham	Malayalam, Tamil, Telugu, Kannada, Hindi	A. R. Rahman	Chinmayi, Vijay Yesudas		
2024	"Vennilavu Saaral"	Amaran	Tamil	G. V. Prakash Kumar	Kapil Kapilan		
2024	"Mounam Pole (Female Version)"	Vanangaan	Tamil	G. V. Prakash Kumar	Karthik Netha		
2024	"Sri Krishnam"	Krishnam Pranaya Sakhi	Kannada	Arjun Janya			
2024	"Ringu Chaku"	Hitler	Tamil	Vivek–Mervin	Vivek Siva		
2025	"Engeyo"	Thug Life	Tamil	A. R. Rahman			
2025	"Yaaru Petha"	Desingu Raja 2	Tamil	Vidyasagar	Harshavardhan		
2025	"Kanaga"	Non Violence	Tamil	Yuvan Shankar Raja	Vozhi, Super Subu		
2026	"Alangaari"	Jockey	Tamil	Sakthi Balaji	Sathya Prakash		
2026	"Hellallallo"	Peddi	Telugu	A. R. Rahman			
	“Sita’s Aspiration”	Ramayana	Hindi,Tamil,Telugu,Kannada, Malayalam	A. R. Rahman	A. R. Ameen, Vaishali Samant, Antara Nandy		
	“Jai Jai Ram” (Kannada)	Ramayana	Kannada	A. R. Rahman	Raghav Kaushik		

== Awards ==
Year	Award	Category	Work	Language	Result	Ref.
2022	Mirchi Music Awards	Upcoming Female Vocalist of the Year	Yaane Yaane	Hindi	Nominated
2022	SIIMA	Best Female Playback Singer	Nee Parichaya	Kannada	Nominated
2023	Vijay Television Awards	Favorite Singer		Tamil	Won
2023	SIIMA	Best Female Playback Singer	Sol	Tamil	Nominated
2025	SIIMA	Best Female Playback Singer	Vennilavu Saaral	Tamil	Nominated
