= Super Singer 9 =

- Season 9
- Super Singer 9 finalists

Release
- Original network: Star Vijay
- Original release: 19 November 2022 – 25 June 2023
- Presented by: Makapa Anand; Priyanka Deshpande
- Judges: Anuradha Sriram; P. Unnikrishnan; Benny Dayal; Shweta Mohan
- Winner: Aruna Sivaya
- Runner-up: Priya Jerson

Season chronology
- ← Previous; Super Singer 8 Next → Super Singer 10

Super Singer Season 9 is a 2022–2023 Indian Tamil-language reality television singing competition show. The ninth season of Super Singer, which airs on Star Vijay and streams on Disney+ Hotstar, telecasts every Saturday and Sunday at 6:30 pm, which started from 19 November 2022. MRF Vapocure Paints is the main sponsor for this season.

Makapa Anand and Priyanka Deshpande return as hosts once again for this season. The judging panel consists of four popular playback singers, Anuradha Sriram, P. Unnikrishnan, Benny Dayal, and Shweta Mohan.

The Grand Finale was held on 25 June 2023. At the finals, Aruna Sivaya was the title winner. Aruna is the first woman to become the title winner of Super Singer.Priya Jerson emerged as the Runner up of the season and Prasana as 2nd Runner up.

== Judges ==
Judges	Notes
Benny Dayal	Indian playback singer. He has sung more than 3500 songs in 19+ Indian languages.
Anuradha Sriram	Indian carnatic and playback singer and child actress who hails from the Indian state of Tamil Nadu. She has sung more than 700 songs in Tamil, Telugu, Sinhala, Malayalam, Kannada, Bengali and Hindi films.
Shweta Mohan	Indian playback singer. She has recorded more than 700 songs and albums in all the four south Indian languages namely Malayalam, Tamil, Telugu, Kannada, she has also recorded songs for Hindi films and has established herself as a leading playback singer of South Indian cinema.
P. Unnikrishnan	Indian Carnatic vocalist and playback singer.

== Hosts ==
Host	Notes
Makapa Anand	Indian television presenter, host and actor. He predominantly works in Tamil television and film industry.
Priyanka Deshpande	Indian television presenter, host and actress. She predominantly works in Tamil television and film industry.

== Episodes ==
Air Date(s)	Round Name	Super 3/5 Zone	Special Guest(s) & Judge(s)
3 December 2022	Top 5 Zone Selection Round	Abhijith Anil Kumar (BP); Pooja Venkatraman; Priya Jerson; Keshav Ram Aruna Sivaya; Dinesh (BE)	
4 December 2022	Top 5 Zone Selection Round	Abhijith Anil Kumar (BP); Pooja Venkatraman; Priya Jerson; Keshav Ram Aruna Sivaya; Dinesh (BE)	
10 December 2022	Top 5 Zone Selection Round	Abhijith Anil Kumar (BP); Pooja Venkatraman; Priya Jerson; Keshav Ram Aruna Sivaya; Dinesh (BE)	
11 December 2022	Top 5 Zone Selection Round	Abhijith Anil Kumar (BP); Pooja Venkatraman; Priya Jerson; Keshav Ram Aruna Sivaya; Dinesh (BE)	
17 December 2022	Time Travel Round	Aparna Narayanan (BP); Dinesh; Karthik (BE); Anantha Gopan; Prasanna Adhisesha	
18 December 2022	Time Travel Round	Aparna Narayanan (BP); Dinesh; Karthik (BE); Anantha Gopan; Prasanna Adhisesha	
24 December 2022	Thara Local Round	Abhijith Anil Kumar (BP); Aruna Sivaya; Sashank (BE); Pooja Venkatraman; Yazhini	
25 December 2022	Thara Local Round	Abhijith Anil Kumar (BP); Aruna Sivaya; Sashank (BE); Pooja Venkatraman; Yazhini	
31 December 2022	Hits of 2022	Anantha Gopan (BP); Priya Jerson; Keshav Ram; Karthik; Chanderan Chan (BE)	K. S. Chithra
1 January 2023	Hits of 2022	Anantha Gopan (BP); Priya Jerson; Keshav Ram; Karthik; Chanderan Chan (BE)	K. S. Chithra
7 January 2023	Devotional Round	Aruna Sivaya (BP); Sneha Padmanabhan (BE); Abhijith Anilkumar; Pooja Venkatraman; Prasanna Adhisesha	
8 January 2023	Devotional Round	Aruna Sivaya (BP); Sneha Padmanabhan (BE); Abhijith Anilkumar; Pooja Venkatraman; Prasanna Adhisesha	
14 January 2023	Pongal Celebration Round	Karthik (BP); Prasanna Adhisesha (BE)	
21 January 2023	Wild Card Round	Hari Vignesh; Ancy Mary	
28 January 2023	Evergreen 90s Round	Yazhini (BP); Anantha Gopan; Karthik; Aparna Narayanan (BE); Sashank	Khushbu
29 January 2023	Evergreen 90s Round	Yazhini (BP); Anantha Gopan; Karthik; Aparna Narayanan (BE); Sashank	Meena (actress)
4 February 2023	Romance Round	Abhijith Anilkumar (BE); Pooja Venkatraman (BP); Aruna Sivaya; Aparna Narayanan; Karthik	RJ Balaji Sam C. S.
5 February 2023	Romance Round	Abhijith Anilkumar (BE); Pooja Venkatraman (BP); Aruna Sivaya; Aparna Narayanan; Karthik	RJ Balaji Sam C. S.
11 February 2023	SPB Special Round	Shashank (BP); Pooja Venkatraman (BE); Hari Vignesh; Priya Jerson; Aruna Sivaya	S. P. Charan S. P. Sailaja S. P. Pallavi
12 February 2023	SPB Special Round	Shashank (BP); Pooja Venkatraman (BE); Hari Vignesh; Priya Jerson; Aruna Sivaya	S. P. Charan S. P. Sailaja S. P. Pallavi
18 February 2023	Deva Ragam Special Round	Abhijith Anilkumar (BP); Pooja Venkatraman; Aruna Sivaya; Priya Jerson (BE); Karthik	Deva (composer)
19 February 2023	Deva Ragam Special Round	Abhijith Anilkumar (BP); Pooja Venkatraman; Aruna Sivaya; Priya Jerson (BE); Karthik	Deva (composer)
25 February 2023	Strong Music Genre Challenge Round	Prasanna Adhisesha (BP); Abhijith Anilkumar; Karthik; Chanderan Chan (BE)	Varalaxmi Sarathkumar; Santhosh Prathap
26 February 2023	Strong Music Genre Challenge Round	Prasanna Adhisesha (BP); Abhijith Anilkumar; Karthik; Chanderan Chan (BE)	Varalaxmi Sarathkumar; Santhosh Prathap
4 March 2023	Folk Songs Round	Pooja Venkatraman (BP); Aruna Sivaya (BE); Prasanna Adhisesha	Senthil Ganesh; Pushpavanam Kuppusamy; Kidakkuzhi Mariyammal; V M Mahalingam; Rajalakshmi Senthil
5 March 2023	Folk Songs Round	Pooja Venkatraman (BP); Aruna Sivaya (BE); Prasanna Adhisesha	Senthil Ganesh; Pushpavanam Kuppusamy; Kidakkuzhi Mariyammal; V M Mahalingam; Rajalakshmi Senthil
11 March 2023	Top 10 Celebration	Abhijith Anilkumar (BP); Karthik (BE)	Haricharan; Santhosh Narayanan; Vijay Yesudas; Shakthisree Gopalan; Sam C. S. Sathyaprakash Dharmar
12 March 2023	Top 10 Celebration	Abhijith Anilkumar (BP); Karthik (BE)	Haricharan; Santhosh Narayanan; Vijay Yesudas; Shakthisree Gopalan; Sam C. S. Sathyaprakash Dharmar
18 March 2023	Classic Hits Round	Abhijith Anilkumar (BP); Pooja Venkatraman; Prasanna Adhisesha (BE)	Sujatha Mohan; Vijay Yesudas
19 March 2023	Classic Hits Round	Abhijith Anilkumar (BP); Pooja Venkatraman; Prasanna Adhisesha (BE)	Sujatha Mohan; Vijay Yesudas
25 March 2023	Anbudan Naan Round	Abhijith Anilkumar (BP); Pooja Venkatraman; Priya Jerson (BE)	
26 March 2023	Anbudan Naan Round	Abhijith Anilkumar (BP); Pooja Venkatraman; Priya Jerson (BE)	
1 April 2023	80s Remix Round	Karthik (BP); Abhijith Anilkumar; Priya Jerson (BE)	Vijay; Iykki Berry; KJ Iyenar; ADK
2 April 2023	80s Remix Round	Karthik (BP); Abhijith Anilkumar; Priya Jerson (BE)	Vijay; Iykki Berry; KJ Iyenar; ADK
8 April 2023	STR Hits Round	Abhijith Anilkumar (BP); Prasanna Adhisesha; Pooja Venkatraman; Priya Jerson (BE)	T. Rajendar
9 April 2023	STR Hits Round	Abhijith Anilkumar (BP); Prasanna Adhisesha; Pooja Venkatraman; Priya Jerson (BE)	K. Bhagyaraj; T. Rajendar
15 April 2023	Doubles Round	Pooja Venkatraman (BP); Aruna Sivaya (BP); Priya Jerson (BE)	
16 April 2023	Doubles Round	Pooja Venkatraman (BP); Aruna Sivaya (BP); Priya Jerson (BE)	
22 April 2023	Performance with Vijay Stars	Dinesh Kumar (BP); Karthik (BE)	Vinusha Devi; Raveena Daha; VJ Vishal; Myna Nandhini; VJ Deepika Lakshmanapandian; Yogeswaram; Navin Vetri
23 April 2023	Performance with Vijay Stars	Dinesh Kumar (BP); Karthik (BE)	Vinusha Devi; Raveena Daha; VJ Vishal; Myna Nandhini; VJ Deepika Lakshmanapandian; Yogeswaram; Navin Vetri
29 April 2023	Vidyasagar Special	Abhijith Anilkumar (BP); Pooja Venkatraman; Aruna Sivaya (BE)	Vidyasagar (composer)
30 April 2023	Vidyasagar Special	Abhijith Anilkumar (BP); Pooja Venkatraman; Aruna Sivaya (BE)	Vidyasagar (composer)
6 May 2023	Big Battle Round	Prasanna Adhisesha (BP); Aruna Sivaya (BE)	
7 May 2023	Big Battle Round	Prasanna Adhisesha (BP); Aruna Sivaya (BE)	
13 May 2023	Top 5 Celebration Round	Pooja Venkatraman (BP); Priya Jerson (BE)	Yuvan Shankar Raja
14 May 2023	Top 5 Celebration Round	Pooja Venkatraman (BP); Priya Jerson (BE)	Yuvan Shankar Raja
20 May 2023	Ticket to Finale	Abhijith Anilkumar	Vijay Antony
21 May 2023	Ticket to Finale	Abhijith Anilkumar	Vijay Antony
27 May 2023	Semi-finals	Aruna Sivaya; Pooja Venkatraman	Hiphop Tamizha(Adhi Ramachandran )
28 May 2023	Semi-finals	Aruna Sivaya; Pooja Venkatraman	Hiphop Tamizha(Adhi Ramachandran )
3 June 2023	Wild Card Round	Hari Vignesh; Aparna Narayanan; Karthik; Prasanna Adhisesha; Keshav Ram	Ananth Vaidyanathan; Anthony Daasan; Binni Krishnakumar
4 June 2023	Wild Card Round	Hari Vignesh; Aparna Narayanan; Karthik; Prasanna Adhisesha; Keshav Ram	Ananth Vaidyanathan; Anthony Daasan; Binni Krishnakumar
10 June 2023	Celebration Round	Aruna Sivaya Hari Vignesh Karthik	Siddharth (actor); Nivas K. Prasanna
11 June 2023	Celebration Round	Aruna Sivaya Hari Vignesh Karthik	Siddharth (actor); Nivas K. Prasanna
17 June 2023	Pre-Finals Round		Gangai Amaran; K. S. Chithra; Ananth Vaidyanathan; Pushpavanam Kuppusamy; Binni Krishnakumar
18 June 2023	Pre-Finals Round		Gangai Amaran; K. S. Chithra; Ananth Vaidyanathan; Pushpavanam Kuppusamy; Binni Krishnakumar
24 June 2023	Set Finals Round		Karthik Raja; K. S. Chithra; Ananth Vaidyanathan; Pushpavanam Kuppusamy; Binni Krishnakumar
25 June 2023	GRAND FINALE	Title Winner - Aruna Sivaya First Runner-up – Priya Jerson Second Runner-up- Prasanna Adhisesha	Harris Jayaraj
−11 June 2023

(BP) Best Performer
(BE) Best Entertainer

== Contestants ==
Name	Status
Aruna Sivaya	Winner
Priya Jerson	1st Runner-up
Prasanna Adhisesha	2nd Runner-up
Abhijith Anil Kumar	Professional Winner
Pooja Venkatraman	Professional 1st Runner-up
Dinesh Kumar	17th Elimination (13 May 2023)
Karthik	16th Elimination (6 May 2023)
Chanderan Chan	15th Elimination (22 April 2023)
Sashank	14th Elimination (8 April 2023)
Yazhini	13th Elimination (25 March 2023)
Hari Vignesh	12th Elimination (11 March 2023)
Aparna Narayanan	11th Elimination (4 March 2023)
Anantha Gopan	10th Elimination (25 February 2023)
Sneha Padmanabhan	9th Elimination (18 February 2023)
Ancy Mary	8th Elimination (11 February 2023)
Keshav Ram	7th Elimination (5 February 2023)
Priya Padmanabhan	6th Elimination (4 February 2023)
Lakshmi	5th Elimination (14 January 2023)
Nishchitha Gowda	4th Elimination (7 January 2023)
Gowri Sankar	3rd Elimination (31 December 2022)
Lavanya	2nd Elimination (24 December 2022)
Emmanual EsclEen	1st Elimination (17 December 2022)

Title Winner
First Runner-up finalist
Second Runner-up finalist
Competing contestant
Eliminated contestant
Wild card contestant
