= Super Singer 1 =

- Season 1
- Presented by: Chinmayi
- Judges: Anuradha Sriram; P. Unnikrishnan; Srinivas

Release
- Original network: STAR Vijay
- Original release: 28 April – 12 August 2006

Season chronology
- Next → Super Singer 2

Airtel Super Singer 2006 – Thamizhagathil Brahmaanda Kuralukkaana Thedal, the first season of the Airtel Super Singer show and Vijay TV's Super Singer series, was a reality TV singing competition in the Tamil language that aired on Star Vijay and was hosted by singer/voice artist Chinmayi. The judging panel of this season includes, Anuradha Sriram, P. Unnikrishnan, and Srinivas. The show first premiered on 28 April 2006, with episodes originally aired on Star Vijay on Friday and Saturday nights at 8:00 pm and Saturday and Sunday nights at 7:00 pm.

The competition promised its winner an opportunity to sing their first song as a playback singer for music director Harris Jeyaraj. Nikhil Mathew was crowned the winner of Airtel Super Singer 2006. The first runner up was Anitha V. Karthikeyan. The 2nd Runner-up was Sowmya Mahadevan.

== Auditions and audition judges ==
The first few episodes telecast open auditions for the show. People that were the age of 18 or above participated in a series of auditions held earlier in April across the state of Tamil Nadu in the cities of Coimbatore, Chennai, and Madurai. Performances by auditioning contestants were judged by a variety of celebrities including playback singers, vocalists, and music directors, such as S. P. Sailaja, Jency, Malaysia Vasudevan, D. Imman, Mahathi, and Malathi. Shortlisted candidates proceeded to main performance rounds in Chennai.

The auditions in Chennai were judged by Carnatic music vocalist Gayathri Girish, playback singer S. P. Sailaja, music director D. Imman, and singer Mahathi.

The auditions in Coimbatore were judged by playback singer Malaysia Vasudevan and singer Mahathi.

The auditions in Madurai were judged by upcoming playback singers V. V. Prasanna and Rajalakshmi at the first level of selection, and playback singers Jency and Sirkazhi Sivachidambaram at the second level of selection.

== Voice trainer, host, and judges ==
The show was hosted by playback singer/voice artist Chinmayi.

Contestant performances after the auditions were judged by a panel of permanent judges which consisted of playback singers Anuradha Sriram, Srinivas, and P. Unnikrishnan. While the latter two singers returned as permanent judges in subsequent seasons of the show, playback singer Anuradha Sriram did not return after being signed up as a permanent judge by competitor TV channel, Sun TV, in its reality music competition show, Sun Singer.

Guest judges also appeared during various rounds of the competition, including playback singer Vani Jairam, actor and director Silambarasan, actor Vikram, as well as playback singer S. P. Balasubrahmanyam who appeared as a chief guest during the grand finale.

Contestants received training from voice trainer Ananth Vaidyanathan in the final stages of the competition.

== Performance Rounds ==
=== Level 1: Introduction Round ===
In the first performance round, contestants were required to sing their choice of songs in various genres. Weakest performing contestants were eliminated by permanent judges Anuradha Sriram, Srinivas, and Unnikrishnan.

=== Level 2: Grasping Round ===
In the second performance round, permanent judges Anuradha Sriram, Srinivas, and Unnikrishnan taught the contestant a new song. The purpose of the exercise was to test how quickly each of the contestants grasp the songs they were taught. Contestants who were unable to grasp the songs within the set time were eliminated by the permanent judges.

=== Level 3: Duet Round ===
In the third performance round, the contestants were required to provide a duet performance with a fellow contestant. The purpose of the exercise was to test the contestants as to how well they adapt with a co-singer. Weakest performing contestants were eliminated by permanent judges Anuradha Sriram, Srinivas, and Unnikrishnan.

=== Level 4: Group Round ===
In the fourth performance round originally aired on 23 and 24 June 2006, playback singer Vani Jairam appeared as a special guest judge. The contestants were required to perform in small groups. The purpose of the exercise was to test how well the contestants could adjust when performing in a group, and how well the contestants could harmonise with one another. Weakest performing contestants were eliminated by permanent judges Anuradha Sriram, Srinivas, and Unnikrishnan.

=== Level 5: Emotion Round ===
In the fifth performance round originally aired on 30 June 2006 and 1 July 2006, actor and director Silambarasan ("Simbhu") appeared as a special guest judge to provide opinions from the perspective of a film-maker.

The top 12 contestants were given a choice of two challenges which they could select. The first possible challenge would require the contestant to sing the Manmatha Raasa song in a sorrowful emotion. The second possible challenge required the contestant to sing the Poraley Ponnuthayi song in a cheerful rhythm. The contestants were required to perform the song and convey the different emotion without changing the lyrics or tune of the song. The purpose of this exercise was to test how well the contestants could improvise and bring out the emotions of a song.

The top 12 contestants were divided into two groups. The first group consisted of contestants SS02 Rajani Saranathan, SS04 V. Anitha, SS07 Sowmya Mahadevan, SS10 Swathi, Sridharan, SS11 N.S. Aruna, and SS12 Priyadarshini. The second group consisted of contestants SS01 Kilgin, SS03 Maya, SS5 Gowtham Bharadwaj, SS06 Vijay Krishnan, SS08 Nithin Raj, and SS09 Nikhil Mathew. The weakest four performing contestants were eliminated by permanent judges Anuradha Sriram, Srinivas, and P. Unnikrishnan.

=== Level 6: Celebrity Round ===
In the sixth performance round originally aired on 7 and 8 July 2006, the top 8 contestants were required to perform a song with an established playback singer. The established playback singers who appeared during this round to groom the contestants and perform with the contestants were Sriram Parthasarathy, Pop Shalini, Tippu and Harini.

Permanent judges Anuradha Sriram, Srinivas, and Unnikrishnan shortlisted four contestants to advance to the finals, being contestants SS03 Maya, SS05 Goutham Bharathwaj, SS09 Nikhil Mathew, and SS04 V. Anitha in the finale. The other four contestants were eliminated from the competition by the permanent judges.

==== Finalist Competitors ====
- SS05 Gowtham Bharadwaj. V was selected from the Chennai zone, through Airtel mobile registration. Gowtham was pursuing his degree from Guru Nanak College. Gowtham has had training in classical music for 5 years from K.V Ramanujam prior to entering the competition. His ambition was to become a renowned playback singer.
- SS03 Maya was selected from the Coimbatore zone through on the spot registration. A student of the Coimbatore Institute of Technology (C.I.T), she was learning music for 8 years from Meera Kedarnathan & K.R Kedarnathan prior to entering the competition. She had learnt to play the veena and keyboard as well. Her ambition was to become a renowned playback singer. Her strengths are her voice and versatility to sing any kind of song with a unique style of her own.
- SS04 Anitha V. was selected from the Chennai zone through CD voice registration. She was working for the service industry. Anitha had training in classical music for 5 years and was a student of Hindustani music for one year from Ram Moorthy and Megna Dandekar, before entering the competition. Anitha's ambition was to become a popular playback singer. Her strengths in singing are her uniqueness in rendering any kind of song.
- SS09 Nikhil Mathew was selected from the Chennai zone through CD registration. He was pursuing his master's degree at Sathyabama College. He was being trained in music for from his guru Veeramani prior to entering the competition. His ambition was to become a playback singer. His strengths in music was his ability to sing melody and classical songs.

=== Lifeline Round ===
In the lifeline round aired from 14 July 2006 onwards, eight contestants eliminated in levels 5 and 6 were given a chance to perform again with a view of re-entering the competition. Of the eight contestants, five would be selected to re-enter the competition. The first process of selection involved viewers casting votes through SMS, tele-voting, and online voting for their favourite eliminated contestants. The second process involved permanent judges each selecting whom they considered had the greatest potential.

Contestant SS07 Sowmya Mahadevan was comfortably selected for this round after receiving 6000 votes, the greatest number of votes cast during the round. Contestant SS06 Vijaykrishnan was also selected after receiving 4500 votes, the second greatest number of votes. In addition, singer Nithyasree Mahadevan selected contestant SS10 Anusha Devi, P. Unnikrishnan selected contestant SS Archana Iyer, Srinivas selected contestant SS08 Nitin Raj, and Anuradha Sriram selected contestant Harish Sivaramakrishnan.

Viewers and the listening public were again asked to judge the performances and cast votes through SMS, tele-voting, and online voting for the five selected contestants. The contestant who received the greatest number of votes out of the five contestants would join four previously selected finalists – SS03 Maya, SS05 Goutham Bharathwaj, SS09 Nikhil Mathew, and SS04 V. Anitha in the finale.

Actor and singer Vikram appeared as a special guest during the lifeline round.

==== Lifeline Competitors ====
- SS13 Archana Iyer (T.Nagar) was selected in the Chennai zone and was an architecture student who had training in Carnatic music for 8 years prior to entering the competition.
- SS14 Harish Sivaramakrishnan (Sallikiramam) was selected in the Chennai zone, and worked for a software company in Bangalore. He was passionate about singing.
- SS07 Sowmya Mahadevan (Kodambakkam) was selected in the Chennai zone, and had classical music training for 5 years prior to entering the competition. She was a student of Meenakshi College, Kodambakkam.
- SS08 Nithin Raj (Koduverepakkam) was selected in the Madurai zone, and was studying literature. He was passionate about singing, and hoped to become a playback singer.
- SS06 Vijay Krishnan (Rayapet) was selected in the Chennai zone, and was a student of the PSG college, Coimbatore. He had classical training for 5 years prior to entering the competition.
- SS10 Anusha devi (Mettupalayam) was selected in the coimbatore zone, and was studying Diploma. She was passionate about singing, and hoped to become a playback singer.

==== Lifeline result ====
The contestant who received the greatest number of votes from the viewers after the lifeline round was contestant SS14 Harish Sivaramakrishnan.

=== Finals ===
Judges for the finals included Malaysia Vasudevan, K. S. Chithra, and Ananth Vaidyanathan.

Each of the finalists were required to perform a fast song and a slow song, back-to-back.

=== Grand Finale (4 August 2006) ===
The grand finale telecast on 4 August 2006 was held at the studio set a couple of days earlier. The chief guest for the grand finale was renowned playback singer, S. P. Balasubrahmanyam, who announced the name of the winner of the competition.

==== Grand Finale results ====
Finalist Anitha V. was announced as runner up and viewer's choice at the finale after receiving more than 50,000 votes from the public, and thereby receiving the greatest number of viewer votes. Finalist Sowmya Mahadevan won the jury award after receiving the highest number of votes from the lifeline round. Contestant Nikhil Mathew was announced as the title winner.

=== Bloopers (5 August 2006) ===
This episode consisted of bloopers from the season.

=== Celebration Round (11 and 12 August 2006) ===
These episodes were a celebration round which concluded the season.
