= Super Singer 6 =

- Season 6
- Logo of Super Singer 6
- Presented by: Makapa Anand, Priyanka Deshpande
- Judges: Anuradha Sriram; P. Unnikrishnan; Benny Dayal; Shweta Mohan
- No. of episodes: 50

Release
- Original network: Vijay TV
- Original release: 21 January – 15 July 2018

Season chronology
- ← Previous; Super Singer 5 Next → Super Singer 7

Nippon Paint Super Singer 6 was a 2018 Indian Tamil language Reality singing competition show, the sixth season of the Super Singer show, which aired on Star Vijay on every Saturday and Sunday at 19:00 (IST) starting from 21 January 2018 until 15 July 2018. Nippon Paint sponsored the season after Airtel discontinued its sponsoring. The show was hosted by Makapa Anand and Priyanka Deshpande. The Judges of the show were the popular playback singers Anuradha Sriram, P. Unnikrishnan, Benny Dayal and Shweta Mohan. The Grand finale was held on 15 July 2018 at Jawaharlal Nehru Indoor Stadium, Chennai and was a live telecast through Star Vijay. Golden voice Rakshitha, Sreekanth, Shakthi, Anirudh, Malavika and Senthil Ganesh were the final 6 contestants. Folk singer Senthil Ganesh emerged as the title winner of the show who also got a chance to sing in A.R. Rahman's music and the versatile singer Golden voice of super singer 6 Rakshitha emerged as first runner up with 2.5 million and a title golden voice of the season and Sreekanth impressed A. R. Rahman sir by his set final performance and got a chance to sing in his music. Malavika emerged as 2nd runners up with cash price of 300,000.

== Hosts ==
- Makapa Anand
- Priyanka Deshpande

== Main Judges ==
- Anuradha Sriram
- P. Unnikrishnan
- Benny Dayal
- Shweta Mohan

== Main competition ==
The winner of this season was Senthil Ganesh and the first runner up was Rakshita Suresh and the second runner up was Malavika Rajesh Vaidiya, whereas the other finalists includes Suswaram Anirudh, Sreekanth Hariharan, Sakthi Amaran
