= Nikhil Mathew =

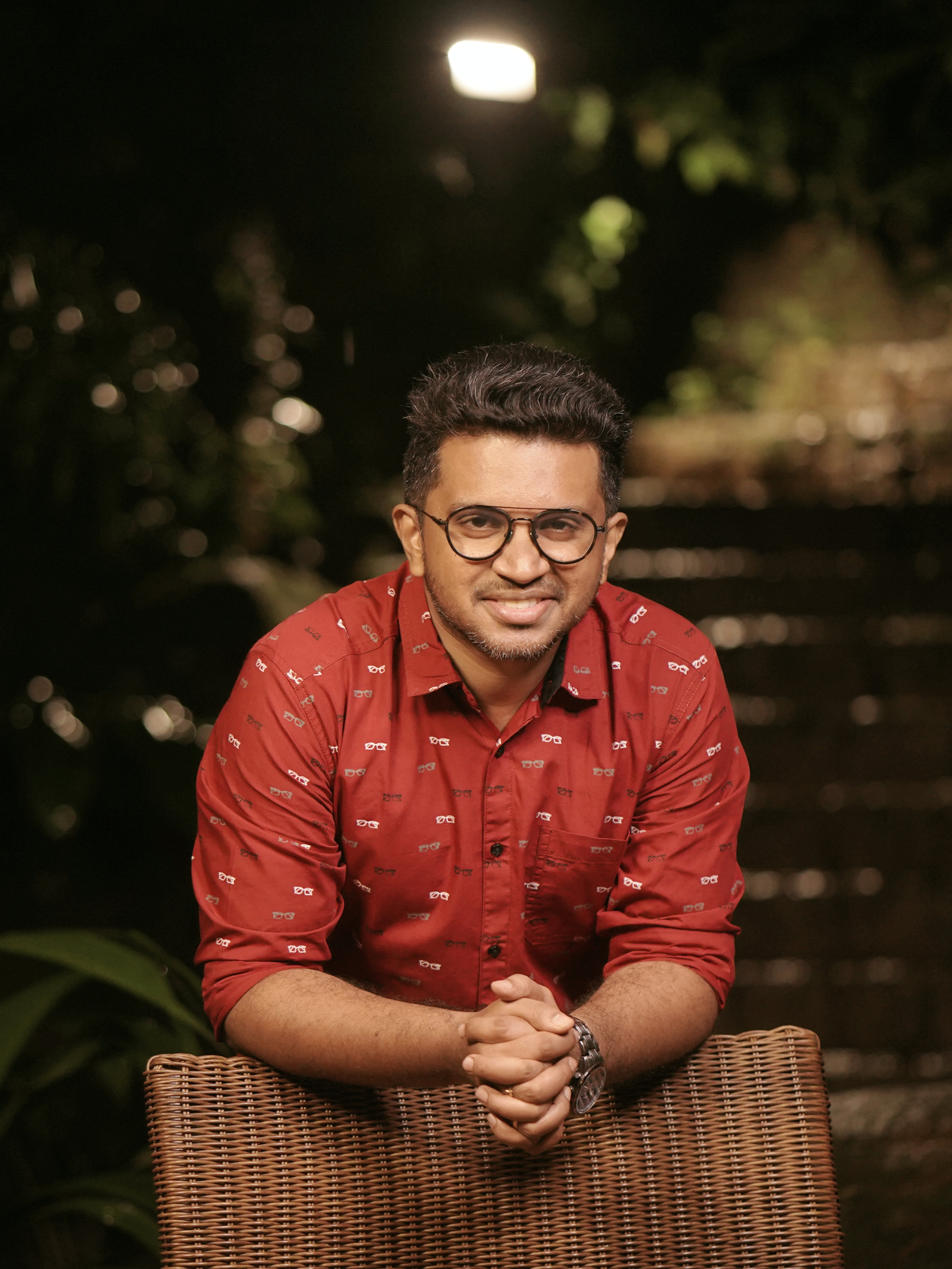

Background information
- Born: 23 October 1983 (age 42)
- Origin: Kottayam, Kerala
- Genres: Classical, Indian, world music
- Occupations: Singer
- Years active: 2006–present

Nikhil Mathew is a singer from Kerala, India. In 2006, he won the first season of the Airtel Super Singer reality show. As the show's winner, he won a chance to sing a song for music director Harris Jayaraj – Enadhuyire along with Chinmayi, Sadhana Sargam, and Sowmya Raoh for the Tamil film Bheema.

== Discography ==
Year	Song	Film/ Album	Language	Music director	Producer by	Note(s)
2006	"Nilavinte Thooval"	Moonnamathoral	Malayalam	Ouseppachan		
2008	"Enadhuyire"	Bheemaa	Tamil	Harris Jayaraj		
2010	"Cmon Cmon"	Thakita Thakita	Telugu	Bobo Sasi		
2011	Ambu Thoduthival	Badrinath	Telugu	M. M. Keeravani		
2011	"Prema Desam"	Shakthi	Telugu	Mani Sharma		
2011	"That is Mahalakshmi"	100% Love	Telugu	Devi Sri Prasad		
2012	"Hey Snehithiye"	Perumaan	Tamil	Vikram		
2012	"Azhalinte Azhangalil"	Ayalum Njanum Thammil	Malayalam	Ouseppachan		
2012	"Kaarmukilil"	Bachelor Party	Malayalam	Rahul Raj		
2012	"Orkut Oru Ormakoottu"	Orkut Oru Ormakoottu	Malayalam	Girish		
2012	"Sirikirale"	Pachai Engira Kaathu	Tamil	Haribabu		
2013	"Hailesa Lesa"	Pullipulikalum Aattinkuttiyum	Malayalam	Vidyasagar		
2013	"Yenakana Oru Varthai"	Nayak	Telugu	S. Thaman		Tamil Dubbed version
2014	"Endrendrum"	Endrendrum	Tamil	Dharan		
2014	"Aha Mazhayum Illai"	Manasunu Maaya Seyake	Telugu	Manikanth Kadri		Bilingual movie
2014	"Maya Theeram"	Angry Babies in Love	Malayalam	Bijibal		
2014	"Shoonyamai"	Paathshala	Telugu	Rahul Raj		
2014	"Viralthumbu Neetti"	Little Superman 3D	Malayalam	Mohan Sithara		
2015	"Mudhal Murai Ithayam"	Iruvar Ondranal	Tamil	Guru Krishnan		
2016	"Thangatha Urasa Aasai"	Maayilai Thoranam	Tamil	Dev Guru		
2016	"Cherupunjiri"	Maheshinte Prathikaaram	Malayalam	Bijibal		
2016	"Roja Poo Pola"	Saaral	Tamil	Ishaan Dev		
2016	"Pon Olive Ilakal"	Dooram	Malayalam	Mohammed Rizwan		
2016	"Maaripoove"	Popcorn	Malayalam	Leela Girish Kuttan		
2016	"Raavamma"	Janaki Ramudu	Telugu	Gifton Elias		
2017	"Giji Giji Sare"	Brindhavanam	Tamil	Vishal Chandrasekhar		
2017	"Usurulo Usuruga"	Balloon	Tamil	Yuvan Shankar Raja		
2017	"Podhum Otha Solla"	Guru Uchaththula Irukkaru	Tamil	Taj Noor		
2018	"Ore Nila Ore Veyil"	BTech	Malayalam	Rahul Raj		
2019	"Meene Chembulli Meene"	Thottappan	Malayalam	Leela L. Girish Kuttan		
2023	"Mayilara Kanave"	Manasi	Tamil	Shivaram		
2025	"Kan Imaikaiyil"	Kan Imaikaiyil	Tamil	Sri Krish	Vasanth Ramasamy	Album for Giant Music India

== Television ==
Year	Name of Television Show	Role	Channel	Notes
2006	Super Singer Season 1	Contestant	Star Vijay	Title Winner
2009	Super Singer Junior season 2	Audition Judge	Star Vijay	
2011	Super Singer Junior season 3	Audition Judge	Star Vijay	
2012	Super Singer T20 Season 1	Contestant	Star Vijay	Captain of Innisai Indians team
2015	Super Singer T20 Season 2	Contestant	Star Vijay	Captain of Varuthapadatha Padagar team
2024	Super Singer Season 10	Guest performer	Star Vijay	
2025	Super Singer Junior season 10	Guest performer	Star Vijay	Performed along with Nasreen

== Awards and nominations ==
Year	Award	Category	Capacity	Work	Outcome	Notes
2013	Mirchi Awards	Best Song of the year	Singer	"Azhalinte Azhangalil" from Ayalum Njanum Thammil	Won	
2013	Big FM Melody Awards	Manassil Thotta Singer	Singer	"Azhalinte Azhangalil" from Ayalum Njanum Thammil	Won	
