= Super Singer 11 =

- Season 11
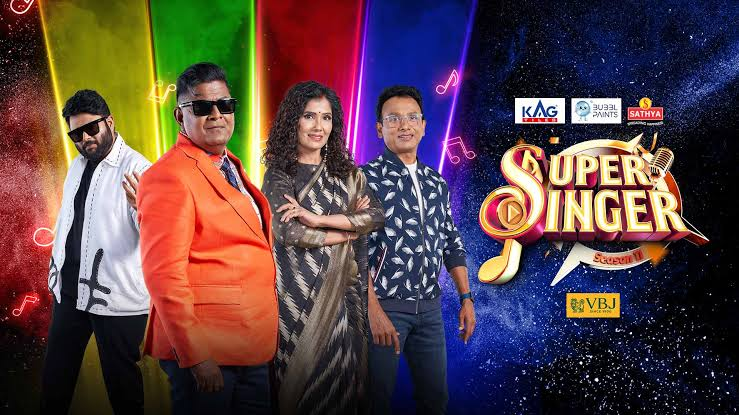
- Super Singer 11 Judges
- No. of episodes: 52

Release
- Original network: Star Vijay
- Original release: 2 August 2025 – 1 February 2026
- Presented by: Ma Ka Pa Anand; Priyanka Deshpande
- Judges: Anuradha Sriram; P. Unnikrishnan; Mysskin; Thaman S (Episode 1-12); Gangai Amaran (Episode 17-52)
- Winner: Nikhil
- Runners-up: Saran; Dishathana

Season chronology
- ← Previous; Super Singer 10 Next → super Singer 12

Super Singer Season 11 is a 2025-2026 Indian Tamil-language reality television singing competition show on Star Vijay. The 11th season of Super Singer premiered on 2 August 2025 and airs on every Saturday and Sunday at 18:30, and streams on Disney+ Hotstar.

Ma Ka Pa Anand and Priyanka Deshpande return as hosts for this season with the judges. The judging panel for this season included four judges: two playback singers, Anuradha Sriram and P. Unnikrishnan, music composer Thaman S and Mysskin. The show has four different regional zone identities within the state of Tamil Nadu. Anuradha Sriram will represent Kongu Thamizh, Mysskin will embody Delta Thamizh, Thaman S will be the face of Chennai Thamizh, and P. Unnikrishnan will Engum Thamizh. Due to some issues, Thaman S didn't continue as judge till last. So, Gangai Amaran replaced his place.

This season made a history in Super Singer (including Super Singer Senior and Super Singer junior) first time, that this season there were 7 Finalists.

In the Grand Finale, Nikhil emerged as the title winner and got ₹60 Lakh apartment from DAC Developer in the season and Saran and Dishathana shared the 1st Runner-up got ₹10 Lakhs each (One by DAC & Another by Star Vijay Team), and Meenatchi emerged as the 2nd Runner-up of the season and got ₹5 Lakhs, Thavaseeli emerged as 3rd Runner-up and got ₹3 Lakhs, Abraham Nithya Pandian emerged as the 4th Runner-up and got ₹3 Lakhs in the season. Balapriya won the VBJ Golden voice of the season and got golden mike trophy and 10 Lakhs from VBJ Jewellers.

== Production ==
Season 11 began on 2 August 2025 as scheduled. In March 2025, an Audition promo was released on Star Vijay's social media platforms. The show is a competition where the top contestants will be teamed with four judges teams, like Kongu Thamizh, Delta Thamizh, Chennai Thamizh, and Engum Thamizh are competing against each other.

== Judges ==
Judges	Description	Ref
Anuradha Sriram	She is an Indian carnatic and playback singer and child actress who hails from the Indian state of Tamil Nadu.	
P. Unnikrishnan	He is an Indian Carnatic vocalist and playback singer.	
Thaman S (Episode 1–12)	Is an Indian composer and playback singer known for his works majorly in Telugu and Tamil cinema.	
Mysskin	Is a Tamil film director, screenwriter, lyricist, playback singer, actor, film producer and composer.	
Gangai Amaran (Episode 17–52)	Is an Indian composer, playback singer, lyricist, actor, film director and a screenwriter in Tamil films.	

== Hosts ==
Host	Notes
Makapa Anand	Indian television presenter, host and actor. He predominantly works in Tamil television and film industry.
Priyanka Deshpande	Indian television presenter, host and actress. She predominantly works in Tamil television and film industry.

== Contestants Group ==
Team	Contestants
Chennai Thamizh (~~Thaman S~~; Gangai Amaran)	Abraham Nithya Pandiyan
Chennai Thamizh (~~Thaman S~~; Gangai Amaran)	Thavaseeli
Chennai Thamizh (~~Thaman S~~; Gangai Amaran)	Dharshana
Chennai Thamizh (~~Thaman S~~; Gangai Amaran)	Varsha
Chennai Thamizh (~~Thaman S~~; Gangai Amaran)	Hrudhay
Chennai Thamizh (~~Thaman S~~; Gangai Amaran)	Poomanikandan
Engum Thamizh (P. Unnikrishnan)	Annbenson
Engum Thamizh (P. Unnikrishnan)	Adithyan
Engum Thamizh (P. Unnikrishnan)	Farhan
Engum Thamizh (P. Unnikrishnan)	Meenakshi
Engum Thamizh (P. Unnikrishnan)	Greeshma Kannan
Engum Thamizh (P. Unnikrishnan)	Chinnaparaj
Kongu Thamizh (Anuradha Sriram)	Nikhil
Kongu Thamizh (Anuradha Sriram)	Ashwini
Kongu Thamizh (Anuradha Sriram)	Madhura Balaji
Kongu Thamizh (Anuradha Sriram)	Pradeep Nivas
Kongu Thamizh (Anuradha Sriram)	Dishathana
Kongu Thamizh (Anuradha Sriram)	Mano Eswaran
Delta Thamizh (Mysskin)	Saran
Delta Thamizh (Mysskin)	Kugapriyan
Delta Thamizh (Mysskin)	Vengadachalam
Delta Thamizh (Mysskin)	Balapriya
Delta Thamizh (Mysskin)	Vignesh Kabali
Delta Thamizh (Mysskin)	Sai Varshini

*The color denotes their team colors

*From Episode 27 the group competitive rounds stopped and individual competitive rounds was started.

== Contestant status ==
S.No	Contestant	Episode entered	Episode exited	Golden voice of the week	Contestant Status
1	Nikhil	Episode 01	Episode 52	-	Winner
2	Dishathana	Episode 01	Episode 52	3	1st Runner-up
3	Saran	Episode 01	Episode 52	3	1st Runner-up
4	Meenakshi	Episode 01	Episode 52	2	2nd Runner-up
5	Thavaseeli	Episode 01	Episode 52	3	3rd Runner-up
6	Abraham Nithya Pandian	Episode 01	Episode 45	-	Eliminated
6	Abraham Nithya Pandian	Episode 48	Episode 52	-	4th Runner-up
7	Dharshana	Episode 01	Episode 45	3	Eliminated
7	Dharshana	Episode 48	Episode 52	3	5th Runner-up
8	Balapriya	Episode 01	Episode 45	4	Eliminated
8	Balapriya	Episode 01	Episode 45	4	VBJ GOLDEN VOICE OF THE SEASON
9	Ann Benson	Episode 01	Episode 45	-	Eliminated
10	Farhan	Episode 01	Episode 45	-	Eliminated
11	Hrudhay	Episode 01	Episode 37	-	Eliminated
12	Poomanikandan	Episode 01	Episode 37	-	Eliminated
13	Vignesh kabali	Episode 01	Episode 33	-	Eliminated
14	Madhura Balaji	Episode 01	Episode 29	-	Eliminated
15	Greeshma Kannan	Episode 01	Episode 25	-	Eliminated
16	Vengadachalam	Episode 01	Episode 25	-	Eliminated
17	Mano Eswaran	Episode 01	Episode 20	-	Eliminated
18	Varsha	Episode 01	Episode 20	-	Eliminated
19	Ashwini	Episode 01	Episode 14	-	Eliminated
20	Chinnapparaj	Episode 01	Episode 14	-	Eliminated
21	Pradeep Nivas	Episode 01	Episode 10	-	Eliminated
22	Sai Varshini	Episode 01	Episode 10	-	Eliminated
23	Adithyan	Episode 01	Episode 08	-	Eliminated
24	Kugapriyan	Episode 01	Episode 08	-	Eliminated

== Episodes ==
Week	Episodes	Airing	Round	Notes
1	1	2 August 2025	Mega Audition	Introduction rounds
1	2	3 August 2025	Mega Audition	Introduction rounds
2	3	9 August 2025	K S Chitra special	K S Chitra as Judge
2	4	10 August 2025	K S Chitra special	K S Chitra as Judge
3	5	16 August 2025	Endrum Captain Vijayakanth	Sukanya as Judge
3	6	17 August 2025	Endrum Captain Vijayakanth	Sukanya as Judge
4	7	23 August 2025	Free Style	Vijay Antony as Judge
4	8	24 August 2025	Free Style	Kugapriyan and Adithiyan were eliminated in double elimination after securing low marks, there will be a second chance for them in wildcard round.
5	9	30 August 2025	Thiruvizha round	Pradeep Nivas and Sai Varshini were eliminated in double elimination after securing low marks, there will be a second chance for them in wildcard round.
5	10	31 August 2025	Thiruvizha round	Pradeep Nivas and Sai Varshini were eliminated in double elimination after securing low marks, there will be a second chance for them in wildcard round.
6	11	6 September 2025	Tribute to Na. Muthukumar	Seeman, Karthik Netha, Uthara Unnikrishnan, Vetrimaran, Anjali Sivaraman and Varsha Bharath as guest
6	12	7 September 2025	Tribute to Na. Muthukumar	Seeman, Karthik Netha, Uthara Unnikrishnan, Vetrimaran, Anjali Sivaraman and Varsha Bharath as guest
7	13	13 September 2025	Duet round	Santhosh Narayanan as Judge, Arjun Das, D Imman, Vishal Venkat as guest, Meenakshi Santhosh Narayanan as guest.
7	14	14 September 2025	Duet round	Chinnaparaj and Ashwini were eliminated in double elimination after securing low marks, there will be a second chance for them in wildcard round.
8	15	20 September 2025	Mega Sangamam with CWC Team	Cooku With Comali Season 6 Team as guest
8	16	21 September 2025	Mega Sangamam with CWC Team	Cooku With Comali Season 6 Team as guest
9	17	27 September 2025	Celebrating Isaignani Ilayaraja with Super Singer Stars	Yuvan Shankar Raja ,Venkat Prabhu ,Vijay Yesudas, Gangai Amaran as Special Judges.
9	18	28 September 2025	Celebrating Isaignani Ilayaraja with Super Singer Stars	Yuvan Shankar Raja ,Venkat Prabhu ,Vijay Yesudas, Gangai Amaran as Special Judges.
9	19	4 October 2025	Celebrating Isaignani Ilayaraja with Super Singer Stars	Yuvan Shankar Raja ,Venkat Prabhu ,Vijay Yesudas, Gangai Amaran as Special Judges.
10	20	11 October 2025	Anbulla Amma(Contestants dedicating songs to his/her mom)	Gangai Amaran as Special Judge.
10	21	12 October 2025	Anbulla Amma(Contestants dedicating songs to his/her mom)	Gangai Amaran as Special Judge.
10	22	18 October 2025	Anbulla Amma(Contestants dedicating songs to his/her mom)	Gangai Amaran as Special Judge.
10	23	19 October 2025	Anbulla Amma(Contestants dedicating songs to his/her mom)	Mano Eswaran and Varsha were eliminated in double elimination after securing low marks, there will be a second chance for them in wildcard round.
11	24	25 October 2025	Celebrating with vijay stars	Actress Radha as a special judge
11	25	26 October 2025	Celebrating with vijay stars	Vengadachalam and Greeshma Kannan were eliminated in double elimination after securing low marks, there will be a second chance for them in wildcard round.
12	26	1 November 2025	Bakthi Thiruvizha (Devotional round)	Mahalingam, T.L Maharajan, and Veeramani as guest.
12	27	2 November 2025	Bakthi Thiruvizha (Devotional round)	Mahalingam, T.L Maharajan, and Veeramani as guest.
13	28	8 November 2025	Radio hits	Aanpavam Polladhadhu movie team as guest to promote their movie.
13	29	9 November 2025	Radio hits	Madhura Balaji was eliminated after securing low marks, there will be a second chance for her in wildcard round.
14	30	15 November 2025	Rock n Roll	Imman as a special judge and balraj and prakash as a special guest.
14	31	16 November 2025	Rock n Roll	Imman as a special judge and balraj and prakash as a special guest.
15	32	22 November 2025	Nila sutru (Moon songs round)	Gangai Amaran as a special judge.Kavin and Andrea as a special guest to promote their movie Mask.
15	33	23 November 2025	Nila sutru (Moon songs round)	Vignesh Kabali was eliminated after securing low marks, there will be a second chance for him in wildcard round.
16	34	29 November 2025	One on One round	Super Singer stars as a special judges.
16	35	30 November 2025	One on One round	Super Singer stars as a special judges.
17	36	6 December 2025	Silk Round	Hema Malini and Anuradha who are friends of Silk as a special guest.
17	37	7 December 2025	Silk Round	Poomanikandan and Hrudhay were eliminated in double elimination after securing low marks, there will be a second chance for them in wildcard round
18	38	13 December 2025	Get-up and Performance round and Ticket to Finale.	The music director CS Sam as a special judge.
18	39	14 December 2025	Get-up and Performance round and Ticket to Finale.	Nikhil emerged as the 1st Finalist of Super Singer.
19	40	20 December 2025	Village kadhal round and Ticket to Finale Round 2.	The music director Nivas K Prasana as a special judge.
19	41	21 December 2025	Village kadhal round and Ticket to Finale Round 2.	Judges cancelled ticket to finale Round 2 as no one performed Ticket to Finale performance.
20	42	27 December 2025	ARR round and Ticket to Finale Round 3 (Selection of 2nd and 3rd Finalist).	As it is the music director AR Rahman's round his sister A. R. Reihana and Santhosh Dhayanidhi as a special guest Sujatha Mohan as a special new judge of Super Singer Season 11.
20	43	28 December 2025	ARR round and Ticket to Finale Round 3 (Selection of 2nd and 3rd Finalist).	The 2nd Finalist of Super Singer was directly given to dishathana before seeing every contestants performance as she gave an extraordinary performance.
20	43	28 December 2025	ARR round and Ticket to Finale Round 3 (Selection of 2nd and 3rd Finalist).	Meenakshi emerged as the 3rd Finalist of Super Singer.
21	44	3 January 2026	Semi Finals	Gangai Amaran as a special judge.
21	44	3 January 2026	Semi Finals	Thavaseeli emerged as the 4th Finalist of Super Singer.
21	45	4 January 2026	Semi Finals	Saran emerged as the 5th Finalist of Super Singer.
21	45	4 January 2026	Semi Finals	Balapriya, Abraham Nithya Pandian, Farhan, Darshana, Ann Benson were eliminated after securing low marks in semi finals and failed to be a finalist, there will be a second chance for them in wildcard round(Next Week).
22	46	10 January 2026	Wildcard Round 1	Super Singer stars as special judges.
22	46	10 January 2026	Wildcard Round 1	Contestants eliminated before Top 10 selection participated (Varsha, Hrudhay, Mano, Greeshma, Madhura, Vignesh & Poomani). Super Singerstars selected Hrudhay and Varsha to Round 2.
22	47	11 January 2026	Wildcard Round 2	Super Singer stars, Anuradha Sriram, P. Unnikrishnan, and Myskin as judges.
22	47	11 January 2026	Wildcard Round 2	Contestants eliminated in Semi Finals and Hrudhay and Varsha participated in Round 2.
22	48	17 January 2026	Wildcard Round 2	Darshana emerged as the 6th Finalist and returned as wildcard Finalist of Super Singer.
22	48	17 January 2026	Wildcard Round 2	Abraham Nithya Pandian emerged as the 7th Finalist and returned as wildcard Finalist of Super Singer.
22	48	17 January 2026	Finalists of Super Singer	Nikhil, Dishathana, Meenakshi, Thavaseeli, Saran, Dharshana, and Abraham are the Finalists of Super Singer.
23	49	24 January 2026	Pre-Finale Celebration	With Love movie team as a special guest. Gopinath as a special guest to encourage the finalists. Super Singer 11 stars gave a special performance to Gangai Amaran.
23	50	25 January 2026	Pre-Finale Celebration	With Love movie team as a special guest. Gopinath as a special guest to encourage the finalists. Super Singer 11 stars gave a special performance to Gangai Amaran.
24	51	31 January 2026	Celebration	Super Singer finalists and judges shared their favourite moments and they honoured Super Singer Trainers and mani and band.
24	52	1 February 2026	Grand Finale	KS Chitra as a special judge as a part of finale. Most of the vijay stars joined as a part of finale, audiences are also allowed to see live the finale.
VBJ Golden Voice of the Season
Winner		Balapriya		
Grand Finale
5th runner-up		Darshana		
4th runner-up		Abraham Nithya Pandian		
3rd Runner-up		Thavaseeli		
2nd Runner-up		Meenatchi		
1st Runner-up		Saran		
1st Runner-up		Dishathana		
Winner		Nikhil		

== Finalists ==
S.no	Contestants	Finalist	Status
1	Nikhil	1st Finalist	Winner
2	Dishathana	2nd Finalist	1st Runner-up
3	Meenakshi	3rd Finalist	2nd Runner-up
4	Thavaseeli	4th Finalist	3rd Runner-up
5	Saran	5th Finalist	1st Runner-up
6	Darshana	6th Finalist	5th Runner-up
7	Abraham Nithya Pandian	7th Finalist	4th Runner-up

== Grand Finale ==
=== Grand Finale Performance ===
There are 2 rounds in which the 7 finalist will participate and who score high marks and more votes from the audience the Winner, Runner-up and so on position will be given. The order of contestants are arranged in the order of Finalist.

Round 1

Episode : 52

Air Date	Contestant	Song	Film
1 February 2026	Nikhil	Kadavul Amaithu Vaitha Medai	Aval Oru Thodarkathai
1 February 2026	Dishathana	Evano Oruvan	Alaipayuthey
1 February 2026	Meenatchi	Singaravelane Deva	Konjum Salangai
1 February 2026	Thavaseeli	Pattathu Rani Paarkum Paarvai	Sivandha Mann
1 February 2026	Saran	Ada Veetuku Veetuku Vaasapadi Venum	Kizhakku Vasal
1 February 2026	Darshana	Agnikunjondru Kanden	Uriyadi
1 February 2026	Abraham Nithya Pandian	Mun Paniya	Nandha

Round 2

Episode : 52

Air Date	Contestant	Song	Film
1 February 2026	Nikhil	Ennadi Meenakshi	Ilamai Oonjal Aadukirathu
1 February 2026	Dishathana	Utchanthala Otukkulla	Maamannan
1 February 2026	Dishathana	Theekkoluthi	Bison
1 February 2026	Meenatchi	Anjali Anjali Pushpanjali	Duet
1 February 2026	Thavaseeli	Vaa Vaa Pakkam Vaa	Thanga Magan
1 February 2026	Saran	Jin Jinukaan	Rajapart Rangadurai
1 February 2026	Darshana	Vinveli Nayaga	Thug Life
1 February 2026	Abraham Nithya Pandian	Arjunaru Villu	Ghilli
