= Super Singer 2 =

- Season 2
- Logo
- Presented by: Chinmayi; Hayma Malini; Yugendran
- Judges: Sujatha Mohan; P. Unnikrishnan; Srinivas

Release
- Original network: STAR Vijay
- Original release: 7 July 2008 – 3 June 2009

Season chronology
- ← Previous; Super Singer 1 Next → Super Singer 3

Airtel Super Singer 2, the second season of the music competition reality show Airtel Super Singer, premiered on 7 July 2008. Episodes were telecasted on Star Vijay between Monday and Wednesday. Judges for the show were Sujatha Mohan, P. Unnikrishnan and Srinivas. Chinmayi was the host of the show until January 2009 and was followed by Malini Yugendran (Hayma Malini) and Yugendran Vasudevan Nair. The voice trainer was Ananth Vaidyanathan.

The Grand Finale was held on 3 June 2009 at YMCA Royapettah, Chennai. At the finals, Ajeesh won the competition. Ravi and Renu took the second and third positions respectively. Ajeesh was chosen by Yuvan Shankar Raja to sing the song Idhu Varai for the Tamil movie, Goa. The audio for the movie for released in December 2009.

== Grand Finale 3 June 2009 ==
- Ravi
1. "Kanmuney" (film: Thulluvadho Ilamai, singer: Yuvan Shankar Raja)
2. "Kallai Mattum" (film: Dasavathaaram, singer: Hariharan)
- Renu
1. "Hai rama oru vaarama" (Swarnalatha)(film: Rangeela)
2. "Nenjodu Kalanthidu" (Sujatha)(film: 7G Rainbow Colony)
- Ajeesh
1. "Sangeetha Jaathi Mullai Kanavillai" (singer:S.P.B)(film: Kadhal Oviyam)
2. "Ninaithu Ninaithu" (singer: KK)(film: 7G Rainbow Colony)

== Finalists ==
- Ravi
1. "Oru naal podhuma" (M. Balamuralikrishna, K. V. Mahadevan)
2. "Ooh Mama" (Shankar Mahadevan, Tippu, Harris Jayaraj from Minnale)
3. "In the End" (Linkin Park)
4. "Unakkenna Mele Nindrai" (from Simla Special)
- Ranjani
1. "Porale ponnuthaayi" Swarnalatha
2. "Kannodu Kaanbathellam" (Nithyashree, A. R. Rahman from Jeans)
3. "Paalvadiyum Mugam" (Maharajapuram Santhanam, Oothukkadu Venkata Subbaier)
4. "Jill Endru Oru Kaadhal" (Tanvi Shah, A. R. Rahman from Sillunu Oru Kaadhal)
5. "The Winner Takes It All" (ABBA)
- Ajesh
1. "Adal Kalaye" (K. J. Yesudas, Illayaraja from Sri Raghavendra)
2. "Muralidara Gopala" (M. L. Vasanthakumari)
3. "Girlfriend" (Karthik, Tippu and Timmy, A. R. Rahman from Boys)
4. "One Love" (Blue)
5. "Kaatukuyile" (from Thalapathi)
- Renu
1. "Kanda Naal Mudhalai" (Subhiksha and Pooja, Yuvan Shankar Raja from Kanda Naal Mudhal)
2. "Mudhal Naal" (K. K. Mahalakshmi and Shalini, Harris Jayaraj from Unnale Unnale)
3. "Unfaithful" (Rihanna)
- Prasanna
1. "Sangeetha Jaathimullai Kaanavillai" (S. P. Balasubrahmanyam, Illayaraja from Kadhal Oviyam)
2. "Venkatachala Nilayam" (Purandara Dasa)
3. "Something Something" (Tippu, Devi Sri Prasad from Something Something... Unnakum Ennakum)
4. "Bailamos" (Enrique Iglesias)

== Semi finals ==
- Ajeesh
1. "Thoongatha Vizhigal" (K. J. Yesudas, from Agni Nakshatram)
2. "Elangaathu Veesudhey" (Sriram Parthasarathy, from Pithamagan)
- Ravi
1. "Rasathi Unna" (Jayachandran, from Vaidehi Kaathirundaal)
2. "Kalaivaniye" (K. J. Yesudas, from Sindhu Bhairavi)
- Renu
1. "Edhedho Ennam Valarthen" (K. S. Chithra, from Punnagai Mannan)
2. "Anandha raagam" (Uma Ramanan)
3. "Unna Vida" (Shreya Ghoshal, from Virumaandi)
- Vijay Narayan
1. "Isayil Thodanguthamma" (Ajay Chakraborthy, Illayaraja from Hey Ram)
2. "Sadho Sadho" (Hindustani)
3. "Uyirin Uyirae" (Kay Kay, Suchitra, Harris Jayaraj from Kaakha Kaakha)
4. "Hotel California" (Eagles)
- Raginisri
1. "Ellam Enbamayam" (M. L. Vasanthakumari and P. Leela from )
2. "Unakkena Naan" (Ramya NSK, Vijay Antony from Kadhalil Vizhundhen)
3. "I attempt from love's sickness to fly" (Henry Purcell)
4. "Vegam Vegam" (Usha Uthup from Anjali)

== Elimination chart ==
Legend
Did Not Perform	Female	Male	Airtel Super Singer 2008

Safe	Spot selected (Spot)	Wait listed (WL)	Eliminated (Elim)	Promoted by judges (P)	Immunity (I)

Stage:		Finals																																															
Genre:		Emotions Round			Singing with Legends			Unplugged Fusion			Kaviyin Kural			Patriotic Songs of AR Rahman			Recall Round #1			Recall Round #2			Disco			Folk			Black & White			Classical			Western			Relationships			Quarter Final: Unplugged Strings			Semi Final: Songs of Ilaiyaraja			WildCard Round		
Week:		12/29	12/30	12/31	1/5	1/6	1/7	1/12	1/13	1/14	1/19	1/20	1/21	1/26	1/27	1/28	2/2	2/3	2/4	2/9	2/10	2/11	2/16	2/17	2/18	2/23	2/24	2/25	3/2	3/3	3/4	3/9	3/10	3/11	3/16	3/17	3/18	3/23	3/24	3/25	3/30	3/31	4/1	4/6	4/7	4/8	4/13	4/14	4/15
Place	Contestant	Result																																															
1	Ajesh				Spot					P			P			P								Spot									WL	P		WL	P	WL	P		WL	WL	P			Finalist			
2	Ravi						P			P	I					P								Spot								Spot			Spot			WL	P		I					Finalist			
3	Renu						P			P			P			P							WL	P									Spot			Spot		WL	WL	P	I					Finalist			
4	Ranjani						P			P			I/P			P								WL/P									WL	P	Spot			WL	WL	P	WL	P				Elim			
5	Vijaynarain					Spot				P			Elim						WL			P	WL	P									WL	P	Spot			WL	WL	P	WL	WL	P			Elim			
6	RaginiSri						Elim												WL			P	WL		P								Spot			Spot		I			WL	WL	Elim						
7	Prasanna						P			P			P			P							Spot										WL	P		Spot		WL	WL	Elim									
8	Rohit						P			P		I				P							WL		P				A	A	Elim																		
9	Aruna																		P					WL	P			Elim																					
10	Aravind N.V																		WL			P		WL	Elim																								
11	Aishwarya																		WL			Elim																											
11	Bhargavi																		WL			Elim																											
11	Bharathiraja																		WL			Elim																											
11	Madhumitha.R																		WL			Elim																											
11	Madhumitha.S																		WL			Elim																											
11	Santhosh																		WL			Elim																											
