= Choo Mandhirakaali =

2021 Tamil film by Eswar Kotravai

- Promotion poster
- Directed by: Eswar Kotravai
- Written by: Eswar Kotravai
- Produced by: Annakkili Velu
- Starring: Karthikeyan Velu; Sanjana Burli
- Cinematography: Mohammed Farhan
- Edited by: Gokul G
- Music by: Satish Raghunathan
- Production company: Annam Medias
- Distributed by: Annam Medias
- Release date: 24 September 2021
- Running time: 127 minutes
- Country: India
- Language: Tamil

Choo Mandhirakaali is a 2021 Indian Tamil-language magical realism romantic comedy film written and directed by newcomer Eswar Kotravai, former associate of director A. Sarkunam. It stars debutant Karthikeyan Velu and debutante Sanjana Burli, with Kishore Dev, Muhil, Govinth Mayon, and V. Sridhar in supporting roles. The film was made in one shot schedule and released on 24 September 2021 and became one of the top-rated Tamil movies of 2021.

== Plot ==
Pangaaliyur is a village in Salem district. Everyone in this village is related as cousins (Pangaali in English is "cousin"; i.e., cousin brother / cousin sister). The villagers are jealous of each other, and the cousins end up spoiling each other. Most of the time, the villagers resort to black magic which is the only thing the villagers fear.

Murugan, a villager, decides to improve his fellow citizens' attitude. He then hears of an all-black magic performing village named Singapore in Kolli Hills. The people of this village sleep during the day and do black magic all night for the people coming from distant villages. There is a tree called "Musical Tree" in Singapore which stopped playing its music since a couple killed themselves inside the village. So, Singapore people do not allow outsiders to stay, except for married couples who are shunned by their families. So, Murugan takes his brother-in-law Saamy (disguised as a female) and moves into Singapore as a married couple. Saamy, being a street play actor, is very much used to playing female roles, thus fitting the bill perfectly.

In Singapore, to Murugan’s amusement, he finds wizards with special abilities such as floating in mid-air, buried in land, powerful in telekinesis, a wizard dead before a hundred years advising the people of the village only with his voice from the sky. After all these wizards, Murugan finally meets Sundhara Valli, who is the most powerful wizard of the village. Murugan falls in love at first sight with Valli. He thinks about marrying her and taking her to Pangaaliyur to change his people's jealousy. While Murugan tries to impress Valli, a intellectually disabled priest wrongly informs Valli that Murugan is actually Lord Murugan disguised as a normal human. Also, he has come here disguised in order to marry her. Friends of Valli persuade her in believing this, which eventually leads her to fall in love with Murugan.

People of Pangaaliyur learn of all this through Saamy. They cannot digest the fact that Murugan is in love with a wizard who is very beautiful and has 20 acres of land and 100 pounds of gold jewellery. In order to prevent their marriage, the people of Pangaaliyur kidnap Murugan and set him up to marry one of his in-laws. To prevent Murugan from escaping the marriage, they start a ceremonial Goddess Amman festival and tie holy rope on everyone's hand (a traditional rope, once tied on the hand the person with the rope should not leave the village until the festival ends). Everyone gets the rope tied, but Murugan escapes before his cousins tie the holy rope on his hand. Since everyone in the village is tied with the holy rope, they can never leave the village until the festival ends or is cancelled. Traditionally for a festival to be cancelled, a person from the village must die. In order to spoil the plan of Murugan, an elder from the village decides to let his life, saying that if a cousin is getting a better life, then the villager will give up his life to spoil it. As the old villager dies, everyone in the village is inspired and happy. They start from Pangaaliyur to spoil Murugan's plan with their newfound energy. Eventually, the musical tree plays its music once Murugan touches Valli, and the Singapore people accept their love. Murugan and Valli return to Pangaaliyur and eliminate the villagers' jealousy.

== Cast ==
- Karthikeyan Velu as Murugan
- Sanjana Burli as Sundhara Valli
- Kishore Dev as Saamy / Devasena
- Muhil as Karuna
- V.Sridhar
- Govinth Mayon
- Singaravelan
- Mettur Sekar
- Venkatesh babu
- Mu.Ka.Chinnannan
- Maragatham
- Sivaprakasam
- Niranjana
- Dhananya
- Mythili

== Soundtrack ==
Choo Mandhirakaali Album

Soundtrack album by Satish Raghunathan
- Released: 2021
- Recorded: 2021
- Genre: Soundtrack

The film's songs were composed by Satish Raghunathan and Background scoring was composed by Navip Murugan. The album consists of two lyrical tracks featuring lyrics penned by Gugai.Ma.Pugazhendhi.

Song title	Singers
"Kodaali Kannaala"	Anand Aravindakshan
"Dracula Chellakkutty"	Sean Roldan, Manasi Mahadevan

== Release ==
=== Critical reception ===
Choo Mandhirakaali generally opened to positive reviews. M Suganth from The Times of India gave 3/5 and calling it "a Quirky plot." Dinamalar rated the movie 2.5 out of 5 and stated that "Choo Mandhirakaali is complete entertainer". Nakkheeran stated that "Despite being a comedy film, there is an essential message to the community"
