= Anand Aravindakshan =

- Born: 19 November 1989 (age 36); Kerala, India
- Genres: Playback singing, Devotional songs
- Occupation: Singer
- Years active: 2007–present

Anand Aravindakshan (born 1989) is an Indian playback singer, and title winner of Airtel Super Singer 5, a television-based reality singing competition in Tamil televised on Vijay TV.

== Early life ==
Anand did his school education from Chennai, and while in high school at Sri Sankara Senior Secondary School in Chennai, Anand started representing his school at cultural events and competition. After his graduation in commerce at Vivekananda College in Chennai, Anand completed a course in sound engineering from Soundtech Media School of Sound Engineering and Recording in Chennai and his MBA from Symbiosis College in the same city.

== Television ==
Year	Name of Television Show	Role	Network
2024	Super Singer Season 10	Co-singer with contestant	Star Vijay

== Reality show experience ==
During this period Anand also took part in about four reality shows, where he won two shows and was announced first runner-up in the other two. He was the first runner up in the 2007 edition of Gandharva Sangeetham, a reality music show telecast by Kairali channel and in the 2008 edition of Athiradi Singer, a reality music show telecast by Sun TV. He was the title winner of the 2010 edition of Sa Re Ga Ma Pa challenge, a reality music show telecast by Zee Tamil. However, his latest reality show win in 2016 stirred up a lot of discussion and brought Anand to the limelight. This show was the fifth season of Airtel Super Singer, a television-based reality singing competition in Tamil televised on Vijay TV, and Anand was the title winner of this edition. With playback singers such as Srinivas, Unnikrishnan, Usha Uthup, and Mano judging the show, Anand was part of the top 30 contestants who were selected to participate in the various rounds. He was eliminated in the later rounds of the show but he made a comeback to the show as a wild card candidate. He was part of the top 5 in the grand finale. He was eventually announced the winner in the grand finale of the season, but this victory instantly fuelled controversial social media discussions questioning this decision, mentioning that Anand was already a playback singer. Anand later clarified his stand, and Vijay TV released a statement confirming that this rule of rejecting playback singers as candidates was not applicable for the fifth season since the rule was removed two years earlier for the Super Singer Senior category, they clarified that Anand's victory was valid.

== Concerts, jingles, and other recordings ==
In addition to being a playback singer, Anand has also performed on stage for concerts and live events. An Acapella piece that he released on YouTube in 2016 went viral, receiving more than 300 thousand views. In 2017, Anand released a YouTube dedication to Tamil singer Malaysia Vasudevan in 2017, which had almost 30,000 views. Another single released by him in 2016 on YouTube also had about 34000 views. Anand has also sung for some jingles, including a textile ad and New TVS Victor. Another album titled "Indha Kadhal Podhum" with Soundarya Bala Nandakumar, composed by Shravan – Jeshwanth, also gathered 48000 views on YouTube.

== Personal life ==
In December 2017, Anand married Paromita Banerjee, his high school sweetheart, in a Bengali-style wedding.

== Discography ==
Year	Film	Song name	Music composer	Language	Co-SIngers
2011	180	"Ninna Leni"	Sharreth	Telugu	K. S. Chithra and S. Sowmya
2012	Aarohanam	"Indha Vaan Veli"	K	Tamil	
2012	Thalsamayam Oru Penkutty	"Poovaname"	Sharreth	Malayalam	Alka Ajith
2012	Sundarapandian	"Kondaadum Manasu”	N R Raghunanthan	Tamil	
2012	Neerparavai	"Yaar Vettu”	N R Raghunanthan	Tamil	
2012	Krishna Aur Kans	"Shloka"	Sri Vedavyasa Ranga Bhattar	Hindi	Varaprasad J. V., Sam P. Keerthan, Pandit Ravi Shankar
2013	Annayum Rasoolum	"Vazhivakkil”	K	Malayalam	Swetha Mohan
2013	Annayum Rasoolum	"Yaaname"	K	Malayalam	
2013	Pandiya Naadu	"Verikonda Puli Ondru”	D. Imman	Tamil	
2013	Ivan Veramathiri	"Thanimayile”	C.Sathya	Tamil	Nivas
2013	Onbadhule Guru	"Theera Theera #2”	K	Tamil	Sean Roldan and Premji Amaren
2013	Madha Yaanai Koottam	"Kombu Oothi"	N. R. Raghunanthan	Tamil	Vikram Sugumaran and Pushpavanam Kuppusamy
2013	Palnadu	"Pagalatho Segalatho"	D. Imman	Telugu	Nivas
2013	Citizen	"Kadhalikale"	C. Sathya	Telugu	Nivas, C. Sathya
2014	Kaadu	"Ettu Thikkum"	K	Tamil	
2014	Mandya Star	"Ayyo Sumkena"	Manoj S	Kannada	
2015	10 Endrathukulla	"Gaana Gaana”	D. Imman	Tamil	Shreya Ghoshal
2015	Pasanga 2	"Tham Tham”	Arrol Corelli	Tamil	
2015	Kallappadam	"Vizhithidu"	K	Tamil	
2016	Kodi	"Sirukki Vaasam"	Santhosh Narayanan	Tamil	Shweta Mohan
2016	Dharma Yogi	"Puvvula Maasam"	Santhosh Narayanan	Telugu	Shweta Mohan
2016	Maas	"Theluyane Aase"	Anirudh Ravichander	Telugu	Anirudh Ravichander
2016	Thittivasal	"Moongil Poove"	German Vijay and Harish Satish	Tamil	Madhu Iyer
2017	Mom (Dubbed version)	"Poongaatre"	A. R. Rahman	Tamil	Priyanka NK
2017	Vajra	"Naa Iruva"	Monish Kumar	Kannada	Eesha Suchi
2018	Lakshmi	"Alaa Alaa"	Sam C S	Telugu	Swagatha S. Krishnan
2018	Boomerang	"Mughaiyazhi"	Radhan	Tamil	Radhika Narayanan
2018	Echckarikkai	"Kanne Kanmaniye"	K S Sundaramurthy	Tamil	
2021	Loner	"En Nizhalukkum"	Ady Kriz	Tamil	Music Video with Nalini Vittobane
2021	Paagal	"Kanapadava"	Leon James, Radhan	Telugu	
2021	Choo Mandhirakaali	"Kodaali Kannaala"	Satish Raghunathan	Tamil	M. M. Manasi
2023	Thudikkum Karangal	"Nee Yaaro"	Y Raghav Prasa	Tamil	Mridula Warrier
2024	Joe	"Urugi Urugi"	Siddhu Kumar	Tamil	
2024	Lucky Baskhar	"Kolladhey"	G.V. Prakash Kumar	Tamil	Shweta Mohan
2024	Kozhipannai Chelladurai	"Ponnana Pottapulla"	N. R. Raghunanthan	Tamil	Saindhavi
2024	Family Padam	"Nesama"	Anivee	Tamil	Svara Suresh
2025	Aaromaley	"Eppadi Vandhaayo"	Siddhu Kumar	Tamil	Chinmayi Sripada
2026	Aakasamlo Oka Tara (Malayalam)	"Kanne Kanne"	G. V. Prakash Kumar	Malayalam	Haritha Balakrishnan
