= Priyanka Deshpande =

Indian television presenter

- Born: Priyanka Deshpande; 28 April 1992 (age 34); Bengaluru, Karnataka, India
- Education: Ethiraj College for Women
- Occupation: Television presenter
- Years active: 2000–present
- Spouse(s): Praveen Kumar (m. 2016; div. 2022) Vasi Sachi (m. 2025)

Priyanka Deshpande (born 28 April 1992) is an Indian television presenter and actress who predominantly works in the Tamil television and film industry. Priyanka is also one of the highest-paid South Indian television presenters. She is well known for hosting numerous television shows such as Oo Solriya Oo Oohm Solriya, Super Singer Junior, Super Singer, The Wall, Start Music, OlliBelly, Suriya Vanakkam, Isai Unplugged, Azhagiya Penne, Glimpse, Jodi Number One, and Kings of Comedy Juniors. She has also appeared in a few short films, such as Raani Aattam (2015) and Unnodu Vaazhnthaal Varamallava (2016). Priyanka has also worked as a television host on various Indian television networks like Zee Tamil, Sun TV, Chutti TV, Sun Music, and Star Vijay. She is often referred to as Superstar of Television.

Her appearance as a television anchor in the singing reality show Super Singer earned her to bag the Ananda Vikatan Cinema Awards for the Best Female Anchor in 2016. She later also won the Best Female Anchor award in the Vijay Television Awards annual function in 2017. Priyanka also yet again won Best Lady Anchor for the third time in a row in the Galatta Nakshathra TV-Film Awards in 2018, winning the same nomination category for three years in a row. She also received the award Best Entertaining Star award by Blacksheep Digital Awards in 2021 after her success of her YouTube channel. In 2021, she joined the reality TV show Bigg Boss 5 hosted by Kamal Haasan as a contestant and finished as the runner up. She is the winner of Cooku with Comali season 5.

== Personal life ==
Priyanka Deshpande was born on 28 April 1992, in Karnataka. Her parents moved from Maharashtra to Karnataka before she was born. She has a younger brother, Rohit Deshpande. After Priyanka migrated to Chennai, she did her secondary schooling at St. Anthony School and later graduated from Ethiraj College for Women with a college degree. Priyanka married her long-term boyfriend, Praveen Kumar, in 2016.

In 2022, Priyanka and Praveen Kumar filed for divorce. She married DJ Vasi Sachi on 16 April 2025.

== Career ==
In 2019, Priyanka started her own show on Star Vijay called Start Music, which only featured her as the solo host after eight years. Priyanka also debuted as an actress in various different short films, like Raani Aattam directed by J. Dharmendra and Unnodu Vaazhnthaal Varamallava, where she was paired up with film actor Vignesh Karthick. She also went on to appear in various different television commercials for Amazon Prime and Aachi Masala. Priyanka also appeared in the music video So Soku with Pugazh, which was also trending on social media.

Priyanka also hosted the international reality show The Wall along with Ma Ka Pa Anand.

In 2021, Priyanka joined the reality show Bigg Boss as a contestant, which is hosted by actor Kamal Haasan, and finished as the first runner up. Apart from hosting TV shows, Priyanka also has a YouTube channel where she entertains people in virtual coverage, with her channel currently boasting 1.38 million subscribers.

=== Bigg Boss ===
After her participation on Bigg Boss and eventually emerging as the runner-up as well. She also participated as a guest on her formerly hosted show Start Music, which was hosted by Ma Ka Pa Anand due to the absence of Priyanka during her time in Bigg Boss. She also later made an appearance on the celebration and success show of Bigg Boss called Bigg Boss 5 Kondattam, appearing as a guest.

== Television ==
Key
†	Denotes Priyanka soon making an appearance

Name	Role	Network	Language	Notes
Kalakka Povathu Yaaru	Judge	Star Vijay	Tamil	
Super Singer Junior	Host	Star Vijay	Tamil	
Achcham Thavir	Contestant	Star Vijay	Tamil	
Jodi Number One Season 9	Host	Star Vijay	Tamil	
Smart Wheel	Guest	Astro Vinmeen HD	Tamil	
Super Singer 6	Host	Star Vijay	Tamil	
Super Singer 7	Host	Star Vijay	Tamil	
Super Singer 8	Host	Star Vijay	Tamil	
Super Singer 9	Host	Star Vijay	Tamil	
Start Music Season 1	Host	Star Vijay	Tamil	
Start Music Season 2	Host	Star Vijay	Tamil	
Bigg Boss (Tamil season 3)	Guest	Star Vijay	Tamil	
The Wall (Tamil game show)	Host	Star Vijay	Tamil	
Comedy Raja Kalakkal Rani	Host	Star Vijay	Tamil	
Bigg Boss (Tamil season 5)	Contestant	Star Vijay	Tamil	1st runner up
Bigg Boss 5 Kondattam	Guest	Star Vijay	Tamil	Celebration show
Super Singer Junior	Host	Star Vijay	Tamil	Season 8, replaced by Myna Nandhini
Bigg Boss Ultimate (season 1)	Guest	Disney+ Hotstar	Tamil	Finale week
Oo Solriya Oo Oohm Solriya	Host	Star Vijay	Tamil	
Bigg Boss (Tamil season 6)	Guest	Star Vijay	Tamil	
Super Singer 9	Host	Star Vijay	Tamil	
Start Music 4	Host	Star Vijay	Tamil	
Super Singer Junior 9	Host	Star Vijay	Tamil	
Super Singer Season 10	Host	Star Vijay	Tamil	
Cooku with Comali season 5	Contestant	Star Vijay	Tamil	Winner
Start Music 5	Host	Star Vijay	Tamil	
Bigg Boss (Tamil season 9)	Guest	Star Vijay	Tamil	
Happy Wife Happy Life	Host	Star Vijay	Tamil	

== Discography ==
=== Playback singer ===
Year	Film	Song	Co-singers	Notes
2019	Devarattam	"Madura Palapalakkudhu"	Nivas K. Prasanna, Vijay Sethupathi, Niranjana Ramanan	

== Awards and nominations ==
Priyanka Deshpande awards and nominations
Awards and nominations
Award	Wins	Nominations

Totals (Note: Certain award groups do not simply award one winner. They acknowledge several different recipients, have runners-up, and have third place. Since this is a specific recognition and is different from losing an award, runner-up mentions are considered wins in this award tally. For simplification and to avoid errors, each award in this list has been presumed to have had a prior nomination.)
- Wins: 9
- Nominations: 13

Year	Award	Category	Result	Show	Role
2017	Vijay Television Awards	Best Anchor Female	Won	Airtel Super Singer	Anchor
2021	Blacksheep Digital Awards	Best Entertaining Star	Won	For her YouTube Channel	Creator
2021	6th Annual Vijay Television Awards	Best Anchor Female	Won	Airtel Super Singer	Anchor
2021	Femina Super Daughter Award	Best Actress	Won		
2022	Radio City Women Entertainer Awards	Television Category	Won	Start Music season 2	Anchor
2022	7th Annual Vijay Television Awards	Best Anchor Female	Won	Airtel Super Singer	Anchor
2022	She Beauty Awards 2022	Women of the decade - Television	Won		Anchor
