= Bhavana Balakrishnan =

Indian sports journalist and television anchor

Bhavna Balakrishnan
- Born: Bhavna Balakrishnan; 12 June 1985 (age 41); Madras, Tamil Nadu, India
- Education: Great Lakes Institute of Management
- Occupations: anchor, commentator, play back singer, classical dancer, video jockey, radio jockey
- Known for: 2019 Cricket World Cup commentator
- Spouse: Nikhil Ramesh

Bhavana Balakrishnan (born 25 May 1985) is an Indian television anchor, cricket commentator, video jockey, playback singer and dancer. She is one of the most popular sports journalists in India after Mayanti Langer. She currently works as a broadcaster for Star Sports and has hosted several programmes for the channel. Balakrishnan was one of the women to commentate during the 2019 Cricket World Cup.

== Career ==
Balakrishnan began her career as a radio jockey for a brief period and ventured into television. She joined Raj TV as a host, and the first television show she hosted was Beach Girls Show. She later joined Star Vijay channel and became a full-time anchor with the channel in 2011. Her first programme with Vijay TV was Super Singer Junior, and she also hosted Airtel Super Singer until 2017. She has hosted other shows with the channel including the "Fun Unlimited" season of Jodi Number One.

In 2017, she joined Star Sports as a sports journalist and hosted broadcasts of for the Indian Premier League (IPL) and Pro Kabaddi League. She served as a commentator for Star Sports Tamil during the 2018 IPL season and was one of just two female presenters during the 2018 Indian Premier League. In 2019, she hosted the Tamil version of Indian celebrity talk show Famously Filmfare.

Balakrishnan made her debut as singer in 2018 and released her first single The MashUp Series by BB.

== Personal life ==
She married Mumbai based businessman Nikhil Ramesh and currently resides in Mumbai. Bhavana mostly does her hosting and presenting work in Tamil, while also being fluent in Hindi.
