= Ananth Vaidyanathan =

Indian voice expert (born 1957)

- Born: 1 November 1957 (age 68); Jamshedpur, Jharkhand, India
- Education: Loyola College, Chennai
- Occupations: voice expert, teacher, actor
- Known for: India's leading voice expert
- Website: www.ananthvaidyanathan.com

Ananth Vaidyanathan (born 1 November 1957) is an Indian singing trainer, who is popular for his appearances on reality singing television shows. He is often regarded as India's leading voice expert. He has also worked on few films as an actor and as a playback singer.

== Career ==
Ananth Vaidyanathan was born in Jamshedpur and began studying music from veterans T. M. Thiagarajan and Sangita Kalanidhi at the age of seven. He earned an MBA from XLRI - Xavier School of Management and also obtained his undergraduate degree in Economics from the Loyola College, Chennai. After completing his higher studies, he then joined the ITC Sangeet Research Academy, a musical academy in Kolkata at the age of 24. During his early career as a singing trainer, he labelled himself as a victim of wrong vocal techniques. He also confronted issues regarding the voice while training in Hindustani music while being professionally trained in classical music. In his early 20s, he also lost his speaking voice and was advised to sing slowly due to his vocal issues. Despite the odds, he became a professional voice expert in the 1990s and started conducting workshops across various parts of the country.

He began teaching music from 2003, giving voice lessons and training to contestants on various Indian TV reality shows from 2006. He also established a voice training academy Ananth Vaidyanathan Gurukulam in Coimbatore. During his television career as a voice expert, he has worked as a part of the Airtel Super Singer and Josco Indian Voice-Mazhavil Manorama shows, where he provides voice training to the contestants.

In 2010, he appeared as an actor in Bala's Tamil comedy drama film, Avan Ivan, where he portrayed a polygamist who was the father of the two lead characters, played by Vishal and Arya. In 2018, he took part as one of the sixteen contestants in the Tamil reality television show Bigg Boss hosted by Kamal Haasan. He was the second contestant to be eliminated from the show, departing on day 21. He also made a special appearance as a politician in the film LKG.

Ananth Vaidyanathan is also among the founding faculty of Artium Academy along with Sonu Nigam, KS Chithra and Aruna Sairam - a tech-led online music education platform established in 2021. He serves as Head of Faculty – Voice Science and Chief of Pedagogy, where he is responsible for training the teaching team and developing voice-science based pedagogy. Under his leadership, the academy’s faculty has trained thousands of students, and he has spearheaded the voice‑training and scientific curriculum development for live, one‑on‑one singing classes .

== Filmography ==
- Avan Ivan as Srikanth (2011)
- LKG as Avudaiyappan (2019)
