= Super Singer Junior season 2 =

Super Singer Junior
- Season 2

Release
- Original network: STAR Vijay
- Original release: 22 June 2009 – 17 June 2010

Season chronology
- Next → Season 3

The second season of Airtel Super Singer Junior - Thamizhagathin Chellakuralukkana Thedal (the search for the sweet voice of Tamil Nadu) premiered on 22 June 2009. The music competition reality TV show was again telecast on Vijay TV, and Bharti Airtel returned to sponsor this show. Episodes were telecast between Monday and Thursday each week at 9:00 pm. Children aged 6 years to 14 showcased their singing talent. The show initially promised that its winner would receive ₹25 lakhs (2.5 million Rupees) in prize money, which was later changed to a villa in Anugraha Satellite Town valued at ₹25 lakhs by its sponsor, Navashakthi Township and Developers.

Following playback singer Chinmayi's decision to stop hosting Vijay TV's Super Singer earlier in the year, various television anchors including Dhivyadarshini (DD), Sivakarthikeyan, Aishwarya Prabhakar, and Uma Padmanabhan hosted the show at various intervals, and playback singer Dhivyadarshini (DD) appeared regularly during the season as a replacement. Ananth Vaidyanathan returned as a voice trainer, and playback singer K. S. Chithra returned as a permanent judge of the show. Playback singers Mano, and Malgudi Subha also joined the show as permanent judges to replace Usha Uthup who quit the show.

A number of eminent playback singers and music directors appeared during the season as guest judges, including P. B. Sreenivas, P. Susheela, M. S. Viswanathan, S. Janaki, Sadhana Sargam, Nithyasree Mahadevan, Suchithra, Harish Raghavendra, Unni Menon, Madhu Balakrishnan, Sowmya, Pop Shalini, and Pushpavanam Kuppuswamy. Stars from the senior version of the show also appeared as judges during the season, including former contestants Naresh Iyer, Nikhil Mathew, and Ajeesh, and permanent judges P. Unnikrishnan, Anuradha Sriram and Srinivas. The winner Alka Ajith, was introduced as a playback singer in the 2011 Malayalam-language film The Train.

== Grand opening ==
The grand opening week was hosted by Malini and Yugendran. Former contestants from Airtel Super Singer 2008 and the debut season of Airtel Super Singer Junior participated in a week-long competition to promote and celebrate the opening of season 2 of the show.

No.	Title	Judges	Original release date
1	"Grand Opening – Part 1"	Anitha Kuppuswamy & Mahathi	22 June 2009
2	"Grand Opening – Part 2"	Anitha Kuppuswamy & Mahathi	23 June 2009
3	"Grand Opening – Part 3"	Anitha Kuppuswamy & Mahathi	24 June 2009
4	"Grand Opening – Part 4"	Anitha Kuppuswamy & Mahathi	25 June 2009

== Auditions ==
=== Open auditions ===
Open auditions for the season commenced in Coimbatore, Tamil Nadu, according to the then-official website of the show. Contestants in each round were either spot-selected, rejected, or wait-listed until the conclusion of that round. Each of these rounds were hosted by Divyadarshini.

No.	Title	Audition Judges	Original release date
5	"Coimbatore Auditions (preliminary round)"	Former contestants Anitha V., Nikhil Mathew, and Gautham	29 June 2009
Preliminary auditions were held in Coimbatore.
6	"Coimbatore Auditions (level 1)"	Deepan Chakravarthy, Anitha Kuppuswamy, and Mahathi	30 June 2009
7	"Coimbatore Auditions (level 1)"	Deepan Chakravarthy, Anitha Kuppuswamy, and Mahathi	1 July 2009
8	"Coimbatore Auditions (level 1)"	Deepan Chakravarthy, Anitha Kuppuswamy, and Mahathi	2 July 2009
A total of 21 contestants were selected for level 2 auditions in Chennai.
9	"Trichy Auditions (preliminary level)"	Former contestants Anitha V., Nikhil Mathew, and Maya	6 July 2009
Preliminary auditions were held in Trichy.
10	"Trichy Auditions (level 1)"	Manikka Vinayagam and Anitha Kuppuswamy	7 July 2009
11	"Trichy Auditions (level 1)"	Manikka Vinayagam and Anitha Kuppuswamy	8 July 2009
12	"Trichy Auditions (level 1)"	Manikka Vinayagam and Anitha Kuppuswamy	9 July 2009
A total of 19 contestants were selected for level 2 auditions in Chennai.
13	"Chennai Auditions (preliminary level)"	Charulatha Mani, Madhumitha, Dr. Lavanya, former contestants Anitha V., Nikhil Mathew, and Gautham	13 July 2009
14	"Chennai Auditions (preliminary level)"	Charulatha Mani, Madhumitha, Dr. Lavanya, former contestants Anitha V., Nikhil Mathew, and Gautham	14 July 2009
Preliminary auditions were held in Chennai.
15	"Chennai Auditions (level 1 – part A)"	Sunitha Sarathy, Tippu, and Shalini	15 July 2009
16	"Chennai Auditions (level 1 – part A)"	Sunitha Sarathy, Tippu, and Shalini	16 July 2009
17	"Chennai Auditions (level 1 – part B)"	Tippu, Shalini, and Mahathi	20 July 2009
18	"Chennai Auditions (level 1 – part B)"	Tippu, Shalini, and Mahathi	21 July 2009
19	"Chennai Auditions (level 1 – part B)"	Tippu, Shalini, and Mahathi	22 July 2009
20	"Chennai Auditions (level 1 – part B)"	Tippu, Shalini, and Mahathi	23 July 2009
A total of 57 contestants were selected for level 2 auditions.
21	"Trichy-Coimbatore Auditions (level 2)"	Unni Menon, Shalini, and Mahathi	27 July 2009
22	"Trichy-Coimbatore Auditions (level 2)"	Unni Menon, Shalini, and Mahathi	28 July 2009
23	"Trichy-Coimbatore Auditions (level 2)"	Unni Menon, Shalini, and Mahathi	29 July 2009
Level 2 auditions were held in Chennai for the 40 contestants selected in Coimbatore and Trichy. The contestants were required to sing a slow or melody-genre based song and a fast song. A total of 25 contestants were selected to advance to main auditions.
24	"Chennai Auditions (level 2)"	Unni Menon, Shalini, and Mahathi	3 August 2009
25	"Chennai Auditions (level 2)"	Unni Menon, Shalini, and Mahathi	4 August 2009
26	"Chennai Auditions (level 2)"	Unni Menon, Shalini, and Mahathi	5 August 2009
27	"Chennai Auditions (level 2)"	Unni Menon, Shalini, and Mahathi	6 August 2009
Level 2 auditions were held in Chennai for the 57 contestants selected in level 1 Chennai auditions. The contestants were required to sing a slow or melody-genre based song and a fast song. A total of 45 contestants were selected to advance to main level auditions.

== Contestants ==
- Alka Ajith – known in the competition as Alka, she is from Kerala. She had a repertoire of 200 songs at the start of the competition. Alka placed into the grand finale by the permanent judges and was named the winner of the competition.
- Shravan R. Pratap – known in the competition as Shravan, he was born to a family from Kerala. He was learning Carnatic music from Padma Chandilyan (wife of mridangamist Srimushnam V. Raja Rao) and had performed Carnatic music concerts before entering the competition. Shravan was placed into the grand finale by the permanent judges and was named runner-up, winning a car. He subsequently competed in spin-off versions of the show and other Vijay TV music competitions.
- Nithyashree Venkataraman – known in the competition as Nithyashree, she entered the competition at age 9. She was eliminated as a semi-finalist but immediately qualified as a wild-card contestant and re-entered the competition by popular vote and a decision of the permanent judges. Nithyashree ultimately tied for fourth place with Roshan. Shortly after the finale, she was selected to host special post-final episodes of the show. In subsequent seasons she appeared as a guest performer and backing vocalist, and competed in other Vijay TV music competitions; she won Kedi Boys Killadi Girls, was on the winning team of the first two seasons of Super Singer T20, and finished as runner-up of the second season of Indian Idol Junior.
- Roshan – was born to a family hailing from Kerala. He was placed into the grand finale by the permanent judges, and tied for fourth-place. He subsequently competed in spin-off versions of the show and other Vijay TV music competitions. His younger brother Robin has appeared as a contestant in Sun Singer broadcast by Sun TV and in season 1 of Airtel Super Singer Junior in 2007.
- Srikanth – was the youngest finalist of the season. He was initially eliminated but returned as a wildcard contestant, and the permanent judges made an exception to allow him to re-enter the competition as he appeared to be popular at the time. Srikanth was given the title "Most Popular Contestant" of the season, and finished in third place. He subsequently appeared as a competitor on Airtel Super Singer T20.
- Srinisha Jayaseelan – Eliminated from the competition as a semi-finalist. She later appeared as a guest performer and backing vocalist in subsequent seasons of the show, and competed in other Vijay TV music competitions. She was on the winning team of the second season of Super Singer T20.
- Priyanka NK – Initially eliminated from the competition as a quarter-finalist, she qualified as a wild-card contestant; viewers protested the judges' decision to eliminate her again before the finale. Nevertheless, Priyanka was recognised at the finale. She later appeared as a guest performer and backing vocalist in subsequent seasons of the show, and competed in other Vijay TV music competitions. Priyanka later went on to become a playback singer, winning the Vijay TV Best Female Singer award and Mirchi Music award. She has sung in movies for Illayaraja, AR Rahman, D Imman, G.V. Prakash and other music directors too.
- Shrihari – He appeared as a contestant during season 1 of the show. In season two he was eliminated from the top 11. Although he qualified as a wild-card contestant, he was eliminated again before the finale.
- Prasanna Sundar – was eliminated from the top 7 finalists.
- Sharath Rajagopalan – known as Sharath during the competition, he was eliminated from the top 9 finalists.
- Sahana – She received training in Carnatic music prior to entering the competition. She was eliminated from the top 10 finalists.
- Balasarangan – eliminated from the top 12 finalists.
- Ovviya – previously appeared on Jaya TV's Ragamalika series. Ovviya was eliminated from the top 13 finalists.
- Vishnucharan – was eliminated from the top 14 finalists.
- Sowmya – eliminated from the top 8 finalists. She won the best western singer award of the season, giving an outstanding performance of Mayya Maya. She later appeared on other Vijay TV music competitions.
- Sivaranjani – eliminated from the top 19 contestants.
- Sanjana – She was eliminated from the top 20 finalists.

=== Top 25 contestant IDs ===
The top 25 contestants were selected from the final round of auditions.

- Monisha
- Alka Ajith
- Balasarangan
- Sahana
- Manisha
- Prasanna Sundar
- Sowmya
- Oviya
- Vishnucharan
- Sivaranjani
- Nithyashree
- Harish
- Shri Prasanna
- Sanjana
- Shravan
- Srinisha Jayaseelan
- Shrihari
- Sharath
- Roshan
- Srikanth
- Priyanka
- Soundarya
- Sathyanarayanan
- Srinidhi
- Ponmozhi

== Main competition ==
The main competition comprised a series of performance rounds on successive weeks, from 23 September 2009 to 27 May 2010, with occasional break weeks. Typically each round had four episodes telecast Monday to Thursday, with a contestant eliminated at the end of the last show that week.

=== Freestyle round ===
- Compere: Divya
- Permanent Judges: Malgudi Subha, Mano, and K. S. Chithra
- Performances:

This round required the top 25 contestants to perform a song of their choice.

Air date	Order	Non-contestant performer	Contestant	Song	Original artist	Lyricist	Music director	Movie (year)
23 September 2009	1		SSJ23 Sri Prasanna	"Vathikuchi Pathikadhuda"	S. P. Balasubrahmanyam	Vaali	Yuvan Shankar Raja	Dheena (2001)
23 September 2009	2		SSJ14 Sanjana	"Oho Megam Vandhadho"	S. Janaki	Vaali	Ilaiyaraaja	Mouna Ragam (1986)
23 September 2009	3		SSJ15 Shravan	"Varaha Nadhikarai"	Shankar Mahadevan	Vairamuthu	A. R. Rahman	Sangamam (1999)
23 September 2009	4		SSJ16 Srinisha	"Chittu Kuruvi"	P. Susheela	Kannadasan	Viswanathan–Ramamoorthy	Puthiya Paravai (1999)
23 September 2009	5		SSJ17 Shrihari	"Unakenna Mele"	S. P. Balasubrahmanyam	Kannadasan	M. S. Viswanathan	Simla Special (1999)
23 September 2009	6		SSJ18 Sharath Rajagopalan	"Ennadi Meenakshi"	S. P. Balasubrahmanyam	Vaali	Ilaiyaraaja	Ilamai Oonjal Aadukirathu (1978)

=== Navarathiri special ===
- Compere: Divya
- Permanent judges: K. S. Chithra, Malgudi Subha, and Mano
- Performances:

The top 25 contestants were required to provide duet or trio performances in celebration of the Hindu festival Navarathri.

For the episodes telecast on 29 and 30 September, musical performances were of a South Indian theme. Unlike usual weeks, the contestants and guest performers sat on seats at one side of the stage so that the Bharatha Natyam students who were dancing to the song took centre stage.

In the episode telecast on 1 October, the art of dandiya dance was taught to contestants by Mansi Bhat who together with the judges and host danced on stage before the commencement of music performances. Musical performances were of a North Indian theme.

– Non-competition performance

Air date	Order	Non-contestant performer(s)	Contestant 1	Contestant 2	Song	Original artist	Lyricist	Music director	Movie (year)
29 September 2009
29 September 2009	1								
29 September 2009	2		SSJ04 Sahana	SSJ21 Priyanka	"Sri Ranga Ranganathanin"	S. P. Balasubrahmanyam; Uma Ramanan; Shobana Vignesh	Vaali	Ilaiyaraaja	Mahanadi (1994)
29 September 2009	3	Shweta Mohan			"Alai Payudhe"		Oothukkadu Venkata Kavi	Traditional Carnatic music composition	
29 September 2009	4		SSJ14 Sanjana	SSJ15 Shravan	"Kurai Ondrum Illai"	M. S. Subbulakshmi	Vaali	Traditional Carnatic music composition	Kaadhalan (1994)
29 September 2009	5		SSJ17 Srihari	SSJ23 Sathyanarayanan	"Om Sivoham"	Vijay Prakash	Vaali	Ilaiyaraaja	Naan Kadavul (2009)
29 September 2009	6	K. S. Chithra, Mano & Malgudi Shubha	SSJ17 Srihari	SSJ23 Sathyanarayanan	"Janani Janani"	Ilaiyaraaja, Deepan Chakravarthy & Krishnachandran		Ilaiyaraaja	Thai Moogambikai (1982)
30 September 2009	1		SSJ03 Balasarangan	SSJ09 Vishnuharan	"Amma Endru"	K. J. Yesudas	Vaali	Ilaiyaraaja	Mannan (1992)
30 September 2009	2	SSJ05 Manisha	SSJ24 Srinidhi	SSJ10 Sivaranjani	"Kaatril Varum"	Hariharan (singer), Sadhana Sargam, Shreya Ghoshal	Vaali	Ilaiyaraaja	Oru Naal Oru Kanavu (1981)
30 September 2009	3		SSJ07 Sowmya	SSJ25 Ponmozhi	"Mukundha Mukundha"	Sadhana Sargam & Kamal Haasan	Vaali	A. R. Rahman	Dasavathaaram (2008)
30 September 2009	4		SSJ02 Alka Ajith	SSJ19 Roshan	"Kalabham Tharaam"	K. S. Chithra	Gireesh Puthenchery	Raveendran	Vadakkumnathan (Malayalam language 2006)
1 October 2009	1		SSJ01 Monisha	SSJ18 Sharath	Medley of 3 songs ("Dil Mera")	Mathangi Jagdish & Srinivas;	Vairamuthu	Ramesh Vinayakam;	Azhagiya Theeye (2004);
1 October 2009	2								
1 October 2009	3		SSJ08 Oviya	SSJ25 Sathyanarayanan	"Thandiya"	Unni Menon, M. G. Sreekumar & Kavita Krishnamurthy	Vaali	A. R. Rahman	Kadhalir Dhinam (1999)
1 October 2009	4		SSJ16 Srinisha	SSJ22 Soundarya	"Raadhai Manadhil"	K. S. Chithra, Sujatha Mohan & Sangeetha Sajith	Vairamuthu	Vidyasagar	Snegithiye (2000)

=== Koothu songs ===
- Compere: Divya
- Permanent judges: K. S. Chithra, Mano and Malgudi Subha
- Special guest judge and voice trainer for the week: Manikka Vinayagam
- Performances:

The 5–8 October round required the 25 contestants to perform songs of a koothu style. Those selected in the top five were safe from elimination. At the conclusion of the performances, the judges eliminated a contestant from the competition.

– Non-competition performance
– Contestant spot-selected into top-five zone with immunity this week
– Contestant was in the bottom three
– Contestant was eliminated

Air date	Order	Non-contestant performer	Contestant	Song	Original artist	Lyricist	Music director	Movie (year)
5 October 2009
5 October 2009	1	Manikka Vinayagam		Excerpt from Kootthu Song				
5 October 2009	2		SSJ25 Ponmozhi	"Machan Meesai"	Pushpa Anand	Pa. Vijay	Vidyasagar	Dhill (2001)
5 October 2009	2		SSJ18 Sharath	"Ah Mudhal Akku"	Shankar Mahadevan		Srikanth Deva	Jithan (2005)
5 October 2009	3		SSJ16 Srinisha	"Vechukkava"	KK & Srilekha Parthasarathy		Srikanth Deva	M. Kumaran S/O Mahalakshmi (2004)
5 October 2009	4		SSJ03 Balasarangan	"Aruvaa Meesai"	Manikka Vinayagam & Vidhu Prabhakar		Vidyasagar	Dhool (2003)
5 October 2009	5		SSJ24 Shrinidhi	"Kumbida Pona Deivam"	Shankar Mahadevan & Malathy Lakshman	Perarasu	Dhina	Thirupaachi (2005)
5 October 2009	6		SSJ19 Roshan	"Annaaththe Aaduraar"	S. P. Balasubrahmanyam	Vaali	Ilaiyaraaja	Apoorva Sagodharargal (1989)
6 October 2009	1		SSJ01 Monisha	"Appadi Podu"	KK. & Anuradha Sriram	Kapilan	Vidyasagar	Ghilli (2004)
6 October 2009	2		SSJ06 Prasanna Sundar	"Kallakuven"	Silambarasan & Shankar Mahadevan	Thamarai	Deva & Sabesh–Murali	Dum (2003)
6 October 2009	3		SSJ09 Vishnucharan	"Thirupathi Vantha"	Shankar Mahadevan		Bharadwaj	Thirupathi (2006)
6 October 2009	4		SSJ08 Oviya	"Pandian Naanirukka"	L. R. Eswari & S. C. Krishnan	Kannadasan	K. V. Mahadevan	Thillana Mohanambal (1968)
6 October 2009	5		SSJ13 Shri Prasanna	"Kattabomma Oorenakku"	Vijay Yesudas	Na. Muthukumar	Yuvan Shankar Raja	Thaamirabharani (2006)
6 October 2009	6		SSJ21 Priyanka	"Ketala Ange"			Ilaiyaraaja	Bhadrakali (1976)
6 October 2009	7		SSJ14 Sanjana	"Manmadha Rasa"	Shankar Mahadevan & Malathy Lakshman	Yugabharathi	Dhina	Thiruda Thirudi (1976)
7 October 2009			SSJ04 Sahana	"Aasai Dosai"	Priya Subramaniam	Na. Muthukumar	Vidyasagar	Paramasivan (2006)
7 October 2009			SSJ20 Shrikanth	"Namma Singaari Sarakku"	S. P. Balasubrahmanyam	Vaali	Ilaiyaraaja	Kaakki Sattai (1985)
7 October 2009			SSJ22 Soundharya	"Kitta Neringivaadi"	Gayathri & Sukhwinder Singh	Vairamuthu	Vijay Antony	Dishyum (2006)
7 October 2009			SSJ05 Manisha					
8 October 2009
8 October 2009	1		SSJ23 Sathyanarayanan	"Machan Peru"	Shankar Mahadevan	Kapilan	Vidyasagar	Madhurey (2004)
8 October 2009	2		SSJ11 Nithyashree	"Seena Thana (Siruchi)"	Grace	Vairamuthu	Bharadwaj	Vasool Raja MBBS (2004)
8 October 2009	3	Malgudi Shubha		Excerpt from "Seena Thana (Siruchi)"	Grace	Vairamuthu	Bharadwaj	Vasool Raja MBBS (2004)
8 October 2009	4		SSJ02 Alka Ajith	"Sarakku Vachirukken"	Shankar Mahadevan & Radhika Tilak	Vairamuthu	Mani Sharma	Shahjahan (2001)
8 October 2009	5		SSJ10 Sivaranjani	"Mambazhamam Mambazham"	Shankar Mahadevan & Ganga	Snehan	Mani Sharma	Pokkiri (2007)
8 October 2009	6		SSJ15 Shravan	"Saroja Saman Nikalo"	Shankar Mahadevan & Premji Amaran	Gangai Amaran	Premji Amaran & Yuvan Shankar Raja	Chennai 600028 (2007)
8 October 2009	7		SSJ05 Manisha					

=== Deepavali special ===
- Compere: Divyadarshini and Priyadarshini
- Guest judges: Anuradha Sriram and Srinivas
- Performances:

There was no elimination in this show on 14 October.

=== Melody round ===
- Compere: Divya
- Permanent voice trainer: Ananth Vaidyanathan
- Permanent judges: K. S. Chithra, Mano and Malgudi Subha
- Contestants trained by former Super Singer winners: Nikhil Mathew and Ajeesh
- Performances:

The 19–22 October round required the 24 remaining contestants to perform melody-based songs. The 22 October episode featured compositions of A. R. Rahman. The top-five performers were safe from elimination. At the conclusion of the performances, the judges eliminated a contestant.

– Non-competition performance
– Contestant spot-selected into top five with immunity this week (Shravan, Priyanka, Srikanth)
– Contestant was in the bottom five (Sathyanarayanan, Ponmozhi, Sanjana, Harish and Sivaranjani)
– Contestant was eliminated

Air date	Order	Non-contestant performer	Contestant	Song	Original artist	Lyricist	Music director	Movie (year)
22 October 2009
22 October 2009	1		SSJ01 Alka Ajith	"Kannalanae"	K. S. Chithra, A. R. Rahman & Chorus	Vairamuthu	A. R. Rahman	Bombay (1995)
22 October 2009	2		SSJ13 Sri Prasanna	"Uyirum Neeye"	P. Unnikrishnan	Vairamuthu	A. R. Rahman	Pavithra (1994)
22 October 2009	3	Ajeesh		Excerpt from "Uyirum Neeye"	P. Unnikrishnan	Vairamuthu	A. R. Rahman	Pavithra (1994)
22 October 2009	4		SSJ07 Sowmya	"Kannathil Muthamittal"	Chinmayi & P. Jayachandran	Vairamuthu	A. R. Rahman	Kannathil Muthamittal (1994)
22 October 2009	5		SSJ19 Roshan	"Anjali Anjali"	S. P. Balasubrahmanyam & K. S. Chithra	Vairamuthu	A. R. Rahman	Duet (1994)
22 October 2009	6	Nikhil Mathew, Ajeesh & Mano		Excerpt from "Thendralae Thendralae"	Mano & P. Unnikrishnan	Vairamuthu	A. R. Rahman	Kadhal Desam (1994)
22 October 2009	7		SSJ03 Balasarangan	"Roja Roja"	P. Unnikrishnan	Vaali	A. R. Rahman	Kadhalir Dhinam (1999)
22 October 2009	8		SSJ23 Sathyanarayanan					

=== Rain songs ===
- Compere: Divya
- Permanent judges: K. S. Chithra and Mano
- Contestants trained by former Super Singer winners: Nikhil Mathew and Ajeesh
- Performances:

The 26–29 October round required the 23 remaining contestants to perform songs which fit the theme of rain.

– Non-competition performance
– Contestant spot-selected into top 5 with immunity this week
– Contestant was in the bottom three
– Contestant was eliminated

Air date	Order	Non-contestant performer	Contestant	Song	Original artist	Lyricist	Music director	Movie (year)
28 October 2009
28 October 2009	1	Mano, Nikhil Mathew & Ajeesh		Excerpt from "Chandrodayam Oru"	T. M. Sounderarajan	Vaali	M. S. Viswanathan	Chandhrodhayam (1966)
28 October 2009	2		SSJ21 Priyanka	"Vaan Maegam Poo Poovaai"	K. S. Chithra	Vairamuthu	Ilaiyaraaja	Punnagai Mannan (2000)
28 October 2009	3	K. S. Chithra		Excerpt from "Vaan Maegam Poo Poovaai"	K. S. Chithra	Vairamuthu	Ilaiyaraaja	Punnagai Mannan (2000)
28 October 2009	4		SSJ06 Prasanna Sundar	"Chinna Chinna Thooral"	S. P. Balasubrahmanyam	Vaali	Ilaiyaraaja	Senthamizh Pattu (1992)
28 October 2009	5		SSJ24 Shrinidhi	"Megham Thiruluthadi"	S. Janaki & M. S. Viswanathan	Kannadasan	M. S. Viswanathan	Thanneer Thanneer (1981)
28 October 2009	6		SSJ15 Shravan	"Mazhai Varuthu"	K. J. Yesudas	Vaali	Ilaiyaraaja	Raja Kaiya Vacha (1990)
28 October 2009	7		SSJ25 Ponmozhi	"Thaen Sindhudhe Vaanam"	S. P. Balasubrahmanyam & S. Janaki	Kannadasan	G. K. Venkatesh	Ponnukku Thanga Manasu (1990)
28 October 2009	8		SSJ11 Nithyashree	"Venmegham"	Shreya Ghoshal & Uday Mazumdar	Vairamuthu	A. R. Rahman	Guru (2007)

=== Non-Tamil songs ===
- Compere: Divya
- Permanent judges: K. S. Chithra, Mano and Malgudi Subha
- Contestants trained by former Super Singer winners: Nikhil Mathew and Ajeesh
- Performances:

The 2–5 November round had the theme of Pira Mozhi Paadalgal (English: other language songs). The 22 remaining contestants were required to perform songs which were in a language other than Tamil. At the conclusion of the week, a contestant was eliminated.

– Non-competition performance
– Contestant spot-selected to advance to next round with immunity (Sharath [1])
– Contestant was in the bottom four
– Contestant was eliminated

Air date	Order	Non-contestant performer	Contestant(s)	Song	Language	Original artist	Lyricist	Music composer/director	Source/Movie (year)
3 November 2009
3 November 2009	1	K. S. Chithra		"Mayangi Poy"	Malayalam	K. S. Chithra	Kaithapram	M. Jayachandran	Nottam (2006)
3 November 2009	2		SSJ02 Alka Ajith	"Kabhi Neki Bhi"	Urdu	Asha Bhosle & Mirza Ghalib		Jaidev	
3 November 2009	3		SSJ12 Harish	"Confusion Theerkaname"	Malayalam	M. G. Sreekumar	Gireesh Puthenchery	Vidyasagar	Summer in Bethlehem (1998)
3 November 2009	4		SSJ04 Sahana	"Mere Naina Sawan Bhadon"	Hindi	Lata Mangeshkar	Anand Bakshi	Rahul Dev Burman	Summer in Bethlehem (1998)
3 November 2009	5		SSJ14 Sanjana	"Mann Mohana"	Hindi	Bela Shende	Javed Akhtar	A. R. Rahman	Jodhaa Akbar (2008)
3 November 2009	6		SSJ06 Prasanna Sundar	"Naadha Roopini Shankari"	Malayalam	M. G. Sreekumar	Kaithapram	Raveendran	His Highness Abdullah (1971)
3 November 2009	7		SSJ10 Sivaranjani	"Tere Meri Beech"	Hindi	S. P. Balasubrahmanyam	Anand Bakshi	Laxmikant–Pyarelal	Ek Duuje Ke Liye (1981)
4 November 2009
4 November 2009	1	Malgudi Shubha		"Kalla Chandamama"	Kannada	Malgudi Subha	V. Nagendra Prasad	Gurukiran	Khushi (2003)
4 November 2009	2		SSJ01 Monisha	"Ho Laal Meri Pat Rakhiyo"	Hindi	Runa Laila		Nisar Bazmi	The Loves Of Runa Laila (1985 album)
4 November 2009	3		SSJ20 Srikanth	"Omkaara Naadaanusandhanam"	Telugu	S. P. Balasubrahmanyam & S. Janaki	Veturi	K. V. Mahadevan	Sankarabharanam (1998)
4 November 2009	4		SSJ16 Srinisha	"Dum Maro Dum"	Hindi	Asha Bhosle	Anand Bakshi	Rahul Dev Burman	Hare Rama Hare Krishna (1967)
4 November 2009	5	Divya, Malgudi Shubha, Mano, K. S. Chithra	All contestants	Excerpt from "Dum Maro Dum"	Hindi	Asha Bhosle	Anand Bakshi	Rahul Dev Burman	Hare Rama Hare Krishna (1971)
4 November 2009	6		SSJ13 Shri Prasanna	"Jab Deep Jale Aana, Jab Shaam Dhale Aana"	Hindi	K. J. Yesudas & Hemlata	Ravindra Jain	Ravindra Jain	Chitchor (1976)
4 November 2009	7		SSJ03 Balasarangan	"Ramakadha"	Malayalam	K. J. Yesudas	Kaithapram	Raveendran	Bharatham (1991)
4 November 2009	8		SSJ19 Roshan	"Mitwa"	Hindi	Shafqat Amanat Ali, Caralisa Monteiro & Shankar Mahadevan	Javed Akhtar	Shankar–Ehsaan–Loy	Kabhi Alvida Naa Kehna (2006)
5 November 2009
5 November 2009	1	Divya		"Chura Liya Hai Tumne"	Hindi	Shaan & Alka Yagnik		Himesh Reshamiya	Chura Liyaa Hai Tumne (2003)
5 November 2009	2		SSJ08 Ovviya	"Melee Melee"	Arabic				
5 November 2009	3		SSJ09 Vishnucharan	"Bahut Pyar Karte Hain"	Hindi	S. P. Balasubrahmanyam	Sameer	Nadeem-Shravan	Saajan (1992)
5 November 2009	4		SSJ21 Priyanka	"Bole Re Pappihara"	Hindi	Vani Jairam	Gulzar	Vasant Desai	Guddi (1971)
5 November 2009	5		SSJ17 Shrihari	"Pramadavanam Veendum"	Malayalam	K. J. Yesudas	Kaithapram	Raveendran	His Highness Abdullah (1971)
5 November 2009	6		SSJ22 Soundharya	"Raina Beeti Jaye"	Hindi	Lata Mangeshkar & Rajesh Khanna	Anand Bakshi	R.D.Burman	Amar Prem (1972)
5 November 2009	7		SSJ12 Harish						

=== Pleasant melody songs ===
- Compere: Divya
- Permanent judges: Mano (9–11 November episodes only), K. S. Chithra and Malgudi Subha
- Special guest judge: Jency
- Guest trainers (former Super Singer winners): Nikhil Mathew and Ajeesh
- Performances:

The 9–12 November round required the 21 remaining contestants to perform Raajaavin Ramyamaana Raagangal (English: Ilaiyaraaja's pleasant melody songs) from movies released in the 1970s and 1980s. The 10 November episode celebrated the 44th birthday of judge Mano, with his family appearing on the show.

– Non-competition performance
– Contestant spot-selected to advance to next round with immunity (Sowmya)
– Contestant was in the bottom two
– Contestant was eliminated

Air date	Order	Non-contestant performer	Contestant	Song	Original artist	Lyricist	Music composer/director	Source/Movie (year)
10 November 2009
10 November 2009	1	Mano		"Panivilum Malarvanam"	S. P. Balasubrahmanyam	Vairamuthu	Ilaiyaraaja	Ninaivellam Nithya (1982)
10 November 2009	2		SSJ11 Nithyashree	"Indha Poovil"	S. Janaki	Panchu Arunachalam	Ilaiyaraaja	Murattu Kaalai (1980)
10 November 2009	3		SSJ17 Shrihari	"Azhagae Azhagu"	K. J. Yesudas	Kannadasan	Ilaiyaraaja	Raja Paarvai (1979)
10 November 2009	4		SSJ24 Shrinidhi	"Yennulil Yengo"	Vani Jairam	Gangai Amaran	Ilaiyaraaja	Rosapoo Ravikaikari (1979)
10 November 2009	5	Jency		Excerpt from "Iru Paravaigal"	Jency	Gangai Amaran	Ilaiyaraaja	Niram Maaratha Pookkal (1979)
10 November 2009	6		SSJ10 Sivaranjani	"Iru Paravaigal"	Jency	Gangai Amaran	Ilaiyaraaja	Niram Maaratha Pookkal (1979)
10 November 2009	7		SSJ08 Oviya	"Endhan Kannil"	S. Janaki	Kannadasan	Ilaiyaraaja	Guru (1980)
11 November 2009
11 November 2009	1	Jency		Medley consisting of excerpts from "Dheiveega Raagam", "Aathoram Kaathaada" & "Kaadhal Oviyam"	Jency; Jency & Vani Jairam; Ilaiyaraaja & Jency	Panchu Arunachalam; Panchu Arunachalam & Vairamuthu	Ilaiyaraaja	Ullasa Paravaigal (1980); Enkeyo Ketta Kural (1982) & Alaigal Oivathillai (1981)
11 November 2009	2		SSJ01 Monisha	"En Vaanilae"	Jency	Kannadasan	Ilaiyaraaja	Johnny (1980)
11 November 2009	3	Mano & Sadhanandham (guitar)		Excerpt from "Yen Iniya Pon Nilaave"	K. J. Yesudas	Gangai Amaran	Ilaiyaraaja	Moodu Pani (1982)
11 November 2009	4		SSJ18 Sharath Rajagopalan	"Yen Iniya Pon Nilaave"	K. J. Yesudas	Gangai Amaran	Ilaiyaraaja	Moodu Pani (1982)
11 November 2009	5		SSJ13 Shri Prasanna	"Ilaya Nila"	S. P. Balasubrahmanyam	Vairamuthu	Ilaiyaraaja	Payanangal Mudivathillai (1982)
11 November 2009	6		SSJ03 Balasarangan	"Idhu Oru Ponmaalai Pozhuthu"	S. P. Balasubrahmanyam	Vairamuthu	Ilaiyaraaja	Nizhalgal (1980)
11 November 2009	7		SSJ21 Priyanka	"Azhagiya Kanne"	S. Janaki	Kannadasan	Ilaiyaraaja	Uthiripookkal (1979)
12 November 2009	1		SSJ20 Shrikanth	"Chinna Pura"	S. P. Sailaja & S. P. Balasubrahmanyam	Vaali	Ilaiyaraaja	Anbe Sangeetha (1979)
12 November 2009	2		SSJ02 Alka Ajith	"Senthoora Poove"	S. Janaki	Gangai Amaran	Ilaiyaraaja	16 Vayathinile (1977)
12 November 2009	3		SSJ04 Sahana	"Aasaiya Kathula"	S. P. Sailaja	Gangai Amaran	Ilaiyaraaja	Johnny (1980)
12 November 2009	4		SSJ19 Roshan	"Poove Sempoove"	K. J. Yesudas	Vaali	Ilaiyaraaja	Solla Thudikuthu Manasu (1988)
12 November 2009	5		SSJ16 Srinisha	"Puttham Pudhu Kaalai"	S. Janaki	Gangai Amaran	Ilaiyaraaja	Alaigal Oivathillai (1981)
12 November 2009	6		SSJ14 Sanjana	"Azhagu Aayiram"	S. Janaki	Panchu Arunachalam	Ilaiyaraaja	Ullasa Paravaigal (1980)
12 November 2009	7		SSJ24 Shrinidhi					

=== Boys vs girls round ===
- Compere: Divyadarshini and Deepak
- Permanent voice trainer: Ananth Vaidyanathan
- Permanent judges: K. S. Chithra, Mano and Malgudi Subha
- Performances:

The 16–19 November round divided the 20 remaining contestants into a team of males and another of females. Voice trainer Ananth Vaidyanathan, who trained contestants in the latter rounds of the previous season, began training this season's contestants. He requested the judges to not eliminate any contestants this week, and the judges agreed.

=== Mottukalin Mettukal round ===
- Compere: Divya
- Permanent voice trainer: Ananth Vaidyanathan
- Permanent judges: Mano and K. S. Chithra
- Performances:

The 23–25 November episodes featured a Mottukalin Mettukal round for the remaining 20 contestants. At the end of this week's performance, Sanjana was eliminated from the competition.

=== Carnatic classical round ===
- Compere: Divya
- Permanent voice trainer: Ananth Vaidyanathan
- Special guest judges: Nithyasree Mahadevan and P. Unnikrishnan
- Performances:

The 30 November – 2 December round celebrated the Hindu festival Karthigai Deepam, and required the 19 remaining contestants to sing film songs which fit in the Carnatic music ("classical") genre.

Carnatic music advocate and playback singer Nithyasree Mahadevan made her first appearance on the show as a special guest judge for this round. The special guest judges granted four contestants immunity from this week's elimination. Students receiving formal training in Bharatha Natyam danced while each contestant performed.

At the conclusion of this week's performances, the special guest judges decided to waitlist the bottom five contestants and would not eliminate any contestant based on their performances. Consequently, the bottom five contestants were required to perform in a "waitlist challenge" the following week, at which time an elimination would be decided.

– Non-competition performance

– Contestant spot-selected to advance to next round

– Contestant was in the bottom five

Air date	Order	Non-contestant performer	Contestant	Song	Original artist	Lyricist	Music director	Movie (year)
30 November 2009
30 November 2009	1	Nithyasree Mahadevan		"Kottai Kattadhey"	D. K. Pattammal	T. K. Sundara Vaathiyar	G. Aswathamma	Pizhaikkum Vazhi (1948)
30 November 2009	2		SSJ08 Ovviya	"Maargazhi Thingal Allava"	S. Janaki, P. Unnikrishnan & Madhumitha	Vairamuthu	A. R. Rahman	Sangamam (1999)
30 November 2009	3		SSJ03 Balasarangan	"Poomaalai Vaangi"	K. J. Yesudas	Vaali	Ilaiyaraaja	Sindhu Bhairavi (1985)
30 November 2009	4		SSJ07 Sowmya	"Ezhu Swarangalukkul"	Vani Jayaram	Kannadasan	M. S. Viswanathan	Apoorva Raagangal (1975)
30 November 2009	5		SSJ18 Sharath	"Vasantha Mullai"	T. M. Soundararajan	A. Maruthakasi	G. Ramanathan	Sarangadhara (1958)
30 November 2009	6		SSJ22 Soundharya	"Mannavan Vanthanadi"	P. Susheela	Kannadasan	K. V. Mahadevan	Thiruvarutchelvar (1967)
1 December 2009	1		SSJ19 Roshan	"Sangeetha Jathi Mullai"	S. P. Balasubrahmanyam	Vairamuthu	Ilaiyaraaja	Kaadhal Oviyam (1982)
1 December 2009	2		SSJ16 Srinisha	"Kannodu Kanbathellam"	Nithyasree Mahadevan	Vairamuthu	A. R. Rahman	Jeans (1998)
1 December 2009	3	Nithyasree Mahadevan		Excerpt from "Kannodu Kanbathellam"	Nithyasree Mahadevan	Vairamuthu	A. R. Rahman	Jeans (1998)
1 December 2009	4		SSJ09 Vishnucharan	"Ullathil Nalla"	Seerkazhi Govindarajan	Kannadasan	Viswanathan–Ramamoorthy	Karnan (1964)
1 December 2009	5		SSJ21 Priyanka	"Kaatril Varum"	Hariharan (singer), Sadhana Sargam, Shreya Ghoshal	Vaali	Ilaiyaraaja	Oru Naal Oru Kanavu (1981)
1 December 2009	6		SSJ15 Shravan	"Oru Naal Podhumaa"	M. Balamuralikrishna	Kannadasan	K. V. Mahadevan	Thiruvilaiyadal (1965)
2 December 2009
2 December 2009	1	Lavanya Sundararaman (vocally supported at conclusion of performance by Nithyasree Mahadevan)		"Sowkiyamaa Kannae"	Nithyasree Mahadevan	Vairamuthu	A. R. Rahman	Sangamam (1999)
2 December 2009	2		SSJ Srikanth	"Kalaivaaniye"	K. J. Yesudas	Vaali	Ilaiyaraaja	Sindhu Bhairavi (1985)
2 December 2009	3		SSJ Nithyashree	"Maraindhirundhu Paakum"	P. Susheela	Kannadasan	K. V. Mahadevan	Thillana Mohanambal (1968)
2 December 2009	4		SSJ06 Prasanna Sundar	"Maadhavi Ponmayilaal"	T. M. Soundararajan & P. Susheela	Vaali	M. S. Viswanathan	Iru Malargal (1967)
2 December 2009	5		SSJ17 Shrihari	"Isai Kettaal"	T. M. Soundararajan	Kannadasan	M. S. Viswanathan	Thavaputhalvan (1972)
2 December 2009	6		SSJ04 Sahana	"Kanda Naal Mudhalai"	Subiksha & Pooja	Remix of Carnatic song, written and composed by N. S. Chidambaram	Yuvan Shankar Raja	Kanda Naal Mudhal (2005)

=== Rajnikanth special ===
- Compere: Divya
- Permanent voice trainer: Ananth Vaidyanathan
- Permanent judges: K. S. Chithra, Mano and Malgudi Subha
- Performances:

The bottom five contestants from the previous week were required to perform in a "waitlist challenge" in the first episode of the week. SSJ09 Vishnucharan was ill and considered the weakest performer, but the judges decided the contestant should receive immediate formal training in Carnatic music for his development as a musician rather than being eliminated.

The remaining episodes of 7–10 December round required the 19 contestants to perform songs from movies which starred Rajinikanth in celebration of his birthday. At the conclusion of the week, another contestant was eliminated.

– Non-competition performance – Contestant lost and was eliminated (no other bottom performers this week)

Air date	Order	Non-contestant performer	Contestant(s)	Song	Original artist	Lyricist	Music director	Movie (year)
7 December 2009
7 December 2009	1		SSJ06 Prasanna Sundar	"Sandhana Thendralai"	Hariharan & Mahalakshmi Iyer	Vairamuthu	A. R. Rahman	Kandukondain Kandukondain (2000)
7 December 2009	2		SSJ07 Sowmya	"Senthoora Poove"	S. Janaki	Gangai Amaran	Ilaiyaraaja	16 Vayathinile (1977)
7 December 2009	3		SSJ13 Shri Prasanna	"Bikshai Paathiram"	Madhu Balakrishnan	Ilaiyaraaja	Ilaiyaraaja	Naan Kadavul (2009)
7 December 2009	4		SSJ01 Monisha	"Senthoora Poove"	S. Janaki	Vaali	Ilaiyaraaja	Annakili (1976)
7 December 2009	5		SSJ09 Vishnucharan	"Isaithamizh Nee"	T. R. Mahalingam	Kannadasan	K. V. Mahadevan	Thiruvilaiyadal (1965)
7 December 2009	6		SSJ21 Priyanka	"Yengae Enathu Kavithai"	K. S. Chithra & Srinivas	Vairamuthu	A. R. Rahman	Kandukondain Kandukondain (2000)
7 December 2009	7	K. S. Chithra		Excerpt from "Yengae Enathu Kavithai"	K. S. Chithra & Srinivas	Vairamuthu	A. R. Rahman	Kandukondain Kandukondain (2000)
8 December 2009
8 December 2009	1		All contestants	Medley & Dance Routine	various	various	various	various movies starring actor Rajinikanth
8 December 2009	2		SSJ18 Sharath	"My Name is Billa"	KK & Naveen	Pa. Vijay	Yuvan Shankar Raja	Billa (2007)
8 December 2009	3		SSJ15 Shravan	"Namma Ooru Singaari"	S. P. Balasubrahmanyam	Kannadasan	M. S. Viswanathan	Ninaithale Inikkum (1979)
8 December 2009	4		SSJ09 Vishnucharan	""				
8 December 2009	5		SSJ03 Balasarangan	"Vanthenda Paalkaaran"	S. P. Balasubrahmanyam	Vairamuthu	Deva	Annaamalai (1992)
8 December 2009	6		SSJ11 Nithyashree	"Vechukava Unna Mattum"	K. J. Yesudas & S. Janaki	Gangai Amaran	Ilaiyaraaja	Nallavanuku Nallavan (1984)
8 December 2009	7		SSJ21 Priyanka	"Sundhari Kannal"	S. P. Balasubrahmanyam & S. Janaki	Vaali	Ilaiyaraaja	Thalapathi (1991)
9 December 2009	1		SSJ10 Sivaranjani	"Raa Raa"	Binny Krishnakumar & Tippu	Bhuvanachandra	Vidyasagar	Chandramukhi (2005)
9 December 2009	2		SSJ16 Srinisha	"Maasi Maasam"	K. J. Yesudas & Swarnalatha	Panchu Arunachalam and Gangai Amaran	Ilaiyaraaja	Dharma Durai (1991)
9 December 2009	3		SSJ22 Soundharya	"Maapilaikku"	Malaysia Vasudevan & Uma Ramanan	Kannadasan	Ilaiyaraaja	Netrikkann (1981)
9 December 2009	4		SSJ20 Shrikanth	"Aasaiyin Nooruvagai"	Malaysia Vasudevan	Panchu Arunachalam	Ilaiyaraaja	Adutha Varisu (1983)
9 December 2009	5		SSJ01 Monisha	"Vaa Vaa Pakkam Vaa"	S. P. Balasubrahmanyam & S. Janaki	Muthulingam	Ilaiyaraaja	Thanga Magan (1983)
9 December 2009	6		SSJ19 Roshan	"Oorai Therinchikitten"	K. J. Yesudas	Vairamuthu	Ilaiyaraaja	Padikkadavan (1985)
9 December 2009	7		SSJ13 Shri Prasanna	"Senorita"	S. P. Balasubrahmanyam	Gangai Amaran	Ilaiyaraaja	Johnny (1980)
10 December 2009	1		SSJ08 Ovviya	"Poo Maalai Oru"	S. P. Balasubrahmanyam & S. Janaki	Vaali	Ilaiyaraaja	Thanga Magan (1983)
10 December 2009	2		SSJ17 Shrihari	"Sambho Siva"	M. S. Viswanathan	Kannadasan	M. S. Viswanathan	Ninaithale Inikkum (1979)
10 December 2009	3		SSJ04 Sahana	"Konja Neram"	Asha Bhonsle & Madhu Balakrishnan	Yugabharathi	Vidyasagar	Chandramukhi (2005)
10 December 2009	4		SSJ07 Sowmya	"Thillana Thillana"	Mano & Sujatha	Vairamuthu	A. R. Rahman	Muthu (1995)
10 December 2009	5		SSJ02 Alka Ajith	"Vellai Pura"	K. J. Yesudas & S. Janaki	Vairamuthu	Ilaiyaraaja	Puthukavithai (1982)
10 December 2009	6		SSJ06 Prasanna Sundar	"Naan Autokaaran"	S. P. Balasubrahmanyam	Vairamuthu	Deva	Baashha (1995)
10 December 2009	7		SSJ10 Sivaranjani					

=== Duets ===
- Compere: Badava Gopi and Haritha Gopi (melody round) and Sivakarthikeyan and Aishwarya (peppy round)
- Permanent voice trainer: Ananth Vaidyanathan
- Permanent judges: K. S. Chithra, Mano and Malgudi Subha
- Performances:

For the 14–17 December round, the remaining 18 contestants were required to perform duet performances: first a "melody" song then a "peppy" song. Contestants who were spot-selected by the judges were seated on the "silver sofa", designating them as guest performers in next week's show, receiving immunity from this and next week's eliminations.

– Non-competition performance
– Contestant spot-selected to advance to next round
– Contestant was in the bottom four but not eliminated
– Contestant was eliminated

Air date	Order	Non-contestant performer(s)	Contestant 1	Contestant 2	Song	Original artist	Lyricist	Music director	Movie (year)
17 December 2009
17 December 2009	1	K. S. Chithra, Malgudi Subha and Mano			"Puttham Pudhu Boomi"	K. S. Chithra & Mano	Vairamuthu	A. R. Rahman	Thiruda Thiruda (1993)
17 December 2009	2		SSJ08 Ovviya	SSJ18 Sharath	"Vaadaa Maappille"	Tippu, Vadivelu, Savitha Reddy & Rita	Kabilan	Devi Sri Prasad	Villu (2009)
17 December 2009	3		SSJ09 Vishnucharan	SSJ07 Sowmya					
17 December 2009	4		SSJ01 Monisha	SSJ03 Balasarangan	"Mukkala"	A. R. Rahman, Mano & Swarnalatha	Vaali	A. R. Rahman	Kaadhalan (1994)
17 December 2009	5		SSJ17 Srihari	SSJ22 Soundharya	"Kaatru Embadhaa"	Shankar Mahadevan & Mathangi	Pa. Vijay	Yuvan Shankar Raja	Perazhagan (2004)
17 December 2009	6		SSJ22 Soundharya						

=== Christmas special ===
- Compere: Divya
- Permanent voice trainer: Ananth Vaidyanathan
- Permanent judges: K. S. Chithra, Mano and Malgudi Subha
- Performances:

The 21–24 December special round was a non-elimination showcase by all 25 of the main competition contestants.

=== Playback singer debut songs ===
- Compere: Divya
- Permanent voice trainer: Ananth Vaidyanathan
- Permanent judges: K. S. Chithra and Malgudi Subha
- Appearances by guest playback singers: Srinivas, Srimathumitha, Unni Menon, audio visual from Karthik, P. Unnikrishnan, Ramya NSK, audio visual from Harini, audio visual from Deepan Chakravarthy, Haricharan, audio visual from Sunitha Sarathy, and audio visual from Anuradha Sriram.
- Performances:

The 28–31 December round required the remaining 17 contestants to perform songs which various South Indian singers had used to debut as playback singers in Tamil cinema (a.k.a. "Kollywood"). Sharath and Ovviya were not required to compete as they had been granted immunity from the previous week's duet round. Additionally, five contestants were spot selected. Consequently, one contestant was eliminated from the remaining ten contestants.

– Non-competition performance
– Contestant spot-selected to advance to next round
– Contestant was in the bottom three
– Contestant was eliminated

Air date	Order	Non-contestant performer	Contestant	Song	Original artist	Lyricist	Music director	Movie (year)
28 December 2009	1		SSJ18 Sharath	"Sorgam Enbathu"	Srinivas & Swarnalatha	Vaali	Mahesh Mahadevan	Nammavar (1994)
28 December 2009	2	Srinivas		excerpt from "Sorgam Enbathu"	Srinivas & Swarnalatha	Vaali	Mahesh Mahadevan	Nammavar (1994)
28 December 2009	3		SSJ02 Alka Ajith	"Mudhal Mudhalai"	Srimathumitha, Benny Dayal, Yugendran & Tippu	Vaali	Harris Jayaraj	Lesa Lesa (2003)
28 December 2009	4	Srimathumitha		"Mudhal Mudhalai"	Srimathumitha, Benny Dayal, Yugendran & Tippu	Vaali	Harris Jayaraj	Lesa Lesa (2003)
28 December 2009	5		SSJ19 Roshan	"Pon Mane Kobam"	Unni Mennon & Uma Ramanan	Vairamuthu	Ilaiyaraaja	Oru Kaidhiyin Diary (1985)
28 December 2009	6	Unni Menon		excerpt from "Pon Mane Kobam"	Unni Mennon & Uma Ramanan	Vairamuthu	Ilaiyaraaja	Oru Kaidhiyin Diary (1985)
28 December 2009	7		SSJ21 Priyanka	"Poovaiketha Poovidhu"	K. S. Chithra & Gangai Amaran	Vairamuthu	Ilaiyaraaja	Neethana Antha Kuyil (1986)
28 December 2009	8		SSJ03 Balasarangan	"Adi Nenthukittaen"	Karthik & Chitra Sivaraman	Palani Bharathi	A. R. Rahman	Star (2001)
29 December 2009			SSJ20 Shrikanth	"Kannukkule"	Manicka Vinayagam	Arivumathi	Vidyasagar	Dhill (2001)
29 December 2009			SSJ11 Nithyashree	"Aiyayyo Ayyayo Pudichirukku"	Hariharan, Komal Ramesh & Mahathi	Na. Muthukumar	Harris Jayaraj	Saamy (2003)
29 December 2009			SSJ16 Srinisha	"All The Time"	Malgudi Shubha	Ilaiyaraaja	Ilaiyaraaja	Nadodi Thendral (1992)
29 December 2009			SSJ17 Shrihari	""				
30 December 2009	1		SSJ06 Prasanna Sundar	"Ennavale"	P. Unnikrishnan			Kaadhalan (1994)
30 December 2009	2	P. Unnikrishnan		excerpt from "Ennavale"	P. Unnikrishnan			Kaadhalan (1994)
30 December 2009	3		SSJ01 Monisha	"Unakkena"	Ramya NSK			Kadhalil Vizhundhen (2008)
30 December 2009	4	Ramya NSK	SSJ01 Monisha	"Unakkena" & excerpt from another song	Ramya NSK			Kadhalil Vizhundhen (2008)
30 December 2009	5		SSJ04 Sahana	"Nilaa Kaigirathu"	Harini	Vairamuthu	A. R. Rahman	Indira (2008)
30 December 2009	6		SSJ13 Shriprasanna	"Poongathave"	Deepan Chakravarthy & Uma Ramanan			Nizhalgal (1980)
31 December 2009	1		SSJ15 Shravan	"Strawberry Kanne"	KK	Vairamuthu	A. R. Rahman	Minsara Kanavu (1997)
31 December 2009	2		SSJ09 Vishnucharan	"Unakkena Iruppen"	Haricharan	Na. Muthukumar	Joshua Sridhar	Kaadhal (2004)
31 December 2009	3	Haricharan		excerpt from "Unakkena Iruppen"	Haricharan	Na. Muthukumar	Joshua Sridhar	Kaadhal (1994)
31 December 2009	4		SSJ07 Sowmya	"Thoothu Varumaa"	Sunitha Sarathy	Thamarai	Harris Jayaraj	Kaakha Kaakha (2003)
31 December 2009	5		SSJ08 Ovviya	"Ini Acham Acham Illai"	Anuradha Sriram, G. V. Prakash, Sujatha, Shweta Mohan, Esther, Sha	Thamarai	Harris Jayaraj	Indira (2008)
31 December 2009	6		SSJ01 Monisha					

=== New Year specials ===
- Compere: Divya
- Performances:

In special episodes on 31 December 2009 and 1 January 2010, the remaining 16 contestants performed with former contestants of the junior and senior versions of the show. This was a non-elimination round with no judges.

Order	Former contestant performer(s)	Current contestant performer(s)	Song	Original artist	Lyricist	Music director	Movie (year)
1	season 1 jnr finalist Saicharan	SSJ20 Shrikanth	"Illamai Idho Idho"	S. P. Balasubrahmanyam	Vaali	Ilaiyaraaja	Sakalakala Vallavan (1982)
2	season 1 jnr finalists Vignesh & Krishnamoorthy, and snr finalist Prasanna	SSJ03 Balasarangan & SSJ15 Shravan	Medley	various	various	various	various
3	season 2 snr finalist Ajeesh	SSJ19 Roshan	"Unnidam Mayangugiren"	K. J. Yesudas	Vaali	V. Kumar & G. K. Venkatesh	Then Sindhudhe Vaanam (1975)
4	season 1 snr finalist Anitha	SSJ21 Priyanka & SSJ04 Sahana	"Ezhu Swarangalukkul"	Vani Jayaram	Kannadasan	M. S. Viswanathan	Apoorva Raagangal (1975)
5	season 2 snr finalist Raginisri	SSJ16 Srinisha & SSJ11 Nithyashree	"Idhu Oru Nila"	S. Janaki	Kannadasan/Vairamuthu	Ilaiayaraaja	Tik Tik Tik (1981)
6	season 1 snr finalist Gowtham	SSJ02 Alka Ajith	"Bak Bak Bak Mudapura"	T. L. Maharajan, Balaram, Karthik, Chithra, Manjula, Sandhya, Kalyani. Mano	Pa. Vijay	Vidyasagar	Parthiban Kanavu (2003)
7	season 2 snr finalist Ranjani	SSJ09 Vishnucharan & SSJ08 Ovviya	"Manmatha Raasaa"	Shankar Mahadevan & Malathy Lakshman	Yugabharathi	Dhina	Thiruda Thirudi (2003)
8	season 2 snr finalist Ravi	SSJ06 Prasanna Sundar & SSJ17 Shrihari	"Veyilodu Vilaiyadi"	Jassie Gift, Kailash Kher, Tippu, Prasanna	Na. Muthukumar	G. V. Prakash Kumar	Veyil (2006)
9	season 2 snr finalist Renu	SSJ13 Shriprasanna	"Pothi Vacha Malliga"	S. Janaki	Vairamuthu	Ilaiayaraaja	Mann Vasanai (1983)
10	season 2 snr finalist Vijay Narayan	SSJ18 Sharath	"It's My Life"	Bon Jovi			It's My Life (Bon Jovi song)
11	season 1 snr finalist Sowmya	SSJ07 Sowmya	"Rahathulla"	Annupamaa	Thamarai	Harris Jayaraj	Ghajini (2005)

=== Dance attack ===
- Compere: Divya
- Permanent voice trainer: Ananth Vaidyanathan
- Permanent judges: Mano and Malgudi Subha
- Performances:

The 4–7 January round.

=== Village songs ===
- Compere: Divya
- Permanent voice trainer: Ananth Vaidyanathan
- Permanent judges: K. S. Chithra, Mano and Malgudi Subha
- Performances:

The 11–14 January round was in celebration of the Pongal festival, and required contestants to perform Graamiya Padalgal (English: village songs).

=== DJ mix ===
- Compere: Divya
- Permanent voice trainer: Ananth Vaidyanathan
- Permanent judges: K. S. Chithra, Mano and Malgudi Subha
- Performances:

The 18–21 January round required the remaining 15 contestants to sing old film songs which had been remixed in new films. Film stars Karthi and Andrea Jeremiah made their first appearance on the show to promote the movie Aayirathil Oruvan.

At the end of the week's performances, the bottom four contestants were waitlisted and required to perform in a waitlist challenge at the beginning of the following round.

– Non-competition performance – Contestant was in the bottom four

Air date	Order	Non-contestant performer	Contestant	Song	Original artist	Lyricist	Music director	Movie (year)
18 January 2010
18 January 2010	1	Ananth Vaidyanathan, Mano, K. S. Chithra, and Malgudi Subha		Medley	various	various	various	
18 January 2010	2		SSJ17 Shrihari	"Aasaiyin Nooruvagai" (remix)	Malaysia Vasudevan	Panchu Arunachalam	Ilaiyaraaja	Adutha Varisu (1983)
18 January 2010	3		SSJ02 Alka Ajith	"Aattamaa Therottamaa" (remix)	Swarnalatha	Gangai Amaran	Ilaiyaraaja	Captain Prabhakaran (1991)
18 January 2010	4		SSJ18 Sharath	"Pon Magal"	Mohammed Aslam & Ember Phoenix	Alangudi Somu	A. R. Rahman	Azhagiya Tamil Magan (2007)
18 January 2010	5		SSJ03 Balasarangan	"Vethayala Pottendi"	Shankar Mahadevan	Pa. Vijay	Yuvan Shankar Raja	Billa (2007)
18 January 2010	6	Andrea Jeremiah		"Maalai Neram"	Andrew Jeremiah & G. V. Prakash Kumar		G. V. Prakash Kumar	Aayirathil Oruvan (2010)
19 January 2010	1		SSJ06 Prasanna Sundar	"Taxi Taxi"	Blaaze, Benny Dayal, Javed Ali & Viviane Chaix	Blaaze, Na. Muthukumar & Viviane Chaix	A. R. Rahman	Sakkarakatti (2008)
19 January 2010	2		SSJ06 Prasanna Sundar	Excerpt from "Maadhavi Ponmayilaal" (Remixed)	T. M. Soundararajan & P. Susheela	Vaali	M. S. Viswanathan	Iru Malargal (1967)
19 January 2010	3		SSJ07 Sowmya	"Vaanam Ellai...Illai "	Shruti Haasan & Blaaze	Shruti Haasan & Blaaze	Shruti Haasan	Unnaipol Oruvan (2009)
19 January 2010	4		SSJ15 Shravan	"Andru Vandhathu Idhe Nila" (remix)	(original: T. M. Soundararajan & P. Susheela)	(original: Kannadasan)	(original: Viswanathan–Ramamoorthy)	(original: Periya Idathu Penn (1963))
19 January 2010	5		SSJ20 Shrikanth	"Thanni Karuthirichi"	Silambarasan & Vineetha Ajith	Vaali	Achu	Ennai Theriyuma? (2009)
19 January 2010	6	Karthi together with compere & judges		Excerpt from "Un Mela Aasadhaan"	Dhanush, Aishwarya Dhanush & Andrea Jeremiah		Yuvan Shankar Raja	Aayirathil Oruvan (2010)
20 January 2010	1		SSJ09 Vishnucharan	"Adiye"	Benny Dayal, Krish and Shruti Haasan	Thamarai	Harris Jayaraj	Vaaranam Aayiram (2008)
20 January 2010	2		SSJ08 Ovviya	"Erani Kuradhani Gopala"	Kalakal Smita	Vaali/Vairamuthu	A. R. Rahman	SMITA (2008 album)
20 January 2010	3		SSJ08 Ovviya	"Yeno Yeno Panithuli" (remix)	(original song: Shail Hada, Sudha Raghunathan & Andrea Jeremiah)	Thamarai	(original tune: Harris Jayaraj)	(original film: Aadhavan (2009))
20 January 2010	4		SSJ19 Roshan	"Kaalangalil Aval" (remix)	(original: P. B. Sreenivas)	Kannadasan	(original: Viswanathan–Ramamoorthy)	(original: Pava Mannippu (1961))
20 January 2010	5	Mano	SSJ Roshan	"Yennadi Meenakshi" (remix)		Vaali		Ilamai Oonjal Aadukirathu (1978)
20 January 2010	6		SSJ21 Priyanka	"Thootal Poo Malarum"	Hariharan & Harini	Vaali	Harris Jayaraj	New (2004)
20 January 2010	7	Mano & K. S. Chithra		Excerpt from original "Thootal Poo Malarum"	T. M. Soundararajan and P. Susheela	Vaali	Viswanathan–Ramamoorthy	Padagotti (1964)
21 January 2010	1		SSJ11 Nithyashree	"Thulluvadho"	Malgudi Shubha	Vaali	Vijay Antony	Sukran (2005)
21 January 2010	2		SSJ16 Srinisha	"Vaseegara"	Bombay Jayashri	Thamarai	Harris Jeyaraj	Minnale (2001)
21 January 2010	3	Malgudi Shubha	SSJ16 Srinisha	Excerpt from "Vaseegara"	Bombay Jayashri	Thamarai	Harris Jeyaraj	Minnale (2001)
21 January 2010	4	Divya & Ananth Vaidyanathan		Excerpt from "Zara Zara"	Bombay Jayashri	Sameer	Harris Jeyaraj	Rehnaa Hai Terre Dil Mein (2001)
21 January 2010	5		SSJ04 Sahana	"Palakattu Pakkathile"	Haricharan, Suchitra & Vinaya/Jaidev, Vinaya & Dr. Burn (Rap)		Yuvan Shankar Raja	Yaaradi Nee Mohini (2008)

=== Patriotic songs ===
- Compere: Divya
- Permanent voice trainer: Ananth Vaidyanathan
- Permanent judges: K. S. Chithra, Mano and Malgudi Subha
- Special guest: V. S. Kalyanam (assistant to the late Mahatma Gandhi)
- Performances:

The episode telecast on 25 January featured the waitlist challenge between the bottom four contestants from the previous week's performances. However, there was no elimination. The judges warned the weakest performers, Sowmya and Ovviya, that either would be eliminated if a bottom performer again.

The 26–28 January episodes featured performances of songs penned by poet Subramania Bharathiyar and other songs of Indian patriotism. Personal secretary to the late Mahatma Gandhi, Mr V.S. Kalyanam, appeared as a special guest. At the conclusion of the performances, in celebration of the Independence Day theme, no contestants were eliminated.

Air date	Order	Non-contestant performer	Contestant	Song	Original artist	Lyricist	Music composer/director	Source/Movie (year)
25 January 2010	1		SSJ07 Sowmya	"X Machi"	Mathangi & Nakul	Vaali	Harris Jayaraj	Ghajini (2005)
25 January 2010	2		SSJ09 Vishnucharan	"Chithiram Pesuthadi"	T. M. Soundararajan	Ku. Ma. Balasubramaniam	T. G. Lingappa	Sabaash Meena (1958)
25 January 2010	3		SSJ08 Ovviya					
25 January 2010	4		SSJ04 Sahana	"Kaatrin Mozhi"	Sujatha	Vairamuthu	Vidyasagar	Mozhi (2013)
26 January 2010
26 January 2010	1	Mano, K. S. Chithra, and Malgudi Subha		"Puttham Pudhu Boomi"	K. S. Chithra & Mano	Vairamuthu	A. R. Rahman	Thiruda Thiruda (1993)
26 January 2010	2		SSJ20 Shrikanth	"Thai Manne Vanakkam"	A. R. Rahman	Vairamuthu	A. R. Rahman	Vande Mataram (1997 album)
26 January 2010	3		SSJ03 Balasarangan	"Paarukkule Nalla Naadu"		Subramania Bharathiyar	Traditional Carnatic music composition	Traditional Carnatic music composition
26 January 2010	4		SSJ08 Ovviya	"Indhiya Naadu"	T. M. Soundararajan, M. S. Viswanathan, Malaysia Vasudevan, K. Veeramani, P. Susheela & L. R. Eswari	Vaali	M. S. Viswanathan	Bharatha Vilas (1973)
26 January 2010	5		SSJ15 Shravan	"Chinnanchiru Kiliye"	M. L. Vasanthakumari & M. K. Thyagaraja Bhagavathar	Subramania Bharathiyar	C. R. Subbaraman	Manamagal (1951)
26 January 2010	6		SSJ16 Srinisha	"Aaduvome Pallu Paaduvome"	D. K. Pattammal	Subramania Bharathiyar	R. Sudharsanam	Naam Iruvar (1947)
27 January 2010	1		SSJ02 Alka Ajith	"Kappaleri Poyaachu"	S. P. Balasubrahmanyam & P. Susheela	Vaali	A. R. Rahman	Indian (1996)
27 January 2010	2		SSJ08 Sharath	"Sindhu Nadhiyin Isai"	T. M. Soundararajan, L. R. Easwari & J. V. Raghavulu	Subramania Bharathiyar	Viswanathan–Ramamoorthy	Kai Koduttha Dheivam (1964)
27 January 2010	3		SSJ07 Sowmya	"Suttum Vizhi"	Hariharan	Subramania Bharathiyar	A. R. Rahman	Kandukondain Kandukondain (2000)
27 January 2010	4		SSJ09 Vishnucharan	"Endru Thaniyum Indha"	Trichy G. Loganathan	Subramania Bharathiyar	G. Ramanathan	Kappalottiya Thamizhan (1961)
27 January 2010	5		SSJ04 Sahana	"Kakkai Chiraginile"	Sudha Raghunathan	Subramania Bharathiyar	Traditional Carnatic music composition	Traditional Carnatic music composition (version: "Bharathiyar Padalgal Vol. 1" (1998) – Carnatic music album released by Amutham)
28 January 2010	1		SSJ17 Shrihari	"Shivashakthi"	Nithyasree Mahadevan	Subramania Bharathiyar	Lalitha Sivakumar (mother of Nithyasree Mahadevan)	"Ragam Vol. 1" (1998) – Carnatic music album released by Amutham
28 January 2010	2		SSJ21 Priyanka	"Vellai Thamarai"	M. L. Vasanthakumari	Subramania Bharathiyar	G. Ramanathan	Thai Ullam (1952)
28 January 2010	3		SSJ19 Roshan	"Vellai Pookkal"	A. R. Rahman	Vairamuthu	A. R. Rahman	Kannathil Muthamittal (2002)
28 January 2010	4		SSJ11 Nithyashree	"Theeradha Vilaiyattu"	D. K. Pattammal	Subramania Bharathiyar	R. Sudharsanam	Vedala Ulagam (1948)
28 January 2010	5		SSJ06 Prasanna Sundar	"Thikku Theriyadha"	G. N. Balasubramaniam	Subramania Bharathiyar	Traditional Carnatic music composition	Traditional Carnatic music composition

=== Kings and queens ===
- Compere: Sivakarthikeyan (Tenali) and Aishwarya (Perazhagi)
- Permanent voice trainer: Ananth Vaidyanathan (Rajaguru)
- Permanent judges: Mano (Raja) and Malgudi Subha (Rani)
- Performances:

The 1–4 February round required the remaining 15 contestants to perform songs on a theme of kings and queens. The comperes, voice trainer, permanent judges, and contestants dressed as ancient Indian kings and queens, and spoke in Middle Tamil. Viewers expressed positive comments about the concept and were later disappointed that the following two seasons of the show did not repeat the round to the same high standard. During the 2 February episode, dancer Priyadarshini gave a special performance to a medley of songs.

– Special non-competition performance

– Contestant was in the bottom three (Vishnucharan)

– Contestant was eliminated

Air date	Order	Non-contestant performer	Contestant	Song	Original artist	Lyricist	Music director	Movie (year)
1 February 2010
1 February 2010	1	Mano and Malgudi Shubha		Excerpt from "Raajaavin Paarvai"	T. M. Soundararajan & P. Susheela	Vaali	M. S. Viswanathan	Anbe Vaa (1966)
1 February 2010	2		SSJ15 Shravan	"Sindhanai Sei Maname"	T. M. Soundararajan	G. Ramanathan	K. D. Santhanam	Ambikapathy (1957)
1 February 2010	3		SSJ16 Srinisha	"Azhaikkathe Ninaikkathe"	P. Susheela	Thanjai N. Ramaiah Dass	S. Rajeswara Rao	Manaalane Mangaiyin Bhagyam (1957)
1 February 2010			SSJ03 Balasarangan					
1 February 2010	5			"Mannavar Porulkalai"	T. M. Soundararajan	Kannadasan	Viswanathan–Ramamoorthy	Karnan (1964)
1 February 2010	5	Malgudi Shubha (dance by compere Aishwarya)		Excerpt from "Azhagana Ponnu Naan"	P. Bhanumathi	A. Maruthakasi	Susarla Dakshinamurthy	Alibabavum 40 Thirudargalum (1964)
1 February 2010	6		SSJ21 Priyanka	"Kannukku Kulamedhu"	P. Susheela	Kannadasan	Viswanathan–Ramamoorthy	Karnan (1964)
1 February 2010	7	Mano (dance by compere Aishwarya)		Excerpt from "Maraindhirundhu"	P. Susheela	Kannadasan	K. V. Mahadevan	Thillana Mohanambal (1968)
1 February 2010	8			Excerpt from "Kalyaana Samayal Saadham"	Trichy Loganathan	Thanjai N. Ramaiah Dass	Ghantasala	Mayabazar (1968)
2 February 2010	1		SSJ02 Alka Ajith	"Mayakkum Maalai"	Jikki & A. M. Rajah	Thanjai N. Ramaiah Dass	Viswanathan–Ramamoorthy	Gulebakavali (1955)
2 February 2010	2		SSJ18 Sharath	"Paadaatha Paatellaam"	P. B. Sreenivas & S. Janaki	Kannadasan	Viswanathan–Ramamoorthy	Veerathirumagan (1962)
2 February 2010	3		SSJ19 Roshan	"Kaaviyamaa Nenjil"	C. S. Jayaraman & P. Susheela	A. Maruthakesi	K. V. Mahadevan	Paavai Vilakku (1960)
2 February 2010	4		SSJ07 Sowmya	"Thesulavudhe"	Ghantasala & P. Susheela	Thanjai N. Ramaiah Dass	Adi Narayana Rao	Manalane Mangayin Bhagyam (1957)
3 February 2010	1		SSJ11 Nithyashree	"Unnazhagai Kanniyargal"	P. Susheela	K. S. Gopalakrishnan	G. Ramanathan	Uthama Puthiran (1958)
3 February 2010	2		SSJ09 Vishnucharan	"Mullai Malar Mele"	T. M. Soundararajan & P. Susheela	A. Maruthakasi	G. Ramanathan	Uthama Puthiran (1958)
3 February 2010	3		SSJ20 Srikanth	"Achcham Enbathu"	T. M. Soundararajan	Kannadasan	Viswanathan Ramamoorthy	Mannadhi Mannan (1958)
3 February 2010	4		SSJ08 Ovviya	"Kannum Kannum Kalanthu"	P. Leela & Jikki	Kothamangalam Subbu	C. Ramchandra	Vanjikottai Valiban (1958)
4 February 2010	1		SSJ04 Sahana	"Mannavan Vanthanadi"	P. Susheela	Kannadasan	K. V. Mahadevan	Thiruvarutchelvar (1967)
4 February 2010	2		SSJ06 Prasanna Sundar	"Omkaaramaai Vilangum"	T. M. Soundararajam	Kannadasan	K. V. Mahadevan	Vanangamudi (1967)
4 February 2010	3		SSJ17 Shrihari	"Paatum Naane"	T. M. Soundararajan	Kannadasan	K. V. Mahadevan	Thiruvilaiyadal (1965)
4 February 2010	4	Ananth Vaidyanathan		"Vaapul Moraa" in Sindhubhairavi raag				
4 February 2010	5		SSJ07 Sowmya					

=== Medley round ===
- Compere: Divya
- Permanent voice trainer: Ananth Vaidyanathan
- Permanent judges: Mano
- Special guest judges: Harish Raghavendra and Pop Shalini
- Performances:

The 8–11 February round required the remaining 14 contestants to sing a series of songs in a medley form.

– Non-competition performance
– Contestant advanced to next round (Priyanka, Sahana, Nithyashree, Ovviya)
– Contestant was in the bottom three (Prasanna Sundar, Shrihari and Vishnucharan)
– Contestant was eliminated

Air date	Order	Non-contestant performer	Contestant	Song	Original artist	Lyricist	Music director	Movie (year)
8 February 2010
8 February 2010	1	Mano, Harish Raghavendra & Pop Shalini		Excerpt from "Thulluvadho Ilamai"	T. M. Soundararajan & L. R. Eswari	Vaali	M. S. Viswanathan	Kudiyirundha Koyil (1968)
8 February 2010	2	Ananth Vaidyanathan		Excerpt from				
11 February 2010
11 February 2010			SSJ09 Vishnucharan	"Ullathil Nalla"	Seerkazhi Govindarajan	Kannadasan	Viswanathan–Ramamoorthy	Karnan (1964)

=== Love songs ===
- Compere: Divya
- Permanent voice trainer: Ananth Vaidyanathan
- Permanent judges: K. S. Chithra and Mano
- Performances:

The 14–18 February Kaadhal Geethangal (English: love songs) round was split over two parts. First requiring contestants to sing a duet in pairs, then to sing another song as a solo performance. Judges granted immunity to the strongest duet performers, who were not required to give a competitive solo performance.

In the 15 February episode, Prem and Hamsadhwani, winners of the first season of the Vijay TV dance competition reality show, appeared as special guests. The duet performance of Nithyashree and Shrihari was dedicated to them, and followed by a brief duet dance by Nithyashree and Prem.

In the 16 February episode, Badava Gopi and Haritha Gopi appeared as special guests. The duet performance of Prasanna Sundar and Srinisha Jayaseelan was dedicated to them. Carnatic vocalist and playback singer Charulatha Mani and her husband Karthick also appeared as special guests. The trio performance by Shrikanth, Ovviya and Sharath was dedicated to them.

In the 17 February episode, Pushpavanam Kuppuswamy and Anitha Kuppuswamy appeared as special guests.

– Non-competition performance
– Contestant spot-selected to advance to next round
– Contestant was in the bottom four (also Sahana)
– Contestant was eliminated

Air date	Order	Non-contestant performer(s)	Contestant 1	Contestant 2	Contestant 3	Song	Original artist	Lyricist	Music director	Movie (year)
15 February 2010	1		SSJ02 Alka Ajith	SSJ19 Roshan		"Thoda Thoda"	S. P. Balasubrahmanyam & K. S. Chithra	Vairamuthu	A. R. Rahman	Indira (1995)
15 February 2010	2	K. S. Chithra				Excerpt from "Thoda Thoda"	S. P. Balasubrahmanyam & K. S. Chithra	Vairamuthu	A. R. Rahman	Indira (1995)
15 February 2010	3		SSJ02 Alka Ajith	(solo – non-competitive performance due to spot selection)		Excerpt from "Snehithane"	Sadhana Sargam & Srinivas	Vairamuthu	A. R. Rahman	Alai Payuthey
15 February 2010	4		SSJ19 Roshan	(solo – non-competitive due to spot selection)		Excerpt from "Raja Raja Cholan"	K. J. Yesudas	Mu. Metha	Ilaiyaraaja	Rettai Vaal Kuruvi (1987)
15 February 2010	5		SSJ15 Shravan	SSJ21 Priyanka		"Thoongaadha Vizhigal"	S. Janaki & K. J. Yesudas	Vaali	Ilaiyaraaja	Agni Natchathiram (1988)
15 February 2010	6		SSJ15 Shravan	(solo – non-competitive due to spot selection)		Excerpt from "En Kadhalae"	S. P. Balasubrahmanyam & K. S. Chithra	Vairamuthu	A. R. Rahman	Duet (1994)
15 February 2010	7		SSJ11 Nithyashree	SSJ17 Shrihari		"Uppu Karuvadu"	Shankar Mahadevan & Kavita Krishnamurthy	Vairamuthu	A. R. Rahman	Mudhalvan (1999)
16 February 2010	1		SSJ03 Balasarangan	SSJ04 Sahana		"Kaatre En Vasal"	P. Unnikrishnan & Kavita Krishnamurthy	Vairamuthu	A. R. Rahman	Rhythm (2000)
16 February 2010	2		SSJ06 Prasanna Sundar	SSJ16 Srinisha		"Kangal Irandal"	Belly Raj & Deepa Miriam	Thamarai	James Vasanthan	Subramaniapuram (2008)
16 February 2010	3		SSJ06 Prasanna Sundar	(solo – non-competitive due to spot selection)		Excerpt from "Oru Poiyavadhu"	Hariharan, Srinivas & Sujatha	Vairamuthu	A. R. Rahman	Jodi (1999)
16 February 2010	4	Charulatha Mani				"Vaseegara"	Bombay Jayashri	Thamarai	Harris Jeyaraj	Minnale (2001)
16 February 2010	5		SSJ20 Shrikanth	SSJ08 Ovviya	SSJ18 Sharath	"En Uchimandai"	Krishna Iyer, Shoba Chandrasekhar, Charulatha Mani & Shakthisree Gopalan	Annamalai	Vijay Antony	Vettaikaaran (2009)
16 February 2010	6		SSJ20 Shrikanth	(solo – non-competitive due to spot selection)		"Pottu Vaitha Kathal Thitam"	Kamal Haasan & Mano	Vaali	Ilaiyaraaja	Singaravelan (1992)
17 February 2010
17 February 2010	1	Pushpavanam Kuppuswamy	(solo)			"Oru Sevatha Ponnu Karuthapayana"				Saravana Poigai (Tamil album)
17 February 2010	2		SSJ21 Priyanka	(solo)		"Unnai Kaanaadha Kannum"	P. Susheela	Kannadasan	K. V. Mahadevan	Idhayak Kamalam (1965)
17 February 2010	3		SSJ08 Ovviya	(solo)		"Uyire Uyire"	Hariharan & K. S. Chithra	Vairamuthu	A. R. Rahman	Bombay (1995)
17 February 2010	4	K. S. Chithra	(solo)			Excerpt from "Uyire Uyire"	Hariharan & K. S. Chithra	Vairamuthu	A. R. Rahman	Bombay (1995)
17 February 2010	5		SSJ18 Sharath	(solo)		"Senorita"	S. P. Balasubrahmanyam	Gangai Amaran	Ilaiyaraaja	Johnny (1980)
17 February 2010	6		SSJ04 Sahana	(solo)		"Narumugaye"	P. Unnikrishnan & Bombay Jayashri	Vairamuthu	A. R. Rahman	Iruvar (1997)
18 February 2010	1		SSJ	(solo)		""				
18 February 2010	2		SSJ	(solo)		""				

=== Devotional songs ===
- Compere: Uma Padmanabhan
- Permanent voice trainer: Ananth Vaidyanathan
- Permanent judges: K. S. Chithra and Mano
- Special guest judge: L. R. Eswari (23–24 April), Veeramani Raju (25 April)
- Performances:

The 22–25 February Bhakthi Padalgal (English: devotional songs) round required the remaining 12 contestants to perform songs from the devotional genre. The first song was required to have been released in film. Contestants who were not spot-selected after their first song were required to perform a second song which had not yet been released in film.

In the second and third episodes this week, devotional playback singer L. R. Eswari appeared on the show as a guest judge and guest performer. Pastor Alwyn Thomas also appeared on the show for a special guest performance in the third episode of the round. In the fourth and final episode of the round, devotional singer Veeramani Raju appeared as a guest judge and guest performer. The compere for this round also provided a special performance in this episode before contestant SSJ06 Prasanna Sundar delivered a well-received performance of a "rare" and "difficult" song popularised by Nithyasree Mahadevan.

– Non-competition performance
– Contestant spot-selected to advance to next round with immunity
– Contestant was in the bottom three
– Contestant was eliminated

Air date	Order	Non-contestant performer	Contestant	Song	Original artist	Lyricist	Music composer/director	Source/Movie (year)
22 February 2010
22 February 2010	1		SSJ19 Roshan	"Maruthamalai Mamaniye"	Madurai Somu	Kannadasan	Kunnakudi Vaidyanathan	Deivam (1972)
22 February 2010	2		SSJ16 Srinisha	"Ariyathu"	K. B. Sundarambal	Kannadasan	K. V. Mahadevan	Kandan Karunai (1967)
22 February 2010	3		SSJ20 Shrikanth	"Thirupathi Mazhai"	Sirkazhi Govindarajan	Kannadasan	K. V. Mahadevan	Thirumalai Thenkumari (1970)
22 February 2010	4		SSJ21 Priyanka	"Solla Solla"	P. Susheela	Kannadasan	K. V. Mahadevan	Kandan Karunai (1967)
22 February 2010	5		SSJ17 Shrihari	"Isai Thamizh Nee Seidha"	T. R. Mahalingam	Kannadasan	K. V. Mahadevan	Thiruvilaiyadal (1965)
22 February 2010	6		SSJ18 Sharath	"Janani Jagam Nee"	Deepan Chakravarthy, Krishnachandran & Ilaiyaraja	Vaali	Ilaiyaraaja	Thai Moogambigai (1982)
23 February 2010
23 February 2010	1		SSJ11 Nithyashree	"Thirupparang Kundrathil"	Rajalakshmi of Soolamangalam Sisters & P. Susheela	Kannadasan	K. V. Mahadevan	Kandan Karunai (1967)
23 February 2010	2		SSJ03 Balasarangan	"Thiruchendhurin"	T. M. Soundararajan & Sirkazhi Govindarajan	Kannadasan	Kunnakudi Vaidyanathan	Deivam (1972)
23 February 2010	3	L. R. Eswari		"Magamaayi Samapurathaaye"	L. R. Eswari			Chellaaththaa Maariyaa Thithaa
23 February 2010	4		SSJ06 Prasanna Sundar	"Om Sivoham"	Vijay Prakash	Vaali	Ilaiyaraaja	Naan Kadavul (2009)
23 February 2010	5		SSJ02 Alka Ajith	"Komaathaa Engal Kulamaathaa"	P. Susheela	Kannadasan	K. V. Mahadevan	Saraswathi Sabatham (1966)
23 February 2010	6		SSJ15 Shravan	"Kannan Vandhaan"	T. M. Soundararajan & Sirkazhi Govindarajan	Kannadasan	M. S. Viswanathan	Ramu (1966)
23 February 2010	7		SSJ04 Sahana	"Azhagan Muruganidam"	P. Susheela	Kannadasan	Viswanathan–Ramamoorthy	Panchavarna Kili (1965)
24 February 2010
24 February 2010	1		SSJ18 Sharath	"Mel Maruvathur Aadhi Paraashakthi"	K. Veeramani			
24 February 2010	2		SSJ11 Nithyashree	"Chellathaa Chella Maariyaathaa"	L. R. Eswari			Chellaaththaa Maariyaa Thithaa
24 February 2010	3	Ananth Vaidyanathan		"Yaar Arivaaro Yaadhava Leela" in Hindustani raag				
24 February 2010	4		SSJ03 Balasarangan	"Varuvaai Varuvaai" in ragas Rageshri, Bhageshri & Mohanam	Sudha Raghunathan	Subramania Bharathiyar	K. S. Raghu	Radha Sametha Krishna (Carnatic/Hindu devotional album)
24 February 2010	5	Pastor Alwyn Thomas		"En Chellam"	Pastor Alwyn Thomas	Pastor Alwyn Thomas	Pastor Alwyn Thomas	Nandri Vol.4 (Christian devotional album)
24 February 2010	6		SSJ15 Shravan	"Om Namo Narayana" in raga Karnaranjani		Ambujam Krishna	Charumathi Ramachandran	
25 February 2010
25 February 2010	1		SSJ20 Shrikanth	"Iraivan Idam Kai"	Nagore E. M. Haniffa		SV. Venkataraman	Iraivanidam Kaiyendhungal (2003 Muslim devotional album)
25 February 2010	2	Mano		"Allahu"	Mano	R. Abdul Salam	A. R. Rahman	Deen Isai Maalai (1989 Muslim devotional album)
25 February 2010	3	Veeramani Raju		"Kothaiyin Thiruppaavai"	Amarar K. Veeramani	Kannadasan	Ilaiyaraaja	Sri Krishna Ganam (Hindu devotional album)
25 February 2010	4		SSJ04 Sahana	"Paal Vadiyum" in raga Nattaikkurinji		Oothukkadu Venkata Kavi	Traditional Hindu Carnatic music composition	
25 February 2010	5	Uma Padmanabhan		"Kakkai Chiraginile" in ragamalika		Subramania Bharathiyar		
25 February 2010	6		SSJ06 Prasanna Sundar	"Vanna Mayil" (viruttam) followed by "Shanmukha Kandhanum Mohana Kannanum" in ragas Shanmukhapriya & Mohanam	Nithyasree Mahadevan	Satthoor Karpagam		
25 February 2010	7		SSJ19 Roshan	"Kurai Onrum Illai" in ragas Sivaranjani, Kapi & Sindhubhairavi	M. S. Subbulakshmi	C. Rajagopalachari	Kadayanallur Venkataraman	
25 February 2010	8		SSJ03 Balasarangan	"Vedam"	S. P. Balasubrahmanyam & S. P. Sailaja	Vairamuthu	Ilaiyaraaja	Salangai Oli (1983)

=== Vinnaithaandi Varuvaaya special ===
- Compere: Divya
- Permanent voice trainer: Ananth Vaidyanathan
- Permanent judges: Malgudi Shubha, K. S. Chithra and Mano
- Special guest for 1 March 2010 and 2 March 2010 episodes: Gautham Vasudev Menon
- Performances:

The 1–4 March round promoted the release of the film Vinnaithaandi Varuvaayaa, directed by Gautham Vasudev Menon and starring actor Silambarasan ("Simbu"). The first part of the round required the remaining 11 contestants to sing songs from Tamil films directed by Menon, who appeared as a special guest judge. Playback singer Vijay Prakash gave a special performance to open the round. The second part of the round required the contestants to sing songs from films starring actor Simbu.

– Non-competition performance
– Contestant spot-selected to advance to next round
– Contestant was in the bottom three
– Contestant was eliminated

Air date	Order	Non-contestant performer	Contestant(s)	Song	Original artist	Lyricist	Music director	Movie (year)
1 March 2010
1 March 2010	1	Vijay Prakash	Top 11 contestants	"Hosanna"	Vijay Prakash, Suzanne & Blaaze	Thamarai	A. R. Rahman	Vinnaithaandi Varuvaayaa (2010)
1 March 2010	2		SSJ19 Roshan	"Ennai Konjam"	Timmy, Tippu & Pop Shalini	Thamarai	Harris Jayaraj	Kaakha Kaakha (2003)
1 March 2010	3		SSJ06 Prasanna Sundar	"Nenjikkul Peidhidum"	Hariharan, Krish, Devan Ekambaram and Prasanna	Thamarai	Harris Jayaraj	Vaaranam Aayiram (2008)
1 March 2010	4		SSJ04 Sahana	"Yeno Yeno Panithuli"	Shail Hada, Sudha Raghunathan & Andrea Jeremiah	Thamarai	Harris Jayaraj	Aadhavan (2009)
1 March 2010	5		SSJ21 Priyanka	"Manmadhane"	Sadhana Sargam	Snehan	Yuvan Shankar Raja	Manmadhan (2004)
1 March 2010	6		SSJ11 Nithyashree	"Unakkul Naane"	Bombay Jayashri	Rohini	Harris Jayaraj	Pachaikili Muthucharam (2007)
2 March 2010	last		SSJ20 Shrikanth	"Ava Enna"	Karthik & Prasanna	Thamarai	Harris Jayaraj	Vaaranam Aayiram (2008)
3 March 2010	first		SSJ11 Nithyashree	"Yammaadi Aathaadi"	Vijaya T. Rajendar, Suchithra, Simbu & Mahathi	Perarasu	Yuvan Shankar Raja	Pachaikili Muthucharam (2007)
3 March 2010			SSJ19 Roshan	Vechikkava Remix	Simbu & Suchitra	Gangai Amaran	Yuvan Shankar Raja	Silambattam (2008)
3 March 2010			SSJ17 Shrihari	"Where Is the Party"	Mukesh & Priyadarshini	Simbu	Yuvan Shankar Raja	Silambattam (2008)
3 March 2010			SSJ02 Alka Ajith	"Mannipaaya"	A. R. Rahman & Shreya Ghoshal	Thamarai	A. R. Rahman	Vinnaithaandi Varuvaayaa (2010)
3 March 2010			SSJ15 Shravan	"Hosanna"	Vijay Prakash, Suzanne D'Mello & Blaaze	Thamarai	A. R. Rahman	Vinnaithaandi Varuvaayaa (2010)
3 March 2010		Mano		variation of "Olimaiyamaana"			Viswanathan–Ramamoorthy	
3 March 2010	last		SSJ21 Priyanka	Encore of "Manmadhane"	Sadhana Sargam	Snehan	Yuvan Shankar Raja	Manmadhan (2004)
4 March 2010			SSJ18 Sharath	"Kallakuven"	Silambarasan & Shankar Mahadevan	Thamarai	Deva & Sabesh–Murali	Dum (2003)
4 March 2010			SSJ04 Sahana	"Yaaridamum Thondravilai"	Harini & Ramesh Vinayagam	Snehan	Harris Jayaraj	Thotti Jaya (2003)
4 March 2010			SSJ17 Shrihari	"Kallai Mattum"	Hariharan	Vaali	A. R. Rahman	Dasavatharam (2008)

=== Final ten round ===
- Compere: Divya
- Special guest judges: Suchithra Karthik Kumar & Naresh Iyer
- Performances:

The 8–11 March round marked there being 10 remaining contestants and had no elimination. Instead, special prizes of ₹1 lakh (100,000 rupees) were awarded to the best male and best female performance from the round. The prizes went to Shrikanth for male performance and was split between Alka Ajith and Nithyashree for female performance. Srinisha was given special recognition by the guest judges.

Playback singer Suchithra Karthik Kumar made her first appearance on the show, as a guest judge for this round. Playback singer Naresh Iyer also appeared as a guest judge, and had competed in the first season of Airtel Super Singer.

=== New songs ===
- Compere: Divya
- Permanent voice trainer: Ananth Vaidyanathan
- Permanent judges: Mano and Malgudi Subha
- Performances:

The 15–18 March Pudhu Padalgal (English: new songs) round required the remaining 10 contestants to sing songs from films released in 2008 and 2009. The first song was required to be a fast song, and the second song was required to be a melody song. Contestant SSJ16 Srinisha won immunity after performing her fast song. Contestant SSJ02 Alka Ajith was announced best performer of the melody song segment.

– Non-competition performance
– Contestant advanced to next round
– Contestant was in the bottom four
– Contestant was eliminated

Air date	Order	Non-contestant performer	Contestant	Song	Original artist	Lyricist	Music director	Movie (year)
15 March 2010
15 March 2010	1	Mano and Malgudi Shubha		"Maasi Maasi"	Mano & Mega	Vaali	Harris Jayaraj	Aadhavan (2009)
15 March 2010	2		SSJ06 Prasanna Sundar	"Mambo Mamiya"	Vikram & Rita	Viveka	Devi Sri Prasad	Kanthaswamy (2008)
15 March 2010	3		SSJ20 Srikanth	"Puli Urumudhu"	Ananthu & Mahesh Vinayakram	Kabilan	Vijay Antony	Vettaikaaran (2009)
15 March 2010	4		SSJ04 Sahana	"Allegra Allegra"	Rita	Viveka	Devi Sri Prasad	Kanthaswamy (2009)
15 March 2010	5		SSJ21 Priyanka	"Karigalan Kala"	Suchith Suresan & Sangeetha Rajeshwaran	Kabilan	Vijay Antony	Vettaikaaran (2009)
15 March 2010	6		SSJ15 Shravan	"Pala Pala"	Hariharan	Na. Muthukumar	Harris Jayaraj	Ayan (2009)
16 March 2010
16 March 2010	1	Ananth Vaidyanathan, Mano and Malgudi Shubha		Medley				
16 March 2010	2		SSJ16 Srinisha	"Daddy Mummy"	Mamta Mohandas & Naveen Madhav	Devi Sri Prasad	Viveka	Villu (2009)
16 March 2010	3		SSJ18 Sharath	"Taxi Taxi"	Blaaze, Benny Dayal, Javed Ali & Viviane Chaix	Blaaze, Na. Muthukumar & Viviane Chaix	A. R. Rahman	Sakkarakatti (2008)
16 March 2010	4		SSJ02 Alka Ajith	"Dheemthanakka Thillana"	Devi Sri Prasad & Divya	Snehan	Devi Sri Prasad	Villu (2009)
16 March 2010	5		SSJ19 Roshan	"En Uchimandai"	Krishna Iyer, Shoba Chandrasekhar, Charulatha Mani & Shakthisree Gopalan	Annamalai	Vijay Antony	Vettaikaaran (2009)
16 March 2010	6		SSJ11 Nithyashree	"Oyaayiye Yaayiye"	Benny Dayal, Haricharan & Chinmayi	Na. Muthukumar	Harris Jayaraj	Ayan (2009)
17 March 2010	1		SSJ04 Sahana	"Oru Vikkam Varuthe"	Shreya Ghoshal	Thamarai	James Vasanthan	Pasanga (2009)
17 March 2010	2		SSJ15 Shravan	"Bikshai Paathiram"	Madhu Balakrishnan	Ilaiyaraaja	Ilaiyaraaja	Naan Kadavul (2009)
17 March 2010	3		SSJ21 Priyanka	"Azhagaai Pookuthe"	Janaki Iyer & Prasanna	Kalai Kumar	Vijay Antony	Ninaithale Inikkum (2009)
17 March 2010	4		SSJ20 Srikanth	"Adiye"	Benny Dayal, Krish and Shruti Haasan	Thamarai	Harris Jayaraj	Vaaranam Aayiram (2008)
17 March 2010	5		SSJ19 Roshan	""	Divya			
18 March 2010	1		SSJ02 Alka Ajith	"Marudaani"	Madhushree, A. R. Rahman, Hentry Kuruvilla	Vaali	A. R. Rahman	Sakkarakatti (2008)
18 March 2010	2		SSJ18 Sharath	""				
18 March 2010	3		SSJ11 Nithyashree	"Mukundha Mukundha"	Kamal Haasan & Sadhana Sargam	Vaali	A. R. Rahman	Dasavathaaram (2008)
18 March 2010	4		SSJ06 Prasanna Sundar	"Vennmegam"	Hariharan	Na. Muthukumar	Yuvan Shankar Raja	Yaaradi Nee Mohini (2008)
18 March 2010	5	Malgudi Shubha		"Thendral Vandhu"	Ilaiyaraaja & S. Janaki	Vaali	Ilaiyaraaja	Avatharam (1995)
18 March 2010	6		SSJ04 Sahana					

=== Moon songs ===
- Compere: Divya
- Permanent voice trainer: Ananth Vaidyanathan
- Permanent judges: K. S. Chithra, Mano and Malgudi Subha
- Special guest judge: P. B. Sreenivas (22 March only)
- Performances:

The 22–25 March Nila Padalgal (English: moon songs) round required the remaining nine contestants to perform songs over two parts which fit the theme of "the moon". The set was transformed and everyone was dressed in white to complement the theme.

The first part of the round required contestants to sing songs from films released before 1980. The special guest of the week was veteran playback singer, P. B. Sreenivas, who was well known for this subgenre. After the performance of contestant SSJ18 Sharath, Sreenivas sang the first line of the song when giving his feedback on the performance.

The second part of the round required contestants to sing hits from films released after 1980. Contestant SSJ02 Alka Ajith was announced the best performer of this part of the round, followed by contestants SSJ11 Nithyashree and SSJ21 Priyanka.

– Non-competition performance

– Contestant was in the bottom two

– Contestant was eliminated

Air date	Order	Non-contestant performer	Contestant(s)	Song	Original artist	Lyricist	Music director	Movie (year)
22 March 2010
22 March 2010	1	Mano, K. S. Chithra and Malgudi Shubha		Excerpt from "Aha Inba Nilavinile"	Ghantasala & P. Leela	Thanjai N. Ramaiah Dass	Ghantasala	Mayabazar (1957)
22 March 2010	2		SSJ19 Roshan	"Aayiram Nilave Vaa"	S. P. Balasubrahmanyam & P. Susheela	Pulamaipithan	K. V. Mahadevan	Adimai Penn (1969)
22 March 2010	3		SSJ11 Nithyashree	"Vaaraayo Vennilaave"	A. M. Rajah & P. Leela	Pulamaipithan	S. Rajeswara Rao	Missamma (1954 Tamil film)
22 March 2010	4	Mano		Excerpt from "Ravoyi Chandamama"	A. M. Raja & P. Leela	Pingali Nagendrarao	S. Rajeswara Rao	Missamma (1955 Telugu film)
22 March 2010	5		SSJ18 Sharath	"Nilave Ennidam"	P. B. Sreenivas & P. Susheela	Kannadasan	M. S. Viswanathan	Ramu (1966)
22 March 2010	6	Ananth Vaidyanathan		"Kanavile Varum Nilave" in raga Mohanam				
22 March 2010	7		SSJ16 Srinisha	"Amudhai Pozhiyum Nilave"	P. Susheela	Ku Ma Balasubramaniam	T. G. Lingappa	Thangamalai Ragasiyam (1957)
23 March 2010	1		SSJ15 Shravan	"Iravum Nilavum"	T. M. Soundararajan & P. Susheela	Kannadasan	Viswanathan–Ramamoorthy	Karnan (1964)
23 March 2010	2		SSJ21 Priyanka	"Naalai Indha Velai"	P. Susheela	Vaali	M. S. Viswanathan	Uyarndha Manidhan (1968)
23 March 2010	3		SSJ20 Srikanth	"Andru Vandhadhum Idhe Nilaa"	T. M. Soundararajan & P. Susheela	Kannadasan	Viswanathan–Ramamoorthy	Periya Idathu Penn (1963)
23 March 2010	4		SSJ02 Alka Ajith	"Inbam Pongum Vennilaa"	P. B. Sreenivas & P. Suseela	Ku. Ma. Balasubramaniam	G. Ramanathan	Veerapandiya Kattabomman (1959)
23 March 2010	5		SSJ06 Prasanna Sundar	"Oru Pennai Paarthu Nilavai"	T. M. Soundararajan	Vaali	Viswanathan–Ramamoorthy	Dheiva Thaai (1964)
24 March 2010	1		SSJ21 Priyanka	"Kalyaana Thennilaa"	K. J. Yesudas & K. S. Chithra	Pulamaipithan	Ilaiyaraaja	Mounam Sammadham (1990)
24 March 2010	2	K. S. Chithra (vocally supported by Mano)		Extended excerpt from "Kalyaana Thennilaa"	K. S. Chithra	Pulamaipithan	Ilaiyaraaja	Mounam Sammadham (1990)
24 March 2010	3		SSJ18 Sharath	"O Vennila"	P. Unnikrishnan	Vaali	A. R. Rahman	Kadhal Desam (1996)
24 March 2010	4		SSJ16 Srinisha	"Konjam Nilavu"	Annupamaa	Vairamuthu	A. R. Rahman	Thiruda Thiruda (1993)
24 March 2010	5	Malgudi Shubha	(chorus support)	"Nilaa Pongal"	Malgudi Shubha	Girish Puthenchery	Berny Ignatius	Thenmavin Kombath (1994)
25 March 2010	1		SSJ11 Nithyashree	"Iravu Nilavu"	S. Janaki, Karthik Raja, Yuvan Shankar Raja, Bhavatharini, Venkat Prabhu, Premji Amaran, Parthi Bhaskar & Hari Bhaskar	Vaali	Ilaiyaraaja	Anjali (1990)
25 March 2010	2	K. S. Chithra		"Azhagu Nilave"	K. S. Chitra	Vairamuthu	A. R. Rahman	Pavithra (1994)
25 March 2010	3		SSJ20 Shrikanth	"Nila Adhu Vanathumele"	Ilaiyaraaja	Ilaiyaraaja	Ilaiyaraaja	Nayakan (1987)
25 March 2010	4		SSJ02 Alka Ajith	"Paadu Nilaave"	S. P. Balasubrahmanyam & S. Janaki	Mu. Metha	Ilaiyaraaja	Udaya Geetham (1988)
25 March 2010	5		SSJ19 Roshan	"Nilaa Kaigirathu"	Harini	Vairamuthu	A. R. Rahman	Indira (2008)
25 March 2010	6		SSJ18 Sharath	Excerpt from "Sorgam Enbathu"	Srinivas & Swarnalatha	Vaali	Mahesh Mahadevan	Nammavar (1994)

=== Retro songs ===
- Compere: Divya
- Permanent voice trainer: Ananth Vaidyanathan
- Permanent judges: Mano and Malgudi Subha
- Performances:

The 29 March – 1 April round required the remaining eight contestants to sing songs of a retro theme.

– Special non-competitive performance
– Contestant granted immunity to advance to next round
– Contestant was in danger zone (bottom three)
– Contestant was eliminated

Air date	Order	Non-contestant performer	Contestant	Song	Original artist	Lyricist	Music director	Movie (year)
2010
2010		Mano, K. S. Chithra and Malgudi Shubha						
2010			SSJ19 Roshan	"Engeyum Eppodhum"	S. P. Balasubrahmanyam	Kannadasan	M. S. Viswanathan	Ninaithale Inikkum (1979)
2010			SSJ02 Alka Ajith	"Idhu Oru Nila"	S. Janaki	Kannadasan/Vairamuthu	Ilaiayaraaja	Tik Tik Tik (1981)
2010			SSJ11 Nithyashree					
2010			SSJ06 Prasanna Sundar					
2010			SSJ15 Shravan					
2010			SSJ16 Srinisha					
2010			SSJ16 Roshan					
2010			SSJ11 Priyanka					
2010			SSJ20 Shrikanth					
2010			SSJ20 Shrikanth					

=== Award-winning songs ===
- Compere: Divya
- Permanent voice trainer: Ananth Vaidyanathan
- Permanent judges: K. S. Chithra, Mano and Malgudi Subha
- Special guest judges: P. Susheela (6 April), S. Janaki (7–8 April)
- Performances:

The 5–8 April round required the remaining seven contestants to perform national award-winning songs. In the first part of the round, the best two performers, Srinisha and Shravan, were given an award by playback singer P. Susheela and immunity to advance to the next round. The other contestants sang another song on the theme; the worst of these three then had to perform state award-winning songs, and the worst two of those had to perform brand new songs. Nithyashree was ultimately the bottom performer, however special guest S. Janaki requested that no one be eliminated and the judges agreed.

– Special non-competitive performance

– Contestant granted immunity to advance to next round

– Contestant was in danger zone

Air date	Order	Non-contestant performer	Contestant	Song	Original artist	Lyricist	Music director	Movie (year)
5 April 2010	1		SSJ11 Nithyashree	"Paadariyen"	K. S. Chithra	Vairamuthu	Ilaiyaraaja	Sindhu Bhairavi (1985)
5 April 2010	2		SSJ19 Roshan	"Ennavale"	Unni Krishnan	Vaali & Vairamuthu	A. R. Rahman	Kaadhalan (1994)
5 April 2010	3		SSJ21 Priyanka	"Ovvoru Pookalume"	K. S. Chithra	Pa. Vijay	Bharadwaj	Autograph (2004)
5 April 2010	4	K. S. Chithra		Excerpt from "Ovvoru Pookalume"	K. S. Chithra	Pa. Vijay	Bharadwaj	Autograph (2004)
5 April 2010	5	K. S. Chithra		Excerpt from "Manjal Prasaadham" (Malayalam language)	K. S. Chithra	ONV Kurup	Bombay Ravi	Nakhakshathangal (1986)
5 April 2010	6	Ananth Vaidyanathan		Excerpt from "Dil Cheez Kya Hai" (Hindi/Urdu language)	Asha Bhosle	Shahryar	Khayyam	Umrao Jaan (1981)
6 April 2010
6 April 2010	1	P. Susheela		Excerpt from "Unnai Ondru Ketpen"	P. Susheela			
6 April 2010	2		SSJ02 Alka Ajith	"Naalai Indha Velai"	P. Susheela	Vaali	M. S. Viswanathan	Uyarndha Manidhan (1968)
6 April 2010	3		SSJ06 Prasanna Sundar	"Arupadai Veedu"	Sirkazhi Govindarajan	Kannadasan	K. V. Mahadevan	Kandan Karunai (1967)
6 April 2010	4		SSJ15 Shravan	"Thanga Thamarai Magale"	S. P. Balasubrahmanyam & Malgudi Subha	Vairamuthu	A. R. Rahman	Minsara Kanavu (1997)
6 April 2010	5	Mano (vocally supported by K. S. Chithra)		"Thooliyile Ada Vantha"	Mano & K. S. Chithra	Vaali	Ilaiyaraaja	Chinna Thambi (1991)
6 April 2010	6		SSJ16 Srinisha	"Chittukuruvi"	P. Susheela	Kannadasan	M. S. Viswanathan	Savaale Samali (1971)
7 April 2010
7 April 2010	1	S. Janaki		Excerpt from "Senthoora Poove"	S. Janaki	Gangai Amaran	Ilaiyaraaja	16 Vayathinile (1977)
7 April 2010	2		SSJ11 Nithyashree	"Inji Idupazhaga"	S. Janaki	Vaali	Ilaiyaraaja	Thevar Magan (1992)
7 April 2010	3		SSJ02 Alka Ajith	"Oru Dheivam Thantha Poove"	Chinmayi & P. Jayachandran	Vairamuthu	A. R. Rahman	Kannathil Muthamittal (2002)
7 April 2010	4		SSJ06 Prasanna Sundar	"Strawberry Kanne"	KK	Vairamuthu	A. R. Rahman	Minsara Kanavu (1997)
7 April 2010	5		SSJ21 Priyanka	"Paattu Solli Paada Solli"	Sadhana Sargam	Palani Bharathi	Ilaiyaraaja	Azhagi (2002)
7 April 2010	6		SSJ19 Roshan	"Pudhu Vellai Mazhai"	Unni Menon & Sujatha Mohan	Vairamuthu	A. R. Rahman	Roja (1992)
7 April 2010	7	S. Janaki		Excerpt from "Ooru Sanam"	S. Janaki	Gangai Amaran	Ilaiyaraaja	16 Vayathinile (1977)
8 April 2010	1		SSJ02 Alka Ajith	"Naadham En Jeevane"	S. Janaki	Vairamuthu	Ilaiyaraaja	Kaadhal Oviyam (1992)
8 April 2010	2		SSJ11 Nithyashree	"Kaadhal Yaanai"	Nakul, Melvin & G. V. Prakash Kumar	Na. Muthukumar	A. R. Rahman	Anniyan (2005)
8 April 2010	3		SSJ16 Srinisha	Excerpt from "Mayil Pola"	Bhavatharini	Na. Muthukumar	A. R. Rahman	Bharathi (2000)
8 April 2010	4		SSJ15 Shravan	Excerpt from "Kannal Pesum Penne"	S. P. Balasubrahmanyam	Vairamuthu	Vidyasagar	Mozhi (2007)
8 April 2010	5	S. Janaki & Mano		Excerpts from "Nilaa Kaayum Neram" & "Machana Paathingala"	S. Janaki & Mano	Vaali & Vairamuthu	Ilaiyaraaja & Sirpy	Chembaruthi (1992) & Nattamai (1994)
8 April 2010	6		SSJ19 Roshan	"Amma Endru"	K. J. Yesudas	Vaali	Ilaiyaraaja	Mannan (1992)
8 April 2010	7		SSJ11 Nithyashree	"Kaatril Enthan"	S. Janaki	Gangai Amaran	Ilaiyaraaja	Johnny (1980)
8 April 2010	8		SSJ19 Roshan	"Ninnu Kori"	K. S. Chithra	Vaali	Ilaiyaraaja	Agni Natchathiram (1988)

=== Chithirai Thiruvizha special ===
- Compere: Aishwarya
- Trainers & Permanent judges: Mano, K. S. Chithra and Malgudi Subha
- Performances:

The 12–15 April round celebrated Chithirai Thiruvizha. Instead of an elimination there was special prize for impressing the judges, who performed with them. Mano considered Alka Ajith was the most impressive, Malgudi Shubha considered Srinisha was the most impressive and Chithra considered Nithyashree the most impressive.

– Special solo performance by judge

Air date	Order	Permanent judge performer(s)	Contestant	Song	Original artist	Lyricist	Music director	Movie (year)
12 April 2010	1	Mano	SSJ21 Priyanka	"Mukkala"	A. R. Rahman, Mano & Swarnalatha	Vaali	A. R. Rahman	Kaadhalan (1994)
12 April 2010	2	Malgudi Shubha	SSJ06 Prasanna Sundar	"Subbammaa"	Manicka Vinayagam & Malgudi Shubha		Bharadwaj	Roja Kootam (2002)
12 April 2010	3	K. S. Chithra	SSJ15 Shravan	"Ithazhil Kathai"	S. P. Balasubrahmanyam & K. S. Chithra	Muthulingam & Pulamaipithan	Ilaiyaraaja	Unnal Mudiyum Thambi (1988)
12 April 2010	4	Malgudi Shubha	SSJ01 Alka Ajith	"Thulluvadho"	Malgudi Shubha	Vaali	Vijay Antony	Sukran (2005)
12 April 2010	5	Mano	SSJ19 Roshan	"Thendrale Thendrale"	Mano, Unni Krishnan & Dominique Cerejo	Vaali	A. R. Rahman	Kadhal Desam (1996)
13 April 2010	1	Mano	SSJ15 Shravan	"Malayaala Karaiyora"	Mano	Vaali	Ilaiyaraaja	Rajadhi Raja (1989)
13 April 2010	2	K. S. Chithra	SSJ19 Roshan	"Nee Oru Kaadhal"	Mano & K. S. Chithra	Pulamaipithan	Ilaiyaraaja	Nayakan (1987)
13 April 2010	3	Mano & K. S. Chithra		Excerpt from "Nee Oru Kaadhal"	Mano & K. S. Chithra	Pulamaipithan	Ilaiyaraaja	Nayakan (1987)
13 April 2010	4	Malgudi Shubha	SSJ16 Srinisha	"Poo Meedhu"	Malgudi Shubha	Pugazhendhi	Vijay Antony	Dishyum (2006)
13 April 2010	5	Mano	SSJ11 Nithyashree	"Onnu Rendu"	Uma Ramanan & Mano		M. S. Murali	Chithirai Pookkal (1991)
13 April 2010	6	K. S. Chithra	SSJ06 Prasanna Sundar	"Malargale"	Hariharan & K. S. Chithra	Vairamuthu	A. R. Rahman	Love Birds (1996)
14 April 2010	1	Malgudi Shubha	SSJ19 Roshan	"Mun Paniya"	S. P. Balasubrahmanyam & Malgudi Subha	Palani Bharathi	Yuvan Shankar Raja	Nandhaa (2001)
14 April 2010	2	Mano	SSJ02 Alka Ajith	"Sevvanam Chinna Penn"	Pallavi & Mano	Vairamuthu	A. R. Rahman	Pavithra (1994)
14 April 2010	3	K. S. Chithra	SSJ21 Priyanka	"Ninnu Kori"	K. S. Chithra	Vaali	Ilaiyaraaja	Agni Natchathiram (1988)
14 April 2010	4	Mano	SSJ06 Prasanna Sundar	"Thooliyile Aada Vantha"	Mano & K. S. Chithra	Vaali	Ilaiyaraaja	Chinna Thambi (1991)
14 April 2010	5	Mano	SSJ16 Srinisha	"Vedhaalam"	S. P. Sailaja & Mano	Ilaiyaraaja	Ilaiyaraaja	Soora Samhaaram (1988)
15 April 2010	1	K. S. Chithra	SSJ02 Alka Ajith	"Ovvoru Pookalume"	K. S. Chithra	Pa. Vijay	Bharadwaj	Autograph (2004)
15 April 2010	2	K. S. Chithra		Excerpt from "Mounamgane Yedagamani" (from Telugu language film)	K. S. Chithra	Chandrabose	M.M. Keeravani	Naa Autograph (2004)
15 April 2010	3	Malgudi Shubha	SSJ15 Shravan	"Thaiyya Thaiyya"	Sukhwinder Singh & Malgudi Subha	Vairamuthu	A. R. Rahman	Uyire (1998)
15 April 2010	4	K. S. Chithra	SSJ11 Nithyashree	"Othaiyila"	K. S. Chithra	Panchu Arunachalam	Ilaiyaraaja	Vanaja Girija (1994)
15 April 2010	5	K. S. Chithra		Excerpt from "Othaiyila"	K. S. Chithra	Panchu Arunachalam	Ilaiyaraaja	Vanaja Girija (1994)
15 April 2010	6	Malgudi Shubha	SSJ21 Priyanka	"All The Time"	Malgudi Shubha	Ilaiyaraaja	Ilaiyaraaja	Nadodi Thendral (1992)
15 April 2010	7	K. S. Chithra	SSJ16 Srinisha	"Kuzhaloodhum Kannanukku"	K. S. Chithra	Vaali	M. S. Viswanathan & Ilaiyaraaja	Mella Thirandhathu Kadhavu (1986)
15 April 2010	8	K. S. Chithra		Excerpt from "Chinna Kuyil Paadum"	K. S. Chithra	Vairamuthu	Ilaiyaraaja	Poove Poochooda Vaa (1985)

=== Unplugged round ===
- Compere: Divya
- Permanent voice trainer: Ananth Vaidyanathan
- Permanent judges: K. S. Chithra, Mano and Malgudi Subha
- Special guest musicians: Thumba Raja (percussionist), Selvaraj (strings) and Augustin (grand pianist) (19–20 April); Stephen Devassy (grand pianist), Thumba Raja (percussionist) and Selvaraj (strings) (21–22 April)
- Performances:

The 19–22 April round required the remaining seven contestants to perform songs in an "unplugged" format. The contestants were accompanied by special-guest musicians.

In relation to the musicians who made their TV debut appearance on the show, the compere announced that:

- the percussionist Thumba Raja had worked in the music industry for 30 years, and worked for several music directors including M. S. Viswanathan and Harris Jayaraj.
- Selvaraj had worked in the music industry for 35 years, and worked for about 75 music directors including A. R. Rahman and G. V. Prakash.
- the 18-year-old pianist, Augustin, was a child prodigy. He traveled to Europe to complete his musical studies at an early age, and after completing grade 8 of his piano examinations, completed his diploma at Trinity College London. He also trained under Murray McLauchlan.

The bottom three performers from the unplugged songs were given five minutes to learn another song before performing it. Based on those performances the judges eliminated Prasanna Sundar from the competition.

– Non-competition performance
– Contestant granted immunity to advance to next round
– Contestant was in danger zone
– Contestant was eliminated

Air date	Order	Non-contestant performer	Contestant	Song	Original artist	Lyricist	Music director	Movie (year)
19 April 2010	1		SSJ11 Nithyashree	"Malarendra Mugamondru"	L. R. Eswari & M. S. Raju	Kannadasan	Viswanathan–Ramamoorthy	Kadhalikka Neramillai (1964)
19 April 2010	2		SSJ06 Prasanna Sundar	"Maadi Mele"	P. B. Sreenivas	Kannadasan	Viswanathan–Ramamoorthy	Kadhalikka Neramillai (1964)
19 April 2010	3	Mano		Excerpt from "Kunguma Poove"				
19 April 2010	4		SSJ16 Srinisha	"Thulluvadho Ilamai"	T. M. Soundararajan & L. R. Eswari	Vaali	M. S. Viswanathan	Kudiyirundha Koyil (1968)
19 April 2010	5	Mano		"Then Sindhuthe"	S. P. Balasubrahmanyam & S. Janaki	Kannadasan	G. K. Venkatesh	Ponnukku Thanga Manasu (1973)
19 April 2010	6		SSJ02 Alka Ajith	"Unnai Kaanaadha Kannum Kannalla"	P. Susheela	Kannadasan	K. V. Mahadevan	Idhayak Kamalam (1965)
20 April 2010	1		SSJ15 Shravan	"Paaduvor Paadinaal"	T. M. Sounderarajan & P. Susheela	Kannadasan	M. S. Viswanathan	Kannan En Kadhalan (1968)
20 April 2010	2		SSJ19 Roshan	"Oru Pennai Paarthu Nilavai"	T. M. Soundararajan	Vaali	Viswanathan–Ramamoorthy	Dheiva Thaai (1964)
20 April 2010	3	Augustin (piano)		Instrumental (solo)				
20 April 2010	4		SSJ21 Priyanka	"Anubhavam Pudhumai"	P. B. Sreenivas & P. Susheela	Kannadasan	Viswanathan–Ramamoorthy	Kadhalikka Neramillai (1964)
20 April 2010	5	Malgudi Shubha		Excerpt from "Bésame Mucho" (Spanish song)				
21 April 2010	1		SSJ16 Srinisha	"Vennilaa Vennilaa"	Asha Bhosle	Vairamuthu	A. R. Rahman	Iruvar (1990)
21 April 2010	2		SSJ21 Priyanka	"Thoda Thoda"	S. P. Balasubrahmanyam & K. S. Chithra	Vairamuthu	A. R. Rahman	Indira (1995)
21 April 2010	3		SSJ19 Roshan	"Poi Solla Koodaadhu"	Hariharan & Sadhana Sargam		Vidyasagar	Run (2002)
21 April 2010	4		SSJ11 Nithyashree	"Vegam Vegam"	Usha Uthup	Vaali	Ilaiyaraaja	Anjali (1990)
21 April 2010	5		SSJ06 Prasanna Sundar	"Thendrale Thendrale"	Mano, Unni Krishnan & Dominique Cerejo	Vaali	A. R. Rahman	Kadhal Desam (1996)
21 April 2010	6	Mano		"Thendrale Thendrale"	Mano, Unni Krishnan & Dominique Cerejo	Vaali	A. R. Rahman	Kadhal Desam (1996)
22 April 2010			SSJ06 Prasanna Sundar					

=== Tribute to MSV ===
- Compere: Divya
- Permanent voice trainer: Ananth Vaidyanathan
- Permanent judges: Mano and Malgudi Subha
- Special guest judge: M. S. Viswanathan
- Performances:

The 26–29 April round required the remaining six contestants to perform songs from films that had the music director M. S. Viswanathan, a 55-year veteran of the industry. This was the last ordinary round before the semi-finals.

At the end of each episode's performances, the best-judged contestant was given immunity and advanced to the next round. Priyanka was eliminated.

– Non-competition performance
– Contestant won immunity and advanced to next round
– Contestant was in the bottom
– Contestant was eliminated

Air date	Order	Non-contestant performer	Contestant	Song	Original artist	Lyricist	Music director	Movie (year)
26 April 2010	1		SSJ15 Shravan	"Avalukku Enna"	T. M. Soundararajan & L. R. Eswari	Vaali	M. S. Viswanathan	Server Sundaram (1964)
26 April 2010	2		SSJ02 Alka Ajith	"Thedinen Vandhadhu"	P. Susheela	Kannadasan	M. S. Viswanathan	Ooty Varai Uravu (1967)
26 April 2010	3		SSJ21 Priyanka	"Partha Gnaabagam Illaiyo"	P. Susheela	Kannadasan	Viswanathan–Ramamoorthy	Puthiya Paravai (1991)
26 April 2010	4		SSJ11 Nithyashree	"Adi Ennadi Ulagam"	L. R. Eswari	Kannadasan	M. S. Viswanathan	Aval Oru Thodar Kathai (1974)
26 April 2010	5	M. S. Viswanathan & Malgudi Shubha		Excerpt from "Naan Paarthathilae"	T. M. Soundararajan & P. Susheela	Vaali	M. S. Viswanathan	Anbe Vaa (1966)
26 April 2010	6		SSJ19 Roshan	"Ennadi Raakamma"	T. M. Soundararajan	Kannadasan	M. S. Viswanathan	Pattikada Pattanama (1972)
26 April 2010	7		SSJ16 Srinisha	"Nenjathile Nee"	P. Susheela	Kannadasan	Viswanathan–Ramamoorthy	Shanthi (1965)
26 April 2010	8	Mano		Excerpt from "Kuttukoru"	Mano	Vaali	M. S. Viswanathan & Ilaiyaraaja	Senthamizh Pattu (1992)
29 April 2010			SSJ21 Priyanka					

== Finals ==
=== Semi-finals part one ===
- Compere: Divya
- Permanent voice trainer: Ananth Vaidyanathan
- Permanent judges: K. S. Chithra, Mano and Malgudi Subha
- Special guest musicians: Naveen Kumar (flautist), Vikram (percussionist), Mani (bass guitarist) and Shyam (pianist)
- Performances:

The semi-finals began with the 2–6 May round which required the remaining five contestants to perform in a quick-fire competition, accompanied by special guest musicians. Srinisha was eliminated.

– Non-competition performance
– Contestant won and advanced to next round
– Contestant was in the bottom two
– Contestant was eliminated

Air date	Order	Non-contestant performer	Contestant	Song	Original artist	Lyricist	Music director	Movie (year)
3 May 2010	1		SSJ02 Alka Ajith	"Sahana Saral"	Vijay Yesudas & Gomathishree	Vairamuthu	A. R. Rahman	Sivaji (2007)
3 May 2010	2		SSJ15 Shravan	"Ullathil Nalla"	Seerkazhi Govindarajan	Kannadasan	Viswanathan–Ramamoorthy	Karnan (1964)
3 May 2010	3	Mano	none (solo special)	"On Namaha"	S. P. Balasubrahmanyam & S. Janaki	Vaali	Ilaiyaraaja	Idhayathai Thirudathe (1989)
3 May 2010	4		SSJ11 Nithyashree	"Love Birds"	P. Susheela	Vaali	M. S. Viswanathan	Anbe Vaa (1966)
3 May 2010	5		SSJ16 Srinisha	"Iru Paravai"	Jency	Gangai Amaran	Ilaiyaraaja	Niram Maaratha Pookkal (1979)
4 May 2010	1		SSJ19 Roshan	"Anthi Mazhai"	S. P. Balasubrahmanyam & S. Janaki	Vairamuthu	Ilaiyaraaja	Raja Paarvai (1979)
4 May 2010	2		SSJ15 Shravan	"Engeyum Eppodhum"	S. P. Balasubrahmanyam	Kannadasan	M. S. Viswanathan	Ninaithale Inikkum (1979)
4 May 2010	3		SSJ11 Nithyashree	"Pallinginal Oru"	L. R. Eswari	Kannadasan	Veda	Vallavan Oruvan (1966)
4 May 2010	4		SSJ02 Alka Ajith	"Raajaavin Paarvai"	T. M. Soundararajan & P. Susheela	Vaali	M. S. Viswanathan	Anbe Vaa (1966)
4 May 2010	5		SSJ16 Srinisha	"Kaathodu Thaan"	L. R. Eswari	Vaali	V. Kumar	Velli Vizha (1972)
4 May 2010	6		SSJ19 Roshan	"Neela Vana Odaiyil"	S. P. Balasubrahmanyam	Vaali	Gangai Amaran	Vazhvey Maayam (1982)
5 May 2010	1		SSJ11 Nithyashree	"Aduthathu Ambujatha Pathela"	T. M. Soundararajan & P. Susheela	V. Kumar	M. S. Viswanathan & V. Kumar	Ethir Neechal (1968)
5 May 2010	2		SSJ15 Shravan	"Vennilavae"	Hariharan, Sadhana Sargam, Shankar Mahadevan & Kavita Paudwal	Vairamuthu	A. R. Rahman	Minsara Kanavu (1997)
5 May 2010	3		SSJ02 Alka Ajith	"Ninaikka Therindha"	P. Susheela	Kannadadasan	Viswanathan–Ramamoorthy	Anandha Jodhi (1963)
5 May 2010	4		SSJ16 Srinisha	"Yelantha Payam"	L. R. Eswari	Kannadasan	K. V. Mahadevan	Velli Vizha (1972)
5 May 2010	5		SSJ11 Nithyashree	"Aduthathu Ambujatha Pathela"	S. Janaki	Vaali	Ilaiyaraaja	Annakili (1976)
5 May 2010	6		SSJ19 Roshan	"Kaadhalin Dheepam Ondru"	S. Janaki & S. P. Balasubrahmanyam	Panchu Arunachalam	Ilaiyaraaja	Thambikku Entha Ooru (1984)
6 May 2010	1		SSJ02 Alka Ajith	"Anjali Anjali"	S. P. Balasubrahmanyam & K. S. Chithra	Vairamuthu	A. R. Rahman	Sivaji (2007)
6 May 2010	2		SSJ19 Roshan	"Mandram Vantha"	S. P. Balasubrahmanyam	Vaali	Ilaiyaraaja	Mouna Ragam (1986)
6 May 2010	3	Malgudi Shubha		Annie's Song				
6 May 2010	5		SSJ16 Srinisha	"Kunguma Poove"	J. P. Chandrababu & K. Jamuna Rani	Ku. Ma. Balasubramaniam	S. M. Subbaiah Naidu	Maragadham (1959)
6 May 2010	6		SSJ15 Shravan	"Madai Thiranthu"	S. P. Balasubrahmanyam	Vaali (originally Written by Manivannan)	Ilaiyaraaja	Nizhalgal (1980)
6 May 2010	7		SSJ16 Srinisha					

=== Semi-finals part two ===
- Compere: Divya
- Permanent voice trainer: Ananth Vaidyanathan
- Permanent judges: K. S. Chithra, Mano and Malgudi Subha
- Special guest judges & trainers: Nithyasree Mahadevan, Suchithra Karthik Kumar & Harish Raghavendra
- Performances:

The semi-finals concluded with the 10–13 May round which required the remaining four contestants to perform in another quick-fire competition. Each contestant was required to sing:

- a song in the Carnatic classical genre together with eminent Carnatic vocalist and playback singer Nithyasree Mahadevan;
- a song in the Western genre together with playback singer Suchithra Karthik Kumar; and
- a song in the Melody genre together with playback singer Harish Raghavendra.

The contestants received additional training from each of the above playback singers for this round, in addition to their usual training from Ananth Vaidyanathan. At the conclusion of the episode, Nithyashree was eliminated.

– Non-competition performance
– Contestant advanced as direct finalist
– Contestant was in the bottom two
– Contestant was eliminated

Air date	Order	Special guest performer	Contestant(s)	Song	Original artist	Lyricist	Music director	Movie (year)
10 May 2010	1	Nithyasree Mahadevan	SSJ11 Nithyashree	"Vaanathin Meethu" (sung as viruttam in the raga Mand)	Nithyasree Mahadevan	Ramalinga Swamigal		
10 May 2010	2	Nithyasree Mahadevan	SSJ11 Nithyashree	"Sowkiyamaa Kannae"	Nithyasree Mahadevan	Vairamuthu	A. R. Rahman	Sangamam (1999)
10 May 2010	3	Nithyasree Mahadevan	SSJ19 Roshan	"Vedam"	S. P. Balasubrahmanyam & S. P. Sailaja	Vairamuthu	Illayaraja	Salangai Oli (1983)
10 May 2010	4	Nithyasree Mahadevan	none (solo special)	"Pazham Neeyappa"	K. B. Sundarambal	Kannadasan	K. V. Mahadevan	Thiruvilaiyadal (1965)
10 May 2010	5	Suchithra Karthik Kumar	SSJ15 Shravan	"Something Something"	Tippu	Vairamuthu	Devi Sri Prasad	Something Something... Unakkum Enakkum (2006)
10 May 2010	6	Suchithra Karthik Kumar	SSJ11 Nithyashree	"X Machi"	Mathangi & Nakul	Vaali	Harris Jayaraj	Ghajini (2005)
11 May 2010	1	Harish Raghavendra	SSJ15 Shravan	"Pon Ondru Kanden"	T. M. Soundararajan & P. B. Sreenivas	Kannadasan	Viswanathan–Ramamoorthy	Padithaal Mattum Podhuma (1962)
11 May 2010	2	Harish Raghavendra	SSJ19 Roshan	"En Kadhalae"	S. P. Balasubrahmanyam & K. S. Chithra	Vairamuthu	A. R. Rahman	Duet (1994)
11 May 2010	3	Nithyasree Mahadevan	SSJ02 Alka Ajith	"Ezhu Swarangalukkul"	Vani Jayaram	Kannadasan	M. S. Viswanathan	Apoorva Raagangal (1975)
11 May 2010	4	Nithyasree Mahadevan	none (solo special)	Carnatic Tanam in raga Vasantha	Nithyasree Mahadevan	Nithyasree Mahadevan	Nithyasree Mahadevan	
11 May 2010	5	Nithyasree Mahadevan	SSJ15 Shravan	"Minsara Kanna"	Nithyasree Mahadevan & Srinivas	Vairamuthu	A. R. Rahman	Padayappa (1999)
12 May 2010	1	Suchithra Karthik Kumar	SSJ19 Roshan	"Manjal Veyil"	(Hariharan, Krish & Nakul)	Thamarai	Harris Jayaraj	Vettaiyaadu Vilaiyaadu (2006)
12 May 2010	2	Suchithra Karthik Kumar	SSJ02 Alka Ajith	"Rahathulla"	Annupamaa	Thamarai	Harris Jayaraj	Ghajini (2005)
12 May 2010	3	Ananth Vaidhyanathan	Shravan, Alka Ajith, Nithyashree & Roshan	Medley containing excerpts from "Om Namashivaya", "Samajavaragamana" & "Margazhi Poove"	S. Janaki & Shobha Shankar	Vairamuthu, Tyagaraja, & Vairamuthu	Illayaraja, K. V. Mahadevan & A. R. Rahman	Salangai Oli (1983), Sankarabharanam (1980) & May Madham (1994)
12 May 2010	4	Harish Raghavendra	SSJ11 Nithyashree	"Valaiosai"	S. P. Balasubrahmanyam & Lata Mangeshkar	Vaali	Ilaiyaraaja	Sathya (1988)
12 May 2010	5	Harish Raghavendra	SSJ15 Shravan	"Ithazhil Kathai"	S. P. Balasubrahmanyam & K. S. Chithra	Pulamaipithan, Muthulingam & Ilaiyaraaja	Ilaiyaraaja	Unnal Mudiyum Thambi (1988)
13 May 2010
13 May 2010	1	Suchithra Karthik Kumar	none (solo special)	Medley containing excerpts from "Excuse Me" & "Oru Chinna Thaamarai"	Suchitra	Viveka	Sri Devi Prasad & Vijay Antony	Kanthaswamy (2009) & Vettaikaaran (2009)
13 May 2010	2	Harish Raghavendra	none (solo special)	"Sakkarai Nilavae"	Harish Raghavendra	Vairamuthu	Mani Sharma	Youth (2002)
13 May 2010	3	none (60 second solo by contestant)	SSJ11 Nithyashree	Excerpt from "Naalaam Naalam"	P. B. Sreenivas & P. Susheela	Kannadasan	Viswanathan–Ramamoorthy	Kadhalikka Neramillai (1964)
13 May 2010	4	none (60 second solo by contestant)	SSJ19 Roshan	Excerpt from "Aval Oru Navarasa"	S. P. Balasubrahmanyam	Kannadasan	M. S. Viswanathan	Ulagam Sutrum Valiban (1973)
13 May 2010	5	none (60 second solo by contestant)	SSJ19 Roshan	Excerpt from "Sundari Kannal"	S. P. Balasubrahmanyam & S. Janaki	Vaali	Illayaraja	Thalapathi (1991)
13 May 2010	6	none (60 second solo by contestant)	SSJ11 Nithyashree	Excerpt from "Thendral Vanthu Theendumbothu"	Ilaiyaraaja & S. Janaki	Vaali	Ilaiyaraaja	Avatharam (1995)
13 May 2010	7	none (60 second solo by contestant)	SSJ11 Nithyashree	Excerpt from "Partha Gnaabagam Illaiyo"	P. Susheela	Kannadasan	Viswanathan–Ramamoorthy	Puthiya Paravai (1991)
13 May 2010	8	none (60 second solo by contestant)	SSJ19 Roshan	Excerpt from "Elangaathu Veesudhey"	Sriram Parthasarathy	Palani Bharathi	Ilaiyaraaja	Pithamagan (1995)

=== Wild card entry round ===
- Compere: Divya
- Permanent voice trainer: Ananth Vaidyanathan
- Wild card entry judges: Srinivas, Unni Menon, Madhu Balakrishnan, Sowmya and Annupamaa
- Performances:

The 17–20 May round allowed contestants who had been eliminated in fifteenth to sixth place in the main competition an opportunity to perform for a chance to re-enter the competition in the wild card round. (Eliminated semi-finalists were automatically entitled to perform in the public wild card round.) In the first part of this round, the wild card entry judges selected two contestants to advance to the public wild card round.

– Non-competition performance

– Top two contestants selected to advance to next round

– Top five contestants in this round

Air date	Order	Special guest performer	Contestant	Song	Original artist	Lyricist	Music director	Movie (year)
17 May 2010	1		SSJ06 Prasanna Sundar	"Minsara Kanna"	Nithyasree Mahadevan & Srinivas	Vairamuthu	A. R. Rahman	Padayappa (1999)
17 May 2010	2		SSJ18 Sharath	"Sangeetha Jaathi Mullai"	S. P. Balasubrahmanyam	Vairamuthu	Ilaiyaraaja	Kaadhal Oviyam (1982)
17 May 2010	3	Madhu Balakrishnan		"Bikshai Paathiram"	Madhu Balakrishnan	Ilaiyaraaja	Ilaiyaraaja	Naan Kadavul (2009)
17 May 2010	4		SSJ21 Priyanka	"Maraindhirundhu Paakum"	P. Susheela	Kannadasan	K. V. Mahadevan	Thillana Mohanambal (1968)
17 May 2010	5		SSJ17 Shrihari	"Maadhavi Ponmayilaal"	T. M. Soundararajan & P. Susheela	Vaali	M. S. Viswanathan	Iru Malargal (1967)
17 May 2010	6		SSJ08 Oviya	"Maseeya"	Mano & Mega	Vaali	Harris Jayaraj	Iru Malargal (2009)
18 May 2010
18 May 2010	1	Sowmya & Ananth Vaidyanathan; Srinivas; Annupamaa; Unni Menon; Madhu Balakrishnan; and final chorus		Medley consisting of alapana & Sloka in raga Dhwijavanthi; excerpt from "Azhage Sugamaa"; excerpt from "July Maadham"; excerpt from "Poomaalai Vaangi"; excerpt from "Pramadhavanam" & excerpt from "Panivilum Malarvanam"	Sowmya & Ananth Vaidhyanathan; Srinivas; K. J. Yesudas; S. P. Balasubrahmanyam	Vairamuthu, Vaali, & Kaithapram	A. R. Rahman, Ilaiyaraaja & Raveendran	Paarthale Paravasam (1999); Pudhiya Mugam (1993); Sindhu Bhairavi (1985); His Highness Abdullah (1990); Ninaivellam Nithya (1982)
18 May 2010	2		SSJ02 Srikanth	"Ulaga Nayakan"	Vinit Singh	Vairamuthu	Himesh Reshammiya	Dasavathaaram (2008)
18 May 2010	3		SSJ07 Sowmiya	"Ninaithu Ninaithu"	Shreya Ghoshal	Na. Muthukumar	Selvaraghavan & Yuvan Shankar Raja	7G Rainbow Colony (2004)
18 May 2010	4		SSJ09 Vishnucharan	"Kadhalikka Neramillai"	Sirkazhi Govindarajan	Kannadasan	Viswanathan–Ramamoorthy	Kadhalikka Neramillai (2004)
18 May 2010	5		SSJ04 Sahana	"Ennai Yenna"	Sudha Raghunathan	Vaali	Ilaiyaraja	Ivan (2002)
18 May 2010	6		SSJ03 Balasarangan	"Yaar Tharuvaar"	T. M. Soundararajan	Kannadasan	K. V. Mahadevan	Mahakavi Kalidas (1966)

- Compere: Divya
- Permanent voice trainer: Ananth Vaidyanathan
- Permanent judges: K. S. Chithra, Mano and Malgudi Subha
- Special guest judge: Sadhana Sargam
- Performances:

In the second part of the wild card entry round, 19–20 May, the remaining eight eliminated contestants were given another opportunity to perform. At the conclusion of this round, two more were selected to enter the public wild card round.

– Non-competition performance

– Contestant selected to advance to next round

–

Air date	Order	Special guest performer	Contestant	Song	Original artist	Lyricist	Music director	Movie (year)
19 May 2010	1		SSJ08 Oviya					
19 May 2010	2		SSJ17 Shrihari	"Neeye Unakku Endrum"	T. M. Soundararajan & M. Raju	Kannadasan	Viswanathan–Ramamoorthy	Bale Pandiya (1962)
19 May 2010			SSJ02 Srikanth	"Paatum Naane"	T. M. Soundararajan	Kannadasan	K. V. Mahadevan	Thiruvilaiyadal (1965)

=== Wild card round ===
- Compere: Divya
- Permanent voice trainer: Ananth Vaidyanathan
- Permanent judges: Mano and Malgudi Subha
- Special guest judges: Nithyasree Mahadevan and Unni Menon

The 24–27 May wild card round had the six wild card contestants compete for a chance to re-enter the competition. Over four episodes, they performed "mass entertainment" songs, "philosophical" songs, South Indian "folk" songs, and "challenging" songs. Throughout the week, the public were invited to vote for their favourite wild card contestants.

Air date	Order	Contestant	Song	Original artist	Lyricist	Music director	Movie (year)
27 May 2010	1	SSJ16 Srinisha	"Pazham Neeyappa"	K. B. Sundarambal	Kannadasan	K. V. Mahadevan	Thiruvilaiyadal (1965)
27 May 2010	2	SSJ20 Shrikanth	"Sangeetha Jaathi Mullai"	S. P. Balasubrahmanyam	Vairamuthu	Ilaiyaraaja	Kaadhal Oviyam (1982)
27 May 2010	3	SSJ17 Srihari	"Kangalum Kavipaaduthe"	Sirkazhi Govindarajan & Trichy Loganathan	Tanjore Ramaiah Das	P. Adinarayana Rao	Adutha Veettu Penn (1960)
27 May 2010	4	SSJ11 Nithyashree	"Pattathu Raani"	L. R. Eswari	Kannadasan	M. S. Viswanathan	Sivandha Mann (1999)
27 May 2010	5	SSJ21 Priyanka	"Mannavan Vanthanadi"	P. Susheela	Kannadasan	K. V. Mahadevan	Thiruvarutchelvar (1967)
27 May 2010	6	SSJ09 Vishnucharan	"Isai Kettaal"	T. M. Soundararajan	Kannadasan	M. S. Viswanathan	Thavaputhalvan (1972)

=== Wild card results ===
- Compere: Divya
- Permanent voice trainer: Ananth Vaidyanathan
- Permanent judges: Mano and Malgudi Subha
- Special guest: M. Balamuralikrishna

Special awards
Genre	Nominees	Winner
Classical	Shravan, Sahana, Sri Hari, Prasanna Sundar	Shravan, Sri Hari (special mention)
Entertainment	Nithyashree, Srikanth, Srinisha	Nithyashree
Folk	Vishnu Sharan, Oviya, Bala Sarangan	Bala Sarangan
Western	Nithyashree, Sharath, Sowmiya	Sowmiya
Melody	Priyanka, Roshan, Alka	Alka and Roshan
Most Progressive Singer	Priyanka, Bala Sarangan, Prasanna Sundar, Shravan	Prasanna Sundar and Priyanka
Most Popular	No nominees	Srikanth

The 31 May – 3 June round recognized contestants with the SSJ Awards and also announced the wild card winners – Srikanth and Nithyashree – who entered the finals along with Alka Ajith, Roshan and Shravan.

The wild card results created frustrations and disappointments among Vijay TV viewers citing that the public votes were manipulated and played no role in the results. Various blogs were very much in favour of the wild card winner as Priyanka followed by Srinisha. Views have been aired that Srikanth and Nithyashree though talented pose no competency to the other finalists in the final round.

=== Finals ===
The finals consisted of eight episodes telecast over two weeks, 7–16 June.

The finalists were required to perform songs of the Carnatic classical genre, the South Indian "folk" music genre, the Western melody genre, and a fast tempo song of a Western genre.

Genre	Alka	Shravan	Roshan	Nithyashree	Srikanth
Classical	Ennai enna seithai venkuzhale	Paatum Naan	Vanthaaal Maha	Kannodu Kanbathellam	Isai Thamizh
Folk	Raangi Rangamma	Thillangapadi	Uppu Karvadu	Kaathadi Pola Yendi	Veyilodu Vilayaadi
Western (melody)	Ithu Varai	Nee Marilyn Monroe	Azhagiya Cindrella	Jillenu Oru Kaathal	Nenjukkul Peithidum
Western (fast)	Mambo Maamiya	Oyaayiye Yaayiye	Girlfriend Venum	Kannum Kannum Nokia	Bumchikku Bumchikku

=== Grand finale ===
- Host: Sivakarthikeyan & Divya
- Chief Guests: Karthi and Amala
- Judges: M. S. Viswanathan, P. B. Sreenivas, Malaysia Vasudevan, Unni Menon, Nithyasree Mahadevan, Manikka Vinayagam, Prashanthini, Vinaya, Shwetha Mohan, Ramesh Vinayakam, Mahathi, Srinivas, K. S. Chithra, Mano, Malgudi Subha and Ananth Vaidyanathan
- Performances:

The grand finale was telecast live on 17 June 2010, and exceeded three hours. The five grand finalists were Shravan Pratap, Alka Ajith, Roshan Sebastin, Srikanth, and Nithyashree.

Sequence	Alka Ajith	Shravan	Roshan	Nithyashree	Srikanth
1	Singara Velane	Om Sivoham	Udhaya Udhaya	Mayya Mayya	Maadhavi Ponmayilal
2	Munbe Vaa	Uyirum Neeye	Oru Poiyavathu Sol	Ivaloru Ilangkuruvi	Namma Ooru Singaari

==== Grand finale results ====
The results of the competition and prizes awarded at the grand finale were as follows:

Name	Position	Prize
Alka	Title winner	A villa worth ₹25 lakhs (2.5 million rupees)
Shravan	First runner-up	A stylish car
Srikanth	Most-popular contestant	₹3 lakhs (300,000 rupees)
Nithyashree.J.J and Roshan	–	₹2 lakhs (200,000 rupees) each
Priyanka and Srinisha	–	₹1 lakh (100,000 rupees) each
