= Alka Ajith =

Indian playback singer

- Born: 11 July 1996 (age 30); Thalassery, India
- Origin: University of Madras
- Genre: playback singing
- Occupation: Singer
- Instruments: Vocalist

Alka Ajith is an Indian playback singer, best known for winning season 2 of Airtel Super Singer Junior, a Tamil language music competition reality TV show broadcast on Vijay TV. She was awarded the Jaycey Foundation Best Female Singer Award in 2017.

== Early life ==
Alka was born to M.P. Ajith Kumar and K. Sajitha kumari. Her paternal grandfather was a noted singer. Her father Ajith Kumar is a professional musician and organist, who runs Alka's orchestra, "Sangeeth Sagar". Alka first learnt music from her father. She studied in University of Madras in Chennai.

== Musical career ==
=== Early life ===
Alka gave her first public performance when she was two and half years old in 1999, where she sang the Hindi language song, "Soldier ... ... Soldier... ". In 2001, she won International UNESCO Club of Repalle (A.P) award and gold medal, and in 2002, she won the Rotary International achievement award and gold medal.

When she was four years old, she cut her first audio album, "I love my India". In 2003, Alka entered the Limca Book of World Records, and won the title "Bharatheeya Gourav Puraskar" in New Delhi. In 2003, she won the Sauparnika Theeram Mini Screen Award, and Thalassery Drishya Kala's A. T. Ummer Award.

Before reaching the age of seven, Alka had sung more than 5,000 songs, could sing in 11 languages, and has given more than 500 concerts across India.

=== Airtel Super Singer Junior ===
In 2010, Alka shot to fame after becoming the winner of Airtel Super Singer Junior (season 2), a Tamil language music competition reality TV show broadcast on Vijay TV. She regularly participated in the competition since 2009, and was crowned the winner of the competition.

She subsequently made appearances on Airtel Super Singer 3, and Airtel Super Singer Junior 4 as a guest performer.

=== Playback singing ===
Alka made her debut as a playback singer with the song, "Chirakengu" in the Malayalam language movie The Train starring Mammootty after being spotted by Srinivas during the grand finale of Airtel Super Singer Junior (season 2).

In 2008, her debut music album Chakkaramuthu was released, consisting of songs she sang at the age of 10.

Year	Film / Soundtrack	Language	Song	Music director
2011	The Train	Malayalam	"Chirakengu"	Srinivas
2011	Pathinettan Kudi Ellai Arambam	Tamil	"Konja Neram"	Saravanan Ganesh
2012	Thalsamayam Oru Penkutty	Malayalam	"Poovaaname"	Sharreth
2012	Kovalanin Kadhali	Tamil	"Mella Mella"	Bharathi K.
2012	Kovalanin Kadhali	Tamil	"Enge Selluven"	Bharathi K.
2012	Paagan	Tamil	"Poon Thendralai"	James Vasanthan
2013	Raja Rani	Tamil	"Chillena"	G. V. Prakash Kumar
2016	Deffedar	Malayalam	"Oorila Eerila"	Illayaraja
