= Thalsamayam Oru Penkutty =

- Film poster
- Directed by: T. K. Rajeev Kumar
- Written by: Sunny Joseph; Manuel George
- Starring: Nithya Menon; Shwetha Menon; Unni Mukundan
- Cinematography: Vinod Illampally
- Edited by: B. Ajithkumar
- Music by: Sharreth
- Production company: Reel 2 Reel Cine Productions
- Distributed by: Central Pictures
- Release date: 2 March 2012
- Country: India
- Language: Malayalam

Thalsamayam Oru Penkutty (A Girl On Live) is a 2012 Indian Malayalam-language satirical comedy drama film directed by T. K. Rajeev Kumar. The film stars Nithya Menon, Shweta Menon and Unni Mukundan in the lead roles.

== Cast ==
- Nithya Menon as Manjula Ayyappan a girl on live
- Shweta Menon as Zarina, Programme Head of Real TV
- Unni Mukundan as Suryan
- Sruthi Dileep as Priya
- Manianpilla Raju as Ayyappan, Manju's father
- K. P. A. C. Lalitha as a TV viewer
- Suraj Venjaramoodu as Young Business Man Shibulal
- Siddique as Real TV CEO Surendra Menon
- Tini Tom as Govindan congress party member
- Devichandana as Sakhavu Bhavani, a left sympathiser
- Hima Shankar as Viewer, Neethu
- Maya Moushmi as Advocate
- Vanitha Krishnachandran
- Baburaj as Thomas
- Binu Adimali as Kannan, the cameraman
- Shruthy Menon as Sandhya
- Kottayam Nazeer as himself (voice of cm)
- Kalabhavan Navas as Gymman
- Vinayakan as Alex
- Neena Kurup
- Harikeshan Thampi as TV audience
- Kochu Preman as Ajayan, Jogging Ammavan
- Vijayalakshmi as Jogging Ammavan wife
- Susheelan as Sundaran, the auto-rickshaw driver
- Baiju as SI Sathyaneshan
- Baiju as Drunkard
- Chembil Ashokan as Krishnankutty, Opposition leader
- Aziz as a man at Ayyappan's teashop
- Dinesh Panickar as Ananthapai
- Satheesh as a member of Thalsamayam Group
- Vivek Gopan as Poovalan Kannan
- K. Madhu as himself
- Subbalakshmi
- Sreekala as Minister's wife

== Soundtrack ==
No.	Title	Performer(s)	Length
1.	"Ponnodu Poovayi"	K.S.Chitra
2.	"Kannaram Thumbi"	Mano
3.	"Ente hridayathalam"	Madhu Balakrishnan, Jinsha K. Naanu
4.	"Poovaname"	Alka Ajith, Anand Aravindakshan
5.	"Oh Thingal Pakshi"	Palakkad Sreeram
6.	"Dhak Dhak"	Siyad.K
7.	"Ponnodu Poovayi"	K. J. Yesudas
8.	"Kannaram Thumbi"	Rajalakshmi

== Awards ==
Asianet Film Award

- 2012: Best Female Playback Singer - K. S. Chithra - Ponnodu Poovayi
