= Amutham Music =

American independent record label

- Founded: 2000
- Founder: Winston Panchacharam
- Genre: Carnatic
- Country of origin: U.S.
- Location: Nanuet, New York
- Official website: amuthammusic.com

Amutham Music is an independent record label based in Nanuet, New York. Founded by Winston Panchacharam in 2000, Amutham specialises in Carnatic music and Indian devotional music.

Sriranjani by Sudha Ragunathan was Amutham's first release. Although it was intended as a one-off to help raise Sudha Ragunathan's professional profile outside of India, it became such a success that Panchacharam decided to release a few more recordings.

== Artists ==
Other than Sudha Ragunathan, who is now Amutham Music's managing director, several other notable Carnatic musicians have released recordings with Amutham Music, including Nithyasree Mahadevan, S. Sowmya, and P. Unnikrishnan.

== Recordings ==
=== Thematic presentations ===
Panchacharam's vision for Amutham focused not so much on singers, but more on composers and themes. Early releases featured classic compositions by composers like Thyagaraja and Dikshithar, considered the Mozart and Beethoven of the Carnatic repertoire. Later releases moved onto more modern composers like Papanasam Sivan and Subramania Bharathiyar. One feature of these thematic presentations by Amutham Music is that no piece would be recorded by one artist and then re-recorded by another.

Other types of Amutham theme recordings have focused on a song's subject rather than composers. Amutham's top-selling CDs include "The Dance of Shiva" by Sudha Ragunathan, and "Ragam Vol. 1" by Nithyasree Mahadevan - the first of which popularises compositions of Lord Nataraja (the cosmic form of Shiva), while the latter album is made up of songs in which the governing raga is mentioned either at the beginning of the composition, or is the subject of the composition. Nithyasree Mahadevan's "Murugan Pamalai Vol. 1" similarly popularises compositions on Lord Muruga.

== See also ==
- List of record labels
