= The Train (2011 film) =

- Directed by: Jayaraj
- Written by: Jayaraj
- Produced by: Jayesh Kuttamath
- Starring: Mammootty; Jayasurya; Kota Srinivasa Rao; Sheena Chohan
- Cinematography: Sinu Sidharth
- Edited by: Vivek Harshan
- Music by: Srinivas
- Production company: Harvest Dreams
- Distributed by: Kuttamath films
- Release date: 27 May 2011
- Country: India
- Language: Malayalam

The Train is a 2011 Malayalam thriller film written and directed by Jayaraj, starring Mammootty, Jayasurya and Sheena Chohan. The film is based on the 11 July 2006 Mumbai train bombings. It was earlier titled as Track with Rahman. It was released on 27 May 2011, and received dubbed releases in Hindi and Tamil.

== Synopsis ==
The film is based on the 11 July 2006 Mumbai train bombings. The film is a take on the lives of Malayalee families affected by the bomb blasts. Mammootty plays a police officer who is a keen observer. Jayasurya plays a singer who travelled on one of the trains. The story involves bomb blasts in seven different railways (stations and on train).

== Cast ==
- Mammootty as Kedarnath
- Jayasurya as Karthik
- Sheena Chohan as Kedarnath's wife
- Anchal Sabharwal as Meera
- Sabitha Jayaraj as Raziya
- Jagathy Sreekumar as Joseph
- Sai Kumar as Haneefa
- Salim Kumar as Ramu
- Kota Srinivasa Rao as Yogesh Thivari
- Maala Parvathi as Meera's Mother
- Zeenath as Suhana's Mother
- Valsala Menon as Allu's Grandmother
- Charanpreet Singh as DJ Friend

== Soundtrack ==
The film's soundtrack contains 7 songs, all composed by Srinivas. Lyrics were by Rafeeq Ahamed and Jayaraj.

| # | Title | Singer(s) |
|---|---|---|
| 1 | "Chirakengu" (F) | Alka Ajith |
| 2 | "Chirakengu" (D) | Arvind Venugopal, Sharanya Sreenivas |
| 3 | "Ithile Varoo" (M) | Srinivas |
| 4 | "Ithile Varoo" (F) | Sujatha Mohan |
| 5 | "Ladki" | Srinivas, Hishaam, Maya Sreecharan |
| 6 | "Naavoru" | K. J. Yesudas, Latha Hentry, Sharanya Sreenivas |
| 7 | "O Saathiya" | Javed Ali |

== Production ==
The film was launched on by Kuttamath Films. The movie was completed in three schedules.
