= Super Singer T20 =

- Created by: Vijay TV
- Presented by: Divyadarshini (2012-2015)
- Country of origin: India
- No. of seasons: 2

Production
- Executive producer: Vijay TV
- Production locations: Chennai, Tamil Nadu
- Running time: approx.50-60 minutes per episode

Original release
- Network: Star Vijay
- Release: 12 November 2012 – 22 May 2015

Related
- Super Singer

Super Singer T20 (சூப்பர் சிங்கர் T20) is a 2012-2015 Indian Tamil-language reality television singing competition, which aired on Star Vijay. Former contestants from previous seasons of the Super Singer and Airtel Super Singer Junior shows were divided into 6 teams. 15 league matches were held where each team competed against the other five teams. 4 teams were selected for the knockout semi-finals, before the remaining 2 teams competed against each other in the finals. The show was hosted by Divyadarshini.

== Airtel Super Singer T20 ==
The show was powered by Bharti Airtel.

=== Teams ===
==== Innisai Indians (team colour: black) ("II") ====
The Innisai Indians team was captained by Airtel Super Singer 1 winner, Nikhil Mathew.

The contestants selected as members of the Innisai Indian team were:

Contestant	Gender	Previous appearance(s) before November 2012 on SS	Previous appearance(s) before November 2012 on SSJ
Nikhil Mathew (captain)	Male	SS season 1 (winner)	N/A
Raagini	Female	SS season 2	N/A
Priyanka	Female	N/A	SSJ season 2
Kaushik	Male	SS season 3	N/A
Madhumitha	Female	SS season 3	N/A
Jeyanth	Male	N/A	SSJ season 3
Haripriya	Female	N/A	SSJ season 3

==== Symphony Super Kings (team colour: yellow) ("SSK") ====
The Symphony Super Kings team was captained by Airtel Super Singer 3 winner, Saicharan.

Contestant	Gender	Previous appearance(s) before November 2012 on SS	Previous appearance(s) before November 2012 on SSJ
Saicharan (captain)	Male	SS season 3 (winner)	SSJ season 1 (runner up)
Nithyashree	Female	N/A	SSJ season 2
Sukanya	Female	N/A	SSJ season 3 (runner up)
Malavika	Female	SS season 3	N/A
Praveen	Male	SS season 3	N/A
Madhumitha	Female	SS season 3	N/A
Santhosh Balaji	Male	N/A	SSJ season 3

==== Harmony Heart Breakers (team colour: green) ("HHB") ====
The Harmony Heart Breakers team was captained by Airtel Super Singer (season 3) finalist, Pooja Vaidyanath.

Contestant	Gender	Previous appearance(s) before November 2012 on SS	Previous appearance(s) before November 2012 on SSJ
Pooja Vaidyanath (captain)	Female	SS season 3	N/A
Shravan	Male	N/A	SSJ season 2 (runner up)
Srikanth	Male	N/A	SSJ season 2
Srisha	Female	N/A	SSJ season 3
Akilesh	Male	N/A	SSJ season 3
Deepak	Male	SS season 3	N/A
Madhu R	Female	SS season 2	N/A

==== Rhythmic Royals (team colour: white) ("RR") ====
The Rhythmic Royals team was captained by Airtel Super Singer 3 finalist, Srinivas Raghunathan.

Contestant	Gender	Previous appearance(s) before November 2012 on SS	Previous appearance(s) before November 2012 on SSJ
Srinivas (captain)	Male	SS season 3	N/A
Sakthi	Male	SS season 3	N/A
Soundarya	Female	SS season 3	N/A
Balasarangan	Male	N/A	SSJ season 1 & SSJ season 2
Yazhini	Female	N/A	SSJ season 3
Rajaganapathy	Male	N/A	SSJ season 3
Anu	Female	N/A	SSJ season 3

==== Chennai Rock Stars (team colour: red) ("CRS") ====
The Chennai Rock Stars team was captained by Airtel Super Singer (season 3) second runner up, Santhosh Hariharan.

Contestant	Gender	Previous appearance(s) before November 2012 on SS	Previous appearance(s) before November 2012 on SSJ
Santhosh (captain)	Male	SS season 2 & SS season 3	N/A
Aajeedh	Male	N/A	SSJ season 3 (winner)
Dhanyasree	Female	SS season 3	SSJ season 1
Srinisha	Female	N/A	SSJ season 2
Roshan	Male	N/A	SSJ season 2
Mukund	Male	N/A	SSJ season 3
Sephy	Female	N/A	SSJ season 3

==== Blue Strings (team colour: blue) ("BS") ====
The Blue Strings team was captained by Airtel Super Singer (season 3) first runner up, Sathyaprakash.

Contestant	Gender	Previous appearance(s) before November 2012 on SS	Previous appearance(s) before November 2012 on SSJ
Sathyaprakash (captain)	Male	SS season 3 (runner up)	N/A
Krishna	Male	SS season 3	N/A
Malavika	Female	SS season 3	N/A
Anjana	Female	N/A	SSJ season 3
Gautham	Male	N/A	SSJ season 3
Rakshitha	Female	N/A	SSJ season 3
Allen	Male	N/A	SSJ season 3

=== Matches ===
==== Semifinals ====
Symphony super kings vs Innisai Indians and harmony heart breakers vs rhythmic royals.

Symphony superkings and harmony heart breakers qualified to the finals.

==== Finals ====
- Special Hosts: Ma Ka Pa Anand and Divyadarshini
- Special Judge: Sadhana Sargam
- Other Judges: Ananth Vaidyanathan, Malgudi Shubha, Mano, Vijay Yesudas, Vijay Prakash, Karthik, Suchitra Karthik Kumar, Madhushree

The finals consisted of a competitive match between Saisharan's Symphony Super Kings team and Pooja's Harmony Heartbreakers team.

With 1318 points, the team Symphony Super Kings team captained by Saisharan was crowned the winner of season 1 of the competition.

A celebration round was also broadcast in the week following the finals and prior to the commencement of season 3 of Airtel Super Singer Junior.

== Super Singer T20 season 2 ==
Season 2 of the show was powered by AVR Swarna Mahal Jewellery & PRAN Litchi Drink. Bharti Airtel did not return as sponsors of the show.

=== Show format ===
Each match consisted of a competition between two of the teams for the season. A match could be telecast over two or three episodes, and would require the teams to perform songs of a particular pre-selected theme.

Prior to the commencement of a match, a coin is tossed. The team who wins the coin toss will elect whether to perform first or second. The team's captains also would select in advance which performance from their team they believed was a jackpot performance.

Various solo and duet performances are given during each match, sometimes accompanied by other team members providing sound effects or chorus portions. The match concludes after the teams complete their group performances. Performances are scored after each category of performance is complete. The team who accumulates the highest score from each performance wins the match.

Each team competes against each other before the four top-scoring teams move through to the semi-finals, while the two lowest-scoring teams are eliminated. Two teams eventually move to the finals.

=== Teams ===
==== White Devils (team colour: white) ====
The White Devils team was captained by Airtel Super Singer (season 3) winner, Saisharan, and co-captained by Airtel Super Singer (season 4) runner up, Syed Subahan and season 3 finalist, Deepak.

Contestant	Gender	Previous appearance(s) before February 2015 on SS	Previous appearance(s) before February 2015 on SSJ
Saisharan (captain)	Male	SS season 3 (winner)	SSJ season 1 (runner up)
Syed (co-captain)	Male	SS season 4 (runner up)	N/A
Deepak	Male	SS season 3	N/A
Srinisha	Female	N/A	SSJ season 2
Nithyashree	Female	N/A	SSJ season 2
Gautham	Male	N/A	SSJ season 3
Saivignesh	Male	SS season 4	N/A
Haripriya	Female	N/A	SSJ season 3 & SSJ season 4
Shivani	Female	N/A	SSJ season 4

==== Dangaamaari (team colour: black) ====
The Dangamaari team was captained by Airtel Super Singer (season 4) winner, Diwakar, and co-captained by Airtel Super Singer (season 4) grand finalist, Sonia.

Contestant	Gender	Previous appearance(s) before February 2015 on SS	Previous appearance(s) before February 2015 on SSJ
Diwakar (captain)	Male	SS season 4 (winner)	N/A
Sonia (co-captain)	Female	SS season 4	N/A
Niranjana	Female	SS season 4	N/A
Aravindh Srinivas	Male	SS season 4	N/A
Rajaganapathy	Male	N/A	SSJ season 3
Monika	Female	N/A	SSJ season 4
Bharath	Male	N/A	SSJ season 4
Deepthi	Female	SS season 4	N/A
Azhagesan	Male	SS season 4	N/A

==== The Octaves (team colour: red) ====
The Octaves team was captained by Airtel Super Singer (season 3) international finalist, Pravin, and co-captained by Airtel Super Singer (season 3) contestant Koushik.

Contestant	Gender	Previous appearance(s) before February 2015 on SS	Previous appearance(s) before February 2015 on SSJ
Pravin (captain)	Male	SS season 3 (international finalist)	N/A
Koushik (co-captain)	Male	SS season 3	N/A
Aajeedh	Male	N/A	SSJ season 3 (winner)
Sharath Santhosh	Male	SS season 4	N/A
Anushya	Female	N/A	SSJ season 4 (Finalist)
Priyanka	Female	N/A	SSJ season 2
Dhanyashree	Female	SS season 3	N/A
Jeyanth	Male	N/A	SSJ season 3
Madhumitha R.	Female	SS season 3	N/A

==== Varuthapadatha Padagar (team colour: yellow) ====
The Varuthapadatha Padagar team was captained by Airtel Super Singer (season 1) winner, Nikhil Mathew, and co-captained by Airtel Super Singer (season 3) finalist Srinivas.

Contestant	Gender	Previous appearance(s) before February 2015 on SS	Previous appearance(s) before February 2015 on SSJ
Nikhil Mathew (captain)	Male	SS season 1 (winner)	N/A
Srinivas (co-captain)	Male	SS season 3	N/A
Madhumitha ("Madhu Iyer")	Female	SS season 3	N/A
Spoorthi	Female	N/A	SSJ season 4 (winner)
Rakshitha	Female	N/A	SSJ season 3
Vaijayanthi	Female	N/A	SSJ season 3
Akhilesh	Male	N/A	SSJ season 3
Madhumitha Shankar	Female	SS season 4	N/A
Nirjhari	Female	SS season 4	N/A
Narayanan	Male	SS season 4	N/A

==== Sangeetha Sarevedi (team colour: green) ====
The Sangeetha Sarevedi team was captained by Airtel Super Singer (season 3) runner-up, Sathyaprakash, and co-captained by Airtel Super Singer (season 3) finalist Pooja Vaidyanath.

Contestant	Gender	Previous appearance(s) before February 2015 on SS	Previous appearance(s) before February 2015 on SSJ
Sathyaprakash (captain)	Male	SS season 3 (runner-up)	N/A
Pooja Vaidyanath (co-captain)	Female	SS season 3	N/A
Shravan	Male	N/A	SSJ season 2 (runner-up)
Yazhini	Female	N/A	SSJ season 3
Srisha	Female	N/A	SSJ season 3 & SSJ season 4
Sherly	Female	SS season 4	N/A
Saishankar	Male	SS season 4	N/A
Ramesh	Male	SS season 4	N/A

==== The Loud Speakers (team colour: blue) ====
The Loud Speakers team was captained by Airtel Super Singer (season 2) & Airtel Super Singer (season 3) finalist, Santosh Hariharan, and co-captained by Airtel Super Singer (season 3) finalist Malavika.

Contestant	Gender	Previous appearance(s) before February 2015 on SS	Previous appearance(s) before February 2015 on SSJ
Santosh Hariharan (captain)	Male	SS season 2 & SS season 3 (finalist)	N/A
Malavika Sundar (co-captain)	Female	SS season 3	N/A
Soundarya	Female	SS season 3 & SS season 4	N/A
Shenbagaraj	Male	SS season 4	N/A
Vaishali	Female	SS season 4	N/A
Santosh Balaji	Male	N/A	SSJ season 3
Anu	Female	N/A	SSJ season 3
Krishnan	Male	SS season 4	N/A

=== Matches ===
Viewers were excited on hearing the news of the show returning for a second season, but expressed their disappointment with season 2 replacement host, rude commentary, as well as the presentation of the competition in the first few weeks.

==== League matches ====
Despite the initial negative reception, performances during the league matches which were memorable for viewers included:

Air date	Round	Team	Contestant(s)	Song	Original artist	Lyricist	Music composer/director	Source/Movie (year)
16 March 2015	M. S. Viswanathan Round	White (duet)	Sai Vignesh & Srinisha	"Malare Kurinji Malare"	K. J. Yesudas & P. Susheela	Vaali	M. S. Viswanathan	Dr. Siva (1975)
18 March 2015	M. S. Viswanathan Round	White (group performance)	Saisharan, Sai Vignesh, Syed, Gautham, Srinisha, Haripriya, & Shivani	Harmony Medley (excerpt from "Sonnadhu Needhana"; short alapana in raga Kiravani; excerpt from "Ninaipadhellam"; excerpt from "Ninaikka Therintha"; excerpt from "Mayakkamma" & excerpt from "Malarndhum Malaraadha")	P. Susheela; Saisharan; P. B. Sreenivas; P. Susheela; P. B. Sreenivas; T. M. Soundararajan & P. Susheela	Kannadasan	Viswanathan–Ramamoorthy	Nenjil Or Aalayam (1962); Traditional Carnatic music alapana; Nenjil Or Aalayam (1962); Anandha Jodhi (1963); Sumaithaangi (1962) & Pasamalar (1961)
18 March 2015	Ilaiyaraaja Round	Black (melody solo)	Sonia	"Thalattum Pongkaatru"	S. Janaki	Vaali	Ilaiyaraaja	Gopura Vasalile (1991)
23 March 2015	Western Round	Green (fast solo)	Pooja Vaidyanath	"Aila Aila"	Aditya Rao & Natalie Di Luccio	Madhan Karky	A. R. Rahman	I (2015)
23 March 2015	Western Round	Yellow (freestyle)	Srinivas	"Ennodu Nee Irundhaal"	Sid Sriram & Sunitha Sarathy	Kabilan	A. R. Rahman	I (2015)
26 March 2015	Folk Round	Blue (fast duet)	Santhosh Hariharan & Vaishaali	"Uppu Karuvadu"	Shankar Mahadevan & Kavita Krishnamurthy	Vairamuthu	A. R. Rahman	Mudhalvan (1999)
26 March 2015	Folk Round	Blue (freestyle)	Santosh Balaji (and team chorus)	"Raasaathi"	Shahul Hameed	Vairamuthu	A. R. Rahman	Thiruda Thiruda (1993)
27 March 2015	Folk Round	Blue (duet)	Soundarya & Malavika	"Othaiyile"	K. S. Chithra	Vaali & Panchu Arunachalam	Ilaiyaraaja	Vanaja Girija (1994)
27 March 2015	Folk Round	Blue (group performance)	Shenbagaraj, Santhosh, Malavika, Anu, Soundarya, Santosh Balaji & Vaishali	Performance Medley	various	various	various	various
31 March 2015	Post-2000 Songs Round	White (melody duet)	Haripriya & Saisharan	"Aaruyire Aaruyire"	Saindhavi Prakash Kumar & Sonu Nigam	Na. Muthukumar	G. V. Prakash Kumar	Madrasapattinam (2010)
31 March 2015	Post-2000 Songs Round	Blue (melody duet)	Santosh Hariharan & Anu	"Sahara Saral"	Vijay Yesudas & Gomathishree	Vairamuthu	A. R. Rahman	Sivaji (2007)
1 April 2015	A. R. Rahman Round	White (melody solo)	Saisharan	"Oru Poiyaavadhu Sol Kanne"	Hariharan	Vairamuthu	A. R. Rahman	Jodi (1999)
2 April 2015	A. R. Rahman Round	White (melody duet)	Srinisha & Sai Vignesh	"En Mel Vizhundha Mazhai Thuli"	K. S. Chithra & P. Jayachandran	Vairamuthu	A. R. Rahman	May Madham (1994)
2 April 2015	A. R. Rahman Round	White (fast solo)	Deepak	"Sandhi Kudhire"	Haricharan	Pa. Vijay	A. R. Rahman	Kaaviya Thalaivan (2014)
2 April 2015	A. R. Rahman Round	White (freestyle solo)	Haripriya	"Kalaarasigaa"	Swetha Mohan & Sharanya Srinivas	Vairamuthu	A. R. Rahman	Ambikapathy (2013)
3 April 2015	A. R. Rahman Round	Green (freestyle solo)	Shravan	"Minsara Kanna"	Nithyasree Mahadevan & Srinivas	Vairamuthu	A. R. Rahman	Padayappa (1999)
3 April 2015	A. R. Rahman Round	Green (fast duet)	Saishankar & Ramesh	"Senthamizh Naatu Thamizhachiye"	Shahul Hameed	Vairamuthu	A. R. Rahman	Vandicholai Chinraasu (1994)
3 April 2015	A. R. Rahman Round	Green (specified portions of group performance)	Shravan, Sathyaprakash, Saishankar, Sherly, Srisha, Yazhini	Harmony Medley (short alapana followed by excerpt from "Narumugaye"; jathis followed by short alapana in Maand; excerpt from "Anjali" followed by jathis)	various	Vairamuthu	A. R. Rahman	various
6 April 2015	1980 to 2000 Songs Round	Black (fast duet)	Niranjana & Bharath	"Hey Unnaithaane Nee Endha"	S. P. Balasubrahmanyam & S. Janaki	Vairamuthu	Ilaiyaraaja	Kadhal Parisu (1987)
7 April 2015	1980 to 2000 Songs Round	Black (melody duet)	Sonia & Aravind Srinivas	"Ai Rama"	Swarnalatha & Hariharan	Vairamuthu	A. R. Rahman	Rangeela (1995)
8 April 2015	1980 to 2000 Songs Round	Black (group performance)	Diwakar, Rajaganapathy, Sonia, Aravind, Niranjana, Deepthi & Bharath	Medley of songs specially arranged for black team by Ishaan Dev ("Thom Thom Chu"; Sonia's humming; excerpt from "Athini Sithini"; excerpts from "Maangalyam" and "Endrendrum Punnagai"; "baap baap")	("Athini Sithini" by Hariharan, Chitra Sivaraman & Kamal Haasan), ("Maangalyam" & "Endrendrum Punnagai" by Clinton Cerejo, Srinivas, Shankar Mahadevan & A. R. Rahman)	Vairamuthu	A. R. Rahman	Thenali (2000) & Alai Payuthey (2000)
8 April 2015	1960 to 1980 Songs Round	White (fast solo)	Deepak	"Sorgam Madhuvilae"	S. P. Balasubrahmanyam	Kannadasan	Ilaiyaraaja	Sattam En Kaiyil (1978)
8 April 2015	1960 to 1980 Songs Round	Yellow (fast solo)	Rizwan & dance by Narayanan (who later sang "Maadhavi Ponmayilaal")	"Naan Annai Ittal"	T. M. Soundararajan	Vaali	Viswanathan–Ramamoorthy	Enga Veettu Pillai (1965)
9 April 2015	1960 to 1980 Songs Round	White (melody duet)	Sai Vignesh & Srinisha	"Vizhiye Kathai Ezhudhu"	K. J. Yesudas & P. Susheela	Kannadasan	M. S. Viswanathan	Urimaikural (1974)
9 April 2015	1960 to 1980 Songs Round	White (freestyle)	Saisharan	"Paatum Naane"	T. M. Soundararajan	Kannadasan	K. V. Mahadevan	Thiruvilaiyadal (1965)
9 April 2015	1960 to 1980 Songs Round	White (fast duet)	Shivani & Syed	"Kettukodi Uruvi Melam"	T. M. Sounderarajan & L. R. Eswari	Kannadasan	M. S. Viswanathan	Pattikada Pattanama (1968)
10 April 2015	1960 to 1980 Songs Round	White (melody solo)	Haripriya	"Andha Sivagami"	P. Susheela	Kannadasan	R. Govardhanam	Pattanathil Bhootham (1967)
10 April 2015	1960 to 1980 Songs Round	White (group performance)	Srinisha, Syed, Haripriya, Saicharan, Saivignesh, Deepak, & Shivani	Harmony Medley (excerpts from "Paruvame Pudhiya Paadal" & "Uravugal Thodarkathai")	S. P. Balasubrahmanyam & S. Janaki; K. J. Yesudas	Panchu Arunachalam & Gangai Amaran	Ilaiyaraaja	Nenjathai Killathe (1980) & Aval Appadithan (1979)
10 April 2015	1960 to 1980 Songs Round	Yellow (group performance)	Narayanan, Rakshitha, Nikhil Mathew, Srinivas, Madhumitha & Madhu	Harmony Medley (Excerpts from "Avalukenna Azhagiya"; "Paadatha Paattellaam"; "Nadodi Nadodi"; & "Nalladhoru Kudumbam")	T. M. Soundararajan (TMS) & L. R. Eswari (LRE); P. B. Sreenivas (PBS) & S. Janaki; TMS, P. Susheela, A. L. Raghavan & LRE; PBS; TMS & P. Susheela	Vaali; Kannadasan; Vaali; Kannadasan; Kannadasan	Viswanathan–Ramamoorthy (V-R); V-R; M. S. Viswanathan (MSV); V-R; MSV	Server Sundaram (1964); Veerathirumagan (1962); Anbe Vaa (1966); Sumaithaangi (1962); & Thangapathakkam (1974)
13 April 2015	Kamal Haasan Songs Round	Red (fast duet)	Jeyanth & Dhanyashree	"En Jodi Manja Kuruvi"	S. P. Balasubrahmanyam, S. P. Sailaja, K. S. Chithra & Gangai Amaran	Gangai Amaran	Ilaiyaraaja	Vikram (1986)
15 April 2015	Kamal Haasan Songs Round	Green (melody duet)	Yazhini & Saishankar	"Maarugo Maarugo Maarugayi"	Kamal Haasan & K. S. Chithra	Vaali	Ilaiyaraaja	Vetri Vizha (1989)
15 April 2015	Kamal Haasan Songs Round	Red (specified 27% of group performance)	Kaushik, Priyanka, Dhanya, Sharath, Aajith, Anusya & Jeyant	Harmony Medley ("Ninaivo Oru Paravai" portion)	Kamal Haasan & S. Janaki	Vaali	Ilaiyaraaja	Sathi Leelavathi (1995)
16 April 2015	Rajinikanth Songs Round	Red (melody duet)	Kaushik & Madhumitha	"Nilave Mugam"	S. P. Balasubrahmanyam & S. Janaki	Vaali & R. V. Udayakumar	Ilaiyaraaja	Ejamaan (1993)
17 April 2015	Rajinikanth Songs Round	Blue (group performance)	Santhosh, Shenbagaraj, Santhosh Balaji, Vaishali, Malavika, Anu, & Soundarya	Performance Medley arranged by Santhosh Balaji	various	various	various	various
20 April 2015	TMS, PBS & Susheela Songs Round	Yellow (melody solo)	Madhumitha S. ("Madhu Iyer")	"Vasanthathil Oru Naal"	P. Susheela	Kannadasan	M. S. Viswanathan	Moondru Deivangal (1971)
21 April 2015	TMS, PBS & Susheela Songs Round	Yellow (freestyle)	Spoorthi	"Mannavan Vanthanadi"	P. Susheela	Kannadasan	K. V. Mahadevan	Thiruvarutchelvar (1967)
21 April 2015	TMS, PBS & Susheela Songs Round	Blue (melody duet)	Vaishali & Krishnan (whistling by Shenbagaraj)	"Neerodum Vaigaiyile"	P. Susheela & T. M. Soundararajan	Kannadasan	Viswanathan–Ramamoorthy	Paar Magale Paar (1963)
21 April 2015	TMS, PBS & Susheela Songs Round	Yellow (melody duet)	Rakshitha	"Iravum Nilavum"	P. Susheela & T. M. Soundararajan	Kannadasan	Viswanathan–Ramamoorthy	Karnan (1964)
21 April 2015	TMS, PBS & Susheela Songs Round	Yellow (fast solo)	Akhilesh	"Pudhiya Vaanam"	T. M. Soundararajan	Vaali	M. S. Viswanathan	Anbe Vaa (1966)
22 April 2015	TMS, PBS & Susheela Songs Round	Yellow (group performance)	Vaijayanthi, Rakshitha, Madhu Iyer, Spoorthi, Akhilesh, Nikhil Mathew, & Rizwan	Medley	various including excerpt from The Pink Panther Theme	various	various	various
23 April 2015	SPB & Janaki Songs Round	Black (melody solo)	Monika	"Raasave Unna Nambi"	S. Janaki	Vairamuthu	Ilaiyaraaja	Muthal Mariyathai (1985)
23 April 2015	SPB & Janaki Songs Round	Black (fast duet)	Niranjana & Aravind	"Kaakki Sattai"	S. Janaki & S. P. Balasubrahmanyam	Avinash Mani	Ilaiyaraaja	Kaakki Sattai (1985)
24 April 2015	SPB & Janaki Songs Round	Black (freestyle)	Sonia	"Vaidhegi Raman"	S. Janaki	Gangai Amaran	Ilaiyaraaja	Pagal Nilavu (1985)
24 April 2015	SPB & Janaki Songs Round	Blue (specified 58% of group performance)	Krishnan, Vaishali, Soundarya, Anu, Shenbagaraj, Santhosh Balaji, & Malavika	Medley (excerpt portions from "Sundari Kannal", "Santhana Kaatre", & "Oh Vasantha")	S. P. Balasubrahmanyam & S. Janaki	Vaali; Vaali; Pulamaipithan	Ilaiyaraaja	Thalapathi (1991), Thanikattu Raja (1982), & Neengal Kettavai (1984)
24 April 2015	SPB & Janaki Songs Round	Black (group performance)	Diwakar, Sonia, Deepthi, Niranjana, Bharath, & Aravind	Harmony Medley (excerpts from "Nenjinile Nenjinile"; "Panivizhum Iravu"; "Sippi Irukkuthu"; "Vanithamani..."; & "Thakita Thadhimi")	S. Janaki & S. P. Balasubrahmanyam	Vairamuthu; Vaali; Kannadasan; Vairamuthu; Vairamuthu	A. R. Rahman; Ilaiyaraaja; M. S. Viswanathan;	Uyire (1998); Mouna Ragam (1986); Varumayin Niram Sivappu (1980); Vikram (1986); Salangai Oli (1983)
27 April 2015	Post-2001 Songs Round	Red (fast solo)	Jeyanth	"Puli Urumudhu"	Ananthu Narayanan & Mahesh Vinayakram	Kabilan	Vijay Antony	Vettaikaaran (2009)
27 April 2015	Post-2001 Songs Round	Red (melody duet)	R. Madhumitha & Sharath Santhosh	"Urugudhe Maragudhe"	Shreya Ghoshal & Shankar Mahadevan	Na. Muthukumar	G. V. Prakash Kumar	Veyil (2006)
27 April 2015	Post-2001 Songs Round	White (melody solo)	Haripriya	"Vizhiyilae"	K. S. Chithra	Palani Bharathi	G. V. Prakash Kumar	Velli Thirai (2007)
28 April 2015	Post-2001 Songs Round	White (fast duet)	Nithyashree & Shivani	"Kaal Mulaitha Poovae"	Javed Ali & Mahalakshmi Iyer	Madhan Karky	Harris Jayaraj	Maattrraan (2012)
28 April 2015	Post-2001 Songs Round	White (freestyle)	Saicharan	"Unakkena Iruppaen"	Haricharan	Na. Muthukumar	Joshua Sridhar	Kaadhal (2004)
28 April 2015	Post-2001 Songs Round	Red (freestyle)	Koushik	"Aariro"	Haricharan	Na. Muthukumar	G. V. Prakash Kumar	Deiva Thirumagal (2011)
28 April 2015	Post-2001 Songs Round	White (group performance)	Saicharan, Syed, Deepak, Srinisha, Nithyashree & Haripriya	A cappella Harmony (high risk with no lyrics)	various	no lyrics	various	various
29 April 2015	Mani Ratnam Songs Round	Black (freestyle)	Niranjana	"Adiye"	Sid Sriram	Madhan Karky	A. R. Rahman	Kadal (2013)
30 April 2015	Mani Ratnam Songs Round	Green (fast solo)	Shravan	"Kootathilae Kovil Puraa"	S. P. Balasubrahmanyam	Muthulingam	Ilaiyaraaja	Idaya Kovil (1985)
30 April 2015	Mani Ratnam Songs Round	Black (fast duet)	Sonia & Bharath	"Veerapandi Kotayyile"	K. S. Chithra, Unni Menon & Mano	Vairamuthu	A. R. Rahman	Thiruda Thiruda (1993)
30 April 2015	Mani Ratnam Songs Round	Black (group performance)	Aravind, Sonia, Niranjana, Deepthi, Bharath, & Rajaganapathy (voice breaking now)	Medley (excerpts from "Rakkama Kaiya Thattu"; "Rukkumani"; "Kuchi Kuchi"; & "Hamma Hamma")	SPB & Swarnalatha ("Sw"); SPB & Chithra; Hariharan, Sw, G. V. Prakash & Sharadha; Suresh Peters & Sw	Vaali; Vairamuthu; Vairamuthu; Vairamuthu	Ilaiyaraaja; A. R. Rahman; A. R. Rahman; A. R. Rahman	Thalapathi (1991); Roja (1992); Bombay (1995); Bombay (1995)
5 May 2015	Quarter-finals 2 Round	Red (freestyle)	Anushya (best backing vocals: Dhanyashree & Priyanka)	"Kannodu Kanbathellam"	Nithyasree Mahadevan	Vairamuthu	A. R. Rahman	Jeans (1998)
5 May 2015	Quarter-finals 2 Round	Yellow (freestyle)	Narayanan	"O Sukumari"	Shankar Mahadevan & Harini	Vairamuthu	Harris Jayaraj	Anniyan (2005)
6 May 2015	Quarter-finals 2 Round	Red (best melody solo)	Koushik (best backing vocals: Aajith, Dhanya & Priyanka)	"Anbe Anbe"	Hariharan & Anuradha Sriram	Vairamuthu	A. R. Rahman	Jeans (1998)
6 May 2015	Quarter-finals 2 Round	Red (group performance)	Priyanka, Dhanyashree, Aajeedh, Koushik, Praveen, Jeyanth, & Anushya	Medley (excerpts from "Please Sir"; & "Maro Maro ("Break The Rules")"	Kunal Ganjawala, Benny Dayal, Clinton Cerejo, S. P. B. Charan & Chinmayi; George, Anupama, Sunitha Sarathy & Karthik	Vaali	A. R. Rahman	Boys (2003)
6 May 2015	Quarter-finals 2 Round	Yellow (specified 33% group performance)	Madhu, Nikhil, Srinivas, Narayanan, Rakshitha, Akhilesh, & Spoorthi	(short alapana followed by excerpt from "Kollayile Thennai")	P. Jayachandran	Vairamuthu	A. R. Rahman	Kaadhalan (1994)
7 May 2015	Semi-final Celebration Round	Black (melody duet)	Niranjana & Sonia	short alapana followed by "Kannukkul Pothivaippen"	Niranjana, Sadhana Sargam, Charulatha Mani, Vijay Prakash & Dr. R. Ganesh	Parvathy	M. Ghibran	Thirumanam Ennum Nikkah (2014)

==== Semifinals ====
Four teams qualified for the semi-finals:

1. White Devils vs Dangaamaari (Black) - won by White Devils.
2. The Red Octaves vs The Loud Speakers (Blue) - won by Loud Speakers.

The non-group performances in the semi-finals unusually featured a medley of two songs at a time (instead of sticking to the preferred one-song format). Memorable performances for viewers included:

Air date	Round	Team	Contestant(s)	Song	Original artist	Lyricist	Music composer/director	Source/Movie (year)
11 May 2015	Semi-finals Round 1	White (fast solo)	Nithyashree	portion of "Yaaradi Nee Mohini"	various	Ku. Ma. Balasubramaniam	G. Ramanathan	Uthama Puthiran (1958)
11 May 2015	Semi-finals Round 1	White (melody duet)	Sai Vignesh & Srinisha	portion of "Iravum Nilavum"	T. M. Soundararajan & P. Susheela	Kannadasan	Viswanathan–Ramamoorthy	Karnan (1964)
12 May 2015	Semi-finals Round 1	Black (melody duet)	Sonia & Monika	portion of "Nathiyil Aadum"	various	Vairamuthu	Ilaiyaraaja	Kaadhal Oviyam (1982)
12 May 2015	Semi-finals Round 1	Black (fast duet)	Diwakar & Niranjana	portion of "Manmadha Maasam"	Shankar Mahadevan & Nithyasree Mahadevan	Vaali	A. R. Rahman	Paarthale Paravasam (2001)
12 May 2015	Semi-finals Round 1	White (freestyle)	Saisharan	improvisation in ragas Vasantha & Hamsanandhi; "Vandhanam En"; and "Kandaen Kandaen"	Saisharan; S. P. Balasubrahmanyam; Karthik & Swetha Mohan	Traditional Carnatic music improvisation; Vaali; & Yugabharathi	Saisharan; Gangai Amaran; & Vidyasagar	Traditional Carnatic music improvisation; Vazhvey Maayam (1982); & Pirivom Santhippom (2008)
13 May 2015	Semi-finals Round 1	Red (solo)	Jeyanth	portion of "Senthamizh Then"	T. R. Mahalingam	Kannadasan	Viswanathan–Ramamoorthy	Maalayitta Mangai (1958)
14 May 2015	Semi-finals Round 1	Red (melody duet)	Anushya & Koushik	portion of "Mullai Malar Mele"	P. Susheela & T. M. Soundararajan	Kannadasan	G. Ramanathan	Uthama Puthiran (1958)
14 May 2015	Semi-finals Round 1	Red (freestyle)	Sharath Santhosh	"Oru Pennai"; & "Sandhi Kudhire"	T. M. Soundararajan; & Haricharan	Vaali; & Pa. Vijay	Viswanathan–Ramamoorthy; & A. R. Rahman	Dheiva Thaai (1964); & Kaaviya Thalaivan (2014)
14 May 2015	Semi-finals Round 1	Blue (freestyle)	Malavika	portion of "Vadhaname Chandhra Bimbamo"	M. K. Thyagaraja Bhagavathar	Papanasam Sivan	Papanasam Sivan	Sivakavi (1943)
15 May 2015	Semi-finals Round 1	Red (melody solo)	Priyanka (backing by Koushik)	portion of "Snehithane Snehithane"	Sadhana Sargam	Vairamuthu	A. R. Rahman	Alai Payuthey (2000)
15 May 2015	Semi-finals Round 1	Blue (group performance)	Krishnan, Santhosh Balaji, Shenbagaraj, Malavika, Anu, & Santhosh Hariharan	Musical drama (particularly portions of "Kaayadha Kaanagatthe...Mevaadha Maan"; "Vaanga Makka"; "Thanga Jariga"; & "Podhuvaaga")	TRM; Haricharan & Dr. Narayanan; TMS, P. Susheela, and S. C. Krishnan; Malaysia Vasudevan	Kannadasan; Na. Muthukumar; Kannadasan; & Panchu Arunachalam	T. Rajagopala Sarma & R. Sudharsanam; A. R. Rahman; K. V. Mahadevan; & Ilaiyaraaja	Sri Valli (1945); Kaaviya Thalaivan (2014); Navarathiri (1964); & Murattu Kaalai (1980)

==== Finals ====
- Special Host: Ma Ka Pa Anand
- Special Guest Musician: Rajhesh Vaidhya (veena)
- Special Judges: Sunitha Sarathy, S. P. Charan, and Shweta Mohan
- Other Judges: Karthik, Ananth Vaidyanathan, James Vasanthan, and Shalini

The finals consisted of a competitive match between the White Devils team, captained by season 1 winning captain Saisharan, and the Loud Speakers team captained by Santosh Hariharan. The teams were required to deliver performances across three genres during the week - being Carnatic classical music genre, western music genre, and folk music genre.

With the return of TV anchor-turned-popular actor Ma Ka Pa Anand as a special host, electric veena exponent Rajhesh Vaidhya as a special guest musician, and noteworthy comments from special judges Sunitha Sarathy & S. P. Charan, viewers responded positively to the finals which were telecast on Vijay TV from 18 May 2015.

The outcome of the finals was announced in the episode aired on 22 May 2015, and was well received by viewers. Saisharan's "White Devils" team was crowned the title winner of the competition after delivering outstanding performances during the finals and throughout the competition. Prize money was awarded to both teams, courtesy of the show's sponsors, with the winning team receiving 3 lakh rupees, and the runner up team receiving 2 lakh rupees.

== See also ==
- Super Singer
- Super Singer Junior
