= Super Singer 3 =

- Season 3
- Presented by: Divya and Sivakarthikeyan
- Judges: Srinivas, Sujatha Mohan, Unnikrishnan

Release
- Original network: STAR Vijay
- Original release: 12 July 2010 – 23 September 2011

Season chronology
- ← Previous; Super Singer 2 Next → Super Singer 4

Airtel Super Singer 3 – Thamizhagathil Brahmaanda Kuralukkaana Thedal – Immurai Ulaga Alavil, the third season of the Airtel Super Singer show, was a reality-based Indian singing competition in Tamil language that aired on Vijay TV. It was designed to be a talent hunt to find the best voice of Tamil Nadu. The show premiered on 12 July 2010, and episodes were telecast between Monday to Thursday each week at 9:00 pm. Persons above the age of 16 years were permitted to audition to showcase their talent on Vijay TV's platform.

The show was initially hosted by Divya Vijayagopal during the audition rounds. For the performance rounds by the top 25 contestants, voice trainer Ananth Vaidyanathan appeared fairly regularly on the show together with permanent judges Srinivas, Sujatha Mohan, P. Unnikrishnan, and hosts Divya Vijayagopal and Sivakarthikeyan. The hosts in each episode of the top 25 performance rounds announced that the winner would win a triple bedroom apartment worth Rs.3.7 million from its season 3 sponsor, Arun Excello Temple Green Township.

Special guest judges or guest performers who appeared on the show during the season consisted of a variety of eminent playback singers and music directors, including P. B. Sreenivas, P. Susheela, M. S. Viswanathan, S. Janaki, Unni Menon, Sadhana Sargam, S. P. Sailaja, Ranina Reddy, Nithyasree Mahadevan, Suchithra, Sriram Parthasarathy, Harish Raghavendra, Sangeetha Rajeshwaran, Madhu Balakrishnan, Karthik, Ramya NSK, Pushpavanam Kuppuswamy, Vinaya Karthik Rajan, Sowmya, Pop Shalini, as well as stars from the junior version of the show, such as permanent judges Mano and Malgudi Subha, and former contestants Anitha Karthikeyan, Ajeesh, and Alka Ajith.

== Auditions ==
Auditions commenced on 27 June 2010, and took place in Chennai, Coimbatore, and Trichy. Ground level auditions were telecast from 12 July 2010. Preliminary round auditions were telecast from 16 August 2010.

A total of 78 contestants were selected from Chennai, 58 contestants were selected from Coimbatore, and 41 were selected from Trichy to advance to the preliminary auditions.

=== Open auditions in Tamil Nadu ===
The ground level auditions were judged by Dr. Lavanya, Suvi Suresh, J.K.V.Roshni, as well as former contestants of Airtel Super Singer, being Anitha, Ajeesh and Ravi.

Open auditions were held across Tamil Nadu.

Episode #	Title	Audition Judges	Original release date
1, 2, 3, 4	"Chennai Auditions (first round)"	S. P. Sailaja, Unni Menon, Pop Shalini or Sowmya	12 July 2010 – 15 July 2010
First round auditions which were held in Chennai required auditioning contestants to perform a song before a single audition judge. Contestants were either spot-selected, rejected, or wait-listed until the conclusion of the round. Host Divya announced that about 700 contestants auditioned during this round, and about 200 contestants were selected to advance to the second round.
5, 6, 7, 8	"Chennai Auditions (second round)"	S. P. Sailaja and Sowmya, or Unni Menon and Pop Shalini	19 July 2010 – 22 July 2010
Second round auditions held in Chennai required auditioning contestants to perform a song before a panel of two audition judges. Contestants were either spot-selected, rejected, or wait-listed until the conclusion of the round. Selected contestants advanced to preliminary auditions. This round was hosted by former contestants Ajeesh and Raginishri, with a brief word from Divya at the commencement and conclusion of each episode.
9	"Coimbatore Auditions (first round)"	Nikhil Mathew, Ajeesh, or Krishna Iyer	26 July 2010 – 29 July 2010
First round auditions held in Coimbatore required auditioning contestants to perform a song or two before a single audition judge. Contestants were either spot-selected, rejected, or wait-listed until the conclusion of the round. This round was hosted by Divya & Raginisri, and telecast on 26 July 2010. The host announced that more contestants auditioned during this round than in the Chennai round. After the first day of auditions, 172 contestants were selected to advance to the next round.
10, 11, 12	"Coimbatore Auditions (second round)"	S. P. Sailaja, Sowmya, or Mahathi	27 July 2010 – 29 July 2010
Second round auditions held in Coimbatore required auditioning contestants to perform a song before a single audition judge. Contestants were either spot-selected, rejected, or wait-listed until the conclusion of the round. This round was hosted by Divya. After the first day of this round telecast on 27 July 2010, the Host announced that 160 contestants performed and that the judges selected 46 contestants. This number increased at the end of the second round, as a total of 147 contestants were selected to advance to the next round.
13, 14, 15, 16	"Coimbatore Auditions (third round)"	S. P. Sailaja, Sowmya, and Mahathi	2 August 2010 – 5 August 2010
Third round auditions held in Coimbatore required auditioning contestants to perform a song before a panel of the three judges. Contestants were either spot-selected, rejected, or wait-listed until the conclusion of the round. This round was hosted by Divya, Raginisri, and Ajeesh.
17, 18, 19, 20	"Trichy Auditions (first and second rounds)"	S. P. Sailaja, Sowmya, and Mahathi	9 August 2010 – 12 August 2010
First round auditions held in Trichy required auditioning contestants to perform a song before a single judge while selected contestants who moved to the second round required contestants to perform a song before the panel. Contestants were either spot-selected, rejected, or wait-listed until the conclusion of each round. This round was hosted by Divya. About 1,200 contestants attended auditions in Trichy.

=== Main level auditions ===
All main level auditions were held in Chennai.

==== "Fast Song Slow Song" Chennai Round (16 August 2010 – 19 August 2010) ====
- Permanent Host: Divya
- Guest Judges: Unni Menon, Nithyasree Mahadevan, Haricharan, & Harish Raghavendra

This round required auditioning contestants selected in Chennai to perform a fast song before the panel of guest judges consisting of Nithyasree Mahadevan, Haricharan, Unni Menon & Harish Raghavendra. If the judges requested the auditioning contestant to perform another song, the contestants were required to perform a slow song. Contestants were either spot-selected, rejected, or wait-listed until the conclusion of the round.

==== "Fast Song Slow Song" Coimbatore and Trichy Round (23 August 2010 – 26 August 2010) ====
- Permanent Host: Divya
- Guest Judges: Unni Menon, Nithyasree Mahadevan, Mahathi, & Harish Raghavendra

This round required auditioning contestants selected in Coimbatore and Trichy to perform a fast song before the panel of guest judges consisting of Nithyasree Mahadevan, Mahathi, Unni Menon & Harish Raghavendra. If the judges requested the auditioning contestant to perform another song, the contestants were required to perform a slow song. Contestants were either spot-selected, rejected, or wait-listed until the conclusion of the round.

==== New Songs Round (30 August 2010 – 2 September 2010) ====
- Permanent Host: Divya
- Guest Judges: Nithyasree Mahadevan, Harish Raghavendra, S. P. Sailaja & Pop Shalini

This round required auditioning contestants to perform a song from films released after 2005 before the panel of guest judges consisting of Nithyasree Mahadevan, S. P. Sailaja, Pop Shalini, & Harish Raghavendra. If the judges requested the auditioning contestant to perform another song, the contestants were required to perform a slow song. Contestants were either spot-selected, rejected, or wait-listed until the conclusion of the round.

==== Old Songs Round (6 September 2010 – 9 September 2010) ====
- Permanent Host: Divya
- Guest Judges: S. P. Sailaja, Pop Shalini, Harish Raghavendra, & Mahathi

This round required auditioning contestants to perform a song from old films before a panel of guest judges consisting of Harish Raghavendra, S. P. Sailaja, Pop Shalini, & Mahathi. If the judges requested the auditioning contestant to perform another song, the contestants were required to perform a slow song. Contestants were either spot-selected, rejected, or wait-listed until the conclusion of the round.

==== Group Medley Round (13 September 2010 – 16 September 2010) ====
- Permanent Host: Divya
- Guest Judges: S. P. Sailaja, Malgudi Shubha, Unni Menon, & Sowmya

This round split auditioning contestants into small teams who were required to perform a medley of songs on a given theme. Contestants were either spot-selected, rejected, or wait-listed until the conclusion of the round.

==== Performance Round (20 September 2010 – 23 September 2010) ====
- Permanent Host: Divya
- Guest Judges:

This round required auditioning contestants to impress the judges with their performances through their singing, dancing, and general entertainment. Contestants were either spot-selected, rejected, or wait-listed until the conclusion of the round.

==== One on One Challenge Round (27 September 2010 – 30 September 2010) ====
- Permanent Host: Divya
- Guest Judges: S. P. Sailaja, Nithyasree Mahadevan, Unni Menon & Sowmya

This 1 on 1 challenge round required auditioning contestants to compete against another contestant selected at random. The panel of guest judges consisted of Nithyasree Mahadevan, Unni Menon, S. P. Sailaja, and Sowmya. The winning contestant in each challenge was spot-selected to advance to the next round, while the other contestant was waitlisted.

==== Duet Round (4 October 2010 – 7 October 2010) ====
- Permanent Host: Divya
- Guest Judges: Mano, K. S. Chithra, & Malgudi Shubha

This round required auditioning contestants to perform a song as a duet with a top contestant from season 2 and season 1 of the show, or season 2 of the junior version of the show. The performances were judged by permanent judges of the junior version of the show in season 2. Contestants were either spot-selected, rejected, or wait-listed until the conclusion of the round.

==== Devotional Film Songs Round (11 October 2010 – 14 October 2010) ====
- Permanent Host: Divya
- Guest Judges: Nithyasree Mahadevan, S. P. Sailaja, & Sowmya

This Thirai Isai Bhakthi Paadalgal (Devotional Film Songs) round required auditioning contestants to perform a film song of a devotional genre before a panel of guest judges consisting of Nithyasree Mahadevan, S. P. Sailaja, and Sowmya. Contestants were either spot-selected, rejected, or wait-listed until the conclusion of the round.

==== "Sigarangalin Sangeetham" Round (18 October 2010 – 21 October 2010) ====
- Host:
- Guest Judges: Nithyasree Mahadevan, Vani Jairam, L. R. Eswari, Malaysia Vasudevan, Mano & P. B. Sreenivas

This Sigarangalin Sangeetham round required auditioning contestants to perform a song out of six "legendary" playback singers who were guest judges this week. The guest judges consisted of Malaysia Vasudevan (chief guest), P. B. Sreenivas, Nithyasree Mahadevan, L. R. Eswari, Vani Jairam, and Mano. The format of this round was similar to the 1 on 1 challenge as each contestant would compete with at least two other contestants. The winning contestant in each challenge was spot-selected to advance to the next round, while the other contestants were waitlisted.

==== Rain Songs Round (25 October 2010 – 28 October 2010) ====
- Permanent Host: Divya
- Guest Judges: Sowmya, S. P. Sailaja, & Malgudi Shubha

The Mazhai (Rain) Songs round required contestants to perform a song which fitted the theme of the week – rain. Contestants were either spot-selected, rejected, or wait-listed until the conclusion of the round.

==== Deepavali Special (1 November 2010 – 3 November 2010) ====
- Host: Sivakarthikeyan (male team) versus Kalyani (female team)
- Guest Judges (1 November 2010): (male team) versus (female team)
- Guest Judges (2 November 2010): C. Gopinath (male team) versus Malgudi Shubha (female team)
- Guest Judges (3 November 2010): (male team) versus Suchithra (female team)

This special round was in celebration of the Hindu festival of Deepavali. The auditioning contestants were split into teams of male contestants and female contestants against each other, and had an opportunity to perform classical songs in the episode telecast on 1 November 2010, folk songs in the episode telecast on 2 November 2010, and western (night club) songs in the episode telecast on 3 November 2010. No auditioning contestants were rejected or eliminated from the competition in this week's performances.

==== Writer's Voice Round (8 November 2010 – 11 November 2010) ====
- Permanent Host: Divya
- Guest Judges: Snehan (9 November 2010 episode only), Na. Muthukumar (11 November 2010 episode only), S. P. Sailaja, Malgudi Shubha & Sowmya

This "Kaviyin Kural" (Poet's Voice) round required contestants to perform songs with beautiful lyrics or poetry. Contestants were either spot-selected, rejected, or wait-listed until the conclusion of the round.

The episode telecast on 8 November 2010 required contestants to perform songs penned by Kannadasan.

The episode telecast on 9 November 2010 required contestants to perform songs penned by Vaali, and lyricist Snehan appeared as a guest judge during this episode.

The episode telecast on 10 November 2010 required contestants to perform songs penned by Vairamuthu.

The episode telecast on 11 November 2010 required contestants to perform songs penned by Na. Muthukumar, who also appeared as a guest judge during this episode.

==== Love Songs Round (15 November 2010 – 18 November 2010) ====
- Permanent Host: Divya
- Guest Judges: S. P. Sailaja, Malgudi Shubha, Unni Menon & Sowmya

This round required the auditioning contestants to perform love songs. Contestants were either spot-selected, rejected, or wait-listed until the conclusion of the round.

==== Knockout Round (21 November 2010 – 25 November 2010) ====
- Permanent Host: Divya
- Guest Judges: S. P. Sailaja, Sowmya, Unni Menon & Malgudi Shubha

This round split the contestants into pairs, and required each pair to sing the same song. The contestant who provided the better performance of the song was spot-selected, while the other contestant was wait listed until the conclusion of the round.

==== "Thullal Songs" Round (29 November 2010 – 2 December 2010) ====
- Host: Kalyani
- Guest Judges: S. P. Sailaja, Unni Menon & Malgudi Shubha

The Thullal Songs round required male auditioning contestants to perform a song typically sung when introducing a hero in films, and female auditioning contestants to perform a song of a "peppy" genre which are associated with heroines in films.

==== Emotion Round (6 December 2010 – 9 December 2010) ====
- Host: Kalyani
- Guest Judges: Unni Menon, Sowmya, S. P. Sailaja & Malgudi Shubha

This round required auditioning contestants to perform songs which evoke emotions. Contestants were either spot selected, rejected, or wait listed until the conclusion of the round.

==== Last Qualifying Round (13 December 2010 – 16 December 2010) ====
- Host:
- Guest Judges: S. P. Sailaja, Unni Menon & Malgudi Shubha

==== Recall Round (20 December 2010 – 23 December 2010) ====
- Permanent Host: Divya
- Guest Judges: Nithyasree Mahadevan, Unni Menon, Sowmya, Malgudi Shubha & Ananth Vaidyanathan

==== Celebration Round (27 December 2010 – 30 December 2010) ====
- Permanent Host: Divya
- Guest Judges: Unni Menon, Sowmya, Malgudi Shubha & Ananth Vaidyanathan

== Finalists ==
Saicharan (local contestant ID SS10 and top 10 contestant ID SS07), known in the show as Saicharan, is a singer who received training in Carnatic music prior to participating in the competition. He was previously a top 4 finalist in the debut season of the junior version of the show, Airtel Super Singer Junior. He auditioned for season 3 of the show, and participated in most of the main competition performance rounds. When he was eliminated from the competition by the permanent judges by half a mark, the decision was challenged by viewers. He subsequently qualified as a wildcard contestant, and re-entered the competition as a grand finalist after receiving the highest number of viewer votes.

Saicharan was crowned the winner of the competition, and was awarded an apartment worth 4 million Indian Rupees by the show's sponsor Arun Excello. He was chosen by A. R. Rahman and D. Imman to sing in the 2012 films Godfather, Manam Kothi Paravai, and Saattai.

In 2013, Saisharan captained his team to win the debut season of Super Singer T20, a spin-off version of the show which formed part of Vijay TV's Super Singer television series. In 2015, Saisharan captained his team to win a second consecutive season of the show.

Santhosh Hariharan (contestant ID SS05), known in the show as Santhosh, previously appeared in season 2 of the show. He lacked exposure to Indian classical music prior to and following the competition. He was initially eliminated by the permanent judges during season 3, but qualified as a wild card contestant. He re-entered the competition as a grand finalist after receiving sufficient viewer votes.

Santhosh was crowned runner-up of the competition after receiving the second highest number of viewer votes, and was awarded a car by the show's sponsor Tata Vista. Santhosh was chosen by D. Imman to sing the hit song "Oorana Oorukkulle" in the 2012 film, Manam Kothi Paravai.

Sathyaprakash Dharmar (contestant ID SS01), known in the show as Sathyaprakash, was born to a family hailing from Solavandan to Coimbatore. He received training in Carnatic music, and had released albums with Rajalakshmi Audio prior to entering the competition. He was placed into the grand finals by the permanent judges.

Sathyaprakash ended up in third place at the end of the competition for which he won a cash prize of 300,000 Indian Rupees, and was also chosen by actor Dhanush to sing in the 2012 film, 3, as well as music director G. V. Prakash Kumar to sing in the 2012 film Thandavam.

Pooja Vaidyanath (contestant ID SS02), known in the show as Pooja, was born to a family hailing from Andhra Pradesh. Pooja previously entered music competition reality TV shows on Telugu language TV channels, including Maa TV's Padalani Undi which she won in 2006 and Zee Telugu Sa Re Ga Ma Pa Voice of Youth which she was crowned runner-up in 2008. She also won the Vaanampadi competition broadcast in 2010 on rival Tamil language channel Kalaignar TV. However, she did not receive any training in Carnatic music prior to entering the competition. She was placed into the grand finals by the permanent judges.

Pooja ended up in fourth place at the end of the competition for which she won a cash prize of 100,000 Indian Rupees, and was chosen by music directors James Vasanthan and Phani Kalyan to sing in the 2012 Telugu language film, Dalam and in the 2012 Tamil language film, Konjam Koffee Konjam Kaadhal.

Srinivasan Raghunathan (contestant ID SS04), known in the show as Nivas, was born to a family hailing from Kerala, and received some training prior to entering the competition. He later qualified as a wildcard entrant but did not receive enough viewer votes to enter the grand finals in view of matters not disclosed to viewers previously. Nivas had already made his debut as a playback singer prior to the competition when he was chosen by music director James Vasanthan to sing in the Kannada language film Police Quarter (and Tamil language version of the film, Kathalar Kudiyuruppu,). It was not until season 2 of Super Singer T20 that it was revealed that Nivas received training during the course of the competition from James Vasanthan.

Nevertheless, Nivas rose to fame after being chosen by Vidyasagar to sing in the Malayalam language film, Diamond Necklace, and was re-christened by A. R. Rahman in the Kannada language film, Godfather.

Pravin Saivi (top 10 contestant ID SS10), also known as Praveen, hails from Singapore and entered the competition as one of 9 international finalists in March 2011 but missed many of the main level auditions and the first 9 main competition performance rounds. He was the last international contestant to be eliminated from the competition, but won a prize for being the winner among the international contestants.

Praveen was the music director and composer for the 2014 film, Puthiathor Ulagam Seivom, and appeared as an actor in the film. Praveen was also chosen by music director Harris Jayaraj to sing in the 2014 film, Nannbenda.

Kaushik Sridharan (local contestant ID SS12 and top 10 contestant ID SS03), known in the show as Kaushik, was eliminated from the competition, but later qualified as a wildcard contestant.

Kaushik has given multiple stage performances with various musicians, including fellow eliminated contestant, Dhanyashree.

Dhanyashree (local contestant ID SS19 and top 10 contestant ID SS06) is a disciple of Lalitha Sivakumar, mother of Nithyasree Mahadevan. She was eliminated from the competition at the conclusion of the Evergreen Songs Round telecast on 14 July 2011, but later qualified as a wildcard contestant. She was previously a contestant in the 1st season of the show, Airtel Super Singer Junior.

Dhanyashree was chosen by music director R. Haribabu to sing "Nan Ninaithidathane" for the 2013 film, Padikira Vayasula.

Malavika Sundar (local contestant ID SS07 and top 10 contestant ID SS08), known in the show as Maalavika, was finally eliminated from the competition.

Maalavika was chosen by music director D. Imman to co-sing the musical hit "Dang Dang…" with Saicharan in the 2012 film, Manam Kothi Paravai.

Hariharasudhan Narayanan (contestant ID SS16), known in the show as Hariharasudhan, was born to a family hailing from Thiruvidaimaruthur. He was eliminated from the competition at the conclusion of the Moon Songs Round originally telecast on 31 March 2011, but later qualified as a wildcard contestant.

He subsequently made his debut as a playback singer after being chosen by music director D. Imman to sing in the 2013 Tamil language film Varuthapadatha Valibar Sangam. His playback debut song "Oodha Colour Ribbon" became one of the biggest chartbusters during 2013.

Deepak K. (local contestant ID SS14), known in the show as Deepak, participated in other music competition reality TV shows on other channels, including Zee Tamil Sa Re Ga Ma Pa 2009 Challenge. He was eliminated from the show at the conclusion of the Latest Peppy Songs Round in the episode originally telecast on 27 January 2011. He was the second eliminated local contestant.

Despite his early elimination, Deepak became a playback singer in 2012 after singing "Boy Boy" for the Telugu language film, Neeku Naaku Dash Dash.

Sakthi Loganathan (local contestant ID SS03 and top 10 contestant ID SS09), known in the show as Shakthi, is related to playback singer Tiruchi Loganathan. Prior to entering the competition, he participated in music competition reality TV shows on rival Tamil language TV channels, including Sun TV's Athiradi Singer in 2009. He was finally eliminated from Airtel Super Singer 3 on 1 July 2011 at the conclusion of the Western Round originally telecast on 1 July 2011.

In 2013, Shakthi married fellow-eliminated contestant Mathangi Sounderrajan. In 2015, he auditioned for season 5 of the show.

Krishna Sridharan (local contestant ID SS09), known in the show as Krishna, was born to a family hailing from Kerala. He received training in Carnatic music, and is a software engineer. He was eliminated at the conclusion of the Retro Round originally telecast on 17 June 2011.

Jithin Raj (local contestant ID SS13), known in the show as Jithin, was born to a family hailing from Kerala. An engineering graduate prior to entering the competition, he was eliminated from the competition at the conclusion of the Ramarajan Hits Round originally telecast on 24 February 2011.

Jithin subsequently entered as a contestant and was crowned first runner-up in season 2 of Indian Voice, a music competition reality TV show which was broadcast in 2012 on Malayalam language TV channel Mazhavil Manorama. He was later chosen by music director D. Imman to sing in the 2015 Tamil language film Sigaram Thodu, having made his debut as a playback singer in the yet to be released Tamil film Uppili, and Malayalam language film Avarude Veedu. Jithin also made his debut as an actor in the Malayalam language film entitled Neeyum Pinne Njanum, and in Vaanavil Vaazhkai – a 2015 Tamil language film directed by James Vasanthan which received mostly negative reviews.

Mathangi Sounderrajan (local contestant ID SS11), known in the show as Mathangi, participated in music competition reality TV shows on rival Tamil language TV channels prior to entering the competition, including Sun TV's Athiradi Singer in 2009. Notably, she had also won season 3 of S. P. Balasubrahmanyam's Ennodu Paattu Paadungal which was telecast on Jaya TV. She was the fourth local contestant to be eliminated from the competition at the conclusion of the Koothu Songs Round originally telecast on 10 February 2011.

In 2013, Mathangi married fellow-eliminated contestant Sakthi Loganathan.

Madhumitha Srinivasan (local contestant ID SS02), commonly known as "Madhu Iyer", was born to a family hailing from Kerala. Madhumitha previously featured in another music competition broadcast by Vijay TV entitled Apoorva Ragangal where she was selected as the best performer. She receives training in Hindustani music from Sriram Parasuram (husband of a former judge from the show, Anuradha Sriram), and in Carnatic music from P. Vasanthkumar. She was eliminated at the conclusion of the Dedication Round originally telecast on 3 March 2011.

Madhumitha R. (local contestant ID SS06) was born to a family hailing from Kerala. She was eliminated at the conclusion of the Kannadasan Hits Round originally telecast on 2 June 2011.

Soundharya Nandakumar (local contestant ID SS20), known in the show as Soundharya, is a trained Indian classical dancer. She was eliminated at the conclusion of the Debut Songs Round originally telecast on 24 March 2011, but subsequently appeared in season 4 of the show and progressed to a further stage in that season of the competition.

Saiesan Muthulingam, known in the show as Sai Esan, was born on 23 February 1994 in Toronto to a Sri Lankan Tamil family. Hailing from Canada, Sai Esan had to travel to India to participate in the competition. He was the youngest contestant, being at the age of 17 when he entered the competition. However, being one of the 9 international finalists who entered the competition in March 2011, he missed many of the main level auditions and the first 9 main competition performance rounds. Prior to entering the competition, he learnt Carnatic music for ten years, and had performed songs in the Tamil and Hindi languages during stage performances in Toronto and in the United States of America. He was the second-placed international contestant, after being eliminated from the competition at the conclusion of the Juniors versus Seniors Round in the episode originally telecast on 10 June 2011.

Suraj hails from Singapore, and had to travel to India to participate in the competition. He entered the competition as one of 9 international finalists in March 2011 but missed many of the main level auditions and the first 9 main competition performance rounds. He was the third-placed international contestant, after being eliminated from the competition at the conclusion of the Kamal Hits Round originally telecast on 26 May 2011.

Vijitha Sureshkumar, known in the show as Vijitha, was born to a Sri Lankan Tamil family. Hailing from Canada, she had to travel to India to participate in the competition. She entered the competition as one of 9 international finalists in March 2011 but missed many of the main level auditions and the first 9 main competition performance rounds. Vijitha appeared as a host of the show during the Moon Songs Round originally telecast from 28 March 2011 to 31 March 2011, based on her experience as a Tamil language RJ in Canada which was noted by the judges during the show. However, when resuming as a contestant, her comments during the episode telecast on 12 May 2011 caused some concern. She was the sixth eliminated international contestant at the conclusion of the Dedication Round originally telecast on 19 May 2011.

Elizabeth Malini hails from Norway, and had to travel to India to participate in the competition. She entered the competition as one of 9 international finalists in March 2011 but missed many of the main level auditions and the first 9 main competition performance rounds. She and Shanthya were jointly eliminated from the competition at the conclusion of the Commercial Hits Round originally telecast on 12 May 2011.

Shanthya was born to a Sri Lankan Tamil family. Hailing from Canada, she had to travel to India to participate in the competition. She entered the competition as one of 9 international finalists in March 2011 but missed many of the main level auditions and the first 9 main competition performance rounds. She and Elizabeth were jointly eliminated from the competition at the conclusion of the Commercial Hits Round originally telecast on 12 May 2011.

Nirjaany Nirjaa Karunakaran, known in the show as Nirjani, was born to a Sri Lankan Tamil family. Hailing from Canada, she had to travel to India to participate in the competition leaving aside her job as a travel consultant. She entered the competition as one of 9 international finalists in March 2011 but missed many of the main level auditions and the first 9 main competition performance rounds. She was the fourth eliminated international contestant at the conclusion of the Bharathiraja Round originally telecast on 28 April 2011.

In 2015, she participated in auditions for season 5 of the show.

Jaishree Vishwanathan, known in the show as Jaishri, hails from Singapore, and had to travel to India to participate in the competition. She entered the competition as one of 9 international finalists in March 2011 but missed many of the main level auditions and the first 9 main competition performance rounds. She was the fifth eliminated international contestant at the conclusion of the Freestyle Round originally telecast on 5 May 2011.

Dinesh hails from Singapore, and had to travel to India to participate in the competition. He entered the competition as one of 9 international finalists in March 2011 but missed many of the main level auditions and the first 9 main competition performance rounds. He was the first eliminated international contestant from the competition at the conclusion of the New Songs Round originally telecast on 7 April 2011.

Deepika (local contestant ID SS17) was eliminated from the show at the conclusion of the Love Songs Round in the episode originally telecast on 17 February 2011. She was the fifth eliminated local contestant.

Aravind (local contestant ID SS08) was born to a family hailing from Kerala. He was eliminated from the show at the conclusion of the Judges Songs Round in the episode originally telecast on 3 February 2011. He was the third eliminated local contestant.

In 2015, he auditioned for season 5 of the show, and was selected as a top 33 finalist.

John Vianni (local contestant ID SS18) was eliminated from the show at the conclusion of the Folk Round in the episode originally telecast on 20 January 2011. He was the first eliminated local contestant.

== Finals ==
=== Main Competition Performance Rounds ===
==== Introduction Round (3 January 2011 – 6 January 2011) ====
- Permanent Host: Divya
- Guest Performers (3 January 2011 and 4 January 2011 episodes only): actress & playback singer Andrea Jeremiah, playback singer Mano, and winners of earlier seasons of the TV series (Alka Ajith, Ajeesh & Krishnamoorthy)
- Permanent Judges (5 January 2011 and 6 January 2011 episodes only): Srinivas, Sujatha Mohan and P. Unnikrishnan
- Performances:

This round was a special non-competition celebration round. It was the first time the top 20 contestants would perform at the new and unique Airtel Super Singer 3 studio, where the finals took place for the most part. This presumably also marked the start of the new year, 2011, as there was no risk of eliminations this week. Nevertheless, the episode telecast on 3 January 2011 did not showcase contestant performances, but instead consisted of performances by non-contestant guest performers.

In the episode telecast on 4 January 2011, the initial top 20 local contestants were required to perform in small groups. The first group of contestants (Saicharan, Shrinivas, and Hariharasuthan) performed the song "Om Sivoham" from the 2009 film, Naan Kadavul (lyrics penned by Vaali, music by Ilaiyaraaja, and originally sung by Vijay Prakash). This was followed by another special performance by guest Andrea Jeremiah who sang the song "Thediyae", which she had sung in the 2010 film, Va (lyrics penned by Kumararaja and music by G. V. Prakash Kumar). Next was a performance of the song "Raadhai Manadhil" from the 2000 film Snegithiye (lyrics penned by Vairamuthu, music by Vidyasagar, and originally sung by K. S. Chithra, Sujatha Mohan & Sangeetha Sajith).

In the episodes telecast on 5 and 6 January 2011, the permanent judges were introduced, and the top 20 contestants were required to each provide a solo performance in the order of their contestant IDs.

After contestant SS18 John Vianni's performance of "Aathangara Maname" (originally sung by Mano and Sujatha Mohan), Sujatha Mohan and presenter Divya together with John Vianni sang an excerpt of "Aathangara Maname" together as a special performance.

===== Initial top 20 contestant IDs =====
The top 20 local finalists selected through the main audition rounds are as follows:

Contestant ID	Finalist	Gender
SS01	Sathyaprakash	Male
SS02	Madhumathi Srinivasan (Also known as "Madhumitha S" and "Madhu Iyer")	Female
SS03	Sakthi Loganathan ("Shakthi")	Male
SS04	Srinivasan Raghunathan ("Shrinivas")	Male
SS05	Santhosh Hariharan	Male
SS06	R. Madhumitha	Female
SS07	Malavika Sundar	Female
SS08	Arvind	Male
SS09	Krishna Sridharan	Male
SS10	Saisharan	Male
SS11	Mathangi Sounderrajan	Female
SS12	Kaushik	Male
SS13	Jithin Raj	Male
SS14	Deepak Subramanyam	Male
SS15	Jayalakshmi	Female
SS16	Hariharasuthan	Male
SS17	Deepika	Female
SS18	John Vinni	Male
SS19	Dhanyashree	Female
SS20	Soundarya Bala Nandakumar	Female

==== Yuvan Shankar Raja Hits Round (10 January 2011 – 13 January 2011) ====
- Permanent Host: Divya
- Permanent Judge: Srinivas
- Guest Judges: Yuvan Shankar Raja and S. P. Sailaja

This round required the initial top 20 local contestants to perform hits of music director, Yuvan Shankar Raja.

Performances from this round were noteworthy.

==== Folk Round (17 January 2011 – 20 January 2011) ====
- Permanent Host: Divya
- Permanent Judges: Srinivas, Mano, and P. Unnikrishnan

This round required the initial top 20 local contestants to perform songs of a folk genre. At the end of this round, the permanent judges eliminated contestant SS18 John from the competition.

==== Latest "Peppy" Songs Round (24 January 2011 – 27 January 2011) ====
- Permanent Host: Sivakarthikeyan
- Permanent Voice Trainer: Ananth Vaidyanathan
- Permanent Judges: Srinivas and P. Unnikrishnan
- Guest Judge: Unni Menon

This round required the initial top 19 local contestants to perform recently released "peppy" songs. At the end of this round, the permanent judges eliminated contestant SS14 Deepak from the competition.

==== Judges Songs Round (31 January 2011 – 3 February 2011) ====
- Permanent Host: Divya
- Permanent Voice Trainer: Ananth Vaidyanathan
- Permanent Judges: Srinivas, Sujatha Mohan, and P. Unnikrishnan

This round required the initial top 18 local contestants to perform songs originally sung by the show's permanent judges. At the end of this round, the permanent judges eliminated contestant SS08 Arvind from the competition.

==== Koothu Songs Round (7 February 2011 – 10 February 2011) ====
- Permanent Host: Divya
- Permanent Voice Trainer: Ananth Vaidyanathan
- Permanent Judges: Srinivas, Sujatha Mohan, and P. Unnikrishnan

This round required the initial top 17 local contestants to perform koothu-style songs in a one-versus-one style competition. The weaker performing competitor of each pair of contestants was sent to a "weakest performing competitor" zone while the other contestant was safe from eliminations this week. Contestants who entered this zone included contestant SS20 Soundarya, contestant and SS11 Mathangi.

At the end of this round, the permanent judges eliminated contestant SS11 Mathangi Sounderrajan from the competition. This decision was particularly controversial, and was challenged by various other contestants after the decision was announced, many viewers who considered the decision unjustified at such an early stage in the competition. Contestant Mathangi Sounderrajan was previously crowned runner up Sun TV's Athiradi Singer in 2009, and was the winner in season 3 of S. P. Balasubrahmanyam's Ennodu Paattu Paadungal telecast on Jaya TV.

==== Love Songs Round (14 February 2011 – 17 February 2011) ====
- Host: DD
- Permanent Judges: Srinivas, Sujatha Mohan, and P. Unnikrishnan

This Kaadhal Gaanangal ("Love Melodies") round required the initial top 16 local contestants to provide a duet performance of a love song. Despite being duet performances, contestants were judged individually. Contestants who were waitlisted after the performances were required to provide a solo performance of love song with a view to avoiding elimination in this week's round. Contestants who entered the danger zone included SS20 Soundarya, SS05 Santhosh Hariharan, and SS17 Deepika.

At the end of this round, the permanent judges eliminated contestant SS17 Deepika from the competition.

==== Ramarajan Hits Round (21 February 2011 – 24 February 2011) ====
- Permanent Host: Sivakarthikeyan
- Permanent Voice Trainer: Ananth Vaidyanathan
- Permanent Judges: Srinivas, Mano, and P. Unnikrishnan

This round required the initial top 15 local contestants to perform songs featured in hit films starring actor Ramarajan. Contestants who entered the danger zone this week included contestant SS20 Soundarya and contestant SS13 Jithin Raj.

At the end of this round, the permanent judges eliminated contestant SS13 Jithin Raj from the competition.

==== Dedication Round (28 February 2011 – 3 March 2011) ====
- Permanent Host: Sivakarthikeyan
- Permanent Voice Trainer: Ananth Vaidyanathan
- Permanent Judges: Srinivas, Sujatha Mohan, and P. Unnikrishnan

This round required the initial top 14 local contestants to perform songs whom they could dedicate to anyone they wished. The round was very emotional for contestants, judges, and the viewers. Sivakarthikeyan presented this round particularly well.

Contestants who entered the danger zone this week included contestant SS20 Soundarya and SS03 Madhumitha S. ("Madhu Iyer") Many viewers considered that contestant SS20 Soundarya should have been eliminated by this time. However, at the end of this round, the permanent judges eliminated contestant SS03 Madhumitha S. ("Madhu Iyer") from the competition.

==== International Contestant Auditions (7 March 2011 – 10 March 2011) ====
- Permanent Host: Divya
- Guest Judges: S. P. Sailaja, Malgudi Shubha, Unni Menon & Sowmya

This week's episode telecast auditions held in Singapore for international contestants. Playback singer Vijay Prakash appeared as a guest performer in the episode telecast on 8 March 2011 to give a special performance of "Om Sivoham".

In the end, 9 international contestants were introduced as finalists to the show (in addition to the 13 remaining local finalists):

Finalist	Gender	Country
Dinesh	Male	Singapore
Elizabeth	Female	Canada
Jayashri	Female	Singapore
Saiesan	Male	Canada
Sooraj	Male	Singapore
Shanthya	Female	Norway
Nirjaani	Female	Canada
Vijitha	Female	Canada
Praveen	Male	Singapore

==== MGR Saroja Devi Round (14 March 2011 – 17 March 2011) ====
- Host: DD
- Permanent Voice Trainer: Ananth Vaidyanathan
- Permanent Judges: Srinivas, Sujatha Mohan, and Mano
- Guest Judge: P. Susheela

This round required the male contestants to perform songs featured in hit films starring actor M. G. Ramachandran, and female songs featured in hit films starring actress B. Saroja Devi.

At the end of the round, the judges announced that none of the initial top 13 local contestants would be eliminated from the competition based on their performances this week. The judges also announced that the performances by the international contestants will be assessed over the next 3 weeks and the total marks will be averaged before any international contestants are eliminated.

==== Debut Songs Round (21 March 2011 – 24 March 2011) ====
- Permanent Host: Divya
- Permanent Voice Trainer: Ananth Vaidyanathan
- Permanent Judges: Srinivas, Sujatha Mohan, and P. Unnikrishnan

This round required the initial top 13 local contestants (as well as the 9 international contestants) to perform songs from which various South Indian singers made their debut as playback singers in the Tamil film (also known as "Kollywood") industry.

At the end of this round, the permanent judges eliminated contestant SS20 Soundarya from the competition. As announced in the previous week, international contestants were safe from elimination during this round.

==== Moon Songs Round (28 March 2011 – 31 March 2011) ====
- Host: International Contestant Vijitha
- Permanent Voice Trainer: Ananth Vaidyanathan
- Permanent Judges: Srinivas and P. Unnikrishnan
- Guest Judge: Nithyasree Mahadevan

The "Nila Padalgal" (Moon Songs) round required the initial top 12 local contestants (as well as the 9 international contestants) to perform songs over two parts which fitted the theme of the week – the moon. The setting and lighting in the studio where the show is recorded was transformed completely. The Host, voice trainer, permanent judges, and contestants were all dressed in white (or black and white) to celebrate the theme.

At the end of this round, the permanent judges placed contestants SS16 Hariharasuthan and SS12 Kaushik into the danger zone before eliminating contestant SS16 Hariharasuthan from the competition. As announced in the previous week, international contestants were safe from elimination during this round.

==== New Songs Round (4 April 2011 – 7 April 2011) ====
- Permanent Host: Sivakarthikeyan
- Permanent Voice Trainer: Ananth Vaidyanathan
- Permanent Judges: Srinivas, Sujatha Mohan, and P. Unnikrishnan

This round required the initial top 11 local contestants (as well as the 9 international contestants) to perform songs recently released.

At the end of this round, all top 11 local contestants were safe from eliminations. However, the permanent judges announced that an international contestant would be eliminated every fortnight. The first international contestant to be eliminated by the permanent judges was Dinesh from Singapore.

==== Special Performance Round (11 April 2011 – 14 April 2011) ====
- Host: Deepak
- Permanent Voice Trainer: Ananth Vaidyanathan
- Guest Judges: Haricharan and Suchithra Karthik Kumar

This non-elimination round required the initial top 11 local contestants (as well as the 8 international contestants) to compete for a prize of 100,000 rupees.

==== Other Language Songs Round (18 April 2011 – 21 April 2011) ====
- Permanent Host: Divya
- Permanent Voice Trainer: Ananth Vaidyanathan
- Permanent Judges: Srinivas, Sujatha Mohan, and P. Unnikrishnan
- Guests (episode telecast on 19 April 2011 only): Siddharth and Priya Anand

This round required the initial top 11 local contestants (as well as the 8 international contestants) to perform songs in languages other than Tamil.

During the week, actor Siddharth, actress Priya Anand, and director Jayendra made a guest appearance on the show to promote the release of the then-recently released film, 180.

At the end of this round, all 8 international contestants were safe from eliminations while contestant Shakthi and contestant Malavika were placed in the danger zone from the top 11 contestants. However, the permanent judges decided not to eliminate either contestant this week.

==== Bharathiraja Round (25 April 2011 – 28 April 2011) ====
- Permanent Host: Sivakarthikeyan
- Permanent Voice Trainer: Ananth Vaidyanathan
- Permanent Judges: Srinivas, Sujatha Mohan, and P. Unnikrishnan

This round required the initial top 11 local contestants (as well as the 8 international contestants) to perform songs featured in films directed by Bharathiraja.

At the end of this round, all top 11 contestants were safe from eliminations. However, the permanent judges eliminated contestant Nirjani from Canada.

==== Freestyle Round (2 May 2011 – 5 May 2011) ====
- Permanent Host: Divya
- Permanent Voice Trainer: Ananth Vaidyanathan
- Permanent Judges: Srinivas, Sujatha Mohan, and P. Unnikrishnan

This round required the initial top 11 local contestants (as well as the 7 international contestants) to perform songs of their choice.

At the end of this round, contestants Sakthi, Jayashri, Shanthya, and Elizabeth were placed in the danger zone before the permanent judges eliminated international contestant Jayashri from Singapore.

Shortly before the elimination, host Divya Vijaygopal commented to two contestants during the final episode of the week that they were always in the danger zone and were not practising. Subsequently, viewers expressed that the comments were extremely inappropriate and proposed that she be replaced as the show's permanent television anchor.

==== Commercial Hits Round (9 May 2011 – 12 May 2011) ====
- Permanent Host: Divya
- Permanent Judges: Srinivas and Sujatha Mohan
- Guest Judge: Annupamaa
- Performances:

Prior to the commencement of the round, the show disclosed that there would be a double elimination of international contestants this week.

The round required the initial top 11 local contestants (as well as the 6 international contestants) to perform commercial hit songs. In particular, male contestants were required to perform hit songs played in movies to introduce actors as the hero, while female contestants were required to perform hit songs played in movies to introduce actresses as heroines.

At the end of this round, international contestants Shanthya and Elizabeth were eliminated from the competition.

==== Dedication Round (16 May 2011 – 19 May 2011) ====
- Permanent Host: Sivakarthikeyan
- Permanent Voice Trainer: Ananth Vaidyanathan
- Permanent Judges: Srinivas, Sujatha Mohan, and P. Unnikrishnan

This round required the initial top 11 local contestants (as well as the 4 international contestants) to perform songs dedicated to any person of their choice.

At the end of this round, contestant Srinivas, international contestant Sai Esan, and international contestant Vijitha from Canada was placed in the danger zone. International contestant Vijitha from Canada was eliminated.

==== Kamal Hits Round (23 May 2011 – 26 May 2011) ====
- Permanent Host: Divya
- Permanent Voice Trainer: Ananth Vaidyanathan
- Permanent Judges: Srinivas, Sujatha Mohan, and P. Unnikrishnan

This round required the initial top 11 local contestants (as well as the 3 international contestants) to perform songs featuring or performed by actor Kamal Haasan.

At the end of the round, contestant Sakthi, contestant Dhanyashree, international contestant Suraj and international contestant Sai Esan were placed in the danger zone by the permanent judges, before the permanent judges eliminated international contestant Suraj.

==== Kannadasan Hits Round (30 May 2011 – 2 June 2011) ====
- Host: Gopinath
- Permanent Voice Trainer: Ananth Vaidyanathan
- Permanent Judges: Srinivas and Sujatha Mohan
- Guest Judge: Nithyasree Mahadevan

This round required the initial top 11 local contestants (as well as the 2 international contestants) to perform hit songs for which lyrics were penned by lyricist Kannadasan.

At the end of the round, the permanent judges placed contestant Sakthi, contestant Krishna, contestant Madhumitha R., and international contestant Praveen, into the danger zone before eliminating contestant Madhumitha R.

==== Juniors versus Seniors Round (6 June 2011 – 10 June 2011) ====
- Permanent Host: Divya
- Permanent Voice Trainer: Ananth Vaidyanathan
- Permanent Judges: Srinivas, Sujatha Mohan, and Malgudi Shubha
- Guest Judges: Unni Menon and Annupamaa

This round required the initial top 10 local contestants (as well as 2 international contestants) to compete against various former contestants from seasons 1 and 2 of the Airtel Super Singer Junior show, and former contestants from Vijay TV's Junior Super Stars show.

At the end of this round, the permanent judges placed contestant Sakthi, contestant Dhanyashree, contestant Santosh, and international contestant Sai Esan into the danger zone before eliminating international contestant Sai Esan from the competition.

==== Retro Round (13 June 2011 – 17 June 2011) ====
- Permanent Host: Sivakarthikeyan
- Permanent Voice Trainer: Ananth Vaidyanathan
- Permanent Judges: Srinivas and Sujatha Mohan
- Performances:

The initial top 10 local contestants (and 1 international contestant) were required to sing retro-style songs from 1970s and 1980s films. Each contestant was required to sing a song in the first part of the round, and another song in the second part of the round.

At the conclusion of the round, the judges placed 4 contestants (Kaushik, Malavika, Krishna & Shakthi) into the danger zone. The judges said that Krishna (together with Saicharan and Sathyaprakash) was one of the most technically sound singers left in the competition, "but the soul in the singing of film songs" is something Krishna still needs to understand. The judges also said that Kaushik and Krishna lacked confidence in their singing. In the end, the judges eliminated Krishna.

– Non-competitive performance
– Contestant is eliminated from bottom four

Air date	Order	Contestant(s)	Song	Original artist	Lyricist	Music composer/director	Source/Movie (year)
17 June 2011	1	Shakthi	"Ore Naal Unnai Naan"	S. P. Balasubrahmanyam & Vani Jayaram	Vaali	Ilaiyaraaja	Ilamai Oonjal Aadukirathu (1976)
17 June 2011	2	Malavika	"Aayiram Malargale"	Jency, Malaysia Vasudevan & S. P. Sailaja	Kannadasan	Ilaiyaraaja	Niram Maaratha Pookkal (1979)
17 June 2011	3	Santhosh	"Bhoopalam Isaikkum"	K. J. Yesudas & Uma Ramanan	Muthulingam	Ilaiyaraaja	Thooral Ninnu Pochchu (1982)
17 June 2011	4	Shrinivas	"Poove Ilaiya Poove"	Malaysia Vasudevan	Vairamuthu	Ilaiyaraaja	Kozhi Koovuthu (1982)
17 June 2011	5	Krishna	"Vaa Vaa En Devadhai"	Madhu Balakrishnan	Vairamuthu	Vidyasagar	Abhiyum Naanum (2008)

==== Top 10 Celebrations Round and Avan Ivan Special (20 June 2011 – 24 June 2011) ====
- Permanent Host: Divya
- Permanent Voice Trainer: Ananth Vaidyanathan
- Permanent Judges: Srinivas and Malgudi Shubha
- Guest Judges: S. P. Sailaja and Unni Menon
- Guest Appearance: Arya and Vishal

The initial top 9 local contestants and 1 international contestant remaining in the competition were named the top 10 contestants. Contestant IDs were changed for this leg of the competition.

===== New contestant IDs for Top 10 contestants =====
Contestant ID	Finalist	Gender
SS01	Sathyaprakash	Male
SS02	Pooja Vaidyanath ("Pooja")	Female
SS03	Koushik	Male
SS04	Srinivasan Raghunathan ("Shrinivas")	Male
SS05	Santhosh Hariharan	Male
SS06	Dhanyashree	Female
SS07	Saisharan	Male
SS08	Malavika Sundar	Female
SS09	Sakthi Loganathan ("Shakthi")	Male
SS10	Pravin Saivi	Male

==== Western Round (27 June 2011 – 1 July 2011) ====
- Permanent Host: Divya
- Permanent Voice Trainer: Ananth Vaidyanathan
- Permanent Judges: Srinivas and Sujatha Mohan
- Guest Judge: Karthik
- Guest: Karthik's band

Contestant Sakthi was eliminated at the conclusion of this round.

==== Devotional Songs Round (4 July 2011 – 8 July 2011) ====
- Permanent Host: Divya
- Special Guest Host: Suki Sivam
- Permanent Voice Trainer: Ananth Vaidyanathan
- Permanent Judges: P. Unnikrishnan, Srinivas & Sujatha Mohan
- Guest Judges: Veeramani Raju, Sirkazhi G. Sivachidambaram, Mahanadhi Shobana Vignesh & T. L. Maharajen
- Special Guest Musicians: Rajhesh Vaidhya (veena), K. V. Prasad (mridangam), T. H. V. Umashankar (ghatam), K.J. Vijay (flute) & Chitti (vibraphone)
- Performances:

The "Bhakthi Padalgal" (Devotional Songs) round required the top contestants to perform songs which fitted in the devotional genre. During this round, guest judge Sirkazhi G. Sivachidambaram also gave a special performance, singing "Maname Unnakken Indha Vaattam"(originally sung by his father Sirkazhi Govindarajan). The performance from Saicharan was the best from this round.

– Non-competitive performance
– Contestant is eliminated

Air date	Contestant(s)	Song	Original artist	Lyricist	Music composer/director	Source/Movie (year)
July 2011	Sathyaprakash	"Kettadhum Koduppavane Krishna"	T. M. Soundararajan	Kannadasan	M. S. Viswanathan	Deiva Magan (1969)
July 2011	Dhanyashri	"Yedu Thanthaanadi"	Seerkazhi Govindarajan & S. Varalakshmi	Kannadasan & Poovai Senguttuvan	Kunnakudi Vaidyanathan	Rajaraja Cholan (1973)
July 2011	Saicharan	"Isai Thamizh Nee Seidha"	T. R. Mahalingam	Kannadasan	K. V. Mahadevan	Thiruvilaiyadal (1965)
July 2011	Malavika	"Solla Solla"	P. Susheela	Kannadasan	K. V. Mahadevan	Kandan Karunai (1967)

==== Evergreen Songs Round (11 July 2011 – 14 July 2011) ====
- Host: C. Gopinath
- Permanent Judges: Srinivas, Sujatha Mohan and P. Unnikrishnan
- Performances:

==== Rajini Songs (18 July 2011 – 21 July 2011) ====
- Host: C. Gopinath

==== Unplugged Round (25 July 2011 – 28 July 2011) ====
- Permanent Host: Divya

==== Top 5 Selection Round (1 August 2011 – 5 August 2011) ====
- Permanent Host: Divya

The top 6 remaining contestants were required to perform.

At the conclusion of the round, Kaushik was eliminated.

==== (8 August 2011 – 11 August 2011) ====
- Permanent Host: Divya

The top 5 remaining contestants were required to perform.

At the conclusion of the round, Malavika was finally eliminated.

=== Semifinal Rounds ===
==== Independence Day Special (15 August 2011 – 19 August 2011) ====
- Permanent Host: Divya

==== Semi Finals Round (22 August 2011 – 26 August 2011) ====
- Permanent Host: Divya

Saisharan was eliminated.

=== Wildcard Rounds & SS Awards ===
==== Wildcard Entry Round (29 August 2011 – 2 September 2011) ====
- Host: C. Gopinath

==== Wildcard Performance Round (5 September 2011 – 9 September 2011) ====
- Host: C. Gopinath

==== Super Singer Awards and Wildcard Results (12 September 2011 – 13 September 2011) ====
- Host: C. Gopinath

=== Prefinal Rounds ===
==== Super Singers Perform Live (14 September 2011 – 16 September 2011) ====
- Permanent Host: Divya

==== Prefinals (19 September 2011 – 22 September 2011) ====
- Permanent Host: Divya

=== Live Grand Finale (23 September 2011) ===
- Permanent Hosts: Divya and Sivakarthikeyan
- Chief Guests: Dhanush, G. V. Prakash Kumar and A. R. Murugadoss
- Performances:

The grand finale was held at Chennai Trade Centre and broadcast live, with the results of the competition being announced after midnight.

Performances by title winner Saisharan, which consisted of renditions of "Paattum Naane" and "Mazhai Thuli Mazhaithuli Mannil Sangamam", received full cheers from the audience.

Order	Contestant	Song sung after award given	Original artist	Lyricist	Music director	Movie (year)
	SS07 Saisharan	"Paatum Naane"	T. M. Soundararajan	Kannadasan	K. V. Mahadevan	Thiruvilaiyadal (1965)

==== Grand Final Results (Season 3) ====
Name	Position	Prize
Saicharan	Winner	Apartment worth 4 million rupees
Santhosh	First Runner-up	Car prize
Sathyaprakash	Second Runner-up	300,000 rupees cash prize
Pooja	Third Runner-up	100,000 rupees cash prize
Pravin Saivi	Best International Contestant	Bike prize
Nivas	Tough Wildcard Round Competitor	100,000 rupees cash prize

== Post finals ==
=== Vijay TV selected memorable moments (28 September 2011) ===
This episode, hosted by Divya, telecast various moments from the show which were selected by Vijay TV as memorable moments.

=== Scores and votes from finale (29 September 2011 – 30 September 2011) ===
Following the controversy caused by controversial comments made by permanent judge Srinivas during the series and particularly after the results were announced at the grand finale, the show held a two-episode "post finals" which revealed each judge's score at the grand finale, and the number of votes received for each of the grand final contestants.

During these episodes, Vijay TV host Divya confirmed the channel's commitment to respect viewer votes and wishes, although permanent judge Srinivas shouted that the judges and the TV channel actually wished to crown another contestant as the winner and another contestant as the runner-up.

==== Judges scores ====
Each of the judges at the grand finale scored the contestants or performances out of 20 marks. Prior to the announcement of the judges scores, playback singer Sunitha Sarathy who did not formally score the contestants confirmed that she felt winner Saicharan sang flawlessly.

Judge	Saicharan	Sathyaprakash	Santhosh	Pooja
Ranina Reddy	19.0	19.0	17.0	16.0
Vinaya Karthik Rajan	20.0	20.0	18.0	16.5
Anitha Karthikeyan	18.0	18.0	16.5	16.0
Pushpavanam Kuppusamy	18.0	16.0	15.0	14.5
Anitha Kuppusamy	18.0	16.0	15.0	14.0
Krishna Iyer	16.5	17.0	13.0	16.0
Kannan	17.0	17.5	15.0	14.5
Sangeetha Rajeshwaran	19.0	20.0	17.5	16.0
Unni Menon	18.0	19.0	17.0	17.0
S. P. Sailaja	17.0	18.0	14.0	15.0
Nithyasree Mahadevan	17.5	18.5	14.0	16.5
Manikka Vinayagam	17.0	19.0	16.0	17.0
Sriram Parthasarathy	17.0	18.0	14.0	14.0
Ramya NSK	18.5	20.0	16.0	15.0
T. L. Maharajen	16.5	18.5	15.0	16.0
Lavanya	18.0	20.0	14.0	16.0
Mahathi	17.0	20.0	14.0	16.0
Ajeesh	15.0	14.0	12.0	14.0
Priya Himesh	17.0	20.0	17.0	18.0
Velmurugan	16.0	18.0	16.0	16.0
Chinnaponnu	14.5	16.5	14.5	13.0
Maalathi	18.0	20.0	19.0	19.0
Malgudi Shubha	18.5	20.0	16.5	17.0
Mano	17.0	19.0	16.0	19.0
P. Unnikrishnan	17.0	18.0	15.0	16.0
Sujatha Mohan	18.5	20.0	14.5	16.0
Srinivas	16.5	19.0	12.0	15.5
Ananth Vaidyanathan	18.5	17.0	15.5	17.0
	488.5	516.0	434.0	447.5

==== Viewer votes ====
Viewers could also vote on their favourite performances and contestants through various methods.

Grand finalist	Airtel Subscriber Votes	SMS Votes	Online Votes	Total votes
Saicharan	115,446 (100,000 and 15,466)	192,886 (100,000 and 92,886)	58,676	367,008 (300,000 and 8 votes)
Sathyaprakash	17,864	106,214 (100,000 and 6,214)	38,023	162,101 (100,000 and 62,101 votes)
Santhosh	12,010	141,208 (100,000 and 41,208)	47,606	200,904 (200,000 and 904 votes)
Pooja	7,392	77,638	28,882	113,912 (100,000 and 13,912 votes)

==== Final results ====
Name	Position
Saicharan	First placed – Winner
Santhosh	Second placed – Runner-up
Sathyaprakash	Third placed
Pooja	Fourth placed

=== Super Singer Special (3 October 2011 – 13 October 2011) ===
These episodes hosted by Divya telecasted various special moments from the show, including interviews with contestants and judges, as well as bloopers from the season and previous seasons of the show. These episodes were leading up to season 3 of the junior version of the show, Airtel Super Singer Junior, which aired from 17 October 2011.

== Controversies ==
Airtel Super Singer Season 3 had the benefit of the greatest talent and musical personalities performing during the competitive and non-competitive rounds. However, the show was marred by constant controversies, with viewers and even contestants often outraged by the comments and the decisions made by the permanent judges in this season.

The first controversy arose when the permanent judges eliminated contestant Mathangi and leaving 16 other contestants to compete. Several contestants disputed the decision made by the judges immediately after the announcement, and viewers complained to Vijay TV. Previously, Mathangi was successfully crowned runner-up in Sun TV's Athiradi Singer in 2009, and winner in season 3 of S. P. Balasubrahmanyam's Ennodu Paattu Paadungal telecast on Jaya TV.

The second controversy arose from the very late introduction of international contestants purely for publicity. The show was heavily criticised for failing to introduce the international contestants earlier in the competition, as it became apparent that the international contestants were weeks behind in practice and experience on the show when compared with the local contestants. Many viewers accused the show of attempting to market the show overseas without making an effort to train and improve the international contestants so they could properly perform during the main competition rounds.

The third controversy arose after permanent host Divya Vijaygopal made suggestions during the episode telecast on 5 May 2011 that certain contestants were always in the danger zone and were not practising. Viewers called for Divya to be replaced as the show's television anchor, and felt her remarks were extremely inappropriate and unprofessional.
