= Lakshman Sruthi Orchestra =

Indian orchestra

The Lakshman Sruthi Orchestra is a orchestra based in Chennai. It was established in 1987 with 10 members. Since then, it has performed over 7,800 times in Tamil, Telugu, Malayalam, Kannada and Hindi, and has performed across the world. The orchestra maintains completely manual orchestration; it does not use synthesizers or any other electronic equipment.

== World record ==
The Lakshman Sruthi Orchestra was the first orchestra to carry out a 36-hour non-stop light music performance on 17–18 December 1994 at Kamarajar Arangam in Chennai, setting a world record in the process. The performance was inaugurated by Padmashree Dr. K. J. Yesudas and watched by an audience of 24,000 people. This audience included M. S. Viswanathan, T. K. Ramamoorthy, Isaignani Ilaiyaraaja, Shankar–Ganesh, Gangai Amaran, Isai Puyal, A. R. Rahman, T. Rajendar, R. Pandiarajan and Ramarajan.

== Special shows ==
As well as performing its own shows, the Lakshman Sruthi Orchestra also put on a show with the well-known playback singers Dr. K. J. Yesudas and Dr. S. P. Balasubramanyam performing together in Paris, France. This same combination was promoted all over the world, with a total of 14 stage shows so far.

At another time, a show made up of film music from the Carnatic music tradition was organized. This was presided over by N. S. K. Vaidhyanathan, Kadri Gopalnath, Nithyashree Mahadevan and Sowmya.

On 4 August 1996, a show was held for women only in Chennai at the Kamarajar Arangam.

The orchestra has frequently been involved in devotional music. For the last 14 years, they have performed completely devotional concerts, with free admission, especially for Ayyappan devotees.

In addition, the orchestra has performed large-scale gala shows in many countries around the world. These include Australia, France, Germany, Switzerland, USA, Canada and Denmark.

== Thematic shows ==
The Lakshman Sruthi Orchestra has also performed various thematic shows, including:

- Patriotic Songs (Organized for Kargil Relief Fund)
- Children's Special
- Lighting Special
- Pattikada Pattanama
- Natchathira Pattu Katchery
- Kaviarasu Kannadasan Hits
- Padmashree Vairamuthu Hits
- MGR Hits
- Sivaji Hits
- Rajini Hits
- Kamal Hits
- K. Balachander Hits
- Manirathnam Hits
- Mohan Hits
- Love Failure Hits
- One Man Show without Duet (by Dr. S. P. Balasubrahmanyam)

== International shows ==
Date	Guests	Country
26.03.1995	Suresh Peters, Shahul Hameed, Minmini, Sindhu, Charlee, Kasthuri, Kovai Sarala	Sri Lanka
27.01.1997	K. J. Yesudas, S. P. Balasubramanyam	Switzerland
08.05.1997	K. J. Yesudas, S. P. Balasubramanyam, Meena, Vichitra	Paris
09.05.1997	K. J. Yesudas, S. P. Balasubramanyam, Meena, Vichitra	Paris
04.04.1998	K. J. Yesudas, S. P. Balasubramanyam	Singapore Indoor Stadium
05.04.1998	K. J. Yesudas, S. P. Balasubramanyam	Malaysia
08.08.1998	Mano, K. S. Chithra	Singapore
19.11.1998	K. J. Yesudas, S. P. Balasubramanyam	Kuwait
31.08.1999	S. P. B. Charan, Anuradha Sriram, Manjula, Preetha Vijayakumar, Vanitha Vijayakumar	Switzerland
01.09.1999	S. P. B. Charan, Anuradha Sriram, Manjula, Preetha Vijayakumar, Vanitha Vijayakumar	Zürich
02.09.1999	S. P. B. Charan, Anuradha Sriram, Manjula, Preetha Vijayakumar, Vanitha Vijayakumar	Denmark
29.01.2000	K. J. Yesudas, S. P. Balasubramanyam, Anuradha Sriram, Sujatha Mohan, Vairamuthu	Sydney
30.01.2000	K. J. Yesudas, S. P. Balasubramanyam, Anuradha Sriram, Sujatha Mohan, Vairamuthu	Melbourne
01.04.2000	K. J. Yesudas, S. P. Balasubramanyam, S. P. B. Charan, Vijay Yesudas	Singapore
02.04.2000	S. P. Balasubramanyam, S. P. B. Charan	Johor Bahru Malaysia
10.05.2001	S. P. Balasubramanyam, Unni Menon, S. Janaki	Dubai
11.05.2001	S. P. Balasubramanyam, Unni Menon, S. Janaki	Sharjah
17.05.2001	S. P. Balasubramanyam, Unni Menon, S. Janaki	Bahrain
18.05.2001	S. P. Balasubramanyam, Unni Menon, S. Janaki	Qatar
31.08.2001	Srinivas, Vasundhara Das, Pop Shalini	Germany
02.09.2001	Srinivas, Vasundhara Das, Pop Shalini	Herning
04.05.2002	Gangai Amaran, Pushpavanam Kuppusamy, Unni Menon, Malgudi Subha, Pop Shalini, Manikka Vinayagam	Singapore
01.02.2003	Ramji, Chinni Jayanth, Mumtaj, Manikka Vinayagam	Singapore
19.07.2003	S. P. Balasubramanyam, Mano, Malgudi Subha	New Jersey
26.07.2003	S. P. Balasubramanyam, Mano, Malgudi Subha	Atlanta
27.07.2003	S. P. Balasubramanyam, Mano, Malgudi Subha	San Francisco
02.08.2003	S. P. Balasubramanyam, Srinivas	Toronto
03.08.2003	S. P. Balasubramanyam, Srinivas	Toronto
04.07.2004	Mano, Harish Raghavendra, Malathy Lakshman	Chicago
10.07.2004	Mano, Harish Raghavendra, Malathy Lakshman	Houston
11.07.2004	Man, Harish Raghavendra, Malathy Lakshman	New Jersey
17.07.2004	Mano, Harish Raghavendra, Malathy Lakshman	San Francisco
18.07.2004	Mano, Harish Raghavendra, Malathy Lakshman	San Francisco
24.07.2004	Mano, Harish Raghavendra, Malathy Lakshman	Toronto
31.07.2004	Mano, Harish Raghavendra, Malathy Lakshman	Columbus
01.08.2004	Mano, Harish Raghavendra, Malathy Lakshman	Detroit
08.08.2004	Mano, Harish Raghavendra, Malathy Lakshman	New York
01.07.2005	P. Unnikrishnan, Malathy Lakshman, Srilekha Parthasarathy, Madhumitha	Toronto
03.07.2005	Bharadwaj, Abdul Hameed, Unnikrishnan, Malathy Lakshman, Srilekha Parthasarathy, Madhumitha	Dallas
08.07.2005	Deva, Unnikrishnan, Malathy Lakshman, Srilekha Parthasarathy, Madhumitha	Houston
09.07.2005	Deva, Unnikrishnan, Malathy Lakshman, Srilekha Parthasarathy, Madhumitha	San Francisco
10.07.2005	Deva, Unnikrishnan, Malathy Lakshman, Srilekha Parthasarathy, Madhumitha	New Jersey
15.07.2005	Unnikrishnan, Malathy Lakshman, Srilekha Parthasarathy, Madhumitha	Los Angeles
16.07.2005	Unnikrishnan, Malathy Lakshman, Srilekha Parthasarathy, Madhumitha	Vancouver
17.07.2005	Unnikrishnan, Malathy Lakshman, Srilekha Parthasarathy, Madhumitha	Chicago
06.07.2006	Unni Menon, Sujatha Mohan, Vijay Adhiraj	Toronto
13.07.2007	Pandiarajan, Srinivas, Vijay Adhiraj, Malathy Lakshman, Pop Shalini	Toronto
16.07.2007	Pandiarajan and Lakshman - Comedy Act	Toronto
18.07.2007	Pandiarajan, Srinivas, Vijay Adhiraj, Malathy Lakshman, Pop Shalini	Toronto
21.07.2007	Pandiarajan, Srinivas, Vijay Adhiraj, Malathy Lakshman, Pop Shalini	Montreal
28.07.2007	Mano, Pandiarajan, Srinivas, Vijay Adhiraj, Malathy Lakshman Harini	Calgary
03.08.2007	Mano, Pandiarajan, Srinivas, Vijay Adhiraj, Malathy Lakshman, Harini	Dubai
02.11.2007	Malathy Lakshman	Kuwait
12.01.2008	Deepan Chakravarthy, Srinivas, Suchitra, Roshini	Zürich
10.05.2008	Mano, Nizhalgal Ravi, Malathy Lakshman, Suchitra	Dubai
14-11-2009	Malathy Lakshman	Zambia Africa
22-01-2010	Harish Raghavendra, Krish, Malathy Lakshman, Srilekha Parthasarathy, Suchithra	Qatar
22-01-2010	Harish Raghavendra, Krish, Malathy Lakshman, Srilekha Parthasarathy, Suchithra	Qatar
24-01-2010	Harish Raghavendra, Krish, Malathy Lakshman, Srilekha Parthasarathy	Zürich
21-05-2010	T.M.S. Selvakumar, Malathy Lakshman, Mahathi, Krish	Detroit
22-05-2010	T.M.S. Selvakumar, Malathy Lakshman, Mahathi, Krish	St. Louis
29-05-2010	T.M.S. Selvakumar, Malathy Lakshman, Mahathi, Krish	Philadelphia
30-05-2010	T.M.S. Selvakumar, Malathy Lakshman, Mahathi, Krish, Y. G. Mahendra	Philadelphia
04-06-2010	T.M.S. Selvakumar, Malathy Lakshman, Mahathi, Krish	Dallas
05-06-2010	T.M.S. Selvakumar, Malathy Lakshman, Mahathi, Krish	Houston
11-06-2010	T.M.S. Selvakumar, Malathy Lakshman, Mahathi, Krish	Columbia, South Carolina
12-06-2010	T.M.S. Selvakumar, Malathy Lakshman, Mahathi, Krish	Atlanta
13-06-2010	T.M.S. Selvakumar, Malathy Lakshman, Mahathi, Krish	San Francisco
14-11-2010	Madhu Balakrishnan, Suchitra, Roshini	Seychelles
31-10-2011	Krish, Haricharan, Malathy Lakshman, Saindhavi	Stuttgart
01-11-2011	Krish, Haricharan, Malathy Lakshman, Saindhavi	Paris
05-11-2010	Krish, Haricharan, Malathy Lakshman, Saindhavi	London
06-11-2011	Krish, Haricharan, Malathy Lakshman, Saindhavi	Zürich
07-04-2012	S. P. Balasubramanyam, Malathy Lakshman, Roshini	London
14-04-2012	S. P. Balasubramanyam, Malathy Lakshman, Roshini	Botswana

The Lakshman Sruthi Orchestra has also performed a mobile concert to raise funds and awareness for Gujarat earthquake relief.
