= Super Singer =

Super Singer may refer to:

- Super Singer (Bengali reality show)
- Super Singer (Tamil reality show):
  - Super Singer Junior
  - Super Singer T20
- Maa TV Super Singer
- Radio City Super Singer
