= Saisharan =

Sai Sharan
- Born: P. Sai Sharan; 16 October 1992 (age 33)
- Genres: Playback singing & Carnatic music
- Occupation: Musician
- Instrument: Vocalist
- Years active: 2011-present
- Label: Noizbloc

P. Sai Sharan is a Carnatic musician and Indian playback singer from Chennai, Tamil Nadu. He rose to prominence after winning Airtel Super Singer 3. He was previously a top 4 finalist in the debut season of the junior version of the show, Airtel Super Singer Junior.

== Early life ==
Saisharan started his music journey by giving his first Carnatic music concert at the age of 8 at the Thyagaraja Aradhana in Thiruvaiyaru.

== Television ==
Year	Name of television show	Role	Network
2024	Super Singer Season 10	Co-singer with contestant	Star Vijay

== Career ==
=== Television works ===
Saicharan competed in a number of reality TV singing competitions. He initially entered the finals of the debut season of Vijay TV's Airtel Super Singer Junior. He subsequently appeared as a member of the "Tiruchi Thimingalangal" team led by playback singer Srilekha Parthasarathy in the debut season of Sun TV's Sangeetha Mahayuddham, in which he and his team were crowned the runner up at the grand finale.

Saisharan rose to prominence in 2011 after being crowned the winner of season 3 of Vijay TV's Airtel Super Singer, when he was a 21 year old engineering student. Saicharan received training in Carnatic music prior to participating in the competition. He was previously a top 4 finalist in the debut season of the junior version of the show, Airtel Super Singer Junior. He auditioned for season 3 of the show, and participated in most of the main competition performance rounds. When he was eliminated from the competition by the permanent judges by half a mark, the decision was challenged by viewers. He subsequently qualified as a wildcard contestant, and re-entered the competition as a grand finalist after receiving the highest number of viewer votes.

Saicharan was crowned the winner of the competition, and was awarded an apartment by the show's sponsor Arun Excello. He was chosen by A. R. Rahman and D. Imman to sing in the 2012 films Godfather, Manam Kothi Paravai, and Saattai.

In 2013, Saicharan captained the "Symphony Super Kings" team in the debut season of Airtel Super Singer T20, before he and his team were crowned the winner of the show. In 2015, Saisharan also captained his "White Devils" team to victory in Super Singer T20 season 2. His performances through Vijay TV's Super Singer TV series which were considered hits by viewers have included:

Show season	Original air date	Round name	Song title	Original film	Language	Music director	Lyricist
Airtel Super Singer 3	4–8 July 2011	Devotional	Isai Thamizh Nee Seidha	Thiruvilaiyadal	Tamil	K. V. Mahadevan	Kannadasan
Airtel Super Singer T20	18 January 2013	Semi Finals - Captain's Challenge	Unnai Kaanaadhu Naan	Vishwaroopam	Tamil	Shankar–Ehsaan–Loy	Kamal Haasan
Super Singer T20 (S2)	18 March 2015	MSV Hits	Harmony Medley (excerpts of raga Kiravani; "Ninaipadhellam"; "Mayakkamma" & "Malarndhum")	Traditional Carnatic music Nenjil Or Aalayam; Sumaithaangi; & Pasamalar	Tamil	Viswanathan–Ramamoorthy	Kannadasan
Super Singer T20 (S2)	1 April 2015	ARR Songs	Oru Poiyaavadhu Sol Kanne	Jodi	Tamil	A. R. Rahman	Vairamuthu
Super Singer T20 (S2)	9 April 2015	1960 to 1980	Pattum Naane	Thiruvilaiyadal	Tamil	K. V. Mahadevan	Kannadasan
Super Singer T20 (S2)	10 April 2015	1960 to 1980	Harmony Medley (excerpts of "Paruvame Pudhiya Paadal" & "Uravugal Thodarkathai")	Nenjathai Killathe & Aval Appadithan	Tamil	Ilaiyaraaja	Panchu Arunachalam & Gangai Amaran
Super Singer T20 (S2)	28 April 2015	Post-2001	Unakkena Iruppaen	Kaadhal	Tamil	Joshua Sridhar	Na. Muthukumar
Super Singer T20 (S2)	28 April 2015	Post-2001	A cappella Harmony	various	no lyrics	various	no lyrics
Super Singer T20 (S2)	12 May 2015	Semifinal 1	excerpts of raga Vasantha/Hamsanandi; Vandhanam En & Kandaen Kandaen	Traditional Carnatic music; Vazhvey Maayam & Pirivom Santhippom	Tamil	Saisharan; Gangai Amaran; & Vidyasagar	Traditional Carnatic music; Vaali; & Yugabharathi

=== Playback singing ===
In 2012, Sai Sharan was formally introduced as a Tamil playback singer. He made his film debut co-singing "Dang Dang" in the movie Manam Kothi Paravai with Malavika, who was also a contestant in the music competition reality TV show, Airtel Super Singer 3.

Year	Song title	Film name	Language	Music director
2012	Dang Dang	Manam Kothi Paravai	Tamil	D. Imman
2012	Nanbaa va Nanbaa	Saattai	Tamil	D. Imman
2013	Ari Unnai	Vathikuchi	Tamil	M Ghibran
2013	Manasukulle Yennai Edho	Gnabagangal Thaalattum	Tamil	Mano Murthy & Kamalakar
2014	Unmanam	Gubeer	Tamil	Vishal - Adithya
2014	Unnai Kadhalithu	Nadhigal Nanaivadhillai	Tamil	Soundaryan
2015	Yei Nanbaa	Viraivil Isai	Tamil	MS Ram
2015	Paadukunte	Jilla	Telugu	D. Imman
2015	Nizhala Nijama	Vellaiya Irukiravan Poi Solla Maatan	Tamil	Joshua Sridhar
2015	Run	Bruce Lee - The Fighter	Telugu	S. Thaman
2016	Othasada Rosa	Marudhu	Tamil	D. Imman
2016	Aattam Pottu	Vetrivel	Tamil	D. Imman
2017	Chilaka Chilaka	Pelliroju	Telugu	Justin Prabhakaran
2018	Hey Reengara	Oru Nalla Naal Paathu Solren	Tamil	Justin Prabhakaran
2021	Katti Karumbe	Aanandam Vilaiyadum Veedu	Tamil	Siddhu Kumar
2021	Ooril Oru Raaja	Yuvarathnaa	Tamil	S. Thaman
2023	Anti Bikili Theme	Pichaikkaran 2	Tamil	Vijay Antony
