= Gubeer =

2014 Indian film by Thilipkumar

- Theatrical release poster
- Directed by: Thilip
- Written by: Thilip
- Produced by: Archer Cinemas
- Starring: Thilip; Ravi; White; Tamil; Pratap; Prabhu; Bower
- Cinematography: Santhosh Sriram
- Edited by: Kiran KN
- Music by: Vishal-Aditya
- Distributed by: Archer Cinemas
- Release date: 10 October 2014
- Running time: 119 minutes
- Country: India
- Language: Tamil

Gubeer (transl. Cheers) is a 2014 Tamil-language black comedy film, written and directed by Thilipkumar Rajendren and produced by Archer Cinemas. The plot focuses on the experiences of several men looking for a weekend of entertainment. The movie was originally released exclusively in Tamil Nadu. At the film's debut, it received a positive critical response, with particular praise for its novel structure and narrative.

== Plot ==
This is the story of a group of people looking to 'paint the town red'; conveying their thoughts over a 24-hour period; all recounted with (apparent) arbitrariness. While it features slapstick, it makes some serious points.

== Cast ==
The film crew of the movie consists of 5 friends, who worked for the same IT company. After resigning, these youngsters joined together for a film venture and starred in this movie.

The cast includes White, Tamil, Ravi and Prathap. Prabhu acts as the owner. Along with them, a pet dog by the name Bower is present.

- Thilip as Thilip
- Ravi as Ravi
- White as White
- Tamil as Tamil
- Pratap as Pratap
- Prabhu as Prabhu
- Rajiv as Cop
- Aadhi as Cop
- Manjo as Manoj
- Bower as Bower

== Production ==
Thilip started writing the script in January 2013. He started shooting on 16 April 2013. The movie was shot in 19 days. Post production took place during the second half of 2013. Gubeer cleared Central Board of Film Certification with 'A' on 31 March 2014. The production was funded by Thiagarajar College of Engineering alumnus and other friends of Thilip. Gubeer is also a partially crowdfunded movie.

== Soundtrack ==
Gubeer

Soundtrack album by Vishal-Aditya
- Released: 1 February 2014
- Recorded: Auro Studio, Chennai
- Genre: Feature film soundtrack
- Length: 27:46
- Label: Saregama

The soundtrack was composed by Vishal-Aditya and the album was released on 1 February 2014. The Audio was launched by Karthik Subbaraj and Balaji Tharaneetharan. The Gubeer soundtrack consists of 8 songs.

No.	Song	Singers	Lyrics	Length (min:sec)
1	"Gubeer"	Naresh Iyer	Karthikeyan	03:51
2	"Unmanam - Film Version"	Saicharan	Karthikeyan	03:19
3	"Life-Rap"	Brodha V	Karthikeyan	03:30
4	"Chennai Instrumental"	None	None	01:53
5	"Unmanam - Dubstep"	Vishal, Aditya	Karthikeyan	04:10
6	"Penne"	Aditya	Karthikeyan	04:41
7	"Unmanam"	Saicharan	Karthikeyan	03:11
8	"Veerathuku Madurai"	Velmurugan	Karthikeyan	03:08

== Critical reception ==
The film received critical acclaim. Karthi of Dinamalar wrote, "A Royal salute to Gubeer Team. All lead actors were good. Overall, Gubeer is upset to commercial film makers in Kollywood. Inspiring and interesting to people who love cult films." Malini Mannath of The New Indian Express wrote, "Creative, bold and experimental, Gubeer is worth a watch".

== Release ==
Gubeer had a limited theatrical release on 10 October in Tamil Nadu. Archer cinemas stopped showing the movie one day after its release.
