= Diwakar (disambiguation) =

Diwakar may refer to:

- Diwakar, Indian playback singer
- Diwakar Prasad, Indian former amateur boxer
- Diwakar Pundir, Indian actor
