= Madhu Iyer =

Indian playback singer (b. 1984)

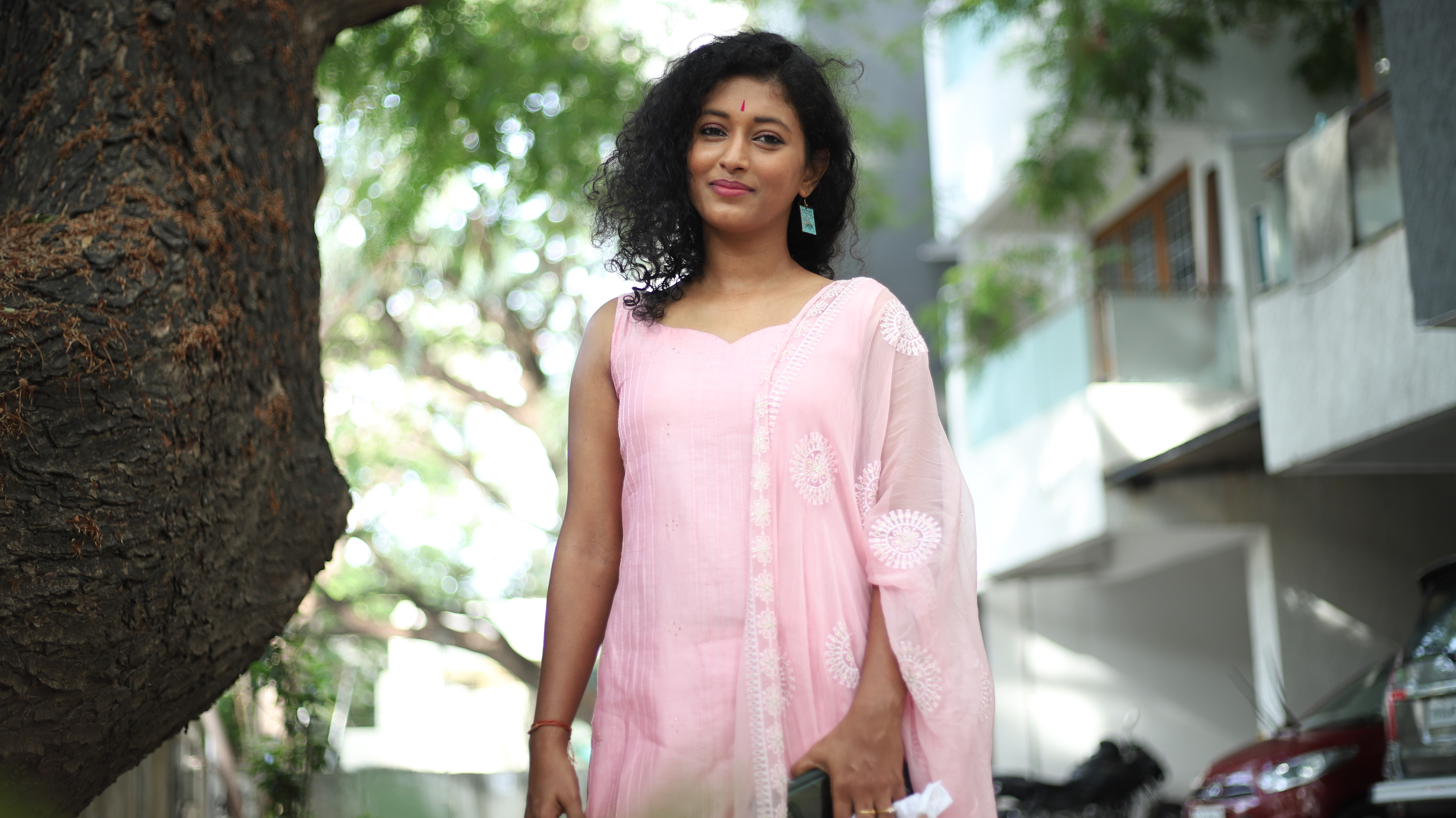
- Madhu Iyer in 2022
- Education: Queen Mary's College, Chennai
- Occupation: Singer
- Years active: 2011–present
- Spouse: Aravind Rajagopalan (m. 2013)
- Awards: See below
- Musical career
- Genres: Indian classical; bhajan; electronic
- Instrument: Vocals
- Website: madhuiyer.com

Madhu Iyer is an Indian playback singer. She has recorded songs for films and albums in various Indian languages and has established herself as a known playback singer of South Indian cinema. Madhu aspired to become a playback singer from an early age. At the age of four, she started performing on stages. Apart from playback singing, Madhu performs in musical concerts around the world. She also appears in music videos. She produces her own music videos and teaches Carnatic music.

== Early and personal life ==
Madhu Iyer was known as Madhumitha Srinivasan during her early years and personal life. Born with a brother and a sister, Madhu was supported by her family during her journey in music. Madhu married Aravind Rajagopalan in 2013 and has two children Ekalaya and Aarathana. Madhu and family are living in Chennai, Tamil Nadu, India.

== Education and Music Training ==
Madhu Iyer had her high school education at Sir Siva Swami Kalalaya and Sri Sankara Senior Secondary School in Chennai. She completed Bachelor's degree in music at Queen Mary's College, Chennai, India. She also completed a Master's degree in human resource management. Madhu Iyer was awarded prestigious title Sangeetha Vidwat Bhushana by well respected Madras Music Academy after completing advanced Carnatic music diploma course successfully. Madhu Iyer received her specialized education in Carnatic music from guru Vasanth Kumar and learning Carnatic and Hindustani music from Shri. Sriram Parasuram. Also, Madhu completed keyboard training from Trinity Laban Conservatoire of Music and Dance, London, UK with Trinity topper award. Madhu Iyer is fluent in Tamil, English, Hindi and Sanskrit languages.

== Career ==
Madhu Iyer became known in Tamil music world when she was selected as the best performer in music competition broadcast by Vijay TV entitled Apoorva Ragangal, & later on also in Super Singer T20. Later she became more popular in 2011 when she was selected to the final list of Airtel Super Singer 3. Madhu Iyer caught the attention of legendary music director and singer Ilaiyaraaja, and Yuvan Shankar Raja, another popular music director. Ilaiyaraaja provided opportunities to Madhu in concerts he conducted in Canada, U.S.A, England and Singapore. Madhu Iyer was nominated for the Best Female Playback Singer Award for her song Sethupochu Manasu presented by Ananda Vikatan Cinema Awards in 2019. The song from the Mammooty movie Peranbu with music directed by Yuvan Shankar Raja became very popular. Madhu Iyer also sang for movies Oru Kuppai Kathai, Savarakathi, Azhagu Kutti Chellam, Amara Kaaviyam and Kaadu (2014 film).

== Filmography ==
| Year | Film | Song | Composer | Language |
|---|---|---|---|---|
| 2023 | Let's Get Married | Tikki Tikki Tata | Ramesh Thamilmani | Tamil |
| 2022 | Kalaga Thalaivan | Neeladho | Arrol Corelli | Tamil |
| 2019 | Peranbu | Sethupochu Manasu | Saregama | Tamil |
| 2018 | Savarakathi | Annaanthu Paar | Arrol Corelli | Tamil |
| 2018 | Oru Kuppai Kathai | Mazhai Pozhindhidum | Think Music | Tamil |
| 2016 | Azhagu Kutti Chellam | Thiruvasagam | Think Music | Tamil |
| 2014 | Amara Kaaviyam | Dheva Dhevadhai | Ghibran | Tamil |
| 2014 | Kaadu (2014 film) | Uyire | K (composer) | Tamil |

== Awards and Prestigious Performances ==
So far Madhu Iyer was known to have received the following awards and had opportunities for the listed prestigious performances.

- Recipient of “Jayamalika” award for young achievers by the Jayadharini Trust.
- Recipient of “Raadhu” award by Raadhu foundation presented by Shri. Ashok Ramani.
- Performed in the presence of “Bharat Ratna” Dr. M. S. Subbulakshmi and received a Saraswathi idol as a memento of appreciation.
- One of the top 5 best voices recognized by Airtel Super Singer 3 / Vijay TV (Season 2 and 3- 2011 and 2013).
- Awarded “Maharajapuram Santhanam Award” by Narada Gana Sabha for best Carnatic vocalist in 2014.
- Performed at the Madras Music Academy for RADEL mid-year concerts (2018) after getting selected through auditions.
- Grade artist of ALL INDIA RADIO.
