= Oru Kuppai Kathai =

- Theatrical release poster
- Directed by: Kaali Rangasamy
- Written by: Kaali Rangasamy
- Produced by: Ramadhoss; Aravindan; Mohammed Aslam
- Starring: Dinesh; Manisha Yadav
- Cinematography: Mahesh Muthuswami
- Edited by: Gopi Krishna
- Music by: Joshua Sridhar
- Production company: Film Box
- Distributed by: Red Giant Movies
- Release date: 25 May 2018
- Country: India
- Language: Tamil

Oru Kuppai Kathai (transl. A Garbage Story) is a 2018 Indian Tamil-language drama film produced by Ramadhoss, Aravindan, and Aslam. It was written and directed by debutant Kaali Rangaswamy. The film stars dance choreographer Dinesh, in his debut as lead actor, and Manisha Yadav. The film's music was composed by Joshua Sridhar with cinematography by Mahesh Muthuswami and editing by Gopi Krishna. The film was released on 25 May 2018.

== Plot ==
Kumar is a poor garbage collector from the slums of Chennai who is in search for a bride. But many brides reject him due to his love and passion towards garbage collecting. One day, he meets Poongodi, a girl from a middle class family in Valparai whose father lied to her that Kumar is a clerk. Poongodi, who believes that Kumar is a clerk, decides to marry him and settle in Chennai. Weeks after marriage, Poongodi discovers that Kumar is not a clerk but a garbage collector, causing a hatred towards him. Kumar tries to make things right by shifting from the slums to an apartment with family, including their newborn baby girl.

In the apartment, Kumar befriends his neighbour Arjun, a software developer who has been helping him shift to their new home. However, months after shifting, Poongodi and Arjun later start developing feelings for each other and start a romantic and extramarital affair. Meanwhile, Kumar decides to resign as a garbage collector for Poongodi's sake and decides to surprise her with the news, but later, he realises that she and their baby are not at home. Later, the watchman tells him that Poongodi is having an affair with Arjun and that she might have eloped with him somewhere far away, leaving Kumar in shock and depression. Kumar refuses to believe it and goes to Poongodi's house in Valparai believing that Poongodi should've gone there, but he does not find Poongodi there breaking the last string of hope that he had.

Kumar has a hard time coping up with his wife's betrayal and his mother's death whereas Poongodi moves in with Arjun with the hope of starting a new life. In a few days, she becomes aware of Arjun's true colours. Arjun is a playboy who takes Poongodi with no intentions of marrying her. When Arjun's father finds out about this he lectures him and advises him to send Poongodi back to her husband. But Arjun lies to Poongodi and leaves her with his friend. Arjun's friend tries to lure Poongodi into sleeping with him and when she refuses he spites her about her actions. He gives her some time to rethink her decision and when her answer is still a no, he tries to rape her.

Later the same day, Kumar visits Poongodi's house and tells her of the happenings on his end. He reunites with his daughter and assures Poongodi that he has not come to take her away with him when he notices a blood covered knife on the floor. A startled Kumar starts going about the house when he finds a stabbed man in the kitchen. Poongodi breaks down and confesses everything that happened and it is revealed that Poongodi stabbed Arjun's friend in self defence when he tried to rape her. Kumar comes up with a solution that he will own up for the murder and Poongodi can go back to their house in the slums and raise their child with the support from his people there. A repentant Poongodi falls at his feet and reluctantly agrees. She promises Kumar that she will not disclose the truth with anyone.

Kumar goes to the Police and surrenders whereas, Poongodi goes back to the slums where she is gladly accepted by the people. In the end, a remorseful Poongodi is shown to be wearing Kumar's uniform and sweeping the streets of chennai (as a street sweeper).

== Cast ==
- Dinesh as Kumar
- Manisha Yadav as Poongodi
- Sujo Mathew as Arjun
- Yogi Babu as Kumar's friend
- George Maryan as Poongodi's father
- Aadhira Pandilakshmi as Kumar's mother
- Kiran

== Soundtrack ==
The soundtrack was composed by Joshua Sridhar and lyrics written by Na. Muthukumar & Sulaiman Fazil. The audio was released under Think Music.

- "Vilagadhe Enadhuyire" – Haricharan
- "Ninaithadhu Ellam" – Saicharan
- "Vaa Machi" – Velumurugan
- "Kuppai Vandiyil" – Saicharan
- "Mazhai Pozhindhidum" – Madhu Iyer

== Critical reception ==
The Times of India wrote "Director Kaali Rangasami has in his hands a good script, and almost succeeds in narrating a true-to-life story." The Hindu wrote "Director Kaali Rangasamy's Oru Kuppai Kadhai would have made a better book than a film. The storyline is enough to keep you interested." The News Minute wrote "The film's title Oru Kuppai Kathai perhaps alludes to its flawed characters but falls short of leaving an impact." Sify wrote "Overall, Oru Kuppa Kathai is a topical subject that deals with the extramarital affair and its pitfalls. The first half is ok, it is second half which becomes like a never ending serial." Baradwaj Rangan wrote, "An inconsistent story about a wife who strays is redeemed by its compassion".
