= Sangeetha Mahayuddham =

- Country of origin: India
- Original language: Tamil

Production
- Production locations: Tamil Nadu, India
- Running time: 1 hour
- Production company: Saibaba Telefilms Pvt. Ltd

Original release
- Network: Sun TV; Sun TV HD
- Release: 19 June 2010 – 25 November 2012

Sangeetha Mahayuddham, also known as Amul Sangeetha Mahayuddham, is a 2010–2012 Indian reality TV singing competition in the Tamil language that was broadcast on Sun TV.

The show features 6 Indian playback singers who lead their teams of contestants to compete against each other team with a view of winning the Sangeeta Mahayuddham Champion Trophy.

== Season 1 ==
The debut season of the show premiered on 19 June 2010, and was hosted by playback singer Chinmayi. The show was telecast on weekend nights.

=== Teams (season 1) ===
==== Thanjai Thalapathigal ====
The "Thanjai Thalapathigal" team consisted of:

1. Madhu Balakrishnan (playback singer team captain)
2. Suchithra
3. Kaviya, was 11 years old at the time of the show.
4. Bharath

==== Tirichy Thimingalangal ====
The "Tirichy Thimingalangal" team consisted of:

1. Srilekha Parthasarathy (playback singer team captain)
2. Saisharan, a finalist of Vijay TV's debut season of Airtel Super Singer Junior, and title winner of Airtel super singer senior.
3. Vignesh, runner up of Vijay TV's debut season of Airtel Super Singer Junior.
4. Manasi, winner of Sun TV's Athiradi Singer.

==== Nellai Sooraveli ====
The "Nellai Sooraveli" team consisted of:

1. Annupamaa (playback singer team captain)
2. Kousshik Ram
3. Krishnamoorthy, winner of Vijay TV's debut season of Airtel Super Singer Junior.
4. Monissha

==== Madurai Veerargal ====
The "Madurai Veerargal" team consisted of:

1. Vijay Yesudas (playback singer team captain)
2. Guruprasad
3. Srisha
4. Anakah

==== Chennai Singangal ====
The "Chennai Singangal" team consisted of:

1. Devan Ekambaram (playback singer team captain)
2. Gurupriya
3. Aishwarya
4. Sasinprabhu

==== Kovai Killadigal ====
The "Kovai Killadigal" team consisted of:

1. Mathangi Jagdish (playback singer team captain)
2. Al Rufian
3. Bhargavi
4. Sathyanarayanan

=== Grand Finale (season 1) ===
The teams selected for the finale were Srilekha's Tiruchi Thimingalangal and Madhu's Thanjai Thalapathigal.

Srilekha's team members were Saisharan, Vignesh and Manasi, of which Saisharan and Vignesh appeared on music competition reality shows aired on Vijay TV, and Manasi appeared on a music competition reality show aired earlier on Sun TV. Madhu led Suchithra, Kavya and Bharath into the battle.

A special jury consisting of eminent personalities from the Tamil music industry including Vani Jairam judged the finale.

==== Finale Result (season 1) ====
The Thanjai Thalapathigal team led by playback singer Madhu Balakrishnan won the competition.

== Season 2 ==
The second season of the show premiered on 30 October 2010. Auditions took place in various cities across Tamil Nadu in November 2010. Playback singer and host of season 1, Chinmayi, announced she would not return to host the show for the subsequent season. Her replacement host was playback singer and season 1 captain-contestant, Mathangi Jagdish, Grand Finale on 25 November 2012.

=== Teams (season 2) ===
==== Isai Sooravaligal ====
The "Isai Sooravaligal" team consisted of:

1. Grace Karunas (playback singer team captain)
2. Divyasri
3. Febin
4. Deepthi

==== Raaga Deepangal ====
The "Raaga Deepangal" team consisted of:

1. Ranjith (playback singer team captain)
2. Surach
3. ~~Preethi~~ Bhargavi
4. Ovviya

==== Paayum Puligal ====
The "Paayum Puligal" team consisted of:

1. Prasanna (playback singer team captain)
2. Diwakar
3. Madhumitha Shankar
4. Srisha

==== Singa Kutties ====
The "Singa Kutties" team consisted of:

1. Sunitha Sarathy (playback singer team captain)
2. Roshini
3. Guna
4. Mukundh

==== Sangeetha Sudargal ====
The "Sangeetha Sudargal" team consisted of:

1. Rahul Nambiar (playback singer team captain)
2. Ajay
3. Kirthika
4. Sarath

==== Paatu Thimingalangal ====
The "Paatu Thimingalangal" team consisted of:

1. Naveen (playback singer team captain and son of Raveendran)
2. Karthik
3. Shruthi
4. Malvika Sundaresan
