= Super Singer 4 =

- Season 4
- Presented by: Makapa Anand, Priyanka Deshpande, Bhavana
- Judges: Sujatha Mohan, Mano, Unnikrishnan, Srinivas

Release
- Original network: STAR Vijay
- Original release: 4 February 2013 – 1 February 2014

Season chronology
- ← Previous; Super Singer 3 Next → Super Singer 5

Airtel Super Singer 4, the fourth season of Airtel Super Singer, premiered on 4 February 2013. The show was a reality-based Indian singing competition in Tamil that aired on STAR Vijay. It was designed to be a talent hunt to find the best voice of Tamil Nadu. Judges for the auditions were Ananth Vaidyanathan, S.P. Sailaja, Devan Ekambaram, Nithyasree Mahadevan, Mahathi, Pop Shalini, S. Sowmya, Mano and Malgudi Subha. Some of these judges along with other noted musicians reappeared as Guest judges. To name a few- S. Janaki, M. S. Viswanathan, A. R. Rahman, P. Susheela, Asha Bhosle, S. P. Balasubrahmanyam, Vairamuthu, L. R. Eswari and Vani Jairam. Judges for the main competition were Sujatha, Mano, Unnikrishnan and Srinivas. Makapa Anand, Priyanka Deshpande, and Bhavana were the hosts for the show. The voice trainer was Ananth Vaidyanathan. The show aired on weekdays at 9:00 pm IST.

== Auditions ==
The auditions for the show were held at three zones, Trichy, Kovai and Chennai in December 2012 and January 2013. Thousands of applicants aged above 16 participated in the zonal auditions. The judges for the preliminary auditions included eminent singers from the music industry and popular contestants from the previous seasons of the show. The show premiered in February 2013 featuring the audition phases from various zones.

== Direct finalists ==
1. Diwakar
2. Parvathy
3. Syed Subahan

== Wild card round winners ==
1. Sarath Santhosh
2. Sonia Aamod

== Finalists ==
1. Diwakar (winner)
2. Parvathy
3. Syed Subahan
4. Sarath Santhosh
5. Sonia Aamod

== Grand Finale ==
The final contest to decide the winner of the show was held at Sun Palm Driving Range & Golf Academy, Guindy and was telecast live on television and internet on 1 February 2014. Winners were selected by audience poll. Votes could be cast through SMS, IVR and online. After two performances by each contestant, Diwakar was declared as the winner and received an apartment worth Rs. 6 million as prize. Syed Subahan was declared as Judges Choice Winner for the best performance in Grand Finale and 1st runner-up as he got the second maximum votes of audience. Syed got 1 kg of Gold for 1st runner-up. The second runner-up Sarath Santhosh received Rs. 1 million. The other two contestants Sonia Aamod and Parvathy received Rs. 500,000 each.

Many prominent singers were present at the venue. Legendary singer S. Janaki was the chief-guest for the event. Makapa Anand, Priyanka, and Bhavana hosted the show.

== Elimination chart ==
Legend
| Did Not Perform | Female | Male | Airtel Super Singer 4 |

| Safe | Spot selected (Spot) | Wait listed (WL) or Danger zone (DZ) | Eliminated (Elim) | Promoted by judges (P) | Immunity (I) | Top performer(T) |

| Genre: | | Love Songs Round | Fast Duet Round | Free Style Round | Tribute to the Legends | Folk Songs Round | Multilingual Songs Round | Western Round | Kalluri Salai Round | Mabbu Songs Round | Dance Attack Round | Super Singer Stars |
| Week: | | May 20 | May 27 | June 3 | June 10 | June 17 | June 28 | July 5 | July 12 | July 19 | July 26 | August 2 |
| Place | Contestant | Result | | | | | | | | | | |
| 1 | Diwakar | | | | | | | | | | | |
| 2 | Syed Subahan | | | | | | | | | | | |
| 3 | Sharath | | | | | | | | | | | T |
| 4 | Parvathy | | | | | | | | | | T | |
| 5 | Soniya | | | P | | | P | | | | | |
| 6 | Aravind Srinivas | | | | | | | | | | | DZ |
| 7 | Madhumita | | | | | | | | | | | DZ |
| 8 | Narayanan | | | | | | | | | | | DZ |
| 9 | Ganesh | | | | | | | | | | | |
| 10 | Sai Vignesh | | | | | | | | | | | |
| 11 | Vaishali | | | | | | | | | DZ | DZ | |
| 12 | Rizwan | | | | | | | | | | | |
| 13 | Deepti | | | | | | | | | | DZ | |
| 14 | Vaijayanthi | | | | | | DZ | | | | | |
| 15 | Sanjay | | | | | | | | | | | DZ |
| 16 | Shenbagaraj | | | | | | | | | | | |
| 17 | Soundarya Bala Nandakumar | | | | | | | | | | | |
| 18 | Nirjhari | | | | | | | | DZ | | | |
| 19 | Krishnan | | | | | | | | | | | |
| 20 | Mahitha | | | | | | | DZ | | | | |
| 21 | Ramesh | | | | | | | DZ | DZ | | | |
| 22 | Niranjana | | | | | | | | | T | | |
| 23 | Alagesan | | | | | | | | DZ | | DZ | |
| 24 | Namitha | | | | | | | | DZ | DZ | DZ | |
| 25 | Rajagopalan | DZ | DZ | | | | | | | | DZ | Elim |
| 26 | Sai Shankar | | | | DZ | DZ | | | | DZ | Elim | |
| 27 | Vignesh | | | | | | | DZ | | Elim | | |
| 28 | Sahil | | | | | | | | Elim | | | |
| 29 | Sherley | | | | | | Elim | | | | | |
| 30 | Arvind | | | | | Elim | | | | | | |
| 31 | Thirupurasundari | | | | Elim | | | | | | | |
| 32 | Ramnath | | Elim | | | | | | | | | |
| 33 | Rafiq | Elim | | | | | | | | | | |
