= Diwakar =

Indian singer (born 1990)

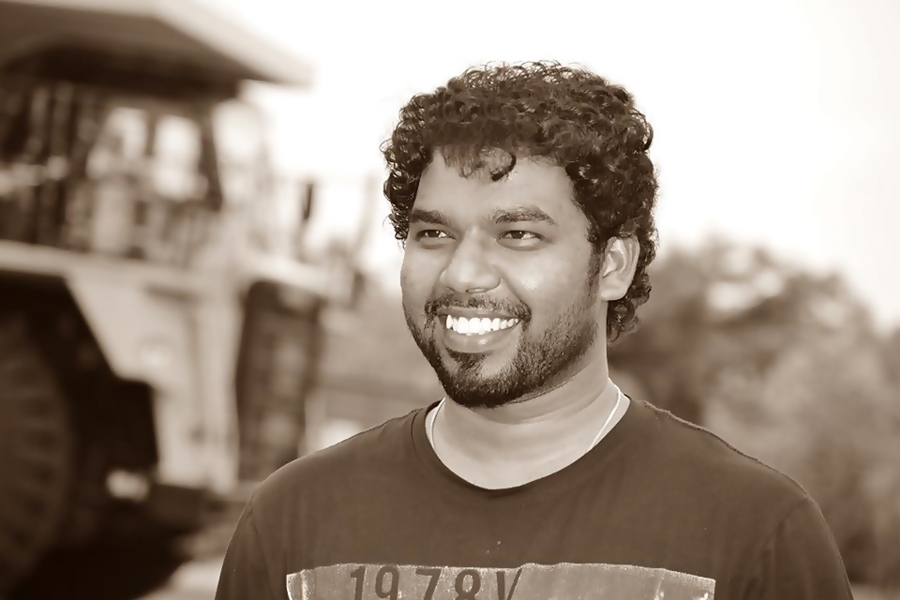
- Born: 26 January 1990 (age 36)
- Occupations: Playback Singer, Live Performer
- Years active: 2014 to present

Dhivagaran Santhosh (also known as Diwakar) is an Indian playback singer and live performer. He is best known for winning Airtel Super Singer 4, a Tamil language musical reality TV show which was telecast from February 4th 2013 to February 1st 2014 on Vijay TV.

== Career ==
=== Television works ===
Diwakar participated in various reality TV musical competitions telecast on various Tamil language TV channels, including Zee Tamil's Sa Re Ga Ma Pa 2009 Challenge, Jaya TV's Hariyudan Naan, and season 2 of Sun TV's Sangeetha Mahayuddham. In 2012, Diwakar was crowned runner up in Raj TV's Voice of Tamil Nadu.

On 1 February 2014, he was crowned the winner of season 4 of the Airtel Super Singer music competition telecast on Vijay TV, having received the greatest number of viewer votes. During the show's grand finale, Diwakar's performance of the song "Neeye Unakku Endrum" from the film Bale Pandiya prompted a standing ovation from the audience and a kiss on his forehead from playback singer, S. Janaki.

=== Playback singing and recordings ===
Diwakar recorded his first song as a playback singer for music director D. Imman for the movie 'Panchu Mittai'. However, his voice as a playback singer was first released in the Tamil language movie, Vadacurry, for a song co-sung by playback singers Vijay Prakash and Ajeesh.

== Television ==
Year	Title	Role	Notes	Ref
2013-2014	Airtel Super Singer 4	Contestant	Winner	
2020	Super Singer Champion of Champions	Contestant	Finalist	
2020	Mr and Mrs Chinnathirai	Contestant alongside Wife	Eliminated	
2022	Super Singer Junior (Season 8)	Guest	"Starwars Round "- Sang with Srimathi	
2024	Super Singer 10	Guest performer	"Isai Puyal Hits Round" - Sang with Lincy	

== Film songs ==
Year	Film name	Language	Song title	Music director
2014	Vadacurry	Tamil	"Nenjukkula Nee"	Vivek-Mervin
2014	Kalkandu	Tamil	"Kannoramai"	Kannan
2015	Panjumittai	Tamil	"My Wifeu Romba Beautifulu"	D. Imman
2015	Purampokku	Tamil	"Marina Beachula"	Varshan
2015	Purampokku	Tamil	"Kalasi Kalasi"	Varshan
2015	Rajini Murugan	Tamil	"Jigiru Jigiru"	D. Imman
2015	Pugazh	Tamil	"Naanga Podiyan"	Vivek-Mervin
2015	Paayum Puli	Tamil	"Marudakaari vaadi"	D. Imman
2016	Adra Machan Visilu	Tamil	"Thalaivan Purantha Naalu"	N. R. Raghunanthan
2016	Rum	Tamil	"Pori Paththi Vizhum"	Anirudh Ravichander
2017	Kaatru Veliyidai	Tamil	"Tango Kelaayo"	A. R. Rahman
2017	Yagan	Tamil	"Aarathi Kaattu"	Niro Pirabakaran
2017	Karuppan	Tamil	"Muruku Meesai Mama"	D. Imman
2017	Thondan	Tamil	"Thondan Thondan"	Justin Prabhakaran
2017	Visiri	Tamil	"Ore vaanam oru thalathaan"	Sekar Sai Bharath
2017	Visiri	Tamil	"Thalayum Thalapathiyum"	Dhanraj Manickam
2017	Mental Madhilo	Telugu	"Bagundaya Chandram"	Prashanth R Vihari
2018	Yaar Ivargal	Tamil	"Pora Pora"	Javed Riaz
2018	Chi La Sow	Telugu	"Solo Solo"	Prashanth R. Vihari
2018	Chi La Sow	Telugu	"Chi La Sow"	Prashanth R Vihari
2018	Seemaraja	Tamil	"Vaaren Vaaren Seemaraja"	D. Imman
2018	Dha Dha 87	Tamil	"Wine Kannala"	Leander Lee Marty
2019	LKG	Tamil	"Ini Oru Vidhi Seivom"	Leon James
2019	Karuppu Durai	Tamil	"Adi Adi Adi Aathi"	Karthikeya Murthy
2019	Kanchana 3	Tamil	"Ketta Paya Saar"	Bharath Madhusudhanan
2019	Viswasam	Telugu	"Danchi Kottu"	D Imman
2019	Sangathamizhan	Tamil	"Innum Vera Enna Venume"	Vivek - Mervin
2020	Naan Sirithal	Tamil	"Happy Birthday"	Hiphop Tamizha
2020	Athigaari	Tamil	"Agalathey Vilagathey"	Shameshan Mani Maran
2020	Oththaikku Oththa	Tamil	"8 Mani Bus’su Kulla"	Justin Prabhakaran
2023	Rudhran	Tamil	"Pagai Mudi"	GV Prakash Kumar

== Albums ==
Year	Song	Composer	Album name	Notes
2017	Thanimaiyile	Surya Prasadh R	En Kaalgal	
2016	Pogadhae	Simeon Telfer	Pogadhae	
2015	Chennaiyile - The Rhythm of Chennai	Ganesh Chandrasekaran	U - The Epitome of Love	To be Re-Released
2015	En Vizhigalil	Pranav Muniraj	En Vizhigalil	
2015	Kadhal Version 1.0	Rajaganapathy	Kadhal Version	
2014	Kangal Rendum	Kousikan Sivanlingam	Kousi's Beginning	

== See also ==
- Diwakar (disambiguation)
