= Sowmya =

Sowmya is a given name for women. It means "That which is born of Soma". Soma means Chandra, the lunar deity. Sowmya therefore means Budha, because Budha is said to be the son of Chandra. Sowmya also means shubhagrahas or beneficial. It can also mean soft and pure.

== People named Sowmya ==
- S. Sowmya - South Indian Classical singer
- Sowmya Raoh- Playback singer
- Sowmya Rachakonda - Carnatic music singer and Analytics professional
- Sowmya Reddy— Member of Karnataka Legislative Assembly representing Jayanagar, Bangalore
