= Pop Shalini =

Indian singer

Shalini Singh
- Born: 16 May 1982 (age 44); Chennai, Tamil Nadu, India
- Genres: Indian music, playback singing
- Occupation: Singer
- Instrument: Singing
- Years active: 1996–present
- Website: singershalini.blogspot.com

Shalini Singh, popularly called as Pop Shalini, is a singer from Tamil Nadu, India. Born in 1984, she is a singer, performer, blogger, and also a writer. She released an album 'Shalini' when she was only 13. She has sung over 5000 songs in various Indian languages for Indian films and albums. She has sung for the likes of A. R. Rahman, Harris Jayaraj, Illayaraja, Yuvan Shankar Raja, Vidyasagar and many others.

She is also the CEO of Tinsel Rangi Productions. She is married to Balaji and has a son Aadithya. She lives in Chennai. Her husband works as General Manager for a Sweden Based Company.

== Early life ==
Born in Tamil Nadu, she was the only child of her parents. She studied at Holy Angels Convent School and did music classes called Alpha to Omega. She started her career at the age of 3 years.

She also performed for Doordarshan when she was in the first standard at Holy Angels Convent School. It was a 10 minutes performance for the Little Stars segment during the 1980s. She was invited by Brian and Christine Paul be a part of their group in Chennai. She had also received a chance from Thayanban who gave her the offer of her first jingle at the age of 5 years.

She did a lot of stage performances and took part in many music competitions in her school life. One of the youngest Pop singers, she has sung more than 5000 songs. She joined Magnasound at the age of 12 years. She has also done concerts all over the world including places like Germany, France, Singapore, Malaysia, and Sri Lanka. She was the judge of a reality show recently.

== Career ==
Her first album released when she was 13 years old named 'Shalini’. It was a mixture of 8 songs in the Tamil language. Her great works include Kakka Kakka'sYennai Konjam and Mudhal Naal written by Harris Jayaraj. India Today’s survey choose her as the Face of the Millennium. She has also sung for many Hindi albums. She first practiced Western Classical for 11 years after which she learned Carnatic music for two years, and later she learned Hindustani music for six years. She completed her 8th grade Piano lessons exam in 2014.

She also did 4th-grade Theory of Music lessons from Trinity College of Music, London. Her first song was Deewana Deewana from the movie Thulli Thiranda Kaalam produced by K Balachander. She was only 14 years old then. Her first released song was Ailasa Ailasa for the movie Naam Iruvar NamakkuIruvar directed by Karthik Raja. She sang this song with Udit Narayan.

Other than him, she has also sung with other famous artists like A. R. Rahaman, Illayaraja, Yuvan Shankar Raja, Shaan, S. Janaki, Whigfield, Vidhyasagar, Shankar Mahadevan, Hari Haran, Lucky Ali, Srinivas, Sukhwinder, Unni Krishnan, and Sukhbir. She has sung jingles and for advertisements like Nutrine, Parry’s Biscuits, Coffee Bites, Milka, Reynolds, Fairever, HMT, Shreyas Watches, Kumaran Silks, Lalitha Jewelry, Idhayam Oils, Bar-one, Maggi, Saber Pens, Cello Pens under Rajiv Menon productions, and the latest one for Ponds Talcum Powder.

She has taken part in ' Annie', 'Sound Of Music', 'Cats', and other musicals and given her voice for more than 25 albums in many different languages including Hindi, Bhojpuri, Malayalam, Telugu, Gujarati, and Kannada. She released her songs Chikpete Sachagalu, Chamkaysi Chindi Udaysi, and Gilli in the year 2009 and some of her albums are Premachalam, Shalini, Tandava, Bose, Ra.One, Kurumbu, Jore, Vedha, Pop Cam, Isai, Dhool, Force, Adithadi, Rockstar, Kaadhal, Irandu Per, Oru Murai Sollividu, Vattaram, UnnaleUnnale, OruKadhalSeiveer, Rajadhi Raja, Ambuli, Arul, Manikanda, Gramophone, Dasavathaaram, and many more.

She was a singer at the Broadway Express Show held at Music Academy in Chennai by Jeffrey Vardon. She also went to the Asia Pacific World Choir Games. A Spectacular Indian Musical Theatre was held by her. When people believe in her work, it makes her happy. She has sung for the movies including Thulli Thiranda Kaalam, Velai, Appu, NaamIruvar NamakkuIruvar, Kalyaana Gal, I Love You Da, Run, Pallavan, Kaalaatpadai, Punnagai Poove, Kaadhal KisuKisu, Pepsi, Kaaka Kaaka, Indru Mudhal, ThirudaThirudi, Paarai, Anbe Un Vasam, Lollipop, Nizhal, Alai, Irandu Peyar, and others.

She has sung for the serial Choti Si Asha on Sony Television Channel, Theinmozhi, Premi and other Tamil songs. Other than her career in singing, she has also done MA in English Literature. She calls herself a bookworm. She has released her new Single Just A Girl Inside on BBC Radio and The Rain Song by Emerald Keyz Studio. She sang for Yuvan Shankar Raja and Mr. Bharadwaj. She got her break from the song Vai Raja Vai from the movie Panchathanthiram. She considers Asha Bhosle and Lata Mangeshkar to be her role models.

== Awards ==
She received her First Award called Youth Merit Award from a Rotary Club. She also received an award for the Best Singer for the movie Kalai Mandram in 1997.

Later she received the Special Playback Singer Award by the Lions Club of Chennai. She won the Award from Matchmakers as the Best Singer in 2002. She won an award for Best Female Singer Kannada by the Karnataka State Government. She won the award for Best New Face when she appeared in the serial Oonjal by K. Balachander. She did a movie Pop Carn which was directed by Nazzer
