= Lavanya Sundararaman =

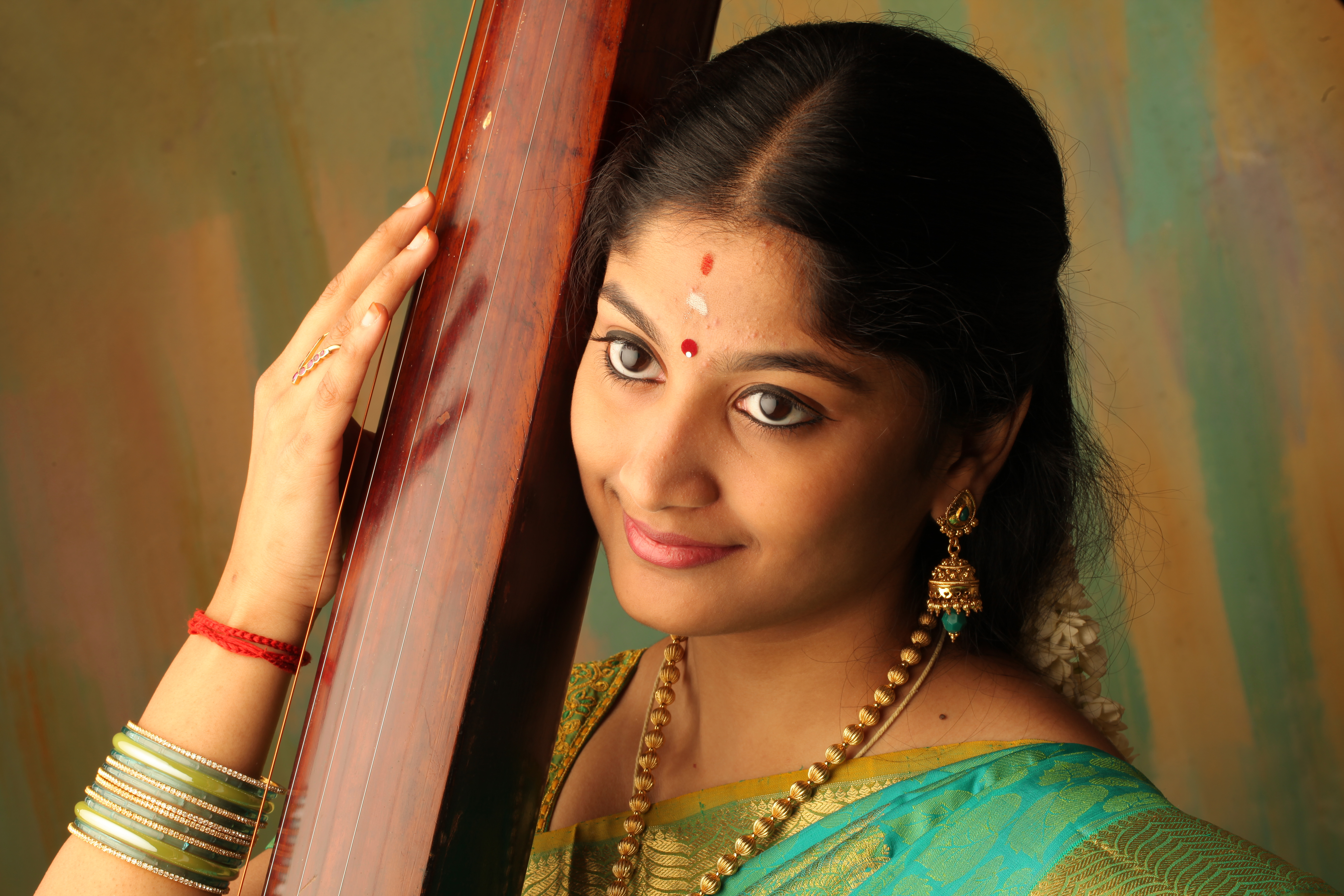

Background information
- Origin: Chennai, Tamil Nadu, India
- Genre: Carnatic music – Indian Classical Music
- Occupation: Singer
- Years active: 2000–present

Lavanya Sundararaman is a Carnatic musician. She received initial training from Poornapragya Rao, and went on to receive further training from her family of musicians.

== Early life and family ==
Lavanya was born to Gayathri and Dr. R. Sundararaman. She is the great-granddaughter of the prominent Carnatic music vocalist, D. K. Pattammal. She is also the great-granddaughter of Palghat Mani Iyer, who was a mridangam maestro.

Lavanya received music lessons during her childhood from her great-grandmother D. K. Pattammal. She is a disciple of her grandmother and noted singer Lalitha Sivakumar, her mother Gayathri Sundararaman, and is a niece and disciple of renowned singer Nithyasree Mahadevan.

Lavanya has completed her post-graduate and undergraduate studies in Music at Queen Mary's College, Chennai and is pursuing her Ph.D. in Music under the guidance of Dr. M. A. Bhageerathi.

== Musical career ==
=== Touring ===
Lavanya has performed at major sabhas in India, particularly during the annual December music festival in Chennai. She has also performed songs and concerts in the United States of America, Canada, Sri Lanka, and other destinations.

Notable performances by Lavanya have included:

- Concert with great-grandmother D. K. Pattammal, grandmother Lalitha Sivakumar, grandfather I. Sivakumar, and aunt Nithyasree Mahadevan at the Madras Music Academy in September 2000.
- Thematic concert for Mangalam Ganapathy Trust in February 2008.
- Concerts with aunt Nithyasree Mahadevan entitled Triveni Sangamam and Vellithirai Ragangal featuring Film songs in 2009.
- Concert with grandmother Lalitha Sivakumar and aunt Nithyasree Mahadevan in tribute to great-grandmother D. K. Pattammal in 2010 to conclude 25th anniversary celebration for Youth Association for Carnatic Music.
- Concerts in Mumbai in July 2011.

=== Television works ===
Lavanya has appeared in various television music programs to perform, including:

- The Ragamalika music show on Jaya TV in 2004 for a special Tamil New Year program.
- A special Diwali program telecast in 2009 on Raj TV.
- Season 2 of Airtel Super Singer Junior for their Karthigai Special program in November 2009 on Vijay TV.
- The Theanamudhu music program on Makkal TV telecast in India in 2013, 2014 and 2015.
- Navarathiri Nayagiyar special music program telecast on Jaya TV during the Navarathri Festival in the year 2015

=== Discography ===
Lavanya has sung songs in Hindu devotional and other-genre music albums, including:

- Sai Lavanya Lahari for Sri Sathya Sai Sadhana Trust, Prashanthinilayam, Puttaparthi.
- Karunai Deivame for Giri Trading Agency.
- Madurakali Amman for Mangalam Ganapathy Trust.
- Triveni Sangamam DVD for Giri Trading Agency.

=== Titles, awards, and recognition ===
Year	Honour	Honouring bestowed or presented by	Ref
1999	Award	Padma Sheshadri Bala Bhavan (PSBB)	
2000	6 year Classical Vocal Music Scholarship	PSBB group of schools	
2000	Oothukaadu Venkatasubaiyar Trust Prize	Oothukaadu Venkatasubaiyar Trust	
2006	Various Prizes	Mylapore Fine Arts	
2006 & 2007	Various Prizes	Narada Gana Sabha	
2007	Ariyakudi KV Narayanaswamy Memorial Trust competition prize	Ariyakudi KV Narayanaswamy Memorial Trust	
2007	First prize in Tamil songs for ladies and gentlemen	Madras Music Academy (presented December 2007)	
2007-2008	Platinum Jubilee Year Celebration Music Conference Prize	Indian Fine Arts Society	
2008	"Northern Star" plaque and title for preserving Tamil heritage	PC Riding Association Of Scarborough Centre, Canada (conferred on 7 June 2008 in Toronto)	
2008	"Tamil Isai Kuyil" title	Tamil Times Inc Toronto, Canada	
2009	Krishna Gana Sabha Endowment Prize	Krishna Gana Sabha (presented for performance during 54th Arts and Dance Festival in December 2009)	
2009	Tambura Prize	Neelakanda Sivan Trust	
2010	Tambura Prize on Rukmini Ramani's compositions	Sivan Fine Arts Academy and Sivanugraha	
2010	"Innisai Ilavarasi" title	Adi Arul Neri Manram, Canada (conferred in May 2010)	
2010	"Isai Ilavarasi" title	Tamil Times Inc Toronto, Canada (conferred in June 2010)	
2011	Bhagidhari award	Government of Delhi (presented by Neyveli Santhanagopalan on 12 December 2011 at Krishna Gana Sabha)	
2011	"Amuthagaanavani" title	Nallur Kandaswamy Temple Maha Sannidhanam, Sri Lanka (presented during Diamond Jubilee Celebrations of Hindu Education Society in December 2011)	
