= Jaya Super Singer South India =

- Directed by: MS Senthil Kumar
- Presented by: Vaishali
- Judges: Nithyasree Mahadevan; S. P. Sailaja; Bharadwaj
- Country of origin: India
- Original language: Tamil
- No. of seasons: 1
- No. of episodes: 99

Production
- Running time: 1 hour

Original release
- Network: Jaya TV
- Release: 20 September 2014 – 30 August 2015

Jaya Super Singer South India is a reality-based Indian Tamil-language singing competition that was broadcast on Jaya TV. The program seeks to discover playback singing talent in South India.

The show debuted on 20 September 2014, airing on weekend nights at 8:00pm on Jaya TV. The final episode was telecast on 30 August 2015.

== Season 1 ==
Season 1 of the show is directed by MS Senthil Kumar.

=== Auditions ===
==== Open auditions ====
The open auditions, the first stage in determining a seasons finalists, were conducted in the South Indian states of Tamil Nadu, Andhra Pradesh, Karnataka and Kerala. During this stage, contestants sing a song or two before a panel of preliminary state audition judges. This panel then decides on-the-spot whether the contestant demonstrated enough ability and performance value to proceed further. If the contestant exhibited exceptional ability in their performance, judges award a "ticket" moving them instantly one step forward in the competition. Alternatively, if judges are on the fence about the singer, they will place the contestant on a waitlist until the end of that day's auditions. Otherwise, if the contestant lacks the ability and performance value to proceed further, the contestant will be rejected.

No.	Title	Audition judges	Original release date
1	"Chennai, Tamil Nadu Auditions - part 1"	veena exponent Rajhesh Vaidhya, vocalist Binny Krishnakumar, and vocalist Vinaya Karthik Rajan	20 September 2014
Auditions which were held in Chennai before a panel of three judges. The episode was hosted by Deepika.
2	"Chennai, Tamil Nadu Auditions - part 2"	veena exponent Rajhesh Vaidhya, vocalist Binny Krishnakumar, and vocalist Vinaya Karthik Rajan	21 September 2014
More auditions which were held in Chennai before a panel of three judges. The episode was hosted by Deepika.
3	"Madurai, Tamil Nadu Auditions - part 1"	singer Anandhu, vocalist Binny Krishnakumar, and vocalist Sangeetha	27 September 2014
Auditions which were held in Madurai before a panel of three judges. The episode was hosted by Swathishta.
4	"Madurai, Tamil Nadu Auditions - part 2"	singer Anandhu, vocalist Binny Krishnakumar, and vocalist Sangeetha	28 September 2014
More auditions which were held in Madurai before a panel of three judges. The episode was hosted by Swathishta.
5	"Coimbatore, Tamil Nadu Auditions - part 1"	vocalist Srilekha Parthasarathy and vocalist Vinaya Karthik Rajan	4 October 2014
Auditions which were held in Coimbatore before a panel of two judges. The episode was hosted by Swathishta.
6	"Coimbatore, Tamil Nadu Auditions - part 2"	vocalist Srilekha Parthasarathy and vocalist Vinaya Karthik Rajan	5 October 2014
More auditions which were held in Coimbatore before a panel of two judges. The episode was hosted by Swathishta.
7	"Bangalore, Karnataka Auditions - part 1"	vocalist Vinaya Karthik Rajan and vocalist Sangeetha	11 October 2014
Auditions which were held in Bangalore before a panel of two judges. The episode was hosted by Swathishta.
8	"Bangalore, Karnataka Auditions - part 2"	vocalist Vinaya Karthik Rajan and vocalist Sangeetha	12 October 2014
More auditions which were held in Bangalore before a panel of two judges. The episode was hosted by Swathishta.
9	"Hyderabad, Andhra Pradesh Auditions - part 1"	vocalist Sangeetha Sachith, trumpet exponent Jeevan Thomas Xavier, and vocalist Charulatha Mani	18 October 2014
Auditions which were held in Hyderabad before a panel of three judges. The episode was hosted by Swathishta.
10	"Hyderabad, Andhra Pradesh Auditions - part 2"	vocalist Sangeetha Sachith, trumpet exponent Jeevan Thomas Xavier, and vocalist Charulatha Mani	19 October 2014
More auditions which were held in Hyderabad before a panel of three judges. The episode was hosted by Swathishta.
11	"Cochin, Kerala Auditions - part 1"	vocalist Charulatha Mani, vocalist K. Krishnakumar, and vocalist Binny Krishnakumar	25 October 2014
Auditions which were held in Kerala before a panel of three judges. The episode was hosted by Swathishta.
12	"Cochin, Kerala Auditions - part 2"	vocalist Charulatha Mani, vocalist K. Krishnakumar, and vocalist Binny Krishnakumar	26 October 2014
More auditions which were held in Kerala before a panel of three judges. The episode was hosted by Swathishta.

==== Selection of top 20 - final level auditions ====
===== Spot Selection Round (1 November 2014 – 23 November 2014) =====
In the second and final stage of the audition process, contestants shortlisted from the open auditions arrive in a central location in Chennai. They are expected to perform a song or two before a different panel of judges with a view of being selected as top 20 finalists of the show.

For this stage of the process, the program host asserts that it is distinct from other reality shows as it does not embarrass unsuccessful contestants in the show by actively 'rejecting' them on the spot; rather, it actively encourages contestants in this stage to continue to improve their singing skills.

Again, this panel then decides on-the-spot whether the contestant demonstrated enough ability and performance value to proceed further. If the contestant exhibited exceptional ability in their performance, judges award a "green card" shortlisting them instantly one step forward in the competition towards finalist selection. Otherwise, if judges are on the fence about the singer, they will ask the contestant to wait for a decision at the end of the final level auditions.

====== Episode 13 (1 November 2014) ======
- Judges: music director Bharadwaj, veteran playback singer S. P. Sailaja, and Carnatic music exponent Nithyasree Mahadevan
- Host: Shriranjani
- Performances:

– Special performance by non-contestant performer
– Contestant spot-selected to advance to next round
– Contestant waitlisted then selected on subsequent episode

Order	Non-contestant performer	Contestant(s)	Song	Original artist	Lyricist	Music director/composer	Movie (year)
1	Bharadwaj		"Gnyaabagam Varudhe"	Bharadwaj	Pa. Vijay	Bharadwaj	Autograph (2004)
2	S.P. Sailaja		"Chinnan Chiru Vayathil"	S.P. Sailaja	Kannadasan	Ilaiyaraaja	Meendum Kokila (1981)
3	Nithyasree Mahadevan		"Tharunam Idhaiyya" in raga Sivaranjani	Nithyasree Mahadevan	Papanasam Sivan	Papanasam Sivan	
4		Sindhuja	"Meghame Meghame"	Vani Jayaram	Vairamuthu	Shankar–Ganesh	Palaivana Solai (1981)
5		Sindhuja	"Idhu Oru Nila"	S. Janaki	Kannadasan/Vairamuthu	Ilaiayaraaja	Tik Tik Tik (1981)
6		Bhuvaneshwari	"Kaatril Varum"	Hariharan, Sadhana Sargam, Shreya Ghoshal	Vaali	Ilaiyaraaja	Oru Naal Oru Kanavu (2005)
7		Shrinidhi	"Sowkiyamaa Kannae"	Nithyasree Mahadevan	Vairamuthu	A. R. Rahman	Sangamam (1999)
8		Shrinidhi	"Oru Dheivam Thantha Poove"	Chinmayi & P. Jayachandran	Vairamuthu	A. R. Rahman	Kannathil Muthamittal (2002)
9		Shrinidhi	"Allegra Allegra"	Rita	Viveka	Devi Sri Prasad	Kanthaswamy (2009)
10		Siju Kumar	"Khwaja Endhan"	A. R. Rahman	Kashif	A. R. Rahman	Jodhaa Akbar (2008) (Dubbed version)
11		Siju Kumar	"Narumugaye"	P. Unnikrishnan & Bombay Jayashri	Vairamuthu	A. R. Rahman	Iruvar (1997)

====== Episode 14 (2 November 2014) ======
- Judges: music director Bharadwaj, veteran playback singer S.P. Sailaja, and Carnatic music exponent Nithyasree Mahadevan
- Host: Shriranjani
- Performances:

– Contestant spot-selected to advance to next round
– Contestant waitlisted then selected on subsequent episode

Order	Contestant(s)	Song	Original artist	Lyricist	Music director	Movie (year)
1	Raagaa	"Anandha Ragam"	Deepan Chakravarthy & Uma Ramanan	Gangai Amaran	Ilaiyaraaja	Panneer Pushpangal (1981)
2	Raagaa	"Mudhal Murai"	Yuvan Shankar Raja	Na. Muthukumar	Ilaiyaraaja	Neethane En Ponvasantham (2012)
3	Madhumathi	"Andha Sivagami"	P. Susheela	Kannadasan	R. Govardhanam	Pattanathil Bhootham (1967)
4	Madhumathi	"Kannan Vandhu"	S. Janaki	Vaali	Ilaiyaraaja	Rettai Vaal Kuruvi (1987)
5	Lekshmi Jayan	"Azhagu Nilave"	K. S. Chithra	Vairamuthu	A. R. Rahman	Pavithra (1994)
6	Lekshmi Jayan	"Konjam Nilavu"	Annupamaa	Vairamuthu	A. R. Rahman	Thiruda Thiruda (1993)
7	H. Aravindh	"Vidu Kathaiya"	Hariharan	Vairamuthu	A. R. Rahman	Muthu (1995)
8	H. Aravindh	"Urvasi Urvasi"	A. R. Rahman, Suresh Peters & Shahul Hameed	Vairamuthu	A. R. Rahman	Kaadhalan (1994)
9	Padmapriya	"Roja Poo"	S. Janaki	Vaali	Ilaiyaraaja	Agni Natchathiram (1988)
10	Srikanth	"Ennavale"	P. Unnikrishnan	Vairamuthu	A. R. Rahman	Kaadhalan (1994)
11	Vinodh	"Vandhaal Mahalakshmiye"	S. P. Balasubrahmanyam	Vaali	Ilaiyaraaja	Uyarndha Ullam (1994)
12	Ranjith	"Eeramaana Rojave"	K. J. Yesudas	Vairamuthu	Ilaiyaraaja	Ilamai Kaalangal (1983)
13	Ranjith	"Uyirin Uyire"	KK & Suchitra	Thamarai	Harris Jayaraj	Kaakha Kaakha (2003)

====== Episode 15 (8 November 2014) ======
- Judges: music director Bharadwaj, veteran playback singer S.P. Sailaja, and Carnatic music exponent Nithyasree Mahadevan
- Host: Shriranjani
- Performances:

No contestants were spot-selected to advance to the next round in this episode.

– Contestant waitlisted then selected on subsequent episode

Order	Contestant(s)	Song	Original artist	Lyricist	Music director	Movie (year)
1	Aashish	"Malargale"	K. S. Chithra & Hariharan	Vairamuthu	A. R. Rahman	Love Birds (1996)
2	Aashish	"Rojaave"	S. P. Balasubrahmanyam & S. Janaki	Vairamuthu	Ilaiyaraaja	Ninaivellam Nithya (1982)
3	Shivapriya	"Raa Raa"	Binny Krishnakumar & Tippu	Bhuvanachandra	Vidyasagar	Chandramukhi (2005)
4	Shaanthini	"Vaidhehi Raman"	S. Janaki	Gangai Amaran	Ilaiyaraaja	Pagal Nilavu (1985)
5	Sai Ramya	"Chittukuravi"	P. Susheela	Kannadasan	M. S. Viswanathan	Savaale Samali (1971)
6	Sai Ramya	"Gangai Karai"	P. Susheela	Kannadasan	K. V. Mahadevan	Vaanampadi (1993)
7	Sumesh Krishna	"Raja Raja Cholan"	K. J. Yesudas	Mu. Metha	Ilaiyaraaja	Rettai Vaal Kuruvi (1987)
8	Sumesh Krishna	"Yeh Aatha"	Tippu & Anuradha Sriram	Gangai Amaran	Mani Sharma	Malaikottai (2007)
9	Kaaveri	"Paadu Nilaave"	S. P. Balasubrahmanyam & S. Janaki	Mu. Metha	Ilaiyaraaja	Udaya Geetham (1988)
10	Sarigas Ganga	"Nee Inge"	Swarnalatha	Gangai Amaran	Ilaiyaraaja	Chinna Thambi (1991)
11	Sathish	"Mandram Vandhu"	S. P. Balasubrahmanyam	Vaali	Ilaiyaraaja	Mouna Ragam (1986)
12	Sathish	"Dhevan Thandha"	P. Jayachandran & S. Janaki	Kannadasan	Ilaiyaraaja	Unnai Naan Santhithen (1983)
13	Vindhyashri	"Kannaalane"	K. S. Chithra & A. R. Rahman	Vairamuthu	A. R. Rahman	Bombay (1995)
14	Poornima	"Chinna Thaai Aval"	S. Janaki	Vaali	Ilaiyaraaja	Thalapathi (1991)

====== Episode 16 (9 November 2014) ======
- Judges: music director Bharadwaj, veteran playback singer S.P. Sailaja, and Carnatic music exponent Nithyasree Mahadevan
- Host: Shriranjani
- Performances:

– Contestant spot-selected to advance to next round
– Contestant waitlisted then selected on subsequent episode

Order	Contestant(s)	Song	Original artist	Lyricist	Music director	Movie (year)
1	Priyadarshini	"Om Namashivaya"	S. Janaki	Vairamuthu	Ilaiyaraaja	Salangai Oli (1983)
2	Hari	"Poomaalai Vaangi"	K. J. Yesudas	Vaali	Ilaiyaraaja	Sindhu Bhairavi (1985)
3	Shanmukha Bhagyashri	"Aadiyil Sedhi"	K. S. Chithra		Deva	En Aasai Machan (1994)
4	Shanmukha Bhagyashri	"Ayya Sami"	M. L. Vasanthakumari		R. Sudharsanam	Or Iravu (1951)
5	Somadas	"Sandhana Thendralai"	Hariharan & Mahalakshmi Iyer	Vairamuthu	A. R. Rahman	Kandukondain Kandukondain (2000)
6	Somadas	"Vathikuchi"	S. P. Balasubrahmanyam	Vaali	Yuvan Shankar Raja	Dheena (2000)
7	Kaushik	"Chithiram Pesuthadi"	T. M. Soundararajan	Ku. Ma. Balasubramaniam	T. G. Lingappa	Sabaash Meena (1958)
8	Kaushik	"Kaadhal Konjam"	Naresh Iyer	Thamarai	Harris Jayaraj	Pachaikili Muthucharam (2007)
9	Deepika	"Paadu Nilaave"	Dhanush & Shruti Haasan	Dhanush	Anirudh Ravichander	3 (2012)
10	Deepika	"Kannodu Kanbathellam"	Nithyasree Mahadevan	Vairamuthu	A. R. Rahman	Jeans (1998)
11	Dhinesh	"Neelavaana Odaiyil"	S. P. Balasubrahmanyam	Vaali	Gangai Amaran	Vazhvey Maayam (1982)
12	Dhinesh	"Dhevan Thandha"	S. P. Balasubrahmanyam	Gangai Amaran	Ilaiyaraaja	Rajadhi Raja (1989)
13	Baalaaji	"Oh Paapa"	S. P. Balasubrahmanyam & S. Janaki	Vaali	Ilaiyaraaja	Idhayathai Thirudathe (1989)
14	Baalaaji	"Megham Kottatum"	S. P. Balasubrahmanyam	Vaali	Ilaiyaraaja	Enakkul Oruvan (1984)
15	Vasundhara	"Thoongaadha Vizhigal"	K. J. Yesudas & S. Janaki	Vaali	Ilaiyaraaja	Agni Natchathiram (1988)
16	Indhumathi	"Ther Kondu Sendravan"	P. Susheela	Vaali	Ilaiyaraaja	Enakkul Oruvan (1984)

====== Episode 17 (15 November 2014) ======
- Judges: music director Bharadwaj, veteran playback singer S.P. Sailaja, and Carnatic music exponent Nithyasree Mahadevan
- Host: Shriranjani
- Performances:

No contestants were spot-selected to advance to the next round in this episode.

– Contestant waitlisted then selected on subsequent episode

Order	Contestant(s)	Song	Original artist	Lyricist	Music director	Movie (year)
1	Vaanathishri	"Maalai Pozhuthin"	P. Susheela	Kannadasan	Viswanathan–Ramamoorthy	Bhagyalakshmi (1961)
2	Sharath Kumar	"Aariro"	Haricharan	Na. Muthukumar	G. V. Prakash Kumar	Deiva Thirumagal (2011)
3	Sharath Kumar	"Kannitheevu Ponnaa"	M. L. R. Karthikeyan	Kapilan	K	Yuddham Sei (2011)
4	Ajay	"Nandha En Nilaa"	S. P. Balasubrahmanyam	Pazhanisami	V. Dakshinamoorthy	Nanda En Nila (1977)
5	Gayathri	"Chithirai Sevvanam"	P. Jayachandran	Panchu Arunachalam	Ilaiyaraaja	Kaatrinile Varum Geetham (1978)
6	Keerthi	"Oh Butterfly"	S. P. Balasubrahmanyam & Asha Bhosle	Vaali	Ilaiyaraaja	Meera (1992)
7	Venkatesh	"Aadi Ponna"	Gaana Bala	Kapilan	Santhosh Narayanan	Attakathi (2012)
8	Venkatesh	"Poongkaatrile"	Unni Menon & Swarnalatha	Vairamuthu	A. R. Rahman	Uyire (1998)
9	Rithu	"Malligai"	Vani Jayaram	Vaali	M. S. Viswanathan	Dheerga Sumangali (1974)
10	Shankar Raman	"Mun Paniyaa"	S. P. Balasubrahmanyam & Malgudi Subha	Palani Bharathi	Yuvan Shankar Raja	Nandhaa (2001)
11	Sathyaprakash	"Oru Maalai"	Karthik	Thamarai	Harris Jayaraj	Ghajini (2005)
12	Arun Prasad	"Neelavaana Odaiyil"	S. P. Balasubrahmanyam	Vaali	Gangai Amaran	Vazhvey Maayam (1982)
13	Sriragam Muralidharan	"Nee Paadhi"	K. J. Yesudas & Uma Ramanan	Vaali/Mu. Metha	Ilaiyaraaja	Keladi Kanmani (1989)
14	Sowmya	"Maargazhi Thingal Allava"	S. Janaki, P. Unnikrishnan & Madhumitha	Vairamuthu	A. R. Rahman	Sangamam (1999)

====== Episode 18 (16 November 2014) ======
- Judges: music director Bharadwaj, veteran playback singer S.P. Sailaja, and Carnatic music exponent Nithyasree Mahadevan
- Host: Shriranjani
- Performances:

No contestants were spot-selected to advance to the next round in this episode.

– Special performance by guest judge/performer
– Contestant waitlisted then selected on subsequent episode

Order	Non-contestant performer	Contestant(s)	Song	Original artist	Lyricist	Music director	Movie (year)
1		Keshav	"Azhagae Azhagu"	K. J. Yesudas	Kannadasan	Ilaiyaraaja	Raja Paarvai (1979)
2		Sushmitha	"O Vasantha Raajaa"	S. P. Balasubrahmanyam & S. Janaki	Pulamaipithan	Ilaiyaraaja	Neengal Kettavai (1984)
3		Shibi	"Vizhiyile"	S. P. Balasubrahmanyam	Panchu Arunachalam	Ilaiyaraaja	Bhuvana Oru Kelvi Kuri (1977)
4		Sudharsan	"Minnale"	S. P. Balasubrahmanyam	Vairamuthu	A. R. Rahman	May Madham (2006)
5		Sudharsan	"Kadhalukku"	Pushpavannam Kuppuswamy & Sri Vardhini	Kapilan	Yuvan Shankar Raja	Perazhagan (2004)
6		Anusha Ravi	"Enna Enna Vaarthaigalo"	P. Susheela	Kannadasan	Viswanathan–Ramamoorthy	Vennira Aadai (1965)
7		Gnanashekhar	"Senorita"	S. P. Balasubrahmanyam	Gangai Amaran	Ilaiyaraaja	Johnny (1980)
8		Prasanna	"Thendrale Thendrale"	Mano, P. Unnikrishnan & Dominique Cerejo	Vaali	A. R. Rahman	Kadhal Desam (1996)
9		Prasanna	"Malligai"	Krishnaraj, Velmurugan & Sathyan	Snehan	Yuvan Shankar Raja	Kazhugu (2012)
10		Jasmine Fatima	"Naan Unnai Vaazhthi"	P. Susheela	Vaali	V. Kumar	Nootrukku Nooru (1978)
11		Sathish Kumar	"Vellai Pura"	K. J. Yesudas & S. Janaki	Vairamuthu	Ilaiyaraaja	Puthukavithai (1982)
12	S.P. Sailaja		"Vaan Pole Vannam"	S. P. Balasubrahmanyam & S.P. Sailaja	Vairamuthu	Ilaiyaraaja	Salangai Oli (1983)
13		Soundharya	"Unnai Kaanaadha Kannum"	P. Susheela	Kannadasan	K. V. Mahadevan	Idhayak Kamalam (1965)
14		Harini	"Unnavida"	Kamal Haasan & Shreya Ghoshal	Kamal Haasan	Ilaiyaraaja	Virumaandi (2004)
15		Nisar Rutin	"Varaha Nadhikarai"	Shankar Mahadevan	Vairamuthu	A. R. Rahman	Sangamam (1999)

====== Episode 19 (22 November 2014) ======
- Judges: music director Bharadwaj, veteran playback singer S.P. Sailaja, and Carnatic music exponent Nithyasree Mahadevan
- Host: Shriranjani
- Performances:

No contestants were spot-selected to advance to the next round in this episode.

– Contestant waitlisted then selected on subsequent episode

Order	Contestant(s)	Song	Original artist	Lyricist	Music director	Movie (year)
1	Dhanush	"Sandhosha Kanneere"	A. R. Rahman, Sowmya Raoh, Dominique Cerejo & Kavita Paudwal	Vairamuthu	A. R. Rahman	Uyire (1998)
2	Jayaprabha	"Ennulle"	Swarnalatha	Vaali	Ilaiyaraaja	Valli (1993)
3	Ganesh Kumar	"Poove Sempoove"	K. J. Yesudas	Vaali	Ilaiyaraaja	Solla Thudikuthu Manasu (1988)
4	Vishnuram	"Manuthu Mandhaiyile"	S. P. Balasubrahmanyam & Sasirekha	Vairamuthu	A. R. Rahman	Kizhakku Cheemayile (1993)
5	Krithika	"Ennulil Engo"	Vani Jayaram	Pulamaipithan	Ilaiyaraaja	Rosapoo Ravikaikari (1979)
6	Shridhar	"Raagangal Paathinaaru"	S. P. Balasubrahmanyam	Kannadasan	M. S. Viswanathan	Thillu Mullu (1981)
7	Jo	"Madai Thiranthu"	S. P. Balasubrahmanyam	Vaali Originally Written by Manivannan	Ilaiyaraaja	Nizhalgal (1980)
8	Sharavanan	"Aaru Maname"	T. M. Soundararajan	Kannadasan	M. S. Viswanathan	Andavan Kattalai (1964)
9	Gochan Soloman	"Anbae Anbae"	Harish Raghavendra	Na. Muthukumar	Harris Jayaraj	Dhaam Dhoom (2009)
10	Aparna	"Roja Poo"	S. Janaki	Vaali	Ilaiyaraaja	Agni Natchathiram (1988)
11	Charanya	"Thesulavudhe"	Ghantasala & P. Susheela	Thanjai N. Ramaiah Dass	Adi Narayana Rao	Manalane Mangayin Bhagyam (1957)
12	Larson Cyril	"Nilavu Thoongum"	S. P. Balasubrahmanyam & S. Janaki	Gangai Amaran	Ilaiyaraaja	Kunguma Chimil (1985)
13	Mu Nasseer	"Indha Ponnungale"	Jayamoorthy	Yugabharathy	D. Imman	Varuthapadatha Valibar Sangam

====== Episode 20 (23 November 2014) ======
- Judges: music director Bharadwaj, veteran playback singer S.P. Sailaja, and Carnatic music exponent Nithyasree Mahadevan
- Host: Shriranjani
- Performances:

At the conclusion of the auditions in this episode, the judges announced 10 of the top 20 finalists they selected to enter the competition this season. This included a recap of spot selected contestants from previous episodes in this round of auditions.

– Contestant spot-selected to advance to next round
– Contestant waitlisted then selected on subsequent episode

Order	Contestant(s)	Song	Original artist	Lyricist	Music director	Movie (year)
1	Balasubramaniam	"Nirpathuve Nadapathuve"	Harish Raghavendra	Subramania Bharathi	Ilaiyaraaja	Bharathi (2000)
2	Dharshanaa	"Nee Korinaal"	Karthik & Shweta Mohan	Madhan Karky	Sharreth	180 (2011)
3	Aravindh	"Varaha Nadhikarai"	Shankar Mahadevan	Vairamuthu	A. R. Rahman	Sangamam (1999)
4	Vishnu	"Maankuyile"	S. P. Balasubrahmanyam & S. Janaki	Gangai Amaran	Ilaiyaraaja	Karagattakaran (1989)
5	Prathipaa	"Kaatrodu Kuzhalin"	K. S. Chithra	Pulamaipithan	Ilaiyaraaja	Kodai Mazhai (1986)
6	Nellaiappan	"Mouname Paarvaiyaal"	P. B. Srinivas	Kannadasan	M. S. Viswanathan	Kodi Malar (1966)
7	Nellaiappan	"Thanni Thotti"	K. J. Yesudas	Vaali	Ilaiyaraaja	Sindhu Bhairavi (1985)
8	Jay Krishna	"Nee Pournami"	K. J. Yesudas	Ponnadiyan	Ilaiyaraaja	Oruvar Vaazhum Alaiyum (1988)
9	Aathreya	"Vennilavae"	Hariharan, Sadhana Sargam, Shankar Mahadevan & Kavita Paudwal	Vairamuthu	A. R. Rahman	Minsara Kanavu (1997)
10	Keerthana	"Yaarathu Sollamal"	Vani Jayaram	Kannadasan	Shankar–Ganesh	Nenjamellam Neeye (1983)
11	Shrikanth	"Thendral Vandhu"	K. J. Yesudas & S. Janaki	Vairamuthu	Ilaiyaraaja	Thendrale Ennai Thodu (1985)
12	Shrikanth	"Machan Peru"	Shankar Mahadevan	Kapilan	Vidyasagar	Madhurey (2004)

====== = Spot-selected contestants = ======
	Spot Selected Contestants	Gender	Audition City in South India
01	Shrinidhi	Female	Hyderabad, Andhra Pradesh
02	Lekshmi Jayan	Female	Cochin, Kerala
03	Somadas	Male	Cochin, Kerala
04	Prathipaa	Female	Cochin, Kerala
05	Keshav Vinodh	Male	Chennai, Tamil Nadu
06	Tanuj	Male	Chennai, Tamil Nadu
07	Sindhuja	Female	Hyderabad, Andhra Pradesh
08	Aathreya	Male	Chennai, Tamil Nadu
09	Nellaiappan	Male	Chennai, Tamil Nadu
10	Nisa Rutin	Male	Cochin, Kerala

===== Solo Introduction Round (29 November 2014 – 14 December 2014) =====
- Judges: music director Bharadwaj, veteran playback singer S.P. Sailaja, and Carnatic music exponent Nithyasree Mahadevan
- Host: Vaishali
- Performances:

The 10 finalists announced at the conclusion of episode 20, as well as 16 other contestants, were expected to perform over two performances rounds. The first round of performances were announced as the 'introduction' round. The second round of performances were announced as the 'duet' round. At the conclusion of the performances from both rounds, the judges were expected make a decision as to which other 10 contestants should be selected as top 20 finalists.

This round required solo performances from the contestants.

Episode (Air Date)	Order	Contestant(s)	Song	Original artist	Lyricist	Music director	Movie (year)
21 (29 November 2014)	1	Shrinidhi	"Kavidhai Kelungal"	Vani Jairam & P. Jayachandran	Vairamuthu	Ilaiyaraaja	Punnagai Mannan (2000)
21 (29 November 2014)	2	Aravind	"Thom Karuvil"	Shankar Mahadevan	Vairamuthu	A. R. Rahman	Star (2001)
21 (29 November 2014)	3	Sariga S. Ganga	"Yengae Enathu Kavithai"	K. S. Chitra & Srinivas	Vairamuthu	A. R. Rahman	Kandukondain Kandukondain (2000)
21 (29 November 2014)	4	Ajay Krishna	"Puttham Puddhu Pattu"	S. P. Balasubrahmanyam & Pushpavanam Kuppusamy	Vairamuthu	Vidyasagar	Thendral (2004)
22 (30 November 2014)	1	Keerthana	"Ival Oru Ilam Kuruvi"	S. Janaki	Vaali	Ilaiyaraaja	Brahma (1991)
22 (30 November 2014)	2	Somadas	"Vetri Kodi"	Palakkad Sreeram	Vairamuthu	A. R. Rahman	Padayappa (1999)
22 (30 November 2014)	3	Sai Ramya	"Oru Naal"	P. Susheela	Vaali	V. Kumar	Major Chandrakanth (1966)
22 (30 November 2014)	4	Ajay	"Unnidam Mayangugiren"	K. J. Yesudas	Vaali	V. Kumar & G. K. Venkatesh	Then Sindhudhe Vaanam (1975)
23 (6 December 2014)	1	Larson Cyril	"Verasa Pogayile"	D. Imman	Prema	D. Imman	Jilla (2013)
23 (6 December 2014)	2	Vasundhara	"Kannan Varuvan"	P. Susheela	Vaali	Viswanathan–Ramamoorthy	Panchavarna Kili (1965)
23 (6 December 2014)	3	Nellaiappan	"Kaatrin Mozhi"	Balram	Vairamuthu	Vidyasagar	Mozhi (2013)
23 (6 December 2014)	4	Shanmukha Bhagyashri	"Oru Kili Uruguthu"	S. P. Sailaja & S. Janaki	Gangai Amaran	Ilaiyaraaja	Aanandha Kummi (1983)
23 (6 December 2014)	5	Shrikanth Suresh	"Iruvathu Kodi"	Hariharan	Vairamuthu	S. A. Rajkumar	Thullatha Manamum Thullum (1999)
23 (6 December 2014)	6	Anusha Ravi	"Ninaithu Ninaithu"	Shreya Ghoshal	Na. Muthukumar	Selvaraghavan & Yuvan Shankar Raja	7G Rainbow Colony (2004)
24 (7 December 2014)	1	Keshav Vinodh	"Enakkoru Kaadhal"	S. P. Balasubrahmanyam & M. S. Viswanathan	Vaali	M. S. Viswanathan	Muthana Muthallavo (1976)
24 (7 December 2014)	2	Prathipaa	"Poovarusam Poo"	S. Janaki	Gangai Amaran	Ilaiyaraaja	Kizhake Pogum Rail (2013)
24 (7 December 2014)	3	Tanuj	"Poi Solla Koodaadhu"	Hariharan & Sadhana Sargam		Vidyasagar	Run (2002)
24 (7 December 2014)	4	Lekshmi Jayan	"Machana Pathingala"	S. Janaki	Vaali	Ilaiyaraaja	Annakili (1976)
25 (13 December 2014)	1	Aparna	"Brindavanathukku"	P. Susheela	Kannadasan	M. S. Viswanathan	Lakshmi Kalyanam (1968)
25 (13 December 2014)	2	Sathish	"Kalyaana Maalai"	S. P. Balasubrahmanyam	Vaali	Ilaiyaraaja	Pudhu Pudhu Arthangal (1989)
25 (13 December 2014)	3	Harini	"Marudaani"	Madhushree, A. R. Rahman, Hentry Kuruvilla	Vaali	A. R. Rahman	Sakkarakatti (2008)
25 (13 December 2014)	4	Nisar Rutin	"Poove Sempoove"	K. J. Yesudas	Vaali	Ilaiyaraaja	Solla Thudikuthu Manasu (1988)
26 (14 December 2014)	1	Hari	"Dheivam Thandha Veedu"	K. J. Yesudas	Kannadasan	M. S. Viswanathan	Aval Oru Thodar Kathai (1974)
26 (14 December 2014)	2	Shaanthini	"Kaadhalin Dheepam Ondru"	S. Janaki	Panchu Arunachalam	Ilaiyaraaja	Thambikku Entha Ooru (1984)
26 (14 December 2014)	3	Aathreyaa	"Thanga Thaamarai"	S. P. Balasubrahmanyam	Vairamuthu	A. R. Rahman	Minsara Kanavu (1997)
26 (14 December 2014)	4	Vaanathishri	"Thalattum Pongkaatru"	S. Janaki	Vaali	Ilaiyaraaja	Gopura Vasalile (1991)

===== Duet Introduction Round (20 December 2014 – 28 December 2014) =====
- Judges: music director Bharadwaj, veteran playback singer S.P. Sailaja, and Carnatic music exponent Nithyasree Mahadevan
- Host: Vaishali
- Performances:

This round required duet performances from the contestants. At the conclusion of this round, the judges announced their decision as to the remaining contestants selected as top 20 finalists. The judges confirmed that although it was not possible for all contestants to participate in all rounds for various reasons (such as illness, exam studies, difficulties traveling interstate at an agreed time, and so forth), a decision was made taking into account the overall potential of each contestant from their performances to-date. After the judges announced the names of the other selected contestants, the host pointed out that 12 contestants were named instead of 10. The judges asserted the last two named contestants were lucky surprise selections but warned that those contestants should not become complacent as they were allowed into the competition by half marks.

Episode (Air Date)	Order	Contestant 1	Contestant 2	Song	Original artist	Lyricist	Music director	Movie (year)
27 (20 December 2014)	1	Shrikanth Suresh	Shaanthini	"Un Per Solla"	Hariharan & Sujatha Mohan	Vaali, Kalaikumar & Na. Muthukumar	Deva	Minsara Kanna (1999)
27 (20 December 2014)	2	Ajay	Keerthanaa	"Malare Mounamaa"	S. P. Balasubrahmanyam & S. Janaki	Vairamuthu	Vidyasagar	Karnaa (1995)
27 (20 December 2014)	3	Vasundhara	Sathish Kumar	"Ore Naal Unnai Naan"	S. P. Balasubrahmanyam & Vani Jayaram	Vaali	Ilaiyaraaja	Ilamai Oonjal Aadukirathu (1976)
28 (21 December 2014)	1	Ajay Krishna	Prathipaa	"Thedum Kan"	S. P. Balasubrahmanyam & S. Janaki	Vaali	M. S. Viswanathan & Ilaiyaraaja	Mella Thirandhathu Kadhavu (1986)
28 (21 December 2014)	2	Nissar Rutin	Lekshmi Jayan	"Unn Perai Sollum"	Naresh Iyer, Shreya Ghoshal & Haricharan	Na. Muthukumar	G. V. Prakash Kumar	Angadi Theru (1995)
28 (21 December 2014)	3	Aravindh	Anusha Ravi	"Swaasame Swaasame"	S. P. Balasubrahmanyam & Sadhana Sargam	Pa. Vijay	A. R. Rahman	Thenali (2000)
28 (21 December 2014)	4	Tanuj	Aparna	"Oru Paadhi Kadhavu"	Haricharan & Vandana Srinivasan	Na. Muthukumar	G. V. Prakash Kumar	Thaandavam (2012)
29 (27 December 2014)	1	Shanmukha Bhagyashri	Larson Cyril	"Kandaangi Kandaangi"	Shreya Ghoshal & Vijay	Vairamuthu	D. Imman	Jilla (2014)
29 (27 December 2014)	2	Keshav Vinodh	Sariga S. Ganga	"Raathiriyil Poothirukkum"	S. P. Balasubrahmanyam & S. Janaki	Pulamaipithan	Ilaiyaraaja	Thanga Magan (1983)
29 (27 December 2014)	3	Nellaiappan	Harini	"Ding Dong"	Madhu Balakrishnan & Madhushree	Pa. Vijay	Vidyasagar	Ji (2005)
29 (27 December 2014)	4	Sai Ramya	Hari	"Konja Neram"	Asha Bhosle & Madhu Balakrishnan	Yugabharathi	Vidyasagar	Chandramukhi (2005)
30 (28 December 2014)	1	Somdas	Vanathishri	"Sundhari Kannaal"	S. P. Balasubrahmanyam & S. Janaki	Vaali	Ilaiyaraaja	Thalapathi (1991)
30 (28 December 2014)	2	Shrinidhi	Aathreya	"Un Samayal Arayil"	P. Unnikrishnan & Sujatha Mohan	Kabilan	Vidyasagar	Dhill (2001)

====== Selected wait-listed contestants ======
Order in which remaining finalists were announced	Spot Selected Contestants	Audition City in South India
01	Vaanathishri	
02	Sai Ramya	
03	Saariga S. Ganga	
04	Larson Cyril	
05	Vasundhara	
06	Ajay Krishna	
07	Madhumathi	
08	Aravindh	
09	Shaanthini	
10	Sathish Kumar	
11	Ajay	
12	Anusha Ravi	

=== Top 22 contestants ===
Shrinidhi is from Hyderabad, Andhra Pradesh. She received training in Carnatic music from prominent vocalist, Nedunuri Krishnamoorthy.

Lekshmi Jayan is from Kerala.

Somadas is from Kerala.

Prathipaa is from Kerala.

Keshav Vinodh initially auditioned at Chennai, Tamil Nadu.

Tanuj Nair initially auditioned at Chennai, Tamil Nadu.

Sindhuja Srinivasan is from Hyderabad, Andhra Pradesh.

Aathreya Ganapathy initially auditioned at Chennai, Tamil Nadu.

Nellaiappan Ram initially auditioned at Chennai, Tamil Nadu.

Nisar Rutin Shah is from Kerala.

Vaanathishri initially auditioned at Coimbatore, Tamil Nadu.

Sai Ramya auditioned at Hyderabad, Andhra Pradesh.

Saariga S. Ganga is from Kerala.

Larson Cyril initially auditioned at Coimbatore, Tamil Nadu. He previously appeared on Jaya TV's Ragamalika series.

Vasundhara Shivakumar initially auditioned at Bangalore, Karnataka.

Ajay Krishna Madurai, Tamil Nadu.

Madhumathi Venkat initially auditioned at Bangalore, Karnataka.

Shaanthini is from Kerala.

Sathish Kumar is from Bangalore, Karnataka.

Aravindh initially auditioned at Chennai, Tamil Nadu.

Anusha Ravi initially auditioned at Chennai, Tamil Nadu.

Ajay initially auditioned at Chennai, Tamil Nadu, and only just made it as a contestant on the show. However, he ceased appearing as a contestant on the show after the New Year Celebration Round.

=== Competition performance rounds ===
==== Contestant elimination chart ====
Contestants' listed in the order in which the finalists were announced as selected during the final audition rounds.

Finalist	Gender	Audition City in South India	Elimination Date	Placement
Shrinidhi	Female	Hyderabad, Andhra Pradesh		
Lekshmi Jayan	Female	Cochin, Kerala		
Somadas	Male	Cochin, Kerala		
Prathipaa	Female	Cochin, Kerala		
Keshav Vinodh	Male	Chennai, Tamil Nadu		
Tanuj Nair	Male	Chennai, Tamil Nadu		
Sindhuja Srinivasan	Female	Hyderabad, Andhra Pradesh		
Aathreya Ganapathy	Male	Chennai, Tamil Nadu		
Nellaiappan Ram	Male	Chennai, Tamil Nadu		
Nisar Rutin Shah	Male	Cochin, Kerala		
Vaanathishri	Female	Coimbatore, Tamil Nadu		
Sai Ramya	Female	Hyderabad, Andhra Pradesh		
Saariga S. Ganga	Female	Cochin, Kerala		
Larson Cyril	Male	Coimbatore, Tamil Nadu		
Vasundhara Shivakumar	Female	Bangalore, Karnataka		
Ajay Krishna	Male	Madurai, Tamil Nadu		
Madhumathi Venkat	Female	Bangalore, Karnataka		
Aravindh	Male	Chennai, Tamil Nadu		
Shaanthini	Female	Cochin, Kerala		
Sathish Kumar	Male	Bangalore, Karnataka		
Ajay	Male	Chennai, Tamil Nadu		
Anusha Ravi	Female	Chennai, Tamil Nadu		

==== Main competition rounds ====
Contestants and special performers were accompanied by Ganesh Kirupa Light Music Orchestra.

===== New Year (2015) Celebration Round - 2014 Hits (3 January 2015 – 11 January 2015) =====
- Judges: veteran playback singer S. P. Sailaja, music director Bharadwaj, and Carnatic music exponent Nithyasree Mahadevan
- Host: Vaishali
- Performances:

The first finals round of the season was telecast on 2 January 2015 in celebration of the New Year. The host announced this round as a celebration round in which no contestants would be eliminated. The top 22 contestants were required to perform hits from Tamil films released in the previous year, 2014. Before the performances were underway, an announcement was also made that as a New Year's gift, the best performing contestant(s) would be given a playback singing opportunity by music director Bharadwaj, one of the show's judges.

– Special performance by non-contestant performer

Episode (Air Date)	Order	Non-contestant Performer	Contestant(s)	Song	Original artist	Lyricist	Music director/composer	Movie (year)
31 (3 January 2015)	1		Ajay	"Oruthi Maelae"	Abhay Jodhpurkar & El Fé Choir	Madhan Karky	D. Imman	Jeeva (2014)
31 (3 January 2015)	2		Prathipaa	"Mounam Pesum"	K. S. Chithra & Sowmya Mahadevan	P. Vetriselvan	M. Ghibran	Amara Kaaviyam (2014)
31 (3 January 2015)	3		Sathish Kumar ("Babloo")	"Vinmeen Vithaiyil"	Abhay Jodhpurkar & Saindhavi Prakash	Kabilan	Nivas K. Prasanna	Thegidi (2014)
31 (3 January 2015)	4	Nithyasree Mahadevan		Short alapana excerpt in raga Kharaharapriya	Nithyasree Mahadevan	Traditional Carnatic music alapana	Nithyasree Mahadevan	
31 (3 January 2015)	5		Vasundhara	"Sonnadhu Sonnadhu"	Sadhana Sargam		Bharadwaj	Aranmanai (2014)
31 (3 January 2015)	6	Bharadwaj		Excerpt from "Sonnadhu Sonnadhu"	Sadhana Sargam		Bharadwaj	Aranmanai (2014)
31 (3 January 2015)	7		Nellaiappan	"Nee Yaaro"/"Yaar Petra Magano"	K. J. Yesudas	Yugabharathi	Anirudh Ravichander	Kaththi (2014)
32 (4 January 2015)	1		Vaanathishri	"Eeramaai Eeramaai"	Vibhavari & Ranjith	Jayant Kaikini	Ilaiyaraaja	Un Samayal Arayil (2014)
32 (4 January 2015)	2		Aravindh	"Vaanga Makka Vaanga"	Haricharan & Dr. Narayanan	Na. Muthukumar	A. R. Rahman	Kaaviya Thalaivan (2014)
32 (4 January 2015)	3		Somadas	"Oh Nanba"	S. P. Balasubrahmanyam & Aaryan Dinesh Kanagaratnam	Vairamuthu	A. R. Rahman	Lingaa (2014)
32 (4 January 2015)	4		Shaanthini	"Darling Dambakku"	Benny Dayal & Sunidhi Chauhan	Yugabharathi	Anirudh Ravichander	Maan Karate (2014)
32 (4 January 2015)	5		Larson Cyril	"Un Vizhigalil"	Anirudh Ravichander & Shruti Haasan	R D Raja and Shivaan Keithravindran	Anirudh Ravichander	Maan Karate (2014)
32 (4 January 2015)	6		Group of Top 22 Contestants	Medley (including excerpt from "Jingunamani" from Jilla)				
33 (10 January 2015)	1		Anusha Ravi	"Venmegam Polave"	G. V. Prakash Kumar & Saindhavi Prakash	Na. Muthukumar	Sharreth	Kathai Thiraikathai Vasanam Iyakkam (2014)
33 (10 January 2015)	2		Tanuj	"Raasa Magaraasaa"	Rita, Anthony Dasan & Sean Roldan	Muthamil	Sean Roldan	Mundasupatti (2014)
33 (10 January 2015)	3		Sindhuja	"En Mannava"	Srinivas & Aditi Paul	Vairamuthu	A. R. Rahman	Lingaa (2014)
33 (10 January 2015)	4		Nisar Rutin Shah	"Adiye Enna Raagam"	Abhay Jodhpurkar & Poornima Satish	Yugabharathi	D. Imman	Rummy (2014)
33 (10 January 2015)	5		Sariga S. Ganga	"Yeppa Maama Treatu"	D. Imman, A.V. Pooja, Snigdha Chandra	Viveka	D. Imman	Jilla (2014)
33 (10 January 2015)	6		Ajay Krishna	"Mersalaayiten"	Anirudh Ravichander & Neeti Mohan	Kabilan	A. R. Rahman	I (2014)
33 (10 January 2015)	7		Sai Ramya	"Naan Nee"	Shakthisree Gopalan & Dheekshitha	Uma Devi	Santhosh Narayanan	Madras (2014)
34 (11 January 2015)	1		Madhumathi	"Manasula Soora Kaathey"	RR & Divya Ramani	Yugabharathi	Santhosh Narayanan	Cuckoo (2014)
34 (11 January 2015)	2		Keshav Vinodh	"Aagayam Theepidicha"	Pradeep Kumar	Kabilan	Santhosh Narayanan	Madras (2014)
34 (11 January 2015)	3		Lekshmi Jayan	"Yaarumilla"	Shweta Mohan & Srinivas	Pa. Vijay	A. R. Rahman	Kaaviya Thalaivan (2014)
34 (11 January 2015)	4		Aathreya	"Ennai Saaithaalae"	Hariharan & Shreya Ghoshal	Thamarai	Harris Jayaraj	Endrendrum Punnagai (2013)
34 (11 January 2015)	5		Group of Top 22 Contestants	"Indhiya Naadu"	T. M. Soundararajan, M. S. Viswanathan, Malaysia Vasudevan, K. Veeramani, P. Susheela & L. R. Eswari	Vaali	M. S. Viswanathan	Bharatha Vilas (1973)

===== Tribute to "K.B Sir" Round (17 January 2015 – 8 February 2015) =====
- Judges: veteran playback singer S. P. Sailaja, music director Bharadwaj, and Carnatic music exponent Nithyasree Mahadevan
- Special Guest Judges: veteran playback singer Vani Jairam (episodes 35, 36, 37, 38, & 39), comedian actor Vivek (episodes 37 & 38) and playback violinist M. Kalyan (episodes 40, 41, 42, 43 & 44)
- Host: Vaishali
- Performances:

This unique round was in tribute to prominent film director, K. Balachander ("K.B Sir"). Throughout this round, each of the judges and chief guests made detailed comments filled with anecdotes about their experiences with the film director during their careers.

Musical performances by the judges, chief guests, and top 21 contestants during this round consisted of songs featured in films directed by K. Balachander.

Contestant Ajay did not participate or appear on the show for this round, and it was announced in the next round that he was no longer participating in the competition.

Contestant Shrinidhi gave a stand-out performance.

– Special performance by non-contestant performer

Episode (Air Date)	Order	Non-contestant Performer	Contestant(s)	Song	Original artist	Lyricist	Music director/composer	Movie (year)
35 (17 January 2015)
35 (17 January 2015)	1	Bharadwaj		"Kamban Yemandhan"	S. P. Balasubrahmanyam & Vani Jairam	Kannadasan	M. S. Viswanathan	Nizhal Nijamagiradhu (1978)
35 (17 January 2015)	2	S. P. Sailaja		Excerpt from "Tere Meri Beech"	S. P. Balasubrahmanyam	Anand Bakshi	Laxmikant–Pyarelal	Ek Duuje Ke Liye (Hindi film) (1981)
35 (17 January 2015)	3	S. P. Sailaja		Excerpt from "Balle Balle Magadivoy"	S. P. Balasubrahmanyam & L. R. Eswari	Aatreya	M. S. Viswanathan	Maro Charitra (Telugu film) (1978)
35 (17 January 2015)	4	Nithyasree Mahadevan		Excerpt from "Naan Oru Sindhu"	K. S. Chithra	Vairamuthu	Ilaiyaraaja	Sindhu Bhairavi (1985)
35 (17 January 2015)	5	Nithyasree Mahadevan		"Manmadha Masam"	Nithyasree Mahadevan & Shankar Mahadevan	Vaali	A. R. Rahman	Parthale Paravasam (1978)
35 (17 January 2015)	6	Vani Jairam		Medley of excerpts from 10 songs ("Ezhu Swarangalukkul"; "Naadham Ennum Kovilil"; "Kavidhai Kelungal"; "Kelviyin Naayagane"; "Mani Osai Enna"; "Ilakkanam Marutho"; "Azhagana Ilamangai"; "Naana Paaduvathu Naana"; "Vasantha Kaala" & "Antha Neram Poruthirunthal")	Vani Jairam	Kannadasan & Vairamuthu	M. S. Viswanathan (except Ilaiyaraaja for 3rd song and Vijaya Bhaskar for 7th song)	Apoorva Raagangal (1975); Manmadha Leelai (1976); Punnagai Mannan (2000); Apoorva Raagangal (1975); Nizhal Nijamagiradhu (1978); Thappu Thalangal (1978); Nool Veli (1979); Moondru Mudichu (1976) & Thillu Mullu (1981)
36 (18 January 2015)	1		Prathipaa	"Moothaval Nee"	K. Swarna & Trichy Loganathan	Kannadasan	V. Kumar	Arangetram (1973)
36 (18 January 2015)	2		Nellaiappan	"Madhuraiyil Parandha"	T. M. Soundararajan	Vaali	M. S. Viswanathan	Poova Thalaiya (1969)
36 (18 January 2015)	3		Shrinidhi	"Ezhu Swarangalukkul"	Vani Jairam	Kannadasan	M. S. Viswanathan	Apoorva Raagangal (1975)
36 (18 January 2015)	4		Sindhuja	"Ranga Rangiah"	P. Susheela	Kannadasan	M. S. Viswanathan	Varumayin Niram Sivappu (1980)
37 (24 January 2015)	1		Sariga S. Ganga	"Naan Oru Sindhu"	K. S. Chithra	Vairamuthu	Ilaiyaraaja	Sindhu Bhairavi (1985)
37 (24 January 2015)	2		Vaanathishri	"Oru Naal"	P. Susheela	Vaali	M. S. Viswanathan	Kaaviya Thalaivi (1969)
37 (24 January 2015)	3		Madhumathi	"Sollathaan Ninaikkiren"	M. S. Viswanathan & S. Janaki	Vaali	M. S. Viswanathan	Sollathaan Ninaikkiren (1973)
37 (24 January 2015)	4	Vivek		Excerpt from "Sollathaan Ninaikiren"	M. S. Viswanathan	Vaali	Yuvan Shankar Raja	Sollathaan Ninaikkiren (1973)
38 (25 January 2015)	1		Tanuj	"Sogame Ini Illai"	S. P. Balasubrahmanyam	Vairamuthu	Maragatha Mani Keeravani	Vaaname Ellai (1992)
38 (25 January 2015)	2		Ajay Krishna	"Junior Junior"	S. P. Balasubrahmanyam & Sadan	Kannadasan	M. S. Viswanathan	Avargal (1977)
38 (25 January 2015)	3		Somadas	"Maamaavukku Kudumaa Kudumaa"	Malaysia Vasudevan	Vairamuthu	Ilaiyaraaja	Punnagai Mannan (1986)
38 (25 January 2015)	4		Keshav Vinodh	"Kanaa Kaanum"	S. P. Balasubrahmanyam & Saritha	Vaali	M. S. Viswanathan	Agni Sakshi (1982)
39 (31 January 2015)
39 (31 January 2015)	1	Bharadwaj	(none - encore telecast)	Excerpt from "Kamban Emandhan"	S. P. Balasubrahmanyam & Vani Jairam	Kannadasan	M. S. Viswanathan	Nizhal Nijamagiradhu (1978)
39 (31 January 2015)	2	S. P. Sailaja	(none - encore telecast)	Excerpt from "Balle Balle Magadivoy"	S. P. Balasubrahmanyam & L. R. Eswari	Aatreya	M. S. Viswanathan	Maro Charitra (Telugu film) (1978)
39 (31 January 2015)	3	Nithyasree Mahadevan	(none - encore telecast)	"Manmadha Masam"	Nithyasree Mahadevan & Shankar Mahadevan	Vaali	A. R. Rahman	Parthale Paravasam (1978)
39 (31 January 2015)	4	Vani Jairam	(none - encore telecast)	Medley of excerpts from 10 songs (see item 6 from episode 35)	Vani Jairam	(see item 6 from episode 35)	(see item 6 from episode 35)	(see item 6 from episode 35)
39 (31 January 2015)	5	M. Kalyan (violin)		"Oru Naal"	P. Susheela	Vaali	V. Kumar	Major Chandrakanth (1966)
40 (1 February 2015)
40 (1 February 2015)	1	M. Kalyan (violin)						
40 (1 February 2015)	2		Sai Ramya	"Aavaram Poovu"	S. P. Balasubrahmanyam & P. Susheela	Vairamuthu	V. S. Narasimhan	Achamillai Achamillai (1984)
40 (1 February 2015)	3		Aathreya	"Punjai Undu"	S. P. Balasubrahmanyam	Muthulingam & Pulamaipithan	Ilaiyaraaja	Unnal Mudiyum Thambi (1988)
40 (1 February 2015)	4		Vasundhara	"Muthu Kulikka Vareegala"	T. M. Soundarajan & L. R. Eswari	Kannadasan	Viswanathan–Ramamoorthy	Anubavi Raja Anubavi (1967)
41 (7 February 2015)
41 (7 February 2015)	1	M. Kalyan (violin)	(none - encore telecast)	"Oru Naal"	P. Susheela	Vaali	V. Kumar	Major Chandrakanth (1966)
41 (7 February 2015)	2		Satish Kumar ("Babloo")	"Enna Saththam Indha Neram"	S. P. Balasubrahmanyam	Vairamuthu	Ilaiyaraaja	Punnagai Mannan (1986)
41 (7 February 2015)	3		Shaanthini	"Kaatrukkenna Veli"	S. Janaki	Kannadasan	Ilaiyaraaja	Avargal (1977)
41 (7 February 2015)	4		Aravindh	"Sathi Malli Poocharame"	S. P. Balasubrahmanyam	Pulamaipithan	Maragadha Mani	Azhagan (1991)
42 (8 February 2015)	1		Nisar Rutin Shah	"Manaivi Amaivadhellam"	K. J. Yesudas	Kannadasan	M. S. Viswanathan	Manmadha Leelai (1976)
42 (8 February 2015)	2		Anusha Ravi	"Azhage Sugama"	Srinivas & Sadhana Sargam	Vairamuthu	A. R. Rahman	Paarthale Paravasam (1999)
42 (8 February 2015)	3	M. Kalyan (violin)	Larson Cyril	"Vannila Nila Alla"	S. P. Balasubrahmanyam	Kannadasan	M. S. Viswanathan	Pattina Pravesam (1976)
42 (8 February 2015)	4	M. Kalyan (violin)						

===== Remake Song Round (14 February 2015 – 28 February 2015) =====
This unique round required the top 21 contestants to perform hit Tamil film songs which were remade from hit film songs in other South Indian languages (Telugu, Malayalam and Kannada languages). The first part of the round consisted of solo performances, and the second part consisted of duet performances.

At the commencement of the round, it was announced that contestant Ajay was no longer able to participate in the competition for an unavoidable reason, and that the next waitlisted contestant would be announced in the next round.

====== Solo Performances ======
- Judges: veteran playback singer S. P. Sailaja, music director Bharadwaj, and Carnatic music exponent Nithyasree Mahadevan
- Host: Vaishali
- Performances:

Contestant Lekshmi Jayan could not attend the set to perform for this round for unavoidable reasons, but was permitted to sing a song for this round via telephone link.

– Special performance by non-contestant performer

Episode (Air Date)	Order	Non-contestant Performer	Contestant(s)	Song	Original artist	Lyricist	Music director/composer	Movie (year)
43 (14 February 2015)
43 (14 February 2015)	1	S. P. Sailaja		Excerpt from "Aasaiyai Kaathula"	S. P. Sailaja	Gangai Amaran	Ilaiyaraaja	Johnny (1980)
43 (14 February 2015)	2		Shaanthini	"Laali Laali" ("Varam Thandha Swamikku")	P. Susheela	Vairamuthu	Ilaiyaraaja	Sippikkul Muthu (1986) (Dubbed version)
43 (14 February 2015)	3		Ajay Krishna	"Oh Paapaa"	Mano & K. S. Chithra	Vaali	Ilaiyaraaja	Idhayathai Thirudathe (1989) (Dubbed version)
43 (14 February 2015)	4		Sindhuja	"Aathaadi Amaadi"	K. S. Chithra	Vaali	Ilaiyaraaja	Idhayathai Thirudathe (1989) (Dubbed version)
43 (14 February 2015)	5		Nellaiappan	"Oru Paadal"	Vani Jairam & S. P. Balasubrahmanyam	Pulamaipithan	Shankar–Ganesh	Osai (1984)
43 (14 February 2015)	6	Bharadwaj & S. P. Sailaja		Excerpt from "Ek Pyaar"	Lata Mangeshkar & Mukesh		Laxmikant Pyarelal	Shor (1972)
44 (15 February 2015)	1		Vasundhara	"Endhan Kannil"	S. Janaki	Kannadasan	Ilaiyaraaja	Guru (1980)
44 (15 February 2015)	2		Aravindh	"Ennodu Paadungal"	S. P. Balasubrahmanyam	Vaali	Ilaiyaraaja	Naan Vazhavaippen (1979)
44 (15 February 2015)	3		Shrinidhi	"Om Namashivaya"	S. Janaki	Vairamuthu	Ilaiyaraaja	Salangai Oli (1983)
45 (21 February 2015)	1		Tanuj	"Poongaatru Puthithaanathu"	K. J. Yesudas	Kannadasan	Ilaiyaraaja	Moondram Pirai (1980)
45 (21 February 2015)	2		Vaanathishri	"Naane Varuven"	P. Susheela	Kannadasan	Vedha	Yaar Nee? (1966)
45 (21 February 2015)	3		Aathreya	"Aanandham Ennadaa"	S. P. Balasubrahmanyam		Raja Nagendra	Iru Nilavugal (1979)
45 (21 February 2015)	4		Sai Ramya	"Anbe Anbe"	P. Susheela	Muthulingam	Bappi Lahiri	Paadum Vaanampadi (1985)
45 (21 February 2015)	5		Madhumathi	"Dhoorathil Naan Kanda Un Mugam"	S. Janaki	Panchu Arunachalam	Ilaiyaraaja	Nizhalgal (1980)
45 (21 February 2015)	6	S. P. Sailaja		"Vennello Godari Andam" (Telugu language)	S. Janaki	Veturi	Ilaiyaraaja	Sitaara (1983)
46 (22 February 2015)	1		Anusha Ravi	"Rangeela Rangeela"	Sujatha	Vairamuthu	A. R. Rahman	Rangeela (1995) (Dubbed version)
46 (22 February 2015)	2		Keshav Vinodh	"Naanoru Disco"	S. P. Balasubrahmanyam	Vaali	Shankar–Ganesh	Paadum Vaanampadi (1985)
46 (22 February 2015)	3		Prathipaa	"Ponmeni Thazhuvaamal"	P. Susheela	Kannadasan	Vedha	Yaar Nee? 1966)
46 (22 February 2015)	4		Somadas	"Kaaviyam Paadavaa"	Mano	Vaali	Ilaiyaraaja	Idhayathai Thirudathe (1989) (Dubbed version)
46 (22 February 2015)	5		Nisar Rutin	"Vennmegam"	Hariharan	Na. Muthukumar	Yuvan Shankar Raja	Yaaradi Nee Mohini (2008)
47 (28 February 2015)	1		Larson Cyril	"Dhevathai Ilam"	S. P. Balasubrahmanyam	Vairamuthu	Ilaiyaraaja	Aayiram Nilave Vaa (1983)
47 (28 February 2015)	2		Sariga S. Ganga	"Poongaaviyam"	K. J. Yesudas, P. Susheela & K. S. Chithra	Vaali	Ilaiyaraaja	Karpoora Mullai (1991)
47 (28 February 2015)	3		Sathish ("Babloo")	"En Vaazhvile Varum Anbe Vaa"	S. P. Balasubrahmanyam	Panchu Arunachalam	Ilaiyaraaja	Thambikku Entha Ooru (1983)
47 (28 February 2015)	4		Lekshmi Jayan	"Aadal Paadal"	S. Janaki	Kannadasan	Ilaiyaraaja	Veetukku Veedu Vasapadi (1979)

====== Duet Performances ======
- Judges: veteran playback singer S. P. Sailaja and music director Bharadwaj
- Host: Vaishali
- Performances:

The host noted that Nithyasree Mahadevan was unable to attend to judge the show in this week's episode.

– Special performance by non-contestant performer

Episode (Air Date)	Order	Non-contestant Performers	Contestant 1	Contestant 2	Song	Original artist	Lyricist	Music director/composer	Movie (year)
48 (1 March 2015)	1		Keshav Vinod	Prathipaa	"Vaan Pole Vannam"	S. P. Balasubrahmanyam & S. P. Sailaja	Vairamuthu	Ilaiyaraaja	Salangai Oli (1983)
48 (1 March 2015)	2		Nissar Rutin ("Shah")	Sindhuja	"Uyire Uyire"	Mao	Pirai Sudan	M. M. Keeravani	Ellame En Kadhali (1995)
48 (1 March 2015)	3		Sai Ramya	Larson Cyril	"Mounamana Neram"	S. Janaki & S. P. Balasubrahmanyam	Vairamuthu	Illaiyaraja	Salangai Oli (1983)
48 (1 March 2015)	4		Aathreya	Vaanathishri	"Ponmane Kovam Yeno"	Unni Menon & Uma Ramanan	Vairamuthu	Illaiyaraja	Oru Kaidhiyin Diary (1985)
48 (1 March 2015)	5		Aravindh	Shaanthini	"Poove Unnai Nesithen"	S. P. Balasubrahmanyam & S. Janaki	Vairamuthu	Hamsalekha	Paruva Ragam (1987)
49 (7 March 2015)
49 (7 March 2015)	1	S. P. Sailaja & Bharadwaj			Medley song (excerpts in Tamil, Hindi and Telugu)	various	various	various	various
49 (7 March 2015)	2		Sathish Kumar	Vasundhara	"Vizhiyile Mani Vizhiyil"	S. P. Balasubrahmanyam & S. Janaki	Pulamaipithan	Ilaiyaraaj	Nooravathu Naal (1984)
49 (7 March 2015)	3		Anusha Ravi	Nellaiappan	"Paruvam Uruga"	S. Janaki & S. P. Balasubrahmanyam	Vaali	Ilaiyaraaja	Hare Radha Hare Krishna (1986)
49 (7 March 2015)	4		Tanuj	Madhumathi	"Oh Priyaa"	Mano & K. S. Chithra	Vaali	Ilaiyaraaja	Idhayathai Thirudathe (1989)
49 (7 March 2015)	5		Larson	Sariga	"Keeravani"	S. P. Balasubrahmanyam & S. Janaki	Vaali	Ilaiyaraaja	Paadum Paravaigal (1985)

===== "Puratchi Thalaivi" Birthday Celebration Round (8 March 2015 – 29 March 2015) =====
This unique round was in tribute to Puratchi Thalaivi ("Revolutionary Leader"): politician, actress, and artist, Jayalalithaa. The round celebrated Jayalalithaa's birthday and contributions. The first part of the round consisted of solo performances, and the second part consisted of duet performances.

In celebration of the show reaching a 50th episode milestone, veteran playback singer P. Susheela graciously accepted an invitation to appear on the show as a special guest judge over the first three episodes in this round.

====== Solo Performances ======
- Judges: veteran playback singer S. P. Sailaja, music director Bharadwaj, and Carnatic music exponent Nithyasree Mahadevan
- Special Guest Judge: veteran playback singer P. Susheela (episodes 50, 51, and 52)
- Host: Vaishali
- Performances:

– Special performance by non-contestant performer

Episode (Air Date)	Order	Non-contestant Performer	Contestant(s)	Song	Original artist	Lyricist	Music director/composer	Movie (year)
50 (8 March 2015)
50 (8 March 2015)	1	P. Susheela & S. P. Sailaja (Chorus by Bharadwaj & Nithyasree Mahadevan)	Chorus by various	"Santhanam Kungumam"	P. Susheela	Kannadasan	M. S. Viswanathan	Ragasiya Police 115 (1968)
50 (8 March 2015)	2		Lekshmi Jayan	"Ammamma Katruvanthu"	P. Susheela	Kannadasan	Viswanathan–Ramamoorthy	Vennira Aadai (1965)
50 (8 March 2015)	3		Nellaiappan	"Engey Aval"	T. M. Soundararajan	Pulamaipithan	M. S. Viswanathan	Kumari Kottam (1971)
50 (8 March 2015)	4		Shrinidhi	"Oraayiram Naadagam"	P. Susheela	Kannadasan	M. S. Viswanathan	Sumathi En Sundari (1971)
51 (14 March 2015)	1		Sariga S Ganga	"Ammano Samiyo"	L. R. Eswari & Sirkazhi Govindarajan	Kannadasan	T. K. Ramamoorthy	Naan (1967)
51 (14 March 2015)	2		Aathreya	"Thottu Kaatavaa"	T. M. Sondararajan	Kannadasan	M. S. Viswanathan	Thedi Vandha Mappillai (1970)
51 (14 March 2015)	3		Vaanathishri	"Unnai Naan Santhithaen"	P. Susheela	Vaali	Viswanathan–Ramamoorthy	Aayirathil Oruvan (1965)
51 (14 March 2015)	4	P. Susheela		Excerpt & humming of "Unnai Naan Santhithaen" followed by anecdote about D. K. Pattammal followed by humming of "Ammamma Katruvanthu"	P. Susheela	Vaali; Kannadasan	Viswanathan–Ramamoorthy	Aayirathil Oruvan (1965); Vennira Aadai (1965)
51 (14 March 2015)	5		Tanuj	"Naan Endral Adhu Avalum"	S. P. Balasubrahmanyam	Kannadasan	M. S. Viswanathan	Suryakanthi (1973)
52 (15 March 2015)	1		Shaanthini	"Chitukuruvikenna"	P. Susheela	Kannadasan	M. S. Viswanathan	Savaale Samali (1971)
52 (15 March 2015)	2	P. Susheela		Humming from "Chitukuruvikenna"	P. Susheela	Kannadasan	M. S. Viswanathan	Savaale Samali (1971)
52 (15 March 2015)	3		Aravind	"Thiruvalar Selviyo"	T. M. Soundararajan & B. Vasantha	Kannadasan	M. S. Viswanathan	Raman Thediya Seethai (1972)
52 (15 March 2015)	4		Madhumathi	"Yenna Yenna Vaarthaigalo"	P. Susheela	Kannadasan	Viswanathan–Ramamoorthy	Vennira Aadai (1965)
52 (15 March 2015)	5	P. Susheela		excerpt from "Yenna Yenna Vaarthaigalo"	P. Susheela	Kannadasan	Viswanathan–Ramamoorthy	Vennira Aadai (1965)
52 (15 March 2015)	6	S. P. Sailaja		Excerpt from "Poonthottam"	S. P. Sailaja		Ilaiyaraaja	Nathiyai Thedi Vandha Kadal (1980)
52 (15 March 2015)	7		Keshav Vinod	"Kadhal Malar Kootam"	T. M. Soundararajan	Kannadasan	M. S. Viswanathan	Deiva Magan (1969)
53 (21 March 2015)	1		Anusha Ravi	"Kannanyennum"	P. Susheela	Kannadasan	Viswanathan–Ramamoorthy	Vennira Aadai (1965)
53 (21 March 2015)	2		Sathish Kumar	"Paramasivan Kazhuthil"	T. M. Sondararajan	Kannadasan	M. S. Viswanathan	Suryakanthi (1973)
53 (21 March 2015)	3		Sai Ramya	"Oru Naal"	P. Susheela	Vaali	V. Kumar	Major Chandrakanth (1966)
53 (21 March 2015)	4		Ajay Krishna	"Naan Unnai Azhaikkavillai"	T. M. Soundararajan	Kannadasan	M. S. Viswanathan	Engirundho Vandhaal (1970)
53 (21 March 2015)	5		Sindhuja	"Kattazhagu Thangamagal"	P. Susheela	Alangadi Somu	M. S. Viswanathan	Kaavalkaaran (1967)
54 (22 March 2015)	1		Vasundhara	"Vandhaal Ennodu"	L. R. Eswari	Kannadasan	T. K. Ramamoorthy	Naan (1967)
54 (22 March 2015)	2		Nissar Rutin ("Shah")	"Paaduvor Paadinaal"	T. M. Soundararajan	Kannadasan	M. S. Viswanathan	Kannan En Kadhalan (1968)
54 (22 March 2015)	3		Prathipaa	"Paruvam Enathu Paadal"	P. Susheela	Vaali	Viswanathan–Ramamoorthy	Aayirathil Oruvan (1965)
54 (22 March 2015)	4		Larson Cyril	"Pottu Vaitha Mugamo"	S. P. Balasubrahmanyam & B. Vasantha	Kannadasan	Viswanathan–Ramamoorthy	Sumathi En Sundari (1971)

====== Duet Performances ======
- Judges: veteran playback singer S. P. Sailaja, music director Bharadwaj, and Carnatic music exponent Nithyasree Mahadevan
- Host: Vaishali
- Performances:

Judge S. P. Sailaja's comments throughout episode 55 were especially noteworthy. During episode 56, S. P. Sailaja also recounted in detail the circumstances surrounding her brother, S. P. Balasubrahmanyam singing the song Aayiram Nilave Vaa which was appreciated by viewers of the show.

Episode (Air Date)	Order	Contestant 1	Contestant 2	Song	Original artist	Lyricist	Music director/composer	Movie (year)
55 (28 March 2015)	1	Anusha Ravi	Nellaiappan	"Engirundho Aasaigal"	P. Susheela & T. M. Soundararajan	Vaali	M. S. Viswanathan	Chandhrodhayam (1966)
55 (28 March 2015)	2	Sariga	Ajay Krishna	"Naam Oruvarai"	L. R. Eswari & T. M. Soundararajan	Vaali	M. S. Viswanathan	Kumari Kottam (1971)
55 (28 March 2015)	3	Tanuj	Lekshmi Jayan	"Naanamo"	T. M. Soundararajan & P. Susheela	Vaali	Viswanathan–Ramamoorthy	Aayirathil Oruvan (1965)
55 (28 March 2015)	4	Aathreya	Vaanathishri	"Sirippul Undagum"	T. M. Soundararajan & P. Susheela	Kannadasan	M. S. Viswanathan	Engirundho Vandhaal (1970)
55 (28 March 2015)	5	Nissar Rutin ("Shah")	Sindhuja	"Chandrodayam Oru"	T. M. Sounderarajan & P. Susheela	Vaali	M. S. Viswanathan	Chandhrodhayam (1966)
56 (29 March 2015)	1	Sathish Kumar ("Babloo")	Sai Ramya	"Neeyethan Enakku"	T. M. Sounderarajan & P. Susheela	Vaali	M. S. Viswanathan	Kudiyirundha Koyil (1968)
56 (29 March 2015)	2	Keshav Vinod	Prathipaa	"Aayiram Nilave Vaa"	S. P. Balasuramanyam & P. Susheela	Pulamaipithan	K. V. Mahadevan	Adimai Penn (1969)
56 (29 March 2015)	3	Ajay Krishna	Shrinidhi	"Mellappo Mellappo"	T. M. Sounderarajan & P. Susheela	Alangadi Somu	M. S. Viswanathan	Kaavalkaaran (1967)
56 (29 March 2015)	4	Aravindh	Shaanthini	"Kunguma Pottin Mangalam"	T. M. Sounderarajan & P. Susheela	Roshanara Begum	M. S. Viswanathan	Kudiyirundha Koyil (1968)
56 (29 March 2015)	5	Nellaiappan	Madhumathi	"Minminyai Kanmani Kondavaney"	T. M. Sounderarajan & L. R. Eswari	Alangadi Somu	M. S. Viswanathan	Kannan En Kadhalan (1968)
56 (29 March 2015)	6	Larson Cyril	Vasundhara	"Kettukodi Uruvi Melam"	T. M. Sounderarajan & L. R. Eswari	Kannadasan	M. S. Viswanathan	Pattikada Pattanama (1968)

===== Stage Songs Round (4 April 2015 – 12 April 2015) =====
- Judges: veteran playback singer S. P. Sailaja, music director Bharadwaj, and Carnatic music exponent Nithyasree Mahadevan (except episode 60)
- Host: Vaishali
- Performances:

This round required the contestants to perform songs belong to a "stage song" genre, such as film songs which were picturised on a concert stage. The host and judges S. P. Sailaja and Bharadwaj noted that Nithyasree Mahadevan was unable to attend to judge the show in episode 60.

Before the commencement of the round, the judges gave detailed comments filled with anecdotes about their experience when they each performed on a concert stage for the first time.

The exchange between host Vaishali and contestant Vaanathishri before her performance in episode 59 was enjoyed by viewers, as was the exchange between Bharadwaj and Vaishali before the beginning of episode 60.

– Special performance by non-contestant performer

Episode (Air Date)	Order	Non-contestant Performer	Contestant(s)	Song	Original artist	Lyricist	Music director/composer	Movie (year)
57 (4 April 2015)	1		Keshav Vinod	"Then Mazhaiyile"	S. P. Balasubrahmanyam	Vairamuthu	V. S. Narasimhan	Pudhiavan (1984)
57 (4 April 2015)	2		Lekshmi Jayan	"Engirundho Azhaikkum"	Lata Mangeshkar	Panchu Arunachalam	Ilaiyaraaja	En Jeevan Paduthu (1988)
57 (4 April 2015)	3		Aravind	"Konji Konji"	S. P. Balasubrahmanyam	Panchu Arunachalam	Ilaiyaraaja	Veera (1994)
57 (4 April 2015)	4		Shrinidhi	"Ennai Yenna"	Sudha Raghunathan	Vaali	Ilaiyaraaja	Ivan (2002)
57 (4 April 2015)	5		Tanuj	"Manadhil Enna Ninaivugalo"	S. P. Sailaja & S. P. Balasubrahmanyam	Panchu Arunachalam	Ilaiyaraaja	Poonthalir (1979)
57 (4 April 2015)	6	S. P. Sailaja		Excerpt from "Manadhil Enna Ninaivugalo"	S. P. Sailaja & S. P. Balasubrahmanyam	Panchu Arunachalam	Ilaiyaraaja	Poonthalir (1979)
58 (5 April 2015)	1		Madhumathi	"Muththamizhil Paada"	Vani Jairam	Ulandhurpettai Shanmugam	Kunnakudi Vaidyanathan	Melnaattu Marumagal (1975)
58 (5 April 2015)	2		Aathreya	"Oru Kola Kili"	S. P. Balasubrahmanyam	Vaali	Ilaiyaraaja	Uzhaippali (1993)
58 (5 April 2015)	3		Vasundhara	"Poonthendrale"	P. Jayachandran & K. S. Chithra		S. A. Rajkumar	Manasukkul Mathappu (1988)
58 (5 April 2015)	4		Ajay Krishna	"Unnai Naan Parthathu"	S. P. Balasubrahmanyam	Vaali	Shankar–Ganesh	Pattikkaattu Raja (1975)
58 (5 April 2015)	5		Sariga S. Ganga	"Kannan Vandhu"	S. Janaki	Vaali	Ilaiyaraaja	Rettai Vaal Kuruvi (1987)
59 (11 April 2015)	1		Prathipaa	"Paartha Gnyaabagam Illaiyo"	P. Susheela	Kannadasan	Viswanathan–Ramamoorthy	Puthiya Paravai (1999)
59 (11 April 2015)	2		Sathish Kumar ("Babloo")	"Devan Thandha Veenai"	P. Jayachandran & S. Janaki	Kannadasan	Ilaiyaraaja	Unnai Naan Santhithen (1984)
59 (11 April 2015)	3		Vaanathishri	"Paartha Gnyaabagam Illaiyo"	Swarnalatha & K. J. Yesudas	Vaali	Ilaiyaraaja	Paattu Vaathiyar (1995)
59 (11 April 2015)	4		Nellaiappan	"Veesum Kaatrukku"	Harini & P. Unnikrishnan	Palani Bharathi	Karthik Raja	Ullaasam (1997)
59 (11 April 2015)	5		Sai Ramya ("Kutti Ponnu")	"Oru Iniya Manadhu"	Sujatha Mohan	Palani Bharathi	Ilaiyaraaja	Johnny (1980)
60 (12 April 2015)	1		Larson Cyril	"Vaasamilla Malar Idhu"	S. P. Balasubrahmanyam	T. Rajendar	T. Rajendar	Oru Thalai Ragam (1980)
60 (12 April 2015)	2		Shaanthini	"Devan Kovil"	S. Janaki	Muthulingam	Ilaiyaraaja	Naan Paadum Paadal (1984)
60 (12 April 2015)	3		Nissar Rutin ("Shah")	"Oru Poiyaavadhu Sol Kanne"	Hariharan	Vairamuthu	A. R. Rahman	Jodi (1999)
60 (12 April 2015)	4		Sindhuja	"Idhu Varai"	Andrea Jeremiah & Ajeesh	Gangai Amaran	Yuvan Shankar Raja	Goa (2010)
60 (12 April 2015)	5		Anusha Ravi & Aathreya Ganapathy	"Nenjam Paadum"	S. Janaki & S. P. Balasubrahmanyam	T. Rajendar	T. Rajendar	Nenjil Oru Ragam (1982)

===== Pudhu Mugam Arimugam Round (18 April 2015 – 26 April 2015) =====
- Judges: veteran playback singer S. P. Sailaja and music director Bharadwaj
- Host: Vaishali
- Performances:

This "Pudhu Mugam Arimugam" (New Face Debut) Round required the contestants to perform songs featured in films released between 2011 and 2015 by film directors making their debut in Tamil cinema.

– Special performance by non-contestant performer

Episode (Air Date)	Order	Non-contestant Performer	Contestant(s)	Song	Original artist	Lyricist	Music director/composer	Movie (year)
Episode 61 (18 April 2015)	1		Shaanthini	"Paarkathe Paarkathe"	Vijay Yesudas & Pooja Vaidyanath	Yugabharathi	D. Imman	Varuthapadatha Valibar Sangam (2013)
Episode 61 (18 April 2015)	2		Larson Cyril	"Unnale"	Shankar Mahadevan & Shreya Ghoshal	Na. Muthukumar	G. V. Prakash Kumar	Darling (2015)
Episode 61 (18 April 2015)	3		Shrinidhi	"Aathadi Manasudhan"	Priya Himesh	Na. Muthukumar	Yuvan Shankar Raja	Kazhugu (2012)
Episode 61 (18 April 2015)	4		Tanuj	"Adi Raangi"	Santhosh Hariharan	Yugabharathi	D. Imman	Saattai (2015)
Episode 61 (18 April 2015)	5	S. P. Sailaja		"Solla Kuyile"	S. P. Sailaja	MG. Vallabhan	Ilaiyaraaja	Ponnu Oorukku Pudhusu (1979)
Episode 62 (19 April 2015)	1		Sindhuja	"Kadhal Kanave"	Pradeep Kumar & Kalyani Nair	Muthamil	Sean Roldan	Mundasupatti (2014)
Episode 62 (19 April 2015)	2		Nissar Rutin ("Shah")	"Nee Paartha Vizhigal"	Vijay Yesudas & Swetha Mohan	Dhanush	Anirudh Ravichander	Darling (2015)
Episode 62 (19 April 2015)	3		Sai Ramya ("Kutti Ponnu")	"Kaathirundhai Anbe"	Chinmayi, Nivas & Abhay Jodhpurkar	Vairamuthu	Prem Kumar	Naveena Saraswathi Sabatham (2013)
Episode 62 (19 April 2015)	4		Aravindh	"Engae Pogudho Vaanam"	S. P. Balasubrahmanyam	Vairamuthu	A. R. Rahman	Kochadaiiyaan (2014)
Episode 62 (19 April 2015)	5		Vaanathishri	"Sahaayane"	Shreya Ghoshal	Yugabharathi	D. Imman	Saattai (2012)
Episode 63 (25 April 2015)	1		Sariga S. Ganga	"Kangal Neeye"	Sithara	Thamarai	G. V. Prakash Kumar	Muppozhudhum Un Karpanaigal (2014)
Episode 63 (25 April 2015)	2		Ajay Krishna					
Episode 63 (25 April 2015)	3		Anusha Ravi	"Yaaro Ivan"	Saindhavi Prakash Kumar & G. V. Prakash Kumar	Na. Muthukumar	G. V. Prakash Kumar	Udhayam NH4 (2013)
Episode 63 (25 April 2015)	4		Sathish Kumar ("Babloo")	"Mugilo Megamo"	Yuvan Shankar Raja & Ramya NSK		Ilaiyaraaja	Megha (2014)
Episode 63 (25 April 2015)	5		Madhumathi	"Un Perae Theriyathu"	Madhushree	Na. Muthukumar	C. Sathya	Engaeyum Eppothum (2011)

===== Hero Heroine Introduction Round (2 May 2015 – 10 May 2015) =====
- Judge: music director Bharadwaj
- Guest Judges: violinist Padma Shankar (episodes 65 & 66 only) & vocalist Binny Krishnakumar

– Special performance by non-contestant performer

Episode (Air Date)	Order	Non-contestant Performer	Contestant(s)	Song	Original artist	Lyricist	Music director/composer	Movie (year)
65 (2 May 2015)
65 (2 May 2015)	1	Bharadwaj		"Ulagam Pirandhadhu Enakkaga"	T. M. Soundararajan	Kannadasan	Viswanathan–Ramamoorthy	Paasam (1990)
65 (2 May 2015)	2	Binny Krishnakumar		"Rathi Sukha"		Jayadeva	Traditional Carnatic music composition	
65 (2 May 2015)	3	Padma Shankar (violin)		Medley in raga Kalyani (excerpts from "Vasudevayani"; "Mannavan Vanthanadi"; "Amma Endrazhaikkatha"; "Vaidhegi"; "Janani Janani")	(Traditional; P. Susheela; K. J. Yesudas; S. Janaki; Ilaiyaraaja, Deepan Chakravarthy & Krishnachandran)	(Thyagaraja; Kannadasan; Vaali; Gangai Amaran;)	(Thyagaraja; K. V. Mahadevan; Ilaiyaraaja; Ilaiyaraaja; Ilaiyaraaja)	(Traditional Carnatic music composition; Thiruvarutchelvar (1967); Mannan (1992); Pagal Nilavu (1985); Thai Moogambikai (1982))
65 (2 May 2015)	4		Aathreya	"Endendrum Punnagai"	Clinton Cerejo, Srinivas, Shankar Mahadevan, & A. R. Rahman	Vairamuthu	A. R. Rahman	Alai Payuthey (2000)
65 (2 May 2015)	5		Sindhuja	"Vanna Pungavanam"	K. S. Chithra	Muthulingam	Ilaiyaraaja	Eeramana Rojave (1991)
65 (2 May 2015)	6		Ajay Krishna	"Kutti Puli Kootam"	Hariharan, Tippu, Narayanan, Sathyan & Ranina Reddy	Viveka	Harris Jayaraj	Thuppakki (2012)
65 (2 May 2015)	7		Shaanthini	"Sha La La"	Sunidhi Chauhan	Pa. Vijay	Vidyasagar	Ghilli (2004)
Episode 66 (3 May 2015)	1		Anusha Ravi	"Sutrivarum Boomi"	Sadhana Sargam	Pa. Vijay	Vidyasagar	Jayamkondaan (2008)
Episode 66 (3 May 2015)	2		Keshav Vinod	"Kannai Kattikolathey"	Hariharan	Vairamuthu	A. R. Rahman	Iruvar (1997)
Episode 66 (3 May 2015)	3		Vasundhara	"Marghazhi Poove"	Shobha Shankar	Vairamuthu	A. R. Rahman	May Madham (1994)
Episode 66 (3 May 2015)	4		Larson Cyril	"Naan Romba Romba"	Ranjith	Na. Muthukumar	Vidyasagar	Siruthai (2010)
Episode 66 (3 May 2015)	5		Shrinidhi	"Ven Megham"	Shreya Ghoshal	Vairamuthu	A. R. Rahman	Guru (2007)

===== Dedication Round (16 May 2015 – 24 May 2015) =====
- Judge: music director Bharadwaj
- Guest Judges: violinist Padma Shankar & vocalist Binny Krishnakumar

Contestants had an opportunity to sing a song of their choice in dedication a person or people of their choice.

In episode 69, contestant Shrinidhi confirmed she was a disciple of prominent Carnatic music vocalist Nedunuri Krishnamoorthy, and judge Binny Krishnakumar confirmed she was a disciple of M. Balamuralikrishna.

Episode (Air Date)	Order	Contestant(s)	Song	Original artist	Lyricist	Music director/composer	Movie (year)
Episode 69 (16 May 2015)	1	Shrinidhi	"Kaatril Varum"	Hariharan, Sadhana Sargam & Shreya Ghoshal	Vaali	Ilaiyaraaja	Oru Naal Oru Kanavu (2005)
Episode 69 (16 May 2015)	2	Keshav	"Vaana Malai"	K. J. Yesudas	Vaali	Ilaiyaraaja	Idhu Namma Bhoomi (1992)
Episode 69 (16 May 2015)	3	Vasundhara	"Naadham Ennum"	Vani Jairam	Kannadasan	M. S. Viswanathan	Manmadha Leelai (1976)
Episode 69 (16 May 2015)	4	Tanuj	"Neeye Neeye"	KK	Yugabharathi	Srikanth Deva	M. Kumaran S/O Mahalakshmi (2004)

===== Challenging Round (30 May 2015 – 7 June 2015) =====
- Judge: music director Bharadwaj
- Guest Judges: violinist Padma Shankar & vocalist Binny Krishnakumar

===== SPB & Raajaa Birthday Celebration Round (13 June 2015 – 27 June 2015) =====
- Judges: music director Bharadwaj, veteran playback singer S. P. Sailaja & guest Binny Krishnakumar
- Special Guest: Prabhakar (Ilaiyaraaja's senior violin conductor)

This round celebrated the birthdays of playback singer, S. P. Balasubrahmanyam ("SPB"), and music director Ilaiyaraaja ("Raajaa"). Contestants were required to perform songs sung by SPB and composed by Raajaa. Special guest Prabhakar gave outstanding advice to the contestants, and to all music students generally at the commencement of the round. SPB's sister, S. P. Sailaja, returned to judge the show.

– Special performance by non-contestant performer

Episode (Air Date)	Order	Non-contestant Performer	Contestant(s)	Song	Original artist	Lyricist	Music director/composer	Movie (year)
79 (13 June 2015)
79 (13 June 2015)	1	Bharadwaj		Excerpt from "Panivizhum Malar"	S. P. Balasubrahmanyam	Vairamuthu	Ilaiyaraaja	Ninaivellam Nithya (1968)
79 (13 June 2015)	2	Bharadwaj		Excerpt from "Penn Oruthi Penn Oruthi"	S. P. Balasubrahmanyam	Vairamuthu	Bharadwaj	Gemini (2002)
79 (13 June 2015)	3	S. P. Sailaja		Excerpt from "Aayiram Malargalae"	S. P. Sailaja & Malaysia Vasudevan	Panju Arunachalam	Ilaiyaraaja	Niram Maaratha Pookkal (1979)
79 (13 June 2015)	4	S. P. Sailaja		Excerpt from "Aayiram Nilave"	S. P. Balasubrahmanyam & P. Susheela	Kannadasan	K. V. Mahadevan	Adimai Penn (1968)
79 (13 June 2015)	5	Binny Krishnakumar		Excerpt from "Enna Senjalum"			Ilaiyaraaja	
79 (13 June 2015)	6	Binny Krishnakumar		Excerpt from "O Vasantha Raajaa"	S. P. Balasubrahmanyam & S. Janaki	Pulamaipithan	Ilaiyaraaja	Neengal Kettavai (1984)
79 (13 June 2015)	7		Nellaiappan	"Neethane Endhan Ponvasantham"	S. P. Balasubrahmanyam	Vairamuthu	Ilaiyaraaja	Ninaivellam Nithya (1982)
79 (13 June 2015)	8		Shanthini	"Chinna Poo"	S. Janaki	Vaali	Ilaiyaraaja	Japanil Kalyanaraman (1985)
79 (13 June 2015)	9		Sathish Kumar	"Idhayam Oru Kovil"	Ilaiyaraaja, S. P. Balasubrahmanyam, & S. Janaki	Ilaiyaraaja	Ilaiyaraaja	Idaya Kovil (1985)
79 (13 June 2015)	10		Madhumathi	"Paattu Thalaivan"	S. P. Balasubrahmanyam	Ilaiyaraaja	Ilaiyaraaja	Idaya Kovil (1985)

===== Family Songs Round (28 June 2015 – 12 July 2015) =====
- Judges: music director Bharadwaj, veteran playback singer S. P. Sailaja & guest Binny Krishnakumar
- Special Guest Judges: Film director Vikraman (episode 86 only) & Carnatic music singers Priya Sisters (episodes 82 & 83 only)
- Host: Vaishali

===== Voice Change Round (18 July 2015 – 1 August 2015) =====
- Judges: music director Bharadwaj, veteran playback singer S. P. Sailaja & guest Binny Krishnakumar
- Host: Vaishali

This Maatru Kural Suttru ("Change Voice Round") required male contestants to perform film songs sung by female playback singers, and for female contestants to perform film songs sung by male playback singers.

===== Quarter Finals Round: Tribute to MSV (2 August 2015 – 16 August 2015) =====
- Judges: veteran playback singer S. P. Sailaja, music director Bharadwaj, & Carnatic music exponent Nithyasree Mahadevan (episodes 92 & 93 only)
- Guest Judges: violinist Padma Shankar & vocalist Binny Krishnakumar
- Host: Vaishali

The quarter finals round required the contestants to attend and perform songs composed by music director M. S. Viswanathan, who died earlier in the month. Nithyasree Mahadevan returned to judge the music competition reality show which pleased viewers. Nithyasree confirmed during episode 92 that she requested to be excused from attending several episodes due to commitments she made prior to the start of the competition.

Following the last performances of the round in episode 95, the judges announced their decision in respect of eliminating contestants. Bharadwaj announced that contestant Somadas and contestant Sariga S. Ganga were eliminated for being absent and failing to perform, which viewers agreed with. S. P. Sailaja announced that due to unavoidable circumstances, contestants Shrinidhi & Sai Ramya were unable to attend to perform in this round, but as performances could only be judged after attendance, both contestants were unfortunately eliminated by default. Other than these 4 contestants, the judges also eliminated 7 participating contestants: Sathish, Aravindh, Nellaiappan, Tanuj, Madhumathi, Prathipaa, and Sindhujaa. Viewers disagreed with the decision to eliminate Shrinidhi, Madhumathi, and Nellaiappan.

=== Highlight Performances ===
– Performance by non-contestant

Round	Episode No.	Performer/Contestant	Song	Original artist	Lyricist	Music composer/director	Source/Movie (year)
Spot Selection Round	13	S. P. Sailaja	Excerpt from "Chinnan Chiru Vayathil"	S. P. Sailaja	Kannadasan	Ilaiyaraaja	Meendum Kokila (1988)
Spot Selection Round	13	Sindhuja	"Meghame Meghame"	Vani Jairam	Vairamuthu	Shankar–Ganesh	Palaivana Solai (1981)
Spot Selection Round	14	Madhumathi	"Andha Sivagami"	P. Susheela	Kannadasan	R. Govardhanam	Pattanathil Bhootham (1967)
Spot Selection Round	17	Vaanathishri	"Maalai Pozhuthin"	P. Susheela	Kannadasan	Viswanathan–Ramamoorthy	Bhagyalakshmi (1961)
Solo Introduction Round	21	Shrinidhi	"Kavidhai Kelungal"	Vani Jairam & P. Jayachandran	Vairamuthu	Ilaiyaraaja	Punnagai Mannan (2000)
New Year Celebration Round	31	Nithyasree Mahadevan	Short alapana excerpt in raga Kharaharapriya	Nithyasree Mahadevan	Traditional Carnatic music alapana by Nithyasree Mahadevan		
New Year Celebration Round	31	Bharadwaj	Excerpt from "Sonnadhu Sonnadhu"	Sadhana Sargam		Bharadwaj	Aranmanai (2014)
Tribute to "K.B Sir" Round	35 & 39	Vani Jairam	Medley of excerpts from 10 songs	Vani Jairam	various	various	various
Tribute to "K.B Sir" Round	36	Shrinidhi	"Ezhu Swarangalukkul"	Vani Jairam	Kannadasan	M. S. Viswanathan	Apoorva Raagangal (1975)
Remake Song Round	45	Madhumathi	"Dhoorathil Naan Kanda Un Mugam"	S. Janaki	Panchu Arunachalam	Ilaiyaraaja	Nizhalgal (1980)
"Puratchi Thalaivi" Birthday Round	51	P. Susheela	Humming of excerpt from "Unnai Naan Santhithaen"	P. Susheela	Vaali	Viswanathan–Ramamoorthy	Aayirathil Oruvan (1965)
Stage Songs Round	57	S. P. Sailaja	Excerpt from "Manadhil Enna Ninaivugalo"	S. P. Sailaja & S. P. Balasubrahmanyam	Panchu Arunachalam	Ilaiyaraaja	Poonthalir (1979)
Stage Songs Round	59	Anusha Ravi	"Nenjam Paadum"	S. Janaki & S. P. Balasubrahmanyam	T. Rajendar	T. Rajendar	Nenjil Oru Raagam (1982)
Hero Heroine Introduction Round	65	Padma Shankar	Medley of excerpts from songs in raga Kalyani	various	various	various	various
Hero Heroine Introduction Round	65	Ajay Krishna	"Kutti Puli Kootam"	Hariharan, Tippu, Narayanan, Sathyan & Ranina Reddy	Viveka	Harris Jayaraj	Thuppakki (2012)
Dedication Round	69	Keshav Vinod	"Vaana Malai"	K. J. Yesudas	Vaali	Ilaiyaraaja	Idhu Namma Bhoomi (1992)
Voice Change Round	91	Madhumathi	"Mettuppodu Mettuppodu"	S. P. Balasubrahmanyam	Vairamuthu	A. R. Rahman	Duet (1994)
