= Pizhaikkum Vazhi =

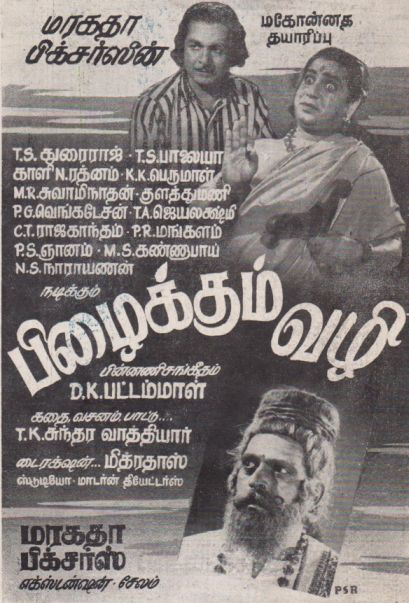
- Pizhaikkum Vazhi poster
- பிழைக்கும் வழி
- Directed by: R. Mithra Das
- Written by: T. K. Sundara Vaathiyar
- Story by: T. K. Sundara Vaathiyar
- Produced by: T. S. Durairaj; K . N. Palanivelu
- Starring: T. S. Durairaj; T. A. Jayalakshmi; T. S. Balaiah; Kali N. Rathnam; M. R. Swaminathan; C. T. Rajakantham
- Cinematography: J. G. Vijayam
- Edited by: G. Srihari
- Music by: Aswathamma
- Production company: Maragadha Pictures
- Release date: 16 September 1948
- Running time: 16,673 ft.
- Country: India
- Language: Tamil

Pizhaikkum Vazhi (transl. Way of Living) is an Indian Tamil language comedy film released in 1949 with T. S. Durairaj and T. A. Jayalakshmi in the lead roles.

== Plot ==
The hero (played by T. S. Durairaj) is an idler. He thinks it is easy to earn a living by cheating innocent and unsuspecting people. There is a fake 'swami' (M. R. Swaminathan) and the hero becomes a fake disciple of the 'swami'. He makes cheating the formula of his living. How he does it and what comes to him form the story.

== Cast ==
- T. S. Durairaj
- T. A. Jayalakshmi
- T. S. Balaiah
- Kali N. Rathnam
- M. R. Swaminathan
- Kulathu Mani
- K. K. Perumal
- P. G. Venkatesan
- C. T. Rajakantham
- P. S. Gnanam
- P. R. Mangalam
- C. K. Nagaratnam
- R. Saraswathi
- Bhagyalakshmi
- N. S. Narayana Pillai
- P. Sundara Rao

== Production ==
This is the first film produced by the comedian actor T. S. Durairaj.

== Soundtrack ==
Music was composed by G. Aswathaama and the lyrics were written by T. K. Sundara Vaathiyar. Singers are T. S. Durairaj, M. R. Swaminathan and Kali N. Rathnam. Playback singers are D. K. Pattammal and A. P. Komala.

The well-known Carnatic singer D. K. Pattammal rendered three songs in this film: ‘Enga naatukku entha naadu eedu...', ‘Kottai kattatheydaa...' and ‘Mudalai vaayil...'. T. S. Durairaj also sang a song 'Thuruppu (trumps) illaamey paruppu vegumaa....?' that was well received by the audience.

No.	Song	Singer	Lyrics	Duration (m:ss)
1	"Ayye En Arase Ennai"	T. S. Durairaj & M. R. Swaminathan	T. K. Sundara Vaathiyar	03:04
2	"Enga naatukku entha naadu eedu"	D. K. Pattammal	T. K. Sundara Vaathiyar	03:15
3	"Kottai Kattatheydaa"	D. K. Pattammal	T. K. Sundara Vaathiyar	02:45
4	"Mudnalai Vaayil Meendum"	D. K. Pattammal	T. K. Sundara Vaathiyar	02:42
5	"Pei Kondalainthalum"	Kali N. Rathnam & T. S. Durairaj	T. K. Sundara Vaathiyar	02:37
6	"Aasaiyum Anbum Nirainthidum"	A. P. Komala	T. K. Sundara Vaathiyar	02:59
7	"Vennai Thayir Paal Thirudum"	A. P. Komala	T. K. Sundara Vaathiyar	03:02
8	"Thuruppu Illaamey Paruppu Vegumaa"	T. S. Durairaj	T. K. Sundara Vaathiyar	
