= Lalitha Sivakumar =

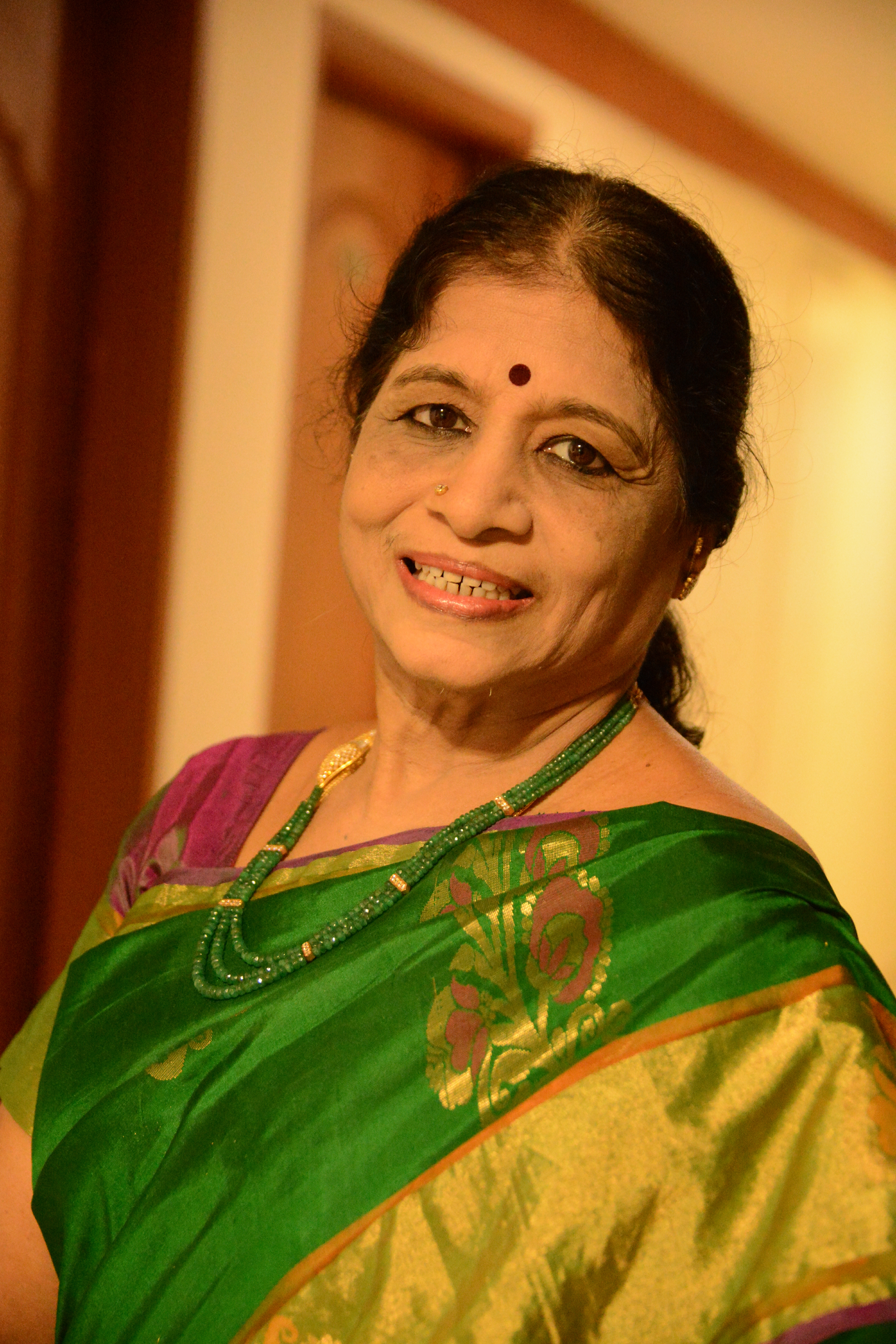
- Smt.Lalitha Sivakumar

Background information
- Born: Lalitha; Tamil Nadu, India
- Origin: India
- Genre: Carnatic
- Occupations: Musician, Teacher, Composer, Vocalist
- Years active: 1966 - Present

Lalitha Sivakumar is a Carnatic music teacher and composer. She was known for vocally accompanying her mother-in-law and leading Carnatic vocalist, the late D. K. Pattammal, in concerts,. Lalitha Sivakumar is also prominently known as the mother and guru of Nithyashree Mahadevan, a vocalist in Indian music. She is a well known veteran guru (teacher) of the D.K.P's school of Carnatic Music.

== Early life ==
Lalitha Sivakumar's father, Palghat Mani Iyer, was a mridangist in the field of Carnatic music, and was the first mridangist to win the Sangeetha Kalanidhi and Padmabhushan awards. At the age of 18, Lalitha Sivakumar was married to I. Sivakumar, son of D. K. Pattammal. The day after the wedding, she received training in Carnatic music from D. K. Pattammal.

== Career ==
Shortly thereafter, both as a solo performer and as a musician accompanying D. K. Pattammal, she received praise from several other leading Carnatic vocalists including D. K. Jayaraman, K. V. Narayanaswamy and M. S. Subbulakshmi. However, her career as a solo performer was brief, and she remained content vocally accompanying her guru.

Lalitha Sivakumar has composed, and set music to a number of kritis, tillanas, and bhajans, in a variety of Indian languages.

Several Organisations have recognised Smt.Lalitha Sivakumar's talent and contributions to the world of Carnatic music. Recently, On Recognising that A Musical Legacy continues, Madras South Lions Charitable Trust & RASA - A.R.P.I.T.A - Academy for Research & Performance of Indian Theatre Arts, together conferred the title 'ISAI RASA MAAMANI' on Smt.Lalitha & I.Sivakumar, on 4 January 2016.

Lalitha Sivakumar as the leader of the D.K.P. school of Carnatic Music, has taught many students from this school who have become professional performing artists. Other students who trained under her now work as music teachers in various countries. She has taught for many years and continues to instruct students in the Carnatic music traditions associated with D. K. Pattammal.

Lalitha Sivakumar has given Advanced Carnatic Vocal Training to the students directly and also virtually for students away from India. Other than Dr.Nithyasree Mahadevan, Lalitha Sivakumar's disciples also include Lavanya Sundararaman (her granddaughter), Dr.Niranjana Srinivasan, Pallavi Prasanna, Nalini Krishnan, Maharajapuram Srinivasan, Dr. Periyasamy and several others.

As a testimony to her music knowledge, Smt. Lalitha Sivakumar is the most preferred judge for several Carnatic Music competitions and Devotional Music competitions held throughout the year in India.
