= Nithyasree Mahadevan =

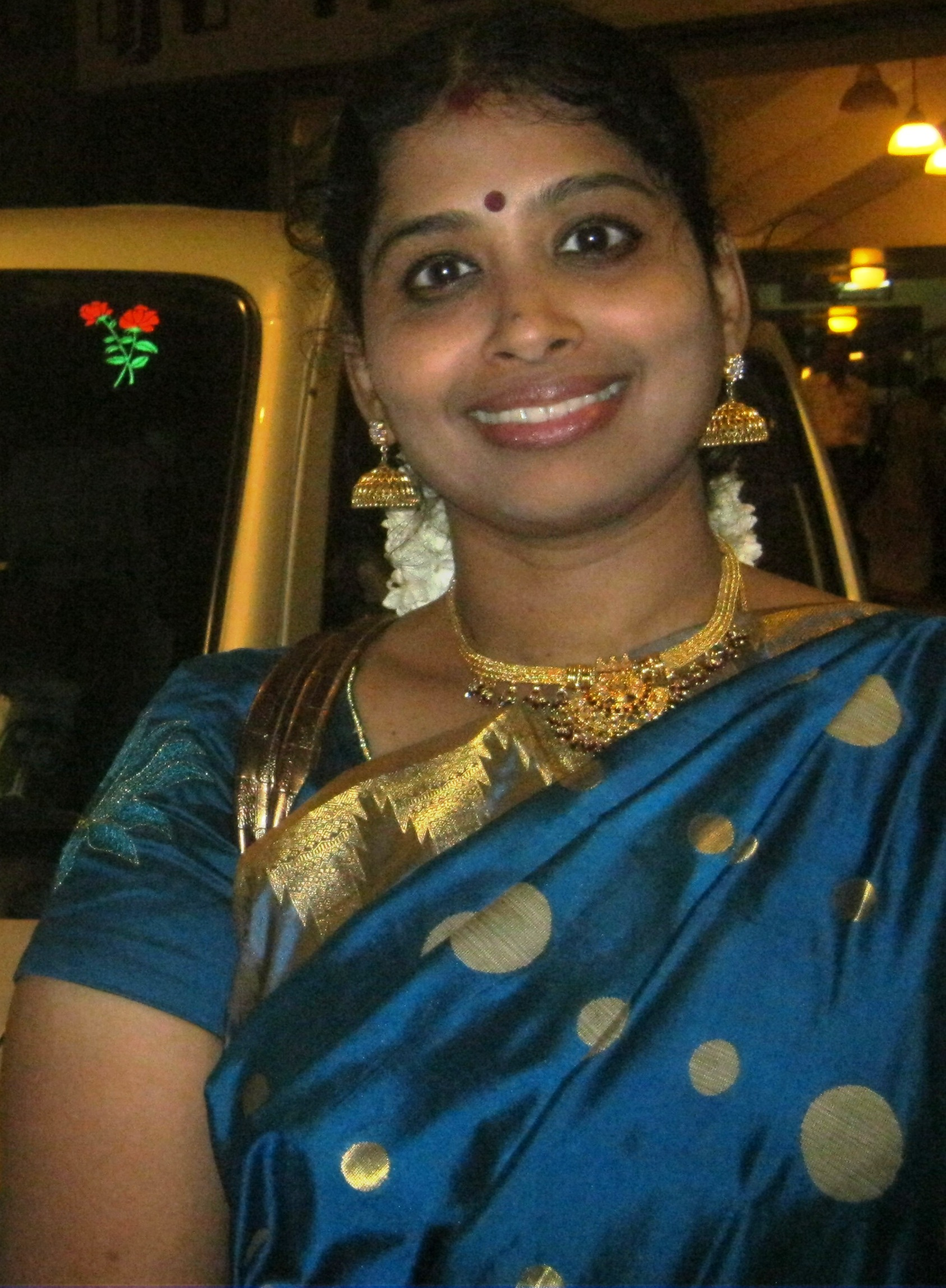
- Born: S. Nithyasree; 25 August 1973 (age 53); Thiruvaiyaru, Tamil Nadu, India
- Occupation: Singer
- Years active: 1987 – Present
- Spouse: V. Mahadevan (died.2012)
- Parent(s): Iswaran Sivakumar (father); Lalitha Sivakumar (mother)
- Honours: Kalaimamani Award (1999); Honorary Doctorate(2008)
- Musical career
- Genres: Carnatic; Indian classical music; Playback singing; Filmi
- Instruments: Vocals, Veena
- Labels: HMV; EMI; RPG; AVM Productions; Inreco; Vani; Amutham Music; Charsur Digital Workshop; Carnatica; Rajalakshmi Audio

Nithyasree Mahadevan (born 25 August 1973) is an Indian Carnatic musician and playback singer. A prominent vocalist, she has performed at all major sabhas (music organisations) in India and has released over 750 albums. Nithyasree Mahadevan is also known for her work as a playback singer in Indian cinema, particularly for her debut song, "Kannodu Kaanbadhellam," composed by A. R. Rahman for the 1998 film Jeans.

== Early life and background ==
Nithyasree was born to Lalitha Sivakumar and Iswaran Sivakumar. She comes from a distinguished musical lineage. Her paternal grandmother, D. K. Pattammal, and grand-uncle, D. K. Jayaraman, were celebrated Carnatic vocalists. Her maternal grandfather was the legendary mridangam virtuoso, Palghat Mani Iyer.

Nithyasree's initial musical training was under her mother, Lalitha Sivakumar. She later trained under her grandmother, D. K. Pattammal, and frequently accompanied both her mother and grandmother in their concerts. Her father, a skilled mridangam player, also accompanied her in performances.

== Musical career ==
=== Carnatic music ===
Nithyasree gave her first public concert at the age of 14 for the Youth Association For Classical Music on 10 August 1987. The performance was attended by prominent musicians including D. K. Pattammal, D. K. Jayaraman, and the chief guest, K. V. Narayanaswamy.

Throughout her career, Nithyasree has performed extensively across India and internationally, with concerts in the United States, Canada, the United Kingdom, Australia, and Singapore, among other countries. She is known for her thematic presentations, continuing her family's tradition of popularising compositions by poets such as Papanasam Sivan and Gopalakrishna Bharathi. She has also performed unique concerts, such as a three-hour performance in 1994 consisting entirely of 17 compositions in the raga Bhairavi. To commemorate the 50th year of Indian Independence, she performed several concerts featuring only patriotic songs.

=== Playback singing ===
Nithyasree's career as a playback singer began in 1998 when A. R. Rahman invited her to record "Kannodu Kaanbadhellam" for the film Jeans. The song was an immediate success and earned her the Tamil Nadu State Film Award for Best Female Playback Singer.

She continued to collaborate with Rahman on several popular songs, including "Minsara Kanna" for Padayappa (1999) and "Sowkiyama Kannae" for Sangamam (1999). Her other notable film songs include "Thaai Thindra Mannae" from Aayirathil Oruvan (2010) and "Kana Kaangiren" from Ananda Thandavam (2009). She has also recorded songs for films in other South Indian languages, including Kannada, Telugu, and Malayalam.

== Personal life ==
Nithyasree was married to V. Mahadevan until his death in 2012. They have two daughters, Tanujashree and Tejashree, who have occasionally accompanied her in concerts.

== Discography ==
List of songs recorded by Nithyasree.

Year	Film	Language	Song title	Music director	Co-singer
1998	Jeans	Tamil	Kannuodu Kaanbadhalam	A. R. Rahman	
1998	Jeans	Telugu	Kannulatho Choseve	A. R. Rahman	
1999	Padayappa	Tamil	Minsara Poove	A. R. Rahman	Srinivas & Palakkad Sreeram
1999	Padayappa	Telugu	Meriseti Puvvaa	A. R. Rahman	Srinivas & Palakkad Sreeram
1999	Sangamam	Tamil	Sowkiyama Kannae	A. R. Rahman	
1999	Poovellam Kettuppar	Tamil	Poove Poove (Female)	Yuvan Shankar Raja	
2000	Kshemamga Velli Labhamga Randi	Telugu	Joru Joruga	Vandemataram Srinivas	Sukhwinder Singh
2000	Manasunna Maaraju	Telugu	Eddulabandi Ekki	Vandemataram Srinivas	Sukhwinder Singh
2000	Moodu Mukkalaata	Telugu	Chinavaada Chinavaada	M. M. Srilekha	Mano
2000	Pennin Manathai Thottu	Tamil	Thiyagarajarin	S. A. Rajkumar	P. Unni Krishnan
2000	Sri Srimati Satyabhama	Telugu	Ice Cream Cuppulo	S. V. Krishna Reddy	
2001	Chandu	Telugu	Prema Nee Chirunama	K.Veeru	Jojo & Ramu
2001	Grama Devathe	Kannada	Shivaraja	Dhina	Shankar Mahadevan
2001	Grama Devathe	Telugu	Shankaruni Charithanni	Dhina	Harish Raghavendra
2001	Love Channel	Tamil	Desingu Raja	Deva	
2001	Paarthale Paravasam	Tamil	Manmadha Masam	A. R. Rahman	Shankar Mahadevan
2001	Paarthale Paravasam	Telugu	Manmadha Masam	A. R. Rahman	Shankar Mahadevan
2002	Panchathantiram	Tamil	Vandhaen Vandhaen	Deva	Sujatha & Kamal Haasan
2002	Samurai	Tamil	Oru Nadhi Oru Pournami	Harris Jayaraj	Tushara
2002	Sri Bannari Amman	Tamil	Kallaanalum Kanavanthan	T. Rajendar	Swarnalatha
2002	Villain	Tamil	Orae Manam	Vidyasagar	Hariharan
2003	Parasuram	Tamil	Jack And Jill	A. R. Rahman	Surjo Bhattacharya & Mathangi
2003	Sena	Tamil	Thirathathu Kathal	D. Imman	Unni Menon
2004	Apthamitra	Kannada	Raa Raa	Gurukiran	Rajesh Krishnan
2004	Ennavo Pudichirukku	Tamil	Iru Vizhi	Subhash Jawahar	
2004	New / Naani	Tamil	Kumbakonam Sandhaiyile	A. R. Rahman	Shankar Mahadevan & Manikka Vinayagam
2004	New / Naani	Telugu	Markandeya	A. R. Rahman	Shankar Mahadevan & Manikka Vinayagam
2005	ABCD	Tamil	Thavam Ondru	D. Imman	P. Balram
2005	Chandramukhi	Telugu	Vaarai Naan Unnai Thedi	Vidyasagar	
2005	Kannadi Pookal	Tamil	Hey Silu Silu	S. A. Rajkumar	Sirkazhi G. Sivachidambaram
2005	Mogudu Pellam O Dongodu	Telugu	Sata Koti Manmadha	Kabuli	
2006	Gandugali Kumara Rama	Kannada	Sarasake Baaro	Gurukiran	Hariharan
2006	Kalabha Kadhalan	Tamil	Pattuselai	Niru	Krishnaraj & Sriram
2008	Vallamai Tharayo	Tamil	Aayiram Yaanai	Bharadwaj	
2009	Ananda Thandavam	Tamil	Kana Kaangiren	G. V. Prakash Kumar	Shubha Mudgal & Vinitha
2009	Naan Avanillai 2	Tamil	Manmadha Leelai	D. Imman	Shail Hada & Benny Dayal
2010	Aayirathil Oruvan	Tamil	Thaai Thindra Mannae	G. V. Prakash Kumar	Vijay Yesudas & Shri Krishna
2010	Super Cowboy	Telugu	Kanna Namora Alakinchara	G. V. Prakash Kumar	Navin Iyer & D.A.Srinivas
2010	Yuganiki Okkadu	Telugu	Singaarinchina	G. V. Prakash Kumar	Vijay Yesudas
2012	Arike	Malayalam	Varavayi Thozhi Vadhuvayi	Ouseppachan	
2015	Panjumittai	Tamil	Kaattu Karuvamulla	D. Imman	T. L. Maharajan
2018	Mohini	Tamil	Mohini's Rage	Melvin	
2018	NOTA	Telugu	Raja Raja Kula	Sam C. S.	Abhay Jodhpurkar
2021	Udanpirappe	Tamil	Karambakudi Kanaga	D. Imman	Jayamoorthy

=== Music Director and Composer ===
Nithyasree Mahadevan has composed music for songs, and has composed background scores for studio album recordings.

=== Semmozhi Anthem ===
Nithyasree Mahadevan was one among the singers who sang the "Semmozhiyaana Thamizh Mozhiyaam" song for the World Classical Tamil Conference 2010. She also appeared on the screen after Aruna Sayeeram and was followed by S. Sowmya.

== Television works ==
Nithyasree has appeared as a guest judge in various reality TV music talent shows, often aired on Tamil language TV channels. She first appeared as a guest judge in Sun TV's Sapthaswarangal. She later appeared as a guest judge in several episodes and rounds of Zee Tamil's Sa Re Ga Ma Pa 2009 Challenge, before appearing as a judge for STAR Vijay in seasons 2, 3, and 4 of Airtel Super Singer Junior, seasons 3, 4, and 5 of Airtel Super Singer, the debut episode of Super Singer Celebrity Season, and Nippon Paint Super Singer Junior season 5. She also appeared as a guest judge on episodes 22 and 23 of Indian Voice which was aired in October 2012 on Mazhavil Manorama, a Malayalam language TV channel, and as a guest judge for the finals of season 6 of Raj TV's Raja Geetham, which was held on 6 August 2015 at Kamarajar Arangam, and subsequently aired on 15 August 2015. Nithyashree appeared as a special guest for the debut season of Zee Tamil's Sa Re Ga Ma Pa Lil Champs. In March 2018, she returned as a special guest in the classical round of Sa Re Ga Ma Pa Seniors, a week after the tribute round to music director M. S. Viswanathan featuring special guests Vani Jairam and P. Susheela was telecast. During March 2018, Nithyashree also made her first appearance as a special guest judge in Sun TV's Sun Singer.

Nithyasree was also a permanent judge in reality TV music talent shows. In 2014, Nithyasree was a permanent judge in season 3 of Raj TV's Carnatic music reality-talent show, Tanishq Swarna Sangeetham, having previously appeared as a guest judge at various levels in earlier seasons of the show. Nithyasree also appeared as a permanent judge in the debut season of Jaya Super Singer South India which was aired on Jaya TV between 2014 and 2015.

She sang several advertisement jingles for various companies, including more recently Sree Kumaran Thangamaligai which was recorded and aired on various Tamil language TV channels. Nithyasree has also sung title songs for various TV serials which were recorded and telecast in South India, including Chithi - a mega serial originally aired on Sun TV.

Serial name	Music director	Channel(s)
Chithi	Dhina	Sun TV
Krishnadasi	D. Imman	Sun TV & Raj TV
Metti Oli	Dhina	Sun TV
Buvaneshwari	Ramesh	Sun TV
Arasi	Kiran	Sun TV
Mythili	S. P. Venkatesh	Kalaignar TV
Uravugal	D. Imman	Sun TV
Kanchana		STAR Vijay
Anni		Jaya TV
Engirundho Vandhal		Jaya TV
Kakka Kakka		Raj TV

=== Titles, awards and other recognition ===
Nithyasree is a "Top Rank" graded artist of Akashvani, and All India Radio, Chennai. She received the "Best Concert Award" for 6 years from the Madras Music Academy, and won the Kalaimamani award in 1999 from the Government of Tamil Nadu, who subsequently appointed her as a member in the Expert Committee panel in the "IYAL ISAI NATAKA MANDRAM". During her career, Nithyasree has been bestowed with numerous other titles, and won numerous other awards and prizes.

Year	Honour	Honouring bestowed or presented by	Ref
1987	Best Main Artist Award	YACM	
1989	Papanasam Sivan Tambura Prize		
1990	First Prize in AIR music competition (Indian National Level)	All India Radio	
1990	"Best Promising Artiste"	Mohanam Maharajapuram Santhanam Trust	
1994	"Yuva Kala Bharathi"	Bharath Kalachar	
1994	"Innisai Mamani"	Tamil Nadu Goodwill and Welfare Association	
	National Unity Centre Award		
	Best Pallavi Music Reciter Award		
1996	M. L. Vasanthakumari Memorial Award	Mylapore Academy	
1999	"Naadha Bhooshanam"	Shanmukhanandha Sangeetha Sabha (Delhi)	
1999	"Ugadhi Puraskar"	Madras Telugu Academy	
1999	"Sunadhavinodhini"	Swami Omkaaraananda	
1999	"Bala Ratna"	Bala Tripura Sundari Trust Nemili	
1999	"Gaanaamrutha Vaani"	All Ceylon Hindu Congress (Colombo)	
1999	Kannadhasan Award		
1999	Kalaignar Award		
1999	Kalaimamani	Government of Tamil Nadu	
2000	Melvin Jones Award for Extraordinary Person	Lions Club Chennai	
2000	"Sangeetha Shikhamani"	Madras Telugu Association	
2001	"Isai Peroli" and award	Karthik Fine Arts	
2001	Vani Kala Sudhakara Award	Sri Thyaga Brahma Gana Sabha, presented on 10 December 2001	
2001	Desiya Orumaipadu Maiyam Award		
2001	"Navarasa Gana Nayaki"	Tamil Aanmeega Peravai	
2002	"Udhavum Oli"	Vasantha Memorial Trust Coimbatore	
2002	Sivaji Award		
2002	"Sangeetha Parambarya Rathna"	Kanchi Kamakoti Peetham	
2003	Shanmuka Shikamani Award	Shanmukanandha Fine Arts (Mumbai)	
2003	Excellence Award	Rotary Club	
2004	"Isai Mani Makutam"	Rajalakshmi Fine Arts Coimbatore	
2004	"Padma Sadhana" (Title)	Padma Sarangapani Cultural Association (conferred by Madras High Court judge, Justice T.V.Masilamani on 3 January 2004 in Virugambakkam, Chennai)	
2006	"Tamil Isai Vani"	Dubai Tamil Kudumbam	
2006	"Isai Kalai Tharakai"	Canberra Music Association	
2006	"Naadha Kovidha" (Title)	Naadhabrahmam (conferred by Madras High Court judge, Justice M. Chockalingam on 26 December 2006 in Chennai)	
2008	Jayarathna Virudhu Award	Jayadhaarini Trust (conferred on 22 October 2008 in Chennai)	
2008	Honorary Doctorate of Literature	Sathyabama Autonomous University on 19 April 2008	
2008	"Sangeetha Kala Shironmani"	Nungambakkam Cultural Academy	
2010	"Gaana Padmam" Award (and Title)	Brahma Gana Sabha, presented on 3 December 2010 in Chennai	
2010	"Sangeetha Kalasarathy" Award (and Title)	Parthasarathy Swami Sabha, presented on 15 December 2010 in Chennai	
2010	Acharya Award	Naradha Gana sabha (Celebrating Teachers Day)	
2011	Sangeetha Hamsa Award	Hamsavinodhini, presented on 1 December 2011 at Arulmigu Kasi Viswanathar Temple, West Mambalam.	
2011	"Isai Mamani" Award	Shri Rama Bhaktha Jana Samaj, presented on 20 December 2011	
2011	P. Obul Reddy Award of Excellence	Bharathiya Vidya Bhavan, Chennai	
2012	"M. S. Subbulakshmi Puraskar"	Visakha Music Academy, presented on 12 January 2012	
2012	Award Of Proficiency	Tamil Nadu Brahmins Association (TAMBRAS)	
2013	"Sangeetha Ulagin Naayaki"	Aadhi Shankarar Aanmeega Peravai at Kutthalam	
2013	"Sivan Isai Selvi" (Title)	Papanasam Sivan Rasigar Manram (conferred by vocalist P. S. Narayanaswamy in September 2013 at Narada Gana Sabha in Chennai)	
2014	Isai Selvam Award	Presented by Karunanidhi under the banner of Muthamizh Peravai on 24 January 2014 in Chennai	
2017	"Tamil Isai Thilakam" (Title)	Presented by New York Tamil Sangam on 28 May 2017	
2017	Sangeetha Choodamani Award	Sri Krishna Gana Sabha, conferred by E. S. L. Narasimhan) on 5 August 2017	
2018	Viswa Kala Bharathi Award	Bharat Kalachar	
2022	“Excellence in music”	Just for women(JFW achievers award-2022)	
