= D. K. Pattammal =

Damal Krishnaswamy Pattammal
- Born: 19 March 1919; Conjeevaram, Madras Presidency, British India (now Kancheepuram, Tamil Nadu, India)
- Died: 16 July 2009 (aged 90) Chennai, Tamil Nadu, India
- Genres: Carnatic music and playback singing
- Occupations: singer
- Years active: 1929–2009
- Labels: His Master's Voice, EMI, RPG, AVM Audio, Inreco, Charsur Digital Workshop etc.

Damal Krishnaswamy Pattammal (19 March 1919 – 16 July 2009), popularly known as D. K. Pattammal or DKP, was an Indian Carnatic musician and a playback singer for film songs in Tamil. Pattammal, along with her contemporaries M. S. Subbulakshmi and M. L. Vasanthakumari, are popularly referred to as the female trinity of Carnatic Music. This trio initiated the entry of women into mainstream Carnatic Music. She has been appreciated all over the world by Carnatic music lovers.

== Early life and background ==
Pattammal was born in a Brahmin family in Kancheepuram of Tamil Nadu, India. She was named Alamelu, but fondly called "Patta" as a child prodigy. Her father, Damal Krishnaswamy Dikshithar, who was deeply interested in music, inspired her to learn Carnatic music. Her mother, Kanthimathi (Rajammal), although a talented singer herself, was not permitted to sing even for friends or relatives in line with strict orthodox tradition. Despite her orthodox background, Pattammal sang and showed considerable music talent at an early age. Her parents initiated her into devotional singing.

Pattammal did not receive formal training in a systematic manner beginning with the basics. She also did not receive regular gurukula training; in accordance with those times, women, especially from conservative families, were constrained from attending gurukula training. She initially received tuition from an unnamed Telugu-speaking musician, whom she called "Telugu vadyar" or "Telugu teacher", who also taught her Telugu and Sanskrit. She later learnt music from her mother, some disciples of C Subramanya Pillai (popularly known as Naina Pillai), as well as Rajalakshmi, daughter of Veena Dhanammal. Pattammal also learnt from Ambi Dikshitar, a grandson of prolific composer Muthuswamy Dikshitar. Pattammal subsequently continued learning compositions of Dikshitar from musicologist and former Supreme Court judge, T. L. Venkatarama Iyer. She also studied directly under Papanasam Sivan, a prolific Tamil composer.

As a child, Pattammal sat through Carnatic music concerts, and on returning home, notated the kritis she heard, and key phrases of ragas. Her brothers D. K. Ranganathan, D. K. Nagarajan, and D. K. Jayaraman – later her vocal accompanists, helped her in this task. She also sang simple devotional hymns and songs her father taught her. There was no radio or recorded music which was available in those times.

After she married R. Iswaran in 1939, Pattammal continued her pursuit of music while fulfilling the domestic duties of a traditional housewife, getting up as early as 4am to begin her day.

== Singing career ==
At age eight, Pattammal won first prize for singing Thyagaraja's "Raksha Bettare" in Bhairavi, at a competition conducted by C Subramanya Pillai (popularly known as Naina Pillai), whom Pattammal admired deeply. According to Pattammal, Naina Pillai would host Thyagaraja Utsavams (festivals dedicated to Tyagaraja) in Kancheepuram every year, and was a veteran in the art of singing Ragam Thanam Pallavi.

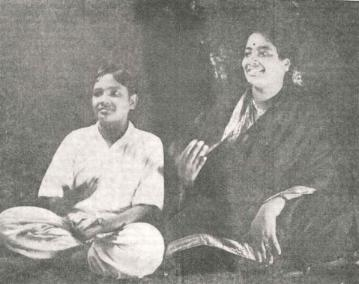
DK Pattammal (right) in concert with her brother, D. K. Jayaraman; circa early 1940s.

In 1929, at age 10, Pattammal gave her first radio performance for Madras Corporation Radio (now known as AIR). In 1933, at age 13, Pattammal gave a full-length public concert at Madras Rasika Ranjani Sabha; she is considered the first woman from a Brahmin-caste family to do so. In the same year, her music was first captured in recording discs by the Columbia Company, as it was then known. One year later, she moved to Chennai to become a regular performer in concerts and gave her first performance at the Mahila Samajam (the Egmore Ladies Club), and won acclaim. She quickly rose to stardom, and her musical career spanned more than 65 years. In 1936, she gave her maiden performance at the Madras Music Academy.

D. K. Pattammal's knowledge was encyclopaedic; she was considered as an authority on Muthuswami Dikshitar's compositions, and is also known for her renditions of these. She learnt authentic versions of these compositions from Ambi Dikshitar, a descendant of Muthuswami Dikshitar, as well as Justice T. L. Venkatrama Iyer, an authority on Dikshithar's compositions. She popularised several Dikshithar's compositions in her concerts, and also sang Tiruppugazhs and Tevarams that she learnt from Appadurai Achari. Pattammal also learnt many compositions of Papanasam Sivan, directly from the composer himself. She went on to popularise these compositions of Papanasam Sivan, as well as those of Subramania Bharathiyar, both in film and Carnatic music.

Pattammal started a few revolutionary trends in Carnatic music. She was the first Brahmin woman to have performed this genre of music publicly. Brahmins ranked as the highest in the caste hierarchy prevalent in India in the early 20th century, and society considered it taboo for a Brahmin woman to perform on stage.

Pattammal was also the first woman to have performed Ragam Thanam Pallavi in concerts. Ragam Thanam Pallavi, which was classed as a male stronghold, is the most difficult concert item in Carnatic music, as it calls for great skill and a high degree of concentration to handle the rhythmic complexities involved. Pattammal went further to perform very complex Pallavis in intricate talas (rhythmic cycles); impressing and earning the respect of her male peers, connoisseurs and fellow-musicians. Her singing of pallavis was technically perfect, and aesthetically pleasing. For this reason, she became dubbed "Pallavi Pattammal". She learnt a few pallavis and compositions from Naina Pillai, and several from Vidyala Narasimhalu Naidu, the nephew of Tirupati Narayanaswami Naidu, a prominent composer of javalis. Today, many female Carnatic musicians perform Ragam Thanam Pallavi as the main item in their concerts.

=== Films ===
Pattammal was one of the earliest Carnatic musicians to sing in films, and was introduced in this medium by Papanasam Sivan. Although she received many offers to sing for films, she only accepted those that involved devotional or patriotic songs, and declined offers to sing romantic songs. The first film Pattammal sang in was Thyagabhoomi (1939). A scene, towards the end of the film, showed a group of freedom fighters marching in a procession, carrying the Indian National Congress party flag, with "Desa Sevai Seyya Vaareer" being sung by Pattammal in the background. The song, written by Kalki (R. Krishnamurthy) and tuned by Papanasam Sivan, highlighted the Freedom Movement and invited people to join. The fame that the film and the song generated led to both being banned by the British government.

Pattammal popularised several patriotic compositions of Subramania Bharathiyar. In Naam Iruvar (1947), her renditions of "Vetri Ettu Dhikkum Etta", and "Aaduvome Pallu-p- Paduvome", a remarkably prescient creation celebrating a free India, went on to be big hits. In Raama Raajyam (1948), Pattammal popularised Subramania Bharathi's "Thoondir Puzhvinai-p-pol", and she made his composition, "Theeradha Vilayattu Pillai", Vedhala Ulagam (1948) a favourite with listeners. Pattammaal's singing, along with the dancing of Baby Kamala in the film, made the latter of these especially memorable. In AVM's Vaazhkai (1949 film), where Vyjayanthimala was introduced to film acting, Pattammaal sang the nationalist poet's "Bharatha Samudhaayam Vaazhgave". Pattammal also had the rare honour of performing at the foundation-laying ceremony of the Bharathi Memorial at Ettayapuram.

Pattammal sang in other films including Mahatma Urangaar (1947), Pizhaikkum Vazhi (1948), Laavanya (1951). The last film song Pattammaal sang was at the age of 80 for the Tamil film Hey Ram (2000). Ilaiyaraaja and Kamal Haasan carted recording equipment to her home and had her sing "Vaishnav Janato", a favourite of Mahatma Gandhi, for the film.

Year	Film	Language	Song	Music	Lyrics
1939	Thyagabhoomi	Tamil	Desa Sevai Seyya Vaareer	Papanasam Sivan	Kalki R. Krishnamurthy
1946	Tyaagayya	Telugu	Purandaradaasa Devara Nama	Chittor V. Naagaiah	Papanasam Sivan
1947	Nam Iruvar	Tamil	Vettri Ettu Dhikkum	R. Sudarsanam	Subramania Bharathiyar
1947	Nam Iruvar	Tamil	Aaduvome Pallu Paduvome	R. Sudarsanam	Mahakavi Subramaniya Bharathiyar
1947	Mahathma Utthangaar	Tamil	Kaana Aaval Konden Iru Vizhigalal	S. V. Venkatraman & T. R. Ramanathan	Papanasam Sivan
1947	Mahathma Utthangaar	Tamil	Kunchitha Paadham Ninainthu Urugum	S. V. Venkatraman & T. R. Ramanathan	Papanasam Rajagopala Iyer
1947	Miss Maalini	Tamil	Sree Saraswathi Namasthudhe	S. Rajeswara Rao & Parur S. Anantharaman	Kothamangalam Subbu
1948	Raama Rajyam	Tamil	Enakkun Irupadham Ninaikka	R. Sudarsanam	Arunachala Kavirayar
1948	Vedhala Ulagam	Tamil	Thoondir Puzhuvinaipol	R. Sudarsanam	Subramania Bharathiyar
1948	Vedhala Ulagam	Tamil	Theeradha Vilayattu-p- Pillai	R. Sudarsanam	Subramania Bharathiyar
1948	Pizhaikkum Vazhi	Tamil	Engal Naattukku Endha Naadu Eeedu Perinba Gnana Veedu	G. Aswathama	T. K. Sundara Vaathiyar
1948	Pizhaikkum Vazhi	Tamil	Kottai Kattathedaa	G. Aswathama	T. K. Sundara Vaathiyar
1948	Pizhaikkum Vazhi	Tamil	Mudhalai Vaayil	G. Aswathama	T. K. Sundara Vaathiyar
1949	Vaazhkkai	Tamil	Bhaaratha Samudhaayam Vaazhgave	R. Sudarsanam	Mahaakavi Subramaniya Bhaarathiyar
1950	Jeevitham	Telugu	Aandhra Yugakka Neevi Jayamuraa	R. Sudarsanam	
1951	Lavanya	Tamil	Pazham Bhaaratha Nannaadu	S. V. Venkatraman	Papanasam Sivan
1951	Lavanya	Tamil	Thanga Oru Nizhal Illaiye	S. V. Venkatraman	Papanasam Sivan
2000	Hey Ram	Tamil	Vaishnava Janato	Ilaiyaraaja	Krishnaswamy Iyer

Pattammal was one of the artists in Jana Gana Mana video album composed by A. R. Rahman which was released on 26 January 2000 to mark the 50th year of the Indian Republic. Pattammaal who, at 80, was senior-most among the rest of the other vocal artists in this video album.

=== Tours ===
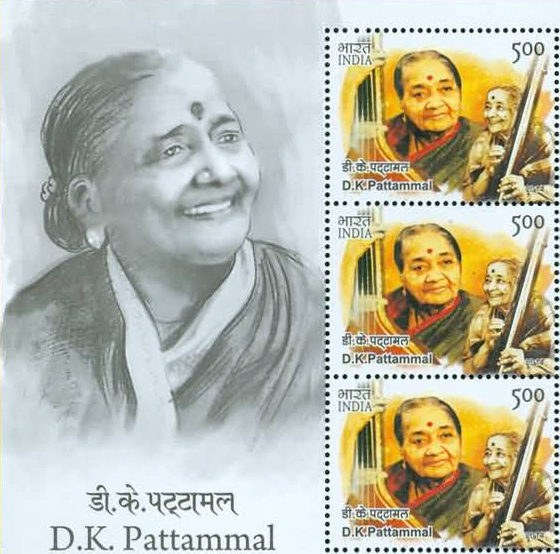
Pattammal on a 2014 stamp sheet of India

Pattammaal has performed in all major states, sabhaas and venues throughout India, as well as numerous destinations around the world, including the United States, Canada, France, Germany, Switzerland, Sri Lanka and other countries.

=== Disciples ===
Pattammal's style of singing attracted many students, foremost among them her younger brother D. K. Jayaraman, who sang with her in several concerts, and who himself received the Sangeetha Kalanidhi in 1990. A few of her other popular students include her daughter-in-law Lalitha Sivakumar, Sushila Raman, grand daughter Gayathri SundaraRaman, Geetha Rajashekar, her granddaughter Nithyasree Mahadevan, her great-granddaughter Lavanya Sundararaman, Aishwarya Srinivas and her Malaysian, Chinese student/adopted grandson Chong Chiu Sen (Sai Madhana Mohan Kumar) from Malaysia.

== Death ==
Pattammal died of natural causes in Chennai on 16 July 2009 at 1:30 pm. She was survived by her two sons I. Sivakumar and I. Lakshmankumar, as well as her grandchildren Rajguru, Gayathri, Nithyasree, and Charan. Her husband, R. Iswaran, died on 2 April 2010, aged 95.

== Awards and titles ==
D. K. Pattammal received several awards and titles throughout her career, including:

- 1961: Received Sangeet Natak Akademi Award
- 1970: Received Sangeetha Kalanidhi (Highest accolade in Carnatic music)
- 1971: Received Padma Bhushan by the Government of India
- 1978: Received Sangeetha Kalasikhamani by The Indian Fine Arts Society, Chennai.
- 1992: Elected as Fellow of Sangeet Natak Akademi
- 1993: Received title of Kalaimamani Award by the Government of Tamil Nadu, which is the highest state honour in the field of A
- 1998: Padma Vibhushan by the Government of India
- 2014: Postage stamp released by India Post

Year	Honour	Honouring bestowed or presented by	Ref
	"Gana Saraswathi" (title)	Tiger Varadachariar	
	"Sangeetha Samragni" (title)	Bharath Kalachar	
	Aparajitha Award	BHEL Ladies Welfare Society, Bhopal	
	"Isai Arasi" (title)	Madras Citizens Felicitations Committee, Writers' Circle Vidwat Sadas Scholar Assembly (Chennai)	
	"Tiruppugazh Mamani"	Vadapazhani Tiruppugazh Sabha, Chennai	
1957	President's Award	Government of India	
1960	Deva Gana Sudha Varshini	LIFCO Award, Chennai	
1961	Sangeet Natak Akademi Award	Sangeet Natak Akademi	
1970	Sangeetha Kalanidhi	Madras Music Academy	
1971	Padma Bhushan	Government of India	
1973	Isai Per Arignar	Tamil Isai Sangam	
1976	Sangeetha Kala Sagara	Visaka Music Academy, Vishakapatnam	
1978	Sangeetha Kalashikhamani	Indian Fine Arts Society, Chennai	
1991	Distinguished Service Award	Rotary Club of Madras	
1992	Gayaka Rathnam	Swati Tirunal Sangeetha Sabha, Tiruvanantapuram	
1992	Fellow of Sangeet Natak Academi	Swati Tirunal Sangeetha Sabha, Tiruvanantapuram	
1993	Kalaimamani Award	Government of Tamil Nadu	
1994		Avinashi Lingam Institute for Home Science and Higher Education for Women	
1994	Manoranjitham Award	Manoranjitham, Coimbatore	
1994	Bharathi Award	Vanavil Panpattu Mayyam	
1994	Sangeetha Rathna	T. Chowdiah Memorial National Award, Academy of Music, Bangalore	
1995	Sangeetha Rathna	Wisdom Star of India Award	
1995	Nallisai Nayaki	Tamil Nadu Nallisai Mandram	
1996	Sangeetha Kala Rathnam	Sankara Mutt, Kanchipuram	
1996	Rasika Ranjani Sabha Award	Rasika Ranjani Sabha, Mylapore, Chennai	
1997	Desiya Kuyil	Hindu Vidyalaya	
1997	Sangeetha Sarva Bhowma	Academy of Indian Music and Dance, Rajalakshmi Fine Arts, Coimbatore	
1997	Sangeetha Samrat	Bharatiya Vidhya Bhavan, Coimbatore	
1997	Raja Sir Annamalai Chettiyar Birthday Award	Raja Sir Annamalai Chettiyar Birthday Award	
1998	Kala Rathna	Rasika Ranjani Sabha, Mylapore Chennai	
1998	Stree Rathna Award	Bharatiya Vidhya Bhavan & Director K Subramaniam Memorial Trust, Chennai	
1998	Isai Narkalaignar	Sankaradas Swamy Ninaivu Mandram, Chennai	
1998	South Indian Cultural Association	South Indian Cultural Association	
1998	Kalidas Samman	Government of Madhya Pradesh	
1999	Desiya Isai Arasi	Tamil Nadu Nalvazhi Nilayam	
1999	Lion Award	Lioness Council Lion's Club International	
1999	Padma Vibhushan	Government of India	
1999	Swati Puraskar	Kerala Sangeeth Natak Academy, Government of Kerala	
2003	Gottu Vadhyam Narayana Iyengar Birth Centinary Award	Gottu Vadhyam Narayana Iyengar Birth Centinary Award	
2003	Sangeetha Sagara Rathnam	Rajalakshmi Fine Arts, Coimbatore	
2004	Probus Award of Excellence	Probus Club of Madras, Scroll of Honour International Women's Day	
2005	Sivan Isai Selvi	Papanasam Sivan Rasikar Sangam, Chennai	
2005	Life Time Achievement Award	Gayana Samaj Centenary Award, Gayana Samaj Bangalore	
2006	Sangeetha Vidyanidhi	Andhra Music Academy	
2006	Sangeetha Saraswathi Award	Guruji Viswanath, founder of Manava Seva Kendra	
2008	Layakala Nipuna	Pazhani Subramaniya Pillai Memorial Centinery Award, Percussion Arts' Centre, Bangalore	
