= List of programmes broadcast by Zee Tamil (India) =

Zee Tamil is an Indian Tamil general entertainment private broadcast television network owned by Zee Entertainment Enterprises. This is a list of original programs that have been broadcast on Zee Tamil.

== Current programming ==
=== Fiction series ===
Premiere date	Series	Ref.
5 December 2022	Karthigai Deepam	
28 August 2023	Idhayam	
9 October 2023	Sandhya Raagam	
2 June 2025	Ayali	
30 June 2025	Varisu	
21 July 2025	Chinnanchiru Kiliye	
8 September 2025	Parijatham	
3 November 2025	Thirumangalyam	
24 November 2025	Annamalai Kudumbam	
26 January 2026	Vaagai Sooda Vaa	
13 July 2026	Samanthi	

=== Dubbed series ===
Series	Premiere date	Ref.
Salangai Oli	18 August 2025	
Aval Varuvala	24 November 2025	

== Former programming ==
=== Drama series ===
Series	Premiere date	Last aired	Ref.
Amudhavum Annalakshmiyum	4 July 2022	20 January 2024	
Anbe Sivam	18 October 2021	3 July 2022	
Anna	22 May 2023	18 January 2026	
Annakodiyum Aindhu Pengalum	23 February 2015	16 December 2016	
Azhagiya Tamil Magal	28 August 2017	14 June 2019	
Chithiram Pesuthadi	19 April 2021	12 November 2022	
Darling Darling	12 December 2016	10 June 2017	
Deivam Thantha Poove	13 December 2021	26 August 2023	
Devathaiyai Kanden	9 October 2017	21 February 2020	
Endrendrum Punnagai	16 March 2020	6 May 2022	
Gettimelam	20 January 2025	28 June 2026	
Gokulathil Seethai	4 November 2019	14 May 2022	
Indira	21 November 2022	17 August 2024	
Kandukondain Kandukondain	1 April 2019	20 August 2020	
Lakshmi Vandhachu	2 February 2015	24 November 2017	
Maari	4 July 2022	1 November 2025	
Mamiyar Thevai	15 April 2013	21 February 2014	
Manasellam	20 January 2025	22 November 2025	
Meenakshi Ponnunga	1 August 2022	4 August 2024	
Mella Thirandhathu Kadhavu	2 November 2015	27 October 2017	
Mounam Pesiyadhe	4 November 2024	8 November 2025	
Mullum Malarum	27 November 2017	10 June 2019	
Nachiyarpuram	8 July 2019	14 August 2020	
Nala Damayanthi	9 October 2023	25 May 2024	
Neethane Enthan Ponvasantham	24 February 2020	25 December 2021	
Nenjathai Killadhe	1 July 2024	17 January 2025	
Ninaithale Inikkum	23 August 2021	25 October 2025	
Ninaithen Vandhai	22 January 2024	19 January 2025	
Niram Maaratha Pookal	9 October 2017	21 February 2020	
Oru Oorla Oru Rajakumari	23 April 2018	24 October 2021	
Oru Oorla Rendu Rajakumari	25 October 2021	12 November 2022	
Peranbu	13 December 2021	11 November 2023	
Poove Poochudava	24 April 2017	4 September 2021	
Priyasaki	8 June 2015	20 May 2016	
Pudhu Pudhu Arthangal	22 March 2021	20 November 2022	
Raja Magal	28 October 2019	27 November 2021	
Rajini	27 December 2021	30 April 2023	
Rekka Katti Parakkudhu Manasu	19 June 2017	24 May 2019	
Rettai Roja	12 August 2019	17 March 2023	
Sandakozhi	8 May 2023	17 August 2024	
Sathya	4 March 2019	24 October 2021	
Sathya 2	25 October 2021	9 October 2022	
Sembaruthi	16 October 2017	31 July 2022	
Seetha Raman	20 February 2023	4 May 2024	
Suryavamsam	21 September 2020	21 August 2021	
Valliyin Velan	2 September 2024	25 May 2025	
Thalayanai Pookal	23 May 2016	29 June 2018	
Thirumathi Hitler	14 December 2020	8 January 2022	
Uyirmei	18 August 2014	30 January 2015	
Veera	26 February 2024	20 September 2026	
Yaaradi Nee Mohini	24 April 2017	22 August 2021	

=== Reality and non-scripted shows ===
- Dance Jodi Dance
  - Dance Jodi Dance season 2
- Dance Jodi Dance Reloaded
  - Dance Jodi Dance Reloaded season 2
  - Dance Jodi Dance Reloaded season 3
- Dance Jodi Dance Juniors
- Dancing Khilladies
- Genes
  - Genes season 2
  - Genes season 3
- Junior Senior
- Junior Super Stars (seasons 1, 2 and 3)
- Killadi Jodis
- Mahanadigai
- Mr & Mrs Khiladis (seasons 1 and 2)
- Nanben Da
- Run Baby Run
- Sa Re Ga Ma Pa Challenge Tamil 2009
- Sa Re Ga Ma Pa Seniors
  - Sa Re Ga Ma Pa Seniors season 2
  - Sa Re Ga Ma Pa Seniors season 3
  - Sa Re Ga Ma Pa Seniors season 4
  - Sa Re Ga Ma Pa Seniors season 5
- Sa Re Ga Ma Pa Lil Champs
  - Sa Re Ga Ma Pa Tamil Li'l Champs season 2
  - Sa Re Ga Ma Pa Tamil Li'l Champs season 3
  - Sa Re Ga Ma Pa Tamil Li'l Champs season 4
  - Sa Re Ga Ma Pa Tamil Li'l Champs season 5
- Samayal Express (seasons 1 and 2)
- Simply Kushboo
- Single Pasanga
- Solvathellam Unmai (seasons 1 and 2)
- Sundays with Anil and Karky
- Super Jodi
- Super Mom (seasons 1, 2 and 3)
- Survivor
- Weekend with Stars
- Why This Kolaveri
- Zee Super Family

=== Dubbed series ===
- Chinna Poove Mella Pesu
- Chinna Marumagal
- CID
- Crime Patrol
- Fear Files
- Iniya Iru Malargal
- Jhansi Rani
- Jodha Akbar
- Kaadhalukku Salaam
- Kaatrukkenna Veli
- Mahabharatham
- Mapillai
- Marumanam
- Naagarani
- Naanum Oru Penn
- Naane Varuven
- Puratchiyalar Dr. Ambedkar
- Ramayanam
- Raman Thediya Seethai
- Sivanum Naanum
- Thamarai
- Thenali Raaman
- Veera Marthandan
- Veera Shivaji
- Vishnu Puranam
