= Sa Re Ga Ma Pa Tamil Li'l Champs season 5 =

Sa Re Ga Ma Pa Tamil Li'l Champs
- Season 5
- Saregamapa Li'l Champs Season 5
- Presented by: Archana Chandhoke
- Judges: Srinivas; Shweta Mohan; Saindhavi; S. P. Charan; Krithi Shetty (guest); Simran (guest); Vijay Antony (guest); Sai Abhyankkar (guest); Vignesh Shivan (guest); Karthik (guest); Prashanth (guest); Sandy (guest); Dushara Vijayan (guest); Sukanya (actress) (guest); Swasika (guest); Preethi Asrani (guest); Gouri G Kishan (guest); Pandiarajan (guest); Sean Roldan (guest); A. Sarkunam (guest); S. P. Sailaja (guest); Pushkar–Gayatri (guest); Vijay Prakash (guest); Aditi Balan (guest); Remya Nambessan (guest); Haricharan (guest); Gangai Amaran (guest); Snehan (guest); Rathna Kumar (guest); Vadivukkarasi (guest); Prashanthini (guest); Vivek (guest); S. Ezhil (guest); Irfan (actor) (guest); Pattimandram Raja (guest)
- Winner: Abhisheka
- Runner-up: Vishnuvardhan
- No. of episodes: 58

Release
- Original network: Zee Tamil; ZEE5
- Original release: 6 December 2025 – 7 June 2026

Season chronology
- ← Previous; Season 4 Next → Season 6

Sa Re Ga Ma Pa Tamil Li'l Champs is the 5th season of the Indian Tamil-language musical/singing reality television show Sa Re Ga Ma Pa Lil Champs. The season premiered on Zee Tamil from 6 December 2025. It features 48 young children between the ages of 5–14 years contestants progressing to the mega auditions and will select the top 24 contestants who will compete on the main show. Archana Chandhoke is returning as a host for the fourth time in a row.

Srinivas, Shweta Mohan, Saindhavi and S. P. Charan continues as judge of the fifth season. The mega auditions and introduction round saw the five judges along with special judges with well-known playback singers, such as Sai Abhyankkar, Haricharan, Gangai Amaran and Remya Nambessan. It premiered on Zee Tamil on 6 December 2025 on every Saturday and Sunday at 19:30 and is also available on the digital platform ZEE5.

The six finalists of Sa Re Ga Ma Pa Tamil Li'l Champs season 5 are Vishnuvaradhan, Akshith Nirupam, Sumanraj, Varja, Thanvi and Abishka. The Grand Finale was held on 7 June 2026 on Sunday at 1600 on Live. At the finals, Abhisheka was the title winner and Vishnuvardhan claimed the first runners-up.

== Judges ==
Judges	Description	
Shweta Mohan		Malayalam, Tamil, Telugu, Kannada and Hindi playback singer. Shweta Mohan has also judged other reality shows, including Sa Re Ga Ma Pa Seniors 5, Sa Re Ga Ma Pa Li'l Champs 4, Super Singer 6, Super Singer 7 and Super Singer 9.
Saindhavi		A Carnatic vocalist and Tamil, Telugu, Malayalam and Kannada playback singer. Saindhavi is the former wife of music composer, singer and actor G. V. Prakash Kumar.
Srinivas		He is a playback singer in Tamil, Telugu, Malayalam, Kannada and Hindi music industry. He has also judged in several other reality shows such as Seniors Season 3, Li'l Champs Season 3, Seniors Season 2, Super Singer 5, Super Singer 4, Super Singer 3, Super Singer 2 and Super Singer 1.
S. P. Charan		Telugu and Tamil playback singer as well as a host in Padutha Theeyaga. S. P. Charan is the son of legendary playback singer S. P. Balasubrahmanyam. He has also judged the popular season of Sa Re Ga Ma Pa Li'l Champs 4.
Krithi Shetty (guest)		She is an Indian actress who primarily works in Telugu and Tamil films.
Simran (guest)		An Indian actress, who predominantly works in Tamil films whilst also appearing in Telugu, Hindi, Kannada, and Malayalam films.
Vijay Antony (guest)		Indian music composer, playback singer, actor, film editor, lyricist, audio engineer, and filmmaker who working predominantly in Tamil cinema.
Vignesh Shivan (guest)		He is an Indian film director, producer, screenwriter, lyricist, and actor who works in Tamil cinema.
Swasika (guest)		She is an Indian actress and television presenter.
Dushara Vijayan (guest)		Indian actress who is known for her works in Tamil cinema.
Sukanya (guest)		An Indian actress who mainly works in Tamil and some Malayalam, Kannada, Telugu and Hindi films.
Gouri G Kishan (guest)		Indian actress who primarily works in Tamil and Malayalam films.
Aditi Balan (guest)		An Indian actress who mainly works in Tamil and Malayalam films.
Remya Nambessan (guest)		She is an Indian actress and playback singer who primarily works in Tamil and Malayalam films.
Karthik (guest)		Tamil, Telugu, Hindi and Malayalam playback singer and music composer who has won several national awards.
Prashanth (guest)		An Indian actor, businessman, playback singer, and film producer known for his works predominantly in Tamil cinema.
Sandy (guest)		He is an Indian actor and choreographer who works in Tamil and Malayalam films and television.
Pandiarajan (guest)		Indian actor, director and comedian who has played leading roles in Tamil films.
Sean Roldan (guest)		He is an Indian composer, musician, and lyricist who primarily works in the Tamil film industry.
A. Sarkunam (guest)		An Indian film director working in the Tamil cinema.
S. P. Sailaja (guest)		Indian singer, voice artist and actress who has sung in Tamil, Telugu, Kannada, Malayalam and Hindi films.
Pushkar–Gayatri (guests)		A husband-and-wife filmmaker duo from Chennai, Tamil Nadu.
Vijay Prakash (guest)		A Kannada, Tamil, Telugu, Hindi and Malayalam playback singer and music composer, from Mysore (Karnataka).
Haricharan (guest)		He is an Indian Carnatic vocalist and playback singer who primarily works in Tamil, Telugu, Malayalam, Hindi and Kannada cinema.
Snehan (guest)		Indian poet, politician, lyricist and actor who has worked in the Tamil film industry.
Sai Abhyankkar (guest)		Indian composer, playback singer and music composer who primarily works in Tamil cinema.
Preethi Asrani (guest)		She is an Indian actress who primarily appears in Telugu , Tamil films and television industry.
Gangai Amaran (guest)		A Tamil lyricist, music composer, playback singer, screenwriter and film director.
Rathna Kumar (guest)		He is an Indian film director and writer.
Vadivukkarasi (guest)		Indian actress who primarily appears in supporting roles in Tamil films.
Prashanthini (guest)		She is an Indian playback singer, singing predominantly in Tamil.
Vivek (guest)		Indian lyricist working on Tamil language films.
S. Ezhil (guest)		Indian film director who works in the Tamil film industry.
Irfan (guest)		An Indian actor who appears in Tamil serials and films.
Pattimandram Raja (guest)		He is an Indian television personality popular for his speeches in Tamil talk shows.

== Host ==
Host	Description
Archana Chandhoke	Archana is a Tamil radio personality, television presenter and actress. She has also hosted Seniors Season 5, Seniors Season 4, Seniors Season 3, Seniors Season 2, Seniors Season 1, Li'l Champs Season 4, Li'l Champs Season 3 and Mr. and Mrs. Chinnathirai Season 3. She had also participated as a housemate in Bigg Boss Season 4.

== Contestants ==
Contestants were selected by the judges during the mega auditions round.

#	Name	Hometown
1	Mahathi	Mayiladuthurai
2	Janavi	Malanpur
3	Likhith	Tiruvallur
4	Kanishk	Vandalur
5	Vishnuvaran	Kovilambakkam
6	J. Kiruthiga	Mayiladuthurai
7	Akshith Nirupam	Coimbatore
8	Sanjay	Kumbakonam
9	Shreya Sriram Iyer	Kerala
10	Mokshitha Balaji	Chennai
11	Pirathiksha	Rameswaram
12	Mithra	Kanyakumari
13	Abisheka	Mayiladuthurai
14	Sukanya Murali	Krishnagiri
15	Thanvi	Ooty
16	Varun Karthik	Coimbatore
17	Medha Meghar	Kozhikode

== Episodes ==
Epi	Air Date(s)	Round Name	Special Guest(s) & Judge(s)
1	6 December 2025	Grand Launch & Mega Auditions	Gangai Amaran & Sai Abhyankkar & Saindhavi
2	7 December 2025	Grand Launch & Mega Auditions	Gangai Amaran & Sai Abhyankkar & Saindhavi
3	13 December 2025	Mega Auditions	Gangai Amaran & Sai Abhyankkar & Saindhavi
4	14 December 2025	Mega Auditions	Gangai Amaran & Sai Abhyankkar & Saindhavi
5	20 December 2025	Introduction Round	Haricharan & Remya Nambessan
6	21 December 2025	Introduction Round	Haricharan & Remya Nambessan
7	27 December 2025	Introduction Round	Haricharan & Remya Nambessan
8	28 December 2025	Introduction Round	Haricharan & Remya Nambessan
