= Sa Re Ga Ma Pa Seniors season 5 =

Sa Re Ga Ma Pa Seniors
- Season 5
- Saregamapa Season 5

Release
- Original network: Zee Tamil; ZEE5
- Original release: 24 May – 23 November 2025
- Presented by: Archana Chandhoke
- Judges: Srinivas; Vijay Prakash; Shweta Mohan; Karthik; Saindhavi; S. P. Charan; Andrea Jeremiah (guest); Deva (guest); Vidyasagar (guest); Vishal (actor) (guest); Santhosh Narayanan (guest); Devayani (actress) (guest); Atharvaa (guest); Athulya Ravi (guest); Kavin (actor) (guest); Aditi Shankar (guest); Aarsha Chandini Baiju (guest); Ambika (guest); Darshan (guest); Harish Kalyan (guest); Ruhani Sharma (guest); Napoleon (guest); N. Lingusamy (guest); Rajakumaran (guest); Vasanth (guest); Dhibu Ninan Thomas (guest); Snehan (guest); Srikanth Deva (guest); Nivas K. Prasanna (guest); Gangai Amaran (guest); T. Rajendar (guest); Munishkanth (guest); Nakkhul (guest); Rio Raj (guest); Vijayalakshmi Ahathian (guest); Yugendran (guest); Sumathy (guest); Pa. Vijay (guest); Sirpy (guest); Rajesh Murugesan (guest); Shaalin Zoya (guest); Pushpavanam Kuppusamy (guest); Veeramanidasan (guest); RJ Vigneshkanth (guest); T. L. Maharajan (guest); OfRo (guest)
- Winner: Susanthica Jayachandran
- Runners-up: Sapesh Sapesan; Chinnu Senthamilan

Season chronology
- ← Previous; Season 4

Sa Re Ga Ma Pa seniors 5 is a 2025 Indian Tamil-language reality television singing competition show on Zee Tamil. It airs every Saturday and Sunday at 19:00 and streams on ZEE5. It premiered on 24 May 2025 as the fifth season of Sa Re Ga Ma Pa Seniors.

Archana Chandhoke is back as host for this season with the panel judges: Srinivas, Vijay Prakash, Saindhavi, Shweta Mohan, S. P. Charan and Karthik. All judges were judging this reality singing show from the previous season onwards. Srinivas, Vijay Prakash, Saindhavi and Karthik return as judge from the senior fourth season. Shweta Mohan and S. P. Charan are new judges for the senior season, after previously judging Sa Re Ga Ma Pa Tamil Li'l Champs season 4.

On 23 November 2025, the Grand Finale of the show was aired six hours, Susanthica emerged as the title winner of the inaugural edition of the Sa Re Ga Ma Pa Seniors season 5 and received a cash prize of approximately Rs 15 lakh and was awarded a dream home by MP Developers.

== Judges ==
Judges	Description
Srinivas	Playback singer in Tamil, Telugu, Malayalam, Kannada and Hindi music industry. He has also judged in several other reality shows such as Seniors Season 3, Li'l Champs Season 3, Seniors Season 2, Super Singer 5, Super Singer 4, Super Singer 3, Super Singer 2 and Super Singer 1.
Saindhavi	A Carnatic and Indian film playback singer. Saindhavi Prakash is the former wife of music composer, G. V. Prakash Kumar. She has previously also judged in Sa Re Ga Ma Pa Li'l Champs Season 3 and Sa Re Ga Ma Pa Li'l Champs 4 .
Vijay Prakash	Kannada, Tamil, Telugu, Hindi and Malayalam playback singer and music composer, from Mysore (Karnataka). He has also judged in other singing shows such as Sa Re Ga Ma Pa Championship (Kannada), Sa Re Ga Ma Pa Kannada, Padutha Theeyaga (Telugu), Seniors Season 2, Seniors Season 3 and Li'l Champs Season 3.
Shweta Mohan	Malayalam, Tamil, Telugu, Kannada and Hindi playback singer. She is the daughter of playback singer Sujatha Mohan. Shweta Mohan has also judged other reality shows, including Super Singer 6, Super Singer 7 and Super Singer 9.
S. P. Charan	He is a Telugu and Tamil playback singer as well as a host in Padutha Theeyaga. S. P. Charan is the son of legendary playback singer S. P. Balasubrahmanyam. He has also judged the popular season of Sa Re Ga Ma Pa Li'l Champs 4.
Karthik	A Tamil, Telugu, Malayalam and Hindi playback singer and music composer who has won several national awards. He has also judged other reality shows, such as Telugu Indian Idol, Sun Singer and Sa Re Ga Ma Pa Lil Champs. Karthik has been judging Sa Re Ga Ma Pa with Vijay Prakash and Srinivas since 2016.
Andrea Jeremiah (guest)	Indian actress and singer who works in Tamil and Malayalam films.
Deva (guest)	A Tamil, Kannada, Malayalam, Telugu singer and music composer. Deva came with his son, Srikanth Deva, to celebrate Deva 35 Special Round.
Vidyasagar (guest)	He is a Telugu, Tamil, Malayalam music composer and playback singer. Vidyasagar was present for his round and praised the contestants for their singing talents.
Santhosh Narayanan (guest)	Indian film composer, playback singer and music producer in Tamil, Telugu and Malayalam cinema.
Athulya Ravi (guest)	Indian actress who works in Tamil and Telugu films.
Aditi Shankar (guest)	She is a Tamil, Telugu actress and playback singer. Aditi is the daughter of film director, producer and screenwriter S. Shankar.
Aarsha Chandini Baiju (guest)	Malayalam and Tamil film actress.
Vishal (actor) (guest)	Indian actor and film producer who works in Tamil cinema.
Devayani (guest)	Indian actress who works for Tamil, Telugu and Malayalam films.
Ambika (guest)	A South Indian actress who is known for appearance across Malayalam, Tamil, Telugu and Kannada films.
Atharvaa (guest)	He is an Indian actor who works in Tamil cinema.
Kavin (guest)	An Indian actor who predominantly works in Tamil cinema.
Darshan (guest)	Indian actor who appears in Tamil cinema.
Napoleon (guest)	A Tamil actor, former politician, singer and entrepreneur.
N. Lingusamy (guest)	Indian film director, screenwriter and film producer who works in Tamil cinema.
Dhibu Ninan Thomas (guest)	Malayalam, Tamil and Telugu music composer and producer.
Snehan (guest)	Indian poet, politician, lyricist and actor who works in the Tamil industry.
Srikanth Deva (guest)	He is a Tamil, Malayalam Telugu music composer, actor and singer. Srikanth won a national-award at the 69th National Film Awards. He is also the son of music composer and singer Deva.
Nakkhul (guest)	A Tamil, Telugu, Hindi actor and playback singer. Nakkhul is the sister of actress Devayani and brother-in-law of film director Rajakumaran.
Vijayalakshmi Ahathian (guest)	An Indian actress who secured third place in Bigg Boss Season 2.
Sumathy (guest)	Indian Tamil poet, lyricist, politician, writer and orator.
Pa. Vijay (guest)	He is a Tamil lyricist, poet, writer, producer and actor.
Veeramanidasan (guest)	Indian singer and music composer of devotional and cinema songs.
Rajesh Murugesan (guest)	Tamil and Malayalam music composer known for his film compositions.
OfRo (guest)	Indian songwriter, singer and record producer.
Harish Kalyan (guest)	Indian actor who works in Tamil cinema.
Ruhani Sharma (guest)	An Indian actress and model who primarily works in Telugu films.
Rajakumaran (guest)	He is an Indian film director and actor who has made Tamil films.
Gangai Amaran (guest)	A Tamil lyricist, music composer, playback singer, screenwriter and film director. Gangai Amaran came as a guest to the show for his round celebration. He is also the brother of maestro Ilaiyaraaja.
T. Rajendar (guest)	He is a Tamil lyricist, playback singer, music composer, politician, screenwriter and film director. T. Rajendar is the father of actor Silambarasan. His appearance came during the blindfold auditions.
Nivas K. Prasanna (guest)	Tamil, Telugu singer and music composer.
Yugendran (guest)	He is a Tamil actor and playback singer. Yugendran is the son of singer Malaysia Vasudevan.
Rio Raj (guest)	Indian actor who appeared in Tamil films and television.
Vasanth (guest)	Film director who has directed many Tamil films.
Munishkanth (guest)	Indian actor and comedian who appears in Tamil films.
Sirpy (guest)	He is a Tamil film score and soundtrack composer.
Pushpavanam Kuppusamy (guest)	A Tamil folk playback singer, lyricist, music composer and writer. Pushpavanam came to celebrate Manvasanai round and praised the contestants for singing very well.
Shaalin Zoya (guest)	Indian actress, dancer and director.
RJ Vigneshkanth (guest)	Indian actor, former radio jockey and comedian.
T. L. Maharajan (guest)	Tamil classical and playback singer.

== Host ==
Host	Description
Archana Chandhoke	Archana is a Tamil radio personality, television presenter and actress. She has also hosted Seniors Season 3, Seniors Season 2, Seniors Season 1, Li'l Champs Season 3 and Mr. and Mrs. Chinnathirai Season 3. She had also participated as a housemate in Bigg Boss Season 4.

== Contestants ==
The contestants has been selected through the Mega Audition of Grand Launch with blindfold. They all selected by the main judges, Srinivas, Vijay Prakash & Shweta Mohan along with the guest judge T. Rajendar.

The List of Contestants;

#	Name
1	Arun Rajendran
2	Prathibha Selvam
3	Gowsik
4	Sapesh Sapesan
5	Ragavi
6	Arivazhagan Anpu
7	Abishek Jyothish
8	Aathira
9	Chinnu Senthamilan
10	Shivani Naveen
11	Pirashan Pirathas
12	Tharangini Balamurugan
13	Iniya Rajakumaran
14	Harish Ragav
15	Pavithra Sugunesh
16	Silambarasan
17	Sneha
18	Sulakshana S
19	Vijayalakshmi
20	Susanthica Jayachandran
21	Sreehari Raveendran
22	Arun CJ
23	Bagavathi
24	Agreena G Krishna
25	Shruthi Sundar
