= Sa Re Ga Ma Pa Tamil Li'l Champs season 3 =

Sa Re Ga Ma Pa Tamil Li'l Champs
- Season 3
- Title Winner - Kilmisha
- Presented by: Archana Chandhoke
- Judges: Srinivas; Abhirami; Vijay Prakash; Saindhavi Prakash
- Winner: Kilmisha
- Runner-up: Ruthresh Kumar

Release
- Original network: Zee Tamil
- Original release: 1 July 2023

Season chronology
- Next → Season 4

The third season of the Indian Tamil-language child singing reality show Sa Re Ga Ma Pa Lil Champs is based on India's longest-running reality show Sa Re Ga Ma Pa. and was launched by Zee Tamil on 1 July 2023.

Abhirami is the third new judge who has joined Sa Re Ga Ma Pa L'il Champs in the judging panel. Saindhavi Prakash is known to be the fourth new judge who has joined Sa Re Ga Ma Pa L'il Champs alongside the judging panel. Archana Chandhoke has returned for the sixth time, including Sa Re Ga Ma Pa Seniors and Sa Re Ga Ma Pa Lil Champs, as host for the third season of Sa Re Ga Ma Pa L'il Champs. This show has been known to introduce and unlock the hidden talents of the juniors from all diverse backgrounds, including children who are categorised under special needs. The four main judges of the show are Srinivas, Vijay Prakash, Saindhavi Prakash and Abhirami.

The Grand Finale was held on 17 December 2023. At the finals, Kilmisha was the title winner and Ruthresh Kumar claimed the first runners-up. Kilmisha is the first Girl to become the title winner of Sa Re Ga Ma Pa Lil Champs from Sri Lanka.

== Auditions ==
The channel started taking auditions for this season through online audition registration. Then the offline auditions placed in Tamil Nadu, Kerala, Telangana, Andhra Pradesh and Karnataka as well as from international waters (such as Sri Lanka), the jury and judges picked out the top 45 talented singers and they will battle it out to grab a position in the final 30. The youngest contestant who successfully completed the auditions is 6 years old and the oldest contestant is 14 years old. The jury members include the professional playback singers and several other musicians. Several contestants from Sa Re Ga Ma Pa Seniors (season 3) have been chosen to occupy as vocal trainers to the exceptional contestants.

The show premiered on Saturday and Sunday at 19:00 from 1 July 2023 on Zee Tamil and worldwide on Zee5.

From the introductory rounds onwards, golden performance showers have been awarded to the contestants who have performed exceptionally well and have got a 100% mark according to the judges . If the judges decide that the contestant deserves a golden shower, then they would sing, as traditionally in Sa Re Ga Ma Pa Lil Champs and Sa Re Ga Ma Pa Seniors, "Kannamaniye <Name> Kalakipotta Nee / Sokkavaikkum Paatai Paadi Asathipotta Nee / Aatam Poordu (double clap) / Vetta Poordu (double clap) / Aatam Poordu Vetta Poordu Santhoshame Sa Re Ga Ma Pa / Ithu Golden performance ".

== Contestants ==
Contestants were selected by the judges during the mega auditions round.

Name	Gender
Karunya	Female
Dhakshitha Sree	Female
Sathvik	Male
Kanishkha	Female
Fidha Naaz	Female
Nandha	Male
Nishanth Kavin	Male
Kavina	Female
Avanthika	Female
Sanjana	Female
Mirthika Sree	Female
Kanishkar	Male
Kilmisha	Female.
Rikshitha Jawahar	Female
Ruthresh Kumar	Male
Karthika Sree	Female
Dharshan	Male
Sabareeshwaran	Male
Aksatha	Female
Mahitha	Female
Raghav Prasad	Male
Kavinaya	Female
Shanmitha	Female
Aadhira	Female
Janav	Male
Siddharth	Male
Swetha Sree	Female
Praveen	Male
Priyan	Male
Ashaani	Female

Top 6 Finalists

- Rikshitha Jawahar
- Kilmisha
- Sanjana
- Ruthresh Kumar
- Kanishkar
- Nishanth Kavin

== Episodes ==
Every Saturday and Sunday, episodes of Sa Re Ga Ma Pa L'il Champs Season 3 are telecasted by Zee Tamil. The weekly episode numbers, date, names of the rounds and the special guests, judges that were invited to Sa Re Ga Ma Pa L'il Champs Season 3 are shown here. In addition, after every weekly episodes, several awards that are funded by the sponsors would be given to the contestants, for example, exceptional singer of the week, best performance of the week, strongest performer of the week, favourite performer of the week, super performer(s) of the week, little master of the week and stylish performer of the week. Grand Finale would take place as a live event, and that would be the second final episode of the season, before the celebrations. The best performers and entertainers of the week, who would be awarded by Zee Tamil, are also included below.

Episode number	Air date(s)	Round name	Best performers (weekly)	Special guest(s) and judge(s)
1	1 July 2023	Grand launch and mega auditions	Rikshitha Jawahar	Mano (judge); Vaikom Vijayalakshmi (judge)
2	2 July 2023	Grand launch and mega auditions	Rikshitha Jawahar	Mano (judge); Vaikom Vijayalakshmi (judge)
3	8 July 2023	Introduction round		Vaikom Vijayalakshmi (judge)
4	9 July 2023	Introduction round		Vaikom Vijayalakshmi (judge)
5	15 July 2023	Introduction round		Saindhavi Prakash (judge)
6	16 July 2023	Introduction round		Saindhavi Prakash (judge)
7	22 July 2023	Mannvaasanai round	1) Exceptional singer of the week – Fidha Naaz 2) Best performer of the week – Sathvik 3) Strongest performer of the week – Nishanth Kavin 4) Favourite performer of the week – Kavina 5) Super performer of the week – Kanishkar 6) Super performer of the week – Kilmisha	Seeman; Karthik (singer)
8	23 July 2023	Mannvaasanai round	1) Exceptional singer of the week – Fidha Naaz 2) Best performer of the week – Sathvik 3) Strongest performer of the week – Nishanth Kavin 4) Favourite performer of the week – Kavina 5) Super performer of the week – Kanishkar 6) Super performer of the week – Kilmisha	Pushpavanam Kuppusamy (singer); Karthik (singer)
9	29 July 2023	Seniors vs Juniors round	1) Exceptional singer of the week – Dharshan 2) Best performer of the week – Rikshitha Jawahar 3) Strongest performer of the week – Praveen 4) Little master of the week – Kavina 5) Super performer of the week – Nishanth Kavin 6) Stylish performer of the week – Swetha Sree	Haricharan (judge); Sa Re Ga Ma Pa Seniors Season 3 Contestants
10	30 July 2023	Seniors vs Juniors round	1) Exceptional singer of the week – Dharshan 2) Best performer of the week – Rikshitha Jawahar 3) Strongest performer of the week – Praveen 4) Little master of the week – Kavina 5) Super performer of the week – Nishanth Kavin 6) Stylish performer of the week – Swetha Sree	Haricharan (judge); Sa Re Ga Ma Pa Seniors Season 3 Contestants
11	5 August 2023	Seniors vs Juniors round	1) Exceptional singer of the week – Nandha 2) Best performance of the week – Ruthresh Kumar 3) Strongest performer of the week – Kanishkar 4) Little master of the week – Sathvik 5) Stylish performer of the week – Mirthika Sree 6) Super performer of the week – Karunya	Haricharan (judge); Sa Re Ga Ma Pa Seniors Season 3 Contestants
12	6 August 2023	Seniors vs Juniors round	1) Exceptional singer of the week – Nandha 2) Best performance of the week – Ruthresh Kumar 3) Strongest performer of the week – Kanishkar 4) Little master of the week – Sathvik 5) Stylish performer of the week – Mirthika Sree 6) Super performer of the week – Karunya	Haricharan (judge); Sa Re Ga Ma Pa Seniors Season 3 Contestants
13	12 August 2023	Devotional round	1) Exceptional singer of the week – 2) Best performer of the week – 3) Strongest performer of the week – 4) Favourite performer of the week – 5) Super performer of the week – 6) Stylish performer of the week –	Sirkazhi G. Sivachidambaram (singer); Mano (judge)
14	13 August 2023	Devotional round	1) Exceptional singer of the week – 2) Best performer of the week – 3) Strongest performer of the week – 4) Favourite performer of the week – 5) Super performer of the week – 6) Stylish performer of the week –	Sirkazhi G. Sivachidambaram (singer); Mano (judge)
15	19 August 2023	Devotional round	1) Exceptional singer of the week – 2) Best performer of the week – 3) Strongest performer of the week – 4) Favourite performer of the week – 5) Super performer of the week – 6) Stylish performer of the week –	Sirkazhi G. Sivachidambaram (singer); Mano (judge)
16	20 August 2023	Dedication round	1) Best performer of the week – Rikshitha Jawahar 2) Strongest performer of the week – Kilmisha 3) Favourite performer of the week – Sanjana 4) Super performer of the week – Ruthresh Kumar 5) Stylish performer of the week – Kanishkar	Snehan (lyricist)
17	26 August 2023	Dedication round	1) Best performer of the week – Rikshitha Jawahar 2) Strongest performer of the week – Kilmisha 3) Favourite performer of the week – Sanjana 4) Super performer of the week – Ruthresh Kumar 5) Stylish performer of the week – Kanishkar	Snehan (lyricist)
18	27 August 2023	Dedication round	1) Best performer of the week – Rikshitha Jawahar 2) Strongest performer of the week – Kilmisha 3) Favourite performer of the week – Sanjana 4) Super performer of the week – Ruthresh Kumar 5) Stylish performer of the week – Kanishkar	Snehan (lyricist)
19	2 September 2023	Evergreen hits round		
20	3 September 2023	Evergreen hits round		
21	9 September 2023	Deva round		Deva (composer) Srikanth Deva (composer)
22	10 September 2023	Deva round		Deva (composer) Srikanth Deva (composer)
23	16 September 2023	Drama and performance round	1) Best performance of the week – Nishanth Kavin 2) Strongest performer of the week – Sanjana and Kanishkar 3) Favourite performer of the week – Kilmisha and Fidha 4) Super performer of the week – Ruthresh Kumar and Rikshitha Jawahar 5) Stylish performer of the week – Praveen and Raghav Prasad 6) Little master of the week - Sathvik, Kavina and Dhakshitha Sree	Samuthirakani (actor/director); Robo Shankar (actor); Lakshmy Ramakrishnan (actress)
24	17 September 2023	Drama and performance round	1) Best performance of the week – Nishanth Kavin 2) Strongest performer of the week – Sanjana and Kanishkar 3) Favourite performer of the week – Kilmisha and Fidha 4) Super performer of the week – Ruthresh Kumar and Rikshitha Jawahar 5) Stylish performer of the week – Praveen and Raghav Prasad 6) Little master of the week - Sathvik, Kavina and Dhakshitha Sree	Samuthirakani (actor/director); Robo Shankar (actor); Lakshmy Ramakrishnan (actress)
25	23 September 2023	Thala Thalapathy round	1) Best performance of the week – Rikshitha Jawahar and Fidha 2) Strongest performer of the week – Sanjana 3) Favourite performer of the week – Kilmisha 4) Super performer of the week – Kanishkha 5) Stylish performer of the week – Kanishkar 6) Little master of the week - Sathvik	Laila (actress); Sanghavi (actress); Karthik (singer)
26	24 September 2023	Thala Thalapathy round	1) Best performance of the week – Rikshitha Jawahar and Fidha 2) Strongest performer of the week – Sanjana 3) Favourite performer of the week – Kilmisha 4) Super performer of the week – Kanishkha 5) Stylish performer of the week – Kanishkar 6) Little master of the week - Sathvik	Laila (actress); Sanghavi (actress); Karthik (singer)
27	30 September 2023	One on one round	1) Best performance of the week – Rikshitha Jawahar and Sanjana 2) Strongest performer of the week – Nishanth Kavin 3) Favourite performer of the week – Ruthresh Kumar 4) Super performer of the Week – Ashaani 5) Stylish performer of the week – Kilmisha 6) Little master of the week - Kavina	Jayam Ravi (actor); Vaikom Vijayalakshmi (judge)
28	1 October 2023	One on one round	1) Best performance of the week – Rikshitha Jawahar and Sanjana 2) Strongest performer of the week – Nishanth Kavin 3) Favourite performer of the week – Ruthresh Kumar 4) Super performer of the Week – Ashaani 5) Stylish performer of the week – Kilmisha 6) Little master of the week - Kavina	Vaikom Vijayalakshmi (judge)
29	7 October 2023	நிலா பாடல்கள் சுற்று	1) Best performance of the week – Kilmisha 2) Strongest performer of the week – Ruthresh Kumar 3) Favourite performer of the week – Raghav Prasad 4) Super performer of the week – Dharshan and Fidha 5) Stylish performer of the week – Praveen 6) Little master of the week - Sanjana	Rajhesh Vaidhya (veena artist); Praniti (singer); Sneha (actress); Arun Vaidyanathan (director)
30	8 October 2023	நிலா பாடல்கள் சுற்று	1) Best performance of the week – Kilmisha 2) Strongest performer of the week – Ruthresh Kumar 3) Favourite performer of the week – Raghav Prasad 4) Super performer of the week – Dharshan and Fidha 5) Stylish performer of the week – Praveen 6) Little master of the week - Sanjana	Rajhesh Vaidhya (veena artist); Praniti (singer); Sneha (actress); Arun Vaidyanathan (director)
31	14 October 2023	Town bus round	1) Best performance of the week – Kilmisha 2) Strongest performer of the week – Sanjana 3) Favourite performer of the week – Nishanth Kavin 4) Super performer of the week – Praveen 5) Stylish performer of the week – Sathvik 6) Little master of the week - Dhakshitha Sree	Karu Palaniappan (director) Deepa Shankar (actress)
32	15 October 2023	Town bus round	1) Best performance of the week – Kilmisha 2) Strongest performer of the week – Sanjana 3) Favourite performer of the week – Nishanth Kavin 4) Super performer of the week – Praveen 5) Stylish performer of the week – Sathvik 6) Little master of the week - Dhakshitha Sree	Karu Palaniappan (director) Deepa Shankar (actress)
33	21 October 2023	உள்ளம் கேட்குமே சுற்று	1) Best performance of the week – Fidha 2) Strongest performer of the week – Nishanth Kavin 3) Favourite performer of the week – Kanishkar 4) Super performer of the week – Ruthresh Kumar 5) Stylish performer of the week – Sathvik and Dhakshitha Sree 6) Little master of the week - Praveen	Mano (judge); Haricharan (judge)
34	22 October 2023	உள்ளம் கேட்குமே சுற்று	1) Best performance of the week – Fidha 2) Strongest performer of the week – Nishanth Kavin 3) Favourite performer of the week – Kanishkar 4) Super performer of the week – Ruthresh Kumar 5) Stylish performer of the week – Sathvik and Dhakshitha Sree 6) Little master of the week - Praveen	Mano (judge); Haricharan (judge)
35	28 October 2023	Retro hit round	1) Best performance of the week – Kanishkar 2) Strongest performer of the week – Sanjana 3) Favourite performer of the week – Priyan 4) Super performer of the week – Fidha 5) Stylish performer of the week – Ruthresh Kumar 6) Little master of the week - Sathvik	Santhosh Narayanan (composer); Mano (judge); Raghava Lawrence (actor)
36	29 October 2023	Retro hit round	1) Best performance of the week – Kanishkar 2) Strongest performer of the week – Sanjana 3) Favourite performer of the week – Priyan 4) Super performer of the week – Fidha 5) Stylish performer of the week – Ruthresh Kumar 6) Little master of the week - Sathvik	Santhosh Narayanan (composer); Mano (judge); Raghava Lawrence (actor)
37	4 November 2023	Trio challenge round	1) Best Performance of the week – Rikshitha Jawahar 2) Strongest Performer of the week – Ruthresh Kumar 3) Favourite Performer of the week – Nishanth Kavin and Kanishka 4) Super Performer of the week – Fidha Naaz 5) Stylish Performer of the week – Kilmisha 6) Little Master of the week - Sanjana	Mano (judge) Vadivel Suresh (Sri Lankan politician)
38	5 November 2023	Trio challenge round	1) Best Performance of the week – Rikshitha Jawahar 2) Strongest Performer of the week – Ruthresh Kumar 3) Favourite Performer of the week – Nishanth Kavin and Kanishka 4) Super Performer of the week – Fidha Naaz 5) Stylish Performer of the week – Kilmisha 6) Little Master of the week - Sanjana	Mano (judge) Vadivel Suresh (Sri Lankan politician)
39	11 November 2023	Family and friends round	1) Best performer of the week – Shamala Devi, Ashaani and Boomika 2) Strongest performer of the week – Manikandan, Ruthresh Kumar and Dinesh Paandi 3) Favourite performer of the week – Naga Arjun, Kilmisha, Raagawarshini and Praveen 4) Super performer of the week – Bavathayini, Kanishka and Karthika Shree 5) Stylish performer of the week – Sharath Mathew, Kanishkar and Guruprasath	
40	12 November 2023	Boys vs girls	1) Best performer of the week – Shamala Devi, Ashaani and Boomika 2) Strongest performer of the week – Manikandan, Ruthresh Kumar and Dinesh Paandi 3) Favourite performer of the week – Naga Arjun, Kilmisha, Raagawarshini and Praveen 4) Super performer of the week – Bavathayini, Kanishka and Karthika Shree 5) Stylish performer of the week – Sharath Mathew, Kanishkar and Guruprasath	Sa Re Ga Ma Pa Seniors Season 3 Contestants
41	18 November 2023	Old is gold round	First finalist - Rikshitha Jawahar 1) Best performance of the week – Rikshitha Jawahar 2) Strongest performer of the week – Nishanth Kavin 3) Little master of the week - Sanjana 4) Stylish performer of the week – Kanishkar 5) Super performer of the week – Kanishka 6) Favourite performer of the week – 7) Versatile singer of the week- Ruthresh Kumar	
42	19 November 2023	Old is gold round	First finalist - Rikshitha Jawahar 1) Best performance of the week – Rikshitha Jawahar 2) Strongest performer of the week – Nishanth Kavin 3) Little master of the week - Sanjana 4) Stylish performer of the week – Kanishkar 5) Super performer of the week – Kanishka 6) Favourite performer of the week – 7) Versatile singer of the week- Ruthresh Kumar	
43	25 November 2023	AR Rahman hits round	Second finalist - Kilmisha 1) Best performance of the week – Rikshitha Jawahar 2) Strongest performer of the week – Ruthresh Kumar 3) Favourite performer of the week – Fidha 4) Super performer of the week – Sanjana 5) Stylish performer of the week – Kanishkar 6) Little master of the week - Dhakshitha Sree 7) Versatile singer of the week- Kilmisha	Sam C. S. (composer) Shakthisree Gopalan (singer); Harish Kalyan (actor); Rio Raj (actor); Kathir (director); Haricharan (judge)
44	26 November 2023	AR Rahman hits round	Second finalist - Kilmisha 1) Best performance of the week – Rikshitha Jawahar 2) Strongest performer of the week – Ruthresh Kumar 3) Favourite performer of the week – Fidha 4) Super performer of the week – Sanjana 5) Stylish performer of the week – Kanishkar 6) Little master of the week - Dhakshitha Sree 7) Versatile singer of the week- Kilmisha	Sam C. S. (composer) Shakthisree Gopalan (singer); Harish Kalyan (actor); Rio Raj (actor); Kathir (director); Haricharan (judge)
45	2 December 2023	காதலும் இசையும் சுற்று	Third finalist - Sanjana Fourth finalist - Ruthresh Kumar 1) Best performance of the week – Ruthresh Kumar 2) Strongest performer of the week – Sanjana 3) Little master of the week - Sathvik 4) Stylish performer of the week – Kanishkar 5) Super performer of the week – Nishanth Kavin and Kanishka 6) Favourite performer of the week – Priyan 7) Versatile singer of the week- Rikshitha Jawahar and Kilmisha	Sathyaraj (actor)
46	3 December 2023	காதலும் இசையும் சுற்று	Third finalist - Sanjana Fourth finalist - Ruthresh Kumar 1) Best performance of the week – Ruthresh Kumar 2) Strongest performer of the week – Sanjana 3) Little master of the week - Sathvik 4) Stylish performer of the week – Kanishkar 5) Super performer of the week – Nishanth Kavin and Kanishka 6) Favourite performer of the week – Priyan 7) Versatile singer of the week- Rikshitha Jawahar and Kilmisha	Sathyaraj (actor)
47	9 December 2023	Final battle	Fifth finalist - Kanishkar Sixth finalist - Nishanth Kavin 1) Best performance of the week – Kanishkar 2) Strongest performer of the week – Nishanth Kavin 3) Little master of the week - Sathvik and Dakshitha Shree 4) Stylish performer of the week – Rikshitha Jawahar and Sanjana 5) Super performer of the week – Ruthresh Kumar and Kilmisha 6) Favourite performer of the week – Fidha Naaz and Ashaani	P. Unnikrishnan (singer)
48	10 December 2023	Final battle	Fifth finalist - Kanishkar Sixth finalist - Nishanth Kavin 1) Best performance of the week – Kanishkar 2) Strongest performer of the week – Nishanth Kavin 3) Little master of the week - Sathvik and Dakshitha Shree 4) Stylish performer of the week – Rikshitha Jawahar and Sanjana 5) Super performer of the week – Ruthresh Kumar and Kilmisha 6) Favourite performer of the week – Fidha Naaz and Ashaani	P. Unnikrishnan (singer)
49	16 December 2023	Final celebration		Naresh Iyer (singer) Vijay Yesudas (singer/actor) Uthara Unnikrishnan (singer) Sunitha Sarathy (singer)
	17 December 2023	Grand Finale - live	Winner - Kilmisha First runner up - Ruthresh Kumar Second runner up - Sanjana Third runner up - Rikshitha Jawahar	Yuvan Shankar Raja (composer) Karthik (singer) Unni Menon (singer) T. L. Maharajan (singer) Chinnaponnu (singer) Sharanya Srinivas (singer)

== Competition table ==
The weekly Sa Re Ga Ma Pa L'il Champs Season 3 competition outlines the names of all the contestants, including the name of the weekly round, with all elimination status. It would be very evident to compare whether the young kids have showcase their hidden talents and summarise whether they were able to score a golden or diamond performance tag. The competitive rounds and the process of elimination commenced during the Mannvaasanai Round.

	Mega auditions	Introduction round	Mannvaasanai round	Seniors vs Juniors round	Devotional round	
Golden performer(s)	Rikshitha	Karunya; Kilmisha; Kanishkar; Raghav; Fidha; Praveen; Ruthresh Nandha	Sathvik Fidha Dhakshitha Kanishkar Nandha Rikshitha Praveen Kavina	Fidha Rikshitha Dharshan Nishanth Kavina Nishanth Praveen Kanishkar Dhakshitha Sathvik Karunya Mirthika Ruthresh		
Avanthika	Selected	Safe	Safe			
Dhakshitha	Selected	Safe	Golden Performer; Safe			
Dharshan	Selected	Safe	Safe	Golden Performer; Safe		
Fidha	Selected	Golden Performer; Safe	Golden Performer; Safe	Golden Performer; Safe		
Kanishkha	Selected	Safe	Safe			
Karunya	Selected	Golden Performer; Safe	Safe			
Kilmisha	Selected	Golden Performer; Safe	Golden Performer Safe	Safe		
Ashaani						
Kanishkar	Selected	Golden Performer; Safe	Golden Performer; Safe			
Karthika	Selected	Safe	Safe			
Kavina	Selected	Safe	Golden Performer; Safe	Golden Performer; Safe		
Mirthika	Selected	Safe	Safe			
Sathvik	Selected	Safe	Golden Performer; Safe			
Nandha	Selected	Golden Performer; Safe	Golden Performer; Safe			
Nishanth	Selected	Safe	Golden Performer; Safe	Golden Performer; Safe		
Praveen	Selected	Golden Performer; Safe	Golden Performer; Safe	Golden Performer; Safe		
Priyan	Selected	Safe	Safe			
Ruthresh	Selected	Golden Performer safe	Safe	Golden Performer; Safe		
Rikshitha	Selected; Golden Performer	Safe	Golden Performer; Safe	Golden Performer; Safe		
Raghav	Selected	Golden Performer; Safe	Safe			
Sanjana	Selected	Safe	Safe			
Swetha	Selected	Safe	Safe	Safe		
Mahitha	Selected	Safe	Safe	Eliminated		
Siddharth	Selected	Safe	Safe	Eliminated		
Kavinaya	Selected	Safe	Safe	Eliminated		
Shanmitha	Selected	Safe	Eliminated			
Sabareeshwaran	Selected	Safe	Eliminated			
Janav	Selected	Safe	Eliminated			
Aksatha	Selected	Safe	Eliminated			
Aadhira	Selected	Safe	Eliminated			
Notes	1	2	3	4		v
Eliminated	None	None	Shanmitha	Mahitha		
Eliminated	None	None	Aksatha	Mahitha		
Eliminated	None	None	Aadhira	Siddharth		
Eliminated	None	None	Janav	Siddharth		
Eliminated	None	None	Sabareeshwaran	Kavinaya		

Color Keys

Indicates the contestant is given Golden Performer and received a golden shower on stage.
Indicates the contestant is safe from elimination.
Indicates the contestant is "Selected" to compete in the main competition after being selected in the Mega Auditions.
Indicates the title winner.
Indicates the first runner up.
Indicates the second runner up.
Indicates the third runner up.
Indicates the fourth runner up.
Indicates that the contestant is facing public vote and being nominated for elimination for insufficient performance.
Indicates that the contestant was eliminated.
Indicates that the contestant did not perform in the round or was absent in the round.

Competition notes

- ^1: Rikshitha Jawahar was the only golden performer of the week during the "Mega Audition" round.
- ^2: Introduction round is a non-competitive round, although golden performances were just awarded as a causal tradition of Sa Re Ga Ma Pa.
- ^3: The first set of elimination that has taken place in Sa Re Ga Ma Pa L'il Champs Season 3 because of insufficient performance are to the following contestants: Shanmitha, Aksatha, Aadihira, Janav and Sabareeshwaran. These contestants would return to the wildcard round.
- ^4: A new contestant Aashani, who delayed her return from Sri Lanka had been brought to audition during the episode, from the permission with the judges. After her performance, the judges decided that she could perform for at least 2 weeks.
