= Padayappa (soundtrack) =

- Album cover

Soundtrack album by A. R. Rahman
- Released: 2 April 1999
- Recorded: Panchathan Record Inn
- Genre: Feature film soundtrack
- Length: 30:22
- Labels: Star Music; Pyramid; Aditya Music
- Producer: A. R. Rahman

A. R. Rahman chronology
En Swasa Kaatre (1999)	Padayappa (1999)	Kadhalar Dhinam (1999)

Padayappa is the soundtrack album of the 1999 Indian Tamil drama film of the same name written and directed by K. S. Ravikumar. The film's original soundtrack and score were composed by A. R. Rahman, with lyrics written by Vairamuthu and was released through the audio label Star Music. The soundtrack of the Telugu dubbed version titled Narasimha was released through Saregama.

== Development ==
Before the film's release, Rahman had asked Ravikumar whether the soundtrack could be released in August 1999. Ravikumar informed Rahman that he had spoken to the press about the completion of the film's making, and that Rahman would be blamed if the film had a delayed release. As a result, Rahman did a live re-recording of both the soundtrack and score to finish them on time.

The credits for the song "Vetri Kodi Kattu", which was sung by Palakkad Sreeram, initially went to Malaysia Vasudevan, who publicly stated that the credits for the song were attributed to Sreeram and not to him. Rahman requested the company who manufactured the audio cassettes to make the change. "Minsara Poove" had two versions with Hariharan rendering his vocals while the version of Srinivas was initially recorded as "track version". Rajini and Ravikumar preferred Srinivas's version "as it was more majestic". The song "Minsara Kanna" is based on the Vasantha raga, while "Vetri Kodi Kattu" is based on the Keeravani raga.

== Reception ==
Singer Charulatha Mani, in her column for The Hindu, "A Raga's journey", called "Minsara Kanna" "a mind-blowing piece" G. Dhananjayan, in his book Best of Tamil Cinema, says the songs are "mass entertaining", also citing that the songs contributed to the film's success. Srikanth Srinivasa of the Deccan Herald wrote, "The music by Rahman, to Vairamuthu’s lyrics, sounds good while the movie is on, though whether without the presence of Rajanikanth they would have, is another thing.[sic]" S. Shiva Kumar of The Times of India was more critical of the soundtrack, and called it "lacklustre". Vijandran Ramasamy of Indolink felt Padaiyappa album lacked "a central love song/theme" felt the song "Kicku" was a misfire in the album and called "Suthi Suthi" as his personal favourite and Lighter Sense from the same website wrote "Well, one more from ARR, definitely not one of his best".

== Track list ==
=== Tamil ===
All lyrics are written by Vairamuthu.

Padayappa
No.	Title	Singer(s)	Length
1.	"En Peru Padayappa"	S. P. Balasubrahmanyam	5:25
2.	"Minsara Kanna"	Srinivas, Hariharan, Nithyasree Mahadevan, Palakkad Sreeram	6:19
3.	"Suthi Suthi"	S. P. Balasubrahmanyam, Harini, Savitha Reddy	6:27
4.	"Vetri Kodi Kattu"	Palakkad Sreeram	4:41
5.	"Kikku Yerudhey"	Mano, Febi Mani, Ganga	5:28
6.	"Padayappa Theme Music" (Instrumental)	-	2:02
Total length:			30:22

=== Telugu ===
All lyrics are written by AM Rathnam, Shiva Ganesh.

Narasimha
No.	Title	Singer(s)	Length
1.	"Naa Peru Narasimha"	S. P. Balasubrahmanyam	5:25
2.	"Meriseti Poova"	Srinivas, Hariharan, Nithyasree Mahadevan, Palakkad Sreeram	6:19
3.	"Chuttu Chutti"	S. P. Balasubrahmanyam, Harini, Savitha Reddy	6:27
4.	"Yekku Tholimettu"	Palakkad Sreeram	4:41
5.	"Kikku Yekkele"	Mano, Febi Mani	5:28
6.	"Narasimha Theme Music"	Instrumental	2:02
Total length:			30:22

== Album credits ==
- Harmony : Ganga, Kanchana, Febi, Feji, Chandran, Srinivas, Noell
- Hindustani Aalaap : Hariharan
- Additional programming : H. Sridhar
- Orchestra conducted by : Srinivasamoorthy
- Mridangam : D. A. Srinivas
- Nadaswaram : Vasu
- Clarinet : M. S. V. Raja
- Flute : Naveen
- Guitar : Kabuli, Rupert
- Ghatam : T. H. V. Umashankar
- Trumpets : Eugene, Roy, Thomas, Babu
- Darbuka percussion : Jaikumar

== Bibliography ==
- Dhananjayan, G. (2011). "Padayappa". The Best of Tamil Cinema, 1931 to 2010: 1977–2010. Galatta Media. ISBN 978-81-921043-0-0.
- Mathai, Kamini (2009). A. R. Rahman: The Musical Storm. Penguin Books. ISBN 978-0670083718.
