= Sa Re Ga Ma Pa Seniors season 3 =

Sa Re Ga Ma Pa Seniors
- Season 3
- Presented by: Archana Chandhoke
- Judges: Srinivas; Karthik; Vijay Prakash; Remya Nambeesan
- Winner: Purushothaman
- No. of episodes: 55

Release
- Original network: Zee Tamil
- Original release: 18 December 2022 – 25 June 2023

Season chronology
- ← Previous; Season 2 Next → Season 4

The third season of the Indian Tamil-language reality singing television series Sa Re Ga Ma Pa Seniors premiered on Zee Tamil on 18 December 2022. The four main judges of this show are Srinivas, Karthik, Vijay Prakash and Remya Nambeesan. Remya Nambeesan is the fourth new judge who has joined Sa Re Ga Ma Pa from season 3.Archana Chandhoke has returned as the host for the third time. This show has been a fame to have many talented contestants from many diverse backgrounds including those with disability (including visual impairment, albinism in humans).

== Summary ==
The show started with 23 contestants after the mega-blind audition round. There will be several rounds of performances to shortlist the top contestants for the finale. On each round of the show, four judges and jury members from various musical backgrounds weigh in with their points to judge every performance. The four judges rate the performances on a scale of 10 and the jury members on a scale of 5. The performance is recognized as golden if all the judges decide to rate a contestant's effort with 10 points. For a golden performance, the judges sing "Kannamaniye <name> Kalakipotta Nee / Sokkavaikkum Paatai Paadi Asathipotta Nee / Aatam Poordu (double clap) / Vetta Poordu (double clap) / Aatam Poordu Vetta Poordu Santhoshame Sa Re Ga Ma Pa / Ithu Golden Performance" and the contestant would receive a golden shower on the stage. For the first time, contestants Akshaya and Sharath were given a diamond performance during the "Kaadhale Kaadhali" (love songs) round for their rendition of "Vaaji Vaaji" song from the film Sivaji: The Boss.

If a contestant does not achieve 10/10, the total points are computed by accumulating the scores from the jury members and the judges. Each juror's score must be a whole number, and the judges' score can be in increments of 0.5. Srinivas' score would be a "secret" score, meaning that this score would not be revealed (unless the performance was a golden performance). It would still be counted when adding up the total score. At the end of every week, awards would be given to several performances, such as the week's best performance. Moreover, participants who received the lowest scores will move into the danger zone and, depending on their marks, will either be saved or eliminated. The first set of elimination led to three participants leaving the competition. From round 12, it was announced that there would be no elimination and there would only be selection to the top five finalists.

== Auditions ==
The channel started taking auditions for this season through online audition registration. Then the offline auditions started on 18 September 2022 and placed in Tamil Nadu, Telangana, Andhra Pradesh, Kerala and Karnataka as well as from international waters ( such as United Kingdom and Sri Lanka). During the season auditions and the competitive rounds, special guests, from film directors, music directors, singers and actors/actresses, such as Gangai Amaran, G. V. Prakash Kumar, D. Imman, Yuvan Shankar Raja, Sean Roldan, Hiphop Tamizha(Adhi Ramachandran ), P. Susheela, Hariharan (singer), Shreya Ghoshal, Mano (singer), Sujatha Mohan, L. R. Eswari, Nithyasree Mahadevan, Vaikom Vijayalakshmi, Saindhavi Prakash, T. L. Maharajan, Malgudi Subha, Rajhesh Vaidhya, Kalpana Raghavendar, Krish (singer), Mahathi, Mysskin, T. Rajendar, Santhanam (actor), Arya (actor), Soori (actor), Sneha (actress), Abhirami (actress), Anandhi, Shanthanu Bhagyaraj, Kavin (actor), Kanmani Manoharan, Manju Warrier, Ashwin Kumar Lakshmikanthan, Ramya Pandian, Karthik Raj, Chinnaponnu, Baba Bhaskar, Yugendran, Stephen Devassy have praised the performances of the contestants. Alongside the guests' appearances, several music directors, such as Yuvan Shankar Raja, D. Imman and Sean Roldan have promised to offer several contestants to sing in their albums and films. The music director, D. Imman, gave this offer to several exceptional contestants, such as Shamala Devi and Purushothaman after viewing their performances. Another music director, Sean Roldan, gave an offer to Jeevan and Purushothaman.

== Episodes ==
Episodes	Air Date(s)	Round Name	Best performers (weekly)	Special Guest(s) & Judge(s)
1	18 December 2022	Mega Blind Audition		Mysskin; Vaikom Vijayalakshmi
2	24 December 2022	Mega Blind Audition		Mysskin; Vaikom Vijayalakshmi
3	25 December 2022			
4	31 December 2022			Yuvan Shankar Raja
5	1 January 2023			
6	7 January 2023			Manju Warrier (Ahead of the release of Thunivu)
7	8 January 2023			Manju Warrier (Ahead of the release of Thunivu)
8	15 January 2023	Pongal celebration	Akshaya Shivkumar B Gopalakrishnan	Chinnaponnu; VM Mahalingam; Mathichiyam Bala
9	15 January 2023	Pongal celebration	Akshaya Shivkumar B Gopalakrishnan	Chinnaponnu; VM Mahalingam; Mathichiyam Bala
10	21 January 2023	Freestyle	Jeevan Padmakumar B Gopalakrishnan	Kanmani Manoharan
11	22 January 2023	Freestyle	Jeevan Padmakumar B Gopalakrishnan	Kanmani Manoharan
12	28 January 2023	Freestyle	Jeevan Padmakumar B Gopalakrishnan	Kanmani Manoharan
13	29 January 2023	Freestyle	Jeevan Padmakumar B Gopalakrishnan	Kanmani Manoharan
14	4 February 2023	Ninaithale inikkum	Bhavadayini	
15	5 February 2023	Ninaithale inikkum	Bhavadayini	
16	11 February 2023	Ninaithale inikkum	Raagawarshini	Kavin (actor) (Ahead of the release of Dada (2023 film))
17	12 February 2023	Ninaithale inikkum	Raagawarshini	
18	18 February 2023	Kaadhale kaadhali (Love songs)	Akshaya Shivkumar Sharath S Mathew	D. Imman
19	19 February 2023	Kaadhale kaadhali (Love songs)	Akshaya Shivkumar Sharath S Mathew	D. Imman
20	25 February 2023	Devotional songs	Jeevan Padmakumar B Gopalakrishnan	T. L.Maharajan; L. R. Eswari; Veeramani Raju
21	26 February 2023	Devotional songs	Jeevan Padmakumar B Gopalakrishnan	T. L. Maharajan Veeramani Raju
22	4 March 2023	Devotional songs	Jeevan Padmakumar B Gopalakrishnan	T. L. Maharajan Veeramani Raju
23	5 March 2023	Hero-Heroine hits	Chimmu Jayakumar; Bhoomika; Manikandan	Krish (singer); Mahathi
24	11 March 2023	Hero-Heroine hits	Shamala Devi; Lakshana Ashokkumar	Krish (singer); Mahathi
25	12 March 2023	Hero-Heroine hits	Shamala Devi; Lakshana Ashokkumar	Krish (singer); Mahathi
26	18 March 2023	Latest hits	Raagawarshini; Shamala Devi	
27	19 March 2023	Latest hits	Raagawarshini; Shamala Devi	Sean Roldan
28	25 March 2023	Hariharan hits		Hariharan (singer)
29	26 March 2023	Hariharan hits		Hariharan (singer)
30	1 April 2023	Marukkama Nenjil		
31	2 April 2023	Marukkama Nenjil		
32	8 April 2023	Neepaathi Naanpaathi	Lakshana Ashokkumar; Akshaya Shivakumar	
33	9 April 2023	Sa Re Ga Ma Pa Seniors & Super Jodi Maha Sanagamam		Chinnaponnu; Baba Bhaskar; Amardeep Chowdary; Tejaswini Gowda
34	15 April 2023	College Romance	Raagawarshini Purushothaman	Ramya Pandian; Ashwin Kumar Lakshmikanthan
35	16 April 2023	College Romance	Raagawarshini Purushothaman	Ramya Pandian; Ashwin Kumar Lakshmikanthan
36	22 April 2023	Dedication Round	B Gopalakrishnan Bavathayini Nagarajan	T. Rajendar
37	23 April 2023	Dedication Round	B Gopalakrishnan Bavathayini Nagarajan	T. Rajendar
38	29 April 2023	First Selection to the Final	Akshaya Shivkumar	Abhirami
39	30 April 2023	First Selection to the Final	Akshaya Shivkumar	Abhirami
40	6 May 2023	Thullal Paadalgal Round - Second Selection to the Final	Jeevan Padmakumar	Gangai Amaran
41	7 May 2023	Thullal Paadalgal Round - Second Selection to the Final	Jeevan Padmakumar	Gangai Amaran
42	13 May 2023	Black and White Round - Third Selection to the Final	Purushothaman; Manikandan; Lakshana Ashokkumar	P. Susheela; Karthik Raj; Shanthanu Bhagyaraj; Anandhi
43	14 May 2023	Black and White Round - Third Selection to the Final	Purushothaman; Manikandan; Lakshana Ashokkumar	Soori (actor); Yugendran
44	20 May 2023	Mass Hit Round	Gopalakrishnan; Manikandan; Shamala Devi	Arya (actor); Malgudi Subha
45	21 May 2023	Mass Hit Round	Gopalakrishnan; Manikandan; Shamala Devi	Arya (actor); Malgudi Subha
46	27 May 2023	Award Winning Scores Round - Fourth Selection to the Final	Lakshana Ashokkumar Raagawarshini	Hiphop Tamizha(Adhi Ramachandran ) Sujatha Mohan
47	28 May 2023	Award Winning Scores Round - Fourth Selection to the Final	Lakshana Ashokkumar Raagawarshini	Hiphop Tamizha(Adhi Ramachandran ) Sujatha Mohan
48	3 June 2023	Legends Round - Ilaiyaraaja		
49	4 June 2023	Legends Round - SPB		
50	10 June 2023	Fifth and Sixth Selection to the Final	Naga Arjun Raagawarshini	
51	11 June 2023	Fifth and Sixth Selection to the Final	Naga Arjun Raagawarshini	
52	17 June 2023	Pre-finals		Saindhavi Prakash; Kalpana Raghavendar Vaikom Vijayalakshmi
53	18 June 2023	GRAND FINALE - LIVE	Title Winner - Purushothaman First Runner Up - Raagawarshini Second Runner Up- Lakshana Ashokkumar Peoples' Favourite - Naga Arjun	G. V. Prakash Kumar; Shreya Ghoshal; Mano (singer); Santhanam (actor); Rajhesh Vaidhya; Nithyasree Mahadevan; Vaikom Vijayalakshmi; Malgudi Subha; Stephen Devassy; Ashwin Kumar Lakshmikanthan; Abhirami (actress); T. L. Maharajan; Sneha (actress) Chinnaponnu
54 & 55	24 June & 25 June 2023	Celebrations	All the Contestants of SRGMP gathered for celebration	

== Contestants ==
#	Name	Hometown
1	Dinesh Paandi	Karaikudi
2	Shamala Devi	Chennai
3	Jeevan Padmakumar	Thiruvananthapuram
4	Natasha Mathulaani Fernando	London; Trincomalee(Sri Lanka)
5	Gana Micheal	Chennai
6	B Gopalakrishnan	Chennai
7	Akshaya Shivakumar	Vellore
8	Sharath S Matthew	Chennai
9	Bavathayini Nagarajan	Chennai; Vannarpannai (Sri Lanka)
10	Naga Arjun	Ramanathapuram
11	Chimmu Jayakumar	Kollam
12	Purushothaman	Cuddalore
13	Raagawarshini	Chennai
14	Vijayabaskar	Ramanathapuram
15	Manikandan	Papanasam, Tirunelveli
16	Akash Ravikumar	Chennai
17	Anupa Anto	Kanyakumari
18	Lakshana Ashokkumar	Tiruppur
19	Guruprasath	Coimbatore
20	Bhoomika	Chennai
21	Vishnu Ram	Dindigul
22	Prarthana	Coimbatore
23	Sudarshini	Sri Lanka

== Rounds ==
#	Round 1 (Freestyle)	Round 2 (Ninaithale inikkum)	Round 3 (Kadhale kaadhali)	Round 4 (Devotional)	Round 5 (Hero-heroine)	Round 6 (Latest hits)	Round 7 (Hariharan Hits)	Round 8 (Marukkama Nenjil)	Round 9 (Nee paathi naan paathi)	Round 10 (College Romance)	Round 11 (Dedication Round)	Round 12 (First Selection to the Finals)	Round 13 (Thullal Paadalgal Round)	Round 14 (Black and White Round)	Round 15 (Mass Hit Round)	Round 16 (Award Winning Scores Round)	Round 17 (Ilaiyaraaja/SPB- Legends Round)	Round 18 (Fifth and Sixth Selection to the Final)	Round 19 (GRAND FINALE)
1	Dinesh Paandi	Dinesh Paandi	Akshaya Shivkumar	Manikandan	Manikandan	Sharath S Matthew	Akshaya Shivakumar	Akshaya Shivakumar	Akshaya Shivakumar	Raagawarshini	Lakshana Ashokkumar	Akshaya Shivakumar (#1 Finalist)	Jeevan Padmakumar (#2 Finalist)	Purushothaman (#3 Finalist)	Manikandan	Lakshana Ashokkumar (#4 Finalist)	Shamala Devi	Naga Arjun (#5Finalist)	Purushothaman
2	Shamala Devi	Shamala Devi	Sharath S Matthew	Bavathayini Nagarajan	Chimmu Jayakumar	Bavathayini Nagarajan	Shamala Devi	Raagawarshini	Naga Arjun	Lakshana Ashokkumar	Jeevan Padmakumar	Bavathayini Nagarajan	Purushothaman	Manikandan	Gopalakrishnan	Raagawarshini	Gopalakrishnan	Raagawarshini (#6 Finalist)	Raagawarshini
3	Jeevan Padmakumar	Jeevan Padmakumar	Natasha Mathulaani Fernando	Natasha Mathulaani Fernando	Bhoomika	Shamala Devi	Bavathayini Nagarajan	Gopalakrishnan	Lakshana Ashokkumar	Gopalakrishnan	Bavathayini Nagarajan	Jeevan Padmakumar	Natasha Mathulaani Fernando	Gopalakrishnan	Shamala Devi	Gopalakrishnan	Manikandan	Gopalakrishnan	Lakshana Ashokkumar
4	Natasha Mathulaani Fernando	Natasha Mathulaani Fernando	Gopalakrishnan	Gopalakrishnan	Purushothaman	Akshaya Shivakumar	Jeevan Padmakumar	Shamala Devi	Purushothaman	Dinesh Paandi	Shamala Devi	Manikandan	Raagawarshini	Lakshana Ashokkumar	Natasha Mathulaani Fernando	Bavathayini Nagarajan	Bavathayini Nagarajan	Shamala Devi	Naga Arjun
5	Gopalakrishnan	Gana Micheal	Shamala Devi	Akshaya Shivakumar	Raagawarshini	Gopalakrishnan	Naga Arjun	Bavathayini Nagarajan	Jeevan Padmakumar	Manikandan	Purushothaman	Raagawarshini	Bavathayini Nagarajan	Raagawarshini	Raagawarshini	Naga Arjun	Naga Arjun	Manikandan	Akshaya Shivkumar
6	Akshaya Shivakumar	Gopalakrishnan	Purushothaman	Jeevan Padmakumar	Lakshana Ashokkumar	Raagawarshini	Raagawarshini	Purushothaman	Shamala Devi	Natasha Mathulaani Fernando	Gopalakrishnan	Purushothaman	Lakshana Ashokkumar	Shamala Devi	Bavathayini Nagarajan	Natasha Mathulaani Fernando	Dinesh Paandi	Bavathayini Nagarajan	Jeevan Padmakumar
7	Vijayabaskar	Akshaya Shivakumar	Dinesh Paandi	Shamala Devi	Dinesh Paandi	Bhoomika	Purushothaman	Natasha Mathulaani Fernando	Raagawarshini	Bavathayini Nagarajan	Akshaya Shivakumar	Shamala Devi	Dinesh Paandi	Bavathayini Nagarajan	Lakshana Ashokkumar	Manikandan	Raagawarshini	Dinesh Paandi	
8	Bavathayini Nagarajan	Sharath S Matthew	Natasha Mathulaani Fernando	Purushothaman	Sharath S Matthew	Naga Arjun	Manikandan	Naga Arjun	Gopalakrishnan	Purushothaman	Natasha Mathulaani Fernando	Natasha Mathulaani Fernando	Shamala Devi	Dinesh Paandi	Dinesh Paandi	Shamala Devi	Natasha Mathulaani Fernando	Natasha Mathulaani Fernando	
9	Naga Arjun	Bavathayini Nagarajan	Anupa Anto	Bhoomika	Shamala Devi	Jeevan Padmakumar	Lakshana Ashokkumar	Jeevan Padmakumar	Bavathayini Nagarajan	Shamala Devi	Naga Arjun	Naga Arjun	Naga Arjun	Naga Arjun	Naga Arjun	Dinesh Paandi			
10	Bhoomika	Naga Arjun	Guruprasath	Vijayabaskar	Akshaya Shivakumar	Purushothaman	Natasha Mathulaani Fernando	Bhoomika	Natasha Mathulaani Fernando	Jeevan Padmakumar	Dinesh Paandi	Dinesh Paandi	Gopalakrishnan	Natasha Mathulaani Fernando					
11	Purushothaman	Chimmu Jayakumar	Manikandan	Akash Ravikumar	Gopalakrishnan	Natasha Mathulaani Fernando	Dinesh Paandi	Lakshana Ashokkumar	Bhoomika	Akshaya Shivakumar	Raagawarshini	Gopalakrishnan	Manikandan						
12	Raagawarshini	Purushothaman	Raagawarshini	Chimmu Jayakumar	Jeevan Padmakumar	Manikandan	Gopalakrishnan	Dinesh Paandi	Manikandan	Naga Arjun	Manikandan	Lakshana Ashokkumar							
13	Manikandan	Raagawarshini	Akash Ravikumar	Sharath S Matthew	Bavathayini Nagarajan	Dinesh Paandi	Sharath S Matthew	Manikandan	Dinesh Paandi	Bhoomika									
14	Akash Ravikumar	Vijayabaskar	Bhoomika	Raagawarshini	Naga Arjun	Lakshana Ashokkumar	Bhoomika	Sharath S Matthew	Sharath S Matthew										
15	Anupa Anto	Manikandan	Vijayabaskar	Anupa Anto	Vijayabaskar	Chimmu Jayakumar	Chimmu Jayakumar	Chimmu Jayakumar											
16	Lakshana Ashokkumar	Akash Ravikumar	Naga Arjun	Naga Arjun	Natasha Mathulaani Fernando	Vijayabaskar													
17	Guruprasath	Anupa Anto	Chimmu Jayakumar	Guruprasath	Gana Michael	Gana Michael													
18	Chimmu Jayakumar	Lakshana Ashokkumar	Jeevan Padmakumar	Dinesh Paandi	Akash Ravikumar														
19	Vishnu Ram	Guruprasath	Lakshana Ashokkumar	Gana Micheal	Anupa Anto														
20	Prarthana	Bhoomika	Gana Micheal	Lakshana Ashokkumar	Guruprasath														
21	Sudharshini	Vishnu Ram																	
22	Gana Micheal	Prarthana																	
23	Sharath S Matthew	Sudarshini																	

The contestant who won the title and received a Rs 10 lakhs cash prize award by Zee Tamil.
The contestant who became the first runner-up and awarded a received a Rs 5 lakhs cash prize award by Zee Tamil.
The contestant who became the second runner-up and received a Rs 3 lakhs cash prize award by Zee Tamil.
The contestant who became the peoples' favourite and received a Rs 1 lakh cash prize award by Zee Tamil.
The contestant who was selected to the finals with a golden performance tag
The contestant who was shortlisted prior to the finals with a golden performance tag
The contestant who received the golden performance tag
The contestant who saved from danger zone
The finalist who got disqualified from receiving a cash prize
The contestant who got eliminated due to insufficient performance
The contestant who got eliminated from the selection to the finals
The contestant who received the diamond performance tag
The contestant who was absent from the round or did not perform for the round

== Awards and nominations ==
Name of the award ceremony, year presented, category, nominee of the award, and the result of the nomination
Year	Award	Category	Recipient	Role	Result
2023	Zee Tamil Kudumbam Viruthugal 2023	Best Non-Fiction			Nominated
2024	Anandha Vikatan Chinnathirai Virudhugal	Favourite Reality Show			Won
