= Karthik (singer) =

Indian Playback singer

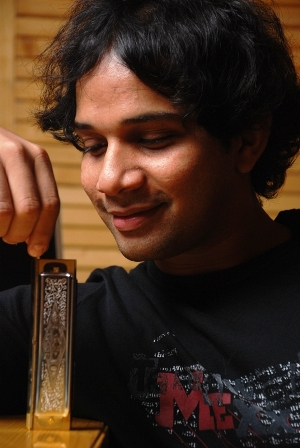

Background information
- Born: 7 November 1980 (age 45)
- Origin: Chennai, Tamil Nadu, India
- Occupations: Playback singer, Composer
- Instruments: Vocals, Keyboard
- Years active: 2000–present

Karthik (born 7 November 1980) is an Indian playback singer and composer. Karthik started his professional singing career as a backing vocalist and has since been working as a playback singer. He has sung more than 8000 songs in 15+ Indian languages including Tamil, Malayalam, Telugu, Kannada, Odia, Bengali, Marathi and Hindi.

== Early and personal life ==
Karthik was born on 7 November 1980 into a Tamil family and hails from Tiruvarur district. He is a trained Carnatic music vocalist. He was part of a college band and regularly participated in IIT Madras Fest Saarang. An ardent fan of A. R. Rahman, Karthik's dream was to meet Rahman and sing for him. Playback singer Srinivas, who often collaborated with Rahman, was Karthik's close friend's cousin. Srinivas encouraged Karthik to look at singing as a career, which prompted Karthik to resume his singing lessons. One year later, Srinivas recommended Karthik's name to Rahman, who needed fresh voices for backing vocalists for a song from Pukar. Karthik eventually got the opportunity and recorded for the song. Having spent over a year being a backing vocalist, Karthik got his break during Rahman's scoring of One 2 Ka 4. For the background score, A. R. Rahman wanted a high-pitched alap and he eventually chose Karthik to sing the alap. Soon after, Rahman asked him to sing the song "Nendhukittaen" from the film Star.

Karthik was a CA aspirant before he became a professional singer. He is married to Ambika, they have a daughter and a son.

== Career ==
Karthik has sung a number of songs for many popular music directors, including A. R. Rahman, Ilaiyaraaja, Harris Jayaraj, Vidyasagar, Rahul Raj, Hamsalekha, Devi Sri Prasad and Manisharma, in several languages – Tamil, Telugu, Kannada, Malayalam and Hindi. "Ennaku Oru Girlfriend" from the Tamil film Boys was one of a sensational hit of the year. The same year he rendered the US-produced Malayalam album song Pularmanjupol Nee with famed playback singer Sujatha Mohan. The song composed by Rahul Raj became a chartbuster and subsequently an evergreen classic. In 2005, he scored his first hit with composer Harris Jayaraj singing "Oru Maalai" (Ghajini; 2005). His songs for Telugu films for Kotha Bangaru Lokam (Nijanga Nenenaa), Happy Days (Arare Arare, Oh My Friend), "Yedhuta Nilachindi Choodu" (Vaana), "Badhulu Tochanai" (Mr.Perfect), "Manase Guvvai" (Naa Peru Shiva), "Oh Oh My Friend" (Oh My Friend), "Meghama" (Journey), "Yevvaro" (Bodyguard) are popular. His other popular songs include the title track from Unnale Unnale and "Mundhinam Paarthene" and "Ava Enna", both from Vaaranam Aayiram (2009). The dubbed versions of his Tamil songs in Telugu are also popular.

Karthik has sung Kannada songs and has many songs to his credit like Ale Ale, Anuraaga Aralo Samaya, Thangaliyalli Theli Hode, Nee Chummu Chummu Munjaaneli, Sum Sumne Yaako, Madhumasa, Nenapidu Nenapidu, Thanthaane Thannamthaane, Raktha Sambandhagala, and many more.

"Behka" from Ghajini is also popular. In 2010, he sang a track "Behene De", from Hindi film Raavan, which is widely considered as the biggest song in his career. The track, which topped music charts for many continuous weeks, also received rave critical reviews.

The song Yayum Ngayum from the album Sandham: Symphony Meets Classical Tamil is considered one of Karthik's career best for the way how he has brought sensuality to the 2000 year old poetry, in composer Raleigh Rajan's music. He received wide appreciations for the theme song of the 10th World Tamil Conference from the same album Sandham: Symphony Meets Classical Tamil. The album was featured in Amazon's Top#10 International Music albums in July 2020.

== Television ==
| Year | Program | Channel | Language | Notes |
|---|---|---|---|---|
| 2009 | Thendral | Sun TV | Tamil | Title song |
| 2009-10 | Amman (TV series) | Sun TV | Tamil | Title song (with Priya Himesh) |
| 2016 | Sa Re Ga Ma Pa Lil Champs | Zee Tamil | Tamil | Judging panel (with Vijay Prakash, Sujatha Mohan) |
| 2017-18 | Sa Re Ga Ma Pa Seniors | Zee Tamil | Tamil | Judging panel (with Vijay Prakash, Srinivas) |
| 2018 | Sa Re Ga Ma Pa Lil Champs (Season 2) | Zee Tamil | Tamil | Judging panel (with Vijay Prakash, Srinivas, Sujatha Mohan) |
| 2018 | Sa Re Ga Ma Pa 2018 | Zee Telugu | Telugu | Judging panel (with Chinmayi Sripaada, Ramajogayya Sastry) |
| 2019-2020 | Sun Singer (Season 6) | Sun TV | Tamil | Judging panel (with Mano, Remya Nambeesan) |
| 2022 | Telugu Indian Idol | Aha | Telugu | Judging panel (with Nithya Menen, Thaman S) |
| 2022-23 | Sa Re Ga Ma Pa Seniors (season 3) | Zee Tamil | Tamil | Judging panel (with Vijay Prakash, Srinivas, Remya Nambeesan) |
| 2023 | Sa Re Ga Ma Pa Tamil Li'l Champs (season 3) | Zee Tamil | Tamil | Guest judge |
| 2024 | Telugu Indian Idol | Aha | Telugu | Judging panel (with Thaman S, Geeta Madhuri) |
| 2024 | Sa Re Ga Ma Pa Seniors 4 | Zee Tamil | Tamil | Judging panel (with Vijay Prakash, Srinivas, Saindhavi Prakash) |
| 2025 | Sa Re Ga Ma Pa Seniors 5 | Zee Tamil | Tamil | Judging panel (with Vijay Prakash, Srinivas, Shweta Mohan) |

== Composing ==
He has composed music for a multi lingual Coca-Cola Advertisement (for Rajeev Menon featuring actor Vijay) and Prince Jewellery advertisements. He is the music director of Vasanthabalan's period film Aravaan and Srinivas Raga's Okkadine in Telugu.

He has also released an album called "Music I Like". It is based on carnatic ragaas and it is a contemporary take on some well known keerthanas. The orchestration was done by the music director Sai Madhukar.

He is the composer of the segment "Guitar Kambi Mele Nindru" directed by Gautham Vasudev Menon in the Netflix anthology movie Navarasa (2021). He has also composed music for the film Joshua Imai Pol Kaakha.

== Discography ==
=== As composer ===
==== Films ====
| Year | Title | Language |
|---|---|---|
| 2012 | Aravaan | Tamil |
| 2013 | Okkadine | Telugu |
| 2015 | Courier Boy Kalyan | Telugu |
| 2016 | Tamilselvanum Thaniyar Anjalum | Tamil |
| 2020 | Paava Kadhaigal | Tamil |
| 2021 | Kutty Story (Edhirpaara Muththam) | Tamil |
| 2021 | Navarasa | Tamil |
| 2024 | Joshua Imai Pol Kaakha | Tamil |
| 2024 | Appudo Ippudo Eppudo | Telugu |

- The films are listed in the order the films were released.

==== Music videos ====
| Year | Title | Role | Actors | Language | Ref. |
|---|---|---|---|---|---|
| 2018 | Koova Koova | Music video director | Sathish Krishnan, Chinnaponnu | Tamil | |
| 2018 | Ulaviravu | Music video director | Tovino Thomas, Divyadarshini | Tamil | |
| 2018 | Bodhai Kodhai | Music video director | Atharvaa, Aishwarya Rajesh | Tamil | |

=== As independent musician ===
Karthik is a part of a band called Arka which is a contemporary fusion band.

=== As a dubbing artist ===
Dubbed and sang for the character Aladdin for its 2019 version. He also lent his voice to Allu Arjun for the Tamil dubbed version of Ala Vaikunthapurramuloo, and also rendered the songs for the same.

== Controversies ==
As part of the #MeToo movement, Karthik was accused of sexual harassment in 2018 by several anonymous women. Singer Chinmayi Sripaada tweeted these allegations messaged to her by women who wished to remain anonymous. Karthik responded to the allegations by tweeting "I want to put it out there that I have never intentionally acted in a way that would make anybody feel uncomfortable or unsafe. If anybody felt hurt because of any of my actions in the past, please reach out to me directly. I do believe in facing the consequences of one's actions. I fully support #MeToo and if there's truth in anybody's grievance, I shall be more than willing to apologise or face legal action because I don't want to ever leave a sour taste in anyone's life".

In 2013 he was mistakenly awarded the Kerala State Film Award for Best Singer for the song "Janmandarangalil" from the movie Orisaa, which was actually sung by Pradeep Chandrakumar. Music director Ratheesh Vegha has revealed that although Karthik was chosen to sing the song, his rendition did not reach perfection and was replaced by Pradeep Chandrakumar who was to sing the track for this song. Pradeep's version was only included in the film and audio CD which was however credited to Karthik for commercial purposes.

== Awards ==
- Filmfare Awards South

| Year | Category | Language | Song | Film |
|---|---|---|---|---|
| 2005 | Best Male Playback Award | Tamil | Oru Maalai | Ghajini |
| 2007 | Best Male Playback Award (Telugu) | Telugu | Arey Rey | Happy Days |
| 2008 | Best Male Playback Award | Telugu | Nijanga Nenena | Kotha Bangaru Lokam |
| 2009 | Best Male Playback Award | Tamil | Hasili Fisili | Aadhavan |
| 2010 | Best Male Playback Award | Tamil | Usure Poguthey | Raavanan |
| 2016 | Best Male Playback Award (Telugu) | Telugu | Yellipokey Shyamala | A Aa |

- Other awards

| Year | Category | Song | Film | Language |
|---|---|---|---|---|
| 2003 | ITFA Best Male Playback Award | Oru Ooril | Kaakha Kaakha | Tamil |
| 2007 | Nandi Award for Best Male Playback Singer | Oh..My Friend | Happy Days | Telugu |
| 2008 | CineMAA Awards – Best Male Playback Singer | Oh..My Friend | Happy Days | Telugu |
| 2009 | Tamil Isaiaruvi Music Awards 2010 | Hasili Fisili | Aadhavan | Tamil |
| 2009 | Vijay Awards 2010 | Hasili Fisili | Aadhavan | Tamil |
| 2010 | Asiavision Awards Best Male Playback Singer | Neelathamara | Neelathaamara | Malayalam |
| 2010 | Vijay Music Awards – Popular Singer Male | Usure Poguthey | Raavanan | Tamil |
| 2010 | Tamil Nadu State Film Awards – Tamil Nadu State Film Award for Best Male Playback singer | Usure Poguthey | Raavanan | Tamil |
| 2010 | Mirchi Music Awards South – Best Male Playback Singer | Usure Poguthey | Raavanan | Tamil |
| 2011 | TSR TV9 National film awards – Best Playback Singer (Male) | Choosthunna | Mogudu | Telugu |
| 2012 | Amrita Film Awards 2012 – Versatile Singer | various songs | Ordinary, Spanish Masala | Malayalam |
| 2012 | Ghantasala Puraskar Award – Young Achiever Award 2012 | | | |
| 2012 | Mirchi Music Awards South – Best Male Playback Singer | Kaatrai Konjam | Neethane En Ponvasantham | Tamil |
| 2012 | Mirchi Music Awards South – Best Upcoming Music Director | Nila Nila | Aravaan | Tamil |
| 2013 | Globus Style Awards 2013 – Stylish Singer Award | | | Malayalam |
| 2017 | Asiavision Awards Best Male Playback Singer | ee Kaatu | Adam Joan | Malayalam |
| 2018 | Mazhavil Music Awards -/Best Male Singer | Kadavathoru thoni | Poomaram | Malayalam |
| 2021 | SIIMA Award for Best Male Playback Singer- Tamil | Anbe Anbin | Peranbu | Tamil |
