= Sa Re Ga Ma Pa Lil Champs =

2016 Indian-Tamil language musical reality TV game show

- Cover Photo
- Genre: Singing show Reality
- Based on: Sa Re Ga Ma Pa L'il Champs
- Directed by: VijayaKumar Vivekanandan
- Presented by: Archana Chandhoke
- Judges: Season 1 Karthik; Vijay Prakash; Sujatha Mohan; Season 2 Karthik; Srinivas; Sujatha Mohan; Vijay Prakash; Season 3 Srinivas; Abhirami; Vijay Prakash; Saindhavi Prakash; Season 4 Srinivas; Shweta Mohan; S. P. Charan; Saindhavi
- Country of origin: India
- Original language: Tamil
- No. of seasons: 5
- No. of episodes: Season 1: 40; Season 2: 53; Season 3: 50; Season 4: 62

Production
- Production location: Tamil Nadu
- Camera setup: Multi-camera
- Running time: approx. 40-45 minutes per episode approx. 85-90 minutes per episode

Original release
- Network: Zee Tamil
- Release: 24 December 2016 – present

Related
- Sa Re Ga Ma Pa L'il Champs

Sa Re Ga Ma Pa Li'l Champs is a 2016 Indian Tamil-language musical reality TV game show, which airs on Zee Tamil. The show based on the Hindi-language show Sa Re Ga Ma Pa L'il Champs. The series is meant for young children between the ages of 5–14 years, which judges the children on the basis of their voice quality, singing talent and versatility in performance. Since its premiere on 24 December 2016, the show has rolled out five seasons.

== Production ==
The show is a singing talent hunt for children of age group 5 to 15 years old in Tamil Nadu and other Tamil population by nation countries. In the auditions round, they have 100 seconds to impress the three to five judges and the 30 members of the grand jury and will select the top 24 contestants who will compete on the main show. Archana Chandhoke is as a host for all the seasons.

== Seasons overview ==
Season	Episodes	Original Broadcast	
Season	Episodes	First Aired	Last Aired
1	40	24 December 2016	7 May 2017
2	53	5 May 2018	3 November 2018
3	50	1 July 2023	17 December 2023
4	62	2 November 2024	12 May 2025
5		6 December 2025	7 June 2026

== Judges and Hosts ==
=== Judges ===
Seasons		Judges	Notes
1–2	Karthik	Indian playback singer and composer. Karthik started his professional singing career as a backing vocalist and has since been working as a playback singer.	
1–3	Sujatha Mohan	Indian playback singer.	
1-3	Vijay Prakash	Indian Playback singer and also a Music Composer.	
2-5	Srinivas	Playback singer who has sung over 2000 songs in South Indian Languages.	
2-5	Saindhavi	Indian Carnatic vocalist and playback singer.	
3	Abhirami	Tamil film and voice actress.	
4-5	S. P. Charan	Indian playback singer and actor works predominantly works in Tamil cinema and Telugu cinema.	
4-5	Shweta Mohan	Malayalam, Tamil, Telugu, Kannada and Hindi singer.	

=== Host ===
Seasons	Host	Notes
1-5	Archana Chandhoke	Tamil television presenter, actress and radio jockey who has primarily worked in Tamil film and television industry.
Grand Final Episode 40	Deepak Dinkar	Tamil anchor and actor, who has primarily appeared in Tamil television.

== Sa Re Ga Ma Pa Li'l Champs season 1 ==
The first season of the show began airing on 24 December 2016 to 7 May 2017 on every Saturday and Sunday at 19:00 (IST) for 40 episodes. The judges are singers Karthik, Vijay Prakash and Sujatha Mohan. Vishwa Prasad was the winner of season one.

=== Winners ===
Guest

- Jiiva: is a Tamil film actor, producer and philanthropist.

Winners	Notes	Amount won
Vishwa Prasad	Winners	₹ 40,00,000
Disathana	1st Runner up	₹ 3,00,000
Rakthash	2nd Runner up	₹ 2,00,000

Top 5 Finalist

- Ann Benson
- Vishwa Prasad
- Rakthash
- Disathana
- Niharika

=== Grand jury panel ===
- Ramji
- S. N. Surendar
- V. Uma Shankar
- Mohan Vaidya
- M. J. Shriram
- Ramya NSK
- Padmalatha
- Vinaitha
- Tanushree
- Jagadeesh Kumar
- Ninchi
- Reshmi
- A.SADIQ BASHA
- Nirmala

== Sa Re Ga Ma Pa Li'l Champs Season 2 ==
The second season aired on every Sunday at 6:30 pm from 5 May 2018 to 3 November 2018 and ended with 53 Episodes. Karthik, Srinivas, Sujatha Mohan and Vijay Prakash as the judges and Archana Chandhoke as the host. Idhazhika was the winner of second season.

=== Winners ===
Guest

- Sivakarthikeyan: is a Tamil film actor, producer.

Winners	Notes	Amount won
Idhazhika	Winners	₹ 40,00,000
Aryananda	1st Runner up	Gold weighing 1 kilogram
Bavin Vinoth & Sahana	2nd Runner up	₹ 3,00,000
Pravasthi	3rd Runner up	₹ 50,000

=== Participants ===
No.	Participants
1	Anirvinya
2	Srinand
3	Daisy Yensone
4	Aryashree
5	Devadarshini
6	Madhuvy
7	Srivishnu
8	Swathy
9	Aryanandha

== Sa Re Ga Ma Pa Li'l Champs Season 3 ==
The third season of Sa Re Ga Ma Pa Tamil Li'l Champs season 3 premiered on Zee Tamil on 1 July 2023. Archana Chandhoke has returned for the third time as host for the third season of Sa Re Ga Ma Pa Lil 'Champs . The four main judges of the show are Srinivas, Vijay Prakash, Abhirami (actress) and Saindhavi Prakash .

The Grand Finale took place on 17 December 2023. The grand finale consisted of six contestants. Three of the finalists are male and three other finalists are female.

The six finalists of Sa Re Ga Ma Pa Tamil Li'l Champs season 3 were Rikshitha Jawahar, Kilmisha, Sanjana, Ruthresh Kumar, Nishanth Kavin and Kanishkar.

The grand finale consisted of two rounds. The first round was called the freestyle round. Prior to the freestyle round, the audience were provided the option to select one song from a list of four options that they were provided. From the most chosen option, the finalists had sung that song for their first round of the grand finale, which was known as the freestyle round. The second round was called the challenging round.

Prize winners:

- Kilmisha was announced as the winner of season 3
- Ruthresh Kumar was announced as the first runner-up
- Sanjana was announced as the second runner-up
- Rikshitha Jawahar was announced as the third runner-up

Name of finalist	Title/prize	Name of song (round 1 – freestyle round)	Name of film/album	Singer(s)	Composer(s)	Name of song (round 2- challenging round)	Name of film/album	Singer(s)	Composer(s)
Kilmisha	Winner – Rs 1 million	Anbae Idhu	Rhythm	Sadhana Sargam	A. R. Rahman	Aila Aila	I	Natalie Di Luccio, Aditya Rao	A. R. Rahman
Ruthresh Kumar	First runner-up – Rs 300,000	Minnalae	May Maadham	S. P. Balasubrahmanyam	A. R. Rahman	Kaddu Thirande Kidakinrathu	Vasool Raja MBBS	Hariharan, Sadhana Sargam	Bharadwaj
Sanjana	Second runner-up – Rs 200,000	Poraale Ponnuthayi (sad version)	Karuthamma	Swarnalatha	A. R. Rahman	Idhayam	Kochadaiiyaan	Chinmayi Sripaada, Srinivas	A. R. Rahman
Rikshitha Jawahar	Third runner-up – Rs 100,000	Uyire Uyire	Bombay	Hariharan, K. S. Chithra	A. R. Rahman	Minsara Poove	Padayappa	Nithyasree Mahadevan, Srinivas, Palakkad Sreeram, Hariharan	A. R. Rahman
Kanishkar		Sandhosha Kanneere	Uyire	A. R. Rahman, Anuradha Sriram, Febi Mani, Annupamaa	A. R. Rahman	Aaromale	Vinnaithaandi Varuvaayaa	Alphons Joseph	A. R. Rahman
Nishanth Kavin		Poongaatru Puthithaanathu	Moondram Pirai	K. J. Yesudas	Ilaiyaraaja	Paattum Naane	Thiruvilaiyadal	T. M. Soundararajan	K. V. Mahadevan

== Sa Re Ga Ma Pa Li'l Champs Season 4 ==
The fourth season of Sa Re Ga Ma Pa Tamil Li'l Champs season 4 premiered on Zee Tamil on 2 November 2024. Archana Chandhoke has returned for the fourth time as host for the fourth season of Sa Re Ga Ma Pa Lil 'Champs . The judges of the show are Srinivas, S. P. Charan, Shweta Mohan and Saindhavi.

The six finalists of Sa Re Ga Ma Pa Tamil Li'l Champs season 4 are Hemithra, Sreemathi, Yogashree, Divinesh, Abinesh and Mahathi. The Grand Finale was held on 11 May 2024 on Sunday at 16:30 on Live. At the finals, Divinesh was the title winner and Yogashree claimed the first runners-up. Several guests that included in the grand finale are actors Sivakarthikeyan, Arya and Santhanam.

== Sa Re Ga Ma Pa Li'l Champs Season 5 ==
The 5th season of the Indian Tamil-language musical/singing reality television show Sa Re Ga Ma Pa Lil Champs. The season premiered on Zee Tamil from 6 December 2025. It features 48 young children between the ages of 5–14 years contestants progressing to the mega auditions and will select the top 24 contestants who will compete on the main show. Archana Chandhoke is returning as a host for the fourth time in a row.
