= T. L. Maharajan =

Indian playback singer (born 1954)

- Born: Trichy Loganathan Maharajan; 9 March 1954 (age 72); Trichy district, Tamil Nadu
- Genres: Playback singing, Classical Singer
- Occupations: Singer, actor, music director
- Years active: 1960–present
- Award: Kalaimamani Award (1998)

Tiruchi Loganathan Maharajan is an Indian musician. He is a Tamil classical and Tamil playback singer. In 1967, Maharajan began his 50-year career in playback singing with the devotional movie "Thiruvarutchelvar". He has also been a judge for many singing competitions programs worldwide.

== Early life ==
Maharajan was born in 1954, the son of Tiruchi Loganathan & Rajalakshmi Loganathan. His father was the first playback singer in the Tamil music industry.

His maternal grandmother was Kalaimamani C.T. Raajakaantham, one of the leading women comedians during 1940s in the Tamil cinema industry. His younger brother is Tamil playback singer, Dheepan Chakravarthy.

When he was 10, Maharajan acted and sang in a play called "Vallalar". Two years later, in 1967, he began a career in playback singing through the devotional movie "Thiruvarutchelvar". The song "Kaadhalagi Kasindhu", which he sang with Simma Kuraloan T. M. Soundarraajan, and which was composed by K.V. Mahadevan was a devotional number.

== Career ==
Maharajan has a 50 years in playback singing. Although he sings devotional songs most of the time, Maharajan has also sung songs such as "Nee Kattum Selai" from "Puthiya Mannargal", "Unnai Kelai" from "Desam", "Rettajadai Rakkamma" from "Anbe Anbe", Kadhal Yogi" from "Taalam", "Buck Buck Buck" from "Parthiban Kanavu" Avanapathi (Avan Ivan).

T. L. Maharajan has been a judge for many singing competitions programs worldwide.

=== Semmozhi Anthem ===
T. L. Maharajan was one of a number of singers who sang the "Semmozhiyaana Thamizh Mozhiyaam" song for the World Classical Tamil Conference 2010. He appeared on screen after G. V. Prakash Kumar and was followed by Bombay Jayashri. The visualisation of the theme song was directed by the renowned director Gautham Vasudev Menon which had an extremely positive response from the audience. The song features the fusion of various musical cultures including carnatic, folk, acoustic, sufi, rock and rap. The lyrics of the song were written by the popular politician M. Karunanidhi and composed by A. R. Rahman.

Other popular singers who sung the theme song are T. M. Soundararajan, P. Susheela, Bombay Jayashri, Aruna Sayeeram, Nithyasree Mahadevan, S. Sowmya, T. M. Krishna, Srinivas, Naresh Iyer, Harini, Chinmayi, Karthik, Hariharan, Yuvan Shankar Raja, Vijay Yesudas, G. V. Prakash Kumar, Blaaze, Lady Kash, Shruthi Hassan and Chinna Ponnu.

== Personal life ==
Maharajan is married to the actress Nirmala Devi with whom he has a daughter, Adhilakshmi Keerthana Kughaan.

== Awards ==
- Kalaimamani Award - 1998

== Albums ==
- Ayyappan Thunai
- Bhakthi Maalai (vol 1)
- Gajamuga
- Gananatha Om Gananatha
- Ganapathi Saranam
- Ganesha
- Kandha
- Kumbeshwara
- Murugan Arul
- Murugan Shanmugan
- Sabarikkattil Saranamazhai
- Sabarimalai Yaathirai
- Sri Bhairava
- Sri Bhairavar Kavasam
- Thirunaamam (sri Venkateshwara)
- Thulasi Malai
- Uzhaikkum Kaigale May Day Special
- Velayutha Saravanane Murugaiya
- Vinayagar Agaval & Suprabatham
- Vinayagar Thunai

== Television ==
Year	Name of Television Show	Role	Network
2024	Super Singer Season 10	Guest	Star Vijay

== Songs ==
Year	Film	Language	Song title	Music director	Co-singer
1967	Thiruvarutchelvar	Tamil	Sadhuram Marainthaal	K. V. Mahadevan	
1967	Thiruvarutchelvar	Tamil	Panniner Mozhiyaal	K. V. Mahadevan	T. M. Soundararajan
1967	Thiruvarutchelvar	Tamil	Kadhalaagi	K. V. Mahadevan	T. M. Soundararajan
1968	Thirumal Perumai	Tamil	Hari Hari Gokula	K. V. Mahadevan	T. M. Soundararajan & P. Susheela
1976	Dasavatharam	Tamil	Adhu Mutriya Kaliyin Avatharam	S. Rajeswara Rao	
1978	Oru Veedu Oru Ulagam	Tamil	Rathi Devi Sannathiyil Ragasiya Poojai	M. S. Viswanathan	B. S. Sasirekha
1978	Sri Kanchi Kamakshi	Tamil	Om Sakthi Om Sakthi	K. S. Raghunathan	Seerkazhi Govindarajan & S. C. Krishnan
1979	Kandhar Alangaram	Tamil	Sandhanam Manakkudhu	Kunnakudi Vaidyanathan	K. Veeramani
1979	Nallathoru Kudumbam	Tamil	Sevvaaname	Ilaiyaraaja	
1979	Pappathi	Tamil	Kalli Mara Kaattula Kanni Vachen	Shankar–Ganesh	T. K. Kala
1979	Sri Rama Jayam	Tamil	Endhan Karpanai	M. S. Viswanathan	B. S. Sasirekha
1980	Avan Aval Adhu	Tamil	Margazhi Pookkale Ilam Thendrale	M. S. Viswanathan	Vani Jairam
1980	Karumayil Or Azhagu	Tamil	Vandhavanellaam Vaazhndha	Agathiyar	
1980	Naan Potta Savaal	Tamil	Nenje Un Aasai Enna	Ilaiyaraaja	
1981	Indru Poi Naalai Vaa	Tamil	Ammadi Chinna	Ilaiyaraaja	Malaysia Vasudevan
1981	Indru Poi Naalai Vaa	Tamil	Mere Pyari	Ilaiyaraaja	
1981	Nadhi Ondru Karai Moondru	Tamil	Nadhi Ondru Karai Moondru	M. S. Viswanathan	
1981	Sivappu Malli	Tamil	Erimalai Eppadi Porukkum	Shankar–Ganesh	T. M. Soundararajan
1981	Sivappu Malli	Tamil	Avan Thodaadha	Shankar–Ganesh	T. M. Soundararajan & P. Susheela
1982	Om Sakthi	Tamil	Ongaariye Maakaaliye	Shankar–Ganesh	S. P. Sailaja
1982	Raga Bandhangal	Tamil	Naan Paadalukku	Kunnakudi Vaidyanathan	S. Janaki
1983	Jodi Pura	Tamil	Pagadai Kaaigalai Urutti	Shankar–Ganesh	
1987	Arul Tharum Ayyappan	Tamil	Aiyane Aiyappaa	Dasarathan	Lathika
1987	Arul Tharum Ayyappan	Tamil	Erimeli Pettai	Dasarathan	S. N. Vasanth
1987	Arul Tharum Ayyappan	Tamil	Sabarikku Nigaraana	Dasarathan	
1987	Meendum Mahaan	Tamil	Naanum Neeyum	VeeKay	S. P. Balasubrahmanyam, Malaysia Vasudevan & S. N. Surendar
1987	Nayakan	Tamil	Anthimazhai Megam	Ilaiyaraaja	P. Susheela
1988	Penmani Aval Kanmani	Tamil	Aarambame Ippathanu Ninaippom	Shankar–Ganesh	Malaysia Vasudevan
1989	Vaai Kozhuppu	Tamil	Edhedho Karpanai	Chandrabose	Lalitha Sagari
1990	Muthalali Amma	Tamil	Aatthoram Aalamaram	Chandrabose	S. P. Sailaja
1990	Muthalali Amma	Tamil	Akkam Pakkam Veettil	Chandrabose	S. P. Sailaja
1990	Periya Idathu Pillai	Tamil	Vaigai	Chandrabose	Malaysia Vasudevan
1992	Annan Ennada Thambi Ennada	Tamil	Akka Pasanga	Gyan Varma	T. M. S. Balraj
1994	Periya Marudhu	Tamil	Aalamara Vehru	Ilaiyaraaja	S. N. Surendar
1994	Periya Marudhu	Tamil	Poonthearil Yeri	Ilaiyaraaja	S. N. Surendar
1993	Seeman	Tamil	Ootu Kettu	Ilaiyaraaja	Mano
1994	Pudhiya Mannargal	Tamil	Nee Kattum Selai	A. R. Rahman	Sujatha
1995	Indira	Tamil	Munnerudhan	A. R. Rahman	Swarnalatha
1995	Indira	Telugu	Eavarukaa	A. R. Rahman	Swarnalatha
1995	Murai Mappillai	Tamil	Ezhulagam	Swararaj	
1995	Varraar Sandiyar	Tamil	Vaanam Pozhiyanum	Deva	
1996	Poove Unakkaga	Tamil	Machinichi	S. A. Rajkumar	P. Unnikrishnan & Sujatha
1997	Aravindhan	Tamil	Poovattam	Yuvan Shankar Raja	Swarnalatha
1997	Nattupura Nayagan	Tamil	Thevar Porandha	S. A. Rajkumar	Devi
1999	Maravathe Kanmaniye	Tamil	Raasatthi Manasukkulle	Mahakumar	S. P. Balasubrahmanyam, Swarnalatha
1999	Taalam	Tamil	Kaadhal Yogi	A. R. Rahman	Swarnalatha
2000	Krodham 2	Tamil	Ninaithal Un Kaiyil	Deva	Premgi Amaren
2001	Pandavar Bhoomi	Tamil	Aei Samba	Bharadwaj	Malgudi Subha & Yugendran
2003	Anbe Anbe	Tamil	Rettai Jadai Rakkamma	Bharadwaj	Manikka Vinayagam, Swarnalatha, Srinivas & Manorama
2003	Parthiban Kanavu	Tamil	Buck Buck Buck	Vidhyasagar	Balaram, Karthik, K. S. Chithra, Manjula, Sandhya, Kalyani Nair & Mano
2004	Desam	Tamil	Unnai Kelaai	A. R. Rahman	Hariharan
2005	Anda Naal Nyabagam	Tamil	Vaadi Vaadi Muyale	Bharadwaj	
2006	Imsai Arasan 23rd Pulikecei	Tamil	Vaanam Namakul	Sabesh–Murali	
2006	Kovai Brothers	Tamil	Sootta Kilappi	D. Imman	Srilekha Parthasarathy
2007	Sringaram	Tamil	Nattu Purappadal	Lalgudi Jayaraman	O. S. Arun
2007	Sringaram	Tamil	Nattu Purappadal	Lalgudi Jayaraman	O. S. Arun
2007	Thullal	Tamil	Kokkarikkum	Dhina	Uma
2011	Avan Ivan	Tamil	Avanapatthi Naan Paada Poren	Yuvan Shankar Raja	Sathyan
2015	Maanga	Tamil	Sriranjini Swaram Nee	Premgi Amaren	Premgi Amaren & Ramya NSK
2015	Panjumittai	Tamil	Kaattu Karuvamulla	D. Imman	Nithyasree Mahadevan
