= Sa Re Ga Ma Pa Seniors =

2017 Indian-Tamil-language reality singing television show

- Cover Photo
- Genre: Reality; singing show
- Based on: Sa Re Ga Ma Pa
- Directed by: VijayaKumar Vivekanandan
- Presented by: Archana Chandhoke
- Judges: Karthik; Vijay Prakash; Srinivas; Remya Nambeesan; Saindhavi; Swetha Mohan
- Country of origin: India
- Original language: Tamil
- No. of seasons: 4
- No. of episodes: 76

Production
- Production location: Tamil Nadu
- Camera setup: Multi-camera
- Running time: approx. 85–90 minutes per episode

Original release
- Network: Zee Tamil
- Release: 15 October 2017 – present

Related
- Sa Re Ga Ma Pa

Sa Re Ga Ma Pa Tamil is a 2017 Indian-Tamil language reality singing television show, airs on Zee Tamil and streamed on ZEE5. The show based on the Hindi Language show Sa Re Ga Ma Pa. Over six years, Sa Re Ga Ma Pa has rolled out four seasons and Archana Chandhoke has continued as a host for four seasons. The show serves a sequel to the 2016 shows as Sa Re Ga Ma Pa Lil Champs.

The show is meant for seniors between the ages of 18–60 years. This is the Seniors version of the Sa Re Ga Ma Pa Lil Champs show, which premiered in 2016. It's about seeks to discover the best playback recording voice and singing talent in Tamil Nadu, India through a series of state-wide auditions. The first season was premiered on 15 October 2017.

== Synopsis ==
The show is a singing competition with the judges selecting the best twenty performers while blindfolded who progress into the next stages.

== Series ==
Season	Episodes	Original Broadcast		Winner	Runner up
Season	Episodes	First Aired	Last Aired	Winner	Runner up
1	51	15 October 2017	14 April 2018	Varsha	Rockstar Ramani Ammal
2	25	18 May 2019	10 August 2019	Aslam	Karthick & Sukanya
SE	1 Special Episode	24 May 2020			
3	53	8 December 2022	18 June 2023	Purushothaman	Raagawarshini
4	TBA	27 April 2024			

== Judges and Hosts ==
=== Judges ===
Seasons	Judges	Notes
1–2	Sujatha Mohan	Indian playback singer who is popular for singing in Malayalam, Tamil and Telugu movies.
1 & 3	Karthik	Indian playback singer. he started his professional career as a backing vocalist and has since been working as a playback singer.
1–3	Vijay Prakash	Indian playback singer and also a film composer.
1–3	Srinivas	Playback singer who has sung over 2000 songs in South Indian Languages.
3	Remya Nambeesan	Indian actress, playback singer who primarily appears in Tamil and Malayalam films

=== Host ===
Seasons	Host	Notes
1–3	Archana Chandhoke	Indian television presenter, actress and radio jockey who has primarily worked in Tamil film and television industry.

== Sa Re Ga Ma Pa Seniors Season 1 ==
The first season was aired on Zee Tamil from 15 October 2017 until 14 April 2018 on every Saturday and Sunday. It is a new season of the show Sa Re Ga Ma Pa Lil Champs. The judges are playback singer and music composer Vijay Prakash, playback singer Karthik and playback singer Srinivas, host by Anchor Archana Chandhoke.

Sa Re Ga Ma Pa had crossover with Dance Jodi Dance 2.0 titled as "SaReGaMaPa & DJD 2.0 MahaSangamam" for the first time in Tamil television two Reality shows had cross over.

On 15 April 2018 during the live telecast of the Grand Finale of the show, Varsha emerged as the title winner of the inaugural edition of the Sa Re Ga Ma Pa Seniors and Rockstar Ramani Ammal claimed the first runners-up trophy.

Prize Winners:

- Winner : Varsha
- 1st Runner up : Rockstar Ramani Ammal
- 2nd runner up : Sanjay & Sreenidhi Sriprakash
- Best entertainer : Jaskaran Singh

== Sa Re Ga Ma Pa Seniors Season 2 ==
The second season aired on every Sunday from 18 May to 10 August 2019 and ended with 25 Episodes. Archana Chandhoke has returned as the host for the second time. Sujatha Mohan, Vijay Prakash and Srinivas as the judges.

Prize Winners:

- Winner : Aslam
- 1st runner up : Karthick and Sukanya
- 2nd runner up : Aishwarya

== Sa Re Ga Ma Pa Seniors Season 3 ==
The third season of the Sa Re Ga Ma Pa Seniors premiered on Zee Tamil on 18 December 2022. The four main judges of this show are Srinivas, Karthik, Vijay Prakash and Remya Nambeesan. Remya Nambeesan is the fourth new judge who has joined Sa Re Ga Ma Pa Seniors season 3. Archana Chandhoke has returned as the host for the third time.

During the Sa Re Ga Ma Pa Seniors season 3, several chief guests, all including singers, actors, actresses, music directors/composers, film directors, such as Gangai Amaran, G. V. Prakash Kumar, D. Imman, Yuvan Shankar Raja, Sean Roldan, Hiphop Tamizha(Adhi Ramachandran ), P. Susheela, Hariharan (singer), Shreya Ghoshal, Mano (singer), Sujatha Mohan, L. R. Eswari, Nithyasree Mahadevan, Vaikom Vijayalakshmi, Saindhavi Prakash, T. L. Maharajan, Malgudi Subha, Rajhesh Vaidhya, Kalpana Raghavendar, Krish (singer), Mahathi, Mysskin, T. Rajendar, Santhanam (actor), Arya (actor), Soori (actor), Sneha (actress), Abhirami (actress), Anandhi, Shanthanu Bhagyaraj, Kavin (actor), Kanmani Manoharan, Manju Warrier, Ashwin Kumar Lakshmikanthan, Ramya Pandian, Karthik Raj, Chinnaponnu, Baba Bhaskar, Yugendran, Stephen Devassy have been invited to the show and appreciated the marvellous performances of the spectacular contestants.

The Grand Finale took place on 18 June 2023. Initially, it was planned to have only five finalists. However, the judges made their decision to select a sixth finalist who had the highest number of votes from the public.

The five finalists of Sa Re Ga Ma Pa Seniors season 3 are Akshaya Shivkumar, Jeevan Padmakumar, Purushothaman, Lakshana Ashokkumar, Naga Arjun and Raagawarshini. Naga Arjun was selected by the highest number of public votes, not by the public. All other contestants were selected only by the judges.

However, there were several controversies for not selecting these extraordinary contestants, such as Shamala Mahesh and B Gopalakrishnan, to the finals, as they are now experiencing a time of parenthood.

Several guests that included in the finale are G. V. Prakash Kumar, Shreya Ghoshal, Mano (singer), Santhanam (actor), Sneha (actress), Abhirami (actress), Rajhesh Vaidhya, Nithyasree Mahadevan, Stephen Devassy, Vaikom Vijayalakshmi, Malgudi Subha, T. L. Maharajan, Ashwin Kumar Lakshmikanthan, Chinnaponnu, Teju Ashwini.

The Grand Finale consisted of two rounds. The first round was called the freestyle round. This round was where the finalists collaborated with Stephen Devassy on the keyboard section. The second round was called the challenging round. This was where the finalists collaborated with Rajhesh Vaidhya, who was playing the veena.

During the grand finale, Purushothaman was promoted to refurbish his home, given 100,000 by Zee Tamil. In addition, Lakshana Ashokkumar was generated an AI (Artificial Intelligence) facial video message of her father, who had died, saying a message to Lakshana during the event. Also, she was presented a doll of her father.. On the other hand, Naga Arjun was presented a boat, with his name, to do fishing.

Prize Winners:

- Purushothaman was announced the Title Winner of Sa Re Ga Ma Pa Seniors season 3 by Shreya Ghoshal and received a Rs 1 million cash prize award by Zee Tamil.
- Raagawarshini was announced by Mano (singer) as the first runner-up of Sa Re Ga Ma Pa Seniors season 3 and was awarded a Rs 500,000 cash prize award by Zee Tamil.
- Lakshana Ashokkumar, announced by Vijay Prakash and Srinivas, was credited as the second runner-up of Sa Re Ga Ma Pa Seniors season 3 and was awarded a Rs 300,000 cash prize award by Zee Tamil.
- Naga Arjun was announced as the peoples' favourite singer of Sa Re Ga Ma Pa Seniors season 3 and was awarded a Rs 100,000 cash prize award by Zee Tamil.

Name of Finalist	Title/Prize	Name of Song (Round 1 – Freestyle Round)	Name of Film/Album	Singer(s)	Composer(s)	Name of Song (Round 2- Challenging Round)	Name of Film/Album	Singer(s)	Composer(s)
Purushothaman	Title Winner – Rs 1 million	Theeyil Vizhuntha	Varalaru	A. R. Rahman	A. R. Rahman	Ullathil Nalla Ullam	Karnan (1964 film)	Sirkazhi Govindarajan	Viswanathan–Ramamoorthy
Raagawarshini	First Runner-up – Rs 500,000	Hai Rama Oh Varama	Rangeela (1995 film)	Hariharan (singer), Swarnalatha	A. R. Rahman	Singaravelane Deva	Konjum Salangai	S. Janaki	S. M. Subbaiah Naidu
Lakshana Ashokkumar	Second Runner-up – Rs 300,000	Anbae Idhu	Rhythm (2000 film)	Sadhana Sargam	A. R. Rahman	Kavithai Kelungal Karuvil	Punnagai Mannan	Vani Jairam, P. Jayachandran	Ilaiyaraaja
Naga Arjun	Peoples' Favourite – Rs 100,000	Tharaimel Pirakka	Padagotti	T. M. Soundararajan	Viswanathan–Ramamoorthy	Poongkaatrilae	Dil Se..(Uyire)	Unni Menon, Swarnalatha	A. R. Rahman
Jeevan Padmakumar	Disqualified	Aaromale	Vinnaithaandi Varuvaayaa	Alphons Joseph, A. R. Rahman	A. R. Rahman	Om Sivoham	Naan Kadavul	Vijay Prakash	Ilaiyaraaja
Akshaya Shivkumar	Disqualified	Adiye	Kadal (2013 film)	Sid Sriram, Maria Roe Vincent	A. R. Rahman	Mannavan Vanthaanadi	Thiruvarutchelvar	P. Susheela	K. V. Mahadevan

== Sa Re Ga Ma Pa Seniors Season 4 ==
The fourth season of Sa Re Ga Ma Pa Seniors, its aired on Zee Tamil from 27 April 2024 and on every Saturday and Sunday at 19:00.

On 20 October 2024, uring the live telecast of the Grand Finale of the show, Magizhan Paridhi emerged as the title winner of the inaugural edition of the Sa Re Ga Ma Pa Seniors season 4 and Shwetha claimed the first runners-up.

Prize Winners:

- Magizhan Paridhi was announced the Title Winner of Sa Re Ga Ma Pa Seniors season 4 by Harris Jayaraj and received a Rs 10 Lakh cash prize award by Zee Tamil.
- Shwetha Sristi
- Veerapandi, announced by Saindhavi
- Saran Kumar was announced as the peoples' favourite singer of Sa Re Ga Ma Pa Seniors season 4.

== Sa Re Ga Ma Pa Seniors Season 5 ==
The fifth season been launched on 24 May 2025 on every Saturday and Sunday at 19:00. The following judges from the previous seasons Srinivas, Vijay Prakash, Saindhavi and Shweta Mohan.

== Awards and nominations ==
Year	Award	Category	Recipient	Result
2018	1st Galatta Nakshathra Awards	Best Weekend Entertainer Show	Sa Re Ga Ma Pa Seniors	Won
2023	Anandha Vikatan Chinnathirai Virudhugal	Favourite Reality Show	Sa Re Ga Ma Pa Seniors Season 3	Won

== See also ==
- Sa Re Ga Ma Pa Bangla
- Sa Re Ga Ma Pa Hindi
- Sa Re Ga Ma Pa Kannada
- Sa Re Ga Ma Pa Keralam
- Sa Re Ga Ma Pa Marathi
- Sa Re Ga Ma Pa Telugu
