= Super Jodi =

Indian Tamil-language reality television show

- Original title: சூப்பர் ஜோடி
- Genre: Reality; Game show
- Presented by: RJ Vijay; Keerthi Shanthanu
- Judges: Sangeetha; Baba Bhaskar
- Country of origin: India
- Original language: Tamil
- No. of seasons: 1
- No. of episodes: 19

Production
- Production location: Tamil Nadu
- Camera setup: Multi-camera
- Running time: approx.60–70 minutes per episode

Original release
- Network: Zee Tamil
- Release: 5 February – 4 June 2023

Super Jodi is a 2023 Indian Tamil-language reality television show on Zee Tamil. It premiered on 5 February 2023 every Sunday at 18:30 and is also available on Zee5.

The show is perceived to challenge the real emotional bond and human connections of 10 real-life Tamil celebrity couples. Sangeetha and Baba Bhaskar as the judges and RJ Vijay and Keerthi Shanthanu as the hosts.

On 4 June 2023 during the telecast of the Grand Finale of the show, Selvakumar and Chinnaponnu emerged as the title winner of the inaugural edition of the Super Jodi and Rajkumar and Shamili Sukumar claimed the first runners-up trophy.

== Format ==
This show features 10 real life celebrity couple of the Tamil television industry.

== Contestants ==
#	Contestants	Notes
1	KPY Naveen & Krishnakumari	
2	Selvakumar & Chinnaponnu	
3	Kenny & Shanmathi	
4	Vikram & Dhivyaa	
5	VJ Mal Maruga & Shwetha Bandekar	
6	Amardeep & Tejaswini	
7	Vishwa Sam & Nakshatra	
8	Ramesh & Saroja Devi	
9	Rajkumar & Shamili Sukumar	
10	Sathyaraj & Sowmiya	

== Awards and nominations ==
Name of the award ceremony, year presented, category, nominee of the award, and the result of the nomination
Year	Award	Category	Recipient	Role	Result
2023	Zee Tamil Kudumbam Viruthugal 2023	Best Non-Fiction			Nominated
