= Sa Re Ga Ma Pa Tamil Li'l Champs season 4 =

Sa Re Ga Ma Pa Tamil Li'l Champs
- Season 4
- Saregamapa Lil Champs Season 4
- Presented by: Archana Chandhoke
- Judges: Srinivas; Shweta Mohan; S. P. Charan; Saindhavi
- Winner: Divinesh
- Runner-up: Yogashree
- No. of episodes: 62

Release
- Original network: Zee Tamil; ZEE5
- Original release: 2 November 2024 – 12 May 2025

Season chronology
- ← Previous; Season 3 Next → Season 5

Sa Re Ga Ma Pa Tamil Li'l Champs season 4 is a season of the reality television series Sa Re Ga Ma Pa Lil Champs.

Anchor Archana Chandhoke return as host for the fourth season of Sa Re Ga Ma Pa Tamil Li'l Champs. Srinivas and Saindhavi continues as judge of the fourth season, alongside new judge Shweta Mohan and S. P. Charan. The show is provides an inspiring platform for aspiring child singers. The mega auditions saw the four judges along with special judges with well-known playback singers, such as Vijay Prakash and Vaikom Vijayalakshmi.

The six finalists of Sa Re Ga Ma Pa Tamil Li'l Champs season 4 are Hemithra, Sreemathi, Yogashree, Divinesh, Abinesh and Mahathi. The Grand Finale was held on 11 May 2024 on Sunday at 16:30 on Live. At the finals, Divinesh was the title winner and Yogashree claimed the first runners-up. Several guests that included in the grand finale are actors Sivakarthikeyan, Arya and Santhanam.

== Judges ==
Judges	Description
Shweta Mohan	Malayalam, Tamil, Telugu, Kannada and Hindi singer.
S. P. Charan	He is a Telugu and Tamil playback singer as well as a host . S. P. Charan is the son of legendary playback singer S. P. Balasubrahmanyam.

== Format ==
The open auditions are conducted in various cities in Tamil Nadu, resulting in 48 contestants advancing to mega auditions, and are the first stage in determining judges will select 26 finalists.

== Contestants ==
#	Name	Hometown	Age	Statut
9	Geena	Kanyakumari	14	Evicted
2	Yogashree	Karur	13	Runner-up
3	Sanchita	Tambaram, Chennai	13	Evicted
4	Sreemathi	Nagapattinam	13	Evicted
5	Mahathi	Kanchipuram	8	Evicted
6	Jeevamprika	Madurai	13	Evicted
7	Harini	Coimbatore	14	Evicted
8	Akshatha	Bangalore	9	Evicted
1	Divinesh	Chennai	11	Winner
10	Bhuvanesh	Ooty	6	Evicted
6	Yogeshwaran	Kuthalam	14	Evicted
12	Harshika	Pondicherry	10	Evicted
3	Hemithra	Malaysia	12	2nd Runner-up

== Episodes ==
Episode Number	Air Date(s)	Round Name	Prize winners (weekly)	Special Guest(s) & Judge(s)
1	2 November 2024	Mega Auditions		Vijay Prakash and Vaikom Vijayalakshmi
2	3 November 2024	Mega Auditions		Vijay Prakash and Vaikom Vijayalakshmi
3	9 November 2024	Mega Auditions		N/A
4	10 November 2024	Mega Auditions		N/A
5	16 November 2024	Introduction Round	Yogashree ₹ 5000 (Gift)	N/A
6	17 November 2024	Introduction Round	Yogashree ₹ 5000 (Gift)	N/A

== Production ==
=== Promotion ===
From 14 to 17 November 2024, Zee Tamil was promoted this show by making To mark Children's Day, pread joy across Chennai by distributing 30,000 colorful balloons at key city hubs over four days. From 19 to 21 Sare ga ma Pa lilchamps season 4 mahasangam
