= Srinivas (singer) =

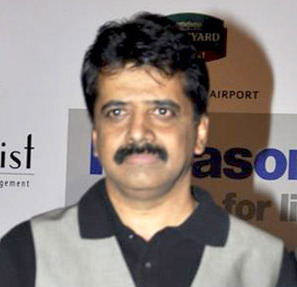
- Srinivas in 2010

Background information
- Also known as: Jeans Srinivas
- Born: Srinivasan Doraiswamy; 7 November 1959 (age 67)
- Origin: Ambasamudram, Tirunelveli, Tamil Nadu, India
- Genre: Film score
- Occupations: Playback singer, Composer
- Years active: 1993–present

Srinivasan Doraiswamy, known by his stage name Srinivas or Jeans Srinivas, is an Indian playback singer in the Tamil, Malayalam, Telugu, Kannada, and Hindi music industries. Credited to 3000 songs, he is also a music composer, working on projects including films, jingles, albums, television serials, and devotional albums. He received the Kalaimamani award by the Tamil Nadu state government in 2005 and the Tamil Nadu State Film Award twice for the songs "Minsara Poove" (Padayappa) in 1999 and "Maargazhiyil" (Onbadhu Roobai Nottu) in 2008. He has also received the Best Male Singer Kerala State Film Award for the song "Bhasuri" (Rathri Mazha) in 2007, the Film Critics Award for Best Composer for the movie "Seetha Kalyanam" in 2009, and Best Playback Singer for "Kaisi Hai Yeh Ruth" (Dil Chahta Hai).

== Early life ==
Singer Srinivas was born on 7 November in Ambasamudram in Tamil Nadu to Duraiswamy and Lakshmi.

== Career ==
Srinivas began his musical journey in 1992 after being inspired by the soundtrack of Mani Ratnam's Tamil film "Roja," which featured fresh voices and sounds by debut composer A.R. Rahman. Encouraged by Rahman, Srinivas relocated to Chennai in 1993 to pursue music seriously. His first film song was for the Telugu movie "One By Two" in Vidyasagar's music. He gained recognition with his rendition of Mehdi Haasan's ghazals, leading Rahman to offer him work in Chennai.

Srinivas collaborated extensively with Rahman, singing tracks for several films. His notable works include "Mellisaiye" from "Mr. Romeo" (1996) and "En Uyire" from "Uyire" (1998). He achieved widespread acclaim with hits like "Minsaara Poove" from "Padayappa" (1999), earning him his first Tamil Nadu Government State award for Best Male Singer. Srinivas continued his successful collaboration with Rahman, contributing to songs like "Endendrum Punnagai" and "Snehidhane" from "Alaipayuthey" (2000) and "Muzhumadhi" from "Jodha Akbar" (2008).

Apart from Tamil, Srinivas also worked on Telugu albums with Rahman, earning the moniker "Jeans Srinivas" after the popularity of his song "Priya Priya" in the Telugu version of the movie "Jeans." His association with Rahman extended to Malayalam, with recent contributions to films like "Galatta Kalyanam" (2021) and the Malayalam version of "Ponniyin Selvan - II." Throughout his career, Srinivas has been known for his versatile voice and close collaboration with A.R. Rahman.

== Television ==
He has frequently appeared as a judge in Vijay Television Super Singer, Zee Tamil Sa Re Ga Ma Pa, and other reality shows of Tamil Nadu.

Year	Program	Channel	Language
2026	Sa Re Ga Ma Pa Li'l Champs 2	Zee Keralam	Malayalam
2025	Sa Re Ga Ma Pa Li'l Champs 5	Zee Tamil	Tamil
2025	Sa Re Ga Ma Pa Seniors 5	Zee Tamil	Tamil
2024	Sa Re Ga Ma Pa Li'l Champs 4	Zee Tamil	Tamil
2024	Sa Re Ga Ma Pa Seniors 4	Zee Tamil	Tamil
2024	Star Singer 9	Asianet	Malayalam
2023	Sa Re Ga Ma Pa Tamil Li'l Champs 3	Zee Tamil	Tamil
2022-2023	Sa Re Ga Ma Pa Seniors 3	Zee Tamil	Tamil
2021	Rockstar (Indian TV series)	Zee Tamil	Tamil
2019	Top Singer Season 1	Flowers TV	Malayalam
2019	Sa Re Ga Ma Pa Seniors 2	Zee Tamil	Tamil
2017-2018	Sa Re Ga Ma Pa Seniors	Zee Tamil	Tamil
2015-2016	Super Singer 5	Star Vijay	Tamil
2014	Super Singer 4	Star Vijay	Tamil
2010-2011	Super Singer 3	Star Vijay	Tamil
2008	Super Singer 2	Star Vijay	Tamil
2006	Super Singer 1	Star Vijay	Tamil

== Awards ==
- Kalaimamani, Government of Tamil Nadu
- Best Male Singer - Rathri Mazha, Kerala state film awards
- Tamil Nadu State Film Award for Best Male Playback - Padayappa and Onbadhu Roobai Nottu
- 2017 - Vijay Television Awards for Favourite Judge Male Vijay Television Awards

== Discography ==
=== Tamil discography (selected songs) ===
Year	Film	Song	Composer(s)	Co-singer(s)	Lyricist
1998	Uyire (D)	“Ennuyire”	A. R. Rahman	Sujatha Mohan	Vairamuthu
1999	Taj Mahal	“Chotta Chotta”	A. R. Rahman		Vairamuthu
1999	Padayappa	“Minsara Poove”	A. R. Rahman	Nithyasree Mahadevan, Palakkad Sreeram	Vairamuthu
2008	Jodhaa Akbar (D)	“Muzhumathy”	A. R. Rahman		Na. Muthukumar
2014	Naan Than Bala	“Uyire Unakkaga”	Venkat Krishi	Priyadarshini	Na. Muthukumar

=== Telugu discography ===
Year	Film	Song	Composer(s)	Co-singer(s)
1993	Donga Donga (D)	"Etilona Chepalanta"	A. R. Rahman	Suresh Peters
1993	Gentleman (D)	"Maavele Maavele"	A. R. Rahman	Minmini, Noel James
1994	Palnati Pourusham	"O Silku Paapa"	A. R. Rahman	Malgudi Subha, Suresh Peters
1995	Bombay (D)	"Poolakundi Komma"	A. R. Rahman	Pallavi, Subha, Anupama
1995	Bombay (D)	"Idhu Matrubhoomi"	A. R. Rahman	Sujatha Mohan, Noel
1995	Vaddu Bava Thappu	"Hello Hello Sreevaru"	Vidyasagar	K. S. Chithra
1996	Prema Desam (D)	"Hello Doctor"	A. R. Rahman	KK
1996	Mr. Romeo (D)	"Evaridhi Evaridhi"	A. R. Rahman	Noel James, Chandran, Anto
1997	Merupu Kalalu (D)	"Oh La La La"	A. R. Rahman	K. S. Chithra, Unni Menon
1998	Jeans (D)	"Priya Priya Champodde"	A. R. Rahman	
1998	Jeans (D)	"Gundello Gayanni"	A. R. Rahman	
1998	Aahaa..!	"Manasaina"	Vandemataram Srinivas	
1998	Pelli Peetalu	"Chitapata Chinukulu"	S. V. Krishna Reddy	K. S. Chithra
1998	Pelli Peetalu	"Jil Jil Jil"	S. V. Krishna Reddy	K. S. Chithra
1998	Prematho (D)	"Ooristhu Ooguthu"	A. R. Rahman	Sujatha Mohan
1999	Jodi (D)	"Nanu Preminchananu"	A. R. Rahman	Sujatha Mohan
1999	Premikula Roju (D)	"Manasu Padi"	A. R. Rahman	M. G. Sreekumar
1999	Premikula Roju (D)	"Roja Roja"(Sad)	A. R. Rahman	
1999	Premaku Velayera	"Kannu Kannu Kalupukoni"	S. V. Krishna Reddy	K. S. Chithra
1999	Oke Okkadu (D)	"Eruvaka Saguthundaga"	A. R. Rahman	Swarnalatha
1999	Narasimha (D)	"Meriseti Puvva"	A. R. Rahman	Nithyasree Mahadevan
1999	A. K. 47	"Alala Alala Nee Kosam"	Hamsalekha	K. S. Chithra
1999	Harischandraa	"Daychey Dora"	Agosh	Gopal Rao
1999	Harischandraa	"Vinudu Vinudu Antha"	Agosh	Mano
2000	Sakhi (D)	"Vasanthapu"	A. R. Rahman	Shankar Mahadevan
2000	Sakhi (D)	"Snehituda Snehituda"	A. R. Rahman	Sadhana Sargam
2000	Sakhi (D)	"Maangalyam"	A. R. Rahman	Clinton Cerejo
2000	Manoharam	"Bharatha Maatha"	Mani Sharma	K. S. Chithra
2000	Priyuralu Pilichindi (D)	"Yemaaye Naa Kavitha"	A. R. Rahman	K. S. Chithra
2000	Chirunaama (D)	"O Sakha Sakha"	Deva	Swarnalatha
2000	Madhuri	"Gee Laila"	Murali	Gopika Poornima
2000	Madhuri	"Sannaga O Pilupu"	Murali	Sujatha Mohan
2000	Premani Cheppara (D)	"Adhe Vennela"	Rajesh Roshan	
2000	Premani Cheppara (D)	"Nidurinche Gundela"	Rajesh Roshan	
2001	Durga	"Kannukotti"	SD Shantakumar	
2001	Akrosham (D)	"Amma Antunna"	Yuvan Shankar Raja	
2001	Prematho Raa	"Preminchadame"	Mani Sharma	
2001	Hanuman Junction	"Konaseemallo O Koyila"	Suresh Peters	K. S. Chithra
2001	Kushi	"Cheliya Cheliya"	Mani Sharma	Harini
2001	Cheli (D)	"Varshinche Megham"	Harris Jayaraj	
2001	Chiranjeevulu	"Anuraagam Anubandham"	A.B.Murali	K. S. Chithra
2001	Chiranjeevulu	"Palliey Pachani"	A.B.Murali	Gopika Poornima
2001	Ramana	"Raayanchala Raave"	Maharshi	Amrutha
2002	Bramhachari (D)	"Sakala Kala Vallabuda"	Deva	Sujatha Mohan
2002	Bramhachari (D)	"Ghatothkacha"	Deva	Sujatha Mohan
2002	Priyadarshini	"Maatalake Andhanidi"	Mani Sharma	Prasanna
2002	Allari	"Nara Naram"	Paul J	Aparna
2002	Baba (D)	"Baba Theme"	A. R. Rahman	
2002	Panchatantram (D)	"Meri Jaan"	Deva	Shalini
2002	Kanulu Moosina Neevaye	"Aalapana Aagena"	Chakri	Sunitha Upadrashta
2003	Donga Ramudu And Party	"Chalirathiri"	Chakri	Sunitha Upadrashta
2003	Ammayilu Abbayilu	"Neeloni Andhalu"	Chakri	Kousalya
2003	Ammayilu Abbayilu	"Ishtapadi Ishtapadi"	Chakri	Kousalya
2003	Ishtapadi	"Rayabharamenduke"	M. M. Srilekha	Sujatha Mohan
2004	Gharshana	"Ye Chilipi"	Harris Jayaraj	
2004	Megham	"Neepai Naakunnadi"	K. M. Radha Krishnan	K. S. Chithra
2005	Preminchi Choodu (D)	"Enno Janmala Bandham"	Harris Jayaraj	Saindhavi
2005	Aaru (D)	"Hrudayam Anu"	Devi Sri Prasad	Srilekha Parthasarathy
2005	Mr Errababu	"Neeli Meghala"	Koti	Malavika
2005	Naidu LLB	"Nuvve Nuvve"	S. A. Rajkumar	Harini
2005	Thaka Thimi Tha (D)	"Neelo Dagina Prema"	D. Imman	Usha
2005	Thaka Thimi Tha (D)	"Himsa"	D. Imman	
2005	Muddula Koduku (D)	"Chirugali"	Vidyasagar	Sadhana Sargam
2006	Bommarillu	"Bommanu Geesthe"	Devi Sri Prasad	Gopika Poornima
2006	Raghavan (D)	"Hrudayame"	Harris Jayaraj	Mahalakshmi Iyer
2006	Kokila	"Kokila Kokila"	Madhukar	Shreya Ghoshal
2006	Vesavi (D)	"Urikene Manasane"	G. V. Prakash Kumar	Shreya Ghoshal
2007	Himsinche 23Va Raju Pulikesi (D)	"Aasha Kanvey"	Sabesh–Murali	
2007	Nava Vasantham	"Friendshippe Thiyyani"	S. A. Rajkumar	Tippu, Gopika Poornima
2007	Sathyabhama	"Theme Music"	Chakri	
2007	Deva (D)	"Peguthenchukunna"	Yuvan Shankar Raja	
2007	Tinnama Padukunnama, Tellarinda	"Konchem Konge Pattu"	M. M. Srilekha	M. M. Srilekha
2008	Jodhaa Akbar (D)	"Aamani Ruthuvu"	A. R. Rahman	
2008	Jayam Mandhe (D)	"Nee Vechiunna Vakili"	Vidyasagar	Shravya
2008	Adivishnu	"Eedu Rangula Harivillu"	M. M. Srilekha	K. S. Chithra
2009	Ananda Thandavam (D)	"Poovunai"	G. V. Prakash Kumar	Harini
2009	Sontha Ooru	"Kanula Vakite Kadulutunna"	Saketh Sairam	
2010	Pappu	"Mellaga O"	Phani Kalyan	Radhika
2010	Maa Annayya Bangaram	"Inti Maharani"	S. A. Rajkumar	Srividhya, Manasa, Murali
2014	Lingaa (D)	"Chinna Chinna"	A. R. Rahman	Aditi Paul
2014	Premalayam (D)	"Chalunaya"	A. R. Rahman	Bela Shende
2015	Anekudu (D)	"Yegise Nadhi"	Harris Jayaraj	Shakthisree Gopalan

=== Kannada discography (selected songs) ===
Year	Film	Song	Composer(s)	Co-singer(s)	Lyricist
1998	Yaare Neenu Cheluve	“Kushalave Kshemavee“	Hamsalekha	Anuradha Sriram	Hamsalekha
2004	Maurya	Usiraguve Hasiraguve	Gurukiran	Shreya Ghoshal	K. Kalyan

=== As music composer ===
Films

Year	Film	Language	Notes
2000	En Iniya Ilamaane	Tamil	Film unreleased
2002	Yai! Nee Romba Azhaga Irukke!	Tamil	Composed one song "Ini Naanum"
2003	Ivar	Malayalam	
2009	Seetha Kalyanam	Malayalam	
2010	Kushti	Hindi	
2011	The Train	Malayalam	
2015	Kangaroo	Tamil	

=== Onscreen appearances ===
Albums
Year	Film	Language	Notes
1999	Poovellam Kettuppar	Tamil	appearance in song "Sevvaanam Vetkam Kondathu"
2008	Vallamai Tharayo	Tamil	appearance in song "En Veettil"
2019	Sarvam Thaala Mayam	Tamil	as himself
