= Archana Chandhoke =

Indian television host and actress

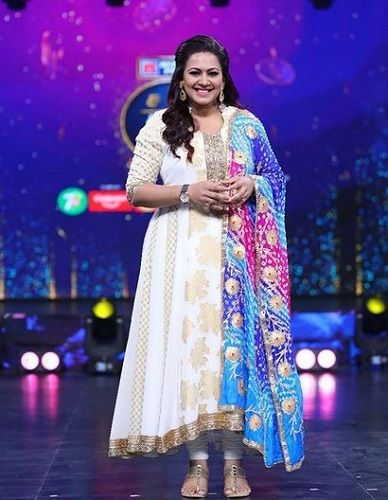
- Born: 2 July 1982 (age 44); Chennai, India
- Education: Ethiraj College for Women
- Occupations: Television host; Actress; Radio Jockey
- Years active: 1992–present
- Spouse: Vineet Muthukrishnan (m. 2004)
- Children: Zaara Vineet

YouTube information
- Years active: 2020– Present
- Subscribers: 1.23 million
- Views: 620 million
- Last updated: 18 July 2026

Archana Chandhoke (born 2 July 1982), more simply known as Archana, is an Indian television presenter, actress, and radio jockey who has primarily worked in Tamil film and television industry.

== Career ==
=== Television ===
In September 1999 Chandhoke started her career as a newsreader in Jaya TV's English News while studying in college. She later moved on to Sun TV, where she hosted the shows Comedy Time and Ilamai Pudhumai. In May 2007, she left Sun TV to prioritize family commitments.

After a break of one year she joined Star Vijay in 2008 and hosted Namma Veetu Kalyanam till 2014. In September 2015, Zee Tamil approached her to do the show Athirshta Lakshmi. The following year, she appeared as a judge of the comedy show Junior Super Star along with K. Bhagyaraj and Khushbu.

In 2020 Archana entered Bigg Boss as a wildcard contestant. She received criticism from audiences for her behavior on the show. Following her stint on the show, she rejoined Star Vijay and is hosting various reality shows and also various special episodes like Kadhale Kadhale, Old is Gold Black and White, Parivattam, Namma veetu kalyanam Snehan and Kanikka Special, Singappene, Namma veetu thiruvizha, Samsaram athu Minsaram, Sabash Sariyana Potti, Pattikada Pattanama, Thai illamal Naanillai and Udanpirappe(Paasa Malargal).

In 2022 she rejoined Zee Tamil to host the most popular show, Super Mom season 3. She is hosting this show along with her daughter Zaara Vineet.

=== Films ===
Chandhoke has also worked as an actress in Tamil-language films, often portraying comedy roles. She first appeared in En Vazhi Thani Vazhi (2015), an action film starring and produced by businessman R. K. During the audio release function of the film, she was confronted by actor Radharavi on stage, who felt she failed to address him with respect. R. K. then cast her again in his next film, Vaigai Express (2017) in another small role.

Her appearance in Yenda Thalaiyila Yenna Vekkala (2018) saw her feature as a cheating wife in love with the character portrayed by Yogi Babu. A reviewer noted the scenes were "high on adult content but manages to evoke a smile". She was seen in Doctor (2021), where she featured alongside her daughter Zaara in a supporting role.

== Filmography ==
| Year | Title | Role | Notes |
|---|---|---|---|
| 2015 | En Vazhi Thani Vazhi | Unknown | Uncredited Role |
| 2017 | Vaigai Express | Anuradha | |
| 2018 | Yenda Thalaiyila Yenna Vekkala | Thaara | |
| 2019 | Aadai | Voice Over | |
| 2020 | Naan Sirithal | Anchor Archana | Special Appearance |
| 2021 | Doctor | Sumathi | |
| 2025 | Madras Matinee | Priya | |
| 2025 | Mask | Thaen | |
| 2026 | John Doe | Chandru's mother | |

== Television ==
=== Television Host ===
| Year | Name | Network | Language | Notes |
|---|---|---|---|---|
| 2000–2007 | Comedy Time | Sun TV | Tamil | |
| 2007 | Ilamai Pudhumai | Sun TV | Tamil | |
| 2008 | Kalakka Povathu Yaaru | Star Vijay | Tamil | |
| 2008–2014 | Namma Veetu Kalyanam | Star Vijay | Tamil | |
| 2013 | Veedu Manaivi Makkal | Kalaignar | Tamil | |
| 2014 | Celebrity Kitchen | Puthuyugam | Tamil | |
| 2015–2018 | Athirsta Lakshmi Season 1 | Zee Tamil | Tamil | |
| 2016–2018 | Sa Re Ga Ma Pa Lil Champs Season 1 & 2 | Zee Tamil | Tamil | |
| 2017–2019 | Sa Re Ga Ma Pa Seniors Season 1 & 2 | Zee Tamil | Tamil | |
| 2018–2019 | Super Mom Season 1 & 2 | Zee Tamil | Tamil | With Zaara Vineet |
| 2021 | Parivattam – 6th Annual Vijay Television Awards | Star Vijay | Tamil | Prelude Show |
| 2021 | Old is gold | Star Vijay | Tamil | Special show |
| 2021 | Kadhale Kadhale | Star Vijay | Tamil | Special show |
| 2021 | Namma Veetu Kalyanam | Star Vijay | Tamil | Special show |
| 2021 | Mr and Mrs Chinnathirai Season 3 | Star Vijay | Tamil | |
| 2021 | Super Daddy | Star Vijay | Tamil | Episode 4 and 5 |
| 2022 | Bigg Boss (Tamil season 5) Kondattam | Star Vijay | Tamil | |
| 2022 | Podungamma Vote uh Enga serial Paathu - 7th Annual Vijay Television Awards | Star Vijay | Tamil | Prelude Show |
| 2022 | Kalakka Povathu Yaaru? Champions 3 | Star Vijay | Tamil | Judge |
| 2022 | Super Mom 3 | Zee Tamil | Tamil | With Zaara Vineet |
| 2022 | Sa Re Ga Ma Pa Seniors Season 3 | Zee Tamil | Tamil | |
| 2024 | Sa Re Ga Ma Pa Seniors 4 | Zee Tamil | Tamil | |
| 2024 | Sa Re Ga Ma Pa Li'l Champs 4 | Zee Tamil | Tamil | |
| 2025-present | Sa Re Ga Ma Pa Seniors season 5 | Zee Tamil | Tamil | |

=== Reality shows ===
| Year | Show | Role | Network | Notes |
|---|---|---|---|---|
| 2016 | Genes Season 1 | Participant | Zee Tamil | With Aravind |
| 2017–2019 | Junior Super Star (Season 1 & 2) | Judge | Zee Tamil | |
| 2018 | Genes Season 2 | Participant | Zee Tamil | With Zaara Vineet & Anita Chandhoke |
| 2020–2021 | Bigg Boss Tamil Season 4 | Contestant (Wild Card Entry) | Star Vijay | Evicted Day 10- 77 |
| 2021 | Bigg Boss Tamil Season 4 Kondattam | Herself | Star Vijay | Special Show; Along With Zaara Vineet |
| 2021 | Start Music Season 2 | Participant | Star Vijay | BB4 Special |
| 2021 | Neeya Naana | Guest | Star Vijay | Kids Vs Parents Episode (S23 E189) |
| 2022 | KPY Champions Season 3 – Doubles | Judge | Star Vijay | |
| 2022 | Oo Solriya Oo Oohm Solriya | Participant | Star Vijay | |
| 2023 | Tamizha Tamizha Season 3 | Guest | Zee Tamil | S3 Episode 2 |

=== Televisions serials ===
| | Serial | Network | Language | Notes |
|---|---|---|---|---|
| 2019 | Sembaruthi | Zee Tamil | Tamil | Cameo Appearance as Herself |
| 2019 | Yaaradi Nee Mohini | Zee Tamil | Tamil | Cameo Appearance as Herself |
| 2021 | Bharathi Kannamma | Star Vijay | Tamil | Cameo Appearance as Herself |
| 2022 | Thavamai Thavamirundhu | Zee Tamil | Tamil | Cameo Appearance as Herself |

=== Radio ===
| Year | Show | Role | Network | Notes |
|---|---|---|---|---|
| 2021–present | Hi Chennai With Achuma | Radio Jockey | Radio Mirchi | Morning Show |

=== YouTube ===
| Year | Channel | Role | Language | Notes |
|---|---|---|---|---|
| 2020–present | Wow Life | Creator | Tamil | Own Lifestyle Channel |
| 2020 | Smile Settai | Host | Tamil | Super star E-Awards (Virtual Award show) |
| 2021 | Aval Vikatan | Host | Tamil | Aval Awards 2020 |
| 2021 | Cine Ulagam | Host | Tamil | Manidhi Vaa (Special Show For Achieved Women) |
| 2022 | BehindwoodsTV | Host | Tamil | Marakka Mudiyatha Kalyanam |
| 2022 | Mirchi Tamil(Official YouTube channel of Radio Mirchi Tamil) | Host | Tamil | One Minute please(Public Interview Program) |

=== Presenter ===
| Year | Show | Network | Role | Notes |
|---|---|---|---|---|
| 1999 | News | Jaya TV | News Reader | Presenter for English News |

=== Award Shows and Live Shows ===
| Year | Show | Role | Network | Notes |
|---|---|---|---|---|
| 2016 | Sa Re Ga Ma Pa Lil Champs Season 1 Grand Finale | Host | Zee Tamil | Live Show |
| 2017 | Dance Jodi Dance Season 1 Grand Finale | Host | Zee Tamil | Live Show |
| 2017 | Sa Re Ga Ma Pa Seniors Season 1 Grand Finale | Host | Zee Tamil | Live Show |
| 2018 | Sa Re Ga Ma Pa Lil Champs Season 2 Grand Finale | Host | Zee Tamil | Live Show |
| 2018 | 1st Galatta Nakshathra Awards | Host | Zee Tamil | Award Show |
| 2018 | 1st JFW Movie Awards | Host | Zee Tamil | Award Show |
| 2018 | 1st Zee Tamil Kudumbam Viruthugal | Host | Zee Tamil | Award Show |
| 2019 | 2nd Zee Tamil Kudumbam Viruthugal | Host | Zee Tamil | Award Show |
| 2020 | 1st Zee Cine Awards | Host | Zee Tamil | Award Show |
| 2021 | Mirchi Music Awards | Host | Star Vijay | Award Show |
| 2022 | Mirchi Music Awards South | Host | Star Vijay | Award Show |
| 2022 | 7th Annual Vijay Television Awards | Host | Star Vijay | Award Show |
| 2022 | Homepreneur Awards / சுயசக்தி விருதுகள் (5th Season) | Host | Colors Tamil | Award Show |
| 2023 | Zee Tamil Kudumba Viruthugal 2022 | Host | Zee Tamil | Award Show |

== Awards and nominations ==
=== Television Awards ===
| Year | Honouring Body | Category | Outcome |
|---|---|---|---|
| 2018 | Galatta Nakshatra Awards | Best Anchor | Nominated |
| 2019 | Galatta Nakshatra Awards | Best Anchor | Nominated |
| 2019 | Galatta Nakshatra Awards | Sensational Anchor | Won |
| 2019 | Anandha Vikatan Awards | Best Anchor | Won |
| 2018 | Zee Tamil Kudumbam Viruthugal | Best Anchor- Female | Won |
| 2018 | Zee Tamil Kudumbam Viruthugal | Best Duo Anchor (Along With Deepak Dinkar) | Nominated |
| 2018 | Zee Tamil Kudumbam Viruthugal | Favourite Anchor | Won |
| 2019 | Zee Tamil Kudumbam Viruthugal | Favourite Anchor | Won |
| 2019 | Zee Tamil Kudumbam Viruthugal | Best Anchor | Nominated |
| 2020 | Behindwood Gold Medal Awards | Best Anchor – Television | Won |
| 2020 | Zee Tamil Kudumbam Viruthugal | Favourite Anchor | Nominated |
| 2020 | BlackSheep Digital Awards | Star Family Entertainer For Wow Life (Along with Zaara Vineet & Anita Chandhoke) | Won |
| 2022 | Realistic Awards | Inspiring Icon & Contribution To Media | Won |
| 2022 | Stree Sakthi Awards | Best Anchor | Won |
| 2022 | Vijay Television Awards | Best Anchor | Nominated |
| 2022 | Zee Tamil Kudumbam Viruthugal | Best Anchor | Nominated |
| 2023 | Zee Tamil Kudumbam Viruthugal | Best Entertainer of The Year | Won |
| 2024 | Zee Tamil Kudumbam Viruthugal | Best Anchor | |
| 2025 | Zee Tamil Kudumbam Viruthugal | Entertainer of The Year | |

=== Film Awards ===
| Year | Artist/Work | Honouring Body | Category | Outcome |
|---|---|---|---|---|
| 2022 | Doctor | Edison Awards | Best Supporting Actress | Won |
| 2022 | Doctor | JFW – Just For Women Movie Awards | Best Supporting Actress | Won |
