= Puvi Arasu =

Tamil television actor

Puviarasu Muthusamy
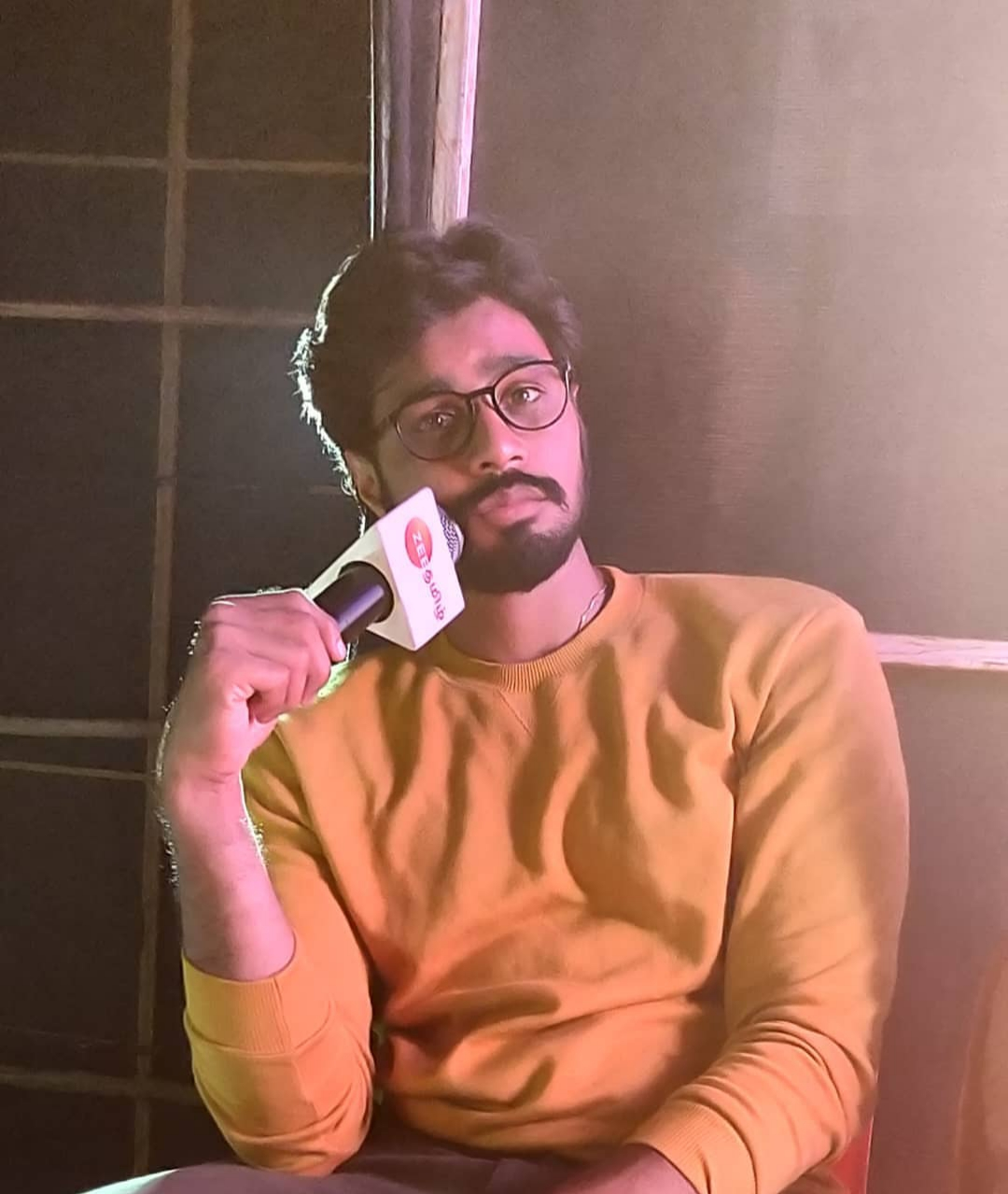
- Candid Click of Puvi in Zee Natchathira Kondattam
- Other names: Puvi, Puviarasu
- Education: M.E (structural)
- Occupations: Actor, dancer, choreographer, athlete
- Years active: 2012–present
- Spouse: MohanaPriya (m.2021-present)
- Children: 1

Puviarasu Muthusamy or Puvi is an Indian television actor, dancer and national level athlete. He debuted in the seventh season of Maanada Mayilada in 2012 and starred in reality shows, films, short films and other television series. He is best known for playing the lead roles in serials EMI (2016), Lakshmi Vanthachu (2017), and Azhagiya Tamil Magal (2017), Oru Oorla Oru Rajakumari (2019), Oru Oorla Rendu Rajakumari. Currently, he is playing the lead role in the serial Vidhya No.1

== Career ==
He debuted in the Tamil television dance reality show Maanada Mayilada season 7 in Kalaignar TV along with Anusha and hosted by Sanjeev and Keerthi in 2012. They were 2nd runner up.

In 2013 he participated in the Telugu dance show Style. In the finale, he broke his leg in his 2nd performance and left the finale. After this, he started to act in a television serial Keladi Kanmani (2015) in Sun TV. Puvi had a supporting role in Thamarai (2016) serial along with Neelima Rani. He appeared in other Tamil serials such as EMI (2016), Vaani Rani (2016) and Vinnaithaandi Varuvaayaa (2016). He has acted in Aakki, along with Anu Hassan and Mahendran.

=== 2017–present ===
In 2017, he appeared in Lakshmi Vanthachu (2017) alongside Vani Bhojan. He participated in the reality risky dance show Dancing Khilladies along with Preetha Suresh. The pair won the contest. The same year, he starred in his first leading role in Zee Tamil serial Azhagiya Tamil Magal serial along with Sheela Rajkumar He participated in Zee Dance League for Azhagiya Tamil Magal. He is participating in Dance Jodi Dance (season 2) along with Pavithra Datta. In between he left from Dance Jodi Dance (season 2) because of his leg fracture. Puvi replaced the role of Iniyan in Vidhya No.1 He is voted has one of the most desirable men on Television 2018 by Times of India. He married Mohanapriya on 22 February 2021.

== Television ==
=== Television series ===
Year	Title	Role	Channel	Notes
2015	Keladi Kanmani	Prakash	Sun TV	
2016	Thamarai	Dr.Sakkarai	Sun TV	
2016	EMI-Thavanai Murai Vazhkai	Raghav	Sun TV	
2016	Vani Rani	Shakthi	Sun TV	
2016	Vinnaithaandi Varuvaayaa	Prasad	Vijay TV	
2017	Lakshmi Vanthachu	Puvi	Zee Tamil	
2017–2019	Azhagiya Tamil Magal	Jeeva Nantham / Jeeva	Zee Tamil	
2019–2021	Oru Oorla Oru Rajakumari	Iniyan	Zee Tamil	
2021	Sathya Season 1	Iniyan	Zee Tamil	Special Appearance
2021	Sembaruthi	Iniyan	Zee Tamil	Special Appearance
2021	Yaaradi Nee Mohini	Iniyan	Zee Tamil	Special Appearance
2021	Sathya Season 2	Iniyan	Zee Tamil	Special Appearance
2021-2022	Oru Oorla Rendu Rajakumari	Iniyan	Zee Tamil	
2022 – 2024	Vidhya No.1	Sanjay	Zee Tamil	
2023	Amudhavum Annalakshmiyum	Sanjay	Zee Tamil	Special Appearance
2023	Idhayam	Vaasu	Zee Tamil	Special Appearance
2026	Thirumangalyam	Alex	Zee Tamil	Special Appearance
11 October 2026-Present	Mass pasanga VS Class ponnunga	Herself	Zee Tamil	Participant

== Reality shows ==
Year	Title	Role		Notes
2012	Maanada Mayilada season 7	Contestant	Kalaingar TV	Reality Dance Show; 2nd Runner-up
2013	Style	Contestant	Star Vijay	Reality Dance Show; Finalist
2017	Dancing Khilladies	Contestant	Zee Tamil	Reality Dance Show; Winner
2017	Zee Dance League	Contestant	Zee Tamil	Reality Dance Show; Finalist; participated For Azhagiya Tamil Magal Team
2017	Nanbenda	Participant	Zee Tamil	
2017	Dance Jodi Dance Season 2	Contestant	Zee Tamil	Reality Dance Show; Celebrity Dancer
2024	Mr. and Mrs. Chinnathirai	Contestant	Star Vijay	Reality Couples Show; winner (Season 5)

== Awards and nominations ==
Year	Award	Category	Program	Result
2018	Zee Tamil Kudumbam Viruthugal	Most Promising Actor- Male	Azhagiya Tamil Magal	Won
2018	Zee Tamil Kudumbam Viruthugal	Best Actor	Azhagiya Tamil Magal	Nominated
2019	Zee Tamil Kudumbam Viruthugal	Best Pair (Along With Ashwani)	Ooru Oorula Ooru Rajakumari	Won
2019	Zee Tamil Kudumbam Viruthugal	Favourite Pair	Ooru Oorula Ooru Rajakumari	Nominated
2019	Zee Tamil Kudumbam Viruthugal	Best Actor	Ooru Oorula Ooru Rajakumari	Nominated
2019	Zee Tamil Kudumbam Viruthugal	Favourite Hero	Ooru Oorula Ooru Rajakumari	Nominated
2020	Zee Tamil Kudumbam Viruthugal	Best Pair (Along With Ashwani)	Ooru Oorula Ooru Rajakumari	Won
2020	Zee Tamil Kudumbam Viruthugal	Favourite Pair	Ooru Oorula Ooru Rajakumari	Nominated
2020	Zee Tamil Kudumbam Viruthugal	Best Actor	Ooru Oorula Ooru Rajakumari	Nominated
2020	Zee Tamil Kudumbam Viruthugal	Favourite Hero	Ooru Oorula Ooru Rajakumari	Nominated
2022	Zee Tamil Kudambam Viruthugal	Most Popular Pair (Along With Tejashwini Gowda)	Vidya No1	Won
2022	Zee Tamil Kudambam Viruthugal	Best Pair	Vidya No1	Nominated
2022	Zee Tamil Kudambam Viruthugal	Favourite Pair	Vidya No1	Nominated
2022	Zee Tamil Kudambam Viruthugal	Best Actor	Vidya No1	Nominated
2022	Zee Tamil Kudambam Viruthugal	Favourite Hero	Vidya No1	Nominated
2023	Zee Tamil Kudambam Viruthugal	Most Popular Pair (Along With Tejashwini Gowda)	Vidya No1	Won
