= Ayesha Zeenath =

Indian actress

Aysha Zeenath
- Born: Ayshath Zeenath Beevi; 6 June 1997 (age 29); Kasaragod, Kerala, India
- Other name: Ayesha
- Education: M.O.P. Vaishnav College For Women, Chennai
- Occupation: Actress
- Years active: 2017–present

Ayshath Zeenath Beevi (born 6 June 1997) is an Indian actress who primarily appears in Tamil language films and TV series. She began her TV career in Tamil through Ponmagal Vanthal in 2018. She later appeared in the TV serial Sathya.

== Career ==
She appeared as Sathya, a tomboy, opposite Vishnu as a lead in Sathya (TV series) 2019 - 2021 and Sathya season 2 a sequel from 2021 - 2022 in Zee Tamil. The serial and the pair became critically acclaimed and liked among fans and viewers. It also gained her a massive popularity and won several awards for the role. Meanwhile, she was appeared as a contestant in the fashion-reality show Super Queen which also aired on Zee Tamil in 2021 where she emerged as the 2nd runner up of the show. Then she participated in Star Vijay reality show Bigg Boss Tamil Season 6 2022 and evicted on the day of 63. Then she played the main lead opposite Nikhil Maliyakkal in Oorvasivo Rakshasivo as Durga/Vaishnavi which aired on Star maa in 2023 - 2024. Meanwhile, she participated in the same channel's show Kiraack Boys Khiladi Girls season 1 behalf of girls team and ended up as Runner-up. Later, she appeared on Disney+Hotstar series as Advocate Chinmayi in Uppu Puli Kaaram a remake of the Korean series My Father is Strange in 2024.

== In the media ==
In 2020, Ayesha was ranked sixth by The Times of India in its listing of "10 most desirable women of Tamil television".

== Television ==
Year	Title	Role	Channel	Language	Notes
2017	Ready Steady Po Season 1	Contestant	Star Vijay	Tamil	2 Episodes
2018	Maya	Rani Lakshmi Prabhavati & Darshini	Sun TV	Tamil	Replaced Shwetha Hegde
2018	Ponmagal Vanthal	Rohini Selvam	Star Vijay	Tamil	Replaced by Meghna Vincent
2018	Enkitta Modhaadhe Season 1	Herself / Participant	Star Vijay	Tamil	Along with Ponmagal Vandhaal Team
2019–2020	Savitramma Gari Abbayi	Nandhini	Star Maa	Telugu	
2019–2021	Sathya Season 1	Sathya (Rowdy Baby)	Zee Tamil	Tamil	
2020	Raja Magal	Sathya	Zee Tamil	Tamil	Special appearance
2021	Sembaruthi	Goddess Meenakshi	Zee Tamil	Tamil	Cameo
2021	Super Queen	Contestant	Zee Tamil	Tamil	2nd Runner-up
2021–2022	Sathya Season 2	Sathya (Rowdy Baby) & Nithya	Zee Tamil	Tamil	
2022	Ninaithale Inikkum (Kadhal Sangamam)	Sathya	Zee Tamil	Tamil	Cameo
2022	Thavamai Thavamirundhu	Sathya	Zee Tamil	Tamil	Cameo
2022–2023	Bigg Boss Season 6 – Tamil	Contestant	Star Vijay	Tamil	Evicted Day 63; 12th Place
2023	Oo Solriya Oo Oohm Solriya	Contestant	Star Vijay	Tamil	
2023	Bigg Boss Kondattam	Herself	Star Vijay	Tamil	
2023	Idhayam	Sathya	Zee tamil	Tamil	Cameo
2023-2024	Oorvasivo Rakshasivo	Durga	Star Maa	Telugu	Main lead
2024	Start Music season 5	Herself / Participant	Star Vijay	Tamil	
29 June 2024	Kirrack Boys Khiladi Girls	Herself / Participant	Star Maa	Telugu	
15 September 2024	Samayal Express	Anchor	Zee Tamil	Tamil	
12 October 2025	Bigg Boss Telugu 9	Contestant	Star Maa	Telugu	Wildcard Entry Walked Day 47
11 October 2026 - Present	Mass pasanga VS Class ponnunga	Herself / Participant	Zee Tamil	Tamil	

== Filmography ==
=== Films ===
Year	Title	Role	Language	Notes
2025	Rambo	Sadha	Tamil	
2026	Dr. Bennat	TBA	Malayalam	
2026	Lawyer	TBA	Tamil	Filming
2026	Moi Virundhu	TBA	Tamil	Filming

=== Web Series ===
Year	Title	Role	Language	Notes
2024	Uppu Puli Kaaram	Chinmayi	Tamil	Remake of Korean Drama My Father Is Strange
2025	Thaara	Thaara	Tamil	

=== Short film ===
Year	Title	Role	Language	Notes
2022	Thaaiku Pin Tharaam	Swathi	Tamil	
2023	The Path		Tamil	
2025	Madras Malar	Vaibhavi	Malayalam	

=== Independent singles ===
Year	Title	Language	Notes
2021	Thaaiku Pin Tharaam	Tamil	
2023	Ponnu Paarka Porom	Tamil	
2025	Kan Kaalagamal	Tamil	
2025	Kaadhal Kasakuthaiyya	Tamil	

== Awards ==
Year	Award	Category	Show	Outcome	Notes
2019	Zee Tamil Kudumbam Viruthugal 2019	Best Actress	Sathya season 1	Won	
2019	Zee Tamil Kudumbam Viruthugal 2019	Favourite Heroine	Sathya season 1	Nominated	
2019	Zee Tamil Kudumbam Viruthugal 2019	Best On- Screen Pair	Sathya season 1	Won	
2019	Zee Tamil Kudumbam Viruthugal 2019	Favourite On- Screen Pair	Sathya season 1	Nominated	
