= Vishnu (TV actor) =

Indian television actor

Vishnu Vijay
- Born: Vishnu Vijay; 17 September 1988 (age 37)
- Education: M.Sc. (Electronic Media)
- Occupation: Actor
- Years active: 2011–present
- Known for: Office (2013-2015); Sathya (2019-2021); Sathya 2 (2021-2022); Bigg Boss 7 Tamil
- Website: Vishnu on Instagram

Vishnu is an Indian television actor. After making a breakthrough as an actor through his role in Office (2013), he has worked on films including Mapla Singam (2016), Ivan Yarendru Therikiratha (2017) and Kalari (2018). In 2023, he participated in Bigg Boss 7 and became the 4th runner-up.

== Career ==
He made his breakthrough as an actor with his role as Vishnuvardhan in the television series, Office, co-starring Karthik and Shruthi Raj. Vishnu made his debut as an actor in films through supporting roles in Mapla Singam (2016), an action film starring Vimal and Anjali. His first film as the lead actor, Ivan Yarendru Therikiratha (2017), had a delayed release and failed to garner attention at the box office as a result of other high-profile releases. The film was a comedy about a man who was born on Valentine's Day finding it difficult to get a lover and saw him appear alongside actresses Ishaara Nair and Varsha Bollamma.

His forthcoming releases are Kalari alongside actor Krishna and Sivappu Seval, in both of which he portrays negative roles. He participated as a contestant in Bigg Boss 7 and became the 4th runner-up.

== Filmography ==
=== Television Serials ===
| Year | Title | Role | Channel | Notes |
|---|---|---|---|---|
| 2011–2012 | Kana Kaanum Kaalangal Kallooriyin Kadhai | Ashokan "Ashok" | STAR Vijay | Debut Series |
| 2013–2015 | Office | Vishnu Vardhan "Vishnu" | STAR Vijay | Main Lead |
| 2019–2021 | Sathya Season 1 | Prabhu Shanmuga Sundaram "Prabhu" (Amul Baby) | Zee Tamil | Main Lead |
| 2021–2022 | Sathya Season 2 | Prabhu Shanmuga Sundaram "Prabhu" (Amul Baby) | Zee Tamil | Main Lead |
| 2022 | Idhu Solla Marandha Kadhai | Arjun | Colors Tamil | Main Lead |

=== Television shows ===
| Year | Title | Channel | Role | Notes |
|---|---|---|---|---|
| 2015 | Kitchen Super Stars Season 3 | STAR Vijay | Contestant | |
| 2023 | Takkar Takkar | Zee Tamil | Participant | |
| 2023–2024 | Bigg Boss 7 | STAR Vijay | Contestant | 4th runner-up |
| 2024 | Anda Ka Kasam | STAR Vijay | Participant | |
| 2024 | Bigg Boss Kondattam Season 7 | STAR Vijay | Himself | |
| 2024 | Aalum Puthushu Aathamum Puthushu | STAR Vijay | Himself | |
| 2024 | Pandigai Palagaram Are U Ready | STAR Vijay | Participant | |
| 2024 | Bigg Boss Unlimited | Vijay Super | Himself | |
| 2024 | Bigg Boss 8 | Star Vijay | Guest | |

=== Web Series ===
| Year | Title | Role | Channel |
|---|---|---|---|
| 2023 | Vera Maari Office | Joshua Ashirwatham (Joe) | Aha Tamil |

=== Album Song ===
| Year | Title | Role | Language | Notes |
|---|---|---|---|---|
| 2025 | Butterfly | | Tamil | |

=== Special Appearance ===
| Year | Programme | Channels | Notes |
|---|---|---|---|
| 2013 | Diwali Special Programme | Star Vijay | as Vishnu Vardhan |
| 2019 | Genes | Zee Tamil | as Prabhu Shanmuga Sundaram (Amul Baby) |
| 2019 | Petarap | Zee Tamil | as Prabhu Shanmuga Sundaram (Amul Baby) |
| 2019 | Zee Play School | Zee Tamil | as Prabhu Shanmuga Sundaram (Amul Baby) |
| 2019 | Jil Jung Juk | Zee Tamil | as Prabhu Shanmuga Sundaram (Amul Baby) |
| 2019 | Chemistry Class | Zee Tamil | as Prabhu Shanmuga Sundaram (Amul Baby) |
| 2019; 2021 | Oru Oorla Oru Rajakumari | Zee Tamil | as Prabhu Shanmuga Sundaram (Amul Baby) |
| 2020 | Namma Vettu Pongal | Zee Tamil | as Prabhu Shanmuga Sundaram (Amul Baby) |
| 2020 | Comedy Gangsters | Zee Tamil | as Prabhu Shanmuga Sundaram (Amul Baby) |
| 2020 | Zee Super Family | Zee Tamil | as Prabhu Shanmuga Sundaram (Amul Baby) |
| 2020 | Raja Magal | Zee Tamil | as Prabhu Shanmuga Sundaram (Amul Baby) |
| 2021 | Moi Virundhu | Zee Tamil | as Prabhu Shanmuga Sundaram (Amul Baby) |
| 2021 | Master D Blaster | Zee Tamil | as Prabhu Shanmuga Sundaram (Amul Baby) |
| 2021 | Romeo Juliet | Zee Tamil | as Prabhu Shanmuga Sundaram (Amul Baby) |
| 2021 | Gethu Seniors Khiladi Juniors | Zee Tamil | Anchor (Special Programme) |
| 2021 | Kana Kaanaum Kaalagal Reunion | STAR Vijay | as Ashok |
| 2022 | Ninaithale Inikkum "Kadhal Sangamam" (Sunday Special Episode) (13.2.2022)) | Zee Tamil | as prabhu |
| 2022 | Pudhu Pudhu Arthangal (Climax Episode) | Zee Tamil | as Sanjay |
| 2023 | Rajini "Rajni reunion" (Sunday Special Episode) (26.3.2023) | Zee Tamil | as Vishnu |

=== Films ===
| Year | Film | Role | Notes |
|---|---|---|---|
| 2016 | Mapla Singam | Sathish | |
| 2017 | Ivan Yarendru Therikiratha | Arivu | Lead |
| 2018 | 6 Athiyayam | Subramani | Segment: Soup Boy Subramani |
| 2018 | Kalari | Anwar | |
| 2019 | Gorilla | Ramaiah's Son | |
| TBA | Sivappu Seval | TBA | Filming |

=== Award and nominations ===
| Year | Award | Category | Show | Role | Result | Channel |
|---|---|---|---|---|---|---|
| 2014 | Vijay Television Awards | Favourite Find | Office | Vishu Vardhan | Nominated | Star Vijay |
| 2014 | Vijay Television Awards | Favourite Comedian - Fiction | Office | Vishu Vardhan | Won | Star Vijay |
| 2019 | Zee Tamil Kudumbam Viruthugal 2019 | Best Actor - Male | Sathya | Prabhu Shanmuga Sundaram (Amul Baby) | Won | Zee Tamil |
| 2019 | Zee Tamil Kudumbam Viruthugal 2019 | Favourite On- Screen Pair | Sathya | Prabhu Shanmuga Sundaram (Amul Baby) along with Ayesha | Won | Zee Tamil |
| 2019 | Zee Tamil Kudumbam Viruthugal 2019 | Best On- Screen Pair | Sathya | Prabhu Shanmuga Sundaram (Amul Baby) along with Ayesha | Nominated | Zee Tamil |
| 2019 | Zee Tamil Kudumbam Viruthugal 2019 | Favourite Hero | Sathya | Prabhu Shanmuga Sundaram (Amul Baby) | Nominated | Zee Tamil |
| 2020 | Zee Tamil Kudumbam Viruthugal 2020 | Favourite Hero | Sathya | Prabhu Shanmuga Sundaram (Amul Baby) | Nominated | Zee Tamil |
| 2020 | Zee Tamil Kudumbam Viruthugal 2020 | Best Actor- Male | Sathya | Prabhu Shanmuga Sundaram (Amul Baby) | Nominated | Zee Tamil |
| 2020 | Zee Tamil Kudumbam Viruthugal 2020 | Favourite On-Screen Pair | Sathya | Prabhu Shanmuga Sundaram (Amul Baby) along with Ayesha | Nominated | Zee Tamil |
| 2020 | Zee Tamil Kudumbam Viruthugal 2020 | Best On-Screen Pair | Sathya | Prabhu Shanmuga Sundaram (Amul Baby) along with Ayesha | Nominated | Zee Tamil |
