= Saranya Sasi =

Indian actress (1986–2021)

- Born: 1986; Pazhayangadi, Kerala, India
- Died: 9 August 2021 (aged 35); Thiruvananthapuram, Kerala, India
- Occupation: Actress
- Years active: 2003–2018
- Spouse: Binu Xavier (m. 2014)
- Parent: Geetha

Saranya Sasi (1986 – 9 August 2021) was an Indian actress who worked in Malayalam and Tamil films and television soap operas. She had maintained a good bond in her lifetime with Seema G Nair

== Early life ==
Sharanya completed her class 6th to 8th from Jawahar Navodaya Vidyalaya, Kannur.She did her graduation in English literature from Calicut University.

== Career ==
She started her career in 2006 in Sooryodayam, a serial directed by Balachandra Menon which was aired on Doordarshan. She made her film debut in Malayalam in Chacko Randaaman (2006) and in Tamil in Pachai Engira Kaathu (2012). During her career, Saranya acted in Malayalam films such as Chotta Mumbai (2007), Ali Bhai (2007), Thalappavu (2008), Bombay March 12 (2011) and Annmariya Kalippilaanu (2016). She also acted in popular television soap operas such as Swami Ayyappan, Kootukari, Rahasyam, Harichandanam, Avakashikal, Malakhamar and Karuthamuthu.

== Personal life ==
Saranya married Binu Xavier in November 2014 but later they divorced.

== Illness and death ==
In 2012, Sharanya was diagnosed with a malignant brain tumor, which didn't allow her to continue her acting career. In May 2021, she got hospitalized for COVID-19, which aggravated her health.

She took her last breath on 9 Aug 2021, while admitted at a private hospital in Trivandrum.Sharanya's health condition became worsened due to COVID-19 complexities, in her final days.

== Filmography ==
Year	Title	Role	Language	Notes
2005	Maanikyan	Chandralekha	Malayalam	
2006	Chacko Randaaman	Anna	Malayalam	
2007	Chotta Mumbai	Sherin	Malayalam	
2007	Ali Bhai	Kingini's sister	Malayalam	
2008	Thalappavu	Bindhu	Malayalam	
2009	Muthu Muthu Shehanai	Lover	Malayalam	Album
2009	Fathima Beevi	Lead	Malayalam	Album
2011	Aazhakadal	Dancer	Malayalam	
2011	Bombay March 12	Amina	Malayalam	
2011	The Heart	Mom	Malayalam	Album
2012	Pachai Engira Kaathu	Tamilselvi & Muthuselvi	Tamil	Double role Credited as Devadai
2016	Rareeram	Mother	Malayalam	Album
2016	Annmariya Kalippilaanu	Teacher	Malayalam	

== Television ==
Year	Title	Channel	Role	Language	Notes
2003	Suryodayam	Doordarshan		Malayalam	Debut Malayalam serial
2003	Agnisakshi	Doordarshan		Malayalam	
2004	Mythili	Doordarshan Podhigai	Mythili	Tamil	Debut Tamil serial
2005	Ee Thanalil	Surya TV		Malayalam	
2005	Radhamadhavam	Surya TV		Malayalam	
2006	Manthrakodi	Asianet		Malayalam	
2006	Swami Ayyappan	Asianet	Vedavathy	Malayalam	
2006–07	Kayamkulam Kochunni	Surya TV		Malayalam	
2008	Sree Mahabhagavatham	Asianet	Avanthika	Malayalam	
2008	Kanakkuyil	Asianet	Sindhoori	Malayalam	
2008–09	Koottukari	Surya TV	Soorya	Malayalam	
2009	Bhamini Tholkkarilla	Asianet	Renu	Malayalam	
2009–10	Rahasyam	Asianet	Bhama	Malayalam	
2010–12	Harichandanam	Asianet	Bhama Mahadevan	Malayalam	
2010	Swami Ayyappan Saranam	Asianet	Maharani Gouri	Malayalam	
2010	Badhra	Surya TV	Annmary	Malayalam	
2011	Swamiye Saranamayyappa	Surya TV		Malayalam	
2011	Sarigama	Asianet	Participant	Malayalam	
2011–12	Avakashikal	Surya TV	Anjali	Malayalam	
2012	Kanalppoovu	Jeevan TV	Amrutha	Malayalam	
2012	Malakhamar	Mazhavil Manorama		Malayalam	
2012	Swathi	Gemini TV	Swathi	Telugu	Debut Telugu serial
2013	Deivam Thandha Veedu	Star Vijay	Seetha Ram Chakravarthy	Tamil	Replaced by Meghna vincent
2013	Varthaprabhatham	Asianet News	Guest speaker	Malayalam	
2014	Ithakukal; Ruchi	Asianet News	Guest speaker Judge	Malayalam	
2014–15	Karuthamuthu	Asianet	Kanya	Malayalam	Replaced by Lekshmi Priya
2015–16	Manasa Maina	Kairali TV	Manasa	Malayalam	Replaced. by Angel Mariya
2016	Mizhineerpookkal	Kairali TV	Manasa	Malayalam	Re-run
2016	Smart Show	Flowers TV	Participant	Malayalam	
2017	Malayali Darbar	Amrita TV	Guest panelist	Malayalam	
2018	Super Jodi	Surya TV	Contestant	Malayalam	Reality show
2018	Seetha	Flowers	Vaidehi	Malayalam	
2020	Pularvela	Manorama News	Guest speaker	Malayalam	
2021	CityLights - Sharanya's Vlog	YouTube	Presenter	Malayalam	
