= Raja (Tamil actor) =

Indian actor and businessman (born 1965)

- Born: Daggubati Venkatesh; 16 September 1964 (age 62)
- Occupation: Actor
- Years active: 1981–2000; 2019–present
- Relatives: D. Ramanaidu (uncle); Venkatesh (cousin)

Daggubati Venkatesh, credited as Raja and Daggubati Raja, is an Indian actor turned businessman who has acted in Tamil and Telugu language films. The actor made his debut in the 1981 Tamil film, Paakku Vethalai, before going on to become a leading actor in the Tamil film industry from 1986 to 2000.

He went on to play second lead roles and supporting characters in several films including Kamal Haasan's Sathi Leelavathi and Rajinikanth's Mappillai. He has also acted in few Telugu films like Chinnari Sneham, Sankellu and Shri Krishnarjuna Vijayam.

He is a relative of veteran film producer late D. Ramanaidu and the cousin of Venkatesh.

== Career ==
A nephew of Telugu film producer D. Ramanaidu, Daggubati Venkatesh was persuaded by his family to become an actor in Tamil cinema owing to his familiarity with Madras. He subsequently joined Bharathiraja's acting school, where he trained before getting his first major career breakthrough with the director's romantic drama Kadalora Kavithaigal (1986). To differentiate from his namesake cousin, Venkatesh was given the screen name "Raja". The box office success of Kadalora Kavithaigal prompted Bharathiraja to cast him again in Vedham Pudhithu (1987), and the popular song "Kannukkul Nooru" earned Raja a large female fanbase.

Raja continued portraying supporting roles in films, and was unable to garner much success as a lead actor. His appearance in a negative role in his collaboration with Manivannan for Ini Oru Suthanthiram was well received by critics, though his best known work in the late 1980s and early 1990s featured him in supporting roles such as in Mappillai (1989) and Pudhu Vasantham (1990). In the early 1990s, he was often typecast in soft, demure characters often portraying a gentle romantic, who regularly lost out to film's lead actor. His most notable films of the period, Sathi Leelavathi (1995), Love Birds (1996) and Kadhal Kottai (1996) all featured him in similar roles. He quickly became disheartened at the films and secondary characters being offered to him, and opted to move into business in 1999. and currently runs a granite business called "Cosmo Granites" in Chennai.

After nineteen years break from films, Raja returned to acting with a role in Krish's biopic drama N.T.R: Kathanayakudu (2019), where he portrayed the supporting role of Trivikrama Rao. He made his return to Tamil films through Adithya Varma (2019), where he appeared as the father of the titular character played by debutant Dhruv Vikram.

== Filmography ==
=== Tamil films ===
Year	Film	Role	Notes
1981	Paakku Vethalai		
1981	Chinna Mul Peria Mul	Anand	
1981	Nenjile Thunivirunthal		
1982	Kanne Radha	Nataraj	
1984	Veetuku Oru Kannagi		
1986	Kadalora Kavithaigal	Lawrence	
1986	Pudhiya Poovidhu		
1986	Neethana Antha Kuyil		
1987	Valayal Satham		
1987	Ini Oru Sudhanthiram		
1987	Gramatthu Minnal		
1987	Vedham Pudhithu	Sundarapandi	
1988	Neruppu Nila	Mohan	
1988	Ithu Engal Neethi		
1988	Uzhaithu Vaazha Vendum	Raja	
1989	Manidhan Marivittan		
1989	Mappillai		
1990	Vaazhkai Chakkaram	Thangavelu's brother	
1990	Ooru Vittu Ooru Vanthu	Dinesh	
1990	Adhisaya Manithan	Ramani	
1990	Pudhu Vasantham	Raja	
1990	Nangal Puthiyavargal	Raja	Guest appearance
1990	Sathyam Sivam Sundaram		
1990	Engitta Mothathay		Guest appearance
1991	Vaa Arugil Vaa	Ramakrishnan	
1991	Karpoora Mullai	Dr. Srinivas	
1991	Onnum Theriyatha Papa		
1991	Nee Pathi Naan Pathi		
1992	Kizhakku Velathachu		
1993	Captain Magal	Kalyan Kumar	
1993	Uthama Raasa	Marudhu	
1993	Moondravadhu Kann	Sundar	
1993	Enga Muthalali	Balu	
1994	Priyanka	Raja	Guest appearance
1994	Karuththamma	Stephen	
1995	Coolie		
1995	Sathi Leelavathi	Raja	Guest appearance
1995	Kolangal	Rajesh	
1995	Ayudha Poojai	Samiyappan's son	
1996	Love Birds	Mano	
1996	Vaikarai Pookkal	Raja	
1996	Meendum Savithri	Vasudevan	
1996	Rajali		Guest appearance
1996	Kadhal Kottai	Jeeva	
1996	Andha Naal	Vincent Babu	
1997	Bharathi Kannamma	Village officer	
1997	Arunachalam	Saravanan	
1997	Pudhalvan		
1998	Iniyavale	Raja	
1998	Kondattam	Gopikrishna	
1998	Sivappu Nila	Raja	
2000	Kannukku Kannaga	Arun	
2019	Adithya Varma	Vasudevan Varma	
2025	Nesippaya	Varadharajan	

=== Telugu films ===
Year	Film	Role	Notes
1987	Dongodochadu		
1987	Aadade Aadharam		
1988	Siripuram Chinnodu		
1988	Jhansi Rani	Dinakar	
1988	Sankellu		
1989	Chinnari Sneham	Suryam	
1989	Aakhari Kshanam		
1991	Stuvartpuram Dongalu	Viji	
1991	Edu Kondalaswamy		
1996	Sri Krishnarjuna Vijayam	Karna	
1997	Ratra Yatra		
2019	N.T.R: Kathanayakudu	N. Trivikrama Rao	
2019	N.T.R: Mahanayakudu	N. Trivikrama Rao	
2021	FCUK: Father Chitti Umaa Kaarthik	Umaa's father	
2023	Skanda	Bhaskar's father	

=== Other language films ===
Year	Film	Role	Language	Notes
1988	Agni Kanye	Mohan	Kannada	
1991	Ente Sooryaputhrikku		Malayalam	Guest appearance
1994	Sukham Sukhakaram		Malayalam	
