= Sathya 2 =

Indian television soap opera

- Genre: Drama
- Written by: Dialogues; M. Pazhanisami
- Screenplay by: SK.Raja; Sakthivel; Sarkunam Pungaraj; R.Saravanan
- Directed by: A.R. Karthik (1 - 113); S.N. Rajkumar (114 - 173); A.R. Karthik (174 - 303)
- Starring: Ayesha Zeenath; Vishnu
- Theme music composer: Vishal Chandrasekar
- Composer: Sekar Sai Bharath
- Country of origin: India
- Original language: Tamil
- No. of episodes: 303

Production
- Producers: Anil Sundar; Gugan Manohar
- Editor: Dhinesh Prakash
- Camera setup: Multi-camera
- Running time: 22 minutes
- Production company: Rajammal Creations

Original release
- Network: Zee Tamil
- Release: 25 October 2021 – 9 October 2022

Related
- Sathya

Sathya 2 is a 2021 Indian Tamil television drama, starring Ayesha Zeenath in a dual role with Vishnu in the lead roles. It aired from 25 October 2021 to 9 October 2022 on Zee Tamil and streamed on ZEE5 digital platform. It is a sequel series of Sathya.

The series premiered along with Oru Oorla Rendu Rajakumari, by ending their first seasons on 24 October 2021 and starting the second seasons on the next day 25 October 2021.

== Synopsis ==
Prabhu banishes Sathya from house blaming her as the cause for the abortion, but the truth is that, Prabhu brutally hit Sathya by his car, that caused the abortion (though Prabhu is unaware of this, and Sathya hide this truth).

=== 5 years later ===
Prabhu returns from Mumbai. He meets Sathya's lookalike, Nithya. Soon, He meets Sathya and ignores her due to misunderstanding. Eventually, Prabhu finds the truth about Sathya's abortion and regrets his deeds. Thus, Sathya and Prabhu reunite and remarry.

Later, Sathya joins to police force as a S.I officer with Prabhu's help. Prabhu's aunts, Nirmala and Devika try to separate them, but in vain. The area's former MLA, Gajendran tries to create riots for become next MLA, but Sathya foils his plan, leading to start a rivalry between them. Gajendran puts Prabhu jailed on false charges. Sathya bails Prabhu out and nominates his name for MLA election with Gajendran.

Prabhu wins the election and becomes MLA, making Gajendra furious. Sathya reveals her pregnancy to Prabhu, delighting him. To celebrate Prabhu's victory, she organizes a feast. Gajendran, along with his henchmens' Rohan and Mani, plots to kill Sathya during the feast. However, Nithya learns about their plan, comes in Sathya's disguise and sacrifices her life. Shattered, Sathya burns Gajendran, Rohan and Mani to death.

=== 5 years later ===
Sathya and Prabhu lead a happy life with their daughter, who is named after Nithya. Jr. Nithya is also brave like Sathya. Sathya is about to be promoted as a commissioner and expresses her gratitude towards Nithya for her sacrifice. The series ends in a happy note.

== Cast ==
=== Main ===
- Ayesha Zeenath as
  - S.I Sathya a.k.a. Rowdy Baby – A tomboy mechanic turned Sub-Inspector; Janaki and Vadivelu's younger daughter; Divya's sister; Prabhu's wife; Jr. Nithya's mother. (2021–2022)
  - Nithya – Sathya's look-alike; Annam's second daughter; Mullai and Amala's sister. (Dead) (2021-2022)
- Vishnu as Prabhu a.k.a. Amul Baby – A business tycoon turned MLA; Shanmugasundaram and Indumathi's younger son; Vignesh and Anita's brother; Divya's ex-fiancé; Sathya's husband; Jr. Nithya's father. (2021–2022)

=== Recurring ===
- Sandhya Dhaiyan as Sowmya – Sadhasivam and Nirmala's daughter; Saravanan's sister; Kathir's wife; Ammu's mother. (2021–2022)
- Anbalaya Prabhakaran as Shanmugasundaram – Sadhasivam's brother; Indhumathi's widower; Vignesh, Anitha and Prabhu's father; Jr. Nithya's grandfather. (2021–2022)
- Yuvashree as Indhumathi – Shanthi Devi and Devika's sister; Shanmugasundaram's wife; Vignesh, Anitha and Prabhu's mother; Jr. Nithya's grandmother (Dead) (2022)
- Ravishankar as Sadhasivam – Shanmugam's brother; Nirmala's husband; Saravanan and Soumya's father; Ammu's grandfather (2021–2022)
- Visalakshi Manikandan as Nirmala Sadhasivam – Prabhu's aunt; Sadhasivam's wife; Saravanan and Sowmya's mother; Ammu's grandmother (2021–2022)
- Aarthi Ramkumar as Devika – Indhumathi and Devika's sister; Prabhu's aunt (2021–2022)
- Sujatha Panju as Shanthi Devi – Indhumathi and Devika's sister; Prabhu's aunt (2022)
- Sasha Safa as Ammu – Soumya and Kathir's daughter (2022)
- Sadhishkumar as Makhan – Sathya's friend (2021–2022)
- Giri as Papaali – Sathya's friend (2021–2022)
- Rajesh as Panaimandai – Sathya's friend (2021–2022)
- Sirish as Thakkali – Sathya's friend (2021–2022)
- Deva Dharshini as Thangamshree – Police Constable (2022)
- Britto as Sendharaman a.k.a. Jackie Chan – Prabhu's personal assistant (2021–2022)
- Rekha Suresh as Annam – Mullai, Nithya and Amala's mother (2021)
- Auditor Sridhar as Mullai, Nithya and Amala's grandfather (2021)
- Swetha Senthikumar as Amala – Annam's youngest daughter; Mullai and Nithya's sister (2021)
- Hema Dayal as Mullai – Annam's eldest daughter; Nithya and Amala's sister (2021)
- Magima as Gnanam – Rangan's wife; Kaniyappan's mother; Sathya's aunt (2021)
- Ramesh Kumar as Rangan – Gnanam's husband; Kaniyappan's father; Sathya's uncle (2021)
- Joshua Suresh as Kanniyappan – Gnanam and Rangan's son; Sathya's cousin (2021)
- Tirupur Rajesh as Prabhu's driver (2021)
- Dhanam as Selvi – Shanti Devi's Assistant (2022)

=== Cameo ===
- Amit Bhargav as Abhinav Janardhan
- Keerthana Podhuval as Hasini Janardhan
- K. Natraj as Rangan's father; Kanniyappan's grandfather
- Ajay Rathnam as (kusthi) vadhiyar, training for sathya
- Rachitha Mahalakshmi

== Special episode ==
- On 19 December 2021, this series held a two-hour special episode as Meendum Oru Kadhal Kadhai on Sunday.
- On 13 February 2022, Sathya 2 with Ninaithale Inikkum and Sembaruthi series's main leads joined for a special episode as Kadhal Sangamam, which is aired for non-stop two and half hours on Sunday.
