= Chithiram Pesuthadi (2021 TV series) =

Indian Tamil-language soap opera

- Genre: Drama
- Screenplay by: Sabarinathan
- Directed by: Kavitha Bharathy
- Starring: Deepika Rangaraju; Shiv Sathish; Baboos Baburaj
- Theme music composer: Praveen M
- Composers: Vishal Chandrasekar (Title Track)
- Country of origin: India
- Original language: Tamil
- No. of seasons: 1
- No. of episodes: 477

Production
- Producer: Kanya Bharathi
- Cinematography: Anand Murali
- Camera setup: Multi-camera
- Running time: 20-25 minutes
- Production company: Nilaa Dreamz

Original release
- Network: Zee Tamil
- Release: 19 April 2021 – 12 November 2022

Chithiram Pesuthadi (transl. The Picture Speaks) is an Indian Tamil-language television drama that airs on Zee Tamil and streams on ZEE5. It premiered on 19 April 2021 and ended on 12 November 2022. The series stars Deepika Rangaraju in the lead with Shiv Sathish and Baboos Baburaj. It is about a social drama, which deals with issues like gender bias and female infanticide.

== Synopsis ==
Gomathi had three daughters Malar, Kayal and Thangamayil. Her husband Gurumoorthy, a corrupt police officer left them, has they had three daughter and he desires a son. Thangamayil who aims to become an IPS officer to make her father Gurumoorthy to appreciate her. Jeeva, a rich background man falls in love with Thangamayil and they both married with the support of Jeeva's family and they hid the marriage from Thangamayil's family. Gurumoorthy slowly become a good man and feels for his mistakes and he loved his daughter Thangamayil. But Gomathi refuses Gurumoorthy.

The story mainly focus on how Thangamayil will become an IPS officer and how will she unite their parents.

== Cast ==
=== Main ===
- Deepika Rangaraju as Thangamayil
  - A village girl, who aims to become an IPS officer. She is Gurumoorthy and Gomathi's last daughter, Malar and Kayal's younger sister, Jeeva's love interest and wife, now she was a police constable. (2021–2022)
- Shiv Sathish as Jeeva
  - A rich man, who takes the life very easier, He is Rajashekar and Bhavani's second son, Thangamayil's husband. (2021–2022)
- Baboos Baburaj as Gurumoorthy (Sundaram)
  - A Police Inspector, who wish to want a boy child but his fate, he had three girl children Malar, Kayal and Thangamayil. So he left his wife Gomathi alone with the daughters. (2021–2022)

=== Recurring ===
- Jayashree / Caroline Hiltrud as Gomathi (Susila)
  - Malar, Kayal and Thangamayil's mother; Gurumoorthy's first wife (2021–2022)
- Sherin Janu / Navya Narayanan as Malar
  - Kayal and Thangamayil's elder sister; Gurumoorthy and Gomathi's first daughter; Gopi's wife (2021–2022)
- Abinavya / Hema Dayal as Kayal
  - Malar and Thangamayil's sister; Gurumoorthy and Gomathi's second daughter. (2021–2022)
- Madhan as Vetri
  - Gurumoorthy's and Kasturi's son (2021–2022)
- Kiranmai Kannan as Manimegalai
  - A police constable and Thangamayil's friend (2022)
- Iyappan as Gopi
  - Gayathri and Madhuvanthi's elder brother; Malar's husband (2021–2022)
- Pooja Ramky as Thenu
  - Thangamayil's friend (2021–2022)
- Visalakshi Manikandan / Kavyavarshini as Kasturi
  - Gurumoorthy's second wife (2021–2022)
- Feroz Khan as Kasi
  - Kasturi's brother (2022)
- Nathan Shyam as Ram
  - A Sub-inspector of police (2022)
- Ashok Pandian as Rajashekar
  - Karthik, Jeeva and Isai's father; Bhavani's husband (2021–2022)
- Dharani as Bhavani
  - Karthik, Jeeva and Isai's mother; Rajashekar's wife (2021–2022)
- Suveta as Madhuvanthi
  - Natrayan and Malliga's daughter; Gopi and Gayathri's younger sister (2021–2022)
- V. Dasarathy as Natrayan
  - Gopi, Gayathri and Madhuvanthi's father; Malliga's husband (2021–2022)
- Sheela / Aishwarya as Malliga
  - Gopi, Gayathri and Madhuvanthi's mother; Natrayan's wife (2021–2022)
- Swetha Subramanian as Gayathri
  - Gopi and Madhuvanthi's sister; Karthik's wife; Rajashekar and Bhavani's daughter-in-law (2021–2022)
- Anil Neredimilli as Karthik
  - Rajashekar and Bhavani's elder son; Jeeva and Isai's elder brother; Gayathri's husband (2021–2022)
- Sailalitha as Isai
  - Rajashekar and Bhavani's daughter; Karthik and Jeeva's younger sister (2021–2022)
- VJ Deepika Lakshmanapandian as Mahalakshmi
  - A thief (2022)
