= Maya (2018 TV series) =

2018 Indian television series

- Genre: Soap opera
- Written by: Sundar.C; Kalasekaram Narasimman (Dialogues)
- Screenplay by: Kalasekaram Narasimman; Amajath Manimegalai
- Directed by: Nandas
- Starring: Ajay; Ayesha; Nakshatra Srinivas
- Music by: C. Sathya; G.Clement; Pa.Vijay (Lyrics)
- Country of origin: India
- Original language: Tamil
- No. of seasons: 1
- No. of episodes: 87

Production
- Executive producer: A.Anbu Raja
- Producers: Sundar C Kushboo
- Production location: Chennai
- Cinematography: Gerold.A.Rajamannikam; Banu Murugan
- Editor: N.B.Srikanth Sutheef S
- Production company: Avni Telemedia

Original release
- Network: Sun TV
- Release: 9 July – 20 October 2018

Maya (transl. Invincible) is a 2018 Indian Tamil-language drama television series that aired on Sun TV from 9 July to 20 October 2018. The show starred Ajay, Ayesha and Nakshatra Srinivas. The series was directed by Nanda Kumar; Sundar C and his wife, actress Kushboo, were the producers.

== Cast ==
=== Main ===
- Ajay as Raja Vikraman and Aravind
  - King of Suryakundala Dynasty, a powerful monarch and warrior capable of killing many enemies single-handedly.
- Shwetha Hegde / Ayesha as Rani Lakshmi Prabhavathi and Darshini
  - Queen of Satavagheeni Dynasty and responsible in destroying Kalanthakan's body. Main heroine and Aravind's first wife (love marriage and a secret affair prior to Aravind's official marriage with Yaksha)
- Akansha Gandhi / Nakshatra Srinivas as Icchapurani Chakravarthini Rani Simharathna and Yakshini (Yaksha)
  - Queen of Icchapuri Dynasty and daughter of Mandagini, (Female antagonist - A powerful Warrior Queen who brought 27 kingdoms under her dominion and earned the title of Chakravarthini. Aravind's second wife (Brahma Thirumanam / married as per tradition)(main antagonist )
- Unknown as ichapuri rajaguru kalanthakan:a royal priest of ichapuri dynasty the real maya who will soon return to the world to fulfil and ancient phrophechy as a part of a boon that god had gifted him after his terrible defeat 2000 years ago in the hands of the devas(antagonist).

=== Supporting ===
- Sadiq as Ameer Baasha or Vaapa or Satavagheeni Padai Thalapathi Sultan Bhai (before 2000 years ago).
  - An Ayurvedic and Mystical art specialist who supports Darshini like her father for taking care and protecting her. 2000 years ago, he was a Supreme Commander of Satavagheeni Army. He is also a devotee of Allah.
- Vincent Asokan as Icchapuri Padai Thalapathi Rana Maayan and Aardhanaari
  - Supreme Commander of Icchapuri Army and responsible in betraying Kalanthakan. A devotee and son of Dhumavathi Devi, a Demi goddess.(antagonist)
- --- as Jyothiingam.
  - Former Chief Commander of Satavagheeni Army. Banished from Satavagheeni kingdom and cursed by Queen Lakshmi Prabhavathi due to his betrayal to her and her kingdom. A devotee of Lord Shiva and Bhavani Amman.
- --- as Shiva Acharya.
  - A devotee of Lord Shiva and helps Darshini with Home Minister for the sake of world.
- --- as Sugumadhapura and Kuyli (Tamil) or Swethasudha and Gayathri (Telugu).
  - A magical shape-shifting pigeon and apprentice of Jyothiingam. She helps Darshini with a following instructions given by Jyothiingam.
- Manobala as Bhadra
  - Rana Maayan's apprentice.
- 'Aranmanai Kili' Gayathri as Manthagini.
  - Yaksha's Mother.
- Yashika Aannand as Devathai Raagini
- A spirit that protects Aravind and Darshini from the danger of Ranamaayan's power.
- Kulappulli Leela as Alangariamma
  - Kalanthakan's mother knows black magic and is a devotee of Dandhini Devi an evil Demi goddess.
- Singamuthu as Constable.
  - Bhadra's friend.
- Ammu Ramachandran as Lavanya.
  - sister-in-law of Yaksha.
- Shyam as Subhash.
  - Yaksha's brother.
- Anitha Venkat as Girija.
  - Yaksha's aunt.
- Sonia as Varshinipriya
  - Girija's first daughter.
- Ameya Nair as Sandhiya
  - Girija's second daughter.
- Srinidhi Bhat as Nirmal.
  - Yaksha's ex-husband.
- --- as Jagan.
  - Nirmal's father.
- Mohan Sharma as Minister Thangapaandi.
- Mahanadi Shankar as Pasupathi (Saalappaa)
  - Alangariamma's loyal assistant.
- Divya Krishnan

== Dubbed versions/Reshot version ==
Language	Title	Original release	Network	Last aired
Tamil	Maya	9 July 2018	Sun TV	20 October 2018
Malayalam	Maya	9 July 2018	Surya TV	27 October 2018
Kannada	Maya	9 July 2018	Udaya TV-reshot version	2 November 2018
Telugu	Maya	9 July 2018	Gemini TV	9 November 2018
Bengali	Maya	26 August 2019	Sun Bangla	20 November 2019
Hindi	Maya	15 January 2025	Sun Neo	3 March 2025
