= Ente Sooryaputhrikku =

1991 Indian film

- Theatrical release poster
- Directed by: Fazil
- Written by: Fazil
- Produced by: Swargachitra Appachan
- Starring: Suresh Gopi; Amala; Srividya
- Cinematography: Anandakuttan
- Edited by: T. R. Shekar
- Music by: Ilaiyaraaja
- Production company: Swargachitra
- Distributed by: Swargachitra
- Release date: 10 April 1991
- Country: India
- Language: Malayalam

Ente Sooryaputhrikku (transl. For my Helio-daughter (Note: "Helio-daughter", literally suryaputhri/suryaputhra is a classical idiom in Malayalam and more broadly, Indian languages, to describe an illegitimate child, alluding to the epic character Karna of Mahabharata who born of Surya to an unwed Kunti)) is a 1991 Indian Malayalam-language drama film written and directed by Fazil. The film stars Suresh Gopi, Amala, and Srividya. It was simultaneously shot in Tamil as Karpoora Mullai, with Raja replacing Gopi. The film's music was composed by Ilaiyaraaja.

The film was released on 10 April 1991.

== Plot ==
Maya (Amala) is a spirited and rebellious college student whose penchant for mischief often disrupts her campus and hostel life. In a bold attempt to humiliate a prominent physician, Dr. Srinivas (Suresh Gopi), she and her friends orchestrate a prank where she feigns illness and professes her love for him. The plan backfires when Srinivas harshly rebukes her, callously citing her status as an adopted child and questioning her lineage. Devastated by his elitist insults, Maya confronts her guardian and, in a moment of despair, attempts suicide. It is Srinivas himself who saves her life, an event that sparks a complex shift in their dynamic. As Srinivas begins to fall for the woman he once looked down upon, Maya remains haunted by her past. She refuses his proposal, vowing to uncover her true identity first. Her quest leads her to the celebrated singer K.S. Vasundhara Devi (Srividya). Though initially resistant, Vasundhara eventually acknowledges Maya as her daughter, though she remains guarded about the identity of Maya's father. The two share a brief, blissful period of reconciliation, and Vasundhara prepares to publicly claim Maya and bless her union with Srinivas. Tragedy strikes when Vasundhara's greedy staff, seeking to seize her wealth, orchestrate her murder. Maya and Srinivas arrive to find her in critical condition, but they are thwarted by the culprits and a dismissive police force. In a desperate bid for justice, Maya seeks help from her friend's father, Vinod Shankar (M. G. Soman). However, by the time they reach the house, Vasundhara has succumbed to her injuries. Pushed to the brink, Maya takes the law into her own hands, killing the murderers in a fit of righteous rage. In the aftermath, a shocking revelation emerges: Vinod Shankar is Maya's biological father, making her and her best friend half-sisters. Though she had never intended to disrupt his life, Maya finds a tragic sense of closure. As she is led away to face the legal consequences of her actions, Srinivas reaffirms his devotion. The story concludes with their symbolic marriage behind bars, a testament to a love that finally found its worth through sacrifice.

== Cast ==
- Suresh Gopi as Dr. Srinivas
- Amala as Maya Vinodhini (dubbed by Bhagyalakshmi)
- Srividya as Vasundhara Devi K. S
- M. G. Soman as Vinod Shankar
- Prathapachandran as Shiva Prasad
- Thikkurissy Sukumaran Nair
- Sumithra as Dr. Srinivas's mother
- Bheeman Raghu as Ravi
- T. S. Raghavendra as Balannan
- Suma Jayaram
- Kanya Bharathi
- Kalady Omana
- Fazil in a guest appearance
- Raja in a guest appearance

== Soundtrack ==
The successful and popular soundtrack was composed by Ilaiyaraja.

Track List

Song title	Singer(s)	Lyrics
"Rapadi Pakshikootam"	K. S. Chithra	Bichu Thirumala
"Aalapanam Thedum"	K. J. Yesudas, K. S. Chithra & P. Susheela	Bichu Thirumala
"Sree Siva"	P Leela	Ilaiyaraja
"Rakkolam"	K. S. Chithra	Kaithapram

== Awards ==
Kerala State Film Awards

- Best Dubbing Artist - Bhagyalakshmi

== Release ==
The film was a commercial success.
