= Deivam Thandha Veedu =

Indian Tamil-language soap opera

- Genre: Soap opera
- Screenplay by: S.Ashok Kumar
- Directed by: G. Jayakumar; Nagiya Suseendaran; So.Arulrasan; Susheel Mokashi; Ab.Nakkeran
- Starring: Sudha Chandran; Saranya Sasi; Meghna Vincent; Roopa Sree
- Opening theme: "Deivam Thandha Veedu"
- Country of origin: India
- Original language: Tamil
- No. of seasons: 2
- No. of episodes: 1000

Production
- Producer: Bhavachithra Jayakumar
- Cinematography: D.Ramesh
- Editors: M.Muthuganesh; Santhosh
- Camera setup: Multi-camera
- Running time: 22 minutes
- Production company: Ross Petal Entertainment Limited

Original release
- Network: Vijay TV
- Release: 15 July 2013 – 26 May 2017

Related
- Saath Nibhaana Saathiya

Deivam Thandha Veedu is a 2013 Indian Tamil-language soap opera initially starred Sudha Chandran and Saranya Sasi. But later Meghna Vincent (Replaced Saranya) and Roopa Sree (Replaced Sudha) with an ensemble supporting cast of Sravan Rajesh, Nisha, Venkat Renganathan, Kanya Bharathi and others.

It is an official remake of Hindi serial Saath Nibhana Saathiya on Star Plus. The plot revolves around cousins Seetha and Priya, who married into the Chakravarthy family.

== Premise ==
The show revolves around the Chakravarthy family, who just welcomed two daughter-in-laws, Seetha and Priya. It explores the morals and values of a typical joint family, and focuses on their life and the cousins' contrasting personalities.

== Plot ==
=== Season 1 ===
Banumathi and Sundaram adopt Sundaram's niece, Seetha, after her parents die. Seetha is illiterate, naive, kind and shy, while their daughter Priya is educated, outgoing, bubbly and cunning. Seetha and Priya are married into the Chakravarthy family. Seetha's mother-in-law, Chitradevi, who is strict and strong-minded, transforms Seetha into a confident and smart woman so that her son, Ram Kumar, accepts her.

Priya has numerous unsuccessful attempts to create difficulties for Seetha, but both cousins are happily accepted into their families by their spouses. Kalpana, Chitradevi's daughter, marries Charan, Priya's maternal cousin. Seetha finds her parents, who were presumed dead.

After the death of Vanitha's brother, Vanitha pretends to be mentally unstable so that Seetha takes her into the Chakravarthy household against the family's decision. Vanitha is Ram's ex-girlfriend. She contrives to expel Seetha from the Chakravarthy household and bring Ram into her life again.

Seetha is charged with the murder of Dinesh, while the real murderer is Charan, who is Seetha's brother and Kalpana's husband. Charan follows Seetha to Dinesh's house and sees Seetha take Dinesh's iPhone before he can upload Kalpana's inappropriate picture to the Internet. Once Seetha gets the phone, she runs away from the house, and Charan enters. Charan sees that Dinesh is not dead. Charan decides to kill Dinesh, and Seetha returns to the home to save Dinesh's life and sees her brother kill Dinesh.

Charan is sent to jail, and Banumathi plans to send a divorce notice to Kalpana without Charan's knowledge. After a few weeks, Charan is bailed out, and Banumathi finds a new match for Charan. Kalpana decides to commit suicide after learning this, and Charan meets with Kalpana to clear the misunderstanding. The situation sours when Vanitha plans to be Ram's wife. Vanitha conspires with the liftman and stops the lift for a half-hour so that she is with Ram. She begs Ram to tie the thali, which is used to declare a husband and wife in India, but Ram refuses. They are rescued by Seetha and Ravi, Priya's husband.

Chitra Devi plans to meet Pandithar to perform the pooja prayer ritual, to improve the life of Seetha and Ram. The pooja requires that Ram remarry Seetha. If the pooja is incomplete, Seetha's life would be in danger. After hearing this, Vanitha stops the pooja by showing her thali and accuses Ram of tying it, by showing an incomplete video clip. Seetha is angry and stops talking to Ram. Ram punishes himself in front of the goddess Amman to prove that he is not guilty and that he will never marry Vanitha. After seeing that, Seetha believes Ram, and the Chakravarthy family decides to chase Vanitha from the house. Vanitha edits CCTV footage to show that Ram is the one who tied her thali. Ram takes the pen drive from Vanitha and examines it at a graphics centre. Once he knew she was cheating, Ram asks Vanitha to come to his office terrace, and they argue. Vanitha pushes Ram off the patio.

Ram has temporary memory loss from a blood clot in his brain. He forgets the past three years, including his marriage to Seetha. Ram thinks that Vanitha is his wife, and believes that Seetha is hired by his mom to act as his wife. Ram refuses to be the managing director of their company due to his memory loss, and the Chakravarthy family decides to put Seetha in that position but is opposed by Priya. Priya has a degree and is a gold medalist in business administration at the district level. When the situation becomes critical, Chitradevi decides to have a competition between Seetha and Priya to see who is more capable of the position. Meanwhile, Vanitha tells Ram that Seetha wants to destroy their lives. She shows the evidence, goes to jail with Ram and makes him angry and have a negative opinion about Seetha. Vanitha hires Raghu, a cousin of Priya and Seetha, to help Priya with administration studies. Raghu agrees to teach Priya to win back his love towards her. Seetha notices his intention, and she tries to save Priya from getting involved in any problem.

Vanitha tries to manipulate Ram by asking him to kick Seetha out of the house. Chitra Devi brings Ram to her brother's house to celebrate the late Dinesh's birthday and tries to be intimate with Ram. She asks Seetha to tear Ram's and Vanitha's pictures from the photo album, and orders Vanitha to burn all the images by herself. Since the picture is the only evidence of her love for Ram, Vanitha tries to take revenge on Seetha by putting a knife under her pillow. When Seetha notices the knife, she wakes Ram to ask about it, but Ram misunderstands, screams and calls everyone in the house to accuse Seetha of attempting to murder him. On the next day, Vanitha asks Ram to log a complaint that Seetha is trying to kill him, resulting in Seetha willingly allowing herself to be arrested by the police. Chitra Devi and Ravi go to the police station to bring Seetha back home, and Ram sees her coming back.

Vanitha brings Ram to her brother's house and starts to threaten the Chakravarthy family. Vanitha asks Ram to fight for his part of the property from the Chakravarthy family, and Chitradevi writes the property in Seetha's name as per their family tradition. Ram can have the rights to the property if he stays together with Seetha. Banumathi has the idea of kidnapping Seetha's daughter, Harini. Ram goes to school and kidnaps Harini in front of Seetha, and asks Vanitha to handle the kid. Seetha and Chitradevi log a complaint against Ram and Vanitha and get back Harini by approval of the Child Court. Vanitha takes revenge by hiring two drug suppliers to act as sick people on the side of the road when Seetha in hot pink colored saree with fat navel started her car with her car keys tightly with expression and goes driving her car. Seetha feels pity for them and helps them get to the hospital, without realizing they placed drugs inside her car.Seetha in kindness and in sympathy, starts her car with her car keys and drives it fastly using her naked leg to push her car's accelerator tightly and fastly in front of Vanitha. Vanitha calls the police to arrest Seetha. The police chase Seetha's car, tells her to hand over her car keys as she does it slowly, find 2 kg of the heroin and arrest Seetha. Ravi is angry when he hears this and goes to Vanitha's house to beat her, involving Ram. Ravi accidentally pushes Ram from the staircase, hitting Ram's head.

Vanitha makes Ravi go to jail for hitting his brother. It makes Priya angry that Vanitha betrayed her. After a long time, Chakravarthy's old business partner Selvamani comes to reunite their partnership, but Chitradevi does not agree with the offer because he has cheated Chakravthy before. He offers to release Seetha from the drug charges. Without another option, the Chakravarthy family agrees, and Selvamani goes to Delhi to get Seetha released. While on the way home, Seetha sees the two culprits and starts to chase them, but they escape from her.

Seetha meets Vanitha because she knows that Vanitha is the one making her suffer in jail. Seetha warns Vanitha in front of Ram, which angers him. Seetha loses her patience, and slaps Vanitha in front of Ram, leaving him speechless. Vanitha is scared by Seetha's bold reaction and tries to separate from Ram and to escape before Seetha catches her for the drug crime. But Ram refuses to leave Vanitha and meets Seetha to ask her to sign the divorce paper. Seetha gets mad and shouts at Ram that she will not divorce him unless Ram agrees to undergo treatment. The divorce paper is torn into pieces by Chitradevi.

Priya follows her cousin Ragu to meet someone who has the political influence to bail out Ravi, but Ragu has bad intentions. Selvamani again meets Chitradevi to resume their partnership, which she agrees to because he helped bail out Seetha. Chitra Devi still seeks Selvamani's help to do the same for Ravi, but Seetha does not recognise as she knows Selvamani's intention. With no other option, Seetha agrees with the Chakravthy family's decision and continues the partnership with Selvamani. Chitra Devi goes to Vanitha's house and forcibly brings Ram to the hospital for treatment, but Ram manages to escape with the help of Vanitha. Chitra Devi beats Vanitha and searches for her son Ram, but she does not find him, and returns to her home, planning to knock down Vanitha. Vanitha moves with Ram to a new place so that Seetha and Chitradevi cannot find them. When Priya returns home, she is happy to see Ravi at home and thinks of Ragu's political friend who bailed him out. Seetha knows that Priya went out with Ragu by attending Ragu's call, and she warns Priya of Ragu's character. Priya, who never listens to Seetha, goes out to give treatment for Ragu for Ravi's bail. Ragu takes the opportunity to lock Priya in her house. Priya learns Ragu's true nature and waits for Seetha and Ravi to save her. While Seetha and Chitradevi go to the shop, they find out that Ram is ordering his favourite food there. Chitra Devi feeds payasam to Ram due to his birthday. Ram eats it without knowing that Chitradevi mixed sleeping pills in it. Once Ram falls asleep, Seetha drives her car with Seetha in driver seat with saree alongside him to the hospital for his final treatment. Vanitha, who realizes the disappearance of Ram, doubts Seetha and goes to her house to search for Ram. Vanitha is chased out by Chitradevi and Seetha and realizes the absence of Priya. At the same time, Ragu calls Seetha to let her know that he has kidnapped Priya and is going to marry her, and he challenges Seetha to save Priya. Ravi gets angry about this and asks Priya to solve the problem as she does not listen to Seetha's advice. After family members convince him, he agrees to meet Banumathi to rescue Priya. Chitra Devi asks Seetha to be with Ram because he is afraid Vanitha will meet him there. He switches off Banumathi's mobile phone when he sees Seetha is trying to call her many times to explain what happened to Priya. Ragu steals Banumathi's money without her knowledge and buys thali. Banumathi realizes this once she is on the way back home, asks the shop owner to play the CCTV footage, and is shocked when she sees Ragu stealing her money.

Chitra Devi finally meets Banumathi and explains everything about Priya and Ragu. While at the hospital, Ram recovers and recognizes Seetha and Harini. Seetha lets him know about the situation with Chitradevi, and Chitradevi asks Seetha to go to the temple and make Archana on Ram's name. Seetha allows Harini to take care of Ram and goes to the temple. Vanitha acts as a doctor, gives chocolate to Harini that makes her fall asleep, and tries to kidnap Ram from the hospital, but fails once Chitradevi and Sumithra arrive. Seetha sees Ragu's car outside of the temple, asks Ravi to come, and calls the police. Ragu escapes from the temple and seeks Vanitha's help to hide Priya. Vanitha asks him to bring Priya to her house. Once Priya regains consciousness, she realizes that Vanitha is the one involved in this matter, and tries to escape from them to get help from the police, but is blocked by Vanitha and Ragu.

=== Season 2 ===
Kasthuri, Chitra Devi's sister, is introduced as Ram's original mother, and Ram, Seetha and their children go with Kasthuri, leaving the Chakravarthi house.

== Cast ==
=== Main ===
- Sudha Chandran (2013 – 2015) as Chitradevi Chakravarthy.
  - Roopa Sree (2015 – 2017) as Chitradevi Chakravarthy
- Saranya Sasi (2013) as Seetha Ramkumar Chakravarthy.
  - Meghna Vincent (2013 – 2017) as Seetha Ramkumar Chakravarthy.
- Sravan Rajesh as Ramkumar Chakravarthy.
- Nisha as Priya Ravikumar Chakravarthy.
- Venkat Renganathan as Ravikumar Chakravarthy.

=== Recurring ===
- Kanya Bharathi as Bhanumathy Sundaram.
- Mohammed Azeem as Charan.
- Monica as Kalpana Charan.
- Nivisha Kingkon / Preethi Kumar as Vanitha.
- Murali Kumar as Sundaram.
- Devaraj as Devaraj Chakravarthy.
- Sulakshana as Sumitra Thyagaraj Chakravarthy.
- T. R. Omana as Annapoorani Chakravarthy.
- Suresh Krishnamoorthy as Thyagaraj Chakravarthy.
- Varshini Arza as Radha, Seetha's estranged sister.
- Ruthu as Kamala, Seetha's estranged mother.
- Malathi as Chitradevi's neighbour.
- Ayappan as Dinesh.
- Nivaasni Shyam as Harini Chakravarthy, Ram and Seetha's daughter.
  - Raksha Shyam as young Harini
- Master Udhay in a dual role as Navin Kumar Chakravarthy / Pravin Kumar Chakravarthy, Ravi and Priya's twin sons.
- Master Advik as Hariharan Chakravarthy, Ram and Seetha's son.
- Anitha Nair as Kasturi, Ram's biological mother.

== Adaptations ==
Language	Title	Original release	Network(s)	Last aired	Notes
Hindi	Saath Nibhaana Saathiya साथ निभाना साथिया	3 May 2010	StarPlus	23 July 2017	Original
Marathi	Pudhcha Paaul पुढचं पाऊल	2 May 2011	Star Pravah	30 June 2017	Remake
Tamil	Deivam Thandha Veedu தெய்வம் தந்த வீடு	15 July 2013	Star Vijay	26 May 2017	Remake
Malayalam	Chandanamazha ചന്ദനമഴ	3 February 2014	Asianet	9 December 2017	Remake
Bengali	Bodhuboron বধুবরন	19 August 2013	Star Jalsha	29 January 2017	Remake
Telugu	Intiki Deepam Illalu ఇంటికి దీపం ఇల్లాలు	8 March 2021	Star Maa	9 September 2023	Remake

== Awards and nominations ==
Year	Award	Category	Recipient	Role	Result
2014
2014	Vijay Television Awards	Favourite Fiction Series	Deivam Thandha Veedu - Team		Won
2014	Vijay Television Awards	Favourite Supporting Actor Female	Sudha Chandran	Chitradevi	Won
2014	Vijay Television Awards	Favourite Find	Meghna Vincent	Seetha	Nominated
2015	Vijay Television Awards	Favorite Marumagal	Meghna Vincent	Seetha	Won
2015	Vijay Television Awards	Favourite Mamiyar	Sudha Chandran	Chitradevi Devaraj	Won
2015	Vijay Television Awards	Favourite Actor Male	Rajesh	Ramkumar	Nominated
2015	Vijay Television Awards	Favourite Actor Female	Meghna Vincent	Seetha	Nominated
2015	Vijay Television Awards	Favourite Negative Role	Kanya	Bhanumathy	Won
2017	Vijay Television Awards	Favourite Mamiyar	Roopa Sree	Chitradevi Devaraj	Nominated
2017	Vijay Television Awards	Favourite Mother	Sulakshana	Sumitra Thyagaraj Chakravarthy	Nominated
2017	Vijay Television Awards	Favourite Family	Deivam Thandha Veedu Family		Nominated
2017	Vijay Television Awards	Favourite Negative Role	Kanya Bharathi	Bhanumathy Sundaram	Nominated
2017	Vijay Television Awards	Best Child Actor	Anto James		Nominated
2017	Vijay Television Awards	Favourite Supporting Actor Male	Venkat Renganathan	Ravikumar Chakravarthy	Nominated
2017	Vijay Television Awards	Favourite Supporting Actor Female	Nisha	Priya Ravikumar	Nominated
2017	Vijay Television Awards	Favourite Screen Pair	Sravan Rajesh & Meghna Vincent	Ramkumar & Seetha	Nominated
2017	Vijay Television Awards	Favourite Actor Male	Sravan Rajesh	Ramkumar	Nominated
2017	Vijay Television Awards	Favourite Actor Female	Meghna Vincent	Seetha Ramkumar	Nominated
2017	Vijay Television Awards	Best Director	Sushil Mokashi		Nominated
2017	Vijay Television Awards	Favourite Fiction Series	Deivam Thandha Veedu		Nominated
