= Mamangam (TV series) =

Television series

- Also known as: Mamankam
- മാമാങ്കം
- Genre: Drama, Soap Opera
- Written by: Vallikkode Vikraman
- Directed by: Krishnamoorthi
- Country of origin: India
- Original language: Malayalam
- No. of episodes: 148

Production
- Executive producers: Atma; V. C. Praveen; Baiju Gopal
- Producer: Gokulam Gopalan
- Production location: Trivandrum
- Camera setup: Multi-camera
- Running time: 22 minutes

Original release
- Network: Flowers
- Release: 18 September 2017 – 26 April 2018

Mamangam (English: Foul Play) is an Indian Malayalam television series which launched on Flowers on 18 September 2017 and aired till 26 April 2018. The show was one of biggest failures in television industry due to its plot, which was regarded as uninteresting.

Aishwarya Nair, Sajan Surya, Sarath Das, Amrutha, Beena Antony, Rekha Ratheesh, Boban Alummoodan & Meghna Vincent are main protagonists of the show.

== Cast ==
- Aishwarya Mithun Koroth as Archa
- Sajan Surya as Adv. Vishnu
- Sarath Das as Appu/Devakumar IPS
- Amrutha Varnan as Mridula
- GK Pillai as Mahadevan Thampi
- Souparnika Subash as Abhirami
- Beena Antony as Kanimangalath Kanakadurga
- Rekha Ratheesh as Manimangalath Neelambari
- Mahesh as Chandran
- Boban Alummoodan as Adv.Madhavan
- Archana Suseelan as Arundathi
- Adithyan Jayan
- Yathikumar as Balan
- Meghna Vincent as Karthika
- Gowri Krishnan as Menaka
- Angel Mariya Joseph as Anasooya
- Navya as Sukanya
- Alis Christy as Meera
- Krishna Prasad as Dr.Hari
- Subar as Abu
- Akhil as Aromal Madhavan
- Devi Chandana as Sathyavathi
- Kottayam Rasheed as Uthaman
- Senthil Kumar
- Leena Nair as Aswathy
- Jeeja Surendran as Jackie Chan
- Shruthy
- Sreekutty
- Jismy
- Kailasnath
- M. R. Gopakumar
- Poojappura Radhakrishnan
- KPAC Leelamani
- Sojan
- Lakshmi Sanal
- Uma Nair

== Airing History ==
Aired	Time
18 September 2017 - 29 December 2017	Monday - Saturday; 7:30PM IST
1 January 2018 -February	Monday - Friday; 10:00PM IST
February -March 2018	Monday - Saturday; 10 :30PM IST
March -April 2018	Monday - Friday; 11:00PM IST
