= Azhagiya Tamil Magal =

Indian Tamil-language TV series

- Genre: Soap opera
- Based on: Mutyala Muggu
- Written by: P. Mari Muthu
- Screenplay by: Koperuncholan
- Directed by: Kavitha Bharathy
- Starring: Sheela Rajkumar; Puvi Arasu; Subalakshmi Rangan; Anju Aravind; Sathya Sai
- Theme music composer: Vishal Chandrasekhar (Title Song); Jai Kishan (Background Score)
- Opening theme: "Kapadi Kapadi"
- Country of origin: India
- Original language: Tamil
- No. of episodes: 457

Production
- Producer: Kanya Bharathi
- Production location: Kodaikanal
- Cinematography: V. Kalyan; Sumee Baskaran (2nd unit)
- Editors: M. Muthu Kanesh; D. Prakash
- Camera setup: Multi-camera
- Running time: 22 minutes

Original release
- Network: Zee Tamil
- Release: 28 August 2017 – 14 June 2019

Azhagiya Tamil Magal is a 2017 Indian Tamil-language soap opera starring Sheela Rajkumar (who later replaced by Sathya Sai Krishnan), Puvi Arasu, Subalakshmi and Anju Aravind. It premiered on Zee Tamil on 28 August 2017. The show ended on 14 June 2019 after 457 episodes.

The story is of a village girl named Poongkodi, who is a kabaddi player. The game will change her life and take her to Chennai to fund her education and helps pursue her further studies.

== Synopsis ==
The show showcases the story of Poongkodi, a kabaddi and Bharatnatyam enthusiast, who dreams of excelling in the field of sports and pursues further studies. However, the bitter past of Poonkodi's mother prevents Poonkodi from excelling.

Poongkodi's teacher and her grandfather push her to participate in a kabaddi game that will change her life and take her to Chennai to fund her education and pursue higher studies. She is pulled down by her rival Deepika whom she later discovers is her half-sister. Poongkodi goes through various tiffs. Meanwhile, there is a love triangle between Deepika, Jeeva and Poongkodi. How will her life change after this truth is revealed and how it affects the entire family forms the crux of the story.

== Cast ==
=== Main ===
- Sheela Rajkumar (2017–2018) as Poongkodi
  - Sathya Sai Krishnan (2019) as Poongkodi (replacemed of Sheela Rajkumar)
- Puvi Arasu as Jeevanantham (Jeeva)
- Subalakshmi Rangan as Deepika (Poongkodi's half-sister)

=== Recurring ===
- Anju Aravind as Saroja (Poongkodi's mother)
  - Seetha Anil replaced Aravind in this role.
- Saakshi Siva
- Shari (Sadhana) as Rajamma (Deepika's grandmother)
- Sivaranjani as Seetha Devi (Deepika's mother)
- Usha Sai as Maarii
- Veena Venkatesh as Parvathy (Sethupathy first wife, Ravi's mother, Deepika's grandmother)
- Ashwin Kumar as Gowtham
- Kanya Bharathi as Maya (Jeeva's mother)
- Gopi as Raghavendran
- Divya Banu as Ananya
- Sam as Rasukutty
- Sai Gopi as Sethupathy (Parvathy and Rajamma's husband, Ravi's father, Poongkodi and Deepika's grandfather)

== Adaptations ==
Language	Title	Original release	Network	Last aired	Notes
Telugu	Mutyala Muggu ముత్యాల ముగ్గు	7 March 2016	Zee Telugu	22 August 2019	Original
Tamil	Azhagiya Tamil Magal அழகிய தமிழ் மகள்	28 August 2017	Zee Tamil	14 June 2019	Remake
Kannada	Kamali ಕಮಲಿ	28 May 2018	Zee Kannada	7 October 2022	Remake
Malayalam	Kabani കബനി	11 March 2019	Zee Keralam	27 March 2020	Remake
Hindi	Saru सरू	12 May 2025	Zee TV	28 June 2026	Remake
