= Meghna Vincent =

Indian actress

Meghna Vincent is an Indian film and television actress who appears in Malayalam and Tamil languages. She is known for her lead roles of Amrutha in Chandanamazha, Rohini in Ponmagal Vanthal and Seetha in Deivam Thandha Veedu.

== Career ==
Meghna made her television debut through Malayalam serial Swamiye Saranamayyappa. Later she appeared in a supporting role in serials like Mohakkadal, Indira, and Autograph. She played Sridevi in Malayalam film Parankimala, and Meghna in the Tamil film Kayal. She played the main female lead Seetha Ram Chakravarthy in the Tamil TV serial Deivam Thandha Veedu which aired on Vijay TV. It was one of the popular Tamil serials which ended in 992 episodes. In February 2014, she started playing the lead role of Amrutha in the Malayalam serial Chandanamazha in Asianet. She opted out of the serial in May 2017 post her marriage. Both the above serials were remakes of Saath Nibhaana Saathiya, a Hindi serial. She played the main role on ATMA's serial Mamangam. She then played lead roles in the Tamil serial Ponmagal Vanthal and the Malayalam show Mrs. Hitler.

== Filmography ==
=== Films ===
Year	Film	Role	Language	Notes	Ref.
2002	Krishna Paksha Kilikal	Dhanya	Malayalam	—N/a	
2012	Lorry Girl	Kani	Malayalam		
2012	Ezham Suryan	Gopika's sister	Malayalam	—N/a	
2014	Parankimala	Sridevi	Malayalam	—N/a	
2014	Kayal	Meghna	Tamil	—N/a	
2016	Darvinte Parinamam	Serial actress	Malayalam	Archive footage	—N/a

=== Television ===
TV series

Year	Title	Role	Channel	Language	Notes	Ref.
2010	Swamiye Saranamayyappa	Sugandhi	Surya TV	Malayalam	—N/a	
2010	Kunjiyammakku Anchu Makkalane	—N/a	Amrita TV	Malayalam	—N/a	—N/a
2010	Karunyam	—N/a	DD Malayalam	Malayalam	—N/a	—N/a
2010-2011	Autograph	Nancy	Asianet	Malayalam	—N/a	
2011	Akashadoothu	—N/a	Surya TV	Malayalam	—N/a	—N/a
2011–2012	Chakravakam	Maria	Surya TV	Malayalam	—N/a	
2011	Parinayam	—N/a	Mazhavil Manorama	Malayalam	—N/a	—N/a
2012	Vallarppadathamma	—N/a	Shalom TV	Malayalam	—N/a	—N/a
2012–2013	Mohakkadal	Shruthi	Surya TV	Malayalam	—N/a	
2013	Indira		Mazhavil Manorama	Malayalam	—N/a	
2013	Swargavathil	Malli	Jaihind TV	Malayalam	—N/a	
2013	Amala	Nayana	Mazhavil Manorama	Malayalam	—N/a	—N/a
2013–17	Deivam Thandha Veedu	Seetha Ram Chakravathy	Star Vijay	Tamil	Replaced Saranya Sasi	
2014–17	Chandanamazha	Amrutha Arjun Desai	Asianet	Malayalam	Replaced by Vindhuja Vikraman	
2017	Mamangam	Karthika	Flowers TV	Malayalam	—N/a	
2018	Avalum Naanum	Rohini Gowtham	Star Vijay	Tamil	Cameo appearance	—N/a
2018–2020	Ponmagal Vanthal	Rohini Gowtham	Star Vijay	Tamil	Replaced Ayesha Zeenath	
2020	Aksharathettu	Amrutha	Mazhavil Manorama	Malayalam	Cameo in promo	—N/a
2021–2023	Mrs. Hitler	Jyothirmayi Dev Krishna a.k.a. Jyothi	Zee Keralam	Malayalam	—N/a	
2021	Manam Pole Mangalyam	Jyothirmayi Dev Krishna a.k.a. Jyothi	Zee Keralam	Malayalam	Cameo in promo	—N/a
2022	Pranayavarnangal	Jyothirmayi Dev Krishna a.k.a. Jyothi	Zee Keralam	Malayalam	Guest	—N/a
2023- present	Hridayam	Devika	Surya TV	Malayalam		
2024	Prema Pooja	Devika	Surya TV	Malayalam	Cameo in promo	
2024- present	Santhwanam 2	Sreedevi	Asianet	Malayalam		
2025	Constable Manju	Devika	Surya TV	Malayalam	Special appearance	

==== Other shows ====
Year	Title	Role	Channel	Language	Notes	Ref.
2011	Nakshtradeepangal	Contestant	Kairali TV	Malayalam	—N/a	—N/a
2012	Hello Kerala Vision	Host	Kerala Vision	Malayalam	—N/a	—N/a
2013	Golden Couple	Guest	Jeevan TV	Malayalam	—N/a	—N/a
2013	Munch Stars	Contestant	Asianet	Malayalam	—N/a	—N/a
2014	Badai Bungalow	Guest	Asianet	Malayalam	Along with Roopa Sree	—N/a
2015	Don't Do Don't Do	Contestant	Asianet Plus	Malayalam	—N/a	—N/a
2015	Onamelam	Guest	Amrita TV	Malayalam	—N/a	—N/a
2016	Thiruvonapulari	Host	Asianet Plus	Malayalam	—N/a	—N/a
2016	Run Baby Run	Guest	—N/a	Malayalam	—N/a	—N/a
2016	Oh My God	Guest	Kaumudy TV	Malayalam	—N/a	—N/a
2017	Comedy Challenge	Guest	Asianet	Malayalam	—N/a	—N/a
2017	Ningalkkum Aakaam Kodeeshwaran	Guest	Asianet	Malayalam	—N/a	
2017	Tamaar Padaar	Participant	Flowers TV	Malayalam	—N/a	—N/a
2017	Comedy Stars (Season 2)	Guest	Asianet	Malayalam	Along with Vindhuja Vikraman	
2017	Annie's Kitchen	Guest	Amrita TV	Malayalam	Along with Dimple Rose	
2017	Onnum Onnum Moonu	Guest	Mazhavil Manorama	Malayalam	Along with Dimple Rose	
2017	Malayali Veettamma	Guest	Flowers TV	Malayalam	—N/a	—N/a
2017	Swayamvaram	Guest	Kaumudy TV	Malayalam	—N/a	—N/a
2017	Pachakavum Vachakavum	Presenter	Kairali TV	Malayalam	—N/a	—N/a
2017-18	Dance Jodi Dance 2.0	Contestant	Zee Tamil	Tamil	—N/a	
2017–18	Dare the Fear	Contestant	Asianet	Malayalam	—N/a	
2018	Jodi Fun Unlimited	Contestant	Vijay TV	Tamil	—N/a	
2018	Super Jodi	Contestant	Surya TV	Malayalam	—N/a	
2019	Laughing Villa	Guest	Surya TV	Malayalam	—N/a	—N/a
2019	Ennishtam	Herself	ACV	Malayalam	—N/a	—N/a
2021	Sa Re Ga Ma Pa Keralam	Guest	Zee Keralam	Malayalam	Along with team Mrs. Hitler	
2021	Let's Rock N Roll	Guest	Zee Keralam	Malayalam	—N/a	—N/a
2021	Njanum Entalum	Guest	Zee Keralam	Malayalam	—N/a	—N/a
2021	Zee Keralam Mahotsavam	Guest	Zee Keralam	Malayalam	—N/a	—N/a
2023	Start Music Aaradhyam Paadum	Contestant	Asianet	Malayalam	Along with team Chandanamazha	

== See also ==
- List of Indian film actresses
