= Ponmagal Vanthal (TV series) =

Indian television soap opera

- Genre: Soap opera
- Written by: Selva vadivel (dialogues) (episode 75–571)
- Screenplay by: Rasool - selva vadivel - George
- Directed by: Nambiraj (episodes 1–109); Rasool (episodes 110–280); N. Sundareswaran (episodes 281–400); Gopal; Shanmugam (episodes 400–571)
- Starring: Ayesha; Vicky Krish; Shanoor Sana Begum; Vandana Michael; Meghna Vincent
- Theme music composer: "Kula vilaka yetri vaikum Ponmagal Vandhalae" ) by Shreya Ghoshal and Vairamuthu (lyricist)
- Country of origin: India
- Original language: Tamil
- No. of seasons: 3
- No. of episodes: 571

Production
- Producer: Syed Anwar Ahmed
- Editor: R. Aravind Raj
- Camera setup: Multi-camera
- Running time: approx. 22–24 minutes per episode
- Production company: Syed Studios

Original release
- Network: Vijay TV HD
- Release: 26 February 2018 – 1 February 2020

Ponmagal Vanthal (transl. Goddess of Wealth Appeared) is a Tamil-language family soap opera series starring Meghna Vincent, Vicky Krish, Shanoor Sana and Vandana Michael. It began airing on 26 February 2018 and ended on 1 February 2020 for 571 episodes on Vijay TV, every Monday to Friday in an afternoon programming block called "Vijay Matinee Thodargal". Later the show was rescheduled to air Monday through Saturday. The series marks the debut Tamil-language television series for Ayesha of Kerala, who plays the lead role; however she was replaced by Meghna Vincent after episode 105. The series is directed by Gopal Shamugam.

== Synopsis ==
The story is about Rohini, who is loyal to her family. Under certain circumstances, she is forced to marry Gowtham, a man from a rich family. Rohini receives a dowry from her mother-in-law Rajeshwari, who tries to cause problems in her life.

== Cast ==
=== Main ===
- Ayesha / Meghna Vincent as Rohini Selvam Gautham – Maragatham and Selvam's second daughter; Kaveri and Swathi's sister; Gautam's wife
- Vicky Krish as Gautham Chakravarthy – Rajeshwari and Chakravarthy's younger son; Vishnu's brother; Priya's ex-fiancé; Rohini's husband
- Shanoor Sana as Rajeshwari Chakravarthy – Chakravarthy's wife; Vishnu and Gautam's mother
- Nisha Jagadeeswaran / Vandana Michael as Priya Vishnu – Minister and Pushpa's daughter; Gautam's ex-fiancée; Vishnu's ex-wife (Main Antagonist)

=== Supporting ===
- Dharini as Maragatham Selvam – Shanmugam's sister; Selvam's wife; Kaveri, Rohini and Swathi's mother
- Ravishankar as Selvam – Maragatham's husband; Kaveri, Rohini and Swathi's father
- Nathan Shyam as Vishnu Chakravarthy – Rajeshwari and Chakravarthy's elder son; Gautham's brother; Maya and Sartiha's ex-fiancé; Priya's ex-husband; Soumiya's husband
- Ramya Shankar / Archana Harish as Soumiya Vishnu – Vishnu's wife
- Devaraj as Chakravarthy – Rajeshwari's husband; Vishnu and Gautham's father
- Vijay Krishnaraj as Shanmugam – Maragatham's brother; Thamarai's husband; Ashok's father
- Yuvasree as Thamarai Shanmugam – Shanmugam's wife; Ashok's mother
- VJ Mounika / Swetha Venkat as Kaveri Selvam Ashok – Maragatham and Selvam's eldest daughter; Rohini and Swathi's sister; Ashok's wife
- Feroz Khan as Ashok Shamnugam – Shanmugam and Thamarai's son; Kaveri's husband
- Archana Kumar as Swathi Selvam – Maragatham and Selvam's youngest daughter; Kaveri and Rohini's sister
- Sangeetha as Thanam – Housekeeper
- Madhan as Sethu – Rohini's friend
- Mercy Leyal as Pushpa – Minister's wife; Priya's mother
- Ravi Varma as Minister – Pushpa's husband; Priya's father
- Priya Prince as Maya – Vishnu's ex-fiancée
- Akila as Saritha – Vishnu's ex-fiancée
- Sivaranjini as Malini – Priya's friend
- Vincent Roy as Sena
- Sindhu Shyam

== Controversy ==
Director Nambiraja was accused by Ayesha (the latter who earlier played Rohini) for misbehaving in the shooting spot. The problem was highlighted to the channel and Ayeesha was sacked from playing the lead role in the serial.
