= Chacko Randaaman =

- Directed by: Sunil Karyattukara
- Written by: Biju Devassi
- Produced by: Saji Nathyattu
- Starring: Kalabhavan Mani; Mohini; Jyothirmayi
- Cinematography: Jain Joseph
- Edited by: M. V. Sajan
- Music by: Sundar C. Babu
- Production company: Nanthyattu Films
- Distributed by: Nanthyattu Release
- Release date: 1 July 2006
- Country: India
- Language: Malayalam

Chacko Randaaman (transl. Chacko, the second) is a 2006 Indian Malayalam-language action film directed by Sunil Karyattukara, written by Biju Devassi, and produced by Saji Nanthyattu. It stars Kalabhavan Mani in a triple role as a son, father and grandfather along with Mohini and Jyothirmayi in lead roles. Music was scored by Sundar C. Babu with lyrics by Vayalar Sharath Chandra Varma.

== Cast ==
- Kalabhavan Mani in a triple role as:
  - Chacko Randaaman
  - Arakkalveetil Chacko Mathai (Ottachavittu Chacko)
  - Johnny Kutty
- Mohini as Saira Bhanu
- Jyothirmayi as Meenakshi
- Adithya as Karimbadam Gopi (Parunthu Gopi)
- Vijayaraghavan as Karimbadam Devanarayanan (Devanji)
- Bheeman Raghu as Chengkannan Rajan
- Harisree Ashokan as Usman
- Baburaj as Karimbadam Kannan
- Anand as Kaalan Madhavan
- Anil Murali as S.I. Anthikadan Johnny
- Narayanankutty as Harichandran
- Saranya Sasi as Anna
- Poornima Anand as Malini
- Sajitha Betti as Alice
- Tosh Christy as Manjeri Hamsa
- Santhosh Jogi as Valsan
- Ajith Kollam as Shankar Yadav
- Abu Salim as Shaji, Devanji's henchman
