= Nanben Da (TV series) =

- Logo
- Also known as: Friendship
- Genre: Comedy talk show
- Presented by: RJ Vigneshkanth; Tom Frank
- Country of origin: India
- Original language: Tamil
- No. of episodes: 27 (list of episodes)

Production
- Camera setup: Multi-camera
- Running time: approx. 40-45 minutes per episode

Original release
- Network: Zee Tamil
- Release: 18 June – 10 December 2017

Nanben Da is a 2017 Indian Tamil language comedy chat show which airs on Zee Tamil every Sunday at 1:30PM (IST) from 18 June 2017 to 10 December 2017 for 27 Episodes. The show was shift at 1:00PM (IST) The show's anchors are Smile Settai, and RJ Vigneshkanth.

== Overview ==
The show features three or four guests and two anchors, the core idea is to get them to share their nostalgic memories besides funny and interesting moments. The guests are actors, musicians, newsreaders, TV stars, stunt masters, comedians, dancers and more. The show has five segments.

== List of Episodes ==
Episodes	Celebrities	Notes	Telecast date
01	Sanjeev; Deepak Dinkar; Shreekumar	Television Actors, television presenter	18 June 2017
02	Nisha Krishnan; Sandra Amy; Vanitha Hariharan	Television Actress and television presenter	25 June 2017
03	Sandy; Nandha; K. Sivasankar	Dance Masters	2 July 2017
04	Saranya; Ranjith; Monica	News Presenter	9 July 2017
05	Thalapathy Dinesh; Besant Ravi; Mahanadi Shankar	Stuntman	16 July 2017
06	Hiphop Tamizha; Shahra; Aathmika	Meesaya Murukku Movie Team	23 July 2017
07	Gana Ulaganathan; Chinnaponnu; Mahalingam	Tamil Folk music Singers	30 July 2017
08	Samuthirakani; Namo Narayana; Sriman	Actors	6 August 2017
09	Archana; Badava Gopi; Sutti Aravid	Anchors	13 August 2017
10	Aalap Raju; Ranjith; Rahul Nambiar	playback singer	20 August 2017
11	V. J. Chitra; Madhan; Azhagappan	Television Actors	27 August 2017
12	Sudhakar; Vijay; Gopi	YouTube VJ	3 September 2017
13	Balaji; Jagan; John Vijay	Actors	10 September 2017
14	Sham; Devi Kirupa; Shyam Sundar	Television Actors	17 September 2017
15	RJ Dheena; RJ Ophelia; RJ Miruthula	Radio Jockey	24 September 2017
16	Manobala; Prem; Thyagu	Actors	1 October 2017
17	Barath; Munish; Chaitra	Yaaradi Nee Mohini Serial Actors	8 October 2017
18	Maheshwari; Keerthi; Ramya NSK	VJ and playback singer	15 October 2017
19	Bobby Simha; Prasanna; Susi Ganeshan	Thiruttu Payale 2 Movie Team	18 October 2017
20	Pooja Vaidyanath; Sathiya; Deepak	playback singer	22 October 2017
21	Clara; Kathir; Arivalagan	Dancers	29 October 2017
22	Sidharth; Mani	Choreography (dance) and Television Actor	5 November 2017
23	Reshma Reya; Krithika Laddu; Diwakar	Poove Poochudava Serial Actors	12 November 2017
24	Rajmohan; Ashwin Rao; Balaji Venugopal	Reporters and television presenter	19 November 2017
25	Puvi Arasu; Karthik; Kamal	Dancers, television presenter, Actors	26 November 2017
26	Ganga; V. Uma Shankar; Mohan Vaidya	Carnatic and playback singer	3 December 2017
27	Uma Maheswari; Gopi; Deepa Venkat	dubbing artist	10 December 2017
