= Samayal Express =

- Genre: Cooking show
- Presented by: Ayesha Zeenath (S1); Shaalin Zoya (S2)
- Judges: Season 1 Seetha (episodes 1-5); Krishna McKenzie; Sujitha (episodes 6-29); Season 2 Sujitha
- Country of origin: India
- Original language: Tamil
- No. of seasons: 2

Production
- Camera setup: Multi-camera
- Running time: approx. 45-50 minutes per episode
- Production company: Nandri Productions

Original release
- Network: Zee Tamil
- Release: 15 September 2024 – present

Samayal Express is a 2024 Indian Tamil-language cooking game show which airs on Zee Tamil and streamed on ZEE5. Over two years, Samayal Express has rolled out two seasons. The first season premiered on 15 September 2024 and ended on 30 March 2025. The first season is hosted by Ayesha Zeenath and judged by Seetha (episodes 1-5), Krishna McKenzie and Sujitha. It features Tamil dishes.

The second season premiered on 13 July 2025 on every Sunday. Sujitha returned to host and judged, along with Shaalin Zoya.

== Series overview ==
Season	Episodes	Original Broadcast		Host
Season	Episodes	First Aired	Last Aired	Host
1	29	15 September 2024	30 March 2025	Ayesha Zeenath
2	TBA	13 July 2025	TBA	Shaalin Zoya

== Season 1 ==
The first season aired from 15 September 2024 to 30 March 2025 on every Sunday at 13:30 and ended with 29 Episodes. The show was hosted by Ayesha Zeenath and judged by Krishna McKenzie, Seetha and Sujitha.

=== Episodes ===
Episodes	Release date	Team		Ref
1	15 September 2024	Madhumitha H. Priyadharshini	Salma Arun; Preetha Reddy	
2	22 September 2024	Myna Nandhini; Yogeswaram	Srithika Saneesh; SSR Aaryann	
3	29 September 2024	Farina Azad; Singapore Deepan	Shamili Sukumar; Diwakar	
4	6 October 2024	Shobanaa; Singapore Deepan	Padine Kumar; Fouziee	
5	13 October 2024	Robo Shankar; Priyanka Robo Shankar	Senthil Ganesh; Rajalakshmi	
6	20 October 2024	Sendrayan; Kayalvizhi	Vidyullekha Raman; Sanjay	

== Season 2 ==
The second season of the Samayal Express show, It premiered on 13 July 2025. Sujitha has officially once again been appointed as the judge, Ayesha Zeenath was replaced by Shaalin Zoya as host.

=== Episodes ===
Episodes	Release date	Guest	Ref
1	13 July 2025	Sanjeev Venkat & Preethi Sanjeev	
2	20 July 2025	Deepa & Shankar	
3	27 July 2025	Vadivukkarasi & Nalini	
4	3 August 2025	Darshan & Aarisha	
5	10 August 2025	Vignesh & Uma	
6	17 August 2025	Snehan & Kannika Ravi	
7	24 August 2025	Nakkhul & Sruti Bhaskar	
8	31 August 2025	Vichithra & Shaaji	
9	7 September 2025	Praveena Bhagyaraj & Saranya	
10	14 September 2025	Myna Nandhini & Yogeswaram	
11	21 September 2025	Ambika & Jovika Vijayakumar	
12	28 September 2025	Senthil Ganesh & Rajalakshmi	
13	5 October 2025	Bose Venkat & Sonia	
14	12 October 2025	Kumaran & Deepika	
15	19 October 2025	Anupama & Aadhithya & Yuvina	
16	26 October 2025	Gayathri & Vanaja	
17	31 October 2025	TSK & Vaishu	
18	7 November 2025	Aadhithya & Anju	
19	16 November 2025	Grace Karunas & Rithika	
20	23 November 2025	Reshma & Kirthika	
21	30 November 2025	Indraja & Priyanka Roboshankar	
22	14 December 2025	Deepak & Shivaranjini	
23	11 January 2026	Gayathri & Yuvaraj	
24	8 February 2026	Dharani & Kitcha	
25	15 February 2026	Namitha & Veerendra	
26	22 February 2026	Nizhalgal Ravi & Rekha	
27	1 March 2026	Deena & Julie	
28	9 March 2026	Muthukumaran & Amma	

== Production ==
=== Release ===
The first teaser was released on 28 August 2024, featuring Seetha with the slogan "Avanga Veedu Samayalai Parthirupinga Ivanga Veedu Samaiyalai Parthiruppinga Namma Veedu Samayalai Parkka Ready ah". The second teaser was unveiled on 30 August 2024, featuring second judge Krishna McKenzie. The first episode was telecast on Sunday, 15 September 2024.
