= Krishna McKenzie =

British singer and social media personality

- Born: United Kingdom
- Occupations: Singer; Public speaker; YouTuber; Agriculturalist
- Spouse: Deepa McKenzie

Krishna McKenzie is a British singer, songwriter, agriculturalist, celebrity chef, public speaker, and television presenter who is known for his social media accounts in which he speaks about the importance of organic farming, permaculture, and Tamil cooking. Fluent in Tamil, he lives in Auroville, Puducherry, India, where he owns a farm-to-table café known as Solitude Farm.

He made his television debut as a reality cooking show judge in Samayal Express, which airs on Zee Tamil.

== Early life ==
Krishna McKenzie was born in the United Kingdom, where he studied at Jiddu Krishnamurti's school in Brockwood Park, Hampshire. Inspired by the school's teachings, Mackenzie moved from the United Kingdom to Auroville, Tamil Nadu, India in 1993. While living in Auroville, he quickly learned Tamil and imbibed in Tamil culture. He briefly went to Japan, where he met his girlfriend and also had the chance to listen to a lecture by Masanobu Fukuoka on natural farming. He opened Solitude Farm in 1996, using farming techniques by Fukuoka.

== Artistry ==
Krishna founded the band Emergence for which he has been the lead vocalist and has released albums with songs in both English and Tamil. The band was founded in 2006 in Auroville. The band has released songs using jazz, acoustic rock, and dappankuthu.

Emergence has performed at Glastonbury Festival, Maximum India Festival in Washington, D.C., and The Blue Frog in Mumbai.
