= Karpoora Mullai =

1991 film directed by Fazil

- Poster
- Directed by: Fazil
- Written by: Fazil
- Starring: Raja; Amala; Srividya
- Cinematography: Anandakuttan
- Edited by: T.R.Sekhar
- Music by: Ilaiyaraaja
- Production company: Ilayaraja Creations
- Release date: 11 April 1991
- Country: India
- Language: Tamil

Karpoora Mullai is a 1991 Indian Tamil-language film directed by Fazil, starring Raja, Amala and Srividya. The bilingual film was simultaneously shot in Malayalam as Ente Sooryaputhrikku.

== Plot ==
Maya (Amala) is a troublemaker. She always creates issues in her college and hostel. One day along with her friends, she decides to make fun of a Dr. Srinivas (Suresh Gopi). She fakes being sick, consults him and later proposes him. But Srinivas in turn insults her saying that she is a adopted and that she doesn't even know who are her parents, further adding that she don't deserve to be in front of him or his mother. Hurt, Maya confront her guardian whom she considers as her uncle and later attempts suicide. She is taken to the hospital by her friends and Srinivas saves her and she gets back to normal.

After few incidents, Srinivas confesses that he has feeling for Maya, but she tells him that she'll only accept the proposal after finding her parents. Finally she discovers that her father had adopted her when she was baby and her biological mother was K. S Vasundhara Devi (Srividya), a famous singer. She tries her every bit to make her mom accept her. Though adamant initially, Vasundhara eventually accepts Maya but tells her that she can't disclose who her father is. Maya accepts that telling she just wants to spend time with her mother and they spend some days together happily.

After days if being together, Vasundhara decides to announce Maya as her daughter to the public and marry her off to Srinivas. Maya leaves to her hostel saying that she'll bring Srinivas the next day. The next day, Vasundhara Devi is murdered by her administration employees for her wealth. Maya and Srinivas reach only to find Vasundhara in a critical stage. Srinivas tries to get her to the hospital but is stopped by the employees and he tells Maya to somehow take her mother to the hospital. Maya asks police for help but they tell her that she cannot be trusted.

She then drives to her friend's home and asks her family for help. Her friend's father Vinod Shankar (M. G. Soman) decides to help and calls Vasundhara only to know it is too late. They go to Maya's house and Maya goes upstairs, confronts the culprits and when they try to kill her, she accidentally shoots one of them and then willingly kills her mother's killers and publicly admits it. Just then her friend runs towards her and says that Vinod is Maya's father too making them step sisters. Vinod accepts this and hugs Maya. Maya tells him that she never intended to disturb him as she promised to her mother but anyhow she ended up in disturbing him in the end. Srinivas arrives and a distraught Maya tells him that there is her mother and father and asks him whether he will accept her now. Srinivas lovingly hugs her and she is sent to jail. They both get married while she serves her sentence.

== Cast ==
- Raja as Dr. Srinivas
- Amala as Maya Vinodini
- Srividya as Vasundhara Devi K. S
- Sumithra as Dr. Srinivas's mother
- TS. Raghavendra
- Prathapachandran as Shiva Prasad
- Vijayakumar as Vinod Shankar
- Bheeman Raghu as Ravi
- Suma Jayaram
- Kalady Omana
- Fazil as guest appearance
- Suresh Gopi as guest appearance song ''Poongaaviyam''
- Kanya Bharathi

== Soundtrack ==
The soundtrack was composed by Ilaiyaraaja.

Track listing
No.	Title	Lyrics	Singer(s)	Length
1.	"Karpoora Mullai"	Vaali	K. S. Chithra	5:00
2.	"Poonkaaviyam I"	Vaali	P. Susheela	4:43
3.	"Vaama Vaa"	Ilaiyaraaja	K. S. Chithra	4:37
4.	"Poonkaaviyam II"	Vaali	K. J. Yesudas, P. Susheela, K. S. Chithra	4:43
5.	"Shree Siva"		P. Leela	4:40
Total length:				23:43

== Reception ==
N. Krishnaswamy of The Indian Express called it "Alternatively vibrant and serious [..] built up well by director Fazil [..]".
