= Kanya Bharathi =

Indian actress

- Born: 1974 (age 51–52)
- Occupation: Actress
- Years active: 1991 – present

Kanya Bharathi is an Indian actress known for her work in Malayalam and Tamil television soap operas. She was noticed for her role in Ente Sooryaputhrikku and later went on to act in several Malayalam films. She is popularly known for her roles in TV series namely Manasi, Chandanamazha, Deivam Thandha Veedu, Valli, Nandhini and Amma.

== Television ==
Year	Serial	Role	Language	Channel
	Neelavanam		Malayalam	DD Malayalam
	Malathipookkalkku Mounam		Malayalam	DD Malayalam
	Avalum Penthane		Tamil	Sun TV
2000	Snehaseema		Malayalam	DD Malayalam
2003–2004	Ahalya		Malayalam	Surya TV
2004	Manasi	Meera IPS	Malayalam	DD Malayalam
2004–2005	Omanathingal Pakshi	Dr. Vimala George	Malayalam	Asianet
2005–2006	Selvi	Janaki	Tamil	Sun TV
2005	Kavyanjali	Anjali	Tamil	Vijay TV
2006	Lakshmi		Tamil	Sun TV
2006	Kasthuri		Tamil	Sun TV
2006–2008	Kalyani		Malayalam	Surya TV
2006-2008	Bhandham	Thamirabharani	Tamil	Sun TV
2007	Nirmalyam		Malayalam	Asianet
2007	Dream City	Jayanthi	Malayalam	Surya TV
2007	Nombarappoovu	Vasundhara	Malayalam	Asianet
2007	Swami Ayyappan		Malayalam	Asianet
2007	Vepilaikari	Vadivu	Tamil	Sun TV
2010–2012	Chellamay	Madhumita	Tamil	Sun TV
2010	Devi Mahatmyam	Arundati Thampuratti	Malayalam	Asianet
2010	Meera	Mekala	Tamil	Vijay TV
2011–2014	Amma	Subhadra	Malayalam	Asianet
2012	Manasaveena	Anuradha	Malayalam	Mazhavil Manorama
2012	Aval		Tamil	Vijay TV
2013–2019	Valli	Mythili	Tamil	Sun TV
2013	Ullkadal		Malayalam	Kairali TV
2013–2017	Deivam Thandha Veedu	Bhanumathy	Tamil	Vijay TV
2014–2017	Chandanamazha	Mayavathy	Malayalam	Asianet
2017–2018	Nandini	Devi	Tamil; Kannada	Sun TV; Udaya TV
2017	Sathyam Shivam Sundaram	Swarna Thampuratti	Malayalam	Amrita TV
2017–2019	Ennu Swantham Jaani	Yamini	Malayalam	Surya TV
2017–2019	Azhagiya Tamil Magal	Maya	Tamil	Zee Tamil
2019–2021	Sundari Neeyum Sundaran Naanum	Indrani	Tamil	Star Vijay
2019	Pournami Thinkal	Vasanthamallika	Malayalam	Asianet
2020-2024	Anbe Vaa	Parvathi	Tamil	Sun TV
2020–2023	Kaiyethum Dhoorathu	Mangala	Malayalam	Zee Keralam
2021	Kannana Kanne	Parvathi	Tamil	Sun TV
2021–2022	Chithiram Pesuthadi	Producer	Tamil	Zee Tamil
2023–2025	Anandharagam	Sumangala	Malayalam	Surya TV
2024–2025	Valliyin Velan	Vedhanayagi	Tamil	Zee Tamil
2026–present	Mukhachithram	Mayavathi	Malayalam	Mazhavil Manorama

== Other TV shows ==
Year	Title	Role	Channel	Language	Notes
2016	Ammayimar Varum Ellam Sheruyakum	Mayavati	Asianet	Malayalam	Telefilm
2016	Comedy Stars	Judge	Asianet	Malayalam	Reality show
2019	Annies Kitchen	Guest	Amrita TV	Malayalam	
2022	Mathappu Mamiyar Pattas Marumagal	Parvathi	Sun TV	Tamil	
2023	Super Kudumbam	Parvathi	Sun TV	Tamil	
2026	Oru Chiri Iru Chiri Bumper Chiri 3	Guest	Mazhavil Manorama	Malayalam	

== Filmography ==
Year	Film	Role	Language	Notes
1990	Appu	Sarojini's friend	Malayalam	
1991	Ente Sooryaputhrikku	Hema	Malayalam	
1991	Karpoora Mullai	Maya's friend	Tamil	
1993	Ithu Manjukalam	Susan	Malayalam	
1994	Bharya	Chithra	Malayalam	
1994	Ilayum Mullum	Lakshmi	Malayalam	
1994	The Porter	Shalini	Malayalam	
1994	Kadalkakka		Malayalam	
1995	Punnaram	Sumithra	Malayalam	
1995	Bali		Malayalam	
1996	Hitlist	Sophiya	Malayalam	
1996	Mookkilla Rajyathu Murimookkan Rajavu	Bhama	Malayalam	
1996	Kanchanam	Meera	Malayalam	
1996	Kaalapani	Mukundan's sister	Malayalam	
1997	Kalyana Kacheri	Sathyabhama	Malayalam	
1997	Nagarapuraanam	Jessy Jose	Malayalam	
1998	Amma Ammaayiyamma	Renuka	Malayalam	
1998	Saat Rang Ke Sapne	Rampyari Devi's daughter	Hindi	
2001	Ladies and Gentlemen	Annie	Malayalam	
2001	Jyothirgamaya		Malayalam	
2002	Puthooramputhri Unniyarcha	Kunjunnooli	Malayalam	
2006	Prajapathi	Devaki	Malayalam	
2010	Thanthonni	Kochukunju's aunt	Malayalam	
2010	Pokkiriraja	Malini Rajendra Babu	Malayalam	
2015	Thinkal Muthal Velli Vare	Herself	Malayalam	Guest appearance
2019	Mr. Local	Kuthala Chidambaram's wife	Tamil	Cameo appearance
2026	Lakshmikanthan Kolai Vazhakku	Annam	Tamil	
