= Krishna Pakshakkilikal =

- Directed by: Abraham Lincoln
- Written by: A. K. Puthussery
- Screenplay by: A. K. Puthussery
- Produced by: Pradeep Paliyath
- Starring: Revathy; Pradeep Paliyath; Bindu Panicker; Kalabhavan Santhosh
- Cinematography: Murali Krishna
- Edited by: Vijaya Kumar
- Music by: Raveendran
- Production company: Sapthavarna Films
- Distributed by: Sapthavarna Films
- Release date: 2002
- Country: India
- Language: Malayalam

Krishna Pakshakkilikal is a 2002 Indian Malayalam-language film directed by K. J. Abraham Lincoln and produced by Pradeep Paliyath. The film stars Revathy, Pradeep Paliyath, Bindu Panicker and Kalabhavan Santhosh in lead roles. The film has musical score by Raveendran.

== Cast ==
- Revathy
- Pradeep Paliyath
- Bindu Panicker
- Kalabhavan Santhosh
- Master Amal Mohan
- Master Syamsundar
- Narendra Prasad
- Sai Kumar
- Karthika Mathew
- Ambika Mohan
- Meghna Vincent
- Kuriakose P. V.

== Soundtrack ==
The music was composed by Raveendran.

No.	Song	Singers	Lyrics	Length (m:ss)
1	"Poothumbi"	Jayachandran	Bharanikkavu Sivakumar	
2	"Vande Maatharam"	K. J. Yesudas	Bharanikkavu Sivakumar, Bankim Chandra Chatterji	
