= Oru Oorla Rendu Rajakumari =

Indian Tamil language television series

- Genre: Drama
- Screenplay by: Ashok Kumar
- Directed by: Narayana Moorthy (before leap); Nandha Kumar (after leap)
- Starring: Ashwini Radhakrishna
- Theme music composer: Dharma Prakash
- Country of origin: India
- Original language: Tamil
- No. of episodes: 321

Production
- Producers: Shruthi Narayanan; Vinodha Narayanan
- Cinematography: Rajesh
- Editors: S.Arul, Jaisimha
- Running time: approx. 22–24 minutes per episode
- Production company: Shruthi Productions

Original release
- Network: Zee Tamil
- Release: 25 October 2021 – 12 November 2022

Related
- Oru Oorla Oru Rajakumari

Oru Oorla Rendu Rajakumari (transl. Two princess in a town) is a 2021-2022 Indian Tamil-language family drama on Zee Tamil and streams on ZEE5. It premiered on 25 October 2021 and ended on 12 November 2022 and stars Ashwini Radhakrishna, who acts the role Rasathi in both the seasons. It is a sequel of Oru Oorla Oru Rajakumari after 6 year leap and this second season again took 16 year leap.

The series premiered along with Sathya 2, by ending their first seasons on 24 October 2021 and starting the second seasons on the next day 25 October 2021, and ended on 12 November 2022 with 321 episodes.

== Synopsis ==
After some struggles, Rasathi and Iniyan blessed with girl baby named Bhoomika, while Kanmani and Kumaran blessed with girl baby named Swetha. Rasathi's daughter is cute, while Kanmani's daughter is attractive. But Maragatham love Rasathi's daughter more because the truth is she swapped the babies of Rasathi and Kanmani. Now Rasathi and Iniyan were the biological parents of Swetha where Kanmani and Kumaran are the biological parents of Bhoomika. One day the truth reveals and Maragatham decides to separate Swetha from Rasathi with the help of Kanmani. So they escaped the from that place with Swetha and lived in another city.

=== 16 years later ===
Rasathi blessed with twin babies and she worried about Swetha's missing. Now Kanmani, Maragatham and Bhoomika treated Swetha as a servant in their house. Can Rasathi and Swetha meets forms rest of the story.

== Cast ==
=== Main ===
- Ashwini Radhakrishna as
  - Rasathi: Shenbakavally's daughter; Kabilan's sister; Iniyan's wife; Swetha, Shiva and Shreya's mother; Bhoomika's adoptive mother
  - Swetha: Rasathi and Iniyan's elder daughter; Kanmani and Kumaran's adopted daughter; Shiva and Shreya's sister; Maddy's wife
    - Meghna Mrithika as Child Swetha
- Puviarasu as Iniyan: Mangai and Paarivendan's son; Kumaran and Punitha's cousin; Rasathi's husband; Swetha, Shiva and Shreya's father; Bhoomika's adoptive father
- Indhu Chowdary as Bhoomika: Kanmani and Kumaran's daughter; Rasathi and Iniyan's adopted daughter; Gowtham's wife
  - Sahasraa as Child Bhoomika
- Ayub VJ as Madhavan aka Maddy: Shivashankaran and Kalpana's youngest son; Prakash, Gowtham and Preethi's brother; Swetha's husband
- Santhosh as Gowtham: Shivashankaran and Kalpana's second son; Prakash, Maddy and Preethi's brother; Bhoomika's husband

=== Recurring ===
- Swathi Royal / Sivaranjani as Kanmani: Kokila's daughter; Kumaran's wife; Bhoomika's mother; Swetha's adoptive mother
- Vishnukanth as Kumaran: Maragatham and Nesamani's son; Punitha's brother; Iniyan's cousin; Kanmani's husband; Bhoomika's father; Swetha's adoptive father
- Dhipa Nethran as Mangai: Paarivendan's wife; Iniyan's mother; Swetha, Shiva and Shreya's grandmother
- Prabhakaran Chandran as Paarivendan: Nesamani's brother; Mangai's husband; Iniyan's father; Swetha, Shiva and Shreya's grandfather
- Bindhu Aneesh / Uma Rani as Maragatham: Nesamani's wife; Kumaran and Punitha's mother; Bhoomika's grandmother
- Ravi Varma as Nesamani: Paarivendan's brother; Maragatham's husband; Kumaran and Punitha's father; Bhoomika's grandfather
- Saira Banu as Punitha: Maragatham and Nesamani's daughter; Kumaran's sister; Iniyan's cousin; Kabilan's wife
- Sudharsanam as Kabilan: Shenbakavally's son; Rasathi's brother; Punitha's husband
- Geetha Saraswathi as Shenbakavally: Rasathi and Kabilan's mother; Swetha, Shiva and Shreya's grandmother
- Dhachayani as Shreya: Rasathi and Iniyan's younger daughter; Swetha and Shiva's sister
- Abishek Rathan as Shiva: Rasathi and Iniyan's son; Swetha and Shreya's brother
- Siva Devi as Kokila: Kanmani's mother; Bhoomika's grandmother
- Uvesri as Kalpana: Shivashankaran's wife; Prakash, Gowtham, Maddy and Preethi's mother
- Poovilangu Mohan as Shivashankaran: Kalpana's husband; Prakash, Gowtham, Maddy and Preethi's father
- Shalini Rajan as Preethi: Shivashankaran and Kalpana's daughter; Prakash, Gowtham and Maddy's sister
- Prakash Rajan as Prakash: Shivashankaran and Kalpana's eldest son; Gowtham, Maddy and Preethi's brother; Ragini's husband
- Revathy Gnanamurugan as Ragini: Kousalya and Rajasekar's elder daughter; Shruti's sister; Prakash's wife
- Nila Gracy as Shruthi: Kousalya and Rajasekar's younger daughter; Ragini's sister
- Varnika Dhiya as Kousalya: Rajasekar's wife; Ragini and Shruthi's mother
- Chandru as Rajasekar: Kousalya's husband; Ragini and Shruthi's father
- Vijayakumar as Nattamai (cameo appearance)
