= Pettaikaali (TV series) =

- Genre: Mystery; Romantic
- Directed by: La. Rajkumar
- Starring: Kalaiyarasan; Sheela Rajkumar; Bala Hasan; Antony; Vela Ramamoorthy; Goutham; Kishore
- Country of origin: India
- Original language: Tamil
- No. of seasons: 1
- No. of episodes: 8

Production
- Producer: Vetrimaaran
- Cinematography: Velraj
- Running time: approx.30-45 minutes per episode
- Production company: Grass Root Film Company

Original release
- Network: Aha Tamil
- Release: 21 October 2022 – present

Pettaikaali is a 2022 Indian Tamil-language romantic mystery television series that aired on Aha Tamil. Its producer and showrunner was Vetrimaaran and it was directed by La. Rajkumar.It was produced by Grass Root Film Company, and stars Kishore, Kalaiyarasan, Sheela Rajkumar and Vela Ramamoorthy.

== Cast ==
- Kalaiyarasan as Pandi
- Kishore as Muthaiyaa
- Sheela Rajkumar as Thenmozhi
- Bala Hasan
- Antony as Parthiban
- Vela Ramamoorthy as Selvasekharan
- Goutham

== Production ==
=== Casting ===
Kalaiyarasan was cast as the male lead role of Pandi.

== Original soundtrack ==
=== Title song ===
The title song for Pettaikaali was written by La Rajkumar. It was sung by Santhosh Narayanan.

=== Soundtrack ===
Track listing
| No. | Title | Lyrics | Singer(s) | Length |
|---|---|---|---|---|
| 1. | "Varaan Paar Pettaikaali (வர்றான் பாரு பேட்டைக்காளி)" | La Rajkumar | Santhosh Narayanan | 2:16 |

== Episodes ==
| No. | Title | Directed by | Written by | Original release date |
|---|---|---|---|---|
| 1 | "Thoongum Yerimalayin Peruvedippu" | Raj Kumar | Unknown | 21 October 2022 |
| 2 | "Valvinayum Vanjapperum Pagaiyum" | Raj Kumar | Unknown | 28 October 2022 |
| 3 | "Vanmanenum Kodungoor Aayutham" | Raj Kumar | Unknown | 4 November 2022 |
| 4 | "Kaaliyin Avadharippu" | Raj Kumar | Unknown | 11 November 2022 |
| 5 | "Kadhalin Vazhi Neduga" | Raj Kumar | Unknown | 18 November 2022 |
| 6 | "Anbirkum Undo Adaikunthal" | Raj Kumar | Unknown | 25 November 2022 |
| 7 | "Sadhuranga Kaaigalin Sarivu" | Raj Kumar | Unknown | 2 December 2022 |
| 8 | "Sei Alladhu Sethu Madi" | Raj Kumar | Unknown | 9 December 2022 |

== Release ==
Along with the original version in Tamil, there is also a Telugu language dubbed version on Aha Telugu. The series is also available in Hindi & Marathi language dubbed versions titled as 'Bullfight' streaming on Ultra Play & Ultra Jhakaas app respectively.
