= Dancing Khilladies =

- Cover Photo of Dancing Khilladies
- Genre: Dance show Reality
- Presented by: Deepak Dinkar
- Judges: Sneha; Sudha Chandran; Ambika
- Country of origin: India
- Original language: Tamil
- No. of episodes: 16

Production
- Camera setup: Multi-camera
- Running time: approx. 85-90 minutes per episode

Original release
- Network: Zee Tamil
- Release: 18 February – 3 June 2017

Related
- Dance Jodi Dance

Dancing Khilladies is a 2017-2017 Indian-Tamil-language reality Risky Dance show that aired on Zee Tamil from 18 February 2017 to 3 June 2017 on every Saturday at 8:30PM IST for 16 episodes. The show is hosted by Deepak Dinkar. Actress Sneha, Ambika and accomplished Bharatanatyam dancer and actress Sudha Chandran are the judges of this show.

== Host ==
- Deepak Dinkar: (Episode 1-16)
- Archana: (Episode 15-16)

== Judge ==
- Sneha
- Sudha Chandran: (Episode 1-10)
- Ambika: (Episode 11-16)

== Winners ==
Guest

- Gayathri Raguram with Zee Tamil Family

Winners	Notes	Amount won
Puviarasu & Preetha	Winners	₹ 3,00,000
Varatha & Ramya	1st runner-up	₹ 2,00,000
Karthik & Deashika	2nd runner-up	₹ 1,00,000

== Contestants ==
A total of 8 celebrities, mostly TV actors or Dancers, paired with dancers handpicked through auditions will go head to head in their quest to be best performers.

Male Contestants	Female Contestants
Sidharth	Sindhu
Naveen	Mercina
Puviarasu	Preetha
Jeevan	Vithursha
Kathir	Clara
Varatha	Ramya
Naween	Varshini
Karthik	Deashika

== Episodes ==
Episode	Genre Dance	Telecast date
01	Festival Round (Kovil)	18 February 2017
02	Festival Round (Kovil)	25 February 2017
03	Water Dance Round	4 March 2017
04	Water Dance Round	11 March 2017
05	Height Dance Round	18 March 2017
06	Height Dance Round	25 March 2017
07	Height Dance Round	1 April 2017
08	Air Dance Round	8 April 2017
09	Fire Dance Round	15 April 2017
10	Fire Dance Round	22 April 2017
11	Drama Dance Round	29 April 2017
12	Drama Dance Round	6 May 2017
13	Rain Dance Round	13 May 2017
14	Ice Dance Round	20 May 2017
15	Grand Final	27 May 2017
16	Grand Final	3 June 2017
