= Captain Magal =

1993 film by Bharathiraja

- DVD cover
- Directed by: Bharathiraja
- Screenplay by: Bharathiraja
- Story by: R. Selvaraj
- Produced by: Bharathiraja
- Starring: Raja; Khushbu
- Cinematography: Balu Devan; Ilavarasu
- Edited by: S. Bojaraj
- Music by: Hamsalekha
- Production company: Manoj Creations
- Release date: 14 January 1993
- Country: India
- Language: Tamil

Captain Magal (transl. The Captain's Daughter) is a 1993 Indian Tamil-language action thriller film co-written, produced and directed by Bharathiraja, starring Raja and Khushbu. It was released on 14 January 1993.

== Plot ==
An attempt to assassinate the Prime Minister is made during his visit to Chennai at a music fest. However, the Prime Minister escapes the gunshot, which instead hits the performing musician, Kalyan Kumar. The doctor advises Kalyan Kumar to rest in a hill station for a faster recovery. So, he heads to Black Valley Estate, which belongs to his wife, Kavitha, the daughter of a retired Captain, Sukumar, along with his sister, Rekha, and her husband, police officer Dilip. The police arrest one of the terrorists, Stephen, involved in the attack, but he refuses to reveal any information about the plan despite being subjected to custodial torture. At Black Valley, Rekha senses something ominous, especially when she encounters the mute estate househelp man with a disfigured face.

Kavitha runs into her former worker, horse trainer Rayappa, who had developed feelings for her. However, she didn't reciprocate his love, seeing him only as an employee. Rekha coincidentally takes a photo of Rayappa, who demands she return the film. Kavitha intervenes, and Rayappa calms down, leaving. After a few days, Rekha and Dilip head back home. However, when Kavitha calls to check if they've arrived, she learns they haven't. Sensing something is wrong, Kavitha sets out to find them, following a trail of eagles. She discovers that Rekha and Dilip were brutally murdered. Meanwhile, Kalyan is found fainted near a stream and is rescued by two botany research students, Kumar and Elisa. Kumar offers to help Kavitha, who wants to keep the deaths of Rekha and Dilip a secret from Kalyan due to his heart condition.

However, when they reach the accident spot, they find no evidence of the murder Kavitha had described. Kumar suggests that Kavitha might have hallucinated the whole thing. Kavitha allows Kumar and Elisa to stay at her house, unaware of their true identities as terrorists responsible for the assassination attempt on the Prime Minister. Meanwhile, the househelp finds a pair of Rekha's anklets, which Kavitha had given her, near a lake, thereby confirming that Rekha and Dilip were indeed killed. Upon discovering the truths about Kumar and Elisa, Kavitha and Kalyan try to escape from their estate, but are caught by Livi, another terrorist, who holds them at gunpoint. The police, meanwhile, had been tracking the terrorists and had intentionally released Stephen with a GPS tracking device to catch the entire gang.

As the police track Stephen, Rayappa "Robert" revealed to be the mastermind behind the assassination attempt, kills Stephen. The police shoot Robert, but he escapes and reaches Black Valley, demanding that Kavitha bring a doctor to treat his gunshot wound. Kavitha cleverly calls her relative, Inspector Paulraj, for help, addressing him as Dr. Paulraj. However, it's Paulraj's daughter Anjali who answers, and she's unable to grasp the danger Kavitha is trying to convey. Anjali visits Kavitha and Kalyan, but they're forced to send her away under the terrorists' instructions. Kalyan uses a music piece to convey their situation to Anjali secretly. Understanding the gravity, Paulraj visits Kavitha disguised as a doctor. Kavitha orders a fridge, and Paulraj promises to send it with alms. However, when Kalyan and Kavitha open the fridge, they find Paulraj's corpse inside, revealing that Robert had decoded his hidden message.

Livi and Kumar beat Kavitha and Kalyan, but Kalyan overpowers and holds Elisa hostage to escape. But the terrorists capture Kalyan and mutilate his leg. Anjali, who comes searching for her father, is killed by the terrorists, traumatizing Elisa. Elisa has a change of heart and decides to help Kalyan and Kavitha escape. However, Robert discovers her betrayal and kills her. Months pass, and the Prime Minister is scheduled to visit Black Valley by private flight. The terrorists plan to launch a missile attack from the windmill in Black Valley, and Kavitha and Kalyan overhear their plan. As the police arrive for a check, Kavitha's househelp tries to signal them, but the terrorists kill him. Unbearable, Kavitha decides to take matters into her own hands to stop the assassination plan.

Kavitha and Kalyan cut the electric supply to the windmill and house, and Kavitha makes a break for the vent above the hearth. She escapes into the forest, with Robert hot on her heels. However, she outsmarts him by setting a foothold trap, which catches and Kavitha then sets his body ablaze. Meanwhile, Kalyan manages to kill Kumar but faints in the process. Kavitha lures Livi into the lake where Dilip and Rekha were killed and kills him underwater. With the missile already set to target the Prime Minister's flight, Kavitha rushes back to the windmill. Just as she's about to stop the launch, a half-burned Robert appears, and a fierce fight ensues. Kavitha eventually overpowers and kills him.

Finally, Kavitha and Kalyan manage to manually deactivate the automated missile system, ensuring the Prime Minister's function proceeds successfully.

== Cast ==
- Raja as Kalyan Kumar (voice dubbed by Nizhalgal Ravi)
- Khushbu as Kavitha
- Janagaraj as Inspector Paulraj
- Livingston as Livi
- Napoleon as Rayappa "Robert"
- G. M. Kumar as Kumar "GM"
- Horse Babu as Dilip
- J. Lalitha as Elisa
- Shanthini as Rekha
- Sangita as Anjali
- Ponvannan as a police officer

== Production ==
According to Selvaraj, who wrote the film's story, the title was named after The Captain's Daughter, a novel by the Russian novelist Alexander Pushkin. The film was partly shot at Ooty. The sets of windmill and farmhouse were built there. Although B. Kannan shot the film, his assistant Ilavarasu and Balu Devan were credited as the film's cinematographers.

== Soundtrack ==
The music was composed by Hamsalekha and lyrics were written by Vairamuthu. The song "Endha Pennilum Illadha" attained popularity. The song "Yarumillai" is based on "Prema Baraha" from Prathap (1990), which was also composed by Hamsalekha.

Track listing
No.	Title	Singer(s)	Length
1.	"Endha Pennilum"	S. P. Balasubrahmanyam	5:09
2.	"Nandhavanam Pookkal"	S. P. Balasubrahmanyam, K. S. Chithra	5:08
3.	"Kadhal Raja"	Sujatha Mohan	5:08
4.	"Yarumillai"	Minmini	5:09
5.	"Vaanambadi"	Unni Menon, Sujatha	5:05
Total length:			25:39

== Release and reception ==
Captain Magal was released on 14 January 1993, Pongal day. Malini Mannath of The Indian Express likened it to "a C-grade English thriller, a pathetic attempt at making an action film. It has disjointed scenes, jerky narration and a loosely etched screenplay that seems more of a hotch-potch of various English films". Kalki wrote that frame by frame throughout the film, one could see the director using his own techniques; when the story unfolds the techniques that is supposed to derail the story becomes like the mammoth elephant hiding in the tree.
