= Oru Oorla Oru Rajakumari (TV series) =

Indian TV series

- Genre: Drama
- Screenplay by: Muthuraj(a) T. Rajaji; Dialogues; Marimuthu
- Directed by: R. Devendran (1-353); Narayana Moorthy (354-1016)
- Starring: Ashwini; Puviarasu
- Theme music composer: Vishal Chandrasekar
- Opening theme: "Oru Oorula Oru Rajakumari"
- Composer: Hari
- Country of origin: India
- Original language: Tamil
- No. of episodes: 1,016

Production
- Producers: Jo. Ni. Harsha; T.Saravanan
- Cinematography: K. Raji
- Editor: Ramesh
- Camera setup: Multi-camera
- Running time: approx. 22–24 minutes per episode
- Production companies: Joni films (2018-2020); Shruthi Productions (2020-2021)

Original release
- Network: Zee Tamil
- Release: 23 April 2018 – 24 October 2021

Related
- Oru Oorla Rendu Rajakumari

Oru Oorla Oru Rajakumari (transl. A Princess in a town) is an Indian Tamil-language family soap opera on Zee Tamil and on their ZEE5 platform from 23 April 2018. It stars Ashwini and Puvi Arasu in the lead roles.

The story concerns a young, overweight girl, Rasathi (Ashwini), who battles against body shaming. The plot of the story is taken from the Badho Bahu serial, which airs on &TV.

Due to unavoidable circumstances, the series was discontinued until its second season Oru Oorla Rendu Rajakumari (transl. Two princess in a Town) premiered on 25 October 2021.

== Plot ==
Rasathi is a plus-sized girl who faces prejudice due to her size. Rasathi is a single-parent child, so her mother, Shenbakavalli, and their family, along with Rasathi's father's friend Paarivendan and family, have taken the initiative for Rasathi's marriage since she is the daughter of Paarivendan's friend Rasathi's family have not enough property to arrange the marriage. Paarivendan fixes a man named Shankar for Rasathi, who is already married and has a child. During the wedding, Shankar stops the ceremony. It's because of Paarivendan, who had a problem with Shankar two days before the wedding. Thus Shankar had planned to take revenge against Paarivendan during the ceremony5a. After Shankar leaves from there, Rasathi becomes worried. Paarivendan realizes that it's because of him the marriage has stopped, so he promises Shenbakavalli that his son Iniyan – the village's best Kabaddi player – will marry Rasathi. Iniyan initially rejects this marriage as he loves another girl, but his father compels him to accept and marry Rasathi. In Iniyan's house, everyone except Paarivendan, paternal uncle Nesamani and cousin brother Kumaran, hates Rasathi. Firstly Iniyan's paternal aunt Maragatham, the head of Iniyan's family, hates Rasathi because of her appearance and her belonging to a middle-class family. Secondly, Maragatham's son Kumaran married Rasathi's classmate, Kanmani – a greedy, well-settled and angry girl. She initially loves Iniyan and wishes to marry him but her plan fails because of Rasathi marries Iniyan. So Kanmani decides to take revenge against Rasathi thus marries Kumaran and enters as sister-in-law of Iniyan. Also after some days Kanmani makes Maragatham as an interloper toy to her. Iniyan's mother Mangai initially dislikes Rasathi but seeing her co-sister Maragatham always appreciate her own daughter-in-law Kanmani but criticize Rasathi, Mangai starts to take care of Rasathi. Day-by-day Kanmani gives plans to Maragatham for Rasathi to get stress and tension always. Rasathi needs to overcome the problems which are raised by them.

Iniyan keeps refusing Rasathi and he doesn't allow her to sleep with him. Also Kanmani and Maragatham make them separate. Mangai learns about this and decides to unite them. As days passed on Iniyan understood Rasathi with the help of Mangai and they both unite.

Now Iniyan's cousin sister also Maragatham daughter Punitha, falls in love with Rasathi's younger brother Kabilan. Punitha expresses her love in different ways, but Kabilan has no interest in her, also fearing that his love may spoil Rasathi's life. One day Punitha and Kabilan meet in a theme park and talk about their love. A group of political-party members see their discussion and assume both of them are lovers. So they ask them to get married on that spot. Punitha and Kabilan gets shocked and they refuse to marry. But the group of members took a weapon and compel Kabilan to marry her. So that Kabilan knotted the Mangalyam to Punitha and both married. As the gang moves form that place, both think of how their families will accept. so they decide to keep their marriage a secret. Eventually, Kanmani learns of their marriage and tells Maragatham. The whole family is shocked and Maragatham becomes angry at Kabilan and Rasathi because of this and she tells them to leave their house. But Iniyan supports Rasathi and tells to Maragatham that if Rasathi leaves, he will also accompany her. Maragatham is surprised that Iniyan is speaking to her this way. She says that if Punitha and Kabilan stay, then Rasathi and Iniyan need to leave. Paarivendan, Mangai and Nesamani try to prevent their departure, but Rasathi and Iniyan leave for Punitha and Kabilan's sake.

== Cast ==
=== Main ===
- Ashwini Radhakrishna as Rasathi Iniyan, Iniyan's wife (2018–2021)
- Puvi Arasu as Iniyan, the Kabadi player (2019–2021)
  - Vasanth Vasi (2018) as Iniyan (replaced by Puvi)

=== Recurring ===
Character Name	Present Actor	Previous Actor	Role	Present Actor's Year
Kanmani	Swathi Royal		Kumaran's wife, Rasathi's co-sister and also classmate (Main Antagonist)	2018–2021
Kumaran / Senthil	Vishnukanth	Hemanth Kumar (2018)	Kanmani's husband and Sneha's husband	2019–2021
Mangai	S.Kavitha	Lakshmi (2018–2019)	Iniyan's mother	2020–2021
Paarivendan	Prabhakaran Chandran		Mangai's husband	2018–2021
Maragatham	Uma Rani	Bindhu Aneesh (2018–2019)	Kumaran and Punitha's mother	2020–2021
Nesamani	Ravi Varma		Maragatham's husband	2018–2021
Punitha	Saira Banu		Maragatham's daughter	2018–2021
Kabilan	Sudharsanam	Pradeep Mn	Raasathi's younger brother and Punitha's husband	2019–2021
Alagu	Azhagappan		Iniyan's best friend	2018–2021
Shenbakavally	Geetha Saraswathi	Sabitha Anand (2018)	Rasathi's mother	2019–2021
Ponni	Krithika Laddu	Subathira (2018–2019)	Rasathi's sister-in-law	2020–2021
Elango	Sathya	Kovai Babu	Rasathi's elder brother	2020–2021
Kokila	Devi		Kanmani's mother	2018–2021
Elakkiya	Manisha Sashikumar (Teenager)	Baby Prathiksha (2018)	Ponni's daughter	2019–2021
Kanchana	Sangeetha Balan		A lady don	2020–2021
Sneha	Syamantha Kiran		Senthil's wife	2021
Roja / Monisha	Baby Pari		Sneha's daughter and Rasathi's lovable child	2021
Aishwariya	Akshaya Kimmy		Alagu's wife	2020–2021

=== Cameos ===
Character Name	Actor	Role	Year
Rasathi's father	Jeeva Ravi	Paari's friend	(Dead)
Sorimuthu	Raghavendran	Iniyan's friend	2018-2019
Shankar	Vijay Anand	Rasathi's ex-fiancé	2018

== Casting ==
The series is a family melodrama that airs on Zee Tamil HD. Newcomer Ashwini was cast in the female lead role of Rasathi, and fellow newcomer Vasanth Vasi was cast in the male lead role of Iniyan, later replaced by Puviarasu. While Prabhakaran Chandran, Subathira, Geetha and Azhagappan were also selected for pivotal roles.

== Production ==
Due to COVID-19 pandemic situation Oru Oorla Oru Rajakumari and all other Zee Tamil serials stopped from 28 March. On 27 July all Zee Tamil serials resumed with fresh episodes.

== Crossover episodes ==
This series had crossover the episodes called Maha Sangamam with "Sathya" from 3 August 2020 to 16 August 2020. This Sangamam garnered a top-five position in the most watched Tamil television programs of the week.

Again, this series had the crossover episodes called Maha Sangamam with Sathya for a second time from 9 January 2021 to 7 February 2021 with 30 episodes.

This series had the crossover episodes with Sembaruthi called Sadhanai Sangamam from 12 July 2021 to 31 July 2021.

== Adaptations ==
Language	Title	Original release	Network(s)	Last aired	Notes
Hindi	Badho Bahu बढो बहू	12 September 2016	And TV	25 May 2018	Original
Kannada	Brahmagantu ಬ್ರಹ್ಮಗಂಟು	8 May 2017	Zee Kannada	9 July 2021	Remake
Telugu	Gundamma Katha గుండమ్మ కథ	9 April 2018	Zee Telugu	Ongoing	Remake
Tamil	Oru Oorla Oru Rajakumari ஒரு ஊர்ல ஒரு ராஜகுமாரி	23 April 2018	Zee Tamil	24 October 2021	Remake
Malayalam	Swathi Nakshatram Chothi സ്വാതി നക്ഷത്രം ചോതി	26 November 2018	Zee Keralam	27 March 2020	Remake
