= Sheela Rajkumar =

Indian actress

Sheela
- Born: 1993/06/14; Jayankondam, Ariyalur, Tamil Nadu, India
- Other name: Sheela
- Education: MA Bharatanatyam
- Occupations: Actress; choreographer
- Years active: 2016–present

Sheela Rajkumar is an Indian actress and Bharatanatyam dancer who has worked predominantly in Tamil films.

== Career ==
Sheela is a Bharatanatyam dancer and a trainer. She joined the Chennai-based theatre group Koothu-P-Pattarai where she was performing theatrical arts. Sheela also worked in short films for Kalaignar TV's reality show Naalaya Iyakunar.

In 2016, she played a small role in Arivazhagan's Aarathu Sinam. Her next film To Let was screened at numerous film festivals in 2017 and 2018, and was theatrically released on 21 February 2019. It won the National Film Award for Best Feature Film in Tamil. She was then roped in her first Tamil serial as a leading role in Azhagiya Tamil Magal telecasted in Zee Tamil. In 2018, she appeared in the thriller film Asuravadham. The following year, she acted in Namma Veettu Pillai and in the Malayalam-language film Kumbalangi Nights. In 2020, she played the title role in Draupathi which was censured for its regressive take on caste politics. A year later, she was featured in the progressive political satire, Mandela, which mocks casteism. Later she said she was not aware of Draupathi's politics.

== Personal life ==
Sheela married to Thambi chozhan. On December 2, 2023 she announced that end of her marriage life on social media.

== Filmography ==
Year	Film	Role	Notes
2016	Aarathu Sinam	Malar	
2017	To Let	Amudha	Lead debut
2017	Manusangada	Revathy	
2018	Asuravadham	Kasthuri	
2019	Kumbalangi Nights	Sathi	Malayalam film
2019	Namma Veettu Pillai	Thulasi's mother	
2020	Draupathi	Draupathi	
2021	Mandela	Thenmozhi	
2022	Jothi	Aruljothi	
2022	Mayathirai	Ghost	
2023	Pichaikkaran 2	Raani	
2023	Noodles	Sakthi	
2023	Jigarthanda DoubleX	Lourde	Cameo appearance
2025	Vembu	Vembu	
2025	Gevi	Mandharai	
2025	Aan Paavam Pollathathu	Lakshmi	
2026	G.D.N	Young Chellammal	
2026	Sigma	Guru's mother	
2026	Jailer 2	Pregnant woman	
2026	Ranabaali	Alivelu	Telugu film

== Television ==
Year	Title	Role	Network	Notes
2017–2018	Azhagiya Tamil Magal	Poong Kodi	Zee Tamil	
2017	Livin'	Thaen	Put Chutney	YouTube Web Series
2020	Shakshi	Shakshi	JFW- Just For Women	YouTube Short Films
2020	Edhu Thevaiyo Adhuve Dharmam	Viji	Movie Buff Tamil	YouTube Short Films
2022	Seethai	Seethai	Jolly Wood	YouTube Short Films
2022	Vanakam Tamizha	Herself	Sun TV	Guest
2022	Something Something	Herself	Adithya TV	Guest
2022	Pettaikaali	Thenmozhi	Aha Tamil	

== Awards and nominations ==
Year	Artist/ Work	Honouring Body	Category	Outcome
2020	To Let	Vikatan Awards	Best Debut Female	Nominated
2020	To Let	Zee Cine Awards	Best Debut Female	Nominated
2022	Mandela	67th Filmfare Awards South	Filmfare Award for Best Supporting Actress – Tamil	Nominated
