= Sathya (Tamil TV series) =

Indian television soap opera

- Genre: Drama
- Written by: Dialogues: N. Ramana Gopinath; R. Dramalingam
- Screenplay by: Lobo Samy; G.Sabarinathan
- Directed by: Arun (episodes: 1–51); Sudharsan (episodes: 52–90); A.R. Karthik (episodes: 91–210); N.V. Natarajan (episodes: 211–767)
- Starring: Ayesha Zeenath; Vishnu
- Theme music composer: Vishal Chandrasekar
- Opening theme: "Engadi Engadi"
- Composer: Sekar Sai Bharath
- Country of origin: India
- Original language: Tamil
- No. of episodes: 767

Production
- Producer: R.K. Manohar
- Cinematography: Arjunan Karthik
- Editor: P.Arunkumar
- Camera setup: Multi-camera
- Running time: 22 minutes
- Production company: Rajammal Creations

Original release
- Network: Zee Tamil
- Release: 4 March 2019 – 24 October 2021

Related
- Sathya 2

Sathya is an Indian Tamil television soap opera, starring Ayesha Zeenath and Vishnu. The series aired on Zee Tamil and premiered from 4 March 2019. It is an official remake of the Odia series Sindura Bindu. The story of Sathya, a tomboy, who looks after all the responsibilities of a head of the family. Later, with some major twists and turns of events, she marries Prabhu, a rich man with a big family.

The series follows two seasons, the first season was ended 24 October 2021 by the separation of Sathya and Prabhu and the second season Sathya 2 started from 25 October 2021. and it mainly focus on how Prabhu and Sathya will unite.

== Series overview ==
Series	Episodes	Originally released	
Series	Episodes	First released	Last released
1	767	4 March 2019	24 October 2021
2	303	25 October 2021	6 October 2022

== Plot ==
Sathya is a brave tomboy, who enjoys her life as it comes. She lives with her mother, grandmother and her money-minded elder sister Divya. She owns her late father's mechanic shed. She is always ready to help others at moments notice. Soon, Sathya meets a rich businessman, Prabhu and they become friends. Eventually, Sathya realizes her feelings for Prabhu. Elsewhere Prabhu's marriage is fixed with Divya. Sathya is unaware about Prabhu and Divya's marriage, but is left heartbroken after learning this.

On the wedding day, Divya is kidnapped by her ex-fiancé, Bala and later she meets with an accident. Then, Sathya's grandmother reveals that Sathya is Divya's sister, which shocks Prabhu and his family. However, Prabhu and Sathya get married unwillingly, as they are forced by their families to save the family honour. After marriage Sathya's mother Janaki apologises to her for the way she treated her before and advices on how to behave with the new family.

Despite the treacheries done by Prabhu's Sister and Uncle to throw Sathya out of Prabhu's life, because she is against their evil selfish interests. Sathya outsmarts them by her wit. Sathya generously forgives them and hides many of their wrong-doings from Prabhu. But the 'bad company' takes this as an advantage.

Nearly a year after marriage, Sathya is accepted by Prabhu and they live happily. Soon after, Divya returns and she too joins the 'bad company' and tries to create problems between Sathya and Prabhu, but all in vain. Finally, Sathya becomes pregnant and Prabhu is excited and gets over protective of her. However, when Prabhu is in danger, as planned by the 'bad company', Sathya comes out of her confinement and saves Prabhu from being killed and in the process she loses her baby.

Fallen to treachery, Prabhu banishes Sathya from house blaming her for the miscarriage, but actually Prabhu has unintentionally hit Sathya by his car, causing to abortion. Sathya hides the truth and feels guilty for not adhering to Prabhu's advices. Sathya and Prabhu get separated due to Prabhu's arrogance.

== Cast ==
=== Main ===
- Ayesha Zeenath as Sathya aka Rowdy Baby – A tomboy mechanic (2019–2021)
- Vishnu as Prabhu aka Amul Baby – A naive business tycoon; Sathya's husband. (2019–2021)

=== Recurring ===
- Indran as Sasi aka Kullabotham – Sujatha's son; Prabhu's best friend; Meera's love interest; Selvi's husband. (2019–2021)
- Santhosh as Kathir – Sathya's brotherly friend; Meena's brother; Sowmya's husband. (2019–2021)
- Shalini Sundar / Preethi Pritu / Sandhya Dhaiyan as Sowmya – Sadhasivam and Nirmala's daughter; Saravanan's sister; Kathir's wife. (2019–2021)
- Yuvashree as Indhumathi – Shanthi Devi and Devika's sister; Shanmugam's wife; Vignesh, Anitha's mother. (2019–2021)
- S. Rajasekar / Anbalaya Prabhakaran as Shanmugasundaram – Sadhasivam's brother; Indhumathi's widower; Vignesh, Anitha and Prabhu's father. (2019) / (2019–2021)
- Srividya Natrajan as Anitha – Shanmugasundaram and Indumati's daughter; Prabhu and Vignesh's sister; Veerasingham's wife. (2019–2021)
- Pondy Ravi / Poraali Dileepan as Veerasingam – Pooja's brother; Anitha's husband. (2019) / (2019–2021)
- Visalakshi Manikandan as Nirmala – Sadhasivam's wife; Saravanan and Sowmya's mother. (2019–2021)
- Parthan Siva / Ravishankar as Sadhasivam – Shanmugam's brother; Nirmala's husband; Saravanan and Soumya's father. (2019–2021)
- Nesan as Vignesh – Shanmugasundaram and Indumati's elder son; Anitha and Prabhu's brother; Kavita's husband. (2019–2021)
- Janaki Devi / Ramya Joseph as Kavitha Vignesh – Vignesh's wife. (2019–2021)
- Seetha as Janaki – Vadivelu's widow; Divya and Sathya's mother. (2019–2021)
- Lakshmi Priya / Geetha Ravishankar as Subalakshmi – Velayutham and Vadivelu's mother; Kumar, Divya and Sathya's grandmother. (2019–2021)
- Sriram Chandrasekar as Saravanan – Sadhasivam and Nirmala's son; Sowmya's brother (2020–2021)
- Dhakshana as Selvi – Prabhu's ex-house maid; Sasi's wife. (2020–2021)
- Yogeshwaran as Bala – Divya's ex-fiancé; Prabhu's ex-friend. (2019–2020)
- Koli Ramya as Divya Vadivelu – Janaki and Vadivelu's elder daughter; Sathya's sister; Prabhu and Bala's ex-fiancée. (2019–2021)
- Sadhishkumar as Makhan – Sathya's friend (2019–present)
- Giri as Papaali – Sathya's friend (2019–present)
- Rajesh as Panaimandai – Sathya's friend (2019–present)
- Sirish as Thakkali – Sathya's friend (2019–present)
- Maadycaleb as Mandaipoonai – Sathya's friend (2019–present)
- Amutha as Vasanthi – Prabhu's house maid (2019–2021)
- Sujatha as Sujatha – Sasi's mother (2021–2021)
- Rajkanth as Vadivelu – Subalakshmi's younger son; Velayutham's brother; Janaki's husband; Divya and Sathya's father. (Dead) (2019)
- Thidiyan as Kumar – Velayutham's son; Sathya and Divya's cousin. (2020)
- Monohar Meenakshi Krishnan as Velayutham – Subalakshmi's elder son; Vadivelu's brother; Kumar's father. (2019–2020)
- Tharani Devi as Meena – Kathir's sister (2020)
- Chandhrika as Chitra – Kathir's cousin (2020)
- Arjun as Dinesh – Sowmya's fixed fiancé (2020)
- Jenifer Rechaal as Meera – Sasi's love interest (2020)
- Monish as Vinoth – Prabhu's business enemy who saved Divya (2020)
- Preethi as Jenny – Vinoth's wife and Chidambaram's daughter (2020)
- Bala Subramani as Chidambaram – Jenny's father (2020)
- Rakshithakundar as Pooja – Veerasingam's sister (2019)
- Sasirekha as Sudha – Divya's friend (2019)
- Lobo Samy as Lober Samy – MLA of area (2019)
- Deepa Baskar as Deepa – Lober Samy's wife (2019)
- Geetha Narayanan as Minister Saraswathy (2019)
- Santhiya as Maggie – Kuberan's wife (2021)
- N. Ramanagopinath as Dharma (2021)
- Santhosh as Ranjith (2021)
- N.V. Natrajan as EX-MLA Natrajan (2021)

=== Cameo appearances ===
- Kathadi Ramamurthy as a fortune-teller who predicted about Prabhu's wife in first episode (2019)
- Shreekumar as IPS Annamalai (2020)
- Dhanalakshmi as Anu (2019)
- Santhosh as Venkat (2019)
- Surjith Ansary as Dhandhapani (2019)
- Sreenidhi Sudarshan as Dhandhapani's wife (2019)
- Diwakar as Ranveer (2019)
- Jai Akash as ASP Rajavaran (2021)

== Crossover episodes ==
This series had a crossover of episodes called Maha Sangamam with Oru Oorla Oru Rajakumari from 3 August 2020 to 16 August 2020. This garnered the top 5 position in the most watched Tamil television programs of the week.

Again, the series had a crossover of episodes called Maha Sangamam with Oru Oorla Oru Rajakumari from 9 January 2021 to 7 February 2021 with 30 episodes.

== Awards ==
Zee Tamil Kudumbam Viruthugal
Year	Category	Recipient	Ref.
2019	Favourite Onscreen Pair	Vishnu and Ayesha	
2019	Best Hero	Vishnu	
2019	Best Heroine	Ayesha	
2019	Most Popular Appa	S. Rajasekar	
2020	Favourite Actress	Ayesha	
2020	Favourite Serial	Sathya	
2020	Best Director	N.V. Natarajan	
2020	Best Comedian	Indran	
2020	Most Popular Mamiyar	Yuvasree	
2020	Best Screenplay Writer	Lobo Samy	
2020	Best Dialogue Writer	N. Ramana Gopinath	
