= Sa Re Ga Ma Pa Seniors season 4 =

Sa Re Ga Ma Pa Seniors
- Season 4
- Saregamapa Season 4
- Presented by: Archana Chandhoke
- Judges: Srinivas; Saindhavi; Karthik; Vijay Prakash; Shweta Mohan; Abhirami (guest judge)
- Winner: Magizhan Paridhi
- Runner-up: Shwetha Sristi

Release
- Original network: Zee Tamil; ZEE5
- Original release: 27 April – 20 October 2024

Season chronology
- ← Previous; Season 3 Next → Season 5

The fourth season of the Indian Tamil-language reality singing television series Sa Re Ga Ma Pa Seniors, aired on Zee Tamil from 27 April 2024 every Saturday and Sunday at 19:00. The streaming platform of the Tamil series of Sa Re Ga Ma Pa is ZEE5. Contestants who were above the age of 18 years were permitted to audition to showcase their talent on the platform.

Srinivas, Vijay Prakash and Karthik return to judge the contestants during the fourth season of Sa Re Ga Ma Pa Seniors. Saindhavi Prakash is the fourth new judge to join the judging panel for the fourth seniors season of Sa Re Ga Ma Pa. Archana Chandhoke has returned as the host for the eighth time, including both the seniors and Li'l champs seasons.

On 20 October 2024, uring the live telecast of the Grand Finale of the show, Magizhan Paridhi emerged as the title winner of the inaugural edition of the Sa Re Ga Ma Pa Seniors season 4 and Shwetha claimed the first runners-up.

== Judges ==
Judges	Description
Srinivas	Playback singer in Tamil, Telugu, Malayalam, Kannada and Hindi music industry. He has also judged in several other reality shows such as Seniors Season 3, Li'l Champs Season 3, Seniors Season 2, Super Singer 5, Super Singer 4, Super Singer 3, Super Singer 2 and Super Singer 1.
Saindhavi	A Carnatic and Indian film playback singer. Saindhavi Prakash is the former wife of music composer, G. V. Prakash Kumar. She has previously also judged in Sa Re Ga Ma Pa Li'l Champs Season 3.
Karthik	A Tamil, Telugu, Malayalam and Hindi playback singer and music composer who has won several national awards. He has also judged other reality shows, such as Telugu Indian Idol, Sun Singer and Sa Re Ga Ma Pa Lil Champs.
Vijay Prakash	Kannada, Tamil, Telugu, Hindi and Malayalam playback singer and music composer, from Mysore (Karnataka). He has also judged in other singing shows such as Sa Re Ga Ma Pa Championship (Kannada), Sa Re Ga Ma Pa Kannada, Padutha Theeyaga (Telugu), Seniors Season 2, Seniors Season 3 and Li'l Champs Season 3.
Shweta Mohan	Malayalam, Tamil, Telugu, Kannada and Hindi playback singer. She is the daughter of playback singer Sujatha Mohan. Shweta Mohan has also judged other reality shows, including Super Singer 6, Super Singer 7 and Super Singer 9.
Abhirami (Guest Judge)	She has acted predominantly in Tamil and Malayalam films and few credits in Telugu and Kannada films. Abhirami went on to established herself as a leading actress in the 2000s across the Malayalam and Tamil language industries.

== Host ==
Host	Description
Archana Chandhoke	Archana is a Tamil radio personality, television presenter and actress. She has also hosted Seniors Season 3, Seniors Season 2, Seniors Season 1, Li'l Champs Season 3 and Mr. and Mrs. Chinnathirai Season 3. She had also participated as a housemate in Bigg Boss Season 4.

== Contestants ==
During the mega auditions round, the main judges, Srinivas, Saindhavi Prakash, Vijay Prakash & Shweta Mohan alongside the guest judge K. S. Ravikumar had selected several contestants who they acclaimed as eligible to participate in the season 4 of Sa Re Ga Ma Pa. The name and hometown of the contestants are:

#	Name	Hometown	Status
1	Balamurugan	Chidambaram	Non-competitor
2	Saran Sandy	Marakkanam	Eliminated
3	Pokkishiya Sandra	Yercaud, Salem	Eliminated
4	Sowmya Murugeswaran	Dharapuram	Eliminated
5	Sithanguna (Gunaalan)	Viluppuram	Eliminated
6	Abishiek Rajesh	Chennai	Eliminated
7	Shwetha Sristi	Chennai	1st Runner-Up
8	Medha Ramaswamy	Chennai	Eliminated
9	Magizhan Paridhi	Palladam	Winner
10	Jaya Bargavi S	Tiruchirappalli	Eliminated
11	R. S. Kiruthika	Chennai	Eliminated
12	R.Rajashruthi	Suchindram	Eliminated
13	Tha.Thavaseeli	Pattabiram	Eliminated
14	Ku.Sivasuriya	Mannargudi	Eliminated
15	Aarthy M.N Ashwin	Chennai	Eliminated
16	Su. Suriya	Sirkazhi	Eliminated
17	Ma. Ja. Guhapriyan	Mayiladuthurai	Eliminated
18	Pu. Mahathi	Chennai	Eliminated
19	Elumalai	Sakkara (Karnataka)	Eliminated
20	Yokesh Kaashyap	Kolar Gold Fields (Karnataka)	Eliminated
21	Sarath Saarz	Chennai	Eliminated
22	S. Tejashwini	Coimbatore	Eliminated
23	Karthikeyan	Tindivanam	Eliminated
24	Vignesh Varan	Pulicat	Eliminated
25	Harish Kaleeswaran	Ranipet	Eliminated
26	Mukesh Kumar	Chennai	Eliminated
27	Vijay Ija	Tirunelveli	Eliminated
28	Veerapandiyan	Viluppuram	2nd Runner-Up
29	A. Arishdor	Thanjavur	Eliminated
30	Ragavi	Tiruvallur	Eliminated
31	Eshwar Santhanalakshmi	Chengalpattu	Eliminated
32	Aman Sakha	Thrissur	Eliminated
33	Arulini Ashwiinaa Arumugam	Malaysia	Eliminated
34	Gopika Kesavan	Tiruvallur; Sri Lanka	Eliminated
35	Sharangha Varatharajan	Switzerland; Sri Lanka	Eliminated
36	Ramya Ramachandran	Canada; Sri Lanka	Eliminated
37	Archana Atputharajah	Switzerland; Sri Lanka	Eliminated
38	Keshika Amirthalingam	Australia; Sri Lanka	Eliminated
39	Vaishnavi	Singapore	Eliminated
40	Sithusayomi	Sri Lanka	Eliminated
41	Thivya Chandran	Malaysia	Eliminated
42	Rafsi Rafi	Palakkad	Eliminated
43	Vijaya Loshan	Sri Lanka	Eliminated
44	Indrajith	Sri Lanka	Eliminated

== Episodes ==
After every round has taken place, the judges would select the best performers of the week:

Episode Number	Air Date(s)	Round Name	Prize winners (weekly)	Special Guest(s) & Judge(s)
1	27 April 2024	Mega Blind Auditions		K. S. Ravikumar Shweta Mohan
2	28 April 2024	Mega Blind Auditions		K. S. Ravikumar Shweta Mohan
3	4 May 2024	Mega Blind Auditions		K. S. Ravikumar Shweta Mohan
4	5 May 2024	Mega Blind Auditions		K. S. Ravikumar Shweta Mohan
5	11 May 2024	Intro Round		
6	12 May 2024	Intro Round		
7	18 May 2024	Intro Round		
8	19 May 2024	Intro Round		
9	25 May 2024	Freestyle Round	1) Best Performer of the Week - Sarath Saarz and Shwetha Sristi 2) Energetic Performer of the Week - Veerapandiyan	(Cast of Thalaimai Seyalagam); Bharath (actor); Sriya Reddy; Dharsha Gupta; Shweta Mohan
10	26 May 2024	Freestyle Round	1) Best Performer of the Week - Sarath Saarz and Shwetha Sristi 2) Energetic Performer of the Week - Veerapandiyan	(Cast of Thalaimai Seyalagam); Bharath (actor); Sriya Reddy; Dharsha Gupta; Shweta Mohan
11	1 June 2024	காதலும் இசையும் Round (Kadhalum Isaiyum - Love songs)	1) Best Performer of the Week - Sarath Saarz 2) Fresh performance of the Week - Mukesh Kumar and Pokkishiya Sandra 3) Energetic Performer of the Week - Aman Sakha	
12	2 June 2024	காதலும் இசையும் Round (Kadhalum Isaiyum - Love songs)	1) Best Performer of the Week - Sarath Saarz 2) Fresh performance of the Week - Mukesh Kumar and Pokkishiya Sandra 3) Energetic Performer of the Week - Aman Sakha	
13	8 June 2024	நினைத்தாலே இனிக்கும் Round (Ninaithaale Inikum - Illaiyaraja songs)	1) Best Performer of the Week - Magizhan Paridhi 2) Fresh performance of the Week - Aman Sakha and Jayabharghavi Shankar 3) Energetic Performer of the Week - Vijay Ija	Karthik Raja
14	9 June 2024	நினைத்தாலே இனிக்கும் Round (Ninaithaale Inikum - Illaiyaraja songs)	1) Best Performer of the Week - Magizhan Paridhi 2) Fresh performance of the Week - Aman Sakha and Jayabharghavi Shankar 3) Energetic Performer of the Week - Vijay Ija	Karthik Raja
15	15 June 2024	மணிரத்னத்தின் மௌன ராகங்கள் (Mani Ratnam's Mouna Raangangal)	1) Best Performer of the Week - Aman Sakha 2) Fresh performance of the Week - Mukesh Kumar and Magizhan Paridhi 3) Energetic Performer of the Week - Veerapandiyan	Azhagam Perumal Annupamaa
16	16 June 2024	மணிரத்னத்தின் மௌன ராகங்கள் (Mani Ratnam's Mouna Raangangal)	1) Best Performer of the Week - Aman Sakha 2) Fresh performance of the Week - Mukesh Kumar and Magizhan Paridhi 3) Energetic Performer of the Week - Veerapandiyan	Azhagam Perumal Annupamaa
17	22 June 2024	Dedication Round	1) Best Performer of the Week - Magizhan Paridhi and Gopika Kesavan 2) Fresh performance of the Week - Pokkishiya Sandra, Jayabharghavi Shankar, Mukesh Kumar and Medha Ramaswamy 3) Energetic Performer of the Week - Saran Kumar and Vijaya Loshan	Abhirami (actress)
18	23 June 2024	Dedication Round	1) Best Performer of the Week - Magizhan Paridhi and Gopika Kesavan 2) Fresh performance of the Week - Pokkishiya Sandra, Jayabharghavi Shankar, Mukesh Kumar and Medha Ramaswamy 3) Energetic Performer of the Week - Saran Kumar and Vijaya Loshan	Abhirami (actress)
19	29 June 2024	Dedication Round	1) Best Performer of the Week - Magizhan Paridhi and Gopika Kesavan 2) Fresh performance of the Week - Pokkishiya Sandra, Jayabharghavi Shankar, Mukesh Kumar and Medha Ramaswamy 3) Energetic Performer of the Week - Saran Kumar and Vijaya Loshan	Abhirami (actress)
20	30 June 2024	Dedication Round	1) Best Performer of the Week - Magizhan Paridhi and Gopika Kesavan 2) Fresh performance of the Week - Pokkishiya Sandra, Jayabharghavi Shankar, Mukesh Kumar and Medha Ramaswamy 3) Energetic Performer of the Week - Saran Kumar and Vijaya Loshan	Abhirami (actress)
21	6 July 2024	Village Folk Round	1) Best Performer of the Week - Veerapandiyan and Gopika Kesavan 2) Fresh performance of the Week - Sarath Saarz and Mukesh Kumar 3) Energetic Performer of the Week - Jayabharghavi Shankar and Vijay Ija	
22	7 July 2024	Village Folk Round	1) Best Performer of the Week - Veerapandiyan and Gopika Kesavan 2) Fresh performance of the Week - Sarath Saarz and Mukesh Kumar 3) Energetic Performer of the Week - Jayabharghavi Shankar and Vijay Ija	
23	13 July 2024	பக்தி பாடல்கள் சுற்று (Bhakthi Songs)	1) Best Performer of the Week - Jayabharghavi Shankar 2) Fresh performance of the Week - Aman Sakha and Magizhan Paridhi 3) Energetic Performer of the Week - Sarath Saarz and Indrajith	Malathy Lakshman; Veeramani Raju; V.M. Mahalingam; T. M. S. Balraj
24	14 July 2024	பக்தி பாடல்கள் சுற்று (Bhakthi Songs)	1) Best Performer of the Week - Jayabharghavi Shankar 2) Fresh performance of the Week - Aman Sakha and Magizhan Paridhi 3) Energetic Performer of the Week - Sarath Saarz and Indrajith	Malathy Lakshman; Veeramani Raju; V.M. Mahalingam; T. M. S. Balraj
25	20 July 2024	Saregamapa Sangamam	1) Best Performer of the Week - Veerapandiyan and Akshaya Shivkumar 2) Fresh performance of the Week - Mukesh Kumar and Rikshitha Jawahar 3) Energetic Performer of the Week - Vijay Ija and Lakshana Ashokkumar	Kilmisha
26	21 July 2024	Saregamapa Sangamam	1) Best Performer of the Week - Veerapandiyan and Akshaya Shivkumar 2) Fresh performance of the Week - Mukesh Kumar and Rikshitha Jawahar 3) Energetic Performer of the Week - Vijay Ija and Lakshana Ashokkumar	Kilmisha
27	27 July 2024	Saregamapa Sangamam	1) Best Performer of the Week - Veerapandiyan and Akshaya Shivkumar 2) Fresh performance of the Week - Mukesh Kumar and Rikshitha Jawahar 3) Energetic Performer of the Week - Vijay Ija and Lakshana Ashokkumar	Kilmisha
28	28 July 2024	Retro Round	1) Best Performer of the Week - Magizhan Paridhi 2) Fresh performance of the Week - Gopika Kesavan and Sowmya Murugeswaran 3) Energetic Performer of the Week - Vijay Ija and Sarath Saarz	Poornima Bhagyaraj
29	3 August 2024	Retro Round	1) Best Performer of the Week - Magizhan Paridhi 2) Fresh performance of the Week - Gopika Kesavan and Sowmya Murugeswaran 3) Energetic Performer of the Week - Vijay Ija and Sarath Saarz	Poornima Bhagyaraj
30	4 August 2024	Retro Round	1) Best Performer of the Week - Magizhan Paridhi 2) Fresh performance of the Week - Gopika Kesavan and Sowmya Murugeswaran 3) Energetic Performer of the Week - Vijay Ija and Sarath Saarz	Poornima Bhagyaraj
31	10 August 2024	One on One Round		
32	11 August 2024	One on One Round		
33	17 August 2024	College Round	1) Best Performer of the Week - Aman Sakha 2) Fresh performance of the Week - Magizhan Paridhi and Mukesh Kumar 3) Energetic Performer of the Week - Vijay Ija 4) Lovely Performer of the Week - Gopika Kesavan and Shwetha Sristi 5) Vannamayamaana Paadagar - Sarath Saarz	Priya Bhavani Shankar
34	18 August 2024	College Round	1) Best Performer of the Week - Aman Sakha 2) Fresh performance of the Week - Magizhan Paridhi and Mukesh Kumar 3) Energetic Performer of the Week - Vijay Ija 4) Lovely Performer of the Week - Gopika Kesavan and Shwetha Sristi 5) Vannamayamaana Paadagar - Sarath Saarz	Priya Bhavani Shankar
35	24 August 2024	Celebrating Captain Vijayakanth	1) Best Performer of the Week - Veerapandiyan and Magizhan Paridhi 2) Fresh performance of the Week - Aman Sakha and Mukesh Kumar 3) Energetic Performer of the Week - Vijay Ija and Saran Sandy 4) Lovely Performer of the Week - Sowmya Murugeswaran and Shwetha Sristi 5) Vannamayamaana Paadagar - Sarath Saarz	Keerthy Suresh (Team of Demonte Colony 2); R. Ajay Gnanamuthu; Ravindra Vijay; Sam C. S. Shanmuga Pandian; Saran Kumar
36	25 August 2024	Celebrating Captain Vijayakanth	1) Best Performer of the Week - Veerapandiyan and Magizhan Paridhi 2) Fresh performance of the Week - Aman Sakha and Mukesh Kumar 3) Energetic Performer of the Week - Vijay Ija and Saran Sandy 4) Lovely Performer of the Week - Sowmya Murugeswaran and Shwetha Sristi 5) Vannamayamaana Paadagar - Sarath Saarz	Keerthy Suresh (Team of Demonte Colony 2); R. Ajay Gnanamuthu; Ravindra Vijay; Sam C. S. Shanmuga Pandian; Saran Kumar
37	31 August 2024	Wedding Songs (திருமண பாடல்கள்) Round	1) Best Performer of the Week - Gopika Kesavan 2) Fresh performance of the Week - Sarath Saarz and Mukesh Kumar 3) Energetic Performer of the Week - Saran Sandy and Veerapandiyan 4) Lovely Performer of the Week - Jayabharghavi Shankar 5) Vannamayamaana Paadagar - Magizhan Paridhi	Abhirami (actress)
38	1 September 2024	Wedding Songs (திருமண பாடல்கள்) Round	1) Best Performer of the Week - Gopika Kesavan 2) Fresh performance of the Week - Sarath Saarz and Mukesh Kumar 3) Energetic Performer of the Week - Saran Sandy and Veerapandiyan 4) Lovely Performer of the Week - Jayabharghavi Shankar 5) Vannamayamaana Paadagar - Magizhan Paridhi	Abhirami (actress)
39	7 September 2024	Road to Finale Unplugged Round	1) Best Performer of the Week - Shwetha Sristi 2) Fresh performance of the Week - Veerapandiyan and Sarath Saarz 3) Energetic Performer of the Week - Magizhan Paridhi 4) Lovely Performer of the Week - Jayabharghavi Shankar 5) Vannamayamaana Paadagar - Sowmya Murugeswaran	Jayam Ravi; VTV Ganesh (Team of The Greatest of All Time); Yuvan Shankar Raja; Stephen Devassy; Venkat Prabhu; Premgi Amaren Vrusha Balu
40	8 September 2024	Road to Finale Unplugged Round	1) Best Performer of the Week - Shwetha Sristi 2) Fresh performance of the Week - Veerapandiyan and Sarath Saarz 3) Energetic Performer of the Week - Magizhan Paridhi 4) Lovely Performer of the Week - Jayabharghavi Shankar 5) Vannamayamaana Paadagar - Sowmya Murugeswaran	Jayam Ravi; VTV Ganesh (Team of The Greatest of All Time); Yuvan Shankar Raja; Stephen Devassy; Venkat Prabhu; Premgi Amaren Vrusha Balu
41	14 September 2024	Hero Heroine Round	First finalist – Magizhan Paridhi 1) Best Performer of the Week - Aman Sakha 2) Fresh performance of the Week - Sarath Saarz 3) Energetic Performer of the Week - Vijay Ija 4) Lovely Performer of the Week - Arulini Ashwiinaa Arumugam 5) Vannamayamaana Paadagar - Magizhan Paridhi	Abhirami (actress)
42	15 September 2024	Hero Heroine Round	First finalist – Magizhan Paridhi 1) Best Performer of the Week - Aman Sakha 2) Fresh performance of the Week - Sarath Saarz 3) Energetic Performer of the Week - Vijay Ija 4) Lovely Performer of the Week - Arulini Ashwiinaa Arumugam 5) Vannamayamaana Paadagar - Magizhan Paridhi	Abhirami (actress)
43	21 September 2024	Celebrating SPB Round	Second finalist – Shwetha Sristi 1) Best Performer of the Week - Gopika Kesavan; 2) Fresh performance of the Week - Jayabharghavi Shankar 3) Energetic Performer of the Week - Saran Sandy 4) Lovely Performer of the Week - Shwetha Sristi 5) Vannamayamaana Paadagar - Mukesh Kumar	S. P. Charan Bosskey Ananthu (singer)
44	22 September 2024	Celebrating SPB Round	Second finalist – Shwetha Sristi 1) Best Performer of the Week - Gopika Kesavan; 2) Fresh performance of the Week - Jayabharghavi Shankar 3) Energetic Performer of the Week - Saran Sandy 4) Lovely Performer of the Week - Shwetha Sristi 5) Vannamayamaana Paadagar - Mukesh Kumar	S. P. Charan Bosskey Ananthu (singer)
45	28 September 2024	Celebrating AR Rahman Round	Third finalist - Sarath Saarz 1) Best Performer of the Week - Aman Sakha; 2) Fresh performance of the Week - Sarath Saarz 3) Energetic Performer of the Week - Vijay Ija 4) Lovely Performer of the Week - Jayabharghavi Shankar 5) Vannamayamaana Paadagar - Gopika Kesavan	Pyramid Natarajan Vasanth
46	29 September 2024	Celebrating AR Rahman Round	Third finalist - Sarath Saarz 1) Best Performer of the Week - Aman Sakha; 2) Fresh performance of the Week - Sarath Saarz 3) Energetic Performer of the Week - Vijay Ija 4) Lovely Performer of the Week - Jayabharghavi Shankar 5) Vannamayamaana Paadagar - Gopika Kesavan	Pyramid Natarajan Vasanth
47	5 October 2024	கிராமத்து மன்வாசனை Round	Fourth finalist - Aman Sakha Fifth finalist - Saran Sandy	Pushpavanam Kuppusamy Chinnaponnu
48	6 October 2024	கிராமத்து மன்வாசனை Round	Fourth finalist - Aman Sakha Fifth finalist - Saran Sandy	Pushpavanam Kuppusamy Chinnaponnu
49	12 October 2024	Freestyle Round	Sixth finalist - Veerapandiyan	Yugendran
50	13 October 2024	Freestyle Round	Sixth finalist - Veerapandiyan	Yugendran
51	20 October 2024	Grand Finale	Title Winner - Magizhan Paridhi 1st Runner Up - Shwetha Sristi 2nd Runner Up - Veerapandiyan	Harris Jayaraj

== Set performances ==
Set performances with the name of contestant, name of film/album, name of composer, and their status are:

=== Mega Blind Auditions (episodes 1 and 2) ===
Name of contestant(s)	Name of song	Lyricist	Name of Film/Album	Singer(s)	Composer(s)	Round Status
Magizhan Paridhi	Adiye Neethaaanadi	GKB	Bachelor	Kapil Kapilan	Dhibu Ninan Thomas	Golden performer - progress to next round
Jaya Bargavi S	Aalanguyil Koovum Rayyil	Kabilan	Parthiban Kanavu	Harini, Srikanth	Vidyasagar	Golden performer - progress to next round
R. S. Kiruthika	Sandakkozhi Kozhi	Vairamuthu	Aayutha Ezhuthu	Madhushree, A. R. Rahman	A. R. Rahman	Rejected
Elumalai	Vanthenda Paalkaran	Vairamuthu	Annaamalai	S. P. Balasubrahmanyam	Deva	Rejected
Sithanguna (Gunaalan)	Ore Oru Oorukkulle	Snehan	Thavamai Thavamirundhu	Sabesh, Jayakumar	Sabesh–Murali	Golden performer - progress to next round
Sowmya Murugeswaran	Maalai Pozhuthin Mayakkathile	Kannadasan	Bhagyalakshmi	P. Susheela	Viswanathan–Ramamoorthy	Golden performer - progress to next round
Sharangha Varatharajan	Silendra Theepori Ondru	Vairamuthu	Thithikudhe	Sujatha Mohan	Vidyasagar	Selected from waiting list
Saran Sandy	Thala Kodhum	Raju Murugan	Jai Bhim	Pradeep Kumar	Sean Roldan	Golden performer - progress to next round
Shwetha Sristi	Ammadi Ammadi	Yugabharathi	Desingu Raja	Shreya Ghoshal	D. Imman	Golden performer - progress to next round
Abishiek Rajesh	Thalaattum Kaatre	Vairamuthu	Poovellam Un Vaasam	Shankar Mahadevan	Vidyasagar	Golden performer - progress to next round
Rafsi Rafi	Kannu Rendum	Viveka	Kutty	Priya Himesh, Mukesh Mohamed	Devi Sri Prasad	Golden performer - progress to next round
Balamurgan	Idhayam Oru Kovil	Ilaiyaraaja	Idaya Kovil	Ilaiyaraaja (version 1) S. P. Balasubrahmanyam, S. Janaki (version 2)	Ilaiyaraaja	Golden performer - progress to next round
R.Rajashruthi	Ey Sandakaara	Vivek	Irudhi Suttru	Dhee	Santhosh Narayanan	Rejected
Tha.Thavaseeli	Soppanasundari	Arunraja Kamaraj	Veera Sivaji	Vaikom Vijayalakshmi	D. Imman	Rejected
Indrajith	Nandha En Nila	Iraa. Pazhanisami	Nandha En Nila	S. P. Balasubrahmanyam	V. Dakshinamoorthy	Golden performer - progress to next round
Ku.Sivasuriya	Aarariraro	Snehan	Raam	K. J. Yesudas	Yuvan Shankar Raja	Rejected
Aarthy M.N Ashwin	Nenjukkule	Vairamuthu	Kadal	Shakthisree Gopalan, A. R. Rahman	A. R. Rahman	Rejected
Su. Suriya	Roja Roja	Vaali	Kadhalar Dhinam	P. Unnikrishnan (version 1) Hariharan (version 2)	A. R. Rahman	Rejected
Ma. Ja. Guhapriyan	Kannamma	Uma Devi	Kaala	Pradeep Kumar, Dhee, Ananthu	Santhosh Narayanan	Rejected
Medha Ramaswamy	Ninaithu Ninaithu Parthal	Na. Muthukumar	7G Rainbow Colony	Shreya Ghoshal	Yuvan Shankar Raja	Golden performer - progress to next round
Pu. Mahathi	Evano Oruvan	Vairamuthu	Alai Payuthey	Swarnalatha	A. R. Rahman	Selected from waiting list
	Uyirin Uyirae	Thamarai	Kaakha Kaakha	KK, Suchitra	Harris Jayaraj	Rejected

=== Mega Blind Auditions (episodes 3 and 4) ===
Name of contestant(s)	Name of song	Lyricist	Name of Film/Album	Singer(s)	Composer(s)	Round Status
Aman Sakha	Nee Kavithaigala	GKB	Maragadha Naanayam	Pradeep Kumar	Dhibu Ninan Thomas	Golden performer - progress to next round
Sarath Saarz	Kadhal Kanave	GKB	Mundasupatti	Pradeep Kumar, Kalyani Nair	Sean Roldan	Golden performer - progress to next round
Gopika Kesavan	Thendral Vanthu Theendumbothu	Vaali	Avatharam	S. Janaki, Ilaiyaraaja, Ganesh Manivannan	Ilaiyaraaja	Golden performer - progress to next round
Keshika Amirthalingam	Malligai En Mannan	Vaali	Dheerga Sumangali	Vani Jairam	M. S. Viswanathan	Rejected
Sithusayomi	Aathadi Aathadi	Vairamuthu	Anegan	Bhavatharini, Tippu, Dhanush, Abhay Jodhpurkar	Harris Jayaraj	Rejected
Thivya Chandran	Nenjodu	Na. Muthukumar	Kaadhal Kondein	P. Unnikrishnan, Sujatha Mohan	Yuvan Shankar Raja	Rejected
S. Tejashwini	Akkam Pakkam	Na. Muthukumar	Kireedam	Sadhana Sargam	G. V. Prakash Kumar	Rejected
Karthikeyan	Aasai Oru Pulveli	Kabilan	Attakathi	Pradeep Kumar, Kalyani Nair	Santhosh Narayanan	Golden performer - progress to next round
Arulini Ashwiinaa Arumugam	Allegra	Viveka	Kanthaswamy	Rita Thyagarajan	Devi Sri Prasad	Golden performer - progress to next round
Vignesh Varan	Arjunaru Villu	Kabilan	Ghilli	Sukhwinder Singh, Manikka Vinayagam	Vidyasagar	Golden performer - progress to next round
Harish Kaleeswaran	Sendhamizh Thenmozhiyaal	Kannadasan	Maalaiyitta Mangai	T. R. Mahalingam	Viswanathan–Ramamoorthy	Golden performer - progress to next round
Mukesh Kumar	Mun Paniyaa	Palani Bharathi	Nandhaa	S. P. Balasubrahmanyam, Malgudi Subha	Yuvan Shankar Raja	Golden performer - progress to next round
Vijay Ija	Ei Suzhali	Vivek	Kodi	Vijaynarain Rangarajan	Santhosh Narayanan	Golden performer - progress to next round
Veerapandiyan	Aagaya Thamarai	Vaali	Nadodi Pattukkaran	S. Janaki, Ilaiyaraaja	Ilaiyaraaja	Golden performer - progress to next round
Pokkishiya Sandra	Who's The Hero	Kamal Haasan	Manmadan Ambu	Andrea Jeremiah	Devi Sri Prasad	Golden performer - progress to next round
Vijaya Loshan	Aval Ulaghazhagi	Vaali	Lesa Lesa	Karthik	Harris Jayaraj	Golden performer - progress to next round
Vaishnavi	Yaarumilla	Pa. Vijay	Kaaviya Thalaivan	Shweta Mohan, Srinivas	A. R. Rahman	Rejected
A. Arishdor	Maane Maane	Anthony Daasan	Uriyadi	Anthony Daasan, Masala Coffee	Anthony Daasan	Rejected
Ragavi	Senthoora	Thamarai	Bogan	Luksimi Sivaneswaralingam	D. Imman	Rejected
Yokesh Kaashyap	Unnai Kaanadhu Naan	Kamal Haasan	Vishwaroopam	Kamal Haasan, Shankar Mahadevan	Shankar–Ehsaan–Loy	Rejected
Ramya Ramachandran	Kalaarasiga	Vairamuthu	Raanjhanaa / Ambikapathy	Shweta Mohan, Sharanya Srinivas	A. R. Rahman	Rejected
Archana Atputharajah	Gaana Karunkuyile	Ponnadiyan	Sethu	Kovai Kamala	Ilaiyaraaja	Rejected
Eshwar Santhanalakshmi	Poonkatrae	Palani Bharathi	Friends	Hariharan	Ilaiyaraaja	Rejected

=== Intro Round (episodes 5 and 6) ===
Name of contestant(s)	Name of song	Lyricist	Name of Film/Album	Singer(s)	Composer(s)	Round Status
Magizhan Paridhi	Aagayam Theepidicha	Kabilan	Madras	Pradeep Kumar	Santhosh Narayanan	Golden performer - progress to next round
Sowmya Murugeswaran	Thirumana Malargal	Vairamuthu	Poovellam Un Vaasam	Swarnalatha	Vidyasagar	Golden performer - progress to next round
Sithanguna (Gunaalan)	Odakara Orathile	Anthony Daasan	Anthony in Party	Anthony Daasan	Anthony Daasan	Progress to next round
Balamurugan	Paadum Pothu Naan	Pulamaipithan	Netru Indru Naalai	S. P. Balasubrahmanyam	M. S. Viswanathan	Golden performer - progress to next round
Indrajith	Vaan Nila Nila	Kannadasan	Pattina Pravesam	S. P. Balasubrahmanyam (version 1) L. R. Anjali (version 2)	M. S. Viswanathan	Golden performer - progress to next round
Vijay Ija	Arabu Naade	Vaali	Thottal Poo Malarum	Haricharan, Yuvan Shankar Raja	Yuvan Shankar Raja	Progress to next round
Pu. Mahathi	Ven Megham (Nanare) / Barso Re	Vairamuthu	Guru	Shreya Ghoshal, Udhai Mazumdar	A. R. Rahman	Progress to next round
Medha Ramaswamy	Yaarumilla	Pa. Vijay	Kaaviya Thalaivan	Shweta Mohan, Srinivas	A. R. Rahman	Progress to next round
Shwetha Sristi	Mallipoo	Thamarai	Vendhu Thanindhathu Kaadu	Madhushree	A. R. Rahman	Progress to next round
Abishiek Rajesh	Thaniye Thannanthaniye ( Carnatic raga: Ananda Bhairavi )	Vairamuthu	Rhythm	Shankar Mahadevan	A. R. Rahman	Golden performer - progress to next round
Pokkishiya Sandra	Kannamoochi Yenada	Vairamuthu	Kandukondain Kandukondain	K. S. Chithra, K. J. Yesudas	A. R. Rahman	Golden performer - progress to next round
Vijaya Loshan	Oru Maalai	Thamarai	Ghajini	Karthik	Harris Jayaraj	Golden performer - progress to next round

=== Intro Round (episodes 7 and 8) ===
Name of contestant(s)	Name of song	Lyricist	Name of Film/Album	Singer(s)	Composer(s)	Round Status
Saran Sandy	Ayayayoo Aananthamey	Yugabharathi	Kumki	Haricharan	D. Imman	Progress to next round
Karthikeyan	Mellinamae Mellinamae	Vairamuthu	Shahjahan	Harish Raghavendra	Mani Sharma	Progress to next round
Vignesh Varan	Elo Machi	Vairamuthu	Anbe Sivam	Kamal Haasan, Udit Narayan (version 1) Udit Narayan, Tippu (version 2)	Vidyasagar	Golden performer - progress to next round
Harish Kaleeswaran	Elo Machi	Vairamuthu	Anbe Sivam	Kamal Haasan, Udit Narayan (version 1) Udit Narayan, Tippu (version 2)	Vidyasagar	Golden performer - progress to next round
Sarath Saarz	Kadhal Sadugudu	Vairamuthu	Alai Payuthey	S. P. Charan, Naveen	A. R. Rahman	Golden performer - progress to next round
Sharangha Varatharajan	Swasame Swasame	Pa. Vijay (lyricist)	Thenali	S. P. Balasubrahmanyam, Sadhana Sargam	A. R. Rahman	Golden performer - progress to next round
Gopika Kesavan	Kanna Kaattu Podhum	Yugabharathi	Rekka	Shreya Ghoshal	D. Imman	Golden performer - progress to next round
Aman Sakha	Kangal Edho	Yugabharathi	Chithha	Pradeep Kumar, Karthika Vaidyanathan	Dhibu Ninan Thomas	Progress to next round
Rafsi Rafi	Megathoodham	Thamarai	Airaa	Padmapriya Raghavan, Viswanathan Krishnamoorthy	Sundarmurthy KS	Progress to next round
Jaya Bargavi S	Naane Varugiren	Vairamuthu	O Kadhal Kanmani	Shashaa Tirupati, Sathya Prakash	A. R. Rahman	Golden performer - progress to next round
Arulini Ashwiinaa Arumugam	Konjum Mainakkale	Vairamuthu	Kandukondain Kandukondain	Sadhana Sargam	A. R. Rahman	Golden performer - progress to next round
Mukesh Kumar	Enna Solla Pogirai	Vairamuthu	Kandukondain Kandukondain	Shankar Mahadevan	A. R. Rahman	Golden performer - progress to next round
Veerapandiyan	Ariyadha Vayasu	Snehan	Paruthiveeran	Ilaiyaraaja, Derrick	Yuvan Shankar Raja	Golden performer - progress to next round

=== Freestyle Round (episodes 9 and 10) ===
Name of contestant(s)	Name of song	Lyricist	Name of Film/Album	Singer(s)	Composer(s)	Round Status (including scores)
Pu. Mahathi	Naan Pogiren	Thamarai	Naanayam	S. P. Balasubrahmanyam, K. S. Chithra	James Vasanthan	Karthik - 8/10; Saindhavi - 9/10; Shweta Mohan - 8/10
Vijay Ija	Naan Pogiren	Thamarai	Naanayam	S. P. Balasubrahmanyam, K. S. Chithra	James Vasanthan	Karthik - 8/10; Saindhavi - 8.5/10; Shweta Mohan - 7.5/10 (Danger Zone)
Abishiek Rajesh	Andangkaka Kondakari	Vairamuthu	Anniyan	Jassie Gift, KK, Saindhavi, Shreya Ghoshal	Harris Jayaraj	Karthik - 8.5/10; Saindhavi - 8.5/10; Shweta Mohan - 7.5/10
Rafsi Rafi	Andangkaka Kondakari	Vairamuthu	Anniyan	Jassie Gift, KK, Saindhavi, Shreya Ghoshal	Harris Jayaraj	Karthik - 7.5/10; Saindhavi - 8.5/10; Shweta Mohan - 9/10 (Eliminated)
Medha Ramaswamy	Thoda Thoda Malarndhadhenna	Vairamuthu	Indira	S. P. Balasubrahmanyam, K. S. Chithra	A. R. Rahman	Golden performer - progress to next round
Indrajith	Thoda Thoda Malarndhadhenna	Vairamuthu	Indira	S. P. Balasubrahmanyam, K. S. Chithra	A. R. Rahman	Karthik - 7.5/10; Saindhavi - 8/10; Shweta Mohan - 7.5/10
Pokkishiya Sandra	Mukkala Mukkabla	Vaali	Kadhalan	Mano, Swarnalatha	A. R. Rahman	Golden performer - progress to next round
Vijaya Loshan	Mukkala Mukkabla	Vaali	Kadhalan	Mano, Swarnalatha	A. R. Rahman	Golden performer - progress to next round
Sithanguna (Gunaalan)	Engum Pugazh Thuvanga	Chinnasamydasan (Vallanadu), Mari Selvaraj	Pariyerum Perumal	Anthony Daasan, Mariappan	Santhosh Narayanan	Golden performer - progress to next round
Saran Sandy	Engum Pugazh Thuvanga	Chinnasamydasan (Vallanadu), Mari Selvaraj	Pariyerum Perumal	Anthony Daasan, Mariappan	Santhosh Narayanan	Karthik - 7.5/10; Saindhavi - 8/10; Shweta Mohan - 8/10 (Danger Zone)
Sarath Saarz	Pookkalae Sattru Oyivedungal	Madhan Karky	I	Haricharan, Shreya Ghoshal	A. R. Rahman	Platinum performer - progress to next round
Shwetha Sristi	Pookkalae Sattru Oyivedungal	Madhan Karky	I	Haricharan, Shreya Ghoshal	A. R. Rahman	Platinum performer - progress to next round
Veerapandiyan	Kaattumalli	Ilaiyaraaja	Viduthalai Part 1	Ilaiyaraaja, Ananya Bhat	Ilaiyaraaja	Golden performer - progress to next round
Gopika Kesavan	Kaattumalli	Ilaiyaraaja	Viduthalai Part 1	Ilaiyaraaja, Ananya Bhat	Ilaiyaraaja	Karthik - 8.5/10; Saindhavi - 9/10; Shweta Mohan - 8/10
Vignesh Varan	Aalaporaan Thamizhan	Vivek	Mersal	Kailash Kher, Pooja Vaidyanath, Sathyaprakash Dharmar, Deepak Blue	A. R. Rahman	Karthik - 7/10; Saindhavi - 8/10; Shweta Mohan - 8.5/10 (Eliminated)
Harish Kaleeswaran	Aalaporaan Thamizhan	Vivek	Mersal	Kailash Kher, Pooja Vaidyanath, Sathyaprakash Dharmar, Deepak Blue	A. R. Rahman	Karthik - 7/10; Saindhavi - 8/10; Shweta Mohan - 8.5/10 (Eliminated)
Jaya Bargavi S	Kaatre En Vasal ( Carnatic raga: Dabari Kanada )	Vairamuthu	Rhythm	P. Unnikrishnan, Kavita Krishnamurti	A. R. Rahman	Golden performer - progress to next round
Magizhan Paridhi	Kaatre En Vasal ( Carnatic raga: Dabari Kanada )	Vairamuthu	Rhythm	P. Unnikrishnan, Kavita Krishnamurti	A. R. Rahman	Golden performer - progress to next round
Karthikeyan	Kadhal Anukkal	Vairamuthu	Enthiran	Vijay Prakash, Shreya Ghoshal	A. R. Rahman	Karthik - 8/10; Saindhavi - 8.5/10; Shweta Mohan - 8/10
Akshaya Shivkumar	Kadhal Anukkal	Vairamuthu	Enthiran	Vijay Prakash, Shreya Ghoshal	A. R. Rahman	Karthik - 8/10; Saindhavi - 8.5/10; Shweta Mohan - 8/10
Mukesh Kumar	Kurukku Chiruththavale, Ulundhu Vithakkaiyilae	Vairamuthu	Mudhalvan	Hariharan, Mahalakshmi Iyer, Srinivas, Swarnalatha	A. R. Rahman	Golden performer - progress to next round
Sharangha Varatharajan	Kurukku Chiruththavale, Ulundhu Vithakkaiyilae	Vairamuthu	Mudhalvan	Hariharan, Mahalakshmi Iyer, Srinivas, Swarnalatha	A. R. Rahman	Golden performer - progress to next round
Aman Sakha	Adi Nenthikkitten	Palani Bharathi	Star	Karthik, Chitra Iyer	A. R. Rahman	Golden performer - progress to next round
Arulini Ashwiinaa Arumugam	Adi Nenthikkitten	Palani Bharathi	Star	Karthik, Chitra Iyer	A. R. Rahman	Golden performer - progress to next round
Sowmya Murugeswaran	Aayiram Nilave Vaa	Pulamaipithan	Adimai Penn	S. P. Balasubrahmanyam, P. Susheela	K. V. Mahadevan	Golden performer - progress to next round
Balamurugan	Aayiram Nilave Vaa	Pulamaipithan	Adimai Penn	S. P. Balasubrahmanyam, P. Susheela	K. V. Mahadevan	Golden performer - progress to next round

=== காதலும் இசையும் Round (episodes 11 and 12) ===
Name of contestant(s)	Name of song	Lyricist	Name of Film/Album	Singer(s)	Composer(s)	Round Status (including scores)
Karthikeyan	Mundhinam Parthene	Thamarai	Vaaranam Aayiram	Naresh Iyer, Prashanthini	Harris Jayaraj	Karthik - 8.5/10; Saindhavi - 8.5/10; Vijay Prakash - 9/10
Pu. Mahathi	Mundhinam Parthene	Thamarai	Vaaranam Aayiram	Naresh Iyer, Prashanthini	Harris Jayaraj	Karthik - 7.5/10; Saindhavi - 8/10; Vijay Prakash - 8.5/10 (Eliminated)
Shwetha Sristi	O Butterfly	Vaali	Meera	S. P. Balasubrahmanyam, Asha Bhosle	Ilaiyaraaja	Karthik - 8.5/10; Saindhavi - 9/10; Vijay Prakash - 8/10
Vijaya Loshan	O Butterfly	Vaali	Meera	S. P. Balasubrahmanyam, Asha Bhosle	Ilaiyaraaja	Karthik - 8.5/10; Saindhavi - 8.5/10; Vijay Prakash - 8.5/10
Balamurugan	Maniyae Manikuyilae		Nadodi Thendral	Mano, S. Janaki	Ilaiyaraaja	Karthik - 9/10; Saindhavi - 9/10; Vijay Prakash - 9/10
Shamala Devi	Maniyae Manikuyilae		Nadodi Thendral	Mano, S. Janaki	Ilaiyaraaja	Karthik - 9/10; Saindhavi - 9/10; Vijay Prakash - 9/10
Sithanguna (Gunaalan)	Rosappu Chinna Rosappu	Ra. Ravishankar	Surya Vamsam	Hariharan (version 1) Sujatha Mohan (version 2)	S. A. Rajkumar	Golden performer - progress to next round
Mukesh Kumar	Pookal Pookum Tharunam	Na. Muthukumar	Madrasapattinam	Roopkumar Rathod, Harini, Andrea Jeremiah, G. V. Prakash Kumar	G. V. Prakash Kumar	Golden performer - progress to next round
Pokkishiya Sandra	Pookal Pookum Tharunam	Na. Muthukumar	Madrasapattinam	Roopkumar Rathod, Harini, Andrea Jeremiah, G. V. Prakash Kumar	G. V. Prakash Kumar	Golden performer - progress to next round
Saran Sandy	Kodi Aruvi	Yugabharathi	Mehandi Circus	Pradeep Kumar, Nithyashree Venkataraman	Sean Roldan	Golden performer - progress to next round
Raagawarshini	Kodi Aruvi	Yugabharathi	Mehandi Circus	Pradeep Kumar, Nithyashree Venkataraman	Sean Roldan	Golden performer - progress to next round
Abishiek Rajesh	Suthi Suthi	Vairamuthu	Padayappa	S. P. Balasubrahmanyam, Harini, Savitha Radhakrishnan	A. R. Rahman	Golden performer - progress to next round
Arulini Ashwiinaa Arumugam	Suthi Suthi	Vairamuthu	Padayappa	S. P. Balasubrahmanyam, Harini, Savitha Radhakrishnan	A. R. Rahman	Golden performer - progress to next round
Gopika Kesavan	Enakkaaga Poranthaayae	Vaali	Pannaiyarum Padminiyum	S. P. Charan, Anu Anand	Justin Prabhakaran	Karthik - 9/10; Saindhavi - 9/10; Vijay Prakash - 9/10
Jaya Bargavi S	Ayyayyo	Snehan	Paruthiveeran	Manikka Vinayagam, Shreya Ghoshal, Yuvan Shankar Raja, Krishnaraj	Yuvan Shankar Raja	Golden performer - progress to next round
Vijay Ija	Ayyayyo	Snehan	Paruthiveeran	Manikka Vinayagam, Shreya Ghoshal, Yuvan Shankar Raja, Krishnaraj	Yuvan Shankar Raja	Karthik - 8.5/10; Saindhavi - 8.5/10; Vijay Prakash - 7.5/10 (Danger zone)
Aman Sakha	Urugi Urugi	Vignesh Ramakrishna	Joe	Anand Aravindakshan (version 1) Nalini Vittobane (version 2)	Siddhu Kumar	Golden performer - progress to next round
Sarath Saarz	Innum Konjam Naeram	Kabilan, A. R. Rahman	Maryan	Vijay Prakash, Shweta Mohan	A. R. Rahman	Golden performer - progress to next round
Sharangha Varatharajan	Innum Konjam Naeram	Kabilan, A. R. Rahman	Maryan	Vijay Prakash, Shweta Mohan	A. R. Rahman	Karthik - 9/10; Saindhavi - 8.5/10; Vijay Prakash - 9/10
Magizhan Paridhi	Aaruyire	Na. Muthukumar	Madrasapattinam	Sonu Nigam, Saindhavi	G. V. Prakash Kumar	Golden performer - progress to next round
Medha Ramaswamy	Aaruyire	Na. Muthukumar	Madrasapattinam	Sonu Nigam, Saindhavi	G. V. Prakash Kumar	Golden performer - progress to next round

=== நினைத்தாலே இனிக்கும் Round (episodes 13 and 14) ===
Name of contestant(s)	Name of song	Lyricist	Name of Film/Album	Singer(s)	Composer(s)	Round Status (including scores)
Sithanguna (Gunaalan)	Yerikkarai Poongaatre Nee Pora Vazhi	Chidambaranathan	Thooral Ninnu Pochchu	K. J. Yesudas	Ilaiyaraaja	Karthik - 8.5/10; Saindhavi - 8.5/10; Vijay Prakash - 9/10
Jaya Bargavi S	Ore Naal Unnai Naan	Vaali	Ilamai Oonjal Aadukirathu	S. P. Balasubrahmanyam, Vani Jairam	Ilaiyaraaja	Golden performer - progress to next round
Saran Sandy	Ore Naal Unnai Naan	Vaali	Ilamai Oonjal Aadukirathu	S. P. Balasubrahmanyam, Vani Jairam	Ilaiyaraaja	Karthik - 8.5/10; Saindhavi - 8/10; Vijay Prakash - 8.5/10
Shwetha Sristi	Ennai Thottu	Piraisoodan	Unna Nenachen Pattu Padichen	S. P. Balasubrahmanyam, Swarnalatha	Ilaiyaraaja	Karthik - 8.5/10; Saindhavi - 8.5/10; Vijay Prakash - 8.5/10
Balamurugan	Ennai Thottu	Piraisoodan	Unna Nenachen Pattu Padichen	S. P. Balasubrahmanyam, Swarnalatha	Ilaiyaraaja	Karthik - 9/10; Saindhavi - 9/10; Vijay Prakash - 9/10
Arulini Ashwiinaa Arumugam	Poovarasampoo Poothachu	Gangai Amaran	Kizhakke Pogum Rail	S. Janaki	Ilaiyaraaja	Golden performer - progress to next round
Vijay Ija	Madai Thiranthu	Vaali	Nizhalgal	S. P. Balasubrahmanyam	Ilaiyaraaja	Golden performer - progress to next round
Gopika Kesavan	Yennullil Yengo	Gangai Amaran	Rosappu Ravikkaikari	Vani Jairam	Ilaiyaraaja	Karthik - 8.5/10; Saindhavi - 8.5/10; Vijay Prakash - 9/10
Sarath Saarz	Andhi Mazhai Pozhikirathu	Vairamuthu	Raja Paarvai	S. P. Balasubrahmanyam, S. Janaki, T. V. Gopalakrishnan	Ilaiyaraaja	Karthik - 9/10; Saindhavi - 9.5/10; Vijay Prakash - 9/10
Pokkishiya Sandra	Andhi Mazhai Pozhikirathu	Vairamuthu	Raja Paarvai	S. P. Balasubrahmanyam, S. Janaki, T. V. Gopalakrishnan	Ilaiyaraaja	Karthik - 8.5/10; Saindhavi - 8.5/10; Vijay Prakash - 8.5/10
Indrajith	Ilamai Enum Poongaatru	Kannadasan	Pagalil Oru Iravu	S. P. Balasubrahmanyam	Ilaiyaraaja	Karthik - 8.5/10; Saindhavi - 8.5/10; Vijay Prakash - 8.5/10
Karthikeyan	Uravugal Thodarkathai	Gangai Amaran	Aval Appadithan	K. J. Yesudas	Ilaiyaraaja	Golden performer - progress to next round
Mukesh Kumar	Rakkamma Kaiya Thattu	Vaali	Thalapathi	S. P. Balasubrahmanyam, Swarnalatha	Ilaiyaraaja	Golden performer - progress to next round
Medha Ramaswamy	Rakkamma Kaiya Thattu	Vaali	Thalapathi	S. P. Balasubrahmanyam, Swarnalatha	Ilaiyaraaja	Golden performer - progress to next round
Veerapandiyan	Enge Sellum Intha Paathai	Arivumathi	Sethu	Ilaiyaraaja	Ilaiyaraaja	Golden performer - progress to next round
Aman Sakha	Yen Iniya Pon Nilavae	Gangai Amaran	Moodu Pani	K. J. Yesudas	Ilaiyaraaja	Golden performer - progress to next round
Magizhan Paridhi	Pottu Vaitha Kathal Thittam	Vaali	Singaravelan	Kamal Haasan, Arunmozhi, Saibaba	Ilaiyaraaja	Golden performer - progress to next round
Sowmya Murugeswaran	Innum Ennai Enna Seiyapogirai	R. V. Udayakumar	Singaravelan	S. P. Balasubrahmanyam, S. Janaki	Ilaiyaraaja	Progress to next round
Vijaya Loshan	Innum Ennai Enna Seiyapogirai	R. V. Udayakumar	Singaravelan	S. P. Balasubrahmanyam, S. Janaki	Ilaiyaraaja	Progress to next round

=== மணிரத்னத்தின் மௌன ராகங்கள் (episodes 15 and 16) ===
Name of contestant(s)	Name of song	Lyricist	Name of Film/Album	Singer(s)	Composer(s)	Round Status (including scores)
Sowmya Murugeswaran	Rukkumani Rukkumani	Vairamuthu	Roja	S. P. Balasubrahmanyam, K. S. Chithra	A. R. Rahman	Golden performer - progress to next round
Indrajith	Rukkumani Rukkumani	Vairamuthu	Roja	S. P. Balasubrahmanyam, K. S. Chithra	A. R. Rahman	Golden performer - progress to next round
Saran Sandy	Kaattukuyilu Manasukkulae	Vaali	Thalapathi	S. P. Balasubrahmanyam, K. J. Yesudas	Ilaiyaraaja	Karthik - 8.5/10; Saindhavi - 8.5/10; Vijay Prakash - 8.5/10
Sithanguna (Gunaalan)	Kaattukuyilu Manasukkulae	Vaali	Thalapathi	S. P. Balasubrahmanyam, K. J. Yesudas	Ilaiyaraaja	Karthik - 8/10; Saindhavi - 8/10; Vijay Prakash - 8/10 (Eliminated)
Gopika Kesavan	Chinna Thayaval	Vaali	Thalapathi	S. Janaki	Ilaiyaraaja	Golden performer - progress to next round
Aman Sakha	Kaadhal Rojave	Vairamuthu	Roja	S. P. Balasubrahmanyam, Sujatha Mohan	A. R. Rahman	Platinum performer - progress to next round
Arulini Ashwiinaa Arumugam	Chinna Chinna Asai	Vairamuthu	Roja	Minmini	A. R. Rahman	Karthik - 9/10; Saindhavi - 9/10; Vijay Prakash - 9/10
Magizhan Paridhi	Aaruyire	Vairamuthu	Guru	A. R. Rahman, Chinmayi Sripaada, Vineeth Sreenivasan, Rahul Raj, Murtuza Khan, Qadir Khan	A. R. Rahman	Golden performer - progress to next round
Jaya Bargavi S	Yaro Yarodi	Vairamuthu	Alai Payuthey	Mahalakshmi Iyer, Vaishali Samant, Richa Sharma	A. R. Rahman	Golden performer - progress to next round
Sharangha Varatharajan	Yaro Yarodi	Vairamuthu	Alai Payuthey	Mahalakshmi Iyer, Vaishali Samant, Richa Sharma	A. R. Rahman	Golden performer - progress to next round
Karthikeyan	Nallai Allai	Vairamuthu	Kaatru Veliyidai	Chinmayi Sripaada, Sathyaprakash Dharmar	A. R. Rahman	Karthik - 8.5/10; Saindhavi - 8.5/10; Vijay Prakash - 8.5/10
Pokkishiya Sandra	Chandralekha	Vairamuthu	Thiruda Thiruda	Annupamaa, Suresh Peters	A. R. Rahman	Golden performer - progress to next round
Sarath Saarz	Usure Pogudhey	Vairamuthu	Raavanan	Karthik, Mohammed Irfan	A. R. Rahman	Golden performer - progress to next round
Medha Ramaswamy	Hello Mister Edhirkatchi	Vairamuthu	Iruvar	Harini, Rajagopal	A. R. Rahman	Golden performer - progress to next round
Veerapandiyan	Poongkaatrilae	Vairamuthu	Uyire	Unni Menon, Swarnalatha	A. R. Rahman	Platinum performer - progress to next round
Mukesh Kumar	Veerapandi Kotayyile	Vairamuthu	Thiruda Thiruda	Unni Menon, Mano, K. S. Chithra	A. R. Rahman	Golden performer - progress to next round
Shwetha Sristi	Veerapandi Kotayyile	Vairamuthu	Thiruda Thiruda	Unni Menon, Mano, K. S. Chithra	A. R. Rahman	Golden performer - progress to next round

=== Dedication Round (episodes 17 and 18) ===
Name of contestant(s)	Name of song	Lyricist	Name of Film/Album	Singer(s)	Composer(s)	Round Status (including scores)
Sharangha Varatharajan	Tholvi Nilayenna	Aabavanan	Oomai Vizhigal	P. B. Sreenivas, Aabavanan	Manoj–Gyan	Golden performer - progress to next round
Magizhan Paridhi	Unkoodave Porakkanum	GKB	Namma Veettu Pillai	Sid Sriram (version 1) Shashaa Tirupati (version 2)	D. Imman	Golden performer - progress to next round
Shwetha Sristi	Aanandha Yaazhai	Na. Muthukumar	Thanga Meenkal	Sriram Parthasarathy	Yuvan Shankar Raja	Golden performer - progress to next round
Medha Ramaswamy	Megame Megame	Vairamuthu	Palaivana Solai	Vani Jairam	Shankar–Ganesh	Golden performer - progress to next round
Gopika Kesavan	Unakku Thaan	Vivek	Chithha	Santhosh Narayanan, Dhvani Kailas	Santhosh Narayanan	Golden performer - progress to next round
Karthikeyan	Nenjae Yezhu	Kutti Revathi, A. R. Rahman	Maryan	A. R. Rahman	A. R. Rahman	Golden performer - progress to next round
Aman Sakha	Aazhi Soozhndha	Mohan Rajan	Sivappu Manjal Pachai	Sreekanth Hariharan	Siddhu Kumar	Golden performer - progress to next round
Sarath Saarz	Amma Endru Alaikatha Uyir Illaiye	Vaali	Mannan	K. J. Yesudas	Ilaiyaraaja	Golden performer - progress to next round

=== Dedication Round (episodes 19 and 20) ===
Name of contestant(s)	Name of song	Lyricist	Name of Film/Album	Singer(s)	Composer(s)	Round Status (including scores)
Mukesh Kumar	Malarnthum Malaradha	Kannadasan	Pasamalar	T. M. Soundararajan, P. Susheela	Viswanathan–Ramamoorthy	Golden performer - progress to next round
Saran Sandy	Aarariraro	Snehan	Raam	K. J. Yesudas	Yuvan Shankar Raja	Golden performer - progress to next round
Sowmya Murugeswaran	Vaa di Rasathi	Vivek	36 Vayadhinile	Lalitha Vijayakumar	Santhosh Narayanan	Golden performer - progress to next round
Vijay Ija	Dheivangal Ellam	Na. Muthukumar	Kedi Billa Killadi Ranga	Vijay Yesudas	Yuvan Shankar Raja	Golden performer - progress to next round
Arulini Ashwiinaa Arumugam	Ini Achcham Achcham Illai	Vairamuthu	Indira	Anuradha Sriram, Sujatha Mohan, Shweta Mohan, G. V. Prakash Kumar, Esther	A. R. Rahman	Golden performer - progress to next round
Indrajith	Nalam Vaazha	Vaali	Marupadiyum	S. P. Balasubrahmanyam	Ilaiyaraaja	Golden performer - progress to next round
Jaya Bargavi S	Kannamma	Yugabharathi	Rekka	Nandini Srikar	D. Imman	Golden performer - progress to next round
Balamurugan	Naanaga Naanille	Vaali	Thoongathey Thambi Thoongathey	S. P. Balasubrahmanyam (version 1) Ilaiyaraaja (version 2)	Ilaiyaraaja	Golden performer - progress to next round
Veerapandiyan	Unnai Pola Aatha	Ilaiyaraaja	Ennai Vittu Pogaathe	Ilaiyaraaja	Ilaiyaraaja	Golden performer - progress to next round

=== Village Folk Round (episodes 21 and 22) ===
Name of contestant(s)	Name of song	Lyricist	Name of Film/Album	Singer(s)	Composer(s)	Round Status (including scores)
Mukesh Kumar	Pachamala Poovu	R. V. Udayakumar	Kizhakku Vaasal	S. P. Balasubrahmanyam	Ilaiyaraaja	Karthik - 9.5/10; Saindhavi - 9.5/10; Vijay Prakash - 9.5/10
Shwetha Sristi	Uppu Karuvadu	Vairamuthu	Mudhalvan	Shankar Mahadevan, Kavita Krishnamurti	A. R. Rahman	Progress to next round
Magizhan Paridhi	Uppu Karuvadu	Vairamuthu	Mudhalvan	Shankar Mahadevan, Kavita Krishnamurti	A. R. Rahman	Progress to next round
Arulini Ashwiinaa Arumugam	Thamarai Poovukum	Vairamuthu	Pasumpon	Sujatha Mohan, Krishnachandran	Vidyasagar	Golden performer - progress to next round
Indrajith	Thamarai Poovukum	Vairamuthu	Pasumpon	Sujatha Mohan, Krishnachandran	Vidyasagar	Karthik - 9/10; Saindhavi - 9/10; Vijay Prakash - 9/10
Sarath Saarz	Sandhu Pottu	Vaali	Thevar Magan	S. P. Balasubrahmanyam, Kamal Haasan	Ilaiyaraaja	Golden performer - progress to next round
Veerapandiyan	Inji Idupazhaga	Vaali	Thevar Magan	S. Janaki (version 1) S. Janaki, Kamal Haasan, Minmini (version 2)	Ilaiyaraaja	Golden performer - progress to next round
Gopika Kesavan	Inji Idupazhaga	Vaali	Thevar Magan	S. Janaki (version 1) S. Janaki, Kamal Haasan, Minmini (version 2)	Ilaiyaraaja	Golden performer - progress to next round
Sharangha Varatharajan	Sendhoora Poove	Gangai Amaran	16 Vayathinile	S. Janaki	Ilaiyaraaja	Karthik - 8/10; Saindhavi - 8.5/10; Vijay Prakash - 8.5/10 (Eliminated)
Medha Ramaswamy	Raasave Unna Nambi	Vairamuthu	Muthal Mariyathai	S. Janaki	Ilaiyaraaja	Karthik - 9/10; Saindhavi - 9/10; Vijay Prakash - 9/10
Saran Sandy	Kathaazha Kaattu Vazhi	Vairamuthu	Kizhakku Cheemayile	S. Janaki, P. Jayachandran	A. R. Rahman	Karthik - 8.5/10; Saindhavi - 9/10; Vijay Prakash - 9/10 (Danger Zone)
Shamala Devi	Kathaazha Kaattu Vazhi	Vairamuthu	Kizhakku Cheemayile	S. Janaki, P. Jayachandran	A. R. Rahman	Karthik - 8.5/10; Saindhavi - 9/10; Vijay Prakash - 9/10 (Danger Zone)
Sowmya Murugeswaran	Nee Kattum Selai	Palani Bharathi	Pudhiya Mannargal	Sujatha Mohan, T. L. Maharajan	A. R. Rahman	Karthik - 9.5/10; Saindhavi - 9/10; Vijay Prakash - 10/10
Karthikeyan	Nee Kattum Selai	Palani Bharathi	Pudhiya Mannargal	Sujatha Mohan, T. L. Maharajan	A. R. Rahman	Karthik - 9/10; Saindhavi - 9.5/10; Vijay Prakash - 9.5/10
Balamurugan	Santhaikku Vantha Kili	Panchu Arunachalam	Dharma Durai	S. P. Balasubrahmanyam, S. Janaki	Ilaiyaraaja	Karthik - 9/10; Saindhavi - 9/10; Vijay Prakash - 9/10
Bavathayini	Santhaikku Vantha Kili	Panchu Arunachalam	Dharma Durai	S. P. Balasubrahmanyam, S. Janaki	Ilaiyaraaja	Karthik - 9/10; Saindhavi - 9/10; Vijay Prakash - 9/10
Jaya Bargavi S	Vetti Veru Vasam	Vairamuthu	Muthal Mariyathai	Malaysia Vasudevan, S. Janaki	Ilaiyaraaja	Platinum performer - progress to next round
Vijay Ija	Vetti Veru Vasam	Vairamuthu	Muthal Mariyathai	Malaysia Vasudevan, S. Janaki	Ilaiyaraaja	Platinum performer - progress to next round
Aman Sakha	Senthamizh Naatu Thamizhachiye	Vairamuthu	Vandicholai Chinraasu	Shahul Hameed	A. R. Rahman	Karthik - 10/10; Saindhavi - 9.5/10; Vijay Prakash - 9.5/10
Pokkishiya Sandra	Panju Mittai	Kasthuri Raja	Ettupatti Rasa	Malaysia Vasudevan, S. Janaki	Deva	Karthik - 9/10; Saindhavi - 9/10; Vijay Prakash - 9/10 (Danger Zone)
Vijaya Loshan	Panju Mittai	Kasthuri Raja	Ettupatti Rasa	Malaysia Vasudevan, S. Janaki	Deva	Karthik - 9/10; Saindhavi - 9/10; Vijay Prakash - 9/10

=== பக்தி பாடல்கள் சுற்று (episodes 23 and 24) ===
Name of contestant(s)	Name of song	Lyricist	Name of Film/Album	Singer(s)	Composer(s)	Round Status (including scores)
Saran Sandy	Samy Varuthu	Vaali	Udan Pirappu	S. P. Balasubrahmanyam, Mano	Ilaiyaraaja	Golden performer - progress to next round
Indrajith	Samy Varuthu	Vaali	Udan Pirappu	S. P. Balasubrahmanyam, Mano	Ilaiyaraaja	Golden performer - progress to next round
Gopika Kesavan	Amman Kovil	Muthulingam (poet)	Aranmanai Kili	Swarnalatha, Minmini	Ilaiyaraaja	Saindhavi - 9/10; Vijay Prakash - 9/10
Arulini Ashwiinaa Arumugam	Amman Kovil	Muthulingam (poet)	Aranmanai Kili	Swarnalatha, Minmini	Ilaiyaraaja	Saindhavi - 9/10; Vijay Prakash - 9/10
Mukesh Kumar	Kallaimattum Kandal	Vaali	Dasavathaaram	Hariharan	Himesh Reshammiya	Golden performer - progress to next round
Balamurugan	Ullam Uruguthaiyaa Murugaa	Andavan Pichai	Kuzhanthai Velan	T. M. Soundararajan	T. M. Soundararajan	Saindhavi - 9/10; Vijay Prakash - 9/10
Sowmya Murugeswaran	Ange Idi Mulanguthu		Sanmugavel Pambai Muzhankuthayya	Thekkampatty S.Sundarajan	Ramji S Balan	Golden performer - progress to next round
Veerapandiyan	Malaiyanooru Angaliyae	Sakthi Shanmugaraja		Sakthi Shanmugaraja	Sakthi Shanmugaraja	Saindhavi - 9/10; Vijay Prakash - 9/10
Vijaya Loshan	Swamiye Ayyappo Ayyappo Swamiye	Veeramani Somu	Pallikkattu	Veeramani Raju	Veeramani Krishna	Golden performer - progress to next round
Medha Ramaswamy	Solla Solla Inikkuthada Muruga	Kannadasan	Kandhan Karunai	P. Susheela	K. V. Mahadevan	Saindhavi - 9/10; Vijay Prakash - 9/10
Pokkishiya Sandra	Matha Un Kovilil	Vaali	Naan Kadavul	Srimathumitha	Ilaiyaraaja	Golden performer - progress to next round
Sarath Saarz	Paarthene (Amman Song)	Pa. Vijay	Mookuthi Amman	Jairam Balasubramaniam	Girishh Gopalakrishnan	Golden performer - progress to next round
Aman Sakha	Theeyaga Thondri	Nattu Raja Durai	Aranmanai 3	Shankar Mahadevan, Hariharan	C. Sathya	Platinum performer - progress to next round
Magizhan Paridhi	Theeyaga Thondri	Nattu Raja Durai	Aranmanai 3	Shankar Mahadevan, Hariharan	C. Sathya	Platinum performer - progress to next round
Shwetha Sristi	Thaka Thaka Thakavena Aadava	Kannadasan	Karaikkal Ammaiyar	K. B. Sundarambal	Kunnakudi Vaidyanathan	Golden performer - progress to next round
Karthikeyan	Merku Seemaiyile	Kasthuri Raja	Ettupatti Rasa	Swarnalatha, Deva	Deva	Golden performer - progress to next round
Vijay Ija	Merku Seemaiyile	Kasthuri Raja	Ettupatti Rasa	Swarnalatha, Deva	Deva	Golden performer - progress to next round
Jaya Bargavi S	Arupadai Veedu Konda	Kannadasan	Kandhan Karunai	Sirkazhi Govindarajan	K. V. Mahadevan	Platinum performer - progress to next round

=== Saregamapa Sangamam (episodes 25 and 26) ===
Name of contestant(s)	Name of song	Lyricist	Name of Film/Album	Singer(s)	Composer(s)	Round Status (including scores)
Magizhan Paridhi	Maya Nadhi	Umadevi	Kabali	Ananthu, Pradeep Kumar, Shweta Mohan	Santhosh Narayanan	Saindhavi - 9.5/10; Karthik - 9.5/10
Sanjana	Maya Nadhi	Umadevi	Kabali	Ananthu, Pradeep Kumar, Shweta Mohan	Santhosh Narayanan	Saindhavi - 9.5/10; Karthik - 9.5/10
Naga Arjun	Thottu Thottu Pesum	Vairamuthu	Ethirum Puthirum	Swarnalatha, Pushpavanam Kuppusamy	Vidyasagar	Saindhavi - 9.5/10; Karthik - 9.5/10
Sowmya Murugeswaran	Thottu Thottu Pesum	Vairamuthu	Ethirum Puthirum	Swarnalatha, Pushpavanam Kuppusamy	Vidyasagar	Saindhavi - 9.5/10; Karthik - 9.5/10
Vijay Ija	Elangaathu Veesudhey	Palani Bharathi	Pithamagan	Sriram Parthasarathy (version 1) Sriram Parthasarathy, Shreya Ghoshal (version 2)	Ilaiyaraaja	Golden performer - progress to next round
Lakshana Ashokkumar	Elangaathu Veesudhey	Palani Bharathi	Pithamagan	Sriram Parthasarathy (version 1) Sriram Parthasarathy, Shreya Ghoshal (version 2)	Ilaiyaraaja	Golden performer - progress to next round
Vijaya Loshan	Ale Ale	Kabilan	Boys	Karthik, Chitra Iyer	A. R. Rahman	Saindhavi - 9.5/10; Karthik - 9.5/10
Raagawarshini	Ale Ale	Kabilan	Boys	Karthik, Chitra Iyer	A. R. Rahman	Saindhavi - 9.5/10; Karthik - 9.5/10
Purushothaman	Manasula Soora Kaathey	Yugabharathi	Cuckoo	Sean Roldan, Divya Ramani	Santhosh Narayanan	Saindhavi - 8.5/10; Karthik - 8.5/10 (Danger Zone)
Gopika Kesavan	Manasula Soora Kaathey	Yugabharathi	Cuckoo	Sean Roldan, Divya Ramani	Santhosh Narayanan	Saindhavi - 8.5/10; Karthik - 8.5/10 (Danger Zone)
Kilmisha	Thoda Thodu Enavae Vanavil	Vairamuthu	Thullatha Manamum Thullum	Hariharan, K. S. Chithra	S. A. Rajkumar	Saindhavi - 8.5/10; Karthik - 8.5/10 (Danger Zone)
Karthikeyan	Thoda Thodu Enavae Vanavil	Vairamuthu	Thullatha Manamum Thullum	Hariharan, K. S. Chithra	S. A. Rajkumar	Saindhavi - 8.5/10; Karthik - 8.5/10 (Danger Zone)
Nishanth Kavin	Nilavai Konduva	Vairamuthu	Vaalee	P. Unnikrishnan, Anuradha Sriram	Deva	Golden performer - progress to next round
Arulini Ashwiinaa Arumugam	Nilavai Konduva	Vairamuthu	Vaalee	P. Unnikrishnan, Anuradha Sriram	Deva	Golden performer - progress to next round
Sarath Saarz	Uyire Uyire	Vairamuthu	Bombay	Hariharan, K. S. Chithra, Swarnalatha	A. R. Rahman	Saindhavi - 9/10; Karthik - 9.5/10
Akshaya Shivkumar	Uyire Uyire	Vairamuthu	Bombay	Hariharan, K. S. Chithra, Swarnalatha	A. R. Rahman	Saindhavi - 9/10; Karthik - 9.5/10
Saran Sandy	Kannamma	Uma Devi	Kaala	Pradeep Kumar, Dhee, Ananthu	Santhosh Narayanan	Golden performer - progress to next round
Shamala Devi	Kannamma	Uma Devi	Kaala	Pradeep Kumar, Dhee, Ananthu	Santhosh Narayanan	Golden performer - progress to next round
Jeevan Padmakumar	Poraney Poraney	Karthik Netha	Vaagai Sooda Vaa	Neha Bhasin, Ranjith (singer)	Ghibran Vaibodha	Golden performer - progress to next round
Pokkishiya Sandra	Poraney Poraney	Karthik Netha	Vaagai Sooda Vaa	Neha Bhasin, Ranjith (singer)	Ghibran Vaibodha	Golden performer - progress to next round
Mukesh Kumar	Pudhu Vellai Mazhai	Vairamuthu	Roja	Unni Menon, Sujatha Mohan	A. R. Rahman	Golden performer - progress to next round
Riskhitha Jawahar	Pudhu Vellai Mazhai	Vairamuthu	Roja	Unni Menon, Sujatha Mohan	A. R. Rahman	Golden performer - progress to next round

=== Saregamapa Sangamam (episode 27) ===
Name of contestant(s)	Name of song	Lyricist	Name of Film/Album	Singer(s)	Composer(s)	Round Status (including scores)
Medha Ramaswamy	Mannipaaya	Thamarai	Vinnaithaandi Varuvaayaa	Shreya Ghoshal, A. R. Rahman	A. R. Rahman	Saindhavi - 9/10; Karthik - 9.5/10 (Eliminated)
Kanishkar	Mannipaaya	Thamarai	Vinnaithaandi Varuvaayaa	Shreya Ghoshal, A. R. Rahman	A. R. Rahman	Saindhavi - 9/10; Karthik - 9.5/10 (Eliminated)
Bhavathayini	Azhagana Ratchashiyae	Vairamuthu	Mudhalvan	S. P. Balasubrahmanyam, Harini, G. V. Prakash Kumar	A. R. Rahman	Saindhavi - 8.5/10; Karthik - 8/10 (Eliminated)
Indrajith	Azhagana Ratchashiyae	Vairamuthu	Mudhalvan	S. P. Balasubrahmanyam, Harini, G. V. Prakash Kumar	A. R. Rahman	Saindhavi - 8.5/10; Karthik - 8/10 (Eliminated)
Balamurugan	Kadhorum Lolakku	Vaali	Sinna Mapplai	Mano, S. Janaki	Ilaiyaraaja	Saindhavi - 8.5/10; Karthik - 9/10
Shamala Devi	Kadhorum Lolakku	Vaali	Sinna Mapplai	Mano, S. Janaki	Ilaiyaraaja	Saindhavi - 8.5/10; Karthik - 9/10
Shwetha Sristi	Mudhalvanae	Vairamuthu	Mudhalvan	Shankar Mahadevan, S. Janaki	A. R. Rahman	Saindhavi - 9.5/10; Karthik - 9.5/10
Ruthresh Kumar	Mudhalvanae	Vairamuthu	Mudhalvan	Shankar Mahadevan, S. Janaki	A. R. Rahman	Saindhavi - 9.5/10; Karthik - 9.5/10
Jaya Bargavi S	Ayyo Pathikichu	Vairamuthu	Rhythm	Udit Narayan, Vasundhara Das	A. R. Rahman	Platinum performer - progress to next round
Sharath Matthew	Ayyo Pathikichu	Vairamuthu	Rhythm	Udit Narayan, Vasundhara Das	A. R. Rahman	Platinum performer - progress to next round
Veerapandiyan	Kadhal Oviyam	Panchu Arunachalam	Alaigal Oivathillai	Ilaiyaraaja, Jensy Gregory	Ilaiyaraaja	Golden performer - progress to next round
Akshaya Shivkumar	Kadhal Oviyam	Panchu Arunachalam	Alaigal Oivathillai	Ilaiyaraaja, Jensy Gregory	Ilaiyaraaja	Golden performer - progress to next round

=== Retro Round (episode 28) ===
Name of contestant(s)	Name of song	Lyricist	Name of Film/Album	Singer(s)	Composer(s)	Round Status (including scores)
Vijaya Loshan	Hey Unnai Thaane Nee Endha	Vairamuthu	Kadhal Parisu	S. P. Balasubrahmanyam, S. Janaki	Ilaiyaraaja	Saindhavi - 9/10; Vijay Prakash - 9/10 (Danger Zone)
Saran Sandy	Yeh Aatha	Gangai Amaran	Payanangal Mudivathillai	S. P. Balasubrahmanyam	Ilaiyaraaja	Saindhavi - 9/10; Vijay Prakash - 8.5/10
Gopika Kesavan	Entha Poovilum	Panchu Arunachalam	Murattu Kaalai	S. Janaki	Ilaiyaraaja	Golden performer - progress to next round
Arulini Ashwiinaa Arumugam	Machaana Paaradi	Vairamuthu	Thanga Magan	S. Janaki, Vani Jairam	Ilaiyaraaja	Saindhavi - 9.5/10; Vijay Prakash - 9.5/10
Mukesh Kumar	Engeyum Eppothum	Kannadasan	Ninaithale Inikkum	S. P. Balasubrahmanyam	M. S. Viswanathan	Golden performer - progress to next round

=== Retro Round (episodes 29 and 30) ===
Name of contestant(s)	Name of song	Lyricist	Name of Film/Album	Singer(s)	Composer(s)	Round Status (including scores)
Veerapandiyan	Sangathil Padatha	Pulamaipithan	Auto Raja	S. Janaki, Ilaiyaraaja	Ilaiyaraaja	Saindhavi - 9/10; Vijay Prakash - 9/10
Raagawarshini	Sangathil Padatha	Pulamaipithan	Auto Raja	S. Janaki, Ilaiyaraaja	Ilaiyaraaja	Saindhavi - 9/10; Vijay Prakash - 9/10
Shwetha Sristi	Vaa Vaa Pakkam Vaa	Muthulingam	Thanga Magan	S. P. Balasubrahmanyam, Vani Jairam	Ilaiyaraaja	Saindhavi - 9.5/10; Vijay Prakash - 9/10
Jaya Bargavi S	Ada Machamulla	Muthulingam	Chinna Veedu	S. P. Balasubrahmanyam, S. Janaki, S. P. Sailaja, T. V. Gopalakrishnan	Deva	Golden performer - progress to next round
Vijay Ija	Adiye Manam Nilluna	Gangai Amaran	Neengal Kettavai	S. P. Balasubrahmanyam	Ilaiyaraaja	Golden performer - progress to next round
Sarath Saarz	Sorgam Madhuvile	Kannadasan	Sattam En Kaiyil	S. P. Balasubrahmanyam	Ilaiyaraaja	Golden performer - progress to next round
Sowmya Murugeswaran	Poomaalai Oru Paavai Aanadhu	Vaali	Thanga Magan	S. P. Balasubrahmanyam, S. Janaki	Ilaiyaraaja	Golden performer - progress to next round
Pokkishiya Sandra	Idhu Oru Nila Kaalam	Vairamuthu	Tik Tik Tik	S. Janaki, T. V. Gopalakrishnan	Ilaiyaraaja	Saindhavi - 9/10; Vijay Prakash - 9/10
Balamurugan	Ithu Oru Pon Malai	Vairamuthu	Nizhalgal	S. P. Balasubrahmanyam	Ilaiyaraaja	Saindhavi - 8.5/10; Vijay Prakash - 8/10 (Non-competitor)
Karthikeyan	Ennadi Meenakshi	Vaali	Ilamai Oonjal Aadukirathu	S. P. Balasubrahmanyam	Ilaiyaraaja	Saindhavi - 8.5/10; Vijay Prakash - 9/10 (Eliminated)
Aman Sakha	Namma Ooru Singari	Kannadasan	Ninaithale Inikkum	S. P. Balasubrahmanyam	M. S. Viswanathan	Golden performer - progress to next round
Magizhan Paridhi	Sambo Sivasambo	Kannadasan	Ninaithale Inikkum	M. S. Viswanathan	M. S. Viswanathan	Platinum performer - progress to next round

=== One on One Round (episodes 31 and 32) ===
Name of contestant(s)	Name of song	Lyricist	Name of Film/Album	Singer(s)	Composer(s)	Round Status (including scores)
Pokkishiya Sandra	Mudhal Murai	Na. Muthukumar	Neethaane En Ponvasantham	Sunidhi Chauhan	Ilaiyaraaja	Progress to next round
Aman Sakha	Ennodu Nee Irundhaal	Kabilan	I	Sid Sriram, Sunitha Sarathy (version 1) Sid Sriram, Chinmayi Sripaada (version 2)	A. R. Rahman	Progress to next round
Shwetha Sristi	Ennulle Ennulle	Vaali	Valli	Swarnalatha	Ilaiyaraaja	Golden performer - progress to next round
Vijay Ija	Kodai Kaala Kaatre	Gangai Amaran	Panneer Pushpangal	Malaysia Vasudevan	Ilaiyaraaja	Progress to next round
Sowmya Murugeswaran	Unnai Kaanaadha	Kannadasan	Idhaya Kamalam	P. Susheela	K. V. Mahadevan	Golden performer - progress to next round
Gopika Kesavan	Paal Polave (Naalai Intha Velai Paarthu)	Vaali	Uyarndha Manithan	P. Susheela	M. S. Viswanathan	Progress to next round
Sarath Saarz	Mudhan Mudhalil	Vasan	Aahaa..!	Hariharan (version 1) Hariharan, K. S. Chithra (version 2)	Deva	Golden performer - progress to next round
Mukesh Kumar	Poi Solla Koodathu	Arivumathi	Run	Hariharan, Sadhana Sargam	Vidyasagar	Progress to next round
Magizhan Paridhi	Isaiyil Thodanguthamma	Ilaiyaraaja	Hey Ram	Ajoy Chakrabarty	Ilaiyaraaja	Progress to next round
Jaya Bargavi S	Maraindhirundhu	Kannadasan	Thillana Mohanambal	P. Susheela	K. V. Mahadevan	Golden performer - progress to next round
Vijaya Loshan	Azhagiya Laila	Palani Bharathi	Ullathai Allitha	Mano	Sirpy	Golden performer - progress to next round
Arulini Ashwiinaa Arumugam	Senthoora	Thamarai	Bogan	Luksimi Sivaneswaralingam	D. Imman	Golden performer - progress to next round
Veerapandiyan	Ninaithu Ninaithu Parthen	Na. Muthukumar	7G Rainbow Colony	KK	Yuvan Shankar Raja	Golden performer - progress to next round
Saran Sandy	Roja Roja	Vaali	Kadhalar Dhinam	P. Unnikrishnan (version 1) Hariharan (version 2)	A. R. Rahman	Progress to next round

=== College Round (episodes 33 and 34) ===
Name of contestant(s)	Name of song	Lyricist	Name of Film/Album	Singer(s)	Composer(s)	Round Status (including scores)
Arulini Ashwiinaa Arumugam	Megam Karukuthu	Vairamuthu	Kushi	Harini	Deva	Progress to next round
Magizhan Paridhi	All Day Jolly Day	Pa. Vijay	Manadhai Thirudivittai	Shankar Mahadevan, Yuvan Shankar Raja	Yuvan Shankar Raja	Golden performer - progress to next round
Sowmya Murugeswaran	Yaaro (Love Theme)	Vaali	Chennai 600028	S. P. Balasubrahmanyam, K. S. Chithra	Yuvan Shankar Raja	Progress to next round (Danger Zone)
Gopika Kesavan	Gaana Karunkuyile	Ponnadiyan	Sethu	Kovai Kamala	Ilaiyaraaja	Golden performer - progress to next round
Veerapandiyan	Pottu Vaitha Oru Vatta Nila	Vaali	Idhayam	K. J. Yesudas (version 1) Ilaiyaraaja (version 2)	Ilaiyaraaja	Progress to next round
Mukesh Kumar	Urvasi Urvasi	Vairamuthu	Kadhalan	Suresh Peters, Shahul Hameed, A. R. Rahman	A. R. Rahman	Golden performer - progress to next round
Saran Sandy	Kadhal Valarthen	Na. Muthukumar	Manmadhan	KK	Yuvan Shankar Raja	Progress to next round
Vijaya Loshan	Girlfriend	Pa. Vijay	Boys	Karthik, Tippu, Timmy	A. R. Rahman	Eliminated
Sarath Saarz	Mustafa Mustafa	Vaali	Kadhal Desam	A. R. Rahman	A. R. Rahman	Golden performer - progress to next round
Jaya Bargavi S	Munbe Vaa	Vaali	Sillunu Oru Kaadhal	Shreya Ghoshal, Naresh Iyer	A. R. Rahman	Progress to next round
Vijay Ija	Ava Enna	Thamarai	Vaaranam Aayiram	Karthik, V. V. Prasanna	Harris Jayaraj	Golden performer - progress to next round
Shwetha Sristi	September Madham	Vairamuthu	Alai Payuthey	Asha Bhosle, Shankar Mahadevan	A. R. Rahman	Golden performer - progress to next round
Aman Sakha	Jumbalakka	Vairamuthu	En Swasa Kaatre	Rafee	A.R. Rahman	Golden performer - progress to next round
Pokkishiya Sandra	Shakalaka Baby	Vairamuthu	Mudhalvan	Vasundhara Das, Pravin Mani	A. R. Rahman	Eliminated

=== Celebrating Captain Vijayakanth (episodes 35 and 36) ===
Name of contestant(s)	Name of song	Lyricist	Name of Film/Album	Singer(s)	Composer(s)	Round Status (including scores)
Arulini Ashwiinaa Arumugam	Paasamulla Paandiyare	Gangai Amaran	Captain Prabhakaran	Mano, K. S. Chithra	Ilaiyaraaja	Progress to next round (Danger Zone)
Magizhan Paridhi	Un Paarvayil	Gangai Amaran	Amman Kovil Kizhakale	K. J. Yesudas (version 1) K. J. Yesudas, K. S. Chithra (version 2)	Ilaiyaraaja	Golden performer - progress to next round
Mukesh Kumar	Chinnamani Kuyile	Gangai Amaran	Amman Kovil Kizhakale	S. P. Balasubrahmanyam	Ilaiyaraaja	Golden performer - progress to next round
Aman Sakha	Adi Kaana Karunkuyile	Gangai Amaran	Poonthotta Kaavalkaaran	K. J. Yesudas	Ilaiyaraaja	Golden performer - progress to next round
Jaya Bargavi S	Muthumani Maala	R. V. Udayakumar	Chinna Gounder	S. P. Balasubrahmanyam, P. Susheela	Ilaiyaraaja	Progress to next round (Danger Zone)
Sowmya Murugeswaran	Mayanginen Solla Thayanginen	Vaali	Naane Raja Naane Mandhiri	P. Jayachandran, P. Susheela	Ilaiyaraaja	Golden performer - progress to next round
Sarath Saarz	Namma Kadai Veedhi	Gangai Amaran	Amman Kovil Kizhakale	S. P. Balasubrahmanyam	Ilaiyaraaja	Golden performer - progress to next round
Shwetha Sristi	Maalayil Yaro Manathodu	Vaali	Chatriyan	Swarnalatha	Ilaiyaraaja	Golden performer - progress to next round
Balamurugan (non-competitive)	Nee Pottu Vacha	Gangai Amaran, Ilaiyaraaja	Ponmana Selvan	Malaysia Vasudevan, Mano, K. S. Chithra	Ilaiyaraaja	Not Applicable
Gopika Kesavan	Karuppu Nila	Vaali	En Aasai Machan	K. S. Chithra	Deva	Progress to next round (Danger Zone)
Veerapandiyan	Antha Vaanathai	R. V. Udayakumar	Chinna Gounder	Ilaiyaraaja	Ilaiyaraaja	Golden performer - progress to next round
Vijay Ija	Rasathi Unnai	Vaali	Vaidehi Kathirunthal	P. Jayachandran	Ilaiyaraaja	Platinum performer - progress to next round
Saran Sandy	Kaathirunthu	Vaali	Vaidehi Kathirunthal	P. Jayachandran	Ilaiyaraaja	Golden performer - progress to next round

=== Wedding Songs (திருமண பாடல்கள்) Round (episodes 37 and 38) ===
Name of contestant(s)	Name of song	Lyricist	Name of Film/Album	Singer(s)	Composer(s)	Round Status (including scores)
Aman Sakha	Nenaichchapadi	Vaali	Kadhalar Dhinam	M. G. Sreekumar, Srinivas, Ganga Sitharasu, Kanchana	A. R. Rahman	Vijay Prakash - 9/10; Abhirami - 9/10
Mukesh Kumar	Anbil Avan	Thamarai	Vinnaithaandi Varuvaayaa	Devan Ekambaram, Chinmayi Sripaada	A. R. Rahman	Golden performer - progress to next round
Vijay Ija	Ottagathai Kattiko	Vairamuthu	Gentleman	S. P. Balasubrahmanyam, S. Janaki, Sujatha Mohan, Minmini	A. R. Rahman	Vijay Prakash - 9/10; Abhirami - 9.5/10
Jaya Bargavi S	Oru Naalum	R. V. Udayakumar	Yajaman	S. P. Balasubrahmanyam, S. Janaki	Ilaiyaraaja	Golden performer - progress to next round
Sarath Saarz	Kummi Adi	Vaali	Sillunu Oru Kaadhal	Sirkazhi G. Sivachidambaram, Naresh Iyer, Chorus, Theni Kunjarammal, Swarnalatha	A. R. Rahman	Golden performer - progress to next round
Gopika Kesavan	Idhuthaanaa	Thamarai	Saamy	K. S. Chithra	Harris Jayaraj	Golden performer - progress to next round
Arulini Ashwiinaa Arumugam	Nenjinile Nenjinile	Vairamuthu	Dil Se/Uyire	S. Janaki, M. G. Sreekumar	A. R. Rahman	Vijay Prakash - 9/10; Abhirami - 9.5/10
Magizhan Paridhi	Manamaalaiyum Manjalum	Pulamaipithan	Vaathiyaar Veettu Pillai	S. P. Balasubrahmanyam	Ilaiyaraaja	Golden performer - progress to next round
Sowmya Murugeswaran	Kana Kaangiren	Vairamuthu	Ananda Thandavam	Nithyasree Mahadevan, Shubha Mudgal, Vinita	G. V. Prakash Kumar	Vijay Prakash - 9/10; Abhirami - 9.5/10
Shwetha Sristi	Kannalanae	Vairamuthu	Bombay	K. S. Chithra, A. R. Rahman	A. R. Rahman	Vijay Prakash - 8.5/10; Abhirami - 9/10
Veerapandiyan	Nooru Varusham	Vaali	Panakkaran	Mano (version 1) S. Janaki (version 2)	Ilaiyaraaja	Golden performer - progress to next round
Saran Sandy	Poove Sem Poove	Vaali	Solla Thudikuthu Manasu	K. J. Yesudas (version 1) Sunanda (version 2)	Ilaiyaraaja	Golden performer - progress to next round

=== Road to Finale Unplugged Round (episodes 39 and 40) ===
Name of contestant(s)	Name of song	Lyricist	Name of Film/Album	Singer(s)	Composer(s)	Round Status (including scores)
Mukesh Kumar	Andru Vandhadhum	Kannadasan	Periya Idathu Penn	T. M. Soundararajan, P. Susheela	Viswanathan–Ramamoorthy	Progress to next round
Sowmya Murugeswaran	Palinginal Oru Maligai	Kannadasan	Vallavan Oruvan	L. R. Eswari	Vedha	Progress to next round
Aman Sakha	Kanne Kalaimaane	Kannadasan	Moondram Pirai	K. J. Yesudas	Ilaiyaraaja	Progress to next round
Veerapandiyan	En Kadhale	Vairamuthu	Duet	S. P. Balasubrahmanyam (version 1) K. S. Chithra (version 2)	A. R. Rahman	Progress to next round
Magizhan Paridhi	Ennavale Adi Ennavale	Vairamuthu	Kadhalan	P. Unnikrishnan	A. R. Rahman	Golden performer - progress to next round
Arulini Ashwiinaa Arumugam	Parkaadhey	Vaali	Gentleman	Minmini, Srinivas, Noel James	A. R. Rahman	Progress to next round
Gopika Kesavan	Unnai Ondru Ketpen (adagio)	Kannadasan	Puthiya Paravai	P. Susheela	Viswanathan–Ramamoorthy	Progress to next round
Vijay Ija	Raja Raja Chozhan	Mu. Metha	Rettai Vaal Kuruvi	K. J. Yesudas	Ilaiyaraaja	Progress to next round
Saran Sandy	Minnalae	Vairamuthu	May Maadham	S. P. Balasubrahmanyam	A. R. Rahman	Progress to next round
Jaya Bargavi S	Snegithane Snegithane	Vairamuthu	Alai Payuthey	Sadhana Sargam, Srinivas	A. R. Rahman	Golden performer - progress to next round
Sarath Saarz	O Vennila	Vaali	Kadhal Desam	P. Unnikrishnan	A. R. Rahman	Progress to next round
Shwetha Sristi	Kannan Vandhu Paaduginraan	Vaali	Rettai Vaal Kuruvi	S. Janaki	Ilaiyaraaja	Golden performer - progress to next round

=== Hero Heroine Round (episodes 41 and 42) ===
Name of contestant(s)	Name of song	Lyricist	Name of Film/Album	Singer(s)	Composer(s)	Round Status (including scores)
Saran Sandy	Oru Pen Pura	Vairamuthu	Annaamalai	K. J. Yesudas	Deva	Progress to next round
Mukesh Kumar	Ennai Thalatta Varuvala	Palani Bharathi	Kadhalukku Mariyadhai	Hariharan, Bhavatharini	Ilaiyaraaja	Progress to next round
Arulini Ashwiinaa Arumugam	Sattru Munbu	Na. Muthukumar	Neethaane En Ponvasantham	Ramya NSK	Ilaiyaraaja	Golden performer - progress to next round
Veerapandiyan	Kodiyile Malliyapoo	Vairamuthu	Kadalora Kavithaigal	P. Jayachandran, S. Janaki	Ilaiyaraaja	Progress to next round
Jaya Bargavi S	Yeh Duraa Dummunu	Pa. Vijay	Aathi	Tippu, Saindhavi	Vidyasagar	Progress to next round
Sarath Saarz	Kaadu Thirande Kidakinrathu	Vairamuthu	Vasool Raja MBBS	Hariharan, Sadhana Sargam	Bharadwaj	Golden performer - progress to next round
Gopika Kesavan	Anbae Idhu (Sky)	Vairamuthu	Rhythm	Sadhana Sargam	A. R. Rahman	Progress to next round
Sowmya Murugeswaran	Azhagu Malaraada	Vaali	Vaidehi Kathirunthal	S. Janaki, T. S. Raghavendra	Ilaiyaraaja	Progress to next round
Aman Sakha	Pachchai Nirame (Sakiye)	Vairamuthu	Alai Payuthey	Hariharan, Clinton Cerejo	A. R. Rahman	Golden performer - progress to next round
Magizhan Paridhi	Thoongatha Vizhigal	Vaali	Agni Natchathiram	K. J. Yesudas, S. Janaki	Ilaiyaraaja	Golden performer - progress to next round
Shwetha Sristi	Manam Virumbuthey	Vairamuthu	Nerrukku Ner	P. Unnikrishnan (version 1) Harini (version 2)	Deva	Progress to next round
Vijay Ija	Thakita Thadimi Thakita Thadimi Thamdhaanaa	Vairamuthu	Sagara Sangamam	S. P. Balasubrahmanyam	Ilaiyaraaja	Golden performer - progress to next round

=== Celebrating SPB Round (episodes 43 and 44) ===
Name of contestant(s)	Name of song	Lyricist	Name of Film/Album	Singer(s)	Composer(s)	Round Status (including scores)
Sowmya Murugeswaran	Raathiriyil Poothirukum	Pulamaipithan	Thanga Magan	S. P. Balasubrahmanyam, S. Janaki	Ilaiyaraaja	Progress to next round
Shwetha Sristi	Rojavai Thaalattum	Vairamuthu	Ninaivellam Nithya	S. P. Balasubrahmanyam, S. Janaki	Ilaiyaraaja	Golden performer - progress to next round
Sarath Saarz	Keladi Kanmani	Vaali	Pudhu Pudhu Arthangal	S. P. Balasubrahmanyam	Ilaiyaraaja	Progress to next round
Gopika Kesavan	Paadu Nilavae	Mu. Metha	Udaya Geetham	S. P. Balasubrahmanyam, S. Janaki	Ilaiyaraaja	Golden performer - progress to next round
Veerapandiyan	Nilaave Vaa	Vaali	Mouna Ragam	S. P. Balasubrahmanyam	Ilaiyaraaja	Progress to next round
Jaya Bargavi S	Kulicha Kuthalam	Vairamuthu	Duet	S. P. Balasubrahmanyam, T. K. Kala	A. R. Rahman	Golden performer - progress to next round
Arulini Ashwiinaa Arumugam	Nenjukkule Innarendru	Vaali	Ponnumani	S. P. Balasubrahmanyam (version 1) S. P. Balasubrahmanyam, S. Janaki (version 2)	Ilaiyaraaja	Progress to next round
Aman Sakha	Panivizhum Malar Vanam	Vairamuthu	Ninaivellam Nithya	S. P. Balasubrahmanyam	Ilaiyaraaja	Progress to next round
Saran Sandy	Malaiyoram Veesum Kaatru	Vaali	Paadu Nilave	S. P. Balasubrahmanyam (version 1) K. S. Chithra (version 2)	Ilaiyaraaja	Golden performer - progress to next round
Vijay Ija	Mandram Vandha	Vaali	Mouna Ragam	S. P. Balasubrahmanyam	Ilaiyaraaja	Progress to next round
Mukesh Kumar	Oruvan Oruvan	Vairamuthu	Muthu	S. P. Balasubrahmanyam	A. R. Rahman	Golden performer - progress to next round

=== Celebrating AR Rahman Round (episodes 45 and 46) ===
Name of contestant(s)	Name of song	Lyricist	Name of Film/Album	Singer(s)	Composer(s)	Round Status (including scores)
Mukesh Kumar	Thom Karuvil Irundom	Vairamuthu	Star	Shankar Mahadevan, Surjo Bhattacharya	A. R. Rahman	Progress to next round
Gopika Kesavan	Sowkiyama Kannae	Vairamuthu	Sangamam	Nithyasree Mahadevan	A. R. Rahman	Progress to next round
Sarath Saarz	Varaha Nadhikarai	Vairamuthu	Sangamam	Shankar Mahadevan	A. R. Rahman	Golden performer - progress to next round
Sowmya Murugeswaran	Poraale Ponnuthayi	Vairamuthu	Karuthamma	Swarnalatha (version 1) Sujatha Mohan, Unni Menon (version 2)	A. R. Rahman	Progress to next round
Vijay Ija	Mazhai Thulli	Vairamuthu	Sangamam	Hariharan, M. S. Viswanathan	A. R. Rahman	Golden performer - progress to next round
Arulini Ashwiinaa Arumugam	Machhakkari	Vaali	Sillunu Oru Kaadhal	Shankar Mahadevan, Vasundhara Das	A. R. Rahman	Progress to next round
Saran Sandy	Nadhiye Nadhiye(Water)	Vairamuthu	Rhythm	Unni Menon	A. R. Rahman	Progress to next round
Jaya Bargavi S	Aye Mr. Minor!	Pa. Vijay	Kaaviya Thalaivan	Haricharan, Shashaa Tirupati	A. R. Rahman	Golden performer - progress to next round
Aman Sakha	Ae Maapuru Mangaiyae	Vairamuthu	Guru	Srinivas, Sujatha Mohan, Mohammed Aslam, A. R. Rahman	A. R. Rahman	Golden performer - progress to next round
Veerapandiyan	Muzhumathi / Jashn-e-Bahara	Na. Muthukumar	Jodhaa Akbar	Srinivas	A. R. Rahman	Progress to next round

=== கிராமத்து மன்வாசனை Round (episodes 47 and 48) ===
Name of contestant(s)	Name of song	Lyricist	Name of Film/Album	Singer(s)	Composer(s)	Round Status (including scores)
Arulini Ashwiinaa Arumugam	Machaana Pathingala		Annakili	S. Janaki	Ilaiyaraaja	Golden performer - progress to next round
Vijay Ija	Antha Nilava Thaan	Vairamuthu	Muthal Mariyathai	Ilaiyaraaja, K. S. Chithra	Ilaiyaraaja	Progress to next round
Sowmya Murugeswaran	Rasave Unna Naan Ennithan	Vaali	Thanikattu Raja	S. P. Sailaja	Ilaiyaraaja	Progress to next round
Veerapandiyan	Indha Maan	Gangai Amaran	Karakattakkaran	Ilaiyaraaja, K. S. Chithra	Ilaiyaraaja	Golden performer - progress to next round
Gopika Kesavan	Kuyil Paattu	Ponnadiyan	En Rasavin Manasile	Swarnalatha (version 1) Ilaiyaraaja, Swarnalatha (version 2)	Ilaiyaraaja	Golden performer - progress to next round
Mukesh Kumar	Vanthenda Paalkaran	Vairamuthu	Annaamalai	S. P. Balasubrahmanyam	Deva	Progress to next round
Jaya Bargavi S	Thaana Vantha	Gangai Amaran	Ooru Vittu Ooru Vanthu	S. P. Balasubrahmanyam, S. Janaki	Ilaiyaraaja	Golden performer - progress to next round
Aman Sakha	Maanguyilae	Gangai Amaran	Karakattakkaran	S. P. Balasubrahmanyam (version 1) S. P. Balasubrahmanyam, S. Janaki (version 2)	Ilaiyaraaja	Golden performer - progress to next round
Saran Sandy	Putham Puthu Paattu	Vairamuthu	Thendral	S. P. Balasubrahmanyam, Pushpavanam Kuppusamy	Vidyasagar	Golden performer - progress to next round

=== Freestyle Round (episodes 49 and 50) ===
Name of contestant(s)	Name of song	Lyricist	Name of Film/Album	Singer(s)	Composer(s)	Round Status (including scores)
Mukesh Kumar	Sakthi Kodu	Vairamuthu	Baba	Karthik	A. R. Rahman	Eliminated
Jaya Bargavi S	Mayya (song)	Vairamuthu	Guru	Chinmayi Sripada, Maryem Tollar, Keerthi Sagathia	A. R. Rahman	Eliminated
Gopika Kesavan	Yengae Enathu Kavithai	Vairamuthu	Kandukondain Kandukondain	K. S. Chithra, Srinivas	A. R. Rahman	Eliminated
Sowmya Murugeswaran	Raasa Kannu	Yugabharathi	Maamannan	Vadivelu	A. R. Rahman	Eliminated
Arulini Ashwiinaa Arumugam	Margazhi Thingal Allava	Vairamuthu	Sangamam	S. Janaki, P. Unnikrishnan, Srimathumitha	A. R. Rahman	Eliminated
Vijay Ija	Unakkena Iruppaen	Na. Muthukumar	Kaadhal	Haricharan	Joshua Sridhar	Eliminated
Veerapandiyan	Paadi Parantha	R. V. Udayakumar	Kizhakku Vaasal	S. P. Balasubrahmanyam	Ilaiyaraaja	Golden performer - progress to next round

=== Grand Finale (episode 51) ===
Name of contestant(s)	Name of song	Lyricist	Name of Film/Album	Singer(s)	Composer(s)
Magizhan	Oru Naal Podhuma	Kannadasan	Thiruvilaiyadal	M. Balamuralikrishna	K. V. Mahadevan
Sarath Saarz	Sundari Kannal	Vaali	Thalapathi	S. P. Balasubrahmanyam, S. Janaki	Ilaiyaraaja
Magizhan Paridhi	Malargaley	Vairamuthu	Love Birds	Hariharan, K. S. Chithra	A. R. Rahman
Shwetha Sristi	Hai Rama	Vairamuthu	Rangeela	Hariharan, Swarnalatha	A. R. Rahman
Veerapandiyan	Naan Autokaaran	Vairamuthu	Baashha	S. P. Balasubrahmanyam	Deva
Shwetha	Kavithai Kelungal Karuvil	Vairamuthu	Punnagai Mannan	Vani Jairam, P. Jayachandran	Ilaiyaraaja
Aman Sakha	Paattum Naane	Kannadasan	Thiruvilaiyadal	T. M. Soundararajan	K. V. Mahadevan
Veerapandi	En Mana Vaanil	Mu. Metha	Kasi	Hariharan	Ilaiyaraaja
Aman	Udhaya Udhaya	Arivumathi	Udhaya	Hariharan, Sadhana Sargam	A. R. Rahman
