= Payanangal Mudivathillai (soundtrack) =

Soundtrack album by Ilaiyaraaja
- Released: 1982
- Genre: Feature film soundtrack
- Length: 30:58
- Language: Tamil
- Label: Echo
- Producer: Ilaiyaraaja

Ilaiyaraaja chronology
Moondram Pirai (1982)	Payanangal Mudivathillai (1982)	Thanikattu Raja (1982)

The soundtrack for the 1982 Tamil-language film Payanangal Mudivathillai featured seven songs composed by Ilaiyaraaja, written by Vairamuthu, Gangai Amaran and Muthulingam and performed by S. P. Balasubrahmanyam and S. Janaki. The film, directed by R. Sundarrajan and produced by Kovaithambi of Motherland Pictures—marking their maiden film for Sundarrajan and Kovaithambi as director and producer—stars Mohan and Poornima Jayaram. It was released on Ilaiyaraaja's label Echo Records in LP records and cassettes.

== Production ==
Kovaithambi insisted on Ilaiyaraaja's inclusion as music being an integral part of the story; After Sundarrajan narrated the film's story for two hours, Ilaiyaraaja agreed to be a part of the film and composed 30 tunes within 12 hours and told Sundarrajan told to choose the tunes he felt would fit the scenes. Sundarrajan said he would explain the scenes and let Ilaiyaraaja choose the appropriate tunes. Vairamuthu penned three songs for the film, while Gangai Amaran and Muthulingam penned two songs each. S. P. Balasubrahmanyam and S. Janaki were the primary singers in the album.

== Composition ==
"Yeh Aatha" was initially intended for Murattu Kaalai (1980), when the film's director S. P. Muthuraman wanted an alternative tune for "Podhuvaga En Manasu Thangam", and Ilaiyaraaja presented this particular tune for that song, though Muthuraman preferred the earlier tune. It was then, subsequently used in the film. According to Amaran, it "sounds like a folk music but it has the classical touch". The song belongs to the dappankuthu genre, and follows a 6/8 time signature.

"Ilaya Nila" was originally intended for Moodu Pani (1980), but as the director Balu Mahendra was dissatisfied with the tune, Ilaiyaraaja wrote the tune of "Yen Iniya Pon Nilaave". "Ilaya Nila" was also eventually used in this film. The instrumentation of "Ilaya Nila" includes an acoustic guitar and a flute, performed respectively by guitarist R. Chandrasekhar and flautist Sudhakar. During its recording, Ilaiyaraaja required over 20 retakes to get Chandrasekhar play its flamenco notes to his satisfaction. The song was composed in C-sharp minor; according to Chandrasekhar, as Ilaiyaraaja "wanted to highlight the guitar's beauty", and has a bossa nova influence. The song "Vaigaraiyil" is set to the Carnatic raga known as Shubhapantuvarali, "Mani Osai" is set to Sindhu Bhairavi, and "Thogai Ilamayil" is set to Latangi.

== Track listing ==
No.	Title	Lyrics	Singer(s)	Length
1.	"Yeh Aatha"	Gangai Amaran	S. P. Balasubrahmanyam	4:34
2.	"Ilaya Nila Pozhigirathe"	Vairamuthu	S. P. Balasubrahmanyam	4:40
3.	"Mani Osai"	Muthulingam	S. P. Balasubrahmanyam, S. Janaki	4:38
4.	"Mudhal Mudhal"	Muthulingam	S. P. Balasubrahmanyam	4:25
5.	"Salaiyoram"	Vairamuthu	S. P. Balasubrahmanyam, S. Janaki	4:32
6.	"Thogai Ilamayil"	Vairamuthu	S. P. Balasubrahmanyam	3:39
7.	"Vaigaraiyil"	Gangai Amaran	S. P. Balasubrahmanyam	4:30
Total length:				30:58

== Reception and legacy ==
According to K. P. Sunil of The Illustrated Weekly of India, Payanangal Mudivathillai was the first Indian film to have "larger-than-life cut-outs" of its composer. In its review, Ananda Vikatan described Ilaiyaraaja's music and Balasubrahmanyam's singing as the two main pillars of the film.

In 2011, The Hindu described "Ilaya Nila" as an "evergreen hit". Following Balasubrahmanyam's death in September 2020, Lakshmi Subramanian of The Week published an article regarding the best songs from Ilaiyaraaja and Balasubrahmanyam's collaboration and included "Ilaya Nila" in the list. The FM radio station Radio City hosted a special show Raja Rajathan which would broadcast Ilaiyaraaja's songs for 91 days—beginning from 3 March to 2 June 2015; "Ilaya Nila" was one of the most-requested songs on the show.

== Other versions ==
"Ilaya Nila" was later adapted by Kalyanji–Anandji as "Neele Neele Ambar Par" for the film's Hindi remake Kalaakaar (1983), and "Yeh Aatha" was remixed by Mani Sharma for Malaikottai (2007).
