= Annaamalai (soundtrack) =

1992 soundtrack album to Annaamalai by Deva

- Cassette cover

Soundtrack album by Deva
- Released: 8 May 1992
- Genre: Feature film soundtrack
- Length: 28:43
- Language: Tamil
- Label: Lahari Music
- Producer: Deva

Deva chronology
Vaigasi Poranthachu (1991)	Annaamalai (1992)	Surieyan (1992)

Annaamalai is the soundtrack album, composed by Deva with lyrics by Vairamuthu, for the 1992 Tamil film of the same name, starring Rajinikanth and directed by Suresh Krissna. It marks the beginning of a collaboration between Rajinikanth and Deva, replacing Ilaiyaraaja, who was the norm composer for Rajinikanth's films. The soundtrack was released on 8 May 1992, under Lahari Music label.

== Development ==
Annaamalai marked Deva's first collaboration with Rajinikanth. K. Balachander, the film's producer, chose Deva as the composer, due to a misunderstanding with his usual composer Ilaiyaraaja. Rajinikanth and Krissna were initially worried with the choice of Deva. When Krissna met Deva, he had already composed the title song "Annaamalai Annaamalai" when Vasanth was the director. The song, which is a duet number, sung by S. P. Balasubrahmanyam and K. S. Chithra, is set in the Carnatic raga known as Mohanam.

"Vanthenda Paalkaaran" was inspired by "Neenaarigadayo Ele Manava", a Kannada poem by G. V. Iyer which Rajinikanth had suggested; the poem talked about cows as deities, useful to humans in many ways. Vairamuthu grasped the core of the poem and embellished it further, adding an element of contrast between the ever-giving cow and selfish humans who only take from other beings. He also inserted a few ingenious words to boost Rajinikanth's image as a "mass hero" of the Tamils, such as "Ennai Vaazha Vaithadhu Tamizh Paalu" (It is the milk of love from you Tamils that has given me life). The song's tune is based on the Marathi folk song "Mi Dolkara Daryacha Raja" released in 1969.

"Kondayil Thazham Poo" was written as a "peppy piece" to differentiate from the "soft and more melodic" title song. Krissna was irked by the lines "Koodaiyil Enna Poo? Khushbu" (What is the name of the flower in your basket? Khushbu) and "Veerathil Mannan Nee, Vetriyil Kannan Nee, Endrumae Raja Nee, Rajini" (You are always a brave and victorious king, oh, Rajini) because of the obvious references to the actors who were not playing themselves, but the rest of the crew liked them, so they were retained. Vairamuthu revealed that Rajinikanth wanted his name included in the lyrics after hearing Khushbu's name being uttered.

After Deva composed the tune for "Oru Pennpura" and recited it to the crew, beginning with a "sober strain" and following it with a "mellifluous faster pace", Vairamuthu hesitated to write the lyrics, despite liking the tune. He said, "It's lovely, but the latter part of the Pallavi takes off rapidly. I can't spoil the beauty of the tune by filling it up with flippant phrases, and I'll end up doing exactly that if the tune has such short notes". After Krissna and Deva were unsuccessful in convincing Vairamuthu to write the song, Rajinikanth succeeded, and Krissna was impressed with the lyrics Vairamuthu wrote. According to Krissna, the story of Annaamalai is not about how the title character becomes wealthy, but what happens afterwards. To depict how he becomes wealthy, the nearly five-minute song "Vetri Nichayam", which is a montage showing Annaamalai's rise to power over the course of several years, was conceived.

The film did not originally call for a duet number picturised on Annaamalai and Subbu in their old age. Balachander felt the film was becoming too grim and that a duet number would bring levity to the situation. Though Rajinikanth objected when Krissna suggested this, Balachander convinced Krissna that audiences would not see it as an intrusion; this resulted in the song "Rekkai Katti Parakudhu" being conceived. Balachander wanted to compose the song within a day so that shooting of the film being completed. With an orchestra of 40 musicians with 25 violins, Deva composed that song in 20 minutes and finished the recording that afternoon. The theme song, which does not appear on the soundtrack and plays during the Super Star graphic title card, was inspired by the James Bond Theme.

== Track listing ==
No.	Title	Singer(s)	Length
1.	"Vanthenda Paalkaran"	S. P. Balasubrahmanyam	5:06
2.	"Annaamalai Annaamalai"	S. P. Balasubrahmanyam, K. S. Chithra	4:58
3.	"Kondayil Thaazham Poo"	S. P. Balasubrahmanyam, K. S. Chithra	4:41
4.	"Vetri Nichayam"	S. P. Balasubrahmanyam	4:14
5.	"Oru Pen Pura"	K. J. Yesudas	5:13
6.	"Rekkai Katti Parakudhu"	S. P. Balasubrahmanyam, K. S. Chithra	4:23

== Reception ==
Lalitha Dileep of The Indian Express wrote "Lyricist Vairamuthu and music director Deva share the honours in elevating the musical score of the film, with S. P. Balasubramaniam and Chitra adding their mite". K. Vijiyan of New Straits Times criticised three of the songs for slowing the film's pace, but appreciated the background score.

== Legacy ==
Deva adapted the song "Oru Penpura" as "Sangathiye" for Kannada film Kadamba (2004) also directed by Suresh Krishna. This version was rendered by S. P. Balasubrahmanyam.

== Bibliography ==
- Krissna, Suresh; Rangarajan, Malathi (2012). My Days with Baasha: The Rajnikanth Phenomenon. Westland. ISBN 978-93-8162-629-0.
