= Mi Dolkara Daryacha Raja =

Marathi-language song by Lata Mangeshkar and Hemant Kumar

Song by Lata Mangeshkar, Hemant Kumar

from the album Geet Shilp Marathi Geete
- Language: Marathi
- Genre: Koli geet
- Length: 7:21
- Label: Saregama India Ltd; A RSGP Group Company
- Songwriter: Shanta Shelke
- Composer: Hridaynath Mangeshkar

"Mi Dolkara Daryacha Raja" is a 1969 Marathi-language song sung by Lata Mangeshkar and Hemant Kumar, with lyrics by Shanta Shelke. Composed by Hridaynath Mangeshkar.

== Development ==
In West Bengal, the ‘Kahars’—who carry palanquins on their shoulders—sing in a distinct rhythm for their own enjoyment. Hridaynath Mangeshkar, having heard these songs, decided to create a Koli song with a similar rhythm. He approached Shanta Shelke to write lyrics about the life of the Kolis.

Shanta Shelke composed a song that blends Marathi and Konkani, carefully crafted after observing the lives and mindset of the fishermen, both men and women, as well as the geography and social dynamics of the Konkan region. The composition reflects her in-depth study over several days. The song's music incorporates a rhythmic pattern, with the chorus prominently featuring the lines ‘Valhav Re Nakhava’.

This song, first broadcast on the radio in 1969, became an instant hit and received widespread acclaim.

== Reception ==
Kailas Kamod of Sakal praises the song for its exquisite musical composition, which beautifully captures both the serene and tumultuous moods of the sea. Additionally, he commends Lata Mangeshkar's skillful use of Konkani pronunciation, which adds a distinct rhythm to the piece. Kamod writes, "When listening to the lines ‘Valhav Re Nakhava,’ the rhythm created evokes the sensation of being in a boat, gently swaying on calm waves." Loksatta praising the emotional depth and musical structure of the song, highlight how the melody shifts from intense, expansive highs to introspective, calming lows.

== Influence ==
The tune of the song was adapted for the Tamil song "Vanthenda Paalkaaran" from the film Annaamalai (1992). Composed by Deva and sung by S. P. Balasubrahmanyam, the song used the folk melody to elevate Rajinikanth's mass hero image.

The melody was also reused in 1990 Hindi song "I Love You" for the soundtrack of Mahasangram film.
