= Annakili (soundtrack) =

Soundtrack album by Ilaiyaraaja
- Released: 1976
- Genre: Feature film soundtrack
- Length: 20:45
- Language: Tamil
- Label: His Master's Voice
- Producer: Ilaiyaraaja

Ilaiyaraaja chronology
Annakili (1976)	Paalooti Valartha Kili (1976)

Annakili is the debut soundtrack album composed by Ilaiyaraaja to the 1976 film of the same name. The film is directed by Devaraj–Mohan and written by Panchu Arunachalam from a story by R. Selvaraj, and stars Sivakumar and Sujatha with S. V. Subbaiah, Srikanth, Thengai Srinivasan and Fatafat Jayalaxmi in supporting roles. The soundtrack featured five songs written by the screenwriter Arunachalam and released under the His Master's Voice label.

Prior to his debut, Ilaiyaraaja worked as a technician and instrumentalist for several composers and assisted G. K. Venkatesh, before Arunachalam's interest on a debutant composer. Ilaiyaraaja was eventually suggested by Selvaraj, who had presented all of the tunes before scripting the film which led Arunachalam to develop the screenplay based on the songs he had composed. The soundtrack was considered to be a blend of Indian and Western classical music with the Tamil folk.

Upon release, the soundtrack was appreciated for its composition and the musical styles and genres, which were much different from earlier Tamil film music and eventually became popular after its release, besides attributing to the film's success. It further established Ilaiyaraaja as a leading composer in the Tamil film industry who would later work on several films

== Background and development ==
Before his debut as a composer in Annakili, Ilaiyaraaja worked as a session guitarist, keyboardist, and organist for film music composers and directors such as Salil Chowdhury from West Bengal. After being referred by Master Dhanraj, he assisted Kannada film composer G. K. Venkatesh during the early-1970s, who helped him to orchestrate melodic outlines developed by Venkatesh and learned composing under his guidance. He eventually wrote and composed background music for Muslim devotional songs rendered by Nagore E. M. Haniffa.

At that point, when Arunachalam wanted a debutant composer who could provide new kind of music, it was Selvaraj who suggested Raaja's name. Arunachalam added "Ilaiya" (transl. younger) as prefix in his name Raaja and he named as "Ilaiyaraaja" to differentiate from the already established composer A. M. Rajah. During a meeting with Ilaiyaraaja, Arunachalam asked if he had composed any songs for the film, he casually sang a bunch of songs, one of them was "Annakili Unnai Theduthe" and "Machanai Paartheengala" using harmonium. Arunachalam eventually wrote the film's screenplay based on the film's songs.

== Production ==
Ilaiyaraaja applied the techniques of modern popular film music orchestration to Tamil folk poetry and folk song melodies, which created a fusion of Western and Tamil idioms. According to historian S. Theodore Baskaran, the compositions were "a blend of Indian classical music, Western classical music and folk music of the Tamils".

The song "Machanai Paartheengala" was originally composed and sung at a marriage by Ilaiyaraaja and his orchestra even before the film's release. In an event Ilayaraja told that he was inspired from the classical guitar piece Romance d'Amour to compose the music for "Machanai Paartheengala" and converted that tune into a folk song. The song "Sonthamillai Banthamillai" is based on Nadanamakriya raga. Arunachalam revealed he wrote lyrics for the song "Sondhamillai" even before its tune was composed while lyrics for songs "Machanai", "Annakili Unnai" and "Suttha Samba" were written after its tunes were composed. The song "Sonthamillai Banthamillai" was deleted during the first release of the film; however after fans demanded the song it was later again added into the film.

When the song "Annakili Unnai" was being recorded, during the first take the studio faced a power cut though it was recorded in second take but the song was not recorded clearly as the recorder's assistant forgot to plug in the switch but it was improvised in the third take. Initially, Ilaiyaraaja wanted S. P. Balasubrahmanyam to sing the title track, but as Balasubrahmanyam was unwell during that time, he then approached T. M. Soundararajan to perform the sad version of the song.

== Track listing ==
No.	Title	Singer(s)	Length
1.	"Adi Raakayi"	S. Janaki	4:11
2.	"Annakili" (happy)	S. Janaki	4:49
3.	"Annakili" (sad)	T. M. Soundararajan	3:17
4.	"Machaana Pathingala"	S. Janaki	4:26
5.	"Sontham Illai"	P. Susheela	4:02
Total length:			20:45

== Reception ==
According to Baskaran, the songs were "authentically folksy and it changed the way the film music was composed". Randor Guy, writing for The Hindu called Ilaiyaraaja's music as a "major highlight" and described "Machaana Pathingala" as an "evergreen melody". Nandhu Sundaram of The News Minute attributed Ilaiyaraaja's music being much different from M. S. Viswanathan's works with "the harmonics, the beats and the lyricism are all radically different" and "just like the folksy tunes, it is the background score that makes Annakili a really great watch."

== Impact ==
The soundtrack was critically acclaimed and its success and popularity, established Ilaiyaraaja as a leading composer in Tamil cinema. The soundscapes, composition, orchestration and instrumentation were praised by critics attributed it being much different from earlier Tamil films, and also attributed that Ilaiyaraaja had revolutionized Tamil film music by providing wide range of genres and musical styles. During the film's 100th day of theatrical run, audience applauded to Ilaiyaraaja's name in the title card, and danced to the song "Machaana Pathingala". Trade analysts described that the songs were instrumental in the film's success, besides the story and screenplay. Since then, Annakili has been regarded as one of Ilaiyaraaja's best works in his career, with News18 called "Machaana Pathingala" as one of the "best songs to date".

In an interview to Srinivasa Ramanujam of The Hindu during 2018, Ilaiyaraaja recalled that he used to go for walks on the Santhome Beach, and used to hear the radio announcement of the airplay of the film's songs in his neighbour's house, where "the person inside used to shout, 'Annakili varudhu' (They're playing Annakili songs) to his neighbour. By the time I walked to the end of the street, radios in every house would be playing the same song. It was a wonderful experience." Critic Sujatha Narayanan attributed the success of "Machaana Pathingala" which led to the emergence of dappankuthu numbers in films during the 1980s; she felt the song was "rustic" in the beat and lyrics, yet "melodious" in the tune.

== Popular culture ==
The violin portions of the title song were used by K for the "Bar Anthem" in Mugamoodi (2012). The song "Machaana Pathingala" was parodied in Japanil Kalyanaraman (1985), in a comedy subplot featuring Goundamani and Kovai Sarala, as they were lost during a visit to Japan. It was featured in Padikkadavan (2009), in a sequence where Rocky's (Dhanush) parents go to their native town to get him engaged to his niece Thirukkani (Aarthi); the song "Adi Rakkayi" was played in another sequence during Rocky and Assault Arumugam's (Vivek) visit to Thoravi, a fictional town in Andhra Pradesh.

== Bibliography ==
- Baskaran, S. Theodore (1996). The Eye of the Serpent: An Introduction to Tamil Cinema. Chennai: East West Books. OCLC 243920437.
- Dhananjayan, G. (2014). Pride of Tamil Cinema: 1931–2013. Blue Ocean Publishers. OCLC 898765509.
- Greene, P. D. (2001). "Authoring the Folk: the crafting of a rural popular music in south India". Journal of Intercultural Studies. 22 (2) (2nd ed.): 161–172. doi:10.1080/07256860120069585. S2CID 143604516.
