= Punnagai Mannan (soundtrack) =

Soundtrack album by Ilaiyaraaja
- Released: 1986
- Genre: Feature film soundtrack
- Length: 36:45
- Language: Tamil
- Label: Echo
- Producer: Ilaiyaraaja

Punnagai Mannan is the soundtrack to the 1986 film of the same name directed by K. Balachander, starring Kamal Haasan and Revathi. The film's soundtrack consists of nine tracks composed by Ilaiyaraaja and written by Vairamuthu. It was notably one of the earliest Tamil films to use music systems and sequencers for recording the music.

== Development ==
Punnagai Mannan marked Ilaiyaraaja's second collaboration with Balachander after Sindhu Bhairavi (1985). It was one of the earliest films to introduce digital music in Tamil cinema. During a visit to Singapore in 1985, for a course on the Yamaha CX5M system, Ilaiyaraaja eventually purchased the computer for recording the music. This allowed him to type out notations of the specific instruments on keyboard, which records the tunes and mixes them with the vocals, instead of playing the instruments manually and mastered those tunes on computer. Ilaiyaraaja further used the Yamaha DX7 and Roland Jupiter-8 synthesizers, as well as E-mu drumulator and Roland R-8 drum machines, according to musician-critic Andy Votel. A. R. Rahman (who was then known as Dileep) played the synthesizers, besides programming the CX5M system and sequencer. Ilaiyaraaja composed five songs within an hour

Kumuthan Maderya, writing for Film Companion, said Punnagai Mannan "capitalises on the wave of popularity of modern dance musicals", as the film was made after the success of Flashdance, Staying Alive (both 1983) and Footloose (1984). The song "One Two Three" featured English lyrics written by Viji Manuel, and the theme music was played by Rahman on piano and synthesizer. In the nine-song soundtrack, four of them were set in Carnatic ragas. "Yedhedho Ennam Valarthen" is set in Pahadi; "Singalathu Chinnakuyile" is set in Bageshri; "Enna Satham" is in Sindhu Bhairavi; and "Kavithai Kelungal" is in Savithri.

== Track listing ==
No.	Title	Lyrics	Singer(s)	Length
1.	"Yedhedho Ennam Valarthen"	Vairamuthu	K. S. Chithra	4:23
2.	"Enna Saththam Indha Neram"	Vairamuthu	S. P. Balasubrahmanyam	4:17
3.	"Vaan Megam Poo Poovaai"	Vairamuthu	K. S. Chithra	3:53
4.	"Kavithai Kelungal Karuvil"	Vairamuthu	Vani Jairam, P. Jayachandran	7:00
5.	"Kaala Kaalamaaga Vaazhum"	Vairamuthu	S. P. Balasubrahmanyam, K. S. Chithra	4:21
6.	"Singalathu Chinnakuyile"	Vairamuthu	S. P. Balasubrahmanyam, K. S. Chithra	4:16
7.	"Maamaavukku Kudumaa Kudumaa"	Vairamuthu	Malaysia Vasudevan	4:34
8.	"Theme Music"	—	—	2:34
9.	"One Two Three"	Viji Manuel	Francis Lazarus	1:27
Total length:				36:45

== Reception ==
Punnagai Mannan's soundtrack—particularly "Enna Saththam Indha Neram" and the theme music—was popular post-release. During a felicitation ceremony for Balachander, Vairamuthu praised him for the song, stating he had the audacity to insert a song into a sequence in which two lovers were going to die. In May 2015, the FM radio station Radio City commemorated Ilaiyaraaja's 72nd birthday by broadcasting the composer's songs in a special show titled Raja Rajathan for 91 days. "Enna Satham" was one of the most-requested songs on the show. Nandini Ramnath, writing for Scroll.in, described it as a "love song, lullaby and dirge rolled into one".

== Sources ==
- Kamini, Mathai (2009). A. R. Rahman: The Musical Storm. India: Penguin Books. ISBN 978-0-670-08371-8.
- Sundararaman (2007) [2005]. Raga Chintamani: A Guide to Carnatic Ragas Through Tamil Film Music (2nd ed.). Pichhamal Chintamani. OCLC 295034757.
