= Anegan (soundtrack) =

2014 soundtrack album by Harris Jayaraj

Soundtrack album by Harris Jayaraj
- Released: 2 November 2014
- Recorded: 2014
- Genre: Feature film soundtrack
- Length: 30:19
- Language: Tamil
- Label: Sony Music India
- Producer: Harris Jayaraj

Harris Jayaraj chronology
Yaan (2014)	Anegan (2014)	Nannbenda (2015)

Anegan is the soundtrack album for the 2015 film of the same name, starring Dhanush and directed by K. V. Anand. The album featured six songs composed by Harris Jayaraj, with lyrics written by Vairamuthu, Kabilan Vairamuthu, Rokesh and C. S. Amudhan. The album was released by Sony Music on 2 November 2014.

== Development ==
For the film's soundtrack and score, Anand roped in his regular collaborator Harris Jayaraj to compose the music thereby marking his first collaboration with Dhanush. After his commitments on multiple films, by early-2014, he had begun composing the songs for the film in Paris. By May 2014, Jayaraj had begun recording a folk number titled "Aathadi Aathadi" which was written by Vairamuthu. Anand suggested Bhavatharini to record vocals for the song as it suited her voice, and the team requested her to do so to which Bhavatharini agreed.

In June 2014, Jayaraj recorded another song titled "Roja Kadale" also written by Vairamuthu; the song was recorded by Shankar Mahadevan, whom Harris had collaborated after Ghajini (2005). Later that month, he had recorded a "peppy number"—later deciphered to be "YOLO (You Only Live Once)"—and was written by director C. S. Amudhan. This was his second song in his stint as a lyricist, as he previously wrote for "Maddy Maddy" from Minnale (2001), also composed by Jayaraj. Regarding Amudhan's involvement, Anand said that as the song situation is based on how software employees wanting to have a chilled weekend, he searched for a lyricist who can capture the mood of the song, and ultimately zeroed on Amudhan whom he considered a "relaxed person at the core".

The dappankuthu number "Danga Maari Oodhari" was written by Rokesh and performed by Marana Gana Viji, in his maiden respectively stints as a songwriter and singer, while also featuring additional vocals from Dhanush and Naveen Madhav. Anand wanted Jayaraj to be devoid of western instruments and preferred him using local instruments like thaarai thappattai (lit. 'traditional folk percussions') for an earthy touch. After the tune was composed, Anand wanted a lyricist who is proficient in the local slang on Tamil and conjured up around 150 words, out of which Rokesh's lines intrigued the director. Rokesh, who worked as a machine operator in Vyasarpadi, used to write gaana songs as a hobby. He was briefed to write the song with words appropriate to a slum in the 1970s and had completed writing the lyrics within a day. But as the words were much alien to them, he would explain the lyrics one by one and would rewrite several times before the lyrics were finalised. Naveen Madhav, who recorded the vocals of the song claimed that the note was really high and had to strain his voice to make it pitch perfect, which in turn making his much different and unrecognizable.

In August 2014, Jayaraj informed via Twitter that almost all the songs were completed. By October, Jayaraj had completed the final mix of the songs. The music rights were acquired by Sony Music.

== Release ==
The track list was launched on 30 October 2014, featuring six tracks. The film's soundtrack had soft launch on 2 November 2014 at the Suryan FM radio station followed by a physical release at the AGS Cinemas multiplex chain in T. Nagar. Before the release, the album was made available through iTunes on 1 November. The event was later broadcast at the Cut 2 Cut show premiered via Sun Music on 16 November 2014. The soundtrack for the Telugu version Anekudu was released on 23 January 2015, at a promotional event held at Hyderabad.

== Track listing ==
=== Tamil ===
Anegan
No.	Title	Lyrics	Singer(s)	Length
1.	"Danga Maari Oodhari"	Rokesh	Dhanush, Marana Gana Viji, Naveen Madhav	5:42
2.	"Roja Kadale"	Vairamuthu	Shankar Mahadevan, Sunidhi Chauhan, Chinmayi	5:21
3.	"Aathadi Aathadi"	Vairamuthu	Bhavatharini, Tippu, Dhanush, Abhay Jodhpurkar	5:52
4.	"YOLO – (You Only Live Once)"	C. S. Amudhan	Shail Hada, Ramya NSK, Richard, MC Vickey, Eden	4:39
5.	"Thodu Vaanam"	Vairamuthu	Hariharan, Shakthisree Gopalan	5:15
6.	"Deivangal Ingae"	Kabilan Vairamuthu	Sriram Parthasarathy	3:30
Total length:				30:19

=== Telugu ===
Anekudu
No.	Title	Lyrics	Singer(s)	Length
1.	"Bandlaguda Rowdyki"	Sahithi	Vandemataram Srinivas, Marana Gana Viji, Naveen Madhav	5:42
2.	"Roja Kadali"	Vanamali	Vijay Prakash, Chinmayi	5:18
3.	"Ee Sinni Sinnari"	Vanamali	Tippu, Harini	5:50
4.	"YOLO – (You Only Live Once)"	Vanamali	Shail Hada, Ramya NSK, Richard, MC Vickey, Eden	4:38
5.	"Yegise Nadhi"	Vanamali	Srinivas, Shakthisree Gopalan, Durga	5:12
6.	"Deivamu Vundhi"	Vanamali	Sriram Parthasarathy	3:27
Total length:				30:07

== Reception ==
The Times of India-based critic gave 3 out of 5 to the album and stated "Harris and Anand made a fantabulous comeback with a string of songs encompassing different variety of genres of music." Siddharth K of Sify also provided the same rating and wrote "Anegan is another regular Harris Jeyaraj fare where the tunes keep giving a déjà vu to the listeners [...] While songs like "Roja Kadale", "Thodu Vaanam" and "Danga Maari" impress, the remaining songs fall flat making it an album not on the same lines of Ko and Maatraan."

Karthik Srinivasan of Milliblog considered it a "mild improvement" in comparison to the composer's previous three outings. Vipin Nair of Music Aloud gave 7.5 out of 10 to the soundtrack and stated "The reuse/inspiration aspect notwithstanding, Anegan is the best soundtrack that Harris Jayaraj has produced for KV Anand from among their four outings together." Anupama Subramanian of Deccan Chronicle wrote "Harris Jayaraj’s Danga Maari number is already a rage. All the other songs are okay."

== Accolades ==
Awards	Date of ceremony (Note: Date is linked to the article about the awards held that year, wherever possible.)	Category	Recipient(s) and nominee(s)	Result	Ref.
Edison Awards	14 February 2016	Favourite Song	"Danga Maari Oodhari"	Won	
IIFA Utsavam	24–25 January 2016	Best Lyricist – Tamil	Rokesh – ("Danga Maari Oodhari")	Nominated	
IIFA Utsavam	24–25 January 2016	Best Lyricist – Tamil	Vairamuthu – ("Roja Kadale")	Nominated	
IIFA Utsavam	24–25 January 2016	Best Male Playback Singer – Tamil	Dhanush, Marana Gana Viji and Naveen Madhav – ("Danga Maari Oodhari")	Nominated	
IIFA Utsavam	24–25 January 2016	Best Female Playback Singer – Tamil	Bhavatharini – ("Aathadi Aathadi")	Nominated	
Mirchi Music Awards South	27 July 2016	Lyricist of the Year – Tamil	Vairamuthu – ("Aathadi Aathadi")	Nominated	
Mirchi Music Awards South	27 July 2016	Female Vocalist of the Year – Tamil	Bhavatharini – ("Aathadi Aathadi")	Nominated	
Mirchi Music Awards South	27 July 2016	Mannin Kural – Male	Marana Gana Viji – ("Danga Maari Oodhari")	Won	
Mirchi Music Awards South	27 July 2016	Upcoming Male Vocalist of the Year – Tamil	Marana Gana Viji – ("Danga Maari Oodhari")	Nominated	
Mirchi Music Awards South	27 July 2016	Upcoming Female Vocalist of the Year – Tamil	Rokesh – ("Danga Maari Oodhari")	Nominated	

== Impact ==
The song "Danga Maari" emerged as a chartbuster after release. Director S. Shankar on his Twitter account, praised the song and its lyrics calling it an "instant hit". "Danga Maari" became a breakthrough for the singer Marana Gana Viji and lyricist Rokesh as well. Viji stated in an interview to The Times of India that "[Jayaraj] believed that someone as simple as me can sing that song and make it a hit. And the high point is that the song took me to even London and Toronto." Rokesh then wrote lyrics for popular songs such as "Dandanakka" from Romeo Juliet, "Maari Thara Local" from Maari, "Aaluma Doluma" from Vedalam, and other songs.
