= Vaagai Sooda Vaa (soundtrack) =

2011 soundtrack album by Ghibran

Soundtrack album by Ghibran
- Released: 1 July 2011
- Recorded: 2011
- Genre: Feature film soundtrack
- Length: 19:57
- Language: Tamil
- Label: Think Music
- Producer: Ghibran

Ghibran chronology
Vaagai Sooda Vaa (2011)	Vathikuchi (2013)

Vaagai Sooda Vaa is the soundtrack to the 2011 film of the same name directed by A. Sarkunam. The film's music and original score is composed by debutant Ghibran, featuring six songs written by Vairamuthu, Karthik Netha and Ve. Ramaswamy. The soundtrack album was released on 1 July 2011 and received positive critical reviews and numerous accolades.

== Background ==
Ghibran had previously composed music for jingles which had Sarkunam's involvement when he assisted A. L. Vijay and also wrote scripts for his advertisement directorials. Upon Sarkunam's insistence, he roped him to score music for the film. He recorded the film's music at his own studio in Chennai. The score was performed by the Lisbon Symphony Orchestra, who also performed one of the songs "Aana Aavanna" written by Vairamuthu.

== Release ==
The soundtrack was released on 1 July 2011 at Sathyam Cinemas in Chennai. The event saw the attendance of the cast and crew along with directors Bharathiraja, Ameer Sultan, Cheran, Chimbu Deven and Prabhu Solomon and actress-producer Radhika Sarathkumar amongst others. The event was hosted by Sivakarthikeyan.

== Reception ==
=== Critical response ===
Karthik of Milliblog commented "Vaagai Sooda Vaa’s soundtrack is a brilliant achievement – the music is refined and layered, something that is rarely expected out of a debut!" Rajagopalan Badrinarayanan from Musicperk.com complimented "wholesome package with wonderful songs" and gave 7.5 out of 10 to the album. N. Venkateswaran of The Times of India praised Ghibran's contribution to the film, saying that "M Ghibran joins the list of debut composers who have impressed with their work in recent times. The music score complements the movie and marks him out as a musician to watch out for."

Malathi Rangarajan from The Hindu complimented the film's music as one of the highlights saying "M. Gibran's numbers keep ringing in your ears long after you leave the cinema. VSV has a host of lyricists and each is effective." Pavithra Srinivasan of Rediff.com wrote "M Ghibran, a welcome addition to Tamil cinema, provides some neat tunes as well, adding some much-needed flavour to the proceedings."

=== Post-release ===
Initially the songs were not aired in radio as the film was backed by a relatively small production company and Ghibran was "relatively unknown". However, as A. R. Rahman appreciated his work, through text message helped him gain popularity. After its airplay in radio stations, Kamal Haasan who listened the song "Sara Sara Saara Kaathu", asked his assistant to buy the album, and played those tracks to Andrea Jeremiah, Pooja Kumar and the crew members during the production of Vishwaroopam (2013).

As the crew liked them, Haasan roped into compose music for the sequel, along with three other projects: Uttama Villain, Papanasam and Thoongaa Vanam (all 2015). The success of the music album, also led Ghibran's debut in Telugu cinema, with Run Raja Run (2014) as the director Sujeeth had listened to its songs and appreciated him for his compositions. Vaagai Sooda Vaa has been regarded as one of the best works of the composer, while "Sara Sara Saara Kaathu" being one of the notable songs of Chinmayi in Tamil.

=== Awards and nominations ===
Award	Date of ceremony (Note: Date is linked to the article about the awards held that year, wherever possible.)	Category	Recipient(s) and nominee(s)	Result	Ref.
The Chennai Times Film Awards	22 June 2012	Best Female Playback Singer	Chinmayi for "Sara Sara Saara Kaathu"	Won	
Filmfare Awards South	7 July 2012	Best Music Director – Tamil	Ghibran	Nominated	
Filmfare Awards South	7 July 2012	Best Female Playback Singer – Tamil	Chinmayi for "Sara Sara Saara Kaathu"	Won	
Filmfare Awards South	7 July 2012	Best Lyricist – Tamil	Vairamuthu for "Sara Sara Saara Kaathu"	Won	
International Tamil Film Awards	3 March 2012	Best Male Playback	Ranjith for "Poraaney Poraney"	Won	
Mirchi Music Awards South	4 August 2012	Best Upcoming Music Director	Ghibran	Won	
Mirchi Music Awards South	4 August 2012	Mannin Kural – Male	Jayamoorthy for "Thanjavuru Maadathi"	Won	
Mirchi Music Awards South	4 August 2012	Mannin Kural – Female	Anitha for "Senga Solla Kaara"	Won	
Mirchi Music Awards South	4 August 2012	Listener's Choice Award − Song	Ghibran for "Sara Sara Saara Kaathu"	Won (4th place)	
Mirchi Music Awards South	4 August 2012	Listener's Choice Award − Album	Vaagai Sooda Vaa	Won (5th place)	
Norway Tamil Film Festival Awards	20–25 April 2011	Best Female Playback Singer in Tamil	Chinmayi for "Sara Sara Saara Kaathu"	Won	
South Indian International Movie Awards	21–22 June 2012	Best Music Director – Tamil	Ghibran	Nominated	
South Indian International Movie Awards	21–22 June 2012	Best Female Playback Singer – Tamil	Chinmayi for "Sara Sara Saara Kaathu"	Won	
Vijay Awards	16 June 2012	Best Music Director	Ghibran	Nominated	
Vijay Awards	16 June 2012	Best Background Score	Ghibran	Nominated	
Vijay Awards	16 June 2012	Best Female Playback Singer	Chinmayi for "Sara Sara Saara Kaathu"	Won	
Vijay Awards	16 June 2012	Best Lyricist	Vairamuthu for "Sara Sara Saara Kaathu"	Won	
Vijay Awards	16 June 2012	Best Find of the Year	Ghibran	Won	

== Track listing ==
No.	Title	Lyrics	Singer(s)	Length
1.	"Senga Soola Kaara"	Vairamuthu	Anitha Karthikeyan	3:38
2.	"Sara Sara Saara Kathu"	Vairamuthu	Chinmayi	4:58
3.	"Thanjavuru Maadathi"	Ve. Ramasamy	Jayamoorthy	1:21
4.	"Poraney Poraney"	Karthik Netha	Neha Bhasin, Ranjith	5:14
5.	"Thaila Thaila"	Ve. Ramasamy	Rita	1:03
6.	"Aaana Aavanna"	Vairamuthu	Lisbon International Symphony Orchestra, Children's Choir	3:40
Total length:				19:57
