= Alaipayuthey (soundtrack) =

Soundtrack album by A. R. Rahman
- Released: 12 January 2000
- Recorded: Panchathan Record Inn, Chennai
- Genre: Feature film soundtrack
- Length: 47:45
- Language: Tamil
- Labels: Saregama; Star Music; Cee (I) TV Audio
- Producer: A. R. Rahman

A. R. Rahman chronology
Pukar (2000)	Alaipayuthey (2000)	Kandukondain Kandukondain (2000)

Alaipayuthey is the soundtrack album, composed by A. R. Rahman, to the 2000 Indian Tamil film of the same name. The soundtrack album consists of nine tracks from the original Tamil version of the album, whereas the Telugu version has seven tracks. The soundtrack of Alaipayuthey was unanimously hailed as a Mani Ratnam film soundtrack turning for rhythmic fusion using modern synthesizers. A film, initially planned with film score, eventually took place.

The soundtrack was well-received by audiences and received a number of awards the subsequent year. The original soundtrack sold over six lakh cassettes, and A. R. Rahman won the Filmfare Award for Best Music Director in 2000. The film score achieved cult status after the release of the film.

== Development ==
Initially, director Mani Ratnam wanted A. R. Rahman to compose only the film score. However, by the end of filming, nine songs were recorded. The lyrics of the track "Pachchai Nirame" are based on colours. The track is influenced by the instrumental works of Kitaro. The song is based on the raga "Kharaharapriya" and brings out the relaxing effect by using the facets of the musical scales. Cinematographer P. C. Sreeram used different color lenses as per the lyrical lines while filming this track. The song uses reverberating effect throughout its length. However, Rahman used light percussion, gently strummed acoustic guitars and layered the acoustic and synthesized versions of the same instrument. Additionally, the track has sounds of flute, violins and percussions. For Pachchai Nirame, Rahman ensured to use the timbres effectively so that the picturisation of the song matches to the tune. The track was filmed at Taj Mahal, village, lake, forests of Kashmir. The track "Snegithane Snegithane" is an ode by a wife to the husband. The track is based on the Shringaar rasa. "Snegithane Snegithane" has a video edit version, with additional opening vocals by Ustaad Rashid Khan. The video edit version was released only as a bonus track on the soundtrack and cassettes of Alaipayuthey (Original version) and not on Sakhi (Telugu dubbed version). However, the video edit version was used in all the three film versions. "Kaadhal Sadugudu" consists guitar riffs, based on the IndiPop and coming of age genre. The song was regarded as 'Beach Song' by Ratnam. The track "September Maadham" is a funky track, loosely based on fast-paced R. D. Burman music. "Yaaro Yarodi" is a rustic number that blends of folk instrument sounds appearing intermittently. The track was used in the 2008 film The Accidental Husband. "Maangalyam" song consists of nuptial mantras interspersed with lyrics of "Endrendrum Punngai". The title track "Alaipayuthey" was originally composed by the Carnatic music composer Oothukkadu Venkata Subbaiyar, who also set it to the raagam 'Kaanada'. Rahman added additional beats to the track. The track "Evano Oruvan" which has an Egyptian base to its composition.

Singer Bombay Jayashri recorded for the film score. Rahman made her sing the raag Sindhu Bhairavi for half an hour whose portions were used in a scene when the lead actress was hospitalized in the film.

== Critical response ==
Critic based at The Hindu asserted, "A. R. Rahman's numbers are already a hit – be it "Pachchai Niramae'' zestfully rendered by Hariharan or the melodious "Snegithanae'' or "Yaaro Yaarodi''. Now they come with added flavour in the form of excellently captured visuals and scenic presentations." However, the song "September Madham'' was criticized to obstruct the smooth flow of scenes with music. Methil Renuka of India Today praised the music of the film, calling it 'great'.St. Louis International Film Festival, critic Rich Cline called the music exuberant and colourful. Based on the 5.1 surround DVD release, James Grey stated, "The soundtrack is obviously heavily dubbed, which is not the disk's fault, and while the music doesn't have particular weight it comes across nicely enough. the music surprisingly (to me, anyway) accessible (with one tune going round my head even now)."

== Track list ==
=== Original Tamil version ===
All lyrics by Vairamuthu, except track "Alaipayuthey", written by Oothukkadu Venkatasubba Iyer and "Endrendrum Punngai" written by Praveen Mani & Vaali (poet). Maangalayam written by Vaali (poet). The order of track listing is according to the music cassette or soundtrack CD. The order of tracks in the listing differs in the digital download websites.

Alaipayuthey – Standard edition
No.	Title	Singer(s)	Length
1.	"Endrendrum Punnagai"	Praveen Mani, Clinton Cerejo, Srinivas, Shankar Mahadevan, A. R. Rahman	4:00
2.	"Pachchai Nirame (Sakiye)"	Hariharan, Clinton Cerejo	5:21
3.	"Kadhal Sadugudu (Nagila Nagila)"	S. P. B. Charan, Naveen	4:35
4.	"Evano Oruvan"	Swarnalatha	5:56
5.	"Alaipayuthey"	Harini, Kalyani Menon, Neyveli Ramalakshmi	3:34
6.	"Snegithane Snegithane"	Sadhana Sargam, Srinivas	6:05
7.	"Maangalyam"	Clinton Cerejo, Srinivas, A. R. Rahman	1:41
8.	"Yaro Yarodi"	Mahalakshmi Iyer, Vaishali Samant, Richa Sharma	5:46
9.	"September Madham"	Asha Bhosle, Shankar Mahadevan	5:08
Total length:			42:52

Alaipayuthey – Bonus track edition
No.	Title	Singer(s)	Length
10.	"Snegithane Snegithane (Film version)"	Ustad Sultan Khan, Sadhana Sargam, Srinivas	4:53
Total length:			47:45

=== Telugu ===
All lyrics by Veturi. The order of track listing is according to the digital download websites.

Sakhi
No.	Title	Singer(s)	Length
1.	"Kailove Chedugudu"	Naveen, S. P. B. Charan, A. R. Rahman	4:38
2.	"Snehithuda"	Sadhana Sargam, Srinivas	6:07
3.	"Yede Yedeydey"	Sujatha, Subha, Vaishali	5:49
4.	"September Maasam"	Shankar Mahadevan, S. Janaki	5:11
5.	"Alai Pongeraa"	Harini, Kalpana, Kalyani Menon	3:38
6.	"Kalali Poyenu"	Swarnalatha	5:59
7.	"Pachhadanamey"	Hariharan, Clinton Cerejo	5:21
Total length:			36:14

== Album credits ==
Credits adapted from A. R. Rahman's official website.

=== Original ===
Backing vocals: Dominique Cerejo, Clinton Cerejo, Srinvas, Febi, Noell James, Kanchana, Ganga, Chandran, Sriram

==== Personnel ====
- Flute: Naveen kumar
- Guitar: Kabuli
- Nadaswaram: Vasu
- Bass guitars: Keith Peters
- Veena: Vishwamohan Bhatt
- Sarangi: Ustaad Sultan Khan

=== Hindi Version ===
Backing vocals: Karthik, Tipu, Chandran, Clinton Cerejo, Raqeeb Aalam, Febi, Feji, Poornima

Personnel

- Flute: Naveen
- Bass guitars: Keith Peters, Viji
- Dilruba: Saroja
- Sarangi: Ustaad Sultan Khan

Additional programming: Pravin Mani (for the tracks "O Humdum Suniyo Re" and "Chori Pe Chori")

Strings conducted by V. J. Srinivasamurthy

Additional sound design: H. Sridhar

Sound Engineers, H. Sridhar, S. Sivakumar

== Other versions ==
"Kaadhal Sadugudu" was remixed by Sam C. S for the film Madraskaaran (2025) and sung by Adithya RK released on 7 December 2024.
