= Moondram Pirai (soundtrack) =

- Original album cover

Soundtrack album by Ilaiyaraaja
- Released: 1982
- Genre: Feature film soundtrack
- Language: Tamil
- Producer: Ilaiyaraaja

Moondram Pirai is the soundtrack album to the Tamil film of the same name. The music was composed by Ilaiyaraaja, with lyrics by Kannadasan (in his last credit as lyricist), Vairamuthu and Gangai Amaran.

== Overview ==
The soundtrack was released through the record label Agi Music. The number "Kannae Kalaimane", which is based on the Kapi raga, was written by Kannadasan in about two or ten minutes' time, after listening to the film's story and the situation for the song. (Note: The Hindu mentioned Kannadasan took two minutes to pen lyrics for Kanne Kalaimaane however Thyagarajan said he penned the lyrics within ten minutes.)

Both Mahendra and Thyagarajan felt Kannadasan would be the right person to write "Kanne Kalaimaane". Kannadasan, who was unwell at that time, was present at the recording session of the song, which took place in September 1981. Thyagarajan said that, during the recording, Kannadasan called his assistant and told him to write down the lines, "which flowed from him like water from a stream" and he "gave us four options for the pallavi and we all loved Kanne Kalaimaane the best and froze it. For the charanam, he gave us so many options and asked us to pick and choose whatever we liked and left". It was the last song which Kannadasan wrote before his death in October 1981. According to Kannadasan's daughter Kalaiselvi, the song was written with his wife in mind; the lines "Kaathal kondaen kanavinai valarthen ... kanmani unai naan karuthinil niraithen ... unakke uyiraanen ennaalum enai nee maravaathey..." were meant for her. "Poongatru" was based on the Sindhu Bhairavi raga.

The original soundtrack edition of Moondram Pirai does not include the song "Ponmeni Uruguthey", but re-releases of the soundtrack on iTunes and Raaga.com do so, as the fourth and third tracks respectively. "Poongaatru Puthithaanathu" is incorrectly listed on the original soundtrack edition as "Poonkatru Thalattudhu", but this mistake was corrected in the iTunes re-release, while at Raaga.com, it is simply listed as "Poongatru". In all the three soundtrack editions, "Kanne Kalaimane" is the first track, while the track numbering for the other songs vary.

The songs "Kanne Kalaimane" and "Ponmeni Uruguthey" were re-used in same tunes by Ilaiyaraaja in its Hindi remake Sadma (1983), while "Poongatru Puthithanathu", which was replaced by "Ae Zindagi Gale Laga Le", an original composition for the remake.

Composer A. R. Rahman (then known as Dileep Kumar) worked as an assistant on the film as a part of Ilaiyaraaja's team.

== Critical reception ==
The soundtrack received positive critical reception. The song "Ponmeni Uruguthey" that was picturised on Kamal Haasan and Silk Smitha developed cult status. G. Dhananjayan, in his book The Best of Tamil Cinema called the music "outstanding", further saying that the songs contributed significantly to the success of the film. Hari Narayan of The Hindu said, "The lullaby "Kanne Kalaimane" sees the tranquillity reach a crescendo." Another critic from The Hindu, Shankar, called "Vaanengum Thanga" a "dream song". On the song, "Kanne Kalaimane", Balu Mahendra said that it "stirs you to this day". In July 2011, D. Karthikeyan of The Hindu singled out the film's re-recording and ranked it alongside the music director's other films such as Mullum Malarum (1978), Uthiripookkal (1979), Nayakan (1987) and Thalapathi (1991).

== Track listing ==
Track list
No.	Title	Lyrics	Singer(s)	Length
1.	"Kanne Kalaimaane"	Kannadasan	K. J. Yesudas	4:09
2.	"Vaanengum Thanga"	Vairamuthu	S. P. Balasubrahmanyam, S. Janaki	4:34
3.	"Narikathai"	Vairamuthu	Kamal Haasan, Sridevi	4:01
4.	"Ponmeni Uruguthey"	Gangai Amaran	S. Janaki	4:32
5.	"Poongaatru Puthithaanathu"	Kannadasan	K. J. Yesudas	4:18
Total length:				21:34

== Bibliography ==
- Dhananjayan, G. (2011). The Best of Tamil Cinema, 1931 to 2010: 1977–2010. Galatta Media. ISBN 978-81-921043-0-0.
