= Super Singer 10 =

- Season 10
- Super Singer 10

Release
- Original network: Star Vijay
- Original release: 16 December 2023 – 23 June 2024
- Presented by: Ma Ka Pa Anand; Priyanka Deshpande
- Judges: Anuradha Sriram; Sean Roldan; Mano; Sujatha Mohan
- Winner: John Jerome

Season chronology
- ← Previous; Super Singer 9 Next → Super Singer 11

Super Singer Season 10 is a 2023–2024 Indian Tamil-language reality television singing competition show. The tenth season of Super Singer airs every Saturday and Sunday on Star Vijay from 16 December 2023, and streams on Disney+ Hotstar.

Ma Ka Pa Anand and Priyanka Deshpande returned as hosts for this season. The judging panel for this season included four judges: one music composer Sean Roldan, and playback singers, Anuradha Sriram, Mano, and Sujatha Mohan. Anuradha Sriram has been judging this reality singing show from Super Singer Season 1 onwards. Mano and Sujatha Mohan have now joined Super Singer judging panel after both making their permanent judging debut during Super Singer Season 4. Sean Roldan, is the fourth new judge to join the Super Singer judging panel.

The Grand Finale was held on 23 June 2024. At the finals, John Jerome was the title winner.

== Format ==
The mega auditions had commenced with the 25 contestants, with 11 male contestants and 14 female contestants. These contestants had been shortlisted and categorised as eligible by the four main judges to participate in this competitive singing contest. After the audition round, there several rounds of performances take place with eliminations as a process to select the title winner of the season. The major auditions took place on 26 September 2023, in major cities in Tamil Nadu. Disney+ Hotstar (the streaming partner for the show) outlined several terms and conditions prior to the auditions. The golden shower performances are being offered to contestants who had performed exceptionally and have impressed the four main judges. The golden shower performance concept was introduced from Super Singer Junior (season 9). This includes all the contestants who have scored golden performances should have given their hundred percent effort in their singing, with correct techniques, sufficient improvisations, good voice quality, clear pronunciations, good breath control and many more factors taken in consideration. After they receive a golden shower, they would also be presented with a gold coin.

Mani and band, who was inaugurated into the show by Srinivas in 2006, regularly accompany the contestants in a weekly basis, where Karthick Devaraj, a keyboardist, is also part of the Mani and Band.

== Judges ==
Judge	Description
Anuradha Sriram	A Carnatic musician, playback singer and child actress who hails from the Indian state of Tamil Nadu. She has sung more than 2000 songs in Tamil, Telugu, Sinhala, Malayalam, Kannada, Bengali and Hindi films. She has also judged in other reality television singing competitions, such as Top Singer (Malayalam), Star Singer (Malayalam), Sun Singer (Tamil).
Sean Roldan	An Indian composer, musician, and lyricist who predominantly works in the Tamil film industry.
Sujatha Mohan	A playback singer who is popular for singing in Malayalam, Tamil and Telugu movies. She has also judged in other reality television singing competitions, such as Sa Re Ga Ma Pa Seniors Tamil Season 1 and Season 2, Sa Re Ga Ma Pa Lil Champs Tamil Season 1 and 2, Star Singer (Malayalam), Sa Re Ga Ma Pa Keralam, Super 4 (Malayalam)

== Contestants ==
Contestants were selected by the four main judges Sean Roldan, Anuradha Sriram, Mano and Sujatha Mohan (during the mega audition rounds) and have been given the opportunity to progress into the competition are listed below, revealed by their names, hometown and hometown state.

Name	Hometown	Hometown State
John Jerome	Kallakurichi	Tamil Nadu
Anagai Settu (Gana Setu)	Cuddalore	Tamil Nadu
Gana Merlin	Vellore	Tamil Nadu
Vignesh Raju	Coimbatore	Tamil Nadu
Padmaja Srinivasan	Chennai	Tamil Nadu
P. Lincy Diana	Perambalur	Tamil Nadu
Karthikeyan	Neyveli	Tamil Nadu
N.R.K Arun	Chennai	Tamil Nadu
Sanjiv Raju	Chennai	Tamil Nadu
Sreenidhi Ramakrishnan	Coimbatore	Tamil Nadu
Shriyaa Vishnuram	Chennai	Tamil Nadu
Yamini Ghantasala	Chennai	Tamil Nadu
Srinidhi Sriprakash (Srinidhi)	Kanchipuram	Tamil Nadu
Vikram Pitty	Chennai	Tamil Nadu
Jeevitha Pannerselvam	Tiruvannamalai	Tamil Nadu
Daisey Yensone (Daisey)	Thoothukudi	Tamil Nadu
Aishwerya Radhakrishnan	Mannargudi	Tamil Nadu
Ka. Suresh	Coimbatore	Tamil Nadu
Mihitha Rajavenkatesh	Chennai	Tamil Nadu
Thanseera Jahan	Thiruvananthapuram	Kerala
Vaishnavi Kovvuri (Vaishnavi)	Chennai	Tamil Nadu
Shruthi Shekar	Chennai	Tamil Nadu
S. Rajiv Gandhi	Mannargudi	Tamil Nadu
E. Kalidhasan	Pudukkottai	Tamil Nadu
Na. Veeramani	Nagapattinam	Tamil Nadu

== Episodes ==
After every round has taken place, the judging panel would select the best performers (BP) of the week and the best entertainers (BE) of the week.

Episode number	Air date(s)	Round name	Best performers (weekly)	Special guest(s) and judge(s)
1	16 December 2023	Grand launch -> auditions		Former Super Singer Senior contestants Former Super Singer Junior contestants Nithyashree Venkataraman (Super Singer) KJ Iyenar (Super Singer) Prasanna Adhisesha (Super Singer)
2	17 December 2023	Grand launch -> auditions		Former Super Singer Senior contestants Former Super Singer Junior contestants Nithyashree Venkataraman (Super Singer) KJ Iyenar (Super Singer) Prasanna Adhisesha (Super Singer)
3	23 December 2023	Favourite songs		
4	24 December 2023	Favourite songs		
5	30 December 2023	Favourite songs	1) Best Performer of the Week (BP) – Sreenidhi Ramakrishnan 2) Best Performer of the Week (BP) – Na.Veeramanai	
6	31 December 2023	Favourite songs	1) Best Performer of the Week (BP) – Sreenidhi Ramakrishnan 2) Best Performer of the Week (BP) – Na.Veeramanai	
7	6 January 2024	Greatest hits	1) Best Performer of the Week (BP) – Daisey Yensone 2) Best Performer of the Week (BP) – Sanjiv Raju 3) Best Performer of the Week (BP) – Vignesh Raju	
8	7 January 2024	Greatest hits	1) Best Performer of the Week (BP) – Daisey Yensone 2) Best Performer of the Week (BP) – Sanjiv Raju 3) Best Performer of the Week (BP) – Vignesh Raju	
9	13 January 2024	Makkal Isai	1) Best Performer of the Week (BP) – Vignesh Raju 2) Good Performance of the Week - Vikram Pitty 3) Good Performance of the Week - Srinidhi Sriprakash 4) Good Performance of the Week - P. Lincy Diana 5) Good Performance of the Week - Jeevitha Pannerselvam	Velmurugan (singer); Malathy Lakshman (singer); Mathichiyam Bala (singer)
10	20 January 2024	Makkal Isai	1) Best Performer of the Week (BP) – Vignesh Raju 2) Good Performance of the Week - Vikram Pitty 3) Good Performance of the Week - Srinidhi Sriprakash 4) Good Performance of the Week - P. Lincy Diana 5) Good Performance of the Week - Jeevitha Pannerselvam	Pragathi Guruprasad (Super Singer); Sundarayyar (singer) V.M. Mahalingam (singer); Grace Karunas (singer/actress); Kidakkuzhi Mariyammal (singer)
11	21 January 2024	Makkal Isai	1) Best Performer of the Week (BP) – Vignesh Raju 2) Good Performance of the Week - Vikram Pitty 3) Good Performance of the Week - Srinidhi Sriprakash 4) Good Performance of the Week - P. Lincy Diana 5) Good Performance of the Week - Jeevitha Pannerselvam	Pragathi Guruprasad (Super Singer); Sundarayyar (singer) V.M. Mahalingam (singer); Grace Karunas (singer/actress); Kidakkuzhi Mariyammal (singer)
12	27 January 2024	Endrendrum captain (Vijayakanth)	1) Best Performer of the Week (BP) – John Jerome 2) Good Performance of the Week - Jeevitha Pannerselvam 3) Good Performance of the Week - Daisey Yensone 4) Good Performance of the Week - Sreenidhi Ramakrishnan 5) Good Performance of the Week - Vaishnavi Kovvuri	Radha (actress); R. K. Selvamani (director) R. Aravindraj (director) V . M. Shreenitha (Super Singer) V. Shivathmika (Super Singer) B. Harshini Nethra (Super Singer) Akshara Lakshmi (Super Singer) Ananya (Super Singer) Richa Syjan Meghna Sumesh
13	28 January 2024	Endrendrum captain (Vijayakanth)	1) Best Performer of the Week (BP) – John Jerome 2) Good Performance of the Week - Jeevitha Pannerselvam 3) Good Performance of the Week - Daisey Yensone 4) Good Performance of the Week - Sreenidhi Ramakrishnan 5) Good Performance of the Week - Vaishnavi Kovvuri	Radha (actress); R. K. Selvamani (director) R. Aravindraj (director) V . M. Shreenitha (Super Singer) V. Shivathmika (Super Singer) B. Harshini Nethra (Super Singer) Akshara Lakshmi (Super Singer) Ananya (Super Singer) Richa Syjan Meghna Sumesh
14	3 February 2024	Wedding hits	1) Best Performer of the Week (BP) – P. Lincy Diana 2) Best Performer of the Week (BP) - Vaishnavi Kovvuri 3) Best Performer of the Week (BP) - Daisey Yensone 4) Best Performer of the Week (BP) - Thanseera Jahanan	Sivaangi Krishnakumar (Host / Super Singer) Nithyashree Venkataraman (Super Singer)
15	4 February 2024	Wedding hits	1) Best Performer of the Week (BP) – P. Lincy Diana 2) Best Performer of the Week (BP) - Vaishnavi Kovvuri 3) Best Performer of the Week (BP) - Daisey Yensone 4) Best Performer of the Week (BP) - Thanseera Jahanan	Sivaangi Krishnakumar (Host / Super Singer) Nithyashree Venkataraman (Super Singer)
16	10 February 2024	Bhakthi Thiruvizha	1) Best Performer of the Week (BP) – E. Kalidhasan 2) Best Performer of the Week (BP) - Daisey Yensone 3) Best Performer of the Week (BP) - Sreenidhi Ramakrishnan; 4) Best Performer of the Week (BP) - Vaishnavi Kovvuri	T. L. Maharajan (singer) Veeramani Raju Vinusha Devi (actress)
17	11 February 2024	Bhakthi Thiruvizha	1) Best Performer of the Week (BP) – E. Kalidhasan 2) Best Performer of the Week (BP) - Daisey Yensone 3) Best Performer of the Week (BP) - Sreenidhi Ramakrishnan; 4) Best Performer of the Week (BP) - Vaishnavi Kovvuri	T. L. Maharajan (singer) Veeramani Raju Vinusha Devi (actress)
18	17 February 2024	Kadhal hits	1) Best Performer of the Week (BP) - Vignesh Raju 2) Best Performer of the Week (BP) - Shruthi Shekar 3) Best Performer of the Week (BP) - Srinidhi Sriprakash 4) Best Performer of the Week (BP) - Sreenidhi Ramakrishnan 5) Best Performer of the Week (BP) - Daisey Yensone	Jayam Ravi (actor); K. Manikandan (actor, filmmaker); Rakshita Suresh (singer/Super Singer); Ajesh Ashok (Super Singer); Srinisha Jayaseelan (Super Singer); Sam Vishal (Super Singer) Sathyaprakash Dharmar (Super Singer) Sreekanth Hariharan (Super Singer)
19	18 February 2024	Kadhal hits	1) Best Performer of the Week (BP) - Vignesh Raju 2) Best Performer of the Week (BP) - Shruthi Shekar 3) Best Performer of the Week (BP) - Srinidhi Sriprakash 4) Best Performer of the Week (BP) - Sreenidhi Ramakrishnan 5) Best Performer of the Week (BP) - Daisey Yensone	Jayam Ravi (actor); K. Manikandan (actor, filmmaker); Rakshita Suresh (singer/Super Singer); Ajesh Ashok (Super Singer); Srinisha Jayaseelan (Super Singer); Sam Vishal (Super Singer) Sathyaprakash Dharmar (Super Singer) Sreekanth Hariharan (Super Singer)
20	24 February 2024	Thala Thalapthy hits	1) Best Performer of the Week (BP) - Vaishnavi Kovvuri 2) Best Performer of the Week (BP) - Srinidhi Sriprakash 3) Best Performer of the Week (BP) - Jeevitha Pannerselvam 4) Best Performer of the Week (BP) - Vignesh Raju 5) Best Performer of the Week (BP) - Sreenidhi Ramakrishnan	K. S. Ravikumar (director, actor); Dheena (actor); Pavani Reddy (actress); Mahendran (actor)
21	25 February 2024	Thala Thalapthy hits	1) Best Performer of the Week (BP) - Vaishnavi Kovvuri 2) Best Performer of the Week (BP) - Srinidhi Sriprakash 3) Best Performer of the Week (BP) - Jeevitha Pannerselvam 4) Best Performer of the Week (BP) - Vignesh Raju 5) Best Performer of the Week (BP) - Sreenidhi Ramakrishnan	K. S. Ravikumar (director, actor); Dheena (actor); Pavani Reddy (actress); Mahendran (actor)
22	2 March 2024	Rockstar Mano 40	1) Best Performer of the Week (BP) - 2) Best Performer of the Week (BP) - 3) Best Performer of the Week (BP) - 4) Best Performer of the Week (BP) - 5) Best Performer of the Week (BP) -	Unni Menon (singer); Malgudi Subha (singer); Kalpana Raghavendar (singer)
23	3 March 2024	Rockstar Mano 40	1) Best Performer of the Week (BP) - 2) Best Performer of the Week (BP) - 3) Best Performer of the Week (BP) - 4) Best Performer of the Week (BP) - 5) Best Performer of the Week (BP) -	Unni Menon (singer); Malgudi Subha (singer); Kalpana Raghavendar (singer)

== Performances ==
All performances include the contestants performing the songs to progress into the next round.

=== Launch and auditions – (episodes 1 and 2) ===
Name of the Performer(s)	Name of Song	Lyricist	Name of Film/Album	Singer(s)	Composer(s)
P. Lincy Diana	Vaa Vaa Pakkam Vaa	Muthulingam	Thanga Magan (1983 film)	S. P. Balasubrahmanyam, Vani Jairam	Ilaiyaraaja
Karthikeyan	Theradi Veethiyile	Na. Muthukumar	Run (2002 film)	Karthik, Manikka Vinayagam, Timmy	Vidyasagar
N.R.K Arun	Theradi Veethiyile	Na. Muthukumar	Run (2002 film)	Karthik, Manikka Vinayagam, Timmy	Vidyasagar
Sanjiv Raju	Theradi Veethiyile	Na. Muthukumar	Run (2002 film)	Karthik, Manikka Vinayagam, Timmy	Vidyasagar
Vignesh	Thamarai Poovukum	Vairamuthu	Pasumpon (1995 film)	Sujatha Mohan, Krishnachandran	Vidyasagar
Padmaja Srinivasan	Thamarai Poovukum	Vairamuthu	Pasumpon (1995 film)	Sujatha Mohan, Krishnachandran	Vidyasagar
Sreenidhi Ramakrishnan	Kannodu Kaanbadhellam	Vairamuthu	Jeans (1998 film)	Nithyasree Mahadevan	A. R. Rahman
Shriyaa Vishnuram	Kannodu Kaanbadhellam	Vairamuthu	Jeans (1998 film)	Nithyasree Mahadevan	A. R. Rahman
John Jerome	Pachamala Poovu	R. V. Udayakumar	Kizhakku Vaasal (1990 film)	S. P. Balasubrahmanyam	Ilaiyaraaja
Anagai Settu (Gana Setu)	Dolakku Dakku Pathini	Not Applicable	Gana Ulagam	Palani	Kanmani Raja Mohammad
Gana Merlin	Dolakku Dakku Pathini	Not Applicable	Gana Ulagam	Palani	Kanmani Raja Mohammad
Yamini Ghantasala	Vaan Megam Poo Poovaai	Vairamuthu	Punnagai Mannan (1986 film)	K. S. Chithra	Ilaiyaraaja
Srinidhi Sriprakash	Ada Ennaatha	Perarasu	Sivakasi (2005 film)	Anuradha Sriram, Udit Narayan	Srikanth Deva
Vikram Pitty	Ada Ennaatha	Perarasu	Sivakasi (2005 film)	Anuradha Sriram, Udit Narayan	Srikanth Deva
Jeevitha Pannerselvam	Mana Madurai (Ooh La La La)	Vairamuthu	Minsara Kanavu (1997 film)	K. S. Chithra, Unni Menon, Srinivas	A. R. Rahman
Daisey Yensone	Mana Madurai (Ooh La La La)	Vairamuthu	Minsara Kanavu (1997 film)	K. S. Chithra, Unni Menon, Srinivas	A. R. Rahman
Aishwerya Radhakrishnan	Mana Madurai (Ooh La La La)	Vairamuthu	Minsara Kanavu (1997 film)	K. S. Chithra, Unni Menon, Srinivas	A. R. Rahman
Ka. Suresh	Kadhorum Lolakku	Vaali	Sinna Mapplai (1993 film)	Mano, S. Janaki	Ilaiyaraaja
Mihitha Rajavenkatesh	Kadhorum Lolakku	Vaali	Sinna Mapplai (1993 film)	Mano, S. Janaki	Ilaiyaraaja
Thanseera Jahan	Kannalanae	Vairamuthu	Bombay (1994 film)	K. S. Chithra, A. R. Rahman	A. R. Rahman
Vaishnavi Kovvuri	Manam Virumbuthey	Vairamuthu	Nerrukku Ner (1997 film)	Harini (version 1), P. Unnikrishnan (version 2)	Deva
Shruthi Shekar	Manam Virumbuthey	Vairamuthu	Nerrukku Ner (1997 film)	Harini (version 1), P. Unnikrishnan (version 2)	Deva
S. Rajiv Gandhi	Odakara Orathile	Anthony Daasan	Anthony in Party	Anthony Daasan	Anthony Daasan
E. Kalidhasan	Odakara Orathile	Anthony Daasan	Anthony in Party	Anthony Daasan	Anthony Daasan
Na. Veeramani	Odakara Orathile	Anthony Daasan	Anthony in Party	Anthony Daasan	Anthony Daasan

Indicates the contestant has not achieved a golden performance for the round because of their insufficient performance level marked by the judges.

Indicates the contestant has been eliminated due to inadequate performance marked by the judges.

Indicates the contestant has been given a golden performance shower for their sufficient performance marked by the judging panel.

=== Favourite songs round – (episodes 3, 4, 5 and 6) ===
Name of the Performer(s)	Name of Song	Lyricist	Name of Film/Album	Singer(s)	Composer(s)	Round Status
Shriyaa Vishnuram	Poraney Poraney	Karthik Netha	Vaagai Sooda Vaa (2011 film)	Neha Bhasin, Ranjith	Ghibran	PROGRESS TO NEXT ROUND
Karthikeyan	Kadhaippoma	Ko Sesha	Oh My Kadavule (2020 film)	Sid Sriram	Leon James	PROGRESS TO NEXT ROUND
Aishwerya Radhakrishnan	Poove Vai Pesum Pothu	Vairamuthu	12B (2001 film)	Mahalakshmi Iyer, Harish Raghavendra	Harris Jayaraj	PROGRESS TO NEXT ROUND
Ka. Suresh	Ooruvittu Ooruvanthu	Gangai Amaran	Karakattakkaran (1989 film)	Malaysia Vasudevan, Gangai Amaran	Ilaiyaraaja	GOLDEN PERFORMER SAFE AND PROGRESS TO NEXT ROUND
E.Kalidhasan	Maane Unna	Vadivelu, Raja Gurusam	Raajavamsam (2021 film)	Sam C. S., Anthakudi Ilayaraja, Sathish	Sam C. S.	PROGRESS TO NEXT ROUND
Shruthi Shekar	Adiye Enna Engae Nee Kootti Pora	Madhan Karky	Kadal (2013 film)	Sid Sriram, Maria Roe Vincent	A. R. Rahman	GOLDEN PERFORMER SAFE AND PROGRESS TO NEXT ROUND AND BEST PERFORMER OF THE WEEK
Jeevitha Pannerselvam	Sendhoora Poove	Gangai Amaran	16 Vayathinile (1977 film)	S. Janaki	Ilaiyaraaja	GOLDEN PERFORMER SAFE AND PROGRESS TO NEXT ROUND
N.R.K Arun	Aval Ulaghazhagi	Vaali	Lesa Lesa (2003 film)	Karthik	Harris Jayaraj	PROGRESS TO NEXT ROUND
Mihitha Rajavenkatesh	Niththam Niththam	Gangai Amaran	Mullum Malarum (1978 film)	Vani Jairam	Ilaiyaraaja	PROGRESS TO NEXT ROUND
John Jerome	Arachcha Santhanam	Gangai Amaran	Chinna Thambi (1991 film)	S. P. Balasubrahmanyam	Ilaiyaraaja	GOLDEN PERFORMER SAFE AND PROGRESS TO NEXT ROUND
Vaishnavi Kovvuri (Vaishnavi)	Oru Poiyavadhu	Vairamuthu	Jodi (1999 film)	Hariharan (version 1); Srinivas, Sujatha Mohan (version 2)	A. R. Rahman	GOLDEN PERFORMER SAFE AND PROGRESS TO NEXT ROUND AND BEST PERFORMER OF THE WEEK
Vignesh	Poi Solla Koodathu	Arivumathi	Run (2002 film)	Hariharan, Sadhana Sargam	Vidyasagar	GOLDEN PERFORMER SAFE AND PROGRESS TO NEXT ROUND
Anagai Settu (Gana Setu)	En Veetula	Lalithanand	Idharkuthane Aasaipattai Balakumara (2013 film)	Gana Bala	Siddharth Vipin	GOLDEN PERFORMER SAFE AND PROGRESS TO NEXT ROUND
Na. Veeramani	Madura Kulunga Kulunga	Yugabharathi, James Vasanthan	Subramaniapuram (2008 film)	Suchitra, Velmurugan, Surmukhi Raman, Madurai Bhanumathi	James Vasanthan	GOLDEN PERFORMER SAFE AND PROGRESS TO NEXT ROUND
Thanseera Jahan	Thirumana Malargal	Vairamuthu	Poovellam Un Vaasam (2001 film)	Swarnalatha	Vidyasagar	PROGRESS TO NEXT ROUND
Sanjiv Raju	Elangaathu Veesudhey	Palani Bharathi	Pithamagan (2003 film)	Shreya Ghoshal, Sriram Parthasarathy	Ilaiyaraaja	GOLDEN PERFORMER SAFE AND PROGRESS TO NEXT ROUND
Srinidhi Sriprakash (Srinidhi)	Snegithane Snegithane	Vairamuthu	Alai Payuthey (2000 film)	Sadhana Sargam, Srinivas	A. R. Rahman	GOLDEN PERFORMER SAFE AND PROGRESS TO NEXT ROUND
Sreenidhi Ramakrishnan	Poovaasam	Vairamuthu	Anbe Sivam (2003 film)	Vijay Prakash, Sriram Parthasarathy, Sadhana Sargam	Vidyasagar	GOLDEN PERFORMER SAFE AND PROGRESS TO NEXT ROUND
S. Rajiv Gandhi	Pathu Masam Enna Sumandhu	Not Applicable	Not Applicable	Velmurugan	Velmurugan	GOLDEN PERFORMER SAFE AND PROGRESS TO NEXT ROUND
Vikram Pitty	Thaniye Thannanthaniye ( Carnatic raga: Ananda Bhairavi )	Vairamuthu	Rhythm (2000 film)	Shankar Mahadevan	A. R. Rahman	GOLDEN PERFORMER SAFE AND PROGRESS TO NEXT ROUND
Yamini Ghantasala	Mannipaaya	Thamarai	Vinnaithaandi Varuvaayaa (2010 film)	Shreya Ghoshal, A. R. Rahman	A. R. Rahman	PROGRESS TO NEXT ROUND
Gana Merlin	Chennai Thanga Porantha Ooru	Not Applicable	Chennai Song	Gaana Sakthi	Gaana Sakthi	PROGRESS TO NEXT ROUND
P. Lincy Diana	Edho Moham Edho Dhagam	Vairamuthu	Kozhi Koovuthu (1982 film)	S. Janaki, Krishnachandran	Ilaiyaraaja	PROGRESS TO NEXT ROUND
Padmaja Srinivasan	Silendra Theepori Ondru	Vairamuthu	Thithikudhe (2003 film)	Sujatha Mohan	Vidyasagar	PROGRESS TO NEXT ROUND
Daisey Yensone (Daisey)	Malargal Kaettaen	Vairamuthu	O Kadhal Kanmani (2015 film)	K. S. Chithra, A. R. Rahman	A. R. Rahman	PROGRESS TO NEXT ROUND

Indicates the contestant has not achieved a golden performance for the round because of their insufficient performance level marked by the judges.

Indicates the contestant has been eliminated due to inadequate performance marked by the judges.

Indicates the contestant has been given a golden performance shower for their sufficient performance marked by the judging panel, and will progress to the next round.

Indicates the contestant has been allowed to progress to the next round by the judging panel.

=== Greatest hits round – (episodes 7 and 8) ===
Name of the Performer(s)	Name of Song	Lyricist	Name of Film/Album	Singer(s)	Composer(s)	Round Status
Sreenidhi Ramakrishnan	Ninnukori Varnam	Rajasri	Agni Natchathiram (1987 film)	K. S. Chithra	Ilaiyaraaja	GOLDEN PERFORMER SAFE AND PROGRESS TO NEXT ROUND
Vaishnavi Kovvuri (Vaishnavi)	Ninnukori Varnam	Rajasri	Agni Natchathiram (1987 film)	K. S. Chithra	Ilaiyaraaja	GOLDEN PERFORMER SAFE AND PROGRESS TO NEXT ROUND
S. Rajiv Gandhi	Pothuvaaga En Manasu Thangam	Panchu Arunachalam	Murattu Kaalai (1980 film)	Malaysia Vasudevan	Ilaiyaraaja	GOLDEN PERFORMER SAFE AND PROGRESS TO NEXT ROUND
E.Kalidhasan	Pothuvaaga En Manasu Thangam	Panchu Arunachalam	Murattu Kaalai (1980 film)	Malaysia Vasudevan	Ilaiyaraaja	GOLDEN PERFORMER SAFE AND PROGRESS TO NEXT ROUND
P. Lincy Diana	Andhi Mazhai Pozhikirathu	Vairamuthu	Raja Paarvai (1981 film)	S. P. Balasubrahmanyam, S. Janaki, T. V. Gopalakrishnan	Ilaiyaraaja	PROGRESS TO NEXT ROUND
Vikram Pitty	Andhi Mazhai Pozhikirathu	Vairamuthu	Raja Paarvai (1981 film)	S. P. Balasubrahmanyam, S. Janaki, T. V. Gopalakrishnan	Ilaiyaraaja	PROGRESS TO NEXT ROUND
Thanseera Jahan	Entha Poovilum	Panchu Arunachalam	Murattu Kaalai (1980 film)	S. Janaki	Ilaiyaraaja	PROGRESS TO NEXT ROUND
Daisey Yensone (Daisey)	Shenbagame Shenbagame	Gangai Amaran	Enga Ooru Pattukaran (1987 film)	Asha Bhosle (version 1); Mano, Sunanda (version 2)	Ilaiyaraaja	GOLDEN PERFORMER SAFE AND PROGRESS TO NEXT ROUND
Aishwerya Radhakrishnan	Shenbagame Shenbagame	Gangai Amaran	Enga Ooru Pattukaran (1987 film)	Asha Bhosle (version 1); Mano, Sunanda (version 2)	Ilaiyaraaja	GOLDEN PERFORMER SAFE AND PROGRESS TO NEXT ROUND
Ka. Suresh	Naan Thedum Sevanthi ( Carnatic raga: Hindolam )	Kanmani Subbu	Dharma Pathini (1986 film)	S. Janaki, Ilaiyaraaja	Ilaiyaraaja	GOLDEN PERFORMER SAFE AND PROGRESS TO NEXT ROUND
Mihitha Rajavenkatesh	Poojaiketha Poovidhu	Vairamuthu	Neethana Antha Kuyil (1986 film)	K. S. Chithra, Gangai Amaran	Ilaiyaraaja	ELIMINATED
Na. Veeramani	Poojaiketha Poovidhu	Vairamuthu	Neethana Antha Kuyil (1986 film)	K. S. Chithra, Gangai Amaran	Ilaiyaraaja	DANGER ZONE – PROGRESS TO NEXT ROUND
John Jerome	Nee Pathi Naan Pathi	Vaali	Keladi Kannmanii (1990 film)	K. J. Yesudas, Uma Ramanan	Ilaiyaraaja	GOLDEN PERFORMER SAFE AND PROGRESS TO NEXT ROUND
Jeevitha Pannerselvam	Nee Pathi Naan Pathi	Vaali	Keladi Kannmanii (1990 film)	K. J. Yesudas, Uma Ramanan	Ilaiyaraaja	GOLDEN PERFORMER SAFE AND PROGRESS TO NEXT ROUND
Yamini Ghantasala	Roja Poo Adivanthathu	Vaali	Agni Natchathiram (1987 film)	S. Janaki	Ilaiyaraaja	GOLDEN PERFORMER SAFE AND PROGRESS TO NEXT ROUND
Shriyaa Vishnuram	Vellai Pura Onru	Vairamuthu	Puthukavithai (1982 film)	K. J. Yesudas, S. Janaki	Ilaiyaraaja	GOLDEN PERFORMER SAFE AND PROGRESS TO NEXT ROUND
Sanjiv Raju	Vellai Pura Onru	Vairamuthu	Puthukavithai (1982 film)	K. J. Yesudas, S. Janaki	Ilaiyaraaja	GOLDEN PERFORMER SAFE AND PROGRESS TO NEXT ROUND
Padmaja Srinivasan	Ore Naal Unnai Naan	Vaali	Ilamai Oonjal Aadukirathu (1978 film)	S. P. Balasubrahmanyam, Vani Jairam	Ilaiyaraaja	GOLDEN PERFORMER SAFE AND PROGRESS TO NEXT ROUND
Karthikeyan	Ilamai Enum Poongaatru	Kannadasan	Pagalil Oru Iravu (1979 film)	S. P. Balasubrahmanyam	Ilaiyaraaja	PROGRESS TO NEXT ROUND
N.R.K Arun	Idho Idho En Pallavi	Vairamuthu	Sigaram (1991 film)	S. P. Balasubrahmanyam, K. S. Chithra	S. P. Balasubrahmanyam	DANGER ZONE – PROGRESS TO NEXT ROUND
Srinidhi Sriprakash (Srinidhi)	Idho Idho En Pallavi	Vairamuthu	Sigaram (1991 film)	S. P. Balasubrahmanyam, K. S. Chithra	S. P. Balasubrahmanyam	GOLDEN PERFORMER SAFE AND PROGRESS TO NEXT ROUND
Anagai Settu (Gana Setu)	Yeh Aatha	Gangai Amaran	Payanangal Mudivathillai (1982 film) – version 1 Malaikottai (2007 film) – version 2	S. P. Balasubrahmanyam (version 1) Anuradha Sriram, Tippu (version 2)	Ilaiyaraaja (version 1); Mani Sharma (version 2)	GOLDEN PERFORMER SAFE AND PROGRESS TO NEXT ROUND
Gana Merlin	Yeh Aatha	Gangai Amaran	Payanangal Mudivathillai (1982 film) – version 1 Malaikottai (2007 film) – version 2	S. P. Balasubrahmanyam (version 1) Anuradha Sriram, Tippu (version 2)	Ilaiyaraaja (version 1) Mani Sharma (version 2)	ELIMINATED
Shruthi Shekar	Santhana Kaatre	Vaali	Thanikattu Raja (1982 film)	S. P. Balasubrahmanyam, S. Janaki	Ilaiyaraaja	GOLDEN PERFORMER SAFE AND PROGRESS TO NEXT ROUND
Vignesh	Santhana Kaatre	Vaali	Thanikattu Raja (1982 film)	S. P. Balasubrahmanyam, S. Janaki	Ilaiyaraaja	GOLDEN PERFORMER SAFE AND PROGRESS TO NEXT ROUND

Indicates the contestant has not achieved a golden performance for the round because of their insufficient performance level marked by the judges.

Indicates the contestant has been eliminated due to inadequate performance marked by the judges.

Indicates the contestant has been given a golden performance shower for their sufficient performance marked by the judging panel, and will progress to the next round.

Indicates the contestant has been allowed to progress to the next round by the judging panel.

Indicates the contestant was placed in danger zone and has been allowed to progress to the next round by the judging panel.

=== Makkal Isai round – (episodes 9, 10 and 11) ===
Name of the Performer(s)	Name of Song	Lyricist	Name of Film/Album	Singer(s)	Composer(s)	Round Status
Aishwerya Radhakrishnan	Nee Kattum Selai	Palani Bharathi	Pudhiya Mannargal (1994 film)	Sujatha Mohan, T. L. Maharajan	A. R. Rahman	GOLDEN PERFORMER SAFE AND PROGRESS TO NEXT ROUND
Vikram Pitty	Nee Kattum Selai	Palani Bharathi	Pudhiya Mannargal (1994 film)	Sujatha Mohan, T. L. Maharajan	A. R. Rahman	GOLDEN PERFORMER SAFE AND PROGRESS TO NEXT ROUND
Sreenidhi Ramakrishnan	Kannu Rendum	Viveka	Kutty (2010 film)	Priya Himesh, Mukesh Mohamed	Devi Sri Prasad	GOLDEN PERFORMER SAFE AND PROGRESS TO NEXT ROUND
Karthikeyan	Aadungada Yennai Suththi	Kabilan	Pokkiri (2007 film)	Naveen	Mani Sharma	ELIMINATED
N.R.K Arun	Aadungada Yennai Suththi	Kabilan	Pokkiri (2007 film)	Naveen	Mani Sharma	PROGRESS TO NEXT ROUND
S. Rajiv Gandhi	Thanjavooru Mannu Eduthu	Vairamuthu	Porkkaalam (1997 film)	Krishnaraj	Deva	ELIMINATED
Jeevitha Pannerselvam	Podinadaya Poravare	Gangai Amaran	Kadalora Kavithaigal (1986 film)	K. S. Chithra	Ilaiyaraaja	GOLDEN PERFORMER SAFE AND PROGRESS TO NEXT ROUND
Vignesh	Kurukku Chiruththavale	Vairamuthu	Mudhalvan (1999 film)	Hariharan, Mahalakshmi Iyer	A. R. Rahman	GOLDEN PERFORMER SAFE AND PROGRESS TO NEXT ROUND
Vaishnavi Kovvuri (Vaishnavi)	Kurukku Chiruththavale	Vairamuthu	Mudhalvan (1999 film)	Hariharan, Mahalakshmi Iyer	A. R. Rahman	GOLDEN PERFORMER SAFE AND PROGRESS TO NEXT ROUND
Shriyaa Vishnuram	Aasayilae	Gangai Amaran	Enga Ooru Kavakkaran (1988 film)	Mano, P. Susheela	Ilaiyaraaja	GOLDEN PERFORMER SAFE AND PROGRESS TO NEXT ROUND
Thanseera Jahan	Kotta Paakkum	Vairamuthu	Nattamai (1994 film)	Mano, S. Janaki	Sirpy	PROGRESS TO NEXT ROUND
Ka.Suresh	Kotta Paakkum	Vairamuthu	Nattamai (1994 film)	Mano, S. Janaki	Sirpy	ELIMINATED
Na. Veeramani	Aadungada	Kabilan	Naadodigal (2009 film)	Velmurugan	Sundar C. Babu	PROGRESS TO NEXT ROUND
Daisey Yensone (Daisey)	Poraale Ponnuthayi	Vairamuthu	Karuthamma (1994 film)	Swarnalatha (sad version); Unni Menon, Sujatha Mohan	A. R. Rahman	PROGRESS TO NEXT ROUND
E.Kalidhasan	Maane Maane	Anthony Daasan	Uriyadi (2016 film)	Anthony Daasan, Masala Coffee (version 1); Siddharth (unplugged)	Anthony Daasan (version 1); Vishal Chandrashekhar(unplugged)	GOLDEN PERFORMER SAFE AND PROGRESS TO NEXT ROUND
Srinidhi Sriprakash (Srinidhi)	Kandaa Vara Sollunga	Mari Selvaraj	Karnan (2021 film)	Santhosh Narayanan, Kidakkuzhi Mariyammal	Santhosh Narayanan	GOLDEN PERFORMER SAFE AND PROGRESS TO NEXT ROUND
P. Lincy Diana	Madurai Veeran	Arivumathi	Dhool (2003 film)	Paravai Muniyamma	Vidyasagar	GOLDEN PERFORMER SAFE AND PROGRESS TO NEXT ROUND
Shruthi Shekar	Gaana Karunkuyile	Ponnadiyaan	Sethu (1999 film)	Kovai Kamala	Ilaiyaraaja	PROGRESS TO NEXT ROUND
Yamini Ghantasala	Kaattu Payale	Snehan	Soorarai Pottru (2020 film)	Dhee	G. V. Prakash Kumar	PROGRESS TO NEXT ROUND
Anagai Settu (Gana Setu)	Vidha Vidhama	Deva	Kaadhale Nimmadhi (1998 film)	Deva	Deva	PROGRESS TO NEXT ROUND
Sanjiv Raju	Thiruvizhannu Vantha	Not Applicable	Jayam (2003 film)	Tippu, Ganga Sitharasu	R. P. Patnaik	GOLDEN PERFORMER SAFE AND PROGRESS TO NEXT ROUND
Padmaja Srinivasan	Madura Marikozhunthu Vaasam	Not Applicable	Enga Ooru Kavakkaran (1988 film)	Mano, K. S. Chithra	Ilaiyaraaja	PROGRESS TO NEXT ROUND
John Jerome	Madura Marikozhunthu Vaasam	Not Applicable	Enga Ooru Kavakkaran (1988 film)	Mano, K. S. Chithra	Ilaiyaraaja	GOLDEN PERFORMER SAFE AND PROGRESS TO NEXT ROUND

Indicates the contestant has not achieved a golden performance for the round because of their insufficient performance level marked by the judges.

Indicates the contestant has been eliminated due to inadequate performance marked by the judges.

Indicates the contestant has been given a golden performance shower for their sufficient performance marked by the judging panel, and will progress to the next round.

Indicates the contestant has been allowed to progress to the next round by the judging panel.

Indicates the contestant was placed in danger zone and has been allowed to progress to the next round by the judging panel.

=== Endrendrum Captain – (episodes 12 and 13) ===
This round was specifically dedicated to actor Vijayakanth, who has passed away on the 28th December 2023.

Name of the Performer(s)	Name of Song	Lyricist	Name of Film/Album	Singer(s)	Composer(s)	Round Status
Na. Veeramani	Nee Pottu Vacha	Gangai Amaran	Ponmana Selvan (1989 film)	Malaysia Vasudevan, Mano, K. S. Chithra	Ilaiyaraaja	PROGRESS TO NEXT ROUND
E. Kalidhasan	Nee Pottu Vacha	Gangai Amaran	Ponmana Selvan (1989 film)	Malaysia Vasudevan, Mano, K. S. Chithra	Ilaiyaraaja	PROGRESS TO NEXT ROUND
Daisey Yensone (Daisey)	Yedho Ninaivugal	Gangai Amaran	Agal Vilakku (1970 film)	K. J. Yesudas, S. P. Sailaja	Ilaiyaraaja	GOLDEN PERFORMER SAFE AND PROGRESS TO NEXT ROUND
N.R.K Arun	Yedho Ninaivugal	Gangai Amaran	Agal Vilakku (1970 film)	K. J. Yesudas, S. P. Sailaja	Ilaiyaraaja	GOLDEN PERFORMER SAFE AND PROGRESS TO NEXT ROUND
P. Lincy Diana	Aadiyile Sedhi	Kalidasan	En Aasai Machan (1994 film)	K. S. Chithra	Deva	PROGRESS TO NEXT ROUND
Thanseera Jahan	Thannane Thamarapoo	Vasan	Periyanna (1999 film)	S. P. Balasubrahmanyam, K. S. Chithra	Bharani	GOLDEN PERFORMER SAFE AND PROGRESS TO NEXT ROUND
Sanjiv Raju	Thannane Thamarapoo	Vasan	Periyanna (1999 film)	S. P. Balasubrahmanyam, K. S. Chithra	Bharani	GOLDEN PERFORMER SAFE AND PROGRESS TO NEXT ROUND
Aishwerya Radhakrishnan	Karuppu Nila	Vaali	En Aasai Machan (1994 film)	K. S. Chithra	Deva	PROGRESS TO NEXT ROUND
John Jerome	Muthumani Maala	R. V. Udayakumar	Chinna Gounder (1992 film)	S. P. Balasubrahmanyam, P. Susheela	Ilaiyaraaja	GOLDEN PERFORMER SAFE AND PROGRESS TO NEXT ROUND
Srinidhi Sriprakash (Srinidhi)	Muthumani Maala	R. V. Udayakumar	Chinna Gounder (1992 film)	S. P. Balasubrahmanyam, P. Susheela	Ilaiyaraaja	GOLDEN PERFORMER SAFE AND PROGRESS TO NEXT ROUND
Vaishnavi Kovvuri (Vaishnavi)	Mayanginen Solla Thayanginen	Vaali	Naane Raja Naane Mandhiri (1985 film)	P. Jayachandran, P. Susheela	Ilaiyaraaja	GOLDEN PERFORMER SAFE AND PROGRESS TO NEXT ROUND
Shriyaa Vishnuram	Paasamulla Paandiyare	Gangai Amaran	Captain Prabhakaran (1991 film)	Mano, K. S. Chithra	Ilaiyaraaja	GOLDEN PERFORMER SAFE AND PROGRESS TO NEXT ROUND
Sreenidhi Ramakrishnan	Paasamulla Paandiyare	Gangai Amaran	Captain Prabhakaran (1991 film)	Mano, K. S. Chithra	Ilaiyaraaja	GOLDEN PERFORMER SAFE AND PROGRESS TO NEXT ROUND
Shruthi Shekar	Vidala Pulla	Muthulingam	Periya Marudhu (1994 film)	Swarnalatha	Ilaiyaraaja	PROGRESS TO NEXT ROUND
Padmaja Srinivasan	Thanthana Thanthana Thaimasam	Pa. Vijay	Thavasi (2001 film)	K. J. Yesudas, Sadhana Sargam	Vidyasagar	PROGRESS TO NEXT ROUND
Vikram Pitty	Thanthana Thanthana Thaimasam	Pa. Vijay	Thavasi (2001 film)	K. J. Yesudas, Sadhana Sargam	Vidyasagar	PROGRESS TO NEXT ROUND
Anagai Settu (Gana Setu)	Ayya Ayya Captain Ayya	Anagai Settu (Gana Setu)	Anagai Settu (Gana Setu)	Anagai Settu (Gana Setu)	Anagai Settu (Gana Setu)	GOLDEN PERFORMER SAFE AND PROGRESS TO NEXT ROUND
Jeevitha Pannerselvam	Enna Nenache	R. V. Udayakumar	Chokka Thangam (2003 film)	P. Unnikrishnan, Anuradha Sriram	Deva	GOLDEN PERFORMER SAFE AND PROGRESS TO NEXT ROUND
Vignesh Raju	Enna Nenache	R. V. Udayakumar	Chokka Thangam (2003 film)	P. Unnikrishnan, Anuradha Sriram	Deva	GOLDEN PERFORMER SAFE AND PROGRESS TO NEXT ROUND

Indicates the contestant has not achieved a golden performance for the round because of their insufficient performance level marked by the judges.

Indicates the contestant has been eliminated due to inadequate performance marked by the judges.

Indicates the contestant has been given a golden performance shower for their sufficient performance marked by the judging panel, and will progress to the next round.

Indicates the contestant has been allowed to progress to the next round by the judging panel.

Indicates the contestant was placed in danger zone and has been allowed to progress to the next round by the judging panel.

=== Wedding hits – (episodes 14 and 15) ===
Name of the Performer(s)	Name of Song	Lyricist	Name of Film/Album	Singer(s)	Composer(s)	Round Status
Shriyaa Vishnuram	Per Vechalum Vekkama Ponnalum	Vaali	Michael Madana Kama Rajan (1990 film) -version 1 Dikkiloona (2021 film) – version 2	Malaysia Vasudevan, S. Janaki	Ilaiyaraaja (version 1); Yuvan Shankar Raja (version 2)	ELIMINATED
Na. Veeramani	Per Vechalum Vekkama Ponnalum	Vaali	Michael Madana Kama Rajan (1990 film) -version 1 Dikkiloona (2021 film) – version 2	Malaysia Vasudevan, S. Janaki	Ilaiyaraaja (version 1); Yuvan Shankar Raja (version 2)	ELIMINATED
Vikram Pitty	Anantham Anantham	Palani Bharathi	Poove Unakkaga (1996 film)	P. Unnikrishnan (version 1); K. S. Chithra (version 2)	S. A. Rajkumar	GOLDEN PERFORMER SAFE AND PROGRESS TO NEXT ROUND
E. Kalidhasan	Azhagae Azhagae Azhagae	E. Kalidhasan	E. Kalidhasan	E. Kalidhasan	E. Kalidhasan	PROGRESS TO NEXT ROUND
Shruthi Shekar	Nenjinile Nenjinile	Vairamuthu	Dil Se/Uyire (1998 film)	S. Janaki, M. G. Sreekumar	A. R. Rahman	GOLDEN PERFORMER SAFE AND PROGRESS TO NEXT ROUND
Srinidhi Sriprakash (Srinidhi)	Ragasiyamai	Na. Muthukumar	Dumm Dumm Dumm (2001 film)	Sadhana Sargam, Hariharan, Ramanathan	Karthik Raja	PROGRESS TO NEXT ROUND
John Jerome	Oru Naalum	Vaali	Yajaman (1993 film)	S. P. Balasubrahmanyam, S. Janaki	Ilaiyaraaja	PROGRESS TO NEXT ROUND
Jeevitha Pannerselvam	Oru Naalum	Vaali	Yajaman (1993 film)	S. P. Balasubrahmanyam, S. Janaki	Ilaiyaraaja	PROGRESS TO NEXT ROUND
P. Lincy Diana	Kummi Adi	Vaali	Sillunu Oru Kaadhal (2006 film)	Sirkazhi G. Sivachidambaram, Naresh Iyer, Chorus, Theni Kunjarammal, Swarnalatha	A. R. Rahman	GOLDEN PERFORMER SAFE AND PROGRESS TO NEXT ROUND
Padmaja Srinivasan	Vennilavae Vennilavae Vetkam	Palani Bharathi	Kaalamellam Kadhal Vaazhga (1997 film)	S. P. Balasubrahmanyam, Swarnalatha	Deva	PROGRESS TO NEXT ROUND
Sanjiv Raju	Vennilavae Vennilavae Vetkam	Palani Bharathi	Kaalamellam Kadhal Vaazhga (1997 film)	S. P. Balasubrahmanyam, Swarnalatha	Deva	PROGRESS TO NEXT ROUND
N.R.K Arun	Mathadu Mathadu	Palani Bharathi	Arunachalam (1997 film)	S. P. Balasubrahmanyam, Sujatha Mohan, Manorama, Meera	Deva	DANGER ZONE – PROGRESS TO NEXT ROUND
Aishwerya Radhakrishnan	Mathadu Mathadu	Palani Bharathi	Arunachalam (1997 film)	S. P. Balasubrahmanyam, Sujatha Mohan, Manorama, Meera	Deva	ELIMINATED
Anagai Settu (Gana Setu)	Aathangara Orathil	Kabilan	Yaan (2014 film)	Gana Bala, M. C. Vickey	Harris Jayaraj	GOLDEN PERFORMER SAFE AND PROGRESS TO NEXT ROUND
Vaishnavi Kovvuri (Vaishnavi)	Yaro Yarodi	Vairamuthu	Alai Payuthey (2000 film)	Mahalakshmi Iyer, Vaishali Samant, Richa Sharma	A. R. Rahman	GOLDEN PERFORMER SAFE AND PROGRESS TO NEXT ROUND
Sreenidhi Ramakrishnan	Yaro Yarodi	Vairamuthu	Alai Payuthey (2000 film)	Mahalakshmi Iyer, Vaishali Samant, Richa Sharma	A. R. Rahman	GOLDEN PERFORMER SAFE AND PROGRESS TO NEXT ROUND
Daisey Yensone (Daisey)	Sundhari Neeyum Sundharan Njanum	Poovachal Khader, Panchu Arunachalam	Michael Madana Kama Rajan (1990 film)	Kamal Haasan, S. Janaki	Ilaiyaraaja	GOLDEN PERFORMER SAFE AND PROGRESS TO NEXT ROUND
Vignesh Raju	Sundhari Neeyum Sundharan Njanum	Poovachal Khader, Panchu Arunachalam	Michael Madana Kama Rajan (1990 film)	Kamal Haasan, S. Janaki	Ilaiyaraaja	GOLDEN PERFORMER SAFE AND PROGRESS TO NEXT ROUND
Thanseera Jahan	Ottagathai Kattiko	Vairamuthu	Gentleman (1993 film)	S. P. Balasubrahmanyam, S. Janaki, Sujatha Mohan, Minmini	A. R. Rahman	GOLDEN PERFORMER SAFE AND PROGRESS TO NEXT ROUND

Indicates the contestant has not achieved a golden performance for the round because of their insufficient performance level marked by the judges.

Indicates the contestant has been eliminated due to inadequate performance marked by the judges.

Indicates the contestant has been given a golden performance shower for their sufficient performance marked by the judging panel, and will progress to the next round.

Indicates the contestant has been allowed to progress to the next round by the judging panel.

Indicates the contestant was placed in danger zone and has been allowed to progress to the next round by the judging panel.

=== Bhakthi Thiruvizha round – (episodes 16 and 17) ===
Name of the Performer(s)	Name of Song	Lyricist	Name of Film/Album	Singer(s)	Composer(s)	Round Status
Vikram Pitty	Vinayagane Vinay Theerpavane			Sirkazhi Govindarajan		DANGER ZONE – PROGRESS TO NEXT ROUND
Jeevitha Pannerselvam	Palayathamma Nee	Kalidasan	Palayathu Amman	K. S. Chithra	S. A. Rajkumar	PROGRESS TO NEXT ROUND
Padmaja Srinivasan	Palayathamma Nee	Kalidasan	Palayathu Amman	K. S. Chithra	S. A. Rajkumar	DANGER ZONE – PROGRESS TO NEXT ROUND
Daisey Yensone	Thirupparang Kundrathil Nee Sirithal Muruga	Poovai Senguttuvan	Kandhan Karunai	P. Susheela, Soolamangalam Sisters (Rajalakshmi)	K. V. Mahadevan	GOLDEN PERFORMER SAFE AND PROGRESS TO NEXT ROUND
Srinidhi Sriprakash	Thaka Thaka Thakavena Aadava		Karaikkal Ammaiyar	K. B. Sundarambal	Kunnakudi Vaidyanathan	GOLDEN PERFORMER SAFE AND PROGRESS TO NEXT ROUND
Shruthi Shekar	Thaka Thaka Thakavena Aadava		Karaikkal Ammaiyar	K. B. Sundarambal	Kunnakudi Vaidyanathan	DANGER ZONE – PROGRESS TO NEXT ROUND
Thanseera Jahan	Puthukottai Bhuvaneswari	Kalidasan	Rajakali Amman	K. S. Chithra	S. A. Rajkumar	PROGRESS TO NEXT ROUND
John Jerome	Irumudi Kattu	Veeramani Raju		Veeramani Raju		DANGER ZONE – PROGRESS TO NEXT ROUND
Anagai Settu (Gana Setu)						PROGRESS TO NEXT ROUND
Sanjiv Raju	Bhagavan Saranam	Veeramani Raju	Pallikkattu Tamil	Veeramani Raju		PROGRESS TO NEXT ROUND
Vaishnavi Kovvuri (Vaishnavi)	Oru Thali Varam Kettu Vanthen	Kalidasan	Purusha Lakshanam	K. S. Chithra	Deva	GOLDEN PERFORMER SAFE AND PROGRESS TO NEXT ROUND
N.R.K Arun	Mannaalum			T. M. Soundararajan	T. M. Soundararajan	GOLDEN PERFORMER SAFE AND PROGRESS TO NEXT ROUND
E. Kalidhasan	Ponmagale Deviyamma		Sevappu Selaikari	Pudhukai Manimaran	Kanmani Raja Mohammad	GOLDEN PERFORMER SAFE AND PROGRESS TO NEXT ROUND
Vignesh Raju	Om Sivoham	Vaali	Naan Kadavul	Vijay Prakash	Ilaiyaraaja	GOLDEN PERFORMER SAFE AND PROGRESS TO NEXT ROUND
Sreenidhi Ramakrishnan	Mariamma Engal Mariamma	Geetha Priyan	Thaaye Karumaarai	L. R. Eswari	Kunnakudi Vaidyanathan	GOLDEN PERFORMER SAFE AND PROGRESS TO NEXT ROUND
P. Lincy Diana	Vanam Boomi Idi Muzhanga		Devakottai Abirami		Jerson	GOLDEN PERFORMER SAFE AND PROGRESS TO NEXT ROUND

Indicates the contestant has not achieved a golden performance for the round because of their insufficient performance level marked by the judges.

Indicates the contestant has been eliminated due to inadequate performance marked by the judges.

Indicates the contestant has been given a golden performance shower for their sufficient performance marked by the judging panel, and will progress to the next round.

Indicates the contestant has been allowed to progress to the next round by the judging panel.

Indicates the contestant was placed in danger zone and has been allowed to progress to the next round by the judging panel.

=== Kadhal hits (episodes 18 and 19) ===
Name of the performer(s)	Name of song	Lyricist	Name of film/album	Singer(s)	Composer(s)	Round status
Ajesh Ashok	Aasai Aasai	Kabilan	Dhool	Shankar Mahadevan, Sujatha Mohan	Vidyasagar	Eliminated
Padmaja Srinivasan	Aasai Aasai	Kabilan	Dhool	Shankar Mahadevan, Sujatha Mohan	Vidyasagar	Eliminated
Rakshita Suresh	Enakke Enakka	Vairamuthu	Jeans	P. Unnikrishnan, S.P. B. Pallavi	A. R. Rahman	Golden Performer - progress to next round
N.R.K Arun	Enakke Enakka	Vairamuthu	Jeans	P. Unnikrishnan, S.P. B. Pallavi	A. R. Rahman	Golden Performer - progress to next round
E. Kalidhasan	Adivellakkaara Velaayi	Mahalingham	Kadaikutty Singam	Anthony Daasan	D. Imman	Eliminated
Vaishnavi Kovvuri	Maya Nadhi	Umadevi	Kabali	Ananthu, Pradeep Kumar, Shweta Mohan	Santhosh Narayanan	Progress to next round
Srinidhi Sriprakash	Swasame	Pa. Vijay	Thenali	S. P. Balasubrahmanyam, Sadhana Sargam	A. R. Rahman	Golden Performer - progress to next round
Sathyaprakash	Swasame	Pa. Vijay	Thenali	S. P. Balasubrahmanyam, Sadhana Sargam	A. R. Rahman	Golden Performer - progress to next round
Abliash	Malare Mounama ( Carnatic raga: Dabari Kanada )	Vairamuthu	Karnaa	S. P. Balasubrahmanyam, S. Janaki	Vidyasagar	Danger zone - progress to next round
P. Lincy Diana	Malare Mounama ( Carnatic raga: Dabari Kanada )	Vairamuthu	Karnaa	S. P. Balasubrahmanyam, S. Janaki	Vidyasagar	Danger zone - progress to next round
Vignesh Raju	Kaatre En Vasal ( Carnatic raga: Dabari Kanada )	Vairamuthu	Rhythm	P. Unnikrishnan, Kavita Krishnamurti	A. R. Rahman	Golden Performer - progress to next round
Sridhar Sena	Yaaro Yaarukkul Ingu Yaaro (Love Theme)	Vaali	Chennai 600028	S. P. Balasubrahmanyam, K. S. Chithra	Yuvan Shankar Raja	Golden Performer - progress to next round
Sreendihi Ramakrishnan	Yaaro Yaarukkul Ingu Yaaro (Love Theme)	Vaali	Chennai 600028	S. P. Balasubrahmanyam, K. S. Chithra	Yuvan Shankar Raja	Golden Performer - progress to next round
Vikram Pitty	Pookal Pookum Tharunam	Na. Muthukumar	Madrasapattinam	Roopkumar Rathod, Harini, Andrea Jeremiah, G. V. Prakash Kumar	G. V. Prakash Kumar	Progress to next round
Thanseera Jahan	Pookal Pookum Tharunam	Na. Muthukumar	Madrasapattinam	Roopkumar Rathod, Harini, Andrea Jeremiah, G. V. Prakash Kumar	G. V. Prakash Kumar	Danger zone - progress to next round
Srinisha Jayaseelan	Enakoru Snegidhi	Vaali	Priyamaanavale	Hariharan, Mahalakshmi Iyer	S. A. Rajkumar	Danger zone - progress to next round
Sanjiv Raju	Enakoru Snegidhi	Vaali	Priyamaanavale	Hariharan, Mahalakshmi Iyer	S. A. Rajkumar	Danger zone - progress to next round
Sam Vishal	Kadhal Ara Onnu Vizundhuchu	Muthamil	Vaayai Moodi Pesavum	Sean Roldan, Shakthisree Gopalan	Sean Roldan	Golden Performer - progress to next round
Shruthi Shekar	Kadhal Ara Onnu Vizundhuchu	Muthamil	Vaayai Moodi Pesavum	Sean Roldan, Shakthisree Gopalan	Sean Roldan	Golden Performer - progress to next round
Sreekanth Hariharan	Sundari Kannal	Vaali	Thalapathi	S. P. Balasubrahmanyam, S. Janaki	Ilaiyaraaja	Progress to next round
Jeevitha Pannerselvam	Sundari Kannal	Vaali	Thalapathi	S. P. Balasubrahmanyam, S. Janaki	Ilaiyaraaja	Progress to next round
Daisy Yenone	Pudhu Vellai Mazhai	Vairamuthu	Roja	Unni Menon, Sujatha Mohan	A. R. Rahman	Golden Performer - progress to next round
John Jerome	Pudhu Vellai Mazhai	Vairamuthu	Roja	Unni Menon, Sujatha Mohan	A. R. Rahman	Golden Performer - progress to next round
Anagai Settu (Gana Setu)	Aadi Pona Aavani	Kabilan	Attakathi	Gana Bala	Santhosh Narayanan	Golden Performer - progress to next round

Indicates the contestant has not achieved a golden performance for the round because of their insufficient performance level marked by the judges.

Indicates the contestant has been eliminated due to inadequate performance marked by the judges.

Indicates the contestant has been given a golden performance shower for their sufficient performance marked by the judging panel, and will progress to the next round.

Indicates the contestant has been allowed to progress to the next round by the judging panel.

Indicates the contestant was placed in danger zone and has been allowed to progress to the next round by the judging panel.

=== Thala Thalapathy hits (episodes 20 and 21) ===
Name of the performer(s)	Name of song	Lyricist	Name of film/album	Singer(s)	Composer(s)	Round atatus
Shruthi Shekar	Ellappugazhum	Vaali	Azhagiya Tamil Magan	A. R. Rahman	A. R. Rahman	Golden Performer - progress to next round
Sanjiv Raju	Thalaattum Kaatre	Vairamuthu	Poovellam Un Vaasam	Shankar Mahadevan	Vidyasagar	Progress to next round
Vaishnavi Kovvuri (Vaishnavi)	Ennai Thalaata	Palani Bharathi	Kadhalukku Mariyadhai	Bhavatharini, Hariharan	Ilaiyaraaja	Golden Performer - progress to next round
Anagai Settu (Gana Setu)	Aaluma Doluma	Rokesh	Vedalam	Anirudh Ravichander, Badshah	Anirudh Ravichander	Progress to next round
John Jerome	Mellinamae Mellinamae	Vairamuthu	Shahjahan	Harish Raghavendra	Mani Sharma	Golden Performer - progress to next round
P. Lincy Diana	Vathikuchi Pathikadhuda	Vaali	Dheena	S. P. Balasubrahmanyam	Yuvan Shankar Raja	Progress to next round
Thanseera Jahan	Mottu Onru	Vairamuthu	Kushi	Hariharan, Sadhana Sargam	Deva	Progress to next round
Sreenidhi Ramakrishnan	Unnai Paartha	Vairamuthu	Kaadhal Mannan	S. P. Balasubrahmanyam	Bharadwaj	Golden Performer - progress to next round
N.R.K. Arun	Innisai Paadivarum	Vairamuthu	Thullatha Manamum Thullum	P. Unnikrishnan (version 1) K. S. Chithra (version 2)	S. A. Rajkumar	Progress to next round
Srinidhi Sriprakash	Ding Dong Koyil Mani	Pa. Vijay	Ji	Madhu Balakrishnan, Madhushree	Vidyasagar	Golden Performer - progress to next round
Vikram Pitty	Neeyaa Pesiyadhu	Yugabharathi	Thirumalai	Shankar Mahadevan	Vidyasagar	Progress to next round
Daisey Yensone	Akkam Pakkam	Na. Muthukumar	Kireedam	Sadhana Sargam	G. V. Prakash Kumar	Golden Performer - progress to next round
Jeevitha Pannerselvam	Elantha Pazham	Pa. Vijay	Madhurey	Tippu, Anuradha Sriram	Vidyasagar	Golden Performer - progress to next round
Vignesh Raju	Kannaana Kanney	Thamarai	Viswasam	Sid Sriram	D. Imman	Golden Performer - progress to next round

=== Rockstar Mano 40 (episodes 22 and 23) ===
Name of the performer(s)	Name of song	Lyricist	Name of film/album	Singer(s)	Composer(s)	Round atatus
Vaishnavi Kovvuri	Mukkala Mukkabla	Vaali	Kadhalan	Mano	A. R. Rahman	Golden Performer - progress to next round
N.R.K Arun	Kannum Kannum	Vairamuthu	Thiruda Thiruda	Mano	A. R. Rahman	
Vikram Pitty	Azhagiya Laila	Palani Bharathi	Ullathai Allitha	Mano	Sirpy	

== Production ==
=== Release ===
The first promo, featuring playback singer Roshini and her song 'Tum Tum' from the movie 'Enemy,' was released on 22 March 2023. She participated as a contestant during Super Singer Season 7. The second promo, released on 1 December 2023, featured singer D . Sathyaprakash and his song Aalaporaan Thamizhan from the movie 'Mersal.' D. Sathyaprakash was a contestant during Super Singer Season 3.

The third promo, released on 3 December 2023, featured singers Senthil Ganesh and Rajalakshmi, and their song 'Chinna Machan' from the movie 'Charlie Chaplin 2.' They were both contestants during Super Singer Season 6. The fourth promo, featuring singer Anu Anand and her song Onakkaga Poranthaenae from the movie 'Pannaiyarum Padminiyum,' was released on 6 December 2023. She participated as a contestant during Super Singer Season 8.

The first launching promo was unveiled on 10 December 2023, revealing the release date.
