= Malkar Mohamed =

- Born: 21 November 1943
- Died: February 26, 1996 (aged 52)
- Occupations: film producer businessman
- Known for: film producer of Komaligal

Malkar Mohamed (born 21 November 1943 – 26 February 1996) born in Colombo, Sri Lanka, was a film producer of the Sri Lankan Tamil film industry and a businessman.

== Career ==
He was the producer of the great commercial success in Tamil film of Sri Lanka, "Komaligal" (Clowns). This was the remake of the popular radio comedy drama, "Komaligalin Kummalam".

== Hobbies ==
Mohamed was a businessman and used to listen to this radio drama. He was attracted by the storyline and thought to make it as a film.

== Productions ==
The highlight of the film was the performances of Ramadas, a Brahmin in real life, who played the role of a Muslim, and B. H. Abdul Hameed, a Muslim in real life, who played a Brahmin role. The film was most successful in the Box Office rather than previous Sri Lankan Tamil films.
