= Komaligal =

- Directed by: S. Ramanathan
- Written by: S. Ramdas
- Produced by: M. Mohamed
- Starring: S. Ramdas; B. H. Abdul Hameed
- Cinematography: John J. Yogarajah
- Edited by: S. Ramanathan
- Music by: Kannan - Nesam
- Production company: S. P. M Movies
- Release date: 22 October 1976
- Running time: 125 minutes
- Country: Sri Lanka
- Language: Tamil

Komaligal (Tamil: கோமாளிகள், "The Clowns") is a 1976 Sri Lankan Tamil language film written by S.Ramdas and produced by M.Mohamed. This was the remake of the most popular radio comedy drama, Komalihalin Kummalam which was broadcast on Radio Ceylon in the mid 1970s. It was written by S. Ramdas who acted in lead role.

== Cast ==
- Marikkar S. Ramdas as a Muslim
- T. Rajagopal as Appukutty
- B. H. Abdul Hameed as a Brahmin
- S. Selvasekaran as Upali
- K. Chandrasekaran
- K. A. Jawahir (Aboo Nana) as Thanikasalam
- S. M. Mustafa
- S. Jesurathnam
- R. Kasinathan
- K. A. Dheekshan
- Sillaiyur Selvarajan as a lover
- Kamalini Selvarajan as a lover

== Production ==
M. Mohamed, a businessman, who used to listen this radio drama weekly, was attracted by it. Thus he thought to make it as a film. He expressed his idea to S.Ramdas. He also agreed and film was started. Story and dialogues were written by S.Ramdas who acted as Marikkar in lead role. Film was directed by Ramanathan, an experienced person in the Sinhala film industry. Marikkar S. Ramdas, a Hindu Brahmin in real life, portrayed a Muslim. B. H. Abdul Hameed, a Muslim in real life, portrayed a Hindu Brahmin. Sillaiyur Selvarajan and Kamalini Selvarajan, who were married in real life, portray lovers in the film.

== Soundtrack ==
- Music - Kannan Nesam
- Lyrics - Sillaiyur Selvarajan, Fouzul Ameer and Saathu
- Playback singers - Muthazhagu, Kalavathi, Sujatha and S.Ramdas

== Box office ==
Komaligal was produced in 45 days. On 22 November 1976 the film was screened in 6 places. Film was very successful in box office rather than previous Sri Lankan Tamil movies. Komaligal was running in Central Colombo (Sellamahal) 76 days, in South Colombo (Plaza) 55 days, in Jaffna 51 days, in Trincomalee 33 days and Batticolao 32 days. As per Dominic Jeeva, author of Malligai magazine, "Viewers returned from Theatre without seeing the movie since it was houseful."

The financial success of Komaligal gave the belief to other producers that they could produce successful Tamil cinema in Sri Lanka.

== Sources ==
- Ilankai Thamil Cinemavin Kathai, Thambyayah Thevathas
- http://www.noolaham.net/project/04/379/379.htm
- Jeyaraj, D. B. S. (25 June 2012). "For a distinct identity". The Hindu. Archived from the original on 25 June 2002.
- "Komaligal (1976) Srilankan Tamil Movie". You Tube. Chennai, India. 16 September 2020. Archived from the original on 21 December 2021.
