= Suryodayam =

- Directed by: L. V. Aadhavan
- Written by: L. V. Pradarsh
- Produced by: Kiran Jhunjhunwala
- Starring: Vijayashanti; Rahman
- Cinematography: Felix Rai
- Edited by: M. R. Lee; G. T. Selvam
- Music by: Gnani
- Production company: L. V. Brothers
- Release date: 7 October 1999
- Running time: 120 minutes
- Country: India
- Language: Tamil

Suryodayam (transl. Sunrise) is a 1999 Indian Tamil-language action film directed by L. V. Aadhavan. The film stars Vijayashanti and Rahman, with Vijayakumar, Anusha, Nizhalgal Ravi, Viswajith, Hariraj, Charle, and Kumaresan playing supporting roles. It was released on 7 October 1999.Suryodayam

== Plot ==
Bala is a singer in a musical ensemble with his friends Ajith, Ajith's girlfriend Amritha, Nambi, and Wilson. They are not popular enough to get decent assignments. One day, they get the opportunity to sing for a grand function and they have an outstanding performance there. The famous Indian concert organizer J. R. appreciates their performance and gives them an opportunity to perform in Sri Lanka.

In the meantime, many cities of India experience terrorist incidents. The terrorists used remote-controlled cars "detonator" to commit those attacks. The CBI officer Indra is charged to dismantle the terrorist group. She finally captures Dawood, the leader of the terrorist group. However, he later manages to escape from jail and lands in Takistan, a dangerous and corrupt country.

J. R. has also another face: he is an international arms dealer and sells weapons to terrorists. J. R. with Kannan and his friends move to Takistan to perform in a concert. There, J. R. meets the terrorist Dawood, who is sought by the CBI. J. R. thinks that Dawood's presence may lure the CBI so J. R.'s partner Malik, a Takistan's secret agent, killed Dawood. J. R. then plans to kill the Indian scientist Kaladharan who is on the brink of finding a solution to disable the remote-controlled cars. When Bala learns of the matter, he immediately informs his friends by phone, but J. R. sees him, and his henchmen brutally murder Bala. Ajith, Nambi, and Wilson seek justice for their late friend Bala. They inform Indra about J. R.'s illegal activities. What transpires next forms the rest of the story.

== Cast ==
- Vijayashanti as Indra
- Rahman as Bala
- Vijayakumar as J. R.
- Anusha as Amritha
- Nizhalgal Ravi as Kaladharan
- Viswajith as Dawood
- Hariraj as Ajith
- Charle as Nambi
- Kumaresan as Wilson
- Prathapachandran as Chief Minister
- Bakhtiyar as Malik
- Kumarimuthu
- Peketi Sivaram
- Sabeetha Perera
- Jaguar Thangam as Vikram
- Delhi Kannan
- Pandurangam
- Ulmas
- Habiba
- Weerasinghe Ranatunga
- Sanuja Bibili
- B. H. Abdul Hameed as himself

== Production ==
The film began production in 1994 under the title Isai Payanam (transl. Musical journey) and featured Rahman, Anusha and Sri Lankan actress Sabeetha Perera. Vijayashanti joined the cast later on, and the film was retitled to Suryodayam. The film was extensively shot across Uzbekistan and Sri Lanka, as well as India. It became the first Indian film to be shot in Uzbekistan. After seventy five percent of the shoot was over, Athavan was replaced as director by Pandiyan Arivali, who had earlier made Avathara Purushan (1996). He removed twenty five percent of the shot scenes, and completed the film thereafter.

== Soundtrack ==
The soundtrack was composed by Gnani, with lyrics written by Kovi Kannan.

Song	Singer(s)	Duration
"Idho Inga Isai"	Mano, Chorus	5:18
"Kaadhal Oru Poonthottam"	Mano, Lapson Rajkumar, K. S. Chithra	2:48
"Poo Medhai"	S. P. Balasubrahmanyam, Swarnalatha	4:34
"Anbu Arasala Vendum"	Mano, Lapson Rajkumar, K. S. Chithra, Swarnalatha	3:25

== Release and reception ==
Suryodayam was released on 7 October 1999. D. S. Ramanujam of The Hindu appreciated the stunt sequences and cinematography, but felt the screenplay lacked "cogency" and also criticised the comedy subplot.

In October 1999, the film was dubbed and released in Telugu as Desam Kosam by producer Maddi Narayana under the Sri Krishnarjuna Films banner.Cricbet99
