= Rocketry: The Nambi Effect (soundtrack) =

2022 film soundtrack album

- Soundtrack album cover

Soundtrack album by Sam C. S., Billy Dawson and Nate Cornell
- Released: 24 June 2022
- Recorded: 2021–2022
- Genre: Feature film soundtrack
- Length: 59:59
- Languages: English; Tamil; Hindi
- Label: Tricolour Films

Sam C. S. chronology
| Saani Kaayidham (2022) | Rocketry: The Nambi Effect (2022) | Ramarao on Duty (2022) |
External audio
- Rocketry - Full Album on YouTube

Singles from Rocketry: The Nambi Effect
- 1. "Rocketry's Sri Venkateswara Suprabhatam" Released: 17 June 2022

Rocketry: The Nambi Effect is the soundtrack to the 2022 film of the same name written, directed and co-produced by R. Madhavan, which is based on the life of Nambi Narayanan, former scientist and aerospace engineer of the Indian Space Research Organisation, who was falsely accused of espionage. The original score for the film is composed by Sam C. S.

The soundtrack to Rocketry featured nine tracks; two original songs composed by Tennessee-based country musicians Billy Dawson and Nate Cornell, a rendition of the devotional track "Sri Venkateswara Suprabatham", arranged and produced by Divakar Subramaniam and Sam's original score accompanying the remainder of it. The scoring was done for nearly two years since 2019 and was recorded at Los Angeles. Due to the setting of the film, in various continents, Sam wanted the score to be "completely westernised", though it had an Indian ethnicity. The songs which are appearing in the film as montages, were recorded by the composers themselves, for the English versions, while Aditya Rao rendered those tracks in the Indian languages.

The Suprabhatam track was released on 17 June 2022, during the promotions of the film at Sri Venkateswara Temple in Tirupati, while the soundtrack was released on 24 June. The songs and background score received positive critical response.

== Production ==
In April 2019, Madhavan announced that Sam C. S. would compose the score for Rocketry: The Nambi Effect; he previously scored for Vikram Vedha (2017), which also starred Madhavan in the lead. Upon Sam's inclusion, Madhavan stated that "he could provide character building with respect to the film's background score, which he demanded, especially for a biopic about Nambi Narayanan". Sam said that the "overall music of the film needed a western color, as it is an English film, and while it had an Indian ethnic feel, it also needed a westernised orchestral score", as the film was predominantly shot in foreign countries. He also stated that, as the film takes places from the 1980s to the 2000s, the score will also "have a touch to the music of those time periods". The score was recorded much before the films shooting, and Madhavan felt it easier to place those songs to see the effectiveness of it.

Sam worked with the Macedonian Symphonic Orchestra during October 2020 for recording the live orchestral music. Despite the pandemic restrictions, the orchestration team led by Michael Hyman and sound engineer Jim Satya, arranged a 72-piece orchestra for the film. To achieve the westernized feel of the music, Sam had blended rock and contemporary music into the orchestra. The orchestral sessions took place at the Los Angeles. In an interview to The New Indian Express critic Chandini S, Sam had said that fitting the film's music to the setting (as it takes place in various continents) was a challenge in itself. He added "There were a few sequences set in Russia at the time when it was still the USSR (Soviet Union). So, we did a bit of research and found the national anthem of that period. We have recreated it for the establishment scene. Likewise, for scenes set in France, we found popular songs of that period and recreated them." Sam added the film will have original songs in the background, which will be played in a car or on a radio, as similar to that of Hollywood films.

"For lot of South Indians, Suprabhatam is the first tune that they hear early in the morning, and is a sacred hymn to the lord, to thank him for his generosity and to urge him to take care of us. And, me being a South Indian that was something that I grew up with, I somehow always felt that I need a more loving loving version to the Suprabhatam."

— R. Madhavan, on the usage of the devotional track Suprabhatam.

The first song to be recorded, was the rendition of the Sanskrit poem Suprabhatam featured in the film. It was arranged and produced by Divakar Subramaniam, who attributed the song to be soft and gentle, like "awakening the lord" and a nascent and pure version from the heart. Subramaniam went to several temples around Chennai and Tirupati, and had met several religious scholars as a part of his research. Madhavan stated that, the Suprabhatam is played in the beginning of the film, where "beyond from the universe there is an absolute emptiness, and the only existing thing is the supreme being and from there, the universe slowly converges to the planet earth, and then it showcases into Nambi Narayanan's house and his altar where he is seen praying". It is to show that, "there is a universe that is oblivious to what is happening on earth, but the universe of Narayanan, on that day, is going to get completely destroyed". And he felt auspicious to begin with that, to feel a positive impact before the "devastation happens and hits him [Narayanan] harder".

The film has two original songs, featured in the film: "And It Hurts" and "Through Thick and Thin". Nate Cornell and Billy Dawson, country musicians hailing from Tennessee, composed and also sang the respective tracks. Cornell co-wrote the lyrics for the former, with Terell Davy, whereas Dawson wrote "Through Thick and Thin" through WhatsApp text message with Madhavan; they intended to not have linguistic barriers between "a Texan and an Indian", as a result, both the songs were recorded in six different languages.

== Release ==
On 17 June 2022, as a part of the film's promotions, Madhavan, the co-producer Vijay Moolan, along with composer Divakar Subramaniam went to Sri Venkateswara Temple in Tirupati, to release behind-the-scenes video of the film's music as well as the release of the "Sri Venkateshwara Suprabhatam". On 24 June, the film's music album was released in Tamil, and Hindi languages, featuring the two songs and instrumentals composed by Sam C. S.

== Track listing ==
English
| No. | Title | Lyrics | Music | Singer(s) | Length |
|---|---|---|---|---|---|
| 1. | "Rocketry Sri Venkatesha Suprabhatam" | Traditional | Divakar Subramaniam | Vignesh G, Sai Vignesh, Venkataramanan L, Nikhil Shankar, Vikram Pitty | 27:38 |
| 2. | "Cry of Venus" | - | Sam C. S. | Instrumental | 2:49 |
| 3. | "And It Hurts" | Nate Cornell, Terell Davy | Nate Cornell | Nate Cornell | 4:04 |
| 4. | "Celestial Dance" | - | Sam C. S. | Instrumental | 4:50 |
| 5. | "Through Thick and Thin" | Billy Dawson, R. Madhavan | Billy Dawson | Billy Dawson | 3:45 |
| 6. | "Monarchs" | - | Sam C. S. | Instrumental | 5:01 |
| 7. | "Ranging Rivers" | - | Sam C. S. | Instrumental | 2:49 |
| 8. | "Cosmic Medley" | - | Sam C. S. | Instrumental | 3:34 |
| 9. | "Reunion" | - | Sam C. S. | Instrumental | 5:28 |
| Total length: | | | | | 59:59 |

Hindi
| No. | Title | Lyrics | Music | Singer(s) | Length |
|---|---|---|---|---|---|
| 1. | "Rocketry Sri Venkatesha Suprabhatam" | Traditional | Divakar Subramaniam | Vignesh G, Sai Vignesh, Venkataramanan L, Nikhil Shankar, Vikram Pitty | 27:38 |
| 2. | "Cry of Venus" | - | Sam C. S. | Instrumental | 2:49 |
| 3. | "Behene Do" | Raj Shekhar | Nate Cornell | Aditya Rao | 4:04 |
| 4. | "Celestial Dance" | - | Sam C. S. | Instrumental | 4:50 |
| 5. | "Aasmaan" | Anurag Mishra | Billy Dawson | Aditya Rao | 3:45 |
| 6. | "Monarchs" | - | Sam C. S. | Instrumental | 5:01 |
| 7. | "Ranging Rivers" | - | Sam C. S. | Instrumental | 2:49 |
| 8. | "Cosmic Medley" | - | Sam C. S. | Instrumental | 3:34 |
| 9. | "Reunion" | - | Sam C. S. | Instrumental | 5:28 |
| Total length: | | | | | 59:59 |

Tamil
| No. | Title | Lyrics | Music | Singer(s) | Length |
|---|---|---|---|---|---|
| 1. | "Rocketry Sri Venkatesha Suprabhatam" | Traditional | Divakar Subramaniam | Vignesh G, Sai Vignesh, Venkataramanan L, Nikhil Shankar, Vikram Pitty | 27:38 |
| 2. | "Cry of Venus" | - | Sam C. S. | Instrumental | 2:49 |
| 3. | "Peruvali" | Nambi Narayanan | Nate Cornell | Aditya Rao | 4:04 |
| 4. | "Celestial Dance" | - | Sam C. S. | Instrumental | 4:50 |
| 5. | "En Kanmani" | Nambi Narayanan | Billy Dawson | Aditya Rao | 3:45 |
| 6. | "Monarchs" | - | Sam C. S. | Instrumental | 5:01 |
| 7. | "Ranging Rivers" | - | Sam C. S. | Instrumental | k2:49 |
| 8. | "Cosmic Medley" | - | Sam C. S. | Instrumental | 3:34 |
| 9. | "Reunion" | - | Sam C. S. | Instrumental | 05:28 |
| Total length: | | | | | 59:59 |

Malayalam
| No. | Title | Lyrics | Music | Singer(s) | Length |
|---|---|---|---|---|---|
| 1. | "Rocketry Sri Venkatesha Suprabhatam" | Traditional | Divakar Subramaniam | Vignesh G, Sai Vignesh, Venkataramanan L, Nikhil Shankar, Vikram Pitty | 27:38 |
| 2. | "Cry of Venus" | - | Sam C. S. | Instrumental | 2:49 |
| 3. | "Vedanaa" | Nidheesh Nadery | Nate Cornell | Aditya Rao | 4:04 |
| 4. | "Celestial Dance" | - | Sam C. S. | Instrumental | 4:50 |
| 5. | "En Kanmani" | Nidheesh Nadery | Billy Dawson | Aditya Rao | 3:45 |
| 6. | "Monarchs" | - | Sam C. S. | Instrumental | 5:01 |
| 7. | "Ranging Rivers" | - | Sam C. S. | Instrumental | 2:49 |
| 8. | "Cosmic Medley" | - | Sam C. S. | Instrumental | 3:34 |
| 9. | "Reunion" | - | Sam C. S. | Instrumental | 5:28 |
| Total length: | | | | | 59:59 |

Kannada
| No. | Title | Lyrics | Music | Singer(s) | Length |
|---|---|---|---|---|---|
| 1. | "Rocketry Sri Venkatesha Suprabhatam" | Traditional | Divakar Subramaniam | Vignesh G, Sai Vignesh, Venkataramanan L, Nikhil Shankar, Vikram Pitty | 27:38 |
| 2. | "Cry of Venus" | - | Sam C. S. | Instrumental | 2:49 |
| 3. | "Bayalali" | Naveen Tejaswi | Nate Cornell | Aditya Rao | 4:04 |
| 4. | "Celestial Dance" | - | Sam C. S. | Instrumental | 4:50 |
| 5. | "Nanna Kanmani" | Naveen Tejaswi | Billy Dawson | Aditya Rao | 3:45 |
| 6. | "Monarchs" | - | Sam C. S. | Instrumental | 5:01 |
| 7. | "Ranging Rivers" | - | Sam C. S. | Instrumental | 2:49 |
| 8. | "Cosmic Medley" | - | Sam C. S. | Instrumental | 3:34 |
| 9. | "Reunion" | - | Sam C. S. | Instrumental | 5:28 |
| Total length: | | | | | 59:59 |

== Reception ==
The music by Sam C. S. was positively received with Pratikshya Mishra of The Quint, and Srinivasa Ramanujam of The Hindu, mentioning it as "one of the film's highlights". Janani K. of India Today also praised the Sam's music "magically makes you feel different emotions", while DT Next-based Vijaya Shankar called it as "decent" and "shifts to suit the mood of the film". Behindwoods opined that Sam C. S.'s background score is "another backbone of the film" and wrote "He amplifies the dramatic portions well and makes sure the scenes are impactful, while the scenes where Nambi achieves a lot of things, the score becomes more rousing. His work is solid and makes the film far better than what it should have been."

Koimoi-based Umesh Punwani wrote "The music is moving but also a bit extra in some parts. Can’t deny Behne Do (And It Hurts) is placed in a way to churn out emotion and it does that successfully." Bollywood Hungama criticised the film's two songs as "it fails to make the mark", but opined that the Suprabhatam is well woven into the film, and Sam CS' music " is exhilarating and enhances impact in several scenes".
