= Sa Re Ga Ma Pa Seniors season 2 =

Sa Re Ga Ma Pa Seniors
- Season 2
- Presented by: Archana Chandhoke
- Judges: Srinivas; Vijay Prakash; Sujatha
- Winner: Aslam
- No. of episodes: 44

Release
- Original network: Zee Tamil
- Original release: 18 May – 10 August 2019

Season chronology
- ← Previous; Season 1 Next → Season 3

Sa Re Ga Ma Pa Seniors 2019 is a 2019 Indian-Tamil language reality singing television show, which aired on Zee Tamil from 18 May 2019 to 10 August 2019 on every Saturday and Sunday at 7:00PM (IST). Persons above the age of 18 years were permitted to audition to showcase their talent on the platform. It is the second season of Sa Re Ga Ma Pa Seniors. The three main judges of this show are playback singer and music composer Vijay Prakash, evergreen playback singers Srinivas and Sujatha. It is hosted by anchor Archana. The winner of the season was Aslam.

== Episodes ==
Episodes	Air Date(s)	Round Name	Special Guest(s)/Judge(s)
1-4	18, 19, 25, 26 May	Mega Blind Audition	-
5-6	1, 2 June	Introduction Round	Yuvan Shankar Raja
7-9	8, 9, 16 June	Free Style Round	B. H. Abdul Hameed
10-12	17, 22, 23 June	Mass Hit Round	Various actors and anchors of Zee Tamil
13-14	29, 30 June	Most Popular Hits Round	D. Imman, the cast of Kennedy Club film
15-16	06, 7 July	Disco & Retro Round	Some of the former contestants of Sa Re Ga Ma Pa (Tamil)
17-19	13, 14, 20 July	Folk Songs Round	Velmurugan, Chinnaponnu
20-22	21, 27, 28 July	Performance Round	-
23-24	3, 4 August	Devotional songs Round	B. H. Abdul Hameed, Aruna Sairam
25-26	10, 11 August	Raja kaiyavacha	Yuvan Shankar Raja, Venkat Prabhu, Premgi Amaren, Shiva
27-28	17, 18 August	7UP Chilled Out Songs	Malgudi Subha, the cast of Kanni Raasi film
29-30	24, 25 August	Judges Challenge Round	-
31-32	31 August, 1 September	Graamiya Geethangal	Pushpavanam Kuppusamy
33-34	7, 8 September	Kalyaana Paadalagal	Tippu, Harini
35-36	14, 15 September	Classical Songs Round	Mahathi, Haricharan
37-38	21, 22 September	Saregamapa Sangamam	Vijay Yesudas
39-40	28, 29 September	Nippon Paint Colours Round	Malgudi Subha
41-42	5, 6 October	One-on-One Round	-
43	12 October	Semi-Final	Yuvan Shankar Raja

== Results ==
#	1	2	3	4	5	6	7	8	9
1	Aishwarya	Aishwarya	Aishwarya	Arul Prakasam	Arul Prakasam	Aishwarya	Aishwarya	Aishwarya	Aslam
2	Arul Prakasam	Aslam	Aslam	Janagan	Aslam	Karthik	Aslam	Karthik	Karthik
3	Aslam	Karthik	Chandan Gupta	Karthik	Devanandha	Arul Prakasam	Janagan	Krishangi	Sukanya
4	Chandan Gupta	Lakshmi	Janagan	Krishangi	Janagan	Aslam	Lakshmi	Lakshmi	Aishwarya
5	Devanandha	Mridhul	Karthik	Lakshmi	Karthik	Devanandha	Reshma	Reshma	Krishangi
6	Janagan	Reshma	Lakshmi	Lavanya	Krishangi	Janagan	Karthik	Sukanya	Lakshmi
7	Karthik	Sukanya	Napolea	Napolea	Lakshmi	Krishangi	Sukanya	Aslam	Reshma
8	Krishangi	Saran	Reshma	Sukanya	Napolea	Lakshmi	Krishangi	Janagan	Janagan
9	Lavanya	Vikram	Saran	Aishwarya	Sukanya	Reshma	Devanandha	Devanandha	Devanandha
10	Napolea	Vaishnavi Kovvuri	Sukanya	Mridhul	Reshma	Sukanya	Arul Prakasam	Arul Prakasam	
11	Prakash	Janagan	Thamira	Saran	Saran	Prakash	Saran		
12	Sukanya	Krishangi	Vaishnavi Kovvuri	Aslam	Aishwarya	Saran	Prakash		
13	Vikram	Devanandha	Krishangi	Devanandha	Prakash	Mridhul			
14	Reshma	Lavanya	Devanandha	Prakash	Mridhul	Napolea			
15	Vaishnavi Kovvuri	Prakash	Mridhul	Reshma	Chandan Gupta				
16	Lakshmi	Thamira	Arul Prakasam	Chandhan Gupta	Lavanya				
17	Saran	Arul Prakasam	Lavanya	Thamira					
18	Sri Jeyanth	Napolea	Prakash	Vaishnavi Kovvuri					
19	Thamira	Chandan Gupta	Vikram						
20	Mridhul	Athisay Jain							
21	Athisay Jain	Sri Jeyanth							
22	Sabari Dharshan								
23	Soundarya								
24	Gopika								

The contestant who received the golden performance tag
The contestant who saved from danger zone
The contestant who got eliminated

=== Semi-final ===
Top 8 contestants sung as pairs in the one-one round, which is the last round before semi-final. Malgudi Subha joined as a special judge with Srinivas and Sujatha. They wrote the names of contestants in golden tickets individually and put them into a box. In the semi-final round, Yuvan Shankar Raja joined as a special judge with Srinivas, Sujatha, and Vijay Prakash and the golden ticket method continued to select finalists. At the end of the semi-final round, the top 5 contestants get qualified into final based on the number of golden tickets won by them. As the 5th place ends up in a tie, Karthik get qualified into final based on popular votes.

#	Name	Golden Tickets
1	Sukanya	17
2	Aslam	16
3	Aishwarya	14
4	Lakshmi	14
5	Karthik	13
6	Reshma	13
7	Janagan	9
8	Krishangi	9

The contestant who gets qualified into final
The contestant who got eliminated

=== Final ===
#	Name	Result
1	Aslam	Winner
2	Karthick; Sukanya	1st Runner-up
3	Aishwarya	2nd Runner-up
4	Lakshmi	3rd Runner-up
