= Rajageetham =

- Title card
- Genre: Reality; Musical
- Directed by: Shikkandar Basha
- Creative director: Shikkandar Basha
- Presented by: B. H. Abdul Hameed
- Opening theme: Rajageethamm..,
- Country of origin: India
- Original language: Tamil
- No. of seasons: 06
- No. of episodes: 67

Production
- Running time: 45 minutes

Original release
- Network: Raj TV
- Release: 5 January 2014 – present

Rajageetham (English: King of Music) is a Tamil reality show that premiered on 5 January 2014. Airs Sunday at 11:00am on Raj TV. In this program 4 participants take part, 2 males and 2 females. They sing a song and the audience judge their talent.

== Judges ==
- Singer Ganga
- Singer Dhilip
- Music Director Dharan
