= Yamini Ghantasala =

Indian Playback singer

Yamini Ghantasala is an Indian playback singer who works in Telugu and Tamil films. She is the sister of popular music director Thaman S. Ghantasala started with song Aagayamey in movie called Yaanum Theeyavan in 2016. After that, she recorded ‘Yemaindi’ in Telugu for movie Rangula Raatnam in Telugu. She also recorded Gira Gira for the film Dear Comrade.

Times of India said about her Song Gira Gira "Yamini’s enticing vocals, with her nailing the local yasa, are a major draw for this number."

Yamini is currently a contestant in the Super Singer Season 10, an Indian Tamil-language reality television singing competition show, hosted by Ma Ka Pa Anand and Priyanka Deshpande. Yamini is currently competing against 20 other contestants in Super Singer Season 10.
