= Karnan (soundtrack) =

2021 film score by Santhosh Narayanan

- Soundtrack album cover

Soundtrack album by Santhosh Narayanan
- Released: 7 March 2021
- Recorded: 2019–2020
- Genre: Feature film soundtrack
- Length: 26:28
- Language: Tamil
- Label: Think Music
- Producer: Santhosh Narayanan

Santhosh Narayanan chronology
Parris Jeyaraj (2021)	Karnan (2021)	Jagame Thandhiram (2021)
External audio
- Karnan – Audio Jukebox on YouTube

Singles from Karnan
- 1. "Kandaa Vara Sollunga" Released: 17 February 2021; 2. "Manjanathi Puranam" Released: 25 February 2021; 3. "Thattaan Thattaan" Released: 3 March 2021

Karnan is the soundtrack album for the 2021 Indian film of the same name, directed by Mari Selvaraj and produced by Kalaipuli S. Thanu. The film features music composed by Santhosh Narayanan with lyrics written by Yugabharathi and Mari Selvaraj.

Santhosh who joined the film's team in September 2019, during the pre-production works had started composing for the film during November. The soundtrack consists of folk genre numbers, being recorded by native folk artists from Tamil Nadu. The film has seven tracks with three instrumental numbers. While three of the songs which released as singles received positive response, the film's album launch was held at a formal event on 7 March 2021.

== Production ==
During September 2019, when Mari Selvaraj started the pre-production works of the film, he hired composer Santhosh Narayanan, who worked with Selvaraj in Pariyerum Perumal. The film marked Santhosh's fourth collaboration with Dhanush after Kodi, Vada Chennai and Jagame Thandhiram. In November 2019, Santhosh started the music production of the film with some folk artists across the southern region of Tamil Nadu. The background music resembling of a folk genre, accompanied by Thavil and Nadaswaram in the making video released in July 2020, received viral response from fans. In December 2020, singer Manikka Vinayagam recorded one of the songs in the film, with Santhosh highlighting the song as a major one from the album. However, the song was chosen in the final soundtrack. In March 2021, Santhosh teamed up with Macedonian Symphonic Orchestra doing the sessions for the film score. The film's audio rights were purchased by Think Music.

== Release ==
"Kandaa Vara Sollunga" is the first single to be released from the soundtrack album. The song had lyrics written by the director Mari Selvaraj, with Kidakkuzhi Mariyammal, a folk artiste from Tirunelveli district was selected to croon the song, whereas the additional vocals were provided by Santhosh Narayanan. On 17 February 2021, the team hosted a promotional pre-release event through the composer's studio and the single was released in all streaming platforms. The music video of the song was shot in monochrome featuring the singers Santhosh Narayanan and Kidakkuzhi Mariyammal, crooning the song in a studio setting, with a band of folk musicians and percussionists performing in the background. It received positive response from fans and the video crossed 1 million views within 24 hours of its release.

The second song "Pandarathi Puranam" is an oppari number and it begins with an ode to a woman by the name Pandarathi, which is about his husband's love to the woman, and his agony over her untimely death due to illness. Mari Selvaraj stated that the song is likely similar to "Karuppi" from his earlier film Pariyerum Perumal which was about an ode to a dog who was killed due to caste-breed clashes, but he stated that both the songs portray the grief of those who lost their loved ones. This song was crooned by veteran composer Deva, with additional vocals by Reetha Anthony and lyrics written by Yugabharathi and was led by native folk instruments such as nadaswaram, thavil, pambai, thalam and urumi, performed by Marungan and Haridas of the Ramanathapuram Marungan Melam Team. The music video of this song was released along with the single on 25 February 2021, which was set in a funeral featuring the lead cast members Dhanush, Lal, Yogi Babu, Rajisha Vijayan, Gouri G. Kishan and Lakshmi Priyaa Chandramouli in the song.

On 3 March 2021, the makers released the third single "Thattaan Thattaan" (which was earlier promoted under the name "Draupadhiyin Muththam"), through streaming services and as a music video in YouTube. Yugabharathi penned the lyrics for the song which had sung by Dhanush and Meenakshi Elayaraja. The song which has rain as a metaphor was filmed during the monsoon and the number also featured a poem in the beginning to describe the setting, where the song takes place and starts with the lines:

Draupathi (Rajisha Vijayan) climbed atop the hill searching for Karnan (Dhanush). Yaman (Lal) was waiting at the lake knowing that rain might strike soon. As the young boy eagerly waited for rain and smiled, it started raining, followed by a song.

The fourth and final single from the film titled "Uttradheenga Yeppov" was released along with the film's soundtrack album on 7 March 2021, with the promotional video song also being released the same day. This song was rendered by Dhee and Santhosh Narayanan, with lyrics written by Mari Selvaraj. The soundtrack album release coincided with a promotional launch event held at Prasad Labs preview theatre in Chennai with the presence of the film's cast and crew; Dhanush was absent during the launch, since he was shooting for the Netflix film The Gray Man; he released a letter expressing gratitude towards the film's director, composer, producer and the entire crew members.

== Reception ==
Ashutosh Mohan of Film Companion South wrote "The songs in Karnan are not just a musical escape. Lyrics are melded to the music and they steep the listener in Karnan's world. Santhosh Narayanan uses minimal sounds to create a specific soundscape and the music mirrors this ambiguity by setting up a permanent dissonance in the background. It's an album that rewards close, repetitive listening."

== Controversy ==
A controversy arose during the release of the first single "Kandaa Vara Sollunga" citing that Santhosh had plagiarised the tunes from the devotional song "Ange Idi Muzanguthu", performed by popular folk singer Thekkampatti S. Sunderrajan, whose version is a devotional song sung in praise of Karuppasamy. However, Santhosh had credited the singer as well as its label (Ramji Audios), during the opening of the song. After the second single "Pandarathi Puranam" being released, a resident from Madurai filed a welfare petition against the makers claiming that the use of the term "Pandarathi" is labelled offensive to certain communities in the state. He also requested a ban on the release until the song is removed from the film and the court also sent legal notices to its producers. In the wake of its controversy, director Mari Selvaraj on 17 March 2021 announced that the song will be renamed as "Manjanathi Puranam", further adding that the new title will also release in music platforms.

== Track listing ==
No.	Title	Lyrics	Singer(s)	Length
1.	"Karnan Purappadu"	–	Instrumental	4:01
2.	"Kandaa Vara Sollunga" (Karnan Azhaippu)	Mari Selvaraj	Santhosh Narayanan, Kidakkuzhi Mariyammal	4:45
3.	"Karnan Kodai"	–	Instrumental	1:14
4.	"Yen Aalu Manjanathi" (Manjanathi Puranam)	Yugabharathi	Santhosh Narayanan, Deva, Reetha Anthony	4:15
5.	"Thattaan Thattaan" (Draupathiyin Mutham)	Yugabharathi	Dhanush, Meenakshi Ilayaraja	4:50
6.	"Uttradheenga Yeppov" (Karnanin Yuththam)	Mari Selvaraj	Dhee, Santhosh Narayanan	4:49
7.	"Karnan Theme"	–	Instrumental	3:12
Total length:				26:28

== Background score ==
Karnan

Film score by Santhosh Narayanan
- Released: 14 May 2021
- Genre: Film score
- Length: 48:27
- Language: Tamil
- Label: Think Music
- Producer: Santhosh Narayanan
External audio
- Karnan – Original Score on YouTube

The film further featured twenty one songs in the background score, that was released as a separate album on 14 May 2021.

No.	Title	Length
1.	"Hero"	1:53
2.	"Podiyankulam Makkal"	1:49
3.	"Oppression"	1:25
4.	"Podiyankulam"	1:55
5.	"Bus Stop"	1:04
6.	"Kaatu Pechi Found"	1:06
7.	"Life of Kaatu Pechi"	1:18
8.	"Conflict"	2:05
9.	"Breaking Point"	5:15
10.	"Station Attack"	3:58
11.	"Sins"	1:47
12.	"Stuggle"	1:52
13.	"Manjanathi Purusha"	2:21
14.	"Boy on the Horse"	1:46
15.	"Karnan Theme"	2:16
16.	"War"	2:12
17.	"Coming Home"	1:25
18.	"Nadaswaram Theme"	5:54
19.	"Yaeman Thaatha"	1:48
20.	"Teaser Music"	1:52
21.	"Karnan Aattam"	4:08
Total length:		48:27
