= Thenali =

2000 film by K. S. Ravikumar

- Theatrical release poster
- Directed by: K. S. Ravikumar
- Screenplay by: K. S. Ravikumar
- Dialogue by: Crazy Mohan
- Produced by: R. Karpagam
- Starring: Kamal Haasan; Jayaram; Devayani; Jyothika
- Cinematography: Priyan
- Edited by: K. Thanikachalam
- Music by: A. R. Rahman
- Production company: R. K. Celluloids
- Release date: 26 October 2000
- Running time: 165 minutes
- Country: India
- Language: Tamil
- Box office: ₹300 million

Thenali (/θɛnɑːli/) is a 2000 Indian Tamil-language comedy film directed and co-written by K. S. Ravikumar. The film stars Kamal Haasan, Jayaram, Devayani and Jyothika, with Delhi Ganesh, Charle, Ramesh Khanna and Madhan Bob in supporting roles. It revolves around the title character who follows his psychiatrist Kailash on vacation to cure his numerous phobias. When Thenali becomes closer to Kailash's family, Kailash becomes increasingly obsessed with getting rid of him.

Thenali, inspired by the 1991 American film What About Bob?, is the first film produced by Ravikumar's company R. K. Celluloids, and the dialogues were written by Crazy Mohan. It was photographed by Priyan and edited by K. Thanikachalam, while the music was composed by A. R. Rahman. The film was shot predominantly in Ooty and Kodaikanal, while some song sequences were shot in New Zealand.

Thenali was released on 26 October 2000 to positive reviews and became a silver jubilee hit. The film won three Tamil Nadu State Film Awards, including a Special Jury award for Jayaram's performance, and Ravikumar won the Cinema Express Award for Best Director – Tamil.

== Plot ==
Thenali Soman is a Sri Lankan Tamil refugee who has come to Chennai for psychiatric treatment. This is because of numerous phobias he has developed due to the Sri Lankan civil war. B. Pancha Bhootam and his assistant, the doctors treating Thenali, are jealous of a relatively junior doctor Kailash getting substantial media attention. They send Thenali over to him, believing his failure to cure Thenali of his phobias will derail his success. Soon after Thenali's first appointment with Kailash, the latter plans to head to Kodaikanal on vacation with his wife Jalaja and their two children. He tells Thenali to wait until after the vacation before his therapy can begin, but Pancha Bhootam asks for Thenali to go meet Kailash while on vacation.

Thenali reaches Kailash's Kodaikanal house. He falls in love with Janaki, Kailash's younger sister, which is vehemently opposed by the latter. Kailash becomes increasingly mad with Thenali's antics and even begins to suspect that his wife has an affair with Thenali, as she has a soft corner for the latter. He later sends Thenali to prison on a false charge, but this results in negative media attention and Janaki becoming depressed, so Kailash begrudgingly has Thenali released, saying the arrest was simply part of his "therapy". He eventually tries to kill Thenali by tying him to a tree with a time bomb. Thenali, thinking it is a fake bomb used only to relieve him from his fears, removes it and puts it in Kailash's house for future use where it explodes. Seeing this, Kailash suffers a paralytic attack. Thenali later marries Janaki; during the ceremony he incorrectly believes Kailash was tricked into buying a real bomb.

While Thenali, Kailash, and family are at a picnic, Thenali's long-lost wife whose name is also Janaki shows up and reunites with him. Enraged, Kailash jumps out of his wheelchair and berates Thenali for ruining his sister Janaki's life but soon realises this was all a set-up by Thenali to cure Kailash's paralysis; the woman is actually actress Meena, who Thenali hired to pose as his wife. Kailash realises his mistake and thanks Thenali.

== Cast ==
- Kamal Haasan as Thenali Soman
- Jayaram as Dr. Kailash
- Devayani as Jalaja
- Jyothika as Janaki
- Delhi Ganesh as B. Pancha Bhootam
- Charle as Kanthaswamy
- Ramesh Khanna as Pancha Bhootam's assistant
- Madhan Bob as "Diamond" Babu
- Master Suraj as Arjun
- Baby Taj Nisha as Aishwarya
- Crane Manohar as the servant
- Lavanya as the Raj TV reporter
- Bayilvan Ranganathan as the inspector
- Mayilsamy as a police officer
- Telephone Raj as a police constable
- Meena as herself (cameo)
- Vijayakumari as the mental patient (cameo)
- B. H. Abdul Hameed as himself (cameo)
- K. S. Ravikumar as himself (cameo)
- Kottai Perumal as a bystander

== Production ==
=== Development ===
After the success of K. S. Ravikumar's directorial Padayappa (1999), Kamal Haasan approached him, since production on Haasan's Marudhanayagam was delayed and he wanted to act in two films in a year. While Haasan planned to direct one himself (Hey Ram), he offered Ravikumar to direct the other, and Ravikumar agreed. Haasan later asked Ravikumar if he would also produce the film. Though Ravikumar was initially in a dilemma, with encouragement from Rajinikanth, who starred in Ravikumar's Muthu (1995) and Padayappa, he agreed. The film thus became the first one produced by Ravikumar's company R. K. Celluloids, with his wife Karpagam handling production duties.

Due to Haasan's commitments to Hey Ram lasting almost a year, Ravikumar spent the time by "writ[ing] a few stories" for him. The title Thenali was suggested by Rajinikanth for the story that was finalised. The core premise, that of the lead character following his reluctant psychiatrist on vacation, was inspired by the American film What About Bob? (1991), but Ravikumar opted against making a shot-for-shot adaptation. Cinematography was handled by Priyan, art direction by Maniraj, dance choreography by Tarun Kumar and stunt choreography by Vikram Dharma.

To emphasise the film's comedy, Crazy Mohan was hired to write the dialogues. The Sri Lankan broadcaster B. H. Abdul Hameed subsequently convinced Mohan to change certain dialogue deliveries to incorporate the Jaffna Tamil dialects and as a result, Mohan had to trim the dialogues which he wrote beforehand, thinking that could well and truly set with the filmmaking. Hameed played a major role in penning dialogues for scenes involving issues related to Sri Lankan civil conflicts.

=== Casting ===
Kamal Haasan played the title character, Thenali Soman. He said he chose to do the film "mainly because it was a K. S. Ravikumar film. I knew his talent and was sure that he would spring a few surprises in the comedy". Ravikumar felt the film needed a unique selling point, and Haasan remembered the original script of Anbe Sivam (2003) he discussed with Ravikumar, in which Haasan's character was a Sri Lankan Tamil; hence the title character of Thenali was changed into one. To get the right accent, Haasan took lessons from B. H. Abdul Hameed, who made a cameo appearance in the film. He invited Hameed to assist him with the appropriate usage of the Jaffna Tamil dialogues and to make inroads with the correct usage of Jaffna Tamil dialects to sync with the plot of the film and to connect with the target audience. Hameed spent over a month in dubbing and production of the film project with the intention of assisting Haasan to train him speak in Jaffna Tamil. Haasan used K. S. Balachandran's audio cassettes to help perfect his accent.

Mohanlal and Simran were considered for playing the psychiatrist Kailash and his sister Janaki, before Jayaram and Jyothika were cast. Simran has stated that, though she liked the script, to her dismay the role required body exposure; she therefore demanded an exorbitant fee so that she would be rejected, and succeeded. Ravikumar chose Jayaram because of his "ear for comedy", and Jyothika after seeing pictures of her from Poovellam Kettuppar (1999). Jyothika's casting caused widespread scepticism as she had acted only in a few films to that point, and was not yet an established star. Devayani, who portrayed Kailash's wife Jalaja, accepted to act in the film at Ravikumar's request, without asking about details such as the story or the lead actor; she later realised that she would not be paired opposite Haasan, but did not mind being side-lined by Jyothika.

Vivek was offered the role of Diamond Babu and took an advance, but later left as he felt he "didn't have the best laugh lines"; the role later went to Madhan Bob. Delhi Ganesh and Ramesh Khanna were cast as the psychiatrist Pancha Bhootam and his assistant at Haasan's insistence. Meena, who had been approached by Ravikumar to star in some of his earlier films but declined due to unavailability of dates, was asked to do at least a cameo in Thenali, and agreed. She portrays a fictional version of herself. Yugi Sethu has stated that he was offered to act in the film by Haasan, but was unable to accept due to his commitment to the TV series Nayyandi Durbar.

=== Filming ===
The film was launched at the Kalaivanar Arangam in Chennai on 22 March 2000 with Y. G. Mahendran as compere and with Rajinikanth as chief guest. Scenes were shot predominantly in Ooty and Kodaikanal, while some song sequences were shot in New Zealand. A scene required Jyothika and Haasan to kiss; in contrast to other Tamil film actresses at that time, Jyothika agreed without hesitation. While filming the scene where Pancha Bhootam and his assistant jump into a lake, Ganesh and Ramesh Khanna did so despite the "freezing temperature". Haasan later gave them self-made kashayam to prevent illness. While filming other scenes, Haasan was the only one wearing a coat; the other cast members including Devayani and Jyothika had to "brave the temperature and get wet in the rain for a sequence".

Haasan would describe in detail on how to make his core audience of city-bred people laugh to Ravikumar, who would then add slapstick elements to make it applicable to rural audiences too. For one part of the "Porkalam Ange" song sequence, Jyothika and Jayaram dressed like African tribal people. Jyothika sported dreadlocks, and Jayaram's attire took 20 minutes to wear. The background artists had white paint applied throughout their body and wore plastic leaves. During the filming of the climax where Kailash slaps Thenali, Jayaram had no issues since he was "quite comfortable" with Haasan, the two having previously appeared together in the Malayalam film Chanakyan (1989). The shoot of the film was completed in 25 days.

=== Post-production ===
Thenali was edited by K. Thanikachalam. It is the first film where Haasan was credited as "Ulaga Nayagan" (Universal Hero). The idea to create a graphic title card containing this honorific was Ravikumar's, and Haasan relented after initial reluctance. Although Haasan had by then undergone a body transformation for acting in Aalavandhan (2001), Ravikumar was unfazed since he only needed Haasan's eyes to be filmed for the title card. The title card begins with Haasan's office in Chennai, then zooms out to show the Earth, which then transforms into one of Haasan's eyeballs, and he winks, with the terms "Universal Hero" and "Ulaga Nayagan" appearing soon after. Jyothika's voice was dubbed by Savitha Radhakrishnan. Thenali is the 49th film for visual effects supervisor Madhu Sudhanan.

== Soundtrack ==
The soundtrack of the film was composed by A. R. Rahman, and released under the labels Saregama and RPG Music. Rahman initially refused Ravikumar's offer to work on the film due to numerous Bollywood and international commitments. But after the Indo-Canadian film Water was delayed, he accepted Thenali. Due to a rift between Rahman and his then usual lyricist Vairamuthu, Rahman chose six different lyricists: Ilayakamban, Kalaikumar, Arivumathi, Piraisoodan, Pa. Vijay and Thamarai, all collaborating with Rahman for the first time. The song "Alangatti Mazhai" marks the singing debut of Sharanya Srinivas, who sang only one line. The song "Injerungo", written by Thamarai, features Jaffna slang. The song "Swasame" is set in Hamir Kalyani raga, and was re-used in the final scene of the 2009 American film The Accidental Husband.

Track listing
No.	Title	Lyrics	Singer(s)	Length
1.	"Alangatti Mazhai"	Kalaikumar	Kamal Haasan, Srinivas, Sujatha Mohan, Baby Silono Rath, Sharanya Srinivas	5:34
2.	"Athini Sithini"	Arivumathi	Hariharan, Chitra Sivaraman, Kamal Haasan	5:35
3.	"Injerungo"	Thamarai	Kamal Haasan, K. S. Chithra, Clinton Cerejo	6:15
4.	"Porkalam"	Piraisoodan	Srinivas, Gopika Poornima	6:35
5.	"Swasame"	Pa. Vijay	S. P. Balasubrahmanyam, Sadhana Sargam, Srinivas	5:48
6.	"Thenali"	Ilayakamban	Shankar Mahadevan, Clinton Cerejo	6:01
Total length:				35:48

== Release ==
Thenali was released on 26 October 2000, Diwali day. Despite being released alongside other Diwali releases such as Seenu, Priyamaanavale, Vaanavil and Kannukku Kannaga, the film became a silver jubilee hit, and grossed over ₹300 million (US$3.1 million). In Malaysia, it was the most successful Tamil film of the year, grossing RM 1.35 million. The film also performed well in Sri Lanka.

=== Critical reception ===
Thenali received positive reviews from critics. Malathi Rangarajan of The Hindu gave a verdict that the film was a "wholesome mix of rip-roaring action, witty dialogues and exotic locales". She was particularly appreciative of Jayaram's performance, Haasan's Sri Lankan diction and his comedic prowess, "both the physical and dialogue-oriented kind", adding, "Logic has no place in the story, which is only meant to make you laugh". Rajitha of Rediff.com stated, "The comedy is on a single track in Thenali" and that "it is more tiresome than humorous". She appreciated the technical aspects of the film but was critical of the music. Visual Dasan of Kalki lauded Haasan's delivery of Sri Lankan accented Tamil, but said the real show stealer with regards to acting was Jayaram. He also appreciated the dialogues written by Mohan, but felt Jyothika was underutilised. Tamil Star wrote that Ravikumar, Mohan and Haasan "have offered an enjoyable comic fare", but criticised the music, though the reviewer said "it is to be commended that each lyricists has put in his best in his lyrics".

Writing for Chennai Online, Malini Mannath said, "Kamal's perfect timing for comedy, matched equally by Jairam, the antics of Delhi Ganesh and Ramesh Khanna, the humour, some situational, some slapstick, and Crazy Mohan's lines sustain the film for sometime. But then how long can one fool around with a one-line story? The second half has its dragging moments and some forced humour. Rehman's tunes are not very inspiring, the song picturisation too leaving much to be desired". Indiainfo lauded Haasan's "flawless" Sri Lankan accent, but felt the film had "nothing new to offer", criticised the music, dance choreography and cinematography. The critic added that Jayaram's performance "matches Kamal [Haasan] but otherwise the other artistes [Devayani] and Jyothika have nothing much to offer".

=== Accolades ===
Event	Category	Recipient(s)	Ref.
PACE Trust Cine Awards 2000	Best Director	K. S. Ravikumar	
Tamil Nadu State Film Awards	Best Lyricist	Thamarai	
Tamil Nadu State Film Awards	Best Art Director	Maniraj	
Tamil Nadu State Film Awards	Special Prize	Jayaram	
Film Fans Association Awards	Best Supporting Actor	Jayaram	
Cinema Express Awards	Best Director – Tamil	K. S. Ravikumar	

== Other versions ==
Thenali was dubbed into Telugu as Tenali under the production of S. P. Balasubrahmanyam. In 2006, a Kannada remake supposed to star Ramesh Aravind, Jaggesh, Deepu and Manasi was announced, but was later dropped. A Bengali remake was reportedly being planned in the 2010s, but that did not materialise.
