= B. H. Abdul Hameed =

Sri Lankan television presenter, radio announcer, lyricist, and actor

- பி. எச். அப்துல் ஹமீட்
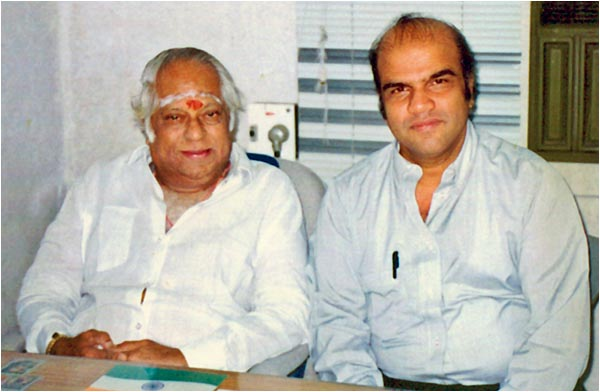
- B. H. Abdul Hameed (on the right side) sitting in a boardroom alongside veteran iconic Indian music composer M. S. Viswanathan (on the left side)
- Born: 11 April 1949 (age 76); Dematagoda, Western Province, Ceylon
- Education: Dematagoda Vipulanantha Tamil Maha Vidyalayam
- Occupations: broadcaster, television presenter, radio announcer, lyricist, drama artist and actor
- Years active: 1960-present
- Organization: Sri Lanka Broadcasting Corporation
- Known for: broadcasting, radio programming
- Notable work: Komalihalin Kummalam
- Website: www.bhabdulhameed.com

B. H. Abdul Hameed (Sinhala: බි.එච්. අබ්දුල් හමීඩ්, Tamil: பி. எச். அப்துல் ஹமீட்; born 11 April 1949) is a Sri Lankan broadcaster, television presenter, radio announcer, lyricist, drama artist and actor. He made his mark and gained popularity by working as an anchor in Indian Tamil television reality shows. He was also dubbed as the voice of the Radio Ceylon mainly highlighting his fluency and pronunciation of Tamil language and wordings. During his career spanning over five decades as a broadcaster, he has frequently conducted interviews with celebrities.

== Biography ==
B. H. Abdul Hameed grew up in a difficult family background which encountered challenges pertaining to poverty. His mother was the breadwinner in the family as she supported the family by cooking and selling food in their locality. He pursued his primary education at Vipulanantha Tamil Maha Vidyalayam in Dematagoda. Since his early childhood days, he showed reluctance towards traditional studies, but he showed his passion and hunger for success by taking part in extracurricular activities in school. Although he was unpopular for his academic performance, he was appreciated by his teachers for showcasing his skills in speech, drama and acting abilities. His close friend Joseph Edward accompanied him by taking him to Sri Lanka Broadcasting Corporation to watch the recording of the Siruvar Malar program, which itself became an iconic nostalgic memory for Hameed and he used that experience as his source of inspiration.

Many sources and publications apparently spread rumours and speculations stating Hameed along with his wife had been killed by a mob during the middle of the 1983 Black July anti-Tamil riots in Sri Lanka and such claims were eventually refuted and denied by Hameed himself. Upon hearing such claims, the then Sri Lankan President Ranasinghe Premadasa, ordered and provided instructions to respective authorities to bring Hameed safely to the headquarters of Sri Lanka Broadcasting Corporation.

== Career ==
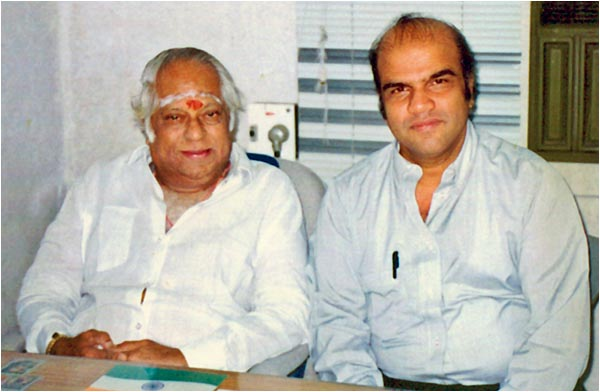
B. H. Abdul Hameed sitting right next to veteran iconic Indian music composer M. S. Viswanathan

B. H. Abdul Hameed made his entry as a child artist, albeit in a serendipitous manner by replacing child artist Marikkar S. Ramdas who was supposed to take part in the Siruvar Malar program, but the latter was absent due to sickness on an eventful day. The producer of the Siruvar Malar program conducted a mini audition among the youngsters to find a replacement and he also took part in the audition ultimately securing the role. Hameed grabbed the opportunity with both hands stepping in as a replacement artist, as he regularly attended the Siruvar Malar program as a spectator observing the performance of artists from the outer ring. He achieved immense success through his satisfying performances in Siruvar Malar program also landed him an offer to participate in Ilaigar Manram, a program dedicated to awareness for young people. He then went on to have a long stint working predominantly with Sri Lanka Broadcasting Corporation gaining vital exposure in the field of broadcasting. He later served in the role of a relief announcer after being encouraged to do so by the producer V. A. Sivaganam. Although he was initially hesitant on becoming the relief announcer with a sense of self-doubt, he recalled his experiences of Siruvar Malar and Ilaigar Manram to capitalise as well as bank on his capabilities to prolong his career pathway. He also obtained extensive training from several prominent personalities, including S. K. Pararajasingam, Sanmuganathan, Vernon Corea and Kokila Sivaraja. He also attained the fortune of learning the art of radio drama production techniques at the Radio Netherlands Training Centre by pursuing a training course for a duration of six months.

He worked for Radio Ceylon which was regarded as the oldest radio network in Asia. He also made his entry into commercial broadcasting which was way more professional and he became an inevitable option when one of the senior broadcasters S. P. Mylvaganam was sent on a compulsory leave. Hameed was handpicked by commercial agents to proceed further. He hosted his first commercial program titled Navarasak Kovai where he incorporated a short drama into the picture, recognizing that radio storytelling is a powerful art form to capture the attention of audiences. Hameed became the first Sri Lankan broadcaster at the Sri Lanka Broadcasting Corporation to produce a radio drama script set on an actual location literally on the railway track. He took fellow artists on a train journey to compile and record the story with an implementation of a paradigm shift mentality by incorporating an out-of-the-box thinking mindset. Professor Sivaththamby complemented Hameed by recognizing him as the first person to introduce a tradition in Tamil broadcasting where the core plot of a program was introduced in a clear and precise pattern for the audience. He also engaged in an experimental project by taking subject matter focusing on covering the several dialects spoken in Sri Lanka through his radio drama titled Komalikal Kondattam, which was later made into a film. He also roped in prominent Indian actors Gemini Ganesan and Sridevi for his radio program titled Anichcha Malar. He went into record voices of both Sridevi and Gemini Ganesan for his ambitious radio program and he had nearly spent about five days to complete one episode of Anichcha Malar. Hameed also acted in the Sri Lankan Tamil-language film Komaligal (1976), which was deemed as a landmark moment in Sri Lankan film industry as it was an ambitious bold attempt to revive the Sri Lankan Tamil cinema. Komaligal upon theatrical release across Sri Lanka opened to positive reception and became a commercial success at the box office. Hameed portrayed the role of a typical Brahmin iyer in Komaligal and the film itself was the remake of his own radio programme Komalihalin Kummalam. His radio program Komalihalin Kummalam was a sleeper hit among the general audience for the conversations appealing in line with the audience taste, but it also prompted controversies over allegedly mocking and insulting southern Muslims and their Southern language dialects during conversations. Later on, Komalihalin Kummalam made some modifications to their programme and included a plethora of characters representing different faiths and religious groups as a response to racial allegations.

In the late 1990s, post 1998 he decided to quit Sri Lanka Broadcasting Corporation after experiencing issues related to political pressure, and intervention of politicians and he eventually began losing interest in accepting higher positions within the Sri Lanka Broadcasting Corporation. His thought process was that he might lose his sense of creativity and independence which made him leave the Sri Lankan radio network and he began working as an independent broadcaster and media personality by travelling to various regions in the world. He also lent his voice as a background theme for the logo announcement of Raj TV in order to display in the break between advertisements and programmes. He also wrote the lyrics for the title song of the Raj TV program Rajageetham. He stamped his authority and elevated his foothold by hosting Lalithavin Pattuku Pattu singing reality television show which was aired in Sun TV and later in Kalaignar. His vocal variation along with fluent Tamil accent which he displayed in Lalithavin Pattuku Pattu caught the attention of public and the show also gained substantial increase in television rating points. He has also been occasionally invited as a celebrity guest in Indian Tamil cinema functions and ceremonies.

He acted in Suryodayam (1999) which was initially titled by the filmmakers as Isaip Payanangal. He also closely worked with veteran Indian actor Kamal Haasan for the film Thenali (2000) directed by K. S. Ravikumar, where Hameed himself made a cameo appearance in a film sequence. It was Kamal Haasan who invited Hameed to assist him with the appropriate usage of the Jaffna Tamil dialogues and to make inroads with the correct usage of Jaffna Tamil dialects in order to sync with the plot of the film and to connect with the target audience. Hameed subsequently convinced Crazy Mohan to change certain dialogue deliveries to incorporate the Jaffna Tamil dialects and as a result, Crazy Mohan had to trim the dialogues which he wrote beforehand thinking that could well and truly set with the filmmaking. It was also revealed that Hameed played a major hand in penning dialogues for scenes involving issues related to Sri Lankan civil conflicts. Hameed spent over a month in dubbing and production of Thenali with the intention of assisting Kamal Haasan to speak in Jaffna Tamil. He also assisted lyricist Thamarai by figuring out a list of Jaffna slang and culturally rooted Tamil words for the song "Injerungo" which featured in the soundtrack album of Thenali. He also received sharp criticism for his intervention in the shooting process and production of Thenali from media critics. He also penned lyrics for the song "Signore Signore" which featured in the soundtrack album of Kannathil Muthamittal (2002). Hameed induced the use of Sinhalese language wordings into the lyrics of the song "Signore Signore" which garnered him significant attention. He also featured in a minor role in Kannathil Muthamittal which was directed by renowned filmmaker Mani Ratnam.

He recalled a famous incident which took place during his career as a broadcaster during the 1980s, when he met and interviewed veteran Indian actor Rajinikanth who visited Sri Lanka to complete a shooting schedule for his highly anticipated film project Thee (1981). He recalled memories of his interviewing scenario with veteran Indian actor Sivaji Ganesan when the latter made a visit to the Sri Lankan shores in order to collect donations as part of a fundraising campaign specifically catering to the victims who were adversely affected by the inclement weather and torrential rain falls in Tamil Nadu resulting in flash floods. Hameed also received another opportunity to interview Sivaji Ganesan this time when the latter visited Sri Lanka for an Indo-Sri Lanka collaboration venture film project titled Pilot Premnath (1978). B. H. Abdul Hameed insisted that Sivaji Ganesan made a polite friendly gesture towards him by affectionately calling him "Vango captain Sambasivam" in a friendly manner, referring to his popular character name in the radio play titled Oru Veedu Koyilakirathu. It was later revealed that Sivaji Ganesan became a fan of B. H. Abdul Hameed's radio broadcasting.

He also interviewed Indian music composer A. R. Rahman, who at that time was a newbie to the Indian music fraternity, but gained significant fanfare within a short tenure leading to a National Award win in 1994 after being in contention for the prestigious award, despite criticism levelled against him pertaining to the usage of technology in order to elevate the music composition for the film projects. His interview with then relatively new young composer A. R. Rahman was deemed as a fresh breath of air among the film fraternity despite the criticism of the young composer's over-reliance on the usage of technology over voice to elevate his musical rendition. In May 2015, he also hosted the second edition of the Innisai Varpugal which was held at The Music Academy with the special collaborative efforts undertaken by The New Indian Express and Gala events. He was invited as a special guest for the freestyle round and devotional songs round during the Sa Re Ga Ma Pa Seniors season 2 (2019) aired in Zee Tamil. He served as the honourable patron of the Sri Lankan Tamil-language film Komaali Kings (2018), which was a much anticipated Sri Lankan made Tamil film to release.

In 2022, he wrote and published his autobiography titled Vanalaikalil Oru Vazhippokkan (A Wayfarer on the Airwaves). Veteran Indian actor Kamal Haasan graced the book launch of Hameed's autobiography Vanalaikalil Oru Vazhippokkan at a grand function by showcasing it for public view. In 2023, he made a personal visit to Australia with the plan to launch his book Vanalaikalil Oru Vazhippokkan, and he visited to the three major cities in Australia including Sydney, Melbourne and Adelaide to officially launch the book. In his book Vanalaikalil Oru Vazhippokkan, he recounted his personal memories and experiences which he witnessed in his five decades long career in broadcasting and media, highlighting the challenges and achievements which came on his way. His book also gives thought process into understanding the evolution of Tamil broadcasting. The book also consists of about 23 chapters dedicated to portraying the evolution of Tamil broadcasting which had its leaps and bounds while also acknowledging the contributions of B. H. Abdul Hameed's colleagues who have made an impact in the broadcasting industry. The 23 chapters in the book also includes additional annexure with write-ups by K. Sivaththamby, Kamal Hasan and Sillayur Selvarasan about how they see B. H. Abdul Hameed in their own narratives and perspectives. The book also showcases that Hameed was among the few individuals who produced a sufficient yet significant number of poetry dramas. His most notable poetry dramas include “Kuyil Pattu” (Subramania Bharati), “Devane Un Kural” (P. Sathyaseelan), “Romeo Juliet” (Sillayur Selverajan) and “Yaal-Padi” (Ambi). He also pushed his case further with the advent of adaptation of the stage dramas such as “Usiyul Noolum” (Latees Veeramani) for radio. He also plied his trade as a stage drama director when he directed Mahdi Hasan's Manaththirai with a clear focus on national cohesion.

In March 2024, he was appointed as one of the jury members of the Raigam Tele'es to commemorate the 20th edition of the Raigam television awards which was held at the Hotel Shangri-La, Colombo.

== Filmography ==
- Komaligal (1976)
- Suryodayam (1999)
- Thenali (2000)
- Kannathil Muthamittal (2002)

== See also ==
- List of Sri Lankan broadcasters
