= Ashwin Kumar Lakshmikanthan =

Indian actor

Ashwin Kumar
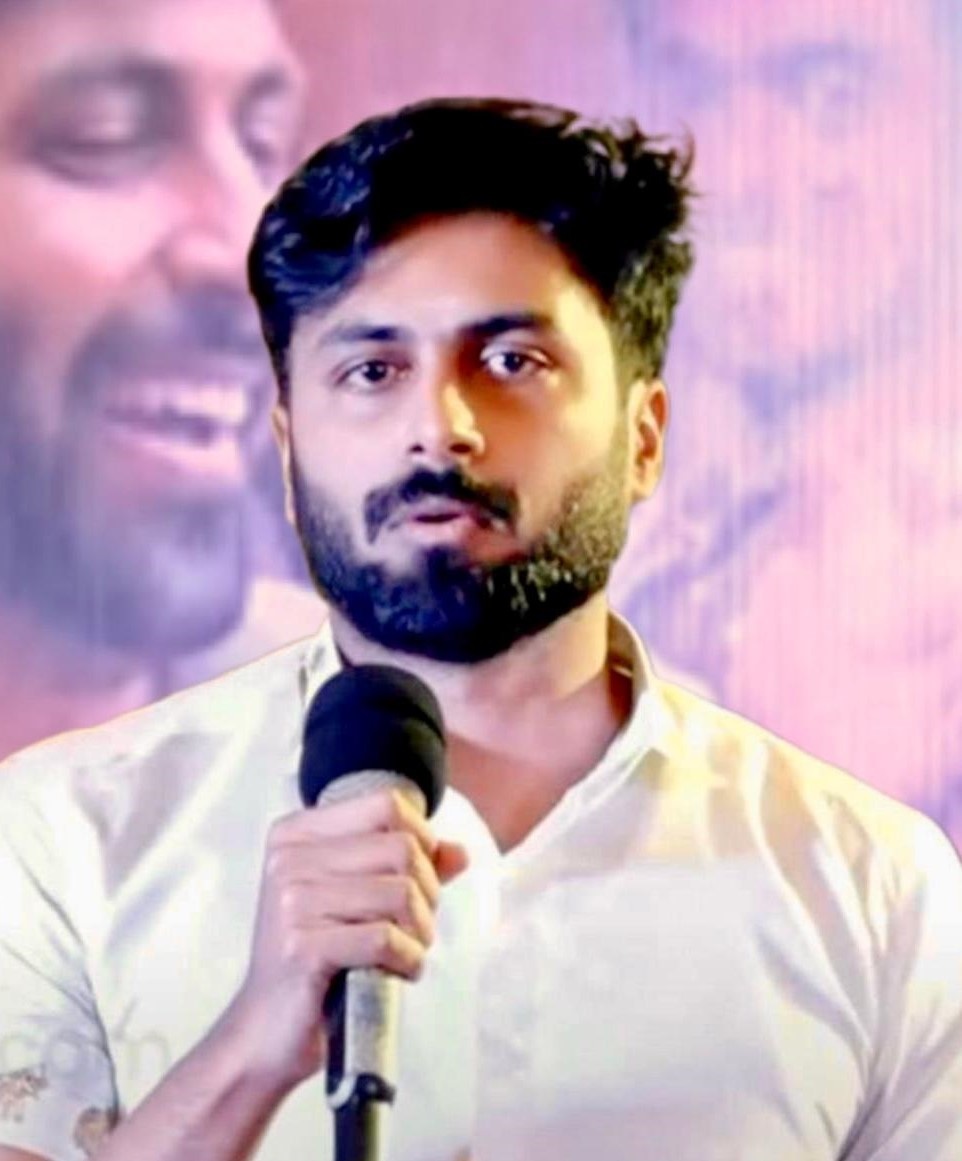
- Ashwin Kumar in 2021
- Born: Ashwin Kumar Lakshmikanthan; 7 May 1991 (age 35); Coimbatore, Tamil Nadu, India
- Education: Kumaraguru College of Technology (B.E. Mech); PSG Institute of Management (MBA)
- Occupations: Actor; Model
- Years active: 2014–present
- Spouse: K.Bhuvaneshwari (m. 2026)

Ashwin Kumar Lakshmikanthan (born 7 May 1991) is an Indian actor, works predominantly in Tamil films and television. He played the lead roles in the series Rettai Vaal Kuruvi (2015) and Ninaikka Therintha Manamae (2017), and had supportive roles in films such as O Kadhal Kanmani (2015) and Adithya Varma (2019). He rose to prominence after contesting in the 2021 reality programme Cooku with Comali season 2. The Times of India named him the "Most Desirable Man on Television 2020", in its Chennai Times edition.

He played the lead in Enna Solla Pogirai (2022), Meet Cute (2022) and Sembi (2022).

== Early life and education ==
Born and brought up in Coimbatore, Ashwin Kumar completed his schooling in Carmel Garden. He pursued his bachelor's degree in Mechanical Engineering from Kumaraguru College of Technology and completed Master of Business Administration from PSG Institute of Management. During his college days, he developed a passion for acting and attended auditions for films and TV series.

== Career ==
=== Television ===
Ashwin Kumar made his television debut on Star Vijay's serial, Office. He played the lead roles in the serials Rettai Vaal Kuruvi (2015) and Ninaika Therintha Manamae (2017). He also played the lead in Raja Rani, a Telugu remake of the hit Tamil serial Saravanan Meenatchi on Star Maa. Following the end of the series, he appeared in the short films Blink, Cinderella, 3 Scenes of his love story, and Kadhal Ondru Kanden.

He was one of the contestants in the cooking reality show Cooku with Comali – Season 2 on Star Vijay. He was the second runner-up in the finale, and received the "Most Popular Male on Reality Television" award at the Behindwoods Gold Icons 2021 for his performance in Cooku with Comali.

=== Films ===
At the start of his film career, Ashwin Kumar played a minor role in Mani Ratnam's O Kadhal Kanmani as a colleague of Dulquer Salmaan's character. He had portrayed the role of Dhruv Vikram's brother in the film Adithya Varma.

He played the lead in the romantic comedy movie Enna Solla Pogirai (2022). During the audio launch of Enna Solla Pogirai, Ashwin's speech that he had dozed halfway through the narration of 40 stories due to weak scripts, stirred controversy. Later he apologised, stating that he was completely distorted by fans' love and never intended to disrespect anyone. The film was released on the week of Pongal 2022 and a critic with the Times of India wrote "Ashwin makes a confident leap to leading man".

He made his Telugu debut with Meet Cute, an anthology film directed by debutante Deepthi Ghanta and produced by Nani. This Telugu anthology consists of five conversational shorts on modern-day relationships. He played the lead role in the segment, Meet the boy. He had next played the lead in Prabhu Solomon's film, titled Sembi, alongside actors Kovai Sarala and Thambi Ramaiah. Touted to be an intense social drama, set against the backdrop of Kodaikanal, the film was produced by Trident Arts. The film received highly positive reviews from critics and audiences upon release and Ashwin's performance as a lawyer, a nameless saviour was widely appreciated. A critic from Sakshi Post wrote "Ashwin Kumar as a lawyer keeps the audience on the egde of their seats in the second half with his brilliant show. He has made full use of the opportunity to prove his acting prowess".

He featured in an ensemble cast in Hot Spot 2 Much, a socio-satirical sequel to the 2024 Tamil anthology film Hot Spot, directed by Vignesh Karthick. Ashwin's performance in the fantasy-driven Love segment was a comeback, following his brief hiatus due to a severe shoulder injury. He is next playing the lead in the action thriller film titled Nodikku Nodi, directed by Vijay Adhiraj alongside actors Shaam and Narain.. He is next headlining the movie Good News, alongside actor Jayaram in a family entertainer from Movietron productions.

=== Web Series ===
Ashwin Kumar had a lead role in Thanthu Vitten Ennai, a web series produced by Zee5. He was also part of the horror-thriller web series Live Telecast directed by Venkat Prabhu for Disney+ Hotstar. He had played the lead as a Police officer in the crime thriller, titled Dhoolpet Police Station. This series streamed on Aha Tamil and explored themes on crime and power.

=== Music videos and model work ===
Ashwin Kumar is the lead actor in the music videos "Cloning Kadhal", "Rhythm of Life" (Sony Music), "Shades of Kadhal", "Kutty Pattas" (Sony Music), "Criminal Crush", "Loner", "Adipoli" (Think Music), "Baby Nee Sugar", "Yaathi Yaathi" (Sony Music), "Vaadi Vaadi" (Think Music), "VannaMayilae" (Noise and Grains) and "Adada" (VYRLOriginals).

He had given voice-over in the music audio 11:11 – Guru undu Bhayamillai, composed by Ady Kriz. As a model, he has worked in multiple TV commercials and print adverts for various brands. He was a brand ambassador of Zee Thirai.

== Personal life ==
On 20 November 2026, Ashwin Kumar married Bhuvaneshwari in a traditional Tamil wedding ceremony in Coimbatore.

== Filmography ==
=== Films ===
Key
†	Denotes films that have not yet been released

- All work is in Tamil, unless otherwise noted.

Year	Title	Role	Notes	Ref.
2014	Kathai Thiraikathai Vasanam Iyakkam	Arya's friend	Deleted scene	
2014	Nerungi Vaa Muthamidathe	Maya's friend		
2015	O Kadhal Kanmani	Aditya's co-worker	Uncredited role	
2019	Enai Noki Paayum Thota	Saranya's groom	Uncredited role	
2019	July Kaatril	Shreya's yoga friend		
2019	Adithya Varma	Siddharth Varma		
2020	Indha Nilai Maarum	Surya		
2021	Oh Manapenne!	Arjun		
2022	Enna Solla Pogirai	Vikram		
2022	Sembi	Sembi's lawyer		
2023	Anni Manchi Sakunamule	Ram	Telugu film	
2026	Hot Spot 2 Much	Yugan	Tamil anthology film Segment - Yours Lovingly, Love	
2026	Nodikku Nodi †	TBA	Filming	
2026	Good News †	TBA	Post Production	

=== Television ===
Year	Serial/show	Role	Channel	Notes	Ref.
2015	Office	Ashwin	Star Vijay		
2015	Rettai Vaal Kuruvi	BalaMurugan	Star Vijay		
2016	Raja Rani	Karthik	Star Maa	Telugu series Remake of Saravanan Meenatchi	
2017–2018	Ninaika Therintha Manamae	Aravind	Star Vijay		
2020–2021	Cooku with Comali – Season 2	Contestant	Star Vijay	Second runner-up	

=== Web series ===
Year	Series	Role	OTT platform	Notes	Ref.
2020	Thanthu Vitten Ennai	Vinay	ZEE5	Lead – remake of Honar Soon Mi Hya Gharchi; Dubbed in Telugu as Nenu c/o Nuvvu	
2021	Live Telecast	Ashwin	Disney+ Hotstar		
2022	Meet Cute	Abhi	SonyLIV	Telugu anthology series; segment – Meet the Boy	
2025	Dhoolpet Police Station	Vetrimaaran	Aha	Telugu | Tamil series	

=== Short films ===
Year	Title	Role	Notes	Ref.
2014	3 Santhipugal	Pugazh		
2014	Bullet 350 CC	Munna		
2016	Pradhi	Vijay		
2017	Idar	Shiva		
2018	3 scenes of Love story	Munna		
2019	Blink	Akshay	Won Best Short Film award at SMIFA Shorts	
2019	Cindrella	Abhi		
2020	Kadhal Ondru Kanden	Mathew	Won Best Short Film award at Behindwoods Gold Medals 7	

=== Music videos ===
Year	Title	Music	Vocals	Notes	Ref.
2015	"Cloning Kadhal"	Arun Sundar	Syed Subahan		
2017	"Rhythm of Life"	Vishal Chandrasekhar	Yazin Nizar		
2019	"Shades of Kadhal"	Maran Rajendraan	Sudharshan Ashok		
2021	"Kutty Pattas"	Santhosh Dhayanidhi	Santhosh Dhayanidhi, Rakshita Suresh	Released in Telugu as "Rowdy Pattasu"	
2021	"Criminal Crush"	Godson Rudolph	Anirudh Ravichander, Srinisha Jayaseelan		
2021	"Loner"	Ady Kriz	Anand Aravindakshan		
2021	"Ennam Pol Vazhkai"	Edwin Louis			
2021	"Adipoli"	Siddhu Kumar	Vineeth Sreenivasan, Sivaangi Krishnakumar		
2021	"Yaathi Yaathi"	Abhishek CS	Yazin Nizar, Anuradha Sriram	Released in Telugu as "Sathi Sathi"	
2022	"Baby Nee Sugar"	Osho Venkat	Osho Venkat		
2022	"Vaadi Vaadi"	Harris Jayaraj	Ravi G, Sunitha Sarathy, Samuel Nicholas Jayaraj		
2023	"Makka Makka"	Harris Jayaraj	Bamba Bakya, Satyaprakash	Co-starring with Mugen Rao	
2023	"Vannamayilae"	AK Prriyan	AK Prriyan, Akshaya Shivkumar		
2025	"Adada"	Pragathi Guruprasad	Pragathi Guruprasad		

== Discography ==
=== As voice-over artist ===
Year	Album	Song	Composer	Ref.
2023	11:11	Guru Undu Bhayamillai	Ady Kriz	

== Accolades ==
=== Awards and nominations ===
Year	Award	Category	Work	Result	Ref.
2015	Vijay Television Awards	Favourite Screen Pair (with Pavani Reddy)	Rettai Vaal Kuruvi	Nominated	
2015	Vijay Television Awards	Favourite Find of The Year	Rettai Vaal Kuruvi	Nominated	
2019	SMIFA shorts	Best Actor in Tamil	Blink	Won	
2021	Vijay Television Awards	Trending Pair of the Year (with Sivaangi Krishnakumar)	Cooku with Comali 2	Won	
2021	Behindwoods Gold Icons	Most Popular Male on Reality Television	Cooku with Comali 2	Won	
2026	Exchange4Media E4M	Best Performance – Male (Regional)	Dhoolpet Police Station	Won	

=== Other recognitions ===
Year	Featured by	Listing category	Result	Ref.
2021	Times of India	Chennai Times Most Desirable Man on Television 2020	Won	
2021	Times of India	Chennai Times 30 Most Desirable Men 2020 in Kollywood	Rank 8	
