= Karthik Raj =

Indian actor

- Born: Karthikraj Muthukumar; 21 January 1988 (age 38); Chennai, Tamil Nadu, India
- Education: Gill Adarsh Matriculation Higher Secondary School
- Occupations: Actor; Producer
- Years active: 2011- present
- Website: Karthik Raj on Instagram

Karthik Raj is an Indian Tamil actor who primarily works in television.

He gained recognition through his roles in the television series Office (2013–2015) and Sembaruthi (2017–2020). His work in these productions earned him several awards within the Tamil television industry.

== Early life ==
Born in Chennai, Tamil Nadu, Karthik Raj is the eldest of the two sons to his parents. His father belonged to a wealthy family in Pallathur village near Karaikudi, but had migrated to Chennai at a young age. His father had a 30-year career in the film industry, starting as a production manager under A. L. Srinivasan and later working as an assistant to MGR, ultimately rising to the role of an Executive producer. He was one of the reasons for Karthik's entry into the entertainment industry.

Although Karthik excelled in school, due to his lack of interest in studies, he discontinued his schooling in his 12th grade and enrolled himself in a Diploma of Visual Design. However, due to the change in his family's financial circumstances, he discontinued his tertiary studies and started working in the merchandising department within a garment production house and later as an Assistant Producer in their production office. Whilst looking for a better job, he was recommended by his old neighbour, script writer, S. Ramana Girivasan, to work as an artist coordinator in the show Athu Ithu Ethu on Vijay Television.

== Career ==
Karthik's acting debut came about by chance in his third year of working behind the scenes at Vijay Television; he was offered the role of Karthikeyan by script writer Ramana Girivasan in the Vijay TV series Kana Kaanum Kaalangal Kalooriyin Kadhai (K5). The success of the series saw him landing the role of Karthikeyan in the 2013 series, Office on Vijay Television, where he starred opposite Sruthi Raj.

In 2014, he participated in his first reality show competition, Jodi Number One Season 7 with Nancy Jennifer, but was eliminated midway.

Apart from his on-screen roles, Karthik has also rendered his voice for Vetri, his co-actor in Kana Kanum Kalangal Kallooriyin Kathai, in the short film Yaanum Neeyum released in 2015 for Naalaiya Iyakkunar Season 5.

Taking to the silver screen, he has acted as a lead actor in the movies 465 and Naalu Peruku Nalladhun Edhuvum Thappilla. The release of these films did not garner much attention and had underperformed at the box office.

In 2017, Karthik essayed the lead role of Adhitya in Zee Tamil's daily soap Sembaruthi, alongside newcomer Shabana Shahjahan. The series became a runaway success, captivating audiences across Tamil Nadu and propelling Karthik to new heights of fame.

While filming Sembaruthi, Karthik simultaneously prepared for his miniseries, Mugilan, starring alongside Ramya Pandian, where he would portray the role of a gangster named Mugilan. This preparation, which included gaining weight and growing a longer beard - a change in appearance that drew criticism from the audience who were accustomed to his characterisation of 'Adhitya' - involved a demanding 34-day shoot conducted concurrently with his commitments to Sembaruthi. Mugilan was released as an OTT on the ZEE5 streaming platform on 30 October 2020 to mixed reviews. In December 2020, however, Karthik Raj was replaced in Sembaruthi "due to unforeseen reasons," as quoted in the channel's official statement.

In July 2021, Karthik established his own production company, K Studios and began works on his self-produced, partially crowdfunded film. The pre-production phase commenced in August 2021, with principal photography beginning in November of that year. Titled Black 'n' White in October 2022, the film featured Karthik alongside newcomer Arthika and Shravanya Srinivasan. It was released as a direct-to-television film through Zee Tamil in May 2023.

Following a two-year hiatus, Karthik resumed his television career in 2022, portraying Karthikeyan in the Zee Tamil serial, Karthikai Deepam, reuniting with his Black 'n' White co-star, Arthika. The first season of this series surpassed over 600 episodes, with the second season premiering in late 2024, featuring newcomer Vaishnavi Sadish as his on-screen pair.

== Personal life ==
At the age of 25, Karthik married his girlfriend, Yashi, a Muslim woman, in an interfaith registered marriage. However, they separated a few years later and their divorce proceedings were finalised between 2019 and 2020.

== Filmography ==
=== Film ===
Year	Title	Role	Notes
2017	465	Jai	Credited as Karthikeyan
2017	Naalu Peruku Nalladhuna Edhuvum Thappilla	Anil	Credited as Karthikeyan
2023	Black 'n' White	Rishi	Also producer. Direct-to-television release on Zee Tamil

=== Television series ===
Year	Title	Role	Channel	Notes
2011–2012	Kana Kanum Kalangal Kallooriyin Kathai	Karthik	Star Vijay	Credited as Karthik
2013–2015	Office Season 1 & 2	Karthikeyan a.k.a."Karthik"	Star Vijay	Credited as Karthik
2017–2020	Sembaruthi	Aadhi Kadavur "Adhitya" Adhi	Zee Tamil	
2020	Mugilan	Mugilan	ZEE5	OTT Miniseries
2022–present	Karthigai Deepam	Karthikeyan Arunachalam	Zee Tamil	

=== Television Reality Shows ===
Year	Title	Channel	Notes
2012	Athu Ithu Ethu (Season 1)	Star Vijay	Episode 149
2013	60 Nodi! Are You Ready?	Star Vijay	Grand Finale Episode
2013	Kedi Boys Killadi Girls	Star Vijay	Episode 13; Money Round
2013	Vijay Stars	Star Vijay	Diwali Special
2013–2014	Jodi Number One (Season 7)	Star Vijay	Eliminated in Episode 22
2014	Vijay Stars	Star Vijay	Pongal Special
2014	Connexion (Season 1)	Star Vijay	Episode 12
2014	Vijay Television Awards - Oru Munnottam	Star Vijay	Episode 3 & 4
2014	Star Vijay Nite	Star Vijay	In London
2016	Sirippu Da (Season 2)	Star Vijay	Episode 29 (Ep. 79 overall)
2017	Junior Senior (Season 1)	Zee Tamil	Episode 7
2022	Zee5 Darbar	Zee 5	Episode 11
2023	Zee5 Inbox	Zee 5	Episode 12
2023	Zee5 Rasigan	Zee 5	Black 'n' White Special
2023	Super Jodi	Zee Tamil	Episode 15
2023	Sa Re Ga Ma Pa Seniors (Season 3)	Zee Tamil	Episode 42; Black and White Round

== Awards ==
Year	Award Show	Award	Serial	Result	Notes
2014	Vijayum Neengalum	Made For Each Other 2014	Office		Kadhal Special; With Sruthi Raj
2014	1st Vijay Television Awards	Favourite Onscreen Pair	Office	Won	With Sruthi Raj
2015	2nd Vijay Television Awards	Favourite Onscreen Pair	Office	Won	With Sruthi Raj
2018	Zee Tamil Kudumbam Viruthugal 2018	Favourite Hero	Sembaruthi	Won	
2018	Zee Tamil Kudumbam Viruthugal 2018	Best Actor Male	Sembaruthi	Nominated	
2018	Zee Tamil Kudumbam Viruthugal 2018	Favourite On-Screen Pair	Sembaruthi	Won	With Shabana Shahjahan
2019	Sembaruthi Oru Sathanaipayanam	Certificate of Appreciation	Sembaruthi		For the success of the series
2019	Zee Tamil Kudumbam Viruthugal 2019	Favourite Hero	Sembaruthi	Won	
2019	Zee Tamil Kudumbam Viruthugal 2019	Favourite Pair On-Screen	Sembaruthi	Won	With Shabana Shahjahan
2019	Zee Tamil Kudumbam Viruthugal 2019	Best Actor Male	Sembaruthi	Nominated	
2020	Zee Tamil Kudumbam Virudhugal 2020	Favourite Hero	Sembaruthi	Won	
2020	Zee Tamil Kudumbam Virudhugal 2020	Best Actor Male	Sembaruthi	Nominated	
2020	Zee Tamil Kudumbam Virudhugal 2020	Favourite Pair On-Screen	Sembaruthi	Won	With Shabana Shahjahan
2020	Zee Tamil Kudumbam Virudhugal 2020	Best Pair On-Screen	Sembaruthi	Nominated	With Shabana Shahjahan
2022	Zee Tamil Kudumbam Viruthugal 2022	Makkalin Nayagan			Special Jury Award
2023	Zee Tamil Golden Moments Awards 2023	Best Amma Pasam	Karthigai Deepam	Won	With Meera Krishna
2023	Zee Tamil Kudumbam Viruthugal 2023	Best Actor Male	Karthigai Deepam	Nominated	
2023	Zee Tamil Kudumbam Viruthugal 2023	Favourite Hero	Karthigai Deepam	Won	
2023	Zee Tamil Kudumbam Viruthugal 2023	Favourite On-Screen Pair	Karthigai Deepam	Won	With Arthika
2023	Zee Tamil Kudumbam Viruthugal 2023	Best On-Screen Pair	Karthigai Deepam	Nominated	With Arthika
2024	Zee Tamil Golden Moments Awards 2024	Best Amma Pasam	Karthigai Deepam	Won	With Meera Krishna
2024	Zee Tamil Golden Moments Awards 2024	Best Action	Karthigai Deepam	Nominated	
2024	Zee Tamil Golden Moments Awards 2024	Best Mass Buildup	Karthigai Deepam	Won	
2024	Vikatan Tele Awards 2023	Favourite Actor	Karthigai Deepam	Won	Awarded July 2024
2024	Zee Tamil Kudumba Viruthugal 2024	Best Actor	Karthigai Deepam	Nominated	
2024	Zee Tamil Kudumba Viruthugal 2024	Favourite Actor Male	Karthigai Deepam	Won	
2024	Zee Tamil Kudumba Viruthugal 2024	Favourite Pair	Karthigai Deepam	Nominated	With Arthika
