= Adiyae =

- Theatrical release poster
- Directed by: Vignesh Karthick
- Screenplay by: Vignesh Karthick; Kishore Sankar
- Produced by: Prabha Premkumar
- Starring: G. V. Prakash Kumar; Gouri G. Kishan
- Cinematography: Gokul Benoy
- Edited by: Muthayan U
- Music by: Justin Prabhakaran
- Production companies: Maali & Manvi Movie Makers
- Release date: 25 August 2023
- Running time: 156 minutes
- Country: India
- Language: Tamil

Adiyae (transl. Hey, girl!) is a 2023 Indian Tamil-language science fiction romantic comedy film written and directed by Vignesh Karthick. The film stars G. V. Prakash Kumar and Gouri G. Kishan with Venkat Prabhu, Mirchi Vijay, Madumkesh and others in supporting roles. The music was composed by Justin Prabhakaran, with cinematography done by Gokul Benoy. The title of the film is taken from the song "Adiye" from the G. V. Prakash Kumar-starrer Bachelor.

The film was released theatrically on 25 August 2023 and received positive reviews from critics and audiences.

== Plot ==
Jeeva has been in love with Senthaazhini since school days. Years later, Senthaazhini is a renowned singer, while Jeeva is an ordinary man who is still in love with Senthaazhini but has not disclosed it yet. One day he gets transported to a parallel universe, where he is an accomplished musician and Senthaazhini is his wife. His trip to the parallel universe reverts after a predetermined period. Jeeva goes back to the parallel universe to be with Senthaazhini but eventually comes back to his home universe. How Jeeva resolves his love story in reality forms the rest of the story.

== Cast ==
- G. V. Prakash Kumar as Jeeva
  - Prakash Kumar also portrays Arjun Prabhakaran, a parallel universe variant
- Gouri G. Kishan as Senthaazhini
- Venkat Prabhu in a dual role as
  - Scientist GK
  - Gautham Vasudev Menon (parallel universe)
- Mirchi Vijay as Wasim Akram
  - as Waqar Younis (parallel universe)
- Madumkesh as Michael
- Swetha Venugopal as Sandhya
- Vignesh Karthick in a cameo appearance as Vijay in Gautham Vasudev Menon's Yohan: Adhyayam Ondru (parallel universe)

== Production ==
The film was directed by Vignesh Karthick, who earlier directed the films Yenda Thalaiyila Yenna Vekkala and Thittam Irandu. The film was produced by Prabha Premkumar under the banner of Maali & Manvi Movie Makers. The cinematography was by cinematographer Gokul Benoy. The film's editing was handled by Muthayan U. The motion poster for the film was released on 26 April 2023. The trailer was released on 8 August 2023.

== Soundtrack ==
The music was composed by Justin Prabhakaran.

Adiyae

Soundtrack album by Justin Prabhakaran
- Released: 2023
- Recorded: 2023
- Genre: Feature film soundtrack
- Length: 21:44
- Language: Tamil
- Label: Think Music
- Producer: Justin Prabhakaran

Justin Prabhakaran chronology
Farhana (2023)	Adiyae (2023)	Irugapatru (2023)
External audio
- Adiyae – Jukebox on YouTube

Track listing
No.	Title	Lyrics	Singer(s)	Length
1.	"Vaa Senthaazhini"	Bhagavathy P. K.	Sid Sriram	4:12
2.	"Mudhal Kaadhal"	Bhagavathy P. K.	Yuvan Shankar Raja	3:50
3.	"Mutta Cutie"	Maathevan	Anthony Daasan	4:29
4.	"Ullukulla Theekaadu"	Maathevan	Romy, Padmaja Srinivasan	3:31
5.	"Multiverse of Adiyae"	MC Vickey	Justin Prabhakaran, MC Vickey	1:24
6.	"Kaadhale"	Bagavathy P. K.	M. S. Krsna, Kapil Kapilan	4:18
Total length:				21:44

== Critical reception ==
Adiyae received positive reviews from critics, praising the lead cast's performance (especially Prakash, Gouri and Venkat's), narration, screenplay and Justin's music.

Logesh Balachandran of The Times of India gave the film 3 out of 5 and wrote "While Adiyae may share some traits with time travel films of the past, the film's engaging narrative, strong performances, and skillful incorporation of alternate reality elements make it a worthwhile watch." Virakesari gave the film 2.5 out of 5 and wrote that it is commendable that the director has cleverly described the alternate reality through the character of Venkat Prabhu at a time when the audience is confused about the story of the film. Pachi Avudayappan of ABP Nadu gave the film 3 out of 5 and wrote that even if a little is not understood, the whole picture will be confused. Similarly, the alternating scenes make the audience question. Ananda Vikatan gave the film a mixed review.
