= Lakshmi (2024 TV series) =

- Genre: Drama
- Written by: K.Anand Samyuktha; Rathi Bala (dialogues)
- Directed by: Sai Marutthu; K.Shiva
- Starring: Shruthi Raj; SSR Aaryann
- Theme music composer: Kiran
- Opening theme: "Penne Pinmaykkoru"; Saindhavi Prakash (Vocals)
- Country of origin: India
- Original language: Tamil
- No. of seasons: 1
- No. of episodes: 700+

Production
- Producer: Sudhakar Pallamala
- Production location: Tamil Nadu
- Cinematography: Neelamegam
- Editors: Mathi YiD; Subash Bagavathiappan; T.A.Gopinath
- Camera setup: Multi-camera
- Running time: Approx.20–22 minutes per episode
- Production companies: Sun Entertainment; AR Film World

Original release
- Network: Sun TV
- Release: 18 March 2024 - present

Lakshmi is a 2024 Indian television Tamil-language The series premiered on 18 March 2024 airing from Monday to Saturday on Sun TV and is also available on the digital platform Sun NXT. It stars Shruthi Raj and SSR Aaryann.

The show focuses on ambitious Mahalakshmi, who is determined to make a name for herself. It is produced by AR Film World with Sun Entertainment, written by K.Anand Samyuktha and Rathi Bala and directed by K.Shiva.

== Cast ==
=== Main ===
- Sruthi Raj as Mahalakshmi Selvam alias Maha: Jeeva's younger sister; elder sister of Kokila and Akila; Selvam's wife
- Sanjeev Venkat / SSR Aaryann as Selvam Murugan: Maha's husband; elder brother of Vennila, Kathir and Divya

=== Supporting ===
- Arthika as Maya: Selvam's friend
- Rindhya as Vennilla Jeeva: eldest sister Selvam,Kathir and Divya; Jeeva 's wife
- Nithya Ravindar as Gowri Murugan: mother of Vennila, Selvam, Kathir and Divya
- Lokesh Baskaran as Aadesh: Maha's college friend
- Nimish Sagar / Hari Rudran as Ashwin Rajashekhar: Mahalakshmi's arch business enemy
- Senthilnathan as Kambimurugan alias Murugan: father of Vennila, Selvam, Kathir and Divya
- Maheswari Yayathiraj as Divya Murugan: younger sister of Vennilla, Selvam and Kathir
- Baby Keerthana as Mathi Jeeva: Jeeva and Vennilla's daughter
- Vigneshwaran as Kathir Murugan alias Kathirvelu: Akila's husband; younger brother of Vennilla, Selvam and Divya
- Meena Vemuri as Meenakshi: mother of Jeeva, Maha, Kokila and Akila
- Keerthi Vijay as Kokila: sister of Jeeva, Maha, Akila
- Neha Menon as Akila Kathir: sister of Jeeva, Maha, Kokila and Kathir's wife
- Poraali Dileepan as Jeeva: Vennila's husband; brother of Maha, Kokila, Akila and Mathi's father
- Sruthi Shanmuga Priya as Viji: Maha's best friend
- Paramesh Babu as Babu: Selvam's best friend
- Bhagyalakshmi as Mangalama alias Mangalam: Meenakshi's friend
- Anu Neela as Sangeetha Babu: Babu's wife

=== Special Appearance ===
- Iru Malargal serial family members in Mahasangamam
- Vasu Vikram as Aghora Kaalagandan (Lakshmi & Iru Malargal Mahasangamam)

== Production ==
=== Casting ===
Actress Shruthi Raj was cast in the female lead role of Mahalakshmi, marking her return after Thalattu. Actor Sanjeev Venkat was cast in the male lead role of Selvam. He was replaced by actor SSR Aryan Actress Sruthi Shanmuga Priya was cast as Viji.

=== Release ===
The first promo was released on 1 March 2024 featuring all of the main cast. The show debuted on Sun TV on 18 March 2023, taking Aruvi's time slot.

== Soundtrack ==
Playback and Carnatic singer, Saindhavi Prakash, sang the opening theme song track, in her second collaboration with Shruthi Raj, after singing the opening theme of the serial Thalattu.

== Adaptations ==
Language	Title	Original release	Network(s)	Last aired	Notes	Ref.
Telugu	Sri Hari Kalyanam	22 September 2025	Sun Gemini	Ongoing	Remake	
Kannada	Mahalakshmi Maduve	1 June 2026	Sun Udaya	Ongoing	Remake	
