= Hot Spot 2 Much =

2026 Indian film

- Theatrical release poster
- Directed by: Vignesh Karthick
- Written by: Vignesh Karthick
- Produced by: K. J. Balamanimarbhan; Aneel K. Reddy
- Starring: Priya Bhavani Shankar; M. S. Bhaskar; Thambi Ramaiah; Rakshan; Ashwin Kumar; Bhavani Sre
- Cinematography: Jagadeesh Ravi; Joseph Paul
- Edited by: Muthayan U
- Music by: Satish Raghunathan
- Production companies: KJB Talkies; Ants to Elephants
- Distributed by: Vishnu Vishal Studioz
- Release date: 23 January 2026
- Country: India
- Language: Tamil

Hot Spot 2 Much is a 2026 Indian Tamil-language anthology film directed by Vignesh Karthick, starring Priya Bhavani Shankar, M. S. Bhaskar, Thambi Ramaiah, Rakshan, Ashwin Kumar, Aadhitya Baaskar, Bhavani Sre, Brigida Saga, and Sanjana Tiwari. It is a spiritual successor to the 2024 film Hot Spot. The film is jointly produced by K. J. Balamanimarbhan and Aneel K. Reddy under their KJB Talkies and Ants to Elephants banner and presented by Vishnu Vishal under his Vishnu Vishal Studioz banner.

The technical team consists of cinematography by Jagadeesh Ravi and Joseph Paul, editing by Muthayan U, and music by Satish Raghunathan. Hot Spot 2 Much was released in theatres on 23 January 2026 to positive reviews from critics and was a box office success.

== Plot ==
Priya Bhavani Shankar tells three stories to a producer. She employs the franchise's characteristic sarcasm, which sometimes veers into condescension. The storytelling is simplistic and reductive. But this simplicity works wonderfully in the first story, which tackles the toxic culture of fans.

In the second story, Thambi Ramaiah plays a loving father who struggles to accept his daughter's modern values. The director argues that while the daughter (Sanjana Tiwari) is right to choose to wear modern clothes as a form of self-expression, it is equally legitimate for the father to wear dirty and torn clothes to her birthday party to highlight the irony of the situation.

The third short story presents the current state of relationships as a dystopian nightmare, its protagonist projecting himself into a distant and idyllic future (thanks to a time machine) to meet a young girl from a generation that has "fortunately" rediscovered contact with "true love".

== Cast ==
Dear Fan	Black & White	Yours Lovingly, Love	The Narration
M. S. Bhaskar as Monologue; Rakshan as James; Aadhitya Baaskar as Sathya; Kavitha Bharathi; Adithya Kathir as himself	Thambi Ramaiah as Sharmitha's father; Sanjana Tiwari as Sharmitha	Ashwin Kumar as Yugan; Bhavani Sre as Nithya	Priya Bhavani Shankar as Shilpa; Brigida Saga as Madhumitha; Vignesh Karthick as Mohammad Sherief; K. J. Balamanimarbhan as himself

== Release ==
=== Theatrical ===
Hot Spot 2 Much was released in theatres on 23 January 2026.

=== Home media ===
Hot Spot 2 Much began streaming on Amazon Prime Video, Aha, Simply South, Shortflix, AP International South Cinema and Lionsgate Play from 20 February 2026.

== Reception ==
Abhinav Subramanian of The Times of India gave 3 out of 5 stars and wrote "The film does feel like it's lecturing you at times. Monologues explaining each story's thesis feel like the director doesn't trust us to connect the dots ourselves. The first two segments rely on mirror-image reversals that grow formulaic." Prashanth Vallavan of Cinema Express gave 2.5 out of 5 stars and wrote "Essentially a collection of director Vignesh Karthick's opinions on several issues, ranging from fan wars, to dress politics, and contemporary relationships, the film might leave you disapproving of its wild takes but it never leaves you indifferent." Anusha Sundar of OTTPlay gave 2 out of 5 stars and wrote "Hot Spot 2 is an attempt into telling stories about socially constructed values. But it only settles for shock values, and surface level understanding. Although progressiveness peeks in here and there, Hot Spot 2 doesn’t have enough to substantiate its gimmicked making."
