= Others (film) =

Indian Tamil-language action thriller film

- Theatrical release poster
- Directed by: Abin Hariharan
- Written by: Abin Hariharan
- Produced by: Murali
- Starring: Aditya Madhavan; Gouri G. Kishan; Anju Kurian
- Cinematography: Aravinnd Singh
- Edited by: R. Ramar
- Music by: Ghibran Vaibodha
- Production company: Grand Pictures
- Release date: 7 November 2025
- Running time: 130 minutes
- Country: India
- Language: Tamil

Others is a 2025 Indian Tamil-language action thriller film written and directed by Abin Hariharan. Produced by Grand Pictures, the film features debutant Aditya Madhavan, Gouri G. Kishan and Anju Kurian in the lead roles alongside Munishkanth, Hareesh Peradi, R. Sundarrajan, Nandu Jagan, Maala Parvathi, and Vinod Sagar in supporting roles.

The film was released in theatres on 7 November 2025.

== Premise ==
Others begins with a series of tragic and mysterious incidents involving IVF-born infants afflicted with severe, unexplained conditions. What seems like isolated medical mishaps soon unravels into a sinister conspiracy.

== Cast ==
- Aditya Madhavan as ACP Madhav
- Gouri G. Kishan as Dr. Madhu
- Anju Kurian as Inspector Beena
- Munishkanth as Sub-inspector Gajendran
- R. Sundarrajan as Kasinathan
- Hareesh Peradi as Doctor of Medicine
- Vinod Sagar as Mukesh
- Sumesh Moor as Vedha (Vedhika)
- Vaiyapuri as Ganesan
- Jagan as Maari
- Saravana Subbiah as Anbazhagan
- Bayilvan Ranganathan as Press Reporter
- Shyam Krishnan as Charles
- TSR Srinivasan as Thanatopractor
- Maala Parvathi as Mother

== Production ==
The film is written and directed by Abin Hariharan and produced by Grand Pictures, starring debutant and Gouri G. Kishan, who was last seen in Sahasam (2025) in the lead roles, alongside Anju Kurian in an important role. The technical team consists of Aravinnd Singh as the cinematographer, R. Ramar as the editor, and music composed by Ghibran Vaibodha.

== Music ==
Others

Soundtrack album by Ghibran Vaibodha
- Genre: Feature film soundtrack
- Language: Tamil
- Producer: Ghibran Vaibodha

Ghibran Vaibodha chronology
Aaryan (2025)	Others (2025)	BP 180 (2025)

Singles from Others
- 1. "Oru Paarvai Paarthavanae" Released: 24 October 2025

The first video single titled "Oru Paarvai Paarthavanae" was released on 24 October 2025.

Track listing
No.	Title	Lyrics	Singer(s)	Length
1.	"Oru Paarvai Paarthavanae"	Mohan Rajan	Ghibran Vaibodha, Shakthisree Gopalan, Namitha Babu

== Release ==
Others released in theatres on 7 November 2025.

== Reception ==
Abhinav Subramanian of The Times of India gave 3/5 stars and wrote "Where Others loses steam is in its inability to generate real grip despite having the pieces in place. The investigation unfolds in a straight line, revealing clues at regular intervals, but it never builds the kind of mounting dread that makes thrillers compulsive. [...] The film works best when you focus on where it's going rather than how it gets there."

Avinash Ramachandran of Cinema Express gave 1.5/5 stars and wrote "Apart from focus and finesse, Others also needed a fair share of restraint because it is so all over the place that it takes away even the slightest of goodwill the film generated till the final act." Maalai Malar gave 3/5 stars and Dinamalar gave 2.75/5 stars. The film was also reviewed by Vikatan and Hindu Tamil Thisai.
