= The Mystery of Moksha Island =

- Promotional release poster
- Genre: Thriller
- Written by: Sanjeev Roy; Prasanth Varma
- Directed by: Anish Kuruvilla
- Starring: Tejaswi Madivada; Nandu; Pavani Reddy; Ashutosh Rana; Priya Anand; Sonia Agarwal; Vijay Adhiraj
- Music by: Shakthikanth Karthick
- Country of origin: India
- Original language: Telugu
- No. of episodes: 8

Production
- Executive producers: Harish Katta; Kolla Praveen
- Producers: Gopichand Achanta; Ram Achanta
- Production location: Goa
- Cinematography: Naveen Yadav
- Editors: Umair Hasan; Faiz Rai
- Camera setup: Multi-camera
- Running time: 22-31 mins
- Production company: 14 Reels Entertainment

Original release
- Network: Disney+ Hotstar
- Release: 20 September 2024

The Mystery Of Moksha Island is a 2024 Indian Telugu-language thriller streaming television series directed by Anish Kuruvilla and written by Sanjeev Roy and Prasanth Varma. Produced under 14 Reels Entertainment, it stars Tejaswi Madivada, Nandu, Pavani Reddy, Ashutosh Rana and Priya Anand. The series premiered on Disney+ Hotstar on 20 September 2024.

== Cast ==
- Ashutosh Rana as Viswak Sen
- Nandu as Vikram "Vicky"
- Priya Anand as Jhansi
- Tejaswi Madivada as Isha
- Akshara Gowda as Maya
- Aadarsh Balakrishna as Haricharan
- Bhanu Chander as Arun
- Sudha as Meena
- Raj Tirandasu as Harsha
- Pavani Reddy as Madhavi
- Roshni Prakash as Nikhila
- Roshan Kanakala as Akash
- Deepak Shetty as Mustafa
- Nayan Sarika
- Khayyum
- Anuraga Ravali
- Vijay Adhiraj as Subbu

== Episodes ==
=== Season 1 (20-09-2024) ===
1. The invitation

2. Island recci

3. Family matters

4. Grandma tales

5. Lab rats

6. No one is safe here

7. Science matters

8. Mind bending

== Production ==
The series was announced on Disney+ Hotstar. The trailer of the series was released on 6 September 2024.
