= Office (TV series) =

Indian Tamil-language soap opera

- Promotional image for Office
- Genre: Comedy
- Written by: S. Ramana Girivasan
- Directed by: Ram Vinayak
- Starring: Karthik Raj; Shruthi Raj; Vishnu; Madhumila; Uday Mahesh
- Narrated by: Venkatachalam A
- Theme music composer: Ilayavan
- Composer: Ilayavan
- Country of origin: India
- Original language: Tamil
- No. of seasons: 2
- No. of episodes: 562

Production
- Producer: K. J. Ganesh
- Editor: S.Mathan kumar
- Camera setup: Multi-camera
- Running time: approx. 20-22 minutes per episode
- Production company: Venus Infotainment

Original release
- Network: STAR Vijay
- Release: 11 March 2013 – 5 June 2015

Office is a 2013 Indian Tamil-language workplace comedy television series starring Karthik Raj, Shruthi Raj, Vishnu, Madhumila, Udhayabhanu Maheswaran, Suzane George, Sidharth and Anbazhagan. The series was directed by Ram Vinayak and produced by K. J. Ganesh.

It aired on STAR Vijay from 11 March 2013 to 5 June 2015 Monday through Friday at 10:00PM (IST). It was the first full workplace drama in the Tamil television industry. This programs was re-aired on Shakthi TV.

== Summary ==
Office deals with the story and happenings of employees at Netech Solutions, an IT company. For Karthick, Vishnu, Raji, and Lakshmi, their office is a place where friendships and relationships bloom, even as they struggle to hold it together.

== Seasons overview ==
Season	Episodes	Originally aired (Singapore dates)		Time
Season	Episodes	First aired	Last aired	Time
1	396	11 March 2013	1 October 2014	Monday - Friday; 7.30PM (IST) & 10:00PM (IST)
2	166	6 October 2014	5 June 2015	Monday - Friday; 10:00PM (IST)

== Cast ==
=== Season 1 ===
- Karthik Raj as Karthikeyan "Karthik"
- Shruthi Raj as Rajalakshmi "Raji"
- Vishnu as Vishnuvardhan "Vishnu"
- Uday Mahesh as Vishwanathan
- Madhumila as Lakshmi
- Suzane George as Suzane
- Madhan Pandian as Madhan
- Vyshali Krishnan as Shwetha
- Gemini Mani as Mohan
- Anbazhagan "Anbu" as Anbu
- Azhagappan as Kattadurai "Katta"
- Raghavendran as Puli
- Mahalakshmi as Angel
- Jeevitha as Soundarya
- R. Raveendran (R. Ravi/Jeeva Ravi) as Karthikeyan's father
- Rekha Suresh as Karthikeyan's mother
- Isvar as Gautham Victor
- David Solomon Raja as David
- Akalya Venkatesan as Sumanthi

=== Season 2 ===
- Karthik Raj as Karthikeyan
- Shruthi Raj as Rajalakshmi
- Vishnu as Vishnuvardhan
- Uday Mahesh as Vishwanathan
- Preethi Kumar as Manimegalai
- Sidharth kumaran as Kamal
- Anbazhagan as Anbu
- Azhagappan as Katta
- Raghavendra as Puli
- Pavithra Janani as Vanitha
- Anu Sulash as Madhavi
- Hema Rajkumar as Radhika
- R. Raveendran (R. Ravi/Jeeva Ravi) as Karthikeyan's father
- Rekha Suresh as Karthikeyan's mother
- Ashwin Kumar Lakshmikanthan as Ashwin
- Jacquline Lydia as Jacqueline

== Awards and nominations ==
Year	Award	Category	Recipient	Role	Result
2014
2014	Vijay Television Awards	Favourite Find	Madhumila	Mahalakshmi	Won
2014	Vijay Television Awards	Favourite Find	Vishnu	Vishnu	Nominated
2014	Vijay Television Awards	Favourite Comedian Fiction	Vishnu	Vishnu	Won
2014	Vijay Television Awards	Favourite Comedian Fiction	Anbazhagan	Anbu	Nominated
2014	Vijay Television Awards	Favourite Actor Male	Karthik Raj	Karthikeyan	Nominated
2014	Vijay Television Awards	Favourite Actor Female	Shruthi Raj	Rajalakshmi	Nominated
2014	Vijay Television Awards	Favourite Screen Pair	Karthik Raj & Shruthi Raj	Karthik & Raji	Won
2014	Vijay Television Awards	Favourite Fiction Series	Office		Nominated
2014	Vijay Television Awards	Favourite Supporting Actor Male	Uday Mahesh	Vishwanathan	Won
2014	Vijay Television Awards	Favourite Supporting Actor Female	Suzane George	Suzane	Nominated
2015	Vijay Television Awards	Favourite Actor Male	Karthik Raj	Karthikeyan	Nominated
2015	Vijay Television Awards	Favourite Actor Female	Shruthi Raj	Rajalakshmi	Nominated
2015	Vijay Television Awards	Favourite Screen Pair	Karthik Raj & Shruthi Raj	Karthik & Raji	Won
2015	Vijay Television Awards	Favourite Fiction Series	Office		Nominated
2015	Vijay Television Awards	Favourite Supporting Actor Female	Hema	Radhika	Nominated
