= Rasaathi =

2019 Tamil-language TV series

- Genre: Soap opera
- Directed by: Raj Kapoor (Episode 1–28); B.Babusivan (Episode 28–110); A. Jawahar (Episode 111–160)
- Starring: Pavani Reddy; Devayani; Baladithya; Vichithra
- Country of origin: India
- Original language: Tamil
- No. of seasons: 1
- No. of episodes: 160

Production
- Executive producer: Anbuselvan Nandhini
- Producer: A.Anburaja
- Camera setup: Multi-camera
- Running time: 20-22 minutes
- Production companies: Sun Entertainment; A R Film World

Original release
- Network: Sun TV
- Release: 23 September 2019 – 3 April 2020

Rasaathi is a 2019–2020 Tamil-language television series starring Pavani Reddy in the title role. Whilst Devayani, Baladitya and Vichithra in the supporting roles and was directed by Jawahar. The show premiered on 23 September 2019 in Sun TV and ended on 3 April 2020 due to COVID-19 pandemic.

== Cast ==
=== Main ===
- Pavani Reddy / Debjani modak as Raasathi
- Devayani as Illavarasi Soundravalli
- Aditya as Rajadurai / Pandian
- Vichithra as Chinthamani

=== Recurring ===
- Senthil as Alagarswamy (Rasaathi's uncle)
- Sulakshana as Alamelu (Pandian's adoptive mother)
- Keerthi Jai Dhanush as Kayal Shiva (Chintamani's daughter)
- Thennavan and Ramesh Pandit as Rasappan: Rasaathi's stepbrother
- Vijayakumar as Shanmugasundaram: Rasaathi and Rasappan's father (Died in serial)
- Nithya Ravindran as Saraswathi: Shanmugasundaram's first wife (Rasathi's mother)
- Reena as Shanmugasundaram's second wife (Rasappan's mother)
- Manoj Kumar as Chintamani's brother (Pandian's adoptive father)
- Sivan Sreenivasan as Tharmahartha
- Meena Vemuri as Sudamani (Chinthamani's sister)
- Sabari as Shiva (Alagarswamy's son, Kayal's husband)
- Subalakshmi Rangan as Menaka Madhavan (Sudamani's daughter, Madhavan's wife)
- Rohith as Santhosh
- Usha Sai as Kalyani
- Mahesh Subramaniam as Madhavan (Soundaravalli's 2nd brother)
- Pollachi Babu as Anjoor
