= Mugilan =

2020 Indian crime thriller miniseries

- Release poster
- Genre: Crime; Thriller
- Written by: Sri Ram Ram
- Directed by: Sri Ram Ram
- Starring: Karthik Raj; Ramya Pandian
- Theme music composer: Vishal Chandrasekhar
- Country of origin: India
- Original language: Tamil
- No. of seasons: 1
- No. of episodes: 8 (list of episodes)

Production
- Producers: Sundaram Bala; Dinesh Ramana
- Cinematography: Farook Basha
- Editor: Tamil Arasan
- Camera setup: Multi-camera
- Running time: 30 mins
- Production company: Insideus Media

Original release
- Network: ZEE5
- Release: 30 October 2020

Mugilan is a 2020 Indian Tamil-language crime thriller miniseries, produced as an Original for ZEE5, written and directed by Sri Ram Ram and edited by Tamil Arasan. It stars Karthik Raj and Ramya Pandian in the main lead roles.

The miniseries is set in the backdrop of 1970s era and it is based on how socio political elements eventually triggered to a rise of a gangster in Tamil Nadu. It was released on 30 October 2020.

== Premise ==
The series depicts socio-political events that led to the rise of one of the most dreaded gangsters of Kanchipuram district in Tamil Nadu in the 1970s called Mugilan.

== Cast ==
- Karthik Raj as Mugilan
- Ramya Pandian as Maheshwari
- Raj Kumar manthirapandi as Rajendran
- Asha Rathi as Malar Mugilan's daughter
- Aadukalam Naren as Mudaliyar
- Gayatri Rema as Devi
- Robert as Saravanan
- Risha Jacobs as Saravanan's girlfriend
- Junior Balaiah as Dhashwanth

== Production ==
Karthik Raj was roped into play the male lead role in the series while he was busy with shooting for Zee Tamil television soap opera Sembaruthi. Ramya Pandian was roped into play the main female lead and made her digital debut through the project.

== Release ==
This is the first web series to be announced by the ZEE5 platform for the release after the COVID-19 pandemic lockdown in India. It was released through ZEE5 on 30 October 2020.

== Episodes ==
No. overall	No. in season	Title	Directed by	Written by	Original release date
1	1	"The First Strike"	Sri Ram Ram	Sri Ram Ram	30 October 2020
2	2	"Deceit"	Sri Ram Ram	Sri Ram Ram	30 October 2020
3	3	"Lost in love"	Sri Ram Ram	Sri Ram Ram	30 October 2020
4	4	"The Rise of the Underdog"	Sri Ram Ram	Sri Ram Ram	30 October 2020
5	5	"Power Play"	Sri Ram Ram	Sri Ram Ram	30 October 2020
6	6	"Red Eagles"	Sri Ram Ram	Sri Ram Ram	30 October 2020
7	7	"Allegiance and Betrayal"	Sri Ram Ram	Sri Ram Ram	30 October 2020
8	8	"Checkmate"	Sri Ram Ram	Sri Ram Ram	30 October 2020

== Reception ==
Navein Darshan from Cinemaexpress wrote that it is "an unengaging gangster drama that fails due to lack of clarity in writing and underwhelming performances" but appreciated "the landscapes."
