= Azhagu (TV series) =

Indian Tamil-language soap opera

- Final logo of Azhagu
- Genre: Soap opera
- Written by: S. Marthu Shankar; Thangavel
- Screenplay by: C. U. Muthuselvan; Ashok Kumar; Kumareshan; S. Muralidharan
- Directed by: Ravi V.C. (ep. 1–48); O.N. Rathnam (ep. 49–393); N. Sundhareshwaran (ep. 394–440); K. Venpa Kadhiresan (ep. 441–474); P. Selvam (ep. 475–719)
- Creative director: V. Murali Raaman
- Starring: Niranjan BS: Revathi; Sangeetha Sai; Shruthi Raj; Thalaivasal Vijay
- Theme music composer: Vishal; Aditya (title song); Kiran (background score)
- Opening theme: Azhagamma; S. P. Balasubrahmanyam (vocals); Badri Venkatesh (lyrics)
- Country of origin: India
- Original language: Tamil
- No. of seasons: 2
- No. of episodes: 719

Production
- Producer: Vaidehi Ramamurthy
- Cinematography: Azhagiya Manavaiyan; P. Chella Pandiyan
- Editors: M.S. Thiyagarajan; R. P. Manikandan; K. Bharath Kumar
- Camera setup: Multi-camera
- Running time: 20-21 minutes
- Production company: Vision Time India Pvt Ltd

Original release
- Network: Sun TV
- Release: 20 November 2017 – 3 April 2020

Azhagu (Beauty) is a 2017 Indian Tamil-language soap opera starring Niranjan BS, Shruthi Raj, Sangeetha Sai, Revathi, and Thalaivasal Vijay. The show premiered on 20 November 2017, replacing the serial Vamsam, and ended on 3 April 2020 due to COVID-19 pandemic. It was subsequently replaced by the serial Abhiyum Naanum. The show was produced by Vision Time India Pvt Ltd on Sun TV.

== Synopsis ==
=== Season-1 ===
The story is about the nuances of love between husband Palaniswamy and his wife Azhagu, even though they have been married for decades, and have successful and robust individual personas.

Azhagu is the one who finds amicable solutions to all family problems and issues while struggling to help her

five children Aishwarya and Ravi, Mahesh, Thiruna and Kavya survive peacefully.

=== Season-2 ===
Ganesh's wife Aishwarya becomes an ideal daughter in law of and Ravi's wife Sudha becomes an ideal daughter in law of the family while Mahesh's wife Poorna becomes an ideal daughter in law of, Thiruna's wife Nivi becomes an ideal daughter in law of and Madhan's wife Kavya becomes an ideal daughter in law of, hatches and various plots against the family. Soon, it is revealed that Poorna and Sudha are Sakundala's long lost daughters. Despite, Poorna turns eviler, and she creates various problems.

== Cast ==
=== Main ===
- Revathi as Azhagammai "Azhagu" Palaniswamy – Palaniswamy's wife
- Thalaivasal Vijay as Palaniswamy "Palani" – Azhagammai's husband
- Sangeetha Sai as Poorna Mahesh – Mahesh's wife; Sudha and Madhan's sister; main antagonist
- Shruthi Raj as Sudha Ravi – Ravi's wife; Poorna and Madhan's sister

=== Supporting ===
==== Palaniswamy family ====
- Lokesh Bhaskaran / Vibhu Raman as Ravikumar "Ravi" Palaniswamy – Azhagu and Palani's elder son; Sudha's husband
- Manikanda Rajesh as Maheshkumar "Mahesh" Palaniswamy – Azhagu and Palani's second son; Poorna's husband
- Niranjan B. S. / Avinash Ashok as Thirunavukkarasu "Thiruna" Palaniswamy – Azhagu and Palani's younger son; Nivi's husband and Archana's former husband
- Farina Azad / Akshitha Bopaiah / Vaishnavi Arulmozhi as Nivedhitha "Nivi" Thiruna – Thiruna's wife
- Mithra Kurian / Nithya Das / Niranjani Ashok as Aishwarya "Aishu" Ganeshkumar – Azhagu and Palani's eldest daughter; Ganesh's wife
- Sahana Sheddy as Kavya Madhankumar – Azhagu and Palani's youngest daughter; Madhan's wife
- Aishwarya Bhaskaran as Vasantha – Palani's younger sister; Poorna's adoptive mother

==== Aravind family ====
- Gayatri Jayaraman as Sakuntala Devi Aravind – Sudha, Poorna and Madhan's mother
- Muralidhar Raj as Aravind – Sudha, Poorna and Madhan's father
- Vigneshwaran as Madhankumar "Madhan" Aravind – Kavya's husband
- Shanthi Williams as Aravind and Shailaja's mother
- Sai Madhavi as Shailaja – Aravind's sister
- Joker Tulasi as Tulasi – Sakuntala Devi's assistant

==== Sethuraman family ====
- Jayaraman Mohan as Ganeshkumar "Ganesh" Sethuraman – Aishwarya's husband
- Poovilangu Mohan as Sethuraman – Ganesh, Sathya and Manisha's father
- Naresh Eswar as Sathyamurthy "Sathya" Sethuraman – Ganesh's younger brother
- VJ Mounika as Manisha Sethuraman – Ganesh's younger sister
- B. Kannan as Kannan – Sethuraman's elder brother
- Gopalakrishnan Krishnamoorthy as Gopal – Sethuraman's younger brother

==== Sundaram family ====
- V. M. Rajesh Kanna as Sundaralingam "Sundaram" – Archana and Priya's father
- Veena Venkatesh as Maheshwari Sundaram – Archana and Priya's mother
- Sonu Satheesh Kumar as Priya Sundaram – Archana's elder sister
- Aiswarya Devi as Archana Sundaram – Thiruna's former wife

==== Manimaran family ====
- Vasu Vikram as Manimaran – Azhagu's elder brother
- Rajyalakshmi as Devi Manimaran – Manimaran's wife
- Navindhar as Mahendran Manimaran – Manimaran's son

==== Nivedhitha's family ====
- Ramya Ramakrishna as Rathi Venkat – Nivi's sister
- Fawaz Zayani as Venkatakrishnan "Venkat" – Nivi's uncle

==== Surender's family ====
- Ashwin as Surender – Sudha's first husband; deceased
- Arunkumar Padmanabhan as Bhaskar – Surender's younger brother
- Uma Rani as Sornam – Surender and Bhaskar's mother

==== Other recurring characters ====
- Sudha as Rangamma – Sudha's adoptive mother
- Gayathri Raj as Malliga – main antagonist
- Divya as Anitha – Ganesh's former lover
- Kousalya Senthamarai as Atthaiyamma – Anitha's grandmother
- Usha Elizabeth Suraj as Kaaliyamma – antagonist
- Sai Gopi as Dharmalingam
- Shree Ashwini as Inspector Vijayalakshmi
- Bhagyalakshmi as Vijaya
- Archana Harish as Supraja
- Rajesh as Naveen – Aishwarya's friend
- Swathi Reddy as Swathy – Poorna's friend
- Prem as Krishna Kumar
- Cumbum Meena Sellamuthu as Alamelu
- Baboos as Thandavam

=== Guest appearances ===
- S. P. Balasubrahmanyam as himself – episodes 3 and 4
- Srithika Saneesh as Vidhya – episodes 587 and 588
- Arnav as Ashok – episodes 587 and 588
- Priyanka Kumar as Iniya – episodes 629 and 630
- Sateesh Kumar as Vasudevan – episodes 629 and 630

== Production ==
=== Casting ===
Revathi was cast as the lead Azhagu who making her comeback after 10 years. It is the second serial for the male lead Thalaivasal Vijay after 27 years. Shruthi Raj and V J Sangeeta were cast as the next leads. Aishwarya makes a TV serial comeback after 3 years sabbatical. Niranjan Bs was cast as Thiruna.

In October 2019, Sahana Sheddy playing Kavya quit the series stating less screen space for her role. However, within few days, she rejoined the series after the production team convinced her. In November 2019, Vaishnavi Arulmozhi replaced Akshitha Bopaiah as Nivedita. In the same month, Revathi returned to the series after 2 months break after her film shootings.

=== Development ===
On 1 April 2018, a special celebration sequence of Azhagu and Palanisamy getting married took place with the invitation of their friends and public.

The production and shooting of all Indian television series and films were halted, due to COVID-19 pandemic in India, on 19 March 2020 and were supposed to resume after 31 March 2020. However, due to nationwide lockdown in the country imposed from 25 March 2020, it could not resume and the last new episode was broadcast on 3 April 2020. After about three months, the shooting resumed after being granted permission in early June 2020 and some sequences were shot with some cast including Urvashi as a new addition. However, Tamil Nadu Government announced full lockdown from 19 June 2020 to 30 June 2020 for Chennai and its surrounding three districts. Due to it the production and filming was also once again halted. In July 2020, Sun TV abruptly confirmed the series not returning as many of the cast members including Revathi and Sruthi Raj were sceptical to arrive to shoot owing the pandemic.
