= Gouri G. Kishan =

Indian actress born 1999)

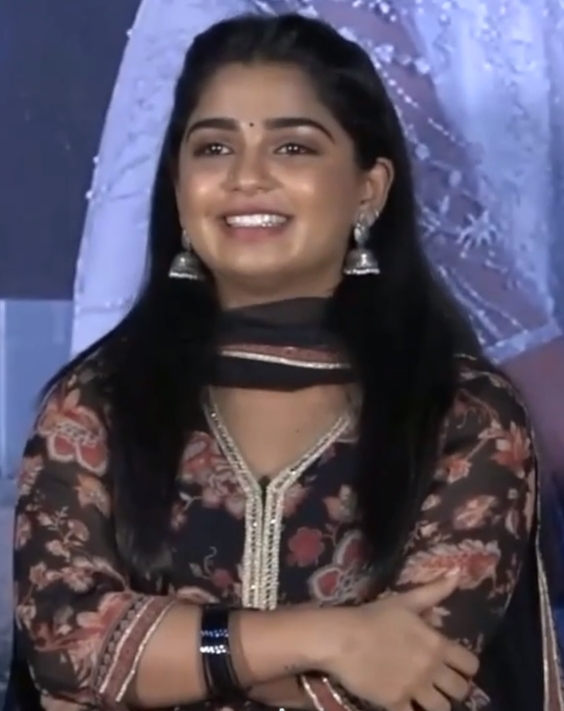
- Gouri in 2023
- Born: 17 August 1999 (age 27); Adoor, Kerala, India
- Occupation: Actress
- Years active: 2018–present

Gouri G. Kishan (born 17 August 1999) is an Indian actress who primarily works in Tamil and Malayalam films. She is best known for her role of the younger version of Trisha's character Jaanu in the film '96 (2018).

== Early life ==
Gouri G Kishan was born on 17 August 1999 at Adoor in the Pathanamthitta district of Kerala to Geethakishan and Veena. Her mother is from Vaikom, Kottayam. Her native language is Malayalam. She was raised in Chennai and did her schooling at The Hindu Senior Secondary School in Chennai. She then completed her B.A. degree in Journalism from Christ University, Bengaluru.

== Career ==
Gouri G Kishan played the younger version of Trisha's character, Jaanu, in the Tamil-language film, '96 (2018). She won the role after her uncle in Dubai told her about the casting call. Gouri was studying grade 12 and was called for an audition for the film. Her performance in the film received positive reviews and brought further film offers. In 2019, she made her debut in Malayalam cinema with Margamkali (2019). She was set to make her debut in the film Anugraheethan Antony with Sunny Wayne, but the production of the film was delayed, which meant that Margamkali ended up releasing first. She starred opposite Bibin George in Margamkali.

In 2020, she reprised her role as Jaanu in the Telugu remake of 96, Jaanu, which marked her Telugu debut. Her performance in the film was praised by critics. Sangeetha Devi Dundoo of The Hindu remarked that "Gouri G Kishan as the teenage Samantha is brilliant". She played a college student in Master (2021). Gouri also starred in Karnan playing one of the three heroines along with Rajisha Vijayan and Lakshmi Priyaa Chandramouli. with Dhanush, which is directed by Mari Selvaraj. She made her lead Telugu debut with Sridevi Shoban Babu (2023), playing the titular female role.

== Filmography ==
Key
| † | Denotes films that have not yet been released |

=== Film ===
| Year | Title | Role(s) | Language(s) | Notes | Ref. |
|---|---|---|---|---|---|
| 2018 | '96 | Young Janaki Devi a.k.a. Jaanu | Tamil | | |
| 2019 | Margamkali | Jessy | Malayalam | | |
| 2020 | Jaanu | Young Janaki Devi aka Jaanu | Telugu | | |
| 2021 | Master | Savitha | Tamil | | |
| 2021 | Karnan | Poyilaal | Tamil | | |
| 2021 | Anugraheethan Antony | Sanjana Madhavan | Malayalam | | |
| 2022 | Putham Pudhu Kaalai Vidiyaadhaa | PC Kuyili | Tamil | Amazon Prime original; segment Mugakavasa Mutham | |
| 2023 | Beginning | Nithya | Tamil | | |
| 2023 | Sridevi Shoban Babu | Sridevi | Telugu | | |
| 2023 | Anuragam | Janani | Malayalam | | |
| 2023 | Adiyae | Senthaazhini | Tamil | | |
| 2023 | Ulagammai | Ulagammai | Tamil | | |
| 2023 | Little Miss Rawther | Naina Rawther | Malayalam | | |
| 2024 | Oru Sarkar Ulpannam | Divya | Malayalam | | |
| 2024 | Hot Spot | Dhanya | Tamil | segment: "Happy Married Life" | |
| 2024 | Boat | Lakshmi | Tamil | | |
| 2025 | Sahasam | Sera Issac | Malayalam | | |
| 2025 | Others | Dr. Madhu | Tamil | | |
| 2026 | Love Insurance Kompany | Kalki | Tamil | | |
| TBA | Production #1 | TBA | Tamil | | |

=== Web series ===
| Year | Title | Role | Language | Streaming platform | Notes | Ref. |
|---|---|---|---|---|---|---|
| 2022 | Paper Rocket | Charu | Tamil | ZEE5 | | |
| 2025 | Love Under Construction | Gouri Gopakumar | Malayalam | Disney+Hotstar | | |
| 2025 | Suzhal: The Vortex | Muthu aka Madhubala | Tamil | Amazon Prime | | |
| 2026 | Love Always | Manjula | Tamil | JioHotstar | | |

=== Music videos ===
| Year | Album | Role | Composed By | Label | Language | Ref. |
|---|---|---|---|---|---|---|
| 2019 | "Hi Hello Kadhal" | Sruthi Das | Vinayak Sashikumar | YouTube | Malayalam | |
| 2020 | "Maraiyadha Kaneer Illai" | | Jen Martin | Sony Music South | Tamil | |
| 2021 | "Magizhini" | | Govind Vasantha | Saregama Originals | Tamil | |
| 2022 | "Mozhigal Njan Varikal Nee" | Herself | Basil V Edapadu | Behindwoods | Malayalam | |

== Awards and nominations ==
| Year | Award | Category | Film | Result | Ref. |
|---|---|---|---|---|---|
| 2018 | Edison Awards | Best Debut Actress | '96 | Nominated | |
| 2018 | Vikatan Awards | Best Debut Actress | '96 | Nominated | |
| 2018 | SIIMA Award for Best Female Debut – Tamil | Best Debut Actress | '96 | Nominated | |
| 2018 | 8th South Indian International Movie Awards | Best Debut Actress | '96 | Nominated | |
| 2020 | SIIMA Award for Best Supporting Actress – Telugu | Best Supporting Actress | Jaanu | Nominated | |
| 2020 | 10th South Indian International Movie Awards | Best Supporting Actress | Jaanu | Nominated | |
| 2021 | 9th South Indian International Movie Awards | Best Supporting Actress | Jaanu | Nominated | |
