= Karthigai Deepam (TV series) =

2022 Indian Tamil language TV series

- Montages of Season 1 and 2
- Genre: Musical; Drama; romance
- Based on: Krishnakoli (Season 1)
- Written by: Dialogues; Baskar Sakthi (2022-23); Paari (August 2023- Jan 2024); Dharmalingam (Jan 2024- Present)
- Screenplay by: Sargunam Pungaraj & Sai Prashanth (2022-23)&(Jan 2024- Present); Amal Raj (August 2023-Jan 2024)
- Directed by: V. Sathasivam (2022-23 & 2024); Karthik (2023-24)(Present); Rathinam Vasudevan (2024-25)
- Starring: Arthika; Karthik Raj; Vaishnavi Satheesh
- Theme music composer: Hariharan
- Opening theme: "Irulellame Olimayamagum...."
- Country of origin: India
- Original language: Tamil
- No. of seasons: 2
- No. of episodes: 1236

Production
- Executive producer: K Krishna Kumar (Zee Tamil)
- Producer: Shruthi Narayanan; Vinodha Narayanan
- Cinematography: Kesavan
- Editor: S.Arul
- Camera setup: Multi-camera
- Running time: 22 minutes
- Production company: Shruthi Productions

Original release
- Network: Zee Tamil
- Release: 5 December 2022 – present

Related
- Krishnakoli

Karthigai Deepam is a 2022 Indian Tamil language television series having two seasons. The first season of the series starred Arthika and Karthik Raj (both in the titular role) and Arthika played in a dual role. It premiered on Zee Tamil from 5 December 2022 and ended on 9 November 2024. The storyline of the serial is taken from Zee Bangla's TV series Krishnakoli however it has a different narration.

After a 6-month leap, it continues as the second season of the series starring Karthik Raj with Vaishnavi Satheesh in the female lead.

== Series overview ==
Series	Episodes	Originally released	
Series	Episodes	First released	Last released
1	659	5 December 2022	9 November 2024
2	present	11 November 2024	Ongoing

== Plot ==
=== Season 1 ===
The story revolves around Deepa (Arthika) a young, poor, dusky girl, who faces discrimination because of her skin color. However, she is a very talented singer and sets out on a journey, to create an own identity for herself. She believes that her complexion is akin to Lord Kartikeyan's complexion. Unexpectedly due to evils plans she's forced to marry Karthikeyan alias Karthik (Karthik Raj) a good-hearted and a business man. After Deepa's marriage, her life changes after marriage when she goes on to make a career in music. Deepa changes her life drastically. Eventually Karthik's mother Abhirami Nacchiyar (Meera Krishna) as her daughter-in-law but, later she understands her Innocence and she accepts her and gradually Karthik and Deepa fall in love with each other.

As per Deepa's wish Abhirami arranges Remarriage for Karthik and Deepa. During their marriage Deepa gets kidnapped by Ramya (Nanditha Jennifer) and Riya (Mounika) but Deepa escapes from the duo but while escaping Aishwarya (Chandini Prakash) push her off the hills and Deepa falls into a coma and loses her memory. Karthik, begin to search her with help of Geetha (Arthika) who is the doppelganger of Deepa and a prisoner. Karthik organize a concert and he promises to his mother and Deepa's family that he will definitely brings deepa and make her to sing in concert. Aishwarya also arrives to kill deepa, but finally she gets arrested. Deepa also arrived with help of nurse Shakthi and Orphanage members.

Miraculously, deepa regains her memory and starts to sing in concert. After so, many hurdles and struggles finally Karthik and Deepa gets reunited but, unfortunately, Deepa dies and her sudden demise shatters Karthik. And finally it shows at Deepa's graveyard Karthik and Deepa's family members along with Geetha shares their condolences and Geetha also released from jail with help of Karthik and he says to Geetha the Good memories and Happiness that he gained from Deepa is enough for his life.

=== Season 2 ===
6 months later, after Deepa's death Karthik (Karthik Raj) moves to his native village, along with his brothers Anand and Arun and now currently stays with his grandparents Raja Sethupathi (Vijayakumar) and Parameshwari (Vadivukkarasi). Now Karthik assumes the role of a servant for Chamundeshwari (Reshma Pasupuleti), who supposed to be Karthik's aunt in order to get their family reunited.

== Cast ==
=== Season 1 ===
==== Main ====
- Arthika in a dual role as:
  - Deepa Karthik/Pallavi: Karthik's wife (2022–2024)
  - Geetha: A businesswoman; Deepa's lookalike (2024)
- Karthik Raj as Karthikeyan "Karthik" Arunachalam: Deepa's Husband (2022–2024)

==== Recurring ====
- Meera Krishna as Abhirami Nachiyaar Arunachalam: Karthik, Anand and Arun's mother. (2022-2024)
- Madhu Mohan as Arunachalam: Karthik, Anand and Arun's father. (2022-2024)
- Rajesh as Dharmalingam: Deepa's father. (2022-2024)
- Tamil Selvi as Janaki: Deepa's mother and Dharmalingam's wife (2022-2024)
- Riya Choudhary as Meenakshi: Anand's wife. (2022-2024)
- Nimesh Sagar as Anandakumar alias Anand Arunachalam: Abhirami and Arunachalam's eldest son. (2022-2024)
- Ayub VJ as Arunkumar alias Arun Arunachalam: Abhirami and Arunachalam's second eldest son. (2022-2024)
- Vandhana Michael → Shubha Raksha → Chandini Prakash as Aishwarya: Arun's wife. (2022-2024)
- Reshmaa as Mythili Dharmalingam's daughter-in-law; Deepa's sister-in-law. (2022-2024)
- Sathya Sudha as Dharmalingam's son; Deepa's brother. (2022)
- Sri Varshan Chinraj as Dharmalingam's son. (2022-2024)
- Indran as Raja: Karthik's best friend. (2023-2024)
- Dinesh Gopalsamy as Shivakumar alias Shiva: Abhirami's Arch- Rival. (2022-2023)
- "Adhu Idhu Edhu" Diwakar as Rajkumar alias Raju: Shiva's sidekick. (2022-2023)
- Sharmila Thapa as Thilaga: Abhirami's house-maid. (2022-2023)
- Vichithra as Rajashree: A village president; Roopashree's mother. (2022-2023)
- Janani Deva → Megna Jayakrishnaraj as Roopashree: Rajashree's daughter. (2022-2024)
- Pondy Ravi as Thungaa: Geetha's Arch-Rival. (2024)
- Unkonown as Nurse Shakthi (2024)
- Mohan Raman as Chidhambaram: Karthik's enemy. (2023-2024)
- Saravanan → Mahesh Prabha as Inspector Saravanavel: Karthik's friend. (2023-2024)
- Smriti Kashyap as Nakshathra: Karthik's ex-fiancé. (2022-2023)
- Mounika Subramanyam as Riya: Anand's fake wife. (2024)
- Nanditha Jennifer as Ramya Viswanathan: Karthik's obsessive lover. (2024)

=== Special appearances ===
- Vijayakumar as Raja Sethupathi: Abhirami‘s father; Karthik, Anand and Arun‘s grandfather. (2023)
- Vadivukkarasi as Parameshwari: Abhirami‘s Mother. (2023 & 2024)
- Vanitha Vijayakumar as Chamundeshwari: Arunachalam's sister. (2023)
- Ambika as herself (2024)
- Chandini Prakash as Nikitha: Aishwarya's cousin. (2022)
- Senthilnathan as Astrolger Sanmugam (2024)
- Vimal Kumar as Ramesh: Ramya's fiance. (2024)
- Ashika Padukone as Maari
- VJ Dhanshik Vijayakumar as Malar: Abhirami's Niece. (2023)
- Dharani Hephzibah as Fake Pallavi (2024)
- Nanda Gopal (2023)
- Jayanthi Narayanan (2023)

=== Season 2 ===
==== Main ====
- Karthik Raj as Karthikeyan Arunachalam / Raja: Deepa's widower; Revathi's husband (2024–present)
- Vaishnavi Satheesh as Revathi Karthikeyan: Chamundeshwari's second daughter; Karthik's second wife (2024–present)

==== Recurring ====
- Reshma Pasupuleti as Chamundeshwari: Raja Sethupathi and Parameshwari's daughter-in-law. (2024–present)
- Krithika Annamalai as Chandrakala: Chamundeshwari's younger sister. (2024–present)
- Mahesh as Mayilvaganam: Rohini's husband. (2024–present)
- Ramachandran Mahalingam as Rajarajan: Chamundeshwari's husband; Abhirami's brother. (2024–present)
- Dhanalakshmi Shiva as Rohini: Chamundeshwari's eldest daughter. (2024–present)
- Feroz Khan as Sivanandi: Chandrakala's husband. (2024–present)
- Rathan Ganapathy as Muthuvel: Sivanandi's uncle. (2024–present)
- Kaviya as Swathi: Chamundeshwari's youngest daughter. (2024–present)
- Vadivukkarasi as Parameshwari: Abhirami and Rajarajan‘s mother; Chamundeshwari's mother-in-law. (2024–present)
- Bhavani Chowdhury as Durga: Chamundeshwari's third eldest daughter. (2024–2025)
- Navin Kishore as Naveen: Durga's husband and Karthikeyan's friend. (2025)
- Meera Krishna as Abhirami Nachiyaar Arunachalam: Rajarajan's sister; Karthik, Anand and Arun's mother. (2024–2025)
- Nimesh Sagar as Anandakumar alias Anand Arunachalam: Abhirami and Arunachalam's eldest son. (2024–present)
- Indran as Raja: Karthik's best friend. (2024–present)
- Ayub VJ as Arunkumar alias Arun Arunachalam: Abhirami and Arunachalam's second eldest son. (2024–2026)
- Mounika Subramanyam as Kala: Marudhu's sister. (2026)
- Mukesh Khanna as Marudhanayagam: Revathi's ex-fiancé. (2026)
- Papri Ghosh as Priya: Karthik's employee. (2026)
- Vijayakumar as Raja Sethupathi alias Sethur Raja: Abhirami and Rajarajan‘s father; Chamundeshwari's father-in-law. (2024–present)
- Ashwanth Thilak as Mahesh: Revathi's ex-fiancé. (2024–present)
- Suganya Vish as Maya: Mahesh's sister-in-law and mistress (2024–present)
- Bharathi Mohan as Perumal: A villager, Karthik's enemy (2024–2025)
- Tamil Selvi as Janaki: Deepa's mother and Dharmalingam's wife (2025)
- Reshmaa as Mythili: Deepa's sister-in-law. (2025)

=== Special appearances ===
- Keerthana as Sivagami: Chamundeshwari's mother. (2024) (Dead)
- Ranjan Kumar as Sivagami's husband: Chamundeshwari's father (2024)
- Divyadharshini as young Chamundeshwari (2024)
- CN Ravishankar as Sivanandi's father (2024) (Dead)
- Eesan Sujatha as Valliammal: Sivanandi's mother (2024)
- Poornima Bhagyaraj as Rajeshwari: Chamundeshwari's business friend. (2025)
- Arthika as Deepa Karthik alias Pallavi: Karthik's dead wife. (2025) (Dead) (in a photographic appearance)
- Fathima Babu as Kaaliammal: Valliammal's sister and Sivanandi's aunt (2025)
- Keerthana Podwal as Maari (2025)
- Kausalya as Kausalya IPS (2025)
- Ajay Rathnam as Minister Sanmugam (2026)
- Sudha Chandran as Minister Ranganayagi (2026)
- Sona Heiden as Gayathri Devi (2026)

== Production ==
=== Casting ===
==== Season 1 ====
Initially, actress Roshini Haripriyan was chosen and approached to play the female lead but she denied. Later, Malayalam actress Arthika was ultimately cast as Deepa. Karthik Raj was selected to play the role of smart businessman Karthikeyan, making his comeback to Tamil Television after Sembaruthi nearly two years. Vichithra as selected to play the negative lead and making her presence in the Tamil television after one year. Rajesh plays a father role of Deepa, Meera Krishna plays a mother role of Karthikeyan. Besides Dinesh Gopalsamy and Tamilselvi were cast then.

In June 2023, Actor Vijayakumar was joined as Raja Sethupathi. In February 2024, Actress Mounika was joined. In the following 3 May 2024, Actress Nanditha Jennifer was cast as Ramya Viswanathan, marking his return after Amman season 1. In August 2024 Vimal Kumar was cast to play as Ramesh.

==== Season 2 ====
After a 6-month leap, from Season 1 all characters are retained except Deepa and Geetha (both played by Arthika). In season 2, Malayalam actress Vaishnavi Satheesh selected for the female lead. Some cast members from the first season were retained while, Reshma Pasupuleti was playing negative role as Chaumundeshwari. Then, Krithika Annamalai, Dhanalakshmi and Ramachandran also joined for the supporting role.

In March 2025, Actor Navin Kishore was joined as Naveen.
