= 465 (film) =

2017 Indian Tamil horror film by Sai Sathyam

- Theatrical release poster
- Directed by: Sai Sathyam
- Written by: Sai Sathyam
- Produced by: S.L. Prabhu
- Starring: Karthik Raj; Niranjana Anoop; Manobala
- Cinematography: Philip R. Sunder
- Music by: Sashank Ravichandran
- Production company: L.P.S Films
- Release date: 24 March 2017
- Country: India
- Language: Tamil

465 also known as Naalu Aaru Anju (transl. Four hundred and sixty five) is a 2017 Indian Tamil-language horror film written and directed by civil engineer turned filmmaker Sai Sathyam in his directorial debut and produced by S.L. Prabhu. The film stars Karthik Raj, Niranjana Anoop and Manobala in the lead roles. The film was released on 24 March 2017. This film is loosely based on 1966 Indian Tamil-language psychological thriller film Yaar Nee?

== Plot ==
Jai (Karthik Raj) works as a doctor for a private hospital along with Manobala. Despite Karthik being fallen in love with another woman, a fellow doctor falls in love with Karthik. At a given point in time, both Manobala and the lady doctor die under mysterious circumstances. Karthik who is present at the murder scene chases an unidentified woman in a green dress, but unable to catch her. Police suspect Karthik had a hand in the murders. Karthik tries to move on, but strange things begin to happen around him. One day, Karthik sees a girl being chased by unidentified men. He sees that the girl slowly turns into a ghostly figure (we will refer to her as girl ghost). This incident stuns Karthick.

Another day, he meets an old man on a deserted road claiming her granddaughter needs of medical help. Karthik tries to help him and the old man leads him to a seemingly deserted and haunted house. The house is devoid of any lighting and the old man makes Karthik take a stairs to check his granddaughter. However, the old man vanishes and Karthik is greeted by a friendly but strange woman claiming she is the owner of the house and the old man is actually a ghost. Karthik tries to leave the place but finds that the woman is murdered in the kitchen. On his way out of the house, he sees the same girl ghost. Karthik is confused and returns home, where he discusses the ghost sightings with his brother and man-servant. The man-servant feels Karthik should be more careful as he keeps seeing the same girl again and again. In his room, Karthik sees a newspaper article, which states that the girl ghost is actually a person who was killed in a train accident almost a year ago. He is further confused about what is happening around him.

The next day, his brother brings Karthik a set of potential prospects for Karthik's marriage. Karthik is stunned to see the photo of the girl named Harini, which resembles the girl ghost. Intrigued Karthik marries Harini with the sole motive to prove she indeed is a ghost. Karthik treats Harini badly, verbally insulting her for being a ghost. Harini tries to adjust with Karthik as she is an orphan. She is dedicated to his well-being and devoted as a wife, but does not understand why Karthik keeps referring to him as a ghost.

Karthik's brother believes his sister-in-law and chides Karthik for treating her badly. One day when Karthik and his brother are in a coffee shop, Karthik's brother convinces that there is nothing wrong with Harini and Karthik has to change his ways. Karthik realizes his mistake and tries to make things up and apologizes to Harini over the phone. Karthik's brother is happy that he is patching things with his wife and leaves the coffee shop. As he prepares to leave, he is shocked to see the girl ghost sitting in the same seat as his. She slowly walks away and gets into a car, maintaining a ghostly smile. Karthik rushes home and finds his brother and man-servant there. Both bizarrely claim they never left the home and Harini is upstairs in her room. Things take a bad turn as Harini gets tired of Karthik accusing him of being a ghost and she complains to the hospital where Karthik works. His superiors from the hospital subdue Karthik due to his violent behavior and start wondering whether Karthik is facing a mental breakdown and hallucinating. When questioned, Karthik's brother and man-servant claim they never were in the coffee shop and it's a figment of imagination from Karthik.

Karthik is admitted to the hospital on suspected mental illness and he starts suspecting himself. We get to hear that Karthick is in line for a 150 crore inheritance from his family and the formalities are to be closed in two days' time. The chief doctor instructs that no one apart from the hospital should know about Karthik's mental condition and asks Harini not to be around Karthik as it might affect him mentally.

The next day, Karthik hears a knock on his door only to see the whole hospital is deserted. He starts to doubt his sanity when he sees the girl ghost again. The ghost smiles at Karthik, slowly gets into a car, and leaves. Karthik tries to chase the car on foot, but in vain. He steals a bike from someone and gives a chase to the car the girl got into. The car drives to the same house from the previous scene where the old man claiming his sick granddaughter was. We see that the ghost comes out of the passenger side door, and it is Karthik's brother who comes out of the driver's seat. Things start to make sense for Karthik, where he understand the whole ghost episode is nothing but a drama orchestrated by his brother. The girl enters the haunted house while his brother leaves. Karthik chases the girl and subdues her. He finds many selfie videos in the girl's mobile, where the plot unfolds. The girl is actually a girlfriend of his brother. She along with Karthik's brother and man-servant had co-conspired against Karthik to play an elaborate show to make Karthik question reality. Their ultimate aim was to declare Karthik as mentally unstable and claim the inheritance. In the process, the conspirators kill Karthik's girlfriend and her father Manobala. Enraged, Karthik kills the girl.

The scene now shifts 6 years later, where we see Karthik has married another beautiful girl and happily settled into the family. The couple have a daughter. The daughter sees the actual ghost of the girl (Harini). Unknown to Karthik and his wife, the ghost possesses the kid.

== Cast ==
- Karthik Raj as Dr. Jai
- Niranjana Anoop
- Manobala
- Pavani Reddy as Jai's wife
- Uday Mahesh
- Jayashree Rao
- Crane Manohar
