= Love Under Construction =

- Genre: Romantic comedy
- Directed by: Vishnu G Raghav
- Starring: Neeraj Madhav; Aju Varghese; Gouri G. Kishan; Anand Manmadhan
- Music by: Gopi Sundar
- Country of origin: India
- Original language: Malayalam
- No. of seasons: 1
- No. of episodes: 6

Production
- Producer: M. Renjith
- Cinematography: Ajay David Kachappilly
- Editor: Arju Benn
- Running time: 29-34 minutes
- Production company: Rejaputhra Visual Media

Original release
- Network: JioHotstar
- Release: 28 February 2025

Love Under Construction is an Indian Malayalam-language romantic comedy television series directed by Vishnu G Raghav starring Neeraj Madhav, Aju Varghese, Gouri G. Kishan, Anand Manmadhan and Ann Saleem in lead roles. The series premiered on 28 February 2025 on JioHotstar.

== Plot ==
The series revolve around Vinod, who wishes to construct his own house, ignoring his financial instability. While he wants to marry the girl he loves (Gouri), he has to face challenges, both from her parents and their society.

== Cast ==
- Neeraj Madhav as Vinod Sudhakaran
- Aju Varghese as Padmarajan aka Pappan
- Gouri G. Kishan as Gouri Gopakumar
- Anand Manmadhan as Contractor Jiji
- Ann Saleem as Lisy
- Ganga Meera as Remya Ravi
- Kiran Peethambaran as Gopakumar
- Manju Sree Nair as Sindhu
- Thushara Pillai as Gouri's mother
- Saheer Mohammed as Sudhakaran Nair
- Thankamani Mohan as Sudha
- Krishnan Balakrishnan as Anil
- Dixon Poduthas as Abraham
- Suryadev Sajesh Marar as JR Vinod
- Arun Paavumba as Binu
- Santhosh Venjaramoodu as Suresh
- Sreejith Sreekumar as Assami worker
- Sreejith Babu as Bank staff
- Reghuchandran as Sub registrar
- Chandini Sasikumar as servant

== Production ==
The series directed by Vishnu G Raghav, known for his debut film Vaashi was announced in September 2023. The series began filming on 3 October 2023 and wrapped up on 21 January 2024.

=== Marketing ===
Son of Sreenivasan, a roast interview with Vishnu G Raghav, Neeraj Madhav and Aju Varghese hosted by Dhyan Sreenivasan for promoting the series was released on 24 February 2025.

== Release ==
The series premiered on 28 February 2025 on JioHotstar. It is the first Malayalam series on JioHotstar, the rebranded platform of Disney+ Hotstar in India.

== Episodes ==
No. in season	Title	Original release date
1	"Foundation of Love"	28 February 2025
2	"Building Bridges"	28 February 2025
3	"Reinforced marriage"	28 February 2025
4	"Bricks and Hearts"	28 February 2025
5	"Sealing the Hearts"	28 February 2025
6	"The Final Coat"	28 February 2025

== Reception ==
The series received positive reviews from critics and audience. Divya P of OTTPlay rated the series 3 out of 5 stars and wrote:"Neeraj Madhav builds on Vishnu Raghav's solid comedy-drama series". Vishal Menon of The Hollywood Reporter wrote:"Neeraj Madhav Stars in This Neatly-Written, Passive Viewing Comedy ".Vignesh Madhu of Cinema Express wrote:"This modern-day Mithunam-Varavelpu cocktail leaves a sweet aftertaste". Dhanya K Vilayil of The Indian Express wrote:"'Love Under Construction' gives Bright perspectives, natural performances". Latha Srinivasan of Hindustan Times wrote:"Neeraj Madhav and Aju Varghese keep us engaged in this comedy drama".
