= Rettai Vaal Kuruvi (TV series) =

- Promotional poster
- Written by: Jerold
- Directed by: Jerold
- Starring: Ashwin Kumar Lakshmikanthan; Pavani Reddy
- Opening theme: "Thada Thadavena" by Naran
- Country of origin: India
- Original language: Tamil
- No. of episodes: 99

Production
- Producer: Harish sajja
- Cinematography: Vishwanathan
- Editor: S.Bala
- Running time: approx. 20-22 minutes per episode

Original release
- Network: STAR Vijay
- Release: 1 June – 16 October 2015

Rettai Vaal Kuruvi is a 2015 Indian Tamil-language soap opera starring Ashwin Kumar Lakshmikanthan and Pavani Reddy as a divorced couple who rekindle their romance. It aired on Vijay TV from 1 June 2015 to 16 October 2015 on Monday to Friday at 9:00PM IST for 99 episodes. It was directed by Jerold, with cinematography by Vishwanathan and music by Saravanan.

== Plot ==
The romance drama is about a divorced couple, who begin working at the same office. Nila's father, plans to kill Bala as a revenge on his sister's husband. He brings two local goons from Madurai to kill Bala and is stabbed but survives by the timely help of Nila. Nila and Bala become closer to each other. But as soon as Bala finds out Nila's father tried to kill him he becomes furious on Nila too. Then he goes to his friend, Armugam's marriage in a village to refresh his mind without telling any of his relatives. On the other hand, Nila lies to everyone that she is interested in moving to America as she can't bear Bala's hatred towards her but, moves to the same village to which Bala goes, without knowing his presence in there. It turns out to be Nila, the friend of Arumugam's to be wife, Devayani. Bala and Nila try to be away from each other but as Nila's friends were flirting with Bala, jealousy grows within Nila which brings them closer. Deyvani's mum and Arumugam's sister in law plan to bring them together in various ways, but none work. Pazhani, Deyvani's brother who went to prison for a murder regularly met her secretly, which Bala noticed and doubted on the bride. Without knowing Pazhani to be Devayani's brother, Bala brings the meeting to public, where Pazhani is hit by the village people. Though Bala and Nila get to know about each other's love, they're not expressing it. To ask forgiveness Bala and his friends visit the Deyvanai's place, but Pazhani beats them up. And due to sympathy the family forgives them but a nota for the marriage. Nila really feels sorry and both of them confess their love again. On the same day Nila gets hit by a car and is admitted in a hospital. Due to Nila's critical condition, her family moves her to Germany for treatment, without Bala's knowledge. Bala's passport is blocked by Nila's father ruining all ways to reach her. After few years Nila's sister in law calls Bala and tells him Nila doesn't remember her past. Without anyone revealing about Bala as her HUSBAND, she writes Bala's name on her own whenever she gets a paper. So they realise her love and reunite Bala and Nila with a new start. However Bala tells Nila, that he was her close friend. So she tells him to take her to places they have visited before in his bike. And they start over again.

== Cast ==
Main Cast

- Ashwin Kumar Lakshmikanthan as Balamurugan/Bala
- Pavani Reddy as Vennilla/Nila

Supporting character

- Ramrath Reddy
- Renuka
- Sathana
- Kethumathi
- Neeliya
- Jayathish
- Sneha
- Pirabha
- Manikandan
- Priya

== Awards and nominations ==
Year	Award	Category	Recipient	Role	Result
2015	Vijay Television Awards	Favourite Find of The Year	Ashwin Kumar Lakshmikanthan	Balamurugan	Nominated
2015	Vijay Television Awards	Favourite Find of The Year	Pavani Reddy	Vennila	Nominated
2015	Vijay Television Awards	Favourite Screen Pair	Ashwin Kumar Lakshmikanthan & Pavani Reddy	Balamurugan & Vennila	Nominated
2015	Vijay Television Awards	Best Promo-Fiction	Rettai Vaal Kuruvi		Nominated
