= Pala. Karuppiah =

Indian politician

Member of Tamil Nadu Legislative Assembly
- In office 23 May 2011 – 21 May 2016
- Preceded by: K. Anbazhagan
- Succeeded by: P. K. Sekar Babu
- Constituency: Harbour

Personal details
- Born: Chinna Karuppiah; 2 April 1943 (age 83) Karaikudi
- Other political affiliations: Congress, Janata Dal, MDMK, AIADMK (2010-2016) DMK(2016-2019) Makkal Needhi Maiam (2021) Tamilnadu Thanurimai Kalagam (2023)
- Occupation: Actor, Writer and Cinema Producer

Pala. Karuppiah (born Chinna Karuppiah on 2 April 1943) is an Indian politician, film producer, actor and author. He was an MLA in the 14th Tamil Nadu Legislative Assembly from the Harbour constituency in the Chennai District. As an actor, he is best known for his role in Sarkar.

== Film career ==
Karuppiah started his film career with Thiruvannamalai (2008). He rose to fame for his role in Sarkar (2018) as Masilamani, the former Chief Minister of Tamil Nadu and one of the antagonists. He has gone on to play political and character roles in films such as Action (2019) and Sembi (2022).

== Political career ==
On 28 January 2016 Pala was expelled from AIADMK by party general secretary J. Jayalalithaa after being accused of indulging in activities contrary to party ideology and bringing it into disrepute. A day later, he resigned from his assembly constituency. His house was attacked by unknown assailants following it. He later met the media and accused the AIADMK government of corruption.

== Filmography ==
=== Actor ===
List of Pala. Karuppiah film credits as actor
Year	Film	Role	Notes
2008	Thiruvannamalai	Local Politician	
2010	Angadi Theru	Annachi	
2018	Sarkar	M. Masilamani, Chief Minister of Tamil Nadu	
2019	Action	Chief Minister of Tamil Nadu	
2021	MGR Magan	K. R. Thangavel	
2021	Friendship	Judge	
2022	Sembi	Adhiyamaan, Chief Minister of Tamil Nadu	
2023	Kannai Nambathey	Mu. Aalavanthaan, Health Minister	
2023	License	Minister of Law	
2023	Sarakku	Judge	
2024	Oru Nodi	Thirunayana Moorthy	
2024	Ninnu Vilayadu		
2024	Haraa	Chief Minister	
2024	Paraman	Malaisamy	
2024	Rajakili	Spiritual Guru	
2026	Mookuthi Amman 2	Minister	

=== Producer ===
- Indru Nee Nalai Naan (1983)
- Andha Oru Nimidam (1985)
- Maamiyargal Jakkirathai (1986)
- Theertha Karaiyinile (1987)
- Poruthathu Pothum (1988)
- Vaa Vaa Vasanthamey (1992) (also director)
- Naadi Thudikkuthadi (2020)

== Bibliography ==
- Pattinathaar Oru Paarvai
- Arasiyal Sadhirattangal
- Kaalam Kizhittha Kodugal
- Kannadhaasan
- Kaalathin Velippaadu
- Ellaigal Neettha Rama Kaadhai
- Karunanidhi Enna Kadavulaa.
