= Junior Senior (TV series) =

- Genre: Talent; Reality; Comedy
- Presented by: Keerthi; Kalyani
- Judges: Meena; Shiva; Rachitha Mahalakshmi
- Country of origin: India
- Original language: Tamil
- No. of episodes: 25

Production
- Camera setup: Multi-camera
- Running time: approx. 85–90 minutes per episode

Original release
- Network: Zee Tamil
- Release: 12 February – 30 July 2017

Junior Senior is a 2017 Indian-Tamil-language stand-up comedy reality TV show, which premiered on 12 February 2017 and 30 July 2017, and aired every Sunday on Zee Tamil.

The show is hosted by Kalyani (previously played by Keerthi). Kollywood actress Meena, actor Shiva, and Tamil television actress Rachitha Mahalakshmi are the judges of the show. Each team has two children (ages 4–14) and two adults (ages 18–25) as the participants. The show last aired on 30 July 2017 and ended with 25 episodes.

== Winners ==
Winners	Notes	Amount won
Sangi Mangi Sangam	Winners	₹ 2,00,000

== Cast ==
=== Hosted ===
- Kalyani: who had appeared in '"Alli thandha vaanam"' Julie role and some reality shows.
- Keerthi: (Episode: 01–12) who had appeared in Tamil reality shows Maanada Mayilada and Junior Super Star.
- Vignesh Karthick: (Episode - 01) who had appeared in Tamil serial and reality shows Pagal Nilavu, Suriya Vanakkam, Thabaal Petti Enn 8484 and Galatta Kudumbam.

=== Judges ===
- Meena evergreen actress of south Indian films. Yejaman movie female lead role
- Shiva [mirchi shiva] vanakkam Chennai male lead role
- Rachitha well known as Meenachi who had acted in Saravanan Menachi serial actress

== Special guest ==
- Epi: 01 Shiva
- Epi: 01 Deepak Dinkar, Archana, Nanthini
- Epi: 02 Srinivasan
- Epi: 03 Jeeva

== Team ==
- All in All Appatakkars
- Kaipulla Munetra Kalagam
- Sangi Mangi Sangam
- Hawa Hawa Gang
- Kundakka Mandakka Group
- Kabali Khan Club
- Kekraan Mekron Company

== Development ==
On 22 January 2017, the first promo of the show 'Twice the Fun' was released by Zee Tamil on YouTube.
