= Sembi =

2022 musical adventure drama film

- Theatrical release poster
- Directed by: Prabhu Solomon
- Written by: Prabhu Solomon
- Produced by: R. Ravindran; Ajmal Khan; Reyaa
- Starring: Nila; Kovai Sarala; Ashwin Kumar Lakshmikanthan
- Cinematography: M. Jeevan
- Edited by: Buvan
- Music by: Nivas K. Prasanna
- Production companies: Trident Arts; AR Entertainment
- Distributed by: Red Giant Movies
- Release date: 30 December 2022
- Country: India
- Language: Tamil

Sembi (செம்பி) is a 2022 Indian Tamil-language adventure drama film directed by Prabhu Solomon. The film stars Nila, Kovai Sarala, and Ashwin Kumar Lakshmikanthan, along with Thambi Ramaiah, Nanjil Sampath, and Pala. Karuppiah in supporting roles. The music was composed by Nivas K. Prasanna with cinematography by M. Jeevan and editing by Buvan. The film released theatrically on 30 December 2022 to highly positive reviews from critics.

== Plot ==
10-year-old Sembi (Nila) and her grandmother Veerathayi (Kovai Sarala), an apiarist, live peacefully amidst nature in the hilly regions of Kodaikanal. They lead a beautiful life until three influential miscreants - Mathivendhan (Jickson), Akshay (Yasar), and Surya (Suryaprakash) - gang rape Sembi and shatter all their dreams. When a police officer chokes Sembi and forces Veerathayi to withdraw the case after finding out the criminal is the minister's son, the latter has no other option but to thrash the officer very badly, and he ends up in a coma. The two escape and board a bus called Anbu, which is on its way from Kodaikanal to Dindigul. All 24 passengers on the bus, who are from different walks of life, thwart all the political interventions and are guided by a lawyer (Ashwin Kumar Lakshmikanthan). They help Veerathayi and the innocent Sembi get justice through the enactment of the POCSO Act (2012). Veerathayi and Sembi win the case, and the three criminals get life imprisonment till death. While giving a glimpse of the journey of the passengers aboard the Anbu bus, the film professes "Love thy Neighbor as thyself".

== Cast ==
- Nila as Sembi
- Kovai Sarala as Veerathayi
- Ashwin Kumar Lakshmikanthan as Lawyer
- Thambi Ramaiah as Anbu
- Nanjil Sampath as Ezhilvendan
- Pala. Karuppiah as Adhiyamaan
- G. Gnanasambandam as Judge
- Bharathi Kannan as Professor
- Jickson as Mathivendhan
- Yasar as Akshay
- Suryaprakash as Surya
- Akash as Masilamani
- Andrews as White Dog
- Victor Prabhakar
- Mullai Arasi
- Shiv Aditya
- Vijayalakshmi Veeramani

== Production ==
Most of the scenes in the film were majorly shot near Kodaikanal.

== Music ==
The music of the film was composed by Nivas K. Prasanna, which marks his first collaboration with the director. The first single titled "Aathi En Mela" was released on 28 October 2022.

Sembi

Soundtrack album by Nivas K. Prasanna
- Released: 2022
- Genre: Feature film soundtrack
- Length: 22:51
- Language: Tamil
- Label: Saregama
- Producer: Nivas K. Prasanna

Nivas K. Prasanna chronology
Vattam (2022)	Sembi (2022)	Yaadhum Oore Yaavarum Kelir (2023)

Track listing
No.	Title	Lyrics	Singer(s)	Length
1.	"Aathi En Mela"	Prabhu Solomon	Vandana Srinivasan	4:33
2.	"Yaarukum Yaaru Mela"	Prabhu Solomon	Nivas K. Prasanna, Darini Hariharan, Prabhu Solomon	3:35
3.	"Ennatha Naa"	Prabhu Solomon	Nivas K. Prasanna, Vandana Srinivasan	3:54
4.	"Uyiragi"	Prabhu Solomon, Nithin Menon	Nivas K. Prasanna	3:54
5.	"Kammangkoozhu Karuvadu"	Ilaya Kamban	Velmurugan, MK Balaji	3:15
6.	"Theru Theruva"	Kutti Revathi	V. M. Mahalingam	4:13
Total length:				22:51

== Release ==
=== Theatrical ===
The film was released worldwide in theatres on 30 December 2022 alongside Trisha’s starrer Raangi. The trailer of the film was released on 16 December 2022.

=== Home media ===
The post-theatrical streaming rights of the film has been sold to ZEE5, while the satellite rights of the film is sold to Zee Tamil. However, the digital and satellite rights were later changed to Disney + Hotstar and Star Vijay. The film had its digital premiere on Disney + Hotstar from 3 February 2023.

== Reception ==
Logesh Balachandran of The Times of India gave the film 3 out of 5 stars and wrote "Kovai Sarala's intense performance is a treat to watch. She has done great justice to the role and carries the film on her shoulders". Bhuvanesh Chander of The Hindu wrote "Despite all the fumbles, Prabhu manages to leave you with hope. To the vulnerable sections of society, he assures them that they are not alone, and to the rest of us, he asks us to look out for others". Senthilraja R of News18 wrote "It makes it seem like the song is not being focused on because the story should be given importance". Saradha U of The News Minute gave the film 2.5 out of 5 stars and wrote "Makers of Sembi briefly focus on how sexual abuse is politicised and how it hardly benefits the survivors". Navein Darshan of Cinema Express gave the film 3 out of 5 stars and wrote "Nivas Prasanna fills in the shoes of Prabhu's regular composer Imman and he delivers a remarkable background score that almost compensates for the forgettable songs". Dhanushya of ABP Live gave the film 3.5 out of 5 stars and wrote "Overall, Sembi is a film that gives voice to the voiceless". Khalillulah of Hindu Tamil Thisai wrote "On the whole, Prabhu Salomon's Sembi, who intends to transmit the intense pain by committing sexual violence against girls, is stymied by some obstacles". A critic for Cinema Vikatan wrote "That's why the POCSO court trial shown in the climax and the vibe it gives passes without much of a shock to us." Sakshi Post gave the film 3 out of 5 stars and wrote "Sembi is a movie worth a watch." A critic for India Herald wrote "Applause is due to the makeup artist and costume designer for bringing some realism to the screen."
