= Sridevi Shoban Babu =

2023 film by Prasanth Kumar Dimmala

Sridevi Shobhan Babu
- Directed by: Prasanth Kumar Dimmala
- Written by: Prasanth Kumar Dimmala
- Produced by: Vishnu Prasad; Sushmita Konidela
- Starring: Santosh Sobhan; Gouri G. Kishan
- Cinematography: Siddarth Ramaswamy
- Edited by: Shashidhar Reddy
- Music by: Kamran
- Production company: GoldBox Entertainment
- Release date: 18 February 2023
- Running time: 129 minutes
- Country: India
- Language: Telugu

Sridevi Shoban Babu is a 2023 Indian Telugu-language romantic comedy film written and directed by Prasanth Kumar Dimmala and produced by GoldBox Entertainment. Sridevi Shoban Babu features Santosh Sobhan and Gouri G. Kishan in lead roles. It was released on 18 February 2023. The film's title and its lead characters are named after the late superstars, Sridevi and Shoban Babu.

== Plot ==
Sridevi works as a professional stylist in Hyderabad. One day, she learns that her paternal aunt Kamala has insulted her father. So she leaves for Araku to confront her aunt. Sridevi meets Shoban Babu, Kamala's son, and she falls in love with him. The story ends when her father finally learns the truth and Shoban Babu confesses his love for Sridevi.

== Cast ==
- Santosh Sobhan as Shobhan Babu
- Gouri G. Kishan as Sridevi
- Nagababu as Sekar, Sridevi's father and Kamala's brother
- Rohini as Kamala, Shobhan Babu's mother and Sekhar's sister
- Mahaboob Basha
- Niveditha Dolly
- Samudram Venkatesh
- Srinivas
- Mrinalini Shastry

== Release ==
Sridevi Shoban Babu was initially scheduled to release on 14 April 2022, but was released on 18 February 2023. The film's satellite and digital streaming rights were acquired by Star Maa and Disney+ Hotstar, respectively. It premiered on Disney+ Hotstar on 30 March 2023.

== Reception ==
A critic of The Times of India stated that "Santosh Shobhan and Gouri G Kishan fare well in this romantic comedy. But archaic storytelling, trivial comic sequences and lack of engagement make it a drag". Abhilasha Cherukuri of Cinema Express, wrote, "The lack of cinema-appropriate depth-of-field in most frames, the barely functional editing, or the unfunny jokes gives the audience a feeling of watching an amateur short film".
