= Kadhal Dot Com =

- DVD cover
- Directed by: S. R. Selvaraj
- Produced by: Kathir Seveal
- Starring: Prasanna; Sruthi Raj; Anu I. V.
- Cinematography: Shankar
- Music by: Bharadwaj
- Production company: AAA Movies International
- Release date: 2 April 2004
- Running time: 144 minutes
- Country: India
- Language: Tamil

Kadhal Dot Com (transl. Love Dot Com) is a 2004 Indian Tamil-language romance film directed by S. R. Selvaraj. The film stars Prasanna, Sruthi Raj and Anu, while Vadivelu and S. V. Shekher played supporting roles.

== Plot ==
Vinod's parents want him to marry Priya as she is madly in love with him. But she is unaware that Vinod is in love with his childhood friend Sandhya.

== Cast ==
- Prasanna as Vinod
- Sruthi Raj as Priya
- Anu I. V. as Sandhya
- Vadivelu as Pichu
- Prashanth Kharun as Guna
- Ahilan
- Madhan Bob
- Pandu as PT master
- Sethu Vinayagam as Vinod's father
- Nirosha as Usha
- S. V. Shekher as Priya's uncle
- Radhika Chaudhari in an item number "Pacha Thanni"

== Production ==
The song "Atha Ponnu" choreographed by Robert was shot at Trincomalee Tea estate at Sri Lanka. Since the film's producer Subha Sevvel is a Sri Lankan Tamil resident, two of the songs were shot at Sri Lanka.

== Soundtrack ==
The soundtrack of the film was composed by Bharadwaj. The song "Imaikkada Vizhiyum" is set in Hamsadhvani raga.

Track listing
| No. | Title | Lyrics | Singer(s) | Length |
|---|---|---|---|---|
| 1. | "Imaikkatha Vizhigal" | Thamarai | Srinivas, Srimathumitha | 4:59 |
| 2. | "Pacha Thanni" | Viveka | Mano, Reshmi | 4:04 |
| 3. | "Kadhal Kadhal" | Palani Bharathi | Hariharan, Priyadarshini | 5:48 |
| 4. | "Unna Enakku" | Snehan | Anuradha Sriram, P. Unnikrishnan | 5:07 |
| 5. | "Vennila" | Palani Bharathi | Reshmi, Geetha, Bindu, Uma Maheshwaran | 4:53 |
| 6. | "Atha Ponnu" | Viveka | Balram, Pop Shalini | 4:43 |
| Total length: | | | | 29:34 |

== Reception ==
Malathi Rangarajan from The Hindu noted "at a time when much-hyped, hero-backed films end up being mere dampeners, a low-key film like this comes with no unsavoury loudness or lewdness, is at least a decent offering." Malini Mannath from Chennai Online wrote that "There are no big names associated with it, so one goes without any expectations. But the director's attempt towards the closing scenes to give a slightly practical and different ending to the love triangle, makes viewing the film a not-so-bad experience". A critic from Sify wrote that "Kadhal.com is yet another triangular love story that we have seen in umpteen Tamil films about two friends falling in love with the same guy. Still Kadhal.Com is quite entertaining and worth a look as it is interesting in parts".
