= Sahasam (2025 film) =

2025 Indian-Malayalam language film

- Theatrical release poster
- Directed by: Bibin Krishna
- Written by: Bibin Krishna; Yadhukrishna Deyakumar
- Produced by: Rinish K. N
- Starring: Narain; Babu Antony; Gouri G. Kishan; Ramzan Muhammed; Aju Varghese; Baiju Santhosh; Shabareesh Varma
- Cinematography: Alby Antony
- Edited by: Kiran Das
- Music by: Bibin Ashok
- Production company: Front Row Productions
- Distributed by: Central Pictures
- Release date: 8 August 2025 (India)
- Running time: 144 minutes
- Country: India
- Language: Malayalam

Sahasam (transl. Derring-do) is a 2025 Indian Malayalam-language action comedy film written and directed by Bibin Krishna. The film stars Ramzan Muhammed, Babu Antony, Narain, Gouri G. Kishan, Aju Varghese, Baiju Santhosh, Althaf Salim, Krishna and Shabareesh Varma. It is produced by Rinish K. N. under the banner Front Row Productions.

== Plot ==
Sahasam focuses on comedy and action and follows the journey of an ordinary individual whose life takes an unexpected turn after a chance encounter sets them on a path filled with unforeseen challenges. As the story unfolds across diverse landscapes, the protagonist is drawn into situations that test their emotional and physical limits. Along the way, they uncover hidden truths, confront personal fears, and cross paths with others whose lives are equally shaped by quiet acts of courage. Through moments of conflict and connection, Sahasam explores how resilience can emerge from the most unlikely circumstances.

== Cast ==
- Narain as Rajeev Nambiar
- Babu Antony as Wolf/ Masthan Bhai
- Ramzan Muhammed as Jeevan
- Hari Sivaram as Pappan
- Shabareesh Varma as Sam
- Yog Japee as Victor Antonio
- Gouri G. Kishan as Sera Issac
- Baiju Santhosh as Babeesh
- Karthik as Luttan
- Bhagath Manuel as Preman
- Sajin Cherukayil as Satheesh A S
- Varsha Ramesh as Isha
- Jeeva Joseph as Rony Zakariya
- Abhimanyu Shammy Tilakan as Kishan
- Krishna as Sanjeev Kumar
- Tessa Joseph as Gayathri Ganesh
- Major Ravi as Sreenivasan
- Vineeth Thattil David as SI Sudharshanan
- Jayashree Sivadhas as Priya
- Jayakrishnan as Jose
- Lishoy as Issac
- Ann Jameela Salim
- Aju Varghese as Music Director Suresh Khan (Cameo Appearance)
- Althaf Salim as KKC (Cameo Appearance)

== Production ==
The film is produced by Front Row Productions. Cinematography was handled by Alby Antony, editing by Kiran Das and the musical score was composed by Bibin Ashok.

== Soundtrack ==
Sahasam

Soundtrack album by Bibin Ashok
- Released: 2025
- Recorded: 2025
- Studios: CAC, Ernakulam; Soundtown, Chennai; My Studio, Ernakulam; Legato Records, Ernakulam; 8th Avenue Records, Kakkanad
- Genre: Feature film soundtrack
- Length: 13:28
- Language: Malayalam
- Label: Saregama
- Producer: Bibin Ashok

Bibin Ashok chronology
Randam Pranaya Mahayudham (2024)	Sahasam (2025)	OK Dear (2025)

The music for Sahasam is composed by Bibin Ashok and lyrics by Vinayak Sasikumar. The Song Onam Moodu has become a trend and has been viewed by around 64 million viewers in YouTube.

No.	Title	Lyrics	Singer(s)	Length
1.	"Onam Mood"	Vinayak Sasikumar	Fejo, Himna Hilari & Hinitha Hilari	03:04
2.	"Santhatha Sakhiye"	Vaisakh Sugunan	K. S. Harisankar	03:15
3.	"Kokkedelic"		The Imbachi & Bhadra Rajin	03:26
4.	"Naruthingal"	Vinayak Sasikumar	Sooraj Santhosh & Chinmayi Sripada	03:43
5.	"Nagarmo"	Vinayak Sasikumar	Kapil Kapilan & Haritha Haribabu	03:50
6.	"Time Bomb"	Vinayak Sasikumar	Anand Sreeraj & Arun Ashok	03:17
Total length:				20:39

== Release ==
=== Theatrical ===
The film released in theatres on 8 August 2025.

=== Home media ===
Sahasam was released digitally through OTT Platforms Amazon Prime, ManoramaMAX and Sun NXT on 1 October 2025.

== Reception ==
=== Critical reception ===
Gopika Is of The Times of India described the film as "a chaotic entertainer that hits the right notes" and rated it 3/5 stars. She wrote that Sahasam "is a comedy of errors with a finishing touch of blood, grime, and crime. Is there a plot? A little. Is there entertainment? Plenty! Sahasam doesn’t boast many acclaimed stars, but everyone in the cast has given their best. The comedy is refreshingly palatable — something not often seen in this genre in recent times."

Vignesh Madhu of The New Indian Express rated the film 1.5/5 stars and wrote a negative review, "The film is loaded with drugs, guns, action, shootouts, car chases, romance, bromance, and more, yet the substandard writing never makes us feel invested. It mistakes lazy, insipid writing for convenience and cinematic liberty, relying excessively on technical gimmicks to inject some energy. But at the end of the day, there's only so much that flashy cinematography and EDM-heavy music can do to cover up for the overall vacuity. It aims at madness, but there's very little method to it."

Swathi P. Ajith of Onmanorama called the film "a chaotic yet enjoyable ride that thrives on its comic cast" and wrote, "Despite these flaws, Sahasam remains an enjoyable watch thanks to its comedic core and spirited performances. It thrives on the energy of its ensemble cast and the sheer unpredictability of its plot. While it may not dig deep emotionally or offer tight storytelling throughout, it delivers enough laughs and chaos to keep audiences entertained."

Gayathri Krishna of OTTPlay rated the film 3/5 stars and wrote, "The humorous performances and story that emerges from turmoil make the entertainer a one-time watch."
