= Pavani Reddy =

Indian model and actress

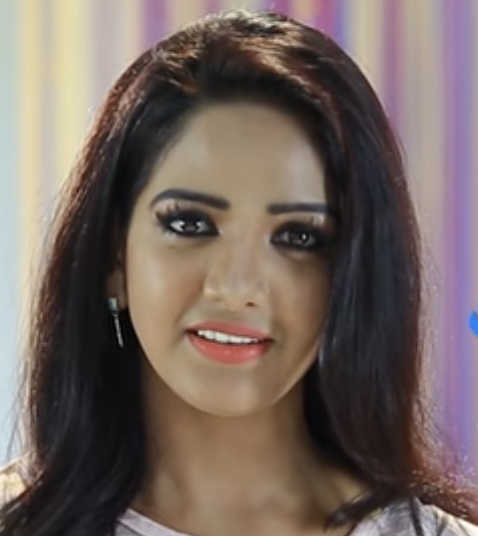
- Pavani Reddy in 2018
- Occupations: Model; Actress
- Years active: 2012–present
- Spouse: Amir Ads (m. 2025)

Pavani Reddy is an Indian actress who predominantly appears in Tamil and Telugu language films. She acted in a supporting role in the Tamil film Thunivu (2023). In 2021, she was a contestant on the reality series Bigg Boss 5 and finished as the 2nd runner up. She is also known for playing the lead in the Tamil-language television series Chinna Thambi.

Pavani made her debut in the Hindi film Login playing the role as Seema. and later acted in various different films such as Amrutham Chandamamalo (2013), Vajram (2015), 465 (2017), Motta Shiva Ketta Shiva (2017), Premaku Raincheck (2018), July Kaatril (2019), Senapathi (2021), Malli Modalaindi (2022) and Thunivu (2023).

== Career ==
Pavani began her career as a model at age 21 before making her silver screen debut with the Hindi film Login in 2012 and later on played a village belle in Rettai Vaal Kuruvi. In 2016, she had also starred in EMI-Thavanai Murai Vazhkai. In 2017, she played the female lead in Chinna Thambi and garnered acclaim for her performance. In 2018, she starred in the Malayalam language television series Neelakkuyil before being replaced by. In 2019, she portrayed one of the leads in Rasaathi, Besides, Pavani has acted in the Malayalam and Telugu TV shows including Neneu Aayana Aruguru Athalalu, Agni Poolu, Naa Peru Meenakshi and Srimathi. Later, she featured in movies like Double Trouble, Vajram, Motta Shiva Ketta Shiva and July Kaatril, to name a few. Pavani featured in the list of Chennai Times - 20 Most Desirable Women on TV 2019. She is a contestant in Bigg Boss (Tamil season 5) in 2021 later emerging as the 2nd runner up.

Pavani appeared in the action film Thunivu (2023). She was cast as a "bank robber" in the film.

== Personal life ==
She began dating Telugu actor Pradeep Kumar in 2016 after appearing in the Tamil television series Pasamalar. The pair were engaged in a ceremony in Hyderabad during late November 2016. She got married on 14 February 2017, marking the Valentine's Day. On 17 May 2017, Pradeep committed suicide and was found dead at his house in Puppalguda, Hyderabad.

In 2022, she is reportedly in relationship with South Indian dancer and choreographer, Amir A D S after being together in Bigg Boss 5 and BB Jodigal 2 . She married Amir on 20 April 2025.

== Filmography ==
Key
| † | Denotes films that have not yet been released |

| Year | Title | Role | Language | Notes |
|---|---|---|---|---|
| 2012 | Login | Seema | Hindi | |
| 2012 | Double Trouble | Priya | Telugu | |
| 2012 | Dream | Neighbor | Telugu | |
| 2013 | Gouravam | Arjun's friend | Tamil / Telugu | |
| 2014 | Amrutham Chandamamalo | Doll Reddy | Telugu | |
| 2014 | The End | Priya | Telugu | |
| 2015 | Vajram | Yazhini | Tamil | |
| 2016 | Lajja | | Telugu | |
| 2016 | Ini Avanea | Kamini | Tamil | |
| 2017 | 465 | Mrs. Jai | Tamil | |
| 2017 | Motta Shiva Ketta Shiva | Abirami | Tamil | |
| 2018 | Premaku Raincheck | Riti | Telugu | |
| 2019 | July Kaatril | Natasha | Tamil | |
| 2019 | Dhrusti | Pavani | Telugu | |
| 2021 | Senapathi | Mahalakshmi "Maha" | Telugu | |
| 2022 | Malli Modalaindi | Vaishali | Telugu | |
| 2023 | Thunivu | Achara | Tamil | |
| 2024 | Chaari 111 | Agent Priya | Telugu | |
| 2025 | Ari: My Name is Nobody | | Telugu | |

=== Television ===
| Year | Program | Role | Network | Language | Notes |
|---|---|---|---|---|---|
| 2014 | Neneu Aayana Aruguru Athalalu | Anasuya | Zee Telugu | Telugu | |
| 2014 | Agni Poolu | - | Gemini TV | Telugu | |
| 2014 | Naa Peru Meenakshi | Swetha | E TV | Telugu | |
| 2015-2017 | Rettai Vaal Kuruvi | Vennilla | Star Vijay | Tamil | Lead Role |
| 2015-2017 | Pasamalar | Bharathi | Sun TV | Tamil | |
| 2016 | EMI-Thavanai Murai Vazhkai | Thara | Sun TV | Tamil | Lead Role |
| 2017-2019 | Chinna Thambi | Nandhini | Star Vijay | Tamil | Lead Role |
| 2018 | Villa To Village | Guest | Star Vijay | Tamil | |
| 2018-2019 | Neelakkuyil | Rani | Asianet | Malayalam | Lead Role |
| 2020-2021 | Srimathi | Sujatha | E TV | Telugu | Lead Role |
| 2020-2021 | Rasaathi | Rasaathi | Sun TV | Tamil | Lead Role |
| 2021–2022 | Bigg Boss Tamil - Season 5 | Contestant | Star Vijay | Tamil | 2nd Runner Up |
| 2022 | BB Jodigal Season 2 | Contestant | Star Vijay | Tamil | Winner (Paired with Amir) |
| 2022 | Oo Solriya Oo Oohm Solriya | Participant | Star Vijay | Tamil | |
| 2022 | Anda Ka Kasam | Participant | Star Vijay | Tamil | |
| 2024 | Super Singer 10 | Guest | Star Vijay | Tamil | |
| 2024 | The Mystery of Moksha Island | Madhavi | Disney + Hotstar | Telugu | |
| 2025 | Om Kali Jai Kali | Bama | Disney + Hotstar | Tamil | |
| TBA | Family Matters | TBA | Disney + Hotstar | Telugu | |

== Awards and nominations ==
Pavani Reddy awards and nominations
Awards and nominations
| Award | Wins | Nominations |

Totals (Note: Certain award groups do not simply award one winner. They acknowledge several different recipients, have runners-up, and have third place. Since this is a specific recognition and is different from losing an award, runner-up mentions are considered wins in this award tally. For simplification and to avoid errors, each award in this list has been presumed to have had a prior nomination.)
- Wins: 1
- Nominations: 5

| Year | Award | Category | Show | Result |
|---|---|---|---|---|
| 2015 | 2nd Vijay Television Awards | Favourite Screen Pair | Rettai Vaal Kuruvi | Nominated |
| 2015 | 2nd Vijay Television Awards | Favourite Find of The Year | Rettai Vaal Kuruvi | Nominated |
| 2018 | 4th Vijay Television Awards | Favourite Actor Female | Chinna Thambi | Nominated |
| 2018 | 4th Vijay Television Awards | Best Pair | Chinna Thambi | Won |
| 2018 | Galatta Nakshathra Awards | Best Pair | Chinna Thambi | Nominated |
