= Thittam Irandu =

2021 film by Vignesh Karthick

- Promotional poster
- Directed by: Vignesh Karthick
- Written by: Vignesh Karthick
- Produced by: Dinesh Kannan; Vinodh Kumar
- Starring: Aishwarya Rajesh; Pavel Navageethan; Gokul Anand
- Cinematography: Gokul Benoy
- Edited by: C S Premkumar
- Music by: Satish Raghunathan
- Production companies: Sixer Entertainment; Mini Studio
- Distributed by: SonyLIV
- Release date: 30 July 2021
- Country: India
- Language: Tamil

Thittam Irandu (transl. Plan B) is a 2021 Indian Tamil-language crime thriller film written and directed by Vignesh Karthick. It is based on Korean film Rainbow Eyes (2007). It is produced by Dinesh Kannan's Sixer Entertainment and Vinod Kumar's Mini Studios. The film stars Aishwarya Rajesh while Pavel Navageethan, Subhash Selvam, Gokul Anand, Ananya Ramprasad, Murali Radhakrishnan, and Subash Selvam appear in pivotal roles. The film was released on 30 July 2021 on the streaming platform SonyLIV.

== Plot ==
Athira, a cop in Chennai, meets Arjun, an aspiring actor, during a bus travel. They both start a relationship and decide to marry after a while. One day, Athira is called to investigate her best friend Deepa Surya's missing case. Surya was married to Kishore, a doctor. Initial investigations point that Surya and her car went missing from her house. Soon enough, Athira finds the burnt-down car and a burnt female skeleton inside it. The autopsy reports show that the skeleton belongs to Surya and the case is believed to be a freak accident. However, Athira has strong suspicions of it being a murder. She finds fingerprints on the burnt car, belonging to one Barani, who is also a suspect in another very similar murder case. Barani is nabbed, and he confesses that both Surya and the other murdered woman were his ex-girlfriends who ruined his life, so he wanted to exact revenge. While accepting that he succeeded in murdering the other woman, Barani also says the attempt to murder Surya was foiled because of a stranger he saw inside her house that day. It is shown that Barani had left his fingerprints accidentally on Surya's car during the scuffle with the stranger, who chased him out of the house.

While Athira and Arjun's wedding arrangements are being planned, Athira is always preoccupied with Surya's case. Further evidences lead Athira to reexamine Surya's corpse. The case takes a bizarre turn when, this time around, the pathologist reports that the victim is not Surya, the entire accident has been staged, and the previous reports were fake. Athira's suspicion now strongly falls on Kishore. When questioned, Kishore says that Surya was forcefully married to him by her parents but she was in love with someone else. Thinking about both of their future and happiness, Kishore sends Surya off to be with her boyfriend. To avoid suspicions from her parents and friends, he staged Surya's death with the help of his friends and faked the autopsy reports using his influence as a doctor. He shows Athira a video proof of Surya living happily with her boyfriend but refuses to disclose their location for safety sake.

To confirm this story, Athira shows the video of Surya and her boyfriend to Barani. But shockingly enough, Barani says that this is not the man he saw in Surya's house, which leads to further confusions as to who the mystery man was. It is then revealed that the mystery man at Surya's house was Arjun. Unaware of this, Athira is still on the lookout, when she gets a text message from Surya asking to meet her in person. Athira goes in search of Surya and Arjun also tags along. When she reaches the location, Surya is nowhere to be seen, and Athira searches the place. She is taken by surprise when Kishore and mutual friends of Athira and Surya confront her suddenly. Coincidentally, Barani finds YouTube videos of Arjun from his acting days and informs Athira that this was the man he saw. Athira is mortified and wonders what is going on, when Arjun reveals a shocking truth, that he is none other than Surya herself. Kishore then explains that Surya was always a transgender man from childhood. He was attracted to women and was interested in becoming a man, but was forced to cover his identity and was forcefully married off. After their wedding, Surya bursts out to Kishore about this problem and tells that he was always in love with Athira, his only friend. He even warded off Barani's proposal because he had considered him only as a friend, but Barani mistook his friendship for love due to Surya's gender identity. Surya expresses his wish to live as a man. Kishore becomes an understanding friend and helps him deal with the situation and supports in his transformation as a man. Surya undergoes the necessary procedures and successfully transforms into Arjun, a man. And this was the real reason why Kishore and his friends had staged the accident as a cover up. Arjun comes clean to Athira and asks her to accept his love for her, as a man. Athira is overwhelmed at the sudden turn of events and miserably leaves without an answer. Despite his attempts to convince her, she cuts off all contacts with Arjun for a while and tries to process this mammoth revelation. One year later, she meets with Arjun with an answer to his proposal, but the viewers are left hanging as to what her decision would have been.

== Cast ==
- Aishwarya Rajesh as Inspector Athira
- Pavel Navageethan as Barani
- Ananya Ramaprasad as Deepa Surya
- Subash Selvam as Arjun
- Gokul Anand as Kishore
- Jeeva Ravi as Abhishek
- Murali Radhakrishnan as Naveen
- Soundarya as Pallavi
- Rekha Suresh as Devi, Surya’s mother

== Reception ==
Naveen Darshan of Cinema Express rated the film 3/5 and called Thittam Irandu "a solid social drama, well-made thriller weighed down by needless red herrings." Saibal Chatterjee of NDTV lauded Aishwarya's performance, writing that her "unwaveringly focused lead performance [..] ensures that the film's rough edges are smoothened out to a certain extent." Deccan Herald reviewer Roktim Rajpal stated that the film lacked a thrilling element that would've kept the narrative engaging. Rajpal, however, appreciated the film's climax, along with the performances and technical aspects.

Sowmya Rajendran writing for The News Minute, awarded the film 2 stars out of 5, and opined that it is "a classic case of good intentions gone horribly wrong." Firstpost critic Ranjani Krishnakumar who rated the film 1.5 out of 5 criticised the makers about being insensitive to spreading misinformation. "The only thing going for the film is that it holds up the suspense until the final reveal," she added. Baradwaj Rangan wrote for Film Companion, "What bothered me most about Thittam Irandu is that nobody seems to even be trying. Everything, including how the plot strands unfold, is very functional and generic. If someone wants to say something, they say just that very thing without trying to sound interesting or dramatic. There's no attempt to make the scenes lively or interesting, and there's a lot of audience-cheating."

M Suganth of The Times of India rated the film 2.5/5 and wrote "Thittam Irandu is largely okayish whodunit with a twist that is definitely something that we don't foresee, but the extent to which this twist works for you will decide how favourably you might look at the movie in the end." Janani K of India Today also gave the movie 2.5 out of 5 stars and wrote "Cinematographer Gokul Benoy's work is quite impressive. Since most of the scenes are shot at the night, the lighting plays a major role and it surely enhanced the feel of the film. Sathish Raghunathan's music and background score were apt for the film." Manoj Kumar R of The Indian Express noted "The grave failing of Vignesh Karthik is that he fails to make the audience care for what's going on in the film."

== Controversies ==
The film sparked controversy due to the inclusion of British YouTuber Jamie Raines (Jammidodger). Raines is a trans man who was featured in the film without his consent, and is misgendered. The film also misrepresents his gender transition as having taken place within a year, despite actually having occurred over "at least a six-year period" according to Raines. Raines attempted to contact the creators of the film, but received no response. Raines later created a YouTube video in response to the film on 10 December 2023, though this video was copyright-claimed by the aforementioned creators and blocked for 98% of Raines's audience.

On 17 September 2024, Raines made a YouTube short reiterating what was said in his previous video, as well as revealing the copyright strike and content block. According to Raines, he has still not received a response from the film's creators. On 16 July 2025, Raines uploaded another video discussing the copyright strike and explaining the situation, but without using material that would once again get his video copyright-claimed.

The film was also criticised by journalist Sowmya Rajendran for using offensive terms such as "biological error" and "natural problems" with regards to transgender individuals, and for casting cisgender actors to play trans characters.
