= Vignesh Karthick =

Indian actor and director

- Born: 18 November 1988 (age 37); Chennai, Tamil Nadu, India
- Education: Sri Lakshmi Ammal Engineering College
- Occupations: Actor, Video and radio jockey, Screenwriter, Cinematographer and Film director
- Years active: 2010 – present
- Spouse: Married (2023)

Vignesh Karthick is an Indian actor, video, radio jockey, screenwriter, cinematographer and film director.

== Career ==
He started his career by acting and directing short films and participating in reality shows, including the comedy game shows like "Athu Ithu Ethu" in STAR Vijay and Comedy Jodies in Zee Thamizh as a stand-up comedian. He later went on to host of those shows, especially the popular shows like Suriya Vanakkam, Thapal Petti En 8484 and many other shows in Sun TV and STAR Vijay, respectively. In 2015, he started to work as a radio jockey with the radio station BIG FM 92.7. In 2016, he made his acting debut in films with Natpadhigaram 79 and in television with Pagal Nilavu. He made his directorial debut in films with Yenda Thalaiyila Yenna Vekkala (2018).

In 2023, he directed the science fiction romantic comedy Adiyae starring G. V. Prakash Kumar in lead role. Helmed by Vignesh Karthick who also plays a fictional filmmaker in the movie Hot Spot (2024) addresses four major societal issues that prompt viewers to question their own concepts of right and wrong, while encouraging introspection regarding the need for change. Following the box office success of Hot Spot 2 Much (2026), director Vignesh Karthick announced that he is making a third instalment in the franchise. The second outing itself hints at the prospect of a third chapter in the series of films.

== Filmography ==
=== Anchor / Participant ===
Year	Show	Role	Channel	Notes
2010	Kalakka Povathu Yaaru?: Season 3	Contestant	STAR Vijay	
2011	Kings of Comedy: Season 1	Contestant	STAR Vijay	
2011	Comedy Jodies	Contestant	Zee Thamizh	
2012-2013	Suriya Vanakkam	Anchor	Sun TV	Part of Virundhinar Pakkam
2012	Imsai Arasargal	Contestant	Polimer	
2012-2013	Galatta Kudumbam	Anchor	Sun TV	
2014	Athu Ithu Ethu	Stand-up Comedian	STAR Vijay	Part of Siricha Pochu
2015-2016	Thabaal Petti Enn 8484	Anchor	STAR Vijay	
2017	Junior Senior	Anchor	Zee Thamizh	

=== Actor ===
Serials

Year	Serial	Role	Channel	Notes
2016-2018	Pagal Nilavu	Karthick Sakthivel	STAR Vijay	Lead Role

Films

Year	Film	Role	Notes
2016	Natpadhigaram 79	Jeeva's friend	
2018	Yenda Thalaiyila Yenna Vekkala	Praveen's friend	Special appearance
2023	Adiyae	Vijay	Special appearance
2024	Hot Spot	Mohammad Sherief	Special appearance
2026	Hot Spot 2 Much	Mohammad Sherief	Special appearance; Segment - The Narration

Short films

Year	Film	Role	Notes
2010	Kurunjeidhi 20	Unemployed youth	
2012	Thazh Thiravai	Agaran	
2014	Thiru Thiru	Thief	
2014	Raja Kaiya Vecha Athu Raanga Ponadhilla		
2015	Suththi	Kathiresan/Jeevanantham	
2015	Mudhal Kanave	Michael	
2015	Raani Aatam	Kumar	
2015	Unnodu Vaaznthaal Varam Allava	Shiva	
2019	Yours Shamefully 2: Dhev Diya	Dhev	
2019	Kallam Peridhu	Divakar	
2020	Yours Shamefully 2.5: Reloaded	Michael	
2020	Vijay Yellam Oru Hero Ah?	Rajasekhar "Raja"	
2020	Yours Unitedly: A Sathankulam Short Film		
2020	Thala Na Yaru? Dhoni Ah? Ajith Ah		
2020	Friendship in Orgasm: A Pasanga Friendship Special Short Film	Sandeep	
2020	Vijay Yellam Oru Hero Ah? 2	Rajasekhar's father	

=== Radio Jockey ===
Year	Show	Role	Channel	Notes
2015-2016	Best of Big Madras Cafe	Host	Big FM 92.7	

=== Director ===
Films

Year	Film
2018	Yenda Thalaiyila Yenna Vekkala
2021	Thittam Irandu
2023	Adiyae
2024	Hot Spot
2026	Hot Spot 2 Much

Short films

Year	Film	Notes
2014	Raja Kaiya Vecha Athu Raanga Ponadhilla	
2015	Mudhal Kanave	
2018	Yours Shamefully	
2019	Yours Shamefully 2: Dhev Diya	
2020	Yours Shamefully 2.5: Reloaded	
2020	Mudhal Kanave 2	
2020	Vijay Yellam Oru Hero Ah?	
2020	Yours Unitedly: A Sathankulam Short Film	
2020	Thala Na Yaru? Dhoni Ah? Ajith Ah	
2020	Friendship in Orgasm: A Pasanga Friendship Special Short Film	
2020	Vijay Yellam Oru Hero Ah? 2	

Web Series

Year	Show	Platform	Notes
2021	Love Lives		
2021	Yours Shamefully 3		Announced

=== Cinematographer ===
Short films

Year	Film	Notes
2020	Mudhal Kanave 2	
2020	Vijay Yellam Oru Hero Ah? 2	

=== Dubbing Artist ===
Year	Film	Notes
2018	Yours Shamefully	Dubbed for Krishna Kumar
2018	Pesuvadhu Kiliya Pennazhagu Mozhiya	Dubbed for The Doctor

== Awards and nominations ==
Year	Award	Category	Work	Result	Notes
2014	Vijay Television Awards	Vijay Television Awards for Favourite Find	Adhu Idhu Edhu	Nominated	
2017	Vijay Television Awards	Vijay Television Awards for Favourite Actor	Pagal Nilavu	Nominated	
2017	Vijay Television Awards	Vijay Television Awards for Favourite Screen Pair	Pagal Nilavu	Nominated	Nominated with Soundarya Bala Nandakumar
2017	South Indian International Movie Awards	Best Short Film	Mudhal Kanave	Won	
2018	Vijay Television Awards	Vijay Television Awards for Favourite Actor	Pagal Nilavu	Nominated	
2018	Vijay Television Awards	Vijay Television Awards for Favourite Screen Pair	Pagal Nilavu	Nominated	Nominated with Soundarya Bala Nandakumar
2018	Arihant Retail Pvt Ltd	Chennaiyin Hot Male	Yours Shamefully	Won	
2018	Zee Thamizh Kudumbam Viruthugal	Best Duo Anchor	Junior Senior	Nominated	Nominated with Kalyani
2019	South Indian International Movie Awards	Best Director	Yours Shamefully	Nominated	
2022	JFW Movie Awards	Best Director in Women Centric Film	Thittam Irandu	Won	
