= Meera Krishna =

Indian actress

- Born: Kerala
- Occupation: Actress
- Years active: 2003 – present
- Spouse: Shiva
- Children: 2

Meera Krishna is an Indian actress known for her work in Malayalam and Tamil television soap operas in lead and supporting roles.

== Filmography ==
Year	Film	Role	Language	Notes
2003	Margam	Prakrithi	Malayalam	Debut film
2004	Manjupoloru Penkutti	Anitha Panicker	Malayalam	

== Television Serials ==
Year	Serial	Role	Language	Channel	Notes
2004–2005	Koodum Thedi		Malayalam	Asianet	
2004–2005	Sthreehridayam	Indhubala	Malayalam	Surya TV	
2004	Veendum Jwalayayi		Malayalam	DD Malayalam	
2005	Maraviyude Manam		Malayalam	Amrita TV	Telefilm
2005–2006	Mukham Ariyathe Katha Ariyathe		Malayalam	Amrita TV	
2007	Daya	Sethulakshmi	Malayalam	Kairali TV	
2007	Prayanam	Devayani	Malayalam	DD Malayalam	Telefilm
2008	St. Antony	Pennamma	Malayalam	Surya TV	
2009	Aagneyam	Prakruthi	Malayalam	DD Malayalam	Kerala State Television Award for Best Actress
2011	Devimahathmyam		Malayalam	Asianet	
2012–2013	Akashadoothu	Krishna	Malayalam	Surya TV	
2012–2013	Pokkisham	Kanmani	Tamil	Kalaignar TV	
2015–2017	Moonumani	Seetha Balachandran	Malayalam	Flowers TV	Replaced by Seena Antony
2018–2020	Nayagi	Vasanthi	Tamil	Sun TV	
2019	Arundhati	Eshwari	Tamil	Sun TV	
2020–2021	Anbudan Kushi	Madhuri Aditya Lal	Tamil	Star Vijay	
2021	Rettai Roja	Seetha and Lakshmi	Tamil	Zee Tamil	Dual Role; Replaced by Seetha Anil
2020–2022	Chithi 2	Malliga	Tamil	Sun TV	Replaced Sirisha Sougandh
2021–2024	Thamizhum Saraswathiyum	Kodhainayagi Natesan	Tamil	Star Vijay	
2021	Pandian Stores	Kodhainayagi Natesan	Tamil	Star Vijay	Mahasangamam with Thamizhum Saraswathiyum
2022–2024	Maari	Devi	Tamil	Zee Tamil	Extended Special Appearance
2022–2025	Karthigai Deepam	Abhirami Nachiyaar	Tamil	Zee Tamil	
2024–present	Kanmani Anbudan	Sivagami	Tamil	Star Vijay	
2024–2025	Meenu's Kitchen	Parvathy	Malayalam	Mazhavil Manorama	
2025	Ponni	Raajamani and Sivagami	Tamil	Star Vijay	Dual role; Mahasangamam with Kanmani Anbudan
2025–2026	Chellame Chellame	Deivanai	Tamil	Sun TV	
2026	Parijatham	Doctor Narmada	Tamil	Zee Tamil	Special appearance
2026–Present	Ivar Vivahitharayal	Sangeetha Das	Malayalam	Asianet	

== Awards ==
- 2003 : Kerala State Film Award – Special Jury Award - Margam
- 2010: Kerala State Television Award for Best Actress -Agneyam
- 2019:Sun Kudumbam Viruthugal - Best Mother - Nayagi
- 2022:Sun Kudumbam Viruthugal- Best Villi- Chithi 2
- 2023: Zee Kudumbam Awards-Best Mamiyar - Karthigai deepam
- 2024:Ananda Vikatan TV awards - Best Mamiyar - Karthigai deepam
- 2024: Zee Kudumbam Awards-Best Amma - Karthigai deepam
