= Thalattu (TV series) =

Indian television series

- Genre: Family; Soap opera
- Directed by: Harish Adhithya (1-310); A.Ramachandran (311-537); Justin Jeyaraj (538–704)
- Starring: Krishna Raghunandan, Shruthi Raj, Sri Latha
- Opening theme: "Thalattu"; Saindhavi (Vocals)
- Country of origin: India
- Original language: Tamil
- No. of seasons: 1
- No. of episodes: 720

Production
- Producer: Shankar Venkataraman
- Production location: Tamil Nadu
- Cinematography: Banumurugan; Vijayapaandi
- Running time: Approximately 22-24 minutes per episode
- Production companies: Sun Entertainment; Shak Studios

Original release
- Network: Sun TV
- Release: 26 April 2021 – 24 June 2023

Thalattu (transl. Lullaby) is an Indian Tamil-language family drama series starring Krishna Raghunandan , Shruthi Raj and Sri Latha. It premiered on Sun TV on 26 April 2021 and ended on 24 June 2023 with 720 episodes and available for worldwide streaming on Sun NXT. This show replaced Nila (TV series) and was replaced by Pudhu Vasantham (TV series).

== Plot ==
The plot of Thalattu follows Vijayakrishnan (Krishna Raghunandan), who has never experienced the love of a mother as he was separated from her at a young age. Despite having a loving family with his wife Isaipriya (Shruthi Raj), Vijay (Krishna Raghunandan) feels a void in his life due to the absence of his mother. However, when his mother enters their home as a maid, Vijay (Krishna Raghunandan)'s life takes a drastic turn. Will Isaipriya (Shruthi Raj) be able to reunite mother and son? That is the central conflict of the story.

Meanwhile, Isaipriya (Shruthi Raj) faces challenges of her own as her father rejects her for marrying Vijay (Krishna Raghunandan). Despite this, she manages to overcome all obstacles with her kindness and empathy, especially towards Thayamma (Sri Latha), who works as a maid in their home and happens to be Vijay (Krishna Raghunandan)'s real mother. Thayamma (Sri Latha) also has an adopted daughter named Terasa (Tharshika Dinesh).

== Cast ==
=== Main ===
- Shruthi Raj as Isaipriya (Isai) Eshwarmoorthy Vijayakrishnan
- Krishna (TV actor) as Vijayakrishnan (Vijay) Sundaramoorthy* as young Vijayakrishnan
- Sri Latha as Thayamma Sundaramoorthy
- Sarvesh Raghav as Sundar Vijayakrishnan
- Dharani as Sivagami Muthaiah (Main Antagonist)
- Rishi Keshav replacement Pollachi Babu as Muthaiah(Main Antagonist)
- Sridevi Ashok as Mayuri (Main Antagonist)

=== Supporting ===
- Tharshika Dinesh as Theresa Surya
- Vigneshwaran as Surya, Theresa's husband and Krishnaveni's son
- Sahana Shetty as Devi (Antagonist)
- Vineeth Sundaram as Praveen Kumar "Praveen" (Devi's love interest)
- Bharatha Naidu as Kokila Manikandan
- Suresh Joshua as Manikandan "Mani"
- Mohan Sharma as Advocate Eshwara Moorthy (Isai's father)
- Sunitha Srinivasan as Vidhya Balachandran (Isai's best friend)
- Nathan Shyam replacement Ashwin Kumar as Balachandran (Vidhya's husband)
- K. S. Jayalakshmi as Balachandran's mother
- Karpagavalli as Krishnaveni
- Arunkumar Padmanabhan as Advocate Vaali
- Shravan Dwaraganath replacement VM Rajesh Kanna as Rudhramoorthy "Rudhran"
- Nithya Ravindran as Peri Aayi
- Nila Gracy as Bhavani
- Vincent Roy as Sambasivam
- Meenakshi as Meenakshi
- Navindhar as Sukumar Sambasivam
- VJ Malar replacement VJ Mounika as Thaara (deaceased)
- Rekha Angelina as Vasanthi
- Yaar Kannan as Siluvai
- Sri Kala as Devika
- Tina as Abi

=== Special appearances ===
- Santhosh as Young Sundaramoorthy (deceased)
- Sandra Babu as Young Thayamma Sundaramoorthy
- Haripriya Isai as Young Sivagami Muthaiah
- Kiran replacement Bala Komaiah as Young Muthaiah
- Delhi Ganesh as Ganapathy Gurukkal
- K. S. G. Venkatesh as Thirugnanasambandar
- Ganesh Venkatraman as Aravind
- Anuradha Krishnamoorthy as Vasundhara IAS
- Eshwar Ragunathan as Eshwar
- Lavanya as Lakshmi Eshwar

== Adaptations ==
Language	Title	Original release	Network(s)	Last aired	Notes
Tamil	Thalattu தாலாட்டு	26 April 2021	Sun TV	24 June 2023	Original
Bengali	Amar Shona Chader Kona আমার সোনা চান্দের কোনা	28 March 2022	Sun Bangla	17 September 2022	Remake
Kannada	Ratha Sapthami ರಥ ಸಪ್ತಮಿ	3 November 2025	Udaya TV	Ongoing	Original
