= Sruthi Raj =

Indian actress

- Other names: Laksi, Sonu, Preethi
- Occupation: Actress
- Years active: 1995–present

Sruthi Raj is an Indian film and television actress. She has acted in a few Kannada, Malayalam, Telugu, and Tamil films before moving on to act in Tamil TV serials. She is known for her leading roles in the popular Tamil TV serials Thendral, Office, Azhagu, and Thalattu.

== Career ==
Sruthi co-starred as Vijay's college mate in the movie Maanbumigu Maanavan in the year 1996. Srilata, a veteran Malayalam comedy actress, passed Sruthi's photo to director K. G. George, who was on the lookout for a fresh teenager, to act alongside Mammootty and Khushbu in Elavamkodu Desam. After acting in this film, she co-starred in Udayapuram Sulthan and Priyam. At the same time, she also entered the Telugu market through the films Veedekkadi Mogudandi? and O Chinadana.

In 2004, her single lead release was Kadhal Dot Com. She went on to do lead roles in Manthiran and Jerry. However, none of her movies shined at the box office and she went unnoticed on account of it.

In 2009, she turned her attention towards small-screen and began her career in the television industry: Thendral, Sun TV's prime time serial, directed by S.Kumaran, became her first project. She, then, acted in Vijay TV's workplace drama Office. She continues to act in lead roles in serials, notably Azhagu Thalattu and Lakshmi on Sun TV.

== Filmography ==
Year	Title	Role	Language	Notes
1995	Agrajan	Jancy	Malayalam	
1996	Maanbumigu Maanavan	Priya	Tamil	
1998	Aanappara Achamma	-	Malayalam	Unreleased
1998	Ini Ellam Sugame	Nirmala	Tamil	Credited as Lakshi
1998	Andaman	Monisha	Kannada	Credited as Soni
1998	Elavamkodu Desam	Nandhini	Malayalam	
1999	Udayapuram Sulthan	Sreelakshmi	Malayalam	
2000	Priyam	Nancy	Malayalam	
2000	Varavaay	Veni	Malayalam	
2000	Sulthan	Manga	Kannada	
2000	Brahma Vishnu	Shruti	Kannada	
2001	Halappa	Shanthi	Kannada	
2001	Dosth	Chinju	Malayalam	
2001	Veedekkadi Mogudandi?	Shruti	Telugu	
2002	O Chinadana	Divya	Telugu	
2003	War and Love	Shabana	Malayalam	
2004	Kadhal Dot Com	Priya	Tamil	
2005	Manthiran	Abhi	Tamil	
2006	Jerry	Janaki	Tamil	
2008	Iyakkam	Sarasu	Tamil	

== Television ==
Serials

Year	Title	Role	Language	Channel	Notes
2009–2015	Thendral	Thulasi	Tamil	Sun TV	
2011	Thirumathi Selvam	Thulasi	Tamil	Sun TV	Crossover episode in Thirumathi Selvam andThendral
2011–2012	Shravani Subramanyam	Shravani	Telugu	Gemini TV	
2013–2015	Office	Rajalakshmi aka Raji	Tamil	Star Vijay	
2015–2016	Annakodiyum Aindhu Pengalum	Gowri	Tamil	Zee Tamil	
2015–2018	Apoorva Raagangal	Pavithira	Tamil	Sun TV	
2018–2020	Azhagu	Sudha	Tamil	Sun TV	
2021–2023	Thalattu	Isaipriya	Tamil	Sun TV	
2021	Kannana Kanne	Isaipriya	Tamil	Sun TV	Special Appearance
2022	Aruvi	Herself	Tamil	Sun TV	Special Appearance
2022	Priyamana Thozhi	Isaipriya	Tamil	Sun TV	Special Appearance
2022	Ilakkiya	Mahalakshmi	Tamil	Sun TV	Special Appearance
2024–present	Lakshmi	Mahalakshmi	Tamil	Sun TV	

Shows

Year	Title	Role	Language	Channel
2020	Vanakkam Tamizha	Guest	Tamil	Sun TV
2021	Vanakkam Tamizha	Guest	Tamil	Sun TV
2021	Poova Thalaya	Contestant	Tamil	Sun TV
2021	Vanakkam Tamizha	Guest	Tamil	Sun TV
2022	Maathi Yosi	Contestant	Tamil	Sun TV
2022	Vanakkam Tamizha	Guest	Tamil	Sun TV
2022	Mathappu Mamiyar Pattas Marumagal	Isaipriya	Tamil	Sun TV
2022	Vanakkam Tamizha	Guest	Tamil	Sun TV
2022	Super Samayal	Contestant	Tamil	Sun TV
2023	Puthandu Aasai	Isaipriya	Tamil	Sun TV
