= Hot Spot (2024 film) =

2024 anthology film by Vignesh Karthick

- Theatrical release poster
- Directed by: Vignesh Karthick
- Written by: Vignesh Karthick
- Produced by: K. J. Balamanimarbhan; Suresh Kumar; Gokul Benoy
- Starring: Kalaiyarasan; Sofia; Sandy; Ammu Abhirami; Janani; Gouri G. Kishan; Subash; Adithya Bhaskar
- Cinematography: Gokul Benoy
- Edited by: Muthayan U.
- Music by: Satish Raghunathan; Vaan
- Production companies: KJB Talkies; Seven Warrior Films; Sixer Entertainment; Veyilon Entertainment
- Release date: 29 March 2024
- Country: India
- Language: Tamil

Hot Spot is a 2024 Indian Tamil-language anthology film directed by Vignesh Karthick and starring Kalaiyarasan, Sofia, Sandy, Ammu Abhirami, Janani, Gouri G. Kishan, Subash and Adithya Bhaskar. The film was released on 29 March 2024 to positive reviews from critics but performed poorly at the box office.

== Plot ==
The story revolves around four characters struggling to win their love.

== Cast ==
Happy Married Life	Golden Rules	Thakkali Chutney	Fame Game
Gouri G. Kishan as Dhanya; Adithya Bhaskar as Vijay	Sandy as Siddharth; Ammu Abhirami as Deepti	Janani as Anitha; Subash as Vetri	Kalaiyarasan as Ezhumalai; Sofia as Lakshmi

- K. J. Balamanimarbhan as himself, a fictional film producer
- Vignesh Karthick as Mohammad Sherief, a fictional filmmaker

== Soundtrack ==
The music was composed by Satish Raghunathan and Vaan.

Track listing
No.	Title	Lyrics	Music	Singer(s)	Length
1.	"Aiyayayo"	Vignesh Ramakrishna	Vaan	Kaber Vasuki	2:27
2.	"What is Kalaacharam"	Maatheevan	Satish Raghunathan	Malathy Lakshman	3:23
3.	"What is Kalaacharam Reprise"	Maatheevan	Satish Raghunathan	Malathy Lakshman	2:52
Total length:					8:42

== Critical reception ==
Roopa Radhakrishnan from The Times of India rated the film three out of five stars and wrote that "All in all, Hot Spot features three stories that are humorously evocative and a fourth one [Fame Game] that's deeply disturbing". Jayabhuvaneshwari B from Cinema Express gave the film the same rating and wrote that "The overall film experience, however, is a mixed bag. We're left with plenty to think about, but the flaws are undeniable and linger on long after the credits roll". Manigandan KR from Times Now gave the film the same rating and wrote that "In all, Hot Spot is a feminist film that raises more questions than it provides answers".
