= Super Singer 7 =

Tamil singing competition

- Season 7
- Presented by: Priyanka Deshpande; Makapa Anand
- Judges: P. Unnikrishnan; Anuradha Sriram; Shweta Mohan; Benny Dayal
- No. of episodes: 57

Release
- Original network: Star Vijay
- Original release: 27 April – 10 November 2019

Season chronology
- ← Previous; Super Singer 6 Next → Super Singer 8

Asian Paints Super Singer 7 is a 2019 Indian Tamil language Reality singing competition show, the seventh season of the Super Singer show, which aired on Star Vijay on every Saturday and Sunday at 20:00 (IST) starting from 27 April 2019.Asian Paints sponsored for the season.

The show was hosted by Makapa Anand and Priyanka Deshpande once again. The Judges of the show were the popular playback singers P. Unnikrishnan, Anuradha Sriram, Shweta Mohan and Benny Dayal. Music Director Anirudh Ravichander was the Brand Ambassador of the season. The winner will be given a chance to sing in an Anirudh's musical on a feature film.

The finalists include Punya, Murugan, Vikram, Gowtham and Sam Vishal. The Grand Finale was held on 10 November 2019 at Codissia Trade Fair Complex, Coimbatore and it was live telecasted from 3:30 pm onwards on Vijay TV. Murugan was declared as the winner. Vikram was second. Sam Vishal and Punya were tied for the third place. At the grand finale Anirudh announced that he will also be giving a chance to Sam Vishal and Punya to sing under his composition.

== Hosts ==
- Priyanka Deshpande
- Makapa Anand

== Main Judges ==
Following four returned as Judge for the seventh season

- P. Unnikrishnan
- Anuradha Sriram
- Shweta Mohan
- Benny Dayal

== Contestants ==
  - Murugan aka Mookuthi Murugan (Anuradha and Unnikrishnan team) was declared the Winner of the Super Singer Season 7 and received a 5 million worth house by Arun Excello.
  - Vikram (Anuradha and Unnikrishnan team) was the first runner up of the season and was awarded 2.5 million gold by Gold one.
  - Sam Vishal (Anuradha and Unnikrishnan team) who got the highest number of public votes emerged as the second runner up of the season along with Punya (Shweta and Benny team) who was getting the highest scores in all rounds of the season and even in the grand finale.
  - Gowtham (Shweta and Benny team) was the third runner up of the season. He was initially eliminated from the show at Top 5, he came back as a wild card contestant.

Name	Hometown	Total No. of battles (Till 'The Final Fight')	No. of battles Won	No. of battles Lost	Notes
Mookuthi Murugan	Dharmapuri, Tamil Nadu	18	11 (1 tie)	6	Winner
Vikram Sai Prasad	Tiruvarur, Tamil Nadu	18	11	7	1st Runner-up
Sam Vishal	Thanjavur, Tamil Nadu	18	14	4	2nd Runner-up
Punya Selva	London, United Kingdom	18	14 (1 tie)	3	2nd Runner-up
Gowtham	Thoothukudi, Tamil Nadu	18	12	6	3rd Runner-up
Sivaangi (Anuradha and Unnikrishnan team)	Thodupuzha, Kerala	18	9	9	Evicted on 05 October 2019 (Top 06)
Vaisakhan (Shweta and Benny team)	Thiruvananthapuram, Kerala	19	9	10	Evicted on 28 September 2019 (Top 07)
Mufeeda Majeed (Shweta and Benny team)	Kozhikode, Kerala	19	8	11	Evicted on 21 September 2019 (Top 08)
Suganthi (Anuradha and Unnikrishnan team)	Tamil Nadu	15	6	9	Evicted on 07 September 2019 (Top 09)
Roshini (Shweta and Benny team)	United States	15	5	10	Evicted on 31 August 2019 (Top 10)
Parthiban (Shweta and Benny team)	Cuddalore, Tamil Nadu	12	5	7	Evicted on 17 August 2019 (Top 11)
Kannagi (Anuradha and Unnikrishnan team)	Tamil Nadu	12	4	8	Evicted on 10 August 2019 (Top 12)
Sahana (Anuradha and Unnikrishnan team)	Chennai, Tamil Nadu	10	4	6	Evicted on 27 July 2019 (Top 13)
Guna (Anuradha and Unnikrishnan team)	Chennai, Tamil Nadu	8	2	5	Evicted on 13 July 2019 (Top 14)
Poornima (Anuradha and Unnikrishnan team)	Chennai, Tamil Nadu	7	3	1	Evicted on 06 July 2019 (Top 15)
Lakshmi Priya (Shweta and Benny team)	Neyveli, Tamil Nadu	6	1	5	Evicted on 29 June 2019 (Top 16)
Sindhuja (Shweta and Benny team)	Tiruchirappalli, Tamil Nadu	5	1	4	Evicted on 22 June 2019 (Top 17)
Abhinav (Shweta and Benny team)	Kumbakonam, Tamil Nadu	4	1	3	Evicted on 15 June 2019 (Top 18)
Yogi Sekar (Anuradha and Unnikrishnan team)	Viluppuram, Tamil Nadu	3	1	2	Evicted on 08 June 2019 (Top 19)
Soujanya (Shweta and Benny team)	Visakhapatnam, Andhra Pradesh	2	1	1	Evicted on 01 June 2019 (Top 20)

== Main competition ==
The main competition comprised a series of performance rounds on successive weeks, from 18 May 2019 to 22 September 2019, with occasional break weeks. Typically each round had two episodes telecasted on Saturday and Sunday, with 1 contestant who lost the battle with least marks from each of the two teams being nominated to the danger zone at the end of the last episode that week. The contestants in the danger zone are handed over to the public audience, where people vote for the contestant whom they wish to be continued in the show. Based on public votes one contestant with lesser votes gets eliminated in the first episode of each week. On few occasions, there were no nominations for danger zone. Each judge, based on the performances of the contestants give marks in a total of 10 points.

=== Duet Challenge ===
Performances : This round required 2 contestants from each team to perform a single song.

Episodes : 07 & 08

Key

Won the Battle
Lost the Battle

Battle

Air Date	Anuradha and Unnikrishnan team	Song	Film	Shweta and Benny team	Song	Film
18–19 May 2019	Vikram and Sahana	'Udhaya Udhaya'	Udhaya	Lakshmi Priya and Sindhuja	'Vandhen Vandhen'	Panchatanthiram
18–19 May 2019	Sam Vishal and Purnima	'Kadhal Ara Onnu'	Vaayai Moodi Pesavum	Roshini and Abhinav	'Aalana Naal Muthala'	Kaadhal Kavithai
18–19 May 2019	Mufeeda and Kannagi	'Kuruva Nella Sorakki'		Gowtham and Soujanya	'En Mel Vizhunda'	May Maadham
18–19 May 2019	Yogi and Guna	'Danga Maari Oodhari'	Anegan	Punya and Vaisakhan	'Pookal Pookum'	Madrasapattinam
18–19 May 2019	Murugan and Sivaangi	'Raja Raja Maharaja'	Navarathri	Parthiban and Suganthi	'Mama Mama'	Kumudham

=== Solo Competition Round ===
Performances : The contestants give ace performances and a tough fight in their first solo competitive performance.

Episodes : 09 & 10

Key

Won the Battle
Lost the Battle

Battle

Air Date	Anuradha and Unnikrishnan team	Song	Film	Shweta and Benny team	Song	Film
25–26 May 2019	Yogi	'Yethi Yethi'	Vaaranam Aayiram	Vaisakhan	'Thom Karuvil'	Star
25–26 May 2019	Sahana	'Vedham Anuvil'	Sagara Sangamam	Suganthi	'Machan Machan'	
25–26 May 2019	Sam Vishal	'Usuru Narambula'	Irudhi Suttru	Soujanya	'Doothu Varuma'	Kaakha Kaakha
25–26 May 2019	Guna	'All Your Duty'	Goli Soda	Sindhuja	'Gala Gala Vena'	Rhythm
25–26 May 2019	Sivaangi	'Kannu Kaatu'	Rekka	Punya	'Irumbile Oru'	Enthiran
25–26 May 2019	Mufeeda	'Oru Sanam'	Mella Thirandhathu Kadhavu	Parthiban	'Maanuthu Mandhayile'	Kizhakku Cheemayile
25–26 May 2019	Kannagi	'Enna Peththa Magane'		Abhino	'Nanbanukku Koila'	Kanchana 3
25–26 May 2019	Purnima	'Athan Varuvaga'	Dum Dum Dum	Roshini	'Maalayil Yaaro'	Chatriyan
25–26 May 2019	Vikram	'Anbae Anbae'	Jeans	Gowtham	'Mambalam Vikira'	Nenjirukkum Varai
25–26 May 2019	Murugan	'Kadhal Vanthiruchu'	Kalyanaraman	Lakshmi Priya	'Nenjodu Kalanthidu'	Kaadhal Kondein

=== Devotional Songs Round ===
Performances : It's an array of performances by the contestants of the show where they sing Devotional songs.

Judges : Renowned singers T. L. Maharajan, Subha and Sowmya join the judging panel along with Anuradha, Unnikrishnan and Shweta Mohan on the special occasion

Episodes : 11 & 12

Key

Won the Battle
Lost the Battle

Battle

Air Date	Anuradha and Unnikrishnan team	Song	Shweta and Benny team	Song
8–9 June 2019	Mufeeda	'Iraivan Thandha Iniya Varam'	Parthiban	'Sollatha Naal Illai'
8–9 June 2019	Guna	'Iraivan Yesuvai Boomiku Thantha'	Vaisakhan	'Thiruppar Kadalil'
8–9 June 2019	Kannagi	'Gangai Amman'	Suganthi	'Yedu Thandhanadi Thillaiyile'
8–9 June 2019	Murugan	'Kannan Vandhan Ange'	Roshini	'Maatha Un Kovilil'
8–9 June 2019	Sivaangi	'Azhagan Muruganidam'	Lakshmi Priya	'Oru Thaali Varam'
8–9 June 2019	Sam Vishal	'Shakthi Kodu'	Abino	'Thaayama Maariya'
8–9 June 2019	Sahana	'Kai Veenaiyai'	Punya	'Mukundha Mukundha'
8–9 June 2019	Purnima	'Sola Chola Inikkuthada'	Sindhuja	'Om Namashivaya'
8–9 June 2019	Yogi	'Guruve Saranam'	Gowtham	'Om Shivoham'
8–9 June 2019	Vikram was given rest for that particular week.			

Asian Paints' Wall of Fame : Murugan

=== Get – Up Round ===
Performances : The contestants dress-up themselves based on the songs chosen and compete with some spectacular performances.

Episodes : 13 & 14

Key

Won the Battle
Lost the Battle

Battle

Air Date	Anuradha and Unnikrishnan team	Song	Film	Shweta and Benny team	Song	Film
25–26 May 2019	Purnima	'Othaiyila Ninnathena'	Vanaja Girija	Gowtham	'Annaatha Aadurar'	Apoorva Sagodharargal
25–26 May 2019	Kannagi	'Maruvathooril Iruppavale'		Sindhuja	'Yelantha Pazham'	Panama Pasama
25–26 May 2019	Vikram	'Isai Tamizh'	Thiruvilaiyadal	Parthiban	'Samarasam Ulavum'	Rambaiyin Kaadhal
25–26 May 2019	Sam Vishal	'Ennodu Nee Irudhal'	I (film)	Abhino	'Valameenukkum'	Chithiram Pesuthadi
25–26 May 2019	Sivaangi	'Raa Raa'	Chandramukhi	Vaisakhan	'O Sukumaari'	Anniyan
25–26 May 2019	Guna	'Vaadi Potta Pulla'	Kaalam Maari Pochu	Lakshmi Priya	'Pandiyan Naan'	Thillana Mohanambal
25–26 May 2019	Sahana	'Paalaķaatu Pakathile'	Yaaradi Nee Mohini	Roshini	'Rukku Rukku'	Avvai Shanmughi
25–26 May 2019	Mufeeda	'Kannalane'	Bombay	Suganthi	'Teya Mynaa'	
25–26 May 2019	Murugan	'Kalyana Ponnu'	Padagotti	Punya	'Kettele Ange'	Bhadrakali

Best Performer & Wall of Fame : Roshini

Best Entertainer : Punya

=== The Performance Round ===
Performances : The contestants put on a slew of energetic acts and take the battle to another level with their power-packed performances.

Episodes : 15 & 16

Key

Won the Battle
Lost the Battle

Battle

Air Date	Anuradha and Unnikrishnan team	Song	Film	Shweta and Benny team	Song	Film
16–17 June 2019	Sam Vishal	'Urvasi Urvasi'	Kaadhalan	Roshini	'Shakalaka Baby'	Mudhalvan
16–17 June 2019	Sahana	'Aasa Dosai'	Paramasivan	Parthiban	'Vandiyile Nellu'	Kidaari
16–17 June 2019	Murugan	'Meenatchi Meenatchi'	Anantha Poongatre	Sindhuja	'Allegro'	Kanthaswamy
16–17 June 2019	Kannagi	'Kozhi Kuruma'		Vaisakhan	'Kacheri Kacheri'	Kacheri Arambam
16–17 June 2019	Vikram	'Thirupathi Ezhumalai'	Ninaivirukkum Varai	Gowtham	'Madura Kulunga'	Subramaniapuram
16–17 June 2019	Purnima	'Vachikkava'	Nallavanukku Nallavan	Lakshmi Priya	'Sarakku Vechirukken'	Shahjahan
16–17 June 2019	Guna	'Sanki Monkey'	MGR Sivaji Rajini Kamal	Suganthi	'Vanthana Vanthana'	Tharai Thappattai
16–17 June 2019	Mufeeda	'Athiradi Kaaran'	Sivaji: The Boss	Punya	'Manmatha Raasa'	Thiruda Thirudi
16–17 June 2019	Sivaangi was given rest for that particular week.					

Best Performer & Wall of Fame : Punya

Best Entertainer : Gowtham

=== Pattanam vs Pattikada Round ===
Performance : Pattanam vs Pattikada (City vs Village), a contestant from each team battles on a topic based on how it happens in a city and in a village and deliver their performance in the form of a song.

Episodes : 17 & 18

Key

Won the Battle
Lost the Battle

Battle

Air Date	Anuradha and Unnikrishnan team	Song	Film	Shweta and Benny team	Song	Film
22–23 June 2019	Sivaangi	'Strawberry Kanne '	Minsara Kanavu	Gowtham	'Adi Ennadi Rakkamma'	Pattikada Pattanama
22–23 June 2019	Vikram	'Oru Mani Adithal'	Kaalamellam Kaathiruppen	Suganthi	'Machana Pathingla'	Annakili
22–23 June 2019	Murugan	'Devadasum Naanum'	Vidhi	Parthiban	'Vazhvana Vazhvenaku'	Idaya Kovil
22–23 June 2019	Purnima	'Mayya Mayya'	Guru	Roshini	'Ponmeni Urugudhe'	Moondram Pirai
22–23 June 2019	Sam Vishal	'Ennadi Maayavi Nee'	Vada Chennai	Lakshmi Priya	'Inji Iduppazhaga'	Thevar Magan
22–23 June 2019	Guna	'Vaazhaiyadi Vaazhaiya'		Punya	'Yaro Yarodi'	Alaipayuthey
22–23 June 2019	Sahana	'Azhagae Sugama'	Paarthale Paravasam	Mufeeda	'Nenje Nenje'	Ratchagan
22–23 June 2019	Kannagi	'Kodi Malar There'		Vaisakhan	'Pennala Pennala'	Uzhavan

Best Performer & Wall of Fame : Roshini

Best Entertainer : Purnima

=== Latest Songs Round ===
Episodes : 19 & 20

Key

Won the Battle
Lost the Battle

Battle

Air Date	Anuradha and Unnikrishnan team	Song	Film	Shweta and Benny team	Song	Film
29–30 June 2019	Sahana	'Aaha Kaadhal'	Moondru Per Moondru Kadal	Gowtham	'Tamilselvi'	Remo
29–30 June 2019	Vikram	'Kurumba'	Tik Tik Tik	Vaisakhan	'Raasali'	Achcham Yenbadhu Madamaiyada
29–30 June 2019	Kannagi	'Achuvela Naavaada'		Punya	'Vaan Varuvaan'	Kaatru Veliyidai
29–30 June 2019	Sivaangi	'Aye Mr. Minor'	Kaaviya Thalaivan	Mufeeda	'Kalvare Kalvare'	Raavanan
29–30 June 2019	Purnima	'Karuva Kaatu'	Marudhu	Parthiban	'Maane Maane'	Uriyadi
29–30 June 2019	Guna	'Papara Mittai'	RK Nagar	Roshini	'Mental Manadhil'	O Kadhal Kanmani
29–30 June 2019	Murugan	'Aavi Parakkum'	Rajinimurugan	Suganthi	'Vaadi Raasathi'	36 Vayadhinile
29–30 June 2019	Sam Vishal was given rest for that particular week.					

Best Performer & Wall of Fame : Suganthi

Best Entertainer : Kannagi

=== Star Wars Round ===
Performance : The contestants showcase their talents. The singing sensations of the previous seasons join the show to support the contestants and sing along with them.

Judges : Singers Kalpana, S. P. Charan and K. S. Chithra joined the judging panel along with Anuradha, Unnikrishnan and Shweta Mohan for the Star Wars Round.

Episodes : 21 & 22

Key

Won the Battle
Lost the Battle

Battle

Air Date	Anuradha and Unnikrishnan team		Song	Film	Shweta and Benny team		Song	Film
Air Date	SS Star	Contestant	Song	Film	SS Star	Contestant	Song	Film
6–7 July 2019	Shravan	Sahana	'Ragasiyamaai'	Dumm Dumm Dumm	Rakshita	Punya	'Nangai'	Engeyum Kadhal
6–7 July 2019	Syed Subahan	Sam Vishal	'Andha Arabi Kadaloram'	Bombay	Sreekanth	Mufeeda	'Boom Boom'	Boys
6–7 July 2019	Shenbaraj	Kannagi	'Attha Magane'		Saisharan	Parthiban	'Kannukulle Oruthi'	Dhill
6–7 July 2019	Sathyaprakash	Sivaangi	'Naane Varugiren'	O Kadhal Kanmani	Rajaganapathy	Roshini	'Hey Vaada Vaada'	Kacheri Arambam
6–7 July 2019	Senthil	Guna	'White Lakkan Kozhi'	Priyamudan	Rajalaksmi	Suganthi	'Rettachada Pola'	
6–7 July 2019	Priyanka NK	Vikram	'Aayiram Nilave'	Adimai Penn	Srinisha	Gowtham	'Laala Kadai'	Saravanan Irukka Bayamaen
6–7 July 2019	Anand Aravindakshan	Murugan	'Kaasikku'	Chandrodayam	Malavika	Vaisakhan	'Thadakku Thadakku'	Aathi

Best Performer & Wall of Fame : Sivaangi

Best Entertainer : Punya

=== The Folk Songs Round ===
Performances : The contestants bring on festive vibes and leave the audience in splits with their traditional performances. Contestants scoring 58 and above out of 60 gets a chance to choose their opponent in the upcoming Big Battle Round.

Judges : Singers Mano, Subha and Anthony Daasan join the judging panel along with Anuradha, Unnikrishnan and Shweta Mohan.

Episodes : 23 & 24

Key

Won the Battle
Lost the Battle

*	Contestants with 58 and above marks out of 60

Battle

Air Date	Anuradha and Unnikrishnan team	Song	Film	Shweta and Benny team	Song	Film/Album
13–14 July 2019	Sivaangi	'Sandiyare Sandiyare'	Virumaandi	Suganthi	'Eppo Varuva Nee'	Anthony Dasan Paadalgal
13–14 July 2019	Murugan*	'Katta Vandi'	Sakalakala Vallavan	Parthiban	'Odakar Orathula'	Anthony Dasan Paadalgal
13–14 July 2019	Sahana	'Porale Ponnuthayi'	Karuthamma	Vaisakhan	'Adi Gana'	Poonthotta Kaavalkaaran
13–14 July 2019	Kannagi*	'Maane Pulli Maane'		Mufeeda	'Kotta Paakkum'	Nattamai
13–14 July 2019	Sam Vishal	'Oorana Oorukulla'	Manam Kothi Paravai	Punya	'Naan Pudikum'	Mundhanai Mudichu
13–14 July 2019	Vikram	'Ennoda Raasi Nalla'	Mappillai	Roshini*	'Senthil Vadivelava'	
13–14 July 2019	Gowtham was given rest for that particular week.					

Best Performer & Wall of Fame : Murugan

Best Entertainer : Roshini

=== The Big Battle Round ===
Performances: The young participants engage in the competition with high-energy performances.

Roshini, Kannagi and Murugan battle with their chosen opponents Sam Vishal, Vaisakhan and Punya respectively.

Episodes : 25 & 26

Key

Won the Battle
Lost the Battle

Battle

Air Date	Anuradha and Unnikrishnan team	Song	Film	Shweta and Benny team	Song	Film
20–21 July 2019	Kannagi	'Onnum Ketta Pola'		Vaisakhan	'Paattum Naane'	Thiruvilaiyadal
20–21 July 2019	Vikram	'Vandhame Chandra Bimbamo'	Sivakavi	Mufeeda	'Pazhamudhir Cholaiyile'	Kazhudaiyum Deivamum
20–21 July 2019	Sivaangi	'Oru Naal Podhuma'	Thiruvilaiyadal	Gowtham	'Mazhai Thulli'	Sangamam
20–21 July 2019	Sam Vishal	'Adiye'	Kadal	Roshini	'Gaana Karukuyile'	Sethu
20–21 July 2019	Sahana	'Aalankuyil'	Parthiban Kanavu	Suganthi	'Thaga Thaga Ena'	Karaikkal Ammaiyar
20–21 July 2019	Murugan	'Yaarukaaga Ithu Yaarukaga'	Vasantha Maligai	Punya	'Sowkiyama Kanne'	Sangamam
20–21 July 2019	Parthiban was given rest for that particular week.					

Best Performer & Wall of Fame : Vikram

Best Entertainer : Murugan and Punya

=== The Anirudh Special Round ===
Performances : Music Director Anirudh Ravichander joins the show. The contestants along with musician Stephen Devassy perform songs composed by Anirudh.

Episodes : 27 & 28

Key

Won the Battle
Lost the Battle

Battle

Air Date	Anuradha and Unnikrishnan team	Song	Film	Shweta and Benny team	Song	Film
27–28 July 2019	Sivaangi	'Osaka Osaka' x 'Enna Solla'	Vanakkam Chennai and Thanga Magan	Vaisakhan	'Nee Paartha Vizhigal'	3
27–28 July 2019	Suganthi	'Darling Dambakku'	Maan Karate	Parthiban	'Sodakku'	Thaanaa Serndha Koottam
27–28 July 2019	Murugan	'Kattikida'	Kaaki Sattai	Mufeeda	'Kanave Kanave'	David
27–28 July 2019	Sam Vishal	'Sirikkadhey' x 'Naana Thaana'	Remo and TSK	Gowtham	'Po Nee Po'	3
27–28 July 2019	Kannagi	'Aarariro'		Roshini	'Kadhal Kan'	Kaaki Sattai
27–28 July 2019	Vikram	'Yennai Maatrum Kaadhale'	Naanum Rowdy Dhaan	Punya	'Marana Mass'	Petta

Best Performer & Wall of Fame : Mufeeda

Best Entertainer : Suganthi

Anirudh selects Punya who goes into the Top 10 Round as a direct Top 10 contestant.

=== Masala Padam Round ===
Performances : Contestants battle on songs that are required for a Masala film.

Episodes : 29 & 30

Key

Won the Battle
Lost the Battle

Battle

Air Date	Anuradha and Unnikrishnan team	Song	Film	Shweta and Benny team	Song	Film
3–4 August 2019	Murugan	'Naan Autokaaran'	Baashha	Gowtham	'Aalaporan Tamizhan'	Mersal
3–4 August 2019	Vikram	'Vidukathaiya Intha'	Muthu	Parthiban	'Pathu Masam'	Pandi
3–4 August 2019	Suganthi	'Dindukallu Dindukaluu'	Dindigul Sarathy	Roshini	'Naakku Mukka'	Kadhalil Vizhunthen
3–4 August 2019	Sam Vishal	'Ei Suzhali'	Kodi	Mufeeda	'Snehithane'	Alaipayuthey
3–4 August 2019	Sivaangi	'Marugo Marugo'	Sathi Leelavathi	Punya	'Dum Dum'	Mayabazar
3–4 August 2019	Kannagi	'Oru Ganam Kuda'		Vaisakhan	'Ennai Kaanavillaye'	Kadhal Desam

Best Performer & Wall of Fame : Vikram

Best Entertainer : Gowtham

=== Top 10 Selection with Vijay Stars ===
Performances : The Vijay Stars accompany the contestants and give a dance performance. The contestants face each other in a singing battle to reach the Top 10 spots.

Episodes : 31 & 32

Key

Won the Battle
Lost the Battle

Battle

Air Date	Anuradha and Unnikrishnan team		Song	Film	Shweta and Benny team		Song	Film
Air Date	Vijay Stars	Contestant	Song	Film	Vijay Stars	Contestant	Song	Film
10–11 August 2019	Prajin	Vikram	'Padichu Paarthen'	Polladhavam	Sreethu	Mufeeda	'Rahathulla'	Ghajini
10–11 August 2019	Arun & Roshini	Sivaangi	'Yey Durra'	Aathi	Hussain & Manimegalai	Parthiban	'Kannitheevu Ponna'	Yuddham Sei
10–11 August 2019	Chitra	Suganthi	'Mannarkudi Kalakalakka'	Sivaputhigaran	Azhar	Gowtham	'Dandanakka'	Romeo Juliet
10–11 August 2019	Kumaran	Sam Vishal	'Chikku Bukku Rayile'	Gentleman	Sanjeev & Alya	Vaisakhan	'Maduraiku Pogathadi'	Azhagiya Tamil Magan
10–11 August 2019	Rakshan and Bala	Murugan	'Ooru Vittu Ooru Vandhu'	Karakattakkaran	Mani & Felina	Roshini	'Ada Machamulla'	Chinna Veedu
10–11 August 2019	Punya gave a non-competitive special performance on the song 'Ondra Renda' from the film Kaakha Kaakha. The performance was accompanied by Vijay Stars Dhiraviam and Pavithra							

Best Performer & Wall of Fame : Sivaangi

Best Entertainer : Sam Vishal

=== Top 10 Celebration-Boys vs Girls Round ===
Performances : The participants split into 2 different teams and take up challenges. Super Singer Stars join the Celebration round to support the boys and girls.

Judge :Anuradha Sriram and Shweta Mohan supported the Girls team while Benny Dayal and P. Unnikrishnan supported the Boys team. The winner of the battle was declared by the audience present on the sets.

Episodes : 33 & 34

Key

Won the Battle
Lost the Battle

Battle

Air Date	Boys team	Song(s)	Girls team	Song(s)
17–18 August 2019	Sreekanth, Murugan and Hrithik	'Tazhaya Poomudichu' x 'Raasave Unnai Nambi' x 'Kathaazha Kattu Vazhi'	Mufeeda, Sivaangi, Malavika	'Gala Gala Vena' x 'Poovaasam' x 'Kanmani Anbodu'
17–18 August 2019	Roshan and Robin	'Mazhai Thuli' x 'Andha Arabi Kadaloram'	Sireesha and Soujanya	'Thaachuko'
17–18 August 2019	Gowtham, Arjun and Santhosh Balaji	'Hey Mama' x 'What a Karuvad' x 'Karuthavellam Galeejan' x 'Maari Thara Local'	Rakshita, Purnima and Ahana	'Pottu Vaitha'
17–18 August 2019	Poovaiyar	'Heartukulla'	Roshini	'Heartukulla'
17–18 August 2019	Vikram and Sakthi	'Sambo Shiva Sambo'	Punya and Nithyashree	'Maasi Maasi'
17–18 August 2019	Sam Vishal, Vaisakhan and Sudarshan	'Maanja Potu Thaan' x 'Rum Bum Bum' x 'Viswanathan Velai Vendum'	Aparna, Haripriya and Anushya	'Andru Vanthathum' x 'En Iniya Pon Nilave' x 'Paarkadhey Oru Maadhiri'

Best Performer : Punya and Nithyashree

Best Entertainer : Vaisakhan

=== Fusion Round With Rajesh Vaidhya ===
Performances : The participants of the Fusion round showcase their talents and captivate the audience with their performances along with musician Rajhesh Vaidhya in the presence of popular singer Shankar Mahadevan.

Episodes : 35 & 36

Key

Won the Battle
Lost the Battle

Battle

Air Date	Anuradha and Unnikrishnan team	Song	Film	Shweta and Benny team	Song	Film
24–25 August 2019	Suganthi	'Thulluvatho Ilamai'	Thulluvadho Ilamai	Gowtham	'Sorgam Madhuvile'	Sattam En Kaiyil
24–25 August 2019	Murugan	'Aasai Nooru Vagai'	Adutha Varisu	Vaisakhan	'Anjali Anjali'	Duet
24–25 August 2019	Sam Vishal	'Aathangara Marame'	Kizhakku Cheemayile	Mufeeda	'Margazhi Thingal Allava'	Sangamam
24–25 August 2019	Vikram	'Muthal Muthalil Parthen'	Aaha	Roshini	'Mudhal Murai'	Neethaane En Ponvasantham
24–25 August 2019	Sivaangi	'Hey Unnai Thaane'	Kadhal Parisu	Punya	'Azhagana Ponnu Naan'	Alibabavum 40 Thirudargalum

Best Performer & Wall of Fame : Vikram

Best Entertainer : Sivaangi

=== Romance Round ===
Key

Won the Battle
Lost the Battle

Battle

Air Date	Anuradha and Unnikrishnan team	Song	Film	Shweta and Benny team	Song	Film
31 August – 1 September 2019	Sivaangi	'Othayadi Paathayilla'	Kanaa	Mufeeda	'Chinna Chinna'	Mouna Ragam
31 August – 1 September 2019	Suganthi	'Ey Sandakaara'	Irudhi Suttru	Punya	'Kannamoochi Yaenada'	Kandukondain Kandukondain
31 August – 1 September 2019	Vikram	'Ennavale Adi Ennavale'	Kaadhalan	Vaisakhan	'Omana Penne'	Vinnaithaandi Varuvaayaa
31 August – 1 September 2019	Sam Vishal	'Thallipogathey'	Achcham Yenbadhu Madamaiyada	Gowtham	'Kadhal Rojave'	Roja
31 August – 1 September 2019	Murugan gave a non-competitive special performance on the song 'Ah Mella Nada' from the film Puthiya Paravai					

Best Performer & Wall of Fame : Vikram

Best Entertainer : Sivaangi

=== Cinema Cinema Round ===
Performances : The KPY Champions illuminate the stage with their performances where they spoof movies, while the participants give a grand musical feast.

Episodes : 39 & 40

Key

Won the Battle
Lost the Battle

Battle

Air Date	Anuradha and Unnikrishnan team		Song	Film	Shweta and Benny team		Song	Film
Air Date	KPY Stars	Contestant	Song	Film	KPY Stars	Contestant	Song	Film
7–8 September 2019	Ansar & Hamar along with Priyanka	Murugan	'Kadhalikka Neram Illai'	Kadhalikka Neramillai	Nisha & Bala	Mufeeda	'Senthoora Poove'	16 Vayathinile
7–8 September 2019	TSK along with Sivaangi	Sam Vishal	'Oru Maazhai'	Ghajini	Rakshan & Kureshi	Vaisakhan	'Kadu Thirandi'	Vasool Raja MBBS
7–8 September 2019	Nisha & Bala	Sivaangi	'Minsara Poove'	Padayappa	Anand & Honest Raj	Gowtham	Title Song	Varuthapadatha Valibar Sangam
7–8 September 2019	Tamizharasan & Rajavelu	Vikram	'Raagangal Pathinaaru'	Thillu Mullu	Sarath & Pugazh	Punya	'Kaadhal Yaanai'	Anniyan
7–8 September 2019	Suganthi gave a non-competitive guest performance on the song 'Kannodu Kaanbathellam' from the film Jeans along with KPY Stars Arun & Aravind							

Best Performer & Wall of Fame : Vaisakhan

Best Entertainer : Punya

=== The Final Fight ===
Performances : The teams get ready for their final fight as this the last week, the contestants battle as 2 different teams. There are 2 rounds, where 1 contestant from each team come together to battle on a song.

Key

Won the Battle
Lost the Battle

Episode : 41

Round 1

Air Date	Anuradha and Unnikrishnan team	Shweta and Benny team	Song	Film
14 September 2019	Sam Vishal	Mufeeda	'Valayapatti Thavile'	Azhagiya Thamizh Magan
14 September 2019	Vikram	Vaisakhan	'Ventriduven Unnai'	Agathiyar
14 September 2019	Sivaangi	Punya	'Kannum Kannum'	Vanji Kottai Valipan
14 September 2019	Murugan	Gowtham	'Kathadikudu'	Ninaivirukkum Varai

Episode : 42

Round 2

Air Date	Anuradha and Unnikrishnan team	Shweta and Benny team	Song	Film
15 September 2019	Sivaangi	Vaisakhan	'Poo Maalai'	Thanga Magan
15 September 2019	Murugan	Punya	'Kettukodi Urumi'	Pattikada Pattanama
15 September 2019	Vikram	Mufeeda	'September Maadham'	Alaipayuthey
15 September 2019	Sam Vishal	Gowtham	'VIP Title Song' x 'Petta Paraak'	Velaiilla Pattadhari x Petta

Best Performer & Wall of Fame : Vikram

Best Entertainer : Gowtham

=== The Hero Heroine Round ===
Performances : The young singers come up as real heroes and heroines to present a vibrant feast of music. The contestants battle as individuals and not as a team. Top 3 contestants selected by the judges go into the Top 6 directly. The remaining 4 contestants have a one-on-one battle, in which 2 of them get selected for the Top 6, while the remaining 2 go into the danger zone.

Episode : 41 & 42

Round 1

Air Date	Contestant	Song	Film
21 September 2019 – 22 September 2019	Sam Vishal	'Naan Adicha'	Vettaikaaran
21 September 2019 – 22 September 2019	Vaisakhan	'Unnai Kaanaadhu'	Vishwaroopam
21 September 2019 – 22 September 2019	Vikram	'Vettri Kodi Kaddu'	Padayappa
21 September 2019 – 22 September 2019	Punya	'Hello Mister Ethirkatchi'	Iruvar
21 September 2019 – 22 September 2019	Murugan	'Jin Jinukaan'	Rajapart Rangadurai
21 September 2019 – 22 September 2019	Sivaangi	'Sha la la'	Ghilli
21 September 2019 – 22 September 2019	Gowtham	'Adadada' x 'Aaluma Doluma'	Arrambam x Vedalam

Best Performer & Wall of Fame : Murugan

Best Entertainer : Sam Vishal

Top 3 Contestants

1. Murugan

2. Punya

3. Sam Vishal

Round 2

Key

Won the Battle
Lost the Battle

Air Date	Contestant	Song	Film	Contestant	Song	Film
22 September 2019	Sivaangi	'Maraindhirundhu'	Thillana Mohanambal	Gowtham	'Theeyi Vilundha'	Varalaru
22 September 2019	Vikram	'Senthamizh Then Mozhiyal'	Maalaiyitta Mangai	Vaisakhan	'Thesulaavuthe'	Manaalane Mangaiyin Baakkiyam

== Finals ==
=== Quarter-finals- Sing with the Judges Round ===
There are 2 rounds in which the 6 contestants sing with one of the judges Benny Dayal and Shweta Mohan in each round. Contestants scoring marks 75 and above out of 80 go into the Semi-finals directly.

Round 1

Episode : 45

Air Date	Judge	Contestant	Song	Film	Marks
28 September 2019	Benny Dayal	Sam Vishal	'Pakkam Vanthu' X 'Enakku Oru Girlfriend'	Kaththi X Boys	38
28 September 2019	Shweta Mohan	Punya	'Macho' X 'Kadhal Nayagara'	Mersal X En Swasa Kaatre	38
28 September 2019	Shweta Mohan	Murugan	'Per Vechalum'	Michael Madana Kama Rajan	35
28 September 2019	Benny Dayal	Vikram	'Thaniye Thananthaniye'	Rhythm	35
28 September 2019	Benny Dayal	Gowtham	'Thanga Thamarai Magale'	Minsara Kanavu	34
28 September 2019	Shweta Mohan	Sivaangi	'Isai Arasi'	Thaai Mookaambikai	38

Round 2

Episode : 46

Air Date	Judge	Contestant	Song	Film	Marks
29 September 2019	Shweta Mohan	Sam Vishal	'Sirukki Vaasam'	Kodi	38
29 September 2019	Benny Dayal	Sivaangi	'Vaadi Vaadi'	Alli Thandha Vaanam	31
29 September 2019	Shweta Mohan	Gowtham	'Vennilave Vennilave'	Minsara Kanavu	35
29 September 2019	Shweta Mohan	Vikram	'Elangathu Veesudhe'	Pithamagan	37
29 September 2019	Benny Dayal	Punya	'Mukkala Muqabla'	Kaadhalan	37
29 September 2019	Benny Dayal	Murugan	'Podhuvaga En Manasu'	Murattu Kaalai	39

Contestant	Total Marks
Sam Vishal	76
Punya	75
Murugan	74
Vikram	72
Sivaangi	69
Gowtham	69

=== Top 5 Celebration ===
The participants present a series of folk performances. The episode features the top five contestants of the season in a celebratory format.

Episode : 47

Air Date	Performers	Song	Film
5 October 2019	Vikram and Anuradha Sriram	'Uppu Karuvaadu'	Mudhalvan
5 October 2019	Sam Vishal, Sivaangi, Gowtham	'Karigaalan'	Vettaikaaran
5 October 2019	Ma Ka Pa Anand and Shweta Mohan	'Valaiyosai Kala'	Sathyaa
5 October 2019	Murugan	'Eratha Malai Mela'	Muthal Mariyathai
5 October 2019	Punya and Priyanka Deshpande	'Andangaka Kondakaari'	Anniyan
