= Kadhalum Kadandhu Pogum (soundtrack) =

Soundtrack album by Santhosh Narayanan
- Released: 22 February 2016
- Recorded: 2016
- Genre: Feature film soundtrack
- Length: 15:17
- Language: Tamil
- Label: Sony Music
- Producer: Santhosh Narayanan

Santhosh Narayanan chronology
Irudhi Suttru (2016)	Kadhalum Kadandhu Pogum (2016)	Manithan (2016)

Singles from Kadhalum Kadandhu Pogum
- 1. "Ka Ka Ka Po" Released: 8 February 2016

Kadhalum Kadandhu Pogum is the soundtrack album to the 2016 film of the same name directed by Nalan Kumarasamy and produced by C. V. Kumar's Thirukumaran Entertainment and K. E. Gnanavel Raja's Studio Green, starring Vijay Sethupathi and Madonna Sebastian. The film's soundtrack featured music composed by Santhosh Narayanan with lyrics written by Vivek, Thamarai, Mohan Rajan, Arunraja Kamaraj and Nalan himself. The soundtrack, preceded with "Ka Ka Ka Po" as the lead single, with the soundtrack releasing on 22 February 2016 under Sony Music India label.

== Background ==
The film's musical score is composed by Santhosh Narayanan, in his second collaboration with Nalan Kumarasamy after Soodhu Kavvum (2013). Nalan insisted Santhosh to tone down the quirkiness, a unique aspect in his music, to set the tone stand apart from Soodhu Kavvum. However, Santhosh experimented the film's music with instrumentation and harmonies for specific songs. The soundtrack emphasizes use of folk, classical and orchestral genres.

== Release ==
The song "Ka Ka Ka Po" was released as a single on 8 February 2016 and became an instant hit upon release. The entire album released on 22 February 2016 by Sony Music India which acquired the music rights.

== Track listing ==
No.	Title	Lyrics	Singer(s)	Length
1.	"Ka Ka Ka Po"	Mohan Rajan	Santhosh Narayanan, Ananthu, Meenakshi Iyer	3:43
2.	"Paravai Parandhuchu"	Vivek	Pragathi Guruprasad, Srinisha Jayaseelan ·	2:36
3.	"Pangaali"	Nalan Kumarasamy, Arunraja Kamaraj	Arunraja Kamaraj	2:19
4.	"Akkam Pakkam Paar"	Thamarai	Mano, Santhosh Narayanan	3:17
5.	"Bongu Kichan"	Vivek	Santhosh Narayanan	3:22
Total length:				15:17

== Critical reception ==
Karthik Srinivasan of Milliblog stated the album as "passable soundtrack" and stated the songs "Paravai Parandhuchu" and "Bongu Kichan" are likeable. S. Saraswathi of Rediff.com noted "Santosh's background score is just as intriguing as Nalan’s witty script with characters that touch your heart." Baradwaj Rangan of The Hindu wrote "[Santhosh Narayanan] may be getting too tied down to a sound — lush, quirky, local — but at least it throbs with life." Sify noted "Santhosh Narayanan elevates each and every scene with his soulful score."

Kirubakar Purushothaman of India Today wrote "Except Ka Ka Po, Santhosh Narayanan's songs have perfectly blended with the film that you won't realise that a song has passed by. But the BGM for Sethupathi is bit disappointing, when compared to 'Sudden Delight', which he has composed for Nalan's debut film Soodhu Kavvum." A reviewer from Cinema Express noted "Kadhalum Kadanthu Pogum established Santhosh Narayanan as" someone who could make contrasting musical worlds coexist [...] the musician was on a roll". Ashuthosh Mohan of Film Companion South listed it as one of the best albums which were quirky and appealing. "Ka Ka Ka Po" was listed as one of the best Tamil songs of 2016.

== Accolades ==
Award	Date of ceremony (Note: Date is linked to the article about the awards held that year, wherever possible.)	Category	Recipient(s) and nominee(s)	Result	Ref.
Ananda Vikatan Cinema Awards	13 January 2017	Best Music Director	Santhosh Narayanan (Note: also for Irudhi Suttru, Manithan, Iraivi, Kabali, Kodi and Kaashmora)	Won	
