= Sam Vishal =

Indian vocalist (born 1999)

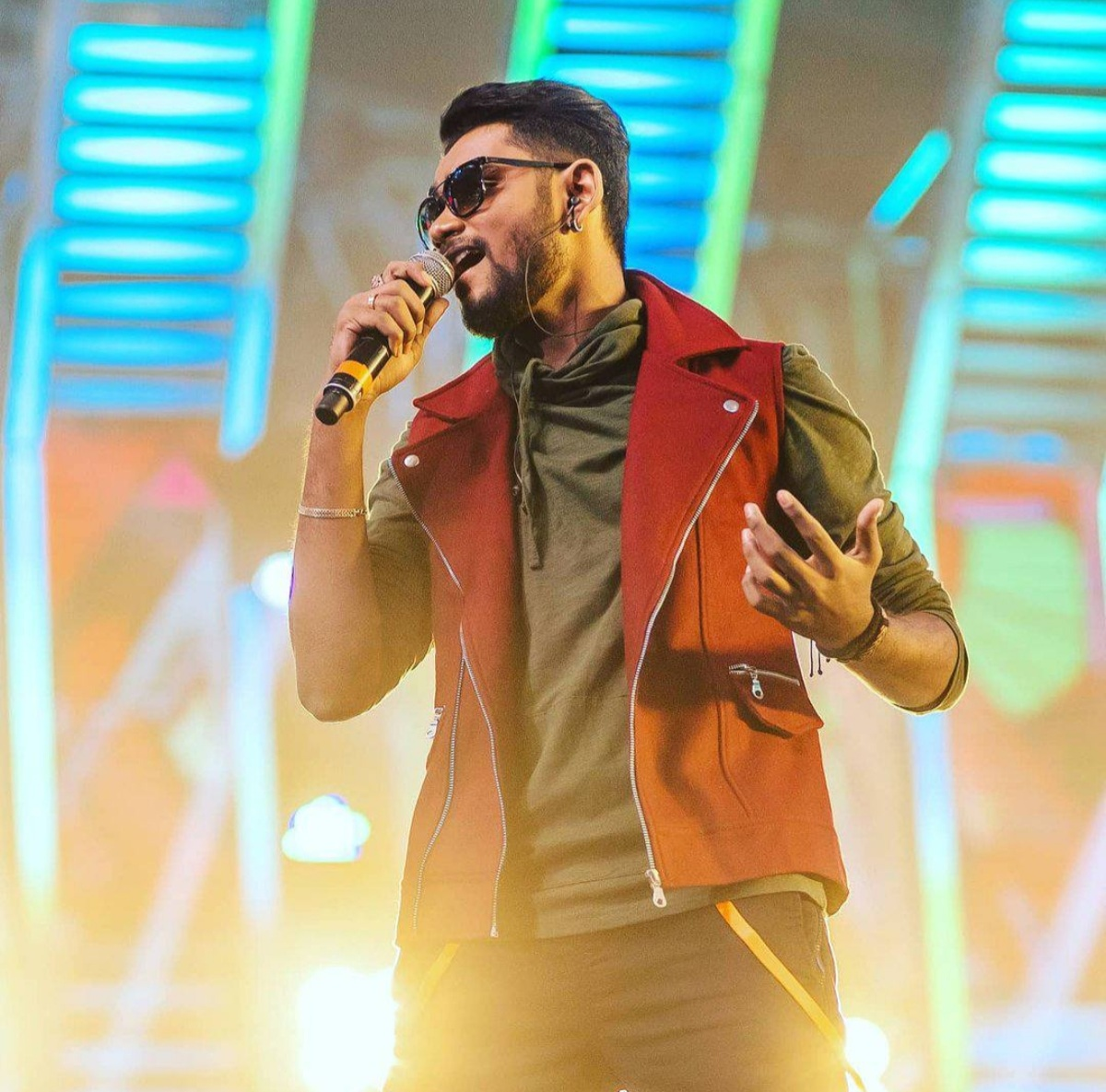
- Vishal in 2019
- Born: Sam Vishal J.X. 28 September 1999 (age 27); Thanjavur, Tamil Nadu, India
- Education: Loyola College, Chennai
- Occupation: Singer
- Years active: 2019 – present
- Television: Super Singer 7
- Height: 5 ft 11 in (180 cm)

Sam Vishal J.X. (born 28 September 1999) is an Indian singer and an independent vocalist. In 2019, he became the 2nd runner up of Super Singer 7 reality show. As the 2nd runner up of his season, he won a chance to sing songs for music director Anirudh Ravichander – 'Chitti Story' and 'Putta Story' (Telugu and Kannada versions of 'Kutti Story') for the film Master. Apart from film music, Sam Vishal is also a regular in independent music and is also seen releasing music independently. He has won the 'Sensational Singer at Digital' award at Blacksheep Digital Awards 2022.

== Early life ==
Sam Vishal was born in Thanjavur, Tamil Nadu to Mr. Xavier Sahayaraj and Mrs. Sofia Xavier. He also has a younger sister, Sifra Xavier. Sam Vishal has not learned music in the course of formal studies and comes from a family without a musical background. He completed his Bachelor's degree in English Literature at Loyola College, Chennai. During his college days, he started a band along with his friends and went on to participate in many competitions.

== Career ==
=== Television ===
In 2019, Sam Vishal made his first TV appearance when he got selected as one of the top 20 contestants in Super Singer 7. During the show, he also revealed that his close friend Deepan had sent his audio and video clips for Super Singer auditions without his knowledge and had informed him about this only after he had got selected. When he was nominated by the judges as the danger zone contestant of the week, he managed to get 65,50,285 votes in a total of 72,35,296 votes against Roshini which marks the highest number of votes that any contestant had got in the history of Super Singer. He was finally tied at the 3rd place along with Punya.

In 2020, he went on to participate Super Singer Champion of Champions featuring the Super Singer Stars along with his team Bachelor Band that included playback singer Srinisha Jayaseelan and DJ Sudhan aka DJ Black. According to sources, Bachelor Band was the first ever team to use a DJ in a musical show in the south. With this unique combo of musicians, they made their way into the finals as a direct finalist along with the Nighty Boys (Srinivasan Raghunathan, Diwakar and Manoj) and the Ooo Team (Maalavika Sundar, Santhosh Hariharan and Rangapriya).

=== As playback singer ===
Sam Vishal made his debut as a playback singer with "Chitti Story" (Telugu version of Kutti Story) which was released in December 2020 in which he sang along with music director Anirudh Ravichander, and then also recorded 'Putta Story', the Kannada version of the same.

In May 2021 he sang "Talku Lessu Worku Moreu" for the movie Murungakkai Chips under the music composition of Dharan Kumar alongside Sivaangi .K.

In 2022 Vishal worked with Hiphop Tamizha on the song "Kanavugal" from Anbarivu and again with A. H. Kaashif for 'Poove' song from Rendagam. Sam then sang the Duet "Ninne Thaladanne" from The Life of Muthu with Rakshita Suresh composed by A. R. Rahman.

== Show host ==
In 2020, Sam Vishal made his debut as a host with the YouTube game show Samodu Vilayadu, launched on the Media Masons YouTube channel. The show features a lively, scratch card-based format combining movie trivia with the participation of TV, digital, and film celebrities. It premiered on May 9, 2020, and has successfully completed three seasons. As of 2025, it is airing its fourth season.

=== Independent Music ===
On 13 February 2021, Media Masons released a single 'Kaarkuzhal Kanmani' starring Sam Vishal and Pragya Nagra which was directed by Ravoofa H.K. The music was composed by Sebastin Rozario while the lyrics were penned by Parthiv Mani and was sung by Sam Vishal himself.

Sam Vishal then provided his vocals for the song "Kannamma Eannamma" composed by Dev Prakash. He was also a part of the music video that starred Rio Raj, Pavithra Lakshmi and Bala.

The second original of Media Masons 'Yarume Thevayillai' was released on 8 October 2021. The music video featured Sam Vishal, Shirley and A. H Kaashif who is the composer and lyricist of the song. The song was sung by Sam Vishal and Amina Rafiq.

The fifth original of Media Masons was titled as 'Theera Kadhalae' and the song was released on 22 April 2022. The music video starred Sam Vishal and Akshaya Hariharan and was directed by Sasikumar Jeyaraman. The music was composed by Santhosh Balaji and the song was sung by Sam Vishal. "Theera Kadhalae" marks the 25th song of Sam Vishal in his career.

== Discography ==
Key
†	Denotes songs that have not yet been released

=== Independent Songs ===
Year	Song	Album	Language	Composer	Co-artists
2019	"Nee Indri Naatkalum"	Short Film - En Dhevadhai En Bike	Tamil	AKKU The Band	
2020	"Minnal Polave"	Short Film - Best Friend	Tamil	Sebastin Rozario	
2020	"Kaaka Mutta Kannala"		Tamil	Rashaanth Arwin	
2020	"Solla Maatten Po"		Tamil	Amritesh Vijayan	Sivaangi Krishnakumar
2021	"Kaarkuzhal Kanmani"	MM Originals	Tamil	Sebastin Rozario	
2021	"Neere Niranthara Urave"		Tamil	Sharran Surya	
2021	"Seeni Sakkara Mittaye"		Tamil	Sharran Surya	
2021	"Ava Cola"		Tamil	Priyadharsan Subbian	
2021	"Vanji Aval Pearazhagi"		Tamil	Gersan	Mahathi
2021	"Siragugal"		Tamil	Ilamaran	Praniti
2021	"Tholai Thooram"	Eyes on Keys	Tamil	M. Kowtham	
2021	"Kannamma Eannamma"		Tamil	Dev Prakash	
2021	"Maravadhey"		Tamil	Samyuktha. V	Samyuktha. V
2021	"Anbe En Anbe"	Susi-Search of Love	Tamil	Kishore Murali	Sowmya Lakshmi
2021	"Yaarume Thevai Illa"	MM Originals	Tamil	A.H. Kaashif	Amina Rafiq
2021	"Walkie Talkie"		Tamil	MJ	Dhanu
2021	"En Swasame"		Tamil	Alfee-Jim	
2022	"Kalyanam Kacheri"		Tamil	Gokul Sreekandan	
2022	"Nam Desamey"		Tamil	BK Kannagi	Anuradha Sriram, Srinisha, Vikram Sai Prasad, Yogi Sekar, BK Kannagi
2022	"Theera Kadhalae"	MM Originals	Tamil	Santosh Balaji	
2022	"Muthu Pechi"		Tamil	Charan Kumar	Madhumitha
2022	"Thikki Thikki"		Tamil	Navin Kumar	CJL
2022	"Netrayinum Indrayinum"		Tamil	Dev Prakash	Anu Anand
2022	"Crazy Hazy"	Insta - 1 Min Music	Tamil	Makka Band	
2022	"Romantic Virumandi"		Tamil	Ehsan Regal	
2022	"Nanba Vaa"	Insta - 1 Min Music	Tamil	Sebastin Rozario	
2022	'Aaruyir Ayyapa'		Tamil	Dharan Kumar	Muthusirpi
2022	"Praaname Ayyappa"		Telugu	Dharan Kumar	Muthusirpi
2022	"Usiru Neene Ayyappa"		Kannada	Dharan Kumar	Muthusirpi
2022	"Kananajyothiyam Ayyappa"		Malayalam	Dharan Kumar	Muthusirpi
2022	"Karther Thaamae Nammai Thedi"		Tamil	Ashley JC	
2023	"Isaiyai Nee"		Tamil	Nilukshan	
2023	"Nila Mugam"	MM Originals	Tamil	Sebastin Rozario	
2023	"Kanavula Vazhuranae"		Tamil	Mohan Ram	Hemambiga
2023	"Oru Vaarthai"	Saregama	Tamil	CM Naveen	
2024	"Kadhal Serkaadho"	MM Originals	Tamil	Sam Vishal	Niyathi Kadambi
2024	"Nambunga"			Reenukumar	Mervin Solomon and Reenukumar
2025	"Yengureney"		Tamil	Sam Vishal	Srinisha Jayaseelan
2025	"Yesappa Kitta"		Tamil	Sam Vishal	
2026	"Kaalam Neram"	MM Originals	Tamil	Sam Vishal	
2026	"Hey Raasathi"	Saregama	Tamil	Samson P Moses	

=== Film Songs ===
Year	Song	Film	Language	Composer	Co-artists
2020	"Rangoola Lokam"	Hi Five	Telugu	JD Jawz	
2020	"Chitti Story"	Master	Telugu	Anirudh Ravichander	Anirudh Ravichander
2020	"Putta Story"	Master	Kannada	Anirudh Ravichander	
2021	"Talku Lessu Worku Moreu"	Murungakkai Chips	Tamil	Dharan Kumar	Sivaangi Krishnakumar
2022	"Kanavugal"	Anbarivu	Tamil	Hiphop Tamizha	Benny Dayal, Srinisha Jayaseelan, Bamba Bakya Sridhar Sena, Shilvi & Maanasi. K
2022	"Poove"	Rendagam	Tamil	A.H. Kaashif	
2022	"Ninne Thaladanne"	The Life of Muthu	Telugu	A. R. Rahman	Rakshita Suresh
2022	"Vaa Arugil Vaa"	Dum Dum Dumeel	Tamil	Santhosh Dhayanidhi	Amina Rafiq

== Awards and nominations ==
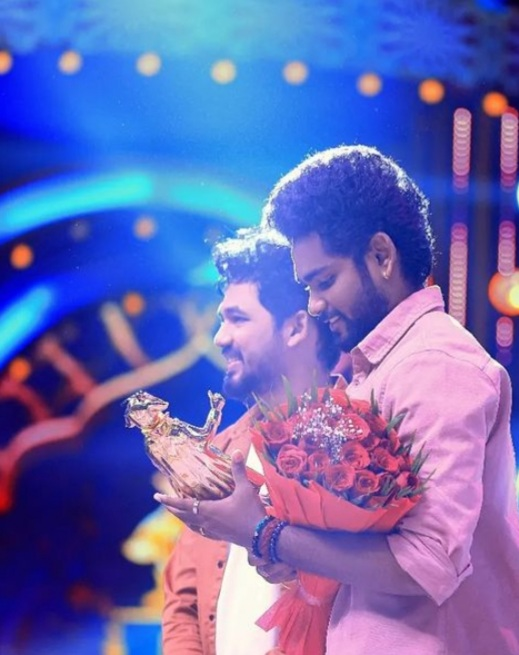
Sam at Blacksheep Digital Awards 2022

Year	Award	Category	Result
2022	Blacksheep Digital Awards	Sensational Singer at Digital	Won
2025	Cineulagam Digital Awards	The Best Digital Anchor	Won
