= Iraivi (soundtrack) =

2016 soundtrack album by Santhosh Narayanan

- Soundtrack album cover

Soundtrack album by Santhosh Narayanan
- Released: 15 April 2016
- Recorded: 2016
- Genre: Feature film soundtrack
- Length: 21:39
- Language: Tamil
- Label: Sony Music
- Producer: Santhosh Narayanan

Santhosh Narayanan chronology
Manithan (2016)	Iraivi (2016)	Kabali (2016)

Iraivi is the soundtrack album to the 2016 film of the same name directed by Karthik Subbaraj and produced by C. V. Kumar, K. E. Gnanavel Raja and Abhinesh Elangovan under Thirukumaran Entertainment, Studio Green and Abi & Abi Pictures, respectively. The film stars S. J. Suryah, Vijay Sethupathi, Bobby Simha, Kamalinee Mukherjee, Anjali, and Pooja Devariya.

The film's musical score and soundtrack were composed by Santhosh Narayanan and featured six songs written by Vivek, Muthamil and Mani Amudhavan. The album was released under the Sony Music India label on 15 April 2016 to positive reviews from critics.

== Development ==
The film's soundtrack and score were composed by Santhosh Narayanan in his second consecutive collaboration with Karthik Subbaraj after Pizza (2012) and Jigarthanda (2014). The song "Onnu Rendu" was recorded first with S. J. Suryah in his second stint as a singer. Santhosh had worked with various musicians from Chennai and Sydney for the film's music. On the occasion of Women's Day (8 March 2016), Santhosh recorded a song dedicated to women titled "Manidhi", with his mother Mahalakshmi Rajagopalan singing for the song. While four songs were added during the production, Santhosh had composed two more songs, including "Manidhi" were composed after watching the final edit. Santhosh further added the additional songs would be released after the film.

== Release ==
The film's soundtrack was distributed by Sony Music India and released on 15 April 2016 at a launch event held at Sathyam Cinemas in Chennai, with the film's cast and crew in attendance.

== Track listing ==
No.	Title	Lyrics	Singer(s)	Length
1.	"Onnu Rendu"	Vivek	S. J. Suryah	03:12
2.	"Kadhal Kappal"	Muthamil	Santhosh Narayanan	04:04
3.	"Solla Thudikkudhu Manasu"	Vivek	R. K. Sundar	03:23
4.	"Dhushta"	Vivek	Meenakshi, Dhee	03:46
5.	"Othaiyila"	Mani Amudhavan	Anthony Daasan	02:19
6.	"Manidhi"	Vivek	Brinda, Ananthu, Santhosh Narayanan, Mahalakshmi Rajagopalan	04:55
Total length:				21:39

== Reception ==
Siddharth K of Sify gave 3.5 out of 5 to the album and stated "Santhosh Narayanan is back in style". Karthik Srinivasan of Milliblog wrote "Less album-friendly (perhaps more situational) soundtrack from Santhosh." S. Saraswathi of Rediff.com wrote "Santhosh Narayanan has outdone himself with the stunning background score and great songs." Kirubakar Purushothaman of India Today wrote "If Batman is what Gotham needs him to be, then Santhosh Narayanan is what Karthik wants him to be. It's hard to fathom the dedication of a music director who can churn out chartbusters, but composes a song like 'Solla Thudikuthu Manasu', just because the script needs it. From the BGM to the song Dushta, Santhosh has delivered what the film has demanded; nothing less, nothing more." Anupama Subramanian of Deccan Chronicle wrote "Santhosh Narayanan songs are passable, while the BGM is good."

== Background score ==
Iraivi

Film score by Santhosh Narayanan
- Released: 3 June 2021
- Recorded: 2016
- Genre: Film score
- Length: 21:39
- Language: Tamil
- Label: Sony Music
- Producer: Santhosh Narayanan

On 3 June 2021, five years after the film's release, the original score album featuring 15 tracks were released by Sony Music India. The album also featured an original song "Kaatril" which had vocals by Santhosh Narayanan and written by Vivek.

No.	Title	Length
1.	"Sacrifice"	01:45
2.	"Revenge"	02:23
3.	"Arul Funny"	00:37
4.	"Conservations with Dad"	02:25
5.	"Friendship"	00:56
6.	"Hero"	00:50
7.	"Humiliation"	00:49
8.	"Iraivi"	03:18
9.	"Kaatril"	01:40
10.	"Marriage"	01:26
11.	"Michael"	04:23
12.	"Ponni"	01:21
13.	"Robbery"	00:53
14.	"The Lovers"	01:54
15.	"Theives"	01:09
Total length:		25:53

== Accolades ==
Award	Date of ceremony (Note: Date is linked to the article about the awards held that year, wherever possible.)	Category	Recipient(s) and nominee(s)	Result	Ref.
Ananda Vikatan Cinema Awards	13 January 2017	Best Music Director	Santhosh Narayanan (Note: also for Irudhi Suttru, Manithan, Iraivi, Kabali, Kodi and Kaashmora)	Won	
