= 36 Vayadhinile (soundtrack) =

Soundtrack album by Santhosh Narayanan
- Released: 6 April 2015
- Recorded: 2015
- Genre: Feature film soundtrack
- Length: 33:32
- Language: Tamil
- Label: Think Music
- Producer: Santhosh Narayanan

Santhosh Narayanan chronology
Enakkul Oruvan (2014)	36 Vayadhinile (2015)	Irudhi Suttru (2016)

36 Vayadhinile is the soundtrack album to the 2015 film of the same name directed by Rosshan Andrrews; a remake of the Malayalam film How Old Are You (2014), the film stars Jyothika, Rahman, Abhirami, Nassar, Delhi Ganesh and Siddhartha Basu. The film's musical score is composed by Santhosh Narayanan, whose soundtrack featured 11 songs, accompanying karaoke versions and instrumental themes; three songs were written by Vivek. The album was released on 6 April 2015 under the Think Music label. The music received positive reviews from critics and received a nomination for Filmfare Award for Best Lyricist – Tamil and two Tamil Nadu State Film Awards.

== Background ==
In November 2014, it was announced that Santhosh Narayanan would compose the musical score and soundtrack to 36 Vayadhinile. When Suriya, the film's producer, asked Andrrews to suggest a composer, the latter mentioned Santhosh's name to which Suriya promptly agreed.

It was reported that unlike the original film which had two songs, the remake would consist of more songs in the film. But the film also featured two songs like the original, with a promotional song "Happy" being used in the background score. The accompanying soundtrack, however, consisted of five instrumental themes used in the background score and karaoke versions of the three songs.

Lalitha Vijayakumar, Carnatic singer and mother of musician Pradeep Kumar, made her debut in playback singing through "Rasathi". Lalitha stated that Santhosh was her family friend in Tiruchirappalli, and the latter knew her musical background. While recording the film's music at Sydney, Santhosh contacted Lalitha's husband to inquire whether she was interested to sing a song, to which Lalitha agreed. He provided her the demo to sing and she recorded the song at a studio in Chennai, while Santhosh monitored the recording in Sydney. She finished recording the song within a couple of hours. Describing the recording experience, Lalitha stated that Santhosh wanted her to record casually and liked the tune as well.

== Release ==
The film's soundtrack was distributed by Think Music and was released at a launch event held at The Leela Palace Hotel in Chennai on 6 April 2015, though a single track "Rasathi" had been released much before. With the cast and crew in attendance, the event further saw the attendance of actors Suriya, Karthi and Sivakumar, directors Bala, Vasanth, Radha Mohan, Pandiraj, Venkat Prabhu, Dharani and K. S. Ravikumar and was hosted by Dhivyadharshini. The film's trailer and two songs, "Rasathi" and "Happy – Naalu Kazhudha" were performed live by Santhosh at the event.

== Reception ==
The album received positive reviews. Siddharth K. of Sify gave the album 4 out of 5 stars and wrote, "Santhosh Narayanan delivers another terrific album adding to the list of his impressive filmography. Although he gets carried away and tries to be too funky with the choice of his singers in his recent albums, his tunes are fresh. 36 Vayadhinile has a good collection of some catchy songs & soothing background score which is a great attribute to the movie." Karthik Srinivasan of Milliblog wrote "Santhosh's short soundtrack is Happy Rasathi." Anupama Subramanian of Deccan Chronicle wrote "The film's biggest plus is Santhosh Narayanan's songs and background score, which go well with the flow of the film." S. Saraswathi of Rediff.com called the music "enjoyable" and "deserves special mention". M Suganth of The Times of India described the score being "more evocative".

== Track listing ==
No.	Title	Lyrics	Singer(s)	Length
1.	"Happy – Naalu Kazhudha"	Vivek	Santhosh Narayanan	3:14
2.	"Pogiren"	Vivek	Kalpana Raghavendar	3:46
3.	"Rasathi"	Vivek	Lalitha Vijayakumar	4:25
4.	"President" (Theme)	—	Instrumental	2:45
5.	"Kannadi" (Theme)	—	Instrumental	2:35
6.	"Vidiyal Thedi" (Theme)	—	Instrumental	1:48
7.	"Kanavugal Sumandhu" (Theme)	—	Instrumental	1:23
8.	"Kanneer Mozhi" (Theme)	—	Instrumental	2:05
9.	"Happy - Naalu Kazhudha" (Karaoke)	—	Instrumental	3:16
10.	"Pogiren" (Karaoke)	—	Instrumental	3:47
11.	"Rasathi" (Karaoke)	—	Instrumental	4:28
Total length:				33:32

== Awards and nominations ==
Award (Note: Awards, festivals and organisations are in alphabetical order.)	Date of ceremony (Note: Date is linked to the article about the awards held that year, wherever possible.)	Category	Recipient(s) and nominee(s)	Result	Ref.
Filmfare Awards South	18 June 2016	Best Lyricist – Tamil	Vivek – ("Rasathi")	Nominated	
IIFA Utsavam	24–25 January 2016	Best Lyricist – Tamil	Vivek – ("Rasathi")	Nominated	
IIFA Utsavam	24–25 January 2016	Best Male Playback Singer – Tamil	Lalitha Vijayakumar – ("Rasathi")	Nominated	
Mirchi Music Awards South	8 April 2015	Album of the Year – Tamil	36 Vayadhinile	Nominated	
Mirchi Music Awards South	8 April 2015	Song of the Year – Tamil	"Rasathi"	Nominated	
Mirchi Music Awards South	8 April 2015	Music Composer of the Year – Tamil	Santhosh Narayanan – ("Pogiren")	Nominated	
Mirchi Music Awards South	8 April 2015	Lyricist of the Year – Tamil	Vivek – ("Pogiren")	Nominated	
Mirchi Music Awards South	8 April 2015	Female Vocalist of the Year – Tamil	Lalitha Vijayakumar – ("Rasathi")	Nominated	
Mirchi Music Awards South	8 April 2015	Female Vocalist of the Year – Tamil	Kalpana Raghavendar – ("Pogiren")	Nominated	
Mirchi Music Awards South	8 April 2015	Upcoming Lyricist of the Year – Tamil	Vivek – ("Pogiren")	Won	
Mirchi Music Awards South	8 April 2015	Upcoming Female Vocalist of the Year – Tamil	Lalitha Vijayakumar – ("Rasathi")	Nominated	
Norway Tamil Film Festival Awards	28 April–1 May 2016	Best Female Playback Singer	Lalitha Vijayakumar – ("Rasathi")	Won	
Tamil Nadu State Film Awards	6 March 2024	Best Lyricist	Vivek – ("Rasathi")	Won	
Tamil Nadu State Film Awards	6 March 2024	Best Female Playback Singer	Kalpana Raghavendar – ("Pogiren")	Won	
