= Senthildass Velayutham =

- Born: Senthildass; 21 May 1977 (age 48); Neduvasal, Pudukkottai district, Tamil Nadu, India
- Occupations: Playback singer, lyricist
- Instrument: Voice
- Years active: 1990 – 2022

Senthildass Velayutham (earlier called Senthildass), a Tamil playback and side chorus singer, who works predominantly in the Tamil film industry.

== Early life ==
Senthildass Velayutham was born in Neduvasal village in Pudukkottai district, Tamil Nadu. He was a self-taught musician during his school days in Neduvasal. While studying in college in Pudukkottai, he used to sing in light music band. He later moved to Chennai for searching job, and got a chance to sing in light music orchestra. During the musical program, the other musicians encouraged him to learn music properly for a better performance. He then joined Tamil Music College, Chennai. He completed a three-year diploma in music, and also got a master's degree in music from the same college. .

== Career ==
With an ambition to become a playback singer, Senthildass Velayutham recorded his vocals and played to different music directors. It was music composer Srikanth Deva who gave him the first chance to sing the song "Usilampatti Sandhaiyila" in a 2008 Tamil movie Thenavattu, which was a popular folk song. Since then he has sung the songs composed by all leading music directors in the film industry including Ilaiyaraaja, Deva, Harris Jayaraj, D. Imman, Yuvan Shankar Raja, Sundar C Babu, Karthik Raja, Dhina, Mani Sharma, Santhosh Narayanan, Sam C. S., Vijay Antony, Isaac Thomas Kottukapally and Sabesh–Murali. His song "Andipatti Kanava Kathu" in the 2016 Tamil hit movie Dharmadurai, sung with Surmukhi Raman, made him a popular singer.

Senthildass Velayutham wrote the song "Enna Vittu Pona" for the film Raame Aandalum Raavane Aandalum with Krish composing the music.

== Discography ==
The discography of Senthildass Velayutham includes:Side chorus and group songs.

Year	Film	Language	Songs	Music director	Main singer's & Co-singers
2006	Aacharya	Tamil	Kannai Katti	Srikanth Deva	
2006	Aacharya	Tamil	Uyirin Uirey	Srikanth Deva	
2006	Nenjirukkum Varai	Tamil	Yedho Onnu	Srikanth Deva	Priyadharshini
2006	Kumaran	Tamil	Go Go Azhago	Harris Jayaraj	
2007	Madurai Veeran	Tamil	Uyirum Uyirum	Srikanth Deva	Surmukhi Raman
2007	Madurai Veeran	Tamil	Nyokka Makka	Srikanth Deva	Priyadharshini, Srikanth Deva
2007	Puli Varudhu	Tamil	Kadhalikka Solludi	Srikanth Deva	Manikka Vinayagam, Swarnalatha, Karunas
2007	Naalaiya Pozhuthum Unnodu	Tamil	Poovenbatha	Srikanth Deva	Srimathumitha
2007	Aalwar	Tamil	Pallaandu	Srikanth Deva	P. Unnikrishnan
2007	Aalwar	Tamil	Mayile Mayile	Srikanth Deva	Srikanth Deva, Roshini, Suruthipriya, Arjun Thamas, Sujavitha
2008	Thangam	Tamil	Chinna Chinna mukkuthi	Srikanth Deva	Surmukhi Raman
2008	Sila Nerangalil	Tamil	Embavai Embavai	Srikanth Deva	Reshmi
2008	Thotta	Tamil	Saami Aaduda	Srikanth Deva	Surmukhi Raman, Asith
2008	Kodaikanal	Tamil	Chinna China Kathai	Deva	Krishnaraj, S. Sathya
2008	Pandi	Tamil	Aadi Adangum Ulagathila	Srikanth Deva	Grace Karunas
2008	Pandi	Tamil	Oorai Suthum	Srikanth Deva	
2008	Thenavattu	Tamil	Usilampatti Sandhaiyila	Srikanth Deva	Shankar Mahadevan, Mahalakshmi Iyer
2008	Arjunan Kadhali	Tamil	Maana Madhura	Srikanth Deva	Sangeetha
2008	Thiruvannamalai	Tamil	Kaadai	Srikanth Deva	Magi, Renuka
2008	Aayudham Seivom	Tamil	Kandom Kandom	Srikanth Deva	Murugesh
2009	Naadodigal	Tamil	Yakka Yakka	Sundar C. Babu	Chandran, Srilekha
2009	Vedigundu Murugesan	Tamil	Manjapattu	Dhina	Malathy
2009	Vaidehi	Tamil	Kadhal Poo	Srikanth Deva	Ajubai
2009	Vanam Partha Seemayile	Tamil	Yai Yai Raaakkamma	Srikanth Deva	Jaya Sreekumar, Renuka
2009	Enga Raasi Nalla Raasi	Tamil	Entha Varusam	Deva	Renuka
2010	Virudhagiri	Tamil	Mannavane Mandhirane	Sundar C Babu	
2010	Goripalayam	Tamil	Aapakari Aapakari	Sabesh–Murali	Murali, Shyam, Mimicry Senthil
2011	Avargalum Ivargalum	Tamil	Para Para	Srikanth Deva	Karthik, Surmukhi Raman, Renuka
2011	Kandaen	Tamil	Yavarakum Thalaivan	Vijay Ebenezer	Chinmayi
2011	Azhagarsamiyin Kuthirai	Tamil	Adiye Ivale	Ilaiyaraaja	Thanjai Selvi, Snehan, Lenin Bharathi, Hemambika, Murugan, Iyyappan, Master Regan, Anita
2011	Madhikettan Saalai	Tamil	Naadu Summa Kidanthalum	Srikanth Deva	Karthik, Velmurugan
2011	Vellore Maavattam	Tamil	Adikuthu Adikuthu	Sundar C Babu	Manikka Vinayagam, Navven Madhav, Maanasa, Malgudi Subha
2011	Markandeyan	Tamil	Paasam Indri	Sundar C Babu	
2011	Vedi	Tamil	Bombay Ponnu	Vijay Antony	Mamta Sharma, M. L. R. Karthikeyan
2011	Varnam	Tamil	Dangaa Dungaa	Isaac Thomas Kottukapally	
2011	Mudhal Idam	Tamil	Mudhal Idam	D. Imman	Feji, Ranaina Reddy, Sam P. Keerthan, Vasudevan
2011	Thambikottai	Tamil	Vaa Pulla	D. Imman	Velmurugan, Mukesh, M. L. R. Karthikeyan
2012	Muthal Thagaval Arikkai	Tamil	Un Athanum Naanthane	Ravi Raagav	Surmukhi Raman
2012	Vachathi	Tamil	Uyirahasi	Jack Srivathsan	
2012	Pudhumugangal Thevai	Tamil	Adicha Ghilli	Twinz Tunes	Mukesh Mohamed, Priya Himesh
2013	Biriyani	Telugu	Adugule Na Ningi	Yuvan Shankar Raja	Sathyan, Saketh Naidu, Rakendu Mouli
2013	All in All Azhagu Raja	Tamil	All in All	S. Thaman	Suchith Suresan, Sam P.Keerthan, Belly Raj
2013	Arya Surya	Tamil	mama	Srikanth Deva	Gangai Amaran, Belliraj, Mahathi, Hemambika, Surmukhi Raman
2014	Thirudan Police	Tamil	Ennodu Vaa	Yuvan Shankar Raja	Sathyan, Priyadharshini
2014	Kadhal Solla Aasai	Tamil	Ramaiya Osthavaiya	M. M. Srilekha	Velmurugan, MK Balaji, Krishnamurthy
2015	Sagaptham	Tamil	Vaada Vaada	Karthik Raja	Ramya NSK
2015	Surya vs Surya	Telugu	Sayantham Aaruki	Satya Mahaveer	
2015	Vasuvum Saravananum Onna Padichavanga	Tamil	Lucka Maattikkichi	D. Imman	Dholak Gana Jagan, Palaniammal
2015	Rudhramadevi	Telugu	Rajathi Raja Sri Ganapathi	Ilaiyaraaja	S. P. Balasubrahmanyam
2015	Jippaa Jimikki	Tamil	Vennilaa Poloru	Ranib	V V Prasanna, Surmukhi Raman
2016	Chennai 600028 II	Tamil	House Party	Yuvan Shankar Raja	
2016	Dharma Durai	Tamil	Andipatti	Yuvan Shankar Raja	Surmukhi Raman
2016	Narathan	Tamil	My Name Is Chandhrika	Mani Sharma	Suchitra, Narendhran
2016	Aagam	Tamil	Muttalae	Vishal Chandrashekhar	Anthony Daasan
2016	Atti	Tamil	Ayodhi Kuppam	Sundar C Babu	
2016	Atti	Tamil	Yedhedho Pidikkuthe	Sundar C Babu	
2016	Atti	Tamil	Gilli Bambaram	Sundar C Babu	Gana Vinoth
2016	Vaarayo Vennilave	Tamil	Uyir Ennum	Karthik Raja	Rita, Madhushree
2016	Kabali	Telugu	Okade Okkokokade	Santhosh Narayanan	Ananthu, Vasudevan, Roshan Jamrock
2017	Taramani	Tamil	Paavangalai	Yuvan Shankar Raja	Mukesh Mohamed, Yuvan Shankar Raja
2018	Idam Porul Yaeval	Tamil	Eerakkaathae	Yuvan Shankar Raja	Anitha
2018	Jeyikkira Kuthira	Tamil	Kaadhal embadhu	K. R. Kawin Siva	Priya Subramani
2018	Sandakozhi 2	Telugu	Sichubuddi Pillagada	Yuvan Shankar Raja	Srivardhini
2018	Thodraa	Tamil	Iru Paravai	R.N. Uthamaraja and Navin Shander	
2018	Genius	Tamil	Velaiyadu Magane	Yuvan Shankar Raja	Surmukhi Raman, Sam, Pawan,Priya Himesh, Sri Varthini
2018	Poya Velaya Pathukittu	Tamil	Aayiram Jenmam	Sri Sai Sasi	Surmukhi Raman
2019	Nerkonda Paarvai	Tamil	Thee Mugam Dhaan	Yuvan Shankar Raja	Sathyan, Sarath Santhosh
2019	Kaappaan	Telugu	Seruku	Harris Jayaraj	Senthil Ganesh, Ramani Ammal
2019	Ayogya	Tamil	Yaaro Yaaro	Sam C. S.	Sowmya Ramani
2021	Raame Aandalum Raavane Aandalum	Tamil	Kodangi	Krish	
2021	Raame Aandalum Raavane Aandalum	Tamil	Enna Vittu Pona	Krish	
