= Must Date the Playboy (TV series) =

- Genre: Coming-of-age; Romance
- Written by: T. Suriavelan; Hari Rajan
- Story by: Imma Delos Santos
- Directed by: T. Suriavelan
- Starring: Chandini Nagadurga; Muzammil Elias
- Theme music composer: Shabir Sulthan
- Country of origin: Singapore
- Original language: Tamil
- No. of seasons: 1
- No. of episodes: 28

Production
- Executive producer: T. Suriavelan
- Producers: Satesh Kumaran; Priya
- Editors: Arunkumar; Ram Babu; Hari Rajan
- Running time: approx. 22–24 minutes per episode
- Production company: 360 Entertainment Productions

Original release
- Network: Mediacorp Vasantham
- Release: 22 April 2026 – present

Related
- Must Date the Playboy

Must Date the Playboy is a 2026 Singaporean Tamil-language coming-of-age romantic drama television series directed by T. Suriavelan, starring Chandini Nagadurga and Muzammil Elias in the lead, with Ganga Kannan, Mazhaimegan and Pragadesh s/o Prakash in other pivotal roles. Based on the Philippines novel of the same name written by Imma Delos Santos, the story follows Tara, who enters a fake relationship with the college's notorious heartbreaker, Zayn, in a desperate bid to protect her best friend, from his pursuit. However, her strategic plan backfires as real feelings begin to blur the lines of their game, forcing both Tara and Zayn into a vulnerable emotional battlefield where they risk genuinely falling for each other.

The show was produced by Satesh Kumaran and Priya Ramesh under the 360 Entertainment Productions banner. It premiered on Mediacorp Vasantham on 22 April 2026, and airs from Monday to Thursday at 22:00 and streams digitally on mewatch.

== Plot ==
The story begins in the sprawling, bustling campus of a prestigious college, where Vaishnavi Tara Priyadharshan "Tara" is known as the ultimate nerd—brilliant, focused, and intensely private. Despite coming from an incredibly wealthy background, she completely shuns the flashy, high-profile lifestyle her family's money could afford, choosing instead to bury herself in her studies, oversized sweaters, and thick textbooks. Tara’s safe haven in this chaotic university environment is her tight-knit friendship with Kaushika and Nithin. The three of them are inseparable, sharing a bond built on mutual support, quiet study sessions, and a shared desire to navigate their degrees without unnecessary drama. Tara relies heavily on Kaushika’s protective nature and Nithin’s grounded, steady presence to keep her anchored, unaware that the ghosts of her friends' pasts are about to collide violently with her peaceful academic life.

The friends of Tara have had an old relationship with one major social network in the college. At school, Kaushika, Nithin, Zayn, and Jegan all studied together. Personal conflicts arose among them as time passed; Zayn and Jegan lived a life that was careless in nature, and Kaushika and Nithin stopped their relations with them. At the time of college, Kaushika and Nithin avoided Zayn and Jegan for the sake of their friend Tara.

The fragile peace shatters when Zayn, always looking for a new conquest to cure his boredom, sets his sights on Kaushika. Driven by a mix of nostalgia and his relentless playboy instinct, Zayn begins aggressively pursuing her, completely ignoring the clear boundaries she and Nithin have set. Witnessing her best friend's growing distress and knowing Zayn's destructive track record, Tara's fierce loyalty overrides her naturally timid, nerdy persona. She realizes that standard warnings won't stop a predator like Zayn, so she devises a daring, high-stakes plan: she will throw herself into his orbit to shield Kaushika. Stepping out from the shadows of the library, the wealthy but unassuming nerd deliberately crosses paths with the campus kingpin, boldly proposing a game of her own to catch his attention. Tara's ultimate goal is to make Zayn fall for her instead, intentionally entering a dangerous web of fake dating and psychological chess to distract him, tame his ego, and permanently protect the friends who mean the world to her.

Tara and Zayn is a dangerous game of love where the biggest mistake they can make is falling for each other.

== Cast ==
=== Main ===
- Muzammil Elias as Zayn Ishaan Aravindhan
- Chandni Nagadurga as Vaishnave Tara Priyadharshan
- Mazhaimegan as Nathanael Nithin Nedumaaran
- Pragadesh Prakash as Jagadesh Prakash
- Ganga Kannan as Kaushika Subramaniam

=== Recurring ===
- Puravalan Narayanasamy as Bobby
- Saravannan Gautham as River
- Jaenani Netra as Kaushi's mom
- Dishaaleny Jack as Samantha
- Meera Subramaniam as Tara's mom
- R Chandra Rama as Zayn's dad

== Production ==
=== Development ===
On 7 March 2026, it confirmed through a video release that it would distribute a new Tamil series, to be produced by 360 Entertainment Productions, known for its television soap operas such as Naam.

The story-line is inspired by the Philippines novel of the same name written by Imma Delos Santos. The show's Tamil version was written by T. Suriavelan, Hari Rajan and produced by Satesh Kumaran and Priya Ramesh under 360 Entertainment Productions. Directed by T. Suriavelan.

== Original soundtrack ==
Released on 9 May 2026
No.	Title	Lyrics	Music	Artist	Length
1.	"Imaye"	Shabir Sulthan	Shabir Sulthan	Shabir Sulthan, Srinisha Jayaseelan, Roshan Jamrock	3:25
2.	"Thalli Pogura"	T Suriavelan	T Suriavelan	T Suriavelan, Deepthi Suresh	4:14
3.	"Kollure"	Shabir Sulthan	Shabir Sulthan	Shabir Sulthan, Chaya K, Mazhaimegan.	1:55
4.	"Oru Murai"	T Suriavelan	T Suriavelan	T Suriavelan, Sireesha Bhagavatula	4:40
