= Thenavattu =

- Theatrical release poster
- Directed by: V. V. Kathir
- Written by: V. V. Kathir
- Produced by: Anthony
- Starring: Jiiva; Poonam Bajwa
- Cinematography: Vetri
- Edited by: Raja Mohammad
- Music by: Srikanth Deva
- Production company: ELK Productions
- Distributed by: Sun Pictures
- Release date: 21 November 2008
- Running time: 140 minutes
- Country: India
- Language: Tamil

Thenavattu (transl. Courage) is a 2008 Indian Tamil-language action drama film written and directed by V. V. Kathir, starring Jiiva and Poonam Bajwa in the lead roles, with Ganja Karuppu, Ravi Kale, Shafi, Saikumar, and Rajan P. Dev in supporting roles. The music of the film was composed by Srikanth Deva. Thenavattu was released on 21 November 2008.

== Plot ==
Kailasam, a somber bigwig, performs the last rites of someone dear to him, while Kottai appears swinging a scythe. In a flashback from a few months ago in Ramnad, Kottai's mother cuts down logs while boasting about her son; a god that deserves to see the world. Kottai then journeys to Chennai with Vellaiayan, a dimwit friend. The two end up at a massive house of Kailasam, a local terror.

Kottai and Vellaiayan think that Kailasam only uses their blacksmithing skills for instruments to chop trees, but Kottai discovers that he was hired by Kailasam to make sickles to kill people. Kottai then feeds crying children milk and helping men with epileptic seizures. Later, he falls in love with kind-hearted music teacher Gayathri.

Santhosh, Kailasam's son who regularly rapes women, is helplessly watched by a cop called Suryaprakash. Kottai continues making arrivals until he sees Santhosh touching Gayathri inappropriately. Kottai then beats Santhosh to death, unbeknownst to him that he is Kailasam's son, when he learns about this, he attempts to get revenge on Kottai, but he and the minister is killed by him along with Suryaprakash. Kottai later returns to his home.

== Cast ==
- Jiiva as Kottai
- Poonam Bajwa as Gayathri (voice dubbed by Renuka Kathir)
- Ganja Karuppu as Vellaiayan
- P. Sai Kumar as Suryaprakash (voice dubbed by P. Ravi Shankar)
- Shafi as Santhosh
- Ravi Kale as Kailasam
- Rajan P. Dev as Minister
- Saranya as Kottai's mother
- Delhi Ganesh as Gayatri's father
- Manobala as a man who works under Kailasam
- Kovai Babu as a baby's father
- Vishalini as a baby's mother
- Bava Lakshmanan as Bonda Mani's lover
- Siva Narayana Murthy as priest
- A. Revathi as Transgender Chief
- Suja Varunee in a special appearance
- Vimal as Santhosh's henchman (uncredited)

== Production ==
The film was shot in places including Panruti, Chennai, Kumbakonam, Araku Valley and Rajahmundry. The song "Usilampatti Sandhaiyile" was shot at Madurai and Theni. During the first day of filming, a painting factory near the filming location caught fire, leading to filming being briefly halted.

== Soundtrack ==
The soundtrack was composed by Srikanth Deva in his second collaboration with Jiiva after E (2006), with lyrics by Na. Muthukumar. The audio launch was held at Sathyam Cinemas in May 2008.

| Song | Singers |
|---|---|
| "Enakkena Pirandhavalo" | Karthik, Suchitra, Arun |
| "Enge Irundhai" | Harish Raghavendra |
| "Onnu Rendu" | Tippu, Ganga |
| "Pattampoochi" | Krish, Chinmayi |
| "Usilampatti Sandhaiyila" | Shankar Mahadevan, Mahalakshmi Iyer, Senthildass Velayutham |

== Reception ==
Pavithra Srinivasan of Rediff.com called it "silly and ridiculous" and also added "the culprit here clearly is V. V. Kathir's half-baked script that manages to destroy Jiiva's credibility. This flick is all aruvaal and no brains". Magimairajan of Kalki praised the acting of Jiiva and also praised the director for portraying transgender people in dignified manner but panned Srikanth Deva's music, Anal Arasu's stunt choreography and Ganja Karuppu's humour and felt the director who concentrated on racy dialogues should have done the same for screenplay. Cinesouth wrote, "Director Kadir has courageously used a far fetched story line and made a film out of it". Bangalore Mirror wrote, "Director Kadhir seems unaware of the strides made in storytelling methods in Tamil films. Not only has he stuck to an age-old narrative style, but also handed over the important responsibility of composing the musical score to Srikanth Deva whose work is ear-splitting".
