= Poonam Bajwa =

Indian actress and model

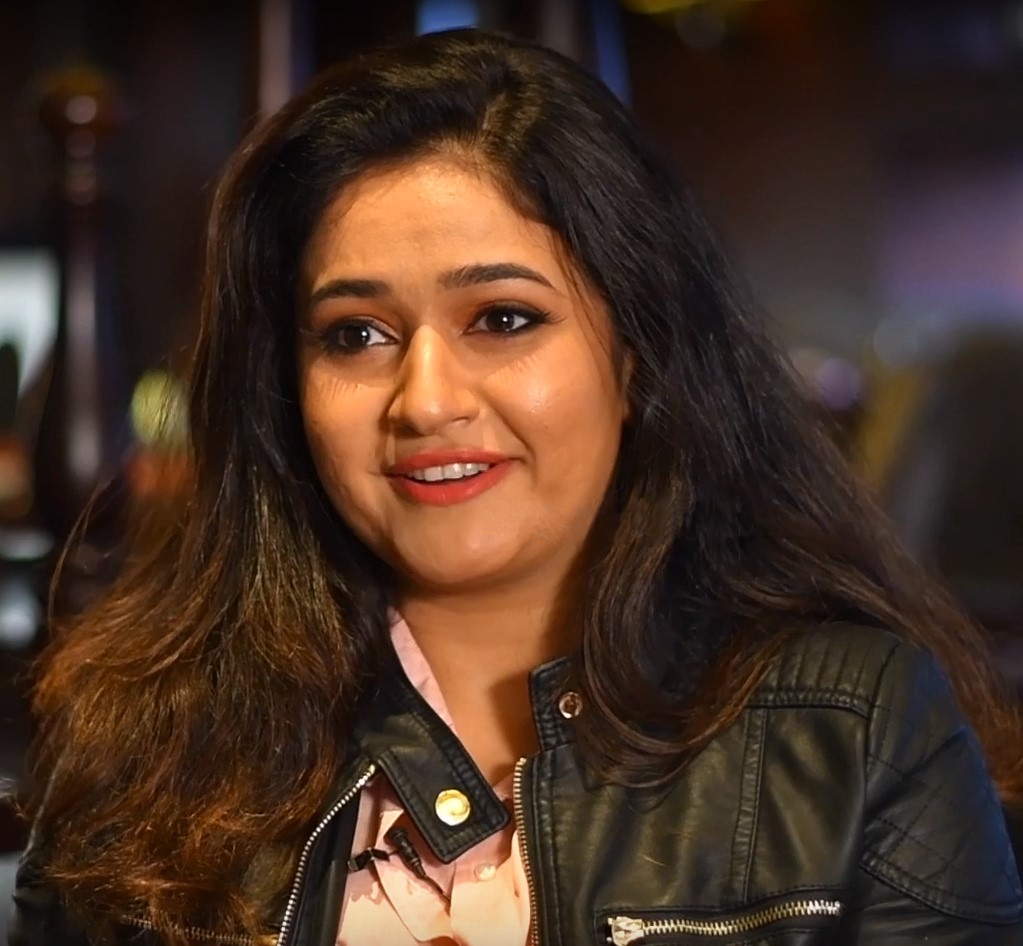
- Poonam Bajwa in 2019
- Born: Poonam Singh Bajwa; 5 April 1985 (age 41); Bombay, Maharashtra, India
- Education: Symbiosis International University, Pune (English Literature)
- Occupation: Actress
- Years active: 2005–2019,2022

Poonam Bajwa is an Indian actress who appears in Malayalam, Tamil and Telugu films. She made her acting debut in 2005 with the Telugu film Modati Cinema, followed by another Telugu film Boss (2006). Her debut Kannada- and Tamil- language movies were Thangigagi (2006) and Seval (2008), respectively.

== Early life and education ==
A Punjabi by birth, she was born in Bombay to Amarjit Singh Bajwa, a naval Officer and Jayalakshmi Bajwa. She has a younger sister, Deepika Bajwa. She was crowned Miss Pune in 2005, after which she started modeling part-time while studying. When she went to Hyderabad for a ramp show, the director of Modati Cinema spotted her and asked her if she was interested in films. She had finished her 12th then and had a five-month gap before college and hence agreed to star in his film, despite excelling in academics. She pursued a degree in English Literature from Symbiosis International University, Pune.

== Acting career ==
She made her acting debut in the 2005 Telugu film Modati Cinema, following which she appeared in several Telugu films, including Boss alongside Nagarjuna and Bhaskar's Parugu, in which she had a cameo appearance as Prakash Raj's elder daughter. She debuted in Tamil in 2008 with the Hari-directed masala film Seval and subsequently starred in Thenavattu and Kacheri Arambam, both co-starring Jeeva, and Drohi and Thambikottai. She acted in China Town, a Malayalam movie.

== Filmography ==
Key
†	Denotes films that have not yet been released

Year	Title	Role(s)	Language(s)	Notes	Ref.
2005	Modati Cinema	Sindhu	Telugu	Telugu Debut	
2006	Premante Inte	Pavani	Telugu		
2006	Boss	Sruthi Ramprakash	Telugu		
2006	Thangigagi	Priya	Kannada	Kannada Debut	
2007	Veduka	Harini	Telugu		
2008	Parugu	Subbalakshmi	Telugu		
2008	Seval	Parijatham Panjami	Tamil	Tamil Debut	
2008	Thenavattu	Gayathri	Tamil		
2010	Kacheri Arambam	Madhi	Tamil		
2010	Drohi	Shruthi / Lochani	Tamil		
2011	Thambikottai	Kanaga Amirthalingam	Tamil		
2011	China Town	Emily Gomez	Malayalam	Malayalam Debut	
2011	Venicile Vyapari	Mahalakshmi	Malayalam		
2012	Shikari	Renuka, Nanditha	Malayalam; Kannada		
2012	Manthrikan	Malu/Chandana	Malayalam		
2014	Peruchazhi	Herself	Malayalam	Special appearance in the song "Po Mone Dinesha"	
2015	Rosapookkalam	Lena Alexander	Malayalam		
2015	Aambala	Herself	Tamil	Special appearance in the song "Madras to Madurai"	
2015	Romeo Juliet	Nisha	Tamil		
2016	Mast Mohabbat	Maya	Kannada		
2016	Aranmanai 2	Manju	Tamil		
2016	Muthina Kathirikai	Maya	Tamil		
2017	Zacharia Pothen Jeevichirippundu	Mariya	Malayalam		
2017	Masterpiece	Smitha	Malayalam		
2019	N.T.R: Kathanayakudu	Garapati Lokeswari	Telugu		
2019	Kuppathu Raja	Mary	Tamil		
2022	Pathonpatham Noottandu	Queen of Travancore; Mathruppillil Kalyanikutty Amma	Malayalam		
2022	Mei Hoom Moosa	Kunjipaathu	Malayalam		
2022	Gurumoorthi	Tamizh	Tamil		
