= Modati Cinema =

- Theatrical Release poster
- Directed by: Kuchipudi Venkat
- Written by: Kuchipudi Venkat
- Produced by: Kunduru Ramana Reddy
- Starring: Navdeep; Poonam Bajwa
- Cinematography: Sameer Reddy
- Edited by: A. Sreekar Prasad
- Music by: Swaraj
- Production company: Abhisatvika Creations
- Release date: 21 October 2005
- Country: India
- Language: Telugu

Modati Cinema (transl. First movie) is a 2005 Indian Telugu-language romantic drama film written and directed by Kuchipudi Venkat and starring Navdeep and Poonam Bajwa. It was directed by to music by Swaraj.

Despite the film's failure, the comedy was well received.

== Plot ==
Sreeram is from a rich family. Sindhu is a middle-class girl with a nagging and greedy step-mother and a strict father. Sreeram is impressed by Sindhu at first sight. He helps her solve her family problems. In the process, she misunderstands him. The rest of the movie is all about how the two understand the power of their love and tie the knot on the same day they meet.

== Cast ==
- Navdeep as Sreeram
- Poonam Bajwa as Sindhu
- Brahmanandam
- Tanikella Bharani as Sindhu's uncle
- Harish Shankar as Harish
- Dharmavarapu Subrahmanyam as Subrahmanyam
- Rallapalli
- Suthivelu
- Ali
- Sunil
- Venu Madhav as Vankar Yadav
- L.B. Sriram
- Raghunatha Reddy
- Subhalekha Sudhakar as Sindhu's father
- Krishna Bhagawan
- Raghu Babu
- Gautam Raju
- Shankar Melkote
- Krishnudu
- Ravikanth
- Raj
- Duvvasi Mohan
- Chitram Srinu
- Srinivasa Reddy
- Meka Suresh
- Telangana Shakuntala ad Shakuntala
- Pavala Syamala
- Satya Krishnan as Satya

== Production ==
Initially, Kuchipudi Venkat narrated the story to Kunduru Ramana Reddy, but said that the budget was too high. The script was narrated to Lagadapati Sridhar before Kuchipudi Venkat reverted back to Kunduru Ramana Reddy. The music director Swaraj took four months to compose the soundtrack.

== Soundtrack ==
The music was composed by Swaraj. The audio release function was held in Club Jayabheri, Hyderabad on 29 September 2005. Y. V. Subba Reddy and Sirivennela Seetharama Sastry graced the function as guests.

No.	Title	Singer(s)	Length
1.	"Urime Megham"	Sonu Nigam, K.S. Chitra
2.	"Neeke Nuvve"	Shreya Ghoshal
3.	"Jallu Manada"	S. P. B. Charan, Suneetha
4.	"Chedyna Badyna" (Happy)	M. G. Sreekumar
5.	"Thaka Chuku"	Tippu, Sowmya Raoh
6.	"Urikee Chiru Chinuka"	Sri Ram Parthasarathy
7.	"Ninnyna Nadyna"	Shankar Mahadevan
8.	"Chedyna Badyna" (Sad)	M. G. Sreekumar

== Release and reception ==
The film was initially scheduled to release on 12 October 2005.

Jeevi of Idlebrain.com rated the film two-and-three-quarters out of five and wrote that "The basic point of destiny guiding a couple who just met into wedlock within a few hours is interesting. But the director tried to inject more comedy element (though is pretty hilarious in a couple of tracks) than what is necessary".
