= Thambikottai =

- Directed by: R. Ammu Ramesh
- Written by: R. Ammu Ramesh
- Produced by: R. K. Suresh
- Starring: Narain; Meena; Poonam Bajwa; Sangeetha
- Cinematography: Karnan
- Edited by: S. Surajkavee
- Music by: D. Imman
- Production company: Thambikkottai Rajeswari Films
- Release date: 11 February 2011
- Running time: 150 minutes
- Country: India
- Language: Tamil

Thambikottai (transl. Younger Brother's Fort) is a 2011 Indian Tamil-language masala film directed by R. Ammu Ramesh and produced by R. K. Suresh. It stars Narain, Meena, Poonam Bajwa and Sangeetha, with Prabhu, Santhanam, and Rajendran playing supporting roles. The music was composed by D. Imman with cinematography by Karnan. The film released on 11 February 2011. It received mixed reviews upon release but was a commercial success.

== Plot ==
Azhagiri is raised by his sister Shanmugapriya following their parents' early death. Azhagiri is a college student, while Priya is a lecturer. Azhagiri is closely bonded with his sister. Azhagiri goes to a village named Thambikottai for an NSS field trip, where he meets Kanaga, and they both fall in love. Kanaga is the younger daughter of a local goon Amirthalingam. Her elder sister Beeda Pandiamma is a rogue who often creates ruckuses in the village.

Kanaga goes to Chennai for her studies but is kept under continuous monitoring by her sister's henchmen as Pandiamma and Amirthalingam realize her love affair. Azhagiri skillfully takes Kanaga away to his home. However, Kanaga is again taken away from Azhagiri's home by Amirthalingam.

Priya is surprised to see Amirthalingam. She reveals a flashback, where the two siblings actually belong to Thambikottai, and their father Shanmugam was a bus driver working under Amirthalingam, who owned a transport service with several buses. However, all the buses were poorly maintained, and Amirthalingam bribed the officials to obtain the fitness certificates. Despite several attempts made by Shanmugam to convince Amirthalingam to properly repair the buses, he neglects. This infuriates Shanmugam, and he resigns as he does not want to risk passengers' lives. When Shanmugam's wife Lakshmi travels on Amirthalingam's bus, the brakes fail, the bus meets with an accident, and she passes away. The government seals Amirthalingam's bus company. Angered, Amirthalingam bombs the bridge connecting Thambikottai with the land. Hence, no buses could enter the village unless the bridge is repaired. Amirthalingam's men also kill Shanmugam.

Now, Azhagiri fights against Pandiamma's henchmen and rescues Kanaga. In the fight, Pandiamma is accidentally killed by one of her henchmen. Azhagiri also fights against Amirthalingam and helps reconstruct the broken bridge in Thambikottai.

== Cast ==
- Narain as Azhagiri Shanmugam
- Meena as Shanmugapriya Shanmugam, Azhagiri's sister
- Poonam Bajwa as Kanaga Amirthalingam, Azhagiri's love interest (Voice Dubbed By Renuka Kathir)
- Sangeetha as Beeda Pandiamma, Amirthalingam's elder daughter (Voice Dubbed By Jeyegeetha)
- Prabhu as Shanmugam, Azhagiri and Shanmugapriya's father
- Santhanam as Saissa, Azhagiri's friend
- Rajendran as Amirthalingam, Kanaga's father
- Vijayalakshmi as Lakshmi Shanmugam, Azhagiri and Shanmugapriya's mother
- M. S. Bhaskar as Valayapatti, Azhagiri's professor
- Ganja Karuppu as Karuppu
- Meera Krishnan as Kanaga's mother
- Sriranjani as Sridevi, the college principal
- Manobala as Puli
- Karate Raja as Amirthalingam's son-in-law
- Jasper as Amirthalingam's assistant
- Riyaz Khan as Goon
- Aarthi
- Lollu Sabha Easter
- Cool Suresh
- Ramdoss as Pandiamma's henchman (uncredited)

== Production ==
The film was launched at AVM Studios on 14 December 2009. Prabhu, Mysskin, Jayam Ravi, Mohan Raja, Kalaipuli S. Thanu, and Prasana were present for the function. The film takes place in a village named Thambikottai and revolves around the happenings of the village such as building a bridge. As of April 2010, the film shooting was almost complete. Due to the delay in post-production, the film was unable to release on Diwali or New Year's Eve of 2010.

== Music ==
The soundtrack was composed by D. Imman. All lyrics written by Viveka.

Thambikottai

Soundtrack album by D. Imman
- Released: 12 January 2011
- Recorded: 14 December 2009
- Venue: AVM Studios
- Genre: Feature film soundtrack
- Length: 23:47
- Language: Tamil

D. Imman chronology
Mynaa (2010)	Thambikottai (2011)	Mudhal Idam (2011)

Tracklist
No.	Title	Singers	Length
1.	"Thambikottai Kanaga"	Jassie Gift, Sujatha, Nrithya Andrews	5:05
2.	"Unakkaka Uireyvaithen"	Aalap Raju, Sriram Parthasarathy, Shweta Mohan	5:25
3.	"Vaa Pulla"	Velmurugan, Mukesh Mohamed, M. L. R. Karthikeyan, Senthildass Velayutham	5:19
4.	"Noorandu Vazhga"	Naresh Iyer, Anitha Karthikeyan	4:48
5.	"Pain of Love"	Sriram Parthasarathy, Shweta Mohan	3:10
Total length:			23:47

== Reception ==
Behindwoods gave the film 1/5 stars and wrote, "Ramesh tries to pack most of the ‘must have’s of a masala film resulting in an unexciting product."
