= Irudhi Suttru (soundtrack) =

2016 soundtrack album by Santhosh Narayanan

Soundtrack album by Santhosh Narayanan
- Released: 4 January 2016
- Recorded: 2014–2015
- Genre: Feature film soundtrack
- Length: 18:44
- Language: Tamil
- Labels: Lahari Music; T-Series
- Producer: Santhosh Narayanan

Santhosh Narayanan chronology
36 Vayadhinile (2015)	Irudhi Suttru (2016)	Kadhalum Kadandhu Pogum (2016)

Irudhi Suttru is the soundtrack album for the 2015 bilingual film of the same name starring R. Madhavan and Ritika Singh. The film directed by Sudha Kongara, is produced by YNOT Studios and UTV Motion Pictures.

The album featuring five songs, were composed by Santhosh Narayanan in Tamil and Hindi each, with lyrics written by Vivek, Muthamil and Swanand Kirkire. The soundtrack for the Hindi version was released on 2 January 2016, whereas the Tamil version was unveiled on 4 January 2016. Narayanan's step-daughter Dhee made her debut in playback singing by recording two of the tracks in the Tamil album.

== Background ==
Sudha Kongara wanted to bring Santhosh Narayanan on board after his work in Soodhu Kavvum was appreciated by Kongara after she attended a preview screening of the film. She informed to producer S. Sashikanth about it, with Sashikanth had a formal meeting with Santhosh in Australia, handed the script to the latter, for which he insisted to approach Kongara. During the meeting with Santhosh, Kongara showed the basic sketches of the film and the researches they made, for which Santhosh agreed. Sudha added that most of the songs in the film are situational which did not require any lip sync. After the script discussion, Santhosh started working on the song in his private studio so he want to internalize the tunes for the song and then work on it. After composing the song, Santhosh sent the sample tunes to Sudha.

== Composition ==
Lyricist Vivek who worked with the composer in 36 Vayadhinile wrote lyrics for four of the tracks, whereas Muthamil wrote one song for the film. Narayanan's step-daughter Dhee, made her debut as playback singer through the film; she recorded two songs with one of the tracks "Ey Sandakaara" was featured in the theatrical trailer of the film released in December 2015. Vijaynarain, who worked as the orchestral co-ordinator at Studios 301 in Sydney, while also serving as the backing vocalist for A. R. Rahman's albums, was asked to record one of the songs in the soundtrack titled "Maya Visai" (and its Hindi version "Jaaga Khunnas"). Sri Shyamalangan, who also worked with Santhosh as a record producer also sang the song along with Santhosh.

While Santhosh Narayanan composed the background score for the film's Tamil version, Sanjay Wandrekar and Atul Raninga composed the score for the Hindi version, after their association with Rajkumar Hirani (the presenter of the Hindi version) in 3 Idiots (2010) and PK (2014), where they composed the film score. Santhosh took charge of composing the songs for the Hindi version, with Swanand Kirkire writing the lyrics.

== Release ==
The audio rights of Irudhi Suttru were purchased by Lahari Music, which marked their direct debut in Tamil music scene after their albums Baahubali: The Beginning and Rudhramadevi attained tremendous response in Tamil; whereas the rights for its Hindi version Saala Khadoos were purchased by T-Series. The album of the Hindi version Saala Khadoos released first, through digital streaming services on 2 January 2016. Later the track list of the Tamil soundtrack released on 4 January 2016, with the album being unveiled at a grand launch event held at Sathyam Cinemas in Chennai the same day. Rajkumar Hirani, who presented the Hindi version of the film Saala Khadoos, graced the event as the chief guest along with Suriya, Bala and Siddharth; other celebrities along with the cast and crew attended the event. Two songs and theatrical trailer of the film were screened at the event. The audio CD of the film was unveiled by Suriya, Bala, Hirani to the public.

== Track listing ==
Tamil

All lyrics are written by Vivek, except where noted.

No.	Title	Singer(s)	Length
1.	"Poda Poda"	Pradeep Kumar	4:00
2.	"Ey Sandakaara"	Dhee	4:10
3.	"Maya Visai"	Vijaynarain, Sri Shyamalingam, Santhosh Narayanan	4:20
4.	"Usuru Narumbeley"	Dhee	3:11
5.	"Vaa Machaney" (Lyrics written by Muthamil)	Sean Roldan	3:03
Total length:			18:44

Hindi

All lyrics are written by Swanand Kirkire.

No.	Title	Singer(s)	Length
1.	"Saala Khadoos"	Vishal Dadlani	4:14
2.	"Dil Ye Ladaku"	Monali Thakur	3:22
3.	"Jagaa Khunnas"	Vishal Dadlani, Vijaynarain	4:19
4.	"Dhuaan Hai Dhuaan Zindagi"	Kalyani Nair	3:10
5.	"Jhalli Patakha"	Sunidhi Chauhan	3:03
Total length:			17:58

== Reception ==
The Tamil version of the soundtrack opened to positive reviews from critics. Behindwoods wrote in its review "Typical Santhosh in full form" and gave a rating of 3.25 out of 5. Siddharth Srinivas in his music review for Sify, gave a rating of 3.5 out of 5 and wrote "The best thing about Irudhi Suttru is how the album hints you about the film all over, without dropping any big notes. The orchestration is mostly minimal, but the lasting effect is created with ease. Although the soundtrack does impress on the whole, Santhosh must be lauded for using Dhee in the right way in Ei Sandakara and Usuru Narumbula, for she in turn comes out with flying colours. Irudhi Suttru is an album you will want to have on your CD rack."

Indiaglitz gave a rating of 3.25 out of 5 and stated it as "a fresh and pumped album from Santhosh". Vipin Nair of Music Aloud rated the soundtrack 8 out of 10, saying, "Santhosh Narayanan starts the year with a thoroughly entertaining soundtrack that works a tad better in Tamil". Studioflicks rated the album 3 out of 5 and wrote "Santosh Narayanan is back with a bang with a complete package of emotions and joy conveyed through the songs. Well for Madhavan, it's been a long time we got to see a fabulous album and this one is more engrossing." Moviecrow rated the album 3.5 out of 5 and stated "Santosh Narayanan once again proves that he can deliver the highly listenable album with enough experimentation in tune and orchestration."

The Hindi version of the soundtrack received mixed response. Writing for The Times of India, Kasmin Fernandes gave the soundtrack a rating of 3 out of 5 stating it as "a diverse effort despite the narrow scope for musicality". Critic Joginder Tuteja in his review for Bollywood Hungama, gave a mixed review saying "The music of Saala Khadoos stays strictly situational and doesn't have much to offer beyond the theatrical run of the film" giving a score 2 out of 5. Aelina Kapoor in her review for Rediff.com called the album as a "mixed bag" and further went on to say "While none of the songs will go all the way, a couple of them fit in well and promise a good narrative", giving a rating 2.5 out of 5. Karthik Srinivasan of Milliblog wrote "Santhosh's Hindi debut doesn't break new ground like in Tamil, but it's immensely listenable." Suanshu Khurana of The Indian Express gave 2.5 out of 5 saying "The five tunes in Saala Khadoos, come with a combination of unique personalities and absolutely, scrappy, nonentities."

== Other versions ==
Santhosh Narayanan reused the entire soundtrack for the Telugu remake of the film titled Guru starring Venkatesh and Ritika Singh which had six tracks in total. One of the songs "Jingidi" being originally composed by Santhosh for this film, was recorded by actor Venkatesh.
