= Rudhramadevi (soundtrack) =

Soundtrack album for Telugu historical film

Soundtrack album to Rudhramadevi by Ilaiyaraaja
- Released: 25 July 2015
- Recorded: Royal Philharmonic Orchestra, London, United Kingdom
- Genre: Feature film soundtrack
- Length: 27:51
- Label: Lahari Music
- Producer: Ilaiyaraaja

Ilaiyaraaja chronology
Yevade Subramanyam (2015)	Rudhramadevi (2015)	Abbayitho Ammayi (2016)

Rudhramadevi is the soundtrack to the 2015 Telugu historical film of the same name directed by Gunasekhar. The film stars Anushka Shetty, Allu Arjun, Rana Daggubati and Krishnam Raju. The soundtrack album and background score were composed by Ilaiyaraaja. The audio music was planned to release separately in Telangana and Andhra Pradesh states having the Chief ministers of these states as chief guests. The songs were released simultaneously in Visakhapatnam and Warangal on 25 July 2015.

The soundtrack for the Tamil version were released on 15 August 2015 and the Malayalam version was released on 4 September 2015, respectively.

== Track listing ==
All lyrics are written by Sirivennela Sitaramasastri.

Rudhramadevi (Original Motion Picture Soundtrack - Telugu)
No.	Title	Singer(s)	Length
1.	"Matthagajame"	S. P. Balasubrahmanyam, K. S. Chithra, Kailash Kher	5:45
2.	"Auna Neevena"	Hariharan, Sadhana Sargam	5:25
3.	"Choosukovo Teesukovo"	K. S. Chithra, Baba Sehgal	4:57
4.	"Punnami Puvvai"	Shreya Ghoshal	4:35
5.	"Allakallolamai"	S. P. Balasubrahmanyam	2:03
6.	"Anthapuramlo"	K. S. Chithra, Sadhana Sargam, Chinmayi Sripaada	4:46
Total length:			27:51

All lyrics are written by Pa. Vijay.

Rudhramadevi (Tamil dubbed)
No.	Title	Singer(s)	Length
1.	"Unnal Un Munnal"	Hariharan, Sadhana Sargam
2.	"Suthadada Kathadada"	Ramya NSK, Shreya Ghoshal, Sunidhi Chauhan
3.	"Pournami Pole Vilayaada Vaa"	Vibhavari
4.	"Rajathi Raja Sri Ganapathi"	S. P. Balasubrahmanyam, Senthildass Velayutham & Chorus
5.	"Allal Allolamaai"	S. P. Balasubrahmanyam, Benny Dayal
6.	"Anthapurathil"	K. S. Chithra, Sadhana Sargam, Chinmayee & Chorus

All lyrics are written by Sudhamsu.

Rudhramadevi (Malayalam dubbed)
No.	Title	Singer(s)	Length
1.	"Kumudam Poove"	Mridula Warrier	4:20
2.	"Anthappurathilo Arayanna"	Mridula Warrier, Sithara, Renjini Jose	4:08
3.	"Mounam Nirvethiam"	Sudeep Kumar, Sithara	3:51
4.	"Matha Gajame"	Anwar Sadath, Renjini Jose	5:47
5.	"Thullunnuvo"	Kripa	3:25
Total length:			21:31

All lyrics are written by Raqueeb Alam, Sudhakar Sharma and Vimal Kashyap.

Rudhramadevi (Hindi dubbed)
No.	Title	Singer(s)	Length
1.	"Naina Tu Sunaina"	Javed Ali, Sadhana Sargam
2.	"Pushpa Koi Viksit Huya"	Palak Muchhal
3.	"Rajathi Raja Shri Ganapati"	Kailash Kher & Chorus
4.	"Anthakaran Hai Mehka Huya Sa"	Sadhana Sargam, Pamela Jain, Priyanka Bhattacharya & Chorus
