= Kacheri Aarambam =

- Film poster
- Directed by: Thiraivannan
- Written by: Thiraivannan
- Produced by: R. B. Choudary
- Starring: Jiiva; Poonam Bajwa; J. D. Chakravarthy
- Cinematography: Vaidy S.
- Edited by: Jaishankar
- Music by: D. Imman
- Production company: Super Good Films
- Distributed by: Mayoorshan Yogaratnam
- Release date: 19 March 2010
- Running time: 150 minutes
- Country: India
- Language: Tamil

Kacheri Aarambam (transl. The Concert Begins) is a 2010 Indian Tamil-language action comedy film written and directed by Thiraivannan in his debut, and produced by R. B. Choudary. The film stars Jiiva and Poonam Bajwa, while J. D. Chakravarthy and Vadivelu play supporting roles. The music was composed by D. Imman with cinematography by Vaidy S and editing by Jaishankar. The film was released on 19 March 2010.

== Plot ==
The film starts with a flashback as Paari is on a train looking back at everything that occurred. The beginning introduces a remote village in Ramanathapuram and shows the main character, Paari. Paari is a do-gooder helping everyone in need. A magnanimous man, he gives anything and everything to others if they ask for it. For example, at a wedding, he gives his bike to the groom, when the latter does not get one from the bride's father as a dowry. He also gives a group of homeless people 0.1 million rupees from a bank loan which his father Vasu had asked for. Promising his father to earn more, Paari sets out to Chennai but faces many challenges. He meets a young girl Madhi and falls in love with her but some goons also cause trouble for Paari. Meanwhile, Sivamani, the dreaded but sophisticated crime boss of the city, is getting ready to marry Madhi. When the two stories meet, chaos ensues. It is up to Paari and Sivamani to sort it out.

== Cast ==
- Jiiva as Paari
- Poonam Bajwa as Madhi (Voice Dubbed By Renuka Kathir)
- J. D. Chakravarthy as Royapuram Sivamani
- Vadivelu as Deepavali
- Sivaranjini as Paari's mother
- Azhagam Perumal as Vasu, Paari's father
- Kadhal Dhandapani as Maasilamani
- Aarthi as Madhi's friend
- Ansiba Hassan as Sumati
- Karate Raja as Varadhan
- Bharathi Kannan as Kerala Astrologer
- King Kong as Deepavali's laborer
- Crane Manohar as Deepavali's laborer
- Thiraivannan (cameo appearance)
- Nisha Kothari in an item number

== Soundtrack ==
The music was composed by D. Imman.

Track listing
No.	Title	Lyrics	Singer(s)	Length
1.	"Azhagu Azhagu"	Viveka	Bela Shende	1:44
2.	"Kadavule Kadavule"	Na. Muthukumar	Palash Sen	5:03
3.	"Kacheri Kacheri"	Viveka	Mukesh Mohamed, Madhushree	4:40
4.	"Vaada Vaada"	Thiraivannan	Anitha Karthikeyan, M. L. R. Karthikeyan, Watta Bottles	5:13
5.	"Vithai Vithai"	Na. Muthukumar	Shaan	4:47
6.	"Kadavule A Rock Start"	Na. Muthukumar	D. Imman, Maria Roe Vincent, V. P. Arun	4:18
Total length:				25:45

== Critical reception ==
Rediff.com wrote, "Of logic, rationale or sincere story-telling, there's no evidence as the team informs you frankly, at the beginning. So give your brains a rest, and enjoy this typical masala entertainer". Chennai Online wrote, "Debutant director Thiraivannan shows ample evidence that he can’t make a commercial entertainer without sacrificing sense or logic. Kacheri Aarambam is a barely acceptable only if you are willing to make a Faustian bargain, i.e., give logic the slip". Deccan Herald wrote, "The concert begins, so says its title. But this ‘Kacheri...’ is outrageously off-key. More so it does not soothe or entertain". IANS wrote, "Debutant director Thiraivannan seems to be content with a cliched story and, hence, takes no strain to tell us anything new or novel".
