= Kabali (soundtrack) =

2016 soundtrack album by Santhosh Narayanan

- Album cover

Soundtrack album by Santhosh Narayanan
- Released: 12 June 2016
- Recorded: 2015–2016
- Genre: Feature film soundtrack
- Length: 20:15
- Label: Think Music
- Producer: Santhosh Narayanan

Santhosh Narayanan chronology
Iraivi (2016)	Kabali (2016)	Kodi (2016)

Singles from Kabali
- 1. "Thoondil Meen (Bonus Track)" Released: 5 August 2016

Kabali is the soundtrack album, composed by Santhosh Narayanan for the 2016 Indian Tamil-language action crime film of the same name written and directed by Pa. Ranjith and produced by Kalaipuli S. Thanu, starring Rajinikanth, Radhika Apte and Winston Chao. The soundtrack album featuring five songs with lyrics written by Kabilan, Vivek, Umadevi and Arunraja Kamaraj was released on 12 June 2016, at Chennai and was also released in Telugu, Hindi and Malay languages. Santhosh Narayanan won the Best Music Director Award at the 2017 Ananda Vikatan Cinema Awards. Initially, he was nominated for the Best Music Director – Tamil award at the 2017 Filmfare Awards South, along with Arunraja Kamaraj, for Best Lyricist – Tamil, Best Male Playback Singer – Tamil for the song "Neruppu Da". However, Shweta Mohan won the Filmfare Award for Best Female Playback Singer – Tamil for "Maya Nadhi".

== Overview ==
"Ulagam Oruvanukka" is the introduction song of the film sung by Ananthu, Santhosh Narayanan, Gana Bala with lyrics written by Kabilan, Vivek and Roshan Jamrock performed the rap portions of the song. The second song, "Maya Nadhi" by Ananthu, Pradeep Kumar, Shweta Mohan written by Umadevi is a melodious song. Sharanya CR, from The Times of India, who reviewed the album, stated that it "evokes a subtle intimacy."

"Veera Thurandhara" is the third song from the film sung by Gana Bala, were Pradeep Kumar lent additional vocals and Lawrence R and Roshan Jamrock performed the rap portions of the film. "Vaanam Paarthaen" is a slow-paced melody number, sung by Pradeep Kumar, and is about a lost love/lost life. "Neruppu Da" is an energetic number sung and written by Arunraja Kamaraj, with dialogues by Rajinikanth.

"Thoondil Meen" is the bonus track of the film, sung by Pradeep, Kalyani and Dhee. It is a reprise of "Vaanam Paarthaen".

== Release ==
Think Music acquired the audio rights for the Tamil version, as well as the dubbed Telugu, Hindi and Malay versions. Initially, producer S. Thanu decided to organise a grand audio launch event in Malaysia, on 30 May, where both the Tamil and Telugu versions will be released. Later, the makers decided to push the audio launch to 11 June, and then to 13 June, and 12 June 2016. On 11 June, however, a cthrity-second clip was leaked on the internet, prompting the album to be released a day ahead of schedule. The tracklist of the film had been released a few days earlier, on 9 June 2016.

The event was held at the presence of crew members, director Pa. Ranjith, composer Santhosh Narayanan, producer S. Thanu and Soundarya Rajinikanth in attendance, the first copy of the audio CD was handed over to Soundarya, by the crew members. Lyric videos for the songs were released by Think Musicthrough their official YouTube channel on 12 June 2016. The song teaser of "Neruppu Da" was released on 16 June 2016, and it was viewed 9 million times.

The audio of the Telugu version was released on 26 June 2016 at a pre-release event held in Hyderabad. A Malay version with two songs was released on 1 July 2016.

An unreleased track "Thoondil Meen", was released on 24 August 2016.

== Track listing ==
Tamil
No.	Title	Writer(s)	Singer(s)	Length
1.	"Ulagam Oruvanukka"	Kabilan, Vivek, Roshan Jamrock	Ananthu, Santhosh Narayanan, Gana Bala, Roshan Jamrock	4:02
2.	"Maya Nadhi"	Uma Devi K	Ananthu, Pradeep Kumar, Shweta Mohan	4:35
3.	"Veera Thurandhara"	Umadevi, Roshan Jamrock	Gana Bala, Lawrence R, Pradeep Kumar, Roshan Jamrock	3:17
4.	"Vaanam Paarthen"	Kabilan	Pradeep Kumar	4:52
5.	"Neruppu Da"	Arunraja Kamaraj	Arunraja Kamaraj, Rajinikanth	3:38
6.	"Thoondil Meen" (Bonus Track)	Kabilan	Pradeep Kumar, Dhee, Kalyani Nair	5:00
Total length:				25:05

Telugu
No.	Title	Writer(s)	Singer(s)	Length
1.	"Okade Okkokokade"	Anantha Sriram, Vivek	Ananthu, Vasudevan, Senthildass Velayutham, Roshan Jamrock	4:04
2.	"Gunde Ninna Yenno"	Anantha Sriram	Ananthu, Pradeep Kumar, Shweta Mohan	4:25
3.	"Ugra Trinetura"	Ramajogayya Sastry	Ganesh Ram, Roshan Jamrock	3:17
4.	"Kalavani O Nadhi"	Vanamali	Pradeep Kumar	4:51
5.	"Nippu Raa"	Vanamali	Arunraja Kamaraj	3:39
Total length:				20:16

All lyrics are written by Raqueeb Alam.

Hindi
No.	Title	Singer(s)	Length
1.	"Jag Hei Ye Dabang Ka"	Santhosh Narayanan, Rohit Fernandes	4:04
2.	"Jadoo Rawan Rawan"	Ananthu, Pradeep Kumar, Shreya Ghoshal, Sanjana Kalmanje	4:25
3.	"Veeron Ki Bheed Mein"	Francois Castellino	3:17
4.	"Taare Saare Chupke"	Pradeep Kumar	4:50
5.	"Aag Hun Main"	Arunraja Kamaraj, Suraj Jagan	3:39
Total length:			20:16

All lyrics are written by Rabbit Mac, Narayani Balasubramaniam, and Shahtia Ashvin, except where noted.

Malay
No.	Title	Lyrics	Singer(s)	Length
1.	"Membara"		Bandi Arnuk	3:35
2.	"Wilayah Kabali"		Rabbit Mac, Waris	4:04
3.	"Bagai Sungai Maya"	R.Zubair	Arvind Raj, Dasha Logan	4:30
Total length:				12:09

== Background score ==
Kabali

Film score by Santhosh Narayanan
- Released: 10 August 2016
- Recorded: 2015–2016
- Genre: Film score
- Length: 27:19
- Label: Think Music
- Producer: Santhosh Narayanan

The original background score composed by Santhosh Narayanan was released on 10 August 2016. It features nineteen original compositions used from the film. The scores were released in jukebox format through YouTube, and digitally through all streaming platforms.

Kabali: Music from the Motion Picture
No.	Title	Length
1.	"43 Gang"	1:40
2.	"Dealings"	1:04
3.	"Evil Minds"	0:31
4.	"Face Off"	2:18
5.	"Kabaleeswaran"	0:58
6.	"Kabali Whistle (Theme)"	0:42
7.	"Kabali's Little Girl"	1:29
8.	"Kabali's Reunion"	0:55
9.	"Kozhi Kari"	1:19
10.	"Kumudhavalli"	2:38
11.	"SK Reveals Himself"	1:38
12.	"Maya Nadhi Piano"	1:18
13.	"Straight Outta Jail"	2:07
14.	"Tamilmaran"	0:47
15.	"The Beginning of the End"	2:24
16.	"The Don"	2:15
17.	"The Search for Kumudhavalli"	1:16
18.	"Tony Li"	1:10
19.	"Under Attack"	0:50
Total length:		27:19

== Reception ==
Professional ratings
Review scores
Source	Rating
Behindwoods	3.25/5 stars
Moviecrow	3.25/5 stars
IndiaGlitz	3.75/5 stars
Studioflicks	3.75/5 stars
Filmfare	4.0/5 stars

Sharanya CR from The Times of India, Behindwoods, Indiaglitz Studioflicks, The Indian Express, and Filmfare all reviewed the album positively Moviecrow rated the album 3.25 out of 5, and praised it for "stay[ing] true to its maternal content". India Today described it as "A phenomenal theme music and an intriguing soundtrack from Santhosh Narayanan."

== Chart performance ==
The album was listened to by people in India, Malaysia, Singapore, USA, UAE and UK. While the lyric videos received 10 million views on YouTube, the song "Neruppu Da" topped the charts of Saavn, on Top 15 Weekly Countdown, iTunes and as well as local radio channels. The audio CDs of Kabali had a record breaking sales, which was confirmed by Swaroop Reddy of Think Music in a press interaction.

The album became one of the most streamed songs of Jiosaavn. Paramdeep Singh, co-founder and Executive Chairman of Saavn said."The Kabali album is all set to enter the Top 10 streamed Tamil albums of all timeon Saavn soon. It is clearly one of the most talked about regional albums of the year thus far."

== Album credits ==
All songs composed by Santhosh Narayanan.

Musician credits

- Guitars - Keba Jeremiah, Pradeep Kumar (Acoustic & Slide), Joseph Vijay, Jhanu Chantar (Electric)
- Flute - Vishnu Vijay
- Bass - Naveen, Jhanu Chantar, Pradeep Kumar
- Drums - Tapass Naresh
- Additional Keys - Sat Richard
- Trumpet - Vijay
- Flute - Vishnu Vijay
- Pianica - Sajan Shenoy
- Strings - Macedonian Radio Symphonic Orchestra
- Percussion Arranged and Recorded By - R. K. Sundar
- Backing Vocals - Pradeep Kumar, Sanjana Kalmanje, Vijaynarain, Sri Shyamalangan
- Chorus - Vasudevan, Senthil Das, Sam, Sunderrajan, Balaji, Murali

Sound Engineers

- Adam Wilkinson, RK Sundar, Simon Todkill (Studios 301, Sydney)
- Rahul Ramachandran (Studio M1, Macedonia)
- Vishnu Vijay (Krimson Avenue Studios, Chennai)

Production

- All songs recorded at
  - Future Tense Studios, Prism Sounds Studios, Krimson Avenue Studios (Chennai)
  - Studios 301 (Sydney)
  - Studio M1 (Macedonia)
- Mixed by - Santhosh Narayanan, RK Sundar
- Mastered by - Leon Zeros, Sat Richard
- Musicians Coordinator - Meenakshi Iyer
- Musicians Fixer - B. Velavan
