= Srinisha Jayaseelan =

Indian playback singer (born 1999)

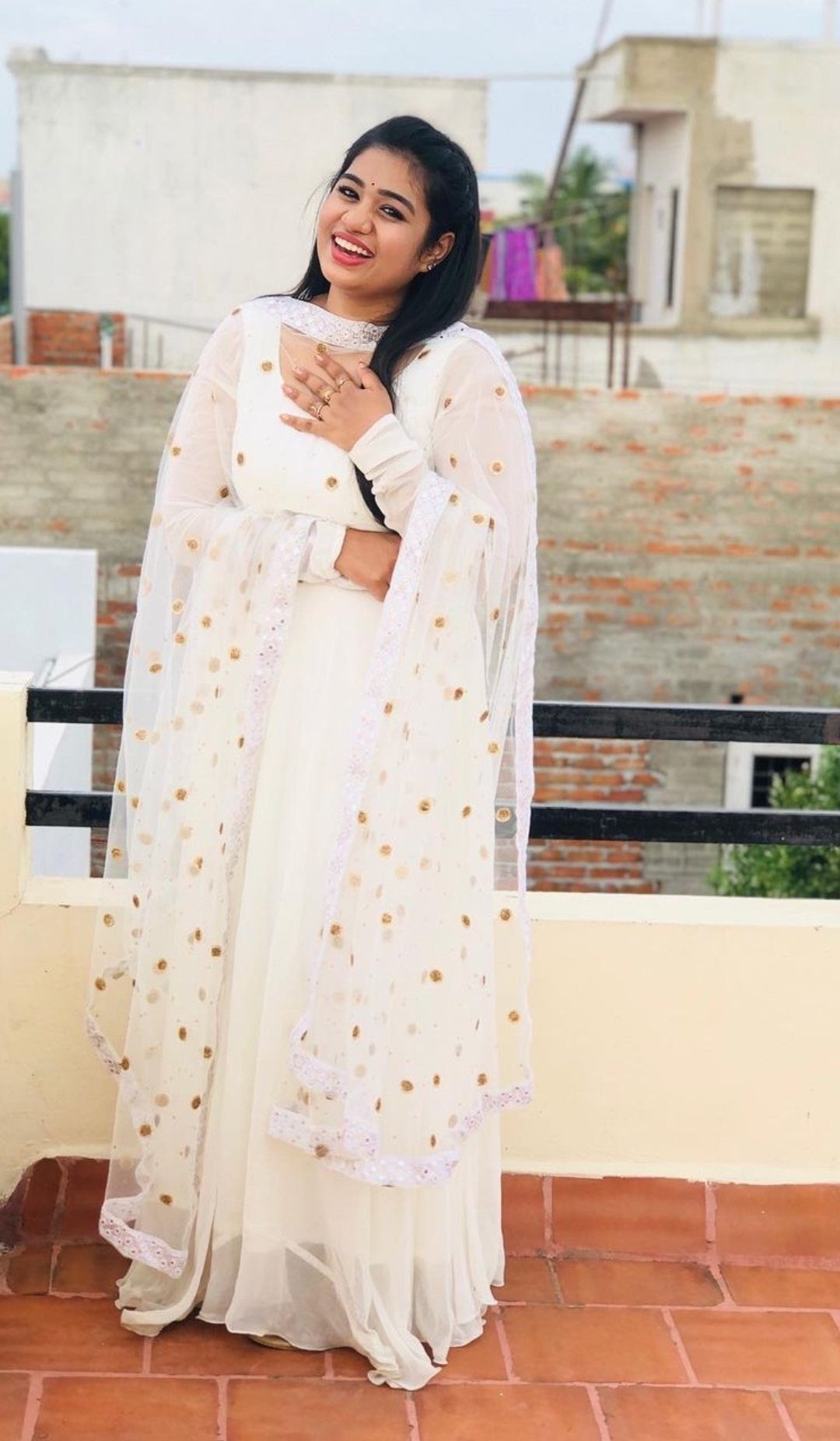
- Srinisha in 2021
- Born: 26 September 1995 (age 31); Chennai, Tamil Nadu, India
- Education: Ethiraj College for Women
- Occupation: Singer
- Years active: 2016 – present
- Notable work: Kanna Veesi • Adi Penne • Kannoram
- Father: Jayaseelan

Srinisha Jayaseelan (born 26 September 1995) is an Indian playback singer. In 2009-2010, she participated in the reality show Airtel Super Singer Junior 2 as a contestant, which was telecasted on Star Vijay. She made her debut as a playback singer in the movie Amma Kanakku under the music composition of Ilaiyaraaja in 2016, and participated in the reality show Super Singer Champion of Champions.

== Early life ==
Srinisha was born in Chennai, Tamil Nadu to Selvaraj Jayaseelan and Sujatha Jayaseelan. She did her schooling in TST Rajah Girls Matriculation Higher Secondary School, Chennai and later completed her bachelor's degree in commerce at Ethiraj College for Women.

== Career ==
=== Television ===
Srinisha debuted on television in the second season of Super Singer Junior. She was eliminated from the competition as a semi-finalist. She later appeared as a guest performer and backing vocalist in subsequent seasons of the show, and competed in other Vijay TV music competitions. Srinisha was also a part of the team 'Chennai Rockstars' in the first season and team 'White Devils' in the second season of the Super Singer T20. 'White Devils' team was crowned the title winner of the competition after delivering outstanding performances during the finals and throughout the competition.

In the year 2020, she gained popularity through her performances when she participated in the reality show Super Singer Champion of Champions featuring the Super Singer Stars, where she performed along with her team 'Bachelor Band' that included playback singer Sam Vishal and DJ Sudhan a.k.a. DJ Black. According to sources, Bachelor Band was the first ever team to use a DJ in a musical show in the south. With this unique combo of musicians, they made their way into the finals as a direct finalist along with the Nighty Boys (Srinivasan Raghunathan, Diwakar and Manoj) and the Ooo Team' (Maalavika Sundar, Santhosh Hariharan and Rangapriya).

=== As playback singer ===
Srinisha's debut as a playback singer was in the year 2016 when she sang the song 'Maths Tough' for Music Director Ilaiyaraaja in the movie Amma Kanakku. She had earlier sung a song for Music Director Yuvan Shankar Raja for the film Avan Ivan in the year 2011.

Vilambara Idaiveli from Imaikkaa Nodigal.

=== As an Independent singer ===
Kanna Veesi from Kadhal Ondru Kanden and Adi Penne, Kannoram and Vaa En Uyire by Stephen Zechariah from the Naam series are few of her notable works.

== Television ==
| Year | Name of Television Show | Role | Network |
|---|---|---|---|
| 2024 | Super Singer Season 10 | Guest performer | Star Vijay |

== Discography ==
=== Film songs ===
| Year | Song | Film | Composer | Language | Co-singers | Ref. |
|---|---|---|---|---|---|---|
| 2014 | 'Oru Malayoram' Pullanguzhal | Avan Ivan Gugan | Yuvan Shankar Raja Guru Kalyan | Tamil Tamil | Vijay Yesudas, Priyanka & Nithyashree | |
| 2016 | 'Maths Tough' | Amma Kanakku | Ilaiyaraaja | Tamil | | |
| 2016 | 'Paravai Parandhuchu' | Kadhalum Kadandhu Pogum | Santhosh Narayanan | Tamil | Pragathi Guruprasad | |
| 2017 | 'Chilaka Chilaka' | Pelli Roju | Justin Prabhakaran | Telugu | Saisharan | |
| 2018 | 'Vilambara Idaiveli' | Imaikkaa Nodigal | Hiphop Tamizha | Tamil | Hiphop Tamizha, Christopher Stanley & Sudarshan Ashok | |
| 2018 | 'Mohini Rage' | Mohini | Vivek–Mervin | Telugu | Prashanthi, Vignesh Natarajan | |
| 2018 | 'Phoenix Paravai' | Tamizh Padam 2 | Kannan (music director) | Tamil | | |
| 2019 | 'Modern Muniyamma' | Vantha Rajavathaan Varuven | Hiphop Tamizha | Tamil | Anthakudi Ilayaraja | |
| 2019 | 'Nee Sirichalum' | Action | Hiphop Tamizha | Tamil | Sadhana Sargam & Jonita Gandhi | |
| 2020 | 'Kanna Veesi' | Kadhal Ondru Kanden (Short Film) | Siddhu Kumar | Tamil | Rahul Hariharan | |
| 2021 | 'Sollamathan' | Pulikkuthi Pandi | N.R.Raghunanthan | Tamil | | |
| 2021 | 'Yedanu Veenaga' | Vikram Rathode | Ilaiyaraaja | Telugu | Sri Krishna | |
| 2021 | 'Ayyo Enakkulle' | Kuzhali | DM Udhayakumar | Tamil | | |
| 2021 | 'Yedhuvo Yedhuvo' | Murungakkai | Premkumar Sivaperuman | Tamil | | |
| 2021 | 'Vaa Vengaiye' | 99 Songs | A. R. Rahman | Tamil | Sarthak Kalyani, Swagat Rathod & Shiv | |
| 2021 | 'No Mattum Solladha' | Login | Vibin R | Tamil | G. V. Prakash Kumar | |
| 2021 | 'Cruella De Vil' | Cruella | Nicholas Britell | Telugu | | |
| 2021 | 'Seruvom Seruvom' | Laabam | D. Imman | Tamil | Cleo VII | |
| 2021 | 'Mayakkathe Maaya Kanna' | Sabhaapathy | Sam C. S. | Tamil | | |
| 2022 | 'Ready Steady Go' | Anbarivu | Hiphop Tamizha | Tamil | Santhosh Narayanan, Chinna Ponnu | |
| 2022 | 'Kanavugal' | Anbarivu | Hiphop Tamizha | Tamil | Benny Dayal, Sam Vishal, Bamba Bakya Sridhar Sena, Shilvi & Maanasi.K | |
| 2022 | "Theera Nadhi" | Nadhi | Dhibu Ninan Thomas | Tamil | Kapil Kapilan | |
| 2022 | 'Vandhaale Vandhaale' | Irumban | Srikanth Deva | Tamil | Anthony Daasan | |
| 2022 | 'Thedi Thedi' | Maayon | Ilaiyaraaja | Tamil | T. K. Karthikeyan | |
| 2022 | 'Whistle' | The Warriorr | Devi Sri Prasad | Tamil | Anthony Daasan | |
| 2022 | 'Whistle' | The Warriorr | Devi Sri Prasad | Telugu | Anthony Daasan | |
| 2022 | 'Yennadiye Yennadiye' | Yenni Thuniga | Sam C. S. | Tamil | Haricharan | |
| 2022 | 'Manniley' | Poikkal Kudhirai | D. Imman | Tamil | | |
| 2022 | 'Ranga Ranga Vaibhavanga' | Ranga Ranga Vaibhavanga | Devi Sri Prasad | Telugu | Sagar | |
| 2022 | 'Seenu Dolu' | Title | Anal Akash | Tamil | Anthony Daasan, Anal Akash | |
| 2022 | 'Kylaa' | Captain | D. Imman | Telugu | Yazin Nizar | |
| 2022 | 'Veadanae' | Alluri | Harshavardhan Rameshwar | Telugu | | |
| 2022 | 'Jillu Jakkamma' | Vallan | Santhosh Dhayanidhi | Tamil | Andrea Jeremiah | |
| 2022 | 'Nijamaai Nigazhum' | Dear Death | Navin Annamalai | Tamil | Sabari Darshan | |
| 2024 | "Life Is This Beautiful" | Siddharth Roy | Radhan | Telugu | Karthik | |
| 2024 | 'Achacho' | Aranmanai 4 | Hiphop Thamizha | Tamil | Kharesma Ravichandran | |
| 2024 | 'Kulukku Kulukku' | Inga Naan Thaan Kingu | D. Imman | Tamil | D. Imman | |
| 2025 | 'Madhuvaramae' | Dragon | Leon James (composer) | Telugu | Sarath Santosh | |
| 2026 | 'Idhu Enna Maayam' | Mellisai | Shankar Rangarajan (composer) | Tamil | Solo singing | |

=== Non-film songs ===
| Year | Song | Album | Composer | Language | Co-singers | Ref. |
|---|---|---|---|---|---|---|
| 2020 | 'Kuyavane Kuyavane' | | Gnani | Tamil | | |
| 2020 | 'Maraiyadha Kanneer Illai' | | Jen Martin | Tamil | | |
| 2021 | 'Kanavil Naane ' | | Vinoth Chandar | Tamil | Nikhil mathew | |
| 2021 | 'Imai Visiri' | | Amal Manohar | Tamil | Haricharan | |
| 2021 | 'Unne Nenachaen' | Naam | Stephen Zechariah | Tamil | Stephen Zechariah | |
| 2021 | 'En Anbe' | Naam | Stephen Zechariah | Tamil | Stephen Zechariah | |
| 2021 | 'Adi Penne’ | Naam | Stephen Zechariah | Tamil | Stephen Zechariah | |
| 2021 | 'Criminal Crush' | | Godson Rudolph | Tamil | Anirudh Ravichander | |
| 2021 | 'Pani Kaatraai' | | Velayutham Rajendran | Tamil | | |
| 2021 | 'En Kadhala' | Naatpadu Theral | N.R.Raghunanthan | Tamil | | |
| 2021 | 'Samayapurathale' | | Godson Vardha | Tamil | Godson Vardha | |
| 2021 | 'Harane' | | Godson Vardha | Tamil | Godson Vardha | |
| 2021 | 'Un Vizhigalai' | | Dhivakar Satish | Tamil | Ratsun | |
| 2021 | 'Doctorate Kadhal' | Single | Rashaanth Arwin | Tamil | Ajay Krishna | |
| 2021 | 'Kadhalai Dhinamum Thedudhey' | | Sharran Surya | Tamil | | |
| 2021 | 'U & Me' | | Godson Rudolph | Tamil | | |
| 2021 | 'Kadhal Meera' | | Ashwath | Tamil | MK Balaji | |
| 2021 | 'Ennaiye Uyarthi' | | Dr. Jijo C John | Tamil | | |
| 2021 | 'Nee Thedum Bhodhu' | | Srikanth Deva | Tamil | Srikanth Deva | |
| 2022 | 'Thaaragaiye - The Spark of Love | Meghna | Shameshan Mani Maran | Tamil | JC Joe | |
| 2022 | 'Nam Desamay' | | BK Kannagi | Tamil | Anuradha Sriram, Sam Vishal, Vikram Sai Prasad, Yogi Sekar, BK Kannagi | |
| 2022 | 'Theenda Thiruda' | | Manimaran | Tamil | | |
| 2022 | 'Paaththaane Oru Paarvai' | | Madharaasi Mic | Tamil | | |
| 2022 | 'Enakkaka Oru Idhayam' | | M. A. Jaikumar | Tamil | | |
| 2022 | 'Adhimalai Swamimalai' | | Kanmani Raja | Tamil | | |
| 2022 | 'Yasagane' | | Sagishna Xavier | Tamil | Haricharan | |
| 2022 | 'Yaar Aval' | | A. K. Sasidaran | Tamil | | |
| 2022 | 'Yaen Marandhaai' | Suzhal: The Vortex | Sam C. S. | Tamil | | |
| 2022 | 'Mayangiyatho Enthan Manamey' | Enna Solla Pogirai | Dr. Jijo C John | Tamil | | |
| 2022 | 'Ma Poo Magizham Poo' | | Sharran Surya | Tamil | | |
| 2022 | 'Vaanam Pozhiya' | Insta - 1 Min Music | D Sathyaprakash | Tamil | | |
| 2022 | ’Athisayangal Seibavare’ | Vincy Productions | Vinny Alegro | Tamil | | |
| 2022 | 'Thottachinungi Megam' | | Jaya K Doss | Tamil | | |
| 2022 | 'Mamoi' | | Jen Martin | Tamil | Jen Martin | |
| 2022 | 'Ora Siricha' | Naam 2 | Stephen Zechariah | | M.M. Manasi | |
| 2022 | 'Kannoram' | Naam 2 | Stephen Zechariah | | Deri Lorus | |
| 2023 | 'Mazhai Thuligal' | | Kaushik Ganesan | Tamil | Adithya RK | |
| 2024 | Kadhal Kadamaye | | GS | Tamil | GS | |
| 2026 | 'Imaye' | Must Date the Playboy (TV series) | Shabir Sulthan | Tamil | Shabir Sulthan, Roshan Jamrock | |
