= Roshini (singer) =

Indian playback singer

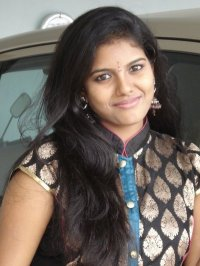

Background information
- Genres: Playback singing
- Occupations: Playback singer, performer
- Instrument: Vocalist

Roshini is an Indian playback singer who originally hails from Tamil Nadu. She has sung songs in Tamil and Telugu languages. She contested in the seventh season of Tamil reality show Super Singer in Vijay TV.

== Guinness Record ==
Roshini along with her sister Anita (a.k.a. Singer Shalini JKA) performed the feat of 'singing non-stop for 37 hours', which fetched them a place in the Guinness Book of World Records.

== Songs ==
Song title	Film	Music director	Language
"Kanaguruvi"	Aahaa Enna Porutham	Vidyasagar	Tamil
"Hossanam"	Veera	S. Thaman	Telugu
"Pottu Thakku"	Kuthu	Srikanth Deva	Tamil
"Alaudinu"	Chanakya	Srikanth Deva	Tamil
"Namma Kaatulla Mazhai Peiyuthu"	Pattiyal	Yuvan Shankar Raja	Tamil
"En Jannal Vandha"	Theeratha Vilayattu Pillai	Yuvan Shankar Raja	Tamil
"Alwa Ponnu"	Jambhavan	Bharadwaj	Tamil
"Mayiley Mayiley"	Aalwar	Srikanth Deva	Tamil
"Pollachi Ponnu"	Thiru Ranga	Srikanth Deva	Tamil
"Nee Rasthaali"	Parattai Engira Azhagu Sundaram	Gurukiran	Tamil
"Karuppaana Kaiyala"	Thaamirabharani	Yuvan Shankar Raja	Tamil
"Kadavulaa Illai Kalla"	Periyar	Vidyasagar	Tamil
"Oh Baby"	Yaaradi Nee Mohini	Yuvan Shankar Raja	Tamil
"Choti Choti Baatein"	Maharshi	Devi Sri Prasad	Telugu
"Machakkaran"	Machakaaran	Yuvan Shankar Raja	Tamil
"Ullara Poondhu"	Baana Kaathadi	Yuvan Shankar Raja	Tamil
"Naa Yedana Oka"	Kurrolloi Kurrollu	Yuvan Shankar Raja	Telugu (Dubbed)
"Unnaadi Poola Pakka"	Kurrolloi Kurrollu	Yuvan Shankar Raja	Telugu (Dubbed)
"Nee Kallalo"	Namo Venkatesa	Devi Sri Prasad	Telugu
"Asalemayyinde"	Sadhyam	Chinni Charan	Telugu
"Nalupaina Kannaiah"	Bharani	Yuvan Shankar Raja	Telugu (Dubbed)
"Vaanam Thoorammalae (Afreen Afreen)"	Sketch	S. Thaman	Tamil
"Inkoka"	Bhargava	Srikanth Deva	Telugu (Dubbed)
"Kabul"	Neelo Naalo	PB. Balaji	Telugu (Dubbed)
"Ulala Ulala"	Yugantham	Dhina	Telugu (Dubbed)
"Okkara"	February 14	Dhina	Telugu (Dubbed)
"Padahare"	Asthram	S. A. Rajkumar	Telugu
"Yelo Yelo Illalai"	Gorintaku	S. A. Rajkumar	Telugu
"Alaka Vanchi Kottu"	Yugantham	Dhina	Telugu (Dubbed)
"I Know You Love Me"	Ayudha Porattam	Nandhan Raj	Tamil
"Aagayam"	Aruvam	S. Thaman	Tamil
"Malaruthu Puthu Naale"	Petromax	Ghibran	Tamil
"Yendi Raasathi"	Ispade Rajavum Idhaya Raniyum	Sam C. S.	Tamil
"Na Jilla Kedi"	Jackpot	Vishal Chandrashekhar	Tamil
"Mangalyam"	Eeswaran	S. Thaman	Tamil
"Tum Tum"	Enemy	S. Thaman	Tamil
"Sandaaliye"	Yaanai	G. V. Prakash Kumar	Tamil
"Thai Thai" (Rasavathi Fusion)	Rasavathi	S. Thaman	Tamil
