= Top Cooku Dupe Cooku season 2 =

Top Cooku Dupe Cooku
- Season 2
- Promotional poster for season 2, featuring the judges, and dupe cooks
- Starring: see below
- Hosted by: VJ Rakesh; Sivaangi Krishnakumar
- Judges: Venkatesh Bhat; Chef Rammohan; Mentors: Chef Adrian; Chef Cheruba; Chef Sai
- No. of contestants: 9
- No. of episodes: 35

Release
- Original network: Sun TV; Sun NXT
- Original release: 17 August – 14 December 2025

Season chronology
- ← Previous; Season 1

Top Cooku Dupe Cooku season 2 is the second season of the Tamil reality comedy cooking TV show Top Cooku Dupe Cooku. The season premiered on 17 August 2025 on Sun TV and digitally on Sun NXT. This season is judged by Chef Venkatesh Bhat and Chef Rammohan. This season is hosted by VJ Rakesh and Sivaangi Krishnakumar.

This season was ended at 14th December 2025 with 35 Episodes. The Title Winner is Besant Ravi while Preetha as the runner up of the show.

== Production ==
The show is produced by Media Masons and broadcast by Sun TV Network. A pre-recorded episode airs every Saturday and Sunday at 2pm IST on Sun TV. It is available for free streaming in the OTT platform Sun NXT and will be made available on YouTube as well.

== Participants status ==
| S.No | Top Cooku's | Week entered | Week exited | Status |
|---|---|---|---|---|
| 1 | Besant Ravi | Week 1 | Week 18 | Winner |
| 2 | Preetha | Week 1 | Week 18 | 1st runner-up |
| 3 | Delna Davis | Week 1 | Week 18 | 2nd runner-up |
| 4 | Kiran | Week 1 | Week 18 | 3rd runner-up |
| 4 | Kiran | Week 1 | Week 7 | Eliminated |
| 5 | Vaahesan Rasaiya | Week 1 | Week 18 | 4th runner-up unable to attend: still participated in Sri Lanka |
| 6 | Shivani Narayanan | Week 1 | Week 14 | Evicted |
| 7 | Srinivasan (TSR) | Week 1 | Week 12 | Eliminated |
| 8 | Priyanka | Week 1 | Week 10 | Eliminated |
| 9 | Robo Shankar | Week 1 | Week 4 | Eliminated |

== Participants ==
Alphabetical order of initial cooks name followed by later joined cooks:

1. Besant Ravi, an actor and stunt choreographer who has played antagonistic supporting roles in Tamil, Hindi and several other Indian language films.
2. Delna Davis, a television actress known for works in Malayalam and Tamil film and television industries. She had roles in You Too Brutus (2015), Happy Wedding (2016) and Kurangu Bommai (2017).
3. Kiran Rathod, a content creator and actress known for her roles in films such as Gemini (2002), Anbe Sivam (2003) and Winner (2003).
4. Preetha, an actress best known for appearing in the mini series Kadhaipoma.
5. Priyanka, a television actress known for roles in many serials.
6. Robo Shankar, a standup comedian and actor who has appeared in character roles in Tamil films. He made his breakthrough with STAR Vijay's Kalakkapovathu Yaaru, performing standup comedy.
7. Shivani Narayanan, an actress who mainly appears in the Tamil films and television industry. she was a contestant on the reality show Bigg Boss 4.
8. TSR Srinivasan, a comedian and actor known for his comedy roles in films such as Sethupathi (2016) and Annapoorani: The Goddess of Food (2023) and his villainous role in Ayali (2023).
9. Vaaheesan Rasaiya, a singer who is Sri Lankan born known for his songs such as "Kanaga", "Porkodi", "Oh Rasikkum Seemanae" and "Velundu".

== Dupe Cooku's ==
Dupe cooks names:

1. Adhirchi Arun
2. Dheena
3. Meenakshi Raveendran
4. Monisha Blessy
5. VJ Nikki
6. Adithya Kathir
7. Bharath
8. Lakshmi Patti
9. Kamalesh Jagan
10. GP Muthu
11. Mukund
12. Manish
13. Rapper Vijay

== Mentor chef teams ==
| Mentor chef | Top Cooku's | | |
|---|---|---|---|
| Chef Adrian | Delna | Kiran | Robo |
| Chef Cheruba | Preetha | Priyanka | Vaaheesan |
| Chef Sai | Ravi | Shivani | TSR |

== Pairings ==
| Cooks | Week 1 | Week 2 | Week 3 | Week 4 | Week 5 | Week 6 | Week 7 | Week 8 | Week 9 | Week 10 | Week 11 | Week 12 | Week 13 | Week 14 | Week 15 | Week 16 | Week 17 | Week 18 |
|---|---|---|---|---|---|---|---|---|---|---|---|---|---|---|---|---|---|---|
| Besant Ravi | Bharath | Kathir | Monisha | Kamalesh | Arun | Meenakshi | Lakshmi Patti & Mukund | Kamalesh | Kamalesh | Kathir | Manish | Kathir | Bharath | Nikki | 1st Finalist | 1st Finalist | Lakshmi Patti | Dheena Winner |
| Preetha | Lakshmi Patti & GP Muthu | GP Muthu | Dheena. | Arun | Bharath | Dheena | Dheena | Monisha | Nikki | Monisha | Nikki | Bharath | Kamalesh | Monisha | Arun | 3rd Finalist | Bharath | Bharath & Kamalesh 1st Runner-up |
| Delna | Arun | | | Dheena | Nikki | Not participated | Kathir | Arun | Monisha | Dheena | Kamalesh | Arun | Not participated | Dheena | 2nd Finalist | 2nd Finalist | Meenakshi | Arun & Meenakshi 2nd Runner-up |
| Kiran | Nikki | Monisha | Not participated | Kathir | Meenakshi | Kathir | Arun | ELIMINATED | | | | | | | | Arun | Nikki & Kamalesh 5th Finalist | Nikki 3rd Runner-up |
| Vaaheesan | Monisha | Nikki | Kathir | Challenger Task Winner | Monisha | Monisha | Monisha | Nikki | Kathir | Nikki | Bharath | Monisha | Rakesh | Bharath | Monisha | 4th Finalist | Arun | Monisha 4th Runner-up |
| Shivani | Kathir | Kamalesh | Nikki | Mukund | GP Muthu | Arun | Challenger Task Winner | Dheena | Arun | Meenakshi | Monisha | Nikki | Monisha | Arun | Ejected | | | |
| TSR | Dheena | Meenakshi | GP Muthu | | Lakshmi Patti | Nikki | Nikki | Meenakshi | Bharath | Arun | Kathir | Dheena | Eliminated | | | Nikki | Eliminated | |
| Priyanka | Meenakshi | Bharath | Meenakshi | Bharath & Lakshmi Patti | Kathir | GP Muthu | Meenakshi | Bharath | Meenakshi | Eliminated | | | | | | Monisha | Eliminated | |
| Robo Shankar | Kamalesh | Lakshmi Patti & Dheena | Kamalesh | Nikki | Eliminated | | | | | | | | | | | | | |

== Weekly summary ==
| Episodes | Week 1 | Week 2 | | Week 3 | | Week 4 | | Week 5 | Week 6 | Week 7 | Week 8 | Week 9 | Week 10 | Week 11 | Week 12 | Week 13 | Week 14 | Week 15 |
| Episodes | Grand Premiere | 2 | 3 | 4 | 5 | 6 | 7 | Week 5 | Week 6 | Week 7 | Week 8 | Week 9 | Week 10 | Week 11 | Week 12 | Week 13 | Week 14 | Grand Finale |
|---|---|---|---|---|---|---|---|---|---|---|---|---|---|---|---|---|---|---|
| Recipes | Any Favourite Dish | Virudhunagar Poricha Parotta | Tamil Nadu, Kerala, Andhra Pradesh Dishes | Chef Venkatesh Bhatt Milagu Vadai | Traditional Tamil Dishes | Cut Vegetables | Fruit Dessert | Samosa Challenge | Navathaniyam Dish Challenge | Jalebi Challenge | | | | | | | | |
| Top cook | Robo | Delna | | Vaaheesan | | Besant | | Preetha | Shivani | Shivani | | | | | | | | |
| Golden Table Winner | No Winner | Shivani | | Srinivasan | | Preetha | | Priyanka | | Shivani | | | | | | | | |
| Challenger Task Winner | No Winner | | | Vaaheesan | | No Winner | | | | | | | | | | | | |
| Besant | Joined Sai's Team | – | | | | | Top Cook | Golden Table Winner | | | | | | | | | | |
| Delna | Joined Adrian's Team | – | Top Cook | – | | | Danger Zone | Absent | | | | | | | | | | |
| Preetha | Joined Cheruba's Team | – | | | | Golden Table Winner | Danger Zone | Top Cook | | | | | | | | | | |
| Shivani | Joined Sai's Team | Golden Table Winner | – | | | | Danger Zone | Challenger Task Winner | Top Cook | Golden Table Winner | | | | | | | | |
| Vaaheesan | Joined Cheruba's Team | – | | | Challenger Task Winner | Exempt | | | | | | | | | | | | |
| Vaaheesan | Joined Cheruba's Team | – | | | Top Cook | Exempt | | | | | | | | | | | | |
| Srinivasan | Joined Sai's Team | – | | Golden Table Winner | – | | Danger Zone | Top Cook | Eliminated (Week 12) | | | | | | | | | |
| Priyanka | Joined Cheruba's Team | – | | | | | Danger Zone | Golden Table Winner | Eliminated (Week 9) | | | | | | | | | |
| Kiran | Joined Adrian's Team | – | | Absent | | – | Danger Zone | Eliminated (Week 7) | | | | | | | | | | |
| Robo | Joined Adrian's Team | – | | | | – | Danger Zone | Eliminated (Week 4) | | | | | | | | | | |
| Robo | Top Cook | – | | | | – | Danger Zone | Eliminated (Week 4) | | | | | | | | | | |
| Notes | | | | 1 | | | | | | | | | | | | | | |
| Against Elimination Round | No Elimination Round | | | | | Delna; Kiran; Preetha; Priyanka; Robo; Shivani; Srinivasan | | | | | | | | | | | | |
| Eliminated | No Elimination | | | | | Robo | | | Kiran | | | | | | | | | |
| References | | | | | | | | | | | | | | | | | | |

indicates the winner.
indicates the first runner up.
indicates the second runner up.
indicates the third runner up.
indicates the fourth runner up.
indicates that contestant is absent for that week and did not participate.
indicates that contestant is eliminated.

=== Summary notes ===
- ^1: Kiran was absent in Week 3 of the show, hence she did not appear.
- ^2 : Delna was absent in Week 6 and Week 13 of the show, hence she did not appear.
- ^3 : Shivani was absent in Week 15 of the show, hence she was eliminated

== Guest appearances ==
Week(s)
Guest(s)
Notes
Week 3
Mime Gopi
To introduce challenger week task.
Week 5
Premji Amaren
To introduce challenger week task.
Week 7
Anthony Daasan
To introduce challenger week task.
Week 11
Np (Narendra prasath )
Sivaangi Krishnakumar
To introduce challenger week task.
Week 11
Binni Krishnakumar
To judge and support the challenger week task.
Week 15
Sujatha Sivakumar

Chaitra Reddy Subash Selvam

To make the competition difficult for semi-final contestants
