= Binni Krishnakumar =

- Born: 10 June 1974 (age 52); Thodupuzha, Kerala, India
- Occupation: Singer
- Years active: 1987 – Present
- Spouse: K. Krishnakumar
- Children: Sivaangi
- Honours: Kalaimamani from Government of Tamil Nadu; Kerala Sangeetha Nataka Akademi Award from Government of Kerala
- Musical career
- Genres: Carnatic; Indian classical music; Playback singing; Filmi; Bharatanatyam
- Instruments: Vocals, Veena

Binni Krishnakumar (born 10 June 1974) is an Indian Carnatic musician, playback singer, Bharatanatyam dancer and a television personality. Regarded as a prominent vocalist, she has performed at all major sabhas (music organisations) in India and has released over 100 classical albums. Besides, she has performed as a Bharatanatyam dancer across various arenas. She is the recipient of Kerala Sangeetha Nataka Akademi Award (2012) and Kalaimamani award (2020) presented by the Government of Tamil Nadu

Binni is also known for her work as a playback singer in Tamil and Malayalam cinema, particularly for her song, "Raa Raa" composed by Vidyasagar for the 2005 film Chandramukhi for which she won the Filmfare Award for Best Female Playback Singer. She has featured in several television reality shows, both as a contestant and judge, such as Top Cooku Dupe Cooku, Cooku with Comali, Samayal Samayal with Venkatesh Bhat, Top Singer and Super Singer.

== Early life and background ==
Binny was born to K. N. Ramachandran Nair and Santha Ramachandran Nair in Thodupuzha, Kerala. She comes from a distinguished musical lineage and began learning Carnatic Music (Vocal) at the age of seven under Vidwan Thiruvizha Surendran. She has five siblings who are all pursuing their careers as music teachers. She received the National Talent Scholarship and came under the tutelage of Thamarakkad Govindan Namboothiri. She pursued her B.A and M.A degrees in Music from the University of Kerala. During her post graduation, she was mentored by violinist B. Sasikumar and Prof. Neyyattinkara Mohanachandran at Thiruvananthapuram.

Binny's earliest recognition came in 1989 when she bagged the "Kalaathilakam" title at the Kerala State Youth Festival Committee. She further pursued M. Phil in music at Kamaraj University, Madurai and secured first grade. Binni is a B-High grade artist at the All India Radio and performs regularly during cultural and Government organized ceremonies.

== Career ==
=== Carnatic music ===
Binny started her public concerts while she was pursuing her graduation at the Youth festivals organized by the university. She was conferred upon many honors and prizes post her performances. Post her marriage to Krishnakumar in 1999, the couple have been performing extensively across India and internationally, with concerts in the United States, Canada, the United Kingdom, Australia, and Singapore, among other countries. The duo have performed together in more than 150 shows across various countries and consider themselves as disciples of eminent vocalist M. Balamuralikrishna.

=== Playback singing ===
Binny's career as a playback singer began in 2004 with the song "Yamunayum" composed by M. Jayachandran for the Malayalam film Amrutham. However, she reached her popularity when Vidyasagar invited her to record "Raa Raa Sarasaku Raa Raa" for the film Chandramukhi (2005). The song was an immediate success and earned her the Filmfare Award for Best Female Playback Singer.

She continued to collaborate with M. Jayachandran, Ilaiyaraaja, Ouseppachan and Vidyasagar on several popular songs in films such as Boyy Friennd (2005), SMS (2008), Thozhi (2009), Thambi Vettothi Sundaram (2011) and Sangharshana (2011). She has also recorded songs for films in other South Indian languages, including Kannada and Telugu.

== Personal life ==
Binny is married to K. Krishnakumar who is a classical vocalist and a composer. They have two children and her daughter Sivaangi Krishnakumar is an actress and playback singer. Binny has mentored as a musical Guru for younger playback singers, namely Swetha Mohan, Gopika Poornima and Kalyani Nair.

== Discography ==
=== Films ===
Year	Film	Language	Song title	Music director	Co-singer
2004	Amrutham	Malayalam	"Yamunayum"	M. Jayachandran	
2005	Chandramukhi	Tamil	"Ra Ra Sarasaku"	Vidyasagar	Tippu
2005	Bus Conductor	Malayalam	"Vaathaapi"	M. Jayachandran	
2005	Boyy Friennd	Malayalam	"Ramzan Nilaavotha"	M. Jayachandran	K. J. Yesudas
2005	Lokanathan IAS	Malayalam	"Manjaadikombilinnoru"	M. Jayachandran	K. K. Nishad
2005	Arputha Theevu (D)	Tamil	"Oridatthil"	M. Jayachandran	Tippu
2005	Aanai	Tamil	"Azhagiya Darisanam"	D. Imman	Madhu Balakrishnan
2006	Imsai Arasan 23rd Pulikecei	Tamil	"Aah Aadivaa"	Sabesh-Murali	Manikka Vinayagam, Saindhavi, Vadivelu, Kovai Kamala
2007	Thottal Poo Malarum	Tamil	"Ennai Pidichha"	Yuvan Shankar Raja	Haricharan
2008	Kovalam (Theeram)	Malayalam	"Konchum Thinkale"	Natesh Shankar	M. G. Sreekumar
2008	SMS	Malayalam	"Innale Muttathu Kinnaram"	Ilaiyaraaja	Vineeth Sreenivasan, Rakesh Brahmanandam, Vidhu Prathap
2008	Nadigai	Tamil	"Roja Malare"	Babu Ganesh	Mary George, Rajakumar
2008	Mahesh, Saranya Matrum Palar	Tamil	"Thajam Thajam"	Vidyasagar	
2009	Thozhi	Tamil	"Isaiyin Meedhuthan"	R. Shankar	Madhu Balakrishnan
2010	Magizhchi	Tamil	"Kanne Kaniyurangu"	Vidyasagar	Madhu Balakrishnan
2010	Nagavalli	Tamil	"Ra Ra 2.0"	Guru Kiran	Tippu, Ranjith
2011	Sangharshana (D)	Telugu	"Yevvaro Yevarithado"	Sundar C. Babu	
2011	Kal Manja	Kannada	"Indhe Kano"	Emil Mohammed	
2011	Thambi Vettothi Sundaram	Tamil	"Netru Illai Illai"	Vidyasagar	Madhu Balakrishnan
2015	Ennum Eppozhum	Malayalam	"Dhithiki Dhithiki"	Vidyasagar	
2016	Mazhaneer Thullikal	Malayalam	"Aaro Mooliya"	Ouseppachan	
2016	Jalam	Malayalam	"Pakal Paathichaari"	Ouseppachan	

=== Albums ===
Year	Album title	Language	Song title
2005	Velli Malargal	Tamil	"En Sontham"
2007	Ramayanam Kadhai Pattu	Tamil	Various songs
2008	Thandayum Thayum	Tamil	"Ezhisai Ragam"
2009	Enakkoru Aasai	Tamil	"Nee Mattum Vendum"
2010	Varumo Nee	Malayalam	"Muraleeganam"
2011	Maaberum Narseithi	Tamil	"Vaanum Mannum"
2011	Thaayaga Vaa	Tamil	"Aadhi Muthalva"
2012	Ranga Baro	Kannada	Various songs
2012	Nama Sravana Sukham	Malayalam	"Bhaktajana Vatsale"
2015	Ananda Mazhai	Tamil	"Azhagana Veenai"
2018	Avarkkoppam	Malayalam	"Engottennillathe"
2022	Balamurali Pancharathnam	Telugu	Various songs

=== Television ===
Binny has appeared as a guest judge in various reality TV music talent shows such as Gandharva sangeetham,Super Singer, Top Singer, Jaya Super Singer South India, Start Music, Super Singer Junior, Musical wife, often aired on Tamil and Malayalam TV channels. She has also appeared as a contestant and guest in several other shows such as Naanum Rowdy Dhaan, Top Cooku Dupe Cooku, Cooku with Comali, Samayal Samayal with Venkatesh Bhat.

Serial name	Music director	Channel(s)
Lakshmi	Dhina	Sun TV

== Titles, awards and other recognition ==
Binny is a "Top Rank" graded artist of Akashvani and All India Radio, Chennai. She won the Kalaimamani award from the Government of Tamil Nadu in 2020, along with her husband Krishnakumar. During her career, She has been bestowed with numerous other titles and won numerous other awards and prizes.

Year	Honour	Honouring bestowed or presented by	Ref
1989	Kalathilakam	Kerala State Youth Festival Committee	
1992 & 1994	First Prize in music	Kerala University Youth Festivals	
2000	The Junior Fellowship	Government of India (Cultural Department)	
2012	Kerala Sangeetha Nataka Akademi Award	Government of Kerala	
2020	Kalaimamani	Government of Tamil Nadu	
