= Top Cooku Dupe Cooku season 1 =

Top Cooku Dupe Cooku
- Season 1
- Promotional poster for season 1, featuring the judge and dupe cooks
- Starring: see below
- Hosted by: VJ Rakesh
- Judges: Venkatesh Bhat; Chef Rammohan; Binny Krishnakumar; Mentors: Chef Cheruba; Chef Sai; Chef Saravanan; Chef Yuvasri
- No. of contestants: 11
- Winners: Sujatha Sivakumar; Narendra Prasath
- Runners-up: FEFSI Vijayan (1st); Chaitra Reddy(2nd)
- No. of episodes: 20

Release
- Original network: Sun TV; Sun NXT
- Original release: 19 May – 29 September 2024

Season chronology
- Next → Season 2

Top Cooku Dupe Cooku is the first season of the Tamil reality comedy cooking TV show Top Cooku Dupe Cooku. The season premiered on 19 May 2024 on Sun TV and digitally on Sun NXT. This season is produced and judged by Chef Venkatesh Bhat, along with Judge Chef Rammohan supported by Binny Krishnakumar and hosted by Rakesh.

The season began with Aishwarya Dutta, Chaitra Reddy, Narendra Prasath, Sai Dheena, Shali Nivekas, Singampuli, Sonia Agarwal, Sujatha Sivakumar and FEFSI Vijayan as the initial contestants. They were later joined by Maneesha Mahesh and Subash Selvam as wild card entries. In the end Narendra, Vijayan, Chaitra, Sujatha, Subash and Maneesha had qualified for the finals.

In the Grand Finale Sujatha Sivakumar and Narendra Prasath both tied as the title winners of Top Cooku Dupe Cooku season 1 while, FEFSI Vijayan and Chaitra Reddy finished as 1st and 2nd runners-up respectively.The title winners Narendra and Sujatha were awarded with a cash prize of ₹20 lakh (US$21,000).

== Production ==
The show is produced by Media Masons and broadcast by Sun TV Network. A pre-recorded episode airs every Sunday at 12:30 UTC+5:30 and is re-telecasted on the following Saturday at 09:30 UTC+5:30 both on Sun TV and Shakthi TV. It is available for free streaming in the OTT platform Sun NXT and will be made available on YouTube as well.

== Participants ==
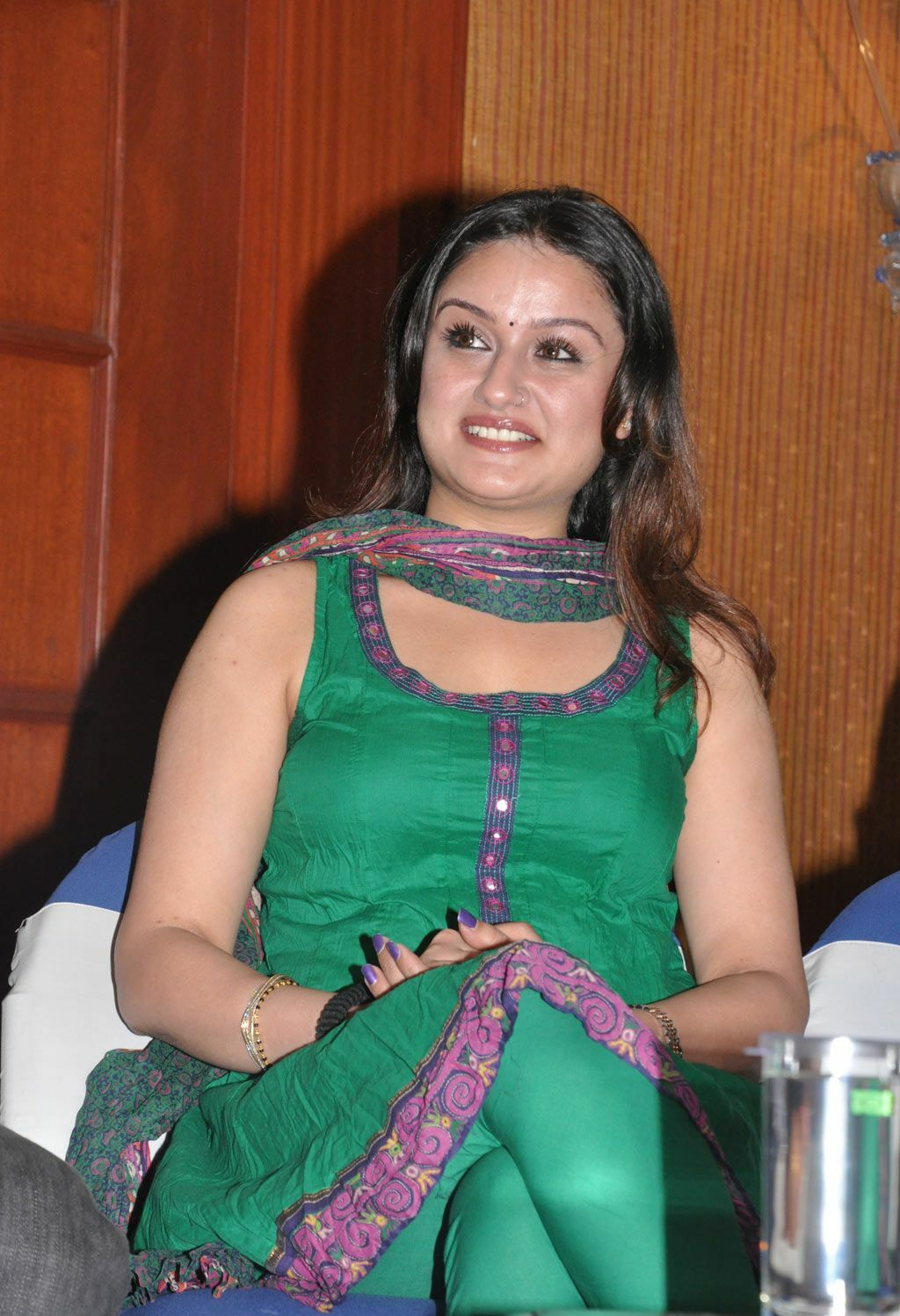
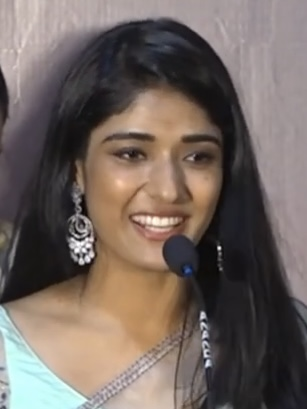
Sonia Agarwal (L) was the first Top Cooku to be eliminated, followed by Shali Nivekas (R).

Alphabetical order of initial cooks name followed by later joined cooks:

1. Aishwarya Dutta, an actress who appeared in the films Tamizhuku En Ondrai Azhuthavum (2015) and Paayum Puli (2015). She is also the runner-up of the reality television show Bigg Boss season 2.
2. Chaitra Reddy, a television actress who mainly works in the Kannada and Tamil languages. She is mainly known for her titular role of Kayal in the Kayal.
3. Narendra Prasath (NP), a Tamil actor and comedian.
4. Sai Dheena, an actor. He played the antagonist in Attu (2017), Thimiru Pudichavan (2018) and Vaandu (2019).
5. Shali Nivekas, a television actress. She is best known for her role, Naachiyar in the television series Sengalam.
6. Singampuli, an actor and director known for making films Red (2002) and Maayavi (2005).
7. Sonia Agarwal, an actress who works predominantly in Tamil cinema and a few Telugu, Malayalam and Kannada films. She is best known for her performances in films such as Kaadhal Kondein (2003), 7G Rainbow Colony (2004) and Pudhupettai (2006).
8. Sujatha Sivakumar, an actress, who rose to fame with her performance in Ameer's Paruthiveeran (2007), before appearing in several supporting roles as a mother in Tamil cinema.
9. FEFSI Vijayan, an action choreographer, stunt coordinator and actor who works in Telugu, Tamil, Malayalam and Hindi language films. He is the youngest stunt master in the Indian film industry at the age of 22.
10. Maneesha Mahesh, (Note: Joined as Wild card entry.) a television actress, who is best known for her roles in the television series Padatha Painkili and Singapennae.
11. Subash Selvam, an actor. He is known for his roles as Arjun in Thittam Irandu (2021) and Vetri in Hot Spot (2024).

=== Participant status ===
Chef Cheruba Team
Chef Sai Team
Chef Saravanan Team
Chef Yuvasri Team
Eliminated
Wildcard round
Finalist
2nd Runner-up
1st Runner-up
Winner

No.	Name	Entry episode	Episode exited	Rapid fire rounds won	Golden table challenges won	Top cook of the week	Nominations for elimination	Status
01	Sujatha	Episode 1	Episode 20	1	4	7	2	Winner
02	Narendra Prasath	Episode 1	Episode 20	3	2	5	1	Winner
03	Vijayan	Episode 1	Episode 20	—N/a	3	6	—N/a	1st Runner-up
04	Chaitra Reddy	Episode 1	Episode 20	2	5	3	—N/a	2nd Runner-up
05	Subash	Episode 12	Episode 20	—N/a		1	—N/a	Finalist
06	Maneesha	Episode 12	Episode 18	—N/a		1	1	Eliminated
06	Maneesha	Wildcard Episode 19	Episode 20	—N/a		1	1	Wildcard Finalist
07	Aishwarya	Episode 1	Episode 16	1	2	2	1	Eliminated
07	Aishwarya	Wildcard Episode 19		1	2	2	1	Eliminated
08	S Dheena	Episode 1	Episode 15	—N/a		1	1	Eliminated
08	S Dheena	Wildcard Episode 19		—N/a		1	1	Eliminated
09	Singampuli	Episode 1	Episode 10	2	1	—N/a	1	Eliminated
09	Singampuli	Wildcard Episode 19		2	1	—N/a	1	Eliminated
10	Shali	Episode 1	Episode 8	1	—N/a	1	2	Eliminated
10	Shali	Wildcard Episode 19		1	—N/a	1	2	Eliminated
11	Sonia	Episode 1	Episode 5	—N/a	1	—N/a	1	Eliminated
11	Sonia	Wildcard Episode 19		—N/a	1	—N/a	1	Eliminated

=== Chef teams ===
Chef	Top Cooku's			Ref.
Chef Cheruba	Shali	Sujatha	Vijayan	
Chef Sai	Aishwarya	Chaitra	Singampuli	
Chef Saravanan	S Dheena	Narendra	Sonia	
Chef Yuvasri	Maneesha	Subash	—N/a	

=== Dupe Cooku's ===
Alphabetical order of Dupe cooks names:

1. Adhirchi Arun
2. Bharat K Rajesh
3. Deepa Shankar
4. Dheena
5. GP Muthu
6. Kathir
7. Monisha Blessy
8. Mukund
9. Soundarya
10. Vijay

== Episodes ==
No. overall	No. in season	Title	Original release date	Duration
1	1	"Episode 1: The Grand Launch"	19 May 2024	73 minutes
The show was launched with the introduction of Host, Judges, Mentors, Top Cooku's, Dupe Cooku's and the show's format. As the first week it didn't contain any guest judge, elimination box and golden table. Aishwarya & Shali won the Rapid fire and chose Bharath & GP Muthu as their desired Dupe cooku's respectively. Aishwarya paired with Bharath finished as the Top cook of the week.
2	2	"Episode 2"	26 May 2024	71 minutes
Actor Vadivelu joined as a guest judge. No elimination box this week either. Chaitra & Singampuli won the Rapid fire and chose Soundarya & Dheena as their desired Dupe Cooku's respectively. Vijayan won the golden table challenge along with an extra Dupe Cooku. Vijayan paired with GP Muthu & Vijay finished as the Top cook of the week.
3	3	"Episode 3"	2 June 2024	73 minutes
Actor Vadivelu stayed as the guest judge for the first half and Chef Rammohan took over for the rest of the episode. Top Cookus' elimination box choice was no elimination. S Dheena was hospitalized during the Rapid fire but returned for the Main challenge. Singampuli won the Rapid fire for the second consecutive week and chose GP Muthu as his desired Dupe Cooku. Singampuli also won the golden table challenge. Sujatha paired with Mukund finished as the Top cook of the week.
4	4	"Episode 4"	9 June 2024	67 minutes
Chef Rammohan became a permanent judge. Top Cookus' elimination box choice was no elimination. Narendra won the Rapid fire and chose Arun as his desired Dupe Cooku while Sujatha won the golden table challenge. Shali paired with Monisha finished as the Top cook of the week.
5	5	"Episode 5: Elimination 1"	16 June 2024	67 minutes
Given last 2 weeks didn't have an elimination, this week was a compulsory elimination round. Narendra won the Rapid fire for the second consecutive week and chose Arun as his desired Dupe Cooku while Aishwarya won the golden table challenge. Narendra paired with Arun finished as the Top cook of the week. Shali paired with Mukund and Sonia paired with Kathir finished at the bottom places. As a result Shali and Sonia were nominated for elimination and Sonia was eliminated from the competition.
6	6	"Episode 6"	23 June 2024	67 minutes
Top Cookus' elimination box choice was no elimination. Chaitra won the Rapid fire for the second time and chose Arun as her desired Dupe Cooku while Aishwarya won the golden table challenge for the second consecutive week. Vijayan paired with Kathir finished as the Top cook of the week.
7	7	"Episode 7"	30 June 2024	70 minutes
Top Cookus' elimination box choice was no elimination. Narendra and Sujatha won the Rapid fire and chose Monisha and GP Muthu as their desired Dupe Cooku's respectively while Sujatha won the golden table challenge for the second time. Sai Dheena paired with Arun finished as the Top cook of the week.
8	8	"Episode 8: Elimination 2"	7 July 2024	68 minutes
Given last 2 weeks didn't have an elimination, this week was a compulsory elimination round. Narendra won the golden table challenge. Aishwarya paired with Monisha finished as the Top cook of the week for the second time. Shali paired with Dheena and Sujatha paired with Kathir finished at the bottom places. As a result Shali and Sujatha were nominated for elimination and Shali was eliminated from the competition.
9	9	"Episode 9: Celebration week"	14 July 2024	68 minutes
Seven actors from Sun TV serials – Alagappan, Nikitha Rajesh, Maneesha Mahesh, Gabriella Charlton, Ashwanth Karthi, Sruthi Raj, Alya Manasa were paired with each Top Cooku–Dupe Cooku pair for the episode. (Note: Seven actors from Sun TV serials were paired with each Top Cooku–Dupe Cooku pair for the episode 9: Celebration week.) As it's a celebration week it did not contain elimination. Chaitra won the golden table challenge for the second time. Sujatha paired with Deepa &Alya and Vijayan paired with Kathir & Nikitha finished as the Top cooks of the week for the second and third times respectively.
10	10	"Episode 10: Elimination 3"	21 July 2024	68 minutes
Top Cookus' elimination box choice was elimination. Sujatha won the golden table challenge for the third time. Sujatha paired with Bharath finished as the Top cook of the week for the third time. Singhampuli paired with Kathir and Narendra paired with GP Muthu finished at the bottom places. As a result Singhampuli and Narendra were nominated for elimination and Singhampuli was eliminated from the competition.
11	11	"Episode 11: Raayan Special"	28 July 2024	68 minutes
Kalidas Jayaram and Dushara Vijayan joined as the guests for this episode to promote their movie Raayan. (Note: Kalidas Jayaram and Dushara Vijayan joined as the guests for episode 11 to promote their movie Raayan.) Top Cookus' elimination box choice was no elimination. Chaitra won the Golden table challenge. Chaitra paired with GP Muthu finished as the Top Cook of the week.
12	12	"Episode 12: Wildcard entry week"	4 August 2024	68 minutes
Maneesha Mahesh and Subash Selvam joined the competition as wildcard entries. As it's the wildcard entry week it did not contain elimination. Chaitra won the Golden table challenge for the consecutive second week. Chaitra paired with Kathir finished as the Top Cook of the week.
13	13	"Episode 13"	11 August 2024	68 minutes
Top Cookus' elimination box choice was no elimination. Chaitra won the Golden table challenge for the consecutive third week. Sujatha paired with GP Muthu finished as the Top Cook of the week.
14	14	"Episode 14: Friendship week"	18 August 2024	73 minutes
Each Top Cooku brought one of their friends such as Muthukaalai, Kiruthika, Sendrayan, Yashika, Vigneshkanth, Aswath, Santosh Pratap, Kalyani (Note: Each Top Cooku brought one of their friends for the episode 14: Friendship week.) and they were paired with their respective Top Cooku–Dupe Cooku pair. As it's a celebration week it did not contain elimination. Vijayan won the golden table challenge for the second time. Vijayan paired with Arun & Muthukaalai and NP paired with Dheena & Vigneshkanth finished as the Top cooks of the week for the fourth and second times respectively.
15	15	"Episode 15: Elimination 4"	25 August 2024	70 minutes
The show enters the final stage from this episode onwards. (Note: In the final stage of the show all episodes would be elimination episodes leading upto the ticket to Finale round.) Chef Koushik Shankar joined as the judge chef. (Note: Chef Koushik joined as the Judge Chef for episodes 15 & 16 at Chef Rammohan's position.) Vijayan won the golden table challenge for the third time. Vijayan paired with Vijay and Sujatha paired with Arun finished as the Top cooks of the week for the fifth time each. Sai Dheena paired with Dheena finished at the bottom place and as a result Sai Dheena was eliminated from the competition.
16	16	"Episode 16: Elimination 5"	1 September 2024	69 minutes
Chef Koushik Shankar stayed as the judge chef. Narendra won the golden table challenge for the second time. Narendra paired with GP Muthu finished as the Top cook of the week for the third time. Aishwarya paired with Mukund and Sujatha paired with Soundarya finished at the bottom places. As a result, Aishwarya and Sujatha were nominated for elimination and Aishwarya was eliminated from the competition.
17	17	"Episode 17: Ticket to Finale"	8 September 2024	76 minutes
Chef Rammohan returned as the judge chefs. Chaitra won the golden table challenge for the fifth time. Narendra paired with Deepa and Vijayan paired with Monisha finished as the Top cooks of the week for the 4th and 6th times respectively. Narendra and Vijayan were both awarded the Ticket to Finale which as a result made them the 1st and 2nd Finalists respectively.
18	18	"Episode 18: Semi-finals round"	15 September 2024	73 minutes
Dr. Palaniappan Manickam also known as Dr. Pal joined as a guest judge. Sujatha won the golden table challenge for the 4th time. Chaitra paired with Monisha, Sujatha paired with GP Muthu and Subash paired with Bharath finished as the Top cooks of the week for the 3rd, 6th and 1st time(s) respectively making them the 3rd, 4th and 5th Finalists respectively.
19	19	"Episode 19: Wildcard round"	22 September 2024	69 minutes
All the eliminated contestants returned in the Wildcard round to compete for the 6th spot in the Top Cooku Dupe Cooku – Grand Finale. Sonia won the golden table challenge for the 1st time. Maneesha paired with Monisha finished as the Top cook of the week for the 1st time making her the 6th Finalist.
20	20	"Episode 20: The Grand Finale"	29 September 2024	119 minutes
The finalists – Narendra, Vijayan, Chaitra, Sujatha, Subash & Maneesha competed in the Grand Finale round for the Top Cooku Dupe Cooku title. Sathish, Mime Gopi, Chachi and Ajay Raj joined as the guests for the finale to promote their movie Sattam En Kaiyil. (Note: Sathish, Mime Gopi, Chachi and Ajay Raj joined as the guests for the finale to promote their movie Sattam En Kaiyil.) Families of the Dupe Cooks joined them in the cooking challenges. Sonia Agarwal, Shali Nivekas, Alagappan, Ashwin Karthi, VJ Nikki, Shruthi Shanmugapriya, Vaishnavi Nayak and VJ Kalyani also joined as guests for the finale. The Grand Finale was composed of two rounds with the 1st one being worth 30 marks and the second one being worth 70 marks. The results were determined for each finalist based on the combination from the total marks obtained during the 1st and 2nd rounds respectively upon completion of which Chaitra Reddy paired with Monisha finished in 2nd Runner-up position, FEFSI Vijayan paired with Deepa finished in 1st Runner-up position and the two Top Cooks of the Grand Finale, Narendra Prasath paired with Arun & Mukund as well as Sujatha Sivakumar paired with Dheena & Bharath, both emerged as the Top Cooku Dupe Cooku Season 1 Title Winners.

== Competition history ==
=== Guests ===
Episodes	Guests	Ref.
1	—N/a	
2 & 3	Vadivelu	
3	Chef Rammohan	
4 – 8	—N/a	
9	Alagappan, Nikitha Rajesh, Maneesha Mahesh, Gabriella Charlton, Ashwin Karthi, Sruthi Raj, Alya Manasa	
10	—N/a	
11	Kalidas Jayaram, Dushara Vijayan	
12 & 13	—N/a	
14	Muthukaalai, Kiruthika, Sendrayan, Yashika Aannand, RJ Vigneshkanth, Ashwath, Santhosh Prathap, VJ Kalyani	
15 & 16	Chef Koushik Shankar	
17	—N/a	
18	Dr. Palaniappan Manickam	
19	—N/a	
20	Sathish, Mime Gopi, Chachi, Ajay Raj	
20	Families of the Dupe Cooks	
20	Sonia Agarwal, Shali Nivekas, Alagappan, Ashwin Karthi, VJ Nikki, Shruthi Shanmugapriya, Vaishnavi Nayak, VJ Kalyani	

=== Elimination box selection ===
Episode	Elimination box		Result
Episode	Yes	No	Result
1	The Grand Launch		
2	—N/a		
3		✓	No elimination
4		✓	No elimination
5	—N/a		Elimination round
6		✓	No elimination
7		✓	No elimination
8	—N/a		Elimination round
9	—N/a		
10	✓		Elimination round

Episode	Elimination box		Result
Episode	Yes	No	Result
11		✓	No elimination
12	Wildcard entry		
13		✓	No elimination
14	—N/a		
15	—N/a		Elimination round
16	—N/a		Elimination round
17	Ticket to Finale		
18	Semi-finals round		
19	Wildcard round		
20	The Grand Finale		

=== Pairings ===
Chef Cheruba team
Chef Sai team
Chef Saravanan team
Chef Yuvasri team
# Rapid fire winner
→ Golden table challenge winner
† Top cook of the week
↓ Nominated for elimination
Eliminated
Wildcard round
Finalist
2nd Runner-up
1st Runner-up
Winner

Cooks	1	2	3	4	5	6	7	8	9	10
Narendra Prasath (NP)	Soundarya	Kathir	Vijay	Arun #	Arun #†	Bharath	Monisha #	Arun →	Arun & Maneesha	GP Muthu ↓
Sujatha Sivakumar	Kathir	Arun	Mukund †	Dheena →	Deepa	Monisha	GP Muthu #→	Kathir ↓	Deepa & Alya †	Bharath →†
FEFSI Vijayan	Deepa	GP Muthu & Vijay →†	Dheena	Soundarya	Monisha	Kathir †	Bharath	GP Muthu	Kathir & Nikitha †	Arun
Chaitra Reddy	Vijay	Soundarya #	Soundarya	Deepa	Dheena	Arun #	Deepa	Mukund	Soundarya & Ashwanth →	Vijay
Aishwarya Dutta	Bharath #†	Monisha	Kathir	Vijay	Vijay →	GP Muthu →	Kathir	Monisha †	Dheena & Alagappan	Deepa
Sai Dheena	Monisha	Bharath	Deepa	GP Muthu		Dheena	Arun †	Bharath	Monisha & Gabriella	Monisha
Singham Puli	Dheena	Dheena #	GP Muthu #→	Kathir	Soundarya	Deepa	Mukund	Deepa	Bharath & Sruthi	Kathir ↓
Shali Nivekas	GP Muthu #	Deepa	Arun	Monisha †	Mukund ↓	Soundarya	Dheena	Dheena ↓	Eliminated (Episode 8)	
Sonia Agarwal	Arun	Mukund	Monisha	Mukund	Kathir ↓	Eliminated (Episode 5)				

Cooks	11	12	13	14	15	16	17	18	19	20
Narendra Prasath (NP)	Arun	Mukund	Soundarya	Vigneshkanth & Dheena †	GP Muthu	GP Muthu →†	Deepa †	—N/a		Arun & Mukund †
Sujatha Sivakumar	Deepa	Monisha	GP Muthu †	Sendrayan & Deepa	Arun †	Soundarya ↓	Mukund	GP Muthu →†	—N/a	Dheena & Bharath †
FEFSI Vijayan	Monisha	Arun	Mukund	Muthukaalai & Arun →†	Vijay →†	Monisha	Monisha †	—N/a		Deepa
Chaitra Reddy	GP Muthu →†	Kathir →†	Dheena →	Aswath & Bharath	Deepa / Soundarya	Dheena	Arun →	Monisha †	—N/a	Monisha
Subash Selvam	—N/a	Vijay	Arun	Santosh Pratap & Mukund	Bharath / Monisha	Kathir		Bharath †	—N/a	GP Muthu & Vijay
Maneesha Mahesh	—N/a	GP Muthu	Deepa	Kalyani & GP Muthu	Kathir	Arun	Bharath	Arun ↓	Monisha †	Kathir & Soundarya
Aishwarya Dutta	Kathir	Bharath		Yashika & Soundarya	Mukund	Mukund ↓	Eliminated (Episode 16)		Dheena & Soundarya	Eliminated (Episode 19)
Sai Dheena	Dheena	Deepa	Kathir	Kiruthika & Kathir	Dheena ↓	Eliminated (Episode 15)			GP Muthu	Eliminated (Episode 19)
Singham Puli	Eliminated (Episode 10)								Bharath	Eliminated (Episode 19)
Shali Nivekas	Eliminated (Episode 8)								Deepa	Eliminated (Episode 19)
Sonia Agarwal	Eliminated (Episode 5)								Arun →	Eliminated (Episode 19)

=== Weekly overview ===
Chef Cheruba team
Chef Sai team
Chef Saravanan team
Chef Yuvasri team
Rapid fire winner
Golden table challenge winner
Cook left show due to injury sustained while cooking
Top cook of the week
Nominated for elimination
Eliminated
Re-entered the kitchen
Wildcard round
Finalist
2nd Runner-up
1st Runner-up
Winner

Episodes	1	2	3	4	5	6	7	8	9	10
Guests	—N/a	Vadivelu	Vadivelu & Chef Rammohan	—N/a					Alagappan, Nikitha Rajesh, Maneesha Mahesh, Gabriella Charlton, Ashwin Karthik, Sruthi Raj, Alya Manasa	—N/a
Rapid fire winner	Aishwarya & Shali	Chaitra & Singampuli	Singampuli	Narendra		Chaitra	Narendra & Sujatha	—N/a		
Golden table challenge winner	—N/a	Vijayan	Singampuli	Sujatha	Aishwarya		Sujatha	Narendra	Chaitra	Sujatha
Top cook	Aishwarya	Vijayan	Sujatha	Shali	Narendra	Vijayan	S Dheena	Aishwarya	Sujatha & Vijayan	Sujatha
Narendra	—N/a			Rapid fire winner		—N/a	Rapid fire winner	Golden table challenge winner	—N/a	Nominated for elimination
Narendra	—N/a			—N/a	Top cook	—N/a	Rapid fire winner	Golden table challenge winner	—N/a	Nominated for elimination
Sujatha	—N/a		Top cook	Golden table challenge winner	—N/a		Rapid fire winner	Nominated for elimination	Top cook	
Sujatha	—N/a		Top cook	Golden table challenge winner	—N/a		Golden table challenge winner	Nominated for elimination	—N/a	Golden table challenge winner
Vijayan	—N/a	Golden table challenge winner	—N/a			Top cook	—N/a		Top cook	—N/a
Vijayan	—N/a	Top cook	—N/a			Top cook	—N/a		Top cook	—N/a
Chaitra	—N/a	Rapid fire winner	—N/a			Rapid fire winner	—N/a		Golden table challenge winner	—N/a
Aishwarya	Rapid fire winner	—N/a			Golden table challenge winner		—N/a	Top cook	—N/a	
Aishwarya	Top cook	—N/a			Golden table challenge winner		—N/a	Top cook	—N/a	
S Dheena	—N/a		Hospitalized	—N/a			Top cook	—N/a		
S Dheena	—N/a		Re-entered in Main challenge	—N/a			Top cook	—N/a		
Singampuli	—N/a	Rapid fire winner		—N/a						Nominated for elimination
Singampuli	—N/a	—N/a	Golden table challenge winner	—N/a						Nominated for elimination
Shali	Rapid fire winner	—N/a		Top cook	Nominated for elimination	—N/a		Nominated for elimination	Eliminated (Episode 8)	
Sonia	—N/a				Nominated for elimination	Eliminated (Episode 5)				
Left show due to injury	—N/a		S Dheena	—N/a						
Entered	—N/a		S Dheena	—N/a						
Nominated for elimination	—N/a				Shali & Sonia	—N/a		Shali & Sujatha	—N/a	Singampuli & Narendra
Eliminated	—N/a				Sonia	—N/a		Shali	—N/a	Singampuli

Episodes	11	12	13	14	15	16	17	18	19	20
Guests	Kalidas Jayaram, Dushara Vijayan	—N/a		Muthukaalai, Kiruthika, Sendrayan, Yashika, Vigneshkanth, Aswath, Santosh Pratap, Kalyani	Chef Koushik Shankar		—N/a	Dr. Palaniappan Manickam	—N/a	Sathish, Mime Gopi, Chachi, Ajay Raj, Families of the Dupe Cooks, Alagappan, Ashwin Karthi, VJ Nikki, Shruthi Shanmugapriya, Vaishnavi Nayak, VJ Kalyani, Sonia Agarwal, Shali Nivekas
Rapid fire winner	—N/a									
Golden table challenge winner	Chaitra			Vijayan		Narendra	Chaitra	Sujatha	Sonia	—N/a
Top cook	Chaitra		Sujatha	Vijayan & Narendra	Vijayan & Sujatha	Narendra	Narendra & Vijayan	Chaitra, Sujatha & Subash	Maneesha	Narendra & Sujatha
Narendra	—N/a			Top Cook	—N/a	Golden table challenge winner	Top Cook	Advanced to Finale		Winner
Narendra	—N/a			Top Cook	—N/a	Top cook	Top Cook	Advanced to Finale		Winner
Sujatha	—N/a		Top Cook	—N/a	Top Cook	Nominated for elimination	—N/a	Golden table challenge winner	Advanced to Finale	Winner
Sujatha	—N/a		Top Cook	—N/a	Top Cook	Nominated for elimination	—N/a	Top Cook	Advanced to Finale	Winner
Vijayan	—N/a			Golden table challenge winner		—N/a	Top Cook	Advanced to Finale		1st Runner-up
Vijayan	—N/a			Top Cook		—N/a	Top Cook	Advanced to Finale		1st Runner-up
Chaitra	Golden table challenge winner			—N/a			Golden table challenge winner	Top Cook	Advanced to Finale	2nd Runner-up
Chaitra	Top cook		—N/a	—N/a			Golden table challenge winner	Top Cook	Advanced to Finale	2nd Runner-up
Subash	—N/a	Wildcard entry	—N/a					Top Cook	Advanced to Finale	Finalist
Maneesha	—N/a	Wildcard entry	—N/a					Nominated for elimination	Wildcard Round	Finalist
Maneesha	—N/a	Wildcard entry	—N/a					Eliminated (Episode 18)	Top Cook	Finalist
Maneesha	—N/a	Wildcard entry	—N/a					Eliminated (Episode 18)	Advanced to Finale	Finalist
Aishwarya	—N/a					Nominated for elimination	Eliminated (Episode 16)		Wildcard Round	Eliminated (Episode 19)
S Dheena	—N/a				Nominated for elimination	Eliminated (Episode 15)			Wildcard Round	Eliminated (Episode 19)
Singampuli	Eliminated (Episode 10)								Wildcard Round	Eliminated (Episode 19)
Shali	Eliminated (Episode 8)								Wildcard Round	Eliminated (Episode 19)
Sonia	Eliminated (Episode 5)								Wildcard Round	Eliminated (Episode 19)
Sonia	Eliminated (Episode 5)								Golden table challenge winner	Eliminated (Episode 19)
Left show due to injury	—N/a									
Entered	—N/a	Maneesha & Subash	—N/a						Sonia, Shali, Singampuli, S Dheena, Aishwarya & Maneesha	—N/a
Nominated for elimination	—N/a				S Dheena	Sujatha & Aishwarya	—N/a	Maneesha	Sonia, Shali, Singampuli, S Dheena & Aishwarya	Chaitra
Eliminated	—N/a				S Dheena	Aishwarya	—N/a	Maneesha	Sonia, Shali, Singampuli, S Dheena & Aishwarya	Vijayan
Eliminated	—N/a				S Dheena	Aishwarya	—N/a	Maneesha	Sonia, Shali, Singampuli, S Dheena & Aishwarya	Narendra & Sujatha
