= Cooku with Comali season 4 =

Cooku With Comali
- Season 4
- Hosted by: Rakshan; Manimegalai
- Judges: Chef Damu; Chef Venkatesh Bhat
- No. of contestants: 12
- Winner: Mime Gopi
- Runner-up: Srushti Dange

Release
- Original network: Star Vijay
- Original release: 28 January – 30 July 2023

Season chronology
- ← Previous; Season 3 Next → Season 5

Cooku with Comali 4 is an Indian Tamil-language cooking-comedy television series. Contained here are the results of the fourth season of the show broken down by contestant name.

== Contestants (cooks) ==
S. No.	Name	Entry Episode	Episode Exited	Elimination Faced	Immunity Won	Advantage round	Chef of the week	Status
1	Mime Gopi	Episode 3	Episode 53	1	1	2	3	Winner
2	Srushti Dange	Episode 1	Episode 53	2	1	2	3	1st Runner up
3	Vichithra	Episode 1	Episode 53	2	1	3	6	2nd Runner up
4	Sivangi Krishnakumar	Episode 1	Episode 53	2	2	2	3	3rd Runner up
5	Andreanne Nouyrigat	Episode 1	Episode 40/Episode 53	1	2	6	4	4th Runner Up
6	D. R. K. Kiran	Episode 27	Episode 53	2		2	1	5th Runner Up
7	Gajesh	Episode 27	Episode 34 / Episode 50	1				Eliminated
8	Sherin Shringar	Episode 1	Episode 26 / Episode 50	4			1	Eliminated
9	VJ Vishal	Episode 1	Episode 22 / Episode 50	2	1		2	Eliminated
10	Raj Ayyappa	Episode 1	Episode 18 / Episode 50	1			2	Eliminated
11	Kalaiyan	Episode 1	Episode 14 / Episode 50	2		2		Eliminated
12	Kishore Rajkumar	Episode 1	Episode 6 / Episode 50	1		1		Eliminated

== Comalis ==
- Pugazh
- Monisha Blessy "(Winner Comali)"
- GP Muthu
- Thangadurai
- Sunita Gogoi
- Mohamed Kuraishi "(Winner Comali)"
- Singapore Deepan (Week 1 to Week 16)
- Raveena Daha (Week 1 to Week 14)
- Silmisham Siva (Week 1 to Week 17, Week 23 and Week 25)
- Otteri Siva (Week 1 and 8)
- Manimegalai (From Week 1 to Week 5)
- Bharat K Rajesh (Week 12, Week 15, Week 23 and Week 24 )
- Sarath (Week 12, Week 15, Week 21 and Week 25, Week 26)
- Sakthi (Week 15, Week 26)
- Sheethal Clarin (Week 21, Week 26)
- Adhirchi Arun (Week 21, Week 23 and Week 24)
- Vinoth (Week 21, Week 26)
- Vishwakayi

== Pairings ==
Cooks	Week 1	Week 2	Week 3	Week 4	Week 5	Week 6	Week 7	Week 8	Week 9	Week 10	Week 11	Week 12	Week 13	Week 14	Week 16	Week 17	Week 18	Week 19	Week 20	Week 21	Week 22	Week 23	Week 24	Week 25	Week 26	Week 27
Vichithra	Sunita	Pugazh	Thangadurai	Not participated	Muthu	Monisha	Kuraishi		Raveena	Monisha	Kuraishi	Raveena		Sunita	Thangadurai	Monisha	Sunita	Muthu	Kuraishi	Silmisham Siva	Monisha	Muthu	Immunity	1st Finalist	Sakthi	Muthu Monisha
Gopi	Not participated	Thangadurai	Kuraishi	Deepan	Sunita	Pugazh	Monisha	Muthu	Kuraishi		Immunity	Sunita	Kuraishi	Thangadurai	Monisha	Sunita	Muthu	Monisha	Sunita	Vinoth	Muthu	Sunita	Sunita / Muthu	2nd Finalist	Sakthi	Monisha Kuraishi
Sivaangi	Kuraishi	Manimegalai	Deepan	Monisha	Silmisham Siva		Immunity	Monisha	Pugazh	Sunita		Bharath	Monisha	Muthu	Sunita	Pugazh	Kuraishi		Immunity	Sarath	Sunita	Thangadurai	Adhirchi Arun / Pugazh	3rd Finalist	Sunita	Sunita Thangadurai
Srushti	Pugazh	Sunita	Pugazh	Muthu	Deepan	Muthu	Raveena	Pugazh	Thangadurai		Pugazh		Sunita	Kuraishi	Deepan	Immunity	Pugazh		Muthu	Kuraishi	Pugazh	Sheetal	Monisha / Thangadurai	4th Finalist	Vinoth	Kuraishi Pugazh
Kiran	Wildcard Entry													Pugazh		Thangadurai	Monisha	Sunita	Monisha	Sheethal	Kuraishi	Pugazh	Kuraishi / Bharath	5th Finalist	Kuraishi	Thangadurai Sunita
Andreanne	Muthu		Sunita		Immunity	Sunita		Thangadurai	Immunity	Raveena	Muthu		Pugazh	Raveena	Muthu	Kuraishi	Not participated	Thangadurai	Pugazh	Eliminated				Kuraishi/6th Finalist	Sarath	Pugazh Muthu
Gajesh	Wildcard Entry													Monisha	Kuraishi	Muthu	Eliminated							Monisha	Eliminated	
Sherin	Deepan	Monisha		Pugazh	Kuraishi	Raveena	Pugazh	Raveena	Muthu	Deepan/Muthu	Raveena	Sarath	Thangadurai	Eliminated										Silmisham Siva	Eliminated	
Vishal	Silmisham Siva	Kuraishi	Immunity	Manimegalai	Pugazh	Kuraishi	Thangadurai	Sunitha	Monisha	Pugazh	Monisha	Eliminated												Sunitha	Eliminated	
Ayyappa	Raveena	Silmisham Siva	Manimegalai	Kuraishi	Manimegalai	Thangadurai	Muthu	Deepan	Sunita	Eliminated														Pugazh	Eliminated	
Kaalaiyan	Monisha	Deepan	Muthu	Raveena	Thangadurai	Deepan		Eliminated																Sarath	Eliminated	
Kishore	Otteri Siva	Raveena	Silmisham Siva	Eliminated																				Muthu	Eliminated	

Cooks	Week 15
Gajesh, Sivaangi, Srushti	Muthu, Pugazh, Sakthi, Sarath, Sunitha,
Andreanne, Kiran, Vichithra	Bharath, Deepan, Kuraishi, Monisha, Thangadurai

Cooks (Guests)	Week 12
Rekha	Deepan
Shakeela	Monisha
Roshini	Kuraishi

Cooks (Guests)	Week 21
Shrutika	Pugazh
Darshan	Sunitha
Abhirami	Adhirchi Arun
Muthukumar	Muthu
Roshini	Monisha

Cooks (Guests)	Week 23
Balaji Murugadoss	Adhirchi Arun
Suresh Chakravarthi	Monisha
Janany	Bharath
Aishwarya Dutta	Kuraishi
Maria Juliana	Silmisham Siva

Cooks (Guests)	Week 26
Rithika Tamil Selvi	Pugazh
Dharsha Gupta	Muthu
Shakeela	Sheethal
Madurai Muthu	Silmisham Siva
Deepa Shankar	Monisha

== Release ==
The first promo was released on 6 January 2023 with the slogan "Cook with Comali Sirika Readya Pangali". First episode was telecasted on 28 Jan sat 9.30 pm
