= Top Cooku Dupe Cooku =

Indian Tamil-language reality show

- Genre: Cookery; Comedy
- Based on: Cooku with Comali
- Directed by: Parthiv Mani
- Presented by: VJ Rakesh (season 1–present); Sivaangi Krishnakumar (season 2–present)
- Judges: Chef Venkatesh Bhat (season 1–present); Chef Rammohan (season 1–present); Singer Binni Krishnakumar (season 1; special appearance in one episode in season 2); Mentor Chefs: Chef Adrian (season 2–present); Chef Cheruba (season 1–present); Chef Sai (season 1–present); Chef Saravanan (season 1); Chef Yuvasri (season 1)
- Country of origin: India
- Original language: Tamil
- No. of seasons: 2
- No. of episodes: Season 1: 20

Production
- Producer: Media Masons
- Cinematography: Sudhir Koushik
- Camera setup: Multi-camera
- Running time: Season 1: approx. 65–75 minutes; Season 2: 50 minutes (each on Saturday and Sunday)
- Production company: Media Masons

Original release
- Network: Sun TV; Sun NXT
- Release: 19 May 2024 – present

Top Cooku Dupe Cooku (often abbreviated as TCDC) is an Indian Tamil-language comedy cooking competition show, produced by Media Masons. The show is produced and judged by Venkatesh Bhat, along with Rammohan. In season one, the show was supported by Binni Krishnakumar and hosted by Rakesh, while in season two, it was hosted by Rakesh and Sivaangi Krishnakumar. The show is based on the reality series Cooku with Comali, which was also conceived and produced for four seasons by Media Masons, but for a different channel.

== Format ==
The contestants are referred to as "top cooku" and would be paired up with a "dupe cooku" each week. Some episodes feature one or more guest judges.

Rapid fire round

In season one, the show begins with the rapid fire round, in which the top cookus are given a simple task to complete within 120 seconds. The winner can choose their desired dupe cooku, while others will be paired randomly. This round was absent from season two.

Golden table challenge

After pairing up, teams take part in a 20 minute quick-fire cooking task called the golden table challenge. The winning team earns the right to cook at a special golden workstation equipped with premium amenities, and they enjoy exclusive privileges for the rest of the episode such as immunity, priority access to ingredients, and additional support from their chef mentor.

Main challenge

In each episode, all teams participate in a themed main cooking challenge, where they must create dishes based on a given concept or cuisine. The chefs can guide their teams from a distance and are allowed a limited chef's time-out, where the chef may step into the kitchen and offer verbal instructions. Teams are judged on taste, presentation, and creativity, and the lowest-scoring cook faces elimination.

=== Elimination ===
Elimination box selection (season one)

At the beginning of each episode in season one, the top cookus are presented with two boxes. One box contains a card marked "elimination episode”, while the other contains a card marked “non-elimination episode”. The contestants must jointly choose a box to determine the nature of the episode. If a non-elimination card is selected on two consecutive weeks, the third week automatically becomes an elimination round.

Elimination challenge (season two)

Season two does not use the box selection format. Instead, the show follows a two-week cycle:

- Challenger round: One or more external challengers compete against the existing contestants. They participate in one or more cooking challenges leading up to the one lakh box challenge. If the challenger wins, all current contestants face an elimination round the following week. If one of the contestants wins, only that contestant is safe for the next week, and the remaining contestants must compete in the elimination round.
- Elimination week: The week following the challenger round is an elimination episode where the contestants (except the winners, if any) compete to avoid elimination.

Wild card entry

Halfway through the season, at least one top cooku will join the contestants, called a wild card entry and are assigned a new mentor. Season two featured no wild card entries nor additional mentors.

Final stage

In the final stage of the season, all episodes are either elimination episodes or ticket to the finale rounds leading up to the season finale.

== Judges and hosts ==
Season	Host	Judges (in order of first appearance)			Mentor chefs			
1	VJ Rakesh	Chef Venkatesh Bhat	Chef Rammohan	Binni Krishnakumar	Chef Cheruba	Chef Sai	Chef Saravanan	Chef Yuvasri
2	VJ Rakesh & Sivaangi Krishnakumar	Chef Venkatesh Bhat	Chef Rammohan	-	Chef Cheruba	Chef Sai	Chef Adrian	-

== Series overview ==
Series	Prize Money	Episodes	Originally released			Winners	Runners-up
Series	Prize Money	Episodes	First released	Last released	Network	Winners	Runners-up
1	20 lakhs	20	19 May 2024	29 September 2024	Sun TV; Sun NXT	Narendra Prasath; Sujatha Sivakumar	FEFSI Vijayan; Chaitra Reddy
2	20 lakhs	35	17 August 2025	14 December 2025	Sun TV; Sun NXT	Besant Ravi	Preetha; Delna Davis; Kiran; Vaahesan

== Production ==
=== Development ===
Media Masons producer Ravoofa announced at the end of February that their company was quitting Star Vijay television after 25 years. Later on, Media Masons decide to produce a new cooking show like Cooku with Comali on Sun TV.

=== Release ===
The first season's first promo was unveiled on 28 April 2024. The first season's second promo was unveiled on 1 May 2024, featuring the first contestants FEFSI Vijayan.

== See also ==
- Top Cooku Dupe Cooku season 1
- Top Cooku Dupe Cooku season 2
