= Sivaangi Krishnakumar =

Indian actress, playback singer, television personality (born 2000)

- Born: 25 May 2000 (age 26); Thiruvananthapuram, Kerala, India
- Education: M.O.P. Vaishnav College for Women
- Occupations: Actress; playback singer; television personality
- Years active: 2019–present
- Parents: Dr. K. Krishnakumar (father); Binni Krishnakumar (mother)

Sivaangi Krishnakumar (born 25 May 2000) is an Indian actress, comedian playback singer and television personality. In 2019, she participated in the Tamil singing competition Super Singer 7, which aired on Star Vijay. In 2020, she appeared in the comedy-cooking show, Cooku With Comali, which gained her popularity. She is the daughter of Kalaimamani award-winners Dr. K. Krishnakumar and Binni Krishnakumar. She has acted in films such as Don (2022), Naai Sekar Returns (2022) and Shot Boot Three (2023). She made her debut as a singer in the Malayalam film Boyy Friennd (2005) with the song "Omane".

== Early life ==
Sivaangi was born in Thiruvananthapuram, Kerala to Tamil father Krishnakumar and Malayali mother Binni Krishnakumar, both carnatic singers.

== Career ==
In 2019, Sivaangi made her appearance as a contestant in an Indian Tamil-language reality television singing competition, Super Singer 7, which aired on Vijay TV.

She later was a part of the comedy cooking show Cooku With Comali that aired on Star Vijay. Sivaangi received a well reception across the audiences from becoming a lovable child to the homes of the viewers. She became a popular artist of the time the show released among Children and young audience.

In 2020, Sivaangi made her acting debut in the comedy web series Dear-u Brother-u which was widely viewed during the COVID quarantines.

In 2021, Sivaangi sang "Asku Maaro" with Dharan Kumar, and also made a cameo appearance. Later, in May of that year, she sang "Talku Lessu Worku Moreu" for the movie Murungakkai Chips, alongside Sam Vishal. She later sang on the song "Adipoli", alongside Vineeth Sreenivasan, released as an Onam special.

After her appearance in Cooku with Comali, she was cast in the Tamil film Don, which also marks her acting debut. She was also cast in the movie Naai Sekar Returns (2022), alongside actor Vadivelu. She appeared in a prominent role, alongside Shiva and Priya Anand, in the 2023 film Kasethan Kadavulada.

In 2026, Sivaangi debuted as a music director and composed and co-produced her original song, Ennacho. She recently signed and shooting for a new Tamil film alongside Kalaiyarasan tentatively titled as a Ulta.

== Show Host ==
Sivaangi made her debut as a show anchor in the digital space with the talk show Sing with Sivaangi, which premiered on January 13, 2020, on the Media Masons YouTube channel. The show featured light-hearted conversations with celebrity guests.

She later made her television debut as a full-fledged anchor in the game show Naanum Rowdy Dhaan, which aired on Sun TV (India) in 2025. Also she was the cohost of Top Cooku Dupe Cooku season 2 on Sun TV (India).

== Filmography ==
=== Films ===
Key
†	Denotes films that have not yet been released

List of Sivaangi Krishnakumar film credits
Year	Title	Role(s)	Notes	Ref.
2022	Don	Lilly		
2022	Naai Sekar Returns	Surangani Ambal		
2023	Kasethan Kadavulada	Sakthi		
2023	Shot Boot Three	"Pet" Revathi		

=== Voiceover ===
Key
†	Denotes films that have not yet been released

List of Sivaangi Krishnakumar film credits
Year	Title	Role(s)	For	Language	Notes
2025	Lovely	Lovely the Fly	Animated Character (female protagonist)	Malayalam	Voiceover for animated fly character
2025	Lovely	Lovely the Fly	Animated Character (female protagonist)	Tamil (Dubbed Version)	Voiceover for animated fly character

=== Television ===
List of Sivaangi Krishnakumar television credits
Year	Title	Role	Channel	Language	Notes	Ref.
2019	Super Singer Senior Season 7	Contestant	Vijay TV	Tamil	Top 6	
2020	Super Singer Champion of Champions	Contestant	Vijay TV	Tamil		
2019	Cooku With Comali	Comali	Vijay TV	Tamil		
2020-2021	Cooku With Comali Season 2	Comali	Vijay TV	Tamil		
2022	Cooku With Comali Season 3	Comali	Vijay TV	Tamil		
2022	Comedy Raja Kalakkal Rani	Host	Vijay TV	Tamil	Mid Season	
2023	Cooku With Comali Season 4	Contestant	Vijay TV	Tamil	3rd Runner-Up	
2022	Oo Solriya Oo Oohm Solriya	Contestant	Vijay TV	Tamil		
2023	Super Singer Junior season 9	Guest	Vijay TV	Tamil		
2024	Cooku With Comali Season 5	Guest	Vijay TV	Tamil		
2025	Nanum Rowdy Dhan	Host	Sun TV	Tamil		
2025	Top Cooku Dupe Cooku season 2	Host	Sun TV	Tamil		
2025	Bigg Boss Malayalam Season 7	Guest	Asianet	Malayalam		
2026	Musical Wife	Judge	Flowers TV	Malayalam		
2026	Top Singer 6	Judge	Flowers TV	Malayalam		
2026	Oru Chiri Iru Chiri Bumper Chiri	Guest	Mazhavil Manorama	Malayalam		

=== Web series ===
List of Sivaangi Krishnakumar web series credits
Year	Title	Role	Note	Ref.
2020	Dear-u Brother-u	Sister	YouTube	
2020	When you have a younger sister	Sister	YouTube	

== Discography ==
=== Film songs ===
- All songs are in Tamil unless otherwise noted.

†	Denotes songs that have not yet been released

List of Sivaangi's film song credits
Year	Song	Film	Composer(s)	Co-artists	Language	Notes & Ref.
2005	"Omane"	Boyy Friennd	M. Jayachandran	Sujatha Mohan, K. K. Nishad	Malayalam	Sung the child singing portions and the child laughing portions
2009	"Anbaale"	Pasanga	James Vasanthan	M. Balamuralikrishna	Tamil	Credited as Baby Sivaangi
2021	"Talku Lessu Worku Moreu"	Murungakkai Chips	Dharan Kumar	Sam Vishal	Tamil	Debut Film song
2021	"Machi"	Mayan	M. S. Jones Rupert	Silambarasan	Tamil	Unreleased film
2021	"Andhapura Annakili Da"	Chota	P.S Ashwin	Solo	Tamil	Unreleased film
2021	"Uruttu"	Enna Solla Pogirai	Vivek-Mervin	Santesh, Vivek-Mervin	Tamil	
2021	"Nee En Usuru Pulla"	Anandham Vilayadum Veedu	Siddhu Kumar	G.V. Prakash	Tamil	
2021	"Sathiyama Sollurandi"	Velan	Gopi Sundar	Mugen Rao	Tamil	
2021	"Bomma Bomma"	Koogle Kuttappa	Ghibran	Arivu	Tamil	
2022	"Neethanada"	Enna Solla Pogirai	Vivek-Mervin	Solo	Tamil	
2022	"Rekkalu Thodigi"	Allantha Doorana (Telugu)	Radhan	Naresh Iyer	Telugu	Telugu Debut Film song; Unreleased film
2022	"Rekkaya Virichu"	Ennai Maatrum Kadhal (Dubbed)	Radhan	Naresh Iyer	Tamil	Unreleased film
2022	"Nenjellam"	Sinam	Shabir	G. V. Prakash Kumar	Tamil	
2022	"Kanjaadai Kal Veesi"	Sanjeevan	Tanuj Menon	Naresh Iyer	Tamil	
2022	"Mallipoo"	Vendhu Thanindhathu Kaadu	A.R.Rahman	Madhushree	Tamil	Backing Vocals (Intro portions)
2022	"Kaar Irul"	Amigo Garage	Balamurali Balu	G. V. Prakash Kumar	Tamil	
2022	"MMBB Starwar"	Golmaal	Aruldev	SPB Charan, Ranjith, Priyanka Deshpande	Tamil	Unreleased film
2023	"Nightingale"	Priyamudan Priya	Srikanth Deva	Saranya	Tamil	
2023	"Onnum Thonala"	Badava	John Peter	Deepak Blue	Tamil	
2023	"Chillanjirukkiye"	Lubber Pandhu	Sean Roldan	Pradeep Kumar	Tamil	
2024	"My Dear Pondatti"	Dear	G. V. Prakash Kumar	Harsha Vardhan	Tamil	
2024	"Nanban Oruvan Vantha Piragu"	Nanban Oruvan Vantha Piragu	A.H.Kaashif	Sam Vishal, Ajay Krishna, Srinisha Jayaseelan	Tamil	
2024	"Water Packet"	Raayan (Dubbed)	A.R.Rahman	Yadu Krishna	Malayalam	
2025	"Bejaara Aanen"	Love Marriage	Sean Roldan	Solo	Tamil	
2025	"Golugappa"	Sotta Sotta Nanaiyuthu	Renjith Unni	Javed Ali	Tamil	
2026	"Orey Nila"	Gandhi Talks	AR Rahman	Yadu Krishna	Malayalam	
2026	"Narayanamma"	Aadarsha Kutumbam House No: 47 - AK47	S.S. Thaman	Ram Miriyala, Prabha	Telugu	
2026	"Kannum Kannum"	Hello Kadhal	G.V. Prakash	Kapil Kapilan	Tamil	

=== Independent songs ===
†	Denotes songs that have not yet been released

List of Sivaangi Krishnakumar independent song credits
Year	Song	Label	Composer(s)	Language	Co-artists	Ref.
2020	Solla Maatten Po	Lahari Music	Amritesh Vijayan	Tamil	Sam Vishal	
2021	Asku Maaro	Sony Music	Dharan Kumar	Tamil	Dharan Kumar	
2021	Asku Maaro	Sony Music	Dharan Kumar	Telugu (Dubbed)	Dharan Kumar	
2021	Adipoli	Think Music	Siddhu Kumar	Tamil	Vineeth Sreenivasan	
2021	No No No No	MM Originals	Karthick Devaraj	Tamil	KJ Iyenar, Hrithik, Ahana, Vidyarupini	
2022	Saaya	Saregama	Mithun Eshwar	Tamil	Mithun Eshwar	
2022	Saaya	Saregama	Mithun Eshwar	Malayalam	Mithun Eshwar	
2022	Mounamaay	Muzik 247	Sadar Nedumangad	Malayalam	Vineeth Srinivasan	
2022	Muttu Mu2	Divo	TeeJay Arunasalam	Tamil	Teejay Arunasalam, Yogi B	
2022	Deewana (1 Minute Music Video)	Instagram	AniVee	Tamil	Solo	
2023	Ticky Ticky Taa	Saregama	Darbuka Siva	Tamil	Darbuka Siva, Asal Kolaar	
2023	Mangal Din	Sufiscore	Abby V & Ricky Kej	Hindi	Abby V	A song featured in the Aarambh album
2023	Lala Heart-u Nikkala	MM Originals	Harsha Vardhan	Tamil	Harsha Vardhan	
2024	Ven Sango	VM Originals	Vivek–Mervin	Tamil	Mervin Solomon	
2025	Jamanthi	MC Audios And Videos Malayalam	Ram Surendar	Malayalam	Solo	
2026	Ennacho	Sony Music India	Sivaangi	Tamil	Solo	Debut as Composer
2026	Govindha Emmai Kaappai	Saregama South Devotional	Karthik Raja	Tamil	Solo	
2026	Oru Pakka kadhal	yoursmusicallyph	Pavithra Hariharan	Tamil	Devzart	
2026	Thaamaraiyil Veetrirukkum	Saregama South Devotional	Karthik Raja	Tamil	Solo	

== Accolades ==
=== Awards and nominations ===
Sivaangi Krishnakumar awards and nominations
Awards and nominations
Award	Wins	Nominations
Behindwoods	1	1
Blacksheep Awards	1	1
Radio City Women awards	1	1
Galatta Digital Awards	1	1
Meta	1	1
Galatta Wonder Women Awards	1	1

Totals (Note: Certain award groups do not simply award one winner. They acknowledge several different recipients, have runners-up, and have third place. Since this is a specific recognition and is different from losing an award, runner-up mentions are considered wins in this award tally. For simplification and to avoid errors, each award in this list has been presumed to have had a prior nomination.)
- Wins: 6
- Nominations: 6

List of Sivaangi Krishnakumar awards and nominations
Year	Award	Category	Work	Result	Ref.
2021	Blacksheep Awards	Best Entertainer of the Year - Female	Cooku with Comali (season 2)	Won	
2021	Behindwoods Gold Icon Awards	Most Popular Person on Reality Television - Female	Cooku with Comali (season 2)	Won	
2021	Vijay Television Awards	Trending Pair of the Year (along with Ashwin Kumar Lakshmikanthan)	Cooku with Comali (season 2)	Won	
2022	Radio City Women Entertainer Awards	Women Entertainer	Cooku with Comali	Won	
2022	Aval Vikatan Awards	Viral Star		Won	
2022	Galatta Digital Awards	Youth Icon of Digital Media		Won	
2023	Meta	Best Storyteller		Won	
2024	Galatta Wonder Women Awards	Rising Star of Tamil Cinema (Music)		Won	
2025	Galatta: Dream Lover Favourite Singer (Female)	Favourite Singer (Female)		Won	
2025	JFW Movie Awards	Best Singer	"Chillanjirukkiye" from Lubber Pandhu	Nominated	
2025	Edison Awards	Best Playback Singer (Female)	"Chillanjirukkiye" from Lubber Pandhu	Nominated	
2025	Anandha Vikatan Cinema Vikatan Awards	Best Playback Singer (Female)	"Chillanjirukkiye" from Lubber Pandhu	Nominated	
2025	JFW Awards	Favorite Television Sensation Tamil Nadu		Won	

=== Other recognitions ===
She was listed by the Indiaglitz website as the "[Most] Desirable Woman on Television [in] 2020".
