= Naanum Rowdy Dhaan (disambiguation) =

Naanum Rowdy Dhaan is a 2015 Indian film.

Naanum Rowdy Dhaan may also refer to:

- Naanum Rowdy Dhaan (soundtrack), of the 2015 film
- Naanum Rowdy Dhaan (TV series), a 2025 TV series
