= Naanum Rowdy Dhaan (TV series) =

2025 Indian reality show

- Also known as: நானும் ரௌடி தான்
- Genre: Kids; Reality show
- Presented by: Sivaangi Krishnakumar; Ashwath
- Country of origin: India
- Original language: Tamil
- No. of seasons: 1
- No. of episodes: 20

Production
- Production location: Tamil Nadu
- Camera setup: Multi-camera
- Running time: approx. 40–44 minutes per episode
- Production company: Media Masons

Original release
- Network: Sun TV
- Release: 30 March – 10 August 2025

Naanum Rowdy Dhaan (transl. I am a rowdy too) is a 2025 Indian Tamil-language reality show which premiered on 30 March 2025 on Sun TV, and is also available on the digital platform Sun NXT. The show is hosted by Sivaangi Krishnakumar, Ashwath and Production by Media Masons. The show aired on every Sunday at 12:30PM.

== Overview ==
The show is Kutty Dragons (kids) take on the Dragons (Celebrities) in a fun battle of wits. The one Dragon having the most points at the end of the rounds wins the game.

== Episodes ==
Epi	Airing	Celebrity	Ref
1	30 March 2025	Venkatesh Bhat; Abi Nakshathra; Dheena	
2	6 April 2025	Narendra Prasath; Adhirichi Arun; Monisha Blessy	
3	13 April 2025	Kaalaiyan; Abi Shambavy; GP Muthu	
4	20 April 2025	Singampuli; VJ Nikki; Nikitha	
5	27 April 2025	Reshma; Karthi; Chaitra	
6	4 May 2025	Binni Krishnakumar; Kathir; Akshaya	
7	11 May 2025	Maneesha Mahesh; Amaljith; Alagappan	
8	18 May 2025	Devadarshini; Mahalingam; Bharath Kumar	
9	25 May 2025	Priyadarshini; Haripriya Isai; Vidyullekha Raman	
10	1 June 2025	Delna Davis; Gayatri Jayaraman; Jay Srinivasa Kumar	
11	8 June 2025	P. Unnikrishnan; Sam Vishal; Gabriella Charlton	
12	15 June 2025	Krishna; Sujatha Sivakumar; Arthika	
13	22 June 2025	Ambika; Vijay Venkatesan; Soniya Suresh	
14	29 June 2025	Shrutika Arjun; Darshan; Nandan Loganathan	
15	6 July 2025	Uma Riyaz Khan; Shariq Hassan; Sanjeev Karthick	
16	13 July 2025	Divya Ganesh; Dev; Jokalshmi	
17	20 July 2025	Bharath; Swathi Konde; Krithika Laddu	
18	27 July 2025	Swetha; Deepa Shankar; Niyaz Khan	
19	3 August 2025	Bhavithra; Vijayan; Sham	
20	10 August 2025	Parvathy; Vimalkumar J Sakthi	

== Production ==
In 16 March 2025, the show was announced by Sun TV and Production by Media Masons, who produced shows such as Top Cooku Dupe Cooku and Mama Manasilaayo. The first promo was released on same day by revealing Yaar Antha Akka?, with actor Alagappan (Anandha Ragam fame) and Sujatha Sivakumar (Paruthiveeran fame).

Star Vijay fame Sivaangi Krishnakumar who commonly joined with Media Masons's projects such as Super Singer 7 and Cooku With Comali she is first time in Sun TV as host with Aswanth.
