= Nakshathrakkannulla Rajakumaran Avanundoru Rajakumari =

2002 film by Rajasenan

- DVD Cover
- Directed by: Rajasenan
- Written by: V. C. Ashok
- Produced by: Khader Hassan
- Starring: Prithviraj Sukumaran; Gayathri Raghuram; Kalabhavan Mani; Narendra Prasad; Jagathy Sreekumar
- Cinematography: Ramachandra Babu
- Edited by: Raja Mohammad
- Music by: Benny Kannan
- Production company: Hash Bush Films
- Release date: 13 September 2002
- Country: India
- Language: Malayalam

Nakshathrakkannulla Rajakumaran Avanundoru Rajakumari (transl. Star-eyed prince, he has a princess) is a 2002 Indian Malayalam-language romantic drama film directed by Rajasenan. It stars Prithviraj Sukumaran and Gayathri Raghuram. Kalabhavan Mani, Narendra Prasad and Jagathy Sreekumar play supporting roles.

== Plot ==
The story revolves around a family that claim to be the descendants of Thacholi Othenan, a warrior of the Vadakkanpattu lore. Bhageerathi Amma has two sons, Veerabhadra Kuruppu and Kochchukuruppu, and a daughter Subhadra, who constantly feud with each other. The elder Kuruppu's daughter Aswathy is in love with her muracherukkan, Subhadra's son Ananthu, but their parents object to the match. They are encouraged by Chandutty, Bhaskaran and Shankunni. They hope that Aswathy's brother Karthik will come to their rescue, but he turns against the lovers on the advice of his father. Raziya Begum turns up, claiming to be Karthik's lover. Ananthu and his gang use this opportunity to fix Karthik, and Kochukuruppu gives them a lot of muscle support. Rasiya gets pregnant, thus Kuruppu decides to kill Anandhu & Rasiya. Kochukuruppu and gang rescues them with the help of Karthik. Later, Aswathy and Anandhu elope. After a lot of buffoonery and mistaken identity, both the families get united. They accept Rasiya and later, Achu and Ananthu reunite with their family.

== Cast ==
- Prithviraj Sukumaran as Ananthan
- Gayathri Raghuram as Aswathy
- Kalabhavan Mani as Kochu Kurup
- Narendra Prasad as Adv.Veerabhadra Kurup
- Jagathy Sreekumar as Chattutty
- Rayan Raj as Karthik (voice dubbed by Mithun Ramesh)
- Anjali Krishna as Raziya
- Cicily Joy as Subhadra
- Sabumon Abdusamad as Bhaskaran
- Kundara Johny as Kunju Raman
- Shobha Mohan as Janaki, Veerabhadra Kurup's wife
- K. R. Vijaya as Bhageerathi Amma, Veerabhadra Kurup's and Kochu Kurup's mother
- Munshi Baiju as Shankunny
- Archana Menon as Athira
- Usha as Cheeru
- Sreekala Thaha as Chanthutty's mother

== Soundtrack ==
The film's soundtrack was composed by Benny Kannan, with lyrics penned by S. Ramesan Nair.

Soundtrack Album
#	Song	Singers
1	"Kalarikkum"	K. K. Nishad
2	"Manassukal Thammil (Puthooram)"	K. K. Nishad
3	"Ore Mugham" (F)	Sujatha Mohan
4	"Ore Mugham" (D)	Vidhu Prathap, Sujatha Mohan
5	"Poomaanam"	Santhosh Keshav, Jyothi
6	"Sundari"	P. K. Sunil Kumar, Aneesha
7	"Thankam Kondoru (Punchiri Mottinu)"	Santhosh Keshav, Lekha R. Nair, Pushpavathy, Vandana Menon
