= Maaya Thotta =

- Genre: Action; Thriller
- Written by: Nandhakumar Raju
- Directed by: Nandhakumar Raju
- Starring: Amit Bhargav; Chaitra Reddy; Kumaran Thangarajan
- Country of origin: India
- Original language: Tamil
- No. of seasons: 1
- No. of episodes: 6

Production
- Producers: Madhu Alexander; Prabhu Antony
- Running time: 25-30 minutes
- Production company: Roox Media Pvt Ltd

Original release
- Network: Hungama
- Release: 28 February 2023

Maaya Thotta (மாய தோட்டா) is a 2023 Indian Tamil-language Action crime thriller streaming television series.

The principal characters of the series include Amit Bhargav, Chaitra Reddy and Kumaran Thangarajan] The six episodes series premiered on Hungama on 28 February 2023.

== Cast ==
- Amit Bhargav as Ranjan
- Chaitra Reddy as Maya
- Kumaran Thangarajan as Bharath, Z level protection.
- Vaishali Thaniga as Akalya Ranjan

== Development ==
=== Production ===
The series is produced by Madhu Alexander and Prabhu Antony under the production Roox Media Private limited. It was first Tamil Original series for Hungama.
