= Rugged =

- Directed by: Mahesh Gowda
- Written by: Mahesh Gowda
- Produced by: Arun Kumar A
- Starring: Vinod Prabhakar; Chaitra Reddy
- Music by: Abhimann Roy
- Production company: Amma Cine Creations
- Release date: 29 March 2019
- Country: India
- Language: Kannada

Rugged is a 2019 Indian Kannada-language romantic action film written and directed by Mahesh Gowda and produced by Arun Kumar A. The film stars Vinod Prabhakar and Chaitra Reddy. The film's caption is "Neenu Malagisiruva Goriyolage Nanninu Jeevathavagiddene". This Movie was launched in November 2017

The project marks the first in the combination of Mahesh Gowda, Vinod Prabhakar and producer Arun Kumar A.

== Cast ==
- Vinod Prabhakar as Shivu
- Chaitra Reddy as Nandini
- Rajesh Nataranga
- Om Prakash Rao
- Deepak Shetty
- Thriller Manju

== Production ==
Vinod Prabhakar shed weight for the film.

== Soundtrack ==
Rugged

Soundtrack album by Abhimann Roy
- Recorded: 2018
- Genre: Feature film soundtrack
- Label: Lahari Music

Track list
No.	Title	Singer(s)	Length
1.	"Avanade Yochane"	Sony Komanduri

== Reception ==
A critic from The Times of India rated the film two out of five stars and wrote that "Rugged is for die-hard commercial film watchers".
