= Boyy Friennd =

2001 film directed by Vinayan

- Film poster
- Directed by: Vinayan
- Screenplay by: J. Pallassery
- Story by: Vinayan
- Produced by: Vidyasagar
- Starring: Sreenivasan; Manikuttan; Mukesh; Madhumitha; Honey Rose; Lakshmi Gopalaswamy
- Cinematography: Jibu Jacob
- Edited by: G. Murali
- Music by: M. Jayachandran
- Release date: 28 October 2005
- Country: India
- Language: Malayalam

Boyy Friennd is a 2005 Indian Malayalam-language romantic drama film directed by Vinayan and written by J. Pallassery from a story by Vinayan. The film stars Sreenivasan, Manikuttan, Mukesh, Madhumitha, Honey Rose and Lakshmi Gopalaswamy. The film was released on 28 October 2005. This movie marked the debut of Honey Rose.

== Plot ==
This is a movie about Ramesh, a college student and his widowed mother Nandhini, and how their normal life takes a turn when a minister named Nadeshan, who has a grudge against them, is found murdered and they get suspected for the murder. But they are proven innocent because of city police commissioner Idiyan Kartha, with the help of CI Vigneshwaran and Nadeshan's twin, Dineshan. They find out that Minister Thankappan was the one behind the killing of Nadeshan, as Nadeshan mocked him for wanting to become the minister and Dasappan, who was the witness, helped him cover his crime. Finally, Ramesh is reunited not only with his mother, but also Julie and her friend. DGP Chandrakumar is disappointed not only that IG Stephen Tharakkan arrests him because of the pressure from the minister to arrest Thankappan.

== Cast ==
- Sreenivasan as Commissioner "Idiyan" Kartha IPS
- Mukesh in a dual role as:
  - Home Minister Nadeshan
  - Dineshan
- Manikuttan as Ramesh Prasad
- Madhumitha as Lekha
- Honey Rose as Julie
- Lakshmi Gopalaswamy as Nandini Prasad, Rameshan's mother
- Lalu Alex as Father Kacharathara
- Jagadish as CI Vigneshwaran
- Harisree Ashokan as Minister Thankappan (main antagonist)
- Augustine as Dasappan (secondary antagonist)
- K. B. Ganesh Kumar as Prasad, Rameshan's father
- Sadiq as DYSP Alex Paul
- Bindu Panicker as Mary Pius Madam
- Idavela Babu as Arumukhan
- T. P. Madhavan as Leader K.R
- Captain Raju as DGP Chandrakumar IPS
- Spadikam George as IG Stephen Tharakan IPS
- Mamukkoya as Khader
- Chandra Lakshman as Khader's daughter
- Priyanka Anoop as PC Durga
- Chali Pala as SI Bhargavan
- Kollam Ajith as CI Georgekutty
- Tini Tom as Mammootty (VFX)
- Madhan Lal as Mohanlal (VFX)
- K. J. Yesudas (special appearance in the song "Ramzan Nilavotha")
- Krishnaprabha

== Soundtrack ==
Music: M. Jayachandran, Lyrics: Kaithapram Damodaran Namboothiri, R. K. Damodaran

- "Omane" - Sujatha Mohan, K. K. Nishad
- "Ramzan Nilaavotha" - K. J. Yesudas
- "Ramzan Nilaavotha" (D) - K. J. Yesudas, Binni Krishnakumar
- "Vennilaa" - Afsal, Cicily
- "Yo Yo Payya Mittayi Payya Thattenkil Thattinu Mutti Pottikkumeda" - Jyotsna, Alex Kayyalaykkal, Ranjini Jose
