= Sarkar Dada =

- DVD cover
- Directed by: Sasi Shanker
- Produced by: Kalliyoor Sasi
- Starring: Jayaram; Navya Nair; Salim Kumar; Kalasala Babu
- Cinematography: Anandakuttan
- Edited by: G. Murali
- Music by: M. Jayachandran
- Production company: Aparna Cinema
- Release date: 18 November 2005
- Running time: 131 minutes
- Country: India
- Language: Malayalam

Sarkar Dada or Sarkkar Dada is a 2005 Indian Malayalam-language action film directed by Sasi Shanker and produced by Kalliyoor Sasi. The film stars Jayaram, Navya Nair, Salim Kumar and Kalasala Babu in lead roles. The film had musical score by M. Jayachandran. The film was a commercial failure and received negative reviews from critics.

== Plot ==
The plot revolves around Srimangalatthu Mukundan Menon, who is raised as a ruffian by his guardian, Advocate Damodaran Nambiar. Damodaran Nambiar intends to grab the immense wealth of Mukundan Menon's parents. However, Mukundan Menon may be seen in the intrigues going on around him. Finally, the government steps in and assigns RDO Sandhya to look after his property. She does it, and he does it well.

== Cast ==
- Jayaram in a dual role as:
  - Srimangalatthu Mukundan Menon (Sarkar Dada)
  - Srimangalatthu Gopinatha Menon
- Navya Nair as RDO Sandhya
- Salim Kumar as Kumaran
- Harishree Ashokan as Putturumees
- Cochin Haneefa as SI Sundareshan
- Jagadish as Velayudhan
- Kalasala Babu as Adv. Damodaran Nambiar
- Baiju as Murali Nambiar
- Besant Ravi as Karim Bhai
- Riyaz Khan as Abbas
- Nivia Rebin

== Soundtrack ==
Sarkar Dadha

Soundtrack album by M. Jayachandran
- Released: January 2005
- Studios: Krishna Digi Design, Chennai
- Genre: Feature film soundtrack
- Length: 29:17
- Language: Malayalam
- Label: Polychrome

The film's soundtrack album was composed by M. Jayachandran and lyrics were penned by Girish Puthenchery.

List of songs
No.	Title	Singer(s)	Length
1.	"Tik Tik"	M. G. Sreekumar, Sujatha	04:44
2.	"Salaam Salaam"	Afsal, K. K. Nishad, Ganga	04:00
3.	"Thulaminnal"	Sujatha	04:15
4.	"Ruthu Ruthu"	M. G. Sreekumar	03:37
5.	"Nadodi Paattinte"	K. J. Yesudas, Sharreth	04:41
6.	"Kallu Paattu"	Alex Kayyalaykkal, K. K. Nishad	03:17
7.	"Tik Tik"	Sujatha	04:43
Total length:			29:17
