= Monisha Blessy =

Indian actress

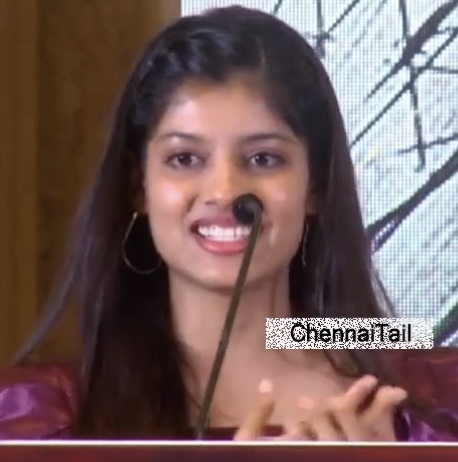
- Monisha at Maaveeran press meet in Taj Connemara
- Other names: Monisha, Moni
- Education: M.Sc. in Electronic Media
- Occupations: Actress, television personality, comedian, content creator
- Years active: 2019–present
- Known for: Sun TV, Star Vijay, Blacksheep TV
- Website: https://youtube.com/@monishablessyhere

Monisha Blessy is an Indian actress who works in Tamil films and television. She made her debut with the film Maaveeran (2023).

== Education ==
She attained a MSc in Electronic Media at the University of Madras.

== Career ==
Monisha started her career as a one-day VJ at Sun TV Network. She made her acting debut in conceptual videos produced by the Blacksheep group. She contested in the eighth season of Kalakka Povathu Yaaru? and finished as the runner up. Monisha rose to prominence after participating in Cooku with Comali season 4. She made her film debut with Maaveeran directed by Madonne Ashwin, featuring Sivakarthikeyan. She also starred in television series such as Modern Love Chennai. In 2024, she participated in Top Cooku Dupe Cooku. Her latest released project is the second season of Suzhal. She has announced her involvement in Jana Nayagan and Coolie, describing the opportunity as a blessing.

== Filmography ==
Key
| † | Denotes films that have not yet been released |

=== Films ===
| Year | Title | Role(s) | Notes |
|---|---|---|---|
| 2023 | Maaveeran | Raji | Debut film |
| 2025 | Coolie | Priya Rajasekar | |
| 2026 | Jana Nayagan | Vaishali | |

=== Television ===
| Year | Title | Role | Network | Notes |
|---|---|---|---|---|
| 2019 | Kalakka Povathu Yaaru? | Contestant | Star Vijay | Runner up |
| 2023 | Cooku with Comali 4 | Comali | Star Vijay | |
| 2023 | Modern Love Chennai | Shru | Amazon Prime Video | |
| 2024 | Top Cooku Dupe Cooku | Dupe Cooku | Sun TV | |
| 2025 | Suzhal: The Vortex | Muppi | Amazon Prime Video | Season Two |
| 2025 | Top Cooku Dupe Cooku season 2 | Dupe Cooku | Sun TV | |

== Awards and nominations ==
Awards and nominations
| Year | Award | Category | Result | Ref |
|---|---|---|---|---|
| 2024 | Ananda Vikatan Nambikkai Awards | Top-10 Ilaignar | Won | |
