= Joot =

2003 Indian Tamil-language film

- DVD cover
- Directed by: Azhagam Perumal
- Screenplay by: Azhagam Perumal
- Story by: M. S. Ramesh
- Produced by: T. Ajay Kumar
- Starring: Srikanth; Meera Jasmine
- Cinematography: Vijay Milton; G. Shyamkumar
- Edited by: A. Raja Mohammed
- Music by: Vidyasagar
- Production company: Sri Lakshmi Productions
- Release date: 19 December 2003
- Country: India
- Language: Tamil

Joot: Are You Ready (transl. Run) is a 2003 Indian Tamil-language masala film directed by Azhagam Perumal, starring Srikanth and Meera Jasmine with Vivek, FEFSI Vijayan and Murali in supporting roles. The film was released on 19 December 2003.

== Plot ==
From a small rural village, Eashwaran goes to a big city, Chennai, with his father, seeking medicine to treat an illness. While in town, they live at the home of Eashwaran's brother, who is caught up in a dangerous web of corruption involving a thug named Aditya. As Aditya continues to head dirty deals with local officials, Eashwaran is in over his head and may need his brother's help.

== Cast ==
- Srikanth as Eashwaran
- Meera Jasmine as Meera
- Vivek as Siva
- FEFSI Vijayan as Aditya
- Murali as Eashwaran's father
- Shyam Ganesh as Ganeshan, Eashwaran's brother
- Brahmaji as M. Prakasam IPS
- Tarzan as Aditya's henchman
- Ravikumar as a baby's father
- Tejashree
- Suvarna Mathew as Gayathri
- Indhu as a baby's mother
- Lavanya as Megala, Eashwaran's sister-in-law
- Siva Narayana Murthy as a police officer
- Kovai Senthil as a doctor
- Muthukaalai as the security guard
- Karnaa Radha as Eashwaran's neighbor
- Robo Shankar as Aditya's henchman (uncredited)
- Sampath Ram as police officer (uncredited)
- Amirthalingam as a fruit vendor (uncredited)

== Soundtrack ==
Music is composed by Vidyasagar.

Song title	Singers	Lyrics
"Kattabomma Kattabomma"	Tippu, Nandini Srikar	Na. Muthukumar
"Vedi Veesuraan"	Jyotsna, Karthik	P. Vijay
"Aadivarum Azhagiya"	Manikka Vinayagam, Karthik, Tippu	Na. Muthukumar
"Azhagiya Koondal"	Karthik, Srivarthini	Kabilan
"Enna Enna"	Vijay Yesudas, Rajalakshmi	Yugabharathi

== Critical reception ==
Sify wrote, "The story of Joot is as stale as yesterday's bread, as the plot is clichéd and seen in umpteen mass films in the same genre. The first half when the hero comes to the city from a village and gets into a fight with local goons for no fault of his, reminds you of Dhool." Malini Mannath of Chennai Online praised Srikanth for performing his first action oriented role "with the same sincerity and credibility as he had performed his earlier roles" while also praising the fight choreography of Fefsi Vijayan and concluded "He's [Azhagam Perumal] handled love stories (Dumm Dumm Dumm) earlier, and now Azhagam Perumal proves that he can handle an action film too with equal conviction. Only if there hadn't been a sense of deja vu throughout!". Visual Dasan of Kalki wrote that for masala films which are known for entertaining audiences, story has always been secondary, and this film was no exception. He said the director's talent for asking what is next shines through in both visual settings and screenplay.

The Hindu wrote "ON THE lines of "Dhil" and "Dhool" comes Sree Lakshmi Productions' "Joot" and in keeping with the trend, Srikanth has opted for a change of image. Though racy for the most part, except the song sequences that are the usual spokes in the wheel, the story (M. S. Ramesh) is typical of the innumerable actioners you've been watching over the years". Deccan Herald wrote "There are no unnecessary sentiments, social messages, and boring advices in the film. It’s a straight, fun filled film". Cinesouth wrote "It's a shock to see such a masala film from the director who had given us the poetic love story like 'Dum Dum Dum'. But, it's nice to see that the director didn't opt for the easy route to masala success as in films like 'Dil', 'Saami' and 'Dhool'". Indiainfo wrote "The film has shades of many offbeat Hindi films that came in the 80s. Good music by Vidyasagar, Srikanth’s performance and Perumal’s narration are strong points. Meera Jasmine is okay".
