= Chandramukhi (2005 soundtrack) =

Chandramukhi (Original Motion Picture Soundtrack)
- Tamil version cover

Soundtrack album by Vidyasagar
- Released: 5 March 2005
- Recorded: 2004–2005
- Studios: Varsha Vallaki Studios, Chennai
- Genre: Feature film soundtrack
- Length: 29:51
- Labels: Star Music; Ayngaran Music; An Ak Audio
- Producer: Vidyasagar

Vidyasagar chronology
| Ji (2005) | Chandramukhi (Original Motion Picture Soundtrack) (2005) | Kana Kandaen (2005) |

Chandramukhi (Original Motion Picture Soundtrack) is the soundtrack to the 2005 film of the same name written and directed by P. Vasu. It is a remake of Vasu's Kannada film Apthamitra (2004) which itself was remake of Malayalam film Manichitrathazhu (1993). The film stars Rajinikanth, Jyothika and Prabhu along with an ensemble supporting cast, including Vadivelu, Nayanthara, Vineeth, Nassar and Sheela. It revolves around a woman (Jyothika) with dissociative identity disorder that affects her family, and a psychiatrist (Rajinikanth) who intends to solve the case while risking his life. The film's six-song soundtrack and background score are composed by Vidyasagar with lyrics written by Vaali, Yugabharathi, Pa. Vijay, Na. Muthukumar and Bhuvana Chandra. The soundtrack was released on 5 March 2005.

== Background ==
Chandramukhi is Vidyasagar's first and only collaboration with Rajinikanth, and also being the first time where the actor's film was scored by a different composer apart from Deva and A. R. Rahman in the past decade. (Note: Before Chandramukhi, Deva had composed for Rajinikanth's Annaamalai (1992), Baashha (1995) and Arunachalam (1997), while Rahman worked with the actor in Muthu (1995), Padayappa (1999) and Baba (2002).) Vidyasagar composed six songs for the film keeping in mind that it would appeal to every listener; all of them belong to different genres—folk ("Devuda Devuda", "Kokku Para Para"), melody ("Konjam Neram", "Athinthom"), peppy ("Annanoda Pattu") and semi-classical ("Raa Raa").

S. P. Balasubrahmanyam sang the opening track "Devuda Devuda" as he did with most of the introductory songs for Rajinikanth's films, and also the song "Athinthom". The latter is based on the traditional Malayalam song of the same name.

The semi-classical number "Raa Raa" was written in Telugu by lyricist Bhuvana Chandra; it is based on the Surya raaga, which is also known as the Sallabham raaga, and the chorus portion was reused from the eponymous song of the film's original counterpart Apthamitra (2004) composed by Gurukiran. Vidyasagar enlisted Binny Krishnakumar to record the female counterparts. As it was her maiden stint in playback singing, she gave a cassette of her songs to the composer and six months later, she recorded the song at her studio in Chennai.

The duet "Konjum Neram" was performed by Madhu Balakrishnan and Asha Bhosle, who was roped in after producer Ramkumar Ganesan suggested her name. Bhosle stated: "My association with Sivaji Productions dates back to the late 1950s with Amardeep, in which I sang three songs. When I got this invitation, I thought it was a great time to come to Chennai and catch up with old friends. I recorded this lovely song and later visited Kamala Ganesan and spent some time with her." Besides singing the song, she was also invited as the chief guest to attend the audio launch.

== Marketing and release ==
The music rights for the film were sold to Sanjay Wadhwa of AnAK audio, later known as AP International for ₹11 million. (Note: The exchange rate in 2005 was 45.3 Indian rupees (₹) per 1 US dollar (US$).) Tata Indicom and Sunfeast Biscuits were the sponsors for the audio launch and marketing. The album was released at the film's music launch held on 5 March 2005 at the Taj Connemara hotel in Chennai. The event saw the attendance of actors Vijay, Karthik, Jayam Ravi, Jiiva, Sukanya, composer M. S. Viswanathan alongside the cast and crew and over 1000 fans being present at the event. According to Sify, it was the "biggest ever audio launch for a Tamil film in recent times, when the audio market is at an all time low". An overseas audio launch took place the next day in Malaysia.

Post the album's release, the audio promos and 30-second clippings from the songs were televised on all channels from 7 March. The CD cover of the album features a still of Rajinikanth from "Devuda Devuda" with liner notes in the background.

After several months, the producers issued an original soundtrack—which includes the background score and the dialogues from the film—were released on 27 September 2005 at the film's silver jubilee event, in the presence of Ramkumar, Prabhu, Vidyasagar and Vasu. The first time, a re-recording of the film score being unveiled into a separate album, it was accompanied with a video CD titled "The making of Chandramukhi". Released as a limited-edition collectable, the soundtrack was unveiled after tremendous pressure from the actor's fans and the proceedings from the CD sales will be donated to the Sivaji-Prabhu Charities Trust.

== Reception ==
=== Sales and records ===
Prior to the audio launch, over 1.5 lakh cassettes and 30,000 compact discs were pre-booked even before it was made available wholesale. Wadhwa further intended to sell another one lakh cassettes before the film's release, totaling up to 2.5 lakh in number. Due to the huge demand, various shops had opened sales for the audio at 6:00 a.m. on 5 March 2005 by delivery agents. At the Music World shop in Chennai, 437 cassettes and 227 CDs were sold on the first day of its stock release. The cassettes were priced at ₹45 each and CD's at ₹99 each. According to Sreedhar Pillai of The Hindu, the album sold nearly 2.62 lakh cassettes and CDs becoming the highest-selling album of the year in Tamil Nadu. However, he found it much lower than that of Muthu and Padayappa, which he attributed it to the rise of digital downloads in Chennai and other urban areas.

=== Critical reception ===
The album received positive reviews from critics. Siddhu Warrier of Rediff.com said that "Devuda Devuda" "finds S. P. Balasubramanian in top form". He called "Konjam Neram" "melodious in a forgettable kind of way", "Athinthom" a "soft, melodious song", "Kokku Para Para" as "insipid", "Raa Raa" "a rather listenable track", and said "Annonda Pattu" is "vintage Rajni, and gets your feet tapping. One can almost picture Rajni brandishing his trademark cigarette and sunglasses as he gyrates to the beat. If one is a die-hard Rajni fan, then one is likely to go beserk [sic] dancing to this." R. Rangaraj of Chennai Online wrote "However, the music score is just about average, given the massive hype and expectations. Vidyasagar is a gifted composer but has apparently felt cramped by the tailor-made songs that a Rajni film demands of him". Singer Charulatha Mani, writing for The Hindu called the song "Konjam Neram", which was based on the Sriranjani raga, an "attractive take on the raga" and said the song "is contemporary in feel and traditional at the roots".

== Track listing ==
Chandramukhi (Original Motion Picture Soundtrack) track listing – Tamil version
| No. | Title | Lyrics | Singer(s) | Length |
|---|---|---|---|---|
| 1. | "Devuda Devuda" | Vaali | S. P. Balasubrahmanyam | 5:16 |
| 2. | "Konjam Neram" | Yugabharathi | Asha Bhosle, Madhu Balakrishnan | 4:29 |
| 3. | "Athinthom" | Pa. Vijay | S. P. Balasubrahmanyam, Vaishali | 4:34 |
| 4. | "Kokku Para Para" | Na. Muthukumar | Tippu, Manikka Vinayagam, Rajalakshmee Sanjay, Ganga Sitharasu | 4:52 |
| 5. | "Annanoda Pattu" | Kabilan | KK, Karthik, Sujatha Mohan, Chinnaponnu | 5:25 |
| 6. | "Raa Raa" | Bhuvana Chandra | Binni Krishnakumar, Tippu | 5:19 |
| Total length: | | | | 29:51 |

Chandramukhi (Original Motion Picture Soundtrack) track listing – Telugu version
| No. | Title | Lyrics | Singer(s) | Length |
|---|---|---|---|---|
| 1. | "Devuda Devuda" | Bhuvana Chandra | S. P. Balasubrahmanyam | 5:12 |
| 2. | "Chiluka Pada Pada" | Suddala Ashok Teja | Tippu, Manikka Vinayagam, Rajalakshmee Sanjay, Ganga Sitharasu | 4:46 |
| 3. | "Andala Aakasamantha" | Suddala Ashok Teja | S. P. Balasubrahmanyam | 4:30 |
| 4. | "Konta Kalam" | Vennelakanti | Sujatha Mohan, Madhu Balakrishnan | 4:25 |
| 5. | "Annagari Mata" | Bhuvanachandra | Anuradha Sriram, Karthik | 5:15 |
| 6. | "Vaarai Naan Unnai Thedi" | Vaali | Nithyashree Mahadevan, Tippu | 5:19 |
| Total length: | | | | 29:37 |

== Accolades ==
Accolades for Chandramukhi (Original Motion Picture Soundtrack)
| Award | Category | Recipient | Result | Ref. |
|---|---|---|---|---|
| Filmfare Awards South | Best Female Playback Singer – Tamil | Binny Krishnakumar – ("Raa Raa") | Won | |
| Film Fans' Association Award | Best Lyricist | Vaali – ("Devuda Devuda") | Won | |
