= FEFSI Vijayan =

Indian film choreographer

Vijayan
- Born: Madras, Madras State, India
- Occupations: Stunt performer, Action director
- Children: Shabarish
- Parent: Swaminathan (father)

FEFSI Vijayan is an Indian action choreographer, stunt coordinator, actor who works in Telugu, Tamil, Malayalam and Hindi language films.

== Career ==
He has the record of being the youngest stunt master in the Indian film industry at the age of 22. He became a stunt man at the age of 17 due to family situation. He is the son of stunt choreographer Swaminathan who is known for composing Lion fight done by MGR in Adimai Penn. Swaminathan was a prominent fight master for MGR films and for that Vijayan had very close relationship with MGR. He was the president of the FEFSI and thus, earning him the nickname FEFSI Vijayan. His son, Shabarish is an actor who has starred in few films like Markandeyan (2011) and Pandi Oliperukki Nilayam (2012).

== Filmography ==
=== Telugu ===
- 1983 Roshagadu (credited as Vijay)
- 1983 Manthri Gari Viyyankudu (credited as Vijay)
- 1984 Bobbili Brahmanna
- 1985 Agni Parvatam
- 1985 Chattamtho Poratam (credited as Vijay)
- 1985 Donga
- 1985 Chiranjeevi
- 1985 Vajrayudham
- 1985 Adavi Donga
- 1985 Pattabhishekam
- 1986 Kondaveeti Raja
- 1986 Veta
- 1986 Khaidi Rudraiah
- 1986 Kaliyuga Pandavulu
- 1986 Apoorva Sahodarulu
- 1986 Chanakya Sapatham
- 1987 Collector Gari Abbai
- 1987 Sahasa Samrat
- 1987 Ajeyudu
- 1987 Bharatamlo Arjunudu
- 1987 Ramu
- 1987 Agni Putrudu
- 1988 Manchi Donga
- 1988 Aakhari Poratam
- 1988 Chinababu
- 1988 Brahma Puthrudu
- 1988 Aswaddhama
- 1988 Bandipotu
- 1988 Janaki Ramudu
- 1988 Yuddha Bhoomi
- 1988 Raktabhishekam
- 1988 Ugranetrudu
- 1989 Prema
- 1989 Bhale Donga
- 1989 Vicky Dada
- 1989 State Rowdy
- 1989 Ontari Poratam
- 1989 Rudranetra
- 1989 Black Tiger
- 1989 Agni
- 1989 Two Town Rowdy
- 1990 Kondaveeti Donga
- 1990 Bobbili Raja
- 1990 Lorry Driver
- 1991 Ramudu Kadhu Rakshasudu
- 1991 Talli Tandrulu
- 1991 Coolie No. 1
- 1991 Maha Yagnam
- 1991 Rowdy Alludu
- 1992 Dharma Kshetram
- 1992 Gharana Mogudu
- 1993 Kondapalli Raja
- 1993 Nippu Ravva
- 1994 Mugguru Monagallu
- 1995 Alluda Majaka
- 1995 Big Boss
- 1995 Pedarayudu
- 1996 Akkada Ammayi Ikkada Abbayi
- 1996 Soggadi Pellam
- 1998 Choodalani Vundi
- 1999 Iddaru Mitrulu
- 1999 Raja Kumarudu
- 2000 Vamsi
- 2001 Mrugaraju
- 2002 Takkari Donga
- 2003 Okkadu
- 2003 Gangotri
- 2003 Simhachalam
- 2003 Tagore
- 2004 Arjun
- 2004 Shankar Dada MBBS
- 2005 Balu
- 2005 Nuvvostanante Nenoddantana
- 2005 Subhash Chandra Bose
- 2005 Political Rowdy
- 2006 Pokiri
- 2006 Annavaram
- 2007 Desamuduru
- 2007 Sri Mahalakshmi
- 2007 Chirutha
- 2008 Bujjigadu
- 2010 Puli
- 2012 Krishnam Vande Jagadgurum
- 2013 Seethamma Vakitlo Sirimalle Chettu
- 2015 Dynamite
- 2016 Brahmotsavam
- 2017 Balakrishnudu

=== Tamil ===
- 1981 Meendum Kokila
- 1982 Sangili
- 2001 Dhill
- 2002 Baba
- 2003 Joot
- 2005 Sachein
- 2006 Unakkum Enakkum
- 2007 Pokkiri
- 2007 Azhagiya Tamil Magan
- 2009 Villu
- 2011 Markandeyan
- 2014 Vallavanukku Pullum Aayudham
- 2017 Indrajith
- 2018 Bhaskar Oru Rascal

=== Hindi ===
- 1985 Mahaguru
- 1986 Dharm Adhikari
- 1986 Muddat
- 1989 Rakhwala
- 1989 Kanoon Apna Apna
- 1993 Muqabla
- 1995 Haathkadi
- 1995 Ravan Raaj: A True Story
- 1996 Jung
- 2000 Bulandi
- 2009 Wanted
- 2010 Dabangg
- 2011 Bodyguard
- 2018 Bhaiaji Superhit

=== Malayalam ===
- 1981 Kolilakkam

=== Kannada ===
- 2010 Porki

== Actor ==
=== Tamil ===
- 2001 Dhill
- 2002 Baba
- 2002 Ivan
- 2002 Villain
- 2003 Anjaneya as Vettu Ramasamy
- 2003 Joot
- 2004 Aethiree
- 2004 Giri
- 2005 Sukran
- 2005 Daas
- 2006 Jambhavan
- 2006 Madrasi
- 2008 Vambu Sandai
- 2009 Villu
- 2009 Aadhavan
- 2015 Inimey Ippadithaan
- 2017 Muthuramalingam as Ramaiah
- 2019 Thadam
- 2019 Devarattam
- 2023 DD Returns
- 2026 Idhayam Murali
- 2026 Hi

=== Telugu ===
- 1983 Mantri Gari Viyyankudu
- 1988 Aakhari Poratam
- 1988 Yuddha Bhoomi
- 2003 Villain
- 2003 Tagore

== Director ==
=== Telugu ===
- 1991 Maha Yagnam - Telugu
- 2004 Naani - Telugu (Heroine Introduction Scene only)
- 2007 Sri Mahalakshmi - Telugu

=== Tamil ===
- 2011 Markandeyan - Tamil

== Television ==
Year	Shows	Role	Channel	Notes
2024-present	Top Cooku Dupe Cooku (season 1)	Contestant, Runner up	Sun TV	

== Awards ==
Filmfare Awards

- 2009: Filmfare Award for Best Action - Wanted
- 2010: Filmfare Award for Best Action - Dabangg

Nandi Awards

- 2001: Nandi Award for Best Fight Master - Bhadrachalam
- 2002: Nandi Award for Best Fight Master - Takkari Donga
- 2003: Nandi Award for Best Fight Master - Okkadu
- 2006: Nandi Award for Best Fight Master - Pokiri
- 2011: Nandi Award for Best Fight Master - Dookudu
