= Dr. Pal =

Indian American gastroenterologist

- Born: 15 November 1983 (age 42); Madurai, Tamil Nadu, India
- Education: MBBS, PSG Institute of Medical Sciences & Research; MPH, University of Massachusetts Boston; Residency, (Internal Medicine), Wayne State University School of Medicine
- Occupation: Gastroenterologist
- Known for: Media personality, stand-up comedy, health advocacy
- Medical career
- Profession: Medical doctor, health advocate, stand-up comedian
- Field: Medicine
- Sub-specialties: Gastroenterology

YouTube information
- Channel: DrPal
- Subscribers: 3.94 million
- Views: 1,985,786,064
- Last updated: September 16, 2026
- Website: drpalmanickam.com

Palaniappan Manickam (born 15 November 1983), better known as Dr. Pal, is an Indian American gastroenterologist, stand-up comedian, and social media personality currently setting up a clinic in India. He specializes in gut health, and time-restricted eating. He is also a celebrity doctor who uses in-person and virtual stand-up comedy ("MedCom") to educate the general public on chronic illness intervention.

== Early life and education ==
Palaniappan Manickam was born on 15 November 1983 in Madurai, Tamil Nadu, India. He received his MBBS from PSG Institute of Medical Sciences & Research in Coimbatore, India, his MPH from University of Massachusetts Boston, and his residency in Internal Medicine from Wayne State University School of Medicine in Michigan. He did his gastroenterology fellowship at Beaumont Hospital, Royal Oak.

== Career ==
Manickam is a gastroenterologist in Sacramento, California and uses a form of stand-up comedy he calls "MedCom," on social media and in person in order to educate the public on gut health and chronic illness intervention. His fans fondly refer to him as "Gutman", a portmanteau of Batman.He is serving as Director of preventive Gastroenterology, California.

Manickam made his first video in March 2020 during the COVID-19 pandemic. He notes that it "all started when an NGO got in touch with me saying they wanted a video for Covid awareness. I agreed and prepared a 10-minute script in four hours. They saw the video and wrote back to me saying this was very comical and that they wanted a professional video. I was gutted because I had spent a lot of time writing the jokes. They suggested I upload it to YouTube." Manickam followed through and created a YouTube channel, uploading the video. He then shared the video with a WhatsApp group that he belonged to, and the video went viral. He subsequently developed his YouTube channel, and created channels on other social media outlets such as Instagram.

While the initial content of his videos focused on COVID-19, it gradually shifted to gut-health, time-restricted eating, mostly plant-based diets, and weight loss. Manickam also began to study the genre of stand-up comedy, and invented the character "Saravana Kumar" as a means of connecting with his audience. He eventually began to perform his "medcom" routines in live stand - up performances in the United States, India, and Malaysia.

Manickam says that his comedic videos and live performances are his form of giving back, as all funds collected from his media outlets go towards Aishwaryam Trust, Madurai (a foundation which offers Palliative care).

== Honors ==
In 2024, Rediff.com listed Manickam as one of "India's Top Social Media Influencers."

== Personal life ==
His wife Vishnupriya "Priya" lives in Chennai, India with their children Arjun and Adharvaa. Dr. Pal is preparing to set up a clinic there.
