= Chaitra Reddy =

Indian actress

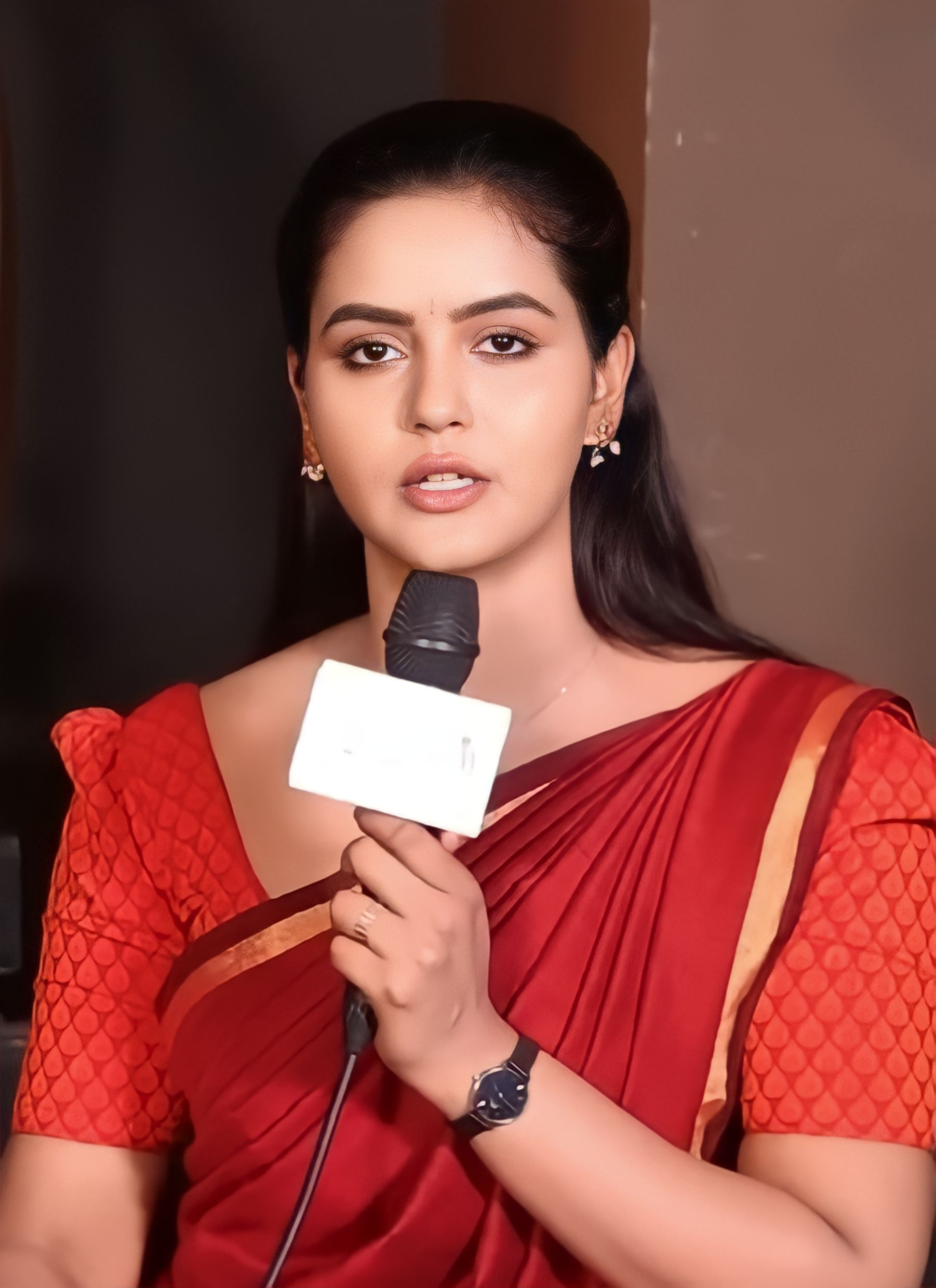
- Reddy in interview
- Born: Chaitra Latha Reddy; 23 July 1995 (age 31); Bangalore, Karnataka
- Occupation: Actress
- Years active: 2014–present
- Spouse: Rakesh Samala

YouTube information
- Channel: Chaitra Reddy
- Years active: 2022–present
- Subscribers: 1.32 Million
- Views: 625 Million
- Last updated: 4 August 2026

Chaitra Reddy is an Indian actress, who mainly works in the Kannada and Tamil languages. She made her Sandalwood debut in Rugged. She is mainly known for her role in the Kayal serial (2021).

== Life and career ==
Chaitra started her acting career in Kannada Television Industry with the Avanu Mathe Shravani serial, where she played the lead role of Shravani in 2014. She debuted in Kannada film Rugged in 2019, directed by Mahesh Gowda. In 2022, she gained attention for her role as Latha in the movie Valimai.

== Filmography ==
=== Films ===
Year	Name	Role	Language	Notes	Ref
2019	Rugged	Nandini	Kannada		
2022	MRP	Nandini	Kannada	Film debut as lead actress	
2022	Valimai	Latha	Tamil	Supporting Role	
2022	Vishamakaran	Tarangini	Tamil	Lead Role	

=== Television ===
Year	Name	Role	Language	Notes	Ref
2014-2016	Avanu Mathe Shravani	Shravani	Kannada	TV Debut as a lead actress	
2016-2017	Kalyanam Mudhal Kadhal Varai	Priya	Tamil	Lead Role; Replaced actress Priya Bhavani Shankar	
2017-2021	Yaaradi Nee Mohini	Swetha	Tamil	Negative Role	
2019-2020	Subhadra Parinayam	Subhadra	Telugu	Lead role	
2021–2026	Kayal	Kayalvizhi Muthuvel	Tamil	Lead role	
2023	Maaya Thotta	Maya	Tamil	Lead role	
2024	Ranjithame (Season 3)	Contestant	Tamil	Winner	
2024	Top Cooku Dupe Cooku (season 1)	Contestant	Tamil	2nd Runner Up	
