= K. K. Nishad =

Indian playback singer

- Origin: Kozhikode, Kerala, India
- Genres: Playback Singer, Carnatic music
- Occupation: Playback Singer
- Instrument: Vocals
- Years active: 2001–present

K. K. Nishad is an Indian playback singer from Kozhikode, Kerala, India. He started his career in 2002 as a playback singer in the Malayalam movie Nakshathrakkannulla Rajakumaran Avanundoru Rajakumari.

== Career ==
Prior to becoming a musician, he was a Guest Lecturer at the Devagari St. Josephs College, Kozhikode. He is a post-graduate in Mathematics.

Nishad debuted as a playback singer in 2002 with the song "Manassukal Thammil [Puthooram] ..." in Rajasenan's Malayalam film Nakshathrakkannulla Rajakumaran Avanundoru Rajakumari under music director Benny Kannan. It was followed by Swapnam Kondu Thulabharam.

== Discography ==
=== As composer ===
Year	Song	Album	Lyrics	Music	Co-singers
2021	Mahar Thannu Mayakkiyente...	Mahar	Sathianarayanan Payyannur	K. K. Nishad	K. K. Nishad, Sithara Krishnakumar
2022	Kunju Kanavukal...	Kurumbanz	Sathianarayanan Payyannur	K. K. Nishad	Adithya Nishad, Adithya Harikrishnan, Ayaan Nishad
2022	Malayirangi Varunnunde...	Kaadu	Sathianarayanan Payyannur	K. K. Nishad	K. K. Nishad, Chithra Arun, Malavika, Henniza

=== As singer ===
Year	Song	Film	Lyrics	Music	Co-singers
2016	Kanavin Kanimala Kayari	Pallikkoodam	Hari Narayanan	Tej Mervin	
2015	Govinda ...	Chakravyooham	Rafi Mathira	S Thaman	Ajay Warrier
2013	Ottaykku Paadunna [M] ...	Nadan	Madhu Vasudevan	Ouseppachan	
2012	Aadaadum ...	Kunjaliyan	BR Prasad	MG Sreekumar	Akhila Anand, Sreenath
2011	Naattuvazhiyorathe ...	Gaddaama	Rafeeq Ahamed	Bennett, Veetrag	
2011	Kaanakombil ...	Violin	Rafeeq Ahamed	Bijibal	Elizabeth Raju
2011	Anuraaga Then ...	Vaadaamalli	Vayalar Sarathchandra Varma	Shyam Balakrishnan	Surmukhi Raman
2011	Neeyo puzhapoleyen ...	Vaadaamalli	Vayalar Sarathchandra Varma	Shyam Balakrishnan	Neetha Subhir
2010	Oh Vaname ...	Pulliman	Kaithapram	Sharreth	
2010	Pranayanilaavinte ...	Oru Naal Varum	Murukan Kattakkada	MG Sreekumar	Preethi Warrier
2010	Evideyaanu Nee ...	Varan	Siju Thuravoor	Mani Sharma	
2009	Karmanye ...	Passenger		Bijibal	
2009	Entethaakumpol ...	Ayyo Paavam	Siju Thuravoor	GV Prakash Kumar	
2009	Priyathame ...	Ayyo Paavam	Siju Thuravoor	GV Prakash Kumar	
2009	Oru Chembakappon ...	Simhakutty (Gangothri 2003)	Siju Thuravoor	M. M. Keeravani	
2008	Aalolam Kanmani [M] ...	Raathrimazha	Kaithapram	Ramesh Narayan	
2008	Paalapoovithalil ...	Thirakkadha	Rafeeq Ahamed	Sharreth	
2006	Mayangippoyi [M] ...	Nottam	Kaithapram	M. Jayachandran	
2005	Manchaadikkompilinnoru Maina Paadi ...	Lokanaathan IAS	Kaithapram	M. Jayachandran	
2005	Salaam Salaam ...	Sarkar Dada	Gireesh Puthenchery, BR Prasad	M. Jayachandran	Afsal, Ganga
2005	Kallu pattu ...	Sarkar Dada	Gireesh Puthenchery, BR Prasad	M. Jayachandran	Alex Kayyalaykkal
2005	Omane ...	Boy Friend	RK Damodaran	M. Jayachandran	Sujatha Mohan
2004	Kandu Kandu [M] ...	Mampazhakkalam	Gireesh Puthenchery	M. Jayachandran	
2004	Pachakkilipadu ...	Kanninum Kannaadikkum	S. Ramesan Nair	M. Jayachandran	
2003	Pookkulayenthi ...	Varum Varunnu Vannu	Yusufali Kechery	Ouseppachan	
2003	Ormakale ...	Swapnam Kondu Thulabharam	S. Ramesan Nair	Ouseppachan	
2001	Kalarikkum ...	Nakshathrakkannulla Rajakumaran Avanundoru Rajakumari	S. Ramesan Nair	Benny Kannan	
2001	Manassukal Thammil [Puthooram] ...	Nakshathrakkannulla Rajakumaran Avanundoru Rajakumari	S. Ramesan Nair	Benny Kannan	
