= Samayal Samayal with Venkatesh Bhat =

- Logo
- Also known as: Venkatesh Bhat
- Genre: Cooking
- Presented by: Venkatesh Bhat
- Original languages: Kannada, Tulu, Tamil
- No. of seasons: 3 Season 01-02: (143); Season 03: (47)
- No. of episodes: S1-S2: 134; S3: 47

Production
- Running time: approx. 40-45 minutes per episode
- Production company: Media Masons

Original release
- Network: STAR Vijay
- Release: 30 August 2014 – 30 June 2018

Samayal Samayal with Venkatesh Bhat is a 2014 Indian Tamil-language cooking show featuring chef Venkatesh Bhat cooking 100 of his top recipes, that home cooks and viewers can try. The program focuses on what have been described by Times of India as "exciting recipes, especially South Indian" cuisine.

The show premiered on 30 August 2014 and 30 June 2018 for 190 episodes, airs on Vijay TV every Saturday at 2pm, with repeat episodes sometimes aired at varying times. As of 2016, the show has completed 100 episodes.

== Show format ==
The show features Venkatesh Bhat sharing his experience and knowledge with cooking techniques, and demonstrating 100 hand picked recipes from his cookbook. The show also features various celebrities, including stars from other Vijay TV television programs such as Saravanan Meenatchi. Cook With Comali

The format of the show changed from the earlier version of the show entitled Samayal Samayal, which aired on Vijay TV in 2001 for half an hour on Sundays at 1pm. The format of that version featured both Sharmila and Venkatesh Bhat, and filming was before a live audience who participated in the show.

== Seasons overview ==
Series	Episodes	Originally released		Time
Series	Episodes	First released	Last released	Time
1&2	143	30 August 2014	22 July 2017	Saturday; 2:00PM (IST)
3	47	29 July 2017	30 June 2018	Saturday; 1:00PM (IST)

== Chef Bhat ==
The presenter of the show, Venkatesh Bhat, is both a chef and CEO. He comes from the Udupi-Mangalore belt. Notwithstanding Bhat being a strict vegetarian, Bhat is also proficient at non-vegetarian cooking.

Bhat studied catering at Asan Memorial, and obtained a graduate degree from Cornell University and majored in general management in his studies at National University of Singapore, Singapore. Bhat initially worked in the kitchens of Hotel Chola Sheraton in 1994. Two years later, he moved to Taj Coromandel as a management trainee in hotel operations and kitchen management before being promoted to the position of sous chef in 1998. In 2001, Bhat joined Leela Palace in Bangaluru as an executive sous chef and was promoted to corporate chef by 2004. Bhat quit corporate life in 2007 to become an entrepreneur, before launching several brands and restaurants including South Indies, Up South, and Bon South.

Bhat later joined Accord Metropolitan, as well as Accord Puducherry, and Highland Hotel in Ooty. During the daytime, he is a CEO of the hotels. During the evenings, he is a chef, and focuses on the hotel's Royal Indianaa restaurant which serves South Indian cuisine, as well as the hotel's other eateries including Pergola, the Zodiac Bar and the brick oven. In 2019, with Chef Damodharan, he judges Cooku with Comali. In 2024, he was the judge of the Tamil cooking show Top Cooku Dupe Cooku alongside Chef Rammohan and the carnatic singer Binny Krishnakumar.

== List of episodes ==
No.	Title	Special guest	Original release date
1	"Opening Episode of the Season"	TBA	30 August 2014
2	"Indo Western Recipes"	TBA	6 September 2014
3	"Recipes Using Fish"	TBA	13 September 2014
4	"Recipes With Fruits"	TBA	20 September 2014
5	"Navratri Special"	TBA	27 September 2014
6	"Italian Special Episode"	TBA	4 October 2014
7	"Kerala Cuisine"	TBA	11 October 2014
8	"Tamil Nadu Cuisine"	TBA	18 October 2014
9	"Breakfast Dishes"	TBA	25 October 2014
10	"Andhra Cuisine"	TBA	1 November 2014
11	"Kabab Special"	TBA	8 November 2014
12	"Indian Sweets Special"	TBA	15 November 2014
13	"Culinary Lessons for Bachelors"	TBA	22 November 2014
