= Super Singer Junior season 11 =

Season of Indian music competition TV series

Super Singer Junior
- Season 11
- Hosted by: Ma Ka Pa Anand; Priyanka Deshpande
- Judges: K.S. Chithra; ~~Anuradha Sriram~~; D. Imman; Manjari (Indian singer)

Release
- Original network: Star Vijay
- Original release: 9 May 2026 – November 15, 2026

Season chronology
- ← Previous; Season 10 Next → Season 12

Super Singer Junior Season 11, the eleventh season of the Indian Tamil-language music competition reality television show Super Singer Junior. Ma Ka Pa Anand and Priyanka Deshpande return as hosts. And the judging panel consists of three judges: Anuradha Sriram, K.S. Chithra, and D. Imman. Due to some reasons, like concerts and other busy schedule, Anuradha Sriram didn't continue as judge till last. So, singer Manjari replaced her as judge.

The series judges the children between the ages of six and 15 on the basis of their voice quality, musical and singing talent. Contestants progress to the mega Blind auditions and will select the top 20 contestants who will compete on the main show. Sathya Spreading Happiness (more commonly known as "Sathya") is the sponsor for this season.

It premiered on Star Vijay on 9 May 2026, and airs on Saturday and Sunday at 18:30 and streams digitally on JioHotstar. The Grand Finale of Super Singer Junior Season 11 happened live on 15 November 2026.

In the Grand Finale, Denin Berno emerged as the title winner and got ₹60 Lakh apartment from DAC Developer in the season and Aryan secured 1st Runner-up and got ₹10 Lakhs each (One by DAC & Another by Star Vijay Team), and Sarveshvaran emerged as the 2nd Runner-up of the season and got ₹5 Lakhs, Laya Karthik emerged as 3rd Runner-up and got ₹3 Lakhs, Jeanna emerged as the 4th Runner-up and got ₹3 Lakhs in the season and Melodiyan emerged as 5th Runner-up and got ₹3 Lakhs. Denin Berno also won the VBJ Golden voice of the season and got golden mike trophy and 10 Lakhs from VBJ Jewellers.

== Production ==
Season 11 began on 9 May 2026, as scheduled. An Audition promo was released on Star Vijay's social media platforms. The show is a competition where the top contestants will be teamed with 2 judges' teams: either Team Anuradha/Manjari or Team D. Imman, and singer K.S. Chithra would judge all the top 20 contestants.

== Judges ==
| Judges | |
|---|---|
| K. S. Chithra | Playback singer in Malayalam, Tamil, Telugu, Kannada and Hindi music industry. She has also judged in Super Singer Junior 9, Super Singer Junior 3, Super Singer Junior 2, Super Singer Junior 1, and Star Singer. |
| ~~Anuradha Sriram~~ | Playback and classical singer. |
| Manjari | Indian playback singer and Hindustani vocalist.Her first stage performance was with Shiva, the Kolkata - based rock band, when she was in class eight. |
| D. Imman | National award-winning music composer for Tamil cinema. Imman has composed more than 80 films mainly in Tamil films. |

== Hosts ==
| Host | Notes |
|---|---|
| Makapa Anand | Indian television presenter, host and actor. He predominantly works in Tamil television and film industry. |
| Priyanka Deshpande | Indian television presenter, host and actress. She predominantly works in Tamil television and film industry. |

== Contestants ==
| # | Name | Episode entered | Status |
|---|---|---|---|
| 1 | Denin Berno | Episode 01 | Winner |
| 1 | Denin Berno | Episode 01 | VBJ GOLDEN VOICE OF THE SEASON |
| 2 | Aryan | Episode 01 | 1st Runner-up |
| 3 | Sarveshvaran | Episode 01 | Eliminated |
| 3 | Sarveshvaran | Episode 47 | 2nd Runner-up |
| 4 | Laya Karthik | Episode 01 | Eliminated |
| 4 | Laya Karthik | Episode 50 | 3rd Runner-up |
| 5 | Jeanna | Episode 01 | 4th Runner-up |
| 6 | Melodiyan | Episode 01 | Eliminated |
| 6 | Melodiyan | Episode 48 | 5th Runner-up |
| 7 | Deepa Varshana | Episode 01 | Eliminated |
| 8 | Sourabi | Episode 01 | Eliminated |
| 9 | Sarvesh | Episode 01 | Eliminated |
| 10 | Vishnu | Episode 01 | Eliminated |
| 11 | Srinidhi | Episode 01 | Eliminated |
| 12 | Bephina | Episode 01 | Eliminated |
| 13 | Sravana | Episode 01 | Eliminated |
| 14 | Shree Vardhini | Episode 01 | Eliminated |
| 15 | Sejal | Episode 01 | Eliminated |
| 16 | Ponnisri | Episode 01 | Eliminated |
| 17 | Mithran | Episode 01 | Eliminated |
| 18 | Rohitha | Episode 01 | Eliminated |
| 19 | Vinu Vardhan | Episode 01 | Eliminated |
| 20 | Vaishnavan | Episode 01 | Eliminated |

== Ticket to Finale ==
Three rounds will be conducted as RACE TO FINALE. Each Contestants will be given a golden belt for golden buzzer, which 2 Contestants are taking 2 golden belt will be awarded with TICKET TO FINALE.

| # | Name | Round 1 | Round 2 | Round 3 | Result |
|---|---|---|---|---|---|
| 1 | Aryan | Golden Buzzer | No buzzer | No buzzer | Failed |
| 2 | Deepa Varshana | Golden Buzzer | No buzzer | No buzzer | Failed |
| 3 | Denin Berno | Golden Buzzer | No buzzer | Golden Buzzer | 2nd Finalist |
| 4 | Jeanna | Golden Buzzer | Golden Buzzer | 1st Finalist | |
| 5 | Laya Karthik | No buzzer | No buzzer | Golden Buzzer | Failed |
| 6 | Melodiyan | Golden Buzzer | No buzzer | No buzzer | Failed |
| 7 | Sarvesh | Golden Buzzer | No buzzer | No buzzer | Failed |
| 8 | Sarveshvaran | No buzzer | Golden Buzzer | No buzzer | Failed |
| 9 | Sourabi | No buzzer | No buzzer | No buzzer | Failed |
| 10 | Vishnu | No buzzer | No buzzer | Golden Buzzer | Failed |

CELEBRATING ISAI (Ticket to Finale-3)

| Sr.no | Name | Result | Status |
|---|---|---|---|
| 1 | Aryan | Golden Buzzer | 3rd Finalist |
| 2 | Deepa Varshana | No buzzer | Failed |
| 3 | Laya karthik | Golden Buzzer | Failed |
| 4 | Melodiyan | Golden Buzzer | Failed |
| 5 | Sarvesh | No buzzer | Failed |
| 6 | Sarveshwaran | Golden Buzzer | Failed |
| 7 | Sourabi | Golden Buzzer | Failed |
| 8 | Vishnu | Golden Buzzer | Failed |

Wildcard Round

Srinidhi and Bephina returned as Wildcard Contestants to participate and to make their chances to reach finale alive and rest of the Contestants in top 10.

| Sr.no | Name | Result | Status |
|---|---|---|---|
| 1 | Bephina | No buzzer | Failed |
| 2 | Deepa Varshana | Golden Buzzer | Failed |
| 3 | Laya Karthik | Golden Buzzer | Failed |
| 4 | Melodiyan | Golden Buzzer | 5th Finalist |
| 5 | Sarvesh | Golden Buzzer | Failed |
| 6 | Sarveshwaran | Golden Buzzer | 4th Finalist |
| 6 | Srinidhi | Golden Buzzer | Failed |
| 7 | Saurabi | Golden Buzzer | Failed |
| 8 | Vishnu | No buzzer | Failed |

Wildcard Round 2

Srinidhi returned as Wildcard Contestant to participate and to make their chances to reach finale alive and rest of the Contestants who got golden buzzer in top 10.

| Sr.no | Name | Result | Status |
|---|---|---|---|
| 1 | Deepa Varshana | Golden Buzzer | Failed |
| 2 | Laya Karthik | Golden Buzzer | 6th Finalist |
| 3 | Sarvesh | Golden Buzzer | Failed |
| 4 | Srinidhi | No buzzer | Failed |
| 5 | Saurabi | No buzzer | Failed |
| 6 | Vishnu | Golden Buzzer | Failed |

== Finalists ==
| S.no | Contestants | Finalist | Status |
|---|---|---|---|
| 1 | Jeanna | 1st Finalist | 4th Runner-up |
| 2 | Denin Berno | 2nd Finalist | Winner |
| 3 | Aryan | 3rd Finalist | 1st Runner-up |
| 4 | Sarveshwaran | 4th Finalist | 2nd Runner-up |
| 5 | Melodyan | 5th Finalist | 5th Runner-up |
| 6 | Laya Karthik | 6th Finalist | 3rd Runner-up |

== Grand Finale ==
=== Grand Finale Performance ===
There are 2 rounds in which the 6 finalists will participate and who score high marks and more votes from the audience the Winner, Runner-up and so on position will be given. The order of contestants are arranged in the order of Finalist.

Episode 54: Round 1

| Air Date | Contestant | Song | Film |
|---|---|---|---|
| 15 November 2026 | Jeanna | | |
| 15 November 2026 | Denin Berno | | |
| 15 November 2026 | Aryan | | |
| 15 November 2026 | Sarveshvaran | | |
| 15 November 2026 | Melodiyan | | |
| 15 November 2026 | Laya karthik | | |

Episode 54: Round 2

| Air Date | Contestant | Song | Film |
|---|---|---|---|
| 15 November 2026 | Jeanna | | |
| 15 November 2026 | Denin Berno | | |
| 15 November 2026 | Aryan | | |
| 15 November 2026 | Sarveshvaran | | |
| 15 November 2026 | Melodiyan | | |
| 15 November 2026 | Laya kathik | | |
