= Trident Arts =

Indian motion picture company (1987)

- Type: Private
- Industry: Film
- Founded: 1987
- Founders: R. Ravindran
- Headquarters: Chennai, Tamil Nadu, India
- Products: Film production, distribution
- Website: tridentarts.in

Trident Arts is an Indian film production and distribution company based in Chennai, Tamil Nadu. It was established in 1987 by R. Ravindran. Since then, it has produced and distributed several Tamil films.

== History ==
Trident Arts was set up by R. Ravindran in 1987. Since then it has distributed several Tamil films in region wise in Tamil Nadu, then moved to a major distributor with the movies including Vikram Vedha, Tamizh Padam 2, Ratsasan, Seethakaathi, Dhilluku Dhuddu 2, Viswasam, Kadaram Kondan & Leo (2023 Indian film). The company has produced films including Shivalinga, Lakshmi and Action. Its latest release was Kasada Thapara, released on 27 August 2021 in SonyLIV. The company's next productions are Enna Solla Pogirai, directed by A. Hariharan, starring Ashwin Kumar and Avantika Mishra, Hostel, directed by Sumanth Radhakrishnan, starring Ashok Selvan and Priya Bhavani Shankar, and Shot Boot 3, directed by Arun Vaidyanathan, starring Venkat Prabhu and Sneha.

== Filmography ==
=== Productions and major distributions ===
†	Denotes films that have not yet been released

Year	Title	Director	Production	Distribution
2016	Vetrivel	Vasantha Mani	✓	
2017	Shivalinga	P. Vasu	✓	
2017	Vikram Vedha	Pushkar–Gayathri		✓
2017	Sakka Podu Podu Raja	G. L. Sethuraman		✓
2017	Aramm	Gopi Nainar		✓
2018	Mercury	Karthik Subbaraj		✓
2018	Tamizh Padam 2	C. S. Amudhan		✓
2018	Pyaar Prema Kaadhal	Elan		✓
2018	Lakshmi	A. L. Vijay	✓	✓
2018	Ratsasan	Ram Kumar		✓
2018	Seethakaathi	Balaji Tharaneetharan		✓
2019	Mitta	D. P. Pradeep	✓	
2019	Dhilluku Dhuddu 2	Rambhala		✓
2019	Boomerang	R. Kannan		✓
2019	Airaa	Sarjun KM		✓
2019	Vellai Pookal	Vivek Elangovan		✓
2019	Auto Shankar	Ranga Yali	✓	
2019	Devi 2	A. L. Vijay	✓	✓
2019	Kadaram Kondan	Rajesh M. Selva		✓
2019	Sixer	Chachi	✓	✓
2019	Aruvam	Sai Sekhar	✓	✓
2019	Action	Sundar C	✓	✓
2021	Kasada Thapara	Chimbu Deven	✓	✓
2022	Enna Solla Pogirai	A. Hariharan	✓	
2022	Hostel	Sumanth Radhakrishnan	✓	
2023	Malikappuram	Vishnu sasi shankar		✓
2023	Ayothi	R. Manthira Moorthy	✓	
2023	Leo	Lokesh Kanagaraj		✓
2023	Annapoorani: The Goddess of Food	Nilesh Krishnaa	✓	
2024	Vadakkupatti Ramasamy	Karthik Yogi		✓
2024	Nandhan	Era. Saravanan		✓
2025	Indra	Sabarish Nanda		✓
2026	Heartin	Kishore Kumar	✓	
2026	Circle	A. L. Vijay	✓	
2026	Ram and Leela	Ramachandrran Kannan	✓	

=== Major region wise distributions ===
- Aan Paavam (1985)
- Amman Kovil Kizhakale (1986)
- Enga Ooru Pattukaran (1987)
- Arul Tharum Ayyappan (1987)
- Namma Ooru Nayagan (1988)
- Karakattakkaran (1989)
- Pongi Varum Kaveri (1989)
- Pudhu Vasantham (1990)
- Pandithurai (1992)
- Chinna Thayee (1992)
- Periya Gounder Ponnu (1992)
- Meera (1992)
- Sinna Mapplai (1993)
- Ezhai Jaathi (1993)
- Ulle Veliye (1993)
- Chinna Muthu (1994)
- Aranmanai Kaavalan (1994)
- Honest Raj (1994)
- Duet (1994)
- Ilaignar Ani (1994)
- Chutti Kuzhandhai (1995)
- Villadhi Villain (1995)
- Chakravarthy (1995)
- Vishnu (1995)
- Ayudha Poojai (1995)
- Maaman Magal (1995)
- Ullathai Allitha (1996)
- Mettukudi (1996)
- Parambarai (1996)
- Tata Birla (1996)
- Gopala Gopala (1996)
- Mettukudi (1996)
- Poomani (1996)
- Dharma Chakkaram (1997)
- Iruvar (1997)
- Mannava (1997)
- Thaali Pudhusu (1997)
- Vallal (1997)
- Ganga Gowri (1997)
- Porkaalam (1997)
- Vasuke (1997)
- Janakiraman (1997)
- Rettai Jadai Vayasu (1997)
- Porkaalam (1997)
- Kadhalukku Mariyadhai (1997)
- Poonthottam (1998)
- Moovendhar (1998)
- Kondattam (1998)
- Paattali (1999)
- Kannupada Poguthaiya (1999)
- Kallazhagar (1999)
- Nee Varuvai Ena (1999)
- Sethu (1999)
- Velai (1998)
- Vaettiya Madichu Kattu (1998)
- Rathna (1998)
- Aval Varuvala (1998)
- Poonthottam (1998)
- Thayin Manikodi (1998)
- Desiya Geetham (1998)
- Guru Paarvai (1998)
- Anantha Poongatre (1999)
- Poovellam Kettuppar (1999)
- Nee Varuvai Ena (1999)
- Ooty (1999)
- Thirunelveli (2000)
- Mugavaree (2000)
- Kakkai Siraginilae (2000)
- Sandhitha Velai (2000)
- James Pandu (2000)
- Vallarasu (2000)
- Veeranadai (2000)
- Vetri Kodi Kattu (2000)
- Koodi Vazhnthal Kodi Nanmai (2000)
- Vanna Thamizh Pattu (2000)
- Manu Needhi (2000)
- Vetri Kodi Kattu (2000)
- Pennin Manathai Thottu (2000)
- Vaanchinathan (2001)
- Poovellam Un Vasam (2001)
- Alli Thandha Vaanam (2001)
- Thavasi (2001)
- Vaalee (2001)
- Citizen (2001)
- Azhagi (2002)
- Red (2002)
- Charlie Chaplin (2002)
- Thamizh (2002)
- Sundhara Travels (2002)
- Samasthanam (2002)
- Villain (2002)
- April Maadhathil (2002)
- Gummalam (2002)
- Jaya (2002)
- Mounam Pesiyadhe (2002)
- Julie Ganapathi (2003)
- Kadhal Sadugudu (2003)
- Arasu (2003)
- Punnagai Poove (2003)
- Parthiban Kanavu (2003)
- Thennavan (2003)
- Three Roses (2003)
- Anjaneya (2003)
- Pudhukottaiyilirundhu Saravanan (2004)
- Gambeeram (2004)
- Kuthu (2004)
- Jana (2004)
- Chellamae (2004)
- Bose (2004)
- Neranja Manasu (2004)
- Chatrapathy (2004)
- Aai (2004)
- Meesai Madhavan (2004)
- Devathaiyai Kanden (2005)
- Kannadi Pookal (2005)
- Arinthum Ariyamalum (2005)
- Englishkaran (2005)
- Kundakka Mandakka (2005)
- Adhu Oru Kana Kaalam (2005)
- Thirupaachi (2005)
- Sachein (2005)
- Ji (2005)
- Pattiyal (2006)
- Perarasu (2006)
- Varalaru (2006)
- Vattaram (2006)
- Em Magan (2006)
- Aalwar (2007)
- Muni (2007)
- Bheemaa (2008)
- Kaalai (2008)
- Pirivom Santhippom (2008)
- Vaazhthugal (2008)
- Muniyandi Vilangial Moonramandu (2008)
- Subramaniapuram (2008)
- Kuruvi (2008)
- Villu (2009)
- Innoruvan (2009)
- Sarvam (2009)
- Maasilamani (2009)
- Naadodigal (2009)
- Renigunta (2009)
- Vettaikaaran (2009)
- Singam (2010)
- Angadi Theru (2010)
- Kanchana (2011)
- Sadhurangam (2011)
- Poraali (2011)
- Mouna Guru (2011)
- Oru Nadigaiyin Vaakkumoolam (2012)
- Thadaiyara Thaakka (2012)
- Krishnaveni Panjaalai (2012)
- Murattu Kaalai (2012)
- Sundarapandian (2012)
- Settai (2013)
- Samar (2013)
- Puthagam (2013)
- Haridas (2013)
- Kutti Puli (2013)
- Ainthu Ainthu Ainthu (2013)
- Arrambam (2013)
- Thagaraaru (2013)
- Thillu Mullu (2013)
- Goli Soda (2014)
- Inga Enna Solluthu (2014)
- Pannaiyarum Padminiyum (2014)
- Vanavarayan Vallavarayan (2014)
- Poojai (2014)
- Kaadu (2014)
- Anjaan (2014)
- Lingaa (2014)
- Kaththi (2014)
- Sandamarutham (2015)
- Visaranai (2015)
- Naanum Rowdy Dhaan (2015)
- Paayum Puli (2015)
- Aambala (2015)
- Yennai Arindhaal (2015)
- Papanasam (2015)
- Romeo Juliet (2015)
- Maari (2015)
- Orange Mittai (2015)
- Paayum Puli (2015)
- 49-O (2015)
- Inji Iduppazhagi (2015)
- Kathakali (2016)
- Rajinimurugan (2016)
- Tharai Thappattai (2016)
- Visaranai (2016)
- Jil Jung Juk (2016)
- Miruthan (2016)
- Sethupathi (2016)
- Pugazh (2016)
- Valeba Raja (2016)
- Narathan (2016)
- Jithan 2 (2016)
- Enakku Innoru Per Irukku (2016)
- Amma Kanakku (2016)
- Appa (2016)
- Jackson Durai (2016)
- Dhilluku Dhuddu (2016)
- Nambiyaar (2016)
- Vaaimai (2016)
- Achcham Yenbadhu Madamaiyada (2016)
- Saithan (2016)
- Enakku Vaaitha Adimaigal (2017)
- Vanamagan (2017)
- Gemini Ganeshanum Suruli Raajanum (2017)
- Vizhithiru (2017)
- Bairavaa (2017)
- Mersal (2017)
- Richie (2017)
- Aval (2017)
- Annadurai (2017)
- Sakka Podu Podu Raja (2017)
- Balloon (2017)
- Gulaebaghavali (2018)
- Mannar Vagaiyara (2018)
- Bhaskar Oru Rascal (2018)
- Diya (2018)
- Nadigaiyar Thilagam (2018)
- Raja Ranguski (2018)
- Chekka Chivantha Vaanam (2018)
- Aan Devathai (2018)
- Vada Chennai (2018)
- Thimiru Pudichavan (2018)
- K.G.F: Chapter 1 (Tamil) (2018)
- Maari 2 (2018)
- Viswasam (2019)
- Vantha Rajavathaan Varuven (2019)
- 90 ML (2019)
- Thadam (2019)
- Super Deluxe (2019)
- Lisaa (2019)
- Gurkha (2019)
- Biskoth (2020)
- Eeswaran (2021)
- Parris Jeyaraj (2021)
- Kamali from Nadukkaveri (2021)
