= Super Singer Junior season 10 =

Super Singer Junior
- Season 10
- Super Singer Junior 10
- Hosted by: Ma Ka Pa Anand; Priyanka Deshpande; Angelin; Lakshmi Priya
- Judges: K.S. Chithra; Mano; D. Imman
- Winner: Gayathri
- No. of episodes: 47

Release
- Original network: Star Vijay
- Original release: 16 November 2024 – 25 May 2025

Season chronology
- ← Previous; Season 9 Next → Season 11

Super Singer Junior Season 10, the tenth season of the Indian Tamil-language music competition reality television show Super Singer Junior, aired on Star Vijay and streams digitally on Disney+ Hotstar. Ma Ka Pa Anand and Priyanka Deshpande return as hosts. Later Mahanadhi series fame actress Lakshmi Priya joined the sets as an anchor upon the exit of Priyanka.

The series judges the children between the ages of six and 15 on the basis of their voice quality, musical and singing talent. Judges for the season include composer D. Imman, and playback singers K.S. Chithra and Mano.

The Grand Finale of Super Singer Junior 10 was held on 25th May 2025. At the finals, Gayathri (from a family of six generations of musicians) won this season. It was held in the presence of Kamal Haasan and A.R.Rahman, who presented the awards.

== Judges ==
Judges	Description
K. S. Chithra	Playback singer in Malayalam, Tamil, Telugu, Kannada and Hindi music industry. She has also judged in Super Singer Junior 9, Super Singer Junior 3, Super Singer Junior 2, Super Singer Junior 1, and Star Singer.
Mano	Playback singer in Malayalam, Tamil, Telugu, Kannada and Hindi music industry.
D. Imman	National award-winning music composer for Tamil cinema. Immanel has composed more than 80 films mainly in Tamil films.

== Contestants ==
#	Name	Hometown	Status	Awards
1	Gayathri	Theni	5th Finalist	Winner (1st place)
2	Nasreen	Ranipet	3rd Finalist	1st Runner up (2nd place)
3	Sarasuruthi	Chennai	2nd Finalist	2nd Runner up (3rd place)
4	Aadhya	Chennai	1st Finalist	2nd Runner up (3rd place)
5	Lynet	Chennai	4th Finalist	3rd Runner up(4th place)
6	Priyanha	Jaffna	Top 10	-
7	Joshika	Namakkal	Top 10	-
8	Aadhanasree	Coimbatore	Top 10	-
9	Layavarshini	Chennai	Top 10	-
10	Ridhan	Coimbatore	Top 10	-
11	Thanumitha	Tiruvannamalai	Eliminated	-
12	Sarvesh	Chennai	Eliminated	-
13	Fiona	Tirunelveli	Eliminated	-
14	Vishnu	Pudukkottai	Eliminated	-
15	Mrithika	Chennai	Eliminated	-
16	Medha	Kochi	Eliminated	-
17	Pranesh	Coimbatore	Eliminated	-
18	Renuka	Salem	Eliminated	-
19	Hemashri	Pondicherry	Eliminated	-
20	Sathvika	Chennai	Eliminated	-
21	Sri Varshini	Chennai	Special Performer	-

== Episodes ==
Episode Number	Air Date(s)	Round Name	Prize winners (weekly)	Special Guest(s) & Judge(s)
1	16 November 2024	Grand Launch	None	Super Singer Junior 9 contestants
2	17 November 2024	Grand Launch	None	Super Singer Junior 9 contestants
3	23 November 2024	En kural en kathai	None	Super Singer Junior 9 contestants
4	24 November 2024	En kural en kathai	None	Super Singer Junior 9 contestants
	31 November 2024			
	1 December 2024			

== Stage Performances ==
=== Grand Launch (episodes 1 and 2) ===
Name of contestant(s)	Name of song	Lyricist	Name of Film/Album	Singer(s)	Composer(s)
Renuka	Raasave Unna Nambi	Vairamuthu	Muthal Mariyathai	S. Janaki	Ilaiyaraaja
Pranesh	Namma Kada Veedhi	Gangai Amaran	Amman Kovil Kizhakale	S. P. Balasubrahmanyam	Ilaiyaraaja
Ridhan	Whistle Podu	Madhan Karky	The Greatest of All Time	Vijay, Venkat Prabhu, Premgi Amaren	Yuvan Shankar Raja
Aadhanasree	Kangal Edho	Yugabharathi	Chithha	Pradeep Kumar, Karthika Vaidyanathan	Dhibu Ninan Thomas
Nasreen	Oru Kili Uruguthu	Vairamuthu	Aanandha Kummi	S. Janaki, S. P. Sailaja	Ilaiyaraaja

=== En Kural En Kathai (episodes 3 and 4) ===
Name of contestant(s)	Name of song	Lyricist	Name of Film/Album	Singer(s)	Composer(s)
LayaVarshini	Sollamalae Yaar Parthathu	Palani Bharathi	Poove Unakkaga	Sujatha Mohan, P. Jayachandran	S. A. Rajkumar
Nasreen	Poovarasampoo Poothachu	Gangai Amaran	Kizhakke Pogum Rail	S. Janaki	Ilaiyaraaja

== Finale Winners ==
The Grand Finale of Super Singer Junior 10 was held on 25th May 2025 in Chennai.

- Gayathri was announced the Title Winner of Super Singer Junior Season 10 by Kamal Haasan.
- Nasreen was announced as the first runner-up of Super Singer Junior Season 10 by A.R.Rahman.
- Aadhya and Sarasuruthi were credited as the second runner-up of Super Singer Junior Season 10 by A.R.Rahman
