= Annapoorani: The Goddess of Food =

2023 Indian Tamil drama film by Nilesh Krishnaa

- Theatrical release poster
- Directed by: Nilesh Krishnaa
- Screenplay by: Nilesh Krishnaa; Prasanth S.
- Story by: Nilesh Krishnaa
- Dialogues by: Nilesh Krishnaa; Arul Sakthi Murugan
- Produced by: Jatin Sethi; R. Ravindran
- Starring: Nayanthara; Jai; Sathyaraj; Achyuth Kumar
- Cinematography: Sathyan Sooryan
- Edited by: Praveen Anthony
- Music by: Thaman S
- Production companies: Zee Studios; Naad Studios; Trident Arts
- Release date: 1 December 2023
- Running time: 146 minutes
- Country: India
- Language: Tamil
- Box office: ₹5.70 crore

Annapoorani: The Goddess of Food is a 2023 Indian Tamil-language drama film directed by Nilesh Krishnaa in his directorial debut and jointly produced by Jatin Sethi and R. Ravindran under Zee Studios, Naad Sstudios and Trident Arts. The film stars Nayanthara in the title role of her milestone 75th movie, alongside Jai, Sathyaraj and Achyuth Kumar. It follows Annapoorani, who aspires to become a chef, but faces numerous obstacles while trying to fulfill her dream.

The film was officially announced in July 2022, with the tentative title Nayanthara 75, as it is Nayanthara's 75th film in the lead role, while the title of the film was announced in October 2023. Principal photography commenced in April 2023 in Chennai along with a schedule held in Tiruchirappalli and wrapped by mid-September 2023. The film has music composed by Thaman S, cinematography handled by Sathyan Sooryan and editing by Praveen Anthony.

Annapoorani was released in theatres on 1 December 2023, received mixed to negative reviews from critics and underperformed at the box office. After its streaming debut on Netflix, the film elicited accusations of promoting love jihad and hurting Hindu sentiments, resulting in it being taken down from Netflix worldwide.

== Plot ==
In Tiruchirappalli, Annapoorani is an aspiring chef who wants to pursue a degree in hotel management and climb the ladder to become a corporate chef like her idol, Chef Anand Sundarajan. Her family's lineage has been dedicated to serving at the Srirangam temple, where her father cooks the food offered to devotees as prasadam. The family being Hindu Brahmins, eats only vegetarian food. Annapoorani's father refuses to let her be in a room where meat is served and cooked, let alone pursuing a degree where she is forced to handle meat.

However, Annapoorani remains steadfast in her decision to be a chef and secretly joins a hotel management course at the same university where her parents believe she is doing an MBA. She is then caught one day by her father, eating chicken, and is then forced into a matrimonial alliance. On the day of her wedding, she runs away with her friend Farhaan to Chennai, leaving a voice note for her family. Angered, her father smashes the phone after listening to it. Annapoorani starts living with Farhaan's family, learns cooking from his mother and gets acquainted with Islam, even praying the namaz before she starts cooking. She then manages to get a job at the same hotel where her idol works and strives to be the best possible chef. She impresses the visiting president of France and is promoted to Chef de cuisine.

Anand's son Ashwin, also a chef, slowly grows jealous of Annapoorani and sabotages her by staging an oven accident leading to her acquiring Ageusia, and her taste buds becoming inactive. Through hard work, she manages to train to be the best chef in India and manages to win despite losing her sense of taste.

== Cast ==
- Nayanthara as Annapoorani Rangarajan (voice dubbed by Deepa Venkat)
  - Ovi Bhandarkar as young Annapoorani
- Jai as Farhaan, Annapoorani's classmate and love interest
- Sathyaraj as Chef Anand Sundarajan
- Achyuth Kumar as Rangarajan, Annapoorani's father (Voice by Jayaprakash)
- K. S. Ravikumar as 'Arusuvai' Annamalai
- Karthik Kumar as Chef Ashwin Sundarrajan, Anand's son
- Renuka as Saradha, Annapoorani's mother
- Sachu as Subbulakshmi Paati, Annapoorani's grandmother
- Redin Kingsley as Chinto Chin, Annapoorani's classmate and friend
- Suresh Chakravarthy as Chef Suman
- Parvathi T as Basheer's mother
- Poornima Ravi as Keerthi, Annamalai's daughter and Annapoorani's classmate and friend
- Chef RK as Chef Raju Karthikeyan
- TSR Srinivasan as Chef Vadamaalai
- Baby Samyuktha as young Keerthi
- Som Shekhar as Santhosh
- Mohamed Irfan as a YouTuber
- Priyadarshini Rajkumar as Keerthi's houseowner
- Thidiyan as Chef
- Jagan Krishnan as Audience Member

== Production ==
=== Development ===
On 12 July 2022, Zee Studios, Naad SStudios and Trident Arts announced their jointly produced film, with Nilesh Krishnaa in his directorial debut, and Nayanthara in the lead role. It was tentatively titled as Nayanthara 75. Krishnaa previously was a co-writer for Shankar, co-writing films such as 2.0 (2018) and Indian 2. The film marks Nayanthara's first film in the lead role after her wedding to Vignesh Shivan in June 2022. The same month, Jai, Sathyaraj and Redin Kingsley were cast for supporting roles, with the former reuniting with Nayanthara after Raja Rani (2013).

On 8 April 2023, cinematographer Sathyan Sooryan, music composer Thaman S, editor Praveen Anthony and art director Durairaj were announced being part of the crew. The same day, Redin Kingsley, Suresh Chakravarthy and Renuka were announced being part of the cast. Krishnaa revealed that, during the COVID-19 pandemic, he narrated the script of the film during a phone call to Nayanthara. He further revealed that he wrote the script with her in mind. He further announced that K. S. Ravikumar and Achyuth Kumar were part of the cast, with the latter playing the role of Nayanthara's character's father. On 25 October, the title Annapoorani was announced through a promotional video. It is a reference to the Hindu goddess of food, Annapurna.

=== Filming ===
Principal photography commenced on 9 April 2023, with the first schedule in Chennai. Filming began with the blessings from the actor Rajinikanth. Within three days, the schedule concluded. After a short break, the second schedule began by mid-April in Tiruchirappalli. Filming wrapped by 16 September.

== Music ==
The music and background score is composed by Thaman S, in his fourth collaboration with Nayanthara after Anjaneyulu (2009), Greeku Veerudu (2013), and Godfather (2022). The audio rights for the film were acquired by Saregama. The first single "Ulagai Vella Pogiraal" was released on Nayanthara's 39th birthday (18 November 2023), and the second single "Life Is On" was released on 23 November 2023.

Track listing
No.	Title	Lyrics	Singer(s)	Length
1.	"Ulagai Vella Pogiraal"	Vivek	Harini	3:04
2.	"Life Is On" (Version 1 – Veg)	Vivek	B. Harshini Nethra, V.M. Shreenitha, Colorvedi Gokul, V. Shivathmika	3:25
3.	"Life Is On" (Version 2 – Non-Veg)	Vivek	B. Harshini Nethra, V.M. Shreenitha, Colorvedi Gokul, V. Shivathmika	3:12
4.	"Ivalo Ivalo"	Vivek	Punya Selva, V. Shivathmika	2:31
5.	"Aduppil Pogai Aagum"	Vivek	Deepti Suresh	2:55
6.	"Maula Mera Maula"	Shyam Renganathan	Sandilya Pisapati	4:13
Total length:				19:20

== Release ==
=== Theatrical ===
Annapoorani was released in theatres on 1 December 2023.

=== Home media ===
The post-theatrical streaming rights of the film were bought by ZEE5, and the satellite rights by Zee Tamil. However, the streaming rights were later changed to Netflix. The film began streaming on Netflix from 29 December 2023, but was taken down a month later. Since then, the film is only officially available for viewing on Simply South, a streaming service that does not legally work in India. The Hindi dubbed version began streaming on JioHotstar from 1 October 2025.

== Reception ==
=== Box office ===
Annapoorani: The Goddess of Food earned ₹60 lakh (equivalent to ₹65 lakh or US$70,000 in 2026) on the opening day. A month after its release, Janani K of India Today described the film as a box office failure, attributing its underperformance to the effects of Cyclone Michaung.

=== Critical response ===
Annapoorani: The Goddess of Food received mixed reviews from critics.

Janani K of India Today rated the film 2.5 out of 5 stars, saying it "could have been more delectable had it focused on selected ideas instead of feeling the need to force-feed messages on many topics." M. Suganth of The Times of India rated the film 3 out of 5, saying "Nayanthara uses her screen presence to make us root for Annapoorani and her superstardom to spell out the messages of women empowerment that the film wants to convey."

Raisa Nasreen of Times Now rated the film 3 out of 5, saying "Nayanthara's Culinary Triumph Unveiled In Feast of Tradition, Aspiration And Comedy." Akchayaa Rajkumar of The News Minute rated the film 3.5 out of 5, saying "Despite its imperfect politics and occasional logical fallacies, Annapoorani makes for a refreshing watch, reminiscent of the wholesome, slice-of-life Tamil films before the era of big guns, ear-shattering explosions, and blood spill."

P. Sangeetha of OTTPlay rated the film 2.5 out of 5, saying "Nayanthara's Annapoorani: The Goddess of Food falls short of becoming a delectable spread due to its weak writing and long-drawn screenplay. A one-time watch." Avinash Ramachandran of Cinema Express rated the film 2.5 out of 5, stating "For a film based on food, it is disappointing that Annapoorani doesn't have those mouthwatering frames that make us hungry. The background score and songs by Thaman are too coercive and scream 'empowerment' a bit too vehemently. While I get what the makers were going for with the animated portions in the film, it didn't come across, and it was as distracting as the increased use of the green screen in many scenes."

== Controversy ==
The film elicited controversy after its Netflix release, with activist Ramesh Solanki and the Hindutva organisation Vishva Hindu Parishad filing an FIR against the streaming company and the filmmakers for promoting love jihad and for hurting the feelings of the Brahmin community. The complaint also alleged that the film made inaccurate remarks on the Hindu deity Rama being a meat-eater. Following the controversies, the film was taken down by Netflix worldwide. Filmmakers such as R. Parthiban, Vetrimaaran and Pa. Ranjith questioned the veracity of the complaints to take down the film, while other celebrities criticised Netflix for yielding to pressure from "fringe elements". On 18 January, Nayanthara apologised for the controversy over the film saying she and her team did not intend to hurt anyone's sentiments.
