= Aditi Gautam =

Indian model and actress

- Born: 20 July; Mumbai, India
- Occupations: Model; Actress
- Spouse: Mickhaill Palkhivala

Aditi Gautam, also credited as Seiya Gautam, is an Indian model turned actress known for her work in Telugu and Hindi language films. Aditi made her Telugu cinema debut with the 2008 film Neninthe and her Hindi cinema debut with the 2018 film Sanju.

== Filmography ==
Year	Film	Role	Language	Notes	Ref.
2008	Neninthe	Sandhya	Telugu	credited as Siya Gautham	
2010	Vedam	Zara	Telugu	credited as Siya Gautham	
2011	Double Decker	Ganga	Kannada	credited as Siya Gautham	
2018	Sanju	Priya Dutt	Hindi		
2022	Pakka Commercial	Saira Banu aka Amulya	Telugu		
2024	Srikakulam Sherlock Holmes	Constable Lakshmi	Telugu	credited as Siya Gowtam	
TBA	Pilavani Perantam	TBA	Telugu	Delayed	

=== Streaming television ===
Year	Title	Role	Network	Language	Notes	Ref.
2023	Athidhi	Sandhya	Disney+ Hotstar	Telugu		
