= Srikakulam Sherlock Holmes =

2024 Indian Telugu-language film

- Theatrical release poster
- Directed by: Writer Mohan
- Written by: Writer Mohan
- Produced by: Vennapusa Ramana Reddy; Lasya Reddy (Presenter)
- Starring: Vennela Kishore; Ananya Nagalla; Siya Gowtam; Sneha Gupta; Raviteja Mahadasyam; Prabhakar
- Cinematography: Mallikarjun Naragani
- Edited by: Avinash Gurlink
- Music by: Sunil Kashyap; Gyanni
- Production company: Sri Ganapathi Cinemas
- Release date: 25 December 2024
- Country: India
- Language: Telugu

Srikakulam Sherlock Holmes is a 2024 Indian Telugu-language comedy thriller film, written and directed by Writer Mohan in his directorial debut. Produced by Vennapusa Ramana Reddy under the banner of Sri Ganapathi Cinemas, the film stars Vennela Kishore in the titular role, alongside Ananya Nagalla, Siya Gautam, Sneha Gupta, Ravi Teja Mahadasyam, Prabhakar, and Muralidhar Goud.

The film's tagline, "Chantabbai Thaluka" ("Care of Chantabbai"), serves as a tribute to the 1986 detective comedy Chantabbai starring Chiranjeevi. Srikakulam Sherlock Holmes is released on 25 December 2024.

== Plot ==
On 20 May 1991, Rajiv Gandhi visits Vizag before traveling to Sriperumbudur, where he is assassinated on 21 May. On the same day, a young woman named Pulidandu Mary is found murdered on Vizag Beach. Amid public and media pressure, CI Bhaskar challenges a journalist, vowing to apprehend the murderer within a week or resign from his position. Concurrently, the arrival of a senior officer investigating the Rajiv Gandhi assassination case forces Bhaskar to delegate Mary's murder investigation to a private detective, Om alias Sherlock Holmes, with a strict deadline of one week.

Holmes is assisted by Constable Lakshmi as he delves into the case. His investigation identifies seven suspects: Balu, a telephone booth operator; Bhrama, an employee at a home for disabled children; a suspended police officer; a woman named Jhansi; and three fishermen. Holmes systematically interrogates each suspect, piecing together the events leading to Mary's murder.

As the investigation progresses, Holmes unravels the motives and uncovers the identity of the murderer. The film also explores why Holmes chose to become a detective and the circumstances that led to Mary's death, ultimately revealing the truth.

== Cast ==
- Vennela Kishore as Om alias Sherlock Holmes
- Ananya Nagalla as Bhrama
- Siya Gowtam as Constable Lakshmi
- Sneha Gupta
- Ravi Teja Mahadasyam as Balu
- Prabhakar as suspended police officer
- Muralidhar Goud as Michael Raj
- Bhadram as Lingam
- Anish Kuruvilla as CI Bhaskar
- Naga Mahesh
- Mach Ravi
- Prabhavati
- Sangita
- Subhodayam Subbarao
- Shivam Malhotra
- Sasikumar Rajendran

== Production ==
=== Development ===
Writer Mohan, known for his collaborations with filmmakers such as E. V. V. Satyanarayana, Posani Krishna Murali, and Jeevitha, ventured into direction with Srikakulam Sherlock Holmes. A native of Guntur, Mohan drew from his familiarity with Srikakulam district, gained during his travels through the district with Jeevitha and Rajasekhar during political campaigns. The film incorporates regional themes, particularly the Srikakulam accent, which plays a significant role in conveying both the comedic and emotional aspects of the story. Mohan explained that the accent was not used merely for comedic effect but also to enhance the characters' emotional depth.

The narrative combines a fictional detective storyline with real events surrounding the assassination of former Prime Minister Rajiv Gandhi. Set in 1991, the plot examines the connection between Rajiv Gandhi's visit to Visakhapatnam and his subsequent assassination in Sriperumbudur. Against this historical backdrop, the story explores a series of smaller, interrelated events, presented through the perspective of a fictional detective character.

At the first look launch event, Writer Mohan revealed that the movie centres around three main characters—Sharmilamma, Lokanatham, and Om Prakash—whose names are creatively abbreviated as "Sher," "Lok," and "Home," aligning with the film's title.

Before production commenced, producer Ramana Reddy reportedly shared the story with 70 individuals, who found its twists and developments unpredictable. To ensure the title resonated with rural audiences unfamiliar with Sherlock Holmes, the tagline “Chantabbai Thaluka” (“Care of Chantabbai”) was added. This tagline served as a nod to Chiranjeevi’s 1986 detective comedy Chantabbai while “Thaluka” referenced Pawan Kalyan’s association with the Pithapuram constituency.

=== Casting ===
Vennela Kishore stars as a private detective, assisted by his parents. The character’s parents wanted him to become a police officer, but he chose private investigation instead. Kishore and much of the cast, hailing from Telangana, worked hard to learn the Srikakulam accent.

Kishore, promoted as the lead of Srikakulam Sherlock Holmes, was reportedly not intended to be the protagonist when production began. Reports suggest the screenplay was altered during post-production to elevate his character to the titular role without his knowledge. Dissatisfied with this change, Kishore reportedly distanced himself from the film's promotions, expressing concerns about how his role was portrayed.

The film features Siya Gautam in a pivotal role as a police constable. Anish Kuruvilla, initially cast as a police officer, had his voice replaced during post-production to align with the character’s intensity and accent. Despite this, Kuruvilla supported the filmmakers’ decision. The supporting cast includes Prabhakar and Muralidhar Goud in significant roles.

=== Filming ===
Srikakulam Sherlock Holmes was primarily filmed in Nellimarla in Vizianagaram district, Bheemili in Visakhapatnam district, and Ramoji Film City. Set in the 1990s, the production team faced challenges recreating the period look. Specific locations were chosen to authentically reflect the era, according to the director.

== Music ==
The music of Srikakulam Sherlock Holmes is composed by Sunil Kashyap and Gyanni, with lyrics written by Ramajogayya Sastry, Purnachary and Kasarla Shyam.

Track list
No.	Title	Lyrics	Music	Singer(s)	Length
1.	"Ma Ooru Srikakulam"	Ramajogayya Sastry	Sunil Kashyap	Mangli
2.	"Preminchane Pilla"	Purnachary	Sunil Kashyap	Rahul Sipligunj
3.	"Sakuntalakkayya"	Kasarla Shyam	Sunil Kashyap	Uma Neha

== Release ==
The first look of Srikakulam Sherlock Holmes was unveiled on 8 January 2024, by 24 Telugu film directors at an event attended by producer Dil Raju as the chief guest. The first motion poster for the film was released on 30 May 2024, followed by the teaser on 28 November 2024. The official trailer premiered on 17 December 2024. The film is being distributed by Vamsi Nandipati, known for his previous distribution work on films such as Ka (2024), Maa Oori Polimera 2 (2023), and Committee Kurrollu (2024).
