= Chantabbai =

1986 Telugu comedy film by Jandhyala

- Movie Poster
- Directed by: Jandhyala
- Written by: Jandhyala
- Based on: Chantabbai by Malladi Venkata Krishna Murthy
- Produced by: Bheemavarapu Buchi Reddy
- Starring: Chiranjeevi; Suhasini; Jaggayya
- Cinematography: Lok Singh
- Edited by: Gowtham Raju
- Music by: K. Chakravarthy
- Production company: Jyothi Art Pictures
- Release date: 22 August 1986
- Running time: 134 min
- Country: India
- Language: Telugu

Chantabbai (transl. The little chap) is a 1986 Indian Telugu-language comedy drama film directed by Jandhyala, starring Chiranjeevi and Suhasini, with Jaggayya and Mucherla Aruna in supporting roles. Based on Malladi Venkata Krishna Murthy's novel of the same name, the film features music composed by K. Chakravarthy.

Released on 22 August 1986, Chantabbai received critical acclaim but was commercially unsuccessful. Despite its initial box office performance, the film later achieved cult status and is regarded as a classic in Telugu comedy cinema.

== Plot ==
Panduranga "Pandu" Rao is an amateur detective employed at Universal Detective Agency in Visakhapatnam, which is run and managed by Ramachandra Murthy. He considers James Bond as his idol, and models himself after him in terms of appearance and gives himself the name "James Pond". Neither the police nor his colleagues take Pandu seriously, including his assistant Ganapathi and the local police inspector Saumitri. Pandu harbours feelings for Jwala, a self-employed telephone cleaner. She considers him as a good friend, but does not take his professional abilities seriously.

Once, Jwala visits the house of a businessman to clean his telephone, but finds herself holding a hand gun instead of telephone receiver. She is accused of killing the businessman and theft of diamonds he possessed. Pandu takes up the case, but is interrupted by Murthy, who was appointed by the police to help them as a detective. Pandu refuses to give up and continues to investigate unofficially. Meanwhile, Jwala's friend Nischala, a surgeon, arranges her release on bail.

As a part of his investigation, Pandu calls Jwala to his office for an interrogation, which goes horribly wrong. However, Pandu gets to know that Jwala spotted a chocolate brown-coloured Maruti car parked outside the businessman's house on the day of murder. He notices Murthy using a similar car and contacting jewellers outside Visakhapatnam. Pandu grows suspicious, and spies on Murthy with Saumitri's help. They eventually catch Murthy confessing his crime to a jeweller and arrest him. Pandu is subsequently appointed as the head of Universal Detective Agency.

Upon Jwala's recommendation, Nischala approaches Pandu with a case: to find her missing paternal half-brother who was nicknamed Chantabbai (younger one). Chantabbai was born to Nischala's father Gangadharam and his love interest Sarmishta. Gangadharam was later coerced to marry Nischala's mother, who managed to keep them apart until her demise. With Gangadharam's health deteriorating severely, Nischala wants to bring Chantabbai before him and make him happy.

Pandu takes up the case and finds that Gangadharam's friend Ramkoti took care of Sarmistha and Chantabbai for a while. Upon investigating, Pandu learns that Ramkoti had two sons Kalyan and Pattabhi, and favoured the former. Pandu concludes that Kalyan is Gangadharam's son and introduces him to the family. Days later, Pattabhi comes to Gangadharam's house and claims to be Chantabbai.

Pandu finds himself challenged with the outcome and tries several ways to deduce the real heir. All of them fail due to several loopholes, but the results of a blood test manipulated by both makes Pandu believe that both of them are fraudsters. Gangadharam expels both from his house, and the brothers swear revenge. Meanwhile, Pandu and Jwala fall in love and plan for their marriage.

One day, Pandu learns from Nischala that Chantabbai's aunt Bala has arrived in Visakhapatnam for a family function. Pandu goes to meet Bala and learns that his mother was the Sharmistha whom Gangadharam loved. Realising that he is Chantabbai, Pandu recalls the hardships he faced as a child and how he was ostracized by the society for his illegitimate birth. Pandu refuses to return to Gangadharam's place as his son, unless the share of wealth he would inherit be donated to the orphanage he runs in the city. Nischala agrees to the condition and mediates.

Meanwhile, Kalyan and Pattabhi kidnap Pandu and demand ransom from Gangadharam. Pandu sends a letter explaining his plight and requests to save him. However, Ganapathi notices number '1' written on the sheet and starts reading the first letter of each word in the message together; they reveal an instruction to tell the kidnappers that he is not the real heir of Gangadharam.

Gangadharam executes the plan, and Pandu leads the brothers to a house. There, they notice Gangadharam playing cards with his friend, and proceed to kidnap him. However, Saumitri enters and arrests the brothers. The film ends with Gangadharam accepting Pandu as his son, and his marriage with Jwala.

== Cast ==
- Chiranjeevi as Panduranga Rao "James Pond" / Chantabbai
  - K. Rajesh as young Chantabbai
- Suhasini as Jwala
- Mucherla Aruna as Dr. Nischala
- Suthivelu as Ganapathi, Pandu's assistant
- Allu Aravind as Pandu's assistant
- Jaggayya as A. Gangadharam, Nischala's father
- Raavi Kondala Rao as Pandu's Boss
- Bheema Raju as Inspector Saumitri
- Allu Ramalingaiah as Kodandam, Jwala's father
- Sakshi Ranga Rao as Krishna Murthy, a deaf man
- Sri Lakshmi as Vagdevi
- Chandra Mohan as Kalyan
- Sudhakar as Pattabhi
- Suthi Veerabhadra Rao as Bhattu, Cook
- Dham as Dama
- Potti Prasad as Newspaper editor
- Viswanatham
- Jayalalita as Nurse
- Dubbing Janaki
- Brahmanandam
- Ali (comedian) as one of the students in school

== Music ==
All lyrics are written by Veturi; all music is composed by K. Chakravarthy.

Track listing
No.	Title	Singer(s)	Length
1.	"Utharana Levandi Dhruva Nakshatram"	S. P. Balasubrahmanyam, S.P. Sailaja	4:32
2.	"Atlanti Itlanti Heroni Kanu"	S. P. Balasubrahmanyam, P. Susheela	3:59
3.	"Nenu Neekai Puttinanani"	S. P. Balasubrahmanyam, P. Susheela	4:40
4.	"Nenu Prema Pujari"	S. P. Balasubrahmanyam, P. Susheela	4:19

== Reception ==
Although Chantabbai did not fare well at the box office upon its release, it later became a cult classic, praised for its humour and Chiranjeevi's comedic performance. Initially, audiences did not embrace the film, as it differed from Chiranjeevi's usual action-hero roles. However, it gained significant popularity in repeat television screenings, where it became a hit.

In 2016, Karthik Keramulu of Dailyo highlighted that the film was a casting coup, with Chiranjeevi—known for his action roles—playing a bumbling private detective in a full-length comedy.

== Legacy ==
The 2024 film Srikakulam Sherlock Holmes pays homage to Chantabbai with the tagline "Chantabbai Thaluka" ("Care of Chantabbai").
