= Athidhi (TV series) =

Indian horror thriller television series

- Promotional release poster
- Genre: Horror thriller
- Written by: Y. G. Bharath
- Directed by: Y. G. Bharath
- Starring: Venu Thottempudi; Avantika Mishra; Aditi Gautam
- Music by: Kapil Kumar
- Country of origin: India
- Original language: Telugu
- No. of seasons: 1
- No. of episodes: 6 (list of episodes)

Production
- Executive producer: Rohith Pisapati
- Producer: Praveen Sattaru
- Cinematography: Manojh Reddy Katasani
- Editor: Dharmendra Kakarala
- Running time: 30 minutes
- Production company: Hotstar Specials

Original release
- Network: Disney+ Hotstar
- Release: 19 September 2023

Athidhi (transl. The Guest) is an Indian Telugu-language horror thriller television series written and directed by Y. G. Bharath. Produced by Praveen Sattaru under the banner of Hotstar Specials, it stars Venu Thottempudi, Avantika Mishra and Aditi Gautam. It premiered from 19 September 2023 on Disney+ Hotstar.

== Cast ==
- Venu Thottempudi as Ravi / Raja Ravi Vardana Veera Varma
- Avantika Mishra as Maya
- Aditi Gautam as Sandhya
- Venkatesh Kakumanu as Savari, a YouTuber
- Ravi Varma as Prakash
- Bhadram as Raju, Tea seller
- Raghu Karumanchi as Harsha, a character from one of the two short stories narrated by Ravi
- Keshav Deepak as Music Teacher, a character from one of the two short stories narrated by Ravi

== Episodes ==
No.	Title	Directed by	Written by	Original release date
1	"Strange Beauty"	Y. G. Bharath	Y. G. Bharath	19 September 2023
2	"Two Short Stories"	Y. G. Bharath	Y. G. Bharath	19 September 2023
3	"The Murder"	Y. G. Bharath	Y. G. Bharath	19 September 2023
4	"Back & Forth"	Y. G. Bharath	Y. G. Bharath	19 September 2023
5	"Key Factor"	Y. G. Bharath	Y. G. Bharath	19 September 2023
6	"Arishadvarga"	Y. G. Bharath	Y. G. Bharath	19 September 2023

== Production ==
In September 2023, the series was announced by Disney+ Hotstar. Initially Upendra was the first choice for the role. Later, Venu Thottempudi, Avantika Mishra and Aditi Gautam were signed as the lead. The principal photography of the series commenced in 2022.

== Reception ==
Satya Pulagam of ABP Desam awarded the series 2.5/5 stars. Chatakonda Krishna Prakash of Hindustan Times gave the series 2.75/5 stars. Srivathsan Nadadhur of OTTPlay rated the series 2.5/5 stars.

== See also ==
- List of Disney+ Hotstar original programming
