= Meeku Meere Maaku Meme =

2016 Telugu film

- Directed by: Hussain Sha Kiran
- Written by: Hussain Sha Kiran
- Produced by: Nakama Planet Green studios
- Starring: Tarun Shetty; Avantika Mishra
- Cinematography: Surya Vinay
- Edited by: Marthand K. Venkatesh
- Music by: Shravan Bharadwaj
- Release date: 17 June 2016
- Running time: 126 minutes
- Country: India
- Language: Telugu

Meeku Meere Maaku Meme is a 2016 Telugu language film directed by Hussain Sha Kiran. It stars Tarun Shetty and Avantika Mishra.

== Cast ==
- Tarun Shetty as Aadi
- Avantika Mishra as Priya
- Swaraj Rebbapragada as Priya's father
- Kireeti Damaraju as Kireeti
- Jenny Honey
- Bharan Kumar

== Production ==
In a media interaction, Avantika Mishra stated that she played a girl next door character named Tanu.

== Soundtrack ==
Meeku Meere Maaku Meme

Soundtrack album by Shravan Bharadwaj
- Released: 16 February 2016
- Genre: Feature film soundtrack
- Length: 25:26
- Language: Telugu
- Label: Geetha Arts
External audio
- Meeku Meere Maaku Meme – Jukebox on YouTube

The soundtrack was composed by Shravan Bharadwaj.

Track listing
| No. | Title | Lyrics | Singer(s) | Length |
|---|---|---|---|---|
| 1. | "Adugu Dooke" | Ramanjaneylu | Prakash | 3:47 |
| 2. | "Pone" | KK | Shravan Bharadwaj | 3:20 |
| 3. | "Tholi Tholi" | Sweccha | Sai Krishna, Shravya | 3:35 |
| 4. | "Cheliya" | Ramanjaneylu | Shravan Bharadwaj | 3:39 |
| 5. | "Em Maayo" | Sirish Satyavolu | Lalitha Kavya | 3:51 |
| 6. | "Uber Oohallo" | Sirish Satyavolu | Sai Krishna | 3:28 |
| 7. | "Meeku Meere Maaku Meme" | Sirish Satyavolu | Sirish Satyavolu, Manisha Satyavolu | 3:46 |
| Total length: | | | | 25:26 |

== Reception ==
A critic from The Times of India gave two-and-a-half out of five stars concluding it's easy-to-watch film. Srivathsan Nadadhur of The Hindu wrote, "Clean humour and natural performances make Meeku Meere Maaku Meme an enjoyable watch."
