= Maaya (2014 film) =

2014 romantic thriller film directed by Neelakanta

- Film poster
- Directed by: Neelakanta
- Written by: Neelakanta
- Produced by: Madhura Sreedhar Reddy; Dr. MVK Reddy
- Starring: Harshvardhan Rane; Avantika Mishra; Sushma Raj; Nandini Rai; Anita Choudary; Naga Babu
- Cinematography: P. Bal Reddy
- Edited by: Naveen Nooli
- Music by: Shekar Chandra
- Production company: Shirdi Sai Combines
- Distributed by: Multidimension Entertainments
- Release date: 1 August 2014
- Running time: 120 minutes
- Country: India
- Language: Telugu

Maaya is a 2014 Telugu psychological supernatural thriller film directed by Neelakanta and produced by Dr. M. V. K. Reddy, Madhura Sreedhar Reddy. It stars Harshvardhan Rane, Avantika Mishra, Sushma Raj and Nandini Rai in leading roles, with Anita Chowdary, Naga Babu, Venu and Jhansi featuring in pivotal roles. The film is based on ESP (Extra Sensory Perception).

The film was initially to be adapted in Hindi as Murder 4, a sequel to the classic erotic thriller series Murder.

== Plot ==
Meghana has a rare gift of extrasensory perception. At the age of 6, she has visions about her mother's death. However she is unable to save her. 15 years later, she is a journalist and lives with her father.

On a special assignment, she meets a known fashion designer, Siddharth Varma (Harshvardhan Rane). She likes his good nature and slowly begins to fall in love with him. Meanwhile she has a vision about the death of a security guard. She manages to save the guard's life with Siddharth's help. Then she tells her father about her visions. He consoles her and learns about her feelings for Siddharth. The next day, she meets her childhood friend Puja and learns that she and Siddharth are engaged. She feels that Siddharth intentionally hurt her feelings. Afterwards she has a vision of Siddharth slitting Puja's neck.

She tells this to her father and they consult a parapsychology about it. She notes that in reality of each vision, Meghana is present there and advises Meghana to observe Puja and Siddharth's relationship. She has another vision of a girl being electrocuted in a bathtub. She identifies the girl as Vaishali, Siddharth's former girlfriend. She learns that she is already dead in a car accident. She enquires about it and learns that Siddharth bribed some officials and got the case closed.

When she returns, Siddharth confronts her and tells her the truth. Vaishali was a social activist and they both were in love but Vaishali's conservative family objected to their marriage. Vaishali elopes with him and they go to his farmhouse. Siddharth hears her scream during her bath and finds her electrocuted. When he was taking her to hospital, they had an accident and he just bribed the officials to avoid any controversy. He became depressed over her death and then Puja started taking care of him. He engaged her because of his mother's urge. However, when he met Meghana, he got attracted to her due to her similarities to Vaishali and later fell in love with her.

The next day, Meghana gets a call from Puja to meet her. Puja tells her about Siddharth's changed behaviour and asks if she and Siddharth are together to which Meghana confesses. Puja tells her that she loved Siddharth since her childhood and she was the one who electrocuted Vaishali as she got furious about learning about her marriage to Siddharth. She tries to kill Meghana but Siddharth arrives there with a police official who is there to arrest Puja for Vaishali's murder. Puja shoots the officer and Siddharth slits her throat accidentally with a knife.

The movie ends with showing Meghana and Siddharth living married happily.

== Cast ==
- Harshvardhan Rane as Siddharth Varma
- Avantika Mishra as Meghana
- Sushma Raj as Puja
- Nandini Rai as Vaishali
- Anita Chowdary as Meghana's mother
- Naga Babu as Meghana's father
- Venu Yeldandi as Bujji, Meghana's colleague and cameraman
- Jhansi as psychiatrist
- Sivannarayana Naripeddi

== Production ==
The film was shot in Hyderabad and in and around Andhra Pradesh and Telangana. The official Trailer of the film was released on 13 June 2014.

== Soundtrack ==
Maaya

Studio album by Shekar Chandra
- Released: 1 July 2014
- Genre: Feature film soundtrack
- Length: 24 Minutes
- Language: Telugu
- Label: Madhura Audio

Shekar Chandra chronology
Pelli Pustakam (2013)	Maaya (2014)	Boochamma Boochodu (2014)

=== Track list ===
The soundtrack is composed by Shekar Chandra. Lyrics are penned by Balaji, Rama D and Sira Sri. Songs are as follows:

Track No	Song	Singer(s)
1	"Yem Chestunnava"	Sri Soumya Varanasi, Dinker Kalvala
2	"Pokiri Raja"	Sravana Bhargavi
3	"Enduko"	Ramya Behara
4	"Avunanna Kada Anna"	Sai Shivani, Dinker Kalvala
5	"Maaya"	Amala Chebolu
