= Double Decker (2011 film) =

- Directed by: Victory Vasu
- Screenplay by: Victory Vasu
- Story by: Anees Bazmee
- Produced by: Parimala Jaggesh; Farzana Khan; R Srinivasan
- Starring: Jaggesh; Shraddha Arya; Siya Gautham
- Cinematography: P. K. H. Das
- Edited by: K. M. Prakash
- Music by: Jayapaul
- Production company: Om Sri Lakshmi Narasimha Cine Productions
- Release date: 22 April 2011
- Country: India
- Language: Kannada

Double Decker is a 2011 Indian Kannada comedy film directed by Victory Vasu and starring Jaggesh, Shraddha Arya and Siya Gautham. The film is a remake of Govinda and Raveena Tandon starrer Hindi film, Sandwich and was released on 22 April 2011.

== Cast ==
- Jaggesh as Paramesh / Ganapa
- Shraddha Arya as Parvathi
- Siya Gautham as Ganga
- Cudavalli Chandrashekar
- Avinash
- Shobaraj as the police inspector
- Tennis Krishna as the film director
- Chidanand
- R. N. Sudarshan
- Sathyabhama as Paramesh's mother
- Bank Janardhan
- Master Junith Gowda
- Master Jeevith Gowda

== Soundtrack ==
Jayapaul has composed the soundtrack.

No.	Title	Singer(s)	Length
1.	"Darling Darling"	Srinivas
2.	"IPod Thara"	Sujith, Vijayaa Shanker
3.	"Tunta Tunta Hey Tunta"	Karthik, Vijayaa Shanker
4.	"Kanase Kanase Nanna Saviganase"	Anuradha Sriram, Shweta Mohan

== Reception ==
=== Critical response ===
A critic from The Times of India scored the film at 3.5 out of 5 stars and says "The rest is for the audience to enjoy. Shradha Arya and Siya Gautham have excelled in their roles. Tennis Krishna does a good job as a film director. Music by Purandar Jaipal and camera by P K H Das impress". B S Srivani from Deccan Herald wrote "Purandar Jaipal’s music is a pleasant surprise while PKH Das is his usual self. Prakash’s crisp editing cuts out superfluous stuff, leaving the viewers to enjoy this desi sandwich. Double Decker with its double entendres is a definite time pass on a muggy afternoon". A critic from NDTV wrote "Veteran actors Avinash, Shobharaj, Chandrashekhar have performed their roles with ease. P.K.H. Doss' camera work is really good, but the other technical aspects of the movie are just ordinary".
