= Enna Solla Pogirai =

2022 romantic comedy film

- Theatrical release poster
- Directed by: A. Hariharan
- Written by: A. Hariharan
- Produced by: R. Ravindran
- Starring: Ashwin Kumar Lakshmikanthan; Teju Ashwini; Avantika Mishra
- Cinematography: Richard M. Nathan
- Edited by: J. A. Mathivathanan
- Music by: Vivek–Mervin
- Production company: Trident Arts
- Release date: 13 January 2022
- Running time: 146 minutes
- Country: India
- Language: Tamil

Enna Solla Pogirai (transl. What are you going to say?) is a 2022 Indian Tamil-language romantic comedy film written and directed by A. Hariharan in his directorial debut. The film stars Ashwin Kumar Lakshmikanthan, Teju Ashwini and Avantika Mishra, with Pugazh, Delhi Ganesh, Subbu Panchu and Swaminathan in supporting roles. It was released on 13 January 2022.

== Plot ==
RJ Vikram is a carefree radio jockey who lives life according to his heart. Although he is satisfied with his career, he has never been in a romantic relationship due to his long list of expectations for a partner, which has led him to reject several brides chosen by his father, much to the frustration of his father and his close friend Chitti.

Vikram later meets Anjali through an arranged marriage proposal. Anjali is a well-known romantic novelist whose books have inspired many readers to fall in love. Ironically, despite writing successful love stories, she has never experienced love herself and prefers an arranged marriage. However, she wishes to marry a man who has previously been in a serious relationship.

During the bride-seeing ceremony at Anjali’s house, the two speak privately and develop a mutual liking for each other. When Anjali asks Vikram whether he has ever been in love, he lies and narrates a fictional story about a past relationship, even describing how he supposedly met his former lover. Delighted, Anjali agrees to the proposal, and Vikram reciprocates as he is also impressed by her.

Later, Anjali tells Vikram that she is struggling to find inspiration for her next novel. Fascinated by the love story he narrated, she asks if she can meet his ex-girlfriend to understand her side of the story. Unable to reveal the truth, Vikram decides to continue the lie. With the help of Chitti, he begins searching for a girl willing to act as his former lover.

While watching a stage play, Vikram notices Preethi, a talented theatre artist and dancer, and believes she would be perfect for the role. Preethi is an aspiring and career-oriented performer who lives with her aged grandfather and younger brother. Pressured by her grandfather to get married soon, she resists the idea as she wants to focus on her career. She eventually agrees to help Vikram on the condition that he pretends to be her boyfriend in front of her family.

The plan works successfully, and Preethi acts as Vikram’s former lover when meeting Anjali. Anjali forms a close bond with Preethi, believing her to be Vikram’s ex-girlfriend, and the three begin spending time together. Over time, Vikram and Preethi develop genuine feelings for each other. After a party one night, Vikram impulsively kisses Preethi in a lift. Around the same time, Anjali confesses that she has fallen in love with him.

Vikram later tries several times to confess his feelings to Preethi, but she distances herself, insisting that their relationship began as a lie and should remain that way. Meanwhile, Vikram finds himself torn between his feelings for Preethi and his upcoming marriage to Anjali. As the wedding preparations move forward quickly, Vikram and Anjali get engaged, with only a few days left before the wedding.

Realizing that she cannot forget him easily, Preethi attempts to contact Vikram but becomes heartbroken when she learns that his wedding is only days away. She decides to focus on her career and prepares to leave for a theatre project abroad. Before leaving, she gifts one of her paintings to Anjali.

While rehearsing for her performance abroad, Preethi is shocked to see Vikram at the theatre. It is revealed that Anjali had earlier opened the painting and noticed that it depicted the silhouette of Vikram and Preethi together. Realizing that the two still have feelings for each other, Anjali encourages Vikram to go after Preethi, believing that love cannot be forced. Vikram and Preethi finally admit their feelings and reunite, while Anjali writes a novel based on their love story titled "Enna Solla Pogirai".

== Cast ==
- Ashwin Kumar Lakshmikanthan as Vikram
- Teju Ashwini as Preethi
- Avantika Mishra as Anjali
- Pugazh as Chitti
- Delhi Ganesh as Preethi's grandfather
- Subbu Panchu as Anjali's father
- Priyadarshini Rajkumar as Anjali's mother
- Swaminathan as Swami
- Jay Adithya as Sanjay, Preethi's brother
- Haripriya Isai as Deepika
- T. M. Karthik as the bank manager

== Production ==
In April 2021, soon after the finale of the cooking reality show Cooku with Comali, participant Ashwin Kumar Lakshmikanthan (who finished at third) and comedian Pugazh announced that they would be appearing in a feature film together to be directed by A. Hariharan and produced by Trident Arts. In late June, the film's title was revealed to be Enna Solla Pogirai, derived from a song from Kandukondain Kandukondain (2000), and it is the debut for Ashwin as a solo lead actor after several supporting roles. After Hariharan wrote the script and pitched it to R. Ravindran of Trident Arts, it was the latter who suggested Ashwin. Hariharan explained the relevance of the title: "This question is pertinent especially when you're waiting to hear from your lover, right?". Two separate films with the same title were earlier announced – one in 2001 and another in 2011 – but neither came to fruition. In early July, Teju Ashwini and Avantika Mishra were announced as the lead actresses. Principal photography began on 19 July in Chennai. Richard M. Nathan, the cinematographer, sought to make the film "look clean and glossy" due to its genre, and also the look of an advertisement. With regards to lighting, he said he tried to eschew shadows and contrasts, and "showcase the actors in soft light from all sides, to create a pleasant look". The second schedule began in mid September. Filming wrapped in late October, and the film was edited by J. A. Mathivathanan.

== Soundtrack ==
The soundtrack is composed by Vivek–Mervin, and Muzik 247 holds the audio rights of the film's album. The majority of songs were released as singles; "Aasai" was released on 29 September 2021, "Cute Ponnu" on 20 November, and "Uruttu" on 2 December 2021. The audio launch was held on 6 December 2021, and the fourth single "It's Raining Love" was released the day after. A reprise version of "Aasai" was released on 8 December, and another single, "Neethandi", on 8 January 2022.

Track listing
No.	Title	Lyrics	Singer(s)	Length
1.	"Aasai"	Maathevan	Mervin Solomon	5:13
2.	"Cute Ponnu"	Arivu	Anirudh Ravichander, Vivek Siva	4:43
3.	"Uruttu"	Maathevan	Vivek Siva, Sivaangi Krishnakumar, Mervin Solomon, Santesh	3:59
4.	"It's Raining Love"	Ku. Karthik	Mervin Solomon	3:46
5.	"Aasai" (Reprise)	Maathevan	Bombay Jayashri	4:37
6.	"Neethanadi"	Prakash Francis	Mervin Solomon	4:06
7.	"It's Raining Love" (Theme)	—	—	0:57
8.	"Onnum Puriyalaye"	Maathevan	Christopher Stanley	2:38
9.	"Neethanada"	Prakash Francis	Sivaangi Krishnakumar	3:52
Total length:				33:51

== Release and reception ==
Enna Solla Pogirai was initially scheduled to release on 24 December 2021, but later pushed to 13 January 2022, the week of Pongal. M. Suganth of The Times of India rated the film 3 stars out of 5, saying, "The lively music by Vivek-Mervin and the chic visuals by cinematographer Richard Nathan also help to keep us involved in the proceedings. And there is genuine warmth in the way the director manages to resolve the issues of the characters". Avinash Ramachandran of Cinema Express wrote, "It is not often in Tamil cinema that we get a well-made romantic musical, and in many ways, Enna Solla Pogirai hopes to fill that vacuum. While it might not necessarily be a perfect fit, it is no doubt a decent value addition to this list" and rated the film 2.5 stars out of 5.

== Home media ==
The film began streaming on ZEE5 from 15 April 2022. It had its television premiere on Zee Tamil on 15 May 2022. The television premiere registered TRP ratings of 0.99.
