= Ramesh Solanki =

Indian activist

Personal details
- Born: Mumbai, Maharashtra, India
- Party: Shivsena till 2019 BJP Since September 2022
- Education: Kishinchand Chellaram College (B.COM)

Ramesh Solanki is a Hindu activist and former Shiv Sena member based in Mumbai, India. Solanki has registered several FIRs against TikTok users, Netflix India and Ajaz Khan over allegedly posting communal and defamatory content. He has recently joined the BJP.

== Political affiliation ==
Solanki was affiliated with Shiv Sena as secretary of IT cell and contact president of Gujarat section. He identifies himself as a social worker and Hinduvadi. After 2019 Maharashtra political crisis, Shiv Sena decided to ally with Nationalist Congress Party and Indian National Congress to form government. On 26 November 2019, Solanki resigned from Shiv Sena, after 21 years, by citing that his ideology would not let him work with Congress. Additionally, he said that he will always remain Balasaheb's Shivsainik.

== Activism ==
In July 2019, Solanki lodged a FIR against TikTok users for posting provocative content to take revenge following the 2019 Jharkhand mob lynching. Later, TikTok removed the controversial videos, blocked users and users apologised. Solanki had also registered a complaint against actor Ajaz Khan over mocking police machinery to defend those users who earlier posted videos. The actor was arrested and sent to judicial custody for 14 days.

Solanki lodged an FIR against Netflix for streaming 'Anti-Hindu' content, 'defaming' Hindus and India in September 2019. He also demanded that digital content should be passed from the censor board. His views have received backlash due to them potentially being an attack on free expression through media, and curtailing creative liberties.
