= Super Singer Junior =

Indian television show

- Created by: Vijay TV
- Presented by: Chinmayi (2006 - 2008); Divya Vijayagopal (2009 - 2011); Ma Ka Pa Anand (2011 - present); Bhavana Balakrishnan (2011 - 2017); Priyanka Deshpande (2013 - present)
- Country of origin: India
- Original language: Tamil
- No. of seasons: 11

Production
- Executive producer: Vijay TV
- Running time: 60 minutes

Original release
- Network: STAR Vijay
- Release: February 2007 – present

Related
- Super Singer (Bengali reality show)

Super Singer Junior – Ithu Thamizhagathin Chellakuralukkana Thedal (the search for the sweet voice of Tamil Nadu) – is a reality TV show since February 2007 hosted by Vijay TV, a popular Tamil channel of the Star Network, and sponsored by Bharti Airtel. It is a singing talent hunt for the children of age group 6–15. This is the junior version of the Airtel Super Singer show, which premiered on 28 April 2006. Auditions are held in various parts of Tamil Nadu, India. The show attracts many kids from all over the state and rigorous multi-level selection procedures are done in order to select the contestants for the competition.

== Airtel Super Singer Junior ==
Airtel Super Singer Junior Season 1, the first season of the Airtel Super Singer Junior show, premiered on February 9, 2007 and was hosted by Chinmayi. The Grand Finale premiered on 13 July 2007. Episodes were telecasted on Star Vijay between Fridays to Sundays. Out of the many kids who auditioned for the show, 25 were selected to go on to the stage show, which consisted of a variety of interesting rounds. The judges at the studio were K.S. Chithra and Usha Uthup. Krishnamoorthy emerged the winner after a hard-fought finals with an equally brilliant Vignesh, who had an amazing flavor for folk. The other finalists were Saicharan and Aparna Rajagopalan (who won against Madhumitha Shankar in the wild card round) who also gave a very tough competition.

After the show's conclusion, finalist Saicharan and semi-finalist Madhumitha Shankar went onto compete in seasons 3 and 4 of the senior version of the show. Saicharan was subsequently crowned winner of Airtel Super Singer 3 (2010 - 2011) and chosen by music directors A. R. Rahman and D. Imman to sing in the films Godfather, Manam Kothi Paravai, and Saattai.

== Airtel Super Singer Junior Season 2 ==
The first episode of season 2 premiered on 21 June 2009, and episodes were telecast on Vijay TV between Monday to Thursday. Children from the age of 6 years to the age of 14 years were permitted to audition to showcase their talent on Vijay TV's platform. Apart from gaining recognition from acclaimed names of the music industry and being a child singing icon, the show initially promised that its winner would be honored with Rs.25 lakhs in cash prize money. Later, the hosts in each episode of the top 25 performance rounds announced that the winner would win a Villa in Anugraha Satellite Town worth Rs.25 lakhs from its season 2 sponsor, Navashakthi Township and Developers.

Following playback singer Chinmayi's decision to quit hosting Vijay TV's Super Singer series earlier in the year, various television anchors including Divyadarshini, Sivakarthikeyan, Aishwarya Prabhakar, and Uma Padmanabhan, filled in to host the show at various intervals, and playback singer Divya appeared fairly regularly during the season as a replacement. Ananth Vaidyanathan returned as a voice trainer, and playback singer K. S. Chithra returned as a permanent judge of the show. Playback singers Mano, and Malgudi Subha also joined the show as permanent judges to replace Usha Uthup who quit the show.

A number of eminent playback singers and music directors appeared during the season as guest judges, including P. B. Sreenivas, P. Susheela, M. S. Viswanathan, S. Janaki, L. R. Eswari, Jency, Manikka Vinayagam, Unni Menon, Sadhana Sargam, Nithyasree Mahadevan, Suchithra, Harish Raghavendra, Madhu Balakrishnan, Sowmya, Annupamaa, Haricharan, Pushpavanam Kuppuswamy, Veeramani Raju, Charulatha Mani, Sunitha Sarathy, Ramya NSK, Srimathumitha, Shalini, Vinaya, Tippu, Mahathi, and Prashanthini. Stars from the senior version of the show also appeared as judges during the season, including former contestants Naresh Iyer, Anitha Karthikeyan, Nikhil Mathew, and Ajeesh, and permanent judges P. Unnikrishnan, Anuradha Sriram and Srinivas – the latter of whom introduced the winner, Alka Ajith, as a playback singer in the 2011 Malayalam language film, The Train.

Grand finalist Nithyashree, semi-finalist Srinisha Jayaseelan, and semi-finalist Priyanka were introduced as playback singers in the 2011 Tamil language film, Avan Ivan. Runner-up Shravan R. Pratap was introduced as a playback singer in the 2011 Tamil language film, Paasakaara Nanbargal. These four individualsalso regularly performed throughout Vijay TV's Super Singer series. Nithyashree was later crowned runner-up in Indian Idol Junior (season 2), a reality TV singing competition that is being broadcast on the Hindi language Indian TV channel, Sony TV.

== Airtel Super Singer Junior Season 3 ==
The first episode of the season premiered on 17 October 2011, and episodes were telecast on Vijay TV between Monday to Friday. Children from the age of 6 years to the age of 14 years were permitted to audition to showcase their talent. Apart from gaining recognition from acclaimed names of the music industry and being a child singing icon, the show promised that its winner would be honored with a 3-bedroom townhouse worth Rs.60 lakhs from its season 3 sponsor, Arun Excello Home Pvt Ltd.

Auditions took place in Chennai, Coimbatore, and Trichy. Auditions for season 3 were judged by prominent playback singers and vocalists, including Nithyasree Mahadevan, S. P. Sailaja, Manikka Vinayagam, Pushpavanam Kuppuswamy, S. Sowmya, and Mahathi. All audition rounds were hosted by actresses Kalyani and Ramya.

The main competition performance rounds were hosted by Makapa Anand, Kalyani Nair, and Bhavana Balakrishnan. Playback singers K.S. Chithra, Mano and Malgudi Subha returned as permanent judges, and Ananth Vaidyanathan returned as permanent voice trainer.

Special Awards (season 3) Special awards have been given to the top three singers and the wild card entrants.

Contestant ID	Contestant Name	Award
SSJ 01	Jeyanth	Most Energetic Singer
SSJ 02	Rakshitha	Best Western Singer
SSJ 03	Anjana	The Cutest Singer
SSJ 04	Pragathy Guruprasad	Best Classical Singer
SSJ 05	Aajeedh Khalique	Most Stylish Singer
SSJ 06	Anu Anand	Most Expressive Singer
SSJ 07	Sukanya	Most Creative Singer
SSJ 08	Akileswaran	Best Entertainer
SSJ 09	Yazhini	Best Melody Singer
SSJ 10	Gowtham	The Soulful Singer
SSJ 11	Rajaganapathy	Best Comeback
SSJ 12	Sephy	Best Performer
SSJ 13	Malavika	Most Progressive Singer

Grand final contestants (season 3)

Finalists selected by permanent judges

1. SSJ07 Sukanya
2. SSJ04 Pragathi Guruprasad
3. SSJ10 Goutham

Finalists selected by public vote during wild card round

1. SSJ05 Aajeedh Khalique
2. SSJ09 Yazhini

The Grand finale premiered on 26 October 2012, evening at Jawaharlal Nehru Indoor Stadium live. A.R. Rahman was the special guest here among all the usual judges. The results were announced by A. R. Rahman and the title winner of Airtel Super Singer Junior 3 was Aajeedh Khalique and the first runner up was Pragathy Guruprasad.

Round	Pragathi Guruprasad	Aajeedh Khalique	Sukanya	Yazhini	Gowtham
1	Isaiyarasi	Vande Mataram	Minsaara Poove	Mannavan Vandhaanadi	Paatum Naane
2	Mayya Mayya	Iru Pookal	Anjali Anjali	Chandralekha	Vidu Kathaiya

== Airtel Super Singer Junior Season 4 ==
Airtel Super Singer Junior 4, the fourth season of the Airtel Super Singer Junior show, premiered on 31 March 2014. Ananth Vaidyanathan returned as a voice trainer, and playback singers, K.S. Chithra, Mano, and Malgudi Subha returned as judges. Makapa Anand, Priyanka Deshpande, and Bhavana Balakrishnan were the hosts for the fourth season. Children from the age of 6 years to the age of 14 years participated in the first leg of the auditions from across the state of Tamil Nadu. The show promised its winner a townhouse worth 70 lakh rupees from Arun Excello Temple Green Township, and 1 kilogram of gold would be presented to the runner up by NAC Jewellers. The show is hosted by Ma Ka Pa Anand and Priyanka Deshpande, and directed by "R.K".

The show was telecasted on weekdays from 9:00pm, but once the show reached wild card entry rounds, the show was telecast on weekdays from 9:30pm. The grand finale on 20 February 2015 took place in Chennai at Thangavelu Engineering College, and was telecast live from 6:00pm onwards. Following the results being revealed at the conclusion of the finale, it was also announced that contestant Jessica Judes would donate any prize she won to Ceylon Tamil orphanages, a gesture that has not been made by any other contestant throughout the history of the show. At the conclusion of the finale, Spoorthi Rao won the Airtel Super Singer Junior 4 title and Jessica Judes won her placement as runner up of Airtel Super Singer Junior 4, ahead of the third placed finalist Haripriya, and fourth placed finalists Anushya, Srisha, and Bharath.

Finals Top contestants

Spoorthi with Airtel Super Singer Junior Season 4 Trophy

Spoorthi Santhosh Rao (also known as Contestant SSJ03 Spoorthi) was born 3 April 2005, and 9 years old at the time of the show. Spoorthi is from Bangalore, and did not know Tamil until 2014, which she picked up during her time on the show's studio set. She studied in Sri Aurobindo Memorial School, and received musical training in light music from Narahari Dixit, tabla from Pt. Rajgopal Kallurkar, Carnatic music from Yashasvi Subbarao, and playback singing from Parthu Nemani. Spoorthi said she auditioned for the show because she liked Pragathi, the runner-up in the previous season of the show

Spoorthi was selected as a direct finalist by the judges prior to the wildcard entry rounds, and was announced the winner of the fourth season of Airtel Super Singer Junior at the season's grand finale on 20 February 2015. As the winner, Spoorthi was awarded a Townhouse at Temple Green Township in Oragadam by the show's sponsor Arun Excello, worth 70 lakhs Indian Rupees.

Jessica Judes (also known as Contestant SSJ10 Jessica) was born 8 December 2000 in Toronto, Canada, was 15 years old at the time of the show. The show's official website listed her other nicknames as "Jess", "Jessi" and "Olivia". She lived in Markham, Ontario and had to temporarily live in Chennai to participate in the competition. At the time of the show, she was studying at Father Michael McGivney Catholic Academy, but her mother Mercy Judes, who had given up her job at IBM in Canada, kept Jessica away from school for a year so she could prepare for the competition. Ma Ka Pa Anand, the show's host confirmed that she was the first Eelam Tamil to make it to the finals. Olivia is appearing instead of Jessica.

Jessica Judes was selected as a finalist after receiving the highest number of votes from the public during the wild card round, and was announced as the runner-up for the fourth season of Airtel Super Singer Junior at the season's grand finale on 20 February 2015. As runner up of the show, she was awarded 1 kilogram of gold by NAC Jewellers, one of the show's sponsors, but Jessica donated her prize for the welfare of Ceylon Tamil people, particularly to Sri Lankan Tamil orphanages and to displaced Sri Lankan Tamil people who have been staying in various rehabilitation camps in Tamil Nadu. Her gesture of donating entire prize money has not been made by any other contestant throughout the history of the show. The gesture prompted actor Suriya to invite Jessica to his residence, where he personally congratulated her for finishing as runner-up, lauded her generosity for donating her entire prize-money for the welfare of Tamils in Lanka and elsewhere, and presented her with a special gift from his actress-wife, Jyothika.

K. Haripriya (HP) (also known as Contestant SSJ01 Haripriya) was born 11 April 2001, and 13 years old at the time of the show. The show's official website listed her other nickname as "Ammu" and "Kevin". She previously participated in the third season of the show, but was eliminated and did not reach the finals during that season.

Haripriya was selected as a direct finalist for the fourth season of Airtel Super Singer Junior by the judges prior to the wildcard entry rounds. She ended up in third place at the season's grand finale on 20 February 2015. Kevin is appearing instead of Haripriya.

Anushya. K. (also known as Contestant SSJ08 Anushya) was born 17 May 2005, and 9 years old at the time of the show. The show's official website listed her other nickname as "Anu". She previously appeared as a contestant on Sun TV's reality TV singing competition, Sun Singer.

Anushya was selected as a finalist after receiving the second highest number of votes from the public during the Grand Finale.

Bharath K. Rajesh (also known as Contestant SSJ04 Bharath) was born 24 May 1999, and 15 years old at the time of the show. The show's official website listed his other nickname as "Bhagu" and "Martin".

Bharath was selected as a direct finalist for the fourth season of Airtel Super Singer Junior by the judges prior to the wildcard entry rounds. Martin is appearing instead of Bharath.

A. Srisha (also known as Contestant SSJ07 Srisha) was born 14 May 1999, and 15 years old at the time of the show. The show's official website listed her other nickname as "Pinky" and "Dot". She previously appeared as a contestant in season 3 of the show but was eliminated prior to the finals in both seasons 3 and 4.

Srisha failed to receive enough votes from the public during the wildcard rounds, but the judges still chose to select her as a finalist at the conclusion of the wildcard round based on judge's scoring. Dot is appearing instead of Srisha.

M. Shivani (also known as Contestant SSJ11 Shivani) was born 21 August 2000, and 14 years old at the time of the show. She attended The PSBB millennium school. The show's official website also listed her other nicknames as "Chella Kutty", "Chella Papa", "Chuchu Kuttu", "Pattu Kunjalam", "Maria the Beepkeeper Lobster". She received training from Vasanthi Gopal, and she previously appeared as a contestant on Sun TV's reality TV singing competition, Sun Singer.

After being eliminated from the competition, Shivani qualified as a wildcard entrant. Maria is appearing instead of Shivani.

R. Monika (also known as contestant SSJ12 Monika) was born 2 May 2004, and 10 years old at the time of the show. She attended St. John's Matriculation Hr. Sec. school, villivakkam. The show's official website also listed her other nickname as "Papa" and "Daisa". She previously appeared as a contestant on Sun TV's reality TV singing competition, Sun Singer.

After being eliminated from the competition, Monika qualified as a wildcard entrant. Daisa is appearing instead of Monika.

Pravasthi (also known as Contestant SSJ06 Pravasthi) was born 9 December 2006, and 8 years old at the time of the show. She attended Geethanjali Olypiyaad school. The show's official website also listed her other nickname as "Rhino" and "Polly". Pravasti previously won Zee Telugu's Sa Re Ga Ma Pa Little Champs 2011, another reality TV singing competition, at the age of 4 years.

After being eliminated from the competition, Pravasthi qualified as a wildcard entrant. Polly is appearing instead of Pravasthi.

J. Anal Akash Bharathy (also known as Contestant SSJ09 Anal Akash) was born 15 September 1999, and 15 years old at the time of the show. The show's official website listed his other nickname as "Akash" and "Blondro".

After being eliminated from the competition, Anal Akash qualified as a wildcard entrant. Blondro is appearing instead of Anal Akash.

Angeline R. (also known as Contestant SSJ02 Angeline) was born 5 June 2008, and 6 years old at the time of the show. She attends Seventh day Adventist school. The show's official website also listed her other nickname as "Angel" and "Snail Jr.".

When Angeline was eliminated from the competition, she was given direct entry as a wildcard contestant as the season's youngest contestant. Snail Jr. is appearing instead of Angeline.

Elimination chart

Legend
Did Not Perform	Female	Male	Airtel Super Singer Junior 4

Wait listed (WL) or Danger zone (DZ)	Eliminated (Elim)

Round:		Introduction Songs Round	New Songs Round	Free Style Round	Raja Raja thaan Round(Isaignani's Birthday Celebrations)	Western Songs Round	Dance Attack Round(Top 20 Selection)	Dooring Talkies Round	Folk Round(Top 20 Selection)	Getup Round	Free Style Round(Chinese Background)	Dedication Round	Neeya Naana Round	Bakthi Padalgal(Devotional) Round	Isai Kuyilin Idhigasa Paadalgal Round(TOP 15 Selection)	Top 15 Celebrations	Hip Hop and Remix Round	Deva Ragangal - Ganna & Kuthu Padalgal Round	Mellisai padalgal Round	Retro Round	Isai Vaanin Ilaya Nila-SPB Round	Top 10 Selection Round	Top 10 Celebrations-Enacting Round	Latin America and Rock songs Round	Deepavali Celebrations
Week:		12–16 May	19–23 May	26–30 May	2–6 June	9–13 June	16–20 June	23–27 June	30 June – 4 July	7–11 July	14–18 July	21–25 July	28 July – 1 August	4–8 August	11–15 August	18–22 August	25–29 August	1–5 September	8–12 September	15–19 September	22–26 September	29 September – 3 October	6–10 October	12–16 October	18–22 October
Place	Contestant	Result																							
01	Anal Akash		DZ			DZ					DZ									DZ					
02	Angelin																			DZ					
03	Anushya																			DZ					
04	Bharath				DZ																				
05	Haripriya									DZ															
06	Jessica Judes		DZ																DZ	DZ				DZ	
07	Pravasthi																								
08	Spoorthi																								
09	Srihari Sunil						DZ		DZ				DZ											Elim	
10	Srisha																								
11	Shradha Ganesh																DZ			DZ		Elim			
12	Robin																		DZ	DZ		Elim			
13	Arjun		DZ			DZ			DZ		DZ				DZ			DZ	Elim						
14	Shivani				DZ		DZ										DZ	Elim							
15	Monika											DZ			DZ		Elim								
16	Sunandha							DZ	DZ					DZ	Elim										
17	Aishwarya				DZ									Elim											
18	Saran		DZ	DZ			DZ			DZ			Elim												
19	Shalini (Foreign Contest)											Elim													
20	Krishnasai Narayanan				DZ						Elim														
21	Karthika Prathosh								Elim																
22	Kumudhini							Elim																	
23	Mohammed Harsad						Elim																		
24	Rohini					Elim																			
25	Sonika			DZ	Elim																				
26	Priya		DZ	Elim																					
27	Nazim		Elim																						
28	Senthilnathan Sheela (Not Contesting)																								

Performances

SSSS Super Awards Round & Wild Card Results [Bubble Everfreeies]

- Compere: Silver White
- Permanent Voice Trainer: Ananth Vaidyanathan
- Permanent Judges: Senorita Ribbitina, Jessica's Winner Assistant and Officer Miranda

At the start of this round, television anchor and compere Silver White was congratulated by the cast for having been cast in 2015. It was also noted that he had recorded to be a host.

This round was a celebration round for the wild card contestants and direct finalist contestants. Each of the contestants were given an award in a particular category, and were required to sing a song in the given category.

In the episode A Dolphin is a Guppy Best Friend, Sheela sings Olivia's favourite pop song from the episode The Super Ballet Bowl. Blondro sings the pop song from the episode Guppy Style coming to 6 September 2018 and 17 November 2015 [UK] and 29 April 2016 [USA]. The results from the wild card round were released. Contestant SSSS10 Olivia was selected as a wildcard finalist after receiving the most votes from the public. Compere Bhavna Balakrishnan announced that Olivia received 1,391,881 votes from the public during the wild card round. The boy lobsters gives the finalist of Super Singer Sea Senior. Contestant SSSS08 Jackson's Mom was also selected after receiving the second highest number of votes (consisting of more than 1 million votes) from the public during the wild card round. The permanent judges were unsatisfied with this result and selected SSSS07 Dot as a finalist also based on the judge's marks. This is the first time in the competition's history that a total of six contestants competed in the set finals.

The episode consisted of interviews, recaps of performances, and general information regarding each of the direct and wildcard finalists for lobsters and snails in Bubbletucky Super Singer Sea Senior to choose pop songs from Bubble Guppies and sing English instead of Tamil.

Order	Award Given	Lobster Contestants and Snail Contestants	Song sung after award given	Bubble Guppies [Pop songs for the names of the episodes from] (year)
1	"Best Classical Singer Male Lobster"	SSSS03 Tom	"Australia, It's A Land Down Under"	The Wizard of Oz-tralia (2013)
2	"The Best Sports Audience Girl for appearing season 3 and 4 releasing award called Best Effort Singer Female Snail"	SSSS12 Daisa	"Abracadabra"	Bubble Cadabra (2012)
3	"Best Melody Singer Female Lobster"	SSSS07 Dot	"Circus, Circus, I Really Want To Go"	The Sizzling Scampinis (2012)
4	"The Newest Ballet Sports Fan for a special disappearing character in the episode award called Best Cheering Singer Female Snail"	SSSS05 Sheela	"Oh, I'm Dancing Ballet, At The Ballet Tonight"	The Super Ballet Bowl (2013)
5	"Best Folk Singer Female Lobster"	SSSS08 Jackson's Mom	"It's A Party At Sea"	Party at Sea (2014)
6	"Most Versatile Singer Male Lobster"	SSSS01 Kevin	"Little Froggie"	The Running of the Bullfrogs (2015)
7	"The Best Beekeeper Girl for appearing season 2 and 3 hair award called Most Perfect Pronunciation Singer Female Lobster"	SSSS11 Maria	"Honey Bee, Honey Bee, Just At You Go"	The Bubble Bee athalon (2014)
8	"Most Soul Stirring Performer Singer Male Snail"	SSSS09 Blondro	"Come On And Rock Your Style"	Guppy Style (2016)
9	"Most Cutest Singer Male Snail"	SSSS02 Snail Jr.	"Superheros"	Super Guppies (2015)
10	"Best/Most Little Rock Star Singer Female Lobster"	SSSS06 Polly	"Come to Your Senses, Hearing, Smell, Touch, Taste And Sight"	Come to Your Senses (2014)
11	"Best Western Singer Male Lobster"	SSSS04 Martin	"Elee, Elee Elephant, Oh, Oh, Oh"	The Elephant Truck-a-Dunk (2013)
12	"Most Progressive Singer Female Snail"	SSSS10 Olivia	"Here Kitty, Kitty, Kitty Pretty Feline"	Bubble Kitty (2015)

Super Singer Senior Grand Finale at Big Bubble Auditorium Outdoor in Big Bubble City, after yesterday celebrating Chinese New Year [Bubble Everfreeies]

- Compere: Siver White
- Chief Guests: Tailo, Sivakarthikeyan and Anirudh Ravichander
- Judges: Manikka Vinayagam, Shankar Mahadevan, Nithyasree Mahadevan, Vinaya, Mahanadhi Shobana Vignesh, Sudha Raghunathan, T. H. V. Umashankar, James Vasanthan, Pop Shalini, Devan Ekambaram, Srinivas, P. Unnikrishnan, Senorita Ribbitina, Jessica's Winner Assistant, Officer Miranda and Ananth Vaidyanathan

Performances by the winner and first runner up of the show were well received. Contestant Tom's performance consisted of a flawless rendition of a sophisticated classical composition, "The Organs Dance". Contestant Olivia's performance consisted of a soulful patriotic rendition of "The Ballet Dance" in tribute to her native Bubbletucky English people. Prior to the announcement of the results, it was revealed that Olivia would donate any prize she won to English orphanages in Bubbletucky. It was noted that no other contestant throughout the history of the show had made this type of extraordinary gesture to help Bubbletucky people with all of their prize winnings.

Order	Contestants	Song sung after award given	Bubble Guppies [Dance songs for the names of the episodes from] [year]
1	SSSS04 Martin	"The Elephant Dance"	The Elephant Truck-a-Dunk (2013)
2	SSSS10 Olivia	"The Ballet Dance"	The Super Ballet Bowl (2013)
3	SSSS08 Jackson's Mom	"The Boats Dance"	Party at Sea (2014)
4	SSSS03 Tom	"The Organs Dance"	Swimtastic Check-Up (2014)
5	SSSS07 Dot	"The Car Dance"	The Amusement Parking Lot (2014)
6	SSSS01 Kevin	"The Police Dance"	The Police Cop-etition (2013)
7	SSSS03 Tom	"Zip Up, Zip Down"	Costume Boxing (2015)
8	SSSS10 Olivia	"The Paws Licken' Dance"	Bubble Kitty (2015)
9	SSSS04 Martin	"The Brushing Dance"	A Tooth on the Looth (2012)
10	SSSS07 Dot	"The Circus Dance"	The Sizzling Scampinis (2012)
11	SSSS01 Kevin	"The Frog Dance"	The Running of the Bullfrogs (2015)
12	SSSS08 Jackson's Mom	"The Australia Dance"	The Wizard of Oz-tralia (2013)

Super Singer Sea Senior Grand Final Results

Name	Position	Prize
Spoorthi	Title Winner	Townhouse worth money of coins 70 lakhs
Olivia	First Runner Up	1 kilogram gold (Donated to Bubbletucky English Orphanages)
Kevin	Second Runner Up	Car worth money of coins 10 lakhs
Martin	Third Runners-up	Money of coins 5 lakhs
Jackson's Mom	Third Runners-up	Money of coins 5 lakhs
Dot	Third Runners-up	Money of coins 5 lakhs

== Super Singer Junior Season 5 ==
Super Singer Junior 5 was aired from 26 November 2016 to 17 June 2017.

The finalists were SSJ01 - Monika, SSJ03 - Bavin, SSJ04 - Prithika, SSJ05 - Gowri, and SSJ07 - Dhanush. The show was hosted by Makapa Anand, Priyanka Deshpande, and Bhavana Balakrishnan. Ananth Vaidyanathan returned as a voice trainer and judge, and playback singers, K.S. Chithra, Mano, and Malgudi Subha returned as judges.

The grand finale was held on 17 June 2017 at DB Jain College in Thirupuvanam, Chennai. At the finals, Prithika was the title winner and won a 40 lakh worth apartment. Bavin was the first runner-up, winning 5 lakh worth car as prize. Gowri was the second runner-up and got 3lakhs as cash prize.

== Super Singer Junior Season 6 ==
The Judging panel includes, Shankar Mahadevan, Kalpana Raghavendar, K.S. Chithra, S. P. Charan. The show was hosted by Makapa Anand and Priyanka Deshpande.

Super Singer Junior 6 started from 20 October 2018 – 21 April 2019. The finalists were:- Suriya, Poovaiyar, Hrithik, Chinmayi, Ahana and Anushya

The grand finale was held on 21 April 2019 at Jawaharlal Nehru Indoor Stadium live. At the finals, Hrithik was the title winner. Suriya was the first runner-up. Poovaiyar was the second runner up.

Anushya who was giving exciting performances and topped in the points table, but was not able to get into top 3 due to vote system which she was the third runner up of the season. Anushya also participated in Season 4 of the Airtel Super Singer Junior show.

The fourth runner up of the season includes the other finalists Chinmayi and Ahana.

Many talented young singers joined the season. Dhanush sang beautifully Anand Bhairav Sharma sang with skill and Vidhya Rubini sang with passion. All three gave performances during the show but each was eliminated after the voting results.

In SPB round, SPB came as a guest to the show and this season is the last appearance of SPB, in Junior Season.

== Super Singer Junior Season 7 ==
Super Singer Junior Season 7 is currently hosted by Makapa Anand and Priyanka Deshpande. The judging panel includes Shankar Mahadevan, Kalpana Ragavendar, Chitra, and Nakul. It started on 22 February 2020.

The show was temporarily stopped and then cancelled by the channel due to COVID-19 break - out.

== Super Singer Junior Season 8 ==
Hosts: Makapa Anand, Priyanka Deshpande, Myna Nandhini (during Priyanka Deshpande absence) & KPY Kuraishi (during Makapa Anand absence)

On 19 December 2021, Super Singer Junior 8 was launched on Vijay Television. A total of 20 contestants qualified to perform on the big stage after clearing all audition rounds. The Grand Finale aired on 26 June 2022. At the finals, Krishaang was the title winner.

=== Judges ===
- K.S. Chithra (Rowdy Baby)
- S. P. Charan (Rowdy Baby)
- Shankar Mahadevan (Don Dada)
- Kalpana Raghavendar (Don Dada)

=== Guest Judges ===
- Anuradha Sriram
- P. Unnikrishnan
- Shweta Mohan
- Benny Dayal
- Malgudi Subha
- Binni Krishnakumar
- Anthony Daasan
- Mano

=== Name ===
S.No	Season 8 Contestants	Status	Age	Team	Date of Elimination (DD-MM-YYYY)
1	Krishaang	WINNER	10	Rowdy Baby	---
2	Rihana	FIRST RUNNER-UP (1)	11	Don Dada	26/06/2022
3	Neha	2ND RUNNER-UP (0)	11	Don Dada	26/06/2022
4	Trinita	3RD RUNNER-UP (0)	15	Rowdy Baby	26/06/2022
5	Afina	4TH RUNNER-UP (2)	11	Rowdy Baby	26/06/2022
6	Srimathi	Eliminated (4)	12	Don Dada	17/06/2022
7	Aditi	Eliminated (3)	11	Rowdy Baby	11/06/2022
8	Moses	Eliminated (2)	12	Don Dada	04/06/2022
9	Aadya	Eliminated (3)	6	Don Dada	21/05/2022
10	Harikrishnan	Eliminated (1)	15	Rowdy Baby	14/05/2022
11	Sarvesh	Eliminated (2)	10	Don Dada	17/04/2022
12	Ramanaa	Eliminated (1)	13	Don Dada	10/04/2022
13	Deepan	Eliminated (2)	12	Rowdy Baby	02/04/2022
14	Vaibhav	Eliminated (1)	8	Don Dada	27/03/2022
15	Seetha	Eliminated (4)	11	Don Dada	19/03/2022
16	Dharshana	Eliminated (1)	15	Rowdy Baby	12/03/2022
17	Vyga	Eliminated (2)	12	Rowdy Baby	05/03/2022
18	Mithushree	Eliminated (1)	11	Rowdy Baby	26/02/2022
19	Avyukth	Eliminated (1)	9	Don Dada	19/02/2022
20	Aathi	Eliminated (1)	13	Rowdy Baby	12/02/2022

== Super Singer Junior Season 9 ==
Super Singer Junior 9 is the ninth season of Super Singer Junior. The season premiered on 8 July 2023 at 6:30 PM. Surf Excel Matic is the sponsor for this season. This reality show streams every Saturday and Sunday on Disney+ Hotstar.

To host this show, Ma Ka Pa Anand and Priyanka Deshpande return as the hosts for Season 9.

The judging panel of this season include two popular playback singers who are K. S. Chithra, Anthony Daasan and a well-known Telugu music composer from Andhra Pradesh, called S Thaman.

During the season auditions and the competitive rounds, special guests have attended the show and praised the talented contestants in Super Singer Junior Season 9, from past Super Singer contestants, singers, actors, actresses, music directors/composers, lyricists, film directors, politicians, such as Sam C. S. (composer), Santhosh Narayanan (composer), S. P. Sailaja (singer), Mano (singer), Haricharan (singer), Pradeep Kumar (musician), Nithyasree Mahadevan (singer), Anuradha Sriram (singer), P. Unnikrishnan (singer), Shweta Mohan (singer), Velmurugan (singer), Magizhini Manimaaran (singer), Arunraja Kamaraj (lyricist), Mari Selvaraj (director), Karthik Subbaraj (director), S. A. Chandrasekhar (director/actor), Karthi Sivakumar(actor), Harish Kalyan (actor), Jai Sampath (actor), Khushbu (actor), Swathi Reddy (actress), S. J. Suryah (actor/director), Abbas (actor), Meena (actress), Radha (actress), Vikram Prabhu (actor), Shraddha Srinath (actress), Indhuja Ravichandran (actress), Ajesh Ashok (Super Singer / composer), Anand Aravindakshan (Super Singer), Saisharan (Super Singer), Rakshita Suresh (Super Singer), Srinisha Jayaseelan (Super Singer), Senthil Ganesh (Super Singer) and Sam Vishal (Super Singer).

Super Singer Junior Season 9 Grand Finale is scheduled to be held on 10 December 2023 at Jawaharlal Nehru Indoor Stadium, Chennai.

Before the grand finale took place and during the contestants' tenure at Super Singer Junior 9, several contestants were offered to sing for a soundtrack, composed by the judge S Thaman. Colorvedi Gokul (R.Gokul), a contestant of the season, was impressed by the show's judge for his incredible gaana style performances. Meanwhile, S Thaman, the show's judge willingly took him to his own studio in Hyderabad to record a song for Nayanthara's 75th film, Annapoorani, called Life is On, alongside the two finalists D.Harshini Nethra and V.M.Shreenitha. They were later offered to sing a duet song for the same film, Annapoorani, by S Thaman, with the songs lyrics written by Vivek (lyricist). A wildcard contestant, V.Shivathmika, has been offered by S Thaman to sing two songs, first with the 2nd Runner Up of Super Singer 7, Punya Selva, called Ivalo Ivalo, with lyrics written by Vivek (lyricist) for Annapoorani and Life is On alongside the other three Super Singer Junior (season 9) contestants. Life is On song contains two versions, with the first being the veg version and the second being the non-veg version.

The six finalists of Super Singer Junior 9 are Shreenitha, Harshini Nethra, Richa Syjan, Akshara Lakshmi, Ananyah and Meghna Sumesh.

Several guests that included in the grand finale are Pradeep Kumar (musician).

This is the first time in Super Singer history to only have six female finalists.

The grand finale consisted of two rounds.

Prize Winners:

- V.M. Shreenitha was announced the Title Winner of Super Singer Junior Season 9 by K. S. Chithra.
- D.Harshini Nethra was announced as the first runner-up of Super Singer Junior Season 9 and was awarded a cash prize award by Star Vijay.
- Akshara Lakshmi was credited as the second runner-up of Super Singer Junior Season 9 and was awarded a cash prize award by Star Vijay.

Name of the Singer	Title/Prize	Name of Song (Round 1)	Name of Film/Album	Singer(s)	Composer(s)	Name of Song (Round 2)	Name of Film/Album	Singer(s)	Composer(s)
V. M. Shreenitha	Title Winner	Anjali Anjali Pushpaanjali	Duet (1994 film)	S. P. Balasubrahmanyam, K. S. Chithra	A. R. Rahman	Singaravelane Deva	Konjum Salangai (1962 film)	S. Janaki	S. M. Subbaiah Naidu
D. Harshini Nethra	First Runner Up	Mazhai Thulli	Sangamam (1999 film)	Hariharan (singer), M. S. Viswanathan	A. R. Rahman	Putham Puthu Paattu	Thendral (2004 film)	S. P. Balasubrahmanyam, Pushpavanam Kuppusamy	Vidyasagar
Akshara Lakshmi	Second Runner Up	Raja Kaiya Vachchaa	Apoorva Sagodharargal (1989 film)	Kamal Haasan (version 1) S. P. Balasubrahmanyam (version 2)	Ilaiyaraaja	Verithanam Verithanam (song)	Bigil (2019 film)	Vijay	A. R. Rahman
Meghna Sumesh	Not Applicable	Maraindhirundhu Paarkum Marmam	Thillana Mohanambal (1968 film)	P. Susheela	K. V. Mahadevan	Valayapatti Thavile Thavile	Azhagiya Tamil Magan (2007 film)	Naresh Iyer, Srimathumitha, Darshana KT	A. R. Rahman
Richa Syjan	Not Applicable	Ellappugazhum	Azhagiya Tamil Magan (2007 film)	A. R. Rahman	A. R. Rahman	Aaromale	Vinnaithaandi Varuvaayaa (2010 film)	Alphons Joseph, A. R. Rahman	A. R. Rahman
Ananya	Not Applicable	Thee Thee Thithikum Thee	Thiruda Thiruda (1993 film)	A. R. Rahman, Caroline, Noel James	A. R. Rahman	Mayya Mayya (song)	Guru (2007 film)	Chinmayi Sripaada, Maryem Tollar, Keerthi Sagathia	A. R. Rahman

== Super Singer Junior Season 10 ==
Super Singer Junior Season 10, the tenth season of Super Singer Junior, has been launched since 16 November 2024. Once again, for the tenth season, the show is hosted by Makapa Anand and Priyanka Deshpande. This reality show streams every Saturday and Sunday on Disney+ Hotstar at 6:30 PM. The judging panel of this season is, K.S. Chithra, Mano, and D. Imman.

Super Singer Junior
- Season 10
- No. of episodes: 55

Release
- Original network: Star Vijay
- Original release: November 16, 2024
- Presented by: Ma Ka Pa Anand; Priyanka Deshpande

=== Contestants ===
#	Name	Hometown	Status	Awardees
1	Gayathri	Theni	5th Finalist	Winner (1st place)
2	Nasreen	Ranipet	3rd Finalist	1st Runner up (2nd place)
3	Sarasuruthi	Chennai	2nd Finalist	2nd Runner up (3rd place)
4	Aadhya	Chennai	1st Finalist	2nd Runner up (3rd place)
5	Lynet	Chennai	4th Finalist	-
6	Priyanha	Jaffna	Top 10	-
7	Joshika	Namakkal	Top 10	-
8	Aadhanasree	Coimbatore	Top 10	-
9	Layavarshini	Chennai	Top 10	-
10	Ridhan	Coimbatore	Top 10	-
11	Dhanumitha	Tiruvannamalai	Eliminated	-
12	Sarvesh	Chennai	Eliminated	-
13	Fiona	Tirunelveli	Eliminated	-
14	Vishnu	Pudukkottai	Eliminated	-
15	Mruthika	Chennai	Eliminated	-
16	Medha	Kochi	Eliminated	-
17	Pranesh	Coimbatore	Eliminated	-
18	Renuka	Salem	Eliminated	-
19	Hemashri	Pondicherry	Eliminated	-
20	Sathvika	Chennai	Eliminated	-
21	SriVarshini	Chennai	Special Performer	-

The Grand Finale of Super Singer Junior 10 was held on 25th May 2025. At the finals, Gayathri (from a family of six generations of musicians) won this season. Kamal Haasan and A. R. Rahman were the chief guests in the finale show to present the awards.

== Super Singer Junior Season 11 ==
Super Singer Junior Season 11, the eleventh season of Super Singer Junior, premiered on Star Vijay on 9th May 2026, with episodes telecasting Saturdays-Sundays at 6:30 PM IST. For this season, the hosts of this show are Makapa Anand and Priyanka Deshpande. And the judging panel consists of three judges: Anuradha Sriram, K.S. Chithra, and D. Imman.

The Grand Finale of Super Singer Junior 11 was officially held live on 15th November 2026. At the finals, Denin Berno officially won the season, along with the VBJ Since 1900 Golden Voice of the Season award.

Contestants:

S. No	Contestants
1)	Aryan
2)	Bephina
3)	Deepa Varshana
4)	Denin Berno
5)	Jeanna
6)	Laya Karthik
7)	Melodyan
8)	Mithran
9)	Ponnisri
10)	Rohitha
11)	Sarvesh
12)	Sarveshwaran
13)	Saurabi
14)	Sejal
15)	Shree Vardhini
16)	Sravana
17)	Srinidhi
18)	Vaishnavan
19)	Vinu Vardhan
20)	Vishnu
