= Avantika Mishra =

Indian actress and model

Avantika Mishhra
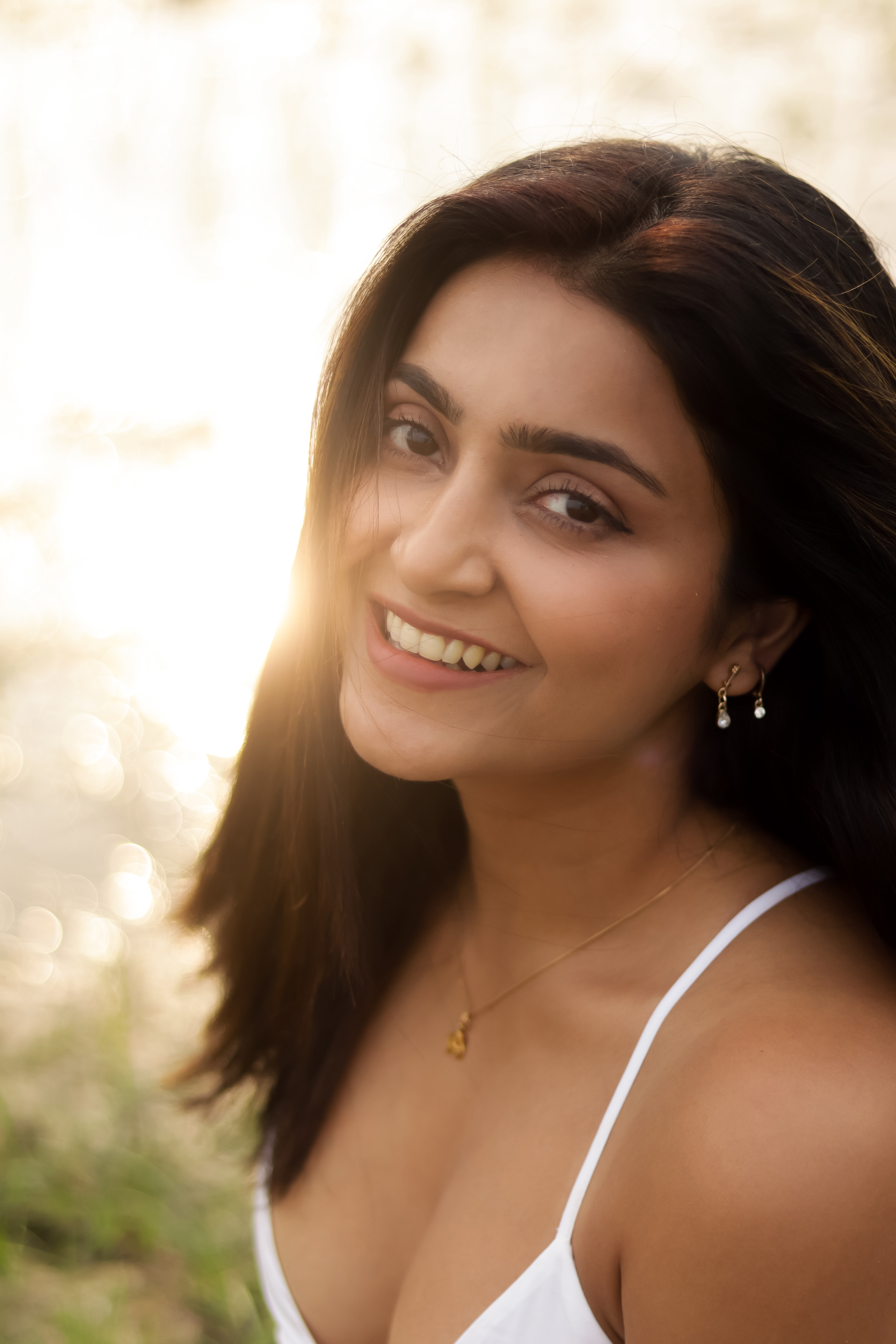
- Mishra in 2024
- Occupations: Actress, Model
- Years active: 2014–present

Avantika Mishhra is an Indian actress and former model who predominantly appears in Telugu films. She has also acted in Tamil films.

== Early life and background ==
A native of New Delhi, she studied in the Air Force Golden Jubilee Institute and K V Hebbal, Bangalore. She has done her under graduation from BMS College of Engineering, Basavanagudi, Bangalore.Later, she traveled a lot for modeling assignments, which gave her the confidence to enter the film industry. After being in modeling for six months, she got a chance to meet director Neelakanta for the Telugu film Maaya.

== Career ==
Avantika Mishra began her career as a model for Puma, Femina, and several other brands. Her first acting role was in Neelakanta's Maaya. She played the lead in Meeku Meere Maaku Meme alongside Tarun Shetty; the film was released on 17 June 2016.

She appeared alongside Tharun Bhascker Dhaassyam and Vani Bhojan in the film Meeku Maathrame Cheptha produced by Vijay Deverakonda. She will be next seen as a lead in D Block, a college-based drama alongside actor Arulnithi and directed by YouTuber Vijay Kumar Rajendran (of Eruma Saani fame). She is also playing the lead in Enna Solla Pogirai, a film to be directed by debutante Hariharan for Trident Arts production co-starring Ashwin Kumar Lakshmikanthan.

== Filmography ==
=== Films ===
Year	Title	Role	Language	Notes
2014	Maaya	Meghana	Telugu	Debut film
2016	Meeku Meere Maaku Meme	Priya	Telugu	
2017	Vaisakham	Bhanumathi	Telugu	
2019	Meeku Maathrame Cheptha	Rakesh's co-anchor	Telugu	Cameo Appearance
2020	Bheeshma	The Girl in the Temple	Telugu	Special appearance in the song "Singles Anthem"
2022	Enna Solla Pogirai	Anjali	Tamil	Debut in Tamil cinema
2022	D Block	Shruthi	Tamil	
2024	Emakku Thozhil Romance	Leona Joseph	Tamil	
TBA	Untitled film with Axess Film Factory †	TBA	Tamil	Filming

=== Music Videos ===
Year	Title	Singer	Notes
2020	Raasathi Nenje	Yuvan Shankar Raja, Dharan Kumar	
2021	Shades of Kadhal	Sudharshan Ashok, Nalini Vittobane	Portraying Herself

=== Web series ===
Year	Title	Role	Language	Platform	Notes
2023	Athidhi	Maya	Telugu	Disney+Hotstar	
2023	Goli Soda Rising	Janani	Tamil	Disney+Hotstar	
