= Super Singer Junior season 9 =

Television show premiered by Star Vijay

Super Singer Junior
- Season 9
- Super Singer Junior Season 9 with the three main judges
- Presented by: Ma Ka Pa Anand; Priyanka Deshpande
- Judges: K.S. Chithra; Thaman S; Anthony Daasan

Release
- Original network: Star Vijay
- Original release: July 8 – December 10, 2023

Season chronology
- ← Previous; Season 8 Next → Season 10

Super Singer Junior Season 9 is the ninth season of the Indian Tamil-language music competition reality television show Super Singer Junior,. It launched on 8 July 2023 on Star Vijay . This reality television show streamed on Disney+ Hotstar on every Saturday and Sunday at 18:30. Ma Ka Pa Anand and Priyanka Deshpande return as hosts for the ninth season of Super Singer Junior.

The series's contestants were young children between the ages of 6–14 years. Auditions took place in Tamil Nadu from April 2023. The judging panel of this season includes composer Thaman S, and popular playback singers K.S. Chithra, and Anthony Daasan. Thaman S is the third new judge to join the judging panel in Super Singer Junior Season 9.

Surf Excel Matic was the sponsor of Super Singer Junior Season 9. The Grand Finale of Super Singer Junior 9 was on 10 December 2023. At the finals, Shreenitha was the winner of this season.

== Format ==
Initially, Super Singer Junior Season 9 commenced with 13 female contestants and 4 male contestants. During the Introduction Round, the concept of golden shower was brought by the show to indicate that they were selected by the three judges, Thaman S, K.S. Chithra and Anthony Daasan, from the judging panel and have now joined the Super Singer Junior Season 9.

== Contestants ==
The contestants have made it to the mega auditions of Super Singer Junior Season 9. Then the contestants await the judges' decision to decide their fate of whether they would be able to continue their journey at Super Singer Junior Season 9.

Name	Hometown	Gender
V.M. Shreenitha	Coimbatore	Female
Kenly Sija	Rameswaram	Female
Prohitha Sri	Nilgiris	Female
Viswa Rubini	Tirunelveli	Female
Sameera	Thanjavur	Female
Colorvedi Gokul(R. Gokul)	Chennai	Male
Meghna Sumesh	Kerala	Female
Mohana Sree	Hosur	Female
Sadhana	Pallikaranai	Female
Logeshwaran	Lalgudi	Male
Shreya Sen	Madurai	Female
Dhanya Sri Sai	Pammal	Female
Shanumithra	Kodungaiyur	Female
Maithrayan	Kavundampalayam	Male
Akshara Lakshmi	Malumichampatti	Female
Richa Syjan	Gummidipoondi	Female
B. Harshini Nethra	Viluppuram	Female
Gaurav	Kumbakonam	Male
V. Shivathmika	Medavakkam	Female
Ananyah	Chennai	Female

== Episodes ==
After the weekly rounds of Super Singer Junior Season 9, several performers would be announced as the Best Performer (BP) and Best Entertainer (BE) of the week.

Air date(s)	Round name	Best performer and entertainer	Special guest(s) and judge(s)
2 July 2023	Ovvoru Kuralum Oru Kadhai Sollum round (ஒவ்வொரு குரலும் ஒரு கதை சொல்லும்)		Super Singer Junior 8 Contestants
8 July 2023	Mega auditions		Kamal Haasan (during the streaming video not the live event)
9 July 2023	Mega auditions		Kamal Haasan (during the streaming video not the live event)
15 July 2023	En Kural En Kadhai round (என் குரல் என் கதை)	1) Best Performer – Ananyah 2) Best Performer – Richa Syjan 3) Best Performer – Colorvedi Gokul	
16 July 2023	En Kural En Kadhai round (என் குரல் என் கதை)	1) Best Performer – Ananyah 2) Best Performer – Richa Syjan 3) Best Performer – Colorvedi Gokul	
22 July 2023	En Kural En Kadhai round (என் குரல் என் கதை)	1) Best Performer – Ananyah 2) Best Performer – Richa Syjan 3) Best Performer – Colorvedi Gokul	
23 July 2023	En Kural En Kadhai round (என் குரல் என் கதை)	1) Best Performer – Ananyah 2) Best Performer – Richa Syjan 3) Best Performer – Colorvedi Gokul	
29 July 2023	Folk round (மக்கள் இசை சுற்று); K. S. Chithra's 60th Birthday Celebration		Former Super Singer Senior Contestants; Former Super Singer Junior Contestants; Senthil Ganesh (Super Singer); Rajalakshmi Senthil; VM Mahalingam
5 August 2023	Folk round (மக்கள் இசை சுற்று)	1) Best Performer – Meghna Sumesh 2) Best Performer – Harshini Nethra 3) Best Performer – Sadhana	Magizhini Manimaaran (singer); Anthakudi Ilayaraja; Kidakuzhi Mariyammal; Gana Ulaganathan
6 August 2023	Folk round (மக்கள் இசை சுற்று)	1) Best Performer – Meghna Sumesh 2) Best Performer – Harshini Nethra 3) Best Performer – Sadhana	Magizhini Manimaaran (singer); Anthakudi Ilayaraja; Kidakuzhi Mariyammal; Gana Ulaganathan
12 August 2023	Duet round	1) Best Performer – 2) Best Performer – 3) Best Performer –	Mano (judge); Meena (actress) Anand Aravindakshan (Super Singer); Srinisha Jayaseelan (Super Singer); Stephen Zachariah; Former Super Singer Senior Contestants
13 August 2023	Duet round	1) Best Performer – 2) Best Performer – 3) Best Performer –	Mano (judge); Meena (actress) Anand Aravindakshan (Super Singer); Srinisha Jayaseelan (Super Singer); Stephen Zachariah; Former Super Singer Senior Contestants
19 August 2023	Duet round	1) Best Performer – 2) Best Performer – 3) Best Performer –	Mano (judge); Meena (actress) Anand Aravindakshan (Super Singer); Srinisha Jayaseelan (Super Singer); Stephen Zachariah; Former Super Singer Senior Contestants
20 August 2023	Duet round	1) Best Performer – 2) Best Performer – 3) Best Performer –	Mano (judge); Meena (actress) Anand Aravindakshan (Super Singer); Srinisha Jayaseelan (Super Singer); Stephen Zachariah; Former Super Singer Senior Contestants
26 August 2023	90's vs 2000's round		P. Unnikrishnan (singer); Shweta Mohan (singer); Abbas (actor)
27 August 2023	90's vs 2000's round		P. Unnikrishnan (singer); Shweta Mohan (singer); Abbas (actor)
2 September 2023	Stars favourite round		
3 September 2023	Stars favourite round		
9 September 2023	Dedication round		Anuradha Sriram (singer) Mari Selvaraj (director)
10 September 2023	Dedication round		Anuradha Sriram (singer) Mari Selvaraj (director)
16 September 2023	Dedication round		Anuradha Sriram (singer) Mari Selvaraj (director)
17 September 2023	Dedication round		Anuradha Sriram (singer) Mari Selvaraj (director)
23 September 2023	Devotional round		KovaiKamala(singer) Nithyasree Mahadevan (singer) Velmurugan (singer) Veeramani Raju
24 September 2023	Devotional round		KovaiKamala(singer) Nithyasree Mahadevan (singer) Velmurugan (singer) Veeramani Raju
30 September 2023	Devotional round		KovaiKamala(singer) Nithyasree Mahadevan (singer) Velmurugan (singer) Veeramani Raju
1 October 2023	Devotional round		KovaiKamala(singer) Nithyasree Mahadevan (singer) Velmurugan (singer) Veeramani Raju
7 October 2023	Celebrating SPB	SPB Trophy Winner - Shreenitha	Khushbu (actress) S. P. Sailaja (singer) Sivaangi Krishnakumar (Super Singer / Actress / Host)
8 October 2023	Celebrating SPB	SPB Trophy Winner - Shreenitha	Khushbu (actress) S. P. Sailaja (singer) Sivaangi Krishnakumar (Super Singer / Actress / Host)
14 October 2023	Ninaithale Inikkum round		
15 October 2023	Ninaithale Inikkum round		
21 October 2023	Radio hits		Radha (actress, judge); Ajesh Ashok (Super Singer / composer); Saisharan (Super Singer); Sam Vishal (Super Singer)
22 October 2023	Radio hits		Radha (actress, judge); Ajesh Ashok (Super Singer / composer); Saisharan (Super Singer); Sam Vishal (Super Singer)
28 October 2023	Aadalum Paadalum round		Santhosh Narayanan (composer); Karthik Subbaraj (director); S. J. Suryah (actor/director) (Jigarthanda DoubleX Team)
29 October 2023	Aadalum Paadalum round		Santhosh Narayanan (composer); Karthik Subbaraj (director); S. J. Suryah (actor/director) (Jigarthanda DoubleX Team)
4 November 2023	First ticket to finale	First finalist – Shreenitha	
5 November 2023	First ticket to finale	First finalist – Shreenitha	
11 November 2023	Ilaiyaraaja round	Second finalist – Harshini Nethra	Karthi Sivakumar (actor) Swathi Reddy (actress) Former Super Singer Senior Contestants Srinisha Jayaseelan (Super Singer) Rakshita Suresh (Super Singer)
12 November 2023	Ilaiyaraaja round	Second finalist – Harshini Nethra	Karthi Sivakumar (actor) Swathi Reddy (actress) Former Super Singer Senior Contestants Srinisha Jayaseelan (Super Singer) Rakshita Suresh (Super Singer)
18 November 2023	இசைப்புயலின் 90ஸ் ஹிட்ஸ் (AR Rahman) S Thaman's 40th Birthday Celebration	Third finalist - Richa Syjan Fourth finalist - Akshara Lakshmi 1) Stylish Performer of the Week - Shivathmika	Sam C. S. (composer) Jai Sampath(actor); Arunraja Kamaraj (lyricist); Former Super Singer Senior Contestants
19 November 2023	இசைப்புயலின் 90ஸ் ஹிட்ஸ் (AR Rahman) S Thaman's 40th Birthday Celebration	Third finalist - Richa Syjan Fourth finalist - Akshara Lakshmi 1) Stylish Performer of the Week - Shivathmika	Sam C. S. (composer) Jai Sampath(actor); Arunraja Kamaraj (lyricist); Former Super Singer Senior Contestants
25 November 2023	Wildcard round	Fifth finalist - Ananyah Sixth finalist - Meghna Sumesh	Indhuja Ravichandran (actress) Harish Kalyan (actor)
26 November 2023	Wildcard round	Fifth finalist - Ananyah Sixth finalist - Meghna Sumesh	Indhuja Ravichandran (actress) Harish Kalyan (actor)
2 December 2023	Pre-finals round		Haricharan (singer); Tippu (singer); Bhavana Balakrishnan (host / commentator)
3 December 2023	Pre-finals round		Haricharan (singer); Tippu (singer); Bhavana Balakrishnan (host / commentator)
9 December 2023	Celebration round		Bhavana Balakrishnan (host / commentator) Sivaangi Krishnakumar (Super Singer / Actress / Host)
10 December 2023	Grand finale - live	Winner - Shreenitha First runner-up - Harshini Nethra Second runner-up - Akshara Lakshmi	Pradeep Kumar (musician) Sathish (actor)Dhivyadharshini (actress) Nikhil Mathew (Super Singer) Diwakar (Super Singer) Saisharan (Super Singer) Srinisha Jayaseelan (Super Singer)
