= Bigg Boss (Tamil TV series) season 4 =

Season of Indian Tamil-language reality show

Bigg Boss
- Season 4
- Bigg Boss season 4
- Presented by: Kamal Haasan
- No. of days: 105
- No. of housemates: 18
- Winner: Aari Arujunan
- Runner-up: Balaji Murugadoss
- No. of episodes: 106

Release
- Original network: Star Vijay
- Original release: 4 October 2020 – 17 January 2021

Season chronology
- ← Previous; Season 3 Next → Season 5

Bigg Boss 4 is the fourth season of the Tamil-Indian reality TV series Bigg Boss. Kamal Haasan returned as host of the show for the fourth time. The show was launched on 4 October 2020 on Star Vijay and also available on Disney+ Hotstar.

The season's finale took place on 17 January 2021 with Aari Arjunan winning the Bigg Boss title with the highest number of voting percentage in the history of Bigg Boss Tamil franchise, whereas Balaji Murugadoss emerged as the first runner-up. Dabur Herbal Clove Toothpaste was the main sponsor for the fourth season.

Anitha Sampath, Balaji Murugadoss, Ramya Pandian and Suresh Chakravarthi returned as contestants in Bigg Boss Ultimate. Balaji Murugadoss eventually won it.

== Production ==
=== Eye logo ===
This season, the logo is a colorful eye with a pupil that resembles a compass, filled with multiple colours. Every season, the logo of the show is changed based on a particular theme. This theme has also been incorporated in the interiors of the house.

=== House ===
The house has been completely renovated from Season 3. Rather than warm colours from the last season, this time, the house has been fully designed in vibrant shades with lights.

Rooms/Areas in the house include the confession room, living room, kitchen, dining room, store room, two attached bedrooms (along with an attached toilet in one of the rooms), bathroom, garden with some lounging areas, swimming pool (not in use this season), gym (removed), activity room and resting room (Bigg Boss Prison).

This season stands out as the only one in the Bigg Boss Tamil franchise to forgo the 'Secret Room' feature, which had been utilized in the previous three seasons. It also marked the beginning of a trend, with the feature remaining unused in all subsequent seasons.

Only Season to properly utilise the prison feature for most weeks (10/15)

=== Airing ===
It was broadcast on the channel throughout the week at 09:30 PM from 4 October 2020 to 3 January 2021 and, it was broadcast on the channel throughout the weekdays at 10:00 PM and 09:30 PM at the weekends from 4 January 2021 to 17 January 2021.

=== Audience and guests ===
There was no in person audience due to the COVID-19 pandemic. However, they were connected via Zoom to see the Grand Launch and the Weekend episodes. Similarly, no guests appeared on Bigg Boss due to the COVID-19 situation. During the thirteenth week however, the parents of the contestants were allowed to come in-person to the house and meet their family members who were participating in the show after two weeks of quarantine.

=== Bigg Boss 4 voting ===
As Bigg Boss 4 online voting has begun, viewers can vote for their favorite contestant through Hotstar, or by giving a missed call. Voting is only open on Weekdays on Hotstar.

== Housemate status ==
| SR. | Housemates | Day entered | Day exited | Status |
|---|---|---|---|---|
| 1 | Aari | Day 1 | Day 105 | Winner |
| 2 | Balaji | Day 1 | Day 105 | 1st Runner-up |
| 3 | Rio | Day 1 | Day 105 | 2nd Runner-up |
| 4 | Ramya | Day 1 | Day 105 | 3rd Runner-up |
| 5 | Somshekar | Day 1 | Day 105 | 4th Runner-up |
| 6 | Gabriela | Day 1 | Day 102 | Walked ₹5L |
| 7 | Shivani | Day 1 | Day 98 | Evicted |
| 8 | Aajeedh | Day 1 | Day 21 | Saved |
| 8 | Aajeedh | Day 21 | Day 91 | Evicted |
| 9 | Anitha | Day 1 | Day 84 | Evicted |
| 10 | Archana | Day 11 | Day 77 | Evicted |
| 11 | Nisha | Day 1 | Day 70 | Evicted |
| 12 | Jithan | Day 1 | Day 69 | Evicted |
| 13 | Sanam | Day 1 | Day 63 | Evicted |
| 14 | Samyuktha | Day 1 | Day 56 | Evicted |
| 15 | Suchitra | Day 28 | Day 49 | Evicted |
| 16 | Suresh | Day 1 | Day 35 | Evicted |
| 17 | Velmurugan | Day 1 | Day 28 | Evicted |
| 18 | Rekha | Day 1 | Day 14 | Evicted |

== Housemates ==
The participants in the order of appearance and entry in house are:

=== Original entrants ===
- Rio Raj, a former television host on Star Vijay, also known for his acting roles in Saravanan Meenatchi (2016–2018) and Nenjamundu Nermaiyundu Odu Raja (2019).
- Sanam Shetty, an actress and model, known for winning the beauty pageant Miss South India 2016.
- Rekha Josephine Harris, an actress, known for acting in films such as Kadalora Kavithaigal (1986) and Punnagai Mannan (1986) and participating in the comedy-based cooking show, Cooku with Comali (3rd Runner-up)
- Balaji Murugadoss, a fitness model and entrepreneur, known for winning the beauty pageant Mister India International 2019.
- Anitha Sampath, an actress and television anchor best known for her stint on Sun News.
- Shivani Narayanan, an actress, known for acting roles in television series such as Pagal Nilavu (2016–2019) and Rettai Roja (2019–2020).
- Jithan Ramesh, the brother of Jiiva, an actor, appeared in the films Jithan (2005) and Osthe (2011).
- Velmurugan, a playback singer, known for singing many popular Tamil folk songs.
- Aari Arujunan, an actor, known for acting in the films Nedunchaalai (2014) and Maya (2015).
- Somshekar, a model and mixed martial artist, known for appearing in some frames of films such as Velaiilla Pattadhari 2 (2017), and Soorarai Pottru (2020).
- Gabriella Charlton, a dancer and former child artist, known for acting in films such as 3 (2012) and Appa (2016).
- Aranthangi Nisha, a stand-up comedian known for participating in the show Kalakka Povathu Yaaru 5 (Runner-up) and acting in films such as Maari 2 (2018) and Kalakalappu 2 (2018).
- Ramya Pandian, an actress, known for acting in films such as Aan Devathai (2018), and Joker (2016) and participating in the comedy-based cooking show, Cooku with Comali (2nd Runner-up)
- Samyuktha Shanmuganathan, a model turned actress known for winning the beauty pageant Miss Chennai 2007, acting in the television series Chandrakumari (2018), and in films such as Oolu, Dhanusu Raasi Neyargale (2019), and Tughlaq Darbar (2021).
- Suresh Chakravarthi, an actor, former television host, and entrepreneur, known for Chinna Papa Periya Papa and also directing the reality show Pepsi Ungal Choice.
- Aajeedh Khalique, a playback singer, known for winning the reality show Airtel Super Singer Junior 3.

=== Wildcard entrants ===
- Archana Chandhoke, a senior television host, known for hosting shows such as Namma Veetu Kalyanam, Super Mom and Sa Re Ga Ma Pa Lil Champs.
- Suchitra Ramadurai, a playback singer, radio jockey and dubbing artist, who has sung many Tamil songs.

== Special episodes ==
| Week(s) | Title | Date | Guest(s) | Notes |
|---|---|---|---|---|
| 4 | Bigg Boss – Navratri Special | 26 October 2020 | None | To celebrate the festival with the housemates; Three-hour episode |
| 5 | Bigg Boss – Kamal Haasan Birthday Celebration Special | 7 November 2020 | Shruti Haasan, Akshara Haasan, Mohanlal, Charuhasan, Nagarjuna, Suhasini Maniratnam and Anu Hassan | To wish Kamal Hassan Happy Birthday |
| 6 | Bigg Boss – Diwali Special | 14 November 2020 | None | To celebrate the festival of Diwali with the all housemates; Two-hour episode |
| 12 | Bigg Boss – Christmas Special | 24–25 December 2020 | Christmas choir group | To celebrate the festival of Christmas with the all housemates |
| 15 | Bigg Boss – Pongal | 14 January 2021 | Ex-contestants | To celebrate the festival of Pongal with the all housemates |

== Prison ==
Each week, two housemates who did not perform well in the Luxury Budget Task, are sent to the Bigg Boss Prison. The cell does not include the luxury facilities which are in the house. It contains a metal cot, another bed on the floor.

| Week | In Prison | | Day(s) |
|---|---|---|---|
| 1 | None | | None |
| 2 | Ramesh | Shivani | Day 12 |
| 3 | Aari | Aajeedh | Day 19 |
| 4 | Aari | Anitha | Day 26 |
| 5 | None | | None |
| 6 | None | | None |
| 7 | Bala | Suchitra | Day 47 |
| 8 | Aari | Rio | Day 54 |
| 9 | None | | None |
| 10 | Ramesh | Anitha | Day 67 |
| 10 | Nisha | | Day 69 |
| 11 | Gabriella | Shivani | Day 74 |
| 12 | Aajeedh | Gabriella | Day 81 |
| 13 | Aari | Balaji | Day 89 |
| 14 | None | | None |
| 15 | None | | None |

Female housemates Male housemates

== Hamam caller of the week ==
Since Week 9, Bigg Boss is letting its sponsor Hamam choose a caller from the audience, who then chooses and virtually questions a contestant regarding the game. The selected housemate can't refuse to answer the caller, each week the caller will change and be randomly selected from the public.

| Week | Receiver |
|---|---|
| 9 | Shivani Narayan |
| 10 | Pranesh Salunke |
| 11 | Somshekar |
| 12 | Aari Arjunan |
| 13 | Ramya Pandian |
| 14 | Aari Arjunan |
| 15 | Ramya Pandian |

== Nominations faced ==
| Number | Contestant | Total |
|---|---|---|
| 1 | Aari | 11 |
| 2 | Anitha | 9 |
| 3 | Som Shekar | 8 |
| 4 | Shivani | 7 |
| 5 | Aajeeth | 7 |
| 6 | Balaji | 6 |
| 7 | Ramya | 6 |
| 8 | Gabriella | 5 |
| 9 | Rio | 4 |
| 10 | Nisha | 4 |
| 11 | Ramesh | 3 |
| 12 | Samyuktha | 3 |
| 13 | Suresh | 3 |
| 14 | Archana | 2 |
| 15 | Suchithra | 1 |
| 16 | Velmurugan | 1 |
| 17 | Rekha | 1 |

== Celebrations ==
=== Navratri ===
On Day 22, the housemates in the Bigg Boss House celebrated the festival Navratri (Vijayadasami), in which the contestants cooked a feast, played village games, danced to songs, and decorated the Bigg Boss House. The episode was also extended to four hours, from the usual one hour. Starting at 6:30 pm rather than the usual 9:30 pm. The events are presented by Anitha.

Each housemate is given a plain golu doll to be painted and used for Navratri celebrations. At afternoon, the housemates are divided into two teams one is City team and the other is Village team and are given ingredients for the cooking competition. So as each team cooks a dish for the celebration. The cooking competition was judged by Anitha.

The cooking competition was won by City team. Then there were frames placed in the living room and garden area each one for City team and village team respectively, so that each person can stand back of the frame and express their wishes to their family members. It was continued by seven stones with the same team. The winner of seven stones is again City team. Then the male contestants are asked to praise the women contestants of the house. It is followed by the pooja of Navaratri. Then the contestants were asked express their talents on the stage placed in the garden area. At midnight, everyone sits around the Bonfire and plays Dumb Charades. In this game a player in a team is given a chit with a song name and are asked to act related to the terms in the chit so that their teammates find the song in the chit. The Village team won the Dumb Charades.

| Team | Housemates | Dishes | Seven Stones Result | Dumb Charades Result |
|---|---|---|---|---|
| City (நகர்புறம்) | Sanam (Cook) | Payasam (Winner) | Winner | Loser (Points: 3) |
| City (நகர்புறம்) | Balaji (cook) | Payasam (Winner) | Winner | Loser (Points: 3) |
| City (நகர்புறம்) | Ramesh | Payasam (Winner) | Winner | Loser (Points: 3) |
| City (நகர்புறம்) | Ramya | Payasam (Winner) | Winner | Loser (Points: 3) |
| City (நகர்புறம்) | Aajeedh | Payasam (Winner) | Winner | Loser (Points: 3) |
| City (நகர்புறம்) | Somshekar | Payasam (Winner) | Winner | Loser (Points: 3) |
| City (நகர்புறம்) | Shivani | Payasam (Winner) | Winner | Loser (Points: 3) |
| City (நகர்புறம்) | None | Payasam (Winner) | Winner | Loser (Points: 3) |
| Village (கிராமப்புறம்) | Suresh (Cook) | Kesari (Loser) | Loser | Winner (Points: 100) |
| Village (கிராமப்புறம்) | Archana (cook) | Kesari (Loser) | Loser | Winner (Points: 100) |
| Village (கிராமப்புறம்) | Nisha | Kesari (Loser) | Loser | Winner (Points: 100) |
| Village (கிராமப்புறம்) | Velmurugan | Kesari (Loser) | Loser | Winner (Points: 100) |
| Village (கிராமப்புறம்) | Gabriella | Kesari (Loser) | Loser | Winner (Points: 100) |
| Village (கிராமப்புறம்) | Aari | Kesari (Loser) | Loser | Winner (Points: 100) |
| Village (கிராமப்புறம்) | Samyuktha | Kesari (Loser) | Loser | Winner (Points: 100) |
| Village (கிராமப்புறம்) | Rio | Kesari (Loser) | Loser | Winner (Points: 100) |

=== Kamal Haasan birthday ===
On Day 34, Kamal Haasan celebrated his birthday with housemates. On this day Bigg Boss Tamil and Bigg Boss Telugu had a virtual crossover where the Telugu and Tamil housemates and the hosts Kamal Haasan and Nagarjuna meet each other.

=== Diwali ===
The housemates in Bigg Boss Tamil had a pre–Diwali Celebration, in which all the housemates participated in activities and games.

- Events on Day 36
  - The nomination process was cancelled due to the celebration of Diwali throughout Week 6 in the Bigg Boss House. On Day 36, the housemates were split into two groups, Kambi Mathappu and Busvaanam, and played a game called Ippove Kanna Kattudhe, in which the housemates had to put their forehead on a metal pole and go around the pole for ten rounds, after which they have to run and touch the wall, before arriving at the starting place. The Busvaanam team won the round. The housemates were then told to write a letter about someone they loved, and had to share the letter with the other housemates on a platform located in the Garden Area.
- Events on Day 38
  - All the housemates need to get in a pair, one of the housemates in the pair has to stand on a rock while the other housemate drags them across to the finish line as soon as possible where their time will be recorded. The pair with the fastest time will win the task. Balaji and Shivani were selected as the winners of the task
- Events on Day 39
  - The housemates gathered in the activity room, where the former Bigg Boss 2 and Bigg Boss 3 housemates had a virtual meet with the current Bigg Boss housemates. The former housemates conducted activities in which the current housemates participated. After the participation of all the housemates, Samyuktha, Balaji, Ramya, Archana, Aari, Anitha, and Aajeedh were selected as the winners of the task and received prizes.
- Events on Day 40
  - The housemates were given a day off from their respective house duties due to Diwali. The housemates were involved in many activities, including a dinner feast, a dance celebration, prize giveaways, amongst other tasks.

=== Christmas ===
The housemates in Bigg Boss Tamil had a Christmas Celebration, in which all the housemates participated in activities and games.

- Events on Day 81
  - A Christmas choir group came to perform Christmas songs to the housemates on Christmas Eve.
- Events on Day 82
  - A new bunch of Christmas choir group came to perform. All the housemates receive presents on Christmas day.

=== Freeze task ===
On Week 13, family members of the housemates entered the BB house as part of luxury budget task (Freeze Task).

- Day 86
1. Shivani's mother Akila Narayanan entered the BB house as part of Freeze Task.
2. Balaji's brother Ramesh entered the BB house as part of Freeze Task
- Day 87
1. Ramya's mother, Shanthi Duraipandian, and her brother, Parasu Pandian, entered the BB house as part of Freeze task.
2. Rio's wife Shruthi Rio entered the BB house as part of Freeze task. Rio's mother, mother-in-law and other family members along with friends were shown in the video clip.
3. Somshekar's brother Lathesh entered the BB house as part of Freeze Task. Som's mother and family members were shown in video clip along with his pet dog.
- Day 88
1. Gabriella's mother Sunitha entered the BB house as part of Freeze Task.
2. Aajeedh's mother Shabana Begum and his sister Shama entered the BB house as part of Freeze Task.
3. Aari's wife Nadhiya and his daughter Riya entered the BB house as part of Freeze Task.

=== Pongal ===
On Day 102 the housemates in Bigg Boss Tamil had a Pongal Celebration, in which all the housemates participated in activities and games.

- Events on Day 102
  - The housemates will be divided into two teams to play the special games. There were games like Uriyadi and Slow Cycle Race which all the housemates participated in...oops.

=== Bigg Boss finale ===
On Day 105, all the 13 evicted and walked housemates (Rekha, Velmurugan, Suresh, Suchitra, Samyuktha, Sanam, Ramesh, Nisha, Archana, Anitha, Aajeedh, Shivani, and Gabriella) were invited to the Bigg Boss Finale. Some of the housemates performed dance and singing performances on the show. At the end of the show, Aari Arjunan was then declared the Winner of Bigg Boss 4, followed by Balaji Murugadoss, Rio Raj, Ramya Pandian, and Somshekar.

== Weekly summary ==
The main events in the house are summarized in the table below. A typical week begins with nominations, followed by the luxury budget task, captaincy task, and then the eviction of a housemate during the Saturday and Sunday episodes. Tasks, evictions, and other events for a particular week are noted in order of sequence. After every event in each week, the days will be noted, too. For the detailed summary, please expand below

| Week | Context | Description |
|---|---|---|
| Week 1 | Entrances | Rio, Sanam, Rekha, Balaji, Anitha, Shivani, Ramesh, Velmurugan, Aari, Somshekar, Gabriella, Nisha, Ramya, Samyuktha, Suresh, and Aajeedh entered the Bigg Boss House on Day 1. |
| Week 1 | Captaincy task | Day 1: All housemates had to catch balls falling from the Bigg Boss House roof in 1 minute. As Ramya was the only contestant who did not catch a ball, she was directly selected as the House Captain of Week 1 |
| Week 1 | Captaincy Task Results | |
| Week 1 | Winner: Ramya | |
| Week 1 | Defeat: The other housemates | |
| Week 1 | House Captain | Day 1: Ramya was the House Captain of Week 1. |
| Week 1 | Nominations | None |
| Week 1 | Luxury Budget Tasks | Day 2 to 5: Housemates of the Bigg Boss House shared their past life, their sorrows, strengths, and how they achieved their dreams, with the other housemates. Suresh was initially shortlisted for the eviction process. However, he was saved from the eviction after he became the House Captain of Week 2. |
| Week 1 | Captaincy Task | Day 7: Rekha, Shivani, and Suresh got the most heartbreaks in the Heart Challenge Task in Week 1. The other housemates had to vote for the most deserving person amongst them. As Suresh received the most votes, he became the House Captain of Week 2. |
| Week 1 | Captaincy Task Results | |
| Week 1 | Winner: Suresh | |
| Week 1 | Defeat: Rekha | |
| Week 1 | Defeat: Shivani | |
| Week 1 | Eviction | There was no Eviction on Week 1. |
| Week 2 | Entrances | Day 11: Archana Chandhoke entered the Bigg Boss house as a Wildcard contestant. |
| Week 2 | House Captain | Suresh was the House Captain of Week 2. |
| Week 2 | Nominations | Day 8: The shortlisted contestants Aajeedh, Gabriella, Ramya, Rekha, Samyuktha, Sanam, and Shivani were nominated for Week 2's eviction process. As Suresh became the House Captain of Week 2, he was granted immunity from the nomination process. |
| Week 2 | Twists | Day 8: For the first time in the history of Bigg Boss, the housemates who were nominated for Week 2's eviction process, and the House Captain Suresh, were sent to a separate room and were instructed by Bigg Boss to select a person among themselves, who provides the best reason for why he/she is most eligible to stay in the Bigg Boss House. Subsequently, housemates who do not provide good reasons would be asked to leave the room. The last person present in the room would be awarded the Eviction–Free Pass, which can be used for any one nomination of the season. It is valid up to Week 10. Aajeedh received the Bigg Boss Eviction–Free Card, hence he can either use it to save himself or he can bestow it on another housemate to save him/her from the eviction process unless it had been stolen by the other housemates. Day 9: The housemates in the Bigg Boss House will have to perform a task, which involves them throwing balls. Housemates have to pair up and select one representative to throw a ball in a bowl located in the garden area. Then, the representative should select one of the housemates, to leave the game. Subsequently, as the housemates leave the game, the last person in the game, along with his/her pair, will receive immunity from Week 3's eviction process. Sanam and Velmurugan have won and received immunity from Week 3's eviction process |
| Week 2 | Luxury Budget Task | Day 10, 11: The housemates have to pair up with each other and dance on a stage platform located in the living room of the Bigg Boss House. The housemates will be asked to dance for a certain song, on a particular day. Rio, Gabriella and Velmurugan were selected as the best performers of the task, and were selected for the captaincy task for Week 3. |
| Week 2 | In Jail | Day 12: Ramesh and Shivani were sent to jail, due to the lack of involvement in most of the activities conducted. |
| Week 2 | Captaincy Task | Day 12: Three of the housemates should carry another housemate on their shoulders and the others should support the housemates participating in the task. Aari carried Velmurugan, Balaji carried Rio and Suresh carried Gabriella. |
| Week 2 | Captaincy Task Results | |
| Week 2 | Winner: Rio | |
| Week 2 | Defeat: Velmurugan | |
| Week 2 | Defeat: Gabriella | |
| Week 2 | Real and Fake Task | Day 13: The contestants were told to give a contestant, who they feel is being fake, a mask and who they feel is being real, a badge with the slogan "அகமே முகம்" |
| Week 2 | Safe from eviction | Day 13: Aajeedh, Shivani, Ramya, Gabriella, Samyuktha, and Sanam received enough public votes to stay in the competition and they were safe. |
| Week 2 | Eviction | Day 14 Rekha Josephine was evicted from the house after facing the public vote |
| Week 3 | Entrances | None |
| Week 3 | House Captain | Rio was the House Captain of Week 3. |
| Week 3 | Nominations | Day 15: Aajeedh, Aari, Anitha, Balaji, and Suresh were nominated for Week 3's eviction process. |
| Week 3 | Truth or Dare task | Day 15: The contestants were given truth or dare as a daily task by Bigg Boss. Each housemate needs to ask other housemates if they would like to do the truth or a dare with a valid reason. |
| Week 3 | Luxury Budget Tasks | Hell or Heaven Task: One person from Heaven will have to face members from Hell. Members from Hell should torture the person from Heaven either by laughing or by the movement of their body.: When the First Conch sound is heard, one person should be selected from Heaven.; When the Second Conch sound is heard, the selected person should face the members from Hell.; The selected person from Heaven should not move or laugh until the Last Conch sound is heard.; If they win, they will return to Heaven, or else, they will be enslaved in Hell.; Balaji, Archana, and Sanam were selected as the best performers of the task, and were selected for the captaincy task for Week 4. |
| Week 3 | Daily Tasks | Day 18: Bigg Boss gives a task to Somshekar to teach housemates about mixed martial arts Bigg Boss Pattimandram the contestants were divided into two teams, one team had to say why the Bigg Boss contestants are like family and the other saying why this show is a competition and no one is like family and everyone is their rivals. |
| Week 3 | Daily Tasks | Parcel Task Each housemate's had to pass a parcel before a song ended, if the song ended and if the parcel was in one of the housemate's hands they would be out of the task and would give another housemate who is still in the game a heavy punishment.: Suresh emerged as the winner of the task while Samyuktha came in second. |
| Week 3 | Ranking Task | Day 19: Each housemate has to rank each other from 1 to 16. The person who is ranked number 1 will be the most favoured to win the season. |
| Week 3 | In Jail | Day 19: Aajeedh and Aari were sent to jail, due to the lack of involvement in most of the activities conducted. |
| Week 3 | Tick Task | Day 20: Kamal Hassan asked the housemates to tick one of the housemate's pictures whom they want to evict and tick another picture of another housemate whom they want to save from eviction from the list of contestants who were nominated this week. |
| Week 3 | Captaincy Task | Day 21: Kamal Hassan told the housemates to select the captain by voting, Balaji and Sanam received fewer votes than Archana |
| Week 3 | Captaincy Task Results | |
| Week 3 | Winner: Archana | |
| Week 3 | Defeat: Sanam | |
| Week 3 | Defeat: Balaji | |
| Week 3 | Safe from eviction | Day 20, 21: Balaji, Aari, Suresh, and Anitha were saved from eviction after receiving enough public votes to continue in the game.; Aajeedh used his eviction free-pass to save himself from eviction |
| Week 3 | Eviction | Day 21: Initially, Aajeedh was to be evicted from the Bigg Boss House. However, as Aajeedh used the Eviction–Free Pass to escape from eviction, the eviction process on Week 3 was canceled. |
| Week 4 | Entrances | Day 28: Suchitra entered the Bigg Boss house as a Wildcard contestant. |
| Week 4 | House Captain | Archana was the House Captain of Week 4. |
| Week 4 | Nominations | Day 22: Aajeedh, Anitha, Balaji, Nisha, Ramesh, Ramya, Rio, Sanam, Somshekar, Suresh and Velmurugan were nominated for Week 4's eviction process. |
| Week 4 | Navratri Tasks | Day 22: All housemates are given plain golu dolls to be painted and used for Navratri celebrations.; In the afternoon, the housemates are divided into two teams one is the City team and the other is the Village team, and are given ingredients for the cooking competition. So as each team cooks a dish for the celebration.; The cooking competition was judged by Anitha. The cooking competition was won by the City team.; There were frames placed in the Living Room and Garden area each one for the City team and Village team respectively so that each person can stand behind the frame and express their wishes to their family members.; It was continued by Seven stones with the same team. The winner of seven stones is again the City team.; The male contestants are asked to praise the women contestants of the House.; It is followed by the pooja of Navaratri.; The contestants were asked to express their talents on the stage placed in the Garden area.; At midnight, everyone is made to sit around the Bonfire and played Dumb charades. In this game, a player in a team is given a chit with a song name and is asked to act related to the terms in the chit so that their teammates find the song in the chit. The Village Team won Dumb Charades. |
| Week 4 | Luxury Budget Task | Day 23: Bigg Boss gives a task to Balaji to teach housemates how to sing a folk song as part of Daily Task; The housemates of the Bigg Boss House are divided into groups consisting of four members. Each group is then sent to the Gold mine to collect the gold bars beneath the soil in a given amount of time. The winner of this task is the team that collects the greatest number of gold bars throughout the task.; The housemates were then told to rearrange themselves to form three groups. The previous results were not revealed to the other housemates. Day 24: As Balaji and his team won the task, the rest of the housemates were told to do chores for Balaji and his team on Day 24. Coincidentally, the House Captain Archana was in Balaji's team and was given a day–off from her captaincy on Day 24. |
| Week 4 | Evergreen Memories | Day 25: Each housemate has to share their emotional story about their loved ones to every housemate. |
| Week 4 | In Jail | Day 26: Aari and Anitha were sent to jail due to the lack of involvement in all the activities of the week. |
| Week 4 | Captaincy Task | Day 26: Originally, Nisha and Balaji were selected as the best performers of the Luxury Budget Task and were selected to compete for the House Captaincy. Somshekar was also selected as he was selected as the best performer for the whole of Week 4.; However, Ramya, who was in first place for the 1 to 16 arrangement task, had the power to swap any of the captaincy housemates with another housemate. As a result, Ramya swapped Nisha with Samyuktha as she felt that Samyuktha was responsible and sorted out problems without partiality.; Each housemate besides the captaincy nominees has to throw yellow balls to the nominees, the one with the most balls wins captaincy for week 5. Samyuktha played a safe game and Balaji has favored Sanyuktha to win the capitancy task, in which he broke the Big boss rules. |
| Week 4 | Captaincy Task Results | |
| Week 4 | Winner: Samyuktha | |
| Week 4 | Defeat: Somshekar | |
| Week 4 | Defeat: Balaji | |
| Week 4 | Prisma Fashion Task | Day 26: Each housemate has to dress up in an outfit sponsored by Prisma and do a Ramp Walk. There were pairs in ramp walk dance: 1. Archana and Suresh; 2. Samyuktha and Velmurugan; 3. Sanam and Ramesh; 4. Ramya and Aajeedh; 5. Rio and Nisha; 6. Gabriella and Somshekar; 7. Shivani and Balaji; Archana and Suresh were selected as Prisma Happy Couples |
| Week 4 | Safe from eviction | Day 27, 28: Sanam, Rio, Ramya, Balaji, Ramesh, Anitha, Somshekar, Aajeedh, Nisha, and Suresh received enough public votes to stay in the competition and they were safe. |
| Week 4 | Acting Task | Day 28: Each housemate has to do an act of their co-housemates. |
| Week 4 | Eviction | Day 28: Velmurugan was evicted from the house after facing the public vote. |
| Week 4 | Emoji Task | Day 28: The new wildcard entry Suchitra has to give each housemate an emoji face which suits their personality. |
| Week 5 | Entrances | None |
| Week 5 | House Captain | Samyuktha was the House Captain of Week 5. |
| Week 5 | Nominations | Day 29: Aari, Anitha, Archana, Balaji, Sanam, Somshekar, and Suresh were nominated for Week 5's eviction process. |
| Week 5 | Daily Task | Day 29 to 31, 33: Bigg Boss gives a task to Aajeedh to teach housemates how to sing a song, Shivani to teach housemates how to do nine different expressions "Navarasa", Suresh to teach housemates how to do Jothidam and Sanam to teach housemates how to dance |
| Week 5 | Luxury Budget Task | Day 30 to 32: Each housemate is asked to register their difference in opinion with the other housemates in a letter. The problems are then debated and concluded in the Court of this house and the Magistrate is Suchitra. Each housemate can support a person in the Defendant's cage either the Plaintiff or Defendant.: Magistrate / Plaintiff / Defendant / Favour; Suchitra / Aajeedh / None; Suchitra / Aari / Samyuktha / None; Suchitra / Anitha / None; Suchitra / Archana / None; Suchitra / Balaji / Sanam / Balaji; Suchitra / Gabriella / Suresh / Gabriella; Suchitra / Nisha / None; Suchitra / Ramesh / Somshekar / Ramesh; Suchitra / Ramya / None; Suchitra / Rio / Nisha / Nisha; Suchitra / Samyuktha / Aari / Samyuktha; Suchitra / Sanam / Balaji / None; Suchitra / Shivani / None / None; Suchitra / Somshekar / Balaji / Som; Suchitra / Suresh / Sanam / Sanam |
| Week 5 | RKG Cooking Task | Day 32: Each team has to pick two random items from different stations placed in the Bigg Boss Garden Area. After that, Team A and Team B must cook a recipe using the ingredients that they chose.: Team / Housemates / Result; Team A / Archana (Head Chef) / Winner; Team A / Nisha (Asst. Chief) / Winner; Team A / Balaji / Winner; Team A / Suchitra / Winner; Team A / Gabriella / Winner; Team A / Somshekar / Winner; Team A / Shivani / Winner; Team A / Aajeedh / Winner; Team B / Sanam (Head Chef) / Defeat; Team B / Anitha (Asst. Chief) / Defeat; Team B / Ramya / Defeat; Team B / Samyuktha / Defeat; Team B / Rio / Defeat; Team B / Suresh / Defeat; Team B / Ramesh / Defeat; Team B / Aari / Defeat |
| Week 5 | Bigg Boss FM station | Day 32: All the housemates have to perform a Bigg Boss Radio station. |
| Week 5 | In Jail | No housemates were sent to jail |
| Week 5 | Preethi Zodiac Task | Day 33: The housemates have to create a dish using the Preethi Cosmo Blender.: Team / Housemates / Result; Team 1 / Archana (Captain) / Winner; Team 1 / Somshekar / Winner; Team 1 / Aari / Winner; Team 2 / Ramya (Captain) / Defeat; Team 2 / Sanam / Defeat; Team 2 / Gabriella / Defeat; Team 3 / Suresh (Captain) / Defeat; Team 3 / Nisha / Defeat; Team 3 / Suchitra / Defeat; Archana, Suresh, and Ramya are the captains of this task. And each of them has to pick a member for their team |
| Week 5 | Captaincy Task | Day 33: The participants Aari, Nisha, and Som were tied with rope. They were supported by Balaji, Ramesh, and Rio respectively. Then, the participants were to untie themselves by running around a pillar, to which the rope is attached. The participant who unties themselves the fastest was to be declared the winner. |
| Week 5 | Captaincy Task Results | |
| Week 5 | Winner: Aari | |
| Week 5 | Defeat: Som | |
| Week 5 | Defeat: Nisha | |
| Week 5 | Bigg Boss Telugu Crossover episode | Day 34: Bigg Boss Telugu had a cross over episode with Bigg Boss Tamil to celebrate Kamal Hassan's birthday. |
| Week 5 | Safe from eviction | Day 35: Aari, Anitha, Archana, Balaji, Sanam, and Som received enough public votes to stay in the game. |
| Week 5 | Eviction | Day 35: Suresh Chakaravarthi was evicted from the house after facing the public vote. |
| Week 6 | Entrances | None |
| Week 6 | House Captain | Aari was the House Captain of Week 6. |
| Week 6 | Nominations | Initially everyone except Aari was nominated for the eviction, but as a part of Bigg Boss Tamil's first Diwali celebration, the Eviction process was canceled for a week. |
| Week 6 | Ippove Kanna Kattudhe Task | Day 36: The housemates had to put their forehead on a metal pole and go around the pole for ten rounds, after which they have to run and touch the wall, before arriving at the starting place. Aari is the judge of the task. The Busvaanam Team won the Task.: Kambi Mathappu Team (Anitha, Archana, Nisha, Ramesh, Rio, Somshekar, and Sanam) and; Busvaanam Team (Aajeedh, Balaji, Gabriella, Ramya, Samyuktha, Shivani, and Suchitra) |
| Week 6 | Letter to They're loved ones for Deepavali | Day 36: The housemates were then told to write a letter about a person they loved and had to share the letter with the other housemates on a platform located in the Garden Area. |
| Week 6 | Luxury Budget Task | Day 37, 38: Archana is head of the family.: She has two daughters [Sanam & Nisha] and two sons [Aari and Somshekar].; Suchitra and Ramya are daughters-in-law, Rio, Ramesh is sons-in-law, Aajeedh and Balaji are grandsons, Gabriella, Shivani are granddaughters.; Samyuktha is her servant, Anitha is Samyuktha's daughter.; Archana has been waiting for celebrating Diwali with her family members for many years. So, she decided to divide the property among her family members but with a condition: To make her happy and joyful. She will divide her property, which family gives more happiness to her will get the most valuable property.; Bigg Boss gave Secret Task to Som, Ramya, and Gabriella to open the locker and steal the property bond; One of the Family members should safeguard the locker daily on a routine basis; Bigg Boss canceled the task due to violating the game rules and there are no luxury budget points allocated for this week |
| Week 6 | Deepavali task | Day 38: All the housemates formed pairs, one housemate in each pair has to stand on a rock while the other housemate drags them across to the finish line as soon as possible where their time will be recorded. The pair with the fastest time will win the task. Balaji and Shivani were selected as the winners of the task |
| Week 6 | In Jail | None |
| Week 6 | Captaincy Task | Day 40: The participants Aajeedh, Nisha, and Gabriella have to collect the coins by breaking the balloon, the gatherer of maximum numbers of coins is the winner. |
| Week 6 | Captaincy Task Results | |
| Week 6 | Winner: Aajeedh | |
| Week 6 | Defeat: Nisha | |
| Week 6 | Defeat: Gabriella | |
| Week 6 | Fire crackers task | Day 41: Each housemate has to say that one fire cracker suits one housemate. This is a Diwali special task. |
| Week 6 | Safe from eviction | None |
| Week 6 | Eviction | Eviction process was cancelled due to Diwali Celebration. |
| Week 7 | Entrances | None |
| Week 7 | House Captain | Aajeedh was the House Captain of Week 7. |
| Week 7 | Nominations | Day 43: Aari, Anitha, Balaji, Rio, Samyuktha, Somshekar and Suchitra were nominated for Week 7's eviction process. |
| Week 7 | Dialogue Task | Day 43: Each housemate has to pick up a random dialogue from a jar and give it to a housemate which suits them best. |
| Week 7 | Daily Tasks | TBA |
| Week 7 | Luxury Budget Task | Day 44 to 46: All housemates are divided into a team of three members and are asked to calculate the time for three hours. One has to act as an Hour hand, the second, a Minute hand and the last must check whether the housemates are following the timetable (அட்டவணை). The housemates have to live the life of an ordinary person during the task. The winner of the task is the one whose time calculated in the house matches close to the actual time.: Team / Housemates / Calculated Time Interval / / / Total Difference / Result; Team / Housemates / Round 1 / Round 2 / Round 3 / Total Difference / Result; Team 1 / Anitha / 3 Hours 18 Minutes / 4 Hours 27 Minutes / 3 Hours 38 Minutes / 2 Hours 23 Minutes / Defeat; Team 1 / Nisha / 3 Hours 18 Minutes / 4 Hours 27 Minutes / 3 Hours 38 Minutes / 2 Hours 23 Minutes / Defeat; Team 1 / Sanam / 3 Hours 18 Minutes / 4 Hours 27 Minutes / 3 Hours 38 Minutes / 2 Hours 23 Minutes / Defeat; Team 2 / Balaji / 4 Hours 12 Minutes / 1 Hour 26 Minutes / 2 Hour 42 Minutes / 3 Hours 4 Minutes / Defeat; Team 2 / Suchitra / 4 Hours 12 Minutes / 1 Hour 26 Minutes / 2 Hour 42 Minutes / 3 Hours 4 Minutes / Defeat; Team 2 / Ramya / 4 Hours 12 Minutes / 1 Hour 26 Minutes / 2 Hour 42 Minutes / 3 Hours 4 Minutes / Defeat; Team 3 / Rio / 3 Hours 1 Minute / 3 Hours 31 Minutes / 3 Hours 29 Minutes / 1 Hour 1 Minute / Best Single Round Score; Team 3 / Aari / 3 Hours 1 Minute / 3 Hours 31 Minutes / 3 Hours 29 Minutes / 1 Hour 1 Minute / Best Single Round Score; Team 3 / Gabriella / 3 Hours 1 Minute / 3 Hours 31 Minutes / 3 Hours 29 Minutes / 1 Hour 1 Minute / Best Single Round Score; Team 4 / Somshekar / 3 Hours 8 Minutes / 3 Hours 4 Minutes / 3 Hours 6 Minutes / 18 Minutes / Winner; Team 4 / Samyuktha / 3 Hours 8 Minutes / 3 Hours 4 Minutes / 3 Hours 6 Minutes / 18 Minutes / Winner; Team 4 / Archana / 3 Hours 8 Minutes / 3 Hours 4 Minutes / 3 Hours 6 Minutes / 18 Minutes / Winner; Team 5 / Shivani / 3 Hours 13 Minutes / 3 Hours 24 Minutes / 3 Hours 19 Minutes / 56 Minutes / First runner-up; Team 5 / Aajeedh / 3 Hours 13 Minutes / 3 Hours 24 Minutes / 3 Hours 19 Minutes / 56 Minutes / First runner-up; Team 5 / Ramesh / 3 Hours 13 Minutes / 3 Hours 24 Minutes / 3 Hours 19 Minutes / 56 Minutes / First runner-up |
| Week 7 | Vinatge task | Day 44: Each housemate has to act an old vintage scene. |
| Week 7 | Ghost task | Day 44: Ramya, Gabriella, and Rio are the ghosts of the house. From 2:00 AM to 2:30 AM the ghosts will roam around the house and scare the other housemates. This task is to distract the team which is doing the luxury budget task. |
| Week 7 | Yamaha Motorbike Task | Day 46: Each male housemate has to impress a female housemate and bring her for a drive on the Yamaha motorbike.: Female / Male; Shivani / Somshekar; Ramya / Rio; Gabriella - Winner / Aajeedh - Winner; Samyuktha / Balaji; Archana, Aari, and Sanam are the judges; Aajeedh and Gabriella were the winner Jodi |
| Week 7 | Envelope Task | Day 46: Each housemate has to open an envelope, in each envelope, there will be a task to complete and a food item reward. If the housemate fails the task, the food item will not be awarded but if they complete the task, the food item will be awarded.: Housemates / Food Item Reward / Time of completion / Results; Archana / Fish / Timed Up / Failed; Balaji / Falooda / 00:08 sec / Passed; Gabriella / Chicken Fried Rice / Timed Up / Failed; Anitha / Chicken Wings / 00:34 sec / Passed; Rio / Parotta Chicken Kalaki / 00:10 sec / Passed; Aajeedh / Parotta Chicken Kalaki / 00:10 sec / Passed; Somshekar / Parotta Chicken Kalaki / 00:10 sec / Passed; Balaji / Parotta Chicken Kalaki / 00:10 sec / Passed; Aari / Parotta Chicken Kalaki / 00:10 sec / Passed; Ramesh / Parotta Chicken Kalaki / 00:10 sec / Passed; indicates that the food item was not rewarded. indicates that the food item was rewarded. indicates that the housemate completed the task within time. indicates that the housemate didn't manage to complete the task within time. indicates that the housemate failed the task. indicates that the housemate passed the task. |
| Week 7 | In Jail | Day 47: Balaji and Suchitra were sent to jail, due to the lack of involvement in most of the activities conducted. |
| Week 7 | Captaincy Task | Day 47: The participants Somshekar, Samyuktha, Archana, Rio, Aari, and Gabriella are asked to hold a wooden plank with a block representing their photos and names. At frequent buzzers, participants are asked to walk to and fro across the room. Som, Archana, Samyuktha, Gabriella, and Aari lost in the task whilst Rio won the task. Hence, Rio was selected as the Week 8 Captain. |
| Week 7 | Captaincy Task Results | |
| Week 7 | Winner: Rio | |
| Week 7 | Defeat: Aari | |
| Week 7 | Defeat: Somshekar | |
| Week 7 | Defeat: Gabriella | |
| Week 7 | Defeat: Samyuktha | |
| Week 7 | Defeat: Archana | |
| Week 7 | Hyundai Sponsor Task | Day 47: Hyundai had launched the new Hyundai i20 in the Bigg Boss House. Each housemate has to get into a pair and do a photoshoot promoting the new launched car.: Gabriella, Aajeedh and Shivani were the judges.; Pairs: Ramya / Somshekar; Ramesh / Archana; Samyuktha / Aari; Sanam / Anitha; Rio / Nisha; indicates that the pair were the winners.: Aari and Samyuktha were the winners of the photoshoot. |
| Week 7 | Coo coo Task | Day 48:, each housemate has to act like a coo coo bird and say something secret about each housemate. |
| Week 7 | Boxing Glove Task | Day 48:, each housemate has to give a boxing glove to a positive housemate by their choice, and the other glove to who they think is a strong housemate. |
| Week 7 | Safe from eviction | Day 48, 49: Aari, Rio, Balaji, Somshekar, Samyuktha, and Anitha received enough public votes to stay in the competition and they were safe. |
| Week 7 | Eviction | Day 49: Suchitra Ramadurai was evicted from the house after facing the public vote. |
| Week 8 | Entrances | None |
| Week 8 | House Captain | Rio was the House Captain of Week 8. |
| Week 8 | Nominations | Day 50: Aari, ~~Anitha~~, Balaji, Nisha, Ramesh, Samyuktha, Sanam and Somshekar were nominated for Week 8's eviction process. |
| Week 8 | Nomination Topple Task | Day 50: Among seven nominated contestants have to choose one person, who was not nominated in the initial process. They should decide among themselves, who deserve to stay inside the house by saving him/her from eviction.; Anitha has won the task and she directly nominated Samyuktha in order to save herself from eviction. |
| Week 8 | Luxury Budget Task | Day 51 to 54: Call center Task, housemates are divided into separate groups and some housemates are callers. The housemate who calls has to say something to the caller given by Bigg Boss if they don't manage to complete the task, that housemate is nominated for 10th week eviction process. Task Results: Call Center Worker / Customer / Result; Balaji / Archana / Archana could not finish the task. She was nominated for the next week's eviction process.; Samyuktha / Sanam / Sanam could not finish the task. She was nominated for the next week's eviction process.; Gabriella / Somshekar / Somshekar finished his task when Gabriella cut the call.; Ramesh / Ramya / Ramya could not finish the task. She was nominated for the next week's eviction process.; Aajeedh / Rio / Rio finished his task when Aajeedh cut the call.; Shivani / Aari / Aari could not finish the task. He was nominated for the next week's eviction process.; Anitha / Nisha / Nisha could not finish the task. She was nominated for the next week's eviction process. |
| Week 8 | In Jail | Day 54: Rio and Aari were sent to jail, due to the lack of involvement in most of the activities conducted. |
| Week 8 | Captaincy Task | Day 57: Balaji, Ramesh and Ramya were nominated for next week's captaincy task. |
| Week 8 | Captaincy Task Results | |
| Week 8 | Winner: Ramesh | |
| Week 8 | Defeat: Balaji | |
| Week 8 | Defeat: Ramya | |
| Week 8 | Safe from eviction | Day 55, 56: Aari, Balaji, Nisha, Ramesh, Sanam, and Somshekar received enough public votes to stay in the competition and they were safe. |
| Week 8 | Eviction | Day 56: Samyuktha Shanmuganathan was evicted from the house after facing the public vote. |
| Week 9 | Entrances | None |
| Week 9 | House Captain | Ramesh was the House Captain of Week 9 |
| Week 9 | Nominations | Day 57:Aajeedh, Aari, Anitha, Nisha, Ramya, Sanam, Shivani were nominated for week 9. |
| Week 9 | Daily Tasks | |
| Week 9 | Luxury Budget Task | Day 58, 59:Call center Task continues, housemates are divided into groups and some housemates are callers. The housemate who calls has to say something to the caller given by Bigg Boss if they don't manage to complete the task that housemate gets nominated for next week eviction process. Task Results: Call Center Worker / Customer / Result; Archana / Aajeedh / Aajeedh finished his task when Archana cut the call.; Somshekar / Gabriella / Gabriella finished her task when Somshekar cut the call.; Aari / Balaji / Balaji could not finish the task. He was nominated for the next week's eviction process.; Rio / Anitha / Anitha could not finish the task. She was nominated for the next week's eviction process.; Ramya / Shivani / Shivani could not finish the task. She was nominated for the next week's eviction process.; Nisha / Ramesh / Ramesh finished her task when Nisha cut the call. |
| Week 9 | In Jail | None |
| Week 9 | Captaincy Task | Day 64: All housemates had to pair up and stand in front of a TV screen. An image will be shown on the screen. Ten seconds later, the image will be removed. Questions will be asked to the pair in front of the TV based on the image given. |
| Week 9 | Captaincy Task Results | |
| Week 9 | Winner: Anitha | |
| Week 9 | Defeat: The Other housemates | |
| Week 9 | Safe from eviction | Day 62, 63: Aajeedh, Aari, Anitha, Nisha, Ramya, and Shivani received enough public votes to stay in the competition and they were safe. |
| Week 9 | Eviction | Sanam Shetty was evicted from the house after facing the public vote. |
| Week 10 | Entrances | None |
| Week 10 | House Captain | Anitha |
| Week 10 | Nominations | Day 64: Originally, Aari, Archana, Balaji, Nisha, Ramya, and Shivani were nominated for the Week 10 Eviction Process.; However, after Aari, Archana, and Balaji received the power to swap a housemate with themselves, Aari swapped himself with Ramesh, Balaji swapped himself with Gabriella, and Archana swapped herself with Somshekar.; Later, Gabriella, Nisha, Ramesh, Ramya, Shivani, and Somshekar were nominated for the Week 10 Eviction Process. |
| Week 10 | Daily Tasks | TBA |
| Week 10 | Luxury Budget Task | Day 65 to 67: Human versus Robot Task, housemates are divided into two teams. Robots should do all task given by Humans. Humans should bring out two emotions from Robots to shutdown them. If humans are unable to convert the robots, one of the humans will turn into a robot. Round 1: Human Team: Balaji (head), Rio, Nisha, Anitha, Aari, and Aajeedh; Robot Team: Archana (head), Somshekar, Gabriella, Ramesh, Ramya, and Shivani; First Phase of the Task was completed, the Human team won the task.; Round 2: Robot Team: Balaji(Head), Rio, Nisha, Anitha, Aari and Aajeedh; Human Team: Archana(Head), Somshekar, Gabriella, Ramesh, Ramya, and Shivani; Second Phase of the Task was completed, the Human team won the task. |
| Week 10 | In Jail | Day 67, 69: Anitha and Ramesh were sent to jail, due to the lack of involvement in most of the activities conducted.; Nisha was sent to jail by Kamal Haasan for being the worst performer of the week. |
| Week 10 | Captaincy Task | Day 68: Balaji, Ramya and Nisha were nominated for next week's captaincy task. |
| Week 10 | Captaincy Task Results | |
| Week 10 | Winner: Ramya | |
| Week 10 | Defeat: Balaji | |
| Week 10 | Defeat: Nisha | |
| Week 10 | Safe from eviction | Day 69, 70: Ramya, Somshekar, Shivani and Gabriella received enough votes to continue the game. |
| Week 10 | Double Eviction | Day 69, 70: Jithan Ramesh and Aranthangi Nisha were evicted from the house after facing the public vote, due to groupism of "Anbu gang". |
| Week 11 | Entrances | none |
| Week 11 | House Captain | Ramya was the House Captain of Week 11 |
| Week 11 | First Open Nominations | Aajeedh, Aari, Anitha, Archana, Rio, Shivani, and Somshekar were nominated for the Week 11 Eviction Process. |
| Week 11 | Daily Tasks | none |
| Week 11 | Luxury Budget Task | Day 71-73: Two housemates need to be a chicken and protect their golden eggs from being harmed by the foxes which are the other housemates. Whoever performs the best will receive a special power at the end.: Balaji was the best performer and received a special power. |
| Week 11 | In Jail | Day 74: Gabriella and Shivani were sent to jail, due to the lack of involvement in most of the activities conducted. |
| Week 11 | Captaincy Task | Day 75: Archana, Balaji and Ramya participated in the captaincy task |
| Week 11 | Captaincy Task Results | |
| Week 11 | Winner: Archana | |
| Week 11 | Defeat: Ramya | |
| Week 11 | Defeat: Balaji | |
| Week 11 | Safe from eviction | Day 76, 77: Rio, Aari, Shivani, Anitha, Aajeedh and Somshekar received enough votes to continue the game. |
| Week 11 | Eviction | Day 77: Archana Chandhoke was evicted from the house after facing the public vote. |
| Week 12 | Entrances | None |
| Week 12 | House Captain | Balaji became the House Captain of Week 12 after he was selected by Archana, who was to be House Captain of Week 12 |
| Week 12 | Nominations | Aari, Aajeedh, Anitha, Gabriella and Shivani were nominated for the Week 12 Eviction Process. |
| Week 12 | Are U Caught? | Day 78: Each housemate has to verse another housemate in a hand competition, the losing housemate will then later draw a paper from the jar and will later be said to give one housemate the category the paper has got on it. |
| Week 12 | Daily Tasks | none |
| Week 12 | Luxury Budget Task | Day 79 to 81: All the housemates will be divided into 2 teams, each member from a team will need to catch a ball which comes down through a pipeline. The team member who catches the bowl will get 20 points for their team. Both teams should avoid catching a red ball which removes points of their team.: Team A / Team B; Somshekar / Aari; Ramya / Anitha; Rio / Shivani; Gabriella / Aajeedh; None / Balaji; indicates the In Charge of that team. Day 80: All the housemates need to play on their own. Whenever their name is called they need to come and get the ball which will later give them points if they miss it they will not receive any points. Day 81: When each housemate catches a golden ball they get to pick a special advantage which will be displayed on the board. |
| Week 12 | Luxury Budget Ranking Task | Day 80: Each housemate has to rank themselves with a valid reason of why they did good in the luxury budget task from 1 to 9 in order.: Rank / Contestants; 1 / Rio; 2 / Ramya; 3 / Somshekar; 4 / Balaji; 5 / Aari; 6 / Anitha; 7 / Aajeedh; 8 / Shivani; 9 / Gabriella; Rio, Ramya, and Somshekar will get a benefit power in the next round. |
| Week 12 | In Jail | Day 81: Aajeedh and Gabriella were sent to jail, due to the lack of involvement in most of the activities conducted. |
| Week 12 | Christmas Celebration | Day 81, 82: a group of choir members will sing a special Christmas song to the housemates to celebrate the festive season, during this time all the housemates receive special presents and exchange their gifts to other housemates too |
| Week 12 | Captaincy Task | Day 81: Rio, Aari and Somshekar are the contenders for the next week captaincy |
| Week 12 | Captaincy Task Results | |
| Week 12 | Winner: Aari | |
| Week 12 | Defeat: Rio | |
| Week 12 | Defeat: Somshekar | |
| Week 12 | Safe from eviction | Day 83, 84: Aari, Gabriella, Shivani and Aajeedh received enough votes to continue the game. |
| Week 12 | Eviction | Day 84: Anitha Sampath was evicted from the house after facing the public vote. |
| Week 13 | Guest Entrances | Day 86 to 88: Akila Narayanan (Shivani's mother), Ramesh ( Balaji's Brother); Shanthi and Parasu Pandian (Ramya's mother and brother), Shruthi (Rio's wife) and Lathesh (Somshekar's brother); Sunitha (Gabriella's mother), Shabana Begum and Shama (Aajeedh's mother and sister), Nadhiya and Riya (Aari Arjuna's wife and daughter) |
| Week 13 | House Captain | Aari was the House Captain of Week 13 |
| Week 13 | Second Open Nominations | Day 85: Aajeedh, Gabriella, Ramya, Shivani and Som were nominated for the Week 13 eviction process. |
| Week 13 | Luxury Budget Task | Day 86-88: Freeze or Release Task, Bigg boss will take full control over the task. He will instruct the housemates by using words like freeze, release, rewind, fast forward and loop |
| Week 13 | In Jail | Day 89: Aari and Balaji were sent to jail, due to the lack of involvement in most of the activities conducted. |
| Week 13 | Captaincy Task | Day 89: Rio, Aajeedh and Somshekar are the contenders for the next week captaincy |
| Week 13 | Captaincy Task Results | |
| Week 13 | Winner: Rio | |
| Week 13 | Defeat: Aajeedh | |
| Week 13 | Defeat: Somshekar | |
| Week 13 | Safe from eviction | Day 90, 91: Gabriella, Ramya, Shivani and Som received enough public votes to stay in the competition and they were safe. |
| Week 13 | Eviction | Day 91: Aajeedh Khalique was evicted from the house after facing the public vote. |
| Week 14 | Entrances | none |
| Week 14 | House Captain | Rio was the House Captain of Week 14 |
| Week 14 | Third Open Nominations | Day 92: Aari, Balaji, Gabriella, Ramya, Rio, Shivani and Somshekar were directly nominated for the Week 14 eviction process. |
| Week 14 | Daily Tasks | none |
| Week 14 | Ticket to Finale | Day 92 - 96: All the housemates need to participate in all of the tasks part of the ticket to finale. All the housemates receive points on how they play each task given. Eventually, the housemate with the most points at the end wins the ticket to the finale and enters the finale without getting evicted.: Housemate / Ticket To Finale Tasks & Points; Housemate / (task1) Balloon With Water Task / (task2) Block Above Head Task / (task3) Bigg Boss Tag Task / (task4) Song Identifying Task / (task5) Ball In Circular Path Task / (task6) Advising Task / (task7) Ball in Hoola Hoop Task / (task8) Nameplate Task / (task9) Holding on to Rope While Standing on Uneven Path Task / (points) Total Points; Aari / 5 / 4 / 4 / 4 / 2 / 1 / 4 / 1 / 2 / 27; Balaji / 7 / 2 / 7 / 1 / 6 / 2 / 5 / 2 / 1 / 33; Gabriella / 2 / 1 / 2 / 2 / 4 / 5 / 6 / 6 / 5 / 33; Rio / 6 / 6 / 1 / 6 / 7 / 3 / 3 / 5 / 3 / 40; Ramya / 3 / 7 / 5 / 5 / 3 / 4 / 1 / 3 / 6 / 37; Shivani / 1 / 5 / 6 / 7 / 1 / 6 / 2 / 4 / 7 / 39; Somshekar / 4 / 3 / 3 / 3 / 5 / 7 / 7 / 7 / 4 / 43; Somshekar received the most points and won the ticket to the finale and became the first finalist of the season. |
| Week 14 | In Jail | None |
| Week 14 | Captaincy Task | None |
| Week 14 | Captaincy Task Results | |
| Week 14 | Winner: None | |
| Week 14 | Defeat: None | |
| Week 14 | Defeat: None | |
| Week 14 | Safe from eviction | Day 97, 98: Aari, Balaji, Gabriella, Shivani and Ramya received enough public votes to stay in the competition and they were safe. |
| Week 14 | Eviction | Day 98: Shivani Narayanan was evicted from the house after facing the public vote. |
| Week 15 (Finale) | Entrances | * None |
| Week 15 (Finale) | House Captain | None |
| Week 15 (Finale) | Luxury Budget Tasks | N/A |
| Week 15 (Finale) | Reunion | Day 99 - 103: On day 99 Archana, Rekha, Nisha and Ramesh entered the house as special guest to reunite with the finalists.; On day 100 Sanam, Velmurugan, Aajeedh, Suchitra and Samyuktha entered the house as special guest to reunite with the finalists.; On day 101 Anitha entered the house as special guest to reunite with the finalists.; On day 103 Shivani and Suresh entered the house as special guest to reunite with the finalists.; On day 103 all the evicted housemates duration as guest ended and were sent home. |
| Week 15 (Finale) | Walked | Day 102: Gabriella Charlton Walked with 5 Lakh. |
| Week 15 (Finale) | Finalists | During the final week the public vote for who they want to win Bigg Boss. The finalists for the title were as following: Aari Arjunan; Balaji Murugadoss; Ramya Pandian; Rio Raj; Somshekar |
| Week 15 (Finale) | 4th runner-up | Day 105: Somshekar |
| Week 15 (Finale) | 3rd runner-up | Day 105: Ramya Pandian |
| Week 15 (Finale) | 2nd runner-up | Day 105: Rio Raj |
| Week 15 (Finale) | 1st runner-up | Day 105: Balaji Murugadoss |
| Week 15 (Finale) | Winner | Day 105: Aari Arjunan |

== Nomination table ==
| Weekly summary | Week 1 | | Week 2 | Week 3 | Week 4 | Week 5 | Week 6 | Week 7 | Week 8 | | Week 9 | Week 10 | | Week 11 | Week 12 | Week 13 | Week 14 | | Week 15 | | | |
| Weekly summary | Week 1 | | Week 2 | Week 3 | Week 4 | Week 5 | Week 6 | Week 7 | Week 8 | | Week 9 | Week 10 | | Week 11 | Week 12 | Week 13 | Day 92 | Day 96 | Day 102 | Day 105 Finale | | |
|---|---|---|---|---|---|---|---|---|---|---|---|---|---|---|---|---|---|---|---|---|---|---|
| Nominees for House Captaincy | All; Housemates | | Rekha; Shivani; Suresh | Gabriella; Rio; Velmurugan | Archana; Balaji; Sanam | Balaji; Samyuktha; Somshekar | Aari Arjunan; Nisha; Somshekar | Aajeedh; Gabriella; Nisha | Aari; Archana; Gabriella; Rio; Samyuktha; Somshekar | | Balaji; Ramesh; Ramya | All; Housemates | | Balaji; Nisha; Ramya | Archana; Balaji; Ramya | Aari; Rio; Somshekar | Aajeedh; Rio; Somshekar | | No; Nominees | | | |
| House Captain | Ramya | | Suresh | Rio | Archana | Samyuktha | Aari | Aajeedh | Rio | | Ramesh | Anitha | | Ramya | Archana | Aari | Rio | | No; Captain | | | |
| House Captain | Ramya | | Suresh | Rio | Archana | Samyuktha | Aari | Aajeedh | Rio | | Ramesh | Anitha | | Ramya | Balaji | Aari | Rio | | No; Captain | | | |
| Captain's Nominations | No; Nominations | | Aajeedh; Sanam | Suresh; Ramya | Aajeedh; Balaji | Aari; Rio | Gabriella; Shivani | Aari; Suchitra | Aari; Balaji | Not; Nominated | Nisha; Ramya | No; Nominations | | Shivani; Rio | Gabriella; Somshekar | Shivani; Somshekar | Balaji; Aari | No; Nominations | No; Nominations | | | |
| Vote for: | None | Task | Evict | | None | Evict | | | | Replace | Evict | Task | Swap | Evict | | | | Ticket To Finale | Cash prize Eviction | WIN | | |
| Aari | No; Nominations | Safe | Rekha; Sanam | Aajeedh; Suresh | Ramesh; Somshekar | Archana; Somshekar | House; Captain | Balaji; Rio | Nisha; Somshekar | Lost immunity power | Aajeedh; Shivani | Nominated | Swapped (Ramesh) | Aajeedh; Rio | Gabriella; Shivani | House Captain | Rio; Balaji | Lost ticket to finale | Rejected Eviction | Finalist | Winner (Day 105) | |
| Aari | No; Nominations | Safe | Rekha; Sanam | Aajeedh; Suresh | Ramesh; Somshekar | Archana; Somshekar | House; Captain | Balaji; Rio | Nisha; Somshekar | Lost immunity power | Aajeedh; Shivani | Nominated | Swapped (Ramesh) | Aajeedh; Rio | Gabriella; Shivani | House Captain | Rio; Balaji | Nominated | Rejected Eviction | Finalist | Winner (Day 105) | |
| Balaji | No; Nominations | Safe | Samyuktha; Sanam | Aari; Nisha | Rio; Somshekar | Aari; Sanam | Sanam; Somshekar | Aari; Somshekar | Aari; Nisha | Lost immunity power | Aari; Nisha | Nominated | Swapped (Gabriella) | Rio; Archana | House Captain | Somshekar; Gabriella | Aari; Ramya | Lost ticket to finale | Rejected Eviction | Finalist | 1st runner-up (Day 105) | |
| Balaji | No; Nominations | Safe | Samyuktha; Sanam | Aari; Nisha | Rio; Somshekar | Aari; Sanam | Sanam; Somshekar | Aari; Somshekar | Aari; Nisha | Lost immunity power | Aari; Nisha | Nominated | Swapped (Gabriella) | Rio; Archana | House Captain | Somshekar; Gabriella | Aari; Ramya | Nominated | Rejected Eviction | Finalist | 1st runner-up (Day 105) | |
| Rio | No; Nominations | Safe | Sanam; Shivani | House; Captain | Balaji; Ramya | Aari; Anitha | Anitha; Suchitra | Anitha; Suchitra | House; Captain | Not; Nominated | Anitha; Ramya | Safe | Not eligible | Aari; Balaji | Aari; Anitha | Ramya; Shivani | House; Captain | Lost ticket to finale | Rejected Eviction | Finalist | 2nd runner-up (Day 105) | |
| Rio | No; Nominations | Safe | Sanam; Shivani | House; Captain | Balaji; Ramya | Aari; Anitha | Anitha; Suchitra | Anitha; Suchitra | House; Captain | Not; Nominated | Anitha; Ramya | Safe | Not eligible | Aari; Balaji | Aari; Anitha | Ramya; Shivani | House; Captain | Nominated | Rejected Eviction | Finalist | 2nd runner-up (Day 105) | |
| Ramya | House; Captain | Shortlisted | Rekha; Sanam | Aari; Suresh | Sanam; Velmurugan | Balaji; Sanam | Anitha; Suchitra | Anitha; Suchitra | Anitha; Nisha | Not; Nominated | Aajeedh; Aari | Nominated | Not eligible | House Captain | Aari; Gabriella | Aajeedh; Gabriella | Shivani; Gabriella | Lost ticket to finale | Rejected Eviction | Finalist | 3rd runner-up (Day 105) | |
| Ramya | House; Captain | Shortlisted | Rekha; Sanam | Aari; Suresh | Sanam; Velmurugan | Balaji; Sanam | Anitha; Suchitra | Anitha; Suchitra | Anitha; Nisha | Not; Nominated | Aajeedh; Aari | Nominated | Not eligible | House Captain | Aari; Gabriella | Aajeedh; Gabriella | Shivani; Gabriella | Nominated | Rejected Eviction | Finalist | 3rd runner-up (Day 105) | |
| Somshekar | No Nominations | Safe | Rekha; Shivani | Aari; Suresh | Balaji; Suresh | Aari; Balaji | Balaji; Suchitra | Balaji; Suchitra | Sanam; Balaji | Lost immunity power | Balaji; Sanam | Safe | Swapped by Archana | Anitha; Shivani | Aajeedh; Shivani | Aajeedh; Shivani | Balaji; Aari | Won ticket to finale | Rejected Eviction | Finalist | 4th runner-up (Day 105) | |
| Somshekar | No Nominations | Safe | Rekha; Shivani | Aari; Suresh | Balaji; Suresh | Aari; Balaji | Balaji; Suchitra | Balaji; Suchitra | Sanam; Balaji | Lost immunity power | Balaji; Sanam | Safe | Swapped by Archana | Anitha; Shivani | Aajeedh; Shivani | Aajeedh; Shivani | Balaji; Aari | Finalist | Rejected Eviction | Finalist | 4th runner-up (Day 105) | |
| Gabriella | No Nominations | Shortlisted | Samyuktha; Sanam | Aari; Anitha | Aari; Anitha | Archana; Som | Samyuktha; Suchitra | Anitha; Samyuktha | Sanam; Nisha | Not; Nominated | Anitha; Shivani | Safe | Swapped by Balaji | Anitha; Shivani | Anitha; Shivani | Shivani; Aajeedh | Ramya; Balaji | Lost ticket to finale | Accepted Eviction | Evicted with ₹ 11 Lakh (Day 102) | | |
| Gabriella | No Nominations | Shortlisted | Samyuktha; Sanam | Aari; Anitha | Aari; Anitha | Archana; Som | Samyuktha; Suchitra | Anitha; Samyuktha | Sanam; Nisha | Not; Nominated | Anitha; Shivani | Safe | Swapped by Balaji | Anitha; Shivani | Anitha; Shivani | Shivani; Aajeedh | Ramya; Balaji | Nominated | Accepted Eviction | Evicted with ₹ 11 Lakh (Day 102) | | |
| Shivani | No Nominations | Shortlisted | Rekha; Sanam | Aari; Anitha | Sanam; Velmurugan | Aari; Sanam | Anitha; Sanam | Anitha; Suchitra | Anitha; Nisha | Not; Nominated | Aari; Somshekar | Nominated | Not eligible | Archana; Somshekar | Aari; Anitha | Gabriella; Aajeedh | Rio; Som | Lost TTF | Evicted (Day 98) | | | |
| Shivani | No Nominations | Shortlisted | Rekha; Sanam | Aari; Anitha | Sanam; Velmurugan | Aari; Sanam | Anitha; Sanam | Anitha; Suchitra | Anitha; Nisha | Not; Nominated | Aari; Somshekar | Nominated | Not eligible | Archana; Somshekar | Aari; Anitha | Gabriella; Aajeedh | Rio; Som | Nominated | Evicted (Day 98) | | | |
| Aajeedh | No Nominations | Shortlisted | Sanam; Shivani | Anitha; Aari | Ramesh; Sanam | Aari; Sanam | Anitha; Sanam | House; Captain | Archana; Nisha | Not Nominated | Aari; Shivani | Safe | Not eligible | Shivani; Archana | Aari; Anitha | Ramya; Somshekar | Evicted (Day 91) | | | | | |
| Anitha | No Nominations | Safe | Samyuktha; Shivani | Aajeedh; Suresh | Gabriella; Samyuktha | Archana; Gabriella | Samyuktha; Sanam | Ramesh; Samyuktha | Samyuktha; Ramesh | Toppled To; Samyuktha | Aajeedh; Shivani | Nominated | House; Captain | Aajeedh; Somshekar | Aajeedh; Shivani | Evicted (Day 84) | | | | | | |
| Archana | Not In House | | Entered (Day 10) | Aari; Aajeedh | House; Captain | Aari; Anitha | Sanam; Suchitra | Anitha; Suchitra | Balaji; Aari | Not; Nominated | Sanam; Shivani | Nominated | Swapped (Somshekar) | Aari; Anitha | Evicted (Day 77) | | | | | | | |
| Nisha | No; Nominations | Safe | Aajeedh; Sanam | Aajeedh; Suresh | Balaji; Suresh | Balaji; Suresh | Sanam; Suchitra | Anitha; Suchitra | Anitha; Sanam | Lost immunity power | Ramya; Shivani | Nominated | Not eligible | Evicted (Day 70) | | | | | | | | |
| Ramesh | No; Nominations | Safe | Sanam; Shivani | Somshekar; Suresh | Ramya; Sanam | Aari; Anitha | Anitha; Suchitra | Anitha; Suchitra | Sanam; Anitha | Lost immunity power | House; Captain | Safe | Swapped by Aari | Evicted (Day 69) | | | | | | | | |
| Sanam | No; Nominations | Shortlisted | Samyuktha; Gabriella | Balaji; Suresh | Nisha; Ramya | Balaji; Shivani | Balaji; Samyuktha | Balaji; Somshekar | Ramesh; Somshekar | Lost immunity power | Aajeedh; Gabriella | Evicted (Day 63) | | | | | | | | | | |
| Samyuktha | No; Nominations | Shortlisted | Sanam; Shivani | Aari; Anitha | Anitha; Rio | House; Captain | Anitha; Sanam | Anitha; Suchitra | Anitha; Sanam | Toppled By Anitha | Evicted (Day 56) | | | | | | | | | | | |
| Suchitra | Not In House | | | | Entered (Day 28) | Archana; Suresh | Archana; Gabriella | Archana; Sanam | Evicted (Day 49) | | | | | | | | | | | | | |
| Suresh | No; Nominations | Shortlisted | House; Captain | Aari; Ramesh | Nisha; Ramesh | Anitha; Somshekar | Evicted (Day 35) | | | | | | | | | | | | | | | |
| Velmurugan | No; Nominations | Safe | Gabriella; Ramya | Balaji; Suresh | Balaji; Aajeedh | Evicted (Day 28) | | | | | | | | | | | | | | | | |
| Rekha | No; Nominations | Shortlisted | Ramya; Samyuktha | Evicted (Day 14) | | | | | | | | | | | | | | | | | | |
| Notes | 1 | 2, 3, 4 | | 5, 6, 7 | None | 8, 9 | 10 | None | 11 | | None | 12, 13, 14 | | 15,16 | None | | 17, 18 | | 21 | 22, 23, 24, 25, 26, 27 | | |
| Against Public Vote | No; Nominations | Ramya; Gabriella; Shivani; Aajeedh; Sanam; Samyuktha; Rekha | | Aari; Balaji; Aajeedh; Anitha; Suresh | Balaji; Rio; Ramya; Somshekar; Aajeedh; Anitha; Nisha; Ramesh; Sanam; Suresh; Velmurugan | Aari; Balaji; Somshekar; Anitha; Archana; Sanam; Suresh | Balaji; Gabriella; Anitha; Sanam; Samyuktha; Suchitra | Aari; Balaji; Rio; Somshekar; Anitha; Samyuktha; Suchitra | Aari; Balaji; Somshekar; Anitha; Nisha; Ramesh; Sanam; Samyuktha | | Aari; Ramya; Shivani; Aajeedh; Anitha; Nisha; Sanam | Ramya; Somshekar; Gabriella; Shivani; Nisha; Ramesh | | Aari; Rio; Somshekar; Shivani; Aajeedh; Anitha; Archana | Aari; Gabriella; Shivani; Aajeedh; Anitha | Ramya; Somshekar; Gabriella; Shivani; Aajeedh | Aari; Balaji; Rio; Ramya; ~~Somshekar~~; Gabriella; Shivani | | Aari; Balaji; Rio; Ramya; Somshekar; Gabriella | Aari; Balaji; Rio; Ramya; Somshekar | | |
| Walked | None | | | | | | | | | | | | | | | | | | | | | |
| Eviction Free Pass | None | | | Aajeedh | None | | | | | | | | | | | | | | | | | |
| Sent to BB Prison | None | | Ramesh; Shivani | Aari; Aajeedh | Aari; Anitha | None | | Bala; Suchitra | Aari; Rio | | None | Ramesh; Anitha; Nisha | | Gabriella; Shivani | Aajeedh; Gabriella | Aari; Balaji | None | | | | | |
| Evicted | No; Eviction | | Rekha | Eviction; Cancelled | Velmurugan | Suresh | No; Eviction | Suchitra | Samyuktha | | Sanam | Ramesh | | Archana | Anitha | Aajeedh | Shivani | | Gabriella | Somshekar | Ramya | |
| Evicted | No; Eviction | | Rekha | Eviction; Cancelled | Velmurugan | Suresh | No; Eviction | Suchitra | Samyuktha | | Sanam | Nisha | | Archana | Anitha | Aajeedh | Shivani | | Gabriella | Rio | Balaji | Aari |

=== Notes ===
indicates that the housemate was directly nominated for eviction.
indicates the House Captain.
indicates the nominees for the House Captaincy.
indicates the former House Captain. (Former meaning that the House Captain would have been stripped of the captaincy, or else evicted/ejected/walked out after being nominated as the Captain)
indicates that the housemate was saved from nominations (Immune)
indicates that an evicted contestant was sent to Secret room and re-entered the Bigg Boss House after few days.
indicates that contestant left the Bigg Boss house on his own.
indicates the contestant has been ejected.
indicates the Eviction free pass has been used on a housemate.
indicates the winner.
indicates the first runner-up.
indicates the second runner-up.
indicates the third runner-up.
indicates the fourth runner-up.
indicates the contestant has been evicted.
indicates the housemate evicted themselve after accepting a cash prize eviction .
indicates a new wildcard contestant.
indicates the contestant is nominated.

- ^Note 1: During a task that was conducted in Week 1. Team 1: Aajeedh, Anitha, Balaji, Ramesh, Ramya, Shivani, Somshekar and Suresh, whilst Team 2: Aari, Gabriella, Nisha, Rio, Samyuktha, Sanam, Velmurugan and Rekha. Each team had to shortlist four housemates from each team for the Week 2 eviction process.
- ^Note 2: During this task, Aari, Anitha, Balaji, Nisha, Ramesh, Rio, Som, and Velmurugan were granted immunity for the following week's nomination process, whilst, Aajeedh, Gabriella, Ramya, Samyuktha, Sanam, Shivani, and Suresh were shortlisted for the following week's nomination process.
- ^Note 3: Aajeedh, Ramya, Gabriella, Samyuktha, Shivani, Sanam, Suresh and Rekha were nominated in Week 2 eviction, however Bigg Boss gave one of the nominated housemates to win the eviction free pass which allows the housemate to save themselves if they ever got evicted. However Aajeedh won the task and received the Eviction Free Pass.
- ^Note 4: Suresh was initially shortlisted for the Week 2 eviction process. However, he received immunity from the eviction after he became the House Captain in Week 2.
- ^Note 5: During a task conducted in Week 2, Sanam and Velmurugan were granted immunity for the following week's nomination process.
- ^Note 6: Archana entered the Bigg Boss House as a wildcard contestant and was exempted from the Week 3 nomination process.
- ^Note 7: Aajeedh was to be evicted on Week 3. However, he used his Eviction Free-Pass to save himself from eviction, without bestowing it on another nominated housemate. As a result, the eviction process was cancelled.
- ^Note 8: there was 5 evictions on day 28 4 evictions and one mid week eviction on day 28 because there was more people in this house so they have 5 evictions on day 28.
- ^Note 9: Suchitra entered the Bigg Boss House as a wildcard contestant and was exempted from the Week 5 nomination process.
- ^Note 10: The nomination and eviction process for Week 6 was scrapped due to the celebration of Diwali.
- ^Note 11: Anitha has won Nominate Topple Task and escaped from the Week 8 nomination process by directly nominating Samyuktha.
- ^Note 12: During the Luxury Budget Task conducted in Week 8, Aari, Anitha, Archana, Balaji, Nisha, Ramya, Shivani and Sanam, who failed their tasks, were directly nominated for the Week 9 eviction process. However, as the housemates were evacuated from the Bigg Bose House due to the Nivar Cyclone, the Luxury Budget Task was temporarily paused, and the direct nomination was shifted to Week 10.
- ^Note 13: The Top 3 Contestants in the Luxury Budget #1 – #13 Place Arrangement Task: Aari, Balaji, and Archana, were given power to swap a housemate who is safe with them, such that they get nominated. Aari swapped himself with Ramesh, Balaji swapped himself with Gabriella, and Archana swapped herself with Som.
- ^Note 14: In Week 10, Bigg Boss announced double eviction. Ramesh was evicted on Saturday's episode and Nisha was evicted on Sunday's episode.
- ^Note 15: In Week 11, Bigg Boss announced that the nomination process won't be the regular nomination where the housemates announce their nominations in the confession room privately but rather having an open nomination where housemates need to select two housemates and nominate them in front of the other housemates.
- ^Note 16: In Week 11, Archana won captaincy and become the captain of Week 12. However Archana got evicted on Day 77 and was directly removed from Captaincy. However, she was given the option to select a captain between Balaji and Ramya, and she selected Balaji as the Week 12 House Captain.
- ^Note 17: Rio became the House Captain for the third time on Week 14, but housemates could still nominate him for the final eviction process.
- ^Note 18: In Week 14, Somshekar won ticket to finale and became the first finalist of the season.
- ^Note 19: In the end of Week 14, the remaining five housemates would be selected as finalists, and would be eligible to compete to win the show.
- ^Note 20: In Week 15 Aari, Balaji, Gabriella, Ramya, Rio and Somshekar competed for a spot in the final five.
- ^Note 21: In Week 15 Gabriella took 5 Lakh and left the Bigg Boss house on Day 102.
- ^Note 22: In Week 15 Aari, Balaji, Ramya, Rio and Somshekar officially became the final five finalists eligible to win.
- ^Note 23: On day 105, Somshekar became the 4th Runner-Up.
- ^Note 24: On day 105, Ramya became the 3rd Runner-Up.
- ^Note 25: On day 105, Rio became the 2nd Runner-Up.
- ^Note 26: On day 105, Balaji became the 1st Runner-Up.
- ^Note 27: On day 105, Aari became the Winner and was awarded ₹50 lakh and a trophy.
