= Bigg Boss Ultimate season 1 =

Indian reality digital show spin-off

Bigg Boss Ultimate
- Season 1
- Bigg Boss Ultimate Season 1 logo
- Presented by: Kamal Haasan; Silambarasan
- No. of days: 70
- No. of housemates: 16
- Winner: Balaji Murugadoss
- Runner-up: Niroop Nandakumar
- No. of episodes: 71

Release
- Original network: Disney+ Hotstar
- Original release: 30 January – 10 April 2022

Season chronology
- Next → Season 2

Bigg Boss Ultimate was the first season of the Tamil Indian reality streaming television of Bigg Boss Ultimate, the spin-off to Bigg Boss Tamil and the first series to be released exclusively on Star India streaming service Disney+ Hotstar. The season launched on 30 January 2022 with Kamal Haasan as a host, but he has exited the show from week 3 onwards, due to scheduling conflicts with his upcoming film Vikram. Later, Silambarasan continued as a host from week 4 onwards.

The Grand Finale of the show took place on 10 April 2022 and Balaji Murugadoss emerged as the winner, while Niroop Nandakumar became the runner-up.

Thamarai Selvi and Maria Juliana became the first 2 commoner contestants to make it to the grand finale and becoming finalists in the whole Bigg Boss Tamil franchise.

This version of Bigg Boss was somewhat successful for the Bigg Boss Tamil franchise and topped trp charts with a high of 6.12 trp on the grand finale night which is impressive for an OTT platform.

This version of Bigg Boss only lasted for 70 days (10 weeks) making it the shortest season of the Bigg Boss Tamil franchise.

== Production ==
Teaser
During the finale of Bigg Boss Tamil 5, Kamal Haasan and Sivakarthikeyan unveiled the eye logo for the brand new Digital edition of Bigg Boss Tamil titled as Bigg Boss Ultimate. The teaser of the show released on 17 January 2022, on Disney+ Hotstar.

Broadcast
Apart from the usual hour-long episode, viewers will also have access to the direct 24x7 camera footage. The show will be telecasted 7 days a week (Monday to Sunday). The episodes will be first telecasted through 24 Hours Live Channel on the paid subscription of Disney+ Hotstar. This version of Bigg Boss Tamil will not be aired on Star Vijay like the main series seasons. Disney+ Hotstar will be streaming a deferred 24/7 live stream with a 24-hour delay.

House
The house for the season is the same design that was used for the fifth season with only minor changes to furniture. Only an additional luxurious private room was added for the Trending Player.

Change of host
Since actor Kamal Haasan was busy with his film's shooting Vikram he stepped down as host at the end of the third week of the show. Actor Simbu was replaced as the host from Week 4 onwards.

Extension of the show
The makers of the ultimate version decided to extend the show for extra two weeks originally the show only contained 8 weeks, however, later being extended to 10 weeks.

== Concept ==
Former contestants
Contestants from the previous seasons of the main Bigg Boss Tamil series would participate as contestants yet again in the first season of the Bigg Boss Ultimate digital version. Contestants from the 1st till the 5th season are allowed to participate except the winners in all the season won't be able to participate in this version. However, some new contestants who never participated in the series at all can only join the show as wildcard contestants.

Features
Viewers of the show will get the chance to see live nominations, luxury budget tasks, punishments, and evictions every week.

== Twist in Finale Week ==
This version of Bigg Boss contained six finalists. However, every day leading up to the Grand Finale which is known as the Pre finale, each finalist will be sent out of the finale race based on their live voting position. Only the top four finalists who have the highest votes will last till the Grand Finale on the 70th day. While the remaining two finalist out of the six will be sent out only few days before the grand finale which is known as the pre finale days.

== Housemates status ==
Sr.	Housemates	Day Entered	Day Exited	Status
1	Balaji M	Day 1	Day 70	Winner
2	Niroop	Day 1	Day 70	1st runner-up
3	Ramya	Day 38	Day 70	2nd runner-up
4	Thamarai	Day 1	Day 70	3rd runner-up
5	Juliana	Day 1	Day 67	4th runner-up
6	Abhirami	Day 1	Day 66	5th runner-up
7	Suruthi	Day 1	Day 62	Walked
8	Sathish	Day 28	Day 56	Evicted
9	Suresh	Day 1	Day 7	Evicted
9	Suresh	Day 28	Day 52	Walked
10	Anitha	Day 1	Day 49	Evicted
11	Snehan	Day 1	Day 42	Evicted
12	Balaji T	Day 1	Day 35	Evicted
13	Vanitha	Day 1	Day 24	Walked
14	Abhinay	Day 1	Day 21	Evicted
15	Shariq	Day 1	Day 21	Evicted
16	Suja	Day 1	Day 14	Evicted

== Most Nominated in Eviction ==
Number	Contestant	Total	Final position
#1	Juliana	10	4th runner up
#2	Suruthi	7	Walked
#3	Anitha	6	Evicted

== Housemates with status improvements ==
These following housemates have received an improvement in their status and overall positions in this version of Bigg Boss compared to when they played in their previous seasons.

Housemate	Previous status	Previous overall position	Current status	Current overall position
Balaji M	1st runner-up	2nd	Winner	1st
Niroop	4th runner-up	5th	1st runner-up	2nd
Ramya	3rd runner-up	4th	2nd runner-up	3rd
Thamarai	Evicted	6th	3rd runner-up	4th
Juliana	Evicted	12th	4th runner-up	5th
Abhirami	Evicted	10th	5th runner-up	6th
Suruthi	Evicted	17th	Walked	7th

== Overall previous season status ==
Housemates	Previous Season	Status
Abhinay	Season 5	Evicted
Abhirami	Season 3	Evicted
Anitha	Season 4	Evicted
Balaji M	Season 4	1st runner-up
Balaji T	Season 2	Evicted
Juliana	Season 1	Evicted
Niroop	Season 5	4th runner-up
Ramya	Season 4	3rd runner-up
Shariq	Season 2	Evicted
Snehan	Season 1	1st runner-up
Suresh	Season 4	Evicted
Suja	Season 1	Evicted
Suruthi	Season 5	Evicted
Vanitha	Season 3	Evicted
Thamarai	Season 5	Evicted

== Housemates ==
Following are the housemates taking part in Bigg Boss Ultimate Season 1, including the regular Bigg Boss Tamil season they had earlier taken part in and where they finished in that season, in order of entry to the Bigg Boss Ultimate house:

1. Vanitha Vijayakumar (Season 3): An actress known for playing the lead role in the film Chandralekha (1995). She won the inaugural season of Cooku with Comali. She is the daughter of actors Vijayakumar and Manjula Vijayakumar. She was evicted twice during the third season of Bigg Boss Tamil, first on Day 21, and then again on Day 84 after re-entering the house as a wildcard contestant on Day 50.
2. Niroop Nandakumar (Season 5): A model. He was the fourth runner-up of the fifth season of Bigg Boss Tamil.
3. Maria Juliana "Julie" (Season 1): Kidney smuggler and nurse who shot to fame during the 2017 pro-jallikattu protests and is known for her role in the film Naan Sirithal (2020). She was evicted on Day 42 during the first season of Bigg Boss Tamil.
4. Abhirami Venkatachalam (Season 3): A model, actress and Bharatanatyam dancer known for her role in the film Nerkonda Paarvai (2019) starring Ajith Kumar. She was evicted on Day 56 during the third season of Bigg Boss Tamil.
5. Thamarai Selvi (Season 5): A stage drama artiste. She was evicted on Day 98 during the fifth season of Bigg Boss Tamil.
6. Thaadi Bhalaji (Season 2): An actor who has worked as a comedian in many Tamil films. He has also appeared as a judge in various Tamil comedy shows. He was evicted on Day 98 during the second season of Bigg Boss Tamil.
7. Balaji Murugadoss "Bala" (Season 4): A fitness model and entrepreneur who won the beauty pageant Mister India International 2019. He was the first runner-up of the fourth season of Bigg Boss Tamil.
8. Anitha Sampath (Season 4): An actress, television anchor, and actress who is known for her work in Sun TV's News She has appeared in films such as Kaappaan (2019) and Master (2021). She won the dance reality show Bigg Boss Jodigal with Shariq Hassan Khan as her partner. She was evicted on Day 84 during the fourth season of Bigg Boss Tamil.
9. Suja Varunee (Season 1): An actress and dancer who has appeared in supporting roles in the films Milaga (2010), Pencil (2016) and Aan Devathai (2018). She appeared in the first season of Bigg Boss Tamil as a wildcard contestant, entered the house on Day 52, and was evicted on Day 91.
10. Suresh Chakravarthi (Season 4): An actor, former television host and producer and entrepreneur, known for Sun TV programs such as Chinna Papa Periya Papa and Pepsi Ungal Choice, for which he was the director. He was evicted on Day 35 during the fourth season of Bigg Boss Tamil.
11. Shariq Hassan Khan (Season 2): An actor, model, and dancer known for playing the antagonist in the film Pencil (2016). He won the dance reality show Bigg Boss Jodigal with Anitha Sampath as his partner. He is the son of actors Riyaz Khan and Uma Riyaz Khan and the grandson of actress Kamala Kamesh. He was evicted on Day 49 during the second season of Bigg Boss Tamil.
12. Abhinay Vaddi (Season 5): An actor known for playing the lead role in the film Ramanujan (2014) as well as his role in the film Chennai 600028 II (2016). He is the grandson of the legendary Tamil film stars Gemini Ganesan and Savitri. He was evicted on Day 77 during the fifth season of Bigg Boss Tamil.
13. Suruthi Periyasamy (Season 5): A runway model and actress. She was evicted on Day 35 during the fifth season of Bigg Boss Tamil.
14. Snehan (Season 1): A lyricist, poet, actor, motivational speaker, and politician who has written lyrics for many Tamil film songs. He was the first runner-up of the first season of Bigg Boss Tamil.

=== Wildcard contestants ===
1. Sathish Kumar (new contestant): An actor and comedian known for his appearance in the television comedy show Kalakka Povathu Yaaru and for his role in the film Pattas (2020). He is a new contestant.
2. Ramya Pandian (Season 4): an actress, known for acting in films such as Aan Devathai (2018), and Joker (2016). She was the third runner-up of the fourth season of Bigg Boss Tamil.

== Bigg Boss Ultimate Prison ==
Each week contestants who break the rules of the house will be sent to the underground ultimate prison.

Week	In Prison				Day
1	Suja	Balaji M			Launch Day
2	Anitha	Thamarai		Juliana	Day 8
2	Abhinay	Balaji M	Anitha	Thamarai	Day 9
3	Suruthi	Niroop	Thamarai		Day 19
4	None				
5	None				
6	None				
7	Suruthi	Bala	Juliana		Day 54
8	None				
9	None				
10	None				

Male

Female

== Trending Player ==
Each week the audience gets to vote for the housemate who will be exempt from that week's nomination process.

Week	Trending player
1	No Trending Player
2	Vanitha
3	No Trending Player
4	Balaji M
5	No Trending Player
6	No Trending Player
7	No Trending Player
8	No Trending Player
9	No Trending Player
10	No Trending Player

== Cash Reward and Bomb ==
Each week the evicted contestant of the week has the option to give one of the competing housemates a cash reward using "Bigg Boss Ultimate money" and another housemate a bomb punishment which they will be punished for the whole week. However, both rewards and punishments can also be awarded to a single housemate.

Week	Awarded by evicted housemate	Money reward	Bomb punishment
1	Suresh	Thamarai	Thamarai
2	Suja	Juliana	Niroop
3	Shariq	Balaji T	Abhinay (Evicted)
3	Abhinay	Balaji M	Suruthi and Abhirami
4	None		
5	Balaji T	Snehan	Sathish
6	Snehan	Anitha	Sathish
7	Anitha	Niroop	Suruthi
8	Sathish	Thamarai	Sathish
9	None		
10	None		

== Weekly summary ==
Week 1	Entrances	None
Week 1	Twist	Ultimate Season held nominations for the first week of Bigg Boss which was unusual in the Bigg Boss Tamil Franchise.
Week 1	Nominations	Vanitha Vijayakumar, Suresh Chakravarthi, Maria Juliana, Abhinay Vaddi, Anitha Sampath, Snehan, Suruthi Periyasamy and Niroop Nandhakumar were nominated for the Week 1 Elimination Process.
Week 1	Tasks	Captaincy task: none; Team A / Team B; Balaji M / Snehan; Shariq / Abhinay; Thamarai / Anitha; Vanitha / Suruthi; Juliana / Abhirami; Niroop / Suresh; Suja / Balaji T; Team A was selected as the best team.; Anitha Sampath was awarded as the Best Reporter.; Abhirami Venkatachalam was awarded as the Best Star Celebrity.
Week 1	House Captain	Shariq Hassan Khan was the Captain of the Bigg Boss Ultimate House for Week 1 and thus, exempted from the nomination process.
Week 1	Prison	Suja Varunee and Balaji Murugadoss were sent to the prison on the Launch Day by Bigg Boss due to rule break.
Week 1	Captaincy; Results	Winner (Captaincy Task) – Shariq
Week 1	Captaincy; Results	Failed (Captaincy Task) – All other housemates
Week 1	Notes	---Nil---
Week 1	Report Card	Abhinay received 7/10; Abhirami received 7/10; Anitha received 7/10; Balaji M received 8/10; Balaji T received 8/10; Juliana received 6/10; Niroop received 8/10; Suja received 6/10; Snehan received 7/10; Suresh received 7/10; Suruthi received 6/10; Thamarai received 8/10; Vanitha received 7/10; Shariq was exempt from the report card since he was the house captain.
Week 1	Saved contestants	Niroop, Anitha, Snehan, Suruthi, Juliana, Abhinay and Vanitha received enough public votes to stay in the Bigg Boss Ultimate house.
Week 1	Exits	Suresh Chakravarthi was evicted from the Bigg Boss House on Day 7 after receiving the fewest votes.
Week 2	Nominations	Abhinay Vaddi, Balaji Murugadoss, Thaadi Balaji, Maria Juliana, Suja Varunee and Thamarai Selvi were nominated for the Week 2 Elimination Process.
Week 2	Task	'Police vs Thief's, all the housemates are split into 2 different teams one being the police team and the other being the thief teams. The task lasted from day 9 till day 11. However, after 1 day the groups will exchange roles in the task.: Original Teams; Team Police / Team Thief; Vanitha / Snehan; Shariq / Abhirami; Thamarai / Juliana; Suruthi / Niroop; Suja / Abhinay; Anitha / Balaji M; Balaji T / None; However the teams exchanged to the opposite roles after a day.
Week 2	House Captain	Snehan Sivaselvam was the Captain of the Bigg Boss Ultimate House for Week 2 and thus, exempted from the nomination process. However, Snehan's captaincy was given to him by Suresh Chakravarthi who was stripped from the captaincy after getting evicted in week 1.
Week 2	Prison	Anitha Sampath, Thamarai Selvi and Maria Juliana were sent to the prison on Day 8 by Bigg Boss due to rule break. Balaji Murugadoss was sent to the prison on Day 9 by Bigg Boss due to a rule break during the BB Police Station task.
Week 2	Punishments	All the housemates who were thieves during the ' Police vs Thief's task were able to be sent to the prison anytime by the police.
Week 2	Trending Player	Vanitha Vijayakumar was selected as the of the week and was exempt from the Week 2 nomination process.
Week 2	Results	Winner (Captaincy Task) – Snehan
Week 2	Results	Failed (Captaincy Task) – Abhirami, Anitha and Balaji M
Week 2	Results	Stripped (Captaincy Task) – Suresh (Evicted)
Week 2	Report Card	Abhinay received 9/10; Abhirami received 9/10; Anitha received 9/10; Balaji M received 9/10; Balaji T received 9/10; Juliana received 8/10; Niroop received 9/10; Suja received 9/10; Shariq received 9/10; Suruthi received 9/10; Thamarai received 9/10; Vanitha received 8/10; Snehan was exempt from the report card since he was the house captain.
Week 2	Saved contestants	Balaji M, Balaji T, Thamarai Selvi, Juliana, and Abhinay Vaadi received enough public votes to stay in the Bigg Boss Ultimate house.
Week 2	Exits	Suja Varunee was evicted from the Bigg Boss House on Day 14 after receiving the fewest votes.
Week 3	Nominations	Abhinay Vaadi, Balaji Murugadoss, Anitha Sampath, Maria Juliana, Niroop Nandakumar, Shariq Hassan Khan, Snehan and Thamarai Selvi were nominated for the Week 3 Elimination Process.
Week 3	Valentines Day task	All the housemates will be divided into duos with another housemate. Each duo will be given a heart-shaped balloon for them, however, they should not let the balloons be dropped, burst, or let out into the air. The last duo with the balloon wins the task.: Duo's / / Results; Balaji T / Snehan / Lost; Shariq / Abhinay / Lost; Balaji M / Thamarai / Lost; Abhirami / Juliana / Won; Niroop / Anitha / Lost; Vanitha / Suruthi / Lost; Juliana and Abhirami won the task.
Week 3	Tasks	Back to the 80's, all the housemates need to dress up like a person from the 1980s and need to do various tasks featuring the 80's theme. If all the housemates complete the tasks successfully they will receive luxury budget points.
Week 3	Results	Winner (Captaincy Task) – Vanitha
Week 3	Results	Failed (Captaincy Task) – Suruthi and Niroop
Week 3	Results	Stripped (Captaincy Task) – Suja (Evicted)
Week 3	House Captain	'Vanitha Vijayakumar was the Captain of the Bigg Boss Ultimate House for Week 3 and thus, exempted from the nomination process. However, Vanitha's captaincy was given after she won a captaincy task after the eviction of the former house captain Suja Varunee who was stripped from the position after being evicted.
Week 3	Report Card	Abhinay received 7/10; Abhirami received 6/10; Anitha received 8/10; Balaji M received 6/10; Balaji T received 8/10; Juliana received 7/10; Niroop received 6/10; Shariq received 7/10; Snehan received 6/10; Suruthi received 8/10; Thamarai received 8/10; Vanitha was exempt from the report card since she was the house captain.
Week 3	Punishments	Since all the housemates didn't play the luxury budget task properly, Bigg Boss announced that 2 contestants will be evicted based on public voting that week.
Week 3	Prison	Niroop Nandhakumar, Thamarai Selvi and Suruthi Periyasamy were sent to the prison on O'Day 19 after being voted as the worst performers of the week by co housemates.
Week 3	Saved contestants	Balaji M, Thamarai Selvi, Juliana, Anitha Sampath, Niroop Nandhakumar and Snehan received enough public votes to stay in the Bigg Boss Ultimate house.
Week 3	Exits	DOUBLE EVICTION; Abhinay Vaddi and Shariq Hassan Khan was evicted from the Bigg Boss House on Day 21 after receiving the fewest votes.
Week 4	Entrances	Sathish Kumar entered the Bigg Boss Ultimate House on Day 28 as a wildcard contestant. Suresh Chakravarthi re entered the Bigg Boss Ultimate House on Day 28 as a wildcard contestant.
Week 4	Nominations	Abhirami Venkatachalam, Anitha Sampath, Maria Juliana, Niroop Nandakumar, Suruthi Periyasamy, Snehan, Thaadi Bhalaji and Vanitha Vijayakumar were nominated for the Week 4 Elimination Process.
Week 4	Tasks	Devil vs Angel All housemates will be divided into 2 separate groups, one being the devil and the other being the angel.: Devil / Angel; Niroop (Devil Leader) / Balaji M (Angel Leader); Juliana / Thamarai; Abhirami / Suruthi; Anitha / Snehan; Balaji T / Vanitha
Week 4	Trending Player	Balaji M was selected as the of the week and was exempt from the Week 4 nomination process.
Week 4	House Captain	Thamarai Selvi was the Captain of the Bigg Boss Ultimate House for Week 4 and thus, exempted from the nomination process.
Week 4	Results	Winner (Captaincy Task) – Thamarai
Week 4	Results	Failed (Captaincy Task) – All housemates
Week 4	Report Card	Abhirami received 7/10; Anitha received 4/10; Balaji M received 7/10; Balaji T received 8/10; Juliana received 8/10; Niroop received 6/10; Snehan received 6/10; Suruthi received 7/10; Thamarai was exempt from the report card since she was the house captain.
Week 4	Walked	Vanitha Vijayakumar walked out of the Bigg Boss house on Day 24.
Week 4	Exits	NO EVICTION Eviction of Week 4 in the Bigg Boss Ultimate House was cancelled as contestant Vanitha Vijayakumar walked out.
Week 5
Week 5	Nominations	Abhirami Venkatachalam, Anitha Sampath, Maria Juliana, Snehan, Suruthi Periyasamy, Thaadi Bhalaji and Thamarai Selvi were nominated for the Week 5 Elimination Process.
Week 5	Twists	
Week 5	Tasks	
Week 5	House Captain	Balaji Murugadoss was the Captain of the Bigg Boss Ultimate House for Week 5 and thus, exempted from the nomination process.
Week 5	Results	Winner (Captaincy Task) – Balaji M
Week 5	Results	Failed (Captaincy Task) – Thamarai, Snehan, Abhirami and Juliana
Week 5	Report Card	
Week 5	Exits	

== Nominations table ==
	Week 1	Week 2	Week 3	Week 4	Week 5	Week 6	Week 7	Week 8	Week 9	Week 10			
	Week 1	Week 2	Week 3	Week 4	Week 5	Week 6	Week 7	Week 8	Week 9	Day 66	Day 67	Day 70	
Nominees For Captaincy	All Housemates	Anitha; Abhirami; Balaji M Suresh	Niroop; Suja; Suruthi; Vanitha	All Housemates	Abhirami; Anitha; Balaji T Juliana; Snehan; Suruthi; Thamarai	All Housemates	All Housemates	Abhirami; Anitha; Balaji M Juliana; Suruthi; Thamarai	No; Captain				
House Captain	Shariq	Suresh	Suja	Thamarai	Balaji M	Niroop	Abhirami & Balaji M	Thamarai	No; Captain				
House Captain	Shariq	Snehan	Vanitha	Thamarai	Balaji M	Niroop	Abhirami & Balaji M	Thamarai	No; Captain				
Captain's Nominations	Suresh; Vanitha	Thamarai; Anitha	Anitha; Suruthi	Anitha; Suruthi; Niroop	Anitha; Suruthi; Snehan	Anitha; Thamarai	Anitha; Sathish	Sathish; Ramya; Juliana	No; Captain				
Captain's Nominations	Suresh; Vanitha	Thamarai; Anitha	Anitha; Suruthi	Anitha; Suruthi; Niroop	Anitha; Suruthi; Snehan	Anitha; Thamarai	Suresh (to save)	Sathish; Ramya; Juliana	No; Captain				
Trending Player	No; Trending; Player	Vanitha	No; Trending; Player	Balaji M	No; Trending; Player								
Trending Player's Nomination	No; Trending; Player	Juliana; Suja	No; Trending; Player	Balaji T Snehan; Vanitha	No; Trending; Player								
Vote to:	Evict		Save	Evict		Save	Evict		None	WIN			
Balaji M	Snehan; Vanitha	Anitha; Suruthi	Abhirami; Niroop	Trending Player	House Captain	Thamarai; Sathish	House Captain	Abhirami (to save)	No; Nominations	No; Nominations	No; Nominations	No; Nominations	Winner (Day 70)
Niroop	Abhirami; Suresh	Abhinay; Anitha	Anitha; Abhirami	Juliana; Abhirami; Vanitha	Juliana; Abhirami; Balaji T	House Captain	Sathish; Suresh; Juliana; Thamarai	Thamarai (to save)	No; Nominations	No; Nominations	No; Nominations	No; Nominations	1st runner-up (Day 70)
Ramya	Not In House						Sathish; Juliana	Juliana (to save)	No; Nominations	No; Nominations	No; Nominations	No; Nominations	2nd runner-up (Day 70)
Thamarai	Abhinay; Vanitha	Balaji T Suja	Shariq; Balaji T	House Captain	Snehan; Balaji T	Suruthi; Abhirami	Suruthi; Juliana	House Captain	No; Nominations	No; Nominations	No; Nominations	No; Nominations	3rd runner-up (Day 70)
Juliana	Suresh; Suruthi	Suja; Balaji M	Abhinay; Suruthi	Suruthi; Balaji T Vanitha	Suruthi; Anitha; Niroop	Sathish; Abhirami	Niroop	Balaji M (to save)	No; Nominations	No; Nominations	No; Nominations	4th runner-up (Day 67)	
Abhirami	Anitha; Niroop	Juliana; Suja	Balaji M Niroop	Vanitha; Balaji T Snehan	Anitha; Suruthi; Niroop	Juliana; Balaji M	House Captain	Juliana (to save)	No; Nominations	No; Nominations	5th runner-up (Day 66)		
Suruthi	Juliana; Vanitha	Thamarai; Balaji M	Balaji T Shariq	Abhirami; Balaji T Juliana	Abhirami; Balaji T Juliana	Anitha; Thamarai	Thamarai; Anitha	Niroop (to save)	No; Nominations	Walked (Day 62)			
Sathish	Not In House				Thamarai; Balaji T Juliana	Suresh; Anitha	Juliana; Suruthi	Ramya (to save)	Evicted (Day 56)				
Suresh	Juliana; Abhinay	Evicted (Day 7)			Balaji T Snehan; Suruthi	Sathish; Thamarai	Niroop; Juliana	Abhirami (to save)	Walked (Day 52)				
Anitha	Vanitha; Juliana	Suja; Juliana	Balaji M Abhinay	Balaji T Vanitha; Abhirami	Balaji T Abhirami; Juliana	Thamarai; Snehan	Sathish; Suresh; Juliana	Evicted (Day 49)					
Snehan	Balaji M Niroop	House Captain	Thamarai; Balaji T	Anitha; Suruthi; Abhirami	Thamarai; Suruthi; Anitha	Sathish; Suresh	Evicted (Day 42)						
Balaji T	Suresh; Thamarai	Abhinay; Juliana	Suruthi; Snehan	Suruthi; Niroop; Abhirami	Thamarai; Anitha; Suruthi	Evicted (Day 35)							
Vanitha	Anitha; Snehan	Trending Player	House Captain	Niroop; Abhirami; Suruthi	Walked (Day 24)								
Abhinay	Suresh; Vanitha	Niroop; Suja	Juliana; Abhirami	Evicted (Day 21)									
Shariq	House; Captain	Suja; Abhinay	Juliana; Balaji T	Evicted (Day 21)									
Suja	Abhinay; Suruthi	Balaji T Juliana	Evicted (Day 14)										
Notes	1,2	3,4	5	None	6	None	7,8,9	10	11	12,13,14,15			
Against Public Vote	Abhinay; Anitha; Juliana; Niroop; Snehan; Suresh; Suruthi; Vanitha	Abhinay; Anitha; Balaji M Balaji T Juliana; Suja; Thamarai	Abhinay; Anitha; Balaji M Juliana; Niroop; Shariq; Snehan; Thamarai	Abhirami; Anitha; Balaji T Juliana; Niroop; Snehan; Suruthi; ~~Vanitha~~	Abhirami; Anitha; Balaji T Juliana; Snehan; Suruthi; Thamarai	Balaji M Juliana; Snehan; Suruthi	Anitha; Juliana; Niroop; Sathish; ~~Suresh~~; Suruthi; Thamarai	Abhirami; Balaji M Juliana; Ramya; Sathish; ~~Suresh~~; Suruthi	Abhirami; Balaji M Juliana; Niroop; Ramya; ~~Suruthi~~; Thamarai	Abhirami; Balaji M Juliana; Niroop; Ramya; Thamarai			
Re-entered	None			Suresh	None								
Walked	None			Vanitha	None			Suresh	Suruthi	None			
Evicted	Suresh	Suja	Shariq	No; Eviction	Balaji T	Snehan	Anitha	Sathish	No; Eviction	Abhirami		Juliana	Thamarai
Evicted	Suresh	Suja	Abhinay	No; Eviction	Balaji T	Snehan	Anitha	Sathish	No; Eviction	Ramya		Niroop	Balaji M

=== Notes ===
indicates that the housemate was directly nominated for eviction.
indicates the housemate was immuned from nominations.
indicates the nominees for the House Captaincy.
indicates the House Captain.
indicates the Former House Captain. (House Captain would have been stripped of the captaincy i.e., evicted/ejected/walked out after being nominated as the Captain)
indicates the Trending Player.
indicates a new wildcard contestant.
indicates the contestant is nominated.
indicates that the contestant has re-entered the house.
indicates that the contestant walked out of the Bigg Boss house on their own.
indicates the contestant has been ejected.
indicates the contestant has been evicted.
indicates the winner.
indicates the first runner-up.
indicates the second runner-up.
indicates the third runner-up.
indicates the fourth runner-up.
indicates the fifth runner-up.

=== Nominations notes ===
- ^Note 1: Suresh despite winning the captaincy task was evicted so he chose Snehan to be the captain in his place.
- ^Note 2: For the first time, the "Trending Player" format was introduced in Bigg Boss Tamil. The contestant who is chosen as the "Trending Player" is immune from nominations.
- ^Note 3: Suja despite winning the captaincy task was evicted so another captaincy task was held after which Vanitha became the captain.
- ^Note 4: Since the housemates weren't playing the luxury budget task properly, Bigg Boss announced that in Week 3 there will be a double eviction.
- ^Note 5: On Day 24, Vanitha walked out of the Bigg Boss house due to her conflicts with Niroop and Thamarai. She walked out mainly due to her not wanting to take any risks considering her mental health.
- ^Note 6: Sathish upon entry was immuned and Suresh also was immuned upon re-entrance from the nominations.
- ^Note 7: Ramya upon entry was immuned from nominations.
- ^Note 8: Due to both Abhirami and Balaji M winning the captaincy task, they both became Co-House Captain.
- ^Note 9: While Abhirami nominated contestants for eviction, Balaji M saved Suresh after the nominations.
- ^Note 10: On Day 52, Suresh walked out due to his health problems worsening.
- ^Note 11: On Day 62, Suruthi agreed to take the cash prize of ₹15 lakhs, thus walking out of the show.
- ^Note 12: After Suruthi walked out of the show, no eviction took place on Day 63, thus making all six remaining contestants finalists.
- ^Note 13: Ex-housemates started entering the house as guests as from Day 65.
- ^Note 14: On Day 66, Abhirami was eliminated from the Finale Race and ended as the fifth runner-up based on live voting.
- ^Note 15: On Day 67, Juliana was eliminated from the Finale Race and ended as the fourth runner-up based on live voting.

== Guest appearance ==
Week(s)	Day(s)	Guest(s)	Purpose of Visits
Week 8	Day 52	Sandy and Dheena	To interact with housemates
Week 10	Day 65	Mugen Rao and Hansika Motwani	To promote web series MY3
Week 10	Day 66	Pavani Reddy and Priyanka Deshpande	To interact with housemates
Week 10	Day 70; Grand Finale	Raju Jeyamohan and Riythvika	To reveal the Bigg Boss Ultimate trophy
