= Danny (2020 film) =

Indian Tamil language action film

- Film poster
- Directed by: LC Santhanamoorthy
- Written by: Santhanamoorthy
- Produced by: P. G. Muthiah
- Starring: Varalaxmi Sarathkumar
- Cinematography: B Anandkumar
- Edited by: SN Fazil
- Music by: Santhosh Dhayanidhi; Sai Bhaskar
- Production company: PG Mediaworks
- Distributed by: Zee5
- Release date: 1 August 2020
- Running time: 95 minutes
- Country: India
- Language: Tamil

Danny is a 2020 Indian Tamil language action thriller film written and directed by Santhanamoorthy on his directorial debut. The film casts Varalaxmi Sarathkumar in the main lead as a cop along with a Dog. Principal photography of the film began in January 2019. The film had a direct-to-streaming release on ZEE5.

== Synopsis ==
Kunthavai, a police inspector, is assigned a tricky murder case. Upon investigation, she sets out to catch a gang of serial killers involved in the murder with the help of Danny, a police dog.

== Cast ==
- Varalaxmi Sarathkumar as Inspector Kunthavai
- Labrador Retriever as Danny
- Vela Ramamoorthy as Chidambaram
- Anitha Sampath as Madhi
- Kawin as Neelakandan
- Durai Sudhakar as Selvam
- Vinoth Kishan as Kavi The Main Antagonist & a Drug Addict
- Aathreyaa as Saravanan
- KPY Ramar as Veterinary Doctor
- Shanaaya Daphne as Dhanam
- Saravana Sakthi as Special appearance
- Rajapandi

== Production ==
The film was announced by first-time director LC Santhanamoorthy and the filming commenced during early January 2019. The film genre was revealed to be made as woman oriented action film casting Varalaxmi Sarathkumar as a police cop and making it the second consecutive time for the actress to play such a role after Maari 2. The first look poster was unveiled by actor Jayam Ravi on Varalaxmi's 34th birthday during 5 March 2019 and the filmmakers nicknamed the lead actress as Makkal Selvi on her birthday at the sets Danny.

== Soundtrack ==
Track listing
No.	Title	Lyrics	Music	Singer(s)	Length
1.	"Yaazhiye"	K Sathish Kumar	Sai Bhaskar	Arul Pragasam; Sai Bhaskar	2:14
2.	"Hey Danny"	K Sathish Kumar	Sai Bhaskar	Udhay Kannan; Sai Bhaskar	2:88
3.	"Yaarparthadhu"	Thanikodi	Santhosh Dhayanidhi	Uthira Unnikrishnan	3:11
Total length:					8:13

== Release ==
The film was released on ZEE5 on August 1, 2020.
