= Bigg Boss (Tamil TV series) season 3 =

Bigg Boss
- Season 3
- Bigg Boss season 3
- Presented by: Kamal Haasan
- No. of days: 105
- No. of housemates: 17
- Winner: Mugen Rao
- Runner-up: Sandy
- No. of episodes: 106

Release
- Original network: Star Vijay
- Original release: 23 June – 6 October 2019

Season chronology
- ← Previous; Season 2 Next → Season 4

Bigg Boss 3 is the third season of the Tamil-Indian reality show Bigg Boss, which premiered on Star Vijay on 23 June 2019 until 6 October 2019. Frooti was the sponsor for the third season. Kamal Haasan returned as host for the third time. The show was aired on Star Vijay. Hotstar also provided content aired on television and unseen clips. The house, located at EVP World in Chembarambakkam, Chennai, was completely renovated with a Chettinad-based theme for this season.

Mugen Rao, made history by becoming the first-ever International contestant to emerge as winner in the Bigg Boss India franchise. Bigg Boss Tamil season 3 is also the only version of the Indian franchise to feature two international contestants in the finale.(Malaysia & Sri Lanka)

Abhirami Venkatachalam and Vanitha Vijayakumar returned as contestants in Bigg Boss Ultimate season 1.

== Housemate status ==
Following were the housemates who took part in Bigg Boss Tamil season 3:

| SR | Housemate | Day entered | Day exited | Status |
|---|---|---|---|---|
| 1 | Mugen | Day 1 | Day 105 | Winner |
| 2 | Sandy | Day 1 | Day 105 | 1st Runner-up |
| 3 | Losliya | Day 1 | Day 105 | 2nd Runner-up |
| 4 | Sherin | Day 1 | Day 105 | 3rd Runner-up |
| 5 | Tharshan | Day 1 | Day 98 | Evicted |
| 6 | Kavin | Day 1 | Day 94 | Walked |
| 7 | Cheran | Day 1 | Day 77 | Secret Room |
| 7 | Cheran | Day 79 | Day 91 | Evicted |
| 8 | Vanitha | Day 1 | Day 21 | Evicted |
| 8 | Vanitha | Day 50 | Day 84 | Evicted |
| 9 | Kasthuri | Day 45 | Day 63 | Evicted |
| 10 | Abhirami | Day 1 | Day 56 | Evicted |
| 11 | Madhumitha | Day 1 | Day 54 | Ejected |
| 12 | Sakshi | Day 1 | Day 49 | Evicted |
| 13 | Saravanan | Day 1 | Day 44 | Ejected |
| 14 | Reshma | Day 1 | Day 42 | Evicted |
| 15 | Meera | Day 3 | Day 35 | Evicted |
| 16 | Mohan | Day 1 | Day 28 | Evicted |
| 17 | Fathima | Day 1 | Day 14 | Evicted |

== Housemates ==
The list of housemates in the order of entering the house:

=== Original contestants ===
1. Fathima Babu – Film actor and newsreader
2. Mohan Vaidya – Musician
3. Losliya Mariyanesan – Sri Lankan Tamil newsreader and film actor
4. Sakshi Agarwal – Film actress
5. Abhirami Venkatachalam – Actor and model
6. Jangiri Madhumitha – Comedienne
7. Saravanan – Film actor
8. Sherin Shringar – Film actress
9. Cheran – Film director
10. Kavin – Serial and film actor
11. Vanitha Vijayakumar – Film actress
12. Tharshan – Sri Lankan Tamil model and actor
13. Mugen Rao – Musician, Singer and actor
14. Sandy– Choreographer
15. Reshma Pasupuleti – Serial and film actor

=== Wildcard contestants ===
1. Meera Mithun – Model
2. Kasthuri Shankar – Film actress

== Guests appearance ==
| Week | Day | Guest(s) | Purpose of visit |
|---|---|---|---|
| 1 | 0 | Ganja Karuppu (Season 1 contestant) | To escort housemate Saravanan to the Bigg Boss house. |
| 1 | 0 | Harish Kalyan (Season 1 contestant) | To escort housemate Tharshan to the house. |
| 10 | 64 to 69 | Traditional and cultural dancers and stage actors | As a part of luxury budget task. |
| 11 | 72 to 76 | Abhirami Venkatachalam, Sakshi Agarwal and Mohan Vaidya | The trio of previously evicted Bigg Boss Tamil 3 contestants entered the house as guests for weekly activities such as award distribution and left the house on Day 76. |
| 12 | 79 to 81 | All the family members and friends of housemates | As a part of luxury budget task. |
| 14 | 93 | Yashika Anand and Mahat Raghavendra | Contestants of the second season of Bigg Boss, they entered the house to spend some time with the housemates and to promote their film, Ivan Oru Utthaman. |
| 14 | 94 | Riythvika and Janani Iyer | The winner and third runner–up of the second season of Bigg Boss, they entered the house to spend some time with the housemates and to promote their films, Irandaam Ulagaporin Kadaisi Kundu and Vezham. |
| 14 | 95 | Aishwarya Dutta | The runner–up of the second season of Bigg Boss, they entered the house to spend some time with the housemates. |
| 15 | 99 | Fathima Babu, Reshma Pasupuleti, Meera Mitun and Mohan Vaidya | The group of previously evicted Bigg Boss Tamil 3 contestants entered the house as guests for the last week activities. |
| 15 | 100 | Priyanka and Soundarya Bala Nandakumar from Super Singer | To entertain the contestants with songs. |
| 15 | 101 | Sakshi Agarwal, Abhirami Venkatachalam, Vanitha Vijayakumar, Cheran and Kasthuri Shankar | The group of previously evicted Bigg Boss Tamil 3 contestants entered the house as guests for the last week activities. |
| 15 | 102 | Ma Ka Pa Anand, Rio Raj, Priyanka Deshpande, Rakshan, Thaadi Balaji | To promote the show The Wall. |
| 15 | 103 | All evicted/walked contestants except Saravanan and Madhumitha | The group of previously evicted Bigg Boss Tamil 3 contestants entered the house as guests for the last week activities. |
| 15 | 105 | Kamal Haasan | To encourage the finalists on account of the Grand Finale. |
| 15 | 105 | Riythvika | To introduce the Bigg Boss trophy to the Housemates and to escort Sherin (Third Runner up). |
| 15 | 105 | Shruti Haasan | To escort Losliya (Second Runner up). |

== Nominations table ==
| | Week 1 | Week 2 | Week 3 | Week 4 | Week 5 | Week 6 | Week 7 | Week 8 | Week 9 | Week 10 | Week 11 | Week 12 | Week 13 | Week 14 | Week 15 (Grand finale week) | |
|---|---|---|---|---|---|---|---|---|---|---|---|---|---|---|---|---|
| House; Captain | Vanitha | Mohan | Abhirami | Sakshi | Reshma | Tharshan | Mugen | Sandy | Madhumitha | Cheran | Vanitha | Losliya | No; Captain | Mugen | No; Captain | |
| House; Captain | Vanitha | Mohan | Abhirami | Sakshi | Reshma | Tharshan | Mugen | Sandy | Sherin | Cheran | Vanitha | Losliya | No; Captain | Mugen | No; Captain | |
| Captain's; Nominations | No; Nominations | Cheran; Fathima | Meera; Madhumitha | Abhirami; Madhumitha | Kavin; Cheran | Madhumitha; Reshma | Tharshan; Saravanan | Abhirami; Madhumitha | Mugen; Kasthuri | Kavin; Mugen | Kavin; Losliya | Vanitha; Sherin | No; Nominations | No; Nominations | No; Nominations | |
| Vote for: | None | Evict | | | | | | | | None | Evict | | | | Finale Nominations / Win | |
| Mugen | No; Nominations | Cheran; Meera | Vanitha; Meera | Meera; Saravanan | Madhumitha; Saravanan | Reshma; Madhumitha | House; Captain | Cheran; Tharshan | Cheran; Kasthuri | Kavin; Losliya | Cheran; Losliya | Vanitha; Tharshan | Cheran; Losliya | House; Captain and finalist (ticket To finale winner) | Nominated | **Winner** (Day 105) |
| Sandy | No; Nominations | Madhumitha; Cheran | Vanitha; Meera | Meera; Cheran | Abhirami; Sakshi | Madhumitha; Abhirami | Sakshi; Abhirami | House; Captain | Cheran; Kasthuri | Sherin; Vanitha | Kavin; Losliya | Vanitha; Sherin | Cheran; Losliya | Nominated | | **1st Runner-up** (Day 105) |
| Losliya | No; Nominations | Meera; Saravanan | Mohan; Vanitha | Meera; Mohan | Sakshi; Meera | Madhumitha; Sakshi | Sakshi; Saravanan | Mugen; Sherin | Kasthuri; Cheran | Vanitha; Sherin | Mugen; Sherin | House; Captain | Mugen; Sherin | Nominated | | **2nd Runner-up** (Day 105) |
| Sherin | No; Nominations | Meera; Madhumitha | Madhumitha; Meera | Meera; Saravanan | Meera; Saravanan | Kavin; Losliya | Kavin; Losliya | Mugen; Kavin | House; Captain | Mugen; Kavin | Kavin; Losliya | Vanitha; Sandy | Kavin; Losliya | Nominated | | **3rd Runner-up** (Day 105) |
| Tharshan | No; Nominations | Meera; Sakshi | Vanitha; Meera | Meera; Saravanan | Saravanan; Kavin | House; Captain | Abhirami; Saravanan | Abhirami; Mugen | Kasthuri; Cheran | Vanitha; Kavin | Kavin; Losliya | Vanitha; Sandy | Cheran; Losliya | Nominated | Evicted (Day 98) | |
| Kavin | No; Nominations | Meera; Madhumitha | Vanitha; Meera | Meera; Cheran | Sakshi; Abhirami | Reshma; Madhumitha | Sakshi; Abhirami | Abhirami; Madhumitha | Cheran; Kasthuri | Vanitha; Sherin | Cheran; Sherin | Vanitha; Sherin | Cheran; Sherin | Accepted | Evicted with ₹5L (Day 94) | |
| Cheran | No; Nominations | Losliya; Tharshan | Vanitha; Meera | Meera; Saravanan | Kavin; Sakshi | Kavin; Reshma | Abhirami; Sakshi | Vanitha; Mugen | Sandy; Tharshan | House; Captain | Kavin; Mugen | In Secret; Room | Losliya; Kavin | Evicted (Day 91) | | |
| Vanitha | House; Captain | Meera; Cheran | Saravanan; Madhumitha | Evicted (Day 21) | | | | Entered (Day 50) | Sandy; Tharshan | Mugen; Kavin | House; Captain | Tharshan; Sherin | Evicted (Day 84) | | | |
| Kasthuri | Not In House | | | | | | Entered (Day 42) | Kavin; Losliya | Kavin; Sandy | Evicted (Day 63) | | | | | | |
| Abhirami | No; Nominations | Meera; Madhumitha | House; Captain | Meera; Saravanan | Kavin; Meera | Kavin; Madhumitha | Sandy; Saravanan | Kavin; Madhumitha | Evicted (Day 56) | | | | | | | |
| Madhumitha | No; Nominations | Kavin; Fathima | Sakshi; Sherin | Meera; Reshma | Kavin; Sakshi | Kavin; Sakshi | Abhirami; Sakshi | Kavin; Losilya | Walked (Day 54) | | | | | | | |
| Sakshi | No; Nominations | Meera; Madhumitha | Saravanan; Madhumitha | House; Captain | Meera; Saravanan | Saravanan; Kavin | Losliya; Abhirami | Evicted (Day 49) | | | | | | | | |
| Saravanan | No; Nominations | Cheran; Fathima | Mohan; Vanitha | Mohan; Abhirami | Abhirami; Cheran | Sakshi; Abhirami | Losliya; Abhirami | Ejected (Day 44) | | | | | | | | |
| Reshma | No; Nominations | Fathima; Madhumitha | Saravanan; Madhumitha | Meera; Saravanan | House; Captain | Cheran; Kavin | Evicted (Day 42) | | | | | | | | | |
| Meera | No; Nominations | Abhirami; Sakshi | Madhumitha; Losliya | Cheran; Tharshan | Sakshi; Abhirami | Evicted (Day 35) | | | | | | | | | | |
| Mohan | No; Nominations | House; Captain | Saravanan; Madhumitha | Meera; Saravanan | Evicted (Day 28) | | | | | | | | | | | |
| Fathima | No; Nominations | Kavin; Saravanan | Evicted (Day 14) | | | | | | | | | | | | | |
| Notes | 1 | 2 | none | | | | 3, 4 | 5, 6 | none | 7 | 8 | 9 | none | 10 | none | |
| Against public vote | None | Cheran; Fathima; Kavin; Madhumitha; Meera; Sakshi; Saravanan | Madhumitha; Meera; Mohan; Saravanan; Vanitha | Abhirami; Cheran; Meera; Mohan; Saravanan | Abhirami; Cheran; Kavin; Meera; Sakshi; Saravanan | Abhirami; Kavin; Madhumitha; Reshma; Sakshi | Abhirami; Losliya; Sakshi; ~~Saravanan~~ | Abhirami; Kavin; Losliya; ~~Madhumitha~~; Mugen | Cheran; Kasthuri; Sandy; Tharshan | Kavin; Mugen; Sherin; Vanitha | Cheran; Kavin; Losliya; Mugen; Sherin | Kavin; Vanitha; Sherin; Sandy; Tharshan | Cheran; Kavin; Losliya; Sherin | Kavin; Losliya; Sandy; Sherin; Tharshan | **Losliya**; **Mugen**; **Sandy**; **Sherin** | |
| Re-entered | none | | | | | | | **Vanitha** | none | | | | | | | |
| Ejected | none | | | | | | **Saravanan** | **Madhumitha** | none | | | | | | | |
| Evicted | No; Eviction | **Fathima** | **Vanitha** | **Mohan** | **Meera** | **Reshma** | **Sakshi** | **Abhirami** | **Kasthuri** | No; Eviction | **Cheran** | **Vanitha** | **Cheran** | **Kavin** **Tharshan** | **Sherin** | **Losliya** |
| Evicted | No; Eviction | **Fathima** | **Vanitha** | **Mohan** | **Meera** | **Reshma** | **Sakshi** | **Abhirami** | **Kasthuri** | No; Eviction | **Cheran** | **Vanitha** | **Cheran** | **Kavin** **Tharshan** | **Sandy** | **Mugen** |

=== Notes ===
indicates that the Housemate was directly nominated for eviction.
indicates the House Captain.
indicates the former House Captain. (former meaning that the House Captain would have been stripped of the captaincy, or else evicted/ejected/walked out after being nominated as the Captain)
indicates that the housemate was saved from nominations (Immune), or entered the Bigg Boss House after the weekly nomination (Exempt).
indicates that an evicted contestant was sent to Secret room and re-entered the Bigg Boss House after few days.
indicates that contestant was walked out of BiggBoss house on his own.
indicates that the housemate has re entered.
indicates the contestant has been ejected.
indicates the winner.
indicates the first runner up.
indicates the second runner up.
indicates the third runner up.
indicates the contestant has been evicted.
indicates the contestant is nominated.
indicates the housemate evicted themselve after accepting a cash prize eviction .
BOLD, If a housemates name is in bold during "against public vote" it means that they are a finalist.
