= Bigg Boss Ultimate =

Indian Tamil-language digital reality series

- Show's first season eye logo with host Silambarasan
- Presented by: Kamal Hassan (Week 1–3); Silambarasan (Week 4–10)
- Voices of: Sasho
- Country of origin: India
- Original language: Tamil
- No. of seasons: 1
- No. of episodes: 71

Production
- Production location: Chennai
- Camera setup: Multi-camera
- Running time: 60 minutes
- Production company: Banijay

Original release
- Network: Disney+ Hotstar
- Release: 30 January – 10 April 2022

Related
- Bigg Boss

Bigg Boss: Ultimate (or BB Ultimate for short) is a spin-off Indian Tamil-language reality streaming television series of the show Bigg Boss, that airs exclusively on Disney+ Hotstar. Hosted by Silambarasan.

The first season of the show premiered on 30 January 2022 with Kamal Hassan as host. However the host has exited the show from week 3 onwards, due to scheduling conflicts with his upcoming film Vikram, Silambarasan continued as a host from week 4 onwards.

== Concept ==
As with the televised series, the group of contestants—referred to as Housemates—are enclosed in the Bigg Boss House under constant surveillance of cameras and microphones. However, the contestants that participate in this edition are all the popular contestants who participated in the original edition Bigg Boss in various different seasons and brand new celebrity contestants as well. The winner of Bigg Boss Ultimate will receive ₹35 lakh and the "Ultimate edition" trophy.

What separated this from the main televised series was that the show is a 24/7 non-stop show unlike the 1 hour time for the original edition.

== Development ==
The spin-off edition was officially announced on 16 January 2022, by Star Vijay while the grand finale of the fifth season was still in progress. However, after the conclusion of the fifth season from the main edition, The makers announced that the Bigg Boss house will be the same from the fifth season however minor changes will be done to the designs of the house. The makers also announced that unlike the original series where each season lasts for 105 days and 15 weeks, the Ultimate edition will only contain 56 days and 8 weeks each season but Season 1 was extended to 70 Days.

=== Broadcasts ===
There was no television coverage for this edition; instead, it would be completely streamed online at Disney+ Hotstar for 24×7 coverage. However a daily 1.30 hour main coverage episodes telecast on Disney+ Hotstar everyday at 9:00 pm.

=== House ===
The location for the house is still set to remain at Chennai like how it did for the original series. However minor changes and renovation is done to the house for this edition. The house contains a living area, One large bedroom, kitchen, garden, bathroom, store room, smoking room and an underground jail (for punishment purposes only). The house also contains a confession room where contestants speak private matters to Bigg Boss.

== Series overview ==
Series	Hosts	House Location	Episodes	Originally released			Days	Housemates	Prize Money	Winner	Runner-up
Series	Hosts	House Location	Episodes	First released	Last released	Network	Days	Housemates	Prize Money	Winner	Runner-up
1	Kamal Haasan Silambarasan	Chennai	71	30 January 2022	10 April 2022	Disney+ Hotstar	70	16	₹35 lakh (US$36,000)	Balaji Murugadoss	Niroop Nandakumar

== Housemates Pattern ==
Clique	Season 1
Film & TV Actor/Actress	Abhinay Vaddi
Film & TV Actor/Actress	Anitha Sampath
Film & TV Actor/Actress	Shariq Hassan Khan
Film & TV Actor/Actress	Suja Varunee
Film & TV Actor/Actress	Suresh Chakravarthi
Film & TV Actor/Actress	Thaadi Balaji
Film & TV Actor/Actress	Vanitha Vijayakumar
Film & TV Actor/Actress	Ramya Pandian
Film & TV Actor/Actress	Abhirami Venkatachalam
Model	Balaji Murugadoss
Model	Niroop Nandakumar
Model	Suruthi Periyasamy
Non-celebrity	Thamarai Selvi
Non-celebrity	Maria Juliana
Singer/Lyricist	Snehan
Comedian	Sathish Kumar
Winner Runner-up Finalist

== Controversies ==
=== Bigg Boss Ultimate 1 ===
- Vanitha Vijayakumar argued with all the co housemates and Bigg Boss demanding that she won't participate in the luxury budget task until she receives coffee. She later went on to hide every housemates tea and milk since she isn't given her coffee.
- During the pressmeet luxury budget task, Niroop Nandhakumar confessed to every housemate saying that he was in a relationship with his co housemate Abhirami Venkatachalam before joining the game.
- During the live streaming, the camera focused on Abhirami Venkatachalam who was caught smoking in the smoking room. However the video wasn't censored and was telecasted, however audience were shocked by the act and accusing the company of promoting smoking.
- Niroop used cuss words against fellow contestant Maria Juliana, and the host's failure to punish him resulted in severe condemnation by the audience.
- Finale results of Maria Juliana and Thamarai ending up in 4th, 5th spots was questioned by the audience, who had expected them to be in the top 3. The legitimacy of the audience voting feature was questioned as a result.
- Niroop and Ramya were accused of bribing Pradeep Mil Roy to earn their spot in top 3
