= Hamam (soap) =

Indian brand of soap

- Product type: soap
- Current owner: Hindustan Unilever
- Country: india
- Introduced: 1931; 95 years ago
- Previous owners: Tata Sons

Hamam is a brand of soap made in India and marketed by the Indian unit of Unilever. The brand was previously owned by Tata Sons. The name comes from the Arabic/Persian word hammam, which refers to a public-bathing establishment in the Middle Eastern countries. It was once a leading bath soap brand in India. A 100-gm bar costs 30 ₹.

== About ==
Hamam soap was established in 1931 as a mild soap that could be used by families. Hamam used natural ingredients in its products long before using all-natural ingredients was a trend. It was, at one time, the only Indian-made natural soap. It is said to be pure and safe on the skin.

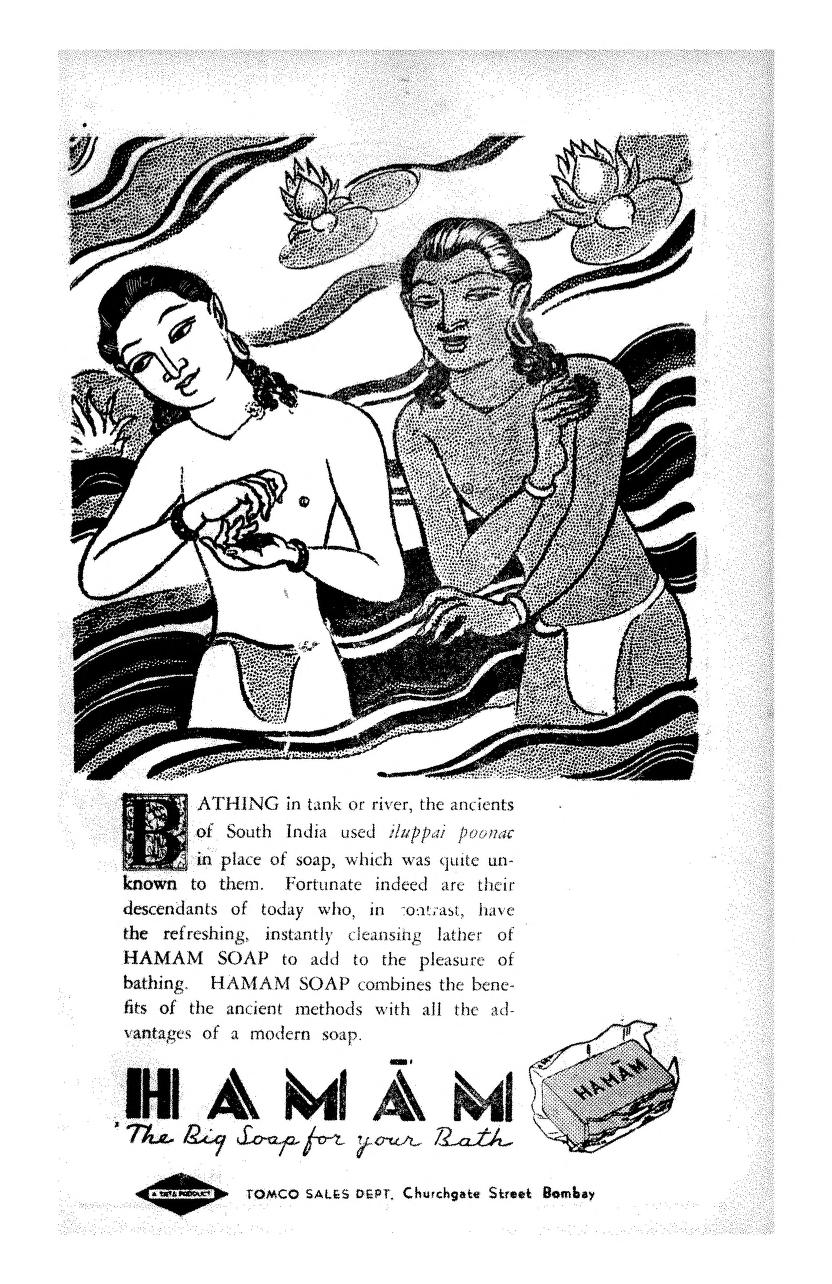
Hamam advertisement from 1945

Between 2009 and 2011, Hamam launched Hamam Nalangumavu soap. It has been withdrawn from the market due to regular Hamam's strong presence and lower sales numbers in the Nalangumavu variants.

== Making ==
Hamam soap has neem, tulsi, and aloe vera, which will protect the skin from rashes, pimples, and body odour.

== Variations ==
Hamam soap is sold in three different variations:

- Sampoorna Snaan
- Hamam Scrub Bath
- AbhyangaSnaan
