= Kaappaan =

2019 Indian Tamil-language action thriller film by K. V. Anand

- Theatrical release poster
- Directed by: K. V. Anand
- Written by: K. V. Anand; Pattukkottai Prabakar
- Produced by: Allirajah Subaskaran
- Starring: Suriya; Mohanlal; Arya
- Cinematography: Abinandhan Ramanujam; M. S. Prabhu
- Edited by: Anthony
- Music by: Harris Jayaraj
- Production company: Lyca Productions
- Release date: 20 September 2019
- Running time: 163 minutes
- Country: India
- Language: Tamil
- Budget: ₹75 crore
- Box office: ₹100 crore

Kaappaan (transl. Protector) is a 2019 Indian Tamil-language action thriller film directed by K. V. Anand, who co-wrote the script with Pattukkottai Prabakar. The film, produced by Lyca Productions, stars Suriya, Mohanlal and Arya in lead roles along with Sayyeshaa, Samuthirakani, Poorna, Boman Irani and Chirag Jani in supporting roles. The narrative revolves around a Special Protection Group (SPG) officer who struggles to protect the Prime Minister of India from a mysterious man who threatens to assassinate him.

The film was announced in January 2018. Filming took place between June 2018 and June 2019. The music was composed by Harris Jayaraj, with cinematography handled by Abhinandhan Ramanujam and M. S. Prabhu, and editing by Anthony. It was the final directorial work of Anand, before his death in 2021.

Kaappaan was released theatrically on 20 September 2019. The film received mixed reviews from critics but grossed ₹100 crore at the box office.

== Plot ==
Terrorists tried to kill the Prime Minister of India (PM), Chandrakanth Varma, when he was due to appear in Doordharshan's 100 year anniversary but security services were able to stop the attack, save the PM, and send him to his office. The government used NSG operations to prevent the assassination. However, the Minister for Communications, Vasudev, was killed as collateral damage, and his daughter Anjali is the PM's press secretary

Kathiravan "Kathir" is an organic farmer in Thanjavur who secretly works for the country's military intelligence. The SPG asks him to help protect the PM during his visit to London after a captured terrorist reveals a plot to assassinate him. Kathir identifies and shoots the suspect. Anjali, who mistakes Kathir for the assassin, tries to follow him, but he tricks her into getting drunk and loses her. Varma goes to India and discovers that the Pakistan army killed Indian soldiers in Baramulla District in Kashmir.Rajan Mahadev, a business tycoon and public figure, meets Varma to discuss ways of retaliation.

Joseph Selvaraj, Kathir's co-worker and friend, gets a death threat during Joseph and Priya's wedding anniversary celebration. Suddenly, a sniper kills his pet cat. Kathir and Joseph try to track the killer, but he diverts them by murdering the sniper with a small bomb blast and escapes. Varma goes to Kashmir to speak to the public, but a mysterious caller interferes with the communication system of the SPG and alerts them to a bomb on the stage where Varma is speaking. Kathir discovers the bomb and throws it away. However, the caller uses the distraction to detonate another bomb in Varma's car, killing him. After Varma's death, there is a struggle for the position of the next PM, but Varma's advisor chooses his son, Abhishek, to prevent a political divide.

Kathir gets suspended for failing to protect the PM. He discovers evidence that links their friend Ranjith, a disgraced double agent, to the killer. Ranjith seeks revenge on Kathir and the SPG for his arrest, which led to his family's suicide. In addition, farmers are protesting against the construction of mines in Thanjavur, which are destroying their crops. Abhishek plans to close the mines, but Mahadev, the owner, opposes the decision, resulting in a political conflict. Despite security warnings, Abhishek takes Anjali out for her birthday, and there is an assassination attempt on him that injures Anjali. Joseph dies while trying to save Abhishek. Kathir gets angry at Abhishek for going outside without security.

During the post-mortem, Kathir finds that one of his officers, Prem, has tried to tamper with the evidence. Prem reveals himself as a double agent who is in cahoots with Ranjith and was the one who killed Joseph while he was rescuing Abhishek. Meanwhile, male caelifera locusts suddenly infest the fields in Thanjavur. Mahadev orchestrated the outbreak because the farmers did not give up their land for his mining company. Mahadev is also the brain behind Varma's assassination, and Ranjith and Prem are simply his puppets. Abhishek and Mahadev discuss the ongoing feud and agree that in the immediate press conference, Mahadev will shut down his mines in Thanjavur. Mahadev seemingly agrees but secretly plans to release both male and female caelifera, which will ensure the destruction of the crops without any chances of revival and allow him to establish his mining company without further problems.

Kathir figures this out and destroys the train transporting the locusts, killing all the locusts. Ranjith enters the control room at the press conference and plans to kill Abhishek on Mahadev's orders. Kathir beats up Ranjith, who reveals that the bomb is with Anjali. Kathir calls Anjali to the control room, and they find that the cast on her broken arm contains the bomb. Kathir removes Anjali's cast and disposes of the bomb. Kathir rushes to protect Abhishek, but Ranjith says that Kathir's jacket has the bomb, and removing it will cause it to detonate. With Kathir frozen on the spot, Ranjith and Mahadev escape, enter the latter's car, and detonate the bomb, but the bomb explodes in the car, thus killing Mahadev and Ranjith on the spot. In a flashback, Kathir had found the bomb in the jacket earlier and left the bulletproof vest in Mahadev's car. In the end, Kathir and Anjali are seen having romantic moments in his hometown.

== Cast ==
- Suriya as Kathiravan
- Mohanlal as PM Chandrakanth Varma
- Arya as Abhishek (Abhi) Varma
- Sayyeshaa as Anjali Vasudev
- Samuthirakani as Joseph Selvaraj
- Shamna Kasim as Priya Joseph Selvaraj
- Boman Irani as Rajan Mahadev (voice dubbed by Nizhalgal Ravi)
- Chirag Jani as Ranjith Kumar
- Prem Kumar as Prem
- Kiran as Vivek
- Uma as Mrs. Varma
- Thalaivasal Vijay as Santhosh, Cabinet Secretary
- Paruthiveeran Sujatha as Kathiravan's mother
- Shankar Krishnamurthy as Sundhar
- Nagineedu as Sikander
- Swaminathan as Ramanujam
- Ravi Prakash as Shiva
- Manoj Lulla as Manoj
- R. N. R. Manohar as Member of Parliament
- Anitha Sampath as Kavitha
- Mayilsamy as Mayilsamy Police Officer in Patrol (Special appearance)
- Pattukkottai Prabakar as a journalist (special appearance)
- M. S. Prabhu in a special appearance
- Anthony as Irfan (special appearance)
- Karen Nikitha Harris (special appearance in the song "Vinnil Vinmeen")
- Danielle Haden as a dancer in the item number "Machan Inga Vandhira"

== Production ==
=== Development ===
In January 2018, Suriya announced that his next film, tentatively titled Suriya 38, would be directed by K. V. Anand, who earlier directed him in Ayan (2009) and Maattrraan (2012). A month later, Lyca Productions was announced to produce the film. The script was written by Pattukkottai Prabakar, rather than Anand's usual associates, the duo Subha, though Anand shared screenwriting credit. The technical crew includes editor Anthony, art director D. R. K. Kiran and stunt choreographers Peter Hein and Dhilp Subbaryan, continuing their association with the director from his previous films.

Initially, Gavemic U. Ary was announced as the cinematographer, but in a turn of events Abhinandhan Ramanujam replaced him. Later, he too left the project after the first schedule, apparently due to scheduling conflicts with cinematography commitments for the Malayalam film 9. Subsequently, M. S. Prabhu who collaborated with Suriya and Anand on Ayan, was finalised. While the film was announced without a title, the makers had registered three titles: Kaappaan, Meetpaan and Uyirkaa, and asked fans to choose the title through a Twitter poll. Although the majority of fans voted for Uyirkaa, on 31 December 2018, Lyca announced the film's title as Kaappaan.

=== Casting and filming ===
Allu Sirish initially agreed to act in the film, but later opted out due to scheduling conflicts with ABCD (2019), and was replaced by Arya. Amitabh Bachchan was approached to portray the Prime Minister of India as a cameo but later Mohanlal agreed to do it. Prem Kumar shot for the film simultaneously with Sarkar (2018). The film also marks Boman Irani's Tamil debut. Principal photography commenced on 25 June 2018, in London. The film was then planned to be shot in multiple locations across the world including New York, Brazil, New Delhi and Hyderabad. In March, an action sequence was filmed at Visakhapatnam. A month later, the makers shot a song sequence on Indonesia's Java island. Filming wrapped in June 2019.

== Soundtrack ==
Kaappaan

Soundtrack album by Harris Jayaraj
- Released: 21 July 2019
- Studio: Studio H
- Genre: Feature film soundtrack
- Length: 19:28
- Language: Tamil
- Label: Sony Music India
- Producer: Harris Jayaraj

Harris Jayaraj chronology
Dev (2019)	Kaappaan (2019)	The Legend (2022)

Singles from Kaappaan
- 1. "Siriki" Released: 5 July 2019; 2. "Kurilae Kurilae" Released: 19 July 2019

The soundtrack album is scored by Harris Jayaraj. The audio launch event was held on 21 July 2019 in Chennai. Harris' daughter Karen Nikita Harris made her debut as a singer with the song "Vinnil Vinmeen".

Upon release, the album received a positive review from Firstpost, commenting that "Harris Jayraj composes yet another album loaded with chartbusters for Suriya's film. Dipped in quintessential Harris signature, the album offers different styles of music, ending up with different results."

Tamil Track-List
No.	Title	Lyrics	Singer(s)	Length
1.	"Siriki"	S. Gnanakaravel	Senthil Ganesh, Rockstar Ramani Ammal	04:43
2.	"Vinnil Vinmeen"	Vairamuthu	Nikitha Harris	03:54
3.	"Hey Amigo"	Vairamuthu	Leslee Lewis, Jonita Gandhi	04:32
4.	"Kurilae Kurilae"	Kabilan	Javed Ali, Darshana KT	04:21
5.	"Machan Inga Vandhira"	Kabilan Vairamuthu, GK	Kharesma Ravichandran, Nikhita Gandhi, Shabnam Muthu Munas	03:38
Total length:				19:28

Telugu Track-List
No.	Title	Lyrics	Singer(s)	Length
1.	"Yenno Thaarala Sangamam"	Vanamali	Nikitha Harris	03:49
2.	"Seruku"	Chandrabose	Senthildass Velayutham, Senthil Ganesh, Ramani Ammal	04:43
3.	"Hey Amigo"	Vanamali	Jonita Gandhi, Haricharan, Leslie Lewis	04:32
4.	"Mecha Ninne"	Vanamali	Nikhita Gandhi	03:36
5.	"Palike Palike"	Chandrabose	Javed Ali, Darshana KT, Pravin Saivi	04:22
Total length:				19:20

== Release ==
Initially, the makers announced that the film is scheduled to release on 30 August 2019, but considering the release of Saaho, which was scheduled on the same date, the release was pushed to 20 September 2019. A Telugu dubbed version titled Bandobast was released simultaneously with the Tamil version. Ahead of the film's release, in late August, A. John Charles, an aspiring screenwriter, filed a petition in the Madras High Court accusing the filmmakers of plagiarism. He revealed that he wrote a script titled Saravedi which was registered in 2016, and even discussed the script with Anand in January 2017, but was shocked to find similarities between the teaser of Kaappaan teaser and the script of Saravedi, since the script of Kaappaan was credited to Prabakar, and subsequently called for a stay on the film's release. However, on 12 September, the court dismissed the petition, citing lack of evidence.

== Reception ==
=== Critical reception ===
Kaappaan received mixed reviews from critics. M Suganth of The Times of India rated the film 2 out of 5 stars stating "KV Anand's Kaappaan feels like one of those patriotic films that Vijayakanth and Arjun frequently made in the 90s, but is not as entertaining as those". Sify rated it 2 out of 5 stars stating "Usually Anand's films stand out in the technical department but here everything is strictly average including music, cinematography, writing and editing". Gautaman Bhaskaran of News18 rated the film 1 out of 5 stars and stated "Despite big names from the industry, the plot of Kaappaan wanders and loses its focus". Sreedhar Pillai for Firstpost gave 2.25 out of 5 stars stating "Kaappaan starts with a bang and moves at a rapid pace, but somewhere towards the middle it gets bogged down and runs out of ideas". Srivatsan S of The Hindu stated, "KV Anand's latest collaboration with his favourite leading man is a painstakingly long thriller, that neither has soul nor brain".

The New Indian Express rated the film 1.5 out of 5 stars stating "Never do you truly believe that this film has a real understanding of the world and its politics." S. Subhakeerthana of The Indian Express rated 1 out of 5 stars stating "KV Anand fills Kaappaaan with props, in his never-ending endeavour to create that elusive surreal ambience. But the film has artificiality written all over." Anupama Subramanian of Deccan Chronicle rated 2.5 out of 5 stars stating "Kaappaan plays a big game and is very commercial in nature." Sowmya Rajendran of The News Minute rated 2 out of 5 stars stating "Other than Suriya, nobody in the SPG looks like they've even slow jogged on the treadmill, let alone performed miraculous high security ops." Lakshmi Subramanian of The Week rated 2 out of 5 stars stating "The predictable screenplay, which reminds you of some old Vijayakanth or Arjun films, is disappointing as it comes from Anand who has had some decent outings with Suriya earlier, like Maattraan and Ayan."

=== Box office ===
In its opening weekend, the film collected ₹23 crore (US$3.27 million) in Tamil Nadu, which at the time made it one of the highest-grossing opening weekends in Tamil film history. The film collected approximately ₹50 crore (US$7.1 million) worldwide in its first weekend. Kaappaan earned around ₹100 crore worldwide.
