= Anitha Sampath =

Indian actress

- Born: Anitha; 12 June 1992 (age 34); Chennai, Tamil Nadu, India
- Occupations: Actress; news anchor
- Years active: 2008 – 2023
- Spouse: Prabhagaran (m. 2019)
- Parent: R.C.Sampath

Anitha Sampath is an Indian news anchor and actress who appears in Tamil-language films.

== Career ==
Anitha Sampath has worked as a news anchor on Polimer TV, News7 Tamil, Tamilan TV, and Sun TV. She has also worked on the morning show Vanakam Tamizha on Sun TV. Sampath made cameo appearances in Sarkar (2018) and Kaappaan (2019), playing the role of a newsreader in both films. In 2020, Sampath played the role of Dr. Meera Krishnan in the web series Emergency, which aired on YouTube. She also featured prominently in Danny, which was produced by P.G. Muthiah.

== Personal Life ==
She entered into a love marriage with Prabhagaran on August 25, 2019.

== Cinematography ==
Year	Movie	Part	Reference
2018	Kala	News reader	
2018	Sarkar	News reader	
2018	2.0		
2019	Kaappaan	Kavitha (a news reader)	
2019	Aadithya Varma		
2020	Avasaram	Meera Krishnan	Web series
2020	Darbar		
2020	Irumbu Manithar		
2020	Danny	Mathi	
