= Bigg Boss (Tamil TV series) season 1 =

Indian Tamil-language reality show

Bigg Boss
- Season 1
- Bigg Boss Tamil 1 logo
- Presented by: Kamal Haasan
- No. of days: 98
- No. of housemates: 19
- Winner: Arav
- Runner-up: Snehan
- No. of episodes: 98

Release
- Original network: Star Vijay
- Original release: 25 June – 30 September 2017

Season chronology
- Next → Season 2

Bigg Boss is the first season of the Tamil-language reality TV show Bigg Boss Tamil which is the Tamil version of the Big Brother. The first season aired on Star Vijay from June 25, 2017, to September 30, 2017. The season's presenter was Kamal Haasan and a lavish house set was constructed at EVP theme park, Chennai. This season is the shortest season in the Bigg Boss Tamil series excluding the Ultimate series.

The winner of the season was model/actor, Arav who received a cash prize of ₹50 lakh. Lyricist Snehan Sivaselvam was the runner-up.

Snehan, Suja Varunee and Maria Juliana returned as contestants in Bigg Boss Ultimate season 1. While Bindu Madhavi returned as a contestant in Bigg Boss Non-Stop season 1 and eventually she won it.

== Housemate status ==
SR	Housemates	Day entered	Day exited	Status
1	Arav	Day 1	Day 98	Winner
2	Snehan	Day 1	Day 98	1st Runner-up
3	Harish	Day 46	Day 98	2nd Runner-up
4	Ganesh	Day 1	Day 98	3rd Runner-up
5	Bindu	Day 35	Day 96	4th Runner-up
6	Suja	Day 46	Day 77	Secret Room
6	Suja	Day 77	Day 91	Evicted
7	Vaiyapuri	Day 1	Day 84	Evicted
8	Kaajal	Day 46	Day 70	Evicted
9	Raiza	Day 1	Day 62	Evicted
10	Gayathri	Day 1	Day 56	Evicted
11	Shakthi	Day 1	Day 49	Evicted
12	Juliana	Day 1	Day 42	Evicted
13	Oviya	Day 1	Day 41	Walked
14	Namitha	Day 1	Day 28	Evicted
15	Harathi	Day 1	Day 21	Evicted
16	Ganja	Day 1	Day 14	Evicted
17	Bharani	Day 1	Day 14	Ejected
18	Anuya	Day 1	Day 7	Evicted
19	Sri	Day 1	Day 4	Walked

== Original entrants ==
The entry of contestants in order:

1. Sri, an actor best known for playing the lead role in the films Vazhakku Enn 18/9 (2012) and Maanagaram (2017).
2. Anuya Bhagvath, an actress best known for playing the lead role in Siva Manasula Sakthi (2009).
3. Vaiyapuri, an actor who has primarily appeared as a comedian in Tamil films.
4. Gayathri Raghuram, an actress, choreographer and politician who has worked in Tamil films.
5. Bharani, an actor best known for playing a lead role in Naadodigal (2009).
6. Raiza Wilson, a model and former beauty-pageant contestant from Bangalore.
7. Snehan, a lyricist, poet, actor and motivational speaker who has worked in Tamil films.
8. Oviya, an actress who has appeared in leading roles in the films Kalavani (2010), Marina (2012) and Kalakalappu (2012).
9. Harathi Ganesh, an actress who has primarily appeared as a comedienne in Tamil films.
10. Arav, a model and actor from Tiruchchirapalli who has starred in Saithan (2016).
11. Ganja Karuppu, an actor who has primarily appeared as a comedian in Tamil films.
12. Maria Juliana, a former nurse who rose to fame as an activist during the 2017 Jallikattu protests.
13. Ganesh Venkatraman, an actor and former model who has appeared in supporting roles in the films Abhiyum Naanum (2008), Unnaipol Oruvan (2009), and Thani Oruvan (2015).
14. Shakthi Vasudevan, an actor best known for playing leading roles in Thottal Poo Malarum (2007) and Shivalinga (2017).
15. Namitha, an actress who has appeared in leading roles in the films Aai (2004), Billa (2007) and Azhagiya Tamil Magan (2007).

=== Wildcard entrants ===
1. Bindu Madhavi, an actress who has appeared in leading roles in the films Kazhugu (2012), Kedi Billa Killadi Ranga (2013), and Desingu Raja (2013).
2. Suja Varunee, an actress and dancer who has appeared in supporting roles in the films Milaga (2010) and Pencil (2016).
3. Harish Kalyan, an actor best known for playing leading roles in the films Sindhu Samaveli (2010) and Poriyaalan (2014).
4. Kaajal Pasupathi, an actress and video jockey known for her roles in Ko (2011) and Mounaguru (2011).

== Nominations table ==
	Week 1	Week 2	Week 3	Week 4	Week 5	Week 6	Week 7		Week 8	Week 9	Week 10	Week 11	Week 12	Week 13	Week 14 (GRAND FINALE)		
	Week 1	Week 2	Week 3	Week 4	Week 5	Week 6	Day 43	Day 46	Week 8	Week 9	Week 10	Week 11	Week 12	Week 13	Day 97	Day 98	
House Captain	Snehan	Gayathri	Ganesh	Shakthi	Snehan	No; Captain	Raiza		Bindu	Harish	No; Captain	Vaiyapuri	Arav	Snehan	No; Captain		
Captain's Nomination	Juliana; Sri	Bharani; Ganja	Oviya; Harathi	Vaiyapuri; Namitha	Juliana; Oviya	No; Captain	Nominations; Rejected	Vaiyapuri	Gayathri; Arav	Raiza; Bindu	No; Captain	Suja; Harish	Snehan; Harish	Immune	No; Captain		
Vote to:	Evict							Save	Evict						Win		
Arav	Anuya; Raiza	Bharani; Ganja	Harathi; Juliana	Ganesh; Namitha	Juliana; Gayathri	Shakthi; Oviya	Nominations; Rejected	Vaiyapuri	Gayathri; Raiza	Snehan; Bindu	Suja; Vaiyapuri	Suja; Ganesh	House; Captain	Nominated	Finalist	Winner (Day 98)	
Snehan	House; Captain	Bharani; Oviya	Oviya; Vaiyapuri	Vaiyapuri; Oviya	House; Captain	Juliana; Oviya	Nominations; Rejected	Vaiyapuri	Ganesh; Arav	Raiza; Ganesh	Arav; Kaajal	Arav; Ganesh	Arav; Harish	House; Captain	Ticket To; Finale Winner; Finalist	1st Runner-Up (Day 98)	
Harish	Not in House								Exempt	House; Captain	Kaajal; Arav	Ganesh; Bindu	Vaiyapuri; Arav	Nominated	Finalist	2nd Runner-Up (Day 98)	
Ganesh	Ganja; Sri	Bharani; Ganja	House; Captain	Oviya; Namitha	Oviya; Juliana	Oviya; Juliana	Nominations; Rejected	Vaiyapuri	Gayathri; Raiza	Raiza; Vaiyapuri	Arav; Kaajal	Suja; Snehan	Vaiyapuri; Bindu	Nominated	Finalist	3rd Runner-Up (Day 98)	
Bindu	Not in House					Juliana; Gayathri	Nominations; Rejected	Vaiyapuri	House; Captain	Raiza; Snehan	Kaajal; Arav	Suja; Harish	Vaiyapuri; Snehan	Nominated	Finalist	4th Runner-Up (Day 97)	
Suja	Not in House								Exempt	Vaiyapuri; Raiza	Arav; Kaajal	Bindu; Snehan	Arav; Snehan	Nominated	Evicted (Day 91)		
Vaiyapuri	Sri; Anuya	Bharani; Namitha	Namitha; Oviya	Ganesh; Namitha	Gayathri; Juliana	Juliana; Raiza	Nominations; Rejected	Himself	Gayathri; Raiza	Raiza; Ganesh	Kaajal; Suja	House; Captain	Harish; Bindu	Evicted (Day 84)			
Kaajal	Not in House								Exempt	Vaiyapuri; Snehan	Vaiyapuri; Bindu	Evicted (Day 70)					
Raiza	Gayathri; Juliana	Juliana; Oviya	Juliana; Oviya	Oviya; Juliana	Juliana; Oviya	Oviya; Ganesh	House; Captain		Vaiyapuri; Gayathri	Vaiyapuri; Snehan	Evicted (Day 65)						
Gayathri	Raiza; Juliana	House; Captain	Oviya; Juliana	Ganesh; Oviya	Oviya; Arav	Oviya; Arav	Nominations; Rejected	Vaiyapuri	Raiza; Vaiyapuri	Evicted (Day 56)							
Shakthi	Sri; Ganja	Raiza; Bharani	Harathi; Oviya	House; Captain	Oviya; Arav	Oviya; Juliana	Nominations; Rejected	Vaiyapuri	Evicted (Day 49)								
Juliana	Anuya; Raiza	Bharani; Ganja	Harathi; Vaiyapuri	Oviya; Namitha	Arav; Ganesh	Oviya; Ganesh	Evicted (Day 42)										
Oviya	Ganja; Sri	Ganja; Raiza	Gayathri; Raiza	Ganesh; Namitha	Juliana; Ganesh	Arav; Raiza	Walked (Day 41)										
Namitha	Sri; Anuya	Bharani; Oviya	Vaiyapuri; Juliana	Ganesh; Oviya	Evicted (Day 28)												
Harathi	Juliana; Sri	Ganesh; Arav	Shakthi; Juliana	Evicted (Day 21)													
Bharani	Sri; Raiza	Ganja; Namitha	Ejected (Day 14)														
Ganja	Sri; Anuya	Bharani; Oviya	Evicted (Day 14)														
Anuya	Harathi; Juliana	Evicted (Day 7)															
Sri	Gayathri; Shakthi	Walked (Day 4)															
Note	1	2	none		3, 4	5, 6, 7, 9	8, 10, 11, 12		13	13, 14	7, 15	16, 17, 18	19, 20	21	7, 22		
Against public vote	Anuya; Juliana; Raiza; ~~Sri~~	Bharani; Ganja; Oviya; Raiza	Harathi; Juliana; Oviya; Vaiyapuri; Raiza	Ganesh; Namitha; Oviya	Arav; Juliana; Oviya; Raiza	Juliana; ~~Oviya~~; Vaiyapuri	Arav; Bindu; Ganesh; Gayathri; Shakthi; Snehan; Vaiyapuri	Arav; Bindu; Ganesh; ~~Gayathri~~; Shakthi; Snehan; Raiza	Gayathri; Raiza	Raiza; Snehan; Vaiyapuri	Arav; Kaajal; Snehan; Suja	Bindu; Ganesh; Harish; Suja	Arav; Harish; ~~Snehan~~; Vaiyapuri	Arav; Bindu; Ganesh; Harish; Suja	Arav; Bindu; Ganesh; Harish; Snehan		
Walked	Sri	none				Oviya	none										
Ejected	none	Bharani	none														
Evicted	Anuya	Ganja	Harathi	Namitha	No; Eviction	Juliana	Shakthi		Gayathri	Raiza	Kaajal	Suja	Vaiyapuri	Suja	Bindu	Ganesh	Harish
Evicted	Anuya	Ganja	Harathi	Namitha	No; Eviction	Juliana	Shakthi		Gayathri	Raiza	Kaajal	Suja	Vaiyapuri	Suja	Bindu	Snehan	Arav

=== Notes ===
indicates the House Captain.
indicates that the housemate was directly nominated for eviction prior to the regular nominations process.
indicates that the housemate was granted immunity from nominations.
indicates that an evicted housemate returned temporarily to the house as a guest.
indicates that the housemate moved to the Secret Room.

- ^Note 1: Sri left the show on day 4 because of his poor health conditions.
- ^Note 2: Bharani was ejected from the show for breaking the Bigg Boss rule by trying to escape from the house.
- ^Note 3: Raiza was automatically nominated for eviction for Week 5 during Week 4 as punishment for talking about the eviction nominees despite being forbidden to do so.
- ^Note 4: There was no eviction during Week 5; however, the housemates still nominated their fellow housemates for eviction without knowing that there would be no eviction.
- ^Note 5: Snehan was saved from eviction while Vaiyapuri was nominated for eviction for Week 6 during Week 5 by Arav and Gayathri, who both had the power to save and nominate one housemate each for eviction in their role of Junior Bigg Boss for a day.
- ^Note 6: As the new housemate, Bindu Madhavi was granted immunity from nomination for Week 6.
- ^Note 7: There was no House Captain for Weeks 6, 10 and 14.
- ^Note 8: After ending up on the losing side in a daily task during Week 6, housemates in the winning team nominated Arav for eviction for Week 7.
- ^Note 9: Oviya left the show because of mental stress arising due to tension in relationships with Arav and the other housemates.
- ^Note 10: All the housemates except Raiza (and Arav who was already nominated) were nominated for eviction for Week 7 as they did not provide valid reasons while nominating a housemate for eviction, as a result of which Raiza became the House Captain for Week 7 by default.
- ^Note 11: Vaiyapuri was chosen to be saved from the Week 7 eviction by the other housemates.
- ^Note 12: Gayathri was saved from Week 7 eviction after winning a task in which housemates had to answer five questions about the Bigg Boss house.
- ^Note 13: As the new housemates, Suja, Harish and Kajal were granted immunity from nominations for Weeks 8 and 9.
- ^Note 14: After winning a daily task during Week 8, Arav was granted immunity from nomination for Week 9.
- ^Note 15: Snehan was nominated for Week 10 eviction during Week 9 at the end of the luxury budget task wherein the nomination for Week 10 eviction changed between the housemates.
- ^Note 16: Although Harathi, Juliana and Shakthi were guests in the Bigg Boss house and ex-contestants, they were allowed to nominate the other housemates for eviction.
- ^Note 17: Though Snehan received a sufficient number of votes to be nominated for Week 11 eviction, he was saved from nomination by Ganesh with the help of the joker card he received as a prize for winning a daily task during Week 8. After being saved, Snehan nominated Bindu as his replacement for Week 11 eviction.
- ^Note 18: Suja was evicted by the regular eviction process, however in accordance with the Secret Room twist, she was moved to a temporary abode and stayed there for a day before returning to the house on Day 78. Following her return, she has also exempted from nomination for the Week 12 eviction, though she could nominate the other housemates.
- ^Note 19: Even though Arav was the House Captain for Week 12, he was still eligible to be nominated for Week 12 eviction.
- ^Note 20: As Snehan won the Golden Ticket during Week 12, he was granted immunity till the final week.
- ^Note 21: Since Snehan was already a finalist, he was made House Captain for Week 13 by default while the rest of the housemates were automatically nominated for eviction.
- ^Note 22: All finalists were nominated for a mid-week eviction. Bindu was evicted and declared as the 4th runner up of Bigg Boss during the mid-week eviction as she received the fewest public votes to win Bigg Boss.

== Guests ==
Week(s)	Days(s)	Guest(s)	Purpose of Visit
4	Day 25	Tamil Thalaivas	To promote their team for the 2017 Pro Kabaddi League season.
7	Day 45	A thief (Sridhar) and a clown	As part of a daily task, to get the attention of the housemates.
8	Day 52	An exorcist	As a part of a luxury budget, to play an exorcist role in the prank of a particular housemate.
9	Day 59	Masked man to steal eggs	Punishment for the contestants, as Raiza broke the house rule by sleeping in the daytime.
9	Day 61	A referee and two wrestlers (one male and another female)	To wrestle with the housemates as part of a daily task.
10	Day 64 – 70	Harathi Ganesh and Maria Juliana	They re-entered the house as guests for a week.
11	Day 70 – 77	Harathi Ganesh and Maria Juliana	Stay as house guests extended for another week.
11	Day 70 – 77	Shakthi Vasudevan	Shakthi re-entered the house as a guest for a week.
11	Day 73	Vaiyapuri's family, Bindu's friends and Harish's parents	To surprise Vaiyapuri, Bindu and Harish respectively as part of the week's luxury budget task.
11	Day 74	Snehan's father and Ganesh's wife Nisha Krishnan	To surprise Snehan and Ganesh respectively as part of the week's luxury budget task.
11	Day 75	Arav's friend, brother and nephew and Suja's mother and sister	To surprise Arav and Suja respectively as part of the week's luxury budget task.
11	Day 76	Vishnu and Catherine Tresa	To promote their movie Kathanayagan.
12	Day 84	Kamal Haasan	Visited the house to announce the Golden Ticket winner.
14	Day 92	Anjali	To promote her movie Balloon.
14	Day 96	A thief (Sridhar) and drummers (Arjun and Suman)	To distract the housemates, as a part of the daily task.
14	Day 98	All evicted/ejected/walked housemates except Sri and Namitha	Invited for the Bigg Boss Tamil grand finale.
14	Day 98	Ganesh's wife Nisha Krishnan	To escort Ganesh out of the Bigg Boss house after he finished fourth.
14	Day 98	Oviya (ex-contestant)	To escort Harish out of the Bigg Boss house after he finished third.
14	Day 98	Kamal Haasan	To escort the remaining two housemates – Arav and Snehan – from the Bigg Boss house to the finale stage.

== Controversies ==
- Bigg Boss Tamil 1 fame Bharani was eliminated from the show as he tried to escape the BB house by jumping off the wall. He was mentally strained due to the treatment of the housemates. His exit sparked a controversy with the viewers slamming the contestants for their inappropriate behaviour towards Bharani.

== Weekly summary ==
Week's	Context	Notes
Week 1	Entrances	Sri, Anuya Bhagvath, Vaiyapuri, Gayathri Raguram, Bharani, Raiza Wilson, Snehan, Oviya, Harathi Ganesh, Arav, Ganja Karuppu, Maria Juliana, Ganesh Venkatraman, Shakthi Vasudevan entered the Bigg Boss house on Day 0. Namitha entered as a wildcard entrant on Day 1.
Week 1	House Captain	Snehan
Week 1	Nominations	Anuya, Juliana and Sri
Week 1	Luxury Budget Tasks	Identifying childhood photos of fellow housemates
Week 1	Exits	Sri left the house on Day 4 due to health problems.; Anuya was evicted on Day 7.
Week 2
Week 2	House Captain	Gayathri
Week 2	Nominations	Bharani, Ganja and Oviya
Week 2	Luxury Budget Tasks	Meendum Palli ku Pogalam (learning Tamil in school setting)
Week 2	Exits	Ganja was evicted on Day 14.; Bharani was ejected on Day 14 for trying to escape from the house.
Week 3
Week 3	House Captain	Ganesh
Week 3	Nominations	Harathi, Juliana, Oviya and Vaiyapuri
Week 3	Luxury Budget Tasks	Dance marathon (dressing up as a Tamil film star and dancing to his film song which is played at random)
Week 3	Exits	Harathi was evicted on Day 21.
Week 4
Week 4	House Captain	Shakthi
Week 4	Nominations	Ganesh, Namitha and Oviya
Week 4	Luxury Budget Tasks	Thiruda Thiruda (who stole the diamond)
Week 4	Exits	Namitha was evicted on Day 28.
Week 5
Week 5	House Captain	Snehan
Week 5	Nominations	Arav, Juliana, Oviya and Raiza
Week 5	Luxury Budget Tasks	Ottam Mudinthal Attam Mudiyum (cycling to access kitchen, bedroom and bathroom)
Week 5	Exits	None
Week 6	Entrances	Bindu Madhavi entered the Bigg Boss house on Day 35.
Week 6	House Captain	None
Week 6	Nominations	Juliana and Vaiyapuri
Week 6	Luxury Budget Tasks	Bigg Boss Research Centre (mental hospital tasks)
Week 6	Exits	Oviya walked out of the show on Day 41; Juliana was evicted on Day 42.
Week 7	House Captain	Raiza
Week 7	Nominations	Arav, Bindu, Ganesh, Gayathri, Shakthi, Snehan and Vaiyapuri
Week 7	Luxury Budget Tasks	Bigg Boss Laundry Centre (washing, sewing and ironing clothes from outside in the traditional manner)
Week 7	Exits	Shakthi was evicted on Day 49.
Week 8	Entrances	Suja Varunee, Harish Kalyan & Kaajal Pasupathi entered the Bigg Boss house on Days 52, 53 & 54 respectively.
Week 8	House Captain	Bindu
Week 8	Nominations	Gayathri and Raiza
Week 8	Luxury Budget Tasks	Bigg Boss Veettil Pei Nadamattam (secret task among housemates to select one housemate and make them believe the house is haunted by ghosts)
Week 8	Exits	Gayathri was evicted on Day 56.
Week 9
Week 9	House Captain	Harish
Week 9	Nominations	Raiza, Snehan and Vaiyapuri
Week 9	Luxury Budget Tasks	Nominations Changer (changing nomination for Week 10 eviction between housemates)
Week 9	Exits	Raiza was evicted on Day 63.
Week 10
Week 10	House Captain	None
Week 10	Nominations	Arav, Kaajal and Snehan
Week 10	Luxury Budget Tasks	NRI Kudumbam vs. Madurai Kudumbam (Housemates divided into 2 teams – NRI Kudumbam and Madurai Kudumbam – to perform the daily tasks. The winning team was exempted from performing the tasks for the rest of the week.)
Week 10	Exits	Kaajal was evicted on Day 70.
Week 11
Week 11	House Captain	Vaiyapuri
Week 11	Nominations	Bindu, Ganesh, Harish and Suja
Week 11	Luxury Budget Tasks	Freeze and Release (Housemates must freeze in their positions when Bigg Boss says 'Freeze' and should not move again until Bigg Boss says 'Release'; housemates were punished for failure.)
Week 11	Exits	Suja was sent to the Secret Room on Day 77.
Week 12
Week 12	Entrances	Suja Varunee re-entered the Bigg Boss house on Day 78 after spending a day in the Secret Room.
Week 12	House Captain	Arav
Week 12	Nominations	Arav, Harish, Snehan and Vaiyapuri
Week 12	Luxury Budget Tasks	Ticket to Finale Part 1 (The winner of a series of tasks for the week will receive the Golden Ticket which will give immunity from eviction nomination for the rest of the show.)
Week 12	Exits	Vaiyapuri was evicted on Day 84.
Week 13
Week 13	House Captain	Snehan
Week 13	Nominations	Arav, Bindu, Ganesh, Harish and Suja
Week 13	Luxury Budget Tasks	Ticket to Finale Part 2 (Housemates have to perform tasks assigned by the Bigg Boss who communicates through a telephone.)
Week 13	Exits	Suja was evicted on Day 91.
Week 14
Week 14	House Captain	None
Week 14	Luxury Budget Tasks	N/A
Week 14	Finalists	During the final week the public vote for who they want to win Bigg Boss. The finalists for the title were as following: •Arav •Harish Kalyan •Ganesh Venkatraman •Bindu Madhavi •Snehan
Week 14	Winner	Arav
Week 14	Runner-Up	Snehan
Week 14	Third Place	Harish Kalyan
Week 14	Fourth Place	Ganesh Venkatraman
Week 14	Fifth Place	Bindu Madhavi

== Reception ==
After the launch of the show, the viewership of the channel increased by 10%. The series garnered a low rating of 5.2 TVR in debut week with 5.6 million impressions and 5.4 million impressions for premiere episode. It improved further the following weeks where it averaged 8.4 TVR for a six weeks average ratings.
