= Ispade Rajavum Idhaya Raniyum =

2019 Tamil film directed by Ranjit Jeyakodi

- Theatrical release poster
- Directed by: Ranjit Jeyakodi
- Written by: Ranjit Jeyakodi
- Produced by: Balaji Kapa
- Starring: Harish Kalyan; Shilpa Manjunath; Ma Ka Pa Anand; Bala Saravanan
- Cinematography: Kavin Raj
- Edited by: Bavan Sreekumar
- Music by: Sam C. S.
- Production company: Madhav Media
- Release date: 15 March 2019
- Running time: 153 minutes
- Country: India
- Language: Tamil

Ispade Rajavum Idhaya Raniyum (transl. King of Spades and Queen of Hearts) is a 2019 Indian Tamil language romance film by Ranjit Jeyakodi. The film stars Harish Kalyan and Shilpa Manjunath, while Ma Ka Pa Anand, Bala Saravanan, Suresh, and Ponvannan act in the supporting roles. Sam C. S. composed the film's soundtrack and score, while cinematography is handled by Kavin Raj and editing is done by Bavan Sreekumar. The film was released on 15 March 2019 to mixed-to-positive reviews and become a box office hit. The film was loosely based on the Spanish film Three Steps Above Heaven.

== Plot ==
The story revolves around Gautham, an unemployed youth, and his love interest, Thara, who belongs to the elite class and is engaged to a family friend, Rohith. Gautham's parents are divorced, and his mother is married to another person. Gautham hates his mother, and due to this, he had a broken childhood. Gautham is not able to control his anger. He is overly possessive and abusive. Thara, on the other hand, is a free-spirited girl. She is understanding and tolerates Gautham to a point. When his anger reaches its peak, she calls off her relationship. They soon reconcile. But despite asking him to control his anger multiple times, Gautham continues to be the same. He also slaps Thara's father and beats up Rohit when being engaged in an argument. Thara's wedding with Rohit is rushed after all this. On the day before marriage, Thara realises that she can't live without Gautham and goes in search of him. On the other hand, a drunken Gautham listens to a beggar as he tells him a story. The beggar says that he killed his girlfriend's dog because it bit her and that everyone accused him of being mentally ill for it. Gautham recalls his behaviour towards Thara. Thara arrives to where Gautham is and tells him that she wants him back. When they both hug each other, Gautham thinks of killing her. The next moment he is filled with guilt and realises that the relationship will destroy her. He tells her the same and leaves her when a heartbroken Thara stands there helplessly. Gautham sets out on a journey to forget Thara completely, while Thara becomes determined to find Gautham and reconcile with him.

== Cast ==
- Harish Kalyan as Gautham
- Shilpa Manjunath as Thara
- Ma Ka Pa Anand as Anand, Gautham's friend
- Bala Saravanan as Kumar, Gautham's friend
- Suresh as Thara's father
- Ponvannan as Gautham's father
- Lizzie Antony as Charulatha, Gautham's mother
- Mathew Varghese as Charulatha's second husband
- Ashwanth Thilak as Motorbike Driver
- Adithya Shivpink as Rohith
- Karthick Raj as Rohith's friend
- Maari as Gautham's friend
- "Put Chutney" Rajmohan as Lawyer
- Sujatha Panju as Thara's mother
- Dhivya Duraisamy as Anand's pair
- Master Avanish as Young Gautham
- Ranjit Jeyakodi as Drug addict (Cameo appearance)

== Production ==
The project was announced by director Ranjit Jeyakodi who previously directed the film Puriyatha Puthir. Harish Kalyan plays in the film and marks his second successive film as lead actor after Pyaar Prema Kaadhal (2018). The title of the film was announced with the film's first look. The phrase Ispade Raja in the film title implies the meaning of King of Spades while Idhaya Rani in the title of the film implies Queen of Hearts.

== Music ==
Ispade Rajavum Idhaya Raniyum

Soundtrack album by Sam C. S.
- Released: 14 February 2019
- Recorded: 2018–2019
- Genre: Feature film soundtrack
- Length: 20:04
- Language: Tamil
- Label: Think Music
- Producer: Sam C. S.

Sam C. S. chronology
Adanga Maru (2018)	Ispade Rajavum Idhaya Raniyum (2019)	K-13 (2019)

Singles from Ispade Rajavum Idhaya Raniyum
- 1. "Kannamma" Released: 11 January 2019; 2. "Yei Kadavule" Released: 23 January 2019

The soundtrack album of Ispade Rajavum Idhaya Raniyum, featured music composed by Sam C. S. who also wrote lyrics for all the songs. The film marks Sam's second collaboration with director Ranjit, after Puriyatha Puthir (2017). In December 2018, it was revealed that actor Vijay Sethupathi had rendered one song for the film, along with actor Harish Kalyan, who also made his singing debut through this film. Later in January 2019, Anirudh Ravichander also recorded one song for the film. By mid-January Sam had wrapped up composition for the songs. A teaser of the song "Kannamma" sung by Anirudh was released on 9 January 2019, and the full song was released as the first single on 11 January 2019. The second single "Yei Kadavulae" was released on 23 January 2019. The full album was unveiled on 14 February 2019, coinciding with Valentine's Day, and the audio launch was held on Airtel Super Singer reality show, which was aired on Star Vijay. Singer Harish Kalyan does a reprised version of "Kannamma" which was released by Think Music on 25 June 2020.

No.	Title	Singer(s)	Length
1.	"Kannamma"	Anirudh Ravichander	4:16
2.	"Yei Kadavulae"	Harish Kalyan, Vijay Sethupathi	4:53
3.	"Sandaali"	Paul Prakash	3:46
4.	"Yendi Raasathi"	D. Sathyaprakash, Roshini	3:20
5.	"Yeno Pennae"	D. Sathyaprakash, Swagatha S. Krishnan	3:46

The songs of Ispade Rajavum Idhaya Raniyum eventually received rave reviews from the audience, especially youngsters. Jyothi Prabhakar of The Times of India, reviewed it as "The songs of Ispade Rajavum Idhaya Raniyum are hummable, danceable, and very likeable. No wonder, a couple of them are already tripping the charts. Sam CS has done a great job of getting the right mix of sounds and voices to keep all the songs, even the ones that intersect ‘sad scenes’ in the movie, from getting maudlin and noisy. As a rule, instead of varying the beats to fast and slow to keep pace with the emotions, Sam has kept the tempo going strong for all the songs, which works for the album as a whole."

== Release ==
The film was released on 1 March 2019.

== Reception ==
The film received mixed reviews from critics. Sreedhar Pillai of Firstpost gave 2 out of 5 stating "Ispade Rajavum Idhaya Raniyum is a watered-down version of Arjun Reddy, being too lengthy with a long drawn-out-second half." India Today gave 2 out of 5 stars and stated "The climax of Ispade Rajavum Idhaya Raniyum promotes a much-needed message about rejection. But, throughout the film, the director shows otherwise. In the end, there is a monologue by Harish Kalyan, which people might not lend an ear to." Sify gave 2 out of 5 and wrote "Ispade Rajavum Idhaya Raniyum will be liked by fans who enjoyed films like Kaatru Veliyidai and Neethane En Ponvasantham, where the two lovers are a confused pair." The Indian Express gave 1.5 out of 5 stars "Though Ispade Rajavum Idhaya Raniyum tries to explore how men behave in relationships when they come from a broken family, it justifies the violent behaviour of the protagonist." Srinivasan Ramanujam of The Hindu reviewed it as "A film that’s just as confused and complicated as the love story it portrays." Baradwaj Rangan of Film Companion gave 1.5 out of 5 and wrote "The film takes a misconceived stab at self-awareness, with a conversation about stalking that’s not just badly written but not exactly relevant either, given this particular sequence of events. Imagine the irony. The one time Tamil cinema actually acknowledges this subject, it’s out of context."

In contrast, The Times of India gave 3 out of 5 to the film stating "The film has the required elements to attract youngsters though the screenplay becomes a little stretched in the latter half." Behindwoods gave the film 2.75 out of 5 stating "Mature handling of the an [sic] edgy script makes 'Ispade Rajavum Idhaya Raniyum' a worthy watch." Indiaglitz gave 2.75 out of 5 and stated "Go for IRIR for the ernest performances and a fairly engaging screenplay with a relevant message." The New Indian Express gave 2.5 out of 5 and stated "This film can also be seen as a take-down of the superficial romances we get, in which the sun shines bright and rainbows flash forever." Moviecrow gave 2.5 out of 5 and stated "Ranjit Jeyakodi's 'Ispade Rajavum Idhaya Raniyum' is a two hour long, self-obsessed rant of director's take on love and relationships. The standout from the film is Harish Kalyan's hard-hitting performance and the technical brilliance from the cinematographer, editor and music director."
