= Arulvaan =

- Theatrical release poster
- Directed by: Ganesh Vinayakan
- Written by: Ganesh Vinayakan
- Dialogue by: Yugabharathi
- Produced by: S. G. Saravanan
- Starring: Arulnithi; Arav; Ramya Pandian; Krithika
- Cinematography: M. Sukumar
- Edited by: Lawrence Kishore
- Music by: G. V. Prakash Kumar
- Production company: 90 Pictures Production
- Distributed by: Sakthi Film Factory
- Release date: 17 July 2026
- Running time: 109 minutes
- Country: India
- Language: Tamil

Arulvaan (transl. He will bestow grace) is a 2026 Indian Tamil-language drama film written and directed by Ganesh Vinayakan. The film stars Arulnithi, Arav, Ramya Pandian and Krithika. Set in the 1990s, it follows a tribal girl's struggles to receive education, and the efforts of the district collector to help her. The film was released on 17 July 2026.

== Plot ==
In the 1990s, Kurinji, a girl from a tribe with no access to education that suffers endless oppression by the powerful, seeks to be educated and Muthuvel, the district collector, promises to help her on the same.

== Cast ==
- Arulnithi as Muthuvel
- Arav as Kandhan
- Ramya Pandian as Amaravalli
- Krithika as Kurinji
- Kaali Venkat as a reporter
- VTV Ganesh as a government employee
- John Vijay as Pandian
- Five Star Krishna as Anbu
- Aruldoss as the village chief
- Namo Narayana as MLA Ravichandran
- Vinodhini Vaidyanathan as a teacher

== Production ==
In mid-January 2026, it was announced that actor Arulnithi had joined his 2013 film Thagaraaru's director Ganesh Vinakayan for a film titled Arulvaan, which was already near the end of filming. Filming however wrapped only that April. Ganesh stated that producer S. G. Saravanan saw his directorial Thaen (2021) and decided to collaborate with him on a new film, which was initially titled Vaan but later renamed Arulvaan. Arulnithi stated that his character, a district collector, was inspired by an actual bureaucrat who was active in the 1950s, named Malaiyappan. He stated that he accepted to work on the film as long as Arav's role was not de-emphasised in favour of his own. Arav, who had been doing mainly urban roles, played a rural character and learned the Kadar dialect for his role. Ramya Pandian, who had largely been avoiding films with rural settings, agreed to act in this film as she was impressed with the story concept. Child actor Krithika was cast after Ganesh saw her in a television serial. The film was prominently shot in Kurangani and Kodaikanal. The dialogues were written by Yugabharathi, cinematography was handled by M. Sukumar, editing by Lawrence Kishore and art direction by Lalgudi Ilayaraja.

== Soundtrack ==
The soundtrack was composed by G. V. Prakash Kumar. Two songs, "Allipoove" and "Vel Sevvel" were released as singles before the full album.

Track listing
No.	Title	Lyrics	Singer(s)	Length
1.	"Allipoove"	Yugabharathi	G. V. Prakash Kumar	3:59
2.	"Vel Sevvel"	S. Gnanakaravel	Madhubala Krishnan, Ashwin Sathya	6:20
3.	"En Kanne Unpola" (male)	Yugabharathi	Kapil Kapilan	4:46
4.	"En Kanne Unpola" (female)	Yugabharathi	Saindhavi	4:46
5.	"En Kanne Vannappoove"	Yugabharathi	Kapil Kapilan	5:41
6.	"Chandira Suriyan"	Yugabharathi	Vaikom Vijayalakshmi, Sindhuri Vishal, Harshini Nethra	3:48
Total length:				29:20

== Release ==
Arulvaan was theatrically released on 17 July 2026. Prior to this, a preview show was held for tribal communities hailing from the Anamalai Tiger Reserve. The film was distributed by Sakthi Film Factory in Tamil Nadu. It received a U/A certificate (parental guidance) from the Central Board of Film Certification without any cuts. The film began streaming on Amazon Prime Video from 4 September 2026.

=== Reception ===
Prashanth Vallavan of Cinema Express rated the film 1.5/5 stars, writing that though the director "hopes that you would be moved enough by the very real issue shown, the making ends up being shoddy". He said the film "doesn't even work as a competent PSA", felt Arulnithi was "largely confused-looking" and called Krithika the "standout performer" but criticised Arav's "wooden" performance which was "devoid of any understanding of his character's interiority". Abhinav Subramanian of The Times of India rated the film 3/5 and wrote, "Set in an era before the internet reached everyone, when ignorance was easiest to exploit, the film's argument for education holds just as firmly today. Arulvaan is a message film first and a movie second, and it never hides the order of its priorities". Manivasagam Namasivayam of DT Next appreciated the director for narrating the story with "remarkable sensitivity and authenticity" and Sukumar's cinematography. He concluded, "Anchored by strong performances and beautiful visuals, it is a film that reminds us that education remains the most powerful tool for change".

Cinema Vikatan commended the performances of Krithika and Pandian, especially the former's attempt at the Kadar dialect, but felt Arav was impressive only in fight scenes, John Vijay's performance was artificial and Arulnithi holds the entire film together. The critic was also felt the cinematography and editing could have been somewhat better. Nakkheeran lauded the performances of Arulnithi and Krithika, along with the cinematography and background score but felt Pandian was underutilised, the pacing in the second half was slow and the songs were only okay. Dinakaran lauded virtually every aspect of the film from cast performances to the cinematography and editing. Rakesh Thara of ABP Nadu too appreciated these aspects but felt the film's first half was slow-paced and some scenes were predictable. Sennimalai C. B. Senthilkumar of Kalki Online appreciated the story, majority of cast performances, cinematography and music but criticised John Vijay's performance and noted there were some logical mistakes. Virakesari rated the film 2/5, and despite praising Krithika's performance, the cinematography and music, felt it was more like a documentary or propaganda film.

=== Box office ===
Arulvaan collected ₹65 lakh (US$67,000) in the first two days of release. Within the first five days of release it grossed ₹1.5 crore (US$160,000) worldwide. By the end of July it was considered an underperformer by trade analysts.
