= Harish Kalyan =

Indian actor (born 1990)

- Born: 29 June 1990 (age 36); Trichy, Tamil Nadu, India
- Education: Balalok Matriculation School, Chennai; Annamalai University, Chidambaram
- Occupations: Actor; playback singer
- Years active: 2010–present
- Spouse: Narmada (m. 2022)
- Children: 1

Harish Kalyan (born 29 June 1990) is an Indian actor who primarily works in Tamil cinema. He made his acting debut in 2010 with the film Sindhu Samaveli and gained recognition for his roles in Poriyaalan (2014), Vil Ambu (2016), Pyaar Prema Kaadhal (2018), Parking (2023) and Lubber Pandhu (2024). He has won the Edison Awards three times.

== Film career ==
=== Career beginnings (2010–2017) ===
Harish Kalyan made his debut in Samy's Sindhu Samaveli (2010). The film met with contrasting reviews. Critics described his next role in the Thaman-musical Aridhu Aridhu (2010) as "okay", but the film also failed to take a strong opening at the box office. Harish then went on to work in S. A. Chandrasekhar's Sattapadi Kutram (2011). The film opened to poor reviews and did poorly at the box office. He was next seen alongside Karunas, Shweta Basu Prasad and Sanjana Singh in the 2013 comedy film Chandhamama, before playing a supporting role in the Telugu film, Jai Sriram (2013). During the period, he also worked on a bilingual film titled Guest opposite Poonam Kaur, but the film did not have a theatrical release.

After half a dozen films, he was noticed for his performance in the thriller Poriyaalan (2014), where he portrayed a young civil engineer aspiring to become a property developer caught up in a real estate scam. Poriyaalan became Harish's first successful venture with critics praising his performance. The success of Poriyaalan prompted film maker Suseenthiran to select Harish to portray a leading role in his production, Vil Ambu (2016). Appearing in an ensemble cast including his own father Kalyan, Sri and Chandini Tamilarasan, critics praised Harish's performance stating he "scores big time" and "is bound to be noticed for his charming looks and clean features". Despite winning positive reviews, the film did middling business at the box office. In 2017, Harish appeared in another Telugu film, the romantic comedy Kaadhali, where he featured alongside Sai Ronak and Pooja Doshi. A critic praised his performance saying that he "plays his part with maturity". In 2017, Harish took part in the first season of the Tamil reality television show, Bigg Boss hosted by Kamal Haasan. He entered the show on day 53 as a new contestant and finished as the show's second runner up.

=== Breakthrough (2018–present) ===
Following his successful appearance on the show, Harish Kalyan was signed on to play the lead role in Elan's romantic comedy Pyaar Prema Kaadhal (2018), which featured him opposite fellow Bigg Boss contestant Raiza Wilson. Portraying Sree Kumar, a naive Chennai-based IT worker, he won positive reviews for his portrayal as the film received critical and commercial acclaim upon release. A critic from the Indian Express wrote Harish Kalyan "comes up with a performance that he can be proud of", while the Deccan Chronicle also praised the lead pair, noting Harish "looks good and plays his boy-next-door character with utmost ease", while "his flair for comedy also comes to the fore".

In 2019, Harish Kalyan starred as a middle-class boy with major anger issues and a troubled childhood in Ispade Rajavum Idhaya Raniyum directed by Ranjit Jayakodi. Critic from The Times of India found that "Harish Kalyan excels as the aggressive and possessive youngster, a character which is quite contrasting to the one he essayed in Pyaar Prema Kaadhal”. Having played the boy next door in his earlier films, Kalyan had to step out of his comfort zone to prepare for Gautham's role. Besides gaining weight, he grew a beard for his rugged look. The film received both critical acclaim and wide audience response. His film Dhanusu Raasi Neyargale (2019) with Sanjay Bharathi, son of director Santhana Bharathi, was a comedy-drama with a lead male character who is highly superstitious. He played the role of a staunch believer in josiyam and jadhagam. Harish won positive critical acclaim for his performance as Prabhu Govind in the movie Dharala Prabhu (2020), which is the Tamil adapted version of 2012 Hindi film Vicky donor. Directed by the debutant Krishna Marimuthu, the film opened to positive reviews. He was also roped in to play one of the lead in Chimbu Deven's interesting entertainer titled Kasada Thapara (2021) which is produced by Venkat Prabhu's Black Ticket Company. Besides, Harish played the lead role in Oh Manapenne (2021), the Tamil remake of the 2016 Telugu film Pelli Choopulu. He also played the lead in the movie Let’s Get Married, produced by M.S.Dhoni owned Dhoni Entertainment, which released to negative reviews.

== Other work ==
Harish Kalyan learned Hindustani music and can also play the keyboard. During January 2012, he announced his intentions of releasing two songs he had worked on titled "Kutty Peg – A Toast to Life" and "Ovvoru Manushanuukum Ovvoru Feelings". In 2016, Harish released an independent song titled "I'm Single", working as a singer and lyricist for the song, which had music composed by L. V. Muthukumarasamy.

== Personal life ==
His father, Five Star Kalyan, is a film distributor and music label owner. He portrayed Harish Kalyan's father in Vil Ambu (2016). In October 2022, Harish Kalyan married Narmada Udayakumar. They have a daughter born on 2 March 2026.

== Filmography ==
Key
†	Denotes films that have not yet been released

- All films are in Tamil-language, unless otherwise noted.

Year	Film	Role	Notes	Ref
2010	Sindhu Samaveli	Anbu		
2010	Aridhu Aridhu	Son		
2011	Sattapadi Kutram	Surya		
2013	Chandhamama	Yuvan		
2013	Jai Sreeram	Siddharth "Sidhu"	Telugu film	
2014	Poriyaalan	Saravanan		
2016	Vil Ambu	Arul		
2017	Kaadhali	Karthikeyan	Telugu film	
2018	Pyaar Prema Kaadhal	Sree Kumar		
2019	Ispade Rajavum Idhaya Raniyum	Gautham		
2019	Jersey	Adult Nani	Telugu film; cameo appearance	
2019	Dhanusu Raasi Neyargale	Arjun		
2020	Dharala Prabhu	Prabhu Govind		
2021	Kasada Tabara	Krishna Moorthy	Anthology film; segment: Pandhayam	
2021	Oh Manapenne!	Karthick		
2023	Let's Get Married	Gautham		
2023	Parking	Eshwar		
2024	Lubber Pandhu	Anbu		
2025	Diesel	Vasudevan "Vasu"		
2026	Nooru Kodi Vaanavil	Vino		
2026	Dashamakan		Completed	

=== Television ===
Year	Work	Role	Network	Notes	Ref.
2017	Bigg Boss (Tamil season 1)	Contestant	Star Vijay	2nd Runner-Up	
2018	Bigg Boss (Tamil Season 2)	Guest	Star Vijay	Pyaar Prema Kaadhal movie promotion	
2023	Sa Re Ga Ma Pa Tamil Li'l Champs (season 3)	Guest	Zee Tamil	Guest	
2023	Bigg Boss (Tamil season 7)	Guest	Star Vijay	Parking movie promotion	

== Discography ==
Year	Song	Film/Album	Co-singers	Composer	Ref.
2019	"Yei Kadavulae"	Ispade Rajavum Idhaya Raniyum	Vijay Sethupathi	Sam CS	
2016	"I'm Single"	I'm Single	L.V. Muthukumarasamy	L.V. Muthukumarasamy	

== Awards and honours ==
Year	Award	Category	Film/Work	Result	Ref.
2019	Edison Awards	Romantic Hero of the Year	Pyaar Prema Kaadhal	Won	
2021	Edison Awards	Favorite Hero of The Year	Oh Mannapenne!	Won	
2022	Edison Awards	Best Anti Hero Role	Kasada Thapara	Won	
