= Diesel (2025 film) =

2025 Indian film by Shanmugam Muthusamy

- Theatrical release poster
- Directed by: Shanmugam Muthusamy
- Written by: Shanmugam Muthusamy
- Produced by: Devarajulu Markandeyan; SP Sankar; Kishore. S
- Starring: Harish Kalyan; Vinay Rai; Athulya Ravi
- Cinematography: M. S. Prabhu; Richard M. Nathan
- Edited by: San Lokesh
- Music by: Dhibu Ninan Thomas
- Production companies: Third Eye Entertainment; SP Cinemas
- Release date: 17 October 2025
- Running time: 144 minutes
- Country: India
- Language: Tamil

Diesel is a 2025 Indian Tamil-language action thriller film written and directed by Shanmugam Muthusamy in his directorial debut and produced by Third Eye Entertainment and SP Cinemas. The film stars Harish Kalyan, Athulya Ravi and Vinay Rai in the lead roles with Vivek Prasanna as the antagonist with an ensemble cast consisting of P. Sai Kumar, Ananya, Karunas, Ramesh Thilak, Kaali Venkat, Sachin Khedekar, Zakir Hussain, Thangadurai, and KPY Dheena in pivotal roles.

The film was officially announced in December 2021. Principal photography commenced later the same month and wrapped in November 2023. The music was composed by Dhibu Ninan Thomas, with cinematography handled by M. S. Prabhu and Richard M. Nathan; and editing by San Lokesh. Diesel was theatrically released on 17 October 2025, coinciding with Diwali.

== Plot ==
In 1979, a 17 kilometres (11 mi) pipeline was installed to transport crude oil, crossing 40 villages and connecting Chennai Harbour and Ennore, with the OPC crude oil storage unit. The natives resisted, fearing it would harm their livelihoods and held protests, but the government used its authority by killing two organizers, effectively ending the protests. Manoharan, one of the organizers, secretly tapped the pipeline and began illicitly smuggling crude oil, using the money to benefit the community without revealing his identity. In 2012, Manoharan's adopted son, Vasudevan "Diesel Vasu", a chemical engineer, expanded the illicit trade by transporting it to Pathaan's Mumbai refinery, with bribed government officials turning a blind eye. The refined petrol and diesel were then mixed with the legal supply and distributed in Chennai. Vasu further expanded the operation by disguising white petrol as ice cubes to evade police detection and channelled the money for welfare activities through his friend, Sedrayan "Jettu".

DCP Mayavel, a ruthless officer, takes bribes from Manoharan but often clashes with Vasu. Balamurugan, with Mayavel's backing, starts stealing from lorries by bribing drivers, adulterating fuel with coloured water. The adulterated petrol damages vehicle engines, prompting police to investigate the supplying pumps. Vasu discovers Balamurugan's involvement and warns lorry owners. Balamurugan retaliates, using political influence to send a councillor to threaten Vasu, but Vasu resists. A meeting is arranged between Manoharan, Mayavel, Balamurugan, and oil syndicate members. Mayavel threatens to halt Manoharan's dealings unless Balamurugan's business is allowed, challenging anyone to stop Balamurugan from tapping crude oil like Manoharan. Manoharan's oil tankers are confiscated, angering Vasu, who steals Mayavel's jeep to threaten him, despite Manoharan's warnings to stay calm. Mayavel faces heat from superiors and, enraged, attacks Vasu, but Vasu retaliates, severely injuring Mayavel.

Police hunt Vasu, and Manoharan sends Vasu to the custody of his friend Pottu Sekar, but Sekar's wife Kayal opposes sheltering Vasu. Vasu and his friend Murthy hide in a mid-ocean boat. Malar, a law student, tests her dream of a mermaid saving her by going into the ocean. When her boat stops for repairs, she falls in, and Vasu rescues her. She learns about Vasu's biological parents, Dillibabu and Neelam, and is surprised when Neelam appears as a mermaid in her dreams. Vasu reveals his past. Dillibabu is Manoharan's best friend who later adopted Vasu after police killed Dillibabu during crude oil smuggling caused by Balamurugan's father. Neelam died due to a tsunami while thinking about her husband. Malar confesses her love for Vasu. Mayavel recovers and starts his killing spree, humiliating and arresting Manoharan and sealing his petrol pump. Vasu remains unaware in the ocean, while Balamurugan clears Vasu's slum settlements and takes control of the oil syndicate, bribing and threatening members. Following Jettu's warning about the police, Vasu moves to Kakinada Port after sending Malar and friends back to land. Balamurugan brutally kills Jettu and excessively taps around 2 crore litres of oil, prompting a probe under Rudraksh Bhatia, Chief Secretary. Mayavel exploits fishermen's hatred towards Manoharan, learning Vasu's whereabouts, but Vasu and Murthy narrowly escape Mayavel's check and reach Chennai.

Vasu learns of Jettu's death and that they unknowingly travelled with his corpse the previous night. He also discovers Manoharan's arrest and Pathaan as the mastermind behind it. Earlier, Pathaan had stated that by bribing the government, he had kept the pipeline open, aiming to build a private Chennai port, planning to vacate the 5,000-acre area occupied by slum residents. Manoharan severs his ties with Pathaan. The former had asked not to disclose his arrest to Vasu, fearing for his safety if he returns to Chennai. Manoharan's lawyer Namachivayam refuses help, angered by Malar's love for Vasu. Sekar motivates Vasu to find the missing 2 crore litres of crude oil to expose Pathaan's misdeeds. Bhatia and his team begin their probe, while Vasu apprehends corrupt oil transport in-charge Moorthy. Vasu learns Pathaan's plan: moving into battery technology, using surplus lithium from Jammu and Kashmir, aiming to lead global battery manufacturing. Since Pathaan needs a harbour for business, he looted crude oil, secretly hoarding it to make people switch to his batteries.

Malar secures Lawyer Srinivasan to bail Manoharan out. Vasu thwarts Mayavel's plans to murder Manoharan in court after receiving information from Malar. Mayavel humiliates Balamurugan in front of Mahi after learning about his side deal with Pathaan. Vasu deduces that the stolen crude oil is stored in an unused nearby water pipeline and shares this with the slum people. The slum people gain trust in Vasu, realising his past welfare funding through Jettu. Vasu makes the slum women protest for water supply through the idle pipeline by blocking the highways, and makes the slum men block ship entries into Chennai harbour with their boats. Vasu offers Bhatia to retrieve the crude oil and begins to reveal Balamurugan's oil-smuggling activities. Fuel scarcity increases, causing concerns, inflation, and halting daily activities. Pathaan contacts the Union Home Minister to stop the fishermen's protests, and the Union Minister orders Bhatia to halt the probe. Angered, he demands that Vasu reveal the oil's location. In return, Vasu demands Manoharan's release and the removal of the crude oil pipeline.

Bhatia has Vasu share his demands with the media, showing a viral video highlighting the slum's miseries because of the pipeline and effluents. The video sparks public outrage, temporarily suspending Pathaan's private harbour project and triggering inspections at his refinery. Meanwhile, Manoharan is bailed out, and the Chief Minister orders negotiation talks with the protesting slum women. Manoharan's aide to Mahi's toddler reaching the hospital prompts Mahi to rebuke Mayavel's revenge mode. Realizing Balamurugan's manipulation, Mayavel orders him to release the hoarded crude oil, but Pathaan refuses, ordering the control or destruction of the oil and protesters. Vasu has already secretly transferred it through barrels with Bhoominathan's help, moving it to fishermen's boats in the harbour. Police attack the protesting women, and goons target Manoharan simultaneously. Mayavel and Vasu intervene, stopping the brutality, but Bhoominathan is killed in the shootout. Manoharan is killed by Balamurugan, avenging his father, whom Manoharan killed.

Enraged by the missing crude oil, Balamurugan orders Vasu's death. Pathaan's oil industries are permanently shut down for illicit hoarding, and his harbour is temporarily banned. Vasu is sentenced to two years in prison for illicit trade and released. The court orders the OPC oil plant and pipeline's permanent removal, restoring slum and fishing activities after 40 years. The film ends with Vasu revealing he killed Balamurugan and his men before serving his prison term, avenging Manoharan's death.

== Cast ==
- Harish Kalyan as Vasudevan "Vasu"
- Vinay Rai as DCP Mayavel
- Athulya Ravi as Malar (Voice dubbed by Raveena Ravi)
- P. Sai Kumar as Manoharan
- Karunas as Pottu Sekar
- Vivek Prasanna as Balamurugan
- Rishi Rithvik as Dillibabu, Manoharan's best friend and Vasu's father
- Sachin Khedekar as Pathaan
- Zakir Hussain as Rudraksh Bhatia, Chief Secretary, OPC Limited
- Ramesh Thilak as Sedrayan "Jettu"
- KPY Dheena as Murthy
- Thangadurai as Thimingalam
- Lollu Sabha Maaran as an Advocate Srinivasan
- G. Marimuthu as Advocate Namachivayam, Malar's father
- Subramaniam Siva as a Councillor
- Kaali Venkat as Bhoominathan, Dillibabu's friend
- Prem Kumar as Abdulla, police officer
- Ananya as Mahi, Mayavel's wife
- Surekha Vani as Malar's mother
- Nassar as Chief Minister of Tamil Nadu
- Viji Chandrasekhar as Enquiry Officer
- Stunt Silva as Jagan Reddy
- Bose Venkat as Thirumalai, Tamil Nadu state minister
- Subbu Panchu as Tamilarasan IAS
- Thirumurugan as Sivaputhran
- Aruldoss as Tamil Nadu State Minister
- Vinod Sagar as Manoharan's employee
- Ravi Venkatraman as Moorthy, OPC oil transport in charge
- Mathew Varghese as Enquiry Officer
- Ajith Koshy as Nedumaran, police officer
- George Vijay Nelson as George, OPC plant officer
- Pichaikaaran Moorthy as Vasu's relative
- Munnar Ramesh as Vasu's relative
- Saravana Sakthi as Petrol Pump Owner
- Apoorva Singh as Neelam, Vasu's mother
- Subatra Robert as Kayal, Pottu Sekar's wife
- Saranya Ravichandran as Jettu's wife
- Gopi Kannadasan as Navy Officer
- Kumar Natarajan as Union Minister
- Suma as Union Home Minister
- L. Devadharshan
- Satheeshan Kanjikuzhi
- Vetrimaaran as the narrator

== Production ==
=== Development ===
In December 2021, Harish Kalyan who was last seen in Oh Manapenne! (2021) was announced to collaborate with Shanmugam Muthusamy for his next film titled pairing with Athulya Ravi as the lead actress. The film was produced by Devarajulu Markandeyan, SP Sankar, Kishore. S under his Third Eye Entertainment and SP Cinemas, while the technical team consists of cinematographers Richard M. Nathan and M. S. Prabhu, editor San Lokesh and action choreographers Stunt Silva and Rajasekhar. A first look revealing the title as Diesel was unveiled in June 2022.

=== Filming ===
Principal photography began in December 2021 and took place in locations like Chennai and Hyderabad. By mid-2022, the filming was ongoing in Pondicherry. In an interview, Athulya mentioned that the filming took place in Cuddalore for around 10 days. By mid-November 2022, it was reported that the filming was nearing completion. The pre-climax sequence showcasing a protest was shot with around 500 junior artists. The entire filming wrapped in mid-November 2023.

== Music ==
Diesel

Soundtrack album by Dhibu Ninan Thomas
- Genre: Feature film soundtrack
- Language: Tamil
- Label: Think Music
- Producer: Dhibu Ninan Thomas

Dhibu Ninan Thomas chronology
| Ajayante Randam Moshanam (2024) | Diesel (2025) | Mr. X (2026) |

Singles from Diesel
- 1. "Beer Song" Released: 10 February 2023; 2. "Dillubaru Aaja" Released: 18 February 2025; 3. "Aaruyire" Released: 3 October 2025

The film has music composed by Dhibu Ninan Thomas. The first single titled "Beer Song" was released on 10 February 2023 to become an instant hit for its orchestration, lyrics and choreography. The second single titled "Dillubaru Aaja" sung by Silambarasan and Shweta Mohan was released on 18 February 2025. The third single titled "Aaruyire" was released on 3 October 2025.

Track listing
| No. | Title | Lyrics | Singer(s) | Length |
|---|---|---|---|---|
| 1. | "Aaruyire" | Mohan Rajan | Ravi G | 02:08 |
| 2. | "Dillubaru Aaja" | Rokesh & GKB | Silambarasan & Shweta Mohan | 04:38 |
| 3. | "King Diesel" | Mohan Rajan & Amogh Balaji | Arivu & Amogh Balaji | 03:02 |
| 4. | "Beer Song" | Rokesh | Gana Guna | 03:16 |
| 5. | "Aaruyire" (reprise) | Mohan Rajan | Harish Kalyan | 02:08 |
| Total length: | | | | 15:12 |

== Release ==
=== Theatrical ===
Diesel was theatrically released on 17 October 2025, coinciding with Diwali, clashing with Bison Kaalamaadan and Dude. Apart from the original Tamil version, dubbed versions in Telugu and Hindi were planned.

=== Home media ===
The film began streaming on Amazon Prime Video and SimplySouth from 21 November 2025.

== Reception ==
=== Critical response ===
Abhinav Subramanian of The Times of India gave 2.5/5 stars and wrote "Except nothing ever catches fire. The film plods through its conflicts with a flatness that simply goes through the motions. [...] Harish Kalyan has the looks and the chops that help with screen presence. He's lively and really carries the movie. Vinay Rai plays a steely antagonist, and Karunas lends good support." Akshay Kumar of Cinema Express gave 2.5/5 stars and wrote "Diesel is a movie that requires caution regarding its expectations, and it succeeds in parts. The genuine efforts to showcase the struggles in fishermen's livelihood and their living are also worth plaudits. But the poor writing choices create a disconnect between commercial appeal and the story's needs." Janani K of India Today gave 1.5/5 stars and wrote "'Diesel' squanders a potentially explosive premise about fishing communities and crude oil theft by drowning it in borrowed ideas, shoddy execution, and technical incompetence."

Anusha Sundar of OTTPlay gave 1.5/5 stars and wrote "Diesel unfortunately becomes a disappointing watch. With too many elements, and deviations in form of unwanted romance and comedy, the focus for Diesel is lost in translation." Bhuvanesh Chandar of The Hindu wrote "Diesel is a forgettable outing for Harish Kalyan, but you can't help but appreciate the actor for the effort he puts in this all-new space. [...] However, this engine needed more ignition and less imitation of a formula, and perhaps a convincing re-draft and some trust in the audience could have made Harish's efforts worthwhile." Prathyush Parasuraman of The Hollywood Reporter India wrote, "What really troubled me was despite the apparent years swallowed by this film's production, it has this fractured texture, where action and reaction feel divorced, as though they do not belong to the same motion. As though the lips and words do not belong to the same dialogue".

=== Box office ===
In India, Diesel was released alongside Dude and Bison Kaalamaadan. It opened to ₹40 lakh (US$42,000) domestically, the lowest among the releases.
