= Arav =

Indian actor

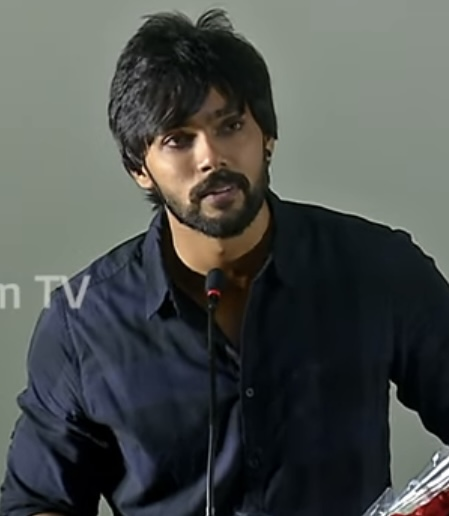
- Born: Nafeez Kizar; Nagercoil, Tamil Nadu, India
- Occupation: Actor
- Years active: 2014–present
- Spouse: Raahei (m. 2020)
- Children: 2

Arav (/ɑːrəv/ born as Nafeez Kizar) is an Indian actor and model who works in the Tamil film industry. After making his acting debut through the Vijay Antony-starrer Saithan (2016), he became known after winning the first season of the Tamil reality television show Bigg Boss hosted by Kamal Haasan.

== Career ==
Arav was born in Nagercoil in southern Tamil Nadu as Nafeez Kizar on 31 October 1990. His father worked as a professor at Trichy Government Law College, which prompted the family to shift to Trichy, where Arav spent his formative years. He did his schooling in Trichy at Kamala Niketan Montessori School before moving to Chennai to pursue a bachelor's degree in Mechanical Engineering from Hindustan University.

At the start of his career, Arav portrayed minor background characters in films, notably being seen in Mani Ratnam's O Kadhal Kanmani (2015) as a colleague of Dulquer Salmaan's character. Arav then portrayed his first major role in Pradeep Krishnamoorthy's psychological thriller, Saithan (2016), portraying a negative supporting role alongside Vijay Antony. He will next be seen portraying the leading role of a police officer in the horror film Meendum Vaa Arugil Vaa (2017).

In 2017, Arav appeared as a contestant on the television show Bigg Boss hosted by Kamal Haasan. After entering the house on the first day of the show, he survived eviction for hundred days and finished as the first season's winner. The success of his appearance on the show, prompted several filmmakers to approach him to play lead roles in their films. He first signed a project with director Saravanan, while he also has a film with director Maran, where he portrays a police officer and features opposite actress Samyukta Hornad. A further project is the feature-length adaptation of Manikandan's short film – Meendum Oru Punnagai, which is being directed by Sameer Bharat Ram. Another film in production is Brain, directed by Vijay Sri.

== Personal life ==
Arav married actress Raahei in September 2020. They have a son, born in November 2021, and a daughter born in October 2023.

== Filmography ==
| Year | Film | Role | Notes |
|---|---|---|---|
| 2015 | O Kadhal Kanmani | Adhi's co worker | Uncredited |
| 2016 | Saithan | Nataraj | |
| 2019 | Market Raja MBBS | Market Raja | |
| 2022 | Kalaga Thalaivan | Arjun | |
| 2023 | Maruthi Nagar Police Station | Nedunchezhiyan | |
| 2025 | Rajabheema | Raja | |
| 2025 | Vidaamuyarchi | Michael | |
| 2026 | Arulvaan | Kandhan | |

=== Short films ===
- Oru Cup Coffee (2015)

=== Television ===
- Bigg Boss Tamil Season 1 (2017) as Contestant/Winner
- Bigg Boss Tamil Season 2 (2018) (Guest From Day 88 to 89)
- BB Jodigal Guest - Grand Launch

| Preceded by Show created | Bigg Boss Tamil Winner (Series 1) 2017 | Succeeded by Riythvika |
