= Ranjit Jeyakodi =

Indian film director

- Born: Theni, Tamil Nadu, India
- Occupation: Film director
- Years active: 2017-present

Ranjit Jeyakodi is an Indian film director, who has directed Tamil and Telugu language films. He rose to fame through the thriller drama Puriyatha Puthir (2017), and has gone on to make feature films including the romantic drama Ispade Rajavum Idhaya Raniyum (2019) and the Telugu action drama Michael (2023).

== Career ==
Ranjit had learned filmmaking during his time studying for the Visual Communications degree at Loyola College, Chennai and later went on to become an associate of director Ram. Ranjit made his directorial debut through Puriyatha Puthir (2017), a thriller film starring Vijay Sethupathi and Gayathrie in the lead roles. The shoot of the film was completed by 2014 under the title of Mellisai, but the production house's financial troubles meant that it eventually had a delayed release three years later.

His second film Ispade Rajavum Idhaya Raniyum (2019) was a romantic drama featuring Harish Kalyan and Shilpa Manjunath in the lead roles. Prior to the film, Ranjit described the film as a "dark love story". A critic noted "it’s impressive that despite being a toxic romance between a broken man and a healing woman, Ranjith’s treatment of how love occurs between them is surprisingly respectable".

Ranjit subsequently worked on the Telugu-language action film Michael (2023) starring Sundeep Kishan in the titular role. The film opened to mixed reviews from critics. Neeshita Nyayapati of The Times of India gave 3 out of 5 stars and wrote "Michael is a genre film that achieves what it sets out to do – tell a dark coming-of-age tale of a young man who knows what it means to be human for better or worse. Watch it if that’s your kind of cinema." Latha Srinivasan of India Today gave 2.5 out of 5 stars and wrote "Michael is a gangster flick that’s more style than story for the most part. Having said that, Sundeep Kishan, Vijay Sethupathi and Sam CS are the absolute highlights of this film."

His next release will be Yaarukkum Anjael, a film starring Bindu Madhavi and Darshana Banik in the lead roles. Production on the film was completed by 2020, though Ranjit's commitments to making Michael delayed its theatrical release.

== Filmography ==
Films

Year	Film	Notes
2017	Puriyatha Puthir	
2019	Ispade Rajavum Idhaya Raniyum	
2023	Michael	Telugu film partially reshot in Tamil
2023	Yaarukkum Anjael	Filming
2026	Untitled Arjun Das Movie	
