= Dost (2001 Tamil film) =

2001 film by S. A. Chandrasekhar

- DVD cover
- Directed by: S. A. Chandrasekaran
- Written by: R. Saminathan (dialogues)
- Screenplay by: S. A. Chandrasekaran
- Story by: S. A. Chandrasekaran
- Produced by: K. Muralidharan; V.Swaminathan; G. Venugopal
- Starring: R. Sarathkumar; Abhirami; Raghuvaran; Prakash Raj
- Cinematography: S. D. Vijay Milton
- Edited by: B. S. Vasu; Saleem
- Music by: Deva
- Production company: Lakshmi Movie Makers
- Release date: 29 June 2001
- Running time: 158 minutes
- Country: India
- Language: Tamil

Dost (/ðoʊsθ/ transl. Friend) is a 2001 Tamil-language action-crime film directed by S. A. Chandrasekaran. The film stars R. Sarathkumar and Abhirami, while Raghuvaran, Prakash Raj and Indu play supporting roles. It was released on 29 June 2001. Dost is an unofficial remake of the 1999 movie Double Jeopardy.

== Plot ==
Vishwa and Raghu are the closest of friends. However, the former is true, while the latter is merely a mercenary. Nothing matters to Raghu except money. He uses his wealthy friend as a ruse to rise in status. Devoted to his selfish friend, Vishwa is too naive to know that Raghu is an archetypal scheming villain who could ruin him for money. When he does realise the truth, it is too late – he is already a wreck, estranged from his child and lover and behind bars. Now it is time for revenge.

Vishva and Ragu are friends and drink alcohol in a boat at night time. During this time Ragu alleges that Visva loves his wife due to which Visva never marries for a 2nd time. Hearing this, Visva gets angry and beats Ragu and both finally sleep but in the morning, Visva cannot see Ragu inside the boat, and only blood stains are seen. Police arrest visva and in court all proof is against visva ending in an imprisonment for 7 years. But visva escapes jail when he gets a phone call from his daughter now under custody of Ragu who was going to shoot her. Viswa traces Ragu to Goa and finally kills Ragu and saves his daughter.

== Cast ==
- R. Sarathkumar as Vishwanathan
- Abhirami as Anamika
- Raghuvaran as Raghu
- Prakash Raj in a dual role as
  - ACP Neelakanda Brahmachari
  - Vishwanathan (disguised face)
- Indhu as Gowri
- Santhana Bharathi as Judge
- Sriman as Dharmaraj
- Nizhalgal Ravi as Jail Superintendent
- Besant Ravi as Police Inspector
- Mohan Sharma as I. G.
- Crazy Mohan as Astrologer
- Mahanadi Shankar as Seller
- Thalapathi Dinesh as Fighter
- Saranya Mohan as a child in cemetery
- Vadivelu as Bomb Bakri (special appearance)
- Kasthuri in a special appearance
- K. S. Ravikumar in a special appearance as boxing referee
- Ramji in a special appearance in "Hey Sal Sal"

== Production ==
S. A. Chandrasekhar had written the film in the late 1990s but shelved the venture as he could not find the correct actor to portray a boxer. After receiving an offer from Lakshmi Movie Makers to direct the film, he reworked the script and cast R. Sarathkumar, alongside Prakash Raj and Raghuvaran. A jail set was built at Murugalaya Studios.

== Soundtrack ==
The music was composed by Deva. The lyrics were written by Vaali.

Song	Singers	Length
"Ethen Thottathu"	Swarnalatha, Arunmozhi	06:40
"Hey Sal Sal"	Sukhwinder Singh	04:58
"I Am A Bachelor"	Anuradha Sriram	06:11
"Rendu Angula Roja"	Baby Vaishali, S. P. Balasubrahmanyam, K. S. Chithra	05:52
"Tajmahal"	Anuradha Sriram, Devan	06:00

== Critical reception ==
Malathi Rangarajan of The Hindu wrote, "The film has flashes of intelligence, splashes of humour, spurts of sentiment and mounds of melodrama. Yet the cocktail does not offer complete satiety. One reason could be the pace, affected as it is by inevitable appendages", and criticised its conspicuous similarities to the American film Double Jeopardy (1999). Visual Dasan of Kalki appreciated Raghuvaran's villainous performance and Vijay Milton's cinematography, but concluded the film was "average".
