= Michael (2023 film) =

- Theatrical release poster
- Directed by: Ranjit Jeyakodi
- Written by: Ranjit Jeyakodi
- Produced by: Bharath Chowdary; Pushkar Ram Mohan Rao
- Starring: Sundeep Kishan; Vijay Sethupathi; Divyansha Kaushik; Gautham Menon; Varun Sandesh
- Cinematography: Kiran Koushik
- Edited by: R. Sathyanarayanan
- Music by: Sam C. S.
- Production companies: Karan C Productions; Sree Venkateswara Cinemas LLP
- Release date: 3 February 2023
- Running time: 155 minutes
- Country: India
- Language: Telugu
- Box office: est. ₹11 crore

Michael is a 2023 Indian Telugu-language neo-noir action thriller film written and directed by Ranjit Jeyakodi, and produced by Karan C Entertainments and Sree Venkateswara Cinemas LLP. The film features Sundeep Kishan, Vijay Sethupathi, Divyansha Kaushik, Gautham Vasudev Menon, and Varun Sandesh in the lead roles. The film was originally shot in Telugu and the climax scenes were reshot in Tamil.

Michael was released on 3 February 2023. The film received mixed reviews from critics, and grossed ₹11 crore (US$1.1 million) at the box office.

== Plot ==
During the 1980s, Michael was a gangster. Gurunath, a Bombay-based crime boss, guides him and his right-hand man, Swamy, raises him. However, Gurunath's son, Amarnath, and his wife, Charulatha, constantly rebuff him. One day, a gang attacks Gurunath, where he learns that his rival Rathan is behind the attack. Gurunath sends Michael to Delhi to kill Rathan and his daughter Theera. However, Michael falls in love with Theera and decides not to kill Rathan. One night, Michael, Theera and Rathan are captured and brought to Amarnath, who reveals that he orchestrated the attack on his father to take over his position and also tells Michael that Theera was earlier pretending to love him, but now she truly loves Michael.

Amarnath kills Rathan and shoots Michael, gravely injuring him. Amarnath's men throw him into the sea, but Michael survives and arrives at Amarnath's hideout. Michael injures and kills almost all of Amarnath's men before killing Amarnath himself. Michael later walks away with Theera and reveals Amarnath's death at his hands to Gurunath, who swears to exact revenge. Charulatha and Gurunath go to Amarnath's hideout to collect his body. Gurunath announces a bounty to kill Michael and Theera in exchange for his position. Michael and Theera are taken in by Kannamma and her husband, a retired police officer, to hide from Gurunath's men. Kannamma's husband calls Gurunath and informs him that Michael and Theera are staying with him. Gurunath sends his men to kill them.

However, upon arrival, Kanamma's husband hoodwinks them, and he and Kannamma finish off Gurunath's men. Kannamma and her husband reveal to Theera that Michael's mother, Jennifer, a singer, was having an affair with Gurunath and was oblivious that he was already married to Charulatha. Jennifer became pregnant with Michael. Charulatha came to know about it, which enraged her. Charulatha tried to kill Jennifer by setting her house on fire, but Jennifer managed to survive and worked as a cook in a prison, raising Michael in the process. Michael learns about his mother's past and purposely gains Gurunath's attention to work for him to kill him at the right time.

Swamy also knew about his past and was helping him all along. Michael heads back to Bombay and confronts Gurunath at his mansion, where he reveals his relation to him and about Amarnath's attempt to take over him. Michael later kills both Charulatha and Gurunath, thus avenging the injustice caused to his mother. Later, Michael reunites with Theera and takes over Gurunath's empire, becoming the new crime boss of Bombay. Later, a new gang led by Gurunath's twin brother kidnap Swamy. Gurunath had kept this a secret from everyone except Charulatha. After learning about Michael, Gurunath's brother swears revenge against him.

== Cast ==
- Sundeep Kishan as Michael
- Vijay Sethupathi as Michael's Godfather
- Divyansha Kaushik as Theera
- Gautham Vasudev Menon in a dual role as
  - Gurunath
  - Jai
- Varun Sandesh as Amarnath, Gurunath and Charulatha's son
- Varalaxmi Sarathkumar as Kannamma, Michael Godfather's wife
- Anasuya Bharadwaj as Charulatha, Gurunath's wife and Amarnath's mother
- Deepshikha as Jennifer, Michael’s mother (special appearance)
- Ayyappa P. Sharma as Swamy
- Raj Tirandasu as Michael's friend
- Master Vasanth Vikas
- Master Bhanu
- Master Lohith
- Anish Kuruvilla as Rathan, Theera's father
- RK Mama
- Ravi Varma as a Police officer

== Music ==
The soundtrack and score of the film were composed by Sam C. S.

No.	Title	Lyrics	Singer(s)	Length
1.	"Nee Vuntey Chaalu"	Kalyan Chakravarthy Tripuraneni	Sid Sriram
2.	"Pammare"	Chandrabose	Mangli
3.	"Poru Poru"	Vamsi Krishna, Ranjit Jeyakodi	Sarath Santhosh
4.	"Guardian Angel"	Sharanya Gopinath	Sharanya Gopinath

== Release ==
The film was released in theatres on 3 February 2023. The digital rights were sold to Aha, while the satellite rights of the Telugu version were sold to Zee Telugu and dubbed Tamil version were sold to Star Vijay. The film was premiered on Aha from 24 February 2023.

The Hindi dubbed version was premiered on Sony Max on 28 May 2023.

== Reception ==
Neeshita Nyayapati of The Times of India gave 3 out of 5 stars and wrote "Michael is a genre film that achieves what it sets out to do – tell a dark coming-of-age tale of a young man who knows what it means to be human for better or worse. Watch it if that’s your kind of cinema." Latha Srinivasan of India Today gave 2.5 out of 5 stars and wrote "Michael is a gangster flick that’s more style than story for the most part. Having said that, Sundeep Kishan, Vijay Sethupathi and Sam CS are the absolute highlights of this film."

Thinkal Menon of OTTplay gave 2.5 out of 5 stars and wrote "Michael is a mish-mash of several home-made gangster films which have entertained in the past. The movie is a wasted opportunity and might appeal to hardcore action lovers who do not mind enjoying old wine in a new bottle."
