= Children of Heaven (1997 film) =

- US release poster
- Directed by: Majid Majidi
- Written by: Majid Majidi
- Produced by: Amir Esfandiari; Mohammad Esfandiari
- Starring: Amir Farrokh Hashemian; Bahare Seddiqi; Mohammad Amir Naji
- Cinematography: Parviz Malekzaade
- Edited by: Hassan Hassandoost
- Music by: Kayvan Jahanshahi
- Production company: Institute for the Intellectual Development of Children and Young Adults
- Distributed by: Miramax Films
- Release date: February 1997 (Fajr)
- Running time: 88 minutes
- Country: Iran
- Language: Persian
- Budget: US$180,000
- Box office: US$1.6 million

Children of Heaven (Persian: بچه‌های آسمان, romanized: Baččehā-ye āsmān) is a 1997 Iranian family drama film written and directed by Majid Majidi. The plot follows a brother and sister, and their adventures over a lost pair of shoes. It received positive reviews, and was nominated for the Academy Award for Best Foreign Language Film in 1998.

== Plot ==
Nine-year-old Ali picks up his six-year-old sister Zahra's repaired shoes from a cobbler. While purchasing potatoes at a grocer's, Ali hides the shoes in a bag next to a vegetable stand outside. A homeless man unknowingly picks up the bag, thinking it is garbage. Frantic, Ali knocks over the stand to search for the shoes, and is chased away by the grocer.

Aware of his family's financial troubles, Ali tells Zahra not to inform their parents about her lost shoes. That night, the pair agree to share Ali's shoes: Zahra will wear them to school in the morning and return them to Ali at midday, so he can wear them to his afternoon classes.

Ali scores the joint-highest on a test, and his teacher awards him a gold-colored pen; he gifts it to Zahra to apologise for losing her shoes. Ali's persistent lateness is noticed by his principal, who orders him to return to school with his father. Ali's teacher, citing his performance, persuades the principal to reconsider.

One day, Zahra notices her missing pink shoes worn by Roya, another student. After class, Zahra follows Roya home and later brings Ali to recover her shoes. Upon seeing Roya's blind father, they leave without further action. To reward her school performance, Roya's father buys her new shoes and throws away Zahra's. Zahra is dismayed when she finds out.

Ali's father, anxious to earn more money, borrows gardening equipment and travels with Ali to wealthier areas in Tehran to find work. He eventually works for Alireza, a six-year-old boy, and his grandfather, who pays Ali's father generously. Later, Ali's father's bicycle's brakes fail, and he is injured and unable to work after falling off the bike.

Ali learns of a regional children's long-distance race; the prize for finishing third is one week at a vacation camp and a pair of sneakers. Ali enters to win new shoes for Zahra but accidentally finishes first. Upon returning home, Ali refuses to tell Zahra where he placed. Ali's father, having repaired his bicycle, buys a pair of white and a pair of pink shoes. In the final shot, Ali, dejected as his sneakers are torn from the race, is shown dipping his bare, blistered feet in a pool.

Alternate versions include an epilogue, revealing that Ali achieves success as a long-distance runner.

== Cast ==
- Amir Farrokh Hashemian as Ali
- Bahare Seddiqi as Zahra
- Reza Naji as Father
- Fereshte Sarabandi as Mother
- Dariush Mokhtari as Ali's teacher
- Nafise Jafar-Mohammadi as Roya
- Mohammed-Hasan Hosseinian as Roya's father
- Mohammed-Hossein Shahidi as Alireza
- Kazem Asqarpoor as Grandfather
- Christopher Maleki as Sugar seller

== Production ==
The film was shot in Tehran. It was attempted to keep the filming secret in order to capture a more realistic image of the city. The production costs have been estimated at US$180,000. The film was distributed by Miramax.

== Release ==
=== Box office ===
Children of Heaven premiered in February 1997 at the Tehran Fajr Film Festival and was awarded several national film awards. It opened in the US on January 22, 1999, and earned a US box office total of $933,933. The worldwide total was $1,628,579.

=== Critical reception ===
Critical response to the film was highly positive. Some critics compared it to Vittorio de Sica's Bicycle Thieves (1948). Roger Ebert's review in the Chicago Sun-Times called it "very nearly a perfect movie for children" that "lacks the cynicism and smart-mouth attitudes of so much American entertainment for kids and glows with a kind of good-hearted purity".

In 1998, it became the first Iranian film to be nominated for an Academy Award for Best Foreign Language Film, losing to the Italian film Life Is Beautiful by Roberto Benigni. The majority of its US earnings came after the nomination was announced. After the film had become well known worldwide due to the Oscar nomination, it was shown in several European, South American, and Asian countries between 1999 and 2001. It was successfully shown in numerous film festivals and won awards at the Fajr Film Festival, the World Film Festival, the Newport International Film Festival, the Warsaw International Film Festival, and the Singapore International Film Festival. It competed for the Grand Prize at the American Film Institute's festival of 1997.

While watching the film, Singaporean filmmaker Jack Neo and his wife were moved to "holding hands and crying after seeing the love shared by the children". Children of Heaven inspired Neo to explore issues faced by Singaporean youths in his 2002 film I Not Stupid.

On the review aggregator website Rotten Tomatoes, 83% of 30 critics' reviews are positive, with an average rating of 7.7/10. Metacritic, which uses a weighted average, assigned the film a score of 77 out of 100, based on 14 critics, indicating "generally favorable" reviews.

=== Home media ===
In the United States, the film was released on VHS in 1999 by Buena Vista Home Entertainment (under the Miramax Home Entertainment banner), with a DVD following on September 3, 2002.

In December 2010, Miramax was sold by The Walt Disney Company, their owners since 1993. That month, the studio was taken over by private equity firm Filmyard Holdings. Filmyard licensed the home media rights for several Miramax titles to Lionsgate, and on January 6, 2012, Lionsgate Home Entertainment reissued Children of Heaven on DVD in the United States. In 2011, Filmyard Holdings licensed the Miramax library to streamer Netflix. This deal included Children of Heaven, and ran for five years, eventually ending on June 1, 2016.

Filmyard Holdings sold Miramax to Qatari company beIN Media Group in March 2016. In April 2020, ViacomCBS (now known as Paramount Skydance) acquired the rights to Miramax's library, after buying a 49% stake in the studio from beIN. Children of Heaven is among the 700 titles they acquired in the deal, and since April 2020, the film has been distributed by Paramount Pictures. On March 4, 2021, Children of Heaven was made available on Paramount's then-new streaming service Paramount+, as one of its inaugural launch titles. Paramount later licensed Children of Heaven to Australian distributor Imprint, who released the film on Blu-ray in the country on March 8, 2024.

=== Television airings ===
In the United Kingdom, the film was watched by 100,000 viewers on ITV in 2008, making it the year's most-watched foreign-language film on ITV. It was later watched by 100,000 UK viewers on ITV in 2009, again making it the year's most-watched foreign-language film on ITV. Combined, the film drew a 200,000 UK viewership on ITV between 2008 and 2009.

== See also ==
- Homerun, a 2003 Singaporean film by Jack Neo, is an adaptation of Children of Heaven, but its theme is friendship and it is set in 1965 Singapore.
- Bumm Bumm Bole, a 2010 Indian Hindi film by Priyadarshan, and starring Darsheel Safary, is inspired by Children of Heaven.
- Akka Kuruvi, a 2022 Indian Tamil film by Samy, is the official remake of Children of Heaven.
- Children of Heaven (2026 film), a 2026 Indonesian film by Hanung Bramantyo, is an adaptation of Children of Heaven.
- List of submissions to the 71st Academy Awards for Best Foreign Language Film
- List of Iranian submissions for the Academy Award for Best Foreign Language Film
