= Sindhu Samaveli =

2010 Tamil independent film

- Poster
- Directed by: Samy
- Written by: Samy
- Produced by: S. Michael Rayappan
- Starring: Harish Kalyan; Amala Paul; Ghajini
- Cinematography: Utpal V. Nayanaar
- Edited by: G. Sasikumar
- Music by: Sundar C. Babu
- Production company: Global Infotainment
- Release date: 3 September 2010
- Country: India
- Language: Tamil

Sindhu Samaveli (transl. Indus Valley) is a 2010 Indian Tamil-language independent erotic thriller film written and directed by Samy. The film stars debutant Harish Kalyan, Amala Paul, and Ghajini. The music was composed by Sundar C Babu. The film became Samy's third controversial film in succession, achieving an "A" (adults only) certificate upon censor following Uyir and Mirugam. Amala Paul, was given the stage name Anaka by Samy, to avoid confusion with another actor named Amala, although she reverted to her original name for subsequent films.

== Plot ==
Anbu (Harish Kalyan) is a brilliant student in a village school in the Kanyakumari area. His mother teaches in the same school, and his father Veerasami (Ghajini) is a CRPF soldier in Assam. His classmate Sundari (Amala Paul), who is older than him by three years, falls for him. One day, Veerasami gets injured in a militant attack and takes voluntary retirement and comes back to the village. Veerasami dotes on his family, especially his son, but tragedy strikes as his wife dies from a snakebite. Both father and son are devastated. Anbu decides to fulfil his mother's dream of becoming a teacher. Around this time, Veerasami and other relatives pressure Anbu into marrying Sundari. The newlyweds are together for hardly a month before they are separated as Anbu has to go to the teachers' training school. Sundari is left in the house to look after her father-in-law.

Veerasami longs for a sexual companion after his wife's death and starts lusting after Sundari. Being in close quarters with Sundari and with Anbu absent, he fantasises about having sex with her. After rescuing her from a fall from a boat, he tries to have sex with the unconscious Sundari. But regaining consciousness soon, she is shocked and covers herself up. Unable to control his urge, he has sex with Sundari on the boat. After this incident, Veerasami tries to kill himself but is stopped by Sundari, stating that she also partook in the act. They ignore the incident and try to live a normal life. Veerasami starts to drink heavily and sleeps outside regularly. One day, Sundari invites him inside and provides food. This time, Sundari, aroused by the previous incident, is the first to seduce Veerasami. After having sex multiple times, the father-in-law and daughter-in-law are now comfortable with the new illicit relationship. They start going out to the movies together. Sundari provides Veerasami with alcohol when he needs it, cooks food, and performs the sexual favours that he needs. In turn, Veerasami buys Sundari kinky clothes and watches her wear them.

One day Anbu returns to learn the bitter truth. He tries to be intimate with Sundari, but she avoids him. The father and son are now vying for the same woman. Sundari becomes heartbroken after reading a magazine article written by Anbu, in which he mentions that he suspects a relationship between Sundari and Veerasami but hopes that Sundari remains faithful to him and that he loves her deeply. She commits suicide by getting run over by a train. After Sundari's death, Anbu gets a feeling of being called under a tree where the word "camera" is written on it. The scene shifts to a boat where Anbu and Veerasami are drinking. The scene shifts back showing Anbu digging out a camera from under the tree where a recording shows Sundari confessing it was all because Veerasami raped her that she lost herself and had illicit relations and she does not have any quality to live with a loving Anbu and thus turns her head to a railway track where a train is running, implying that she killed herself by getting run over by a train.

Enraged by all this, Anbu plans to kill Veerasami. Anbu asks Veerasami why he did not feel wrong while lusting for Sundari, to which he drunkenly replies that Sundari was very beautiful and he feels sad that he shaved his head with Anbu and it was good that his wife died earlier. He also points out that if Sundari cheated on Anbu, then what was the possibility that his wife did not cheat on him while he was serving in the military? Hearing this, Anbu gets enraged and starts stabbing the boat thus creating a hole. Water then starts seeping through that hole into the boat. Anbu, in his mind, tells his father that an animal like him should die and leaves him alone, who gets inebriated. Anbu jumps out of the sinking boat and swims to shore, while the boat with the unconscious Veerasami drifts further into the sea. The boat capsizes and the intoxicated Veerasami drowns and dies.

Anbu then swims to the shore and he goes back to that tree near his house where he believes that his mother's spirit resides in the tree. He promises her that he will be a good teacher and educate a lot of children and also promises to fulfil her wishes. He then leaves the house as the film ends.

== Cast ==
- Harish Kalyan as Anbu
- Amala Paul as Sundari (Credited as Anaka)
- Ghajini as Veerasami
- Fahad Nasar as Anbu's schoolmate
- Ganja Karuppu as the church father

== Soundtrack ==
The soundtrack was composed by Sundar C. Babu.

All lyrics are written by Na. Muthukumar.

Track listing
| No. | Title | Singer(s) | Length |
|---|---|---|---|
| 1. | "Muthathale Sanda" | Naveen, Rita | 4:35 |
| 2. | "Ovoru Manithan" | Karthik | 4:41 |
| 3. | "Thappu Thanda" | Malgudi Subha | 4:40 |
| 4. | "Theme Music" | | 2:36 |
| 5. | "Yaar Inge" (female) | S. Janaki | 4:53 |
| 6. | "Yaar Inge" (male) | S. P. Balasubrahmanyam | 4:52 |
| Total length: | | | 26:17 |

== Reception ==
The Times of India gave the film a rating of two out of five stars and wrote that "You can only be thankful that the film is not crude. Finally, excellent camera work by Utpal V Nayanar. Art work by Thotta Tharani stands out". Rediff wrote that "There might be a few hiccups, but Sindhu Samaveli presents a solid, real issue with all its sharpness and intensity intact. It deserves a watch".

== Controversies ==
Sindhu Samaveli generated controversy because of its theme of an elderly man having an adulterous relationship with his daughter-in-law, and protests were made against the film. Samy's house was attacked by unidentified people, leading to him filing a police complaint.
