= Akka Kuruvi =

2022 Indian film

- Theatrical release poster
- Directed by: Samy
- Screenplay by: Samy
- Based on: Children of Heaven by Majid Majidi
- Produced by: M. Muthukkaruppan; Anitha Saminathan
- Starring: Master Maheen; Baby Davia; Meenakshi Dinesh
- Cinematography: Utpal V Nayanar
- Edited by: Manigandan Sivakumar
- Music by: Ilaiyaraaja
- Production companies: Percept Pictures; Madurai Muthu Movies; Kanavu Thozhirsalai
- Distributed by: PVR Pictures
- Release date: 6 May 2022
- Country: India
- Language: Tamil

Akka Kuruvi (transl. Cuckoo) is a 2022 Indian Tamil-language children's drama film directed by Samy and produced by Madurai Muthu Movies and Kanavu Thozhirsalai. The film stars Master Maheen, Baby Davia and Meenakshi Dinesh (In her Tamil debut) in the lead roles with a cameo appearance from Kathir and Varsha Bollamma. The film's music was composed by Ilaiyaraaja, with cinematography handled by Utpal V Nayanar and editing done by Manigandan Sivakumar. The film is a remake of the 1997 Iranian film Children of Heaven. It was released in theatres on 6 May 2022.

== Plot ==
To not burden their impoverished parents, two siblings decide to share a pair of shoes after the brother loses the sister's. While this turns out to be more difficult than they imagined, fate offers a chance in the form of a marathon.

== Cast ==
- Master Maheen as Deva
  - Kathir as older Deva (cameo appearance)
- Baby Davia as Sara
  - Varsha Bollamma as older Sara (cameo appearance)
- Meenakshi Dinesh as Bharathi
- V. S. Kumar as Deva's and Sara's father
- Thara Jagathambi as Deva's and Sara's mother

== Soundtrack ==
The soundtrack and score is composed by Ilaiyaraaja and the album featured three songs. All the songs were written by Ilaiyaraaja himself. The song "Maanguyelum Kizhiyum" is based on "When Johnny Comes Marching Home".

Track listing
No.	Title	Lyrics	Singer(s)	Length
1.	"Maanguyelum Kizhiyum"	Ilaiyaraaja	Ilaiyaraaja, Vibhavari, Aishwarya	4:14
2.	"Munnae Po"	Ilaiyaraaja	Anitha K, Dhivya S, Kavitha I, AS Namratha, C Sowmiya, Devu Treesa Mathew, Rasika V, Vaishnavi	3:52
3.	"Poombarai Vazhbavane"	Ilaiyaraaja	Mukesh, Mahalinga VM, Velmurugan, Sellanguppan Mu Subramany, Anitha K, Chinnaponnu, Magizhini Manimaaran, A Dhanalakshmi	3:43

== Reception ==
M Suganth of The Times of India rated the film with 2/5 stars, stating that, "An underwhelming remake of a beloved Iranian film. The film largely banks on Ilaiyaraaja's background score to make us invested, and the maestro comes up with a suitably Insistent score that keeps nudging us towards the emotions that we are meant to feel. This and the inherent feel-goodness in the story are what keep the film afloat." A critic from News Today said Akka Kuruvi is a film that deserves a good watch. Dinamalar rated the film with 2.75/5 stars. A reviewer from Maalai Malar gave a rating of 5.5 out on 10 and called the film a summer feast. Kirubhakar Purushothaman from Cinema Express noted that "Maybe, there is a third and unintentional use of Akka Kuruvi – the film helps us learn how the same story can be made into a classic or, like this case, an embarrassment" and gave 1 star out of 5 stars. Majid Majidi, director of the Iranian original, expressed appreciation for the remake, saying it did justice to the original and also highlighted Ilaiyaraaja's music.

== See also ==
- Children of Heaven, a 1997 Iranian film.
- Homerun, a 2003 Singapore adaptation of Children of Heaven.
- Bumm Bumm Bole, a 2010 Indian Hindi adaptation of Children of Heaven.
