= Puriyatha Puthir =

2017 Indian film by Ranjit Jeyakodi

- Poster
- Directed by: Ranjit Jeyakodi
- Written by: Ranjit Jeyakodi
- Produced by: Deepan Boopathy; Ratesh Velu
- Starring: Vijay Sethupathi; Gayathrie; Mahima Nambiar
- Cinematography: Dinesh B. Krishnan
- Edited by: Bavan Sreekumar
- Music by: Sam C. S.
- Production company: Rebel Studio
- Distributed by: JSK Film Corporation
- Release date: 1 September 2017
- Running time: 120 minutes
- Country: India
- Language: Tamil

Puriyatha Puthir (transl. Mystifying Puzzle) is a 2017 Indian Tamil-language psychological thriller film directed by Ranjit Jeyakodi in his directorial debut and produced by Deepan Boopathy and Ratesh Velu under, Rebel Studio Productions. Vijay Sethupathi, Gayathrie and Mahima Nambiar feature in the leading roles, while the film's music was composed by Sam C. S., while the cinematography was handled by Dinesh B. Krishnan. The film began production in 2013, but went through production delays and was only released on 1 September 2017. It won three Tamil Nadu State Film Awards: Second Best Film, Best Actor (Sethupathi) and Best Music Director (Sam).

== Plot ==
A woman stands at the top of a building, calls someone from her mobile, apologizes, and then commits suicide by jumping from the building.

A few years later, Kathir, an aspiring music director, and his friends, Vinod and DJ, are in a pub. Vinod and DJ are desperate for hot videos of women, while Kathir preaches to them not to do so, which falls on deaf ears. On his way to his music shop, Kathir sees a girl writing her name "Meera" on the drenched window of a bus, and they smile at each other. A few days later, Kathir is fascinated by a tune he hears from his shop's piano. He finds that Meera played it. Meera orders a red violin to be delivered to her home. Kathir delivers it, and they both become friends. They decide to take their relationship to the next level and become lovers.

Meanwhile, Vinod is sacked from his job when illicit photos of him with his boss's wife go viral on Facebook. Due to the humiliation faced in the office, he hangs himself. Kathir blames DJ for encouraging Vinod and provoking his suicide, to which DJ reacts indifferently.

One day, Kathir receives a photograph of Meera on his cell phone and becomes shocked. He then receives videos of Meera changing her dress in a shop's trial room. Kathir rushes to the shop where she is and fights with the employees. Meera gets irritated by Kathir's behavior and demands an explanation. Kathir tells her about the video, and she gets upset. Despite Kathir's efforts to console her, she attempts to commit suicide, but Kathir manages to save her and admits her to a hospital. Kathir tries to lodge a complaint about the videos at a police station, but the officers' desperation to watch the video makes him back off.

Kathir finds the sender's address through the service provider. He goes to catch the owner, Mithula, but realizes she died five years ago. Meanwhile, Meera is discharged from the hospital and goes with Kathir to his house. DJ tries to find out about Mithula through a laundry person in the area near Mithula's residence. Mithula died by committing suicide due to her father's constant disciplinary torture. DJ shares the information with Kathir and asks him to meet him the next morning. Unfortunately, DJ is arrested the next morning by the Narcotics Bureau for indulging in drug trafficking. Kathir finds out that an anonymous video was shared with the Narcotics Bureau about drug supply activities in a pub. DJ happened to be in one of the videos the sender captured and was arrested.

Kathir gets scared and wants to leave the city, suspecting someone is targeting him. He rushes to his home, but in the middle of the way, he gets a video of Meera bathing naked in her bathroom. Kathir receives a message from the sender, who blackmails him into removing his clothes, putting on a raincoat, and standing on a busy moving bridge for 10 minutes. Kathir does the task, but the raincoat was dipped in red paint. As it starts to rain, the raincoat becomes transparent, resulting in Kathir standing naked on the bridge. The sender then asks how it feels to stand naked in front of the public, and it is the same feeling as when a person's privacy is breached. Kathir is arrested for causing a public nuisance but is then released.

Kathir returns home at night, and Meera demands to know why he is late. After further demands, Kathir yells at her, and she leaves for her own home. However, an anonymous person confronts and kidnaps her. Kathir rushes to Meera's flat and finds her neighbor tying her up. He rescues her and hands the kidnapper over to the police. Kathir feels happy that the problem is solved and spends the night with Meera. The next day, Kathir again gets a video of his intimate time with Meera. He checks the entire room for a camera, but instead finds many photos of Meera with Mithula and a diary in the wardrobe, which he reads.

The film goes into a flashback. A few years ago, Meera and Mithula were best friends in college. During a college music competition, Meera sees Kathir, who studies in the same college as Vinod, DJ, and the girls. Meera gets attracted to Kathir, who performs in the music competition. Meera is desperate to talk to Kathir, but he responds only partially. Mithu pokes fun at Meera's romance and imitates Meera's reaction when Kathir proposes to her while she is on her way to the bathroom in her bathing attire. Meera unintentionally videotapes her imitation as a joke. Kathir, DJ, and Vinod find Meera's cell phone on the table and steal the video. Meera sees Kathir placing the phone back, but thinks he wants her number. Unfortunately, the video goes viral across the college, and the next day, Mithula is sacked by her college. Her father misunderstands that she is having affairs with numerous men and disowns her without hearing her explanation. Meera feels guilty for shooting the video and consoles Mithu to ignore it. However, Mithu commits suicide by jumping from the building terrace and dies, leaving Meera shattered, heartbroken, and mournful.

In the present, Kathir rushes to find Meera and finds her on the terrace, ready to jump. She calls him and tells him that he wants to feel the pain of losing a loved one. It is revealed that she shot the photos and videos of Vinod and DJ; was the reason for their death and arrest, respectively; sent the videos of her changing in the trial room at the clothing store; sent the naked bathing video; and made Kathir go to the moving bridge with the raincoat. She did everything to avenge Mithu's death. Kathir begs her not to make a hasty decision and explains that he had nothing to do with it, but Meera tells him he reacted only when his loved ones faced a problem, but remained quiet when a third person was affected. She tells him that staying silent when a crime is happening is equivalent to committing the crime. Kathir failed to stop DJ and Vinod from violating Mithu's privacy. Kathir realises his mistake and begs for an apology, while confessing his love and feelings to Meera. Meera tells him that she loves him a lot, but both of them have become the reason for Mithu's death, and she cannot live with the guilt. She apologizes to Kathir for all she did to him and commits suicide, leaving Kathir heartbroken as he mourns her death.

== Cast ==
- Vijay Sethupathi as Kathir
- Gayathrie as Meera
- Mahima Nambiar as Mithula (Mithu)
- Arjunan as DJ
- Ranjith as Vinod
- Ramesh Thilak as Meera's kidnapper
- Vanitha Hariharan
- Supergood Subramani
- Sonia Deepti (cameo appearance)

== Production ==
Vijay Sethupathi announced that he signed the film in September 2013 in an interview to The Hindu, under the direction of first-time filmmaker Ranjit Jeyakodi. Since Sethupathi had prior commitments, the film was supposed to take off only a year later. However, as Sanguthevan, a project of Sethupathi was getting delayed, the team chose to begin principal photography immediately, with the director telling that they had no time for pre-production but started filming since he had a cinematographer and a music director ready. Gayathrie was swiftly signed on to play a violin teacher in the film, and to practice for her character she began to learn the instrument part-time. The film was launched on 17 December 2013. After the first schedule which lasted for 26 days, 50 percent of the film had reportedly been completed. Filming was held across Chennai including at Fortis Healthcare, Vadapalani by mid-February. In June 2014, the director informed that "about 10 -12 days of shooting" was remaining. In October 2014, Telugu actress Sonia Deepti also stated that she had a short role in the film.

Following a period of delay, the film was sold to JSK Film Corporation in October 2016 and renamed from Mellisai to Puriyatha Puthir. Regarding the title change, Gayathrie said, "Mellisai, even though we said it was a mystery thriller, the title may not have given the same impact. But [Puriyatha Puthir] does it". The team prepared to launch the film in January 2017 but had to withdraw after financiers contested against debts taken up by Deepan Boopathy for another film, Aakko.

== Soundtrack ==
Mellisai

Soundtrack album by Sam C. S.
- Released: 10 August 2017
- Recorded: 14 October 2015
- Length: 31:40
- Language: Tamil
- Label: Think Music
- Producer: Sam C. S.

Sam C. S. chronology
Vikram Vedha (2017)	Mellisai (2017)	6 Athiyayam (2018)

The film's music soundtrack was composed by Sam C. S., while the audio rights of the film was acquired by Think Music. The original album, titled Mellisai, was released on 14 October 2015 and featured four songs. Shreya Ghoshal won the Vikatan Award of the Best Female Playback Singer for the song "Mazhaikulle".

Track listing
No.	Title	Lyrics	Singer(s)	Length
1.	"Vellai Kanavu"	Ranjit Jeyakodi	Hariharan, Harini	4:46
2.	"Lola (I)"	Madhan Karky	Maria Kavitha Thomas	4:17
3.	"Lola (II)"	Madhan Karky	Andrea Jeremiah	4:09
4.	"Parakkiren Naan"	Madhan Karky	Srinivas, Maria Kavitha Thomas	5:00
5.	"Mazhaikkulle"	Sam C. S.	Haricharan, Shreya Ghoshal	5:10
6.	"Take Me Higher"	Madhan Karky, Ranjit Jeyakodi	Suchith Suresan, JK, Maria Kavitha Thomas	5:01
7.	"Mellisai (Theme)"	Vishnupriya Ravi	Chennai Orchestra	3:17

== Release and reception ==
Puriyatha Puthir opened following several delays on 1 September 2017. A critic from The Hindu noted that "the film begins in a rather unimpressive manner and is out of place in today’s world", while a reviewer from Sify.com wrote "nothing really works in this contrived film mainly due to the unconvincing writing and a heroine who is unimpressive". A reviewer from Behindwoods.com wrote the film "falls short of an engaging puzzle", adding "Ranjit Jeyakodi’s intention to present an intriguing thriller is nice, but the way of conceiving the idea and delivering it on screen could have been more confined and focussed". Likewise, the critic from The Times of India wrote "given that Lens (2017) told us the same thing fairly recently (even though this film was shot a while ago), this ‘message’ doesn't impact us as much as it should". In contrast, The New Indian Express wrote "Vijay Sethupathi shines in this decent thriller" but adds "Puriyatha Puthir could have been so much more and that is disappointing".
