= Oh Manapenne! =

- Official release poster
- Directed by: Kaarthikk Sundar
- Screenplay by: Deepak Sundarrajan; Sanjeev; Kaarthikk Sundar
- Based on: Pelli Choopulu by Tharun Bhascker
- Produced by: Satyanarayana Koneru; Ramesh Varma Penmesta
- Starring: Harish Kalyan; Priya Bhavani Shankar
- Cinematography: Krishnan Vasant
- Edited by: Kripakaran
- Music by: Vishal Chandrashekhar
- Production companies: A Studios LLP; A Havish Production; SP Cinemas; Madhav Media; Third Eye Entertainment
- Distributed by: Disney+ Hotstar
- Release date: 22 October 2021
- Country: India
- Language: Tamil

Oh Manapenne! (pronounced [maɳappeɳɳeː] transl. Oh Dear Bride!) is a 2021 Indian Tamil-language romantic comedy film directed by Kaarthikk Sundar in his directorial debut and written by Deepak Sundarrajan. A remake of the Telugu film Pelli Choopulu (2016), it stars Harish Kalyan and Priya Bhavani Shankar as a girl and boy who meet during a matchmaking event. How their aspirations bring them together forms the rest of the story.

The rights to remake Pelli Choopulu in Tamil were initially acquired by Gautham Vasudev Menon in 2016, and the film titled Pon Ondru Kandein (transl. I saw a girl) was to be directed by Senthil Veerasamy, with Vishnu Vishal and Tamannaah Bhatia starring. The project faced delays and was ultimately shelved due to budgetary constraints; by November 2019, it had undergone a complete change in cast and crew. The new film, Oh Manapenne!, was shot between December 2019 and February 2020. It was released on 22 October 2021 via Disney+ Hotstar.

== Plot ==
Karthik, lethargic by nature, completes his B.E. by clearing his subjects after almost five years. His dream is to become a chef and open a restaurant, but he receives no support from his father. Shruthi is a very focused girl who works hard to fulfill her dreams of going to Australia. However, her father shows no interest, as she is a girl and he wanted a boy instead. When Karthik and Shruthi meet at a matchmaking event, her younger cousin, Barath, accidentally locks the door, which jams very often, leaving them stuck in the same room. To pass time, they talk about their past.

Shruthi reveals that she was in love with a man named Arjun. They both wanted to start a food truck business. Arjun went to Bangalore to talk with his father about their love and business. Meanwhile, Shruthi started her plan eagerly and was ready to surprise Arjun by buying the truck. But things went wrong and Arjun did not come back, because he became engaged. Shruthi and her father waited for him but when they realised Arjun was not coming back, her father decided to get her married to someone else.

On his turn, Karthik reveals that he was unemployed and always went out with his two friends, Sathya and Faizal. So Karthik and his friends made cooking videos, as he is passionate about cooking. But it was not profitable enough, so they took to prank videos and were caught by Karthik's father, which ended their plan.

It is then revealed, after the door is fixed, that Karthik came to the wrong address for his matchmaking event. Later, Karthik goes to his actual matchmaking event, which is with a rich family. Meanwhile, Shruthi tells the man coming to her matchmaking event that she is not interested in the marriage. The family of Karthik's prospective bride wants him to be able to run a business, so he and Shruthi decide to operate the food truck themselves, with Karthik as the chef, and Shruthi in charge of the business side of things. At first, they face many difficulties, mainly because of Karthik and his friends' laziness as well as fighting with Shruthi and giving up the food truck.

Later, Karthik visits Shruthi's house and informs her father that he should be proud to have such a responsible daughter. He also claims that if he ever gets a son like him, he would wish to have a daughter like Shruthi and insists that he let her pursue her dreams. Because of this, Shruthi understands the good nature of Karthik and later convinces Karthi's father that he is a talented cook by cooking them Karthik's recipe. Then they kickstart their business with the support of both their parents. After this, their food truck became a major success. In the process, they fall in love without realising it, but Karthi has an engagement party a few days later, so they drift apart. After realising they love each other, they come back together through a radio show organised by Shruthi's friend Ramya. With the support of their family and friends, Karthik and Shruthi reunite successfully.

== Cast ==
- Harish Kalyan as Karthik
- Priya Bhavani Shankar as Shruthi
- Venu Arvind as Karthik's father
- Anbu Thasan as Sathya
- Abishek Kumar as Faizal
- K. S. G. Venkatesh as Shruthi's father
- Ashwin Kumar Lakshmikanthan as Arjun
- Samyuktha Viswanathan as Aditi
- Anish Kuruvilla as Aditi's father
- Siddhanth as the chef

== Production ==
=== Development ===
In late October 2016, Gautham Vasudev Menon bought the rights to remake the Telugu film Pelli Choopulu (2016) in Tamil, under his banner Ondraga Entertainment. The film was titled Pon Ondru Kandein, and was to be directed by Menon's assistant Senthil Veerasamy. In March 2017, Menon chose Vishnu Vishal and Tamannaah Bhatia as the lead actors. S. R. Kathir was chosen as the cinematographer, with Darbuka Siva and Praveen Anthony as the music composer and editor respectively. Though Vishal anticipated that filming would begin in July or August 2017, the start of filming faced repeated delays, and ultimately by December, Vishal opted out of the project as he could no longer allot new dates due to the delays. The project was eventually dropped due to budget constraints.

Though Menon initially planned on continuing with a new cast and lower budget, by November 2019 the project had undergone a complete change in cast and crew. The new film was jointly produced by A Studios LLP, A Havish Production, SP Cinemas, Madhav Media and Third Eye Entertainment, with Kaarthikk Sundar, a former associate of A. L. Vijay, making his directorial debut, and Satyanarayana Koneru and Ramesh Varma Penmesta handling production duties. The screenplay was written by Deepak Sundarrajan, cinematography was handled by Krishnan Vasant and editing by Kripakaran. The title Oh Manapenne! was revealed on 1 October 2020, derived from the song of the same name from Vinnaithaandi Varuvaayaa (2010). Kaarthikk said, "We wanted to have a title that refers to weddings/matchmaking. The names that we had zeroed in on were either too old or not interesting enough", but when he was listening to the song, he chose that as the film's title. Kaarthikk chose not to do a shot-for-shot remake, but kept the original film's essence, and added, "Since Southern States have many commonalities, there was not much to change".

=== Casting ===
In November 2019, Harish Kalyan was announced as the lead actor, and a month later Priya Bhavani Shankar as the lead actress. In a December 2019 interview, Kaarthikk said that after watching Pelli Choopulu, he told Harish he would be a "perfect fit" as the lead actor if the film was to be remade in Tamil. In an October 2020 interview, Kaarthikk said that when he thought of the lead characters of Pelli Choopulu, Harish and Priya came to his mind and he was convinced they could pull off the roles of a "boy-next-door" and "bossy character" respectively with conviction. In preparation for his role as a chef, Harish learnt cooking from Siddhanth, the owner of the barbecue food truck Spitfire BBQ, on whose life the original film was based. The team also approached Siddhanth to play a minor role. The film is the feature debut of theatre actor Abishek Kumar, who Kaarthik cast because of their friendship and Kaarthik's belief that he was a "natural actor". Abishek said he sought to avoid deep preparation and method acting, and that he was "just trying to fit the role in the most natural way possible".

=== Filming ===
Principal photography began on 11 December 2019, and wrapped in February 2020, a week before the COVID-19 lockdown in India was declared. Post-production works began soon after filming wrapped. According to Kaarthikk, "The lockdown only helped us as we could patiently edit and get it done".

== Music ==
The soundtrack was composed by Vishal Chandrashekhar. It consists of four songs and two instrumentals. The song "Lazy Song" fuses Carnatic music with the western blues and jazz genres. It was released on 26 February 2021 as a single. Another single "Bodhai Kaname" was released on 30 July 2021. The third single "Aao Ji Aao" was released on 15 October 2021.

Track listing
No.	Title	Lyrics	Singer(s)	Length
1.	"Oh Manapenne"	Mohan Rajan	Sinduri Vishal	3:32
2.	"Lazy Song"	Mohan Rajan	Sinduri Vishal, Lady Kash	3:10
3.	"Nee Yenadharuginil Nee"	Niranjan Bharathi	Shakthisree Gopalan	2:42
4.	"Aao Ji Aao"	Mohan Rajan	Gana Bala	2:58
5.	"Bodhai Kaname"	Vivek	Anirudh Ravichander, Shashaa Tirupati	4:22
6.	"Sakiye"	Mohan Rajan	Yazin Nizar	4:00
Total length:				20:44

== Release and reception ==
Oh Manapenne! was released on 22 October 2021 via Disney+ Hotstar. M. Suganth of The Times of India called it "a worthy remake that is as charming and delightful" as the Telugu original. Ashameera Aiyappan of Firstpost said Oh Manapenne! "is a light, breezy film about love and aspirations. It might work better if watched as a stand-alone film, without the lingering presence of Pelli Choopulu looming ahead of it". Janani K of India Today appreciated the film's faithfulness to the original and said Priya delivered a "standout performance". Kirubhakar Purushothaman of The New Indian Express wrote, "Rarely does a remake outshine its source material, and Oh Manapenne!, though competent, does not match up to the original Telugu film". Praveen Sundar of The Hindu wrote, "There is hardly anything that does not serve the purpose of the plot. No unnecessary action sequences. No independent comedy tracks. No narration-pausing songs. And there is nothing extraordinary at stake too: it is just a boy meets girl story. But how they meet and how that meeting changes their lives makes it heart-warming". Sify wrote, "Vishal Chandrasekhar's music is the lifeline of the film, his songs and score have helped the film big time" and concluded that the makers of Oh Manapenne! had "replicated the magic of the original in their own way".
