= Kurangani =

Hill station in Tamil Nadu, India

Coordinates: 8°37′04″N 77°59′46″E

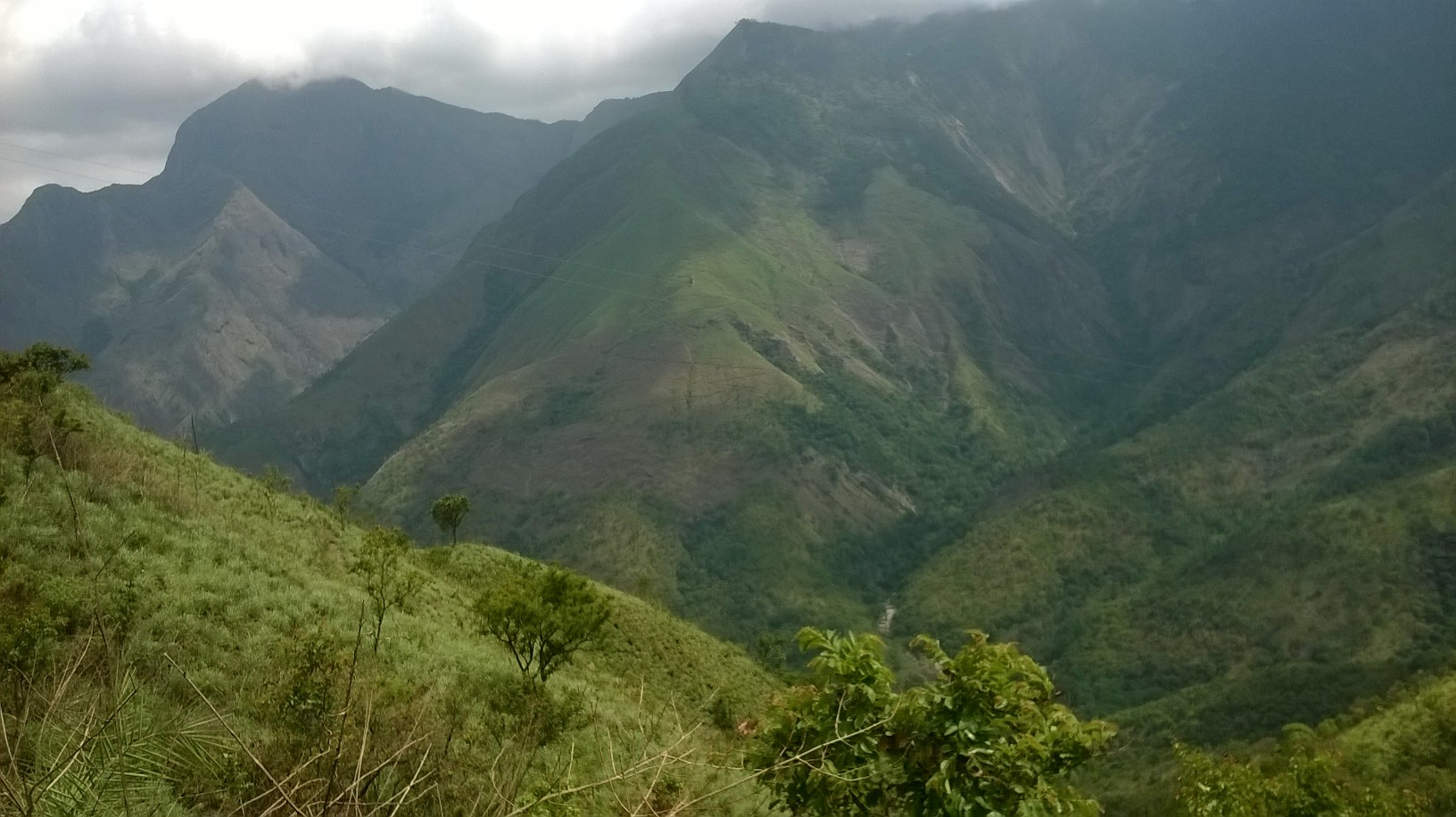
Kurangani hills

Kurangani is a hill station atop the Western Ghats accessed from Bodinayakkanur in the Indian state of Tamil Nadu. Kurangani literally means "the place which wears monkeys as its jewels" in Tamil. It has estates that grow coconuts, mangoes, various spices, and coffee. Trekking in the hills also substantially contributes to the economy of Kurangani.

== Geography ==
A mountain stream passes between Kurangani mountains in the east and Kolukkumalai in the west. The hills are characterized by frequently-changing weather, low-hanging clouds, chilly atmosphere and strong winds, and are home to a wide range of flora and fauna including Indian gaurs, barking deer, langurs, wild cats, leopards and tigers.

Kurangani has more than 6 small streams. All join into the Kottakudi River, where they then flow into Vaigai Dam.

== Attractions ==
The Kurangani Hills near Bodinayakkanur in Theni district are suitable for trekking and nature walks.

Attractions include the Kurangani Top Station, that gives views of the Kolukkumalai tea estate, the world's highest tea plantation at an altitude 8,000 feet (2,400 m) above sea level. The station is currently only reachable via Poombarai and Munnar in Kerala. A stone foundation was laid in 1989 to provide a route via Kurangani, but no further construction has taken place. This has caused anger from local farmers, who have staged protests and submitted petitions calling for the route's completion.

In 2018 a wildfire broke out on the Kurangani Hills, killing 36 people. A subsequent investigation blamed the Environment and Forest Department for the incident, citing poor training of hike organisers. As a result of the incident, the state of Tamil Nadu closed all trekking routes, only reopening them again in 2024 after significant upgrades.

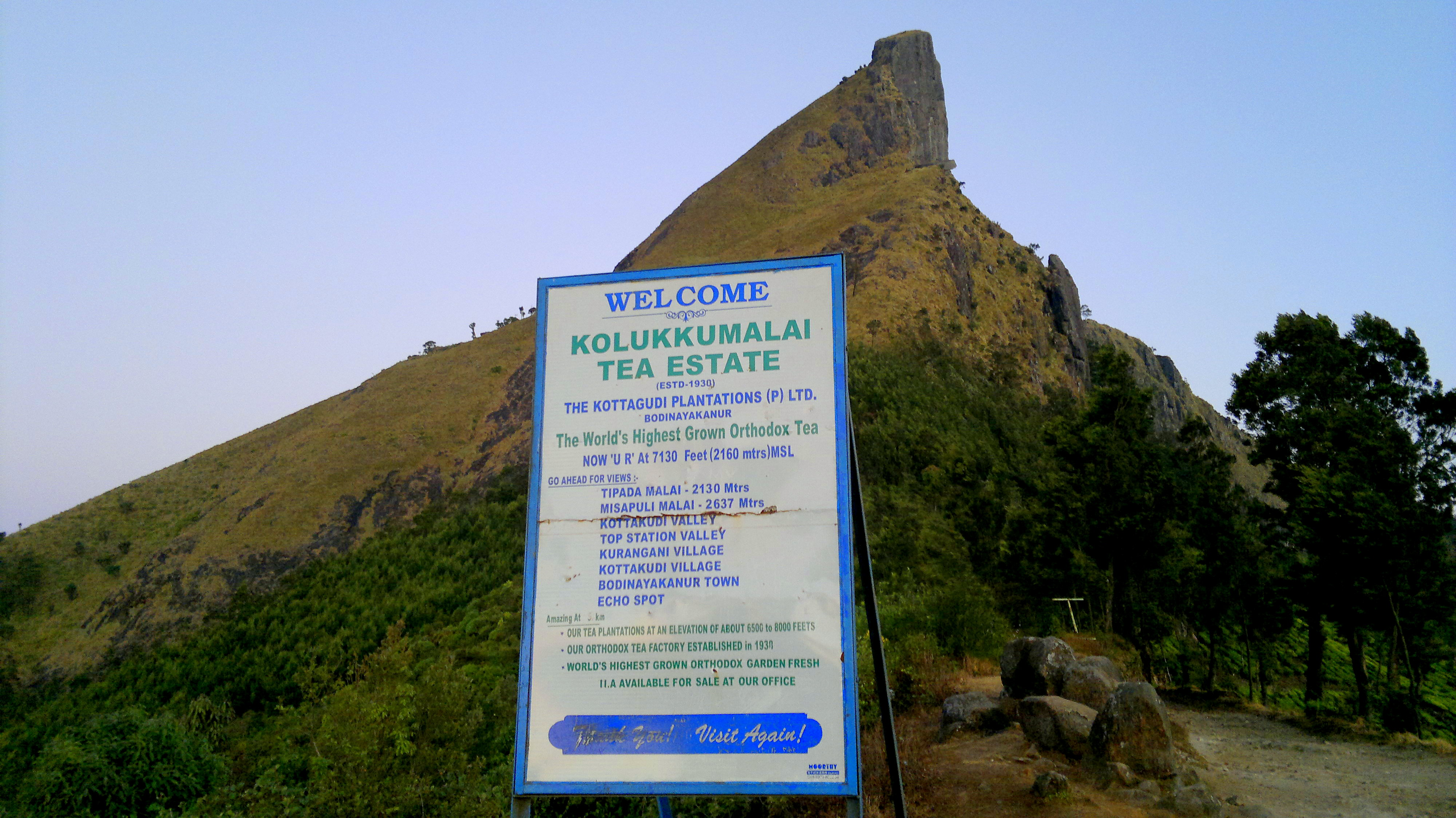
Kollukumalai

The films Alagar Samiyin Kuthurai, Myna and Kumki were shot there.

Samabalaru falls is the source of Kottakudi river which serves the drinking water needs of Bodinayakanur.

The central village has a population of 200 people and 50 houses. Lodging is available in Top Station, Bodinayakanur and Munnar. along with two cottages in the central village.
