= Samy (director) =

Indian film director

- Occupations: Director, screenwriter
- Years active: 2001–present

Samy is an Indian Tamil film director and a screenwriter. Several of his films have been criticised for depicting controversial content on screen.

== Career ==
Samy started his career assisting directors such as Balu Mahendra and S. A. Chandrasekar, and worked as a dialogue writer for R. Sarathkumar starrer Dost (2001). He made his directorial debut with Uyir (2006), which revolved around a woman who falls in love with her brother-in-law after the demise of her husband. The film became controversial upon release due to its bold content but did well at box office. His second film Mirugam (2007) which dealt with a cruel villager who is suffering from HIV was met with a controversy after Samy assaulted the actress Padmapriya by slapping her in front of the crew and the village people. The South Indian Film Industry imposed a one-year ban on him for his behaviour on set, but later the ban was reduced to six months due to constant lobbying by the producers' associations.

In 2008, Samy began working on a project titled Sarithram starring Rajkiran and Aadhi which was said to be dealing with the subject of Silambam; however despite launch the project was shelved. He then made his comeback with Sindhu Samaveli (2010) with entirely new cast. Like his previous ventures this film too attracted controversy because of its content. The film had a low-key release and met with contrasting reviews, whilst some critics refused to give the film a rating, declaring their disgust at the film's plot. In 2011, he worked on Chithiram starring Rajendra Prasad, Veluthu Kattu Kathir, and Sanchita Padukone, but the film did not take off. His next film Kangaroo (2015) would be dedicated to caring mothers and stated that it was a family friendly film, marking a change from the controversial themes of his previous three projects. The film had a low key release and went unnoticed. In 2019, it was announced that Samy would direct Akka Kuruvi, an official remake of the 1997 Iranian film Children of Heaven.

== Filmography ==
Year	Title	Director	Writer	Notes
2001	Dost	No	Dialogues	
2006	Uyir	Yes	Yes	
2007	Mirugam	Yes	Yes	
2010	Sindhu Samaveli	Yes	Yes	
2015	Kangaroo	Yes	Yes	
2022	Akka Kuruvi	Yes	Screenplay	
