= Poriyaalan =

2014 Indian film by Thanukumar

- Film poster
- Directed by: Thanukumar
- Written by: Manimaran
- Produced by: Vetrimaaran; A. K. Vetri Velavan; M. Devarajulu
- Starring: Harish Kalyan; Anandhi; Achyuth Kumar
- Cinematography: Velraj
- Edited by: G. B. Venkatesh
- Music by: M. S. Jones Rupert
- Production companies: Grass Root Film Company; Ace Mass Medias
- Distributed by: Vendhar Movies
- Release date: 5 September 2014
- Country: India
- Language: Tamil

Poriyaalan (transl. Engineer) is a 2014 Indian Tamil-language romantic action thriller film directed by Thanukumar, written by Manimaran, and produced by Vetrimaaran. The film features Harish Kalyan and Anandhi in the leading roles. Velraj is the cinematographer for the venture, while newcomer M. S. Jones Rupert composed the music. The film released on 5 September 2014.

== Cast ==
- Harish Kalyan as Saravanan Prabhu
- Anandhi as Vijaya Shanthi (Credited as Rakshita)
- Achyuth Kumar as Sundar
- Mohan Raman as Shastri
- Aadukalam Naren as Construction Company Boss
- Delhi Ganesh as College Principal
- Udhayabhanu Maheswaran as Saravanan's father
- Ajay Rathnam as Banker
- Mayilsamy as Uncle
- Madhan Bob as Civil Engineering Professor
- Crane Manohar as Fraud
- Munnar Ramesh as Ramesh
- Bava Lakshmanan as Land Seller
- Ajay Raj as Prabhu
- Boys Rajan as Shanti's father
- Ravi Venkatraman as Rajendran
- Rajapandi
- Fahad Nasar
- Velraj as Velraj (Cameo appearance)
- Gaana Bala in a cameo appearance

== Soundtrack ==
The soundtrack was composed by M. S. Jones Rupert.

Track listing
No.	Title	Lyrics	Singer(s)	Length
1.	"Yaedhaedho Sila Yaekkangal"	Yugabharathi	Indira Ramanan	3:46
2.	"Porappu Erappu"	Gana Bala	Gana Bala	4:10
3.	"Kan Rendum"	Na. Muthukumar	G. V. Prakash Kumar, Saindhavi	2:54
4.	"Haryana Devathaikku"	Yugabharathi	Suchitra	3:54
5.	"Un Vizhiyil"	Yugabharathi	Haricharan	3:42

== Production ==
The film was first announced in January 2013, with reports claiming that a Vetrimaaran's Associate Dharmaraj would make the film for Ace Mass Media with Harish Kalyan in the lead role. The film progressed slowly until November 2013, when it was announced that director Vetrimaaran would produce the film which had been written by Manimaran of Udhayam NH4 fame. The film's director was revealed to be Thanukumar, with over ninety percent of the film having been completed. Rakshita, who has previously appeared in Telugu films and in Kayal (2014), played the lead role.

== Release ==
The distribution rights of the film were acquired by Vendhar Movies. The film was released on 5 September 2014.

== Critical reception ==
Baradwaj Rangan from The Hindu wrote, "Poriyaalan is a sort of sibling to Vetrimaaran’s first film, Polladhavan...What sets these films apart from the typical action-thrillers is their texture — you can taste the grit. The storytelling, after (a) flabby beginning, is superbly economic...the film makes good on its promise of a tight little thriller, with mostly adequate performances". The Times of India gave the film 3 stars out of 5 and wrote, "If the film succeeds, it is mainly because of its screenplay by Mani Maaran. Barring one hard-to-believe turn, it manages to hit the right buttons to keep us on the edge of the seat. It is racy, thrilling and entertaining".
