= Mirugam =

- Poster
- Directed by: Samy
- Written by: Samy
- Produced by: Karthik Jai
- Starring: Aadhi; Padmapriya
- Cinematography: Ramnath Shetty
- Edited by: Suresh Urs
- Music by: Sabesh–Murali
- Production company: Karthik Jai Movies
- Release date: 14 December 2007
- Country: India
- Language: Tamil

Mirugam (transl. Animal) is a 2007 Indian Tamil-language erotic drama film written and directed by Samy. The film stars Padmapriya and the debutant Aadhi. The music was composed by Sabesh–Murali with editing by Suresh Urs and cinematography by Ramnath Shetty. The film was released on 14 December 2007.

== Plot ==
In a village near Ramnad, Ayyanar is a carefree villager who relies on his muscles rather than his brain in any situation and behaves like an animal. He is a terror to the whole village as he is a womaniser, sleeps with sex workers, and rapes housewives. There is no woman in the village with whom he has not had an encounter. He beats up anyone, including his mother. He makes a living through his bull, which he hires out for its stud services.

During one of Ayyanar's visits to the local brothel, he rapes the queen sex worker Savithri but refuses to pay for her services. He sleeps with her multiple times and uses her in his sexual play. Once, he is seen playing cards on the outskirts of the neighbouring village, when a player's wife comes and scolds him. Ayyanar, smitten by the wife, wins all the bets and gets the player drunk. He takes the player to his home, gives the player's kids stolen chicken curry to eat outside, and silently rapes the player's wife.

One day, Ayyanar meets Alagamma, a tomboyish girl. Her beauty strikes him, and he marries her, but treats her like one of his conquests. On the first night, he rapes her and continues with his sexual exploits. She silently tolerates all the sexual activities that he performs on her. She begins to understand him and change her mind about him after knowing his past, of being the son of a prostitute who was raped multiple times in front of him. He has seen her having sex with multiple men at the same time. He later killed the manager of the ring and escaped to Ramnad, where he was adopted. Alagamma decides to change Ayyanar and bring him on the right path with love, sex, and affection.

Fate takes a turn when the cops haul in Ayyanar after a drunken fight, and he is sentenced to a year in jail. In jail, he gets addicted to drugs, shares the same syringes and needles with other prisoner. Savithri, having a grudge against him, visits Ayyanar in jail and manipulates him into believing that his wife cheated on him with her uncle. After coming out of jail, he visits Alagamma, accuses her of being a cheater, and forces her to abort the child as he doubts her fidelity. To save the child, she flees the scene as he chases her. She manages to get admitted to a government hospital. While searching for his wife's whereabouts, Ayyanar comes across a mentally ill female beggar, who asks him to offer her some change, but he rapes her.

After the beggar leaves, he faints, and Idi Thangi takes him to the nearby government hospital, where Ayyanar meets his wife and his newborn son. Still believing she cheated on him, he tries to kill the child by throwing it, but Alagamma saves the child and beats Ayyanar for his actions. Later, the doctor checks why Ayyanar fainted, and they initially assume it is appendicitis. Alagamma signs the necessary documents for the operation procedure. After checking the lab results, the doctor informs Alagamma that Ayyanar is infected with HIV/AIDS. Alagamma's uncle, who brought food for Ayyanar, emotionally tells him that Alagamma is like a daughter to him, which makes Ayyanar realise his mistake in doubting their relationship. When returning to his village, Ayyanar ends up having sex with a Karakattam dancer.

Alagamma notices Ayyanar's health condition worsening, so she asks if she can take him to the hospital, but he refuses. Alagamma goes to work to cover the expenses, which he also refuses, and he takes his bull to the neighbouring village to make some money. When he walks on the path with his bull, the nurse recognises him and informs Savithri that Ayyanar is an HIV/AIDS patient, which she shares with the villagers. The villagers, having no proper knowledge of the disease, initially throw stones at Ayyanar, threatening to drive him out of the village. Alagamma rushes there and argues with the villagers, but the police and doctor take custody of Ayyanar and put him in a special care cell for lab tests. While he is in the cell, the villagers set Ayyanar's house on fire. With the doctor's help, Alagamma gets a court order stating that Alagamma and Ayyanar can live in the village.

The villagers ignore and avoid Ayyanar, believing the disease may spread through physical contact. At night, depressed, Ayyanar goes to Savithri's house and knocks on the door, but she refuses. Alagamma arrives and takes him home, offering herself to him, saying the doctor said they can have protected sex, but he refuses, saying he does not want to infect her. After everyone falls asleep, he runs away from the house, fearing he will die of humiliation if he stays there since the villagers are hostile towards him.

After leaving the village, he travels to Chennai by truck, while Alagamma searches for him everywhere in the nearby villages. A few years later, the doctor informs Alagamma that Ayyanar has been found and is in Tambaram hospital. She visits him there with their son and begs him to return home. Although he initially refuses, citing his worsened condition, he eventually agrees and returns to the village. However, the villagers block the way and demand that they stay on the outskirts of the village, which they agree to.

After his foster mother's demise, Ayyanar visits the officials and informs them that his mother died because their village has no proper source of water. After his request, the water resources department installs a pump in their village. Still, the villagers are hostile towards Ayyanar. At one point, he loses his sight, and one of the villagers stabs him to death. Ayyanar stops Alagamma from rushing after the killer, saying he might be someone who might be affected by him, and eventually, he dies. Alagamma asks the villagers to help her perform her husband's final rites, but they offer no help. With no other option, she carries her husband's corpse herself to the cremation ground and performs the final rites along with her son.

== Cast ==
- Aadhi as Ayyanar
- Padmapriya Janakiraman as Alagamma
- Ganja Karuppu as Idi Thangi
- Bhanu Chander as Alagamma's uncle
- Naren as Veerasamy, Panchayat leader of the nearby village
- Sona as Savithri
- Lakshmiammal as Ayyanar's adoptive mother
- A. M. Karthikeyan
- Velmurugan

== Production ==
Samy, who was in search of a new actor for the film, spotted Aadhi, son of Telugu film director Ravi Raja Pinisetty at silambam classes and chose him to act. Many actresses, including Sneha, declined to be the lead actress before Padmapriya was cast.

== Controversies ==
During the final stages of filming, Samy slapped Padmapriya, allegedly because she could not perform to his satisfaction. In October 2007, the Nadigar Sangam imposed a one-year ban on him from directing films, following a complaint filed by Padmapriya, but the ban was lifted almost six months later due to lobbying by Samy, who alleged his other directorial venture Sarithiram was being delayed.

Blue Cross of India and Animal Welfare Board of India objected to the scene of jallikattu, saying animals were tortured and wrote a letter to the Central Board of Film Certification not to issue a clearance certificate; hence the board requested Samy to remove the scene to which he agreed.

== Soundtrack ==
The music was composed by Sabesh–Murali, with lyrics by Na. Muthukumar.

Track listing
No.	Title	Singer(s)	Length
1.	"Adityhi Yathi"	Sadhana Sargam
2.	"Muratukkala Mandathadi"	Puduvai Jeyamorthi, Chinnaponnu
3.	"Oru Aatukutiy Alakale"	Chinmayi
4.	"Pethavakooda Pathumasam"	K. J. Yesudas
5.	"Theivangal Enge"	Shankar Mahadevan
6.	"Vaargona Vaargona"	Mahalakshmi Iyer, Suchitra, Chinnaponnu

== Critical reception ==
Sify wrote "The film strikes a chord because the concern of the director to highlight the plight of an AIDS patient in the post interval scenes is facetious. Throughout the film the director becomes more of a voyeur and dialogues loaded with sexual overtones. And surely Samy knows the difference between exploitation and cause-orientation". Pavithra Srinivasan of Rediff.com wrote "Watch Mirugam for some realistically done rural fare. With all the dollops of sex, action, and messages, it harks back to the good old masala genre, spiced according to today's specifications."

Malini Mannath of Chennai Online wrote "A tighter reign [sic] on the narration would have brought in more clarity and focus to the film. Appreciable is the director's daring to take on such a theme. But the finesse is missing, the director going overboard both in depicting Ayyanar's moral depravity and in the scenes of the backlash on him towards the later part where he is depicted as a victim of AIDS". S. R. Ashok Kumar of The Hindu wrote "The director of ‘Mirugam’ deserves to be commended for making a film with a message — eradication of AIDS. Padmapriya has chipped in with good work but with no other stars to boast, the film fails to make an impact".

== Accolades ==
Mirugam won the Tamil Nadu State Film Award for Best Film Portraying Woman in Good Light, Padmapriya won the Best Actress (Special Prize) award and Mahalakshmi Iyer won for Best Female Playback Singer.
