= Bigg Boss (Tamil TV series) season 2 =

Bigg Boss
- Season 2
- Bigg Boss Tamil 2 logo
- Presented by: Kamal Haasan
- No. of days: 105
- No. of housemates: 17
- Winner: Riythvika
- Runner-up: Aishwarya Dutta
- No. of episodes: 106

Release
- Original network: Star Vijay
- Original release: 17 June – 30 September 2018

Season chronology
- ← Previous; Season 1 Next → Season 3

Bigg Boss 2 is the second season of the Tamil-Indian reality television series, Bigg Boss, and was hosted by Kamal Haasan. The season had 17 housemates (including wildcard entries), and was filmed with 60 cameras. It ran for 15 weeks (from 17 June to 30 September 2018), and aired on Star Vijay weekdays from 9–10:30 am and 9–11:00 pm on weekends. Hotstar provided content not aired on television and provided Fun Unlimited, a parallel weekly programme. Hosted by Rio Raj, it humorously described events in the house.

The first season's lavish house set, on the outskirts of Chennai at EVP Film City in Chembarambakkam, was renovated just before the start of this season. The renovated house included a "jail room" to increase the severity of punishment for contestant mistakes.

The winner of Bigg Boss Tamil 2 was Riythvika, who won a trophy and a cash prize of ₹50 lakhs (₹5 million). Aishwarya Dutta was the runner-up, and the other finalist was Janani Iyer. Even though Riythvika won the title, actress Mumtaz was widely talked about during this season telecast which earned her lot of fans

This is the first season to have a female winner in the Bigg Boss Tamil franchise.

Thaadi Balaji and Shariq Hassan returned as contestants in Bigg Boss Ultimate season 1.

== Housemate status ==
SR.	Housemate	Day Entered	Day Exited	Status
1	Riythvika	Day 1	Day 105	Winner
2	Aishwarya	Day 1	Day 105	1st Runner-up
3	Vijayalakshmi	Day 67	Day 105	2nd Runner-up
4	Janani	Day 1	Day 105	3rd Runner-up
5	Yashika	Day 1	Day 98	Evicted
6	Balaji	Day 1	Day 97	Evicted
7	Mumtaz	Day 1	Day 91	Evicted
8	Sendrayan	Day 1	Day 84	Evicted
9	Daniel	Day 1	Day 77	Evicted
10	Mahat	Day 1	Day 70	Ejected
11	Vaishnavi	Day 1	Day 42	Secret Room
11	Vaishnavi	Day 44	Day 62	Evicted
12	Ponnambalam	Day 1	Day 56	Evicted
13	Shariq	Day 1	Day 49	Evicted
14	Ramya	Day 1	Day 35	Evicted
15	Nithya	Day 1	Day 28	Evicted
16	Ananth	Day 1	Day 21	Evicted
17	Mamathi Chari	Day 1	Day 14	Evicted

== Housemates ==
=== Original entrants ===
1. Yashika Aannand, a model and actress known for her roles in the films Dhuruvangal Pathinaaru (2016) and Iruttu Araiyil Murattu Kuththu (2018)
2. Ponnambalam, an actor and stuntman who has appeared primarily as an antagonist in Tamil films
3. Mahat Raghavendra, an actor known for his roles in the films Mankatha (2011), Jilla (2014) and Chennai 600028 II (2016)
4. Daniel Annie Pope, an actor known for his role in the film Idharkuthane Aasaipattai Balakumara (2013)
5. Vaishnavi, a journalist, writer, activist and radio jockey who is the granddaughter of Tamil writer Saavi.
6. Janani Iyer, an actress known for playing lead roles in the films Avan Ivan (2011), Thegidi (2014) and Adhe Kangal (2017)
7. Ananth Vaidyanathan, a singing trainer known for his roles in Star Vijay's Super Singer and Avan Ivan (2011)
8. Ramya NSK, playback singer and granddaughter of N. S. Krishnan and T. A. Mathuram
9. Sendrayan, an actor known for his roles in the films Moodar Koodam (2013) and Metro (2016)
10. Riythvika, an actress known for her roles in the films Madras (2014), Kabali (2016) and Iru Mugan (2016)
11. Mumtaz, an actress and dancer who has appeared primarily in character roles and item numbers in Tamil films
12. Thadi Balaji, an actor who has appeared as a comedian in Tamil films and Tamil TV serials and is a judge in Star Vijay's Kalakka Povathu Yaaru
13. Mamathi Chari, a television actress, anchor and video jockey who hosted Hello Tamizha and appeared in the Sun TV series Vani Rani
14. Nithya, a mom of one and she is the commoner contestant of this season. She is the spouse of co–housemate Balaji
15. Shariq Hassan, an actor who appeared in the film Pencil (2016) and the son of Riyaz Khan and Uma Riyaz Khan and grandson of Kamala Kamesh
16. Aishwarya Dutta, an actress who appeared in the films Tamizhuku En Ondrai Azhuthavum (2015) and Paayum Puli (2015)

=== Wildcard entry ===
1.Vijayalakshmi Feroz, actress, producer and daughter of director Agathiyan who starred in the films Chennai 600028 (2007), Anjathe (2008) and Chennai 600028 II (2016) and the Sun TV series Nayaki

== Guests appearance ==
Week	Day	Guest(s)	Purpose of visit
1	0	Oviya (Season 1 contestant)	To give the housemates advice and wish them luck
4	26	Karthi, Soori and Pandiraj	To promote their film, Kadaikutty Singam
5	30	Snehan (Season 1 runner-up)	To take a class as part of the week-five luxury-budget task
5	32	Children from Chennai orphanages	To spend time with the housemates
6	41	Pooja Kumar, Andrea Jeremiah, Sathyaprakash and Mohamaad Ghibran	To promote their film, Vishwaroopam 2
7	47	Arya, Sathish, Dhivyadharshini and Santhosh P. Jayakumar	To promote their film, Ghajinikanth
8	54	Harish Kalyan and Raiza Wilson (Season 1 contestants) and Elan	To promote their film, Pyaar Prema Kaadhal
8	56	Kamal Haasan (host)	To announce the evicted housemate for week eight
11	72	Mumtaz's mother, brother and nephew	To surprise Mumtaz, Janani and Yashika as part of the week's luxury-budget task
11	72	Janani's mother and sister	To surprise Mumtaz, Janani and Yashika as part of the week's luxury-budget task
11	72	Yashika's brother and sister	To surprise Mumtaz, Janani and Yashika as part of the week's luxury-budget task
11	73	Daniel's mother and girlfriend	To surprise Daniel, Aishwarya and Riythvika as part of the week's luxury-budget task
11	73	Aishwarya's mother	To surprise Daniel, Aishwarya and Riythvika as part of the week's luxury-budget task
11	73	Riythvika's parents	To surprise Daniel, Aishwarya and Riythvika as part of the week's luxury-budget task
11	73	A joker	To entertain the housemates as part of the week's luxury-budget task
11	74	Sendrayan's wife and parents	To surprise Sendrayan, Balaji and Vijayalakshmi as part of the week's luxury-budget task
11	74	Nithya Balaji (ex-contestant) and Poshika Balaji	To surprise Sendrayan, Balaji and Vijayalakshmi as part of the week's luxury-budget task
11	74	Vijayalakshmi's husband and son	To surprise Sendrayan, Balaji and Vijayalakshmi as part of the week's luxury-budget task
13	85–91	Gayathri Raghuram, Harathi Ganesh, Snehan, Suja Varunee and Vaiyapuri (Season 1 contestants)	Guests for a week
13	88–89	Aarav (Season 1 winner)	To announce the Ticket to Finale task and release the first look of his film, Raja Bheema
14	97	Samvitha and Jayakumar (Amazon SMS Contest winners)	To bring the items bought with the week's luxury budget
15	99	Vaishnavi Prasad and Ramya NSK (ex-contestants)	To spend time with the finalists, give them advice and wish them luck
15	100	Shariq Hassan Khan and Nithya Balaji (ex-contestants)	To spend time with the finalists, give them advice and wish them luck
15	101	Yashika Aannand and Thadi Balaji (ex-contestants)	To spend time with the finalists, give them advice and wish them luck
15	102	Sendrayan and Mahat Raghavendra (ex-contestants)	To spend time with the finalists, give them advice and wish them luck
15	103	All evicted housemates, except Ponnambalam and Mumtaz	Reunion with the finalists
15	104	Aishwarya's friend, Swaroopa	To spend time with Aishwarya, Riythvika, Janani and Vijayalakshmi
15	104	Kalaiyarasan	To spend time with Aishwarya, Riythvika, Janani and Vijayalakshmi
15	104	Ashok Selvan	To spend time with Aishwarya, Riythvika, Janani and Vijayalakshmi
15	104	Kreshna and Sunaina	To spend time with Aishwarya, Riythvika, Janani and Vijayalakshmi
15	105		
15	105	All evicted housemates, except Ponnambalam	Invited to the Bigg Boss Tamil 2 Grand Finale.
15	105	Vijay Devarakonda	To unveil the season's trophy
15	105	Dancers	To escort Janani out of the Bigg Boss house after she finished fourth
15	105	Aarav (Season 1 winner)	To escort Vijayalakshmi out of the Bigg Boss house after she finished third
15	105	Kamal Haasan	To bring the final two housemates, Riythvika and Aishwarya, from the Bigg Boss house to the stage

== Weekly summary ==
Week 1	Entrances	Yashika Aannand, Ponnambalam, Mahat Raghavendra, Daniel Annie Pope, Vaishnavi Prasad, Janani Iyer, Ananth Vaidyanathan, Ramya NSK, Sendrayan, Riythvika, Mumtaz, Thadi Balaji, Mamathi Chari, Nithya Balaji, Shariq Hassan Khan and Aishwarya Dutta
Week 1	House captain	Janani
Week 1	Captain's competition	Mahat and Mumtaz
Week 1	In jail	None
Week 1	Nominations	Ananth, Mumtaz, Nithya and Riythvika
Week 1	Luxury budget tasks	Housemates provided feedback on each other; Feela Peela: Housemates are divided into two teams; one team tells a story, and the other must expose the lies in the story.; Ivar Yaar Endru Therigiradha: Housemates were divided into two teams, with one team telling a story and the other finding out who wrote it.; Sonnapadi Kelu: Housemates were divided into eight two-person teams, and each team must follow instructions in an envelope.
Week 1	Exits	None
Week 2
Week 2	House captain	Nithya
Week 2	Captain's competition	Mamathi and Ponnambalam
Week 2	In jail	None
Week 2	Nominations	Ananth, Mamathi, Mumtaz and Ponnambalam
Week 2	Luxury budget tasks	Intha Veetil Yaar Sirapaaga Nirvaagam Seyya Koodiyavargal - Aangala Pengala?: Housemates were divided into two gender-based teams; the male team is the owner, with the female team serving them. The roles later reversed.
Week 2	Exits	Mamathi (evicted on day 14)
Week 3
Week 3	House captain	Vaishnavi
Week 3	Captain's competition	Sendrayan
Week 3	In jail	None
Week 3	Nominations	Ananth, Balaji, Mumtaz, Nithya and Ponnambalam
Week 3	Luxury budget tasks	Thanni La Kandam: Housemates were divided into two teams, and each team must keep water from flowing out of a tank with their hands.
Week 3	Exits	Ananth (evicted on day 21)
Week 4
Week 4	House captain	Ramya (former captain), Nithya
Week 4	Captain's competition	All housemates (Ramya), self-nominated (Nithya)
Week 4	In jail	Ponnambalam, Yashika, Nithya and Mahat
Week 4	Nominations	Balaji, Nithya, Ponnambalam and Yashika
Week 4	Luxury budget tasks	Thittam Pottu Thirudara Kootam: Housemates were divided into three teams: thieves, police and ordinary citizens. The police and citizens need to stop the thieves from stealing, and the police will determine the thieves' punishment if they are caught.
Week 4	Exits	Nithya (evicted on day 28)
Week 5
Week 5	House captain	Mahat
Week 5	Captain's competition	Balaji and Shariq
Week 5	In jail	Balaji
Week 5	Nominations	Aishwarya, Balaji, Janani, Ponnambalam and Ramya
Week 5	Luxury budget tasks	Kanaa Kaanum Kaalangal: School-related tasks
Week 5	Exits	Ramya (evicted on day 35)
Week 6
Week 6	House captain	None
Week 6	Captain's Competition	N/A
Week 6	In jail	Mahat and Balaji
Week 6	Nominations	Mahat, Mumtaz, Ponnambalam, Vaishnavi and Yashika
Week 6	Luxury budget tasks	Enga Area Ulla Varadha: Housemates were split into two teams and given tasks to complete and rule different parts of the house.
Week 6	Exits	Vaishnavi (sent to the Secret Room on Day 42)
Week 7
Week 7	Entrances	Vaishnavi (re-entered on day 46 after four days in the Secret Room)
Week 7	House captain	Aishwarya
Week 7	Captain's competition	All housemates
Week 7	In jail	All housemates except Aishwarya, Daniel, Janani and Balaji
Week 7	Nominations	Balaji, Mahat, Mumtaz, Ponnambalam, Riythvika and Shariq
Week 7	Luxury budget tasks	Rani Maharani: Housemates must obey Aishwarya's orders, the house dictator
Week 7	Exits	Shariq (evicted on day 49)
Week 8
Week 8	House captain	Shariq (former captain), Yashika
Week 8	Captain's competition	Riythvika (Shariq), chosen by Shariq (Yashika)
Week 8	In jail	None
Week 8	Nominations	Janani, Ponnambalam and Sendrayan
Week 8	Luxury budget tasks	Yennaipol Oruvan: Housemates were divided into two teams, and each member must impersonate a member of the other team.
Week 8	Exits	Ponnambalam (evicted on day 56)
Week 9
Week 9	House captain	Aishwarya
Week 9	Captain's competition	Janani
Week 9	In jail	None
Week 9	Nominations	Daniel, Janani, Riythvika, Sendrayan and Vaishnavi
Week 9	Luxury budget tasks	Bommalattam: Housemates were divided into two teams, and each team must make toys from raw material brought from outside. A supervisor from each team checked the other team's toys and accepted or rejected them.)
Week 9	Exits	Vaishnavi (evicted on day 63)
Week 10
Week 10	Entrances	Vijayalakshmi Agathiyan (entered on day 67)
Week 10	House captain	Yashika
Week 10	Captain's competition	Mahat
Week 10	In jail	None
Week 10	Nominations	Balaji, Mahat, Mumtaz and Sendrayan
Week 10	Luxury budget tasks	Uthama Villaingal: Housemates were divided into two teams: super-heroes and super-villains. The superheroes must save someone in jail, and the super-villains tried to distract them. The teams switched roles the next day, to prevent the super-villains from making bombs.
Week 10	Exits	Mahat (Ejected with a red card on Day 70 for assaulting Daniel)
Week 11
Week 11	House captain	Mahat (former captain), Sendrayan
Week 11	Captain's competition	Aishwarya, Mumtaz, Sendrayan and Yashika (Mahat), chosen by Kamal Haasan (Sendrayan)
Week 11	In jail	None
Week 11	Nominations	Balaji, Daniel and Janani
Week 11	Luxury budget tasks	Freeze and Release: Housemates must freeze in place when Bigg Boss says "Freeze", until he says "Release". Failure was punished.
Week 11	Exits	Daniel (evicted on day 77)
Week 12
Week 12	House captain	Yashika
Week 12	Captain's competition	Aishwarya, Mumtaz, Riythvika, Sendrayan and Vijayalakshmi
Week 12	In jail	None
Week 12	Nominations	Aishwarya, Janani, Mumtaz, Sendrayan and Vijayalakshmi
Week 12	Luxury budget tasks	Housemates were told by phone that they were nominated for the following week's eviction, and must convince another housemate to perform a task to save themselves from the nomination.
Week 12	Exits	Sendrayan (evicted on day 84)
Week 13
Week 13	House captain	Riythvika
Week 13	Captain's competition	All housemates
Week 13	In jail	None
Week 13	Nominations	Aishwarya, Mumtaz, Riythvika and Vijayalakshmi
Week 13	Luxury budget tasks	Housemates performed tasks with some of the Season 1 contestants, who stayed in the house during the week as guests.; Suthi Suthi Vandheenga (Ticket to Finale task): Housemates walked on a round platform with a bowl of water in their hand. After each round, the bowls' water levels are checked. The housemate with the least water in their bowl was disqualified, and the last housemate had immunity until the final week.
Week 13	Exits	Mumtaz (evicted on day 91)
Week 14
Week 14	House captain	None
Week 14	Captain's competition	N/A
Week 14	In jail	None
Week 14	Nominations	Aishwarya, Balaji, Riythvika, Vijayalakshmi and Yashika
Week 14	Luxury budget task	Housemates must participate in tasks to accumulate points, and the housemate with the most points at the end received a prize.
Week 14	Exits	Vijayalakshimi (evicted on day 98)
Week 15 Final
Week 15 Final	House captain	None
Week 15 Final	Captain's competition	N/A
Week 15 Final	In jail	None
Week 15 Final	Luxury budget tasks	N/A
Week 15 Final	Finalists	During the final week, viewers voted for their choice. The finalists were Aishwarya Dutta, Janani Iyer, Riythvika and Vijayalakshmi Feroz.
Week 15 Final	Winner	Riythvika
Week 15 Final	Runner-up	Aishwariya Dutta
Week 15 Final	Third place	Yaashika Anand
Week 15 Final	Fourth place	Dhadee Balaji

== Events ==
- The partial audio launch of the Kamal Haasan's film Vishwaroopam 2 was held on 30 June 2018 during the ongoing season with Shruti Haasan invited as a special guest of the show to inaugurate the audio launch.
- In episode 53 (Day 52) aired on 8 August 2018, the Bigg Boss housemates were issued the notice of the death of 5-time former Chief Minister of Tamil Nadu M. Karunanidhi who died on 7 August 2018. They paid tribute to him and shared their memories of him during the show.
- On 10 September 2018 an air conditioning mechanic fell from the second floor of the set. His injuries resulted in death.
- On 26 September 2018, the Bigg Boss 2 votings were viewed in Vijay TV. When viewed, the votes of actresses Janani Iyer and Vijayalakshmi Feroz had decreased after a couple of hours instead of increasing. A rumour spread that the voting process is fake and the deducted votes from them were transferred to actress Aishwarya Dutta's votes in the final week of Bigg Boss 2.

== Nominations table ==
	Week 1	Week 2	Week 3	Week 4	Week 5	Week 6	Week 7	Week 8	Week 9	Week 10	Week 11	Week 12	Week 13	Week 14	Week 15	
House Captain	Janani	Nithya	Vaishnavi	Ramya	Mahat R	No; Captain	Aishwarya	Shariq	Aishwarya	Yashika	Mahat	Yashika	Riythvika		No; Captain	
House Captain	Janani	Nithya	Vaishnavi	Nithya	Mahat R	No; Captain	Aishwarya	Yashika	Aishwarya	Yashika	Sendrayan	Yashika	Riythvika		No; Captain	
Captain's Nominations	Vaishnavi; Ananth	Mumtaz; Daniel	Mahat; Balaji	Daniel	Sendrayan; Vaishnavi	No; Captain	Ponnambalam; Riythvika	Janani	Riythvika	Aishwarya (to save)	No; Nominations	Balaji; Sendrayan	Vijayalakshmi; Aishwarya; Mumtaz	No; Nominations	No; Captain	
Vote to:	Evict														WIN	
Rithyvika	Nithya; Mumtaz	Vaishnavi; Ananth	Balaji; Mumtaz	Nithya	Aishwarya; Ponnambalam	Yashika; Aishwarya	Balaji; Mahat	Sendrayan; Ponnambalam	Vaishnavi; Daniel	Mahat	No; Nominations	Mumtaz; Aishwarya	Nominated	Nominated	No; Nominations	**Winner** (Day 105)
Aishwarya	Nithya; Riythvika	Janani; Riythvika	Ponnambalam; Balaji	Yashika	Janani; Balaji	Herself (to save)	House; Captain	Janani; Riythvika	House; Captain	Mumtaz	No; Nominations	Janani; Vijayalakshmi	Not; Eligible	Nominated	No; Nominations	**1st runner-up** (Day 105)
Vijayalakshmi	Not In House									Exempt	No; Nominations	Mumtaz; Aishwarya	Not; Eligible	Nominated	No; Nominations	**2nd runner-up** (Day 105)
Janani	House; Captain	Mumtaz; Mamathi	Balaji; Mumtaz	Balaji	Aishwarya; Shariq	Yashika; Aishwarya	Mumtaz; Shariq	Sendrayan; Balaji	Daniel; Vaishnavi	Daniel	Nominated	Aishwarya; Sendrayan	Not; Eligible	Finalist	No; Nominations	**3rd runner-up** (Day 105)
Yashika	Ananth; Mumtaz	Ponnambalam; Ananth	Ponnambalam; Balaji	Herself	Janani; Balaji	Ponnambalam; Vaishnavi	Balaji; Riythvika	House; Captain	Vaishnavi; Janani	House; Captain	No; Nominations	House; Captain	Not; Eligible	Nominated	Evicted (Day 98)	
Balaji	Ananth; Ponnambalam	Mumtaz; Mamathi	Shariq; Aishwarya	Himself	Mumtaz; Aishwarya	Mumtaz; Aishwarya	Ponnambalam; Shariq	Daniel; Sendrayan	Mahat; Janani	Aishwarya	Nominated	Mumtaz; Aishwarya	Not; Eligible	Nominated	Evicted (Day 97)	
Mumtaz	Nithya; Riythvika	Vaishnavi; Sendrayan	Ponnambalam; Janani	Balaji	Vaishnavi; Janani	Sendrayan; Vaishnavi	Mahat; Janani	Sendrayan; Mahat	Daniel; Sendrayan	Mahat	No; Nominations	Vijayalakshmi; Aishwarya	Not; Eligible	Evicted (Day 91)		
Sendrayan	Mamathi; Ramya	Mamathi; Shariq	Mumtaz; Ponnambalam	Ponnambalam	Aishwarya; Yashika	Mumtaz; Vaishnavi	Mumtaz; Ponnambalam	Mahat; Vaishnavi	Mahat; Janani	Aishwarya	House; Captain	Janani; Mumtaz	Evicted (Day 84)			
Daniel	Ananth; Mumtaz	Ponnambalam; Ananth	Balaji; Mumtaz	Nithya	Balaji; Ponnambalam	Vaishnavi; Ponnambalam	Riythvika; Ponnambalam	Vaishnavi; Janani	Janani; Vaishnavi	Janani	Nominated	Evicted (Day 77)				
Mahat	Nithya; Ananth	Ponnambalam; Ananth	Ponnambalam; Sendrayan	Yashika	House; Captain	Nominated	Mumtaz; Ponnambalam	Sendrayan; Ponnambalam	Vaishnavi; Sendrayan	Mumtaz	Ejected (Day 70)					
Vaishnavi	Mumtaz; Aishwarya	Mamathi; Mumtaz	House; Captain	Ponnambalam	Aishwarya; Ponnambalam	Daniel; Mumtaz	Secret Room	Sendrayan; Ponnambalam	Sendrayan; Daniel	Evicted (Day 62)						
Ponnambalam	Mamathi; Riythvika	Daniel; Mumtaz	Mumtaz; Aishwarya	Himself	Balaji; Sendrayan	Daniel; Yashika	Mahat; Mumtaz	Daniel; Sendrayan	Evicted (Day 56)							
Shariq	Riythvika; Ponnambalam	Mamathi; Sendrayan	Sendrayan; Balaji	Ponnambalam	Janani; Vaishnavi	Vaishnavi; Ponnambalam	Mumtaz; Ponnambalam	Evicted (Day 49)								
Ramya	Ananth; Riythvika	Mamathi; Ponnambalam	Balaji; Ponnambalam	Nithya	Ponnambalam; Balaji	Evicted (Day 35)										
Nithya	Ananth; Mahat	House; Captain	.Mumtaz; Balaji	House; Captain	Evicted (Day 28)											
Ananth	Vaishnavi; Mumtaz	Daniel; Mumtaz	Ponnambalam; Balaji	Evicted (Day 21)												
Mamathi	Ponnambalam; Vaishnavi	Aishwarya; Mahat	Evicted (Day 14)													
Notes	1	none	2	3,4,5	none	6,7,8,10	9	11,12,13	14	15,16,17,18	19,20,21	none		22,23	6,24,25,26	none
Against public vote	Ananth; Mumtaz; Nithya; Riythvika	Ananth; Mamathi; Mumtaz; Ponnambalam	Ananth; Balaji; Mumtaz; Nithya; Ponnambalam	Balaji; Nithya; Ponnambalam; Yashika	Aishwarya; Balaji; Janani; Ponnambalam; Ramya	Mahat; Mumtaz; Ponnambalam; Vaishnavi; Yashika	Balaji; Mahat; Mumtaz; Ponnambalam; Riythvika; Shariq	Janani; Ponnambalam; Sendrayan	Daniel; Janani; Riythvika; Sendrayan; Vaishnavi	Balaji; Mahat; Mumtaz; Sendrayan	Balaji; Daniel; Janani	Aishwarya; Janani; Mumtaz; Sendrayan; Vijayalakshmi	Aishwarya; Mumtaz; Riythvika; Vijayalakshmi	Aishwarya; Balaji; Riythvika; Vijayalakshmi; Yashika	**Aishwarya**; **Janani**; **Riythvika**; **Vijayalakshmi**	
Ejected	None									**Mahat**	None					
Evicted	No; Eviciton	**Mamathi**	**Ananth**	**Nithya**	**Ramya NSK**	No; Eviciton	**Shariq**	**Ponnambalam**	**Vaishnavi**	**~~Mahat~~**	**Daniel**	**Sendrayan**	**Mumtaz**	**Balaji**	**Janani**	**Vijayalakshmi**
Evicted	No; Eviciton	**Mamathi**	**Ananth**	**Nithya**	**Ramya NSK**	No; Eviciton	**Shariq**	**Ponnambalam**	**Vaishnavi**	**~~Mahat~~**	**Daniel**	**Sendrayan**	**Mumtaz**	**Yashika**	**Aishwariya**	**Rithyvika**

=== Notes ===
House captain
Former house captain
Nominated for eviction before the regular nomination process
Granted immunity from nomination
Moved to the Secret Room
indicates the winner.
indicates the first runner up.
indicates the second runner up.
indicates the third runner up.
Evicted
Ejected
Nominated for eviction
BOLD, If a housemates name is in bold during "against public vote" it means that they are a finalist.

- **^Note 1**: No eviction during the first week, although the housemates each nominated two housemates for eviction.
- **^Note 2**: Nithya and Ananth were nominated for Week 3's eviction because they had performed poorly during the second week's luxury budget task. Daniel and Riythvika, who was nominated as the best performers of the same luxury-budget task, were saved from the following week's eviction.
- **^Note 3**: For the week-4 eviction, the housemates were divided into groups; each group had to decide who would be nominated for eviction. Although Balaji, Ponnambalam, and Yashika accepted the decision of their groups to nominate them for eviction (nominating themselves), Nithya nominated Daniel despite the rest of her group nominating her for eviction.
- **^Note 4**: Ramya was replaced by Nithya as week-4 captain and nominated for the following week's eviction by Bigg Boss after she refused to participate in the week's luxury budget task.
- **^Note 5**: Although Nithya became captain in the middle of Week 4, she was evicted at the end of the week with the fewest public votes.
- **^Note 6**: There was no house captain for weeks 6, 14 and 15.
- **^Note 7**: Mahat was sent to jail and nominated for eviction by Bigg Boss in week 6 for repeatedly breaking the house rules.
- **^Note 8**: Although Aishwarya was nominated for the week-6 eviction, she saved herself with the superpower she obtained after winning a daily task during the previous week.
- **^Note 9**: Sendrayan and Yashika were nominated as the best performers for their teams during the week-6 luxury budget task, and were saved from the following week's eviction.
- **^Note 10**: Although Vaishnavi was evicted through the public voting process, in accordance with the Secret Room twist she was moved to a separate room for four days before returning to the house on Day 46.
- **^Note 11**: As a result of Aishwarya's performance during the week-7 luxury budget task, Bigg Boss granted her immunity from nomination for the following week's eviction.
- **^Note 12**: Although Shariq was supposed to be the house captain during week 8, since he was evicted at the end of week 7 he chose Yashika as the week-8 captain.
- **^Note 13**: Janani was nominated for week-8 eviction by house captain Yashika, who had the power to nominate a housemate for eviction.
- **^Note 14**: Riythvika was nominated for week-9 eviction by house captain Aishwarya, who had the power to nominate a housemate for eviction.
- **^Note 15**: Balaji and Sendrayan were nominated as the worst performers for their teams during the week-9 luxury budget task, and were automatically nominated for the following week's eviction.
- **^Note 16**: Although Aishwarya was nominated for the week-10 eviction, she was saved by house captain Yashika (who had the power to save a nominated housemate from eviction).
- **^Note 17**: Vijayalakshmi was granted immunity from nominations for week 10 as the new entrant.
- **^Note 18**: Mahat was ejected from the show with a "red card" as he had physically assaulted co–housemates Daniel and Riythvika during the week 10 luxury budget task.
- **^Note 19**: Balaji, Daniel, Janani, and Riythvika were nominated as the worst performers of the week-10 luxury budget task, and were nominated for the week-11 eviction. Riythvika was granted immunity by Kamal Haasan for her honest opinions about her fellow housemates' strategy, however, during an interaction with Kamal a week earlier.
- **^Note 20**: Although Mahat was supposed to be the week-11 house captain, due to his ejection from the show, Kamal Haasan decided to nominate Sendrayan as the week-11 captain in accordance with the other housemates' wishes and because he had not been house captain.
- **^Note 21**: There was no nomination process during week 11. Balaji, Daniel, and Janani, who were nominated for eviction after being judged the worst performers of the previous week's luxury budget task, faced a public vote.
- **^Note 22**: Riythvika was nominated for the week-13 eviction after failing to persuade Mumtaz to perform the task assigned by the telephone caller.
- **^Note 23**: In week 13, the housemates had to decide who would be nominated for eviction. Since they could not reach a decision, house captain Riythvika nominated Vijayalakshmi, Aishwarya and Mumtaz.
- **^Note 24**: Janani had immunity until the final week, after winning the Ticket to Finale task.
- **^Note 25**: Balaji and Yashika were evicted in week 14.
- **^Note 26**: Except for Janani, the remaining housemates were nominated by Bigg Boss for the week-15 eviction.

== Reception ==
According to BARC India, the season had a TRP of 9.7 overall and 12.8 in Chennai alone, in its opening week in urban areas with 3.7 Crore viewers.
