= Pencil (film) =

2016 Indian Tamil mystery thriller film by Mani Nagaraj

- Theatrical release poster
- Directed by: Mani Nagaraj
- Written by: Mani Nagaraj
- Produced by: S. P. Ragavesh
- Starring: G. V. Prakash Kumar; Sri Divya; Shariq Hassan
- Cinematography: Gopi Amarnath
- Edited by: Anthony
- Music by: G. V. Prakash Kumar
- Production company: Kalsan Movies Pvt Ltd
- Distributed by: SVS Pictures; Kalasangham Films
- Release date: 13 May 2016
- Running time: 134 minutes
- Country: India
- Language: Tamil

Pencil is a 2016 Indian Tamil-language teen thriller film written and directed by debutant Mani Nagaraj. It is based on South Korean film 4th Period Mystery. The film stars G. V. Prakash Kumar and Sri Divya, with the former also composing the film's music. It was released on 13 May 2016, and received mixed reviews.

== Plot ==
Shiva is the best student at his school. His rival Nithin, the son of a leading film star and a spoiled brat, takes any and every opportunity to knock him down both verbally and physically, and the two are known enemies amongst the other students. Shiva doesn't find much happiness in school other than his classmate and love interest, Maya Srinivasan who later reciprocates his feelings after he saves her from a science lab accident.

One day, Nithin burns Shiva's thesis, and when Shiva finds out, he assaults Nithin in front of the whole school until the school management intervenes. Later, Shiva returns to his class to fight Nithin once again, but this time he finds him dead, with his neck stabbed repeatedly with a sharp pencil. Shiva removes the bloody pencil from Nithin's neck just as Maya shows up, catching him in a most incriminating position. Fortunately for him, she not only believes his innocence, but also offers to help him solve the mystery and catch the real killer – a task made particularly urgent by the fact that in 40 minutes, the rest of the class will return and then the body will be discovered.

The suspects are many: the school driver with whom Nithin has a fight over an open wall behind the school; a local goon who enters the school through the open wall to meet his girlfriend, only to be driven out by Nithin; the chemistry teacher Sridhar (Thirumurugan), whose romantic relationship with his colleague Nandhini (Suja Varunee) ends after Nithin secretly records an intimate video of the two and blackmails Nandhini with that video to do what he says and Nithin's ex-girlfriend Indhulekha (Shamily Sukumar), whose 8-year-old friend Divya is accidentally killed by Nithin when she tries to break up with him and is constantly harassed and blackmailed by Nithin not to report the murder to the school management or the police.

Maya and Shiva go on a wild goose chase to find out who the real killer is. Indhulekha and Shiva's friend, Napoleon helps to find the killer. It then turns out that Divya's father is the killer because he wanted revenge for his daughter's death. Maya and Shiva also seem to be together but a small verbal fight ensues between the two in the end.

== Cast ==
- G. V. Prakash Kumar as Shiva
- Sri Divya as Maya Srinivasan
- Shariq Hassan as Nithin
- Urvashi as Rajeshwari
- Giriprasad Damodar as Vicky
- T. P. Gajendran as Sudhanthiram
- VTV Ganesh as Anthony Gonsalves
- Abhishek Shankar as Sundarajaan
- Thirumurugan as K. Sridhar
- Suja Varunee as Nandhini
- Ravi Prakash as School Chairman
- Balaji Venugopal as Arun Kumar
- Arunraja Kamaraj as Selvaraj
- Yashika Aannand as Swimming Instructor
- Shamily Sukumar as Indhulekha
- Mirchi Shah as Napoleon
- Priya Mosh as Sowmya
- Sri Vidhya

== Production ==
In October 2013, it was announced that music composer G. V. Prakash Kumar would make his debut as an actor with director Mani Nagaraj's Pencil, a school based thriller film. The team initially approached Priya Anand to be the lead actress, who was unable to accept due to other commitments, and subsequently Sri Divya was recruited. Shariq Hassan, son of actors Riyaz Khan and Uma Riyaz was announced to make his acting debut with a supporting role. Mani Nagraj, who was a friend of Khan, offered the role of Nithin to Hassan, after seeing his photos on Facebook. Still photographs from the film's initial photo shoot were released to the media in November 2013, earning positive reaction from critics. It remains Mani Nagraj's only directorial credit before his death in 2022, as his second film, Vasuvin Garbinigal, never released.

== Soundtrack ==
G. V. Prakash Kumar composed the soundtrack. The album was released on 19 February 2015 in Suryan FM. Sify wrote, "Pencil is not an engaging album on the lines of Darling & is likely to work when viewed along with the visuals". Karthik of Milliblog wrote, "Familiar GV Prakash Kumar fare, barring minor highs like Kangalilae".

Pencil

Soundtrack album by G. V. Prakash Kumar
- Released: 2015
- Length: 39:16
- Language: Tamil
- Label: Think Music
- Producer: G. V. Prakash Kumar

G. V. Prakash Kumar chronology
| Ugly (2014) | Pencil (2015) | Rajathandhiram (2015) |

Track listing
| No. | Title | Lyrics | Singer(s) | Length |
|---|---|---|---|---|
| 1. | "Yaarai Polum Illa Neeyum" | Thamarai | G. V. Prakash Kumar | 5:20 |
| 2. | "Why Machi Why" | Arunraja Kamaraj | Tippu, V. Srihari, G. V. Prakash Kumar | 4:58 |
| 3. | "Kangalilae" | Thamarai | Shreya Ghoshal, Javed Ali, G. V. Prakash Kumar, Vandana Srinivasan | 5:14 |
| 4. | "LED Kannala" | Arunraja Kamaraj | Hariharasudhan, G. V. Prakash Kumar, Maalavika Sundar | 4:13 |
| 5. | "Yaarai Polum Illa Neeyum" (reprise) | Thamarai | EDM Mix | 4:24 |
| 6. | "Kangalilae Karaoke" | | — | 5:20 |
| 7. | "Yaarai Polum Illa Neeyum" (karaoke) | | — | 5:22 |
| 8. | "LED Kannala" (karaoke) | | — | 4:10 |
| Total length: | | | | 39:01 |

== Critical reception ==
Chennai Vision wrote, "GVP has done a good job as music director and his work is complemented well by Gopi Amarnath, the cinematographer. On the whole, Pencil is an engaging thriller but gets lengthy and preachy as it progresses". M. Suganth of The Times of India wrote, "Pencil could have been a thrilling whodunit but it also wants to be a message movie that rails against private educational institutions, and in trying to be both, it fails to be a satisfying film. And to make matters worse, its premise isn’t wholly original as well". IANS wrote that Pencil "could have been an excellent edge-of-the-seat campus thriller, provided the makers didn't try and commercialise it for the masses. Had they stuck to the template (sans a romantic track) that was followed in the original, this could've been a path-breaking film".

S Saraswathi of Rediff.com wrote, "At two hours 16 minutes, Pencil is an engaging thriller with an interesting plot and good performances. Definitely worth a watch". Baradwaj Rangan wrote for The Hindu, "the attempts at humour clash terribly with the whodunit tone. But the genre elements – red herrings, chases, lots of cross-cutting between concurrent events – make the movie vaguely watchable". Anupama Subramanian of Deccan Chronicle wrote, "While songs by GVP are distractions, BGM goes well with the mood of the film. Gopi Amarnath camera is brilliant and enhances the visuals. The movie is enjoyable in parts".
