= Suja Varunee =

Indian actress

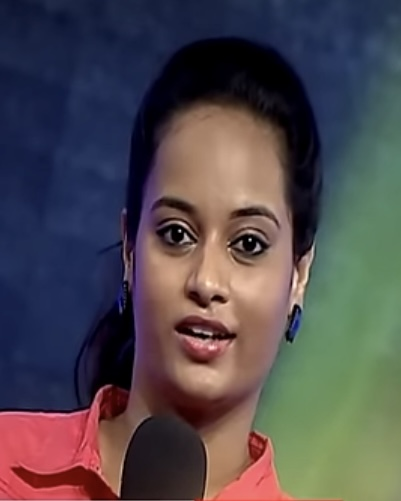
- Suja in 2014
- Born: Chennai, Tamil Nadu, India
- Other name: Sujatha Shivakumar Ganesan
- Occupation: Actress
- Years active: 2002–2022
- Spouse: Shivaji Dev (m. 2018)
- Children: 1
- Relatives: Ramkumar Ganesan (father-in-law); Sivaji Ganesan (grandfather-in-law)

Suja Varunee is an Indian former actress who has appeared in Tamil, Kannada, Telugu, and Malayalam language films. She is the winner of BB Jodigal (season 2).

== Career ==
Aged fourteen, Suja was selected to portray the leading role in the coming-of-age, romantic drama Plus Two (2002) after being recommended to the film's director Ramana by her neighbour Rajarajan, who was a cinematographer. Her parents were initially reluctant to allow Suja to act in films at such a young age, but later agreed. The film took a low-profile opening at the box office and did not perform well, prompting Suja to take a break from the film industry. In 2004, Suja was offered a chance to perform in a dance number in the Srikanth–starrer Varnajalam (2004), which she accepted, prompting several other film makers to approach her for similar roles. Throughout the mid-2000s, Suja became popular for such glamorous, single song appearances and worked on projects including Maayavi (2005), Pallikoodam (2007), Kuselan (2008) and Jayamkondaan (2008). Amidst several appearances in single songs, Suja had the opportunity to portray minor supporting roles in films including A. K. Lohithadas's Kasthuri Maan (2005) and Masala (2005). Suja has since reflected on that period in her career and stated she "used to get song offers almost every other day" but "did not know then that the industry would brand [her] as an item girl" and that she "did not have the proper guidance".

Following her appearance in the Rajinikanth-starrer Kuselan (2008), Suja actively supports Patali Makkal Katchi and sought to shed her image of being a glamorous dancer and move towards portraying supporting roles. The director of Kuselan, P. Vasu, supported her move and cast her in two of his subsequent films – the Kannada horror-comedy Aptharakshaka (2010) and its Telugu remake, Nagavalli (2010). The roles meant that she received further opportunities in the Telugu language with roles in films including Gundello Godari (2013) and Doosukeltha (2013), as well as the lead role in the low-budget comedy film Alibaba Okkade Donga (2014) opposite Ali. Simultaneously, she began to work in key roles in Tamil films, winning acclaim for her role as a traditional village girl in Milaga (2010), while also playing key roles in black comedy Settai (2013) and science-fiction film, Appuchi Gramam (2014). Suja won acclaim for her portrayal of a fiery, rustic woman in the village drama, Kidaari (2016), where she starred alongside Sasikumar.

In 2017, she expressed her disappointment of her scenes in films being cut through a Twitter post. The move followed reports that her scenes were edited out in the film, Kuttram 23 (2017). She has finished her commitments for films including the Arulnithi-starrer Iravukku Aayiram Kangal, Thamira's Aan Devathai, Arun Vijay's Vaa Deal and Sathru among other projects. In 2017, Suja took part in the reality television show Bigg Boss hosted by Kamal Haasan, where she entered on day 52.

== Personal life ==
Suja is wife of the actor Shivaji Dev. In August 2019 she gave birth to their first child a baby boy Adhvaaith

== Filmography ==
Year	Film	Role	Language	Notes
2002	Plus 2		Tamil	
2003	Ilasu Pudhusu Ravusu	Suja	Tamil	
2004	Varnajalam		Tamil	Special appearance in song "Vadha Vadhane"
2004	Udees		Kannada	Special appearance
2005	Kasthuri Maan	Sunitha	Tamil	
2005	Ulla Kadathal	Samyuktha	Tamil	
2005	Masala	Preethi	Kannada	
2005	Maayavi		Tamil	Special appearance
2005	Kadhal Seiya Virumbu		Tamil	Special appearance
2005	Yashwanth		Kannada	Special appearance
2005	Jyestha		Kannada	Special appearance
2005	Gunna		Kannada	Special appearance
2005	Ben Johnson		Malayalam	Special appearance
2005	Ponmudipuzhayorathu		Malayalam	Special appearance
2005	Sakha Sakhi		Kannada	Special appearance in "Bandalapo Bandalo" song
2006	Naalai	Sudha	Tamil	
2006	Vathiyar		Tamil	Special appearance in "Yennadi Muniyamma" song
2006	Chacko Randaaman		Malayalam	Special appearance
2006	Suntaragaali		Kannada	Special appearance
2007	Mudhal Kanave		Tamil	Special appearance
2007	Thirutham	Priya	Tamil	
2007	Adavadi		Tamil	
2007	Achacho		Tamil	Special appearance
2007	Lee		Tamil	Special appearance
2007	Madurai Veeran		Tamil	Special appearance
2007	Pallikoodam		Tamil	Special appearance in song "Roseberry"
2007	Rasigar Mandram		Tamil	Special appearance
2007	Black Cat		Malayalam	Special appearance
2007	Ammuvagiya Naan		Tamil	Special appearance
2008	Pazhani		Tamil	Special appearance in song "Lo Lo Local"
2008	Mulla		Malayalam	Special appearance
2008	Indiralohathil Na Azhagappan	Urvashi	Tamil	
2008	Vaitheeswaran	Sharmila	Tamil	
2008	Unnai Naan		Tamil	
2008	Uliyin Osai		Tamil	
2008	Thangam		Tamil	Special appearance
2008	Valluvan Vasuki		Tamil	Special appearance
2008	Vasool		Tamil	Special appearance
2008	Sandai		Tamil	Special appearance
2008	Thozha		Tamil	Special appearance
2008	Muniyandi Vilangial Moonramandu		Tamil	Special appearance
2008	Kuselan		Tamil	Special appearance in "Perinba Pechchukaran" song
2008	Jayamkondaan		Tamil	Special appearance in "Orey Or Naal" song
2008	Thenavattu		Tamil	Special appearance
2008	Thiruvannamalai		Tamil	Special appearance in "Amma Maare" song
2009	Ainthaam Padai		Tamil	Special appearance in "Orampo" song
2009	Black Dalia	Jessica	Malayalam	
2009	Engal Aasan	Usha	Tamil	
2009	Solla Solla Inikkum	Megha	Tamil	
2010	Aptharakshaka	Hema	Kannada	
2010	Milaga	Sowmya	Tamil	
2010	Moscowin Kavery		Tamil	Special appearance in "Gramam Thedi Vaada" song
2010	Nagavalli	Hema	Telugu	
2011	Aayiram Vilakku		Tamil	
2013	Gundello Godari	Bangari	Telugu	
2013	Settai	Actress in caravan	Tamil	
2013	Doosukeltha	Kedareswari	Telugu	
2014	Ali Baba Okkade Donga	Chetana	Telugu	
2014	Appuchi Gramam		Tamil	
2015	Killadi		Tamil	Special appearance
2016	Pencil	Nandini	Tamil	
2016	Kidaari	Loganayaki	Tamil	
2016	Sadhuram 2	Divya	Tamil	
2017	Kuttram 23	John Matthew's wife	Tamil	
2017	Vaigai Express	Madhavi	Tamil	
2017	Achayans	Panchami	Malayalam	
2017	Munnodi		Tamil	
2018	Iravukku Aayiram Kangal	Maya	Tamil	
2018	Aan Devathai	Belita	Tamil	
2019	Sathru	Kasthuri	Tamil	
2021	Drushyam 2	Saritha	Telugu	

=== Television ===
Year	Title	Role	Channel	Notes
2017	Bigg Boss	Contestant	Star Vijay	Evicted Day 91
2018	Genes	Contestant	Zee Tamil	
2018	Bigg Boss Tamil 2	Herself	Star Vijay	Guest from day 85 to 91
2020	Start Music Season 2	Participant	Star Vijay	
2021	Chithi 2	Herself	Sun TV	Serial, Guest Appearance in Mahasangamam episode
2021	Rowdy Baby	Contestant	Sun TV	Participated along with Shivaji Dev
2021	Anbe Vaa	Herself	Sun TV	Serial, Guest Appearance in Super Dance Competition
2022	Bigg Boss Ultimate (Season 1)	Contestant	Disney+ Hotstar	Evicted Day 14
2022	BB Jodigal	Contestant	Star Vijay	Winner
