= Shivaji Dev =

Indian actor

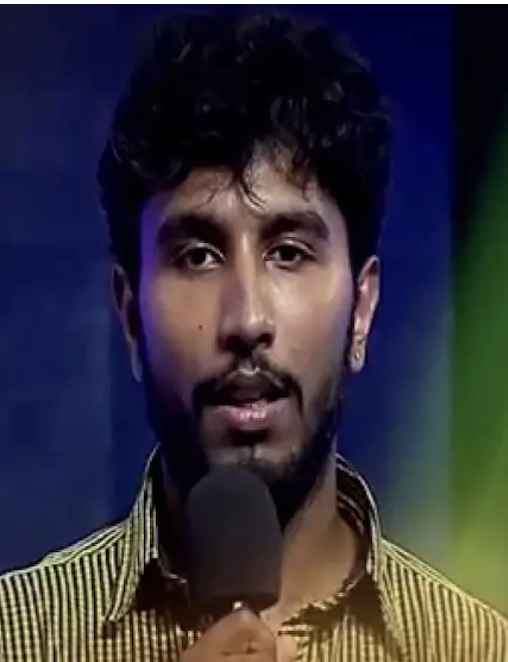
- Shivaji Dev in 2014
- Born: Shiva Kumar; 20 September 1989 (age 37); Chennai, Tamil Nadu, India
- Occupation: Actor
- Years active: 2008–2022; 2024
- Spouse: Suja Varunee
- Children: 1
- Father: Ramkumar Ganesan

Shiva Kumar (born 20 September 1989) also known as Shivaji Dev is an Indian actor working in Tamil language films, who made his debut in Venkatesh's Singakutty (2008). In 2024, he participated in the Indian reality show, Bigg Boss 8.

== Career ==
Shivaji Dev made his debut, credited as Junior Sivaji, in Venkatesh's masala film Singakutty (2008), starring alongside Gowri Munjal. The film opened to negative reviews from critics and fared poorly at the box office. In 2009 he joined Balu Mahendra's film institute and undertook a specialized acting course for a year and then started acting in theatrical plays. He garnered good reviews for his on-stage performances, including a role in The Importance of a Hat, where he played the role of an English butler, while also directing plays titled Merry Christmas and Growing up as a part of the Short & Sweet Theater Festival held in Chennai, India. He began work on another film Nandanam in mid 2012, featuring alongside Mithra Kurian and Rishi. However, despite completing schedules across Chennai, the film is yet to be complete and have a theatrical release. His second release was the coming-of-age film Pudhumugangal Thevai, where he played an aspiring film director. The film had a low key release in December 2012 and attracted negative reviews, though a critic noted Sivaji "shows potential".

In 2014, the actor was seen in AVM Productions' experimental drama film Idhuvum Kadandhu Pogum, where he played a widower. Having a straight to YouTube-release, the film attracted positive reviews from critics.

In 2024, he participated in the reality show Bigg Boss 8 as wildcard contestant. He was later evicted at 18th position from the show on Day 56.

== Personal life ==
His aunt is actress Sripriya, sister of his mother Meenakshi. He is married to actress Suja Varunee. In August 2019, Suja gave birth to their first child, a boy, named Adhvaaith.

== Filmography ==
Year	Film	Role	Notes
2008	Singakutty	Kathir	
2012	Pudhumugangal Thevai	Anand	
2014	Idhuvum Kadandhu Pogum	Gautham	

=== Television ===
Year	Title	Role	Channel	Notes
2022	BB Jodigal (season 2)	Contestant	Star Vijay	Winner
2024	Bigg Boss 8	Contestant	Star Vijay	Entered Day 28 Evicted Day 56

=== Web series ===
Year	Title	Role	Network
2019	Fingertip (season 1)	Vijay	Zee5
