= BB Jodigal =

Indian Tamil language reality show

- Genre: Reality dance show
- Presented by: Season 1 Erode Mahesh; Dheena; Season 2 Priyanka Deshpande; Raju Jeyamohan
- Judges: Ramya Krishnan (1-2); Nakkhul (1); Sathish Krishnan (2)
- Country of origin: India
- Original language: Tamil
- No. of seasons: 2
- No. of episodes: 33

Production
- Production location: Tamil Nadu
- Camera setup: Multi-camera
- Running time: 40-50 minutes

Original release
- Network: Star Vijay
- Release: 2 May 2021 – 4 September 2022

Bigg Boss: Jodigal is an Indian Tamil language reality television dance show, which premiered on 2 May 2021 and ended on 4 September 2022. It was broadcast on Star Vijay and streamed on JioHotstar. Over 2 years, BB Jodigal has rolled out 2 seasons.

== Series overview ==
Season	Episodes	Original broadcast		Winner	Prize
Season	Episodes	First aired	Last aired	Winner	Prize
1	16	2 May 2021	21 September 2021	Anitha Sampath and Shariq Hassan	₹ 3.00.000
2	17	8 May 2022	4 September 2022	Pavani Reddy and Amir & Suja Varunee and Shivaji Dev	-

== Season 1 ==
The first season aired on every Sunday from 2 May 2021 to 21 September 2021 and ended with 16 episodes. Ramya Krishnan and Nakkhul as the judges, television host Erode Mahesh and Dheena as the hosts. The winners of the season were Bigg Boss 4 contestant Anitha Sampath and Bigg Boss 2 contestant Shariq Hassan.

- Winners of Bigg Boss Jodigal : Anitha Sampath and Shariq Hassan
- Runner-up : Gabriella Charlton and Aajeedh Khalique and Jithan Ramesh and Samyuktha Shanmuganathan

=== Contestants ===
#	Jodigal	
1	Vanitha Vijayakumar; Bigg Boss 3	Suresh Chakravarthy; Bigg Boss 4
2	Shivani Narayanan; Bigg Boss 4 / Aishwarya Dutta; Bigg Boss 2	Som Shekar; Bigg Boss 4
3	Gabriella Charlton; Bigg Boss 4	Aajeedh Khalique; Bigg Boss 4
4	Aranthangi Nisha; Bigg Boss 4	Dhadi Balaji; Bigg Boss 2
5	Anitha Sampath; Bigg Boss 4	Shariq Hassan; Bigg Boss 2
6	Maria Juliana; Bigg Boss 1	Sendrayan; Bigg Boss 2
7	Samyuktha Shanmuganathan; Bigg Boss 4	Jithan Ramesh; Bigg Boss 4
8	Mohan Vaidya; Bigg Boss 3	Fathima Babu; Bigg Boss 3

==== Episodes ====
Episodes	Airing	Round	Notes
1	2 May 2021	Dance Wars: The Grand Launch	Shivani Narayanan Left the show.
2	9 May 2021	Power-packed Dancers	
3	20 June 2021	Village Theme Round	
4	27 June 2021	Dance, Duet and Lots of Drama	
5	4 July 2021	Monochrome Love Round	
6	11 July 2021	Love Battles	
7	18 July 2021	Demons Vs Angels	
8	25 July 2021	Good VS Evil	Vanitha Vijayakumar Left the show.
9	1 August 2021	Recreation Round	
10	8 August 2021	The Zone of Entertainment	
11	15 August 2021	Celebration Round	
12	22 August 2021	Story With a Dance Twist	
13	29 August 2021	Retro Round	
14	5 September 2021	Golden Ticket to the Finale	
15	15 September 2021	Kollywood One Movie Round	
16	19 September 2021	The Grand Finale	

== Season 2 ==
The second season aired on every Sunday at 19:30 from 8 May 2022 to 4 September 2022 and ended with 17 Episodes. Ramya Krishnan was again the judge along with new judge Sathish Krishnan. Priyanka Deshpande and Raju Jeyamohan as the hosts. The show witnessed three real life couples from Bigg Boss Tamil Contestants and five bigg boss Contestants couples engage in a 17-weeks dancing competition.

The winner of the season was Bigg Boss 5 Contestants Pavani Reddy & Amir and Bigg Boss 2 Contestant Suja Varunee and her Husband Shivaji Dev.

- Winners of Bigg Boss Jodigal : Pavani Reddy & Amir and Suja Varunee and Shivaji Dev.
- Runner-up : Abishek Raaja and Nadia Chang

=== Final results ===
Jodigal	Places	Status
Amir & Pavni	1st	Winner
Suja Varunee & Shiva	1st	Winner
VJ Abhishek & Nadia Chang	2nd	1st Runner-up
Aarthi & Ganesh	3rd	3rd Runner-up
Thamarai Selvi & Parthasarathy	4th	Evicted
Ikky Berry & Dev	5th	Evicted
Isaivani & Velmurugan	6th	Evicted
Daniel & Ramya NSK	7th	Evicted

=== Contestants ===
#	Jodigal	
1	Pavani Reddy; Bigg Boss 5	Amir; Bigg Boss 5
2	Abishek Raaja; Bigg Boss 5	Suruthi Periyasamy; Bigg Boss 5 / Nadia Chang; Bigg Boss 5
3	Iykki Berry; Bigg Boss 4	Dev
4	Daniel Annie Pope; Bigg Boss 2	Ramya NSK; Bigg Boss 2
5	Suja Varunee; Bigg Boss 1	Shivaji Dev; Bigg Boss 8
6	Aarthi; Bigg Boss 1	Ganeshkar
7	Thamarai Selvi; Bigg Boss 5	Parthasarathy
8	Isaivani; Bigg Boss 5	Velmurugan; Bigg Boss 4

==== Episodes ====
Episodes	Airing	Round	Notes
1	8 May 2022	A Power-packed Beginning	
2	15 May 2022	Energetic Performances	K. S. Ravikumar, Tharshan Thiyagarajah, Losliya Mariyanesan and the Google Kuttappa movie crew grace the show!
3	22 May 2022	Village Theme Round	
4	29 May 2022	City vs Village Round	
5	5 June 2022	Ulganayakan Special	Kamal Haasan join the show.
6	12 June 2022	Kollywood Super Star Round	
7	19 June 2022	Angels vs Demons Round	
8	3 July 2022	The Elimination Round	
9	10 July 2022	Retro vs Black and White	
10	17 July 2022	Janani Graces the Show	Janani and Aishwarya Dutta join the show.
11	24 July 2022	Romance Round	
12	31 July 2022	Elimination Time	
13	7 August 2022	A Contest to Remember	
14	14 August 2022	Wedding Round	
15	21 August 2022	Enacting Iconic Movie Couples	
16	28 August 2022	Power-packed Performances	
17	4 September 2022	The Grand Finale	Brahmāstra: Part One – Shiva cast graces the stage with their presence. (Ranbir Kapoor, Nagarjuna Akkineni, S. S. Rajamouli)

== Adaptations ==
Language	Title	Original release	Network(s)	Last aired	Notes
Tamil	BB Jodigal	2 May 2021	Star Vijay	4 September 2022	Original
Telugu	BB Jodi	13 February 2022	Star Maa	29 March 2026	Remake
