= Kousalya Supraja Rama =

Kousalya Supraja Rama is the first line of Suprabhatam.

Kousalya Supraja Rama may also refer to:

- Kousalya Supraja Rama (2008 film)
- Kousalya Supraja Rama (2023 film)
