= Vaitheeswaran =

2008 film

- Title card
- Directed by: R. K. Vidyadharan
- Written by: R. K. Vidyadharan
- Produced by: Senthilkumar; Ganesh
- Starring: R. Sarathkumar; Meghna Naidu; Pooja Gandhi
- Cinematography: S. Saravanan; M. V. Panneerselvam
- Edited by: A. Sheikh Mohammed
- Music by: Srikanth Deva
- Production company: Annamalai Creations
- Distributed by: Pyramid Saimira
- Release date: 14 March 2008
- Country: India
- Language: Tamil

Vaitheeswaran (Note: Spelt onscreen as Vaithisvarran.) is a 2008 Indian Tamil-language supernatural action film written and directed by R. K. Vidyadharan in his debut. It stars R. Sarathkumar, Meghna Naidu and Pooja Gandhi, while Sayaji Shinde, Riyaz Khan, Vijayakumar, Santhanam, and Vinaya Prasad play supporting roles. The music was composed by Srikanth Deva, and the film was released on 14 March 2008.

== Plot ==
When a young boy Saravanan is killed by rowdy and aspiring politician Dhanasekaran, his distraught mother is ready to kill herself. She is stopped by Mani Shankar, who promises her that her son will be reincarnated and meet her in 30 years. The only condition is that the mother must remain inside Vaitheeswaran temple, praying to be reunited with her son. 30 years later, her wait catches the attention of the public, who are curious to see if Saravanan shows up. Dr. Bala, who has no belief in reincarnation, wishes to treat her, while Dhanasekharan, who is now a politician and eyeing the CM seat, knows that Saravanan's arrival could derail his plans. Armed with a computer-generated photo of how Saravanan would look like now, Dhanasekharan and Bala go looking for him, when Bala realises that he is indeed the reincarnation of Saravanan. What happens next forms the climax of the story.

== Cast ==
- R. Sarathkumar as Saravanan / Dr. Bala
- Meghna Naidu as Roopa
- Pooja Gandhi as Sanjana
- Sayaji Shinde as Dhanasekaran
- Riyaz Khan as Inspector Chandru
- Vijayakumar as Mani Shankar
- Santhanam as Madan
- Vinaya Prasad as Saravanan's mother
- Suja Varunee as Dr. Sharmila
- Delhi Ganesh
- Mayilsamy
- Manobala as Dhanasekaran's henchman
- Chitra Lakshmanan as Dhanasekaran's henchman
- I. S. Rajesh as Kasi
- Thyagu
- Poovilangu Mohan
- Ponnambalam
- Mohan Raman
- Mahanadi Shankar
- Balu Anand
- Vijay Krishnaraj
- John Amirtharaj

== Production ==
The film began production in 2007.

== Soundtrack ==
The soundtrack was composed by Srikanth Deva. Saraswathy Srinivas of Rediff wrote, "Vaitheeswaran album with just three tracks plus one repetition sticks to the adage 'small is beautiful'. Sreekanth Deva's music is pleasing to the ear".

Song	Singers	Lyrics
"Engirundho Varuva"	Mano	Vidhyadharan
"Kangaley Thoongathey"	Vijay Yesudas	Theraviam
"Kangalum Thoongathey"	S. P. Balasubrahmanyam	Thamarai
"Mudhal Mudhal"	P. Unnikrishnan, Sujatha	Thamarai

== Critical reception ==
Sify wrote, "The trouble with Vaitheeswaran is that it is predictable, story is stale and there are no twists in the tale". Pavithra Srinivasan of Rediff wrote, "Everything is connected'. That's the tagline of Annamalai Production's latest, Tamil film Vaitheeswaran starring action star Sarathkumar, and directed by R K Vidhayadharan. You only wish the team had managed to connect the screenplay, acting and plot all together!". Malathi Rangarajan of The Hindu wrote, "The theme by itself is fine. It's the treatment that gets suffocating after a point", concluding, "Beginning on an esoteric plane Vaitheeswaran soon crash-lands on a meandering terrain of myths, miracles and implausible occurrences".
