= Gandana Mane =

- VCD cover
- Directed by: S. Mahendar
- Written by: B A Madhu
- Produced by: R. S. Gowda
- Starring: Shiva Rajkumar; Gowri Munjal
- Cinematography: Sundarnath Suvarna
- Edited by: Nagendra Urs
- Music by: V. Manohar
- Release date: August 20, 2007
- Country: India
- Language: Kannada

Gandana Mane is a 2007 Kannada movie directed by S. Mahendar and starring Shiva Rajkumar and Gowri Munjal.

== Cast ==
- Shiva Rajkumar as Raja
- Gowri Munjal as Priya
- Hema Chaudhary
- Avinash as Sitaram
- Doddanna
- Ashalatha as Raja's step-mother
- Ramesh Bhat
- Karibasavaiah
- Tennis Krishna
- Vaijanath Biradar

== Soundtrack ==
Gandana Mane

Soundtrack album by V. Manohar
- Released: Jun 3, 2007
- Recorded: 2007
- Genre: Soundtrack
- Length: 36:01
- Label: Anand Audio
- Producer: V. Manohar

V. Manohar chronology
Duniya (2007)	Gandana Mane (2007)	Operation Ankusha (2007)

The music was composed by V. Manohar and released by Anand Audio Video.

Track list
No.	Title	Lyrics	Singer(s)	Length
1.	"Kuhu Kuhu Kogile"	S. Mahendar	Udit Narayan	4:46
2.	"Mayagara Manasa"	V. Manohar	Nanditha	4:38
3.	"Oho Gandana Mane (Female)"	V. Manohar	Nanditha	5:35
4.	"Karunada Kannadiga"	S. Mahendar	Shiva Rajkumar	4:50
5.	"Jane Janera Sobana"	V. Manohar	Hemanth	5:47
6.	"Oho Gandana Mane (Male)"	V. Manohar	Ramesh Chandra	5:35
7.	"Jaagi Mallige"	V. Manohar	Udit Narayan, Mangala Ravi	4:50
Total length:				36:01

== Reception ==
A critic from The Times of India wrote that "It is a treat to watch Shivaraj Kumar's brilliant acting. Gauri is excellent and Avinash is in fine form. B A Madhu's dialogues and camerawork by Sundarnath Suvarna are added attractions. V Manohar's music is pleasant". A critic from Rediff.com opined that "All in all, an ordinary fare".
