= Netru Indha Neram =

Indian Tamil-language mystery thriller film

- Directed by: Sai Roshan K.R
- Written by: Sai Roshan K.R
- Produced by: K.R. Naveen Kumar
- Starring: Shariq Hassan; Haritha
- Cinematography: Vishal Manivannan
- Edited by: Govindh.N
- Music by: Kevin N
- Production company: Clapin Filmotainment
- Distributed by: Uthraa Productions
- Release date: 29 March 2024
- Country: India
- Language: Tamil

Netru Indha Neram (transl. This time yesterday) is a 2024 Indian Tamil-language mystery thriller film written and directed by Sai Roshan K.R. The film stars Shariq Hassan and Haritha. The film was produced by K.R. Naveen Kumar under the banner of Clapin Filmotainment.

== Cast ==
- Shariq Hassan as Nikhil
- Haritha as Rithika
- Monica Ramesh as Shreya
- Kaviya Amira as Nithya
- Divakar Kumar as Rohit
- Nithin Aaditya as Aaditya
- Aravindh Raghunathan as Hrithik
- Anand Raj as Velraj
- Bala Murugan P.A. as Radhakrishnan
- Arul Selva as Vinay
- K. R. Naveen Kumar as Raja
- J. Ramesh as Watchman
- Karthik as Estate Worker

== Production ==
The film was shot in Ooty and Chennai.

== Reception ==
Roopa Radhakrishnan of The Times of India rated the film 2 out of 5 stars and stated that "Throughout its runtime, the film wants us to be suspicious of each person in the friend group. We see what took place from the perspective of each of the characters as they narrate their version of what happened to the investigators."

The Hindu Tamil Thisai critic wrote: "This film is an example of how a compelling story and a strong screenplay can give an interesting 'murder mystery' film with new faces." and gave 2.5 out of 5 star

The Maalai Malar critic gave a mixed review.
