= Singakutty =

- DVD cover
- Directed by: A. Venkatesh
- Written by: A. Venkatesh
- Produced by: Girija Swamy; Meenakshi Ramkumar; Chanddarkanth
- Starring: Shivaji Dev; Gowri Munjal; Vivek
- Cinematography: R. D. Rajasekhar
- Edited by: Anthony
- Music by: Prasanna Shekhar
- Production company: Tamil Screens
- Release date: 21 March 2008
- Running time: 150 minutes
- Country: India
- Language: Tamil

Singakutty (transl. Lion Cub) is a 2008 Indian Tamil-language action film written and directed by A. Venkatesh, starring Shivaji Dev (in his career debut) and Gowri Munjal. The film was released on 21 March 2008, and did not perform well at the box office.

== Plot ==
Kadhir, a fearless young man, helps the police department nab a notorious criminal in Chennai. He was selected as an SI and finished his training in Chennai. On the way to his hometown, he thinks about his past.

A few years before, Kadhir was a happy-go-lucky youngster wandering with his friends and juice shop owner Paulraj. Paul was an intense fan of actress Malavika, running his juice shop by naming her. So Kadhir and his friend use this and deceive money from him by showing a photo-shopped picture of Malavika standing with him. Meanwhile, Kadhir comes across Anjali, a college final-year student and the daughter of a big entrepreneur in Madurai. Soon they became lovers, and their parents accepted this.

Back to the present, Kadhir arrives at the Madurai bus stand. He receives a phone call from a mobile in his bag, which was hidden inside. An unknown man states that he had kidnapped Kadhir's mother, sister, and lover and sent a photo proof of them tied in a secret place. The strange man threatens Kadhir on the phone that he will kill his family if he goes to the police or asks for help from somebody. Kadhir, realising he is under surveillance and understands that he cannot escape, pleaded with him not to harm anyone. The man orders Kadhir to do a favour, and tells him he will release his family once he finishes the work. Kadhir was told to come to a certain place only to see the amputated ring finger of his lover, Anjali. Disheartened to see this, Kadhir agrees to do the work for his family's sake.

The deal is that the man wants to place an explosive bomb at a certain temple, which was given to him. Attempts failed when Kadhir alerts his friends through an SOS message in a cigarette packet. He got beat up by thugs for trying to alert his friends. It is revealed to Kadhir that the mysterious man himself is the elder brother of the guy whom Kadhir had handed over to the cops. By then, only Kadhir understood the situation that he was a terrorist; it was a trap for him to fulfill his goal of an explosion and his brother's revenge. So Kadhir placed the bomb at the temple between lakhs of people, as advised. Though he placed the bomb, he refused to go back, thinking the explosion would have a brutal effect. Anticipating Kadhir would refuse to step back, the man planted another bomb in a handbag and gave it to Kadhir's mother, dropped her in a mid-street, and released the other two. When both bombs are about to explode in twenty minutes, technically, Kadhir can only save either the people or his mother. So he initially went to save his mother and started searching in the streets.

Parallel narration is the comedy track of the juice shop owner Paul, confusing Kadhir and his mother who is with the hand bag.

Time is running out, Kadhir reaches the temple to defuse the bomb and save lakhs of people, instead of his mother. He identified the bomb bag that he had left, and took the bomb, ran to the upstairs of the temple. With only ten seconds left for the explosion, he throws it towards the sky, using his discus throw technique, which he practised. The bomb exploded and nobody was harmed since it travelled a safe radial distance by Kadhir's throw. Kadhir and his family were united, and he received appreciation from the city commissioner and the media.

== Cast ==
- Shivaji Dev as Kathir
- Gowri Munjal as Anjali
- Vivek as Paulraj
- Saranya as Kathir's mother
- Avinash as Anjali's father
- Thalaivasal Vijay as DGP
- Malavika as herself (special appearance)
- Anal Arasu as Muthu Pandi
- Srinath as Kathir's friend
- Cell Murugan as a police inspector
- Kumaresan as Rowdy

Uncredited

- Vinayakan as Gumban
- Kovai Senthil as a passerby

== Soundtrack ==
The soundtrack was composed by Prasanna Shekhar, in his debut. It includes a remix of "Aattama Therottama", composed by Ilaiyaraaja for Captain Prabhakaran (1991). The audio was launched on 11 February 2008.

Track listing
No.	Title	Singer(s)	Length
1.	"Machi Suththungada"	Karthik, Farhad Bhiwandiwala
2.	"Chicago Chickene"	Karthik, Shalini Singh, Farhad Bhiwandiwala
3.	"Yenda Ratchasa"	Janaki Iyer
4.	"Thithikkum Thiyedhu"	Farhad Bhiwandiwala
5.	"Aattama Therottama"	Anuradha Sriram, DJ Ewan

== Release ==
Singakutty was initially scheduled to release on 14 March 2008, but was instead released a week later on 21 March, Good Friday. Moser Baer released the film via home video in June 2009.

== Reception ==
Sify wrote, "To put it politely, A.Venkatesh's story and presentation falls flat as he has tried to introduce a raw newcomer as a larger-than-life hero which is hard to stomach and quite irritating." Pavithra Srinivasan of Rediff.com wrote, "Venkatesh's screenplay has the right mix, even if the item and romantic songs prove a headache in their placement. Well aware of what a new hero's launch vehicle should be, he has set out to provide a good fare which satisfies everyone's appetite." Cinesouth wrote, "Director A Venkatesh atones for the first boring half of the film with better second half", calling the first half a "cat" and the second half a "tiger".
