= Ugly (soundtrack) =

- Soundtrack cover

Soundtrack album by G. V. Prakash Kumar
- Released: 24 November 2014
- Recorded: 2014
- Genre: Feature film soundtrack
- Length: 19:56
- Language: Hindi
- Label: Zee Music Company
- Producer: G. V. Prakash Kumar

G. V. Prakash Kumar chronology
Darling (2014)	Ugly (2014)	Pencil (2015)

Ugly is the soundtrack album to the 2014 film of the same name directed by Anurag Kashyap and starred Rahul Bhat, Ronit Roy, Tejaswini Kolhapure, Vineet Kumar Singh, Girish Kulkarni, Surveen Chawla and Anshika Shrivastava. The album featured five songs composed by G. V. Prakash Kumar with lyrics written by Gaurav Solanki and Vineet Kumar. The soundtrack was released under the Zee Music Company label on 24 November 2014.

== Background ==
G. V. Prakash Kumar composed the soundtrack to Ugly, collaborating with Kashyap once again after scoring the background music for the two-part film Gangs of Wasseypur (2012) and also his fourth Hindi film after the Gangs of Wasseypur series and Joker (2012). Gaurav Solanki wrote the lyrics for four of the songs, while the title track was written by Vineet Kumar. Prakash made his Bollywood singing debut, performing the track "Suraj Hai Kahan" which was a mix of trance and dubstep. Other artists who performed the songs include, Shilpa Rao, Singh, Ishq Bector, Christopher Stanley, Barkha Swaroop Saxena and Shree D. Brian McOmber provided the background score. The soundtrack was released under the Zee Music Company label on 24 November 2014.

== Reception ==
Karthik Srinivasan of Milliblog wrote "GVP's Hindi debut was a joke(r); this one thankfully doesn't symbolize the title. It is ordinary, though." Joginder Tuteja of Bollywood Hungama described the music "outstanding" and summarized "The usage of Rock music in key sequences is simply fascinating. The song 'Papa' sung by Shilpa Rao will leave you with a lump in the throat and moist eyes." According to a critic from Sify, the song "Nichod De" mocked the item numbers and their corny music and lyrics. Sonia Chopra described the music "consistently foreboding". Mihir Fadnavis of Firstpost complimented "the spine-chilling rock music-inspired background score [...] this sort of sound design hasn't been heard in Bollywood and it really is quite refreshing." Devesh Sharma of Filmfare mentioned that the contributions of Prakash and McOmber "are no less than artful masterstrokes".

== Track listing ==
No.	Title	Lyrics	Singer(s)	Length
1.	"Suraj Hai Kahan"	Gaurav Solanki	G. V. Prakash Kumar	5:16
2.	"Papa"	Gaurav Solanki	Shilpa Rao	3:16
3.	"Nichod De"	Gaurav Solanki	Barkha Swaroop Saxena	4:03
4.	"Money"	Gaurav Solanki	Christopher Stanley	3:42
5.	"Ugly"	Vineet Kumar Singh	Ishq Bector, Vineet Kumar Singh, Shree D	3:39
Total length:				19:56
