= Shadow Man (2014 film) =

- Directed by: Majo Mathew
- Produced by: K. M. Sebastian
- Starring: [[Riyaz Khan], [Pratheesh Kumar]]
- Cinematography: Santhosh Manappally
- Edited by: Renjith
- Music by: Benny Johnson
- Release date: 15 August 2014
- Running time: 75 minutes
- Country: India
- Language: Malayalam

Shadow Man (Malayalam: ഷാഡോ മാൻ) is a Malayalam suspense thriller film directed by Majo C. Mathew. The only character in the film is played by Riyaz Khan.

== Plot ==
Surya is a real estate agent. One day gets trapped in a site where he goes to look for his boss. There a shadow begins following him...

== Cast ==
- Riyaz Khan as Surya
