= Munna Simon =

Indian actor

- Born: 1 May 1979 (age 47); Chennai, Tamil Nadu, India
- Occupations: Actor; Physiotherapist
- Years active: 2003-present
- Spouse: Betty Mary (m. 2010)

Munna Simon is an Indian actor, who has notably appeared in Malayalam and Tamil films. He has acted in Gaurisankaram, Silandhi, Kandein Kadhalai and Raavanan.

== Career ==
His initial films such as Pallavan, Jananam and Unnai Enakku Pudichirukku were highly unsuccessful films as they failed to create any impact at the box office. He eventually gained attention with the 2008 low-budget thriller Silandhi, following it up with the successful Kandein Kadhalai, appearing alongside Bharath and Tamannaah Bhatia. Subsequently, he was signed by Indian director Mani Ratnam to enact a supporting role in his magnum opus Raavanan, along with prominent film artists Vikram, Aishwarya Rai, Prithviraj and Priyamani.

== Personal life ==
Munna is the nephew of Malayalam actress Jayabharathi. He graduated from U.C College and further studied physiotherapy in the School of Medical education Angamaly. Munna's only brother Dominic Simon died of Pneumonia on 20 May 2013. Dominic was doing M.Sc. in visual communications in SRM College Chennai.

== Filmography ==
Year	Title	Role	Language	Notes
2003	Pallavan	Manohar	Tamil	credited as Shankar
2003	Gaurisankaram	Sankaran	Malayalam	
2004	Jananam	Sasi	Tamil	
2005	Unnai Enakku Pudichirukku	Himself	Tamil	
2007	Aata	Vicky	Telugu	
2008	Silandhi	Mahesh	Tamil	
2009	Kandein Kadhalai	Gautham	Tamil	
2010	Raavanan	Sakkarai	Tamil	
2011	Mohabbath	Ameer	Malayalam	
2012	Banking Hours 10 to 4	Rahul	Malayalam	
2013	Kutteem Kolum	Babu	Malayalam	
2014	To Noora with Love	Himself	Malayalam	
2014	Testpaper		Malayalam	
2015	Achaaram	Siva	Tamil	
2019	Enai Noki Paayum Thota	Anand Bhai	Tamil	
2019	Queen	Srikanth	Tamil	Web Series
2020	Kannan Aayal	Kannan	Malayalam	Music album
2023	Lockdown Diarie		Tamil	
2023	Dhruva Natchathiram		Tamil	Unreleased
2025	Madha Gaja Raja	Viswanath's henchman	Tamil	
