= Rajesh Yadav (cinematographer) =

Indian cinematographer

- Born: Tamil Nadu, India, 1972
- Occupations: Cinematographer; Director of Photography
- Years active: 2003–present

Rajesh Yadav is an Indian cinematographer who works in Tamil, Telugu, Kannada, Malayalam, and Hindi film industry.

== Career ==
Rajesh initially wanted to join SSI at Guindy for photography but since he could not get admission there he instead joined acting course at Taramani institute in spite of joining acting course he went only at cinematography department.

He won Special Jury Award for Best cinematography (Pokkisham) in 7th Chennai International Film Festival. Regarding his work in Pudhumugangal Thevai (2012), a critic wrote that "Rajesh Yadav is a revelation. Considering this is his debut as an actor, he has given an impressive performance. His cinematography, along with Saravanan, shines."

== Filmography ==
Year	Film	Language	Notes
2003	Ee Abbai Chala Manchodu	Telugu	
2003	Unnai Charanadaindhen	Tamil	
2004	Ramakrishna	Tamil	
2005	Mazhai	Tamil	
2007	Lee	Tamil	
2008	Raman Thediya Seethai	Tamil	
2009	Pokkisham	Tamil	7th Chennai International Film Festival Special Jury Award for Best Cinematography Kalaignar TV Award for Best Cinematography
2010	Vandae Maatharam	Tamil & Malayalam	
2012	Pudhumugangal Thevai	Tamil	Also actor
2013	Sillunu Oru Sandhippu	Tamil	
2015	Thilagar	Tamil	
2015	Aavi Kumar	Tamil	
2016	Ranatantra	Kannada	
2016	Chennai 600028 II: Second Innings	Tamil	
2018	Kismath	Kannada	
2019	Voter	Telugu	
2019	Thirumanam	Tamil	
2020	Live Telecast	Tamil	Television series on Disney+Hotstar
2023	Tamil Kudimagan	Tamil	
2023	Kuiko	Tamil	
2025	Dinasari	Tamil	
TBA	Party	Tamil	Unreleased
