= Silandhi =

- Poster
- Directed by: Aathiraj
- Written by: Aathiraj
- Produced by: Sankar
- Starring: Munna; Monica; Riyaz Khan
- Cinematography: Fowzia Fathima
- Edited by: Satish Kurusova
- Music by: Neil Mukherji
- Production company: G Company
- Release date: 9 May 2008
- Country: India
- Language: Tamil

Silandhi (transl. Spider) is a 2008 Indian Tamil-language erotic thriller film directed by debutant Aathiraj. The film stars Munna and Monica in lead roles with Riyaz Khan in a supporting role. It revolves around a newlywed couple who go to an isolated villa for their honeymoon, where unnatural things start to happen.

Silandhi was released on 9 May 2008. The film was inspired by I Know What You Did Last Summer, and became a box office success. The director remade the film in Kannada as Ranatantra (2014).

== Plot ==
The story begins with Monica who is on the run with fear that death is looming over her and a young man saves her from the trouble. Slowly, he starts building confidence in her and in this process both of them begin getting close to each other. Love happens and they get married, time for honeymoon and they set off to a remote bungalow in Pondicherry for their special moments. But things take a twist there since Monica senses that she is being followed by someone and from then on starts a trail of terror and fear that makes her life miserable. That is the time truth comes out that sometime back her three friends who earn a lot of money get used to an extravagant lifestyle and lose their humanity with pride and arrogance. In this process, they come across an innocent LIC policy agent who is ragged and raped to the core by these three friends. In this confusion, the agent is injured and he dies due to the injuries. Monica who is with the gang does not involve in the ghastly happening but then helps them clear the dead body. Soon, each one of them starts dying and it now appears that the agent is still alive and is out for Monica's blood.

== Cast ==
- Munna as Mahesh
- Monica as Monika
- Riyaz Khan as the police officer
- Chandru as the LIC policy agent
- Reshma
- Abhay
- Neelima Rani
- Nellai Siva as a vegetable shop owner
- Ganesh Babu
- Jaisurya
- Ramya
- Nayana
- Raghu
- Kumaran
- Ramesh
- Anandh
- Valamuni

== Reception ==
Divya Kumar of The Hindu wrote, "It starts out looking like amateur soft-porn, takes a detour into B-grade horror film territory and ends with a heavy-handed message about the depravity of the modern Indian woman. Aathiraj gets very little right in his directorial debut Silandhi, and that's putting it mildly". Sify reviewed the film more positively, praising the cinematography, editing and background score but criticising the "wafer thin" script. Santhi of Kalki praised the performances of the lead pair along with the cinematography and music.

== Potential successors ==
A successor titled Silandhi 2, also to be directed by Aathiraj, was announced in 2017 but was not intended to be a sequel to the first film; it did not materialise. In May 2026, he reannounced Silandhi 2, saying it would be produced in six languages: Tamil, Telugu, Hindi, Kannada, Malayalam and Bengali.
