= Aishwarya Dutta =

Indian actress

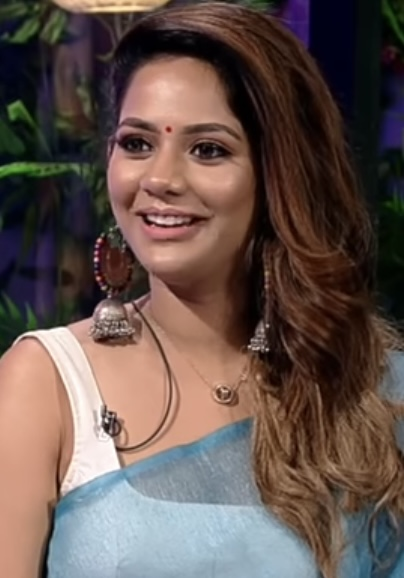
- Born: Kolkata, India
- Occupation: Actress
- Years active: 2015–present

Aishwarya Dutta is an Indian actress who has predominantly appeared in Tamil language films. After initially appearing in music videos and minor acting roles, she made a breakthrough as an actress with her role in the Tamil movie Tamizhuku En Ondrai Azhuthavum (2015). In 2018, she featured in the Tamil reality television show Bigg Boss Tamil 2 and emerged as the runner up.

== Career ==
Aishwarya Dutta began her career as a dancer with the Nrithyangan Sisters troupe, appearing in several stage performances and reality shows. She then got into modelling, and notably appeared in commercials and a music video with playback singer Harshad Saxena for Sony Music Videos. As an actress, Dutta first appeared in the bilingual murder mystery film, Picnic, about a group of students who go to Vizag for an excursion with their professor. Shot in Bengali and Hindi, the film became noticed for the intimate scenes between the lead actresses.

Dutta made her debut in the Tamil film industry with Ramprakash Rayappa's Tamizhuku En Ondrai Azhuthavum (2015), which opened to positive reviews and box office collections. In the film, Aishwarya portrayed a middle-class college student who falls for an intelligent youngster, played by Nakul. She was later listed by the Times of India as one of the best debutants of 2015, alongside the likes of Amyra Dastur and Keerthy Suresh. Soon after the release of the film, she stated that the Tamil film industry was her "favourite" and that the scripts being offered to her in Tamil were "solid", and raised her confidence level considerably. She then featured in a supporting role as Kajal Aggarwal's sister in Suseenthiran's action thriller, Paayum Puli (2015), and described that the opportunity to work in a high-profile project was "rewarding". During the period, she also worked on a film titled Aruthapathi with Vidharth as her co-star, and Sattam opposite Samuthirakani, but the projects were later shelved.

She next appeared as a journalist in Arivazhagan's mystery film Aarathu Sinam (2016), featuring alongside Arulnithi and Aishwarya Rajesh. The film won positive reviews from critics, though received an average response commercially. In her next role, she portrayed a "free-spirited girl" and paired opposite Kavin in S. R. Prabhakaran's action drama Sathriyan, which starred Vikram Prabhu and Manjima Mohan. In 2018, her only release was the action drama Marainthirunthu Paarkum Marmam Enna, which she had shot for in 2015. During the making of the film, she fell out with the producers who subsequently decided to reduce the scope of her character.

In 2018, she featured in the Tamil reality television show Bigg Boss Tamil 2, and finished as the season's runner-up. Recently, she showcased her talent and versatility by competing in Top Cooku Dupe Cooku, further solidifying her popularity in the entertainment industry.

== Filmography ==
- All films are in Tamil, unless otherwise noted.

†	Denotes films that have not yet been released

=== Films ===
Year	Film	Role	Notes
2014	Chalo Picnic Manayen		Bilingual film in Bengali (as Picnic) and Hindi
2015	Tamizhuku En Ondrai Azhuthavum	Harini	
2015	Paayum Puli	Dhivya	
2015	Achaaram	Nandhini	Guest appearance
2016	Aarathu Sinam	Varsha	
2017	Sathriyan	Chandran's girlfriend	
2018	Marainthirunthu Paarkum Marmam Enna	Bharathi	
2022	Coffee with Kadhal	Neetu	
2022	Jasper	Seema	
2023	Irumban	Mahima	
2023	Kannitheevu	Aishwarya	
2023	Farhana	Sofia	
2024	Hit List	Aishwarya	
2024	Kozhipannai Chelladurai	Chitra	
2024	Hitler	Dancer	Special appearance
2025	Madraskaaran	Kalyani	
2026	Mustafa Mustafa	Honey	
2026	Vishwanath & Sons	Maddy's friend	

=== Television ===
Year	Shows	Role	Channel	Notes
2018	Bigg Boss Tamil Season 2	Contestant	Vijay TV	1st Runner Up
2019	Bigg Boss Tamil Season 3	Guest	Vijay TV	
2020	Murattu Singles	Guest	Vijay TV	
2020	Bigg Boss Tamil Season 4	Guest	Vijay TV	Through Virtual Meet
2021	BB Jodigal Season 1	Contestant	Vijay TV	Reality Dance Show; Finalist
2021	Chat Box With Ashiq	Guest	Sun Music	Talk Show
2022	Stylish Tamilachi: Pongal Special Show	Guest	Star Vijay	Pongal Special Show
2022	Oo Solriya Oo Oohm Solriya	Participant	Star Vijay	Game Show
2022	Anda Ka Kasam	Participant	Star Vijay	Game Show
2023	Cooku with Comali (season 4)	Guest	Star Vijay	Special appearance
2024	Top Cooku Dupe Cooku (season 1)	Contestant	Sun TV	Eliminated episode 16

=== Web series ===
Year	Title	Role	Platform	Notes
2019	Madras Meter Show	Guest	ZEE5	Episode 4
2024	Sshhh	Tarangani	aha	Anthology series; segment Kamathupaal

=== Music Album ===
Year	Album name	Language	Co-artist	Singers
2021	Beatta Yaethi	Tamil		Rakshita Suresh
