= Puthumugangal Thevai =

- Directed by: Manish Babu
- Written by: Kavitha Bharathy (dialogues)
- Produced by: S. A. Abhiman
- Starring: Shivaji Dev; Rajesh Yadav; Banu
- Cinematography: Rajesh Yadav; Saravanan
- Edited by: Suresh Urs
- Music by: Twinz Chan (Twinz Tunes)
- Production company: Winner Bulls Film
- Release date: 28 December 2012
- Country: India
- Language: Tamil

Puthumugangal Thevai (transl. New faces needed) is a 2012 Indian drama film directed by Manish Babu and starring Shivaji Dev, Rajesh Yadav, and Banu.

== Cast ==
- Shivaji Dev as Anand
- Rajesh Yadav as Mani
- Banu as Bindutara
- Vishnupriya
- M. S. Bhaskar
- Crane Manohar
- Raj Kapoor
- Kadhal Dhandapani
- Delhi Ganesh

== Soundtrack ==
The soundtrack was composed by Twinz Chan(Twinz Tunes).

- "Karuvizhi" - Haricharan, Swetha Mohan
- "En Uyiril" - Tippu, Anup (Twinz Chan)
- "Adicha Ghilli" - Mukesh Mohamed, Senthildas, Priya Himesh
- "Kollywood Kanavu" - Suchith Suresan, Sricharan, Achu

== Reception ==
A critic from The Times of India gave the film a rating of two out of five stars and stated that "With no great performance from any of the actors, Puthumugangal Thevai ends up just reiterating its name". A critic from The Hindu wrote that "PT isn’t exactly slipshod. Yet, because of a story and screenplay that could have been better devised, it doesn’t appeal".
