= Ranatantra =

2016 Indian Kannada Romantic film-action- thriller film

- Theatrical Poster
- Directed by: Aadiram
- Written by: Aadiram
- Produced by: S.Ramesh
- Starring: Vijay Raghavendra; Hariprriya
- Cinematography: Rajesh Yadav
- Edited by: Srikanth
- Music by: M.Karthik
- Production company: Manoj Kumar Yadav Productions
- Release date: 18 March 2016
- Country: India
- Language: Kannada

Ranatantra is a 2016 Indian Kannada-language romantic action thriller film written and directed by Aadiram, making his debut, and produced by S.Ramesh. It features Vijay Raghavendra and Hariprriya in the lead roles, and a supporting cast that includes Sathyajith, Bhajarangi Madhu, Vishal Hedge, and Aishwarya Sindhogi. The movie is a remake of the 2008 Tamil movie Silandhi, which itself was loosely based on the English movie I Know What You Did Last Summer. The movie was dubbed in Telugu as Suryakala, in Tamil as Idi Pedda Saithan, and in Hindi as Agniputra. The score and soundtrack for the film is by M. Karthik and the cinematography is by Rajesh K.Narayan.

== Cast ==
- Vijay Raghavendra as Goutham
- Hariprriya as Swarna
- Sathyajith
- Vishal Hedge
- Bhajarangi Madhu
- Aishwarya Sindhogi

== Soundtrack ==
Ranatantra

Soundtrack album by M.Karthik
- Genre: Feature film soundtrack
- Language: Kannada
- Label: Lahari Music
- Producer: S.Ramesh

The film's background score and the soundtracks are composed by M.Karthik. The music rights were acquired by T-Series.

Tracklist
| No. | Title | Lyrics | Singer(s) | Length |
|---|---|---|---|---|
| 1. | "Ninagintha Mohakavada" | Kaviraj | Karthik, Megha, Rani, Vidya | 3:53 |
| 2. | "Angela" | V. Nagendra Prasad | Vijay Prakash | 4:30 |
| 3. | "Laka Laka Ladaki" | K. Kalyan | Madhu Balakrishnan | 4:21 |
| 4. | "Ha Naguva Samayya" | | Tippu, Anuradha Bhat |
| 5. | "Laka Laka Ladki" | | Suneetha |
