= Gowrisankaram =

- Movie Poster
- Directed by: Nemom Pushparaj
- Written by: Madambu Kunjukuttan
- Starring: Kavya Madhavan; Munna
- Cinematography: Alagappan N.
- Edited by: Raja Muhammed
- Music by: M. Jayachandran
- Production company: Harimurali Films
- Release date: 25 December 2003
- Country: India
- Language: Malayalam

Gowrisankaram is a 2003 Indian Malayalam-language romance film directed by Nemom Pushparaj and written by Madambu Kunjukuttan, starring Munna and Kavya Madhavan as two long-lost childhood sweethearts. This is also one of the final films of Narendra Prasad.

== Plot ==
Due to unforeseen circumstances, childhood sweethearts Gauri and Sankaran get separated. However, their bond withstands the test of time and reunites them years later.

== Cast ==
- Kavya Madhavan as Gowri
- Munna as Sankaran
- Mithun Ramesh as Gopi, Gowri's brother
- Narendra Prasad as Ramabhadran Thirumeni
- Oduvil Unnikrishnan as Achuthan Kurup bhattathiri
- Aranmula Ponnamma as Grandmother of Sankaran
- Urmila Unni as Subhadra Antharjanam
- Sukumari as Sankaran Aunt(cameo role)

== Soundtrack ==
Music: M. Jayachandran, Lyrics: Gireesh Puthenchery.

- "Kannil Kannil" (D) - P. Jayachandran, K. S. Chitra
- "Kannil Kannil" (F) - K. S. Chitra
- "Krishna Bolo" (D) - Madhu Balakrishnan, Abitha
- "Paalkkadalil Pallikollum" (D) - P. Jayachandran, K. S. Chitra
- "Thiriyeriyunna" (M) - K. J. Yesudas
- "Urangaathe" (D) - P. Jayachandran, K. S. Chitra
- "Urangaathe" (M) - P. Jayachandran
