= Jigiri Dosthu =

2023 Indian film by Aran V

- Release poster
- Directed by: Aran V
- Written by: Aran V
- Produced by: Pradeep Jose K Aran V
- Starring: Shariq Hassan; Aran V; Ammu Abhirami; Pavithra Lakshmi
- Cinematography: Saran RV
- Edited by: Arul Mozhi Varman
- Music by: Ashwin Vinayagamoorthy
- Production companies: lords P International & Vvk Entertainment
- Release date: 22 December 2023
- Country: India
- Language: Tamil

Jigiri Dosthu is a 2023 Indian Tamil-language comedy thriller film written and directed by Aran V. The film stars Shariq Hassan, Aran V, Ammu Abhirami and Pavithra Lakshmi in the lead roles. The film was produced by Pradeep Jose K and Aran V under the banner of Lords P International and Vvk Entertainment.

== Cast ==
- Shariq Hassan as Rishi
- Aran V as Vignesh Kumar "Vicky"
- Ammu Abhirami as Dhivya
- Pavithra Lakshmi as Sanju
- Vj Ashiq as Loki Karanian
- Gowtham Sundararajan
- Anupama Kumar
- Kpy Sarath
- Jangiri Madhumitha

== Production ==
The film was produced by Pradeep Jose K and Aran V under the banner of Lords P International and Vvk Entertainment. The cinematography was done by Saran RV, while editing was handled by Arul Mozhi Varman.

== Soundtrack ==
Soundtrack was composed by Ashwin Vinayagamoorthy.

- Adiye Un Kangal - Ashwin Vinayagamoorthy
- Jigiri Dosthu Theme - Ashwin Vinayagamoorthy
- Va Da En Jigiri - Ashwin Vinayagamoorthy

== Reception ==
Roopa Radhakrishnan of The Times of India wrote that "Another standout is VJ Ashiq as Loki, who might be the least heroic among the three main leads, but the actor is the one who leaves the biggest impression." and rated two out of five.Samayam critic gave two out of five and noted that "There are good things in the film. Ashwin Vinayakamurthy's background score is a major strength of the film. The background music is more terrifying than the visuals. Among the three friends, VJ Aashiq, who played the role of Loki, is the most popular among the fans."
