= Shariq Hassan =

Indian actor

- Born: Shariq Hassan; 7 December 1994 (age 31); Chennai, Tamil Nadu, India
- Other name: Shariq Hassan Khan
- Occupation: Actor
- Years active: 2010–present
- Spouse: Maria Jennifer (m. 2024)
- Children: 1
- Parent(s): Riyaz Khan (father); Uma Riyaz Khan (mother)
- Relatives: Kamala Kamesh (grandmother)

Shariq Hassan (born 7 December 1994) is an Indian actor who predominantly appears in Tamil films and television shows. He played the role of villain in the 2016 film Pencil. He is known for participating in Bigg Boss 2.

== Early life and personal life ==
Shariq Hassan was born on 7 December 1994, in Chennai, Tamil Nadu to actors Riyaz Khan and Uma Riyaz Khan.

On 8 August 2024, Shariq married his long-term girlfriend Maria Jennifer in a traditional Christian wedding. In July 2025, the couple welcomed a son.

== Career ==
Hassan debuted in the 2016 Tamil film Pencil, and several critics felt that his performance was one of the film's highlights. He made his television debut in 2018 when he joined the second season of Bigg Boss as a contestant; he was evicted from the show on the 49th day. In 2018, he signed up for the film Uggramm (still unreleased), and in 2020 for Jigiri Dosthu, which released in December 2023. In 2021, Hassan participated in the dance competition BB Jodigal, which aired on Star Vijay, and his duet with Anitha Sampath won the show. In 2022, he signed up for another film with Vishnu Vishal, Mohandas. In 2024, he starred in Netru Indha Neram as the lead.

== Filmography ==
Key
†	Denotes films that have not yet been released

Year	Film	Role	Notes	Ref.
2010	Maanja Velu	Protestor	Uncredited	
2016	Pencil	Nithin		
2022	Don	Teja		
2023	Jigiri Dosthu	Rishi		
2024	Netru Indha Neram	Nikhil		
TBA	Resort †	TBA		

=== Web series ===
Year	Title	Role	Platform	Ref.
2020	Kaalam Neram Kadhal	Ron	YouTube	

=== Music videos ===
Year	Title	Music	Ref.
2019	Kannatti	AH Kaashif	

== Television ==
Year	Show	Role	Channel	Notes	Ref.
2018	Bigg Boss (Tamil season 2)	Contestant	Star Vijay	Evicted Day 49	
2021	BB Jodigal (season 1)	Contestant	Star Vijay	Winner	
2022	Bigg Boss Ultimate (season 1)	Contestant	Disney+ Hotstar	Evicted Day 21	
