= Varnajalam =

- DVD cover
- Directed by: Nagulan Ponnusamy
- Written by: Nagulan Ponnusamy
- Produced by: V. Gnanavel; Jayaprakash
- Starring: Srikanth; Sadha; Kutti Radhika
- Cinematography: B. Balamurugan
- Edited by: K. Palanivel
- Music by: Vidyasagar
- Production company: GJ Cinema
- Release date: 13 February 2004
- Country: India
- Language: Tamil

Varnajalam (transl. The magic of colour) is a 2004 Indian Tamil-language crime thriller film written and directed by Nagulan Ponnusamy in his debut. The film stars Srikanth, Sadha, and Kutti Radhika, while Nassar, Riyaz Khan, and Karunas play supporting roles. The music was composed by Vidyasagar, with editing done by K. Palanivel and cinematography by B. Balamurugan. The film was released on 13 February 2004.

== Plot ==
Devanathan IPS, the Commissioner of Chennai Police, retires and begins a new life with his family, which includes his brother Shekar, sister-in-law Viji, and their children. Devanathan buys two large tea estates in Ooty and moves in with his extended family there. Devanathan's daughter Anitha is a 22-year-old graduate who wants to become a sincere IPS officer like her father, and his older son Ashwin is a brilliant, yet troubled and antisocial 26-year-old young engineer. Six months after moving there, a man named Daniel arrives with a recommendation letter from a recently deceased priest in Chennai, Father Andrews, who is a schoolmate of Devanathan, to apply for a job as a tea estate manager. Daniel slowly becomes a favourite of the family with his good nature, music skills, and along with the fact that he saves Devanathan's life from criminals and wins the family's heart.

One night, Ashwin scares Devanathan by dressing himself as a stalker. Ashwin got chased by Devanathan and revealed his identity to him, while laughing insanely and madly at Devanathan. The next day, Ashwin drives too fast, almost kills the family from getting hit by a train, frightening them. He then gets into an argument with Devanathan and goes to Daniel's office. Daniel, while acting insanely, inflicts wounds on himself and blames it on Ashwin. Ashwin attempts to confront Daniel over this scene at the hospital that Daniel is recovering from. Daniel created a scene that fabricated Ashwin attempting to murder Daniel for presumably having an affair with Anitha. Ashwin was captured by the estate employees and is placed in the hospital. Daniel, who was discharged, stays alone at Devanathan's house while Devanathan & family go to the Hospital. Ashwin escapes his hospital room by locking Shekar, who was guarding him, in the washroom, and confronts Daniel again at his home. Daniel starts a fire in the cabin, where all of Devanathan's awards and medals are exhibited, blaming all of that on Ashwin. Ashwin attempts to stop and expose Daniel but is unsuccessful and the entire blame falls on him. Ashwin is taken to a mental hospital & instituted there. One month later, Shekar and Viji plan for a short trip when Shekar was to go to Chennai. But Devanathan stops Viji citing the work nature of the trip. The day after Shekar leaves, Daniel disguises himself as Devanathan by wearing his cap and black coat and spies on Viji when she is bathing. She thinks it was Devanathan, and the friction between the brothers starts, which grows to an end level when Shekar leaves the house with his family.

Months later, one noon, while riding her scooter, Anitha discovers Daniel's jeep and is shocked to see him performing Hindu rituals for a woman named Abhirami. Daniel reveals himself to be Shakthivel, a painter, who was raised up by his elder sister Karthiga and brother-in-law. He was academically very brilliant, but when his brother-in-law suffered from paralysis, he voluntarily gave up his school studies and became a painter. He and his sister's daughter Abhirami were in love. Abhirami enrolled herself in a medical college to become a doctor as her wish, while Shakthi covered the expenses and fee payments. Abhirami's parents plan their marriage after Abhirami finishes college. On Devanathan's last day in service, a junior officer, ACP Prabhakaran IPS, requests him permission to perform an encounter operation on a famous rowdy called Royapuram Guna. Unbeknownst to anyone in particular, Devanathan is under Guna's payroll. Though Devanathan refuses permission, the Home minister over-rides him, and the operation is carried out near a bus stop, where Abhirami was standing. Guna escapes due to Devanathan's prior given information to him, but Abhirami is killed in the crossfire of the shootout between Guna and his gang against the police. To save their names, Devanathan places Guna's photo inside Abhirami's work folder and fabricated her as like his lover. Shakthi is innocently arrested and sentenced for about six months in imprisonment for beating up policemen who came to question him and Abhirami's parents for Guna's whereabouts, while Abhirami's parents commit suicide over humiliation of the false fact of Abhirami being Guna's lover. Devanathan retires with honours. Prabhakaran who was guest visiting the prison that Shakthi was imprisoned in and revealed to him the truth when confronted by Shakthi and apologises to him over being unable to do anything to reveal the truth, due to the fact that Devanathan was his superior officer and had connections at the top level.

Anitha could not believe it at first, but Shakthi forcibly took her to the guest house that Devanathan brought and showed her Devanathan chatting on an escape plan for Guna and his friend, who were hiding in Ooty, aided by Devanathan to escape from the authorities. She was shocked to learn that her father is a criminal and runs away from Shakthi. Guna and his friend are about to escape from Ooty in a vehicle driven by Devanathan himself to avoid unnecessary checking. Shakthi chases them, and when they are about to cross a check post, he shoots at the car. Guna and his friend mistakenly thought it was police firing, so they came out and start firing, which triggers the actual and real police to come to the spot and kill Devanathan and the criminals in the shootout. Shakthi revealed his identity to Devanathan before he died, while stating that having him killed in the same way Abhirami was killed is Shakthi's punishment to him.

At the film's end, Shakthi is seen sitting in a bus leaving Ooty reading an article on a newspaper of Devanathan's death, with Anitha revealing the truth about her father being a criminal to the entire world written in it.

== Cast ==
- Srikanth as Daniel alias Shakthivel (Shakthi)
- Sadha as Abhirami
- Kutty Radhika as Anitha
- Nassar as Devanathan IPS
- Anandsami as Ashwin
- Riyaz Khan as Royapuram Guna
- Saranya Ponvannan as Karthiga
- Nizhalgal Ravi as Shakthivel's brother-in-law
- Thalaivasal Vijay as Shekar
- Kanchana Mendis as Viji
- Karunas as Logu
- Ajay Rathnam as ACP Prabhakaran IPS
- Ilavarasu as Police Constable
- Chitti Babu as Wine Shop Owner
- Crane Manohar as Drunkard
- Nellai Siva
- Bonda Mani
- Soori as Thief (uncredited)
- Sridhar in a special appearance in the song "Matha Matha"

== Production ==
Nagulan Ponnusaamy, who earlier worked as an assistant to G. M. Kumar and Raj Kapoor, made his directorial debut with this film. The film was shot for nearly 25 days in Sri Lanka, 15 days in Ooty and 20 days in Chennai.

== Soundtrack ==
The soundtrack was composed by Vidyasagar.

| Song title | Singers | Lyrics |
|---|---|---|
| "Nee Vendum" | Karthik, Mahathi | Thamarai |
| "Pinju Mazhai Charal" | Karthik | Arivumathi |
| "Oh Baby" | Nafrun Ghosh, Reshmi | Pa. Vijay |
| "Sottu Sottai" | Mathangi | Palani Bharathi |
| "Matha Matha" | Freddy Koikaran, Malathi | Na. Muthukumar |

== Critical reception ==
G. Ulaganathan of Deccan Herald wrote, "For a thriller, the first half lacks consistency. The screenplay is a bit slow and most of the scenes are predictable. But the second half is fast-paced. Vidyasagar’s musical score is just average and none of the songs are appealing". Malathi Rangarajan of The Hindu wrote, "On the face of it GJ Cinema's "Varnajaalam" (the title is a well-thought out one) is just another tale of revenge. But Nakulan Ponnusamy's treatment gives new dimensions to the narration. Though it is a thriller of sorts surprisingly the film has very few action scenes. But fear and suspense continue to mount at every stage, till the climax". Malini Mannath of Chennai Online wrote "It's a debutant's work, and the director should be commended for attempting to give a different style to the narration. Of trying to present a routine vendetta story, in the garb of a psychological thriller. But the attempt is not entirely successful. It's a case of good intentions gone awry!".

Indiainfo wrote, "Srikanth’s attempt of portraying negative role flounders at the start itself. His much-hyped VARNAJALAM is very clichéd. Lackluster screenplay and direction, predictable narration and slow pace of the film make it unwatchable. Though Srikanth has done good job portraying the role of Daniel, which has gray shades, the role is ill conceived. The motive for he becoming villain-like is very contrived. Debutant director Nagulan Ponnusamy’s amateurishness at handling linear story killed the film even more". Sify wrote, "The film has turned to be just another assembly line product as this psychological thriller has ended up as a half-baked experiment by Nakulan Ponnusamy, an amateurish debutant director".
