= Kousalya Supraja Rama (2008 film) =

2008 Telugu-language film

- DVD Cover
- Directed by: Surya Prasad
- Written by: Surya Prasad
- Dialogue by: Satyanand
- Produced by: D. Ramanaidu
- Starring: Srikanth; Charmme; Gowri Munjal
- Cinematography: Pratap V. Kumar
- Edited by: Marthand K. Venkatesh
- Music by: Koti
- Production company: Suresh Productions
- Release date: 9 October 2008
- Country: India
- Language: Telugu

Kousalya Supraja Rama is a 2008 Indian Telugu-language romantic drama film directed by Surya Prasad and starring Srikanth, Charmee and Gowri Munjal. The film released on 9 October 2008.

== Cast ==
- Srikanth as Sriram
- Charmee as Supraja, Ranga Rao's daughter (voiced by Sunitha)
- Gowri Munjal as Kausalya
- Kota Srinivasa Rao as Ranga Rao
- Sivaji as Ravi
- Tanikella Bharani as Narasimham
- Brahmanandam as Dorababu, a thief
- Dharmavarapu Subrahmanyam as Kubera Murthy
- Siva Reddy as Pandu Babu, Ranga Rao's son
- Ali
- Krishna Bhagavan as Appula Apparao
- Kadambari Kiran Kumar
- Venu Madhav
- L. B. Sriram as Supraja's uncle
- Raghu Babu
- Sairabanu as Subbulu
- Uttej
- Chalapathi Rao
- Hema as Priya, Ranga Rao's PA
- Duvvasi Mohan
- Apoorva
- Junior Relangi
- Anitha
- Master Deepak

== Production ==
The film was initially titled Boss Gari Ammayi.

== Soundtrack ==
The music is composed by Koti.

- "Kausalya Nachave Andamto Gichave Anchaate Nachaave" – Ramana Gogula, M. M. Srilekha (lyrics by Ramajogayya Sastry)

== Reception ==
Radhika Rajamani of Rediff.com rated the film 2 1/2 out of 5 and opined that "The performances, particularly Srikkanth's make the film work. Srikkanth is sincere in this film and one can certainly watch it for him. He is able to effortlessly switch between portraying the Good Samaritan and happily sing and dance too". Deepa Garimella of Full Hyderabad stated that "The story is passably average, but is propped up by healthy production values, good performances and sharp dialogue".
