= Gowri Munjal =

Indian actress and model

- Born: New Delhi, India
- Other names: Gouri Munjal, Gauri Munjal, Sonali Munjal
- Occupation: Actress
- Years active: 2005–2011
- Height: 1.62 m (5 ft 4 in)

Gowri “Sonali” Munjal is a former Indian actress and model who primarily worked in Telugu and Kannada films. She is probably best known for her performance as Mahalakshmi Somaraju in her debut film Bunny.

== Career ==
When she moved to Mumbai to pursue a career in acting, she got to know, that the producers of the Telugu film Bunny were looking for a new face to play the leading female role opposite Allu Arjun. She met the producers and immediately got the role of Mahalakshmi Somaraju, eventually becoming an actress. The film went to become a box office hit, after which she received acting offers from other South Indian film industries as well. She debuted in Kannada in the same year with the film Namma Basava, whilst in Telugu she played leading roles in Sri Krishna 2006 and Gopi - Goda Meedha Pilli.

Gowri Munjal then got the offer to essay the female leading role in a Tamil film, directed by P. Vasu, starring his son Sakthi Vasu in the lead role, following which she starred in another Tamil film Singakutty opposite Sivaji Ganesan's grandson, named Sivaji as well. Both the film were unsuccessful at the box office, failing to gain her popularity and fame in Kollywood. In Telugu, however, she got to play a vital role in Kousalya Supraja Rama as Charmi's sibling, whilst in Kannada she enacted the female lead in Jaaji Mallige, a remake of the Tamil film Devathayai Kanden. In 2009 then, she got a role in a Malayalam film Paleri Manikkam, a crime thriller, based on the same-named novel by T. P. Rajeevan, which was directed by popular director Ranjith and in which she appeared opposite Malayalam actor Mammootty.

== Filmography ==
Year	Film	Role	Language	Notes
2005	Bunny	Mahalakshmi Somaraju	Telugu	
2005	Namma Basava	Gauri	Kannada	
2006	Sri Krishna 2006	Indu	Telugu	
2006	Gopi	Vasu	Kannada	
2006	Gopi - Goda Meedha Pilli	Lakshmi	Telugu	
2007	Bhookailas		Telugu	Special appearance
2007	Thottal Poo Malarum	Anjali	Tamil	
2007	Gandana Mane	Gauri	Kannada	
2008	Singakutty	Anjali	Tamil	
2008	Kousalya Supraja Rama	Kausalya Ravi	Telugu	
2009	Jaaji Mallige	Uma	Kannada	
2009	Mast Maja Maadi	Herself	Kannada	cameo in song
2009	Bangaru Babu		Telugu	
2009	Paleri Manikyam	Sarayu Sharma	Malayalam	
2011	Race	Shwetha	Malayalam	
2011	Hori		Kannada	
