= Riyaz Khan =

Indian actor

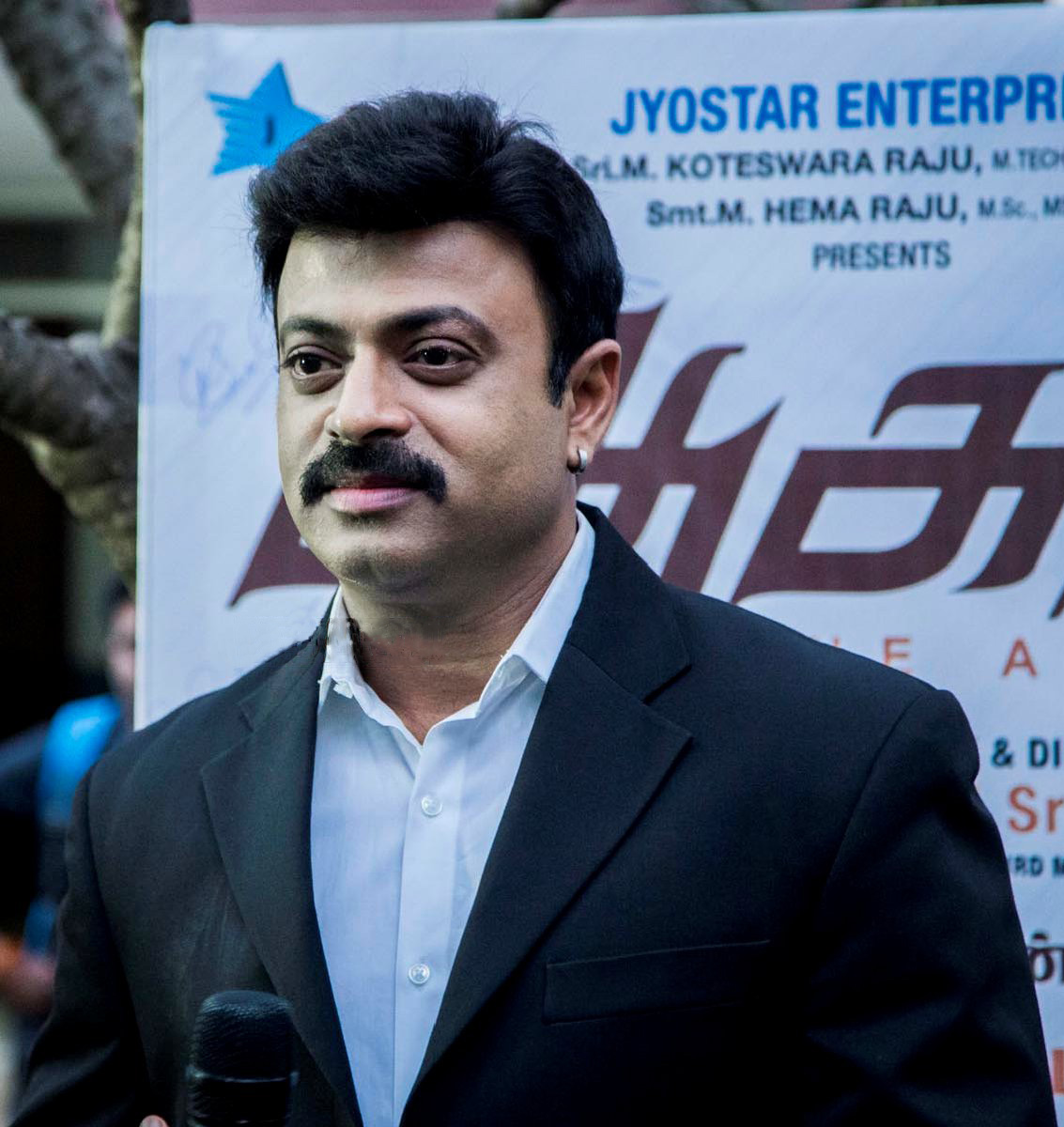
- Riyaz Khan promoting Aagam in 2016
- Born: Fort Kochi, Kerala, India
- Occupations: Actor; bodybuilder
- Years active: 1993–present
- Height: 5 ft 7 in (170 cm)
- Spouse: Uma Riyaz Khan (m. 1992)
- Children: 2, inc. Shariq Hassan

Riyaz Khan is an Indian actor and bodybuilder. He predominantly works in Malayalam and Tamil films and television series, besides acting in a few Telugu and Kannada films, as well as two Hindi films. Khan debuted in Malayalam through the 1994 film Sukham Sukhakaram, directed by Balachandra Menon.

== Early and personal life ==
Khan was born to Rasheed, a Malayalam film producer and Rasheeda Baanu at Fort Kochi, Kerala. He has a sister, Roshini. Since his father was a movie producer and all the South Indian movies were then shot in Madras, now known as Chennai, his family migrated there.

He did his primary education from Chennai and pursued his bachelor's degree from the United States.

In 1992, he married actress Uma Riyaz, who is the daughter of Tamil music director Kamesh and actress Kamala Kamesh. The couple has two sons including actor Shariq Hassan.

== Career ==
His notable films include Badri (2001), Baba (2002), Ramana (2002), Balettan (2003), Winner (2003), Runway (2004), Vesham (2004) Power of Women (2005) Ghajini (2005), Thirupathi (2006), Stalin (2006) and Pokkiri Raja (2010).

He has also made significant contributions to television, appearing in popular Tamil serials like Nandini (2017-2018) and Kannana Kanne (2020-2023) which was aired on Sun TV.

He is also a brand ambassador of a Chennai-based fitness studio called Inshape Health & Fitness.

== Filmography ==
=== Malayalam ===
Year	Title	Role	Notes
1994	Sukham Sukhakaram		
1996	Nandhagopalante Kusruthikal		
2000	Raakkilikal		
2001	Ennum Sambavami Yuge Yuge		
2003	Balettan	Bhadran	
2004	Symphony	Sathyanath	
2004	Vajram		
2004	Jalolsavam	Dubai Jose / Cheenkanni Jose	
2004	Runway	Chinnadan Babu	
2004	Mayilattam	Ripper Vasu	
2004	Vesham	Deepak	
2005	Five Fingers	Hari Narayanan IPS	
2005	Kochi Rajavu	Siva	
2005	Sarkar Dada	Abbas	
2005	Isra	Revanna	
2005	Hai	Vinu/Vinodkumar /Vishnu / Vishnuprasad	
2005	Pauran	Thomachan	
2006	Highway Police	C.I. Jayachandran	
2006	Lion	Harshan	
2006	Bada Dosth	C.I. Niranjan Das	
2006	Narakasuran	Supt. of Police Rajan	
2006	Yes Your Honour	Gopikrishnan	
2007	Subhadram		
2007	Payum Puli	Isaac John	
2007	The Speed Track	Tinu Nalinakshan	
2007	Rakshakan	Vedimara Zakir	
2007	July 4	Danny	
2007	Indrajith	Rajendran	
2008	Shambu	Parthasaradhi	
2009	Duplicate	ACP Antony Rosarrio	
2009	Thirunakkara Perumal	Jose	
2009	Rahasya Police	Kallan Keshu	
2010	Pokkiri Raja	Maheendran	
2010	The Thriller	Paramadayil Subhash	
2010	Avan	Dharman	
2010	Vandae Maatharam	Balan	
2011	Campus Days		
2011	Snehaadaram		
2011	Pachuvum Kovalanum	ACP John Kuruvila	
2011	Oru Nunakkadha		
2012	Manthrikan	Giri	
2012	The Hitlist	CI Simon	
2012	Casanovva	Joseph	
2012	Grandmaster	Jerome Jacob	
2012	Simhasanam	SP Vetrivel Maaran IPS	
2012	Scene Onnu Nammude Veedu	Amal	
2012	Mayamohini	Sanjay Mishra	
2012	Mr. Marumakan	ACP Madhuram Ramachandran	
2012	Karma Yodha	Sathan Sunny	
2013	120 Minutes	V. Gulothangan	
2013	Nadodimannan	C.I. George TV	
2013	Mumbai Police	Sniper Hitman	
2014	Seconds	Aby Thomas	
2014	Villali Veeran	Giridhar Vishwanathan	
2014	Shadow Man	Surya	
2015	Ilanjikkavu P.O.		
2015	TP 51		
2015	High Alert		
2015	Ithinumappuram	Karthikeyan	
2015	Samrajyam II: Son of Alexander	Sanjaydas	
2015	Two Countries	Kiran	
2016	Pachakkallam	S.I. Madhuram	
2016	Dhanayathra		
2016	Aneezya		
2016	Chinnadada		
2017	Pakal Pole		
2018	Nimisham		
2018	Monnam Niyamam		
2019	Jack & Daniel	NRI guest at hotel (Cameo)	
2022	Aaraattu	Damodarji	
2022	Mathamgi	Soorya Narayanan	
2024	Once Upon a Time in Kochi	Sharp Shooter D'cruz	
2024	DNA	Peter John Vinayakam	
2024	Marco	C.I. Imran Malik	Deleted Cameo appearance
2025	Painkili	Peter	
2025	Bha Bha Ba	Torpedo	Cameo appearance
2026	Secret of Kalinga		

=== Tamil ===
Year	Title	Role	Notes
1993	Athma	Naveen	
1994	Chinna Madam	Gopal's friend	
1999	Kallazhagar	Jamal	
2000	Maayi	Marriage guest	
2001	Nageswari		
2001	Badri	Vetri	
2001	Samudhiram	Ramesh	
2001	Asokavanam	Mohan	
2001	Aalavandhan	Sultan	
2002	Shree	Velayudham	
2002	Baba	Ramaswamy's son	
2002	Ramanaa	Rishi	
2002	Kadhal Azhivathillai	Vasanth	
2003	Arasu	Sabhapathy's son	
2003	Success	Kicha	
2003	Unnai Charanadaindhen		
2003	Bheeshmar	Doctor Sakthi	
2003	Winner	Kattadurai	
2003	Ottran	Beer Mohammed	
2003	Enakku 20 Unakku 18	kumar	
2004	Varnajalam	Royapuram Guna	
2004	Jana	Bhandari's brother	
2005	Gurudeva	Deva's unwanted suitor	
2005	Power of Women	Shyam	
2005	Chinna		
2005	Ghajini	Police Inspector	
2006	Thirupathi	Soori	
2006	Perarasu	Kabali	
2007	Muruga	Selvam	
2007	Parattai Engira Azhagu Sundaram		
2007	Cheena Thaana 001	Gowri Shankar	
2007	Nam Naadu	Krishna Kumar I.P.S	
2008	Akku	Aadhi Narayanan	
2008	Vambu Sandai	Narayanan	
2008	Vaitheeswaran	ACP Shakthi	
2008	Azhagu Nilayam	Bhaskar	
2008	Arasangam	Jaffar	
2008	Silandhi	Police Officer	
2009	Muthirai	Aadhikesavan's assistant	
2009	Malai Malai	Deputy Commissioner	
2009	Jaganmohini	Indrajith	
2009	Aadhavan	ACP Deva	
2010	Thairiyam	Mohan	
2010	Yathumaagi		
2010	Sura	ACP Dass	
2010	Kutti Pisasu	Nanjappan	
2010	Maanja Velu	DGP Easwarapandian	
2010	Vandae Maatharam	Balan	
2011	Ponnar Sankar	Vaiyamperumal	
2011	Mambattiyan	Fake Mambattiyan	
2012	Yaarukku Theriyum	V. Gulothungan	
2013	Kantha		
2015	Masss	Kamal Ekambaram	
2016	Tharkappu	Arjun	
2016	Saagasam	Bar owner	
2016	Aagam	Akilesh Acharya	
2017	Vilayattu Aarambam		
2018	Bhaskar Oru Rascal	Riyas Ahemad I.P.S	
2021	Maya Maligai		
2022	Ponniyin Selvan: I	Soman Sambhavan	
2022	Sheela		
2023	Ponniyin Selvan: II	Soman Sambhavan	
2023	Raakadhan	Austin	
2023	Kapil Returns	Prakash	
2024	Oru Thee	Police Officer	Direct release on Thanthi One
2024	Petta Rap	Veeramani	

=== Telugu ===
Year	Title	Role	Notes
1991	Madhuranagarilo		
2003	Nee Manasu Naaku Telusu	Kumar	
2003	Dongodu	Sub-Inspector	
2004	Shiva Shankar	Hemadri	
2005	Guru	Deva's suitor	
2005	Nayakudu	Venugopal	
2006	Naayudamma		
2006	Stalin	Muddu Krishnayya's son	
2006	Veerabhadra		
2006	Rajababu	Goon	
2007	Tulasi	Shankar	
2009	Cara Majaka	Nagendra	
2021	WWW	Khan	
2023	Ala Ila Ela	Police Officer	

=== Kannada ===
Year	Title	Role	Notes
2003	Veera Kannadiga	Dhanraj	
2005	Namma Basava	Jr Pampapathi	
2006	Mohini 9886788888	Vicky	
2010	Bombat Car	Selvadore	
2012	Challenge	V. Gulothangan	
2023	Sheela		

=== Hindi ===
Year	Title	Role	Notes
2001	Abhay	Sulthan	Simultaneously shot with Aalavandhan
2008	Ghajini	Inspector Arjun Yadav	Remake of the 2005 film of the same name

== Television ==
Year	Title	Role	Channel	Language
1998	Ramany vs Ramany	Suresh	Sun TV	Tamil
1999–2001	Kudumbam	Mouli	Sun TV	Tamil
2000	Chithi	Anand	Sun TV	Tamil
2002	Annamalai	Nallasivam	Sun TV	Tamil
2017–2018	Nandini	Seiya Nayagi and Rathnavel Bhoopathi	Sun TV	Tamil
2017–2019	Nandini	Ranganayaki and Krishnamoorthi Bhoopathi	Udaya TV	Kannada
2019–2022	Magarasi	Sendhoora Pandian	Sun TV	Tamil

=== Special Appearances ===
Year	Title	Role	Channel	Language
2021	Kannana Kanne	Dharmadurai	Sun TV	Tamil
2022	Swantham Sujatha	Rudran	Surya TV	Malayalam
2022	Kanyadanam	SP Jagan	Surya TV	Malayalam
2023	Kumkumacheppu	Himself	Flowers TV	Malayalam
2024	Iniya	Inspector Deenadayalan	Sun TV	Tamil
2024	Manathe Kottaram	Himself	Zee Keralam	Malayalam

== Awards ==
- Winner, Tamil Nadu State Film Award for Best Villain for Power of Women (2003)
