= Uma Riyaz Khan =

Indian actress

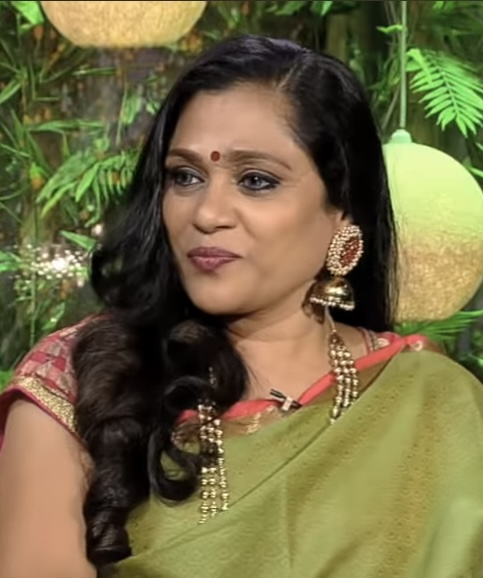
- Uma in 2018
- Born: Uma Kamesh; Chennai, Tamil Nadu, India
- Other name: Uma Riyaz
- Occupations: Actress; dancer
- Years active: 1984–present
- Spouse: Riyaz Khan (m. 1992)
- Children: 2, including Shariq Hassan

Uma Riyaz Khan is an Indian actress. She has appeared in Tamil television shows and in supporting roles in a few Tamil films. She is the 1st runner-up of cooking reality show Cook with Comali .

== Personal life ==
Uma was the only child of her artist parents. Her father, Kamesh, was a music director and her mother, Kamala Kamesh, was a famous actress who is well respected in the industry. After losing her father aged nine, she was single-handedly brought up by her mother. She married Malayalam actor Riyaz Khan in 1992. They have two sons, Shariq Hassan Khan and Shamarth Hassan Khan.

Uma went to Fatima Convent School in Kodambakkam. She was a state level athlete in 100 meters, Javelin throw, and a professional dancer. She was a trained classical dancer, and later switched to salsa and other Latin American dance forms.

== Career ==
Uma's first film was Anbulla Rajinikanth and her second film was the Hindi film Muskurahat (1992) by director Priyadarshan. In the film she played Amrish Puri's daughter. She described her second movie as a 'superb' experience. She calls her work in the film Anbe Sivam (2003) as her magnum opus. For her performance in Mouna Guru (2011), she received a lot of appreciation in the form of awards that year.

She took part in second season of the much talked about show, Jodi Number One, which aired on Vijay TV in 2007. After that she judged a show called Kalakka Povathu Yaaru. Uma Riyaz Khan acted in the negative role in Chandrakumari serial along with Radhika Sarathkumar in Sun TV.

== Filmography ==
=== Films ===
- Note: all films are in Tamil, unless otherwise noted.

Year	Film	Role	Notes
1984	Anbulla Rajinikanth	Siriya Pushpam	
1992	Muskurahat	Gopichand Verma's daughter	Hindi film
2003	Anbe Sivam	Mehrunnissa	
2004	Kanavu Meippada Vendum	Kokila	
2011	Mouna Guru	Inspector Palaniammal	Vijay Award for Best Supporting Actress; Nominated, SIIMA Award for Best Actor or Actress in a Supporting Role – Tamil
2012	Ambuli	Ponni	
2013	Maryan	Seeli	
2013	Biriyani	Hitwoman	
2015	Thoongaa Vanam	Maheswari	
2016	Sutta Pazham Sudatha Pazham		
2017	Nibunan / Vismaya	Dr. Ramya	Bilingual Tamil-Kannada film
2018	Saamy 2	Sub-Inspector Noorjahan	
2022	D Block	Warden	
2022	Aadhaar		
2025	Flash Back	TBA	Only the Hindi dubbed version was released.

== Television ==
Serials

Year	Title	Role	Channel	Language
2000–2001	Irandaam Chanakyan		Sun TV	Tamil
2001–2002	Marumagal		Vijay TV	Tamil
2016	Vinnaithaandi Varuvaayaa	Gayatri	Vijay TV	Tamil
2016	Vamsam		Sun TV	Tamil
2017–2018	Ninaika Therintha Manamae	Mallika	Vijay TV	Tamil
2018–2019	Chandrakumari	Devika	Sun TV	Tamil
2022–2026	Kayal	Sivasankari	Sun TV	Tamil
2022–2023	Raja Rani 2	Gowri IPS	Star Vijay	Tamil

Shows

Year	Title	Role	Channel	Language
2019–2020	Cooku with Comali	Contestant (Runner Up)	Star Vijay	Tamil
2021	Cooku with Comali Season 2	Guest	Star Vijay	Tamil
2021	Comedy Raja Kalakkal Rani	Judge	Star Vijay	Tamil
2021	BB Jodigal	Guest	Star Vijay	Tamil
2022	Oo Solriya Oo Oohm Solriya	Participant ( Winner)	Star Vijay	Tamil
2024–Present	Naanga Ready Neenga Ready Ah	Recurring Judge	Sun TV	Tamil

== Awards ==
Vijay Awards

- 2011 - Vijay Award for Best Supporting Actress - Mouna Guru

Vikatan Award

- 2011 - Vikatan Award for Best Supporting Actress - Mouna Guru
