= List of Bigg Boss (Tamil TV series) controversies =

Bigg Boss is a television reality show broadcast on Star Vijay in India. It follows the Big Brother format, which was first developed by Endemol in the Netherlands.

== Season 1 ==
- Oviya and Arav liplock kiss made headlines with national television.
- Bharani climbed over the fence of the Bigg Boss house and tried to escape due to suffering from mental health issues in the house.
- Oviya told host Kamal Haasan that she was getting bullied and verbally and mentally abused by Gayathri Raguram during their stay in the house.
- During a task, Juliana was pulled by Oviya while Juliana was on a red carpet, and the fight later turned ugly.
- Oviya attempted suicide by drowning in the pool, which was located in the garden of the house, after a massive verbal argument she had with Arav, and, on mental health grounds, she walked out of the show.
- During a luxury budget task, Suja Varunee ripped Snehan's T-shirt and punched him on his back and later calling him "Nai" (dog).

== Season 2 ==
- Contestant Aishwarya Dutta had caused a ruckus inside the house during a Hitler roleplay in the house. She also chucked rubbish on her co-contestant, Thaadi Balaji, during a heated argument.
- Aishwarya Dutta passed on a racist remake to her co contestant Riythvika calling her "Chennai dog". Her remark burst in Twitter, and people wanted Aishwarya to be sent out for foul behavior.
- Thaadi Balaji joined Bigg Boss 2 without knowing his ex spouse Nithya will be featured as a contestant in the same season too, During their stay in the house, Nithya and Thaadi Balaji got into dirty arguments and accusing each other of death treats.
- Aishwarya Dutta claimed to Bigg Boss that during the "Hitler task," Ponnambalam strangled Aishwarya and pushed her into the pool.
- Ponnambalam also apologized to Aishwarya Dutta about the foul language he used against her, which was referring to denigrating women.
- Mahat Raghavendra insulted Thaadi Balaji's occupation in the house, calling him a "Comedian in cinema and a comedian in real life." This speech triggered a major fight in the house.
- Mahat Raghavendra also verbally abused and tried to infuriate the fellow contestant, Mumtaj. This has led to a lot of criticism of the show's host, Kamal Hassan, who had to evict Mahat with a red card.

== Season 3 ==
- Actor Saravanan revealed that he touched and talked to women inappropriately on a bus before entering the show; due to that issue, Saravanan was ejected from the show immediately without any second chances.
- Jangiri Madhumitha cut her wrist on 16 August 2019 as a result of provocation. It is reported that she already had problems with the contestants of the house except Cheran and Kasthuri, as she stated that the male contestants of the house, especially Kavin, Mugen, and Tharshan, use the female contestants of the house like Abhirami, Losliya, Sherin, and Sakshi to retain themselves at the house. During a discussion about the Tamil Nadu-Karnataka Kaveri issue, Madhumitha's words were criticized by the housemates, and later, this provoked her by her identity as a Tamil woman. Out of erupting anger, Madhumitha cut her wrist and thus, ejected by the Bigg Boss for her safety.
- Contestant Sakshi Agarwal made a controversial speech during a conversation with co-contestant Sherin Shringar, saying that "Public people are nonstop barking dogs who bark for no reason." Her speech made viewers think negatively of her, and she was later evicted. After her eviction, she made a public apology for her words of what she said in the house.
- During a heated argument between Jangiri Madhumitha and Vanitha Vijayakumar, Madhumitha told Vanitha to "Shut Up" and told her to keep her voice down and quiet.
- Vanitha Vijayakumar told her co-contestant Abhirami Venkatachalam during an unhealthy argument, saying "This is not a fish market to yell in!".
- During a weekend episode, Jangiri Madhumitha told host Kamal Haasan that Abhirami Venkatachalam wore an inappropriate dress and acted inappropriately, which is not right for Tamil culture. Her co-housemates Vanitha Vijayakumar, Sakshi Agarwal and Sherin Shringar told off Madhumitha for her "pathetic speech."
- During a conversation that later turned into an ugly fight, Abhirami Venkatachalam told Mugen Rao that he was not a "Hero" but rather he is a "Zero." while the argument was getting worse, Mugen Rao took a chair and almost hit Abhirami with it.
- During a reunion episode, Vanitha Vijayakumar accuses Sherin Shringar of being the blame for their fellow contestant Tharshan Thiyagarajan's eviction, later the argument turns into a catfight.
- During one of the episodes, Tamil Nadu police department entered the Bigg Boss house to investigate Vanitha Vijayakumar regarding a legal issue that she left hanging from outside.
- Contestant Meera Mitun was also involved a money robbery case before her appearance on Bigg Boss and the police department yet again returned to the house to charge her for her crime while she was still on the show.
- During a luxury budget task Cheran accidentally pushed Meera Mitun, However Meera took the act of Cheran seriously and stated saying that Cheran "Manhandled" her and "touched her inappropriately".
- After the eviction of Meera Mitun, she attended an interview and told to the interviewer that Cheran "Was racist and violent towards me in the Bigg Boss house" and she also said that she felt "violated" by Cheran.
- After Jangiri Madhumitha walked out of the house, she told the press saying that she got "gang-ragged by everyone except Kasthuri and Cheran".
- During a school luxury budget task, Kasthuri passed on a fat shaming remake to Vanitha Vijayakumar, and Vanitha later caused havoc in the house and wanted Kasthuri evicted on spot after her negative remark towards her.
- Vanitha Vijayakumar accused her fellow housemate Sherin Shringar of having an affair with another housemate Tharshan Thiyagarajah. Sherin totally denied Vanitha's statement and told Vanitha "How dare you bloody call my relationship with him an affair".

== Season 4 ==
- During a discussion between Sanam Shetty and Balaji Murugadoss. Balaji described Sanam's modeling title as a 'Dubakur' (fake one) and are acquired through her, involving in casting couch. This was clearly shown in one of the Promos. Followed by controversies, the promo was deleted from Vijay TV social media handles. Sanam was not happy about the remark Balaji gave her and they both got in a nasty fight. However, during her re-entry, Sanam forgave Balaji for his abusive words.
- During another argument between Sanam Shetty and Balaji Murugadoss, during a ranking task, Sanam said she deserves to be in the 2nd position but Balaji did not agree to her opinion and started to argue with her. At last, he started self abusing himself by hitting himself with his own slipper.
- Suresh Chakravarthy assaulted co-contestant Anitha Samapth's profession in a discussion, Suresh saying that "Newsreaders spit every time they read the news". This later, broke into a nasty fight between Anitha and Suresh.
- During a task Suresh Chakravarthy hits Sanam Shetty with a scepter later admitting to it as an "Accident". However, housemates disagree with Suresh and tell him to apologize to Sanam. Suresh later burst into tears in the confession room after knowing his mistake. Meanwhile, Sanam was raged and requested Bigg Boss to eject Suresh for his behavior.
- Eliminations of Suresh Chakravarthy on Day 35 and Sanam Shetty on Day 63 led to a wide oppose by audience questioning the genuineness of people's vote.
- Contestants Archana Chandhoke, Rio Raj, Somashekar, Gabriella Charlton, Jithan Ramesh and Aranthangi Nisha formed an alliance called the "Love Bed", where they agreed not to nominate the members of the alliance and target particular contestants like Aari, Anitha and Sanam. As this was highly criticized by the audience and even questioned by the host, Archana said that it was just a group of friends who had nothing to favour between themselves during tasks. She also stated that "Love is her Strategy".
- While Aari Arujunan and Balaji Murugadoss were sent to the Bigg Boss jail as a punishment, Aari started accusing of the things Balaji's hasn't done in the house. Aari also called Balaji "Lazy" and "Useless". Balaji burst into anger and later said that he has done his share of job and need not sweep the place that is clean. He also stated that, "Aari isn't capable of living in this house". Later, Aari apologizes to Balaji.
- Contestant Samyuktha Shanmuganathan, accused co-contestant Aari Arujunan that he made an inappropriate talk on her motherhood. She also mocked at Aari's "Valarpu" (upbringing) and commented it to be wrong. Later Samyuktha's accusation was proved to be false and she was evicted that week after going through a "kurumpadam" (Recap).

== Season 5 ==
- The controversial relationship with Abhinay Vaddi and Pavni Reddy was questioned by many viewers since Abhinay was already married but still being very intimate with Pavni on the show. Pavni clarified about this with Abhinay earlier, but still there was no response about this from Abhinay.
- During a task, Suruthi Periyasamy and Pavni Reddy stole a medal from Thamarai Selvi. After stealing her medal Thamarai bursts into tears and accuses Suruthi and Pavni of "betraying her trust".
- In a school task,Ciby Bhuvana Chandran had started ill treating Akshara Reddy out of spite. This had caused Akshara to lash out at Ciby.
- During the ticket to finale task, Thamarai Selvi and Priyanka Deshpande started getting physical with each other.
- During a heated argument between Niroop Nandhakumar and Priyanka Deshpande, Niroop started calling Priyanka as "Evil, Selfish and Heartless and the worst person in the house".
- During a heated argument Raju Jeyamohan and Ciby Bhuvana Chandran accused Pavani Reddy of forming a "Love Track" with Abhinay Vaddi and trying to use him for the Game Show. However Pavani yelled at Ciby and Raju saying "Stop invading my privacy!".
- Viewers started questioning the fairness of the show and their votes when Abishek Raja joined back the show as a wildcard, after being the second contestant eliminated.
- During the ticket to finale task, Niroop was discriminated by his co housemates and was the first contestant removed from the task race. He later complained to the host of show Kamal Haasan that "Here, the housemates are discriminated based on diplomacy".
- After the eviction of Abhinay Vaddi, his wife Aparna filled a divorce case against him saying "Abhinay seemed to have an affair with his co contestant Pavani Reddy while inside the Bigg Boss house". And fans of the show were shocked to see her response to the "Affair" controversy but it turn out to be a rumor and later in an interview Abhinay Vaddi said, "Firstly, I was shocked to see that news in the media. Was very disappointed to see this kinda false news being circulated by some irresponsible people. Aparna and I are happily married.".

== Season 6 ==
- Ayesha had a controversy for replying back aggressively and arrogantly at host Kamal Haasan.

== Season 7 ==
- Kamal Haasan gave Pradeep Antony a Red Card (Ejection) without thorough investigation. During the weekend episode Pradeep admitted that he intentionally urinated in the toilets while keeping the door wide open, while there were women in the house. Pradeep was removed from the show after this.

== Season 9 ==
- The Thamizhaga Vazhvurimai Katchi (TVK), an ally of the ruling Dravida Munnetra Kazhagam, has demanded a ban on Bigg Boss 9 Tamil, alleging that the reality show undermines Tamil culture, ethics, and values. Party leader and MLA Velmurugan has claimed the programme contains obscene and vulgar content unsuitable for family audiences and prioritises profit over social responsibility. In November 2025, the party staged protests near the Bigg Boss set in Chennai and in other districts, prompting police deployment, and submitted an attention motion in the Tamil Nadu Assembly along with a police complaint. Velmurugan has warned of intensified protests if the state government does not act, while also questioning why Tamil Nadu has not banned the show when similar programmes were reportedly restricted in other states.
- In Week 13, During the Ticket to Finale week of Bigg Boss Tamil Season 9, a task-related incident involving contestants VJ Paaru, Kamrudin and Sandra sparked widespread debate. A video from the BB car task circulated on social media, appearing to show Kamrudin and Paaru pushing and kicking Sandra out of a stationary car, after which Sandra was seen collapsing and later taken for medical examination. The incident raised concerns about contestant safety, with viewers and some housemates concerned with excessive physical and verbal aggression, including the use of abusive language during the task. Host Vijay Sethupathi issued a red card to Paaru and Kamrudin, resulting in their immediate eviction from the house. Contestants and viewers condemned the act as crossing the line by physical harm and verbal abuse. The channel stated that no injuries or formal complaints were reported, describing the incident as aggressive but not violent. The episode has renewed broader criticism of the show's tasks, conduct and long-standing controversies surrounding Bigg Boss Tamil.

== Season 10 ==
In September 2026, comments made by host Vijay Sethupathi during a weekend episode sparked controversy after some viewers interpreted his remarks about leadership, promises and accountability as an indirect reference to Tamil Nadu Chief Minister and former actor C. Joseph Vijay. Sethupathi did not name Vijay or any political figure, and the remarks were made while discussing a contestant's leadership during a task involving ruling and opposition teams.

Following the controversy, the show's broadcaster issued a statement saying that conversations and interactions on Bigg Boss Tamil 10 were part of the programme's format and that interpretations extending beyond the show were neither intended nor endorsed. Filmmaker Atlee also addressed the controversy and commented on the speculation linking the remarks to Vijay. Sethupathi later clarified that his remarks referred to the contestants and situations within the Bigg Boss house and were not directed at anyone outside the programme.
