= Bigg Boss (Tamil TV series) season 5 =

Indian Tamil-language reality show

Bigg Boss
- Season 5
- Bigg Boss Tamil 5 logo
- Presented by: Kamal Haasan (Weeks 1 - 7, 9 - 15); Ramya Krishnan (Week 8)
- No. of days: 105
- No. of housemates: 20
- Winner: Raju Jeyamohan
- Runner-up: Priyanka Deshpande
- No. of episodes: 106

Release
- Original network: Star Vijay
- Original release: 3 October 2021 – 16 January 2022

Season chronology
- ← Previous; Season 4 Next → Season 6

Bigg Boss 5 is the fifth season of the Tamil-Indian reality series of Bigg Boss. The show premiered on 3 October 2021 on Star Vijay and Disney+ Hotstar with Kamal Haasan as the host for the fifth time. Nippon Paint was the main sponsor for the fifth season. Ramya Krishnan as appeared as a guest host for a week.

The grand finale took place on 16 January 2022. Raju Jeyamohan emerged as the winner, while Priyanka Deshpande emerged as the runner up of the season.

Niroop Nandakumar, Thamarai Selvi, Abhinay Vaddi and Suruthi Periyasamy returned as contestants in Bigg Boss Ultimate.

== Production ==
=== Eye logo ===
This season, the logo is pink eye with a pupil that represents blue eyes with small stars, surrounded by a gold outline of the eye.

=== Bigg Boss house ===
Changes to other parts of the house were also visible compared to the last season. Instead of last season's aesthetic theme background with contrast sparkling colors, this season's theme mainly keeps up natural colors and followed the theme of "Nature".

=== Teaser ===
On 4 September 2021, incorporating a paradigm shift in a Tamil wedding scene and co-relating it with the Bigg Boss house. Two more promotional teasers were released in September 2021, featuring different commentaries from Kamal Haasan.

=== Audience ===
On set for the weekend episodes after the ease of COVID-19 restrictions in Tamil Nadu.

== Housemate status ==
| Sr. | Housemates | Day entered | Day exited | Status |
|---|---|---|---|---|
| 1 | Raju | Day 1 | Day 105 | Winner |
| 2 | Priyanka | Day 1 | Day 105 | 1st Runner-up |
| 3 | Pavni | Day 1 | Day 105 | 2nd Runner-up |
| 4 | Amir | Day 51 | Day 105 | 3rd Runner-up |
| 5 | Niroop | Day 1 | Day 105 | 4th Runner-up |
| 6 | Thamarai | Day 1 | Day 98 | Evicted |
| 7 | Ciby | Day 1 | Day 95 | Walked ₹12L |
| 8 | Sanjeev | Day 53 | Day 91 | Evicted |
| 9 | Varun | Day 1 | Day 84 | Evicted |
| 10 | Akshara | Day 1 | Day 84 | Evicted |
| 11 | Abhinay | Day 1 | Day 77 | Evicted |
| 12 | Imman | Day 1 | Day 70 | Evicted |
| 13 | Abishek | Day 1 | Day 21 | Evicted |
| 13 | Abishek | Day 48 | Day 63 | Evicted |
| 14 | Iykki | Day 1 | Day 56 | Evicted |
| 15 | Isaivani | Day 1 | Day 49 | Evicted |
| 16 | Mathumitha | Day 1 | Day 42 | Evicted |
| 17 | Suruthi | Day 1 | Day 35 | Evicted |
| 18 | Chinnaponnu | Day 1 | Day 28 | Evicted |
| 19 | Nadia | Day 1 | Day 14 | Evicted |
| 20 | Namitha | Day 1 | Day 6 | Walked |

== Housemates ==
The list of housemates in the order of entering the house:

=== Original contestants ===
- Isaivani, a Gaana and folk artist
- Raju Jeyamohan, an actor known for his role in Natpuna Ennanu Theriyuma and the television series Naam Iruvar Namakku Iruvar Season 2.
- Mathumitha Raghunathan
- Abishek Raaja, a narrator, YouTuber and actor.
- Namitha Marimuthu
- Priyanka Deshpande, an anchor, known for her presence in Vijay TV and her comedy humor.
- Abhinay Vaddi, the grandson of Gemini Ganesan and Savitri, an actor, appeared in the films Ramanujan (2014) and Chennai 600028 II (2016).
- Pavni Reddy, an actress, known for acting in soap operas such as Rettai Vaal Kuruvi, Chinna Thambi, and Rasaathi.
- Chinnaponnu, a folk singer, who is known for singing many folk songs.
- Nadia Chang
- Imman Annachi, a stand-up comedian, host of famous kid's show and actor known for his appearance in films such as Goli Soda (2014) and Aindhaam Thalaimurai Sidha Vaidhiya Sigamani (2014).
- Suruthi Periyasamy, a runway model and actress.
- Akshara Reddy
- Iykki Berry
- Thamarai Selvi
- Ciby Bhuvana Chandran, an actor known for his roles in films like Vanjagar Ulagam (2018) and Master (2021).
- Niroop Nandakumar
- Varun, an actor known for acting in the movie Thalaivaa.

=== Wildcard contestants ===
- Amir
- Sanjeev Venkat, a television and film actor known for acting in the television series such as Kanmani and Thirumathi Selvam, and in the film Master (2021).

== Twists ==
The show routinely features tasks as part of the gameplay, following are few of the tasks:

=== Power Medal task ===
In the third week (Day 16), housemates were given a task to steal 5 medals all representing the five basic elements in the world. The 5 housemates who manage to steal the medals win a super power to save themselves from eviction in the future and topple captaincy. However, the power can only be used once and is only available until week 10.

| | Elements | Original holder of medal | Stole by | Current medal holder | Status of medal | Power Week | Validity of medal |
|---|---|---|---|---|---|---|---|
| The five power medals | Fire | Isaivani | None | Isaivani | Used | Week 4 | Permanently destroyed |
| The five power medals | Land | Priyanka | Niroop | | Used | Week 5 | Permanently destroyed |
| The five power medals | Sky | Pavni | None | Pavni | Used | Week 6 | Permanently destroyed |
| The five power medals | Air | Thamarai | Suruthi | | Unused | N/A | Permanently destroyed |
| The five power medals | Water | Varun | None | Varun | Used | Week 7 | Permanently destroyed |

Notes:

1. Mathumitha captured the Land Power Medal initially, transferring it to the later Original Holder of the Medal, Priyanka. As Priyanka stored it behind the House's refrigerator, her friend Niroop caught hold of the Medal afterwards.
2. Ciby took the Air Power Medal at first, in front of Thamarai and Varun and later gave it to Thamarai to save herself from the nominations. However, the Medal was later stolen by Suruthi but it was destroyed before its power week as Suruthi was eliminated before the Power of Medals started.
3. Pavni, Suruthi and Abhinay joined hands to take a Medal and later, Pavni caught hold of the Sky Power Medal.
4. Isaivani attained the Fire Power Medal with the help of her friends, Iykki and Ciby.
5. Raju, Akshara, Varun and Imman planned to take a Medal and later, Varun grabbed the Water Power Medal in the Garden Area.

== Weekly summary ==
| Week 1 | Entrances | Abhinay, Abishek, Akshara, Ciby, Chinnaponnu, Imman, Iykki, Isaivani, Mathumitha, Nadia, Namitha, Niroop, Pavni, Priyanka, Raju, Suruthi, Thamarai, and Varun entered the House on Day 1. |
| Week 1 | Days | Day 1–7 |
| Week 1 | Twist | None |
| Week 1 | Nominations | None |
| Week 1 | Captaincy Task | None |
| Week 1 | Luxury Budget Task | Oru Kathai Sollatuma: Housemates of the Bigg Boss House shared their past life, their sorrows, strengths, and how they achieved their dreams, with the other housemates. The other housemates have to paste a heart, like, or a dislike sticker if the housemate's story was relatable, inspirational, or non-inspirational. |
| Week 1 | Punishments | None |
| Week 1 | House Captain | None |
| Week 1 | Exits | Namitha Marimuthu Walked out of the house due to medical issues on Day 6. |
| Week 2 | Entrances | None |
| Week 2 | Days | Day 8–14 |
| Week 2 | Twist | During the Week 2 nomination process, any housemate who received at least one vote from inmates was nominated for the Week 2 eviction process. |
| Week 2 | Nominations | Abhinay, Abishek, Akshara, Chinnaponnu, Ciby, Imman, Isaivani, Iykki, Nadia, Niroop, Mathumitha, Priyanka, Raju, Suruthi, and Varun were nominated for the Week 2 Eviction Process. |
| Week 2 | Captaincy Task | All the contestants will have a balloon in their backs, whenever the alarm bell goes of they need to get the balloon popper and pop one of the other housemate's balloons in order for them to be out, the final person with the balloon wins captaincy. |
| Week 2 | Captaincy Task winner | Thamarai Selvi |
| Week 2 | Captaincy Task defeat | The other housemates |
| Week 2 | Luxury Budget Task | Oru Kathai Sollatuma: (continuation) The remaining 10 housemates who are yet to convey their stories to the other housemates are given the chance to share their life stories with the other housemates from Day 8 to Day 12. ' |
| Week 2 | Vijayadashami special drama task | All the contestants are dressed up as certain characters and need to put on a drama play to celebrate the festival Vijayadashami. |
| Week 2 | Punishments | None |
| Week 2 | House Captain | Thamarai Selvi was the Week 2 House Captain and was hence, exempted from the nomination process. |
| Week 2 | Safe contestants | Isaivani, Priyanka, Raju, Akshara, Imman, Ciby, Iykki, Niroop, Abhinay, Suruthi, Varun, Mathumitha, Chinnaponnu, and Abishek were saved from Week 2 Elimination Process on Day 13 & 14. |
| Week 2 | Exits | Nadia Chang was evicted from the Bigg Boss House on Day 14 after receiving the fewest votes. |
| Week 3 | Entrances | None |
| Week 3 | Days | Day 15–21 |
| Week 3 | Twist | Isaivani, Niroop, Pavni, Thamarai, and Varun manage to steal a medal and were awarded major powers in the game. |
| Week 3 | Nominations | Abhinay, Abishek, Akshara, Chinnaponnu, Isaivani, Iykki, Pavni, Priyanka, and Thamarai were nominated for the Week 3 Eviction Process. |
| Week 3 | Captaincy Task | Enna Feeling'u: The four best performers of the week Ciby, Isaivani, Raju, Imman, and Pavni were told to stand on a platform and try to avoid reacting to the co-contestants putting on skits and jokes in front of them. The housemate who stood the longest without showing or changing his/her reaction wins the task. As Ciby stood the longest, he won the Captaincy Task and became the House Captain of Week 3. |
| Week 3 | Captaincy Task winner | Ciby |
| Week 3 | Captaincy Task defeat | Imman, Pavni, Raju and Isaivani |
| Week 3 | Luxury Budget Task | Pancha Thandhiram: There are 5 medals in the outdoors, the person who takes the medal in a secretive way will be saved from the elimination list. Isavani steals the Fire coin, Niroop steals the Land coin, Pavni steals the Sky coin, Thamarai steals the Air coin and Varun steals the Water coin. |
| Week 3 | Punishments | Niroop, Priyanka, and Suruthi was in jail by Ciby the house captain for this week. |
| Week 3 | House Captain | Ciby Bhuvana Chandran was the Week 3 House Captain and was hence, exempted from the nomination process. |
| Week 3 | Safe contestants | Priyanka, Pavni, Akshara, Isaivani, Abhinay, Thamarai, Iykki, and Chinnaponnu were saved from Week 3 Elimination Process on Day 20 & 21. |
| Week 3 | Exits | Abishek Raaja was evicted from the Bigg Boss House on Day 21 after receiving the fewest votes. |
| Week 4 | Entrances | None |
| Week 4 | Days | Day 22–28 |
| Week 4 | Twist | The fire medal was the powerful medal of Week 4, and the owner of the medal Isaivani had full control of the kitchen and dining area. |
| Week 4 | Nominations | Abhinay, Akshara, Chinnaponnu, Imman, Isaivani, Pavni, Priyanka, Suruthi, and Varun were nominated for the Week 4 Eviction Process. |
| Week 4 | Captaincy Task | All housemates sit at the dining table and need to point at a housemate but say another housemate's name. The last housemate remaining wins captaincy. |
| Week 4 | Winner | Mathumitha |
| Week 4 | Defeat | The other housemates |
| Week 4 | Luxury Budget Task | Graamam vs Nagaram (Village vs City): The contestants have been split into two teams representing village and city, where Akshara and Niroop are the team captains, respectively. As Isaivani is the holder of the Fire Coin she is the adjudicator for the task. |
| Week 4 | Punishments | After being chosen as the worst performer and Abhinay, Mathumitha, Pavni, and Varun must sit outside and keep the fire on until morning without sleeping. |
| Week 4 | House Captain | Mathumitha Raghunathan was the Week 4 House Captain and was hence, exempted from the nomination process. |
| Week 4 | Safe contestants | Priyanka, Pavni, Akshara, Imman, Isaivani, Suruthi, Abhinay, and Varun were saved from Week 4 Elimination Process on Day 27 & 28. |
| Week 4 | Exits | Chinnaponnu Kumar was evicted from the Bigg Boss House on Day 28 after receiving the fewest votes. |
| Week 5 | Entrances | None |
| Week 5 | Days | Day 29–35 |
| Week 5 | Twist | Air medal was permanently destroyed The earth medal was the powerful medal of Week 5, and the owner of the medal Niroop had full control over the bedroom area. |
| Week 5 | Nominations | Abhinay, Akshara, Ciby, Isaivani, Iykki, Mathumitha, Niroop, Pavni, and Suruthi were nominated for the Week 5 Eviction Process. |
| Week 5 | Captaincy Task | Best performer from previous week luxury budget task, Ciby, and Raju play cup mukkiyam bigile task. The task is to play soccer using a gym ball and score more goals. Ciby won the task with 3-0 goals. Varun used a coin for himself to change the captain. |
| Week 5 | Winner | Ciby. Varun swapped the captaincy using WATER power medal |
| Week 5 | Defeat | Raju |
| Week 5 | Luxury Budget Task | Cinema Cinema: Each housemate was given different characters from famous iconic Kollywood movies and was asked to stage perform those characters and also live like that. |
| Week 5 | Punishments | None |
| Week 5 | House Captain | Varun Kamal was the Week 5 House Captain and was hence, exempted from the nomination process. |
| Week 5 | Safe contestants | Akshara, Ciby, Pavni, Iykki, Niroop, Abhinay, Isaivani, and Mathumitha were saved from Week 5 Elimination Process on Day 34 & 35. |
| Week 5 | Exits | Suruthi Periyasamy was evicted from the Bigg Boss House on Day 35 after receiving the fewest votes. |
| Week 6 | Entrances | None |
| Week 6 | Days | Day 36–42 |
| Week 6 | Twist | The sky medal was the powerful medal of Week 6, and the owner of the medal Pavni had full control over the living room area. |
| Week 6 | Nominations | Abhinay, Akshara, Ciby, Imman, Mathumitha, Pavni, and Raju were nominated for the Week 6 Eviction Process. |
| Week 6 | Captaincy Task | Neeum bommai Naanum bommai theriyum unmai: All the housemates were asked to run to a tent by picking a doll which had names of housemates. The last to go into will not be exempted but the name of the housemate in the doll will be exempted from captaincy. |
| Week 6 | Captaincy Task Results | |
| Week 6 | Winner: Abhinay Isaivani swapped the captaincy using FIRE power medal | |
| Week 6 | Defeat: Akshara, Mathumitha, Niroop Pavni, Priyanka and Varun | |
| Week 6 | Luxury Budget Task | Neeyum Bommai Naanum Bommai Theriyum Unmai: For the task, there was a circus tent built in the garden area. Dolls will send to them through the storeroom. They wanna get ready soon and place the dolls nearby the Bathroom Area. 12 takes buzzer will ring inside the hose. Whenever buzzer rings they wanna take someone's doll and enter into the tent. They are not allowed to take their own doll. Whom entering last in the tent holding Doll's owner will be out of the task. Like this, they wanna repeat this who stay longer will be the winner. They wanna nominate two-person who didn't perform well and who backstabbed them. |
| Week 6 | Punishments | Housemates selected two persons whom they thought to be not real. Raju, and Imman were punished. |
| Week 6 | House Captain | Isaivani was the Week 6 House Captain and hence, exempted from the nomination process. |
| Week 6 | Safe contestants | Raju, Akshara, Imman, Pavni, Ciby, and Abhinay were saved from Week 6 Elimination Process on Day 41 & 42. |
| Week 6 | Exits | Mathumitha Raghunathan was evicted from the Bigg Boss House on Day 42 after receiving the fewest votes. |
| Week 7 | Entrances | Abishek Raaja re–entered the House as a wildcard contestant on Day 47. |
| Week 7 | Days | Day 43–49 |
| Week 7 | Twist | The water medal was the powerful medal of Week 7, and the owner of the medal Varun had full control over the bathroom and garden room area |
| Week 7 | Nominations | Abhinay, Akshara, Ciby, Imman, Isaivani, Iykki, Niroop, Pavni, and Thamarai were nominated for the Week 7 Eviction Process. |
| Week 7 | Captaincy Task | All the housemates had to self–vote for their preferred captain within the four nominees (Ciby, Iykki, Niroop, and Priyanka). Gaining the most votes, Priyanka was elected the Captain of Week 7. |
| Week 7 | Captaincy Task Results | |
| Week 7 | Winner: Priyanka | |
| Week 7 | Defeat: Ciby, Iykki, and Niroop | |
| Week 7 | Luxury Budget Task | Ulladhai Ullapadi Kaatum Kannadi: Housemates had to pair in two's and mirror each other's actions throughout the week. Later on, the housemates came together on the platform and conveyed their opinion on their partners on the stage. They further earned badges if they performed the task well. Pairs: Akshara and Ciby, Abhinav and Niroop, Imman and Isaivani, Pavni and Raju, Priyanka and Thamarai, Iyikki and Varun. |
| Week 7 | Punishments | None |
| Week 7 | House Captain | Priyanka Deshpande was the Week 7 House Captain and was hence, exempted from the nomination process. |
| Week 7 | Safe contestants | Akshara, Ciby, Imman, Pavni, Iykki, Niroop, and Abhinay were saved from Week 7 Elimination Process on Day 48 & 49. |
| Week 7 | Exits | Isaivani was evicted from the Bigg Boss House on Day 49 after receiving the fewest votes. |
| Week 8 | Entrances | Amir, and Sanjeev Venkat entered the House as wildcard contestants respectively on Day 51 and 53. |
| Week 8 | Days | Day 50–56 |
| Week 8 | Twist | None |
| Week 8 | Nominations | Imman, Iykki, Niroop, Priyanka, Pavni, and Thamarai were nominated for the Week 8 Eviction Process. |
| Week 8 | Captaincy Task | The 6 housemates selected to compete for the captaincy (Abhinay, Akshara Imman, Varun, Raju, and Thamarai) had to stuff as much cotton into the boxes they were provided with. They had to weigh their boxes on the weighing scale and the housemate with the heaviest box would be selected as the Captain. With the heaviest box, Abhinay was elected the Captain of Week 8. |
| Week 8 | Captaincy Task Results | |
| Week 8 | Winner: Abhinay | |
| Week 8 | Defeat: Abhinay, Akshara, Imman, Raju, Thamarai and Varun | |
| Week 8 | Luxury Budget Task | Kanaa Kaanum Kaalangal: The Bigg Boss house was recreated as a school and the housemates assumed the role of characters working in a typical school. Headmaster: Ciby; Tamil Lecturer: Raju; Personal Development Teacher: Abishek; Physical Education Teacher: Amir; Leader of Physical Education Class: Akshara; Students: Abhinay, Akshara, Imman, Iykki, Niroop, Pavni, Priyanka, Thamarai, and Varun The other housemates assumed the role of classmates in the house. They had to obey the rules of the teachers and if they failed to do so, they will be punished by the headmaster. |
| Week 8 | Punishments | Amir and Niroop were sent to jail |
| Week 8 | House Captain | Abhinay Vaddi was the Week 8 House Captain and was hence, exempted from the nomination process. |
| Week 8 | Safe contestants | Priyanka, Imman, Pavni, Thamarai, and Niroop were saved from Week 8 Elimination Process on Day 55 & 56. |
| Week 8 | Exits | Iykki Berry was evicted from the Bigg Boss House on Day 56 after receiving the fewest votes. |
| Week 9 | Entrances | None |
| Week 9 | Days | Day 57–63 |
| Week 9 | Twist | None |
| Week 9 | Nominations | Abhinay, Abishek, Akshara, Ciby, Imman, Pavni, Priyanka, Raju, Thamarai, and Varun were nominated for the Week 9 Eviction Process. |
| Week 9 | Captaincy Task | The three contestants selected for Captaincy Task (Imman, Abishek, Ciby) had to build a tower with the help of cubes given by Bigg boss and protect it from the other housemates attack Imman won that task but Niroop exchanged the captaincy for him with the power of the coin |
| Week 9 | Captaincy Task Results | |
| Week 9 | Winner: Imman Niroop swapped the captaincy using EARTH power medal | |
| Week 9 | Defeat: Abishek, Ciby, Imman | |
| Week 9 | Luxury Budget Task | Bigg Boss Breaking News Task Everyone ads complaining 24 hours show but only telecasting for 1 hour. It's an opportunity to explain to the audience what actually happened in these 50 days and explain their side to them. Task name Bigg Boss Breaking News. Housemates wanna divide into two teams. Both teams wanna telecast different news. The team names are the Blue and Red TV teams. Both teams have two reporters and two News Readers. When they are collecting the news they wanna make sure it's against the opposite team. They can bring the person for an interview in their channel. The reporter will collect the news and newsreaders will read it. Sanjeev will be a judge and announce the result in the evening. They divide the team as Red and Blue. Team Blue: Akshara, Amir, Imman, Pavni, Raju, Thamarai; Team Red: Abhinay, Abishek, Ciby, Niroop, Priyanka, and Varun; Judge: Sanjeev |
| Week 9 | Punishments | Niroop, and Pavni were sent to jail. |
| Week 9 | House Captain | Niroop Nandakumar was the Week 9 House Captain and was hence, exempted from nomination process. |
| Week 9 | Safe contestants | Raju, Priyanka, Pavni, Ciby, Thamarai, Imman, Akshara, and Varun were saved from Week 9 Elimination Process on Day 62 & 63. |
| Week 9 | Exits | Abishek Raaja was re-evicted from the Bigg Boss House on Day 63 after receiving the fewest votes. |
| Week 10 | Entrances | None |
| Week 10 | Days | Day 64–70 |
| Week 10 | Twist | Niroop was given then chance to swap his nomination and replace his nomination with another housemate who isn't nominated, Niroop choose Sanjeev and they both were given a tie-breaker task and the one who loses the task will be nominated for eviction. |
| Week 10 | Nominations | Abhinay, Akshara, Amir, Ciby, Imman, Niroop, and Thamarai were nominated for the Week 10 Eviction Process. |
| Week 10 | Captaincy Task | All the contestants all selected to the captaincy task suthi suthi vanthinga had to run in a circle with music when the music stops they will sit in a chair at last who had the chair they will be the captain of the week Amir won the task but Pavni exchanged the captaincy with the help of the power of medal so Pavni is the captain of week 10 |
| Week 10 | Captaincy Task Results | |
| Week 10 | Winner: Amir Pavni swapped the captaincy using SKY power medal | |
| Week 10 | Defeat: The other housemates | |
| Week 10 | Luxury Budget Task | Bigg Boss Maanadu Housemates divide into Three political parties. They can complain inside the house and say to people what will they do for their house after that, they win the election. Team A: Abhinay, Amir, Pavni, and Priyanka; Team B: Ciby, Niroop, Raju, and Thamarai; Team C: Akshara, Imman Sanjeev, and Varun |
| Week 10 | Punishments | None |
| Week 10 | House Captain | Pavni Reddy was the Week 10 House Captain and was hence, exempted from the nomination process. |
| Week 10 | Safe contestants | Ciby, Akshara, Thamarai, Abhinay, Amir, and Niroop were saved from Week 10 Elimination Process on Day 69 & 70. |
| Week 10 | Exits | Imman Annachi was evicted from the Bigg Boss House on Day 70 after receiving the fewest votes. |
| Week 11 | Entrances | None |
| Week 11 | Days | Day 71–77 |
| Week 11 | Twist | All the housemates were automatically nominated in Week 10 for immunity-based challenges that were conducted as part of the Week 10 Luxury Budget Task. |
| Week 11 | Nominations | Abhinay, Akshara, Amir, Ciby, Niroop, Pavni, Priyanka, Raju, Sanjeev, Thamarai and Varun were automatically nominated for the Week 11 Eviction Process. Abhinay, Akshara, Pavni, Priyanka, Raju and Varun were nominated for the Week 11 Eviction Process, after all the immunity task. |
| Week 11 | Captaincy Task | None |
| Week 11 | Luxury Budget Task | 1st Immunity Task: Housemates have to arrange themselves in order from #1 to #12, Ciby stood in the #1 position and was exempted from the Week 10 nomination process. This week's task is to save the nominated contestant from nomination. 2nd Immunity Task: Housemates have to survive in a bus kept in a garden area overcoming all the hurdles. Housemates have to get down Voluteerly Or vote out when Bus horn is blown at each time. Later Niroop was stayed long on the bus and was exempted from the Week 10 nomination process. 3rd Immunity Task: Housemates have to stand in an ice cube tub and has to peel a potato kept in hot water and have to count for 5 minutes in mind while peeling off the potato. Whom finish counting in 5 minutes can stop their work and press the bell. Whom is nearly close to the 5 minutes counting will go to the next level and the higher one will be out of the game. Later Varun finishes it in 8.20 min. He came as last so he is out of the game. 4th Immunity Task: In the garden area equal balloons are given to the nominated contestant. They have to protect their ballons and also to decrease other participants' balloons also at the same time. Whom has fewer ballons will be out of the game rest all can go to the next level. Later Sanjeev balloons are broken first so he is out of the game. 5th Immunity Task: There are rings kept on a pedestal. When the buzzer plays they wanna throw that ring in the stand. Who has fewer rings will be out of the game. Later Priyanka is out of the game. 6th Immunity Task: Bigg Boss will show some pictures to the Housemates and have to notice and answer the question. Later Pavni is out of the game with the least scores. 7th Immunity Task: Nominated housemates photo printed dice kept in the garden area. When buzzer plays they wanna roll it whose picture coming in front will be out of the game. Later Akshara is out of the game. 8th Immunity Task: In the first stage they wanna finish drinking one bottle of water which is kept on the pedestal. In the second stage, they wanna crawl under the next. In the third stage, they wanna solve the puzzle. In the last stage, they wanna jump inside the sack and drink the raw egg without spitting it out and pressing the bell to finish it. Later Raju is out of the game. 9th Immunity Task: There is cow dung filled in the tub and kept in the Activity area. They wanna collect the coins from the Cow dung. Whom collect fewer coins will be out of the game. Later Amir is out of the game. 10th Immunity Task: It's a card game whose getting x mark will be out of the game. Later Abhinay is out of the game and Thamarai win the immunity task and was exempted from the Week 10 nomination process. 11th Immunity Task: Last chance for contestants to save themselves from nomination task, 8 nominated housemates have to divide into two teams. Amir and Pavni, Raju and Sanjeev, Akshara and Varun, Abhinay and Priyanka are the pairs. In the activity area, there is two booths were kept there. Bigg Boss asks both of them to enter the booth and keeps the headset in their ears. Bigg Boss says to them that they can save themselves or their partner in it. If both show the same picture then they are saved. Priyanka chooses herself, Abhinay chooses himself, Amir chooses himself, Pavni chooses Amir, Akshara chooses Varun, Varun chooses Akshara, Raju chooses Sanjeev and Sanjeev choose himself. Later Amir and Sanjeev were saved and were exempted from the Week 10 nomination process. |
| Week 11 | Punishments | None |
| Week 11 | House Captain | None |
| Week 11 | Safe contestants | Raju, Priyanka, Pavni, Akshara, and Varun were saved from Week 11 Elimination Process on Day 76 & 77. |
| Week 11 | Exits | Abhinay Vaddi was evicted from the Bigg Boss House on Day 77 after receiving the fewest votes |
| Week 12 | Guests Entrances | Akshara Reddy: Mother and Brother, Ciby Bhuvana Chandran: Father and Wife, Niroop Nandakumar: Father and Friend Raju Jeyamohan Mother and Wife, Pavni Reddy: Mother, Sister and Niece, Varun Kamal: Mother and Brother, Priyanka Deshpande: Mother and Brother, Thamarai Selvi: Son and Husband, Sanjeev Venkat: Wife, Son and Daughter, Amir: Family. |
| Week 12 | Days | Day 78–84 |
| Week 12 | Twist | None |
| Week 12 | Nominations | Akshara, Ciby, Niroop, Pavni, Priyanka, and Varun were nominated for the Week 12 Eviction Process. |
| Week 12 | Captaincy Task | Vitratheenga eppothume: All Housemates had to hold a long rope given by biggboss and has to hold without leaving the rope. Housemates leaving the rope will be disqualified from the captaincy task of this week.Later Thamarai won the task by holding the rope for 16 hours and becoming a captain of this week |
| Week 12 | Captaincy Task Results | |
| Week 12 | Winner: Thamarai Selvi | |
| Week 12 | Defeat: The other housemates | |
| Week 12 | Luxury Budget Task | Oru Kathai Sollatuma: Wildcards of the Bigg Boss House shared their past life, their sorrows, strengths, and how they achieved their dreams, with the other housemates. The other housemates have to paste a heart, like, or a dislike sticker if the housemate's story was relatable, inspirational, or non-inspirational. Freeze or Release Task: Bigg boss will take full control over the task. He will instruct the housemates by using words like freeze, release, rewind, fast forward, sleep mode, and loop. |
| Week 12 | Punishments | None |
| Week 12 | House Captain | Thamarai Selvi was the Week 12 House Captain and was hence, exempted from the nomination process. |
| Week 12 | Safe contestants | Priyanka, Pavni, Ciby, and Niroop were saved from Elimination Process on Day 83 & 84. |
| Week 12 | Exits | Varun Kamal and Akshara Reddy were evicted from the Bigg Boss House on Day 84 after receiving the fewest votes |
| Week 13 | Entrances | None |
| Week 13 | Days | Day 85–91 |
| Week 13 | Twist | Ticket to Finale announcement made. Just one housemate can make it to the Finale Week without facing a public vote for 2 weeks |
| Week 13 | Nominations | Amir, Ciby, Niroop, Priyanka, Pavni, Sanjeev, Thamarai, and Raju were automatically nominated for the Week 13 Eviction Process. Ciby, Niroop, Priyanka, Pavni, Sanjeev, Thamarai, and Rajuwere nominated for the Week 13 Eviction Process, after all the Ticket to Finale task. |
| Week 13 | Captaincy Task | None |
| Week 13 | Luxury Budget Task | Ticket to Finale tasks Contestants should compete in various challenges to earn the most points. The contestant who has the most points at the end of the week will automatically be saved until the Finale Week escaping public vote. Ticket to finale Task 1: They wanna give one black rose to a person who doesn't deserve to go to finals. Later Housemates decides to give the black rose to Niroop, and he is out of Ticket to Finale. Ticket to finale Task 2: They will give 10 eggs and a nest to the contestants equally. They wanna protect their egg as well as they wanna break others' eggs. Whom has less egg in their nest will be eliminated from this game. Later Pavni and Thamarai out of Ticket to Finale. Ticket to finale Task 3: Housemates cut out kept in the garden. Bigg Boss will say some questions to them. They wanna an answer to it while throwing the given egg to the cutout. Whose cut out has more colors will be evicted from this race. Later Priyanka and Raju out of Ticket to Finale. Ticket to finale Task 4: Housemates can also play in this task along with contestants. It's a Yes or No game. Housemates can able to raise their questions to the contestants. If contestants have the same answer as housemates they can take the first step forward. Who has fewer points will be out of the game. Later Sanjeev out of Ticket to Finale. Ticket to finale Task 5: Two frames were kept for Amir and Cibi in the garden area. Two sacks of sand were tied in the rope with a borderline. They wanna stand on the wooden stage and hold the sack rope. The important rule is they might stand in one leg they shouldn't chance their legs. If that sack goes out of the borderline that person will be evicted. Later Ciby out of Ticket to Finale and Amir won Ticket to Finale. |
| Week 13 | Ticket To Finale Winner : Amir | |
| Week 13 | Punishments | None |
| Week 13 | House Captain | None |
| Week 13 | Safe contestants | Raju, Priyanka, Pavni, Niroop, Thamarai, and Ciby were saved from Week 13 Elimination Process on Day 90 & 91. |
| Week 13 | Exits | Sanjeev Venkat was evicted from the Bigg Boss House on Day 91 after receiving the fewest votes. |
| Week 14 | Guests Entrances | Sarathkumar Ramanathan entered the House to challenge the contestants with a box of cash prize on Day 93. |
| Week 14 | Days | Days 92–98 |
| Week 14 | Twist | A housemate has the chance to take the money amount which starts off at 3 lakhs and increases to 12 lakhs. |
| Week 14 | Nominations | Ciby, Niroop, Priyanka, Pavni, Thamarai, and Raju were automatically nominated for the Week 14 Eviction Process. Niroop, Priyanka, Pavni, Thamarai, and Raju were nominated for the Week 14 Eviction Process, after the Cash Prize Eviction. |
| Week 14 | Captaincy Task | None |
| Week 14 | Luxury Budget Task | Bigg Boss reintroduces the Sacrifice-Dare task which originally started in Bigg Boss Season 1 and 2. Housemates will be given a dare and or a sacrifice which they must complete which will ensure their entrance to their Finale Week. 1st Sacrifice: Onions, salt, and sugar for the whole week. This may help them gain a special offer and luxury budget. 2nd Sacrifice: Housemates should give their favorite two sets of dresses to Orphanage. 1st Dare: All nominated housemates have to take a bath with water that was mixed with cow dung. |
| Week 14 | Punishments | None |
| Week 14 | House Captain | None |
| Week 14 | Safe contestants | Niroop was saved from the Week 14 Elimination Process on Day 97 after winning the Ticket To Finale. |
| Week 14 | Safe contestants | Raju, Priyanka and Pavni were saved from the Week 14 Elimination Process on Days 97 & 98 and became the finalists of Bigg Boss 5 Tamil. |
| Week 14 | Ticket To Finale Winners : Niroop, Raju, Priyanka, Pavni | |
| Week 14 | Exits | Ciby Bhuvana Chandran walked out after taking 12 lakh worth of money from the BB suitcase on Day 95. |
| Week 14 | Exits | Thamarai Selvi was evicted from the Bigg Boss House on Day 98 after receiving the fewest votes. |
| Week 15 Finale Week | Days | Days 98–105 |
| Week 15 Finale Week | Entrance (Housemates Reunion) | Nadia Chang, Suruthi Periyasamy, Ciby Bhuvana Chandran and Abhinay Vaddi entered the House as guests on Day 101. |
| Week 15 Finale Week | Entrance (Housemates Reunion) | Thamarai Selvi, Varun Kamal and Akshara Reddy entered the House as guests on Day 102 |
| Week 15 Finale Week | Happenings | Pongal Celebration on Day 103: Housemates celebrated the Pongal with wishing the audience by themselves.; Bigg boss had arranged a task where housemates joined and played them with winning Pongal gifs. |
| Week 15 Finale Week | Happenings | Bigg Boss asked Housemates to share their journey, as all housemates came in front and talked about it on Day 103. |
| Week 15 Finale Week | Happenings | All housemates gave 10 poses to the photo at garden area and then they enjoyed with dancing for songs which was played at the moment. Except Finalists, remained housemates who came as guests, left bb house after collecting gifts on Day 103. |
| Week 15 Finale Week | Happenings | At garden area, each finalist was shown their bb journey by a video separately only towards them on Day 104. |
| Week 15 Finale Week | Finalists | During the final week the public vote for who they want to win Bigg Boss. The finalists for the title were as following: Amir; Niroop Nandhakumar; Pavni Reddy; Priyanka Deshpande; Raju Jeyamohan |
Grand Finale Day 105
| 4th Runner Up | | Niroop Nandhakumar |
| 3rd Runner Up | | Amir |
| 2nd Runner Up | | Pavni Reddy |
| 1st Runner Up | | Priyanka Deshpande |
| Winner | | Raju Jeyamohan |

== BB Prison ==
Each week, housemates who did perform satisfactorily in the Luxury Budget Task, are sent to the Bigg Boss underground prison. The prison is devoid of any facilities except a bed and a water bucket.

| Week | In Prison | | | Day(s) |
|---|---|---|---|---|
| 1 | None | | | |
| 2 | None | | | |
| 3 | Niroop | Priyanka | Suruthi | Day 17 |
| 4 | None | | | |
| 5 | None | | | |
| 6 | None | | | |
| 7 | None | | | |
| 8 | Amir | | Niroop | Day 54 |
| 9 | Niroop | | Pavni | Day 61 |
| 10 | None | | | |
| 11 | None | | | |
| 12 | None | | | |
| 13 | None | | | |
| 14 | None | | | |
| 15 | None | | | |

Male housemates Female housemates

== Guest appearance ==
=== Through virtual contact ===
| Week(s) | Day(s) | Guest(s) | Purpose of visit |
| Week 3 | 19 | Harish Kalyan and Priya Bhavani Shankar | To promote their film Oh Manapenne! |
| Week 6 | 37 | Pavni reddy's Family and Friends | Pavni's birthday celebration |
| Week 11 | 77 | Hiphop Tamizha, T. G. Thyagarajan, Aswin Raam & Napolion | To promote their film Anbarivu |
| Week 12 | 81 | Varun Kamal's Family, Friends, Iykki Berry, Imman Annachi, Mathumitha Raghunathan, Dr. Ishari K. Ganesh | Varun's birthday celebration |
| Week 12 | 84 | Dr. Ishari K. Ganesh along with Varun Kamal | To Promote Their film Joshua Imai Pol Kaakha |
| Week 14 | 98 | Family to stay; Imman Annachi, Abishek Raaja, Akshara Reddy, Varun Kamal, Ciby Bhuvana Chandran and Suruthi Periyasamy | To stay there permanently |

=== Physical appearances ===
- Through glass house – T
- Direct entry – D * (Who entered directly to the BB house was quarantined before entering)

| Week(s) | Day(s) | Guest(s) | T or D | Purpose of visit |
| Week 5 | 33 | Madurai Muthu, Ma Ka Pa Anand, Sridhar Sena, Manasi, super singer crew and Bala | T | Diwali celebration |
| Week 12 | 79 | Akshara Reddy's Mother and Brother | D | As a part of the luxury budget task |
| Week 12 | 79 | Ciby Bhuvana Chandran's Father and Wife | D | As a part of the luxury budget task |
| Week 12 | 80 | Niroop Nandakumar's Father and Friend, Yashika Aannand | D | As a part of the luxury budget task |
| Week 12 | 80 | Raju Jeyamohan's Mother and Wife | D | As a part of the luxury budget task |
| Week 12 | 81 | Pavni Reddy's Mother, Sister and Niece | D | As a part of the luxury budget task |
| Week 12 | 81 | Varun Kamal's Mother and Brother | D | As a part of the luxury budget task |
| Week 12 | 81 | Priyanka Deshpande's Mother and Brother | D | As a part of the luxury budget task |
| Week 12 | 82 | Thamarai Selvi's Husband and Son | D | As a part of the luxury budget task |
| Week 12 | 82 | Sanjeev Venkat's Wife, Son and Daughter | D | As a part of the luxury budget task |
| Week 12 | 83 | Amir's Family | D | As a part of the luxury budget task |
| Week 14 | 93 | Sarathkumar | T | To challenge the contestants with a box of cash prize |
| Week 15 | Day 102 | Cast of TV shows; Senthoora Poove and Eeramana Rojave | T | To carry out special tasks |
| Week 15 | Day 101–104 | Nadia Chang, Suruthi Periyasamy, Ciby Bhuvana Chandran and Abhinay Vaddi | D | To spend the last few days with the rest of the contestants and celebrate Pongal (festival). |
| Week 15 | Day 102–104 | Thamarai Selvi, Varun Kamal and Akshara Reddy | D | To spend the last few days with the rest of the contestants and celebrate Pongal (festival). |
|---|---|---|---|---|
| Week 15 | Day 105 | Kamal Haasan | D | To escort finalists Raju Jeyamohan and Priyanka Deshpande and light off the bb house. |

== Nomination table ==
| | Week 1 | Week 2 | Week 3 | Week 4 | Week 5 | Week 6 | Week 7 | Week 8 | Week 9 | Week 10 | Week 11 | | Week 12 | Week 13 | | Week 14 | | | Week 15 | | | |
| | Week 1 | Week 2 | Week 3 | Week 4 | Week 5 | Week 6 | Week 7 | Week 8 | Week 9 | Week 10 | Day 71 | Day 72 | Week 12 | Day 85 | Day 85 | Day 92 | Day 93 | Day 96 | Day 102 | Day 103 | Day 104 | Day 105 |
|---|---|---|---|---|---|---|---|---|---|---|---|---|---|---|---|---|---|---|---|---|---|---|
| Nominees for Captaincy | None | All; Housemates | Ciby; Imman; Isaivani; Pavni; Raju | All; Housemates | Ciby; Raju | Abhinay; Akshara; Mathumitha; Niroop; Pavni; Priyanka; Varun | Ciby; Iykki; Niroop; Priyanka | Abhinay; Akshara; Imman; Raju; Thamarai; Varun | Abishek; Ciby; Imman | All; Housemates | None | | All; Housemates | None | | | | | | | | |
| House Captain | No; Captain | Thamarai | Ciby | Mathumitha | Ciby | Abhinay | Priyanka | Abhinay | Imman | Amir | No; Captain | | Thamarai | No; Captain | | | | | | | | |
| House Captain | No; Captain | Thamarai | Ciby | Mathumitha | Varun | Isaivani | Priyanka | Abhinay | Niroop | Pavni | No; Captain | | Thamarai | No; Captain | | | | | | | | |
| Captain's Nomination | No; Nominations | Chinnaponnu; Mathumitha | Priyanka; Abishek | Isaivani; Iykki | Thamarai; Akshara | Akshara; Mathumitha; Imman | Iykki; Imman; Akshara | Imman; Thamarai | Ciby; Varun; Imman | Raju; Thamarai; Akshara | No; Nominations | | Niroop; Pavni; Priyanka | No Nominations | | | | | | | | |
| Power Medal of the week | None | | | Fire Medal | Earth Medal | Sky Medal | Water Medal | None | | | | | | | | | | | | | | |
| Owner of Power Medal | None | | | Isaivani | Niroop | Pavni | Varun | None | | | | | | | | | | | | | | |
| Power Medal Destroyed | None | | | | Air Medal | None | Fire Medal | None | | | | | | | | | | | | | | |
| Vote to: | None | Evict | | | Save | Evict | | | | | | Task | Evict | | Task | Evict | Cash Prize Eviction | Evict | WIN | | | |
| Raju | No Nominations | Abhinay; Priyanka | Chinnaponnu; Pavni | Pavni; Abhinay | Imman; Niroop | Niroop; Priyanka; Thamarai | Pavni; Abhinay; Iykki | Priyanka; Iykki | Pavni; Abhinay; Varun | Abhinay; Niroop; Akshara | Nominated | Lost Immunity Task #8 (Nominated) | Niroop; Pavni; Ciby | Niroop; Pavni | Lost Ticket to finale Task #3 (Nominated) | Pavni (to evict); Ciby (to evict); Priyanka (to save); Niroop (to evict); Amir (to evict); Thamarai (to save) | Rejected Cash Prize Eviction | Nominated | Nominated | No; Nominations | Finalist (Nominated) | Winner (Day 105) |
| Priyanka | No Nominations | Akshara; Iykki | Chinnaponnu; Suruthi | Suruthi; Chinnaponnu | Mathumitha; Isaivani | Iykki; Imman; Raju | House; Captain | Imman; Akshara | Imman; Raju; Akshara | Akshara; Thamarai; Niroop | Nominated | Lost Immunity Task #5 (Nominated) | Ciby; Varun; Sanjeev | Sanjeev; Niroop | Lost Ticket to finale Task #3 (Nominated) | Thamarai; Niroop | Rejected Cash Prize Eviction | Nominated | Walked (Day 102) | | Finalist (Nominated) | 1st runner-up (Day 105) |
| Pavni | No Nominations | Niroop; Ciby | Akshara; Abishek | Niroop; Akshara | Suruthi; Abhinay | Thamarai; Iykki; Raju | Iykki; Thamarai; Akshara | Raju; Thamarai | Raju; Akshara; Thamarai | House; Captain | Nominated | Lost Immunity Task #6 (Nominated) | Akshara; Varun; Ciby | Niroop; Thamarai | Lost Ticket to finale Task #2 (Nominated) | Raju; Ciby | Rejected Cash Prize Eviction | Nominated | Nominated | No; Nominations | Finalist (Nominated) | 2nd runner-up (Day 105) |
| Amir | Not In House | | | | | | | | Thamarai; Akshara; Abishek | Imman; Akshara; Thamarai | Nominated | Lost Immunity Task 9th (Nominated) | Niroop; Akshara; Priyanka | Sanjeev; Pavni | Won Ticket to Finale (Finalist) | Raju; Thamarai | Rejected Cash Prize Eviction | Finalist | Nominated | No; Nominations | Finalist (Nominated) | 3rd runner-up (Day 105) |
| Niroop | No Nominations | Abhinay; Varun | Akshara; Thamarai | Akshara; Chinnaponnu | Imman; Priyanka | Abhinay; Raju; Akshara | Varun; Ciby; Akshara | Thamarai; Varun | House; Captain | Sanjeev; Ciby; Amir | Nominated | Won Immunity Task #2 (Saved) | Varun; Ciby; Priyanka | Ciby; Raju | Lost Ticket to finale Task #1 (Nominated) | Ciby; Thamarai | Rejected Cash Prize Eviction | Nominated | Nominated | No; Nominations | Finalist (Nominated) | 4th runner-up (Day 105) |
| Thamarai | No Nominations | House; Captain | Pavni; Abhinay | Imman; Ciby | Raju; Iykki | Abhinay; Pavni; Imman | Pavni; Isaivani; Ciby | Priyanka; Pavni | Priyanka; Pavni; Ciby | Priyanka; Abhinay; Imman | Nominated | Won Immunity Task #10 (Saved) | House; Captain | Pavni; Niroop | Lost Ticket to finale Task #2 (Nominated) | Priyanka; Niroop | Rejected Cash Prize Eviction | Nominated | Evicted (Day 98) | | | |
| Ciby | No Nominations | Imman; Isaivani | House; Captain | Isaivani; Suruthi | Mathumitha; Imman | Varun; Akshara; Abhinay | Iykki; Akshara; Niroop | Niroop; Iykki | Thamarai; Akshara; Abishek | Niroop; Varun; Imman | Nominated | Won Immunity Task #1 (Saved) | Akshara; Pavni; Niroop | Niroop; Amir | Lost Ticket to finale Task #5 (Nominated) | Niroop; Raju | Accepted Cash Prize Eviction (₹12,00,000) | Evicted with ₹12L (Day 95) | | | | |
| Sanjeev | Not In House | | | | | | | | Pavni; Priyanka; Raju | Niroop; Abhinay; Imman | Nominated | Lost Immunity Task #4 (Nominated) | Ciby; Priyanka; Pavni | Priyanka; Amir | Lost Ticket to finale Task #4 (Nominated) | Evicted (Day 91) | | | | | | |
| Varun | No Nominations | Isaivani; Chinnaponnu | Niroop; Abishek | Chinnaponnu; Abhinay | House; Captain | Pavni; Abhinay; Ciby | Niroop; Pavni; Isaivani | Niroop; Priyanka | Abhinay; Pavni; Ciby | Amir; Niroop; Abhinay | Nominated | Lost Immunity Task #3 (Nominated) | Priyanka; Niroop; Amir | Evicted (Day 84) | | | | | | | | |
| Akshara | No Nominations | Isaivani; Suruthi | Abishek; Pavni | Pavni; Priyanka | Thamarai; Iykki | Ciby; Imman; Pavni | Ciby; Imman; Niroop | Priyanka; Niroop | Ciby; Priyanka; Abishek | Priyanka; Amir; Ciby | Nominated | Lost Immunity Task #7 (Nominated) | Priyanka; Pavni; Amir | Evicted (Day 84) | | | | | | | | |
| Abhinay | No Nominations | Isaivani; Raju | Isaivani; Thamarai | Chinnaponnu; Thamarai | Priyanka; Raju | Imman; Ciby; Raju | Imman; Niroop; Iykki | House; Captain | Imman; Raju; Varun | Raju; Amir; Imman | Nominated | Lost Immunity Task #10 (Nominated) | Evicted (Day 77) | | | | | | | | | |
| Imman | No Nominations | Abhinay; Ciby | Isaivani; Pavni | Chinnaponnu; Isaivani | Raju; Niroop | Priyanka; Akshara; Mathumitha | Abhinay; Pavni; Thamarai | Priyanka; Pavni | Abishek; Priyanka; Pavni | Abhinay; Amir; Ciby | Evicted (Day 70) | | | | | | | | | | | |
| Abishek | No Nominations | Nadia; Akshara | Akshara; Chinnaponnu | Evicted (Day 21) | | | | Imman; Thamarai | Varun; Imman; Akshara | Evicted (Day 63) | | | | | | | | | | | | |
| Iykki | No Nominations | Abishek; Niroop | Priyanka; Abishek | Pavni; Suruthi | Thamarai; Imman | Pavni; Mathumitha; Ciby | Pavni; Isaivani; Ciby | Ciby; Pavni | Evicted (Day 56) | | | | | | | | | | | | | |
| Isaivani | No Nominations | Chinnaponnu; Imman | Abhinay; Priyanka | Akshara; Imman | Thamarai; Suruthi | House; Captain | Thamarai; Iykki; Imman | Evicted (Day 49) | | | | | | | | | | | | | | |
| Mathumitha | No Nominations | Isaivani; Niroop | Thamarai; Iykki | House; Captain | Priyanka; Pavni | Akshara; Varun; Raju | Evicted (Day 42) | | | | | | | | | | | | | | | |
| Suruthi | No Nominations | Akshara; Niroop | Imman; Iykki | Akshara; Varun | Thamarai; Isaivani | Evicted (Day 35) | | | | | | | | | | | | | | | | |
| Chinnaponnu | No Nominations | Isaivani; Imman | Abishek; Pavni | Priyanka; Varun | Evicted (Day 28) | | | | | | | | | | | | | | | | | |
| Nadia | No Nominations | Niroop; Imman | Evicted (Day 14) | | | | | | | | | | | | | | | | | | | |
| Namitha | No Nominations | Walked (Day 6) | | | | | | | | | | | | | | | | | | | | |
| Against Public Vote | No; Nominations | Abhinay; Abishek; Akshara; Chinnaponnu; Ciby; Imman; Iykki; Isaivani; Mathumitha; Nadia; Niroop; Priyanka; Raju; Suruthi; Varun | Abhinay; Abishek; Akshara; Chinnaponnu; Iykki; Isaivani; Pavni; Priyanka; Thamarai | Abhinay; Akshara; Chinnaponnu; Imman; Isaivani; Pavni; Priyanka; Suruthi; Varun | Abhinay; Akshara; Ciby; Isaivani; Iykki; Mathumitha; Niroop; Pavni; Suruthi | Abhinay; Akshara; Ciby; Imman; Mathumitha; Pavni; Raju | Abhinay; Akshara; Ciby; Imman; Isaivani; Iykki; Niroop; Pavni; Thamarai | Imman; Iykki; Niroop; Pavni; Priyanka; Thamarai | Abhinay; Abishek; Akshara; Ciby; Imman; Pavni; Priyanka; Raju; Thamarai; Varun | Abhinay; Akshara; Amir; Ciby; Imman; Niroop; Thamarai | Abhinay; Akshara; ~~Amir~~; ~~Ciby~~; ~~Niroop~~; Pavni; Priyanka; Raju; ~~Sanjeev~~; ~~Thamarai~~; Varun | | Akshara; Ciby; Niroop; Pavni; Priyanka; Varun | ~~Amir~~; Ciby; Niroop; Pavni; Priyanka; Raju; Sanjeev; Thamarai | | Ciby; Niroop; Pavni; Priyanka; Raju; Thamarai | | ~~Niroop~~; Pavni; Priyanka; Raju; Thamarai | Amir; Niroop; Pavni; Priyanka; Raju | | | |
| Re-entered | None | | | | | Abishek | None | | | | | | | | | | | | | | | |
| Walked | Namitha | None | | | | | | | | | | | | | | | | | | | | |
| BB prison permanently closed | None | | Niroop; Priyanka; Suruthi | None | | | | Amir; Niroop | Niroop; Pavni | None | | | | | | | | | | | | |
| Punishment | None | | | Abhinay; Mathumitha; Pavni; Varun | None | Raju; Imman | None | | | | | | | | | | | | | | | |
| Evicted | No; Eviction | Nadia | Abishek | Chinnaponnu | Suruthi | Mathumitha | Isaivani | Iykki | Abishek | Imman | Abhinay | | Akshara | | Sanjeev | | Ciby | Thamarai | Niroop | Amir | | Pavni |
| Evicted | No; Eviction | Nadia | Abishek | Chinnaponnu | Suruthi | Mathumitha | Isaivani | Iykki | Abishek | Imman | Abhinay | | Varun | | Sanjeev | | Ciby | Thamarai | Priyanka | | | Raju |

== Notes ==
indicates that the housemate was directly nominated for eviction.
indicates the housemate was immuned from nominations.
indicates the nominees for the House Captaincy.
indicates the House Captain.
indicates the Former House Captain. (House Captain would have been stripped of the captaincy i.e., evicted/ejected/walked out after being nominated as the Captain)
indicates the Trending Player.
indicates a new wildcard contestant.
indicates the contestant is nominated.
indicates that the contestant has re-entered the house.
indicates that the contestant walked out of the Bigg Boss house on their own.
indicates the contestant has been ejected.
indicates the contestant has been evicted.
indicates the housemate evicted themselve after accepting a cash prize eviction .
indicates the winner.
indicates the first runner-up.
indicates the second runner-up.
indicates the third runner-up.
indicates the fourth runner-up.
