= Nizhal =

Nizhal (lit. 'shadow') may refer to:

- Nizhal (film), a 2021 Indian Malayalam-language mystery thriller film
- Nizhal (TV series), an Indian Tamil-language soap opera
