= Marumagal (TV series) =

- Title card
- Genre: Drama
- Written by: Kumarasamy Selvabharathi
- Screenplay by: Kumarasamy Selvabharathi; S. Balamurugan Dhakshinamoorthy Ramar (dialogues)
- Directed by: Narayanamoorthy (1-199); Kuruvithurai K.J.Thangapandian (200-present)
- Starring: Gabriella Charlton; Rahul Ravi
- Opening theme: "Vaa Vaa Marumagale Magale"; Srinidhi Sriprakash (vocals); Thozhan (lyrics)
- Composer: Vizu
- Country of origin: India
- Original language: Tamil
- No. of seasons: 1
- No. of episodes: 670+

Production
- Producer: Udayasankar
- Production location: Chennai
- Cinematography: Srinivasan
- Editor: Sajin C
- Camera setup: Multi-camera
- Running time: Approx. 20–22 minutes per episode
- Production company: Aura Creations

Original release
- Network: Sun TV
- Release: 10 June 2024 – present

Marumagal (transl. Daughter-in-law) is an Indian Tamil television drama starring Gabriella Charlton and Rahul Ravi. The series is directed by Kuruvithurai K.J.Thangapandian. It premiered on 10 June 2024 airing on Sun TV. It is also available on the digital platform Sun NXT.

== Synopsis ==
The story revolves around two dissimilar people, Aathirai and Prabhu, who are forced to marry.

== Cast ==
=== Main ===
- Gabriella Charlton as Aadhirai Prabhu: Sivaprakasam and Gowri's daughter; Prabhu's wife; stepdaughter of Manohari; stepsister of Jegan and Agalya
- Rahul Ravi as Prabhu Thillainathan: son of Thillainathan and Maragatham; Aathirai's husband; brother of Karthik, Rohini and Revathi

=== Recurring ===
- Mounika Subramanyam as Sathyapriya "Sathya" Karthik: Karthik's wife
- Santhosh Daniel as Karthik Thillainathan: Thillainathan and Maragatham's son; Sathya's husband; brother of Prabhu, Rohini and Revathi
- Narasimha Raju as Thillainathan "Thilla": Maragatham's husband; father of Prabhu, Karthik, Rohini and Revathi
- Premi as Maragatham: Thillainathan's mother; grandmother of Prabhu, Karthik, Rohini and Revathi
- Abinaya as Rohini Kumaruru: daughter of Thillainathan and Maragatham;Kumaruru's husband sister of Prabhu, Karthik and Revathi
- Deepika as Revathi Thillainathan: daughter of Thillainathan and Maragatham; sister of Prabhu, Karthik and Rohini
- Umarani / Anjali Varadharajan as Tamilarasi "Tamil": sister of Thillainathan and Ekambaram
- Ravi Chandran as Sivaprakasam "Siva": husband of Gowri and Manohari; father of Aathirai, Jegan and Agalya; friend of Thillainathan
- Sangeetha Balan as Sornakka "Sornam": Sathyapriya's aunt
- Ragavi Sasikumar as Manohari Sivaprakasam: Sivaprakasam's second wife; stepmother of Aathirai; mother of Jegan and Agalya
- Tamil Selvan as Jegan "Jega" Sivaprakasam: son of Sivaprakasam and Manohari; stepbrother of Aathirai
- Susmitha Suresh as Agalya Sivaprakasam: daughter of Sivaprakasam and Manohari; stepsister of Aathirai
- Ilavarasan as Ekambaram: Manimegalai's husband; father of Velvizhi
- Jeevitha as Manimegalai Ekambaram: Ekambaram's wife; mother of Velvizhi
- Sophia as Velvizhi Gowtham:daughter of Ekambaram and Manimegalai; Gowtham's husband
- VJ Vijay / Harish G as Saaminathan "Saamy": Prabhu's best friend
- Anisha Ishwarya as Thenmozhi
- Rajeshwari as Thenmozhi's mother
- Anbarasi as Priya: Aathirai's friend
- VJ Sam as Senthil
- Thuraisamy

=== Special Appearance ===
- Moondru Mudhichu family members in Mahasangamam and Megasangamam (2025;2026)
- Singapennae family members in Megasangamam (2026)
- Kayal family members in Megasangamam and Mahasangamam (2025;2026)
- Annam family members in Megasangamam (2025)
- Maanya Anand as Kanmani (Guest in Annam & Kayal & Marumagal Megasangamam) (2025)
- Keerthi Vijay as Ponmani (Guest in Annam & Kayal & Marumagal Megasangamam) (2025)
- Y. G. Mahendran as Sakthivel Kalingarayar (Guest in Annam & Kayal & Marumagal Megasangamam) (2025)
- Sekar Raja as Duraisingam (Guest in Annam & Kayal & Marumagal Megasangamam) (2025)
- GV Krishna as Dinesh (Guest in Annam & Kayal & Marumagal Megasangamam) (2025)
- TSR Srinivasan as Aarumugam (Guest in Annam & Kayal & Marumagal Megasangamam) (2025)
- Meenakshi Muruha as Aarumagam's wife (Guest in Annam & Kayal & Marumagal Megasangamam) (2025)

== Production ==
=== Development ===
The series was announced by Sun TV on begin February 2024. The series is will produced by Aura Creations, who produced shows such as Vanathai Pola and Anandha Ragam.

=== Casting ===
Actress Gabriella Charlton was cast in the female lead role as Aathirai, marking her return after Eeramana Rojave 2. Rahul Ravi was cast in the male lead role as Prabhu, marking his return after Kannana Kanne.

=== Release ===
The first promo was released on 27 May 2024, featuring Gabriella Charlton and Rahul Ravi. The second and third promos were unveiled on 3 and 9 June, which gave insight into Hero Heroine lives and revealing the release date.

The show started airing on Sun TV on 10 June 2024 From Monday to Saturday, replacing Ethirneechal serial.

== Adaptations ==
Language	Title	Original release	Network(s)	Last aired	Notes	Ref.
Tamil	Marumagal மருமகள்	10 June 2024	Sun TV	Ongoing	Original	
Telugu	Nuvve Kavali నువ్వే కావాలి	23 September 2024	Gemini TV	20 June 2025	Remake	
Malayalam	Aathira ആതിര	13 January 2025	Surya TV	6 April 2025	Remake	
Kannada	Ratha Sapthami ರಥ ಸಪ್ತಮಿ	8 December 2025	Udaya TV	15 August 2026	Remake	

== Reception ==
The show had a TVR of 8.55 on launching week on 10 June 2024.
