= Pavithra Janani =

Indian television actress (born Jan 31,1995)

- Born: Pavithra Janani; 30 January 1995 (age 31); Chennai, Tamil Nadu, India
- Occupation: Actress
- Years active: 2014–present
- Known for: Eeramana Rojave; Thendral Vandhu Ennai Thodum

Pavithra Janani (born 30 January 1995) is an Indian actress, who predominantly works in Tamil television. Pavithra is best known for her role, Malar vizhi Vetrivel on Star Vijay's soap opera Eeramana Rojave. In 2024, she participated in the reality show Bigg Boss 8 where she emerged as 3rd runner-up.

Pavithra is also known for her roles in the television shows Saravanan Meenatchi, Office, Raja Rani, Mahabharatham and Pagal Nilavu.

== Career ==
Pavithra started her career in 2013 with Sun TV's mythology drama series Mahabharatham, where she played the role of queen Gandhari. She later played supporting roles in Star Vijay's workplace comedy television series Office and family drama Saravanan Meenatchi playing the dual role of Janani and Tulasi.

In 2018, she played Malarvizhi Vetrivel in Star Vijay's Eeramana Rojave opposite Dhiraviam Rajakumaran. From 2021 to 2023, she played Abhinaya in Star Vijay's Thendral Vandhu Ennai Thodum opposite Vinoth Babu, for which she received wide acclaim for her role as well as the pairing.

In 2024, Pavithra participated in the reality show Bigg Boss 8, where she finished as third runner up.

== Television ==
Year	Title	Role	Notes	Ref.
2013 – 2016	Mahabharatham	Queen Gandhari		
2014 – 2015	Office	Vanitha		
2014-2017	Kalyanam Mudhal Kadhal Varai	Kavya Karthick		
2015	Nizhal	Pooja		
2015-2016	Saravanan Meenatchi	Janani/Tulasi		
2015–2017	Lakshmi Vandhachu	Gayatri		
2015–2017	Mella Thirandhathu Kadhavu	Indhu		
2015–2018	Kula Deivam	Shruthi		
2016 – 2018	Saravanan Meenatchi season 3	Rajeswari Veluchamy		
2016–2019	Pagal Nilavu	Karthika		
2017–2018	Raja Rani	Divya		
2018–2021	Eeramana Rojave	Malarvizhi Vetrivel	Lead female role	
2021–2023	Thendral Vandhu Ennai Thodum	IAS Abhinaya	Lead female role	
2022	Oo Solriya Oo Oohm Solriya	Contestant		
2024–2025	Bigg Boss 8	Contestant	3rd runner-up	

== See also ==
- List of Indian television actresses
