= Demon (2023 film) =

- Theatrical release poster
- Directed by: Ramesh Pazhaniivel
- Written by: Ramesh Pazhaniivel
- Produced by: R. Somasundaram
- Starring: Sachin Mani; Abarnathi; Suruthi Periyasamy
- Cinematography: R. S. Anandakumar
- Edited by: Ravikumar M.
- Music by: Ronnie Raphael
- Production company: Window Boys Pictures
- Distributed by: Blockbuster Production
- Release date: 22 September 2023
- Country: India
- Language: Tamil

Demon is a 2023 Indian Tamil-language horror film directed by Ramesh Pazhaniivel and produced by R. Somasundaram. The film stars Sachin Mani and Abarnathi, with Suruthi Periyasamy, Kumki Aswin and Raveena Daha in supporting roles. The film's music is composed by Ronnie Raphael, while the cinematography is handled by R. S. Anandakumar and editing is by Ravikumar M.

== Cast ==
- Sachin Mani as Vignesh Shivan
- Abarnathi as Karthika
- Suruthi Periyasamy as Jessy
- Ashvin Raja as Aswin
- Raveena Daha as Mahima

== Production ==
The first look poster of the film was released by Vijay Sethupathi and Mysskin in February 2023. The film is the directorial debut of Ramesh Pazhaniivel. The film was scheduled for release on 1 September 2023, later it was postponed and released on 22 September 2023.

== Reception ==
A critic of Dina Thanthi wrote that director Ramesh Palanivel has written the incident that happened in reality with the screen language of the cinema and in the second half, with an unexpected twist, he has made the fans look back. Ananda Vikatan critic gave a mixed review. Aswin Devan of Cinema Express rated two stars out of five and stated that "A shining aspect of Demon is undoubtedly Sachin's performance, which is head and shoulders above the majority of the cast, who deliver subpar performances." Logesh Balachandran of The Times of India gave two stars out of five and stated that " The technical aspects of the film are average, perhaps due to budget constraints."
