= Oh Butterfly =

- Theatrical release poster
- Directed by: Vijay Ranganathan
- Written by: Vijay Ranganathan
- Produced by: Vennky; Anand S Shah; Vijay Ranganathan; Nisha Patial
- Starring: Nivedhithaa Sathish; Ciby Bhuvana Chandran
- Cinematography: Vedaraman Sankaran
- Edited by: Bhuvanesh Manivannan
- Music by: Vaisakh Somanath
- Production companies: Anthill Cinema; Palampur Talkies
- Release date: 6 March 2026
- Running time: 132 minutes
- Country: India
- Language: Tamil

Oh Butterfly is a 2026 Indian Tamil-language romantic psychological thriller film written, co-produced, and directed by Vijay Ranganathan. The film stars Nivedhithaa Sathish and Ciby Bhuvana Chandran, with Attul, Nassar, Lakshmi Priyaa Chandramouli, Geetha Kailasam and Jananni in supporting roles. It is about a woman who brings her husband to her isolated hill station house to confess details about her past, but the unexpected arrival of her ex-boyfriend, invited unknowingly by her husband, leads to adverse consequences.

Oh Butterfly is the directorial debut of Vijay Ranganathan. The film, primarily shot in Kotagiri, was released in theatres on 6 March 2026 and was not a box office success.

== Plot ==
Gouri has obsessive–compulsive disorder. She brings her husband Arjun to her isolated hill station house to confess details about her past. However, the unexpected arrival of her ex-boyfriend Suriya, invited unknowingly by Arjun, leads to adverse consequences

== Cast ==
- Nivedhithaa Sathish as Gouri
- Ciby Bhuvana Chandran as Suriya
- Attul as Arjun
- Nassar as Sagayam
- Lakshmi Priyaa Chandramouli as Ranjani
- Geetha Kailasam as Soda Buddi Kezhavi
- Jananni as Soda Buddi Kezhavi's granddaughter
- Parameswari S. as Pushpa
- R Rajkumar as the carpenter

== Production ==
Oh Butterfly is the directorial debut of Vijay Ranganathan. He said the film's title was a reference to the Butterfly effect theory, and described it as a "relationship thriller", a genre he felt was rarely explored in Tamil cinema. Ciby Chandran revealed that no character in the film can be classified as positive or negative as "each character would have something to justify their actions in the narrative". Vijay initially wanted to title the film as Moondru Mudichu (transl. Three Knots), referencing the 1976 film directed by K. Balachander, and said it was influenced by Balachander's films but modernised. Oh Butterfly was primarily shot at Kotagiri, and the team opted for live sound.

== Music ==
The music was composed by Vaisakh Somanath.

Track listing
No.	Title	Lyrics	Singer(s)	Length
1.	"Pogaadhe"	Vignesh Srikanth	Kapil Kapilan	4:12
2.	"The Butterfly Theme"	Karthik Netha	Shakthisree Gopalan, Nanda J Devan, Vaisakh Somanath	4:02
3.	"Tururu"	Karthik Netha	Haricharan	3:36
4.	"Suzhal"	Vijay Ranganathan	Vaikom Vijayalakshmi	2:45
5.	"Aagaya Neelam"	Vijay Ranganathan	Vaisakh Somanath, Alisha Mathew Thayil	4:12
Total length:				18:47

== Release and reception ==
Oh Butterfly was released on 6 March 2026. The film received an A certificate (adults only) from the Central Board of Film Certification, with the X account of Anthill Cinema tweeting, "A is for Adults with a past. A is for Awkward truths. A is for After midnight conversations. An A-certificate for A-grade tension".

Bhuvanesh Chandar of The Hindu wrote, "at a time when Tamil films seem too eager to achieve greater heights, this is a film that manages to stir something strong in you by merely flapping its wings and seems all the more content with the heights it soars". Vishal Menon of The Hollywood Reporter India wrote, "Oh Butterfly might not be compelling cinema from the word go, but its appeal lies in making you see layers within deeply flawed people and the prisons they build for themselves". Jayabhuvaneshwari B of Cinema Express rated the film three out of five stars and wrote, "the film creates a sense of claustrophobia, drawing us into uncomfortable truths and keeping us intrigued, even as it occasionally tests our patience". Abhinav Subramanian of The Times of India wrote, "Oh Butterfly has the craft to unsettle you. It just doesn't have the script to stay with you".
