= Sachin Mani =

Indian film actor

- Born: Chennai, India
- Occupation: Actor
- Years active: 2013-present

Sachin Mani is an Indian film actor who works in Tamil films.

== Career ==
Sachin first appeared in Chennaiyil Oru Naal (2013), a multi-narrative thriller that intertwined multiple stories around one particular incident that had taken place in Chennai. He portrayed the role of Karthik, an aspiring TV journalist, and the love interest of the character portrayed by Parvathy Thiruvothu. The film opened to positive reviews and performed well at the box office. He played the lead role in Kaathiruppor Pattiyal (2018), a romantic drama, where he featured alongside Nandita Swetha. In 2028, he worked on 46, a film on illegal bike racing in Chennai. The project garnered attention after sound engineer Resul Pookutty became attached to the venture, though production was halted thereafter. In 2019, Sachin played the lead role in the web series, D7, directed by Ganesh Vinayak.

In 2023, Sachin portrayed the antagonist in Beginning, before appearing in the lead role of the psychological thriller Demon. A critic from Times of India noted his performance was "engaging". He played a minor role in Leo, directed by Lokesh Kanagaraj. He will next be seen in Vasuvin Garbinigal.

== Filmography ==
=== Film ===
Year	Film	Role	Notes
2013	Chennaiyil Oru Naal	Karthik Vishwanathan	
2018	Kaathiruppor Pattiyal	Sathya	
2023	Beginning		
2023	Demon	Vignesh Shivan	
2023	Leo	Shruthi's husband	

=== Television ===
Year	Film	Role	Platform
2019	D7		ZEE5
