= Kaathodu Kaathoram =

Indian 2023 Malayalam-language soap opera

- Genre: Drama; Family drama
- Based on: Eeramana Rojave
- Written by: Gireesh Gramika
- Directed by: Praveen Kadakkavoor (2023); Sujith Sundar (2023-2024); Manoj Ganesh (2024)
- Country of origin: India
- Original language: Malayalam
- No. of seasons: 1
- No. of episodes: 351

Production
- Producer: Chitra Shenoy
- Cinematography: Krishna Kodanadu
- Editor: Selvaraj Kurumbumkara
- Camera setup: Multi-camera
- Running time: approx. 22–24 minutes per episode
- Production company: Good company productions

Original release
- Network: Asianet
- Release: 3 July 2023 – 13 September 2024

Related
- Eeramana Rojave

Kaathodu Kaathoram was an Indian Malayalam language television soap opera that aired from 3 July 2023 to 13 September 2024 on Asianet and streams on Disney+ Hotstar. Rahul Suresh and Krishnendhu Unnikrishnan plays the lead pair in the series. It is the third production of Good Company Productions after Kudumbavilakku. It is an official remake of the Tamil series Eeramana Rojave.

== Plot ==
Mahendran and Rajendran were good friends but they are living as enemies for several years. Aadi is the elder son of Mahendran and Meenu, a school teacher, is elder daughter of Rajendran. Aadi and Meenu loves each other from their childhood and both want to get married.Even though Mahendran wants to fulfill his son's wish Rajendran doesn't support the relation. He forcefully engages Meenu with Amal, Rajendran's nephew. Amal wants to marry Meenu for money and assets. Rajendran sends goons to attack Aadi but he is survived. He didn't told anyone that Rajendran is the master brain behind the attack. This made Rajendran felt sorry and forget all revenges towards the family and agreed Aadi to marry Meenu. This makes Amal provoke and he kills Aadi through an accident. This incident shockes both the families. Then Rajendran and Mahendran decided that Arjun, Mahendran's younger son will marry Meenu. Both gets married. But Amal didn't gave up. Then he tries to trap Akhila, Meenu's sister. He secretly captured some visuals when she changes her dress. He began blackmailing Akhila without revealing his identity. When the family learns about the issue, they immediately fixed marriage of Akhila with Amal without knowing that his trap. But Arjun found his plans and during marriage ceremony, he publicly caught him. In this time, family decided to get Goutham, Arjun's younger brother to marry Akhila and both got married.

== Cast ==
=== Lead ===
- Rahul Suresh as Arjun
- Krishnendhu Unnikrishnan as Meenakshi "Meenu"
- Diya Siby as Anjali
- Navaneeth Krishna PS as Goutham
- Della George as Akhila
- John Jacob as Aadhi

=== Recurring ===
- Anand Thrissur as Mahendran
- Thara Kalyan as Prabhavati
- Jayan as Rajendran
- Archana Menon as Mohini
- Shilpa Shiva as Kanchana
- Mahima as Mallika
- Omana Ouseph/Thrissur Elsy as Meenu's grand mother
- Malavika as Lachu
- Abhisree as Amal
- Dhanisha as Rakhee
- Diya Siby / Archana krishna as Anjali
- Nandana S Nair as Kanmani
- Raji Menon as Malini

Cameo appearance

- Kutty Akhil as competition anchor (Episode 1)

== Reception ==
The show was launched on 3 July 2023 at 10.00 PM IST. Then it got shifted to 6.30 PM IST It is one of the most popular show in Malayalam Television. On March 11 2024, the show was shifted to afternoon slot of 2.00 PM due to launch of Bigg Boss season 6. The pair of the show were known for their romantic performance and the show received huge praise.
