= Nandhan =

Indian drama film

- Theatrical release poster
- Directed by: Era. Saravanan
- Written by: Era. Saravanan
- Produced by: Era. Saravanan
- Starring: M. Sasikumar; Suruthi Periyasamy
- Cinematography: R. V. Saran
- Edited by: Nelson Anthony
- Music by: Ghibran Vaibodha
- Production company: Era Entertainment
- Distributed by: Trident Arts
- Release date: 20 September 2024
- Country: India
- Language: Tamil

Nandhan is a 2024 film Indian Tamil-language drama film written and directed by Era. Saravanan. The film stars M. Sasikumar and Suruthi Periyasamy in the lead roles.

Nandhan was theatrically released on 20 September 2024 to positive reviews.

== Plot ==
In Vanangankudi village, Koppulingam from the dominant community, has held the village board presidency consecutively for two terms. For the upcoming elections, they nominate him again but Nandan, a Scheduled Caste member asks for representation. However, he is chased out of the temple and later killed in a lorry accident. At Nandan's funeral, Koppulingam receives a phone call announcing the village panchayat's conversion to a reserved constituency, rendering him ineligible to contest. Concealing this fact, Koppulingam deceitfully announces his willingness to allow an SC candidate, exploiting the situation to maintain control.

Koozhpaana, a loyal domestic worker from the SC community, is manipulated by Koppulingam to contest and wins unopposed. However, Koppulingam undermines Koozhpaana's authority, sending him away from the panchayat office. The village men protest against Koozhpaana's name on the board, but Koppulingam intervenes, feigning support, when Koozhpaana's original name, Ambedkumar is revealed. During Independence Day celebrations, Koozhpaana is humiliated when Koppulingam hoists the flag instead of him. Further indignity follows when Koozhpaana's grandmother's corpse is denied entry by Koppulingam and his men into the burial site, forcing Koozhpaana to bury the body amidst the downpour.

Seeking justice, Koozhpaana meets the Block Development Officer (BDO) Marudhudurai, who allocates 10 cents of government land for a cremation ground which appears to be encroached by Koppulingam. When officials arrive to remove the encroachment, Koppulingam acts generously, allowing the clearance. But he later claims the village men's land as his own and demands Koozhpaana's resignation in exchange for letting the villagers stay. Koozhpaana complies, despite BDO Marudhudurai explaining reservation rules.

Koppulingam's men brutally beat Koozhpaana, and Selvi, vandalize their home, and vacate them for Koozhpaana's defiance. Marimuthu, Nandan's father, is coerced into contesting the election. However, Koozhpaana filed nomination papers, determined to challenge Koppulingam's dominance. Koppulingam terrorizes villagers, forcing Koozhpaana to withdraw his nomination. Unexpectedly, the BDO discovers Marimuthu's withdrawal letter, making Koozhpaana the unopposed president with the villager's support.

The movie concludes with Koozhpaana aka Ambedkumar making his first signature sitting in the village president's chair which was refused earlier.

== Cast ==
- M. Sasikumar as Ambedkumar aka Koozhpaana
- Suruthi Periyasamy as Selvi
- S. Mathesh as Ashwagandha
- Mithun Bose as Nandan
- Balaji Sakthivel as Koppulingam
- Katta Erumbu Stalin as Clerk
- Samuthirakani as BDO Sa. Marudhudurai
- V Gnanavelu as Maavattam
- G. M. Kumar as Periyayya
- Sithan Mohan as Thandapani
- Saravana Sakthi as Pothiyappa Rasu

== Production ==
The film was shot 35 days in Pudukottai district and Thanjavur. The film was produced by Era Saravanan under the banner of Era Entertainment. The cinematography was done by R. V. Saran while editing was handled by Nelson Anthony and music composed by Ghibran Vaibodha.

== Release ==
=== Theatrical ===
The film was released on 20 September 2024.

=== Home media ===
The satellite and streaming rights of the film were acquired by Vijay TV and Amazon Prime. Nandhan began streaming on Amazon Prime from 12 October 2024.

== Reception ==
Gopinath Rajendran of The Hindu wrote "Despite focusing on a pertinent issue that needs immediate attention and holding up a mirror to society on caste oppression and power dynamics, Sasikumar and Era Saravanan’s Nandhan suffers from shallow writing and amateurish making."

Avinash Ramachandran of The Indian Express stated that "Now, the last act of Nandhan is carefully placed to elicit a particular response. Unlike the previous 100-odd minutes, the last 10 minutes take up the documentary approach, and it leaves a strong impact, for sure."

Roopa Radhakrishnan of The Times of India rated two point five out of five and wrote that "All in all, Nandhan is a film with good intent made on a serious subject that has its moments, especially on the comedy front"
