= Kaathiruppor Pattiyal =

2018 Indian Tamil-language film

- Film poster
- Directed by: Balaiya D. Rajasekhar
- Written by: Balaiya D. Rajasekhar
- Produced by: Baija Tom
- Starring: Sachin Mani; Nandita Swetha
- Cinematography: M. Sukumar
- Edited by: Ruben
- Music by: Sean Roldan
- Production company: Lady Dream Cinemas
- Distributed by: Lotus Five Star
- Release date: 4 May 2018
- Running time: 113 minutes
- Country: India
- Language: Tamil

Kaathiruppor Pattiyal also known as Kathiruppor Pattiyal (transl. Waiting list) is a 2018 Indian Tamil language romantic comedy drama film written and directed by Balaiya D. Rajasekhar on his directorial debut and produced by Baija Tom under the production company Lady Dream Cinemas and distributed by Lotus Five Star while co-produced by K.V Jayaram. The film stars Sachin Mani in the male lead role and Nandita Swetha in the female lead role while Aruldoss, Manobala, Sendrayan, Mayilsamy, Arunraja Kamaraj, and Appukutty play pivotal and supportive roles in the film. Sean Roldan scored background music for the film. The movie was released on 4 May 2018 and received average reviews from critics upon the release.

== Plot ==
An RPF railway officer named Williams is miffed and frustrated because the public does not respect the RPF cops. He decides to enforce strict rules and asks his subordinates not to show mercy to defaulters who commit offences and people who mess up the railway rules. With the help of his team, he nabs many passengers who violate rules in various ways, including peeing on railway tracks and travelling on trains without tickets.

On the other hand, Sathya is a jobless man who falls in love with Megala, a girl from a rich family who has a job. Megala also falls in love with him, which was not tolerated by her father and suddenly arranges for a marriage to his daughter. When Sathya gets to know about this, he urgently prepares himself to travel by train from Tambaram to Puducherry to convince Megala from the arranged marriage and to marry her, but his dreams were spoiled by Williams, as he was arrested by cops on his way for committing an offence and was taken into custody at the Tambaram railway station. Soon after, he meets prisoners Baskar, Kunjitha Badham, Kutti Puli, Sathish, and Kodeeswaran and narrates his love story to them. After being impressed by the story, the prisoners hatch a plan to help Sathya to escape from police custody.

== Cast ==
- Sachin Mani as Sathya
- Nandita Swetha as Megala
- Aruldoss as Williams
- Manobala as Dr. Kunjitha Badham
- Arunraja Kamaraj as Kutti Puli
- Appukutty as Sathish
- Sendrayan as Baskar
- Mayilsamy as Kodeeswaran
- Chitra Lakshmanan as Megala's father
- Rajendran as Megala's father's assistant
- Muthukaalai
- Bava Lakshmanan
- Supergood Subramani

== Production ==
The filmmaker Balaiya D. Rajasekhar made his directorial debut through this venture and started its shooting process in 2017 and finished within a couple of months as a less budgeted film and was slated to an initial release on 2 March 2018 before its original release on 4 May 2018. The production team decided the film to be a simple and interesting premise set against an intriguing backdrop and the film was filmed and shot in Pondicherry.

The production team roped in Sachin Mani to play male lead role alongside Nandita Swetha in the female lead role. Aruldoss was chosen to play a serious role of a railway inspector in the most parts of the film despite being treated as a comedy drama film.

The team also hired well known editor Ruben for editing and roped in M. Sukumar as the cinematographer. The art direction was handled by Lalgudi N. Ilayaraja who previously worked as an art director for the Vijay starrer Kaththi.

== Soundtrack ==
The background music of the film is composed by Sean Roldan. The album was released on 13 November 2017 featuring four songs.

Kaathiruppor Pattiyal (Original Motion Picture Soundtrack)

Soundtrack album by Sean Roldan
- Released: 13 November 2017
- Genre: Feature film soundtrack
- Length: 13:01
- Label: TrendMusic
- Producer: Sean Roldan

Sean Roldan chronology
| Velaiilla Pattadhari 2 (2017) | Kaathiruppor Pattiyal (Original Motion Picture Soundtrack) (2017) | Mehandi Circus (2019) |

Soundtrack
| No. | Title | Lyrics | Singer(s) | Length |
|---|---|---|---|---|
| 1. | "Kathirukkum Koottathukku" | GKB | Hariharasudhan | 3:40 |
| 2. | "Azhagile Enai" | Yugabharathi | Pradeep Kumar | 3:09 |
| 3. | "Thee Thee Theeyena" | GKB | Adhithya Rao, Shakthisree Gopalan | 3:28 |
| 4. | "Call Mela Call Pootu" | Arunraja Kamaraj | Sean Roldan | 2:44 |
| Total length: | | | | 13:01 |
