= Beginning (2023 film) =

- Release poster
- Directed by: Jagan Vijaya
- Produced by: Vijaya Muthusamy; Jagan Vijaya
- Starring: Vinoth Kishan; Gouri Kishan; Rohini
- Cinematography: Veerakumar
- Edited by: C. S. Premkumar
- Music by: K. S. Sundaramurthy
- Production company: Lefty Manual Creations
- Distributed by: Thirrupathi Brothers
- Release date: 26 January 2023
- Running time: 111 mins
- Country: India
- Language: Tamil

Beginning is a 2023 Indian Tamil-language drama film directed by Jagan Vijaya and starring Vinoth Kishan, Gouri Kishan and Rohini in the lead roles. It was released on 26 January 2023.

== Cast ==
- Vinoth Kishan as Bala Subramaniam
- Gouri Kishan as Nithya
- Rohini as Bala Subramaniam's mother
- Lagubaran
- Sachin Mani
- Mahendran
- Uriyadi Suruli as Mahesh
- KPY Bala as Bruce Lee

== Production ==
Prior to release, the film was marketed as Asia's first split screen film. Jagan Vijaya made his directorial debut after fifteen years of experience in assisting other filmmakers.

== Reception ==
The film was released on 26 January 2023 across Tamil Nadu. Logesh Balachandran from The Times of India gave the film a middling review, noting "more than the content or its form, it's the lead actors who save the film". Navein Darshan from Cinema Express wrote "impeccable performances, technical brilliance let down by uninspiring writing", adding that "Beginning would have been an extremely inferior film in the hands of amateur leads. But Vinoth and Gauri deliver take care of the heavy lifting". A reviewer form Maalai Malar gave the film 3.25 out of 5 stars, praising the performance of the lead actors.
