= Chennaiyil Oru Naal =

2013 Indian film by Shaheed Kader

- Directed by: Shaheed Kader
- Screenplay by: Bobby–Sanjay; Ajayan Bala
- Story by: Bobby–Sanjay
- Based on: Traffic by Bobby-Sanjay
- Produced by: Radhika; Listin Stephen
- Starring: R. Sarathkumar; Cheran; Prasanna; Prakash Raj; Radhika Sarathkumar; Parvathy; Iniya; Sachin Mani; Aishwarya Devan; Gabriella Charlton
- Cinematography: Shehnad Jalal
- Edited by: Mahesh Narayanan
- Music by: Mejo Joseph
- Production companies: I Pictures; Magic Frames
- Release date: 29 March 2013
- Running time: 119 minutes
- Country: India
- Language: Tamil

Chennaiyil Oru Naal (transl. A day in Chennai) is a 2013 Indian Tamil-language thriller film written by brothers Bobby and Sanjay and directed by Shaheed Kader. The film has an ensemble cast including R. Sarathkumar, Cheran, Prasanna, Prakash Raj, Radhika Sarathkumar, Parvathy Thiruvothu, Iniya, Sachin Mani, Aishwarya Devan and Gabriella Charlton.

The film is a remake of the 2011 Malayalam thriller film Traffic. The film has its narrative in a hyperlink format. A multi-narrative thriller that intertwines multiple stories around one particular incident, the film is inspired from an actual event in Chennai. It was previously titled Naangu Vazhi Saalai.

The film opened on 29 March 2013 to positive reviews and was a blockbuster at the box office. A spiritual successor titled Chennaiyil Oru Naal 2 was released on 2017.

== Plot ==
On 16 September, superstar Gautham Krishna gets ready for the release of his new film. On the same day, Traffic Constable Satyamoorthy returns to duty after his suspension for taking bribes. The day is also special for Dr. Robin Joseph, a cardiologist who is celebrating his first wedding anniversary. Karthik Vishwanathan, an aspiring TV journalist, starts his first job with an interview with Gautham. On the same day, at a crowded traffic junction, Karthik, who was set to interview Gautham, and Ajmal, traveling on a bike, are hit by a speeding car and rushed to Global Hospital. Also at the junction, in another car, was Robin. Karthik goes into a coma and is declared brain dead, although he is kept alive on a ventilator.

Meanwhile, Gautham's ailing daughter Ria's heart condition worsens, and she urgently needs a heart transplant. At first, Karthik's parents do not agree to donate their son's heart, but Ajmal and Karthik's girlfriend Aditi persuade them. Now that the heart is available, the problem is how to transport it to Vellore. No chartered flights or helicopters were available, and so the heart must be taken by road. Someone had to drive 150 kilometers in under two hours during rush hour.

City Police Commissioner Sundarapandian IPS is asked to carry out the mission. He initially refuses, considering the complexity and risk involved, but finally succumbs to the persuasion of Dr. Arumainayagam. Satyamoorthy agrees to do the mission, as he had the experience of chauffeuring the Chief Minister's convoy, and he wants to regain his reputation from the bribe incident and starts the mission in a Ford Endeavour. Accompanying him on the mission are Robin and Ajmal. At some point, they lose connection, and the vehicle mysteriously disappears. Under pressure and stress, Satyamoorthy trusts his own instincts and takes his own route. Pandian loses patience and hope that he will be able to transport the heart in time, resulting in cancelling the mission. Just in time, Satyamoorthy manages to get connection, which motivates everyone to deliver the heart safely in time.

As the mission proceeds, it is discovered that before Robin committed to accompany Satyamoorthy on this mission, he had attempted to kill his wife Swetha due to her affair with his best friend. To escape from the police, Robin tries to sabotage the mission, but Gautham's wife convinces him to save her daughter's life. They reach the hospital in time to save Ria's life just as Karthik's father and mother prepare to cremate their son.

== Cast ==
- R. Sarathkumar as Sundarapandian IPS
- Cheran as Constable Satyamoorthy
- Prakash Raj as Gautham Krishna
- Prasanna as Dr. Robin Joseph
- Sachin Mani as Karthik Viswanathan
- Parvathy Thiruvothu as Aditi, Karthik's girlfriend
- Mithun as Ajmal, Karthik's friend
- Gabriella Charlton as Riya, Gautham's daughter
- Radhika Sarathkumar as Gautham's wife
- Jayaprakash as Viswanathan, Karthik's father
- Lakshmy Ramakrishnan as Karthik's mother
- Mallika as Satyamoorthy's wife
- Iniya as Swetha, Robin's wife
- Vijayakumar as Dr. Arumainagayam
- Devan as Dr. Senthil
- Kitty as Dr. Sethuraman
- Santhana Bharathi as Manimaran
- Subbu Panchu as Gautham's seceretary
- Manobala as Satyamoorthy's friend
- Bala Singh as Councillor
- Boys Rajan as Dr. Rajagopal
- Listin Stephen as Driver in last scene
- Suriya as Himself (special appearance)
- Sneha as Herself (special appearance)
- RJ Dheena as Suriya's fan (cameo appearance)

== Production ==
At the hundredth day celebrations of the 2011 Malayalam film Traffic, Kamal Haasan, who was the chief guest at the ceremony announced that he would remake the film into Tamil with Rajesh Pillai as the film's director. However, due to his extended involvement in his directorial venture, Haasan opted out of the film by November 2011 and R. Sarathkumar was subsequently chosen to replace him. The director postponed the film, mentioning that it would restart after the Hindi version was complete. Soon the actor's wife, Radhika, joined the film and agreed to produce the venture alongside Listin Stephen. Remya Nambeesan was signed on to reprise her role from the original. In March 2012, Rajesh Pillai left the remake citing scheduling issues and was replaced by his assistant Shaheed Khader.

The film was officially launched on 21 June 2012. She confirmed that Parvathy would make a comeback to Tamil cinema with her role in the venture.

== Release ==
The satellite rights of the film were sold to Sun TV.

== Soundtrack ==
Mejo Joseph who composed the original film had composed the songs thus marking his debut in Tamil.

=== Track listing ===
- "Kanavey" (Female) – Shweta Mohan
- "Un Tholil Saaya" – Srinivasan
- "Iravin" – Sithara
- "Kanavey" (Male) – Kaushik Menon
- "En En Yenum" – Tippu
- "Theme Music" – Sangeetha Sreekanth
- "Massetonia" – Srinivasan

== Critical reception ==
Behindwoods wrote:"On the whole, we have a movie which offers excitement and also educates us about a vital concept which can prove to be a life-changer to any of us in need".

Baradwaj Rangan of The Hindu wrote "The back-and-forth-in-time narrative structure helps camouflage the inconsistencies..what’s missing is the nerve-jangling tension that Hollywood routinely infuses into this kind of product, but the periodic cliffhangers keep us invested in the outcome. This is the sort of outing Tamil cinema could use more of."
