= RJ Dheena =

Indian radio and television show host

- Born: Dheena Dayalan; 22 May 1972 (age 54); Salem
- Occupations: Radio Jockey, Television host
- Years active: 2003–present
- Parents: R.Natarajan (father); C.Papathi (mother)

Dheena Dayalan, popularly known as RJ Dheena, தீனதயாளன் (தமிழ்) is an Indian radio jockey and television show host based in Chennai, Tamil Nadu. He is best known for his unique voice and Tamil slang, humour and rapid speaking rate. He has worked at Suryan FM 93.5 and BIG FM – Tamil, Chennai. He started his own studio/business Academy of Radio Studios & Salt Audios in 2011. Later Joined 8K Miles media) as a creative consultant United States in 2015 and 2018-19 headed a Tamil Radio station 89.4 Tamil FM in Dubai.

He set a new world record live on radio continuously for 168 hours and entered the Guinness Book of World Records, after breaking the existing world record of 135 hours set by Italian RJ Stefano Venneri. He also appeared as cameo in a Tamil movie Chennaiyil Oru Naal.
