= Gabriella Charlton =

Indian actress

- Born: Gabriella Natalie Charlton; 18 December 1999 (age 26)
- Other name: Gabi
- Education: Loyola College of Arts & Science
- Occupations: actress; dancer
- Years active: 2009–Present
- Known for: Jodi Number One; Bigg Boss Tamil; Eeramana Rojave 2; Marumagal

Gabriella Natalie Charlton (born 18 December 1999) is an Indian actress and television personality who works in Tamil-language television and film. She has appeared on the reality dance television series Jodi Junior and appeared on the seventh season of Jodi Number One, which she won. In 2020, she was a contestant on the fourth season of the reality series Bigg Boss Tamil.

== Career ==
Gabriella began her career in television at the age of nine, by appearing in Jodi Junior, a dance reality show broadcast on STAR Vijay. She also appeared as Gaby in 7aam Vaguppu C Pirivu, a Tamil soap opera about school children, that aired on STAR Vijay. She also appeared on the sixth season of Star Vijay's reality dance series Jodi Number One, which she won.

Gabriella Charlton appeared as Shruthi Haasan's sister in the romantic thriller film 3, and later as Prakash Raj's daughter in Chennaiyil Oru Naal. She also portrayed a significant role in Appa. She was a finalist in Bigg Boss Season 4. In Eeramana Rojaave 2, she played one of the leads. As of 2024, she is doing a lead role in the Sun TV series Marumagal.

== Filmography ==
Year	Film	Role(s)	Notes	Ref.
2012	3	Sumi	Debut Film; Child Artist	
2013	Chennaiyil Oru Naal	Riya	Child Artist	
2016	Appa	Rashitha Bhanu		
2025	Varunan	Sittu		

== Television ==
Year	Series/Shows	Role	Notes	Ref.
2009	Jodi Number One Junior	Contestant	Reality Dance Competition; Winner	
2012	7aam Vaguppu C Pirivu	Gaby	TV series	
2013-2014	Jodi Number One Season 6	Contestant	Reality Dance Competition; Winner	
2015	Genes Season 2	Participant		
2020-2021	Bigg Boss Tamil Season 4	Contestant	Walked, On Day 102 With Cash Prize 5 Lakhs	
2021	BB Jodigal Season 1	Contestant	Reality Dance Competition; Runner Up	
2021	Raja Rani 2	Herself	Guest appearance,TV series	
2022–2023	Eeramana Rojave 2	Kavya Parthiban	Lead, TV series	
2022	Oo Solriya Oo Oohm Solriya	Herself	Participant	
2024–present	Marumagal	Aadhirai Prabhu	Lead, TV series	
