= Nizhal (TV series) =

- நிழல்
- Genre: Soap opera
- Directed by: Syed Rafeeq Basha
- Starring: Sivan Srinivasan; Udhay; Sreevidhya; Sreedhar
- Country of origin: India
- Original language: Tamil
- No. of seasons: 1
- No. of episodes: 100+

Production
- Producer: Syed Rafeeq Basha
- Camera setup: Multi-camera
- Running time: approx. 20-22 minutes per episode

Original release
- Network: DD Podhigai
- Release: 15 April 2015

Nizhal (Tamil: நிழல்) is an Indian Tamil-language soap opera that airs on DD Podhigai. The show premiered on 15 April 2015 and it airs Monday through Thursday at 9:00PM IST.

== Cast ==
- Pavithra Janani as Pooja
- Sivan Srinivasan
- Udhay
- Sreevidhya
- Sreedhar
- M.B.Moorthy
- A.Revathy
- M.Revathy
- Sethu darwin
- Sabarishwaran
- Meenakshi
- Santhosh
- Bhushmini
- Biran yogesh
- Anu
- Jayaram
- Selva kumar
- Usha priya
- Ramesh
