= Vanjagar Ulagam =

2018 film

- Poster
- Directed by: Manoj Beedha
- Written by: Manoj Beedha; Vinayak
- Screenplay by: Manoj Beedha
- Produced by: Manjula Beedha; Prasanna JK
- Starring: Guru Somasundaram; Ciby Bhuvana Chandran; Vishagan Vanangamudi; Anisha Ambrose
- Cinematography: Rodrigo Del Rio Herrara; Saravanan Ramasamy
- Edited by: Anthony
- Music by: Sam C. S.
- Production company: Labyrinth Films
- Release date: 7 September 2018
- Running time: 122 minutes
- Country: India
- Language: Tamil

Vanjagar Ulagam (transl. World of crafty people) is a 2018 Indian Tamil-language crime thriller film directed by Manoj Beedha in his directorial debut with dialogues written by Beedha and Vinayak. The film stars Guru Somasundaram, Ciby Bhuvana Chandran, Vishagan Vanangamudi, and Anisha Ambrose, with Chandini Tamilarasan, Hareesh Peradi, John Vijay, and Azhagam Perumal in supporting roles. The music is composed by Sam C. S. while the cinematography is handled by Rodrigo Del Rio Herrara and Saravanan Ramasamy. The film was released in India on 7 September 2018.

The film is also set to be the first Tamil film to use both Carnatic music and dubstep for a song.

== Cast ==
- Guru Somasundaram as Sampath (Durai Raj)
- Ciby Bhuvana Chandran as Shanmugam alias Shaam
- Vishagan Vanangamudi as Vishagan
- Anisha Ambrose as Samyuktha
- Chandini Tamilarasan as Mythili
- Hareesh Peradi as Commissioner W. George
- John Vijay as Maaran
- Azhagam Perumal as Mahalingam
- Vasu Vikram as Police Inspector Neela Megam
- Jayaprakash Radhakrishnan as Bala
- A. Govindamoorthy as Police Constable Santhanam
- Manoj Mettur as Student Gang Leader
- Ravindar
- Ravi Venkatraman
- Raja Rani Pandian
- Preethi Kitchappan
- Praveen Raja
- Ramji

== Production ==
The project titled as Vanjagar Ulagam was commenced in early 2017 by director Manoj Beedha which was his maiden directorial venture and also previously served as a former assistant of S. P. Jananathan. Telugu actress Anisha Ambrose was signed up to play the female lead role and also marks her debut in Kollywood industry through this film.

The film was bankrolled under production studio Labyrinth Films by Manjula Beedha. A popular Mexican cinematographer Rodrigo Del Herrara was hired as the main cinematographer to make high quality action sequences, and Saravanan Ramasamy is also selected for additional cinematographer as well.

The film was also speculated to be the first Tamil film in Kollywood industry to combine both Carnatic and dubstep for an album song titled Kannanin Leelai. The official trailer of the film was released by popular film director Gautham Vasudev Menon on 15 February 2018. The film censored with clean "A" certificate from Tamil Film Producers Council.

== Soundtrack ==
The music is scored by Sam CS and album consists of 3 songs. The official single titled Kannadi Nenjan which was sung by Santhosh Narayanan and was released on 15 August 2018 as an independence day special for India by music composer GV Prakash Kumar.

Another popular music composer Yuvan Shankar Raja also collaborated with Sam CS and sung for the song titled Thee Yazhini.

Behindwoods given 2.25 stars out of 5 and Times of India gave 2.5 out of 5 stars.

Vanjagar Ulagam

Soundtrack album by Sam C. S.
- Released: 2018
- Genre: Feature film soundtrack
- Length: 10:03
- Label: Think Music
- Producer: Sam C. S.

Sam C. S. chronology
Lakshmi (2018)	Vanjagar Ulagam (2018)	NOTA (2018)

Soundtrack
No.	Title	Music	Singer(s)	Length
1.	"Kannanin Leelai"	Sam CS	Swagatha S Krishnan	3:33
2.	"Kannadi Nenjan"	Sam CS	Santhosh Narayanan	3:15
3.	"Thee Yazhini"	Sam CS	Yuvan Shankar Raja	3:15

== Release ==
The production of the movie was concluded in early 2018 and was slated to be released on 6 April 2018 but was later postponed to have its theatrical release in the month of August but delayed again due to the tight race at the box office. The film was released on 7 September 2018.
