= Suruthi Periyasamy =

Indian actress and model

- Born: Salem, Tamil Nadu, India
- Education: Bharath Institute of Higher Education and Research
- Occupations: Actress; Model
- Years active: 2021 – present

Suruthi Periyasamy is an Indian actress and model who works predominantly in Tamil language films. She made her debut in the reality television show Bigg Boss 5 appearing as an contestant. In 2022, she signed her first film alongside actor M. Sasikumar in the film Nandhan.

== Early life ==
Suruthi was born in Salem, Tamil Nadu, India. Suruthi completed her secondary school education at Holy Angel's school in Salem, she later attended Bharath Institute of Higher Education and Research university and graduated with a bachelor's degree in Industrial biotechnology. Worked in Nestle INDIA and started her career as freelance model. Her goddess Lakshmi portrayal in "DARK IS DIVINE" was recognized worldwide and made her a famous model.

== Career ==
Suruthi started her career as an pageant model appearing in various different model shoots around Chennai. In 2019, she auditioned for Femina Miss India 2019 and was later selected as the state finalist representing Tamil Nadu. The following year, she auditioned in Miss Diva 2020 as a model where she placed 18 put of 20 models.

In 2021, she made her television debut in the reality show Bigg Boss (Tamil season 5) which aired on Star Vijay and where she was seen participating as an contestant, however she later got evicted from the show on day 35. In 2022, she returned to the spin-off version of Bigg Boss titled as Bigg Boss Ultimate (season 1) and participating as an contestant once again. Later that year, Suruthi was offered her first debut film offer by director Era Saravanan to play the lead female role in his film Nandhan starring alongside actor M. Sasikumar. She later agreed to the film and was cast as the lead female. In 2023, Suruthi was offered a role to play a lesbian role in the film Vaazhvu Thodangumidam Neethanae which once again she was starred as the main character, she accepted the offer and is currently filming for the film.

== Filmography ==
=== Films ===
- All films are in Tamil unless otherwise noted
- Key
  †	Denotes films that have not yet been released

Year	Title	Role	Notes	Ref.
2023	Pizza 3: The Mummy	Ghostbuster		
2023	Demon	Jessy		
2023	Vaazhvu Thodangumidam Neethanae	Vinotha Parthasarathy	Released in OTT platform	
2024	Nandhan	Selvi	Debut as Lead actress	

=== Television ===
Year	Show	Role	Notes
2021	Bigg Boss Tamil Season 5	Contestant	Evicted Day 35
2022	Bigg Boss Ultimate (season 1)	Contestant	Won 15lakhs suitcase playing against another contestant and walked out on 62nd day

=== Music video ===
Year	Song	Notes
2022	Karuppu Vellai	
