= Ciby Bhuvana Chandran =

Tamil actor (born 1991)

- Born: Tenkasi, Tamil Nadu, India
- Occupation: Actor
- Years active: 2018–present
- Spouse: Shloka

Ciby Bhuvana Chandran (born 5 August) is an Indian actor who works predominantly in Tamil cinema. He made his lead debut as the protagonist in Vanjagar Ulagam (2018). He also participated in the reality show Bigg Boss Tamil Season 5 as a contestant.

== Early and personal life ==
Ciby was born in Tenkasi, Tamil Nadu and later moved to Salem, Tamil Nadu. After this, he moved to Chennai. His father is a doctor. While in college, he starred in short films. He married Shloka whom he met after returning from the United Kingdom on 14 November.

== Career ==
Ciby acted in the film O Kadhal Kanmani (2015), where he played a friend of Dulquer Salmaan in a minor role. His debut role was when he played one of the lead protagonists in the film Vanjagar Ulagam (2018). This earned him some fame, which led him to another breakthrough performance in the 2021 movie Master. He starred opposite Vijay, where he played a student of his, and also appeared in the song "Vaathi Coming". Ciby appeared as a henchman of the antagonist Vinay Rai in the 2022 film Etharkkum Thunindhavan.

Ciby participated in Season 5 of the Tamil reality television series Bigg Boss. He walked out of the show on Day 95 with a cash prize of 12 lakhs..

== Filmography ==
=== Film ===
Year	Film	Role	Notes
2015	O Kadhal Kanmani	Aditya's co-worker	Uncredited role
2018	Vanjagar Ulagam	Shanmugam / Shyam	Debut as a lead
2021	Master	Sri	
2022	Etharkkum Thunindhavan	Aaron	
2023	Thunivu	Ravi	
2024	Idi Minnal Kadhal	Haran	
2026	Oh Butterfly	Suriya	

=== Short films ===
Year	Short film	Role
2014	SPL Biryani	The Guy
2015	29 - Love Story	Varun Sharma

=== Music video ===
Year	Song	Label	Director	Music director
2014	Feel My Love	VRS MUSIC PRODUCTION		Vijay Raja Selvan
2015	Melody Of Love	VRS MUSIC PRODUCTION	Robert Runcie	Vijay Raja Selvan
2017	Heart to Heart	VRS MUSIC PRODUCTION	Robert Runcie	Vijay Raja Selvan

=== Television ===
Year	Title	Role	Channel	Notes	Ref.
2021-22	Bigg Boss Tamil Season 5	Contestant	Star Vijay	Walked Out on Day 95 with Cash Prize of' 12 Lakhs	
2022	Bigg Boss Season 5 Kondattam	Himself / Guest	Star Vijay	Celebration of Bigg Boss Season 5	
2022	Star Music Season 3	Himself / Participant	Star Vijay	Bigg Boss Season 5 Special	
