= Eeramana Rojave (TV series) =

Indian 2018 Tamil-language soap opera

- Season 1
- Genre: Family drama
- Written by: Nandan Sreedharan (S2)
- Directed by: Season 1 Francis Kathiravan; Rishi; Ravi Priyan Season 2 Thai Selvam; Raja Sundaram
- Starring: Season 1 Pavithra Janani; Dhiraviam Rajakumaran; Shyam; Sai Gayatri Bhuvanesh; Season 2 Dhiraviam Rajakumaran; Swathi Konde; Sidharth Kumaran; Gabriella Charlton
- Country of origin: India
- Original language: Tamil
- No. of episodes: Season 1; 807; Season 2; 502

Production
- Producers: Catherin Shoba (S1); Vaidehi Ramamoorthy (S2)
- Cinematography: Ramesh Durai
- Editor: SK.AbdulSuhel
- Camera setup: Multi-camera
- Running time: 22 minutes
- Production companies: Signature Productions (S1); A Tele Factory (S2)

Original release
- Network: Star Vijay
- Release: 9 July 2018 – 2 December 2023

Eeramana Rojave (transl. The Wet Rose) is a 2018–2023 Indian Tamil language romantic drama television series, aired on Star Vijay. The show is produced by Signature Productions and has two seasons.

The first season starring Pavithra Janani, Dhiraviam Rajkumaran, Shyam, Sai Gayatri Bhuvanesh, Praveen Devasagayam and Archana Kumar and directed by Francis Kathiravan, Rishi and Ravi Priyan. The show was aired from 9 July 2018 to 14 August 2021 for 807 episodes. The second season premiered on 17 January 2022 and ended on 2 December 2023 with 502 episodes, and aired on Monday to Saturday at night, starring Dhiraviam Rajakumaran, Swathi Konde, Sidharth Kumaaran and Gabriella Charlton.

== Series overview ==
Series	Episodes	Originally released	
Series	Episodes	First released	Last released
1	807	9 July 2018	14 August 2021
2	502	17 January 2022	2 December 2023

== Summary ==
=== Season 1 ===
Malarvizhi falls in love with Maran and they decide to marry. On the day of their wedding, Maran dies in an accident and his younger brother Vetri is forced to marry Malarvizhi. The story then revolves around Vetri and Malar's marriage life. After the marriage, Malar refuses to live with Vetri and scolds him for everything. Vetri's love interest, Anjali starts troubling Vetri for cheating on her. Malar and Vetri become friends after knowing that he hurt himself in order to stop the wedding night ritual for them. Once Malar wants to write an exam in Chennai. Vetri convinces his mother and take her to the exam venue where someone steals her bag in which she has kept the hall ticket. Vetri arranges for a new one saying that hall ticket was lost in 'Gaja' storm. A girl sitting near Malar copies and puts the blame on Malar. Vetri comes and rescues her on time.

Vetri's friend Idhayakani, uncle Thangarasu and grandfather make him believe that he loves Malar. Vetri accepts that after some . On a parallel story line, Azhagar, a relative from their maternal side troubles Malar's younger sister Akhila to marry him, but is always disrespected by her in return. One day, he takes a video of her changing clothes and blackmails her incognito. This threat leaves Akhila stranded in sorrow. Not knowing the true identity of the blackmailer, Akhila's father arranges her marriage with Azhagar, as he thinks he would accept her, despite the video, since he is his relative. Akhila seeks Vetri's help to find the blackmailer and on the day of her wedding with Azhagar, Vetri exposes the truth and Azhagar gets arrested. Vetri and his family convince Pugazh, Vetri's younger brother into marrying Akhila. Akhila and Pugazh have a troubled marital relationship since he is constantly triggered against her by his mother, sisters and Azhagar.

When Akhila and Pugazh goes to Akila's house to have a customary lunch (as there are newly married), to support them Vetri and Malar also accompany them. There, Vetri gives Kammapandi 25 lakhs to solve his money problems. Traditionial customs mean that the bride's family are to gift the newly married couple during this lunch. Since Akhila's father is unable to do so due to his money problems, Pughzh wears Vetri's jewels and goes back to their home but luckily their mother doesn't find out. Vetri becomes a farmer, whilst Malar gets a teaching job through the exam she had written, her in-laws forbid her to go to work. Meanwhile Pugazh remains unemployed. So through some insults and petty fights, Akhila somehow manages to send Pugazh to work than being home. Somehow through Anjali, Malar and Akhila's in-laws find out about Vetri helping the girls' family with money, a big problem occurs which leads to both of the sisters getting kicked out of the house and both of the families in great desperation. Vetri starts to miss Malar more, whereas Pugazh misses Akhila badly cause he has gotten used to their silly fights and bickering. Later, Akhila too starts to feel something for Pugazh but is not ready to name it. Pugazh finds his childhood friend Puppy's number, but does not realise it is Akhila herself. They text each other and Akhila writes like Puppy loves Pugazh, to understand whether his love for Akhila is genuine. Akhila asks her friend Geetha to act as Puppy. When Geetha accepts and meets Pugazh, he turns her down stating he loves Akhila. Pugazh and Akhila reunite and she also revealed that she is the real Puppy. The story is centred around the two pairs Malar-Vetri and Pughal-Akhila, added with another couple Azhagar-Thenu.

== Cast ==
=== Season 1 ===
==== Main ====
- Dhiraviam Rajakumaran as Vetrivel Naatarasan
- Pavithra Janani as Malarvizhi Vetrivel

==== Supporting ====
- Shyam as Pugazhendi
- Sai Gayathri Bhuvanesh as Akhilandeshwari Pugazhendi
- Kumaran Thangarajan as Maran (2018 - Dead)
- Praveen Devasagayam as Azhagar
- Sheela (2018-2019) and Archana Kumar (2019–2021) as Thenmozhi Azhagar a.k.a. Thenu:
- Kumaramoorthi as Idhayarkani
- Gemini Mani as Thangarasu
- Nisha as Eshwari Thangarasu (a.k.a. Eshu)
- Venkat (2018-2020) and Muthu Kumara Swamy (2021) as Naatarasan, father of Maran, Vetri and Pughazhendi
- Vijisha (2018), Yuvasree (2018–2020), and Deepa Nethran (2020–2021) as Anbukarasi Naatarasan, mother of Maran, Vetri and Pugazhendi
- Kammapandi (2018-2021) and Pondy Ravi (2021) as Rajadurai
- Premalatha as Indirani Rajadurai
- Ramya Joseph as Pavanu Idhayarkani
- Kumaran Thangarajan as Maran Naatarasan
- Poovai Suresh as Pusari
- Babitha as Santha
- Nivisha Kingkon (2018–2020) and Anu Sulash (2020–2021) as Anjali
- Shanthi as Thangam and Eshwari's mother
- Anju as Anjugam
- Bharathi Mohan as Ambalavaanan
- Madurai Mohan as Malaisamy
- S. N. Parvathy as Pappamaal
- Akshara as Selvi
- Pradeep Kumar as Maruthu
- Sathish as Pandi
- Chitra as Mayilu
- Rhema Ashok as Swetha
- Aravesh Kumar as Jeeva

=== Season 2 ===
==== Main ====
- Dhiraviam Rajakumaran as Jeeva - Arunachalam & Parvathy's son Parthiban & Arjun's brother Priya's husband Kavya's ex-boyfriend
- Sidharth Kumaran as Parthiban - Arunachalam & Parvathy's son Jeeva & Arjun's brother Kavya's husband
- Gabriella Charlton as Kavya - Durai Samy & Maha's daughter Priya & Shakthi's sister Parthiban's wife Jeeva's ex-girlfriend
- Swathi Konde as Priya - Durai Samy & Maha's daughter Kavya & Shakthi's sister Jeeva's wife

==== Supporting ====
- Chandni Prakash as Ramya
- Shravnitha as Sakthi
- Dasarathy as Arunachalam
- Meena Vemuri as Parvathy
- Manohar krishnan as Durai Samy
- Kiruba as Mahalakshmi
- Aarthi Ram as Devi
- Tharun Appasamy as Kavin
- Deepak Kumar/Naveen as Arjun
- Dinesh Gopalsamy as JK
- Rajeswari/ Bharani Elangovan as Manjula (Aishu and Anitha's mother)
- Sivan Srinivasan as Bhaskar (Meera’s father)
- Kanishka as Abhi (Aishu’s younger sister)
- Minnal Deepa as Valarmathi (Meera’s mother)
- Sunitha as Meera
- Thameem as Shankar, Aishu's ex lover

== Production ==
=== Casting ===
==== Season 1 ====
The series revolves around two families. Pavithra who was formerly in Saravanan Meenatchi (season 3) will be portraying female lead as a village girl while, Dhiraviam Rajakumaran plays the male lead and Kumaran Thangarajan plays the love interest of the female lead, Nivisha will be portraying love interest of the male lead but replaced by Anu Sulash.

Later Thangarasu was replaced by V. Muthukumarasamy. Kalyana Veedu and Bommalattam serials fame. Official teaser has been released by Star Vijay in YouTube on 1 July 2018. The supporting cast also includes Shyam, Nisha, Sai Gayatri Bhuvanesh and Venkat.

==== Season 2 ====
Actor Dhiraviam Rajakumaran, who acted in the first season, has also played the role of Jeeva in this second season. Newcomer Swathi Konde portrayed female lead roles as Priya, Sidharth Kumaaran was cast as Parthiban and Gabriella Charlton was cast as Kavya.

In September 2022, actor Dinesh Gopalsamy entered the show as GK. In April 2023, Deepak kumar opted out from the show and was to replaced by Naveen as Arjun. Actor Tharun Appasamy was cast in July 2023 as Dinesh.

== Adaptations ==
=== Season 1 ===
Language	Title	Original release	Channel	Last aired	Notes	Ref.
Telugu	Manasichi Choodu మనసిచ్చి చూడు	21 October 2019	Star Maa	4 June 2022	Remake	
Kannada	Jeeva Hoovagide ಜೀವ ಹೂವಾಗಿದೆ	3 February 2020	Star Suvarna	8 January 2022	Remake	
Hindi	Woh Toh Hai Albelaa वो तो है अलबेला	14 March 2022	Star Bharat	14 June 2023	Remake	
Malayalam	Kaathodu Kaathoram കാതോട് കാതോരം	3 July 2023	Asianet	13 September 2024	Remake	
Hindi	Deewaniyat दीवानियत	11 November 2024	StarPlus	29 January 2025	Remake	

=== Season 2 ===
Language	Title	Original release	Channel	Last aired	Notes	Ref
Malayalam	Anuraga Karikkin Vellam അനുരാഗ കരിക്കിൻ വെള്ളം	18 December 2023	Asianet	22 March 2024	Dubbed	
Marathi	Lagnanantar Hoilach Prem लग्नानंतर होईलच प्रेम	16 December 2024	Star Pravah	Ongoing	Remake	
