= Bigg Boss Agnipariksha season 1 =

Season of digital series (2025)

Bigg Boss Agnipariksha
- Season 1
- Presented by: Sreemukhi
- Judges: Abijeet; Bindu Madhavi; Navdeep
- No. of contestants: 15

Release
- Original network: JioHotstar
- Original release: 22 August – 5 September 2025

Series chronology
- Next → Season 2

Bigg Boss Agnipariksha 1, also known as Bigg Boss 9: Agnipariksha, is the first season of the digital pre-show Bigg Boss Agnipariksha. The pre-show involves selecting commoner contestants for the main show. The show aired exclusively on JioStar's streaming service platform JioHotstar. The show premiered on 22 August 2025 with former Bigg Boss contestants Sreemukhi as host and Abijeet, Bindu Madhavi, Navdeep as judges.

The show feature 15 selected commoners compete to earn their spot in the Bigg Boss Telugu 9 house. The winners entered the Bigg Boss 9 house as commoner contestants.

== Production ==
=== Announcement ===
On 28 June 2025, the makers of the show released a promo where Nagarjuna announced that commoners can participate in season 9. The auditions were done by bb9.jiostar.com website.

=== Teasers ===
On 31 July 2025, main host Nagarjuna announced that 45 commoners are initially selected to face a rigorous "Agnipariksha" to earn their spot in the Bigg Boss house.

On 13 August 2025, the makers of the show revealed the promo for its pre-show, Bigg Boss Agnipariksha with the tagline "The BIGG before the BIGGEST". The show sets the tone for a fiery battle, as hopefuls compete for a coveted entry ticket into the Bigg Boss house. The promo also introduced former Bigg Boss Telugu contestants Sreemukhi as host and Abijeet, Bindu Madhavi, Navdeep as judges of the show.

=== Broadcast ===
The pre-show will premiere from August 22, 2025, to September 5, 2025, and will be streamed exclusively on JioHotstar.

== Development ==
=== Digital Auditions ===
The initial call for applications was made on the bb9.jiostar.com website. Applicants had to register and upload a short video explaining why they deserve to be on the show.

=== Screening and Shortlisting ===
The makers shortlisted thousands of applications into smaller group of candidates based on their video submissions, personality, and screen presence in five levels.

- Level 1: Initial Screening, Out of lakhs of applications, around 200 candidates are selected based on their videos, personality, and screen presence.
- Level 2: Phone Interview, From those, 100 people receive a call for the next round.
- Level 3: Group Discussion Round, These 100 are filtered down to 40 candidates after a group task.
- Level 4: In-Person Interviews, Judges and even former contestants interview the 40, selecting the top 15.
- Level 5: Compete in tasks and the public votes to pick the commoners who will officially enter the house!

== Host and Judges ==
Former Bigg Boss contestants are participated in the show as host and judges.

- Abijeet: Actor, The winner of Bigg Boss Telugu 4, he is a part of the pre-show's judging panel.
- Bindu Madhavi: Actress, The first female winner of Bigg Boss Telugu in the Bigg Boss Non-Stop OTT season, she is a part of the pre-show's judging panel. With her determination, gameplay, and unwavering spirit. She is now returning to the show as a judge of the pre-show, challenging the participants in a fierce battle.
- Navdeep: Actor, second runner-up of Bigg Boss Telugu 1, he is well known for his playful personality and wittiness, earning him the "entertainer of the house" title. He is a part of the pre-show's judging panel.
- Sreemukhi: TV host, actress, runner-up of Bigg Boss Telugu 3, She is now part of pre-show's host responsibilities.

== Format ==
The makers shortlisted 45 commoner candidates to participate in the Agnipariksha pre-show. The mastermind judges will evaluate the participants based on their physical strength, mental agility, and humour. They will wield a green signal for approval and a red signal for rejection to select 15 contestants for the show. After selection process, the contestants compete in tasks, judged by former contestants Abijeet, Bindu Madhavi, and Navdeep. There will also be public voting for the selection. The selected candidates will join the main show along with celebrity contestants. This was also the first in Telugu reality show history to have a drag queen as a participant, where Patruni Sastry was featured.

== Season summary ==
=== Mega Audition (Episode 1 to 3) ===
The principal photography of the show began on 9 August 2025 in Annapurna Studios, Hyderabad.

- The contestants who receive three green signals from the judges will be directly selected for the Top 15.
- The contestants who receive three red signals from the judges will not be selected.
- The contestants who receive one or two green signals will be kept on hold for further rounds.

Episode no.	Episode date	Contestant	City	Judges			Result	Ref.
Episode no.	Episode date	Contestant	City	Abijeet	Bindu Madhavi	Navdeep	Result	Ref.
1	22 Aug 2025	Divya	Vijayawada				Selected	
1	22 Aug 2025	Harish	Vijayawada				On Hold	
1	22 Aug 2025	Khetamma	Nalgonda				On Hold	
1	22 Aug 2025	Priya	Kurnool				On Hold	
1	22 Aug 2025	Manmadha Raja	Miryalaguda				Not Selected	
1	22 Aug 2025	Abu Bakkar	Railway Koduru				On Hold	
1	22 Aug 2025	Madhuri	Visakhapatnam				Not Selected	
1	22 Aug 2025	Prasanna	Hyderabad				Selected	
2	23 Aug 2025	Pawan	Tanuku				Selected	
2	23 Aug 2025	Srija	Visakhapatnam				On Hold	
2	23 Aug 2025	Urmila	Hyderabad				On Hold	
2	23 Aug 2025	Patruni Sastry	Hyderabad				Not Selected	
2	23 Aug 2025	Narasaiah	Lakshmipuram				Not Selected	
2	23 Aug 2025	Naga	Vijayawada				On Hold	
2	23 Aug 2025	Shreya	Nellore				Selected	
2	23 Aug 2025	Ravi	Srikakulam				Not Selected	
2	23 Aug 2025	Sri Teja	Rajahmundry				On Hold	
2	23 Aug 2025	Manish	Hyderabad				On Hold	
2	23 Aug 2025	Kalki	Nalgonda				On Hold	
3	24 Aug 2025	Kalyan	Vizianagaram				On Hold	
3	24 Aug 2025	Alekya	Hyderabad				On Hold	
3	24 Aug 2025	Shakib	Shadnagar				On Hold	
3	24 Aug 2025	Dahlia	Kakinada				On Hold	
3	24 Aug 2025	Bejugam Venkatesh	Siddipet				Not Selected	
3	24 Aug 2025	Anusha	Sircilla				Selected	
3	24 Aug 2025	Sai Krishna	Anakapalli				On Hold	
3	24 Aug 2025	Nikita	Kadapa				On Hold	
3	24 Aug 2025	Janeeth	Vijayawada	—N/a	—N/a	—N/a	Not Selected	
3	24 Aug 2025	Shwetha	Hyderabad				Selected	

Male Contestants Female Contestants Trans Contestants

=== Do or Die (Episode 4 and 5) ===
The contestants placed "On Hold" competed in two levels to guarantee their spot in the Top 15.

Episode no.	Episode date	Level	Contestants			Selected
4	25 Aug 2025	Level 1	Harish	vs.	Sai Krishna	Harish
4	25 Aug 2025	Level 1	Urmila	vs.	Srija	Srija
4	25 Aug 2025	Level 1	Abu Bakkar	vs.	Kalyan	Kalyan
4	25 Aug 2025	Level 1	Dahlia	vs.	Priya	Priya
4	25 Aug 2025	Level 1	Shakib	vs.	Kalki	Kalki
5	26 Aug 2025	Level 2	Alekya vs. Khetamma vs. Manish vs. Naga vs. Nikita vs. Sri Teja			Manish; Dahlia; Naga; Shakib
5	26 Aug 2025	Level 2	Naga	vs.	Urmila	Manish; Dahlia; Naga; Shakib
5	26 Aug 2025	Level 2	Sri Teja	vs.	Naga	Manish; Dahlia; Naga; Shakib
5	26 Aug 2025	Level 2	Abu Bakkar vs. Alekya vs. Dahlia vs. Khetamma vs. Nikita vs. Sai Krishna vs. Shakib			Manish; Dahlia; Naga; Shakib

Abu Bakkar, Alekya, Khetamma, Nikita, Sai Krishna, Sri Teja and Urmila were eliminated.

=== Top 15 Agnipariksha (Episode 6–15) ===
The best performer of the task was granted a vote appeal, while the best player of the episode, chosen by the judges, received a star and a vote appeal. The judges also selected a worst player, from episode 8 worst player was given a yellow card; if a contestant receives two yellow cards, they are eliminated.

Voting lines for the Top 15 were opened, with the results scheduled to be revealed during the premiere of Bigg Boss 9.

Episode no.	Episode date	Chosen by team leader	Chosen by judges		Notes
Episode no.	Episode date	Best performer	Worst player(s)	Best player	Notes
6	27 Aug 2025	Kalyan	Kalki	Srija	In this episode, contestants competed in two teams.; Dahlia served as the task referee.; Team Leaders: Manish and Priya.
7	28 Aug 2025	Kalki	Manish	Kalyan	In this episode, contestants competed in two teams.; Team Leaders: Dahlia and Priya.; Manish and Shakib served as the task referees.
8	29 Aug 2025	Priya	Manish	Naga	In this episode, contestants competed in three teams.; Team Leaders: Manish, Naga and Shakib.
9	30 Aug 2025	none			Pavan, Manish and Shakib served as the task referees.; In this episode, contestants competed in three teams.; Team Leaders: Dahlia, Prasanna and Priya.; In this episode, the judges were disappointed with the task referees and chose not to name either a best or worst player.
10	31 Aug 2025	Harish	Dahlia	Priya	In this episode, contestants competed in five teams.; Team Leaders: Anusha, Kalki, Kalyan, Pavan, Shwetha.
11	1 Sep 2025	Dahlia	Shwetha	Shreya	In this episode, contestants competed in five teams.; Team Leaders: Harish, Shakib, Shreya, Shwetha and Srija.
12	2 Sep 2025	Prasanna	Prasanna; Shakib	Naga	In this episode, contestants competed as pairs.; Kalki was left-out and didn't compete in this episode.
13	3 Sep 2025	Divya	Shwetha; Prasanna	none	In this episode, contestants competed as pairs.; Shreya was left-out and didn't compete in this episode.; As the winning pair, Manish's yellow card was revoked.; Shwetha and Prasanna received the red card and were eliminated.
14–15	4 and 5 Sep 2025	none		Manish	In this episode, Top 13 contestants competed individually.

During the Grand Launch of Bigg Boss 9, Kalyan, Priya, and Pavan entered the house as public vote selections, while Harish, Srija and Manish were chosen by the jury – Bindhu Madhavi, Navdeep and Sreemukhi respectively.
