= Patruni Sastry =

Dancer, Performance Artist, Drag queen

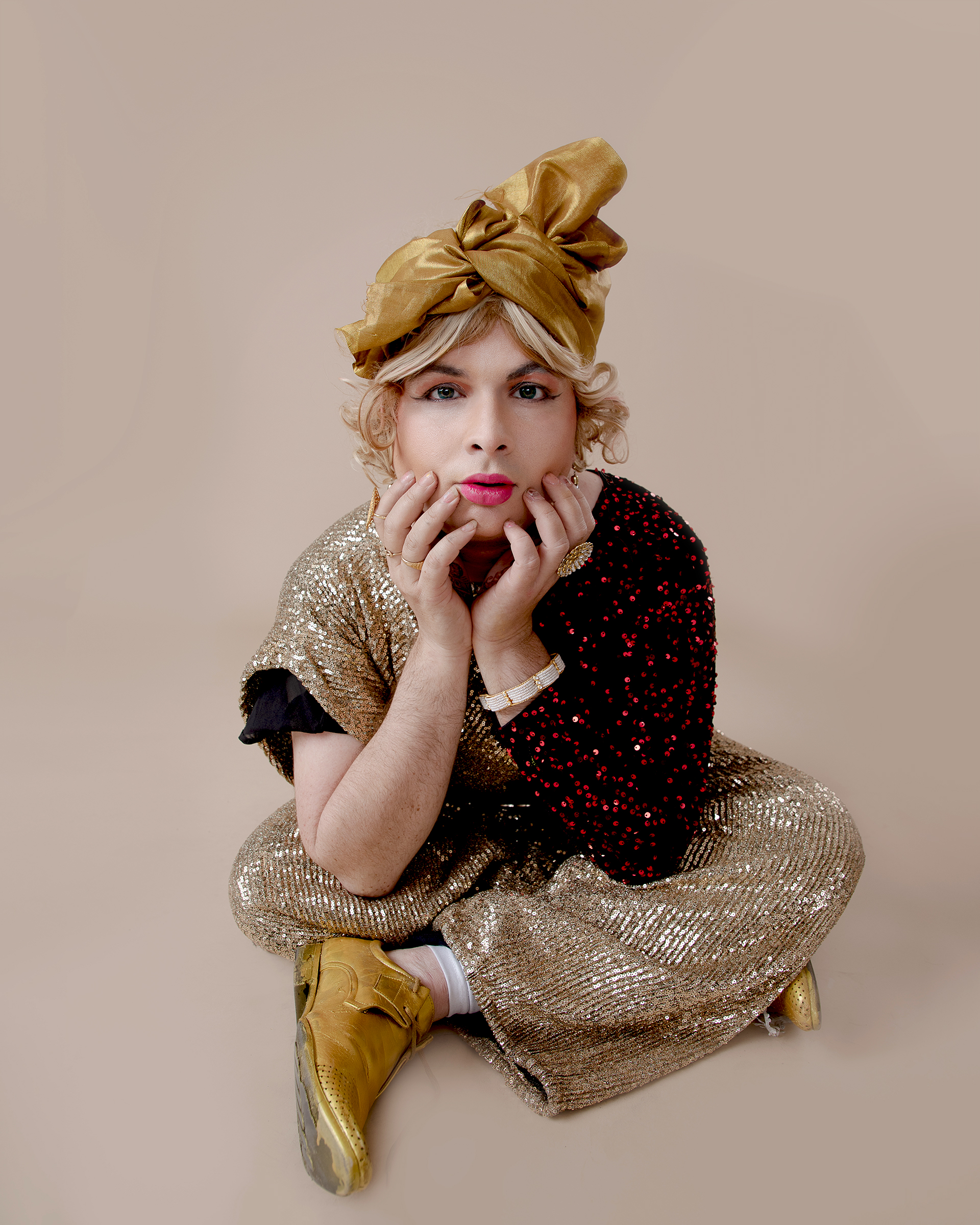
- Born: Patruni Chidananda Sastry; 25 December 1992 (age 33); Kharagpur, West Bengal, India
- Other name: Sas Who Ma
- Occupations: Dancer, Drag Artist, Performance Artist, Columnist, Model
- Organization: Dragvanti
- Known for: In Transit (Series)
- Style: Tranimal Drag
- Television: Bigg Boss Telugu Agnipariksha
- Spouse: Raja Rajeswari Devi
- Children: 1
- Honours: Voice of Pride, Bala Chitra Ratna
- Website: www.sas3dancingfeet.com

Patruni Sastry, popularly known as Patruni Chidananda Sastry or Sas Who Maa, previously known as Suffocated Art Specimen, is an Expressionist dancer, performance artist, visual artist, model, human rights activist,podcaster and Tranimal drag queen. Patruni is known for their role as a part of a documentary series directed by Ayesha Sood and Produced by Zoya Aktar and Reema Kagti production company tiger baby series "In Transit" on Prime Video. Patruni is also the first Telugu Drag queen to enter Bigg Boss Agnipariksha.

== Biography ==
Sastry started dancing at the age of 5. He was inspired by Ramya Krishnan from Padayappa in his initial days. Later from the Expressionist movement. He later learned Kuchipudi, Bharatanatyam, Odissi, Butoh, Contemporary dance. Sastry was inspired from Daniel Lismore, Austin Young and started performing Tranimal drag. Sastry performed at Hyderabad Literature festival, Namma Pride, The Lalit Ashok, Lamakaan. Shilparamam, and in many other public spaces. He founded Dragvanti and also acted in a short film 'Polar Night' which is based on the Polar Night effect by Rakesh Asileti. In 2021, Sastry was the convener for India's first Drag Conference. Sastry uses dance to talk about social topics such as sex education, queer activism, interfaith and religious acceptance and women empowerment. Patruni has also created two podcasts titled "Rangula Rattnam" which is the first ever telugu queer podcast and "Drag me to Heaven", a series on faith and Drag. Patruni has authored a book titled "Life is Drag, Sasit up". making them the first Indian drag queen to write an autobiography.

In 2024, Patruni Chidananda Sastry was featured in the Absolut Ally campaign, a national initiative by Absolut India spotlighting LGBTQIA+ voices and their contributions to visibility, inclusion, and advocacy. Sastry's presence in the campaign, alongside other queer changemakers, brought attention to their work at the intersections of drag, parenthood, and activism.

=== In Transit Documentary ===
In 2025, Sastry appeared in the Amazon Prime Video docuseries In Transit, directed by Ayesha Sood and produced by Zoya Akhtar and Reema Kagti under Tiger Baby Productions. The four-part series chronicled the lives of nine transgender and non-binary individuals across India, with Sastry's episode focusing on their experience as a drag performer and parent navigating gender identity, artistic expression, and familial roles.

=== Bigg Boss Agnipariksha ===
Patruni Sastry has also participated in Bigg Boss Agnipareshka Telugu Season 9 pre show as one of the 45 contestants shortlisted. Patruni became the first drag queen of Telugu native to be represented on a Telugu mainstream television show.

== Performance style ==
Patruni refers to his style of dance as "Indian Expressionism", inspired by Expressionist Dance and drawing upon Indian classical dance vocabulary. Patruni remarked about the origins of his style: "This woman is so raged that she got rejected, she screams out loud and dances. So for the very first time as a kid, when I saw this, I thought if you have to show your anger, you have to dance…And since then, I kind of picked [it] up. Whenever my mom was not giving me a chocolate or whenever I was not getting what I wanted, I used to scream aloud and dance, That was, how it became a kind of an expression.” Patruni also draws upon performance art in his work. His performances center on the body and how it relates to society, agency, and politics. Patruni explained his affinity with performance art as follows: "“I always [saw] my body as a kind of canvas,” Sastry says. “Literally using the body as a part of a movement—a movement is a canvas…When I pose a certain way or when I'm just posing in a different way—escalating my body into a certain form—it automatically creates a canvas. It automatically creates an art.”

Patruni's style of drag is an Indian-inspired variant of Tranimal Drag. Patruni explains the unique features of this style of drag: "But, unlike traditional drag, in which performers are praised for their elegance and beauty, I was attracted to tranimal style–also called 'drag terrorism'. Tranimal drag is the drag of poor, available drag queens. It does not throw money on clothes and cosmetics, and works on only one belief: 'this will do'. Tranimal drag performers make outfits themselves with available trash. They look vigorous, and they momentarily erase beauty and gender norms. When I perform tranimal I am liberated, I become the drag queen who doesn't wear heels, but performs bare-footed for the less privileged community that I try to remind myself of."

== Activism ==
In 2018, a Telugu YouTube channel created more than a couple of videos which were homophobic, transphobic and gender phobic, to which Patruni confronted with a petition to take the channel down. Patruni has also shared opinions of legalization of same sex marriages, gay locker room and the Snapchat new gender swap filter which seemed like a mockery of trans and gender nonbinary identities. In the same year Patruni also As a response to the Indian government stands on queer marriage rights Patruni said "I cannot believe that people who are involved in making polices are being this irrational about the basic gender rights of a human being. We expect our fellow citizens to stand with us in this as it's a threat to the existence of entire community". In 2020, Patruni also raised his voice against transphobic episode telecasted on a popular reality show Big Boss Telugu.

Patruni has voiced out for Indian bisexual and pansexual rights in multiple occasions. In 2021, Patruni welcomed the DC's Bisexual Superman initiatives with open heart by saying "The whole Superman thing made me feel empowered after a long time. He came out as a bisexual which is not so usual. People usually come out as gay or a trans person. When a protagonist like Superman reveals his sexual identity, it triggers a conversation about gender diversity and inclusion". In the same year Patruni has condemned a cover photo of Ayushmann Khurrana on GQ (Indian edition) which called itself to be representing the gender fluidity. calling the act a huge problem Patruni said "People need to understand that gender fluidity is not about costume play. Wearing a ghaghra or putting a nail paint from a cis-het privilege doesn't make someone gender fluid. Such things are quite insulting and disqualifying to the actual lives of people who are gender fluid. It leads to a lot of trauma and disqualification of a person's existence." Patruni also worked created multiple telugu language folk songs to educate people on LGBTQIA+ issues.

In the Same year Patruni Organized Hyderabad's first ever BI/PAN fest celebrating the most under-represented identities of the queer community.

In 2022, Patruni spoke about Ram Gopal Verma's Lesbian-based movie "Dangerous", he said “Even if it is released in PVR and multiplexes, who is benefiting-RGV or the community? Is it message-oriented like Badhai Do or Chandigarh Kare Aashiqui? In a media interaction, he wanted to discuss only lesbian and not gay-related issues. If he donates half of his earnings to the community, then yes we can support him". Patruni has also revolted for Gangubai Kathiawadi, speaking about the representation on Trans character by Vijay Raaz , In a Twitter post, Patruni said "Yet another shameless robbery of trans role. The only roles trans people get is to play are like this one and when some cis person plays a trans role, they take away the only opportunity"

Patruni hosted a podcast named Rangula Rattnam (transl. Colourful Carousel/Wheel of Colours) in 2022 that features members of the queer community discussing their lives and journeys in Telugu, making it possibly the first Telugu podcast to be hosted by a queer person.

In 2022, Patruni performed in drag in a public metro station in Hyderabad where a child joined them in dancing to Patruni's Song. A social media post shared by Yes we Exists gained more than a lakh views. As a part of the post, Patruni said "They ban kids from drag shows and say we are scary. But then, kids just shower love on drag queens,". In 2023. Patruni had been doing public drag performances for HIV Awareness for Telangana aids control department.

Patruni also introduced Drag tales a program similar to Drag Queen Story Hour in India where Patruni would read stories for kids in drag and break stereotypes of society. Patruni quoted 'So I take that opportunity to incorporate fun and humour in my shows, to talk about gender equality, inclusion and diversity.' when asked about the impact he is creating as a part of the story hour.

In 2024, Patruni became the first Indian drag queen to represent India in a US State sponsored International Visitor Leadership Program where Patruni traveled across 4 different states of America learning and performing drag for advocacy and context drag bans in the cities. Speaking about the experience Patruni said "Looking to the future, I see a bright and promising path for drag culture in India. In recent years, there has been a growing awareness and acceptance of drag, with more platforms and opportunities emerging for drag artists. I believe that drag has the potential to become a mainstream cultural phenomenon in India, much like it has in other parts of the world. As a pioneer in the Indian drag scene, I hope to play a significant role in its development and global recognition. By continuing to perform, mentor emerging artists, and advocate for LGBTQ+ rights, I aim to contribute to the growth and evolution of drag culture in India. My goal is to see Indian drag artists gain international recognition and to foster a vibrant, inclusive, and supportive drag community both within India and globally". Patruni also created a photo work as a part of blending drag with the city culture of Hyderabad by doing a walk at the Gudimalhapur flower market in full drag. In the same year Patruni spoke at the Rainbow Lit Festival in Delhi in a panel on titled "Queer Parents -Yes they exists" and did a performance titled 'Ghar' to agitate and question the closing down of Garima Ghar's by government of India in 2024.

In 2025, Patruni was a part of Interfaith Youth leadership program by Rubarro, where they created a social action plan on integrating faith and queerness together. Patruni created a podcast title "Drag me to Heaven" a series of conversation about faith and drag and documented 45+ drag artists from multiple faiths and regions of the world. this has been one of the only such documentations of faith and drag related conversation. Patruni also visited UK and connected with many faith leaders to foster interfaith dialogue to dismantle prejudice on faith and queerness. In the same year Patruni also presented a work titled "Come Sit with Me", a performance art piece as a part of Hyderabad Literary festival, as a retaliation to global politics surging trans inclusion and DE&I backtrolling by Trump. This performance was a three hour long bringing more than 200+ people participate in this interactive performance. In the same year Patruni curated Interfaith Pride Fest, an event held at Bagh Bean Café Hyderabad with interfaith panels, poetry readings, drag performances, and discussions about spiritual spaces for LGBTQIA+ communities.

Between 2025 and 2026, Patruni performed a series of works like Come Sit With Me, Show Me Visibility, and Bubble Wrap that explored how queer and gender-fluid bodies are perceived and navigated within public and social spaces. These pieces used bodily presence, silence, endurance, and public interaction to examine questions around visibility, surveillance, and social acceptance. Come Sit With Me, presented during the 2025 Hyderabad Literary Festival, placed Patruni in full drag within a corporate IT environment, inviting passers-by into conversations about identity and gender perception, with the audience gradually becoming part of the work itself. Show Me Visibility looked at the emotional labour of being seen as a queer person while still facing scrutiny, and Bubble Wrap reflected on how queer expression is managed or constrained through social and institutional pressures and was performed as a protest against the Trans Amendment Act 2026.

In the following years, Patruni Sastry used drag, performance, public speaking and media platforms to raise issues concerning gender identity, queer representation, education, public space and transgender rights. Patruni has described drag and performance as ways of creating conversations around gender, sexuality and belonging, while also participating in Pride discussions that frame Pride as both celebration and protest. They articulated publicly about the difficulties faced by performers in accessing public spaces, including the absence of clear busking regulations and the harassment and scrutiny experienced by trans performers while performing in public. Patruni participated in discussions on age-appropriate sex education, arguing that education should address gender and consent in addition to biological information. Their advocacy included commentary on political representation and the absence of LGBTQIA+ concerns from electoral policy discussions, as well as responses to developments involving queer political representation.

In 2026, Sastry became involved in public opposition to the proposed changes to India's transgender legislation, particularly provisions concerning self-identification and legal recognition. Sastry argued that gender identity should not require government inspection, medical proof or bureaucratic approval and described self-identification as a basic human right. Sastry also discussed the proposed legislation in relation to drag artists and gender expression, while participating in protests and public discussions concerning the bill. Following the passage of the legislation, Sastry called for consultation and strategic action within the community. Sastry has also commented on the effects of the new law on healthcare, employment, housing and corporate Pride programmes, including concerns that some companies were reducing transgender participation in Pride activities. In relation to political activism, Sastry has discussed the Cockroach Janta Party and its satirical approach to politics and later participated in artistic solidarity with CJP-related protest activity. Sastry has also continued to describe Pride as a space for discussions of identity, self-determination and representation, while using drag and performance as forms of public expression and advocacy.

== Personal life ==
In 2018, Patruni came out as a genderfluid person. In the same year Sastry identified himself as a pansexual. In one of the interviews he also said that he is in relationship with a cisgender woman and is planning to marry her soon. In 2021, Patruni redefined themselves as pomosexual person. and non-binary gender. On August 18, 2021, Patruni married Raja Rajeswari devi in Hindu rituals.

In 2022, Humans of Bombay, a social media platform covered a feature of Patruni and Rajeswari together which went viral on social media. In which Patruni said "My wife encourages me to be myself!". The video went viral with more than 2.5 million people viewership. In the same year, talking in an interview Patruni said "When I was looking to get married, there were so many people who said that I'd have to put aside my sexual identity. Others said it would mean I was cheating on my partner and many such ignorant things. Some even thought marriage would mean the end of my drag career. But, I'm grateful to have a wife like Rajeswari. She never questions anything I do. She gives me the warmth and love which I never got for ages".

In 2023, Patruni Sastry and their partner Rajeswari devi were part of an allyship campaign by Absolut India, where they both burst the myths of Bisexuality. Speaking about the experience for an interview Patruni said "Brands are usually picking up stories about trans people or people who are homosexual. Stories of other identities like non-binary people and bisexual people are not picked up. Time and again we see the same people and individuals involved in these brands. Sexuality or gender is all about perspective. I see transness in a far more different way than other people"

In 2023, Patruni and Rajeswari made officially announced that they are welcoming a baby into their life which would make Patruni 'India's first ever drag queen to have a biological kid'. In June 2023, Patruni announced that they had a baby, without revealing their gender, speaking in an interview Patruni said "I don't want some random parent to see my drag videos, show it to their kids and then that kid teases my child the next day, because of my profession. I have experienced trauma and I don't want it to pass on to my child. However, my wife reassured me that times have changed. Unlike when we were growing up, schools now engage in open seminars and conversations about these topics. It is up to us, as parents, to actively shape the progressive narrative." Patruni has also written an autobiography 'Life is drag, sas it up' making them the first ever Indian drag artist to write an autobiography.

== Music ==
=== Folk songs ===
- Pride Masam Anna
- Cheeranjiva Sukhibhava
- Chudu Sexy Gurl
- Rangula Rangamma
- Bisexual Ravanamma

=== Music videos ===
| Year | Title | Singer(s) | Ref. |
|---|---|---|---|
| 2022 | Kaun Bataye | Dastan Live | |
| 2022 | Sunshine on the Street | Peekay and Andrea Tariang | |

== Publications ==
- "Dressing as a Goddess: A Drag Photo book" (2020)
- "My Experiments with Drag"(2020)
- "Life is Drag, Sas it up" (2023)
- "Drag Sastry"(2026)

== Selected live performances ==
- 2014,2019: Queer And Allie Film and Art Festival
- 2017: International Story Telling Festival
- 2018, 2019: Hyderabad Literature Festival
- 2019: Out and Loud Film festival, Pune
- 2018:Menstrual Festival, Hyderabad
- 2018, 2019: Paryatan Parva, Hyderabad
- 2019: Ugadi Utsavalu, Hyderabad
- 2019,2020: Queer Carnival Hyderabad
- 2020, 2021: Queer Fiesta Hyderabad
- 2021: Hyderabad Dance Festival
- 2021: Samaanta by ICCR
- 2022:Mehefil e queer
- 2022:Satarangi Mela by Queer Nilayam
- 2023:Goa Pride festival
- 2023:Hyderabad Queer Dance Festival

== Performance art ==
- 2019: Four Play
- 2019: Strip Tease
- 2019: Patra
- 2019: Mati
- 2019:What's My Colour
- 2019: Nirod
- 2020:69
- 2025: Come sit with me
- 2025: Show me Visibility
- 2026:Burst My Bubble

== Film appearances ==
- Polar Night (as actor)
- Shoonyam (as director)
- 70/100 (as editor)
- The Glint : A documentary film Hyderabad drag club by students of Bhavans
- A Gathering by Poojita
- Makkan : A documentary film on Housing of trans people by students of Annapurna Studios
- Suffocated - a 60 sec documentary by Sujit Kumar
- Spilling Sas - A documentary by Prerna Toshnivala
- In Transit - A four part series by Ayesha Sood produced by Zoya Akhtar and Reema Kagti's Tiger Baby Productions on Amazon Prime Video.
