= Bigg Boss Agnipariksha season 2 =

Season of digital series (2026)

Bigg Boss Agnipariksha
- Season 2
- Presented by: Sreemukhi
- Judges: Abijeet; Bindu Madhavi; Navdeep
- No. of contestants: 15

Release
- Original network: JioHotstar; Star Maa
- Original release: 15 August – 5 September 2026

Series chronology
- ← Previous; Season 1

Bigg Boss Agnipariksha 2, also known as Bigg Boss 10: Agnipariksha, is the second season of the pre-show Bigg Boss Agnipariksha. The pre-show involves selecting commoner contestants for the main show. The show streamed on JioStar's streaming service platform JioHotstar and aired on Star Maa. The show premiered on 15 August 2026, with former Bigg Boss contestants Sreemukhi returned as host and Abijeet, Bindu Madhavi, Navdeep returned as judges.

The show feature 15 selected commoners compete to earn their spot in the Bigg Boss Telugu 10 house. The winners entered the Bigg Boss 10 house as commoner contestants.

== Development ==
=== Digital Auditions ===
The initial call for applications was made on a website. Applicants had to register and upload a short video explaining why they deserve to be on the show.

=== Screening and Shortlisting ===
The makers shortlisted thousands of applications into smaller group of candidates based on their video submissions, personality, and screen presence in five levels.

- Level 1: Initial Screening, Out of lakhs of applications, around 200 candidates are selected based on their videos, personality, and screen presence.
- Level 2: Phone Interview, From those, 150 people receive a call for the next round.
- Level 3: Group Discussion Round, These 150 are filtered down to 70 candidates after a group task.
- Level 4: In-Person Interviews, Judges and even former contestants interview the 70, selecting the top 15.
- Level 5: Compete in tasks and the public votes to pick the commoners who will officially enter the house!

== Format ==
The makers shortlisted 70 commoner candidates to participate in the Agnipariksha pre-show. The mastermind judges will evaluate the participants based on their physical strength, mental agility, and humour. They will wield a green fire signal for approval and a red fire signal for rejection to select 15 contestants for the show. After selection process, the contestants compete in tasks, judged by former contestants. There was public voting for the selection. The selected candidates will join the main show along with celebrity contestants.

== Season summary ==
=== Auditions (Episode 1–5) ===
- The contestants who receive three green signals from the judges will be directly selected for the Top 15.
- The contestants who receive three red signals from the judges will not be selected.
- The contestants who receive one or two green signals will be kept on hold for further rounds.

Episode no.	Episode date	Contestant	City	Judges			Result	Ref.
Episode no.	Episode date	Contestant	City	Abijeet	Bindu Madhavi	Navdeep	Result	Ref.
1	15 Aug 2026	Shalini Damera Patel	Karimnagar				On Hold	
1	15 Aug 2026	Abhi Sanger	Vizag				Not Selected	
1	15 Aug 2026	Singer Jhansi	Suryapet				On Hold	
1	15 Aug 2026	Uppal Balu	Hyderabad				Not Selected	
1	15 Aug 2026	Anjali	N/A				Not Selected	
1	15 Aug 2026	Arjun Arya	N/A				Not Selected	
1	15 Aug 2026	Srivani	N/A				Not Selected	
1	15 Aug 2026	Deborah	Hyderabad				Not Selected	
1	15 Aug 2026	Running Raja	Kurnool				Not Selected	
1	15 Aug 2026	Mithilesh Reddy	Madanapalle				Selected	
2	16 Aug 2026	Charan Mahadev	Nizamabad				Selected	
2	16 Aug 2026	Beebjan Shaik	Ongole				Not Selected	
2	16 Aug 2026	Vishishta	N/A				Not Selected	
2	16 Aug 2026	Rockstar Raj	N/A				Not Selected	
2	16 Aug 2026	Satya Rayaprolu	N/A				Not Selected	
2	16 Aug 2026	Nikhil	N/A				Not Selected	
2	16 Aug 2026	Bharath	Hyderabad				Not Selected	
2	16 Aug 2026	Aman Masud	Nalgonda				On Hold	
2	16 Aug 2026	Suma	Siddipet				On Hold	
2	16 Aug 2026	Akshay Raj	Balapur				Not Selected	
2	16 Aug 2026	Gayathri Vardhan	Hyderabad				On Hold	
2	16 Aug 2026	Pothuraj	N/A				Not Selected	
2	16 Aug 2026	Poojitha Jagadabhi	N/A				Not Selected	
2	16 Aug 2026	Sagarika Shetty	N/A				Not Selected	
2	16 Aug 2026	Charan Koushal	N/A				Not Selected	
2	16 Aug 2026	Sharmitha	N/A				Not Selected	
2	16 Aug 2026	Ruchitha Nihani	Warangal				On Hold	
3	17 Aug 2026	Shiva Srishti Vyakaranam	Vizag				On Hold	
3	17 Aug 2026	Ayyappa Sadhu	Bhimavaram				Not Selected	
3	17 Aug 2026	Aparna	Vizag				Not Selected	
3	17 Aug 2026	Ramakrishna Koyya	Srikakulam				On Hold	
3	17 Aug 2026	Raju	Siddipet				Not Selected	
3	17 Aug 2026	Anushree Katkam	N/A				Not Selected	
3	17 Aug 2026	Athanki Subbarayudu	N/A				Not Selected	
3	17 Aug 2026	Kavyasa Naidu	N/A				Not Selected	
3	17 Aug 2026	Bharath Ved	N/A				Not Selected	
3	17 Aug 2026	Rajakumari Dayana	Rajanagaram				Selected	
3	17 Aug 2026	Laya Jyothi	Hyderabad				On Hold	
3	17 Aug 2026	Samsav	N/A				Not Selected	
3	17 Aug 2026	Prathap	N/A				Not Selected	
3	17 Aug 2026	Vinitha	N/A				Not Selected	
3	17 Aug 2026	Lokesh	N/A				Not Selected	
3	17 Aug 2026	Pradeep Kumar	N/A				Not Selected	
3	17 Aug 2026	Venky Venkatesh Vibe	Bestavaripeta				On Hold	
4	18 Aug 2026	Lakshmi Deepak Senapathy	Vizag				On Hold	
4	18 Aug 2026	Aproova	Khammam				On Hold	
4	18 Aug 2026	Rohit Naidu Patnam	Vijayawada				On Hold	
4	18 Aug 2026	Goutham Raju	Eluru				On Hold	
4	18 Aug 2026	Ramya	Andhra Pradesh				On Hold	
4	18 Aug 2026	Aishwarya Ravindra	N/A				On Hold	
4	18 Aug 2026	Sriram Vasupalli	N/A				On Hold	
4	18 Aug 2026	Sri Sikkolu Seaman	N/A				On Hold	
4	18 Aug 2026	Sakshitha	Orugallu				On Hold	
4	18 Aug 2026	Gowri Trinetra	Konaseema				On Hold	
4	18 Aug 2026	Bhagi Tulluri Goud	Nellore				On Hold	
5	19 Aug 2026	Joshna Reddy	Kurnool				On Hold	
5	19 Aug 2026	Futa	Japan				On Hold	
5	19 Aug 2026	Abhigna	Hyderabad				On Hold	
5	19 Aug 2026	Sai Shaurya	N/A				Not Selected	
5	19 Aug 2026	Dhanlaxmi	N/A				Not Selected	
5	19 Aug 2026	Ruchita Mantri	N/A				Not Selected	
5	19 Aug 2026	Hari Prasanna	N/A				Not Selected	
5	19 Aug 2026	Sony	N/A				Not Selected	
5	19 Aug 2026	Nimmakaya Naveen	N/A				Not Selected	
5	19 Aug 2026	Hemanth Kumar Yadav	Hyderabad				On Hold	
5	19 Aug 2026	Shruthi	N/A				Not Selected	
5	19 Aug 2026	Lovely Chinna	N/A				Not Selected	
5	19 Aug 2026	Namitha Varma	N/A				Not Selected	
5	19 Aug 2026	Ramakrushna	N/A				Not Selected	
5	19 Aug 2026	Mary Rosey	N/A				Not Selected	
5	19 Aug 2026	Venkata Krishna	N/A				Not Selected	
5	19 Aug 2026	Bembadi Priyanka	Mancherial				On Hold	

Male Contestants Female Contestants Trans Contestants

==== On Hold Contestants ====
Out of the 26 contestants placed on hold, only 18 were selected by the jury to advance to the next round.

1. Aman Masud
2. Aproova
3. Bembadi Priyanka
4. Bhagi Tulluri Goud
5. Futa
6. Gayathri Vardhan
7. Hemanth Kumar Yadav
8. Joshna Reddy
9. Lakshmi Deepak Senapathy
10. Laya Jyothi
11. Ramakrishna Koyya
12. Rohit Naidu Patnam
13. Ruchitha Nihani
14. Shalini Damera Patel
15. Singer Jhansi
16. Shiva Srishti Vyakaranam
17. Suma
18. Venky Venkatesh Vibe

Sriram Vasupalli, Gowri Trinetra, Ramya, Goutham Raju, Aishwarya Ravindra, Abhigna, Sri Sikkolu Seaman and Sakshitha were eliminated.

=== Dare or Die (Episode 6–7) ===
The contestants placed "On Hold" competed in various dares to guarantee their spot in the Top 15.

Episode no.	Episode date	Dare No.	Contestants			Winner + Selected		Eliminated	Ref.
6	20 Aug 2026	1	Shalini	vs.	Aman	Shalini		none	
6	20 Aug 2026	2	Deepak vs. Gayathri vs. Rohit vs. Srishti			Srishti		none	
6	20 Aug 2026	3	Hemanth vs. Krishna vs. Venkatesh			Krishna		none	
6	20 Aug 2026	4	Bhagi vs. Jhansi vs. Joshna vs. Laya vs. Priyanka vs. Ruchitha vs. Suma			Bhagi		none	
6	20 Aug 2026	5	Hemanth	vs.	Venkatesh	none		Venkatesh	
7	21 Aug 2026	Fate	Aproova	vs.	Futa	none		Futa	
7	21 Aug 2026	Dare No.	Contestants			Winner(s)	Selected	Eliminated	
7	21 Aug 2026	6	Aman vs. Deepak vs. Laya vs. Suma			Deepak, Aman, Suma	Hemanth; Aman; Aproova; Deepak; Priyanka; Jhansi; Rohit; Gayathri	Joshna; Laya; Ruchitha; Suma	
7	21 Aug 2026	7	Hemanth	vs.	Rohit	Hemanth	Hemanth; Aman; Aproova; Deepak; Priyanka; Jhansi; Rohit; Gayathri	Joshna; Laya; Ruchitha; Suma	
7	21 Aug 2026	8	Jhansi	vs.	Priyanka	Jhansi	Hemanth; Aman; Aproova; Deepak; Priyanka; Jhansi; Rohit; Gayathri	Joshna; Laya; Ruchitha; Suma	
7	21 Aug 2026	9	Gayathri vs. Joshna vs. Rohit			Rohit, Joshna	Hemanth; Aman; Aproova; Deepak; Priyanka; Jhansi; Rohit; Gayathri	Joshna; Laya; Ruchitha; Suma	
7	21 Aug 2026	10	Aproova	vs.	Ruchitha	Aproova	Hemanth; Aman; Aproova; Deepak; Priyanka; Jhansi; Rohit; Gayathri	Joshna; Laya; Ruchitha; Suma	

==== Top 15 Contestants ====
1. Mithilesh Reddy
2. Charan Mahadev
3. Rajakumari Dayana
4. Shalini Damera Patel
5. Shiva Srishti Vyakaranam
6. Ramakrishna Koyya
7. Bhagi Tulluri Goud
8. Hemanth Kumar Yadav
9. Aman Masud
10. Aproova
11. Lakshmi Deepak Senapathy
12. Bembadi Priyanka
13. Singer Jhansi
14. Rohit Naidu Patnam
15. Gayathri Vardhan

Voting lines for the Top 15 were opened, with the results scheduled to be revealed during the premiere of Bigg Boss 10.

=== Top 15 Agnipariksha (Episode 8–22) ===
==== Fire Power Cards Twist ====
This season introduced Fire Power Cards, a game-changing twist that played a crucial role throughout the contestants' Agnipariksha journey, with this power they could change the game.

Episode no.	Episode date	No.	Power Card	Contenders	Power Winner	Used in	Power Used to	Ref.
8	22 Aug 2026	1	Reverse the decision	Rajakumari; Charan; Aproova	Rajakumari	Episode 10	She reversed the Team Leader's decision to give the Vote Appeal to Srishti and took the Vote Appeal for herself.	
8	22 Aug 2026	2	Skip the round	Hemanth; Gayathri; Deepak	Deepak	Episode 12	He used the Skip the Round Power Card to skip one of the Mental Strength challenges, earning 30 points for his team.	
8	22 Aug 2026	3	Blind Fire Card (Swap the Leader)	Aman; Mithilesh; Rohit	~~Aman~~ (Bindu Madhavi); Shalini	Episode 11	Bindu Madhavi transferred Aman's Power Card to Shalini, allowing her to swap one of the leaders. She swapped Priyanka with Jhansi.	
9	23 Aug 2026	4	Blind Fire Card (Immunity)	Ramakrishna; Srishti	Srishti (Navdeep)	Episode 15	She used this power to immune herself from Elimination.	
9	23 Aug 2026	5	Blind Fire Card (Steal the Half)	Bhagi; Priyanka	Bhagi (Sreemukhi)	Episode 13	She used this power to steal half of Aman's team's points, which were added to Rajakumari's team.	
9	23 Aug 2026	6	Head Start	Shalini; Jhansi	Jhansi	Episode 14	She used this power to gain a head start in the Teamwork Challenge.	
15	29 Aug 2026	7	Blind Fire Card (+1/-1)	Rohit; Shalini	Rohit (Abijeet)	Episode 17	He used this power to add Mithilesh to the team and bench Bhagi from competing in the Quick Thinking Challenge.	
15	29 Aug 2026	8	Bench a team	Bhagi; Deepak	Deepak	Episode 18	He used this power to bench Team Hemanth in the Speed Challenge.	
16	30 Aug 2026	9	Pair Maker	Rajakumari; Priyanka	Priyanka	Episode 19	She used this power to form pairs for Coordination Challenge.	
16	30 Aug 2026	10	Wild Fire Card (Replay)	-	The Jury (Abijeet, Bindu Madhavi, Navdeep); Shalini	Episode 21	Shalini won this card by winning the first Grand Finale Challenge. She used this power to replay one of the challenges.	

==== Contestants Statistics ====
The best performer of the task was granted a vote appeal, while the MVP (Most Valuable Player) of the episode chosen by the judges, received a star and a vote appeal. The judges also selected a worst player and was given a yellow card.

Episode no.	10		11		12		13		14		15-16		17		18		19		20		21-22	Launch
Episode date	24 Aug 2026		25 Aug 2026		26 Aug 2026		27 Aug 2026		28 Aug 2026		29-30 Aug 2026		31 Aug 2026		1 Sep 2026		2 Sep 2026		3 Sep 2026		4-5 Sep 2026	6 Sep 2026
Challenge	Strength		Endurance		Mental Strength		Real or Fake		Teamwork		Safety	Vote to eliminate	Quick Thinking		Speed		Coordination		Vote to save	Safety	Ticket to Bigg Boss (Note: The winner of series of challenges won the Ticket to Bigg Boss 10.)	-
Jhansi		SAFE	L	SAFE	L	BEST		SAFE		SAFE	SAFE	Gayathri		SAFE		SAFE	P4	SAFE	Aman	SAFE	Ticket to Bigg Boss	Selected
Aman		SAFE		SAFE		SAFE	L	SAFE		SAFE	SAFE	Gayathri		WORST	L	SAFE	P1	SAFE	UNSAFE	SAVED (Note: Aman received the majority votes to be saved from elimination from the other contestants.)	SAFE	Selected
Shalini		SAFE	L	MVP		SAFE		SAFE		SAFE	SAFE	Ramakrishna	L	SAFE		SAFE	P1	SAFE	Aman	SAFE	SAFE	Selected
Srishti		BEST + MVP		SAFE		WORST	L	SAFE		SAFE	IMMUNE (Note: Srishti used her Fire Power Card to immune herself from elimination.)	Ramakrishna		SAFE		SAFE	P2	SAFE	Aman	SAFE	SAFE	Selected
Charan		SAFE		SAFE		SAFE		SAFE	L	SAFE	SAFE	Ramakrishna		SAFE		BENCHED (Note: This contestant was benched by the holder of a Fire Power Card.)	P3	SAFE	Bhagi (Note: Aman chose Charan to receive a Yellow Card.)	SAVED (Note: Bhagi and Hemanth mutually chose Charan to be saved from elimination.)	SAFE	Selected
Rohit	L	WORST		SAFE		MVP		SAFE		MVP	SAVED (Note: Priyanka, Rohit and Apoorva won the safety task and saved themselves from elimination.)	Gayathri	L	SAFE		SAFE	P7	SAFE	Aman	SAFE	SAFE	Selected
Apoorva		SAFE		SAFE		SAFE		WORST		SAFE	SAVED	Gayathri		SAFE	L	BEST	P6	SAFE	Bhagi	SAFE	SAFE	Selected as Wildcard
Deepak	L	SAFE		SAFE		SAFE		SAFE		SAFE	SAFE	Gayathri		SAFE		SAFE	P6	SAFE	Ramakrishna	SAFE	SAFE	Not; Selected
Hemanth		SAFE		BEST	L	SAFE		SAFE		SAFE	SAFE	Gayathri	L	SAFE	L	BENCHED	P4	WORST	UNSAFE	SAVED (Note: Hemanth won the safety task and saved himself from elimination.)	SAFE	Not; Selected
Mithilesh		SAFE		SAFE		SAFE		SAFE		SAFE	SAFE	Gayathri		BEST		BENCHED	P5	SAFE	Aman	SAFE	SAFE	Selected as Wildcard
Priyanka		SAFE		SAFE	L	SAFE		SAFE		WORST	SAVED	Gayathri	L	SAFE		SAFE	P7	BEST	Bhagi	SAFE	SAFE	Not; Selected
Rajakumari		SAFE		SAFE		SAFE	L	MVP		SAFE	SAFE	Gayathri		SAFE		MVP	P5	MVP	Aman	SAFE	SAFE	Not; Selected
Ramakrishna		SAFE		WORST		SAFE		SAFE	L	BEST	UNSAFE	DANGER		MVP	L	SAFE	P2	(Note: Coordination Challenge winners - Priyanka & Rohit mutually chose Ramakrishna to receive a Yellow Card.)	UNSAFE	UNSAFE	SAFE	Selected as Wildcard
Bhagi		SAFE	INJURED (Note: During the leadership task, Bhagi had an elbow injury and was unable to participate in the team task.)			SAFE		BEST		SAFE	SAFE	Gayathri	~~L~~	BENCHED	L	WORST	P3	SAFE	UNSAFE	UNSAFE	Eliminated (Episode 20)	
Gayathri		(Note: The Red Team mutually chose Gayathri to receive the first Yellow Card, forcing her to sit out of this episode's task.)		SAFE		SAFE		SAFE	L	SAFE	UNSAFE	DANGER	Eliminated (Episode 16)									
Eliminated	No Elimination										Gayathri		No Elimination						Bhagi		No Elimination	Apoorva; Deepak; Hemanth; Mithilesh; Priyanka; Rajakumari; Ramakrishna
Ref.																						

Legend:

BEST indicates that the contestant chosen as best performer by the team leader
SAFE indicates that the contestant had a safe performance
MVP indicates that the contestant chosen as the most valuable player by the judges
WORST indicates that the contestant chosen as best player by the judges
DANGER indicates that the contestant was in the danger zone.
ELIM indicates that the contestant was eliminated

== Guest appearances ==
Episode	Guest(s)	Purpose of the visit	Ref.
Episode 8	Priya Shetty	To reveal a power card and conduct a task.	
Episode 8	Maryada Manish	To reveal a power card and conduct a task.	
Episode 8	Kalyan Padala	To reveal a power card and conduct a task.	
Episode 9	Demon Pavan	To reveal a power card and conduct a task.	
Episode 9	Divya Nikhita	To reveal a power card and conduct a task.	
Episode 9	Harita Harish	To reveal a power card and conduct a task.	
Episode 11	Sreenivas Kumar Naidu	To support the contestants.	
Episode 15	VJ Sunny	To reveal a power card and conduct a task.	
Episode 15	Thanuja Puttaswamy and Gnaneshwari Kandregula	To promote their new series "Part-Timers".	
Episode 15	Priyanka Singh	To reveal a power card and conduct a task.	
Episode 16	Yashmi Gowda	To reveal a power card and conduct a task.	
Episode 16	Amardeep Chowdary	To reveal a power card and conduct a task.	

== Controversy ==
During the audition process for Bigg Boss Agnipariksha Season 2, social media influencer Uppal Balu reached the final audition round before being eliminated. Following his elimination, Balu released a video alleging that he was humiliated by judge Navdeep, who criticized his content as vulgar and queried its value. Balu questioned the judging criteria, arguing that commoners and individuals from middle-class backgrounds should not be looked down upon or judged unfairly during auditions, a stance that drew significant support from his followers and fellow content creators.

Critics accuse Bigg Boss Telugu Agnipariksha of subjecting queer and gender-nonconforming individuals, such as social media creator Uppal Balu (Agnipariksha Season 2) and drag artist Patruni Chidananda Sastry (Agnipariksha Season 1) to interrogation over their gender identities and content, labeling them as "vulgar" or invalidating their advocacy. The producers invite viral, marginalized creators to boost ratings through sensationalism, only to reject them under the guise of "protecting social values". Following public backlash, host Navdeep defended the show's intense format as a high-pressure "horror film" environment designed to test candidates' emotional resilience against social media negativity. Media critics contrast the show with Bigg Boss Malayalam, where host Mohanlal explicitly shut down homophobic remarks from contestants to uphold inclusivity.
