= In Transit =

In Transit may refer to:

- In Transit (Saga album), released in 1982
- In Transit (Covenant album), released in 2007
- In Transit (2008 film), a film directed by Tom Roberts
- In Transit (2015 film), a documentary film directed by Albert Maysles, Lynn True, David Usui, Nelson Walker and Benjamin Wu
- In Transit (2025 film), an upcoming drama film
- In Transit (musical), a musical play by Kristen Anderson-Lopez
- In Transit (NY1), a cancelled news program on NY1 about public transportation issues in New York City
- In Transit (series) , an Indian documentary series
