= Bigg Boss (Telugu TV series) season 9 =

2025 television show season

Bigg Boss
- Season 9
- Season 9 eye logo
- Presented by: Nagarjuna
- No. of days: 105
- No. of housemates: 22
- Winner: Kalyan Padala
- Runner-up: Thanuja Puttaswamy

Release
- Original release: 7 September – 21 December 2025

Season chronology
- ← Previous; Season 8 Next → Season 10

Bigg Boss 9, also known as Bigg Boss 9: Ranarangam, is a reality show and the ninth season of the Indian Telugu-language reality television series Bigg Boss, produced by Banijay. Nagarjuna hosts the show for the seventh time in a row. The season premiered on 7 September 2025 on Star Maa and JioHotstar.

== Production ==
=== Teasers ===
The teaser featuring the show's host Nagarjuna was released on 29 June 2025 in which the showmakers revealed that commoners can send in applications for the first time to be a participant in the show.

=== Concept ===
The concept for the season is "Ranarangam" with two houses, one house for celebrities and other house for commoners.

=== 24x7 streaming ===
The show was streamed 24/7 on JioHotstar and an hour-long episode every day on Star Maa. The episodes were shown on a 24-hour live stream, from Monday to Friday.

== Housemates Status ==
#	Housemate	Day entered	Day exited	Status	Ref.
1	Kalyan	Day 1	Day 105	Winner	
2	Thanuja	Day 1	Day 105	1st Runner-up	
3	Pavan	Day 1	Day 105	2nd Runner-up, Walked	
4	Emmanuel	Day 1	Day 105	3rd Runner-up	
5	Sanjjana	Day 1	Day 19	Evicted By Housemates	
5	Sanjjana	Day 20	Day 105	4th Runner-up	
6	Bharani	Day 1	Day 42	Evicted	
6	Bharani	Day 50	Day 98	Evicted	
7	Suman	Day 1	Day 97	Evicted	
8	Rithu	Day 1	Day 91	Evicted	
9	Divya	Day 18	Day 84	Evicted	
10	Gaurav	Day 35	Day 70	Evicted	
11	Nikhil	Day 35	Day 69	Evicted	
12	Srinivas	Day 35	Day 63	Evicted	
13	Ramu	Day 1	Day 62	Walked	
14	Madhuri	Day 35	Day 56	Evicted	
15	Ramya	Day 35	Day 49	Evicted	
16	Aysha	Day 35	Day 47	Walked	
17	Srija	Day 1	Day 35	Evicted By Wildcards	
17	Srija	Day 50	Day 54	Evicted by Task	
18	Flora	Day 1	Day 35	Evicted	
19	Harish	Day 1	Day 28	Evicted	
20	Priya	Day 1	Day 21	Evicted	
21	Manish	Day 1	Day 14	Evicted	
22	Shrasti	Day 1	Day 7	Evicted	

== Housemates ==
The participants in the order of appearance and entered to the house are:

=== Original entrants ===
==== Celebrities ====
- Thanuja Puttaswamy – Actress. She is known for her appearances in television dramas Muddha Mandaram and Agnipariksha. She is one of the finalists in the cooking reality show Cooku with Jathiratnalu.
- Flora Saini – Actress. She is commonly known as Asha Saini and has worked in various Telugu and other films. Saini is popular for playing the role Asha in Nuvvu Naaku Nachav.
- Emmanuel – Actor and comedian. He is best known for his appearance in the comedy show Jabardasth.
- Shrasti Verma – Choreographer. She has choreographed various songs in blockbuster films such Jailer, Vikrant Rona, Game Changer, Rangasthalam, Pushpa, and Maaveeran.
- Rithu Chowdary – Actress and television presenter. She has appeared in television dramas Inti Guttu and Mounaraagam.
- Bharani Shankar – Actor. He is best known for the television drama Mahalakshmi. He has also appeared in films like Baahubali, Dheera, Crazy Uncles and Aaviri.
- Sanjjanaa Galrani – Actress. She is best known for her supporting role in the film Bujjigadu. She was a contestant on Bigg Boss Kannada 1, evicted on Day 14.
- Ramu Rathod – Singer and songwriter. He is known for folk songs "Bombai Ki Ranu" and "Sommasilli Pothunnave".
- Suman Setty – Actor and comedian. He is known for his comedic roles. His notable works include Jayam, 7/G Brindavan Colony, Avunanna Kaadanna and Ullasamga Utsahamga.

==== Commoners ====
All the commoners were selected through Bigg Boss Agnipariksha 1, a digital pre-show.

- Kalyan Padala- Army soldier
- Harita Harish – Entrepreneur. He is known as "Mask Man" as he wore a black face mask.
- Demon Pavan– Software employee/ Social media personality.
- Srija Dammu – Social media personality.
- Priya Shetty – Doctor and social media personality.
- Maryada Manish – Entrepreneur.

=== Wildcard entrants ===
==== Commoner ====
- Divya Nikhita– Social media personality. Entered the house on day 18 as a wild-card entrant.

==== Firestorms ====
Six housemates entered the house as Firestorm wildcard housemates.

- Ramya Moksha – Social media personality. Famous for her pickles business and online persona under Alekhya Chitti Pickles.
- Sreenivasa Sayee – Actor. He is best known for the supporting role in the film Golconda High School.
- Madhuri Duvvada – Social media personality.Runs a saree business known as vakula silks
- Nikhil Nair – Actor. He is known for the television drama Intinti Gruhalakshmi.
- Aysha Zeenath – Actress. She is best known for the television drama Savitramma Gari Abbayi. She was a contestant on Bigg Boss Tamil 6, evicted on Day 63.
- Gaurav Gupta – Actor. He is known for the television drama Geetha L.L.B.

== Guest appearances ==
Week	Day	Event	Guest(s)	Purpose of the visit	Ref.
Week 1	Day 0	Premiere	Bindu Madhavi, Navdeep and Sreemukhi	To reveal the commoner selected by the Jury	
Week 1	Day 7	–	Teja Sajja, Ritika Nayak and Vishwa Prasad	To promote their film Mirai	
Week 3	Day 21	Dasara; Special	Siddhu Jonnalagadda, Srinidhi Shetty, Harsha Chemudu, Raashii Khanna and Neeraja Kona	To promote their film Telusu Kada	
Week 3	Day 21	Dasara; Special	Harika Alekhya	Dance performance	
Week 3	Day 21	Dasara; Special	Shruthi Ranjani, Anirudh Suswaram, Dhanunjay Seepana and Sahithi Chaganti	Special performance	
Week 3	Day 21	Dasara; Special	Ritika Nayak	Dance performance	
Week 3	Day 21	Dasara; Special	Harsh Roshan and Sridevi Appalla	Dance performance and to promote their film Band Melam	
Week 3	Day 21	Dasara; Special	Kiran Abbavaram and Yukti Thareja	To promote their film K-Ramp	
Week 4	Day 33	–	Abhinav Manikanta and Payal Chengappa	To promote their TV series Rambo in Love	
Week 5	Day 35	Firestorm; Event	Sudeepa (Bigg Boss Kannada Host)	To reveal the Firestorm Special Powers to Wildcard housemates	
Week 5	Day 35	Firestorm; Event	Mohanlal (Bigg Boss Malayalam Host)	To reveal the Firestorm Special Powers to Wildcard housemates	
Week 5	Day 35	Firestorm; Event	Vijay Sethupathi (Bigg Boss Tamil Host)	To reveal the Firestorm Special Powers to Wildcard housemates	
Week 5	Day 35	Firestorm; Event	Pradeep Ranganathan, Mamitha Baiju and R. Sarathkumar	To promote their film Dude	
Week 6	Day 42	Diwali; Special	Shivani Nagaram	Dance performance	
Week 6	Day 42	Diwali; Special	Saketh Komanduri	Dedicating songs to housemates	
Week 6	Day 42	Diwali; Special	Sonakshi Sinha, Shilpa Shirodkar, Sudheer Babu and Shivin Narang	To promote their film Jatadhara	
Week 6	Day 42	Diwali; Special	Anandhi	Dance performance	
Week 6	Day 42	Diwali; Special	Hyper Aadi	Special commentary about housemates	
Week 6	Day 42	Diwali; Special	Apsara Rani	Dance performance	
Week 7	Day 46	–	Ambati Arjun and Amardeep Chowdary	As police inspectors in the Task to elect captain contenders	
Week 8	Day 50	–	Priya, Manish, Flora, Srija, Shrasti, Bharani	To participate in the weekly nomination process	
Week 8	Day 56	–	Rashmika Mandanna and Rahul Ravindran	To promote their film The Girlfriend	
Week 9	Day 62	–	Amala Akkineni and Ram Gopal Varma	To promote the re-release of their film Shiva	
Week 10	Day 70	–	Naga Chaitanya, Akhilesh and racers of Hyderabad Blackbirds	To promote their team Hyderabad Blackbirds in Indian Racing League	
Week 11	Day 72	Family; Week	Lasya (Suman's wife)	Family reunion week	
Week 11	Day 72	Family; Week	Shresta (Thanuja's niece), Pooja (Thanuja's sister)	Family reunion week	
Week 11	Day 72	Family; Week	Padma (Pavan's mother)	Family reunion week	
Week 11	Day 73	Family; Week	Azeez Pasha (Sanjjana's husband), Alarik and Ajina (Sanjjana's children)	Family reunion week	
Week 11	Day 73	Family; Week	Sri Laxmi (Divya's mother)	Family reunion week	
Week 11	Day 73	Family; Week	Laxmi (Kalyan's mother)	Family reunion week	
Week 11	Day 74	Family; Week	Rajini (Rithu's mother)	Family reunion week	
Week 11	Day 74	Family; Week	Aarti (Bharani's daughter)	Family reunion week	
Week 11	Day 74	Family; Week	Nanamma (Emmanuel's mother)	Family reunion week	
Week 11	Day 76	Family; Week	Vijay Laxmi (Bharani's mother), Nagendra Babu	To support Bharani.	
Week 11	Day 76	Family; Week	Laxman Rao Padala (Kalyan's father), Balu (Kalyan's brother)	To support Kalyan.	
Week 11	Day 76	Family; Week	Vamshi (Emmanuel's brother), Avinash	To support Emmanuel.	
Week 11	Day 76	Family; Week	Varanasi Rama Sharma (Divya's grandfather), Saloni (Divya's friend)	To support Divya.	
Week 11	Day 77	Family; Week	Gautham & Rupika (Suman's children), Srinivasa Reddy	To support Suman.	
Week 11	Day 77	Family; Week	Anita (Sanjjana's mother), Jamil (Sanjjana's nephew)	To support Sanjjana.	
Week 11	Day 77	Family; Week	Jathin (Rithu's brother), Akhil Sarthak	To support Rithu.	
Week 11	Day 77	Family; Week	Haritha, Pavan Sai	To support Thanuja.	
Week 11	Day 77	Family; Week	Durga Prasad (Pavan's father), Pavan (Pavan's friend)	To support Pavan.	
Week 12	Day 79	–	Priyanka Jain (season 7)	Former Best Captain housemates from past seasons. To challenge a housemate in the "Final Captain Contender" tasks.	
Week 12	Day 79	–	Gautham Krishna (season 7 & season 8)	Former Best Captain housemates from past seasons. To challenge a housemate in the "Final Captain Contender" tasks.	
Week 12	Day 80	–	Prerana Kambam (season 8)	Former Best Captain housemates from past seasons. To challenge a housemate in the "Final Captain Contender" tasks.	
Week 12	Day 80	–	Alekhya Harika (season 4)	Former Best Captain housemates from past seasons. To challenge a housemate in the "Final Captain Contender" tasks.	
Week 12	Day 80	–	Maanas (season 5)	Former Best Captain housemates from past seasons. To challenge a housemate in the "Final Captain Contender" tasks.	
Week 12	Day 80	–	Prince Yawar (season 7)	Former Best Captain housemates from past seasons. To challenge a housemate in the "Final Captain Contender" tasks.	
Week 12	Day 81	–	Shobha Shetty (season 7)	Former Best Captain housemates from past seasons. To challenge a housemate in the "Final Captain Contender" tasks.	
Week 12	Day 81	–	Syed Sohel (season 4)	Former Best Captain housemates from past seasons. To challenge a housemate in the "Final Captain Contender" tasks.	
Week 14	Day 97	–	Smita, Noel Sean and Vijay Binni	To promote their pop song "Masaka Masaka"	
Week 14	Day 98	–	Thaman S and Aniesh	To promote their film Itllu Arjuna	
Week 15	Day 104	Finale Week	Sivaji, Laya and Master Rohan Roy	To promote their film Sampradayini Suppini Suddapoosani	
Week 15	Day 104	Finale Week	Nidhhi Agerwal	To promote her film The RajaSaab	
Week 15	Day 104	Finale Week	Pradeep Machiraju and Sreemukhi	To promote their television show BB Jodi 2	
Week 15	Day 105	Grand Finale	Roshan Meka and Anaswara Rajan	To promote their film Champion	
Week 15	Day 105	Grand Finale	Mangli	Musical performance	
Week 15	Day 105	Grand Finale	Srikanth	To announce the 4th Runner-up	
Week 15	Day 105	Grand Finale	Sekhar, Sadha and Sridevi Vijaykumar	To promote their television show BB Jodi 2	
Week 15	Day 105	Grand Finale	Naveen Polishetty and Meenakshi Chaudhary	To promote their film Anaganaga Oka Raju and announce the 3rd Runner-up	
Week 15	Day 105	Grand Finale	Ravi Teja, (Note: Also to announce the 2nd Runner-up) Dimple Hayathi (Note: Also dance performance) and Ashika Ranganath	To promote their film Bhartha Mahasayulaku Wignyapthi	
Week 15	Day 105	Grand Finale	Payal Rajput	Dance performance	

== Nomination table ==
	Week 1		Week 2	Week 3				Week 4		Week 5		Week 6	Week 7	Week 8		Week 9	Week 10		Week 11	Week 12	Week 13	Week 14	Week 15	
	Day 1	Day 2	Week 2	Day 15	Day 18	Day 19	Day 20	Day 23	Day 27	Day 29	Day 35	Week 6	Week 7	Week 8		Week 9	Week 10		Week 11	Week 12	Week 13	Week 14	Grand Finale	
Nominees for House Captain	None		Emmanuel; Harish; Pavan; Sanjjana; Shrasti	Bharani; Emmanuel; Manish; Pavan		Bharani; Divya; Emmanuel; Suman; Thanuja		Harish; Pavan; Ramu; Rithu; Sanjjana	Emmanuel; Kalyan; Ramu; Rithu		Bharani; Divya; Emmanuel; Kalyan; Ramu; Thanuja		Aysha; Gaurav; Madhuri; Ramya; Sayee; Suman Gaurav	Divya; Emmanuel; Kalyan; Nikhil; Rithu; Thanuja		Bharani; Divya; Nikhil; Sayee; Thanuja	Bharani; Divya; Emmanuel; Rithu; Suman; Thanuja		Nikhil; Rithu; Thanuja	Rithu; Suman	Divya; Emmanuel; Kalyan; Pavan; Rithu; Sanjjana	None	None	
**House**; **Captain**	None		**Sanjjana**	**~~Pavan~~**; **Pavan**		**~~Emmanuel~~**		**Pavan**	**Ramu**		**Kalyan**		**Suman**	**Emmanuel**		**Divya**	**Emmanuel**		**Thanuja**	**Rithu**	**Kalyan**	**Bharani**	None	
**House**; **Captain**	None		**Sanjjana**	**~~Pavan~~**; **Pavan**		**~~Emmanuel~~**		**Pavan**	**Ramu**		**Kalyan**		**Gaurav**	**Emmanuel**		**Divya**	**Emmanuel**		**Thanuja**	**Rithu**	**Kalyan**	**Bharani**	None	
Captain's nomination	None		Suman (to evict)	Sanjjana; Suman; Flora; Rithu; Harish; Priya (to evict); Srija (to save)	N/A	Not eligible	Sanjjana (to save)	Not eligible	Flora	No; Nominations	Not eligible	Ramu (to evict)	Not eligible Aysha (to save)	Thanuja		**Sanjjana**; **Bharani**; Thanuja (to evict)	Bharani	Not eligible	Rithu (to save)	Kalyan; Sanjjana	Bharani (to evict)	No; Nominations	None	
Vote to:	Evict			Evict/Save	none	Evict	Evict/Save	Evict	Least Impact	none	Evict	Evict/Save	Evict					Evict/Save	Evict			none		
Kalyan	Sanjjana	Sanjjana	Bharani; Harish	Sanjjana; Suman; Flora; Rithu; Harish	N/A	Sanjjana	Not eligible	Not eligible	Flora	Nominated	House; Captain		Sanjjana	Ramu		**Ramu**	Nikhil	Emmanuel (to save)	Pavan	Suman; Pavan	House; Captain	Finalist	**Winner** (Day 105)	
Thanuja	Not eligible	Sanjjana	Harish; Flora	Sanjjana; Suman (to save); Kalyan; Priya; Ramu; Srija (to evict)	N/A	Red; Seed	Sanjjana (to save)	Srija	Flora	Nominated	Safe	~~Ramu~~; Suman	Ramya	Not eligible		~~Emmanuel~~	Gaurav	Emmanuel (to save)	House; Captain	Pavan; Divya	Pavan; Sanjjana	Nominated	**1st Runner-up** (Day 105)	
Pavan	Sanjjana	Not eligible	Flora; Bharani	House; Captain		Sanjjana	Not eligible	House; Captain	Flora	Nominated	Safe	Not eligible	Not eligible	Not eligible		Bharani; **Kalyan**; **Sayee**	Gaurav	Emmanuel (to save)	Kalyan; Rithu	Kalyan; Emmanuel	Thanuja; Sanjjana	Nominated	Walked with 15 Lakhs; **2nd Runner-up** (Day 105)	
Emmanuel	Not eligible	Nominated	Manish; Harish	Sanjjana; Suman (to save); Kalyan; Priya; Ramu; Srija (to evict)	N/A	Red; Seed	House; Captain	Not eligible	Harish	Saved	Safe	Not eligible	Not eligible	House; Captain		~~Thanuja~~; Sayee	House; Captain		Rithu; Bharani	Pavan; Thanuja	Rithu; Pavan	Nominated	**3rd Runner-up** (Day 105)	
Sanjjana	Not eligible	Nominated	House; Captain	Sanjjana; Suman (to save); Kalyan; Priya; Ramu; Srija (to evict)	N/A	Red; Seed	Evicted by Housemates (Day 19)	Flora; Divya	Harish	Nominated	Safe	~~Ramu~~; Bharani	Divya	Not eligible		**Suman**	Gaurav	Emmanuel (to save)	Kalyan	Bharani; Thanuja	Pavan; Rithu	Nominated	**4th Runner-up** (Day 105)	
Sanjjana	Not eligible	Nominated	House; Captain	Sanjjana; Suman (to save); Kalyan; Priya; Ramu; Srija (to evict)	N/A	Red; Seed	Secret Room (Days 19-20)	Flora; Divya	Harish	Nominated	Safe	~~Ramu~~; Bharani	Divya	Not eligible		**Suman**	Gaurav	Emmanuel (to save)	Kalyan	Bharani; Thanuja	Pavan; Rithu	Nominated	**4th Runner-up** (Day 105)	
Bharani	Not eligible	~~Sanjjana~~; Pavan	Priya; Pavan	Sanjjana; Suman (to save); Kalyan; Priya; Ramu; Srija (to evict)	N/A	Sanjjana	Sanjjana (to save)	Flora; Divya	Harish	Nominated	Safe	Not eligible	Evicted (Day 42)	Sanjjana (to evict); Nikhil (to nominate)	Selected	Not eligible	Divya	Emmanuel (to evict)	Emmanuel; Rithu	Thanuja; Divya	Sanjjana; Pavan	House; Captain	Evicted (Day 98)	
Suman	Not eligible	~~Sanjjana~~	Priya; Manish	Sanjjana; Suman (to save); Kalyan; Priya; Ramu; Srija (to evict)	N/A	Red; Seed	Sanjjana (to evict)	Rithu; Sanjjana; Harish	Harish	Nominated	Nominated	Thanuja; ~~Sanjjana~~	House; Captain	Sanjjana		Not eligible	Nikhil	Emmanuel (to save)	Kalyan	Sanjjana; Thanuja	Rithu; Pavan	Nominated	Evicted (Day 97)	
Rithu	Not eligible	Nominated	Harish; Flora	Sanjjana; Suman (to save); Kalyan; Priya; Ramu; Srija (to evict)	N/A	Red; Seed	Sanjjana (to save)	Srija	Flora	Nominated	Safe	~~Bharani~~; Divya	Aysha; Ramu	Not eligible		Ramu	Divya	Emmanuel (to save)	Sanjjana; Divya	House; Captain	Suman; Sanjjana	Evicted (Day 91)		
Divya	Not in House				Guest	Selected	Not eligible	Srija	Flora	Nominated	Safe	Not eligible	Aysha; Sayee	Not eligible		House; Captain	Gaurav	Emmanuel (to save)	Rithu	Bharani; Thanuja	Evicted (Day 84)			
Gaurav	Not in House										Suman	Ramu (to save); Bharani (to evict)	House; Captain	Not eligible		Not eligible	Sanjjana	Emmanuel (to save)	Evicted (Day 70)					
Nikhil	Not in House										Srija	Ramu (to save); Suman (to evict)	Not eligible	Thanuja		~~Thanuja~~	Rithu	Emmanuel (to save)	Evicted (Day 69)					
Sayee	Not in House										Suman	Not eligible	Kalyan	Not eligible		~~Thanuja~~	Evicted (Day 63)							
Ramu	Not eligible	Suman	Kalyan; Harish	Sanjjana; Suman (to save); Kalyan; Priya; Ramu; Srija (to evict)	N/A	Sanjjana	Not eligible	Rithu; Sanjjana; Harish	House; Captain		Safe	~~Rithu~~; Pavan	Not eligible	Gaurav		Kalyan	Walked (Day 62)							
Madhuri	Not in House										Srija	Bharani (to save); Divya (to evict)	Not eligible	Rithu		Evicted (Day 56)								
Ramya	Not in House										Srija	Rithu (to save); Pavan (to evict)	Thanuja	Evicted (Day 49)										
Aysha	Not in House										Srija	Sanjjana (to save); Thanuja (to evict)	**Rithu**	Walked (Day 47)										
Srija	Sanjjana	Thanuja	Bharani; Harish	Sanjjana; Suman; Flora; Rithu; Harish	N/A	Red; Seed	Sanjjana (to evict)	Flora; Divya	Flora	Nominated	Nominated	Evicted by Wildcards (Day 35)		Kalyan (to evict); Madhuri (to nominate)	Not Selected									
Flora	Not eligible	Nominated	Thanuja; Pavan	Sanjjana; Suman (to save); Kalyan; Priya; Ramu; Srija (to evict)	N/A	Immune	Not eligible	Rithu; Sanjjana; Harish	Black; Star	Nominated	Evicted (Day 35)			Rithu (to evict); Suman (to nominate)										
Harish	Sanjjana	Suman	Bharani; Emmanuel	Sanjjana; Suman; Flora; Rithu; Harish	N/A	Sanjjana	Not eligible	Not eligible	Black; Star	Evicted (Day 28)														
Priya	Sanjjana	Ramu	Flora; Bharani	Sanjjana; Suman; Flora; Rithu; Harish	N/A	Red; Seed	Not eligible	Evicted (Day 21)						Sanjjana (to evict); Kalyan (to nominate)										
Manish	Sanjjana	Not eligible	Bharani; Rithu	Evicted (Day 14)										Kalyan (to evict); Emmanuel (to nominate)										
Shrasti	Not eligible	Nominated	Evicted (Day 7)											Pavan (to evict); Ramu (to nominate)										
Potential Housemates
Anusha	Not in house				Guest	Not Selected (Day 18)																		
Naga	Not in house				Guest	Not Selected (Day 18)																		
Shakib	Not in house				Guest	Not Selected (Day 18)																		
Notes	1	2	3	4, 5, 6, 7	8	9	10, 11	11, 12, 13	14	14, 15, 16	17, 18	19	20, 21, 22, 23	24, 25, 26, 27		28, 29, 30	31, 32		33, 34	-	35	36, 37, 38		
Against public vote	Emmanuel; Flora; Pavan; Ramu; Rithu; Sanjjana; Shrasti; Suman; Thanuja		Bharani; Flora; Harish; Manish; Pavan; Priya; Suman	~~Flora~~; Harish; Kalyan; Priya; Ramu; Rithu; ~~Srija~~		Emmanuel; Priya; Rithu; Sanjjana; Srija; Suman; Thanuja	None	Divya; Flora; Harish; Rithu; Sanjjana; Srija	Flora; Harish	~~Bharani~~; ~~Divya~~; ~~Emmanuel~~; Flora; ~~Kalyan~~; Pavan; Rithu; Sanjjana; Srija; ~~Thanuja~~; Suman		Bharani; Divya; Pavan; Ramu; Suman; Thanuja	Divya; Kalyan; Ramu; Ramya; Rithu; Sanjjana; Sayee; Thanuja	Gaurav; Kalyan; Madhuri; Pavan; Ramu; Rithu; Sanjjana; Thanuja		Bharani; Kalyan; Ramu; Sanjjana; Sayee; Suman; Thanuja	Bharani; Divya; Gaurav; Kalyan; Nikhil; Pavan; Rithu; Sanjjana; Suman; ~~Thanuja~~		Bharani; Divya; Emmanuel; Kalyan; Pavan; Sanjjana	Bharani; Divya; Emmanuel; Kalyan; Pavan; Sanjjana; Suman; Thanuja	Bharani; Pavan; Rithu; Sanjjana; Suman; Thanuja	Bharani; Emmanuel; Pavan; Sanjjana; Suman; Thanuja	Emmanuel; Kalyan; Pavan; Sanjjana; Thanuja	
Re-entered	None						**Sanjjana**	None						**Bharani**		None								
Re-entered	None						**Sanjjana**	None						**~~Srija~~**		None								
Walked	None												**Aysha**	None		**Ramu**	None						**Pavan**	
Secret Room	None					**Sanjjana**	None	None																
Evicted	**Shrasti**		**Manish**	**Priya**		**Sanjjana**	None	**Harish**		**Flora**	**Srija**	**Bharani**	**Ramya**	**Madhuri**		**Sayee**	**Nikhil**		Eviction; Cancelled	**Divya**	**Rithu**	**Suman**	**Sanjjana**	**Emmanuel**
Evicted	**Shrasti**		**Manish**	**Priya**		**Sanjjana**	None	**Harish**		**Flora**	**Srija**	**Bharani**	**Ramya**	**Madhuri**		**Sayee**	**Gaurav**		Eviction; Cancelled	**Divya**	**Rithu**	**Bharani**	**Pavan**	**Thanuja**
Evicted	**Shrasti**		**Manish**	**Priya**		**Sanjjana**	None	**Harish**		**Flora**	**Srija**	**Bharani**	**Ramya**	**Madhuri**		**Sayee**	**Gaurav**		Eviction; Cancelled	**Divya**	**Rithu**	**Bharani**	**Kalyan**	

indicates that the Housemate was directly nominated for eviction.
indicates that the Housemate was immune prior to nominations.
indicates the contestant has been evicted.
indicates the contestant walked out due to emergency.
indicates the contestant has been ejected.
indicates the house captain.

=== Nomination notes ===
- **^1**: On Day 1, House owners had to mutually nominate one tenant.
- **^2**: In Week 1, two Tenants competed in a race to grab a hammer. The first housemate to grab it had to nominate one Tenant and then select an Owner to decide whether to accept or deny the nomination. The Tenant who lost the race was automatically nominated. At the end of the nominations, the Owners not chosen were in danger and Bharani as only tenant not nominated had the power to nominate one owner in danger for eviction.
- **^3**: In Week 2, Captain Sanjjana had the power to directly nominate one housemate for eviction. She chose Suman.
- **^4**: Due to an unfair decision by task umpire Rithu, Pavan's captaincy was revoked. A rematch task was held, in which Pavan once again emerged victorious.
- **^5**: In Week 3, the House tenants had to mutually nominate five housemates, ensuring that at least one nominee was a tenant. Then, the House owners had to mutually save two housemates from the nomination board and nominate four housemates.
- **^6**: Captain Pavan had the power to save one nominated housemate from eviction. He chose Srija.
- **^7**: On Day 17, Flora won the Immunity task and secured her safety from that week's eviction.
- **^8**: On Day 18, four contestants from Bigg Boss Agnipariksha - Anusha, Divya, Naga and Shakib entered the Bigg Boss House as Potential Housemates. The housemates had to secretly vote for two contestants to enter. However, in a twist by Bigg Boss, despite receiving the least votes, Divya was granted entry as a housemate.
- **^9**: On Day 19, Bigg Boss introduced Red Seed twist, tasking the housemates with voting to evict one housemate holding it. Sanjjana was selected for eviction by the safe housemates but was instead moved to the Secret Room.
- **^10**: On Day 20, housemates were asked to make personal sacrifices to bring Sanjjana back. Four of the six accepted, leading to Sanjjana's return to the main house.
- **^11**: As Emmanuel sacrificed his Captaincy for Sanjjana's return. On Day 21, a Captaincy Task was held among five new contenders, where Pavan emerged victorious and became the new Captain.
- **^12**: On Day 22, housemates competed to win the Immunity badge. Suman and Thanuja won and secured their safety from that week's eviction.
- **^13**: In Week 4, the nomination process was conducted through a task, where housemates competed in four teams for the opportunity to nominate.
  - Team Red - Kalyan (C), Emmanuel and Harish
  - Team Yellow - Suman (C), Flora and Ramu
  - Team Blue - Thanuja (C), Divya and Rithu
  - Team Green - Bharani (C), Sanjjana and Srija
- **^14**: On Day 27, Host Nagarjuna introduced Black Star twist, tasking the housemates with voting for one housemates who has least impact in the house. Flora received the most votes and was directly nominated for next two weeks.
- **^15**: In Week 5, Bigg Boss nominated all housemates, except for Captain Ramu. Nominated housemates were given opportunity to win Immunity. Emmanuel won the Immunity task and secured his safety from that week's eviction.
- **^16**: Nominated housemates were given opportunity to win safety in series of tasks. On Day 32, Bharani, Divya and Kalyan won the task and were saved from that week's eviction. On Day 33, Thanuja won the task and was also saved.
- **^17**: On Day 35, Nominated housemates were given one more opportunity to win safety in series of tasks. Pavan, Rithu and Sanjjana won the tasks and were saved from that week's eviction. Srija and Suman remained in Danger Zone.
- **^18**: On Day 35, FireStorm Wild-card housemates had to evict one housemate in Danger Zone.
- **^19**: In Week 6, the wild-card contestants competed in a race to grab a ball. The first housemate to grab it had to give it to a housemate of their choice, granting them the power to nominate two housemates. The wild-card contestant then had to save one of the two nominated housemates.
- **^20**: On Day 39, Bigg Boss announced that there would be two House Captains for Week 7. Gaurav and Suman won the captaincy task.
- **^21**: Nikhil had the Firestorm Power to challenge one of the House Captains — if he won, he would take their place as House Captain. He challenged Gaurav but lost.
- **^22**: In Week 7, Suman and Gaurav had to choose between two pills. Gaurav chose the Blue Pill, which gave him the power to save one housemate, but also made him eligible to be nominated by others. Suman chose the Red Pill, granting him immunity from nominations for the week.
- **^23**: As, Aysha, who had the Power of Nominations, and Emmanuel, who had the Power Astra, competed in a task to earn nomination cards. Aysha received two cards to nominate one housemate each and one card for a direct nomination. Emmanuel received two cards to nominate two housemates each and three cards to nominate one housemate each. Both had the distribute these cards to housemates of their choice.
- **^24**: Madhuri was directly nominated as punishment during weekend Task.
- **^25**: Sayee used the Firestorm Power to keep himself immune from this week's nominations.
- **^26**: In Week 8 nominations, evicted housemates returned to nominate one housemate and select one housemate to get the chance to nominate.
- **^27**: On Day 50, Bharani and Srija re-entered the house as temporary housemates, but only one of them would become an official housemate. After series of tasks, on day 54, Bharani became an official housemate and Srija was evicted.
- **^28**: In this week's nominations, housemates raced to grab a teddy tagged with another housemate's picture and reach the safe zone.
  - In Round 1 & 2: The last housemate, along with the housemate whose teddy remained, had to put points against each other to nominate. Bigg Boss then chose a decider housemate to nominate one of the two.
  - In Round 3–6: The last housemate, along with the housemate whose teddy remained, each had to nominate any one housemate. Then the decider housemate chose to nominate one of the two nominated housemates. (The nominations in **Bold** are the deciders nominations)
- **^29**: In Week 9, after nominations process Captain Divya had the power to directly nominate one housemate for eviction. She chose Thanuja.
- **^30**: On Day 62, Ramu decided to voluntary exit.
- **^31**: In Week 10, despite housemates being asked to nominate one housemate each, Bigg Boss directly nominated everyone. Housemates then had to decide if Captain Emmanuel should stay safe or also be nominated.
- **^32**: On Day 67, Thanuja won the Captaincy task and was saved from that week's eviction.
- **^33**: In Week 11, Captain Thanuja had to assign the number of nominations each housemate would receive, giving 2 nominations to four housemates and 1 nomination to the remaining four. She also had the power to save one nominated housemate. She chose Rithu.
- **^34**: On Day 77, Emmanuel used the Power Astra to cancel this week's eviction. Therefore, Divya was saved from eviction.
- **^35**: In Week 13, Captain Kalyan had the power to directly nominate one housemate for eviction. He chose Bharani.
- **^36**: Kalyan won the 1st Finalist Task and become the 1st Finalist of the season and was immune from Eviction.
- **^37**: In Week 14, Bigg Boss nominated all housemates, except for 1st Finalist Kalyan. Nominated housemates were given opportunity to take part in series of tasks to win Immunity. _ won the Immunity task and secured his/her safety from that week's eviction.
- **^38**: Since Bharani was the only housemate who had never been a Captain, Bigg Boss selected him as the last Captain; however, he did not receive immunity

== Related shows ==
=== Bigg Boss Agnipariksha ===
Bigg Boss Agnipariksha 1 is a digital pre-show of Bigg Boss 9. It will feature 40 selected commoners compete to earn their spot in the Bigg Boss Telugu 9 house. This show is scheduled to premiere on 22 August 2025. This pre-show featured fifteen shortlisted commoners compete in tasks, judged by former contestants Abijeet, Bindu Madhavi, and Navdeep, with host Sreemukhi. Winners will earn a place alongside celebrities in the main Bigg Boss house.

During the grand launch, Kalyan, Priya, and Pavan entered the house as public vote selections, while Harish, Manish, and Srija were chosen by the jury. Later on day 18, Divya entered into the house as wildcard receiving least votes from the housemates out of Naga Prashanth, Shakib and Anusha.

=== Bigg Boss 9 Buzzz ===
Bigg Boss 9 Buzzz is an Indian Telugu-language television talk show in which the Sivaji, a contestant of Bigg Boss 7, interviews the eliminated contestants. The show premiered on 14 September 2025 on Star Maa Music and unaired portions of episodes are streamed on JioHotstar and aired on Star Maa.
