= Tranimal =

Drag and performance art movement

Tranimal is a drag and performance art movement that began in the mid 2000s in Los Angeles. Deriving from the word "transvestite", the aim was to create interpretive, animalistic and post-modern interpretations of the "drag queen".

== Origin ==
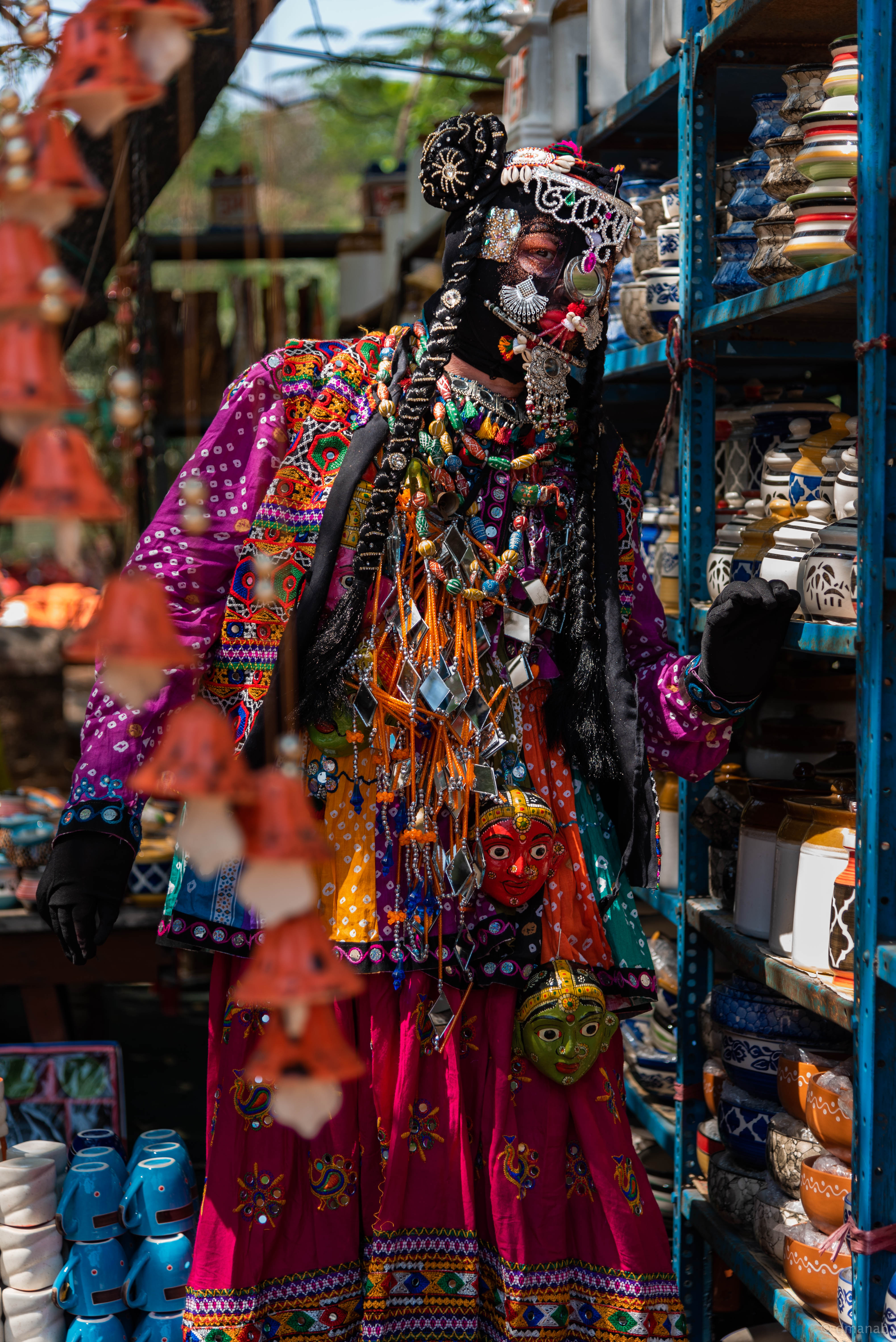
Tranimal Drag

The term "tranimal" was coined by artist Jer Ber Jones. Jer Ber Jones is responsible for starting the movement and popularizing the movement in 2006, and again in early 2007 with the original stage production of the dance musical FOWL, a collaboration with choreographer Ryan Heffington, which grew into a drag and performance art scene based in Los Angeles.

In contrast to traditional genres of drag such as camp and pageant, tranimal drag de-constructs fashion and make-up, often using found objects, and elements of surrealism. A visual emphasis was placed on hiding or exaggerating male attributes, but not necessarily shaving, tucking or plucking, creating a constant push and pull between the genders. The tranimal movement was inspired by Leigh Bowery, Radical Faeries, the Cockettes, Boy George, Grace Jones, Cindy Sherman and John Waters.

Austin Young and collaborators further popularized the look and ethos of Tranimal through portraiture work around the genre.

In 2011 the movement reached a mainstream audience when actress Ann Magnuson suggested to the Los Angeles Times that a "Tranimal Makeover Station be erected mid-way on the red carpet." (For the televised Oscar Awards Ceremony.). In 2019, Indian Drag artist Patruni Sastry presented tranimal drag with indianism at Hyderabad Literature festival.

== Tranimal Workshop ==
The first public Tranimal Workshop event, held at Mark Allen's Machine Project in 2009, contextualized the movement and moved it into a participatory, open-source series of events. Each event culminated in a series of photographs shot by Austin Young. The concept of the Tranimal Workshop was a collaboration between by Austin Young, Squeaky Blonde and Fade-Dra. Participating artists have also included Matthu Andersen, Jer Ber Jones, Andrew Marlin, Jason El Diablo, and many others. The first workshop was co-produced by Austin Young and Saskia Wilson-Brown in conjunction with Ultra Fabulous Beyond Drag, Part Deux in 2007, and Ultra Fabulous Beyond Drag, Part Deux in 2009. These two film programs in Los Angeles were complemented by guest performances from artists such The Steve Lady, Jer Ber Jones, and Squeaky Blonde, among others. The Ultra Fabulous screenings served to coalesce the filmic elements of the movement in one place, for the first time.

Since the initial event, the workshop has been further developed by many of the original organizers with Austin Young at the helm, and has expanded to various venues including Los Angeles' Hammer Museum in 2010 and the Berkeley Art Museum in 2011.

== Tranimal performers ==
- Jer Ber Jones
- Squeaky Blonde
- Jackie Hell
- Vain Hein
- Andrew Tran
- Violet Blonde
- Patruni Sastry
- Monikkie Shame
- Alisson Gothz
- Fade-Dra Phey
