= Miss Perfect =

Indian romantic comedy television series

- Promotional poster
- Genre: Comedy; Romance
- Screenplay by: Francis Thomas; Shruti Ramachandran
- Story by: Francis Thomas; Shruti Ramachandran
- Directed by: Vishvak Khanderao
- Starring: Lavanya Tripathi; Abijeet Duddala; Abhignya Vuthaluru
- Music by: Prashanth R Vihari
- Country of origin: India
- Original language: Telugu
- No. of seasons: 1
- No. of episodes: 8

Production
- Executive producer: Anand Reddy Karnati
- Producer: Supriya Yarlagadda
- Cinematography: Aditya Javvadi
- Editor: Raviteja Girijala
- Running time: 20–26 minutes
- Production company: Annapurna Studios

Original release
- Network: Disney+ Hotstar
- Release: 2 February 2024

Miss Perfect is an Indian Telugu-language romantic comedy television series directed by Vishvak Khanderao, and written by Francis Thomas and Shruti Ramachandran. Produced by Annapurna Studios, it stars Lavanya Tripathi, Abijeet Duddala and Abhignya Vuthaluru in important roles.

It was released on 2 February 2024 on Disney+ Hotstar.

== Cast ==
- Lavanya Tripathi as Lavanya Rao / Lakshmi
- Abijeet Duddala as Rohit Varma
- Abhignya Vuthaluru as Jyoti
- Jhansi as Rajyalakshmi
- Harsha Vardhan as Gokul, Lavanya Rao's father
- Mahesh Vitta as Sreenu
- Harsh Roshan as Karthik
- Mohana Sree Suraaga
- Manik Reddy
- Keshav Deepak
- Sunaina Badam
- VS Rupa Lakshmi as Sreedevi, Rohit's mother
- Honey Singh Thakur
- Ramya Yadavalli
- Satish Saripalli
- K. M. Radha Krishnan in a cameo appearance as himself
- Siddharth Gollapudi as Manager

== Episodes ==
No.	Title	Directed by	Written by	Original release date
1	"Lavanya's 'Problem'"	Vishvak Khanderao	Francis Thomas, Shruti Ramachandran	2 February 2024
2	"A WhiteLie"	Vishvak Khanderao	Francis Thomas, Shruti Ramachandran	2 February 2024
3	"An Unusual Crush"	Vishvak Khanderao	Francis Thomas, Shruti Ramachandran	2 February 2024
4	"The Three Spies"	Vishvak Khanderao	Francis Thomas, Shruti Ramachandran	2 February 2024
5	"A Secret Romance"	Vishvak Khanderao	Francis Thomas, Shruti Ramachandran	2 February 2024
6	"Who is Lakshmi?"	Vishvak Khanderao	Francis Thomas, Shruti Ramachandran	2 February 2024
7	"A MessyPickle"	Vishvak Khanderao	Francis Thomas, Shruti Ramachandran	2 February 2024
8	"Not So Perfect"	Vishvak Khanderao	Francis Thomas, Shruti Ramachandran	2 February 2024

== Reception ==
Sangeetha Devi Dundoo of The Hindu gave a mixed review saying the series "rides on a wafer thin storyline". Abhilasha Cherukuri of The New Indian Express gave a rating of 3 out if 5 and stated, "Miss Perfect is short and sweet, like a chick-lit novel". Times Now rated it 2.5 out of 5 calling it "breezy yet cliched".

== See also ==
- List of Disney+ Hotstar original programming
