= Mirchi Lanti Kurradu =

2015 Indian film by Jayanag

- Poster
- Directed by: Jayanag
- Written by: Jayanag
- Produced by: Rudrapati Ramanarao
- Starring: Abijeet; Pragya Jaiswal
- Cinematography: R. M. Swamy
- Edited by: Prawin Pudi
- Music by: Jeevan Babu
- Production company: Sri Lakshmi Venkateshwara Cinema
- Release date: 31 July 2015
- Country: India
- Language: Telugu

Mirchi Lanti Kurradu (transl. A spicy boy) is a 2015 Indian Telugu-language romantic drama directed by Jayanag and starring Abijeet and Pragya Jaiswal with Rao Ramesh, Shakalaka Shankar, and Saptagiri among others in supporting roles.

The film's title is based on a lyric from the song "Mirchi Mirchi" from Mirchi (2013).

== Cast ==
- Abijeet as Siddhu
- Pragya Jaiswal as Vasundhara
- Rao Ramesh
- Shakalaka Shankar
- Saptagiri
- Fish Venkat
- Prabhas Sreenu
- Prudhviraj
- Raghu Karumanchi
- Venu Yeldandi

== Production ==
The film began production in April 2014. Abijeet of Life Is Beautiful (2012) fame and Pragya Jaiswal were cast to play the lead roles. Abijeet worked out and sported six packs for the film.

== Soundtrack ==
The music was composed by J. B. The audio was scheduled to release on 19 October 2014; but was postponed to 13 November. The function was attended by Nandamuri Balakrishna. In a review of the film's soundtrack, a critic from The Times of India noted that "The album sticks to a formula and plays it safe with not much experimentation".

No.	Title	Lyrics	Singer(s)	Length
1.	"Pillemo Kathilaga"	Bhaskara Bhatla	Hymath, Rohith	3:46
2.	"Ninne Chusinaka"	Vasista Sharma	Anudeep Dev, Ramya Behara	4:46
3.	"Types Of Love"	Bhaskara Bhatla	Revanth, Ramya Behara, Sindhuri	3:37
4.	"Mirchi Lanti Kurrade"	Varikuppala Yadgiri	Sai Shivani, Revanth	3:34
5.	"Luck Is My Name"	Kittu Visapradaga	Revanth	3:52
Total length:				19:35

== Release and reception ==
The film was scheduled to release in December 2014, but was delayed and ended up releasing in 2015.

=== Reception ===
The Times of India gave the film a rating of two out of five stars and stated that "All in all, Mirchi Lanti Kurradu is a run of the mill love story with a predictable climax starring Abijeet Duddala and Pragya Jaiswal. There is nothing different in the film". 123Telugu rated the film 2.5/5 and termed the film a "routine love story." While praising the performances of the lead cast, the reviewer opined that the predictable screenplay has let down the film.
