= Dragvanti =

Dragvanti (stylized DragVanti) is a web portal dedicated to drag performers based in India.

== History ==
DragVanti was launched on June 20, 2020 by Patruni Sastry. The platform also connects emerging drag artists to the entertainment industry. Originally, DragVanti was only a website. It became a monthly publication from 2019 to 2021 that was circulated online for no cost. The drag directory was launched in June 2020.

Patruni Sastry who founded the platform says "When I started performing drag in 2019, there was no content about Indian drag available; the only content coming in was that from the West, However Drag is present in classical Indian culture with a mention of it occurs in the Nātya Śāstra, a record of Indian performance art estimated to be around 2,000 years old. Yet today, We don’t acknowledge what drag artists are doing within India” when asked about the intent of creating such a platform.

== Events ==
- In 2020 June, DragVanti co-hosted Pride Online fest in collaboration with Social Samosa where there was a curated drag panel discussions and performances.
- In August 2020, DragVanti hosted a TED circle for drag performers.
- In 2021 March, DragVanti hosted an open online mic evenings via its social media handle.
- In 2021 June, as a part of pride month celebration, Dragvanti has organized India's first ever Drag conference with more than 6 drag queens to initiate academic discussions in the field of drag.
- In 2021 August, DragVanti hosted India's first ever BI/PAN festival to create awareness on Bisexuality and Pansexuality spectrums.
- DragVanti also hosts annual celebration of queer Halloween.
