= Bigg Boss Agnipariksha =

Telugu language reality TV game show

- Show's second season logo with Host and Judges
- Presented by: Sreemukhi (S1–present)
- Judges: Abijeet (S1–present); Bindu Madhavi (S1–present); Navdeep (S1–present)
- Country of origin: India
- Original language: Telugu
- No. of seasons: 2
- No. of episodes: 15

Production
- Production location: Annapurna Studios
- Running time: 45–60 minutes (approx.)
- Production company: Endemol Shine India

Original release
- Network: Star Maa; JioHotstar
- Release: 22 August 2025 – present

Related
- Bigg Boss; Bigg Boss Non-Stop

Bigg Boss Agnipariksha is a spin-off and pre-show of the Indian Telugu-language reality television show Bigg Boss. The pre-show involves selecting commoner contestants for the main show. It airs on Star Maa and streams on JioHotstar in India.

The show began in 2025 with former contestants Sreemukhi as host and Abijeet, Bindu Madhavi, and Navdeep as judges. The winners will compete as commoner contestants in the main Bigg Boss house.

== Series overview ==
| Season | Host | Judges | | | Episodes | Originally released | | | Contestants | | |
| Season | Host | Judges | | | Episodes | First released | Last released | Network | Auditioned | Selected for Agnipariksha | Entered in Main Season |
|---|---|---|---|---|---|---|---|---|---|---|---|
| 1 | Sreemukhi | Abijeet | Bindu Madhavi | Navdeep | 15 | 22 August 2025 | 5 September 2025 | JioHotstar | 45 | 15 | 7 |
| 2 | Sreemukhi | Abijeet | Bindu Madhavi | Navdeep | 22 | 15 August 2025 | 5 September 2026 | Star Maa, JioHotstar | 62 | 15 | 9 |

== Contestants pattern ==
The contestants who are selected for the final round are only listed here. In the first season, 15 contestants reached the final level. The winners will enter the main Bigg Boss house as commoner contestants.

| Seasons | Season 1 (BBS9) | Season 2 (BBS10) |
|---|---|---|
| Top Contestants | Anusha | Aman Masud |
| Top Contestants | Dahila | Aproova |
| Top Contestants | Demon Pavan | Bhagi Tulluri |
| Top Contestants | Divya Nikhitha | Charan Mahadev |
| Top Contestants | Harita Harish | Gayathri Vardhan |
| Top Contestants | Kalki | Hemanth Kumar Yadav |
| Top Contestants | Kalyan Padala | Jhansi |
| Top Contestants | Maryada Manish | Lakshmi Deepak Senapathy |
| Top Contestants | Prasanna | Mithilesh Reddy |
| Top Contestants | Priya Shetty | Priyanka |
| Top Contestants | Naga | Rajakumari Dayana |
| Top Contestants | Shakib | Ramakrishna |
| Top Contestants | Shreya | Rohit Naidu Patnam |
| Top Contestants | Shwetha | Shalini Patel |
| Top Contestants | Srija Dammu | Shiva Srishti Vyakaranam |
| Total | 15 | 15 |
Entered into Main Season

== See also ==
- Bigg Boss Agnipareeksha, Malayalam adaptation of the show.
- Bigg Boss The Common Man, Tamil-language adaptation of the show.
- BB Jodi
