= In Transit (Indian TV series) =

- Directed by: Ayesha Sood
- Starring: Anubhuti Banerjee, Rumi Harish, Patruni Sastry, Siddharth dope, Rie, Teena, Aryan, Madhuri
- Country of origin: India
- Original languages: Hindi, English

Production
- Producers: Zoya Aktar, Reema Kagti
- Cinematography: Archana Ghangrekar
- Animator: Harkat Studios
- Production company: Tiger Baby Productions

Original release
- Network: Amazon Prime Video
- Release: 13 June 2025

In Transit is a 2025 Indian English-language documentary series directed by Ayesha Sood and produced by Zoya Akhtar and Reema Kagti under the Tiger Baby Films banner. The four-part docuseries premiered on Amazon Prime Video on 13 June 2025 and explores the lives of nine transgender and non-binary individuals across India. It presents personal narratives around gender identity, societal acceptance, family relationships, and personal transformation.

== Cast ==
- Patruni Sastry, a performance artist and drag queen
- Aryan Somayian, a clinical psychologist from Mumbai
- Rumi Harish, a classical musician
- Siddharth Dope, a school educator from Tripura
- Anubhuti Banerjee, a software employee
- Saher Naaz, a surgeon
- Teena, a school teacher
- Madhuri Sarode, an actress, dancer and activist
- Rie Raut, a Dalit trans activist

== Production ==
In Transit was conceptualized following feedback from audiences about the representation of trans characters in Indian media, particularly in the series Made in Heaven. The creators undertook over 18 months of research and development to ensure the authenticity and diversity of stories. The production aimed to cover different geographies across India and capture a wide range of lived experiences within the trans and non-binary spectrum.

The series was filmed in a documentary style, blending interviews with observational footage. Director Ayesha Sood is known for her socially engaged work and brought an empathetic, non-intrusive approach to the filming process.

== Release ==
The series was released globally on Amazon Prime Video on 13 June 2025. Its launch was timed to coincide with Pride Month, and it was accompanied by promotional events, media coverage, and discussions on gender inclusivity in India.

== Reception ==
In Transit received widespread acclaim from critics, activists, and audiences for its nuanced and empathetic portrayal of transgender and non-binary lives in India. Reviewers praised the series for steering clear of sensationalism and instead focusing on the lived realities of its subjects with dignity and honesty. Hindustan Times described it as "a sensitively told portrait" that captures emotional moments of reconciliation, resistance, and revelation. Social Ketchup highlighted its quiet power, calling it "familiar yet vital," noting how its repetition of certain struggles emphasizes the urgent need for visibility and systemic change. Many lauded director Ayesha Sood's ability to create a space where participants could authentically share their truths, with critics emphasizing that the docuseries lets people speak for themselves rather than being spoken about. The representation was celebrated for its diversity—not just in terms of gender identity, but also in its inclusion of different regions, socio-economic classes, languages, and faith backgrounds making In Transit one of the most comprehensive explorations of India's queer and trans spectrum to date. Industry voices have since called it a landmark in queer storytelling, applauding its potential to spark essential conversations around inclusivity, media responsibility, and allyship. In Transit has been nominated for GLAAD media awards for 2025 in outstanding documentary category.
