= Austin Young =

American photographer (born 1966)

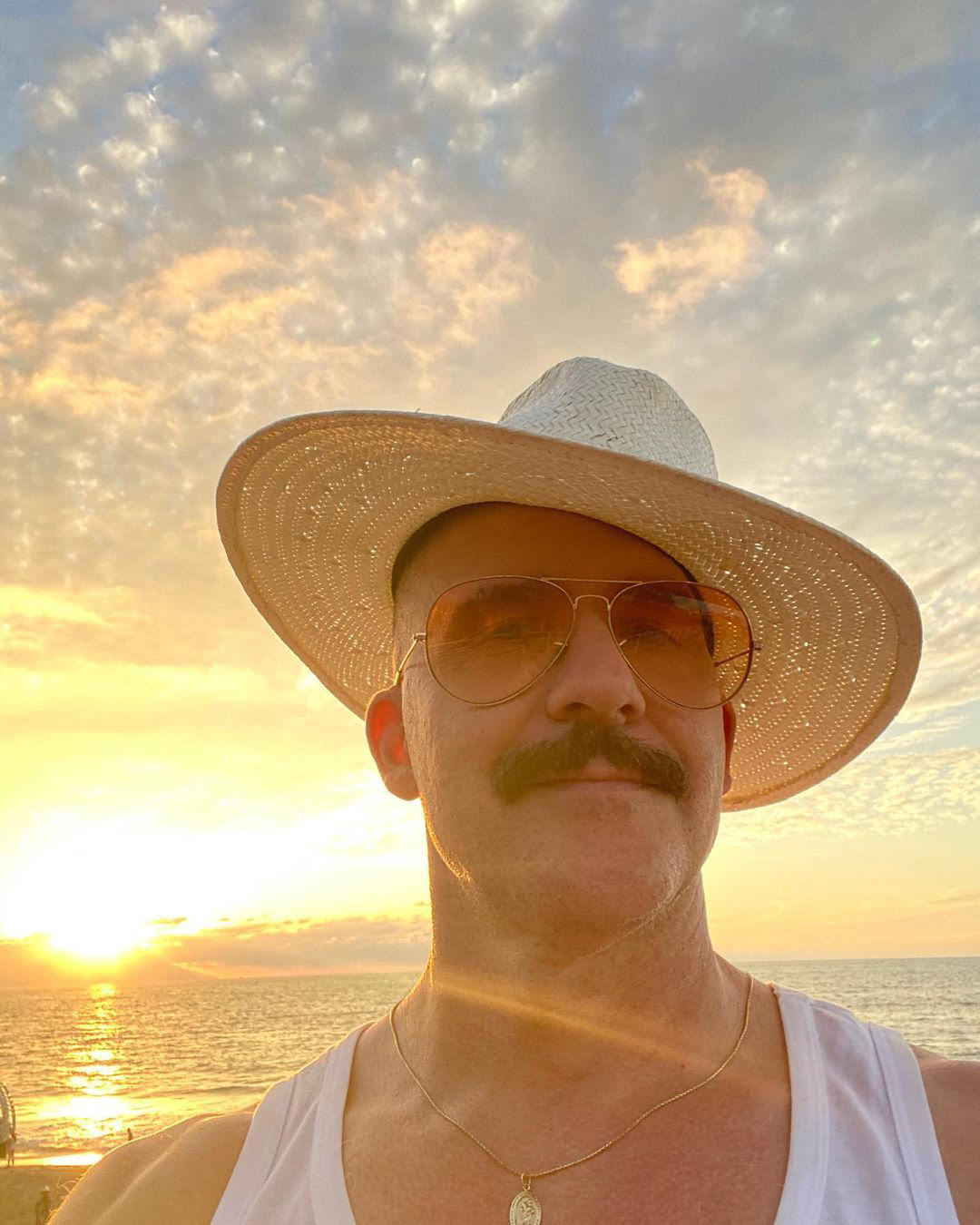
- Young in 2014
- Born: April 12, 1966 (age 60); Reno, Nevada, U.S.
- Occupations: fine art photography Video artist Installation artist New media arts

Austin Young (born April 12, 1966) is an American photographer, film maker and new media artist based in Los Angeles, known for both celebrity portraits and documentation of sub and trans culture. Young is co-founder of Fallen Fruit, an art collective that uses fruit as a common denominator for public engagement and collaboration.

== Career ==
Since 1985, Young has been documenting pop, sub, and trans culture while playing with the themes of camp (style), celebrity, gender and identity through portrait photography and film.

Young is one of the creators of the open-source Tranimal Workshop events, launched in 2009 at Machine Project in Los Angeles. The concept of the Tranimal Workshop was a collaboration among Young, Squeaky Blonde and Fade-Dra, with the participation of Mathu Andersen, Jer Ber Jones, Andrew Marlin, and others.

Young's solo art exhibit “YOUR FACE HERE” took place on January 29, 2011 at Pop tART Gallery. Young established his art studio for a five-week residency at Pop tART Gallery in Los Angeles.

In 2025, Young created the site-specific installation Temple of Flowers (Il Piccolo Paradiso), commissioned by the Chiostro del Bramante for the exhibition Flowers: Art from the Renaissance to Artificial Intelligence.

== Features and shorts ==
Young's film projects include:

Year	Title	Type	Notes
2003	Hadda Brooks: Queen of the Boogie	Feature Film	Co-director with Barry Pett
2013-2015	TBD, The Musical	Feature Film, Musical	Creator, Director
2006-2021	The Worm	Short, Series	Directed, Creator by Austin Young, with Nadya Ginsburg
2005	Queen Please		Directed by Austin Young, with Margaret Cho, Vaginal Davis and Jackie Beat
	Fish Power	Short	with Margaret Cho and Selene Luna and Johnny Smith
	The Stroke	Short	Co-directed with Barry Pett,
	Portrait of the Infamous Boom Boom	Short	Director
	Portrait of Selene Luna	Short	Director
2021	Jump Cut #3 - THEM	Short	Director, with Alaska, Willam, Laganja, Peaches
