= Little Flower Junior College =

Little Flower Junior College (LFJC)
- Uppal Kalan, Hyderabad, Telangana; India

Information
- Established: 1974
- Founder: Montfort Brothers
- Principal: Rev. Bro. Arun Prakash
- Language: English, Telugu and Hindi
- Hours in school day: 8
- Campuses: Intermediate
- Campus type: Urban
- Sports: Basketball, cricket, football, table tennis, badminton, throwball, volleyball, athletics
- Affiliation: TSBIE
- Website: lfjc.co.in

Little Flower Junior College (LFJC) is a college in Hyderabad, India offering Intermediate education (+2 level). It was established by the Montfort Brothers of St. Gabriel. It started in July 1974 as a part of Little Flower High School, It shifted to its own campus at Uppal in July 1982.

== Little Flower Junior College ==
Little Flower Junior College is a Catholic minority institution established by the Montfort Brothers of St. Gabriel. At present the college buildings comprise two imposing four storied-blocks. Spacious grounds and plenty of greenery all round, give the college an impressive look and create a congenial atmosphere for academic pursuits. From about 200 students when the college functioned in the school premises, today the number of students has risen to 1600.

== History ==
Little Flower Junior College was established in 1974 by upgrading the High School of the same name in Abids, Hyderabad. The need for the college arose as a result of a change in the Government's education policy. The multipurpose scheme was given up in favor of the Junior college systems

The interest shown by the chief Minister Mr. Vengal Rao, led to the grant of a piece of land in Ranga Reddy District and LFJC began to take shape. There was an initial difficulty in the form of paucity of funds. So LFJC began its life in the school premises itself with two sections, one each of MPC and BPC. The college functioned there for eight years.

Work on the building at Uppal, was taken up in 1980. The late Bro. James Pannivelil was placed in charge, Mr. Srinath Magal was the Engineer and Architect, and the college shifted to its present premises on 1 July 1982. A small auditorium was built in 1989. An additional floor on top of the office block was finished in 1998

Co-education was introduced in 1997.
