= Abijeet =

Indian actor (born 1988)

Abijeet Duddala
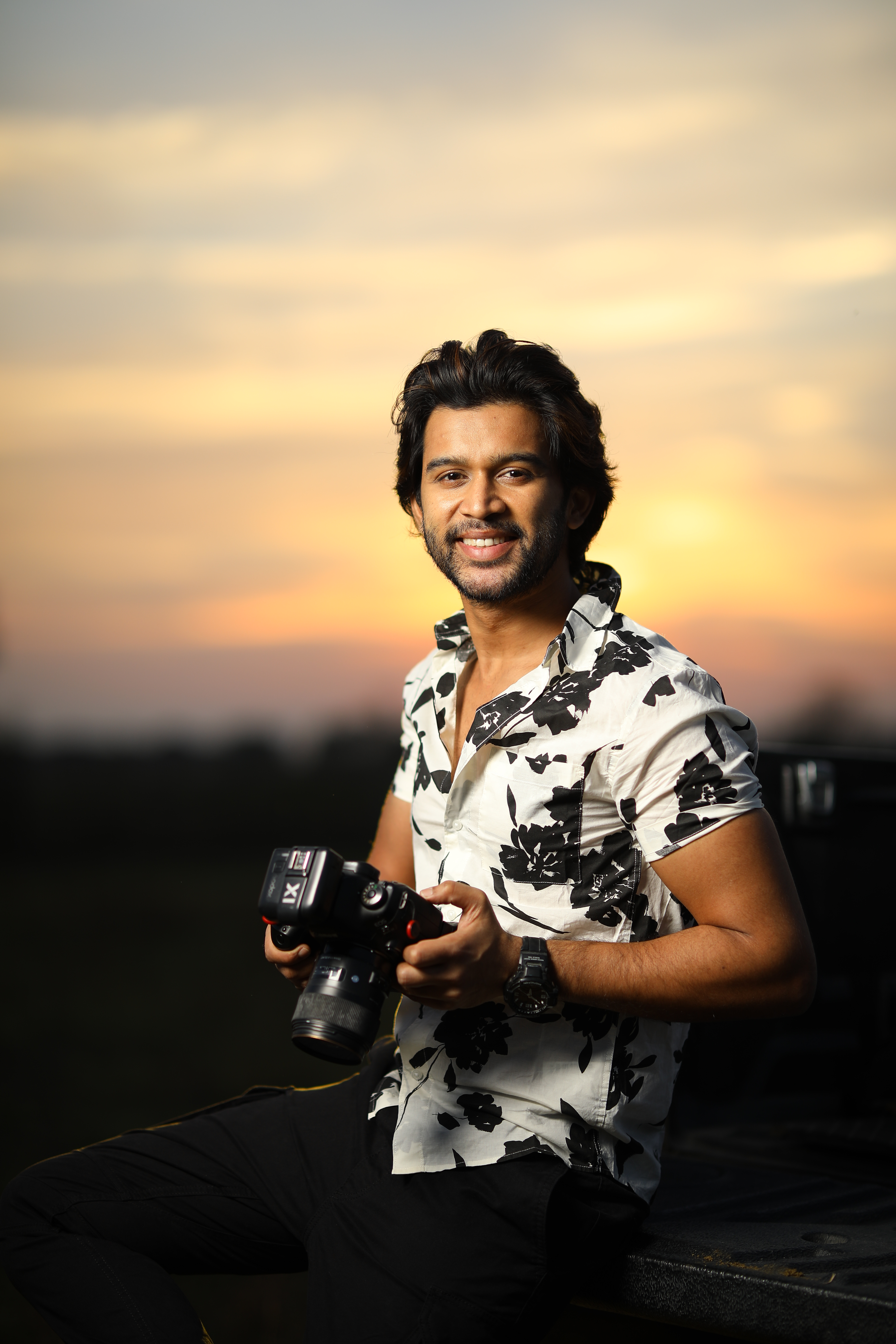
- Abijeet in 2017
- Born: 11 October 1988 (age 38); Hyderabad, Andhra Pradesh (now Telangana), India
- Education: Malla Reddy College; Northeastern University (M.S.)
- Occupations: Actor; Television personality
- Years active: 2012–present
- Awards: Bigg Boss Telugu 4 – Winner (2020)

Abijeet Duddala (born 11 October 1988) is an Indian actor and television personality who works in Telugu cinema. He made his debut as a lead actor in the film Life Is Beautiful, directed by Sekhar Kammula in 2012. He starred in the web series Pelli Gola (2017–19), Modern Love Hyderabad (2022), and Miss Perfect (2024). In 2020, Abijeet emerged as the winner of Star Maa’s reality TV show Bigg Boss 4.

== Early life ==
Abijeet was born on 11 October 1988 in Hyderabad. His ancestors were involved in assisting in the construction of the Charminar. His family continues to work in the construction industry. He was enrolled in Chaitanya Vidyalaya for kindergarten. He completed his Class 10 at Rishi Valley School, Madanapalle and He then completed his Class 12 at Little Flower Junior College, and graduated from Malla Reddy College with a BTech in Aeronautical Engineering.

During his final year of college, he accompanied his friend to the audition for the film Life Is Beautiful where he was selected for the main lead role by Sekhar Kammula's team. He subsequently was cast as the main lead of the film in 2012, as Amala Akkineni's character's son.

In 2015, Abijeet attended Northeastern University in Boston, Massachusetts to get a Master of Science in Engineering Management.

== Career ==
Abijeet made his debut in the Telugu feature film Life Is Beautiful directed by Sekhar Kammula. He then signed up for the film Areyrey, titled after a song from Happy Days, under the direction of Sashi Kiran Tikka, and produced by Neelima Tirumalasetti. The film remains unreleased.

In 2015, he starred in the romantic films Ram Leela, and Mirchi Lanti Kurradu alongside Pragya Jaiswal. Regarding his performance in the latter film, a critic noted that "Abhijit, nevertheless did a decent job and has a high energy in the film. He did a decent job in NASA and showcased good energy levels throughout the film. His comic timing is good and he displayed good emotions throughout the film". In 2017, Abijeet made his television debut with Viu's web series Pelli Gola opposite Varshini Sounderajan. The series was successful and he went on to feature in two more seasons.

In 2020, Abijeet entered the fourth season of the reality show Bigg Boss Telugu as a contestant, and emerged as the winner.

== Filmography ==
=== Films ===
Key
†	Denotes films that have not yet been released

Year	Title	Role	Notes	Ref.
2012	Life Is Beautiful	Srinu	Debut film	
2015	Ram Leela	Krish		
2015	Mirchi Lanti Kurradu	Siddhu		

=== Television ===
Year	Title	Role	Network	Notes	Ref.
2017–2019	Pelli Gola	Varun	Viu		
2020	Bigg Boss 4	Contestant	Star Maa	Winner	
2022	Modern Love Hyderabad	Ashwin	Amazon Prime Video	Under Segment "What Clown Wrote This Script?"	
2024	Miss Perfect	Rohit Varma	Disney+ Hotstar		
2025	Bigg Boss Agnipariksha	Judge	JioHotstar		
