= BB Jodi =

Indian Telugu language Reality show

- Genre: Reality dance show
- Based on: BB Jodigal
- Presented by: Sreemukhi (Season 1); Pradeep Machiraju (Season 2)
- Judges: Radha (Season 1); Tarun Master (Season 1); Sadha (Season 1-2); Sridevi Vijaykumar (Season 2); Sekhar (Season 2)
- Opening theme: BB Jodi by Roll Rida
- Country of origin: India
- Original language: Telugu
- No. of seasons: 2
- No. of episodes: 55

Production
- Production location: Hyderabad
- Camera setup: Multi-camera
- Running time: 40-50 minutes
- Production companies: Endemol Shine India (Season 1); Play Media Creations (Season 2)

Original release
- Network: Star Maa
- Release: 25 December 2022 – 29 March 2026

Bigg Boss: Jodi, also known as BB Jodi, is a 2022 Indian Telugu language reality television Dance show, which premiered on 25 December 2022 and broadcast on Star Maa and streamed on JioHotstar.

In November 2025, the show was renewed for a second season, which premiered on 27 December 2025 and broadcast on Star Maa and streamed on JioHotstar.

== Format ==
The show has the concept of Bigg Boss celebrities competing against one another in a dance competition. It is inspired from the Tamil show BB Jodigal. The show follows a dance show format where past Bigg Boss contestants dance in pairs in a competition that leads to a final winning Jodi.

Contestants are judged and eliminated on the basis of their performances and the last remaining Jodi will be considered as the winner of Bigg Boss Jodi.

== Series overview ==
Series	Host	Episodes	Originally released		Pairs	Prize Money	Winners	Runners-up
Series	Host	Episodes	First released	Last released	Pairs	Prize Money	Winners	Runners-up
1	Sreemukhi	27	25 December 2022	26 March 2023	10	₹25 lakh (US$26,000)	RJ Surya & Faima Sheikh	Avinash & Ariyana Glory
2	Pradeep Machiraju	28	27 December 2025	29 March 2025	9	₹15 lakh (US$16,000)	Maanas & Shrasti Verma	Vishwa Raj & Neha Chowdary

== Season 1 ==
The first season premiered on Sunday, 25 December 2022. Sadha, Radha and Tarun Master as the judges, Television host Sreemukhi as the host.

=== Contestants ===
Group (Week 2-11)	Jodis (Pairs)		Entry	Exit	Result	Place
Dhamaka Jodi	Faima Sheikh; Bigg Boss 6	RJ Surya; Bigg Boss 6	Episode 1	Episode 27	Winner	1
Pataka Jodi	Ariyana Glory; Bigg Boss 4 & Non-Stop	Avinash Kalla; Bigg Boss 4	Episode 1	Episode 27	Runner-up	2
Dhamaka Jodi (Week 2-5); Pataka Jodi (Week 6-11)	Vasanthi Krishnan; Bigg Boss 6	Arjun Kalyan; Bigg Boss 6	Episode 1	Episode 27	Finalist	3
Pataka Jodi	Sri Satya (Note: Originally, Mehaboob Shaikh was paired with Ashu Reddy (Bigg Boss 3 & Non-Stop), but Ashu couldn't join for week 2 & 3. Sri Satya replaced her from week 4 onwards.); Bigg Boss 6	Mehaboob Shaikh; Bigg Boss 4	Episode 1	Episode 27	Finalist	4
Dhamaka Jodi	Kajal Seelamsetty; Bigg Boss 5	RJ Chaitu; Bigg Boss Non-Stop	Episode 1	Episode 27	Finalist	5
Dhamaka Jodi	Tejaswi Madivada; Bigg Boss 2 & Non-Stop	Akhil Sarthak; Bigg Boss 4 & Non-Stop	Episode 1	Episode 25	Eliminated	6
Dhamaka Jodi	Abhinaya Shree; Bigg Boss 6	Kaushal Manda; Bigg Boss 2	Episode 6	Episode 21	Eliminated	7
Pataka Jodi	Bhanu Sree; Bigg Boss 2	Ravi Krishna; Bigg Boss 3	Episode 1	Episode 17	Eliminated	8
Pataka Jodi	Marina Abraham; Bigg Boss 6	Rohit Sahni; Bigg Boss 6	Episode 7	Episode 9	Eliminated	9
Pataka Jodi	Inaya Sultana (Note: Originally, Roll Rida was paired with Sravanthi Chokarapu (Bigg Boss Non-Stop), but Inaya Sultana replaced her on Grand Launch.); Bigg Boss 6	Roll Rida; Bigg Boss 2	Episode 1	Episode 5	Eliminated	10

=== Scoring History ===
==== Legend ====
indicates that the pair was the highest scorer of the episode.
indicates that the pair was the lowest scorer of the episode.
indicates that the pair was eliminated.

Week -	2		3		Combine Score (Note: Based on the combine score from past 2 weeks, the least scoring pair from both groups were in Danger Zone.)	4		5		Combine Score	6 (Note: Judges Challenge: Faima & Surya - African Fusion; Chaitu & Kajal - Hip-Hop; Abhinaya & Kaushal - Cabaret; Akhil & Tejaswi - Kathakali; Bhanu & Ravi - Paso doble; Ariyana & Avinash - Semi Classical & Bharatanatyam; Arjun & Vasanthi - Flamenco; Mehaboob & Sri - Salsa.)		7		Combine Score	8		9		Combine Score	10		11		Combine Score	12	13	Combine Score	14 : Final	
Episode -	2	3	4	5	Combine Score	6	7	8	9	Combine Score	10	11	12	13	Combine Score	14	15	16	17	Combine Score	18	19	20	21	Combine Score	22-23	24-25	Combine Score	26-27	
Faima & Surya	84		99		183	92.5		92		184.5	82		98		180	63		95		158	63		93		156	72	98	170	Winner	
Ariyana & Avinash		71		86	157		83		99	182		98		88	186		93		81	174		96		94	190	84	88	172	Runner-up	
Arjun & Vasanthi	82		67		149	83		89.5		172.5		94		97	191		81		90	171		93		82	175	96	96	192	3rd Place	
Mehaboob & Sri (Note: Sri Satya replaced Ashu Reddy from Week 4 onwards.)		73 (Note: Ashu was not present for the performance, they were scored based on Mehaboob's solo performance.)		55	128		76		95	171		98		93	191		92		87	179		91		76	167	100	100	200	4th Place	
Chaitu & Kajal	76		87		163	92.5		90		182.5	84		84		168	87		93		180	58		95		153	56	91	147	5th Place	
Akhil & Tejaswi	99		96		195	78		92.5		170.5	97		90		187	84		88		172	70		78		148	91	71	162	Eliminated	
Abhinaya & Kaushal	Not in Competition					89		93		182	90		86		178	67		92		159	93		51		144	Eliminated				
Bhanu & Ravi		95		95	190		98		97	195		99		98	197		67		62	129	Eliminated									
Marina & Rohit	Not in Competition						74		55	129	Eliminated																			
Inaya & Roll		78		36	114	Eliminated																								
Danger Zone	Arjun & Vasanthi; Inaya & Roll					Akhil & Tejaswi; Marina & Rohit					Chaitu & Kajal; Ariyana & Avinash					Faima & Surya; Bhanu & Ravi					Abhinaya & Kaushal; Mehaboob & Sri					Akhil & Tejaswi; Chaitu & Kajal			Chaitu & Kajal	
Danger Zone	Arjun & Vasanthi; Inaya & Roll					Akhil & Tejaswi; Marina & Rohit					Chaitu & Kajal; Ariyana & Avinash					Faima & Surya; Bhanu & Ravi					Abhinaya & Kaushal; Mehaboob & Sri					Akhil & Tejaswi; Chaitu & Kajal			Mehaboob & Sri	Arjun & Vasanthi
Eliminated	Inaya & Roll					Marina & Rohit					No Elimination					Bhanu & Ravi					Abhinaya & Kaushal					Akhil & Tejaswi			Ariyana & Avinash	Faima & Surya

=== Detailed Score Pattern ===
Jodis Score + Judges Score = Total Score

Week	Episode	Judges Score (70 pts.)			Jodis Score (30 pts.)
Week	Episode	Radha	Sadha	Tarun	Jodis Score (30 pts.)
2	2-3	30 pts.	20pts.	20 pts.	10 pts. each pair
3	4-5	20pts.	20 pts.	30 pts.	10 pts. each pair
4	6	20pts.	30 pts.	20pts.	Dhamaka Jodis - 7.5 pts. each pair
4	7	20pts.	30 pts.	20pts.	Pataka Jodis- 10 pts. each pair
5	8	30 pts.	20pts.	20pts.	Dhamaka Jodis - 7.5 pts. each pair
5	9	30 pts.	20pts.	20pts.	Pataka Jodis- 10 pts. each pair
6	10-11	20pts.	20 pts.	30 pts.	10 pts. each pair
7	12-13	20pts.	30 pts.	20pts.	10 pts. each pair
8	14-15	30 pts.	20pts.	20pts.	10 pts. each pair
9	16-17	20pts.	20 pts.	30 pts.	10 pts. each pair
10	18	20pts.	30 pts.	20pts.	Dhamaka Jodis - 10 pts. each pair
10	19	20pts.	30 pts.	20pts.	Pataka Jodis- 15 pts. each pair
11	20	30 pts.	20pts.	20pts.	Dhamaka Jodis - 10 pts. each pair
11	21	30 pts.	20pts.	20pts.	Pataka Jodis- 15 pts. each pair
12	22-23	20pts.	20 pts.	30 pts.	6 pts. each pair
13	24-25	20pts.	30 pts.	20pts.	6 pts. each pair
Week	Episode	Judges Score (150 pts.)			Jodis Score (0 pts.)
Week	Episode	Radha	Sadha	Tarun	Jodis Score (0 pts.)
14	26-25	50pts.	50pts.	50pts.	None

Jodis	Week 2	Week 3	Week 4	Week 5	Week 6	Week 7	Week 8	Week 9	Week 10	Week 11	Week 12	Week 13	Week 14
Faima & Surya	25+59=84	30+69=99	28.5+64=92.5	26+66=92	21+61=82	28+70=98	20+43=63	25+70=95	20+43=63	28+65=93	21+51=72	29+69=98	N/A
Ariyana & Avinash	19+52=71	21+65=86	24+59=83	29+70=99	28+70=98	24+64=88	25+68=93	22+59=81	27+69=96	27+67=94	25+59=84	25+63=88	N/A
Arjun & Vasanthi	25+57=82	21+46=67	24+59=83	26.5+63=89.5	24+70=94	27+70=97	23+58=81	20+70=90	23+70=93	24+58=82	26+70=96	28+68=96	N/A
Mehaboob & Sri	18+55=73	17+38=55	20+56=76	28+67=95	28+70=98	26+67=93	26+66=92	26+61=87	25+66=91	20+56=76	30+70=100	30+70=100	N/A
Chaitu & Kajal	24+52=76	25+62=87	26.5+66=92.5	27+63=90	24+60=84	24+60=84	25+62=87	26+67=93	18+40=58	27+68=95	13+43=56	25+66=91	N/A
Akhil & Tejaswi	30+69=99	28+68=96	23+55=78	26.5+66=92.5	27+70=97	24+66=90	23+61=84	23+65=88	20+50=70	23+55=78	26+65=91	17+54=71	Eliminated
Abhinaya & Kaushal	Not in Competition		27+62=89	27+66=93	22+68=90	24+62=86	22+45=67	27+65=92	28+65=93	16+35=51	Eliminated		
Bhanu & Ravi	29+66=95	28+67=95	29+69=98	28+69=97	29+70=99	29+69=98	21+46=67	30+32=62	Eliminated				
Marina & Rohit	Not in Competition		19+55=74	19+36=55	Eliminated								
Inaya & Roll	21+57=78	10+26=36	Eliminated										

=== Episodes ===
Episode	Airing	Round	Guests
1	25 December 2022	Grand Launch	Nagarjuna to support the contestants.
2	31 December 2022	Block Buster	Sreeleela to celebrate success of her new movie Dhamaka.
3	1 January 2023	Block Buster	-
4	7 January 2023	Props Round	-
5	8 January 2023	Props Round	-
6	14 January 2023	Celebration Round	-
7	15 January 2023	Celebration Round	-
8	21 January 2023	Superstar Round	-
9	22 January 2023	Superstar Round	-
10	28 January 2023	Judges Challenge Round	Anuradha - Special Appearance
11	29 January 2023	Judges Challenge Round	-
12	4 February 2023	Director's Special	-
13	5 February 2023	Director's Special	-
14	11 February 2023	Choreographers Special	-
15	12 February 2023	Choreographers Special	-
16	18 February 2023	Cinema Cinema Round	-
17	19 February 2023	Cinema Cinema Round	-
18	25 February 2023	Theenmar Special	Maanas Nagulapalli, Neha Chowdary, Priyanka Singh and Bindu Madhavi to support the pairs and dance with them.
19	26 February 2023	Theenmar Special	Amardeep, Swetha Naidu and Siddu to support the pairs and dance with them. Sneha - Special Appearance
20	4 March 2023	Retro Special	-
21	5 March 2023	Retro Special	-
22	11 March 2023	Connection Round	-
23	12 March 2023	Connection Round	-
24	18 March 2023	Semi-Finale	-
25	19 March 2023	Semi-Finale	-
26	25 March 2023	Grand Finale	Sekhar - Guest Judge; Sreerama Chandra & students - Special Performance
27	26 March 2023	Grand Finale	Ravi Krishna and Ashika Ranganath - Special Performance; BB Jodi Choreographers - Special Performance

== Season 2 ==
The second season premiered on Saturday, 27 December 2025 with Sridevi Vijaykumar, Sadha and Sekhar as the judges, Television host Pradeep Machiraju as the host.

=== Contestants ===
Group	Jodis (Pairs)		Hashtag	Entry	Exit	Result
Dhamaka Jodi	Maanas; Bigg Boss 5	Shrasti Verma; Bigg Boss 9	#MAVA	Episode 1	Episode 28	Winner
Dhamaka Jodi	Vishwa Raj; Bigg Boss 5	Neha Chowdary; Bigg Boss 6	#HAWA	Episode 1	Episode 28	Runner-up
Pataka Jodi	Amardeep Chowdary; Bigg Boss 7	Nainika Anasuru; Bigg Boss 8	#AMERIKA	Episode 1	Episode 28	Finalist
Pataka Jodi	Arjun Kalyan (Note: Was a contestant on BB Jodi Season 1.); Bigg Boss 6	Sri Satya; Bigg Boss 6	#ARYA	Episode 1	Episode 28	Finalist
Dhamaka Jodi	Dhanraj; Bigg Boss 1	Bhanu Sree; Bigg Boss 2	#BHAJA	Episode 1	Episode 27	Eliminated
Dhamaka Jodi	Naga Manikanta; Bigg Boss 8	Priyanka Singh; Bigg Boss 5	#TAKA	Episode 1	Episode 26	Eliminated
Pataka Jodi	Sai Srinivas; Bigg Boss 9	Kirrak Seetha (Note: Originally, Sai Srinivas was paired with Nayani Pavani (Bigg Boss 8), but Nayani quit the show in week 7. Kirrak Seetha replaced her from week 8 onwards.); Bigg Boss 8	#SESA; ~~#SANA~~	Episode 1	Episode 22	Quit
Pataka Jodi	Rithu; Bigg Boss 9	Demon Pavan; Bigg Boss 9	#RIVAN	Episode 7	Episode 18	Eliminated
Pataka Jodi	RJ Chaitu; Bigg Boss Non-Stop	Srija Dammu (Note: Originally, RJ Chaitu was paired with Keerthi Bhat (Bigg Boss 6), but Keerthi quit the show in week 6. Srija Dammu replaced her from week 6 onwards.); Bigg Boss 9	#KEECHU	Episode 1	Episode 14	Quit

=== Power Astras ===
Power Astra	Power Details	Power Holder	Used In	Used On
Red Power	Block Jodi Score	#HAWA; Vishwa Raj & Neha Chowdary	Unused	
Blue Power	Brownie Points	#SANA; Sai Srinivas & Nayani Pavani	Unused	
Yellow Power	Swap the Position	#KEECHU; RJ Chaitu & Keerthi Bhat	Week 5	Swapped their position with Bhanu & Dhanraj
Green Power	Power of Grab	#TAKA; Naga Manikanta & Priyanka Singh	Unused	
Brahmastra	Save from Elimination	#AMERIKA; Amardeep Chowdary & Nainika Anasuru	Decided not to use	

=== Scoring History ===
==== Legend ====
indicates that the pair was the highest scorer of the episode.
indicates that the pair was in the bottom with the lowest combine score.
indicates that the pair was eliminated.

Week	2	3	Combine Score (Note: Based on the combine score from past 2 weeks, the least scoring pair from both groups were in Danger Zone.)	4	5	Combine Score	6	7	Combine Score	8	9	Combine Score	10	11	Combine Score	12	13	Combine Score	14: Final	
Episode	3-4	5-6	Combine Score	7-8	9-10	Combine Score	11-12	13-14	Combine Score	15-16	17-18	Combine Score	19-20	21-22	Combine Score	23-24	25-26	Combine Score	27 (Note: Top 4 scoring pairs moved-on to Level 2 of Grand Finale.)	28
Maanas & Shrasti	93	86	179	87	80	167	89	100	189	83	87	170	96	99	195	85	100	185	93	Winner
Neha & Vishwa	78	82	160	94	89	183	85	85	170	91	98	180	81	95	176	69	90	159	76	Runner-up
Amardeep & Nainika	99	87	186	88.5	100	188.5	83	100	183	85	87	172	85	92	177	97	80	177	93	3rd Place
Arjun & Sri Satya	75	80	155	57.5	92	149.5	76	92.5	168.5	67	90	157	79	91	170	61	86	147	73	4th Place
Bhanu & Dhanraj	84	90	174	71	70	141 (Note: Chaitu & Keerthi were in the bottom two but used their Power Astra to swap positions with next lowest scoring pair Bhanu & Dhanraj.)	74	83	152 (Note: Bhanu & Dhanraj were eliminated in Episode 10, but were given a second chance with a disadvantage of -5 points in the next week's combine score.)	70	79	149	72	84	156	84	56	140	72	Eliminated
Manikanta & Priyanka	80	82	162	88	77	165	62	68	130	73	84	157	45	80	125	62	64	126	Eliminated	
Sai & Seetha (Note: Kirrak Seetha replaced Nayani Pavani from week 8 onwards.)	85	79	164	80	72	152	69	96.5	165.5	70	42	112	45	88	133	Quit				
Rithu & Pavan	Not in Competition			69.5	53	122.5	63	77	140	66	80	146	Eliminated							
Chaitu & Srija (Note: Srija Dammu replaced Keerthi Bhat from week 6 onwards.)	78	85	163	49	84	133	65	73	138	Quit										
Danger Zone	Arjun & Sri Satya; Neha & Vishwa			Rithu & Pavan; ~~Chaitu & Keerthi~~; Bhanu & Dhanraj			Manikanta & Priyanka; Chaitu & Srija			Sai & Seetha; Rithu & Pavan			Manikanta & Priyanka; Sai & Seetha			Manikanta & Priyanka; Bhanu & Dhanraj			none	
Eliminated	No Elimination			~~Bhanu & Dhanraj~~			none			Rithu & Pavan			none			Manikanta & Priyanka			Bhanu & Dhanraj	Arjun & Sri Satya
Quit	none						Keerthi (Note: Keerthi decided to quit the show due to personal reasons.)			none			Sai & Seetha (Note: Seetha had a injury and couldn't perform in danger zone and therefore decided to leave the show.)			none				Amardeep & Nainika
Quit	none						Nayani (Note: Nayani decided to quit the show due to mental health reasons.)			none			Sai & Seetha			none				Neha & Vishwa
Quit	none						Chaitu & Srija (Note: Chaitu & Srija decided to leave the show and didn't perform in danger zone.)			none			Sai & Seetha			none				Maanas & Shrasti

=== Detailed Score Pattern ===
Jodis Score + Judges Score = Total Score

Week	Episode	Judges Score (70 pts.)			Jodis Score (30 pts.)
Week	Episode	Sridevi	Sekhar	Sadha	Jodis Score (30 pts.)
2	3-4	20 pts.	30 pts.	20 pts.	10 pts. each pair
3	5-6	20pts.	20 pts.	30 pts.	10 pts. each pair
4	7	30 pts.	20pts.	20pts.	Pataka Jodis- 7.5 pts. each pair
4	8	30 pts.	20pts.	20pts.	Dhamaka Jodis - 10 pts. each pair
5	9	20pts.	30 pts.	20pts.	Pataka Jodis- 7.5 pts. each pair
5	10	20pts.	30 pts.	20pts.	Dhamaka Jodis - 10 pts. each pair
6	11	20pts.	20pts.	30 pts.	Pataka Jodis- 7.5 pts. each pair
6	12	20pts.	20pts.	30 pts.	Dhamaka Jodis - 10 pts. each pair
7	13	30 pts.	20pts.	20pts.	Pataka Jodis- 7.5 pts. each pair
7	14	30 pts.	20pts.	20pts.	Dhamaka Jodis - 10 pts. each pair
8	15-16	20 pts.	30 pts.	20 pts.	10 pts. each pair
9	17-18	20pts.	20 pts.	30 pts.	10 pts. each pair
Week	Episode	Judges Score (80 pts.)			Jodis Score (20 pts.)
10	19	30 pts.	25pts.	25pts.	Pataka Jodis- 10 pts. each pair
Week	Episode	Judges Score (70 pts.)			Jodis Score (30 pts.)
10	20	30 pts.	20 pts.	20 pts.	Dhamaka Jodis - 10 pts. each pair
Week	Episode	Judges Score (80 pts.)			Jodis Score (20 pts.)
11	21	25pts.	30 pts.	25pts.	Pataka Jodis- 10 pts. each pair
Week	Episode	Judges Score (70 pts.)			Jodis Score (30 pts.)
11	22	20pts.	30 pts.	20pts.	Dhamaka Jodis - 10 pts. each pair
12	23-24	20 pts.	20 pts.	30 pts.	6 pts. each pair
13	25-26	30 pts.	20 pts.	20 pts.	6 pts. each pair
Week	Episode	Judges Score (100 pts.)			Jodis Score (0 pts.)
Week	Episode	Sridevi	Sekha	Sadha	Jodis Score (0 pts.)
14	27-28	30pts.	40pts.	30pts.	None

=== Episodes ===
Week	Episode	Airing	Round	Guests
1	1	27 December 2025	Grand Launch	Saylim Chaudhari and M.M. Naidu to promote their new movie featuring Amardeep "Sumathi Sathakam"
1	2	28 December 2025	Grand Launch	Dimple Hayathi, Ashika Ranganath and Kishore Tirumala to promote their film "Bhartha Mahasayulaku Vignapthi"
2	3	3 January 2025	Best Foot Forward	-
2	4	4 January 2025	Best Foot Forward	Malavika Mohanan, Nidhhi Agerwal and Riddhi Kumar to promote their film "The RajaSaab"
3	5	10 January 2025	Celebration Theme	Gautham Krishna, Soldier Murali Naik's parents to promote a biopic on Murali Naik.
3	6	11 January 2025	Celebration Theme	Naveen Polishetty and Meenakshi Chaudhary to promote their film "Anaganaga Oka Raju"
4	7	17 January 2025	Blockbuster Theme	-
4	8	18 January 2025	Blockbuster Theme	Tharun Bhascker and Eesha Rebba to promote their film "Om Shanti Shanti Shantihi"; Dance Choreographers Revanth Master and Sunil
5	9	24 January 2025	"Dance of India"	-
5	10	25 January 2025	"Dance of India"	-
6	11	31 January 2025	"Judges Choice Round"	Comedian Emmanuel to entertain.
6	12	1 February 2025	"Judges Choice Round"	Amardeep Chowdary, Saylim Chaudhari, Tasty Teja, Mirchi Kiran and Kommalapati Sai Sudhakar to promote their film "Sumathi Sathakam"
7	13	7 February 2025	"Director's Special"	-
7	14	8 February 2025	"Director's Special"	Guest Judge: Anil Ravipudi
8	15	14 February 2025	"Connection Round"	Vishwak Sen, Kayadu Lohar and K. V. Anudeep to promote their film "Funky"
8	16	15 February 2025	"Connection Round"	Arjun Sarja, Aishwarya Arjun and Niranjan Sudhindra to promote their film "Seetha Payanam"
9	17	21 February 2025	"Superstars Special"	-
9	18	22 February 2025	"Superstars Special"	-
10	19	28 February 2025	"All Time Hits"	-
10	20	1 March 2025	"All Time Hits"	Varalaxmi Sarathkumar to promote her film "Saraswathi"
11	21	7 March 2025	"Theenmar Special"	Emmanuel, Kruthika and Ramu Rathod to support the pairs and dance with them.
11	22	8 March 2025	"Theenmar Special"	Adarsh, Kalyan Padala, Prince Yawar and Yashasvi to support the pairs and dance with them.
12	23	14 March 2025	"Mass Round"	Shrihan and Siri Hanmanth to promote their film "Panditha Putra"
12	24	15 March 2025	"Mass Round"	Harsh Roshan, Sridevi Apalla and Kona Venkat to promote their film "Band Melam"
13	25	21 March 2025	"Semi-Final"	-
13	26	22 March 2025	"Semi-Final"	-
14	27	28 March 2025	"Grand Finale"	Raashii Khanna to promote her film "Ustaad Bhagat Singh"
14	28	29 March 2025	"Grand Finale"	-

== Adaptations ==
Language	Title	Original release	Network(s)	Last aired	Notes
Tamil	BB Jodigal	2 May 2021	Star Vijay	4 September 2022	Original
Telugu	BB Jodi	25 December 2022	Star Maa	29 March 2026	Remake
