= Kalyanam Mudhal Kadhal Varai =

2014 Indian Tamil language TV series

- Genre: Drama; Family; Romance
- Based on: Custody by Manju Kapur
- Developed by: Ekta Kapoor
- Screenplay by: Priya Thampi
- Directed by: Thai Selvam
- Creative director: S. Ramana Girivasan
- Starring: Priya Bhavani Shankar; Amit Bhargav; Nivahsni Shyam; Chaitra Reddy
- Music by: Arun Prabhakar
- Country of origin: India
- Original language: Tamil
- No. of episodes: 583

Production
- Producers: Venkatesh Ramachandran, Sonali Sundararaj
- Cinematography: Ramesh Kumar
- Editor: Ram Manohar
- Camera setup: Multi-camera
- Running time: 22 minutes
- Production company: Global Villagers

Original release
- Network: Star Vijay
- Release: 3 November 2014 – 27 January 2017

Related
- Yeh Hai Mohabbatein

Kalyanam Mudhal Kadhal Varai (transl. From Marriage Till Love) is a 2014 Indian Tamil language soap opera that aired on Star Vijay. The show was launched on 3 November 2014 to 27 January 2017 for 583 episodes. This series was remake of Hindi series Yeh Hai Mohabbatein and stars Divyanka Tripathi Dahiya and Karan Patel portraying Dr. Ishita and Raman.

The show stars Priya Bhavani Shankar (who was later replaced by Chaitra Reddy) with Amit Bhargav in the lead roles, Whilst Nivahsni Shyam in the supporting role. The show was directed by Thai Selvam and has dialogues written by Marudhu Shankar. The music is composed by Arun Prabhakar. The show is completely based on the Hindi show Yeh Hai Mohabbatein, which is aired on Star Plus and is partly based on Manju Kapur's novel Custody and it concluded on 27 January 2017.

The pair was known as #Arjiya or #Arya on social networking sites. Unfortunately in the end of 2016, actress Priya quit the show due to her contract expiring and was replaced by newcomer actress Chaitra Reddy. Meanwhile, the ratings tanked and the show was abruptly cancelled. Set in Chennai, the show follows the love story of Priya, a Malayali and Arjun, a Tamilian who lives next door as they marry each other for Pooja, their relationship blossoms.

== Plot ==
Following a divorce from his unfaithful wife Vandhana (Vandana), after her affair with his boss Ashok, CEO Arjun Swaminathan is a bitter man, but he loves his daughter, Pooja. Dr. Priya Unnikrishnan, a dentist who lives next door, also loves Pooja. Unable to have children of her own, she has been unable to find a partner willing to marry an infertile woman. Vandhana and Ashok win custody of Aditya (called Adi), Arjun's elder son and also try to take custody of Pooja from Arjun. Priya and Arjun put aside their dislike of each other to marry to protect the little girl and ultimately win custody of the child. Ashok tries to take revenge, convincing Arjun that Pooja is not his daughter until Priya realizes what's going on and uses a DNA test to resolve Arjun's doubts.

== Cast ==
=== Main ===
- Priya Bhavani Shankar (2014-Oct.2016) as Dr. Priya Arjun: Manju and Unni's younger daughter, Arjun's second wife, Aditya and Pooja's stepmother
  - Chaitra Reddy (Nov. 2016 - Jan.2017) as Dr. Priya (Replacement of Priya Bhavani)
- Amit Bhargav as Mr. Arjun Swaminathan (2014-2017): Dhanalakshmi and Swaminathan's elder son, Dr. Priya's husband, Vandana's ex-husband, Ashok's ex-employee and his arch-rival; Aditya, and Pooja's father.
  - Amit also portrayed as Malli, a local gangster, Arjun's imposter in 2017.
- Nivashnee Shyam as Pooja Arjun: Daughter of Arjun and Vandhana, Priya's stepdaughter
- Anandh Ram as Aditya Arjun: Son of Arjun and Vandhana, Priya's stepson
- Vandana Michael as Vandana, Arjun's ex-wife, Ashok's ex-girlfriend, Pooja and Aditya's mother

=== Supporting ===
- Nathan Shyam as Ashok Kumar, Arjun's business rival, Vandhana's ex-boyfriend and Vaishali's husband
- Lokesh Baskaran as Jai: Arjun's best friend, Vandana's younger brother and Vaishali's ex-boyfriend, Kavya's ex-fiancée and Shruti's husband
- VJ Vaishali Vijay (2014-Oct.2015) → Vanitha Hariharan (2015-2017) as Vaishali Ashok Kumar: Vaidehi's daughter, Kavitha and Priya's cousin sister, Jai's ex-girlfriend and Ashok's wife
- Vishwam (2014-Aug.2016) → Madhu Mohan (2016-2017) as Unnikrishnan: Manju's husband, Kavitha and Priya's father, Vaishali's uncle
- Sadhana as Manjula Unnikrishnan: Unni's wife, Kavitha and Priya's mother, Vaishali's aunt
- Ravishankar as Swaminathan: Dhanalakshmi's husband, Sukanya, Arjun, Manoj and Shruti's father, Pooja, Aditya's grandpa
- Kuyili (2014–Apr.2016) as Dhanalakshmi Swaminathan "Dhanam": Swami's wife, Sukanya, Arjun, Manoj and Shruti's mother, Pooja, Aditya's grandma
  - Revathee Shankar (2016-2017) as Dhanam (Replacement of Kuyili)
- Manoj Kumar as Manoj Swaminathan: Dhanam and Swami's younger son, Arjun's younger brother and who was one-sidedly loved Vaishali.
- Syamantha Kiran as Sukanya Eshwar: Dhanam and Swami's elder daughter, Arjun's elder sister and Eshwar's wife, Ananya's mother
- Isvar Raghunath as Eshwar: Sukanya's husband and Ananya's father
- Kavitha as Kavitha Balakrishnan: Unni and Manju's elder daughter, Priya's elder sister and Bala's wife, Shravan's mother
- Kadhal Kannan as Balakrishnan: Kaveri's elder son, Subbu's older brother, Kavitha's husband and Shravan's father
- Myna Nandhini (2014-Aug.2015) → Rhema Ashok (2015-2017) as Shruti Jai: Dhanam and Swami's younger daughter, Arjun's younger sister and Jai's wife
- Karthik Sasidharan as Aravind Kumar, Ashok's younger brother.
- Badekkila Pradeep as Abijith "Biju": Priya's childhood friend
- Karthick Vasudevan as Karthik: Arjun's lawyer and his best friend, Kavya's boyfriend
- Anu Sulash (2014–May.16) → Haripriya Isai (2016–17) as Anuradha Manoj Kumar: Priya's clinic assistant
- Pavithra Janani as Kavya Karthick: Jai's ex-fiancée, Karthick's wife
- Siddharth Kumar as Subbu: Kaveri's younger son, Bala's younger brother and Priya's ex-fiancée
- Usha Elizabeth as Kaveri: Bala and Subbu's mother
- Priya Manjuathan as Ramya Joseph
- Anees Shaz as Subbu
- VJ Apsara as Ragini: Subbu's wife
- Rekha Suresh as Vaidehi: Manju's younger sister, Vaishali's mother
- Soodhu Kavvum Sivakumar as Shiva
- Sridevi Ashok (2017) as Swapna: Malli's wife

=== Guests ===
- Sivaranjani as Sivaranjani – Arjun's childhood friend (2016)

== Spin-off ==
Owing to its success cult for following years, Star Vijay made a decision to make a spin-off series and titled as Vikram Vedha (later known as Modhalum Kaadhalum). premiered on 24 April 2023, It focuses on Priya's niece Dr.Vedha, a pediatrician portrayed by Aswathy opposite Sameer portrayed as Vikram, a businessman.

== Adaptations ==
Language	Title	Original release	Network(s)	Last aired	Notes
Hindi	Yeh Hai Mohabbatein ये है मोहब्बतें	3 December 2013	StarPlus	19 December 2019	Original
Kannada	Avanu Mathe Shravani ಅವನು ಮತ್ತೆ ಶ್ರಾವಣಿ	16 June 2014	Star Suvarna	30 June 2017	Remake
Tamil	Kalyanam Mudhal Kadhal Varai கல்யாணம் முதல் காதல் வரை	3 November 2014	Star Vijay	27 January 2017	Remake
Bengali	Mon Niye Kachakachi মন নিয়ে কাছকাছি	12 January 2015	Star Jalsha	19 September 2015	Remake
Malayalam	Pranayam പ്രണയം	6 July 2015	Asianet	28 April 2017	Remake
Marathi	Nakalat Saare Ghadle नकळत सारे घडले	27 November 2017	Star Pravah	17 May 2019	Remake
Telugu	Ennenno Janmala Bandham ఎన్నెన్నో జన్మల బంధం	18 October 2021	Star Maa	1 September 2023	Remake
Tamil	Modhalum Kaadhalum மோதலும் காதலும்	24 April 2023	Star Vijay	21 June 2024	Remake
Marathi	Premachi Gosht प्रेमाची गोष्ट	4 September 2023	Star Pravah	5 July 2025	Remake
Malayalam	Ishtam Mathram ഇഷ്ടം മാത്രം	26 August 2024	Asianet	15 May 2026	Remake

== Awards and honours ==
Kalyanam Mudhal Kadhal Varai awards and nominations
Awards and nominations
Award	Wins	Nominations

Totals (Note: Certain award groups do not simply award one winner. They acknowledge several different recipients, have runners-up, and have third place. Since this is a specific recognition and is different from losing an award, runner-up mentions are considered wins in this award tally. For simplification and to avoid errors, each award in this list has been presumed to have had a prior nomination.)
- Wins: 15
- Nominations: 4

Year	Award	Category	Recipient	Role	Result
2015	Vijay Television Awards	Favourite Find	Amit Bhargav	Arjun	Won
2015	Vijay Television Awards	Favourite Find	Priya Bhavani Shankar	Priya	Won
2015	Vijay Television Awards	Favourite Supporting Actor Female	Kuyili	Dhanam	Won
2015	Vijay Television Awards	Favourite Actor Male	Amit Bhargav	Arjun	Nominated
2015	Vijay Television Awards	Favourite Actor Female	Priya Bhavani Shankar	Priya	Nominated
2015	Vijay Television Awards	Favourite Screen Pair	Amit Bhargav and Priya Bhavani Shankar	Arjun and Priya	Nominated
2015	Vijay Television Awards	Favourite Fiction Series	Kalyanam Mudhal Kadhal Varai – Series		Nominated
2015	Vijay Television Awards	Favourite Supporting Actor Male	Lokesh	Jai	Won
2015	Vijay Television Awards	Best Background Music	Kalyanam Mudhal Kadhal Varai		Nominated
2015	Vijay Television Awards	Best Child Actor	Nivashini	Pooja	Won
2017	Vijay Television Awards	Favourite Actor Male	Amit Bhargav	Arjun	Won
2017	Vijay Television Awards	Favourite Actress	Priya Bhavani Shankar	Priya	Nominated
2017	Vijay Television Awards	Favourite Mamiyar	Shari (Sadhana)	Manjula Unnikrishnan	Nominated
2017	Vijay Television Awards	Favourite Mother	Shari (Sadhana)	Manjula Unnikrishnan	Won
2017	Vijay Television Awards	Best Family	Kalyanam Mudhal Kadhal Varai		Won
2017	Vijay Television Awards	Best Child Actor	Nivashini	Pooja	Nominated
2017	Vijay Television Awards	Favourite Screen Pair	Amit Bhargav and Priya Bhavani Shankar	Arjun and Priya	Nominated
2017	Vijay Television Awards	Best Director	Thai Selvam		Won
2017	Vijay Television Awards	Favourite Fiction Series	Kalyanam Mudhal Kadhal Varai – Series		Won

== Notes ==
1. ^" Official Website". Retrieved 2016-07-21
2. ^"KMKV set to witness interesting twists -The Times of India". Retrieved 2016-07-21
3. ^"Vijay TV set to strengthen prime time band"- Indian Television. Retrieved 2016-07-21
4. ^"This recognition is very special:Amit Bhargav" – The Times of India. Retrieved 2016-07-21
