= Mon Niye Kachakachi =

2015 Indian Bengali language TV series

- Promotional poster
- Genre: Indian soap opera Drama; Romance; Comedy
- Created by: Shree Venkatesh Films
- Based on: Custody by Manju Kapur
- Developed by: Ekta Kapoor
- Starring: Tathagata Mukherjee; Basabdatta Chatterjee; Rimjhim Mitra Shirdhatri Sarkar
- Theme music composer: Indradeep Dasgupta
- Country of origin: India
- Original language: Bengali
- No. of episodes: 216

Production
- Production location: Kolkata
- Camera setup: Multi-camera
- Running time: 22 minutes
- Production company: Shree Venkatesh Films

Original release
- Network: Star Jalsha
- Release: 12 January – 19 September 2015

Related
- Yeh Hai Mohabbatein

Mon Niye Kachakachi is a Bengali language soap opera that premiered on Star Jalsha on 12 January 2015. The show was produced by Mahendra Soni and Shrikant Mohta under their production company Shree Venkatesh Films. It is the remake of the Hindi show Yeh Hai Mohabbatein, which stars Karan Patel and Divyanka Tripathi in the lead roles.

== Plot ==
The story revolves around Labanya Sanyal, a pediatric dentist by profession who is very loving and affectionate by nature. Her biggest pain in life is that she can't conceive a child. She makes up for that void by showering maternal love on all the children who come to her. She is a very optimistic and practical person. Labanya is neighbors with Ranveer, a successful businessman and a single father raising his daughter on his own. His ex-wife Shree left him for his boss and since then Ranveer has made it his mission in life to become very successful. He has also developed a cynical attitude towards women and relationships. In the process he has pushed away the most important person in his life, Muskaan his daughter. Through their encounters, Labanya comes really close to Muskaan and they develop a beautiful bond. Muskaan who misses a mother and feels neglected by her father gains a safe haven within the warm folds of Labanya's affection. Turn of events, then force Ranveer and Labanya to marry each other for Muskaan's sake. Their love for Muskaan forces them to come together into a relationship. Thus the 3 of them become a family and start the journey of knowing and caring for each other. Later on Muskaan's older brother Aditya (Shree and Ranveer's son) joins the family.

== Cast ==
=== Main ===
- Tathagata Mukherjee as Ranveer Kapoor, Labanya's husband, Aditya & Muskaan's father, Mona and Rajesh's elder son, Sree's ex-husband
- Basabdatta Chatterjee as Dr. Labanya Kapoor (née Sanyal), Ranveer's second wife, Joy's ex-girlfriend
- Shirdhartri Sarkar as Muskaan Kapoor, Shree & Ranveer's daughter, Aditya's younger sister, Labanya's step-daughter
- Rimjhim Mitra as Sreetama / Sree, Aditya and Muskaan's mother, Ranveer's ex-wife, Ashok's girlfriend

=== Recurring ===
- Sudip Mukherjee as Ashok Chatterjee, Shree's boyfriend, Ranveer;s rival
- Unknown as Aditya Kapoor- Ranveer and Shreetama's son, Muskaan's elder brother, Labanya's step-son
- Bharat Kaul as Rajesh Kapoor, Mona's husband, Ranveer, Gurpreet, Rocky & Jyoti's father
- Sudipa Bose as Mona Kapoor, Rajesh's wife, Ranveer, Gurpreet, Rocky & Jyoti's mother, Aditya & Muskaan's grandmother
- Maitreyee Mitra / Dolon Roy as Parama Sanyal, Labanya & Chitra's mother, Pratap's wife
- Chitra Sen as Labanya & Chitra's grandmother, Pratap's mother, Parama's mother-in-law
- Rohit Mukherjee as Pratap Sanyal, Labanya & Chitra's father, Parama's husband
- Anindya Chatterjee as Ayon Dutta, Chitra's husband
- Poulami Banerjee as Chitrangada "Chitra" Sanyal (also referred as Chutki), Labanya's younger sister, Ayon's wife, Rocky's crush
- Sushmita Dey as Bidisha Mukherjee, Raktim's wife, Labanya and Chitra's cousin
- Abhijit Deb Roy as Raktim Mukherjee, Bidisha's husband, Joy's older brother, Labanya and Chitra's cousin-in-law
- Manishankaar Banerjee as Raktim's father
- Unknown as Raktim & Joy's mother, Labanya's rival
- Unknown as Bidisha and Raktim's son
- Barna Raha as Gurpreet/Preeto, Ranveer's younger sister
- Aninda Pulak Banerjee as Kuljeet- Gurpreet's husband
- Debarshi Banerjee as Rocky Kapoor, Ranveer's younger brother
- Alivia Sarkar as Jyoti Kapoor, Ranveer's younger sister
- Dwaipayan Das as Koushik Roy Chowdhury, Labanya's ex-fiance
- Koushani Roy as Somdatta
- Upanita Banerjee as Dimpi, Preeto's friend
- Samantak Dyuti Moitra as Arko Chatterjee aka Dodo - Labanya's patient.

=== Guest appearances ===
- Hiran Chatterjee as himself came to promote his film Jamai 420
- Payel Sarkar as herself came to promote her film Jamai 420

== Adaptations ==
| Language | Title | Original release | Network(s) | Last aired | Notes |
|---|---|---|---|---|---|
| Hindi | Yeh Hai Mohabbatein ये है मोहब्बतें | 3 December 2013 | StarPlus | 19 December 2019 | Original |
| Kannada | Avanu Mathe Shravani ಅವನು ಮತ್ತೆ ಶ್ರಾವಣಿ | 16 June 2014 | Star Suvarna | 30 June 2017 | Remake |
| Tamil | Kalyanam Mudhal Kadhal Varai கல்யாணம் முதல் காதல் வரை | 3 November 2014 | Star Vijay | 27 January 2017 | Remake |
| Bengali | Mon Niye Kachakachi মন নিয়ে কাছকাছি | 12 January 2015 | Star Jalsha | 19 September 2015 | Remake |
| Malayalam | Pranayam പ്രണയം | 6 July 2015 | Asianet | 28 April 2017 | Remake |
| Marathi | Nakalat Saare Ghadle नकळत सारे घडले | 27 November 2017 | Star Pravah | 17 May 2019 | Remake |
| Telugu | Ennenno Janmala Bandham ఎన్నెన్నో జన్మల బంధం | 18 October 2021 | Star Maa | 1 September 2023 | Remake |
| Tamil | Modhalum Kaadhalum மோதலும் காதலும் | 24 April 2023 | Star Vijay | 21 June 2024 | Remake |
| Marathi | Premachi Gosht प्रेमाची गोष्ट | 4 September 2023 | Star Pravah | 5 July 2025 | Remake |
| Malayalam | Ishtam Mathram ഇഷ്ടം മാത്രം | 26 August 2024 | Asianet | 15 May 2026 | Remake |
