= Ennenno Janmala Bandham =

2021 Indian Telugu language TV series

- Genre: Romantic drama
- Based on: Custody by Manju Kapur
- Developed by: Ekta Kapoor
- Screenplay by: K Usha Rani
- Directed by: Suresh Palakurthi
- Starring: See below
- Composer: Sagar Bhujang
- Country of origin: India
- Original language: Telugu
- No. of episodes: 490

Production
- Producer: Kodali Swathi
- Production location: Hyderabad
- Editor: Harish Shankar
- Camera setup: Multi-camera
- Running time: 22 minutes

Original release
- Network: Star Maa
- Release: 18 October 2021 – 1 September 2023

Related
- Yeh Hai Mohabbatein

Ennenno Janmala Bandham (transl. A Bond of Many Births) is an Indian Telugu language romantic drama television series that aired on Star Maa from 18 October 2021 to 1 September 2023. It is an official remake of the Hindi-language television series Yeh Hai Mohabbatein. Produced by Kodali Swati, it stars Niranjan BS, Nainika in lead roles as Yashodhar, Vedhaswini and Khushi, respectively.

== Plot ==
The story revolves around Yashodhar "Yash" and his next-door neighbor Dr. Vedhaswini "Vedha", a pediatrician who adores children but faces infertility due to a medical condition. Yash and Vedha clash due to their inflated egos. Yash's troubled past has caused him to lose faith in love and relationships, while Vedha maintains an optimistic outlook on life. Yash and Vedha have contrasting personalities and struggle to find common ground on any issue. Both have strong beliefs and are hesitant to compromise easily. However, this unique combination of passionate and composed temperaments leads them to gradually fall in love as Yash's perception of the world transforms through Vedha, and Vedha starts to see the real Yash. Their paths converge through Yash's child from his ex-wife, Khushi.

== Summary ==
Dr. Vedhaswini, also known as Vedha, is a pediatrician who adores children but cannot conceive due to a medical issue. Her neighbor, Yashodhar "Yash" is a short-tempered businessman who has lost faith in love and relationships. Vedha rescues Khushi from an accident and they become friends. Vedha comforts Khushi when she becomes upset as Yash ignores her. Yash fumes with rage when he remembers his past with his ex-wife, Malavika, who cheated on him with his former boss, Abhimanyu. At the request of her family members, Vedha agrees to get married.

Vasanth and Chithra seek their families' approval. Unfortunately, both families reject their proposal. Vedha tries to persuade Yash to approve the marriage, but he declines. Meanwhile, Khushi gets locked up while searching for her mother at an award function. Vedha help Khushi to comes out. Yash misunderstands Vedha and yells at her because he is unaware of the situation. Vedha is deeply saddened after witnessing Khushi's deteriorating health and takes her to the hospital without informing Yash's family. Kanchana's words influence Yash, and he files a police complaint against Vedha. Unfortunately, things take a turn for the worse as Vedha's father gets arrested at the engagement. Vedha returns home to learn about this and sees Pratheek's true colors, leading her to break ties with him. With the help of Malavika, Vedha proves her innocence to the police. Yash worries about Khushi after learning the truth from the doctor and regrets misunderstanding Vedha. Meanwhile, Ratnam reprimands Malini for causing trouble for Vedha and her family.

Abhimanyu instigates Malavika to obtain custody of Khushi. There is pandemonium at Yash's home when Malavika presents legal documents to take Khushi with her. Pratheek becomes angry when Vedhaswini declines his marriage proposal. Yash makes efforts to gain custody of Khushi, but the court rules in Malavika's favor. Malini decides to find a caring mother for Khushi. Vedha becomes emotional after receiving a rejection letter from an orphanage. Yash becomes angry with Vedha for misunderstanding him. Later, Yash's family mistakenly believes Vedha is at Malavika's residence. Vedha suspects that Malavika is acting strangely and feels that Khushi is in danger. Vedha is overjoyed when Khushi visits her.

The court postpones the case after hearing Vedha's testimony. Meanwhile, Varadharaju and Ratnam decide to marry Vedhaswini and Yash for Khushi. Varadharaju becomes unhappy when Vedha expresses her unwillingness to get married, but later feels pleased when she agrees to meet the potential groom. At the resort, Vedha and Yash's families learn of this and reject the proposal. Ratnam and Varadharaju are disappointed when their plan fails. Yash faces a difficult situation when Vasanth invites Dhamodhar to the Sankranthi festival celebrations. At the event, Dhamodhar and his wife meet Yash's family. Later, Yash tries to convince Vedha, with Khushi's help, to pretend to be his wife. Eventually, Vedha, Yash, and Khushi celebrate the Sankranthi festival as a family with great joy.

Vedhaswini and Yash agree to get married for the sake of Khushi. They are surprised when both of their families approve of their wedding. Malavika becomes suspicious when Vedhaswini avoids talking about her fiancé, leading her to mistakenly believe that Vedha's fiancé is her brother-in-law. Yash and Vedha's engagement is celebrated by their families. Malini promises to treat Vedha like her own daughter, which makes Sulochana emotional. Yash reveals to Khushi that he is actually Vedha's fiancé, which makes her very happy. Khushi addresses Vedha as her mother which overwhelms her. Later, Malavika is shocked to learn that Yash is actually Vedha's fiancé and tries to stop the wedding by lying about Yash being a bad father to Adithya, their son. Vedha cancels the wedding when she finds out about Yash hiding the truth. However, it is revealed that Vedha's actions were just a pretense to make Malavika leave. Vedha and Yash eventually get married in front of Khushi, and their families are happy as they perform the post-wedding rituals.

Vedhaswini's unexpected appearance in court surprises Malavika and Abhimanyu. During the custody hearing, the judge questions Khushi about who should have custody of her, and Khushi ultimately decides to give custody to Malavika. Vedha wonders why Khushi chose Malavika instead of her. After reviewing testimony, the court gives the joint custody of Khushi to Vedha and Yash. The judge later condemns Abhimanyu for manipulating Khushi into choosing Malavika. Yash's family throws a grand party to celebrate Khushi's return home, and they tease Yash about his tiff with Vedha. Yash advises Vedha to steer clear of Malavika, whom he views as a threat.

Yash is shocked when Abhimanyu lies that Khushi is his daughter. Later on, Vedhaswini gets angry with Yash for his rude treatment towards Khushi. The following day, Yash apologizes to Khushi, feeling guilty. Vedha confronts Yash about his altered behavior towards Khushi and arranges for a DNA test after learning the truth about Abhimanyu's lie. Yash is happy after knowing with the DNA results, while Abhimanyu becomes angry when Yash warns him to mend his ways. Vedha decides to help Vasanth and Chithra, while Malavika becomes enraged when Abhimanyu refuses to marry her. Malavika becomes envious when Vedha and Yash share a beautiful moment together.

Yash attempts to persuade Vasanth to meet Damodhar's sister, Nidhi. Chithra and Vasanth become emotional about their breakup, and Vedha is pleased as Khushi surprises her on Mother's Day. Yash tries to impress Vedha by cooking for her, but he becomes angry when he loses an auction and is provoked by Abhimanyu. Yash becomes angry with Vedha for not supporting him and lashes out at her. Later, Vedha is hurt when the family confronts her. Abhimanyu becomes enraged when Yash mocks him about winning the fake auction. Yash apologizes to Vedha. Meanwhile, Nidhi discovers the truth about Vasanth and Chithra's relationship.

Nidhi doesn't approve of Vasanth and Chithra's relationship when they tell her about it. Kailash's true nature is exposed when he behaves inappropriately with Vedha. Vedha informs Malini and Kanchana about the same, but they don't believe her. Yash becomes suspicious of Vedha because she keeps Kailash's misbehavior hidden. Later, Vedha tells everyone about the incident but Kailash manipulates Yash's family with his sly tactics, causing Sulochana to criticize Malini for mistreating Vedha. Vedha goes to her parents' house, and Yash plans to leave Khushi at Varadharaju's house as she requests to see Vedha. Yash shares his plan with Vasanth to uncover the truth about Kailash. Yash exposes Kailash in front of his family and expels him from the house for disrespecting Vedha. Ratnam asks Vedha to return home, but she declines. Yash goes to Varadharaju's house with Malini to bring Vedha back. She comes back with Malini.

During the Bonalu celebrations, Malavika competes with Vedhaswini in performing a ritual. To get Kailash released from jail, Kanchana provokes Malini. On the other hand, Abhimanyu and Malavika meet with Kailash to seek revenge on Yash. Kanchana informs Kailash about her pregnancy and Abhimanyu manages to get Kailash released from jail. Meanwhile, Vedha confronts Yash about Kanchana's suicide attempt and warns Kailash to stay away from her. She slaps him when he misbehaves with her. Yash questions his decision regarding Vasanth's marriage to Nidhi. Vedhaswini decides to wear the saree gifted by Yash instead of Sulochana's saree. Later, Yash lashes out at Kailash for showing up at his house. Abhimanyu manipulates Adithya against Yash, and at Adithya's birthday party, Malavika insults Yash's family. Yash gets emotional when Adithya refuses to talk to him and is later disheartened when Adithya refuses his gift. Yash shares his feelings for Adithya with Vedha, becoming emotional.

== Cast ==
=== Main ===
- Deb as Dr. Vedhaswini Yash (née Panditaradhyula) aka Vedha: a pediatrician; Yash's second wife; Khushi's adoptive mother; Varadharaju and Sulochana's daughter; Chaitra's cousin; Ratnam and Malini's daughter-in-law
- Niranjan BS as Yashodhar "Yash": a CEO; Vedhaswini's husband; Adithya and Khushi's father; Ratnam and Malini's eldest son; Malavika's ex-husband; Varadharaju and Sulochana's son-in-law
- Nainika as Khushi: Yash and Malavika's biological daughter; Vedhaswini's adoptive daughter; Ratnam, Malini, Varadharaju, and Sulochana's granddaughter
  - Hayathi as Khushi (replaced Nainika)

=== Recurring ===
Yash's family

- Sridhar Jeedigunta as Ratnam: Malini's husband; Yash, Kanchana and Raj's father; Vedhaswini's father-in-law
- Padmavathi Majji as Malini Nair: Ratnam's wife; Yash, Kanchana and Raj's mother; Vedhaswini's mother-in-law
- Anitha as Kanchana: Yash's sister; Ratnam and Malini's daughter; Vedhaswini's sister-in-law
- Vaidyula Ram Kasyap as Raj: Ratnam and Malini's younger son; Yash and Kanchana's brother; Vedhaswini's brother-in-law
- Pranay Hanumandla as Vasanth: Yash's best friend
- Chidam Srinivas as Kailash; Kanchana's Husband
- Nirisha as Malini's maid
- Hemanth as Aditya; Yash & Malavika's son
- Heena Rai as Malavika: Yash's ex-wife; Adithya and Khushi's biological mom; Abhimanyu's ex-fiancé
- Viren Srinivas as Abhimanyu: Malavika's ex-fiancé; Yash's ex-boss

Vedha's family

- Tirupathi Dorai as Varadharaju: Sulochana's husband; Vedhaswini's father; Yash's father-in-law
- Sumitra Pampana as Sulochana: Varadharaju's wife; Vedhaswini's mother; Yash's mother-in-law
- Sri Lalitha as Vedhaswini's elder sister; Varadharaju and Sulochana's elder daughter; Yash's sister-in-law
- Ameet Zaveri as Shashidar: Vedhaswini's brother-in-law; Yash's co-brother-in-law; Varadharaju and Sulochana's son-in-law
- Swetha Reddy as Chithra: Vedhaswini's cousin; Yash's cousin-in-law; Varadharaju and Sulochana's niece

Others

- Hari Charan as Pratheek: Vedhaswini's former fiancé
- Niharika Harasu as Lalithamba: Vedhaswini's brother-in-law's and Manohar's mother
- Bahubali Niranjan as Inspector Vikram
- Nainisha as Akanksha
- Kaushik Ramapatali as Vinni
- Murali Mohan as Raja
- Rajyalakshmi as Rani
- Mahati as Bramarambhika; Abhimanyu's sister
- Priyanka as Neelambari; Abhimanyu's wife
- Prathibha Gowda as Nidhi
- Haricharan as Pratheek

=== Cameo appearances ===
- Mahesh Babu Kalidasu as Manohar: Vedhaswini's ex-fiancé; Lalithamba's younger son; Shashidar's younger brother
- Sanyu Davalagar as Aravind
- Sri Charan as Marriage broker
- Raja Sridhar as Dhamodhar: Yash client
- Geethasri as Dhamodhar's wife
- Karuna Bhushan as Lawyer
- Hritesh Awasty as Viabhav

== Production ==
=== Development ===
In 2021, Star Maa announced the remake of Yeh Hai Mohabbatein titled Ennenno Janmala Bandham which will be directed by Suresh Palakurthi.

=== Casting ===
My first TV show was actually in Tamil. I played a role in a show called Azhagu. It was this stint that opened doors for me in the Kannada television industry. However, irrespective of the language, I think it is important to be able to play characters that make an impact. I am excited to venture into a new industry with the new romantic serial Ennenno Janmala Bandham in which I play the role of a businessman called Yash. It's like a coming-of-age character for me as the character is very serious compared to what I have done in my previous outings. I am very excited to see how audiences accept me in the new industry.

— Niranjan BS

Niranjan BS, popularly known as Rishi from the Kannada TV show Kamali, was cast to play the main character Yash. Actress recognized for her roles as Rasaathi in and Sandhiya, was selected to portray the lead character Vedhaswini. Nainika was chosen to play the role of Khushi, while Heena Rai and Viren Srinivas were cast as the antagonists Malavika and Abhimanyu, respectively.

== Adaptations ==
Language	Title	Original release	Network(s)	Last aired	Notes
Hindi	Yeh Hai Mohabbatein ये है मोहब्बतें	3 December 2013	StarPlus	19 December 2019	Original
Kannada	Avanu Mathe Shravani ಅವನು ಮತ್ತೆ ಶ್ರಾವಣಿ	16 June 2014	Star Suvarna	30 June 2017	Remake
Tamil	Kalyanam Mudhal Kadhal Varai கல்யாணம் முதல் காதல் வரை	3 November 2014	Star Vijay	27 January 2017	Remake
Bengali	Mon Niye Kachakachi মন নিয়ে কাছকাছি	12 January 2015	Star Jalsha	19 September 2015	Remake
Malayalam	Pranayam പ്രണയം	6 July 2015	Asianet	28 April 2017	Remake
Marathi	Nakalat Saare Ghadle नकळत सारे घडले	27 November 2017	Star Pravah	17 May 2019	Remake
Telugu	Ennenno Janmala Bandham ఎన్నెన్నో జన్మల బంధం	18 October 2021	Star Maa	1 September 2023	Remake
Tamil	Modhalum Kaadhalum மோதலும் காதலும்	24 April 2023	Star Vijay	21 June 2024	Remake
Marathi	Premachi Gosht प्रेमाची गोष्ट	4 September 2023	Star Pravah	5 July 2025	Remake
Malayalam	Ishtam Mathram ഇഷ്ടം മാത്രം	26 August 2024	Asianet	15 May 2026	Remake
