= Nakalat Saare Ghadle =

2017 Indian Marathi language TV series

- Genre: Family drama
- Based on: Custody by Manju Kapur
- Developed by: Ekta Kapoor
- Starring: See below
- Theme music composer: Nilesh Moharir
- Opening theme: "Nakalat Saare Ghadle" by Mangesh Borgaonkar and Kirti Killedar
- Country of origin: India
- Original language: Marathi
- No. of episodes: 467

Production
- Producer: Swapnil Joshi
- Camera setup: Multi-camera
- Running time: 22 minutes

Original release
- Network: Star Pravah
- Release: 27 November 2017 – 17 May 2019

Related
- Yeh Hai Mohabbatein

Nakalat Saare Ghadle (transl. Everything Happened Unknowingly) is an Indian Marathi language romantic drama television series which aired on Star Pravah. It premiered from 27 November 2017 and ended on 17 May 2019. It stars Nupur Parulekar and Harish Dudhade in lead roles. It is an official remake of the Hindi TV series Yeh Hai Mohabbatein which was initially based on Manju Kapur's 2011 novel Custody.

== Plot ==
The plot of Nakalat Saare Ghadle revolves around two next-door neighbors with contrasting personalities: Prataprao "Pratap," an arrogant businessman, and Dr. Neha, a compassionate pediatrician yearning for motherhood. Their lives intertwine as their egos clash, taking them on a journey of self-discovery and love. Pratap, haunted by a troubled past, holds a pessimistic view of relationships, while Neha embraces the unpredictability of life. Their interactions are characterized by intense debates and constant disagreement as they struggle to find common ground. Both individuals possess strong convictions and are unwilling to compromise. However, fate steps in, creating an unexpected connection when their paths cross through Pari, Pratap's daughter from his ex-wife Maya.

== Summary ==
Dr Neha and CEO Prataprao; are neighbors who got off on the wrong foot and dislike each other, but are brought together by destiny and their mutual love for Pari, Pratap's daughter from his ex-wife Maya.

Following the betrayal of being left for a richer man, Pratap loses trust in relationships and love. Maya and Pratap's son, Aditya, is brainwashed by Dhaval who is the new man in Maya's life. This makes it difficult for Pratap to establish a relationship with Aditya. Pratap also finds it hard to connect with his daughter, Pari, who was only 6 months old when Maya left him.

Neha who loves children, but cannot conceive due to a medical issue develops a deep connection with Pari. Initially, Pratap and Neha hate each other due to several misunderstandings. However, they enter into a marriage of convenience for Pari's sake. Pratap marries Neha in order to get Pari's custody while Neha marries him to give Pari the motherly love she was deprived of.

== Cast ==
=== Main ===
- Nupur Parulekar as Neha Dixit / Neha Pratap Rangde-Patil
- Harish Dudhade as Pratap Rangde-Patil
- Sanvi Ratnalikar as Pari Pratap Rangde-Patil

=== Recurring ===
- Swapnali Patil as Maya
- Surekha Kudachi
- Anuradha Rajadhyaksha
- Umesh Damle
- Ashish Gade
- Supreet Kadam
- Sarika Banaraswale
- Prasad Limaye
- Hitarth Patil
- Mayur Pawar
- Sudesh Mhashilkar
- Astad Kale
- Meera Sarang

== Adaptations ==
Language	Title	Original release	Network(s)	Last aired	Notes
Hindi	Yeh Hai Mohabbatein ये है मोहब्बतें	3 December 2013	StarPlus	19 December 2019	Original
Kannada	Avanu Mathe Shravani ಅವನು ಮತ್ತೆ ಶ್ರಾವಣಿ	16 June 2014	Star Suvarna	30 June 2017	Remake
Tamil	Kalyanam Mudhal Kadhal Varai கல்யாணம் முதல் காதல் வரை	3 November 2014	Star Vijay	27 January 2017	Remake
Bengali	Mon Niye Kachakachi মন নিয়ে কাছকাছি	12 January 2015	Star Jalsha	19 September 2015	Remake
Malayalam	Pranayam പ്രണയം	6 July 2015	Asianet	28 April 2017	Remake
Marathi	Nakalat Saare Ghadle नकळत सारे घडले	27 November 2017	Star Pravah	17 May 2019	Remake
Telugu	Ennenno Janmala Bandham ఎన్నెన్నో జన్మల బంధం	18 October 2021	Star Maa	1 September 2023	Remake
Tamil	Modhalum Kaadhalum மோதலும் காதலும்	24 April 2023	Star Vijay	21 June 2024	Remake
Marathi	Premachi Gosht प्रेमाची गोष्ट	4 September 2023	Star Pravah	5 July 2025	Remake
Malayalam	Ishtam Mathram ഇഷ്ടം മാത്രം	26 August 2024	Asianet	15 May 2026	Remake
