= Sabumon Abdusamad =

Indian actor and television presenter

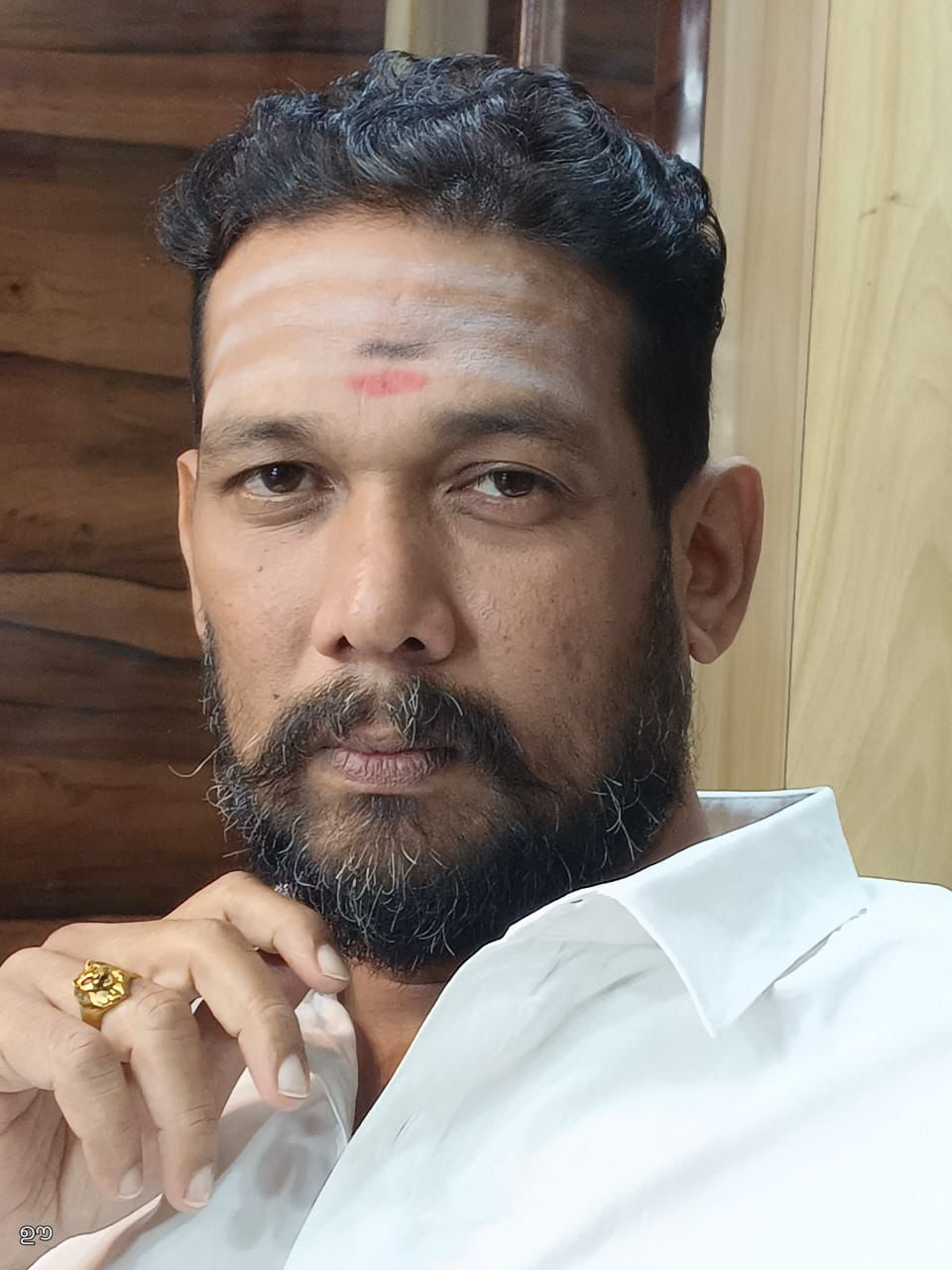
- Born: Sabumon Abdusamad; Kayamkulam, Kerala, India
- Education: University College, Thiruvananthapuram
- Occupations: Actor; Television presenter
- Years active: 2000–present

Sabumon Abdusamad, also known mononymously as Sabumon and Sabu, is an Indian actor and television presenter who works in Malayalam cinema. He was the winner of the first season of Malayalam Bigg Boss.

== Education and early career ==
Sabu hails from Kayamkulam, Alappuzha. He holds three graduate degrees, in Malayalam, Journalism and in Law respectively from University College, Thiruvananthapuram. He initially worked in the sales and operations division of Lufthansa Airlines in Saudi Arabia. Later, he quit the job to pursue acting.

== Personal life ==
He is married to Sneha Bhaskaran .

== Career ==
Sabu initially achieved success through the TV show Tharikida, which focused on pranks on unsuspecting people. Due to the success of the show, people started addressing him as Tharikida Sabu. Sabu continued to do television shows, and his role as an interviewer in the TV show Midukki was widely appreciated.

Sabu was the thirteenth contestant in Bigg Boss, a show hosted by Malayalam actor Mohanlal. He lasted the entire duration of the 98-day show and went on to win the title, beating competition from Pearle Maaney, Shiyas Kareem, Srinish Aravind and Aristo Suresh in the grand finale in 2018. As winner, he was also offered a major role in the Lijo Jose Pellissery directed film Jallikattu, which became India's official entry to the Oscars for 2020.

Sabu owns a production company, SAB Productions.

In 2021, he was a panelist in the Mazhavil Manorama television channel comedy reality show Oru Chiri Iru Chiri Bumper Chiri, and followed it up in its second season in 2023.

In 2024, he made his Tamil film debut, as villain in the Rajinikanth-starrer Vettaiyan. He was cast after director T. J. Gnanavel saw his performance in Jallikattu.

== Television ==
| Year | Program | Channel | Role |
|---|---|---|---|
| 2000 | Tharikida | Surya TV | Host |
| 2005 | Attahasam | Asianet Plus | Host |
| 2013 | Midukki | Mazhavil Manorama | Guest judge |
| 2014 | Take It Easy | Mazhavil Manorama | Host |
| 2016 | Just Fun Chumma | Amrita TV | Host |
| 2018 | Bigg Boss (Malayalam season 1) | Asianet | Winner |
| 2018 | Sell Me The Answer | Asianet | Guest contestant |
| 2018 | Comedy Stars | Asianet | Guest |
| 2021–2023 | Oru Chiri Iru Chiri Bumper Chiri | Mazhavil Manorama | Judge |
| 2021–2022 | Bumper Chiri Aaghosham | Mazhavil Manorama | Judge |
| 2023 | The Next Top Anchor | Mazhavil Manorama | Judge |
| 2024 | The Adventure | Flowers TV | Host |
| 2024 | Bigg Boss (Malayalam season 6) | Asianet | Guest |
| 2024-2025 | Enkile Ennodu Para | Asianet | Host |
| 2025 | Bigg Boss (Malayalam season 7) | Asianet | Guest |
| 2026 | Comedy Cooks | Asianet | Runner-up |

== Filmography ==
- Note: All films are in Malayalam unless specified otherwise noted.

Key
| † | Denotes films that have not yet been released |

| Year | Title | ! Role | Notes |
|---|---|---|---|
| 2002 | Nakshathrakkannulla Rajakumaran Avanundoru Rajakumari | Bhaskaran | |
| 2005 | Kadha | Raghu | |
| 2013 | Punyalan Agarbattis | Idivettu Sabu | |
| 2015 | Karma Cartel | Luttu | |
| 2015 | Adi Kapyare Kootamani | Veluchammi | |
| 2015 | Acha Dhin | Michael | |
| 2015 | Double Barrel | Podiyadi Martin | |
| 2015 | Fireman | Binoy | |
| 2016 | Darvinte Parinamam | Jackson | |
| 2016 | Oru Murai Vanthu Parthaya | Sukumaran | |
| 2017 | Godzone | Gounder | |
| 2019 | Janamaithri | Police Constable Ashraf | |
| 2019 | Jallikkattu | Kuttachan | |
| 2019 | Thrissur Pooram | Shyam Rangan | |
| 2020 | Dhamaka | Britto | |
| 2020 | Ayyappanum Koshiyum | Kuttamani | |
| 2021 | Ajagajantharam | Kachamber Das | |
| 2022 | Upacharapoorvam Gunda Jayan | Sahadevan | |
| 2022 | Member Rameshan 9aam Ward | Ajithan Vettukuzhi | |
| 2022 | Adithattu | | |
| 2022 | Gold | Usman's friend | |
| 2023 | Djinn | Paul Kattukaran | |
| 2023 | Iratta | SCPO Sandeep | |
| 2023 | Neelavelicham | | |
| 2023 | Praavu | Kamalasanan | |
| 2023 | Sesham Mike-il Fathima | Jayesh Nair | |
| 2024 | Njan Kandatha Sare | | |
| 2024 | Her | Jagannathan | |
| 2024 | Vettaiyan | Kumaresan | Tamil film |
| 2025 | Kingston | Thomas | Tamil film |
| 2026 | Ananthan Kaadu | | Malayalam- Tamil bilingual |
| 2026 | Unmadham | | |
| 2026 | Law and Order | | |
| 2026 | Avaraachan & Sons | Father Cletus | |
| 2026 | Anbil Avan | Lawyer Martin | Tamil film |
| TBA | Non Violence † | | Tamil film |
