= Srinish Aravind =

Indian television actor (born 1985)

- Born: 2 June 1985 (age 41); Palakkad
- Education: Guru Nanak College Chennai
- Occupation: Actor
- Years active: 2014–present
- Spouse: Pearle Maaney (m. 2019)
- Children: 2 (Nila and Nitara)

Srinish Aravind (born 2 June 1985) is an Indian television actor and model, who works in Tamil and Malayalam films and television series also few Telugu TV serials. He was one of the five finalists in the reality show Bigg Boss Malayalam season 1.

== Career ==
Srinish attained public recognition after acting in the mega serial Pranayam on Asianet, in the role of Sharan G. Menon. It was directed by Sudheesh Shankar and produced by Merryland Murugan. It was a remake of the Hindi serial Ye Hai Mohabbatein telecast on Star TV, based on the novel Custody by Manju Kapur. In Pranayam, his character Saran G Menon was the male lead, the CEO of a multinational company. In 2017, he made his Tamil television debut with the long-running serial Vamsam (TV series) playing a negative role called Raj alongside actress Ramya Krishnan. On 28 April Pranayam ended completing 524 episodes, from the next week he signed into play the lead role in another Malayalam serial Ammuvinte Amma. He did a short stint in a Telugu serial Natachirami in Gemini TV and in Niram Maaratha Pookkal (TV series) in Zee Tamil before entering into Bigg Boss (Malayalam season 1).

In 2018, he contested in the first season of the reality TV show Bigg Boss on Asianet and emerged as the third runner-up of the show completing 100 days.

== Personal life ==
During the season one of Malayalam Bigg Boss reality show in 2018, Srinish developed a romantic relationship with co-contestant Pearle Maaney and both of them expressed their wish to get married. On 17 January 2019, Srinish got engaged to Pearle at a private ceremony. They got married twice. The first one was on 5 May 2019 at a church in Aluva by Christian rituals and the next by Hindu rituals on 8 May 2019 in Palakkad. They have two daughters, Nila and Nitara, born on March 20, 2021, and 13 January 2024

== Filmography ==
=== Films ===
- All films are in Tamil, Otherwise noted.

Year	Film	Role	Notes
2016	Kuttrame Thandanai	Arun	
2016	Kanithan	Unknown	
2017	Vaigai Express	Prakash	
2025	Detective Ujjwalan	Gowtham	Cameo appearance

=== Television ===
Year	Program	Channel	Role	language	Notes
2015–2017	Pranayam	Asianet	Sharan G. Menon	Malayalam	Debut Serial
2015–2017	Vamsam	Sun TV	Raj	Tamil	Supporting Role
2017 – 2018	Ammuvinte Amma	Mazhavil Manorama	Manoj	Malayalam	
2018	Bigg Boss (Malayalam season 1)	Asianet	Contestant	Malayalam	Reality show
2019–2021	Sathya Enna Penkutty	Zee Keralam	Sudheep Chandran	Malayalam	
2020	Funny Nights with Pearle Maaney	Zee Keralam	Himself	Malayalam	Guest
2020	Chembarathi	Zee Keralam	Sudhi	Malayalam	Guest appearance
2021	Poove Unakkaga	Sun TV	Karthick Subramanian	Tamil	Main lead role
