= Bigg Boss (Malayalam TV series) season 1 =

First season of the Malayalam reality TV series Bigg Boss

Bigg Boss
- Season 1
- Presented by: Mohanlal
- No. of days: 98
- No. of housemates: 18
- Winner: Sabumon Abdusamad
- Runner-up: Pearle Maaney
- No. of episodes: 99

Release
- Original network: Asianet
- Original release: 24 June – 30 September 2018

Series chronology
- Next → Season 2

The first season of the Malayalam-language version of the Indian reality television series Bigg Boss was telecast on Asianet from 24 June 2018 to 30 September 2018, lasting 99 episodes. It was produced by Endemol Shine India and actor Mohanlal was the host of the show. The show follows a total of 18 contestants, who are isolated from the outside world for 98 days (or 14 weeks) in a custom built house. Each week, one or more of the housemates are evicted by a public vote.

For the first season, a splendid home was set up in Film City, Mumbai. The winner was awarded a prize worth ₹1 crore (US$100,000). The show was aired on Asianet channel and is also available on VOD and OTT platform Hotstar. Some new elements called 'Unseen', 'Spicy specials' and 'Bigg Boss Plus' was introduced by way of unseen and extra footage uploaded on Hotstar. Bigg Boss Plus was aired on Asianet Plus and shows part of the day that wasn't included in the episode, from 'wake-up call' to 'lights out'.

The show aired its grand finale on 30 September 2018, declaring Sabumon Abdusamad as the winner of the first season, while Pearle Maaney was the runner-up. The other finalists were Shiyas Kareem, Srinish Aravind, and V. Suresh Thampanoor (in finishing order).

== Housemates status ==
Housemate	Day entered	Day exited	Status
Sabu	Day 0	Day 98	Winner
Pearle	Day 0	Day 98	1st runner-up
Shiyas	Day 15	Day 98	2nd runner-up
Srinish	Day 0	Day 98	3rd runner-up
Suresh	Day 0	Day 98	4th runner-up
Aditi	Day 0	Day 95	Evicted
Archana	Day 0	Day 91	Evicted
Basheer	Day 0	Day 84	Evicted
Hima	Day 0	Day 21	Evicted
Hima	Day 49	Day 77	Re-evicted
Anoop	Day 0	Day 70	Evicted
Ranjini	Day 0	Day 63	Evicted
Anjali	Day 35	Day 43	Walked
Diya	Day 0	Day 42	Evicted
Shweta	Day 0	Day 35	Evicted
Deepan	Day 0	Day 28	Evicted
Sreelakshmi	Day 0	Day 27	Evicted
David	Day 0	Day 7	Evicted
Manoj	Day 0	Day 4	Walked

== Housemates ==
The participants in the order of appearance and entrance in the house are:

=== Original entrants ===
- Shweta Menon, Film Actress
- Deepan Murali, TV Actor
- Sreelakshmi Sreekumar, Film Actress
- Srinish Aravind, TV Actor
- Hima Shankar, Film Actress
- Aristo Suresh, Singer, Film Actor
- Diya Sana, Social Activist
- Anoop Chandran, Film Actor
- Aditi Rai, Film Actress
- Basheer Bashi, Internet Celebrity
- Manoj K. Verma, Businessman
- Pearle Maaney, TV Host
- David John, Model
- Sabumon Abdusamad, Film Actor
- Archana Suseelan, TV Actress
- Ranjini Haridas, TV Host

=== Wildcard entrants ===
- Shiyas Kareem, Model
- Anjali Ameer, Film actress

== Guests ==
Week(s)	Day(s)	Guest(s)	Purpose of visit
7	Day 48	Kamal Haasan	To promote their film Vishwaroopam II.
8	Day 52	Mukesh	To be a part of the luxury budget task.
9	Day 62	Mohanlal	To celebrate Onam with the housemates.
14	Day 97	All evicted/walked housemates except Sreelakshmi Sreekumar and Swetha Menon	To spend time with the finalists and wish them luck.
14	Day 98	Stephen Devassy	To perform for the contestants.
14	Day 98	Mohanlal	To invite the finalists to the stage and switch off the Bigg Boss House.

== Weekly summary ==
The main events in the house are summarized in the table below. A typical week begins with nominations, followed by the luxury budget task, punishment then a task for immunity or anything else, and then the eviction of a housemate on Sunday or Saturday. Evictions, tasks, and other notable events for a particular week are noted in order of sequence.

Week 1	Entrances	On Day 0, Aditi Rai, Anoop Chandran, Archana Suseelan, Aristo Suresh, Basheer Bashi, David John, Deepan Murali, Diya Sana, Hima Shankar, Manoj K Verma, Pearle Maaney, Ranjini Haridas, Sabumon Abdusamad, Shweta Menon, Sreelakshmi Sreekumar and Srinish Aravind entered the house.
Week 1	Daily Tasks	Manakkannu: On Day 1, Each housemate were asked to give their first impression on their co-contestants about the one who doesn't deserve to be an alone participant of the show.; Aditi was the one with most votes.; Aadya Pranayam: On Day 2, Each housemate were asked to talk about their first love.; Ente Jeevitham: On Day 3, The housemates were asked to talk about a situation whether it's good or bad which made a huge impact/difference in their life.; Musical Chair: On Day 5, The housemates were given a musical chair task. A song is played and a balloon is passed to every contestant and when the song stops, whoever holding the balloon will need to take a note (a sub-task wrote) and make any other housemates to do it. The one who remains until the end will win the task.; Hima won the task.
Week 1	Captaincy Task	On Day 1, The housemates were asked to elect the first house captain by voting a contestant based on their personal opinions. As Aditi was voted the highest on the previous task (Manakkannu), she cannot be a part of this task and hence can't be the house captain for the first week.
Week 1	Result	Won - Shwetha
Week 1	Nomination	Bigg Boss announced the rules and each housemate were called in the confession room for the nomination. Each housemate had to nominate 2 people. Aditi, David, Diya, Hima and Srinish were nominated for the elimination.; As the house caption, Shweta was given a special power to nominate a housemate except those who nominated by the normal nomination procedure. She chose Suresh to be nominated.
Week 1	Luxury Budget Task	On Day 2, The contestants were given their first Luxury budget task in which the housemates were required to dance on a moving flapped wheel by the time when the given song is played for each contestant.; Twenty-Twenty: On day 3, The housemates were divided into two, as Mammootty fans and Mohanlal fans. They dressed up as the actors. They also had to dance to the songs of these actors.
Week 1	Exits	Walked: On Day 4, Manoj left the Bigg Boss house due to his poor health conditions.; Evicted: On Day 7, David became the first housemate to evict from the house after facing the public vote.
Week 2	Captaincy Task	On Day 5, Swetha was asked to choose two deserving candidates among the non-nominated housemates to be the part of next (Week 2) captaincy task. She chose Archana and Ranjini.; Dwandha Yudham: The two candidates were given 13 number cards to distribute to the housemates according to the order of their popularity. Also, the contestants should remember about the order chosen by their opponents.
Week 2	Result	Won - Ranjini
Week 2	Nomination	The house captain was asked to nominate 7 out of all the contestants to be in the nomination list in which the co-housemates could select two for this week's nomination. Captain chose Anoop, Hima, Deepan, Diya, Pearle, Srinish, Suresh.; Anoop, Deepan, Hima, Pearle and Suresh were nominated for elimination.
Week 2	Luxury Budget Task	On Day 9, The housemates were required to make chains/bangles. Sabumon and Ranjini were essayed to be the owners and has money of total 1 lakh each which is needed to distribute to the other housemates on their demand to work with them. In the end, the one who has more money will be the winner and will be a candidate for the next (week 3) captaincy task.; On Day 9, Bigg Boss ordered for 75 chains. The housemates failed to reach the target. On Day 10, the second day of the task, an order of 85 chains was given and the housemates again failed to reach the target number again.; The housemates failed the task.; Anoop had more money and hence became a candidate for the house captain.; On Day 11, The owners (Ranjini and Sabu) were asked to choose one candidate from each of their team to stand as candidates for house captain. They chose Srinish and Shweta; Secret Task: On Day 10, a secret task was given to Diya. She was required to make the housemates fail to complete the second order unless she will be directly nominated for the eviction. If successful, she will be a candidate for the house captain for the third week.; Diya failed the secret task.; Luxury Goal: On Day 11, a final chance to gain the luxury budget was given. Only those housemates who won the daily task (Rasakkoottu) could take part in this task. Different footballs will be set up with a luxury food name on it. The contestants need to shoot a perfect goal with eyes closed in order to obtain that particular luxury food.; The housemates obtained three luxury food.
Week 2	Task	Mookhabhinayam: The housemates were asked to show off their acting skills through mime and were divided to two groups. Ranjini and Shweta were assigned as judges.; Team A: Anoop, Archana, Basheer, Deepan, Sreelakhsmi, Srinish Team B: Aditi, Diya, Hima, Pearle, Sabumon, Suresh
Week 2	Result	Won - Team B
Week 2	Daily Task	Rasakkoottu: On Day 11, The housemates divided into two groups and were asked to make a dessert with the items given within 15 minutes. The house captain will declare the winning team based on the taste of the foods made.; Team Shweta: Aditi, Anoop, Sabumon, Deepan, Sreelakhsmi, Suresh Team Archana: Basheer, Diya, Hima, Pearle, Ranjini
Week 2	Result	Won - Team Archana
Week 2	Secret Task	A secret task to fool Diya was given to Sabumon.; With the help of other housemates, he became successful in the task.
Week 3	Captaincy Task	The candidates (Anoop, Shweta and Srinish) will be connected in a rope with three hooks attached to each candidate. The one who stays with the rope without detaching the hook will be the house captain.; Anoop unhooked himself and walked off from the task.
Week 3	Result	Won - Srinish
Week 3	Nomination	Each housemate had to nominate 2 person. Anoop, Hima, Ranjini, and Sabumon were nominated. Later, the house captain saved Ranjini and replaced Sreelakshmi to be nominated with his special power.
Week 3	Entrances	On Day 15, Shiyas Kareem entered the house as a wild card contestant.
Week 3	Daily Tasks	Sanga Nritham: On Day 15, All the housemates were asked to dance on Bigg Boss's theme song.; Nyaaya Vidhi: On Day 18, Housemates were given a card in which they were required to mention a complaint about a particular co-housemate. A court was made from where the housemates can speak their opinions. Anoop was assigned as the judge of the court. Punishments are given if one found to be wrong proving him/herself.
Week 3	Weekly Task	On Day 16, Ranjini was assigned as a serial killer whom needed to kill particular housemates secretively by the way and time Bigg Boss orders through a secret mobile phone. Shiyas was told to help Ranjini secretively in her missions.; On Day 17, second day of the task, Sabu and Shweta were assigned the duty of police whom are needed to investigate the murders happening around the house. Later, Shweta was killed. Sabu identified that the murders were done by Shiyas and Ranjini by his tricky questions. He was given promotion by Bigg Boss as CID Sabu. Later, the housemates won the luxury budget task.
Week 3	Exit	On Day 21, Hima evicted from the show after facing the public vote.
Week 4	Captaincy Task	Housemates chose Basheer, Ranjini and Sabumon for captaincy. Each candidates has to sit inside a small box in which only their head can be seen out with knees bend. The one who stands appropriated for the longest time will be the House captain.
Week 4	Result	Won - Ranjini
Week 4	Nomination	Housemates mutually decided Aditi, Deepan, Pearle, Sreelakshmi, Shiyas and Srinish to be in the nomination list. Later, each housemates chose two among these six housemates to be nominated. Finally, Aditi, Deepan, Sreelakshmi and Srinish got nominated for eviction.
Week 4	Luxury Budget Task	On Day 23, Housemates were required to bypass 7 tasks to win the luxury budget. The 7 tasks were, Chithram Vichithram (failed), Minnunnathellaam Ponnalla (won), Haylessah (failed), Bharghavi Nilayam (failed), Task 4 (won). On Day 24, second day of the task, two task were given, KKPP (won), Teeta Rappayi (won). On Day 25, third day of the task, the seventh and the final task to achieve luxury budget was given, Aadambhara Yathra (won).; Housemates credited the luxury of 1625 rupees.
Week 4	Daily Task	Sundari Neeyum Sundaran Njanum: On Day 24, Housemates had to perform a comedy skit with a 'Pennu Kaanal' theme. Each housemates were given certain characters to play off their roles.
Week 4	Other Task	Vijaarana: On Day 25, A court was made and Sabumon was assigned as its judge. Housemates had to mention their complaints.; Mounam Udaaryam: On Day 26, A bowl with several food names written in paper slots was given to the housemates. They divided into two groups and required to read the slot and make it known to other housemates with actions or symbols only. If become successful, that particular food will be given to the housemates.
Week 4	Exit	On Day 27, Sreelakshmi evicted from the show after facing the public vote.; On Day 28, Deepan evicted from the show after facing the public vote. This was the first time that two housemates were evicted from the show on the same week.
Week 5	Captaincy Task	On Day 26, Housemates chose Aditi, Archana and Pearle for captaincy. Candidates were required to fill their baskets with red-star punched balls within a minute among thousand balls. The one who fills the most balls will be the winner.; At first, Aditi took 6, Archana and Pearle took 7 balls each. Hence, a second round conducted among Archana and Pearle from which Archana took 8 and Pearle took 9 balls.
Week 5	Result	Won - Pearle
Week 5	Luxury Budget Task	Amma Malayalam: On Day 30, A school was made to teach the housemates the importance of Malayalam language. Anoop, Diya and Suresh were assigned as Malayalam teacher, Head of the Department and Music teacher respectively and else all housemates students.; On Day 31, second day of the task, Housemates were asked to choose the best performer of the luxury budget task. They chose Anoop and became a candidate for captaincy.
Week 5	Nomination	Housemates were assembled in the activity area. They individually asked to paint the face and shared opinion about their nominations. Ranjini and Shweta were nominated for eviction with seven and ten votes respectively.
Week 5	Other Task	Thattukada: Housemates had to cover a cookery show. Ranjini is the host of the show. Sabumon, Suresh and Basheer were assigned as the cook, the owner and the helper respectively and else all the viewers.
Week 5	Exit	On Day 35, Shweta evicted from the show after facing the public vote.
Week 6	Captaincy Task	On Day 32, Anoop and Sabumon were asked to choose two among all the housemates to be with them for the captaincy task. They chose Diya and Suresh. Only one among these two will be eligible for the captaincy task.; Panja Gusthi: Diya and Suresh had to win an arm wrestling competition in order to be a candidate for captaincy. They were allowed to choose two among all the housemates to compete on behalf of them. Diya chose Shiyas and Suresh chose Srinish. Shiyas won the competition and hence Diya became the third candidate for the captaincy task.; Bicycle Race: On Day 33, The three candidate that been elected had an activity to participate. The activity was to ride a bicycle, the winner will be the one who manages to ride for a longer duration. And for a twist, each bicycle had a picture of the candidates in front of them covered. Diya won the activity but the picture in front of the bicycle was of Sabumon, hence Sabumon won the competition.; Pakal vs Iruttu: On Day 34, housemates voted against each contestant as who feel Raavu and Pakal, according to the vote Suresh selected as Pakal and Diya selected as Raavu. Suresh and Diya selected as captain of Pakal and Raavu accordingly and ask them to prepare their team to play the game Piramid
Week 6	Result	Won - Sabumon
Week 6	Entrances	On Day 35, Anjali Ameer entered the house as a wild card contestant.
Week 6	Nomination	Housemates divided into two groups and each had to nominate two among the opposite group. Archana, Diya and Pearle were nominated with normal voting procedures. As a house captain, Sabumon was given special power to nominate two other housemates. He chose Basheer and Srinish and were nominated for eviction.
Week 6	Luxury Budget Task	Shaktiman: On Day 37, Housemates had to wear a bag with some weights (dumbbells with 10 kg, total 86 kg) and had to stand wearing it till the last buzzer. Each weights contains several points for luxury. If one continues to stay with put-ons's for two buzzer simultaneously, he/she will be able to be a candidate for captaincy and will be credited a bonus of 200 points.; Basheer continued for first the two rounds and became a candidate for captaincy. Later, Archana and Srinish completed third and fourth rounds.
Week 6	Other Tasks	Bigg Boss Awards: On Day 37, All the housemates were asked to dress up for the award night and Pearle was chosen as the host of the show. Sabumon won most awards.; Adimakkannu: On Day 40, The nominees for eviction this week (Srinish, Pearle, Basheer, Archana and Diya) were asked to pick a slave each and were given full powers to make their slaves do anything for them.
Week 6	Daily Task	Bogg Boss Brother's Kadha Prasangam: On Day 38, Anoop and Suresh were ordered to plan a lyrical narration of a particular incident in the house.
Week 6	Promotional Task	Fogg Sugandhangal: On Day 38, The game was to identify the name of the deodorant by its fragrance. Housemates were divided into two groups and one from each group could smell the deodorant and narrate its fragrance through a poetic explanation.; Team Pearle: Aditi, Anjali, Diya, Ranjini, Suresh Team Sabumon: Anoop, Archana, Basheer, Shiyas, Srinish
Week 6	Result	Won - Team Pearle
Week 6	Exit	On Day 42, Diya Sana evicted from the house after facing the public vote.
Week 7	Captaincy Task	Bigg Boss Karannavar: On Day 40, The housemates were ordered to vote for the one whom they think is deserving enough to be the 'Karanavar'.; Everyone delivered good speeches and Archana was voted as the new 'Karanavar' of the house.
Week 7	Nomination	Bigg Boss announced the nomination process and invited two people to the confession room and. The housemates had to mutually decide the one between them to be nominated for eviction.; Anoop, Pearle, Sabumon and Suresh were nominated for eviction.; Since Aditi and Anjali could not end up in a decision, Archana as a house captain was given a special power to nominate one among them. She chose Aditi to be nominated.
Week 7	Luxury Budget Task	Chakravyuham: On Day 44, In the puzzle round, housemates were asked to find the hidden luxury point in the paint buckets placed in the game zone. Each player had to keep in mind the direction to the treasure given by Bigg Boss and play accordingly. Basheer was chosen as the secret messenger by Bigg Boss and he was given the task to spoil the housemates’ luxury task.; Anjali Ameer was taken to the hospital after becoming ill.
Week 7	Daily Task	Kadhayile Thaaram: On Day 44, Each housemate was asked to tell a story with the given plot. Everyone displayed their creativity and Ranjini was chosen as the winner of the task.; Ennile Njan: On Day 46, the housemates were asked to choose a color with a hidden topic and talk on it.
Week 7	Exit	Walked: On Day 45, Anjali Ameer left the show due to her poor health conditions.
Week 8	Captaincy Task	On Day 46, Bigg Boss announced to select the captain nominees for the week eight and housemates selected Anoop, Shiyas, and Aditi for the captaincy task.; On Day 47, The candidates were asked to take part in this task. The primary task is to eat 12 pieces of Puttu (A Kerala dish made up of rice flour) and 12 bananas in a fixed time.
Week 8	Result	Won - Shiyas
Week 8	Entrances	On Day 49, ex-contestant Hima Shankar enters the house as wildcard.
Week 8	Nomination	On Day 50, housemates were asked to nominate two contestants for eviction. Pearle, Ranjini, Srinish and Suresh were nominated and later captain was given special power to nominate one among the non-nominated housemates. Shiyas nominated Archana for the eviction.
Week 8	Luxury Budget Task	Bigg Boss Bahirakasha Kendram: On Day 52, Bigg Boss house was turned into a space research center and all the housemates were researchers who should protect the dead body of 'Uthaman' from aliens. Everyone dressed up as scientists and started enacting their respective roles. Bigg Boss gave Ranjini and Sabu the secret task of dismantling the body parts of the dead body and presenting it to him.
Week 8	Other Task	On Day 53, housemates were given saplings which had names of each of them. The task is to take care of the plant until they move out of the house.; Manichithrathazhu: On Day 55, all the housemates were supposed to take the key of the lock in their hand after cheating Shiyas who stands in front of the pole where the keys are kept.
Week 8	Daily Task	Navarasangal: On Day 54, Bigg Boss ordered Aditi to arrange for an acting training for the housemates. Anoop and Aditi taught Navarasas to the housemates in the garden area after some acting exercises.; Later, the task was a mock actor hunt for an upcoming movie. Ranjini and Sabu were chosen as the producer and director respectively. They gave roles to each housemates.
Week 9	Captaincy Task	Bigg Boss asked the housemates to select three people for the captaincy task. While Shiyas, the current captain, nominated Archana, others nominated Anoop and Aditi.; Adithettiyal: On Day 53, the task was to balance oneself in a speed board. Three housemates were ordered to walk together in the same speed board and the one who survives without falling from the board would be declared the winner.
Week 9	Result	Won - Anoop
Week 9	Nomination	On Day 56, host Mohanlal said that there is no eviction (week 8) as most of the viewers couldn't vote because of the floods in Kerala. He also said that all the 5 contestants (Archana, Pearle, Ranjini, Srinish and Suresh) continue to be in the eviction phase and the decision will be made next week (week 9). And hence, weekly nomination procedures were not conducted this time.
Week 9	Luxury Budget Task	Padayottam: On Day 58, the housemates were asked to form two groups and win the rounds to get access to different areas in the house.; Team Blue: Basheer, Hima, Sabumon, Shiyas, Srinish Team Yellow: Aditi, Archana, Pearle, Ranjini, Suresh Task 1: The first task to win the bathroom area was to bath with the given soap and the one who finishes it first becomes the winner. Sabu won the task for blue team defeating Ranjini.; Task 2: The second task to win the dining area and kitchen area was to clean the given plates. Out of the 30 give plates, Basheer cleaned the most and won the task for the blue team.; Task 3: The third task was a lock and key combination competition to win the bedroom area. The bedroom was locked with 5 locks and the keys were hidden in the pool. The task was to find the correct key and open the maximum number of locks. Suresh and the team yellow group won the competition.
Week 9	Exit	On Day 63, Ranjini Haridas evicted from the house after facing the public vote.
Week 10	Captaincy Task	On Day 60, housemates were asked to select the nominees for the captaincy task and they chose Basheer - Aditi - Hima for the task.; Malsara Changala: The three contenders were supposed to escape from the human chain created by the other housemates.
Week 10	Result	Won - Basheer
Week 10	Nomination	On Day 64, Bigg Boss announced the nomination process and all the contestants were asked to burn the photographs of two housemates they wish to nominate. Anoop, Hima, and Shiyas received the most votes for the nomination. Sabu used his special power and saved Hima. The captain nominated Pearle and hence Anoop, Pearle and Shiyas were nominated for the eviction.
Week 10	Luxury Budget Task	Azhukkine Aliyichu Kalayuka: On Day 65, The task was to wash and iron the clothes given to them. The clothes would reach them through the slide kept in the garden area. Housemates were divided into two groups. Pearle and Aditi were the assigned as inspectors, who would oversee the task. The team, which cleans the more clothes, will win the task.
Week 10	Secret Task	Sabu was called to the confession room and was given a secret task. The secret task was to isolate Shiyas in the house. All the housemates were supposed to act as if Shiyas doesn't exist.
Week 10	Daily Tasks	Puthiya Mugham: On Day 66, Housemates were asked to select one man and one woman for a makeover. Housemates chose Hima and Shiyas for the makeover. Hima chose to transform to a traditional look and Shiyas was dressed up as a woman.; Mokshanam Veekshanam: On Day 67, In the task, the housemates were given 10 balls each and asked to protect it. The housemates could snatch the balls from other boxes and the one, who has the maximum number of balls in their box will be the winner.; Basheer collected the maximum number of balls and became the winner.; Kanamarayathu: On Day 68, two housemates were asked to form a team and prepare a dish with the given ingredients and instructions. The judges of the contest were Pearle, Anoop, and Shiyas, the contestants nominated for eviction.
Week 10	Exit	On Day 70, Anoop Chandran evicted from the house after facing the public vote.
Week 11	Captaincy Task	Kabaddi Kabaddi: On Day 67, Archana, Hima and Srinish were the chosen housemates for the captaincy task. the contenders were supposed to defeat the other team and with the Kabadi game.
Week 11	Result	Won - Srinish
Week 11	Nomination	On Day 71, Bigg Boss announced the nomination task for the week. In the task, housemates had a balloon tied up to their feet and each should safeguard it from others. Housemates, who fail to save the balloon, will be nominated for eviction. Aditi, Archana, Hima and Shiyas were nominated for the eviction.
Week 11	Luxury Budget Task	On Day 72, Bigg Boss announced the luxury budget task of the week. The task was to complete each game and earn the points.; Task 1: Moonnaamura: The task was to sit in a bathtub full of ice cubes for a given time.; Task 2: Cheliyile Maanikyam: The task was to collect 50 coins in the pool of sludge within a given time.; Task 3: Karakkum Kanakku: The task was to calculate the whole of given numbers showing on a LED television while circulating on merry-go round.; Task 4: Thengakola: The task was to peel the given coconut within a given time.; Task 5: Thattilkutti Dosa: On Day 73, second day of the task, the fifth task was to make dosa with the given batter and eat the same within a certain time.
Week 11	Daily Task	Kadha Thudarum: On Day 72, In the task, housemates were asked to complete a story with the chosen words by each one.
Week 11	Sponsored Task	Maxo Bowling: On Day 74, Bigg Boss announced a special task for the team. Through the bowling task, housemates gave awareness about the various diseases spread by mosquitoes. After a tiebreaker, Team B led by Archana won the game.; Team A: Aditi, Hima, Pearle, Sabumon Team B: Archana, Basheer, Shiyas, Suresh Nerolac Vallam Kali: On Day 75, In the task, two teams were asked to paint the boat with the given paints. The red team won the game.; Team Blue: Aditi, Basheer, Shiyas, Suresh Team Red: Archana, Hima, Pearle, Sabumon
Week 11	Exit	On Day 77, Hima Shankar re-evicted from the house after facing the public vote.
Week 12	Captaincy Task	On Day 75, Bigg Boss announced to select the nominees for captaincy task. Housemates selected Shiyas, Suresh, Aditi, and Hima for the task.; Koottu Kettal: The four contenders were tied to a common point in the middle of a pool of mud. The pool was full of yellow balls which the players should take and put in their respective buckets.
Week 12	Result	Won - Aditi
Week 12	Nomination	On Day 78, Bigg Boss announced the nomination process. The housemates were asked to pierce knife into the heart shape over the photos of two contestants, whom they think doesn't deserve to be in the finale. Archana, Pearle, Sabumon and Srinsh were voted the most. Later, as the captain Aditi was given her special power to nominate any housemates directly. She nominated Basheer and Suresh. Hence Archana, Basheer, Pearle, Sabumon, Srinsh and Suresh are nominated for the eviction.
Week 12	Luxury Budget Task	Naatturajavu: On Day 79, In the task, one housemate will be selected as the Yuvaraja of the house and others are supposed to obey what the King says. Shiyas, who was in safe zone during the nomination, was selected as the Yuvaraja. later, Bigg Boss announced that Aditi is the new Yuvarani.; On Day 80, second day of the task, Luxury budget task continued and Suresh was sworn in as the new king. In the evening, Bigg Boss announced that hence Suresh was not successful as a King, he was advised to give the power to someone else. Suresh gave the golden key to Basheer and he ruled the house till the night.
Week 12	Daily Task	Olichukali: On Day 81, In the task, a team had to hide in the given cardboard boxes and the opponent team had to guess who is in which box.
Week 12	Exit	On Day 84, Basheer Bashi evicted from the house after facing the public vote.
Week 13	Nomination	On Day 85, Bigg Boss announced the housemates to nominate two contestants for the elimination. Each housemate went to the confession room and the nominated two substantiating their decision for nominating others. Sabu and Archana were nominated for the eviction. With the special power of the captain, Suresh nominated Shiyas and Pearle.
Week 13	Daily Task	Elluriraja: On Day 86, Bigg Boss announced the daily task. In the task, the housemates were divided into two groups and they had to snatch the bone kept in the middle of the activity area.; Paadaam Namukku Paadaam: On Day 87, In the dumb charades task, housemates tried guessing the popular Malayalam songs through the acts done by the other participants.; Ningalaanu Thaaram: On Day 88, The task was to stage an interview session and Shiyas- Srinish duo was the interviewers for 'Srinish and Shiyas show'. The duo approached each contestant and questioned about their life in the Bigg Boss House.; Aaranayal: On Day 88, In the task, housemates were asked to take one prop and act with it.; Veshappakarcha: On Day 89, In the task, each housemate was given one character and a prop with which they had to enact the given role.; Unnathangalil: On Day 90, Bigg Boss announced the task. In the task, both the teams were asked to arrange the given nuts with chopsticks.; The girls' team won this Boys vs. Girls task.
Week 13	Luxury Budget Task	Thapobalam: On Day 87, Bigg Boss announced the luxury budget task of the week, In the task, a team should bear all the tortures done by the opponent team. The moment they get up from the bench, they will be out of the game.; Kudathile Maanikyam: On Day 89, Bigg Boss announced the luxury task. One housemate was asked to hit the pots arranged in the garden area and win the luxury items in it.
Week 13	Sponsored Task	T-Shine Brahmanda Chithram: On Day 88, The task was to enact a play with the given plot, T-Shine Sperhero.
Week 13	Exit	On Day 91, Archana Suseelan evicted from the house after facing the public vote.
Week 14	Finalists	During the final week, the public vote for who should win Bigg Boss. The finalists for the title were as follows: ~~Aditi Rai~~ Pearle Maaney Sabumon Abdusamad Shiyas Kareem Srinish Aravind Aristo Suresh
Week 14	Luxury Budget Task	Aadaam Paadaam: On Day 93, In the task, the housemates were given a character and they should dance whenever the given song is played. Housemates were given special costumes for their respective characters.
Week 14	Daily Task	Madhurikkum Ormakal: On Day 93, In the task, housemates were asked to imagine meeting one of the contestants after the show and narrate the scene.; Kalippaavakal: On Day 94, In the Freeze - Reverse task, housemates were asked to follow the orders of Bigg Boss and act accordingly. The task went quite funny as the housemates started playing pranks with the contestant, who was in the 'Freeze' mode. Bigg Boss also implemented many twists in the 'Freeze and Reverse' game in most unexpected ways. Later, Bigg Boss announced that the remote of the task is hidden in the garden area and anyone, who finds it, can order other housemates.; Bigg Boss Naatturajyam: On Day 95, Pearle was chosen as the first queen of the house. She was given a crown and anyone, who could snatch it from her can take over the kingdom. The queen also had the power to punish the housemates, who don't obey her.
Week 14	Other Tasks	Veeranmare Munnott: On Day 94, In the task, the Adholokam heads (Sabu and Suresh) were asked to recruit capable members as the teammates.; Aparan: On Day 95, In the task, housemates were asked to enact a given situation The situation was, the housemates have returned home and learn that an imposter pretending to be them is already there. Housemates were asked to enact how they will convince their family members.
Week 14	Exit(s)	On Day 95, Bigg Boss ordered everyone to assemble in the garden area announced that there will be a mid-week elimination. Aditi Rai evicted from the house for receiving the fewest votes to win Bigg Boss.
Week 14	Winner	Sabumon Abdusamad
Week 14	Runner-up	Pearle Maaney
Week 14	Third Place	Shiyas Kareem
Week 14	Fourth Place	Srinish Aravind
Week 14	Fifth Place	Aristo Suresh

== Nominations table ==
	Week 1	Week 2	Week 3	Week 4	Week 5	Week 6	Week 7	Week 8	Week 9	Week 10	Week 11	Week 12	Week 13	Week 14		
	Week 1	Week 2	Week 3	Week 4	Week 5	Week 6	Week 7	Week 8	Week 9	Week 10	Week 11	Week 12	Week 13	Day 95	Final	
Nominees for House Captaincy	All; Housemates	Archana; Rajini	Anoop; Shwetha; Srinish	Basheer; Rajini; Sabumon	Aditi; Archana; Pearle	Anoop; Diya; Sabumon; Suresh	All; Housemates	Aditi; Anoop; Shiyas	Aditi; Anoop; Archana	Aditi; Basheer; Hima	Archana; Hima; Srinish	Aditi; Hima; Shiyas; Suresh	All; Housemates	No; Nominees		
House Captain	Shweta	Ranjini	Srinish	Ranjini	Pearle	Sabumon	Archana	Shiyas	Anoop	Basheer	Srinish	Aditi	Suresh	No Captain		
Captain's Nomination	Suresh	None	Ranjini (to save); Sreelakshmi (to evict)	Aditi; Srinish	Ranjini; Shweta	Basheer; Srinish	Aditi	Archana	None	Pearle	None	Basheer; Suresh	Pearle; Shiyas	No Captain		
Vote to:	Evict						Save/Evict	Evict	None	Evict	None	Evict		W I N		
Sabumon	Archana; Basheer	Hima; Pearle	Hima; Ranjini	Deepan; Srinish	Ranjini; Shweta	House; Captain	Himself (to evict)	Pearle; Suresh	No; Nominations	Hima (to save)	No; Nominations	Pearle; Srinish	Aditi; Shiyas	No; Nominations	Winner (Day 98)	
Pearle	Hima; Manoj	Srinish; Suresh	Deepan; Hima	Aditi; Deepan	House; Captain	Archana; Ranjini	Herself (to evict)	Ranjini; Sabumon	No; Nominations	Anoop; Sabumon	No; Nominations	Archana; Sabumon	Archana; Sabumon	No; Nominations	1st Runner-up (Day 98)	
Shiyas	Not In House	Entered (Day 15)	Exempt	Deepan; Pearle	Ranjini; Shweta	Archana; Diya	Himself (to save)	House; Captain	No; Nominations	Anoop; Sabumon	No; Nominations	Archana; Sabumon	Archana; Sabumon	No; Nominations	2nd Runner-up (Day 98)	
Srinish	Aditi; Anoop	Pearle; Suresh	House; Captain	Aditi; Sreelakshmi	Ranjini; Sweetha	Archana; Diya	Himself (to save)	Anoop; Ranjini	No; Nominations	Anoop; Hima	House; Captain	Archana; Sabumon	Archana; Sabumon	No; Nominations	3rd Runner-up (Day 98)	
Suresh	Aditi; Hima	Deepan; Hima	Basheer; Ranjini	Deepan; Sreelakshmi	Ranjini; Shweta	Archana; Diya	Himself (to evict)	Basheer; Ranjini	No; Nominations	Hima; Shiyas	No; Nominations	Archana; Sabumon	House; Captain	No; Nominations	4th Runner-up (Day 98)	
Aditi	Diya; David	Deepan; Pearle	Anoop; Pearle	Pearle; Srinish	Sabumon; Shweta	Archana; Diya	No; Nominations	Pearle; Srinish	No; Nominations	Anoop; Pearle	No; Nominations	House; Captain	Pearle; Srinish	No; Nominations	Evicted (Day 95)	
Archana	Aditi; David	Anoop; Pearle	Aditi; Sreelakshmi	Shiyas; Sreelakshmi	Shiyas; Shweta	Anoop; Shiyas	House; Captain	Srinish; Suresh	No; Nominations	Hima; Shiyas	No; Nominations	Pearle; Srinish	Srinish; Suresh	Evicted (Day 91)		
Basheer	Aditi; Srinish	Deepan; Diya	Ranjini; Shweta	Aditi; Sreelakshmi	Ranjini; Shweta	Archana; Diya	Himself (to save)	Archana; Ranjini	No; Nominations	House; Captain	No; Nominations	Pearle; Srinish	Evicted (Day 84)			
Hima	Aditi; Srinish	Anoop; Pearle	Ranjini; Sabumon	Evicted (Day 21)				Srinish; Suresh	No; Nominations	Anoop; Suresh	No; Nominations	Re-evicted (Day 77)				
Anoop	Aditi; Srinish	Deepan; Hima	Hima; Ranjini	Sreelakshmi; Srinish	Ranjini; Shweta	Archana; Diya	Himself (to evict)	Pearle; Srinish	House; Captain	Hima; Shiyas	Evicted (Day 70)					
Ranjini	David; Srinish	House; Captain	Anoop; Sabumon	House; Captain	Basheer; Suresh	Basheer; Pearle	Herself (to save)	Pearle; Suresh	No; Nominations	Evicted (Day 63)						
Anjali	Not In House				Entered (Day 35)	Pearle; Suresh	Walked (Day 43)									
Diya	Aditi; David	Pearle; Suresh	Ranjini; Sreelakshmi	Aditi; Shiyas	Ranjini; Shweta	Basheer; Pearle	Evicted (Day 42)									
Shweta	House; Captain	Hima; Suresh	Anoop; Basheer	Deepan; Srinish	Anoop; Suresh	Evicted (Day 35)										
Sreelakshmi	David; Diya	Anoop; Hima	Archana; Sabumon	Deepan; Srinish	Evicted (Day 28)											
Deepan	Aditi; Basheer	Anoop; Suresh	Ranjini; Shweta	Pearle; Shiyas	Evicted (Day 28)											
David	Aditi; Archana	Evicted (Day 7)														
Manoj	Diya; Hima	Walked (Day 4)														
Notes	1	2, 3	4	5, 6	7	8, 9	10, 11, 12, 13, 14	15, 16	16	17, 18	19	20	21	22	None	
Against Public Vote	Aditi; David; Diya; Hima; Srinish; Suresh	Anoop; Deepan; Hima; Pearle; Suresh	Anoop; Hima; Sabumon; Sreelakshmi	Aditi; Deepan; Sreelakshmi; Srinish	Ranjini; Shweta	~~Archana~~; Basheer; Diya; Pearle; Srinish	Aditi; Anoop; Pearle; Sabu; Suresh	Archana; Pearle; Ranjini; Srinish; Suresh		Anoop; Pearle; Shiyas	Aditi; Archana; Hima; Shiyas	Archana; Basheer; Pearle; Sabumon; Srinish; Suresh	Archana; Pearle; Sabumon; Shiyas	Aditi; Pearle; Sabumon; Shiyas; Srinish; Suresh	Pearle; Sabumon; Shiyas; Srinish; Suresh	
Walked	Manoj	none					Anjali	none								
Re-entry	none							Hima	none							
Evicted	David	No; Eviction	Hima	Sreelakshmi	Shweta	Diya	No; Eviction		Ranjini	Anoop	Hima	Basheer	Archana	Aditi	Suresh	Srinish
Evicted	David	No; Eviction	Hima	Deepan	Shweta	Diya	No; Eviction		Ranjini	Anoop	Hima	Basheer	Archana	Aditi	Shiyas	Pearle
Evicted	David	No; Eviction	Hima	Deepan	Shweta	Diya	No; Eviction		Ranjini	Anoop	Hima	Basheer	Archana	Aditi	Sabumon	

=== Notes ===
indicates the House Captain.
indicates the housemate was directly nominated for eviction prior to the regular nominations process.
indicates the housemate was granted immunity from nominations.
indicates the winner.
indicates the first runner up.
indicates the second runner up.
indicates the third runner up.
indicates the fourth runner up.
- ^Note 1: Manoj left the show due to his poor health conditions.
- ^Note 2: The house captain was asked to nominate 7 out of all the contestants to be in the nomination list in which the co-housemates could select two for this week's nomination. Captain chose Anoop, Hima, Deepan, Diya, Pearle, Srinish and Suresh.
- ^Note 3: Pearle and Suresh were safe and Anoop was about to evict but Shweta's decision to forgive him for confronting her in the captaincy task made him safe from eviction. Hence, No housemate evicted on Week 2.
- ^Note 4: As a new housemate, Shiyas was exempted from the eviction and nomination procedures.
- ^Note 5: Housemates mutually decided Aditi, Deepan, Pearle, Sreelakshmi, Shiyas and Srinish to be in the nomination list. Later, each housemate chose two among these to be nominated. Finally, Aditi, Deepan, Sreelakshmi, and Srinish got nominated for eviction.
- ^Note 6: After Sreelakshmi's eviction on day 27, Deepan was evicted on day 28. For the first time, two housemates were evicted from the house in the same week.
- ^Note 7: Housemates were assembled in the activity area. They individually asked to paint the face and shared the opinion about their nominations. Ranjini and Shweta were nominated for eviction with seven and ten votes respectively and on day 35, Shweta evicted from the show after facing the public votes.
- ^Note 8: As a new housemate, Anjali was exempted from being nominated but she was allowed to nominate two housemates.
- ^Note 9: Archana saved herself from eviction by winning the captaincy task.
- ^Note 10: Aditi and Anjali could not end up in a decision about their nomination. Both the housemates were not ready to be nominated for eviction.
- ^Note 11: Bigg Boss ordered Archana to choose one between Anjali and Aditi for the eviction. Archana chose Aditi saying that Anjali has recently come to the house.
- ^Note 12: On Day 44, Anjali was taken to the hospital after becoming ill and on Day 45, she left the show due to her poor health conditions.
- ^Note 13: Aditi received fewer votes and was technically evicted from the show but Anjali Ameer called and asked Mohanlal that nobody should be evicted from the house. She said that she loves Aditi a lot. She requested Mohanlal to avoid the eviction at any cost. Upon Anjali's request, the eviction was canceled.
- ^Note 14: On Day 49, ex-contestant Hima Shankar re-entered the house as a wildcard.
- ^Note 15: Hima was exempted from being nominated but she was allowed to nominate two housemates.
- ^Note 16: Keralites were not able to vote in the poll due to heavy rain and flood. Mohanlal revealed that the same nominees will be there in the eviction list on next week too.
- ^Note 17: On day 63, by winning a task, Ranjini achieved immune to be safe in the next nominations but later, she was evicted on the same day after facing the public votes and passed on her immune power to Archana.
- ^Note 18: On day 63, by winning a task, Sabumon achieved a special power to save a nominated housemate. He saved Hima from the nominations.
- ^Note 19: The nomination procedure was based on a task. Housemates had a balloon tied up to their feet and each should safeguard it from others. Housemates, who fail to save the balloon were nominated for eviction.
- ^Note 20: The housemates were asked to pierce knife into the heart shape over the photos of two contestants, whom they think doesn't deserve to be in the finale. Archana, Pearle, Sabumon and Srinsh were voted the most. Later, the captain Aditi was given her special power to nominate any housemates directly. She nominated Basheer and Suresh. Hence Archana, Basheer, Pearle, Sabumon, Srinsh and Suresh are nominated for the eviction.
- ^Note 21: Since Suresh never became a house captain till week 12, he was appointed as the house captain for one day (Monday, the day of nomination). But the housemates were allowed to nominate the captain for eviction.
- ^Note 22: On Day 95, Bigg Boss ordered everyone to assemble in the garden area announced that there will be a mid-week elimination. Aditi Rai evicted from the house for receiving the fewest votes to win Bigg Boss.

== Ratings and viewership ==
Official ratings are taken from BARC India.
(TRP of the episodes telecasting in Asianet only)

Grand Premiere
TVR Rating	Viewers (in millions)
10.33	20.5
