= Hima Shankar =

Indian actress

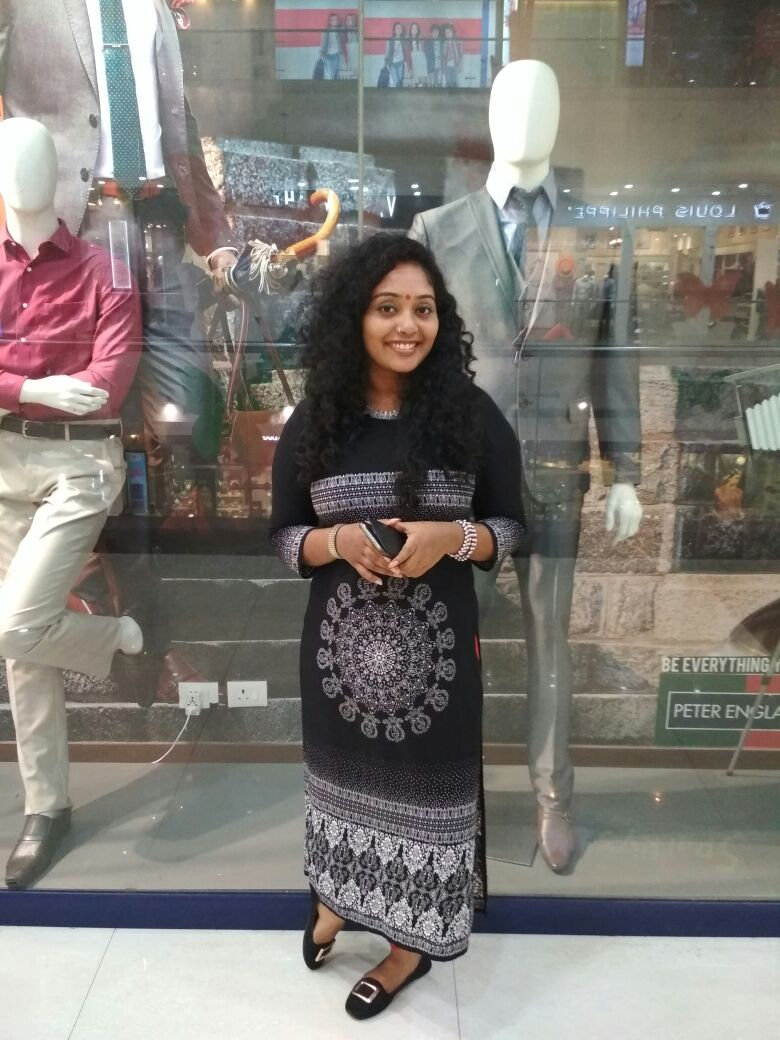
- Born: Hima Shankar; 2nd June; Kodakara, Kerala, India
- Education: University of Calicut School of Drama and Fine Arts
- Occupations: Film actress; theatre artist
- Years active: 2004–present

Hima Shankar known as Hima Shankar Sheematty, is an Indian actress who appears in Malayalam films and short films. She has also directed and performed in many theatrical works. She took a part in the reality show Bigg Boss Malayalam.

== Early life ==
Hima Shankar was born in Thrissur, Kerala, India, to N K Shankaran Kutty and E V Kumari. She did her schooling in St. Don Bosco Girls High School, Kodakara and intermediate in Rajarshi Memorial Higher Secondary School, Aloor, Kerala. She has completed her graduation in BA in Sanskrit Vedanta from Sree Sankaracharya University of Sanskrit, Kalady. Subsequently, she developed interest in theatre and joined University of Calicut School of Drama and Fine Arts, Thrissur for taking up post graduate degree in Theatre Arts. She played a character called Jennifer in TV serial, Ente Manasaputhri on Asianet. She was also part of some advertisements and albums. She runs an institution also. She is an acting trainer too.

== Career ==
Hima Shankar has started her career as a theatre artist later on moving to the Malayalam Film industry. She has enacted in the most discussed plays in Malayalam which were staged in the 2010s. Being an alumna of the Drama School of Kerala, she has succeeded in balancing the engagement on the stage and in the screen. She is found to be an actor with opinion on the current social issues and observed to be outspoken always. Hence, she is a panel member in evening newsroom discussions on social issues.

She was one of the contestant of Bigg Boss (Malayalam season 1) and got evicted on day 21. Later, she entered the house as a wildcard contestant on day 49, and got eliminated on day 77.

== Filmography ==
List of Hima Shankar film credits
Year	Film	Role	Notes
2010	Sufi Paranja Katha	Parukkutty	
2010	Yugapurushan	Ponni	
2010	Apoorvaragam	Agi	
2010	Nalla Pattukare	Reshma	
2011	Seniors	Friend of Jeni	
2012	Thalsamayam Oru Penkutty	Neethu	
2013	Pothumappu	Susie	
2014	Iyobinte Pusthakam	Migrant	
2014	Niharika	Special appearance	
2016	Ottakolam	Aashatty	Won—Vayalar Ramavarma Special Jury Award: Lead role
2017	Aaradi	Sini	Lead role
2017	Himalayathile Kashmalan	Hima	Lead role
2017	Duryodhana	Sneha Nangyar	
2018	Naam		
2019	Bhayam	Heera	
2023	Ochu		
2023	Neelarathri		
2023	Chappa Kuthu		
2024	Sevakar		Tamil film
2025	Off Road		
2025	Randam Yamam	Janaki	
TBA	Ram	TBA	

== Short filmography ==
Year	Short Film	Role	Details
2017	Safety Pin	Heroine	
2017	Kalpaanthakaalam	Pollothy	1."KALPANTHAKALAM has been won 13 awards including 2 state awards. - YouTube". YouTube. 23 May 2017. 2."Playing the serpent girl: Hima Shankar". 16 June 2015.
2016	Yaksham	Bhagavathy	1."Yaksham (യക്ഷം) | Short Film 2016 | Hima Sankar | Arun C. Kumar | - YouTube". YouTube. 17 May 2016. 2."ഓരോ സ്ത്രീയിലും ഒരു യക്ഷിയുണ്ട്". 3."The Risks of Divinity". 16 June 2016.
2016	Kani	Kani	"Kani - The Rape Movie (Fight for her life and land) - YouTube". YouTube.
2016	King of Mallus	Lover	
2015	Spicy Girls	Paru	"SPICY GIRLS - Hima Shankar Sheematty l Sensational Short Film - YouTube". YouTube. 5 October 2015.
2014	One Fine Day	Lovely	
2013	Sharkarasya Gajah	Mother	"Sharkarasya Gajah - The kid who wanted an Elephant! | Short Film | By Rajesh Kumar Sharma - YouTube". YouTube. 13 May 2013.
2008	Zyme	The prostitute	

== Theatrical Works ==
Year	Play	Role	Theatre Group
2006	Sakharam Binder	Champa	Abhinaya, Trivandrum
2008	Pravaachaka	Atheena	Nireeksha Women's Theatre, Trivandrum
2009	The Valley Song	Veronica Jhonkers	Theatre of Good Hope, Trivandrum
2009	Women Without Men	Farooq	Nireeksha Women's Theatre, Trivandrum
2010	The Lesson	The Old Maid	Abhinaya, Trivandrum
2011	Oru Kathaanaadakam	Neena Patwardhan	Theatre of Good Hope, Trivandrum
2011	Yamadoothu, After the death of Othello	Desdemona	Janabheri Theatre, Thrissur
2013	Draavidaputhri	Tataka	ACT Cochin
2014	Njayaraazhcha	Siter Angelina	Njamanengad Theatre Village, Thrissur
2016	Deergha Chathuram	Ammu	Soorya, Trivandrum
2016	Chaayakkada Kathakal-Bheeman Ravunni	Ammu	Soorya, Trivandrum
2016	Chaayakkada Kathakal-Munshi Veeraraghavan	Niranjana	Soorya, Trivandrum
2016	Chaayakkada Kathakal-Amma Thankamma	Amma Thankamma	Soorya, Trivandrum

== TV/online shows ==
- Comedy Kondattam (Flowers)
- B Positive (Kairali News)
- Lavender (Kaumudy TV)
- Meet The Editors (Reporter TV)
- News n Views (Kairali News)
- e Buz (Mathrubhumi News)
- Charutha (Kerala Vision)
- Varthaprabhatham (Asianet News)
- Chayakoottu (DD Malayalam)
- Malayali Darbar (Amrita TV)
- Morning Guest (Media One)
- Meet My Guest (Rosewbowl/ACV)
- Morning Show (Mathrubhumi News)
- Chuttuvattam (Asianet News)
- Midday News (Jaihind TV)
- Sreekandan Nair Show (Surya TV)
- Nammal Thammil (Asianet)
- Chat with a Star
- Manorama News
- M7News
- Manorama Online
- Malayali Vartha
- Malayali Life Chit Chat
- Asianetnews.com
- E Times
- Kerala Talkies
- News X
- HotNSour TV
- Cinilife
- Jangospace
- Metromatinee
- Oneindia Malayalam

Reality shows

- 2018 : Bigg Boss (Malayalam season 1) (Asianet) - Evicted on Day 77
- 2019 : Boeing Boeing (Zee Keralam)

== TV series ==
- 2007-Ente Manasaputhri (Asianet) as Jennifer

== Advertisements ==
- Girl Self Employed
- Manorama Magazine

== Albums ==
- Sreenandhanam
