= Yeh Hai Mohabbatein =

Indian drama television series

- Genre: Drama; Romance
- Created by: Ekta Kapoor
- Based on: Custody by Manju Kapur
- Developed by: Ekta Kapoor
- Written by: Sonali Jaffar; Ritu Bhatia; Ritu Goel; Muhammad Haris Siddiqui
- Directed by: Partho Mitra; Kumar Singh; Neeraj Baliyan; Abhishek Kumar R Pal
- Creative director: Raaga Arif
- Starring: See below
- Opening theme: Pamela Jain
- Country of origin: India
- Original language: Hindi
- No. of seasons: 1
- No. of episodes: 1,895

Production
- Producers: Ekta Kapoor; Shobha Kapoor
- Cinematography: Maneesh Malik
- Editors: Vikas Sharma; Vishal Sharma
- Camera setup: Multi-camera
- Running time: 22 minutes
- Production company: Balaji Telefilms

Original release
- Network: StarPlus
- Release: 3 December 2013 – 18 December 2019

Related
- Yeh Hai Chahatein

Yeh Hai Mohabatein (transl. This Is Love) is an Indian romance drama produced by Ekta Kapoor under Balaji Telefilms, One of the longest running Indian television soap opera, the series starred Divyanka Tripathi Dahiya, Karan Patel, Ruhanika Dhawan, and Aly Goni. The story was initially based on Manju Kapur's 2011 novel Custody, with Yeh Hai Mohabbatein continuing beyond Custody's story in later episodes.

== Plot ==
Tamil dentist Ishita Iyer and Punjabi businessman Raman Kumar Bhalla are neighbours in Delhi. Ishita is infertile, making it difficult for her mother to find her a husband, while Raman is a divorced father. Ishita becomes attached to Raman’s daughter, Ruhi, who was abandoned by Raman’s ex-wife, Shagun Arora, after she left him for her wealthy boss, Ashok Khanna. Ishita and Raman initially dislike each other, and their families frequently clash because of cultural differences.

To secure custody of Ruhi, Ishita and Raman agree to a marriage of convenience for her sake. Shagun’s younger brother, Mihir Arora, becomes close to Raman and falls in love with Ishita’s cousin Mihika. During preparations for Ashok and Shagun’s wedding, Ashok falls for Mihika instead, leading to scandal and heartbreak for Mihir and Shagun. Mihika eventually marries Ashok.

As they face family problems together, Ishita and Raman gradually fall in love. Ishita becomes the emotional support of both the Bhalla and Iyer families, helping them through numerous crises involving relatives and rivalries. Shagun, bitter after Ashok’s betrayal, repeatedly interferes in their lives but later reforms. She reunites Raman with his son Aditya, who had been adopted by Ashok, and becomes the surrogate mother of Ishita and Raman’s daughter, Pihu.

Nidhi, a lawyer obsessed with Raman, kidnaps Pihu. Ishita sacrifices Ruhi to save her daughter, and after an accident both Ishita and Raman are presumed dead. Raman blames Ishita for the tragedy and cuts ties with her, while Ishita, overwhelmed with guilt, attempts suicide and is also believed dead.

Ishita is later revealed to be alive in Australia, living with her childhood friend Mani and raising his niece, Aliya. Aliya works for celebrity Ruhaan, who is actually an adult Ruhi living under a false identity and trapped by the abusive Nidhi. Raman, meanwhile, raises Pihu alongside Shagun and resents Ishita. After Ishita uncovers Ruhaan’s true identity, she reunites with Raman. Nidhi is arrested for her crimes, including the murder of Ishita’s elder sister. Aditya marries Aliya, but Pihu refuses to accept Ishita as her mother because she believes Raman and Shagun are her parents.

Shagun, Mani, Aliya, and Pihu later move to Bangkok. Pihu eventually reconciles with Ishita and returns to India with the family. Soon after, Pihu quarrels with her cousin Ananya, who accidentally falls to her death. Ishita takes the blame to protect Pihu and is imprisoned.

Raman’s sister Simmi and her husband Parmeet Khurana torture Raman and Ishita over Ananya’s death. Simmi causes Raman to lose his memory, making him forget Ishita, and he prepares to marry Mihika. It is eventually revealed that Mihika and Romi were never truly separated and that Ishita staged the situation to help Raman recover his memory. Aditya then turns against Raman and has an affair with Roshni Later he kidnaps Roshni after betraying Aliya. Ishita fatally shoots Aditya to save Roshni.

Months later, Ishita shelters the pregnant Roshni, carrying Aditya’s child, but the family blames Ishita for Aditya’s death and throws her out. Raman and the family apologizes to Ishita for badly they treated her after Aditya died, and they reunite. Roshni leaves to avoid further conflict, while Mihika and Romi adopt her son and rename him Aditya. Simmi later reforms, Param is imprisoned, and the family completely reconciles.

Ruhi falls in love with Karan, while Karan’s brother Rohan falls for the widowed Aliya. Both couples marry, only to discover the brothers initially married them to avenge a past conflict involving their mother, Sudha. Eventually, Karan and Rohan genuinely fall in love with Ruhi and Aliya. The family later meets Yug, Aditya’s lookalike. Aliya falls for him, Sudha reforms, and Yug eventually marries Aliya.

Rohan later dies saving Raman in a bomb blast. Raman is drugged by Arjit Saxena and falls into a coma, but recovers with Ishita’s care. Before marrying Karan, Ruhi discovers she is infertile, just like Ishita. Although Sudha initially opposes the marriage, she eventually accepts Ruhi. Ruhi and Karan marry and adopt a baby girl.

The story ends happily with Ishita and Raman remarrying. At their reception, Preesha Srinivasan, a gynaecologist and Ishita’s niece, arrives while raising her nephew Saransh alone, leading into Yeh Hai Chahatein.

== Cast ==
=== Main ===
- Divyanka Tripathi as Dr. Ishita Iyer Bhalla: Dentist; Vishwanathan and Madhavi's younger daughter (2013–2019)
- Karan Patel as Raman Kumar Bhalla: A Businessman and CEO of Bhalla Group; Omprakash and Santoshi's elder son (2013–2019)
- Anita Hassanandani as Shagun Arora Raghav: Poornima's daughter (2013–2019)
- Sumeet Sachdev as Abhimanyu Raghav: Shagun's second husband (2014–2019)
- Aly Goni as Romesh "Romi" Bhalla: Omprakash and Santoshi's younger son (2013–2019)
- Aditi Bhatia as Ruhi Bhalla Srivastav: Raman and Shagun's daughter (2016–2019)
  - Ruhanika Dhawan as
    - Child Ruhi Bhalla (2013–2016)
    - Pihu Bhalla: Raman and Ishita's daughter (2016–2019)
- Abhishek Verma as
  - Aditya Bhalla: Raman and Shagun's son (2016–2018)
    - Gautam Ahuja as Child Aditya Bhalla (2013–2016)
  - Yug Sharma: Aditya's look-alike (2019)
- Krishna Mukherjee as Aliya Raghav Sharma: Abhimanyu and Shagun's adopted daughter (2016–2019)
- Reyaansh Vir Chadha as Karan Srivastav: Sudha's younger son (2018–2019)

=== Iyers ===
- Abhay Bhargava as Vishwanathan Iyer: Madhavi's husband (2013–2019)
- Neena Kulkarni as Madhavi Iyer: Soumya's sister (2013–2019)

=== Bhallas ===
- Kaushal Kapoor as Omprakash Bhalla: Shaila's brother (2013–2019)
- Shahnaz Rizwan / Usha Rana as Santoshi Bhalla: Omprakash's wife (2013–2019)
- Shireen Mirza as Simran "Simmi" Bhalla: Omprakash and Santoshi's elder daughter (2013–2019)
- Mihika Verma / Avantika Hundal as Mihika Bhalla (formerly Khanna): Soumya's daughter (2013–2016) / (2016–2019)
- Neeru Agarwal as Neelu: Bhalla family's maid (2013–2018)

=== Chandrans ===
- Anjali Ujawane as Devyani Chandran: Bala and Subramaniam's mother; (2013–2017)
- Pankaj Bhatia as Bala Chandran: Devyani's elder son; (2013–2019)
- Shruti Bapna as Vandita "Vandu" Iyer Chandran: Madhavi and Vishwanathan's elder daughter; (2013–2017)
- Amita Yadav as Kiran Chandran: Bala's second wife; (2017–2019)
- Mihir Arora as Shravan Chandran: Vandita and Bala's son; (2016–2018)
  - Bhavesh Jaiswal as child Shravan (2013–2016)
- Bhanujeet Sudan / Amit Tandon as Subramaniam Chandran: Devayani's younger son; (2013–2015)
- Shahina Surve as Lakshmi Chandran: Subramaniam's first wife; (2015)

=== Srivastavs ===
- Varun Parashar as Dr. Rajat Srivastav: Sudha and Koko's brother (2018)
- Sudha Chandran as Sudha Srivastav: Koko and Rajat's sister; (2018–2019)
- Abhishek Malik as Rohan Srivastav: Sudha's elder son; (2018–2019)

=== Others ===
- Vineet Raina / Raj Singh Arora as Mihir Arora: Poornima's son (2013) / (2013–2016)
- Resha Konkar as Rinky Bhalla Arora: Omprakash and Santoshi's younger daughter (2013–2015)
- Vineet Kumar Chaudhary as Suraj Kumar Khanna: Ashok's elder brother; (2014-2019)
- Sangram Singh as Ashok Khanna: Suraj's younger brother (2013–2018)
- Anurag Sharma as Parmeet "Param" Khurana: Simran's ex-husband (2013–2019)
- Kavya Ramnani as Ananya Khurana: Simran and Parmeet's daughter (2016–2017)
- Neel Motwani as Advocate Neel Pathak: Bhalla family's lawyer; Trisha's fiancé (2014–2016)
- Garima Jain as Trisha Tandon Pathak: Rajeev's sister (2014)
- Sarika Dhillon as Sarika Singh: Abhishek's sister (2014–2016)
- Vivek Dahiya as Inspector Abhishek Singh: Sarika's brother (2015–2017)
- Sweety Walia as Pammi Mehra: Santosh's friend (2013–2018)
- Deep Jaitley as Prateek: Ishita's suitor (2013–2014)
- Yukti Kapoor as Mayura Dunavati: Ishita's colleague (2013)
- Shakti Arora as Ishita's suitor (2013)
- Arti Singh as Kriti: Ishita's college friend (2013)
- Gaurav Nanda as Rajeev Tandon: Trisha's brother (2014–2015)
- Shivani Mahajan as Advocate Kaul (2014); Ishita hires her for her mother's accident case
- Arshima Thapar as Sanjana Arora: Mihir and Shagun's fake sister (2014)
- Karishma Sharma as Raina Singh: Bala's blackmailer (2014)
- Hargun Grover as Nikhil Malhotra: Rinki's former fiancé (2015)
- Priya Shinde as Dr. Anita: Ishita's psychiatrist (2015)
- Parveen Kaur as Aditi: a psychiatrist (2015)
- Kanisha Malhotra as ACP Shalini (2015)
- Asha Negi as Koyal Ghosh (2015)
- Niyati Joshi as Shaila Vanraj: Omprakash's sister (2015)
- Gulki Joshi as Neha Vanraj: Shaila's daughter (2015)
- Anju Mahendru as Sujata Kumar: Lakshmi's mother (2015)
- Arishfa Khan as Vinni (2015)
- Ruchika Rajput as Vinni's mother (2015)
- Gopal Singh as Chand Mishra (2015)
- Abhilash Chaudhary as Mihika's friend (2015)
- Navina Bole as Dimple: Nikhil's sister (2015)
- Darshan Pandya as Prateek Sharma: Abhishek's friend (2015–2016)
- Manoj Chandila as Dr. Manoj Paul: Ishita's gynaecologist; Shagun's ex-fiancé (2015–2016)
- Swati Kapoor as Sanchi (2016)
- Avdeep Sidhu as Anil Nagpal: Raman's lawyer (2016)
- Lalit Bisht as Amarnath Chaddha: Pallavi's husband (2016)
- Garima Kapoor as Pallavi Amarnath Chaddha: Amarnath's wife (2016)
- Manish Khanna as Shyam Raichand (2016)
- Zareena Roshan Khan as Ismail's mother (2016)
- Kiran Bhargava as Shobhna Venkatesh: Upamanyu and Abhimanyu's mother (2016–2017)
- Pavitra Punia as Advocate Nidhi Chhabra: Sohail's sister (2016–2017)
- Gaurav Wadhwa as Sohail Chhabra: Nidhi's brother; (2016–2017)
- Sid Makkar as Vidyut: Raman and Shagun's friend (2016–2017)
- Deepak Wadhwa as Gaurav Bajaj: Simran's ex-lover (2016–2017)
- Anupama Solanki as Shweta: Raman's personal secretary (2016–2019)
- Benazir Shaikh as Divya: Abhishek's fiancé (2017)
- Ribbhu Mehra as Nikhil: Ruhi's former lover (2017–2018)
- Vidisha as Roshni: Sr. Aditya's lover (2017–2018)
- Gagan Anand as Gagan: Chandan's brother (2017)
- Hritu Dudhani as Pooja: Nikhil's former wife (2017)
- Drishti Hemdev as Riya: Nikhil and Pooja's daughter; (2017)
- Alefia Kapadia as Bhavna: Paranormal Expert (2018)
- Charu Mehra as Sonakshi Gupta/Aarushi Gupta (2018)
- Sharat Sonu as Keshav Kumar Dalmiya (2018)
- Ankit Bhatia as Sudha's lawyer (2018)
- Dinesh Mehta as Vijender (2018)
- Lankesh Bhardwaj as Police Inspector
- Ajay Kumar Nain as Sahil Shah: Muskaan's brother; (2019)
- Hemaakshi Ujjain as Muskaan Shah: Sahil's sister (2019)
- Mithil Jain as Arjit Saxena: Neeti's father (2019)
- Chaitanya Choudhury as Shardul Sinha: Ishita's friend; Natasha's husband (2019)
- Sapna Thakur as Natasha: Sunny's sister; (2019)
- Ansh Kukreja as Sunny: Natasha's brother (2019)
- Anuja Walhe as Dr. Sunita (2019)
- Unknown as Mr. Kakkar; owner of Kakkar Jewellers and Bhalla family's jeweller (2013–2019)

=== Guest appearances ===
- Hina Khan as Akshara Maheshwari Singhania from Yeh Rishta Kya Kehlata Hai (2014)
- Karan Mehra as Naitik Singhania from Yeh Rishta Kya Kehlata Hai (2014)
- Shraddha Kapoor and Sidharth Malhotra to promote Ek Villain (2014) (special appearance)
- Digangana Suryavanshi as Veera Kaur Singh from Ek Veer Ki Ardaas...Veera (2014)
- Vishal Vashishtha as Baldev Singh from Ek Veer Ki Ardaas...Veera (2014)
- Deepika Padukone and Arjun Kapoor to promote Finding Fanny (2014)
- Avinash Sachdev as Shlok Agnihotri from Iss Pyaar Ko Kya Naam Doon? Ek Baar Phir (2015)
- Shrenu Parikh as Aastha Kirloskar Agnihotri from Iss Pyaar Ko Kya Naam Doon? Ek Baar Phir (2015)
- Sameer Sharma as Varad Agnihotri from Iss Pyaar Ko Kya Naam Doon? Ek Baar Phir (2015)
- Shalmalee Desai as Sojal Agnihotri from Iss Pyaar Ko Kya Naam Doon? Ek Baar Phir (2015)
- Grace Girdhar as Child Kavya Agnihotri from Iss Pyaar Ko Kya Naam Doon? Ek Baar Phir (2015)
- Shabir Ahluwalia as Abhishek (Abhi) Prem Mehra from Kumkum Bhagya (2015)
- Sriti Jha as Pragya Arora Mehra from Kumkum Bhagya (2015)
- Salman Khan to promote Bajrangi Bhaijaan (2015)
- Namit Das as Sumit to promote Sumit Sambhal Lega (2015)
- Manasi Parekh as Maya to promote Sumit Sambhal Lega (2015)
- Tushar Kapoor and Aftab Shivdasani to promote Kyaa Kool Hain Hum 3 (2016)
- Emraan Hashmi to promote Azhar (2016)
- Kunal Jaisingh as Omkara Singh Oberoi from Ishqbaaaz (2016)
- Nakuul Mehta as Shivaay Singh Oberoi from Ishqbaaaz (2016)
- Leenesh Mattoo as Rudra Singh Oberoi from Ishqbaaaz (2016)
- Ranbir Kapoor and Anushka Sharma to promote Ae Dil Hai Mushkil (2016)
- Devoleena Bhattacharjee as Gopi Kapadia Modi from Saath Nibhaana Saathiya (2016)
- Mohammad Nazim as Ahem Modi from Saath Nibhaana Saathiya (2016)
- Deepika Singh Goyal as Sandhya Kothari Rathi from Diya Aur Baati Hum (2016)
- Anas Rashid as Sooraj Rathi from Diya Aur Baati Hum (2016)
- Drashti Dhami and Alka Amin to promote Pardes Mein Hai Meraa Dil (2016)
- Arjun Bijlani from Pardes Mein Hai Meraa Dil (2016)
- Karam Rajpal as Shivam Srivastav from Mere Angne Mein (2016)
- Ekta Kaul as Riya Srivastav from Mere Angne Mein (2016)
- Arjun Kapoor and Shraddha Kapoor to promote Half Girlfriend (2017)
- Barun Sobti to promote Iss Pyaar Ko Kya Naam Doon 3
- Mahima Makwana to promote Rishton Ka Chakravyuh (2017)
- Supriya Pathak to promote Khichdi Returns (2018)
- Rani Mukerji to promote the movie Hichki (2018)
- Mohit Sehgal as Himself (2018)
- RJ Alok as Radio Jockey (2019)
- Sargun Kaur Luthra as Dr. Preesha Srinivasan to promote Yeh Hai Chahatein (2019)
- Dipika Kakar Ibrahim as Sonakshi Rastogi from Kahaan Hum Kahaan Tum (2019)

== Production ==
=== Development and premiere ===
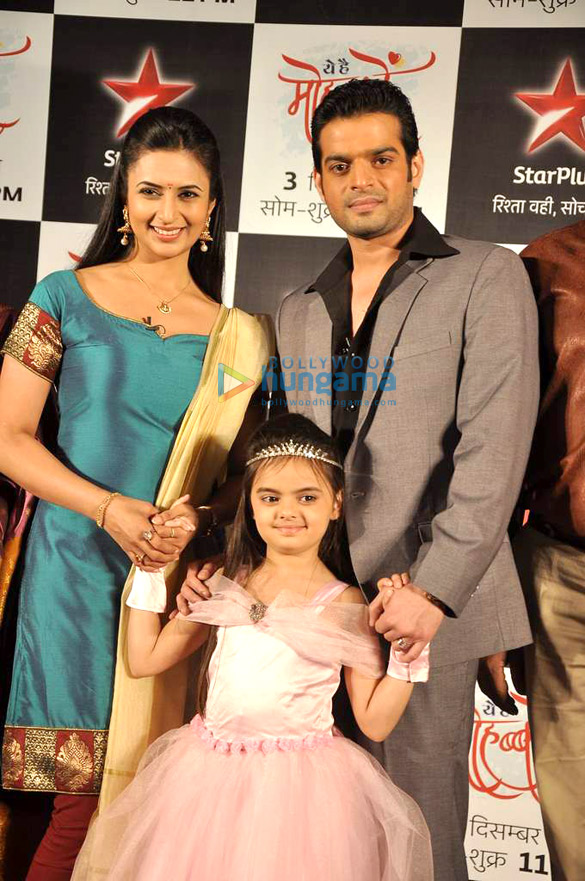
Divyanka Tripathi Dahiya, Karan Patel and Ruhanika Dhawan as Raman, Ishita, and Ruhi during the launch of Yeh Hai Mohabbatein

Kapoor said, "I created Divyanka's character as a dentist in 'Yeh Hai Mohabbatein', as I was having a lot of tooth trouble those days. My dentist sorted my problems a lot, so I brought that character alive"

The show was initially titled Custody as it was based on Manju Kapur's 2011 novel Custody. It was renamed to Mera Tera Rishta Purana before again being changed to Yeh Hai Mohabbatein. The production began about a year before its premiere, but the launch was delayed due to creative differences and desired time slots being unavailable.

In November 2019, Ekta Kapoor revealed, "When I started Yeh Hai Mohabbatein, I remember going to Gaurav Banerjee from Star Plus and asking him for a non-prime time slot because I wanted to do a show on a social issue. I had stopped watching much television and I wanted to make YHM without the trappings of a TRP driven show. A show about a woman who cannot have children, a stepmother who according to Indian terms is considered bad! Words in India like barren and evil stepmother got used so often and labelled women in the worst poss way. This show got so much love that it went on for six years. And from a non-prime time slot to a prime-time slot."

In September 2014, Deepika Padukone and Arjun Kapoor were to promote their film Finding Fanny, which also starred the Yeh Hai Mohabbatein lead Tripathi Dahiya and Patel. Patel was unable to make the shooting, and so the script was changed in his absence at the last minute, as Deepika and Arjun could not reschedule.

On 11 May 2016, during filming of the wedding sequence of characters Romi and Mihika, the shoot was stalled owing to a fight between the production house and workers union. On 25 July 2018, the shoot was stalled for a while during bandh in Mumbai.

=== Casting ===
Divyanka Tripathi Dahiya was selected by Kapoor to play Ishita Iyer Bhalla. Cezanne Khan was first approached to play Raman Bhalla opposite Tripathi Dahiya but was replaced by Karan Patel. Child actor Ruhanika Dhawan was chosen to play Ruhi Bhalla. Sayantani Ghosh was initially considered but Anita Hassanandani was selected to play Shagun Arora. Other cast members then chosen were Aly Goni, Mihika Verma, Shruti Bapna, Neena Kulkarni, Shahnaz Rizwan, Kaushal Kapoor, Abhay Bhargava and Gautam Ahuja.

In March 2018, Charu Mehra was supposed to join the series during the filming in London, however, she was unable to due to visa issues.

=== Filming ===
Bhangra (dance) with Vidisha Srivastava at 1500 Episode Celebration

Based on the backdrop of Delhi, the series is mainly filmed in Andheri, Mumbai. Some sequences were filmed abroad, including in Adelaide, Budapest and London.

== Spin-off ==
Yeh Hai Chahatein premiered on 19 December 2019, replacing Yeh Hai Mohabbatein. It focuses on Ishita's niece Preesha Khurana (Sargun Kaur Luthra) opposite Abrar Qazi as Rudraksh Khurana.

The story revolves around a famous rockstar, Rudraksh Khurana, and a gynaecologist, Dr Preesha Srinivasan who fall in love after raising their respective siblings' son together.

== Awards and nominations ==
Year	Award	Category	Recipient	Result
2014	Gold Awards	Best Actress In Lead Role (Popular)	Divyanka T Dahiya	Nominated
2014	Gold Awards	Best Actor In Lead Role (Popular)	Karan Patel	Won
2014	Gold Awards	Best Actress In Negative Role (Popular)	Anita H Reddy	Won
2014	Indian Telly Awards	Most Popular Child Artiste (Female)	Ruhanika Dhawan	Won
2014	Indian Telly Awards	Most Popular Actress In A Lead Role	Divyanka Tripathi Dahiya	Won
2014	Indian Telly Awards	Most Popular Actor In A Lead Role	Karan Patel	Nominated
2014	Indian Telly Awards	Most Popular Onscreen Couple	Karan Patel and Divyanka Tripathi Dahiya	Won
2014	Indian Television Academy Awards	GR8! Onscreen Couple Of The Year	Karan Patel and Divyanka Tripathi Dahiya	Nominated
2014	Big Star Entertainment Awards	Most Entertaining Actress In Lead Role	Divyanka Tripathi Dahiya	Won
2015	Gold Awards	Best Actor In Lead Role (Popular)	Karan Patel	Won
2015	Gold Awards	Best Actress In Lead Role (Popular)	Divyanka Tripathi Dahiya	Won
2015	Gold Awards	Best Actress In Negative Role (Popular)	Anita Hassanandani Reddy	Won
2015	Gold Awards	Best Actor In Negative Role (Popular)	Sangram Singh	Nominated
2015	Gold Awards	Best Actor In Negative Role (Critics)	Sangram Singh	Won
2015	Gold Awards	Best Actor In Supporting Role (Popular)	Raj Singh Arora	Won
2015	Gold Awards	Best TV Show of the Year (Fiction)	Ekta Kapoor	Won
2015	Indian Telly Awards	Best Actor In Lead Role	Karan Patel	Won
2015	Indian Telly Awards	Best Actress In Lead Role	Divyanka Tripathi Dahiya	Nominated
2015	Indian Telly Awards	Best Onscreen Jodi (Popular)	Karan Patel & Divyanka Tripathi Dahiya	Won
2015	Indian Television Academy Awards	Best Romantic Actor (Male)	Karan Patel	Won
2015	Indian Television Academy Awards	Best Actor In Negative Role (Female)	Anita Hassanandani Reddy	Won
2015	Asian Viewers Television Awards	Male Actor of the Year	Karan Patel	Nominated
2015	Asian Viewers Television Awards	Female Actor of the Year	Divyanka Tripathi Dahiya	Won
2015	Asian Viewers Television Awards	Soap of the Year	Ekta Kapoor	Won
2016	Gold Awards	Best Actor (Popular)	Karan Patel	Won
2016	Gold Awards	Best Actress (Popular)	Divyanka Tripathi Dahiya	Won
2016	Gold Awards	Best Actor In Supporting Role (Male)	Raj Singh Arora	Won
2016	Gold Awards	Best Actress In A Negative Role	Anita Hassanandani Reddy	Won
2016	Gold Awards	Best Actor In A Negative Role	Sangram Singh	Won
2016	Gold Awards	Best Onscreen Jodi	Karan Patel and Divyanka Tripathi Dahiya	Nominated
2016	Asian Viewers Television Awards	Female Actor of the Year	Divyanka Tripathi Dahiya	Nominated
2017	Gold Awards	Best Actor In Lead Role (Popular)	Karan Patel	Won
2017	Gold Awards	Best Actress In Lead Role (Popular)	Divyanka Tripathi	Won
2017	Gold Awards	Best Actress In Negative Role (Popular)	Anita Hassanandani	Won
2017	Gold Awards	Best Actor In Supporting Role	Raj Singh Arora	Nominated
2017	Gold Awards	Best Actress In A Supporting Role	Aditi Bhatia	Nominated
2017	Gold Awards	Best Actor In A Negative Role	Sangram Singh	Nominated
2018	Gold Awards	Best Actress In Lead Role (Popular)	Divyanka Tripathi	Nominated
2018	Gold Awards	Best Actor In Lead Role (Popular)	Karan Patel	Nominated
2018	Gold Awards	Best Show (Popular)	Ekta Kapoor	Nominated
2018	Gold Awards	Best Onscreen Jodi	Karan Patel and Divyanka Tripathi Dahiya	Nominated
2018	Gold Awards	Gold Producer's Honour	Ekta Kapoor	Won
2018	Indian Television Academy Awards	Best Actress (Jury)	Divyanka Tripathi	Won
2019	Indian Telly Awards	Best Actress in Lead Role (Jury)	Divyanka Tripathi	Won
2019	Indian Telly Awards	Best Actor In Lead Role Female (Popular)	Divyanka Tripathi	Nominated
2019	Indian Telly Awards	Best Actor In Lead Role Male (Popular)	Karan Patel	Nominated
2019	Indian Telly Awards	Best Jodi	Divyanka Tripathi & Karan Patel	Nominated
2019	Indian Telly Awards	Best Actor In Supporting Role Male (Popular)	Abhishek Verma	Nominated
2019	Indian Telly Awards	Best Actor In Supporting Role Female (Popular)	Aditi Bhatia	Nominated
2019	Gold Awards	Best Actress In Lead Role (Popular)	Divyanka Tripathi	Nominated
2019	Gold Awards	Best Actor In Lead Role (Popular)	Karan Patel	Nominated
2019	Gold Awards	Best Show (Popular)	Ekta Kapoor	Nominated
2019	Gold Awards	Best Onscreen Jodi	Karan Patel and Divyanka Tripathi	Nominated
2019	Gold Awards	Best Actress In Supporting Role	Anita Hassanandani	Nominated

== Reception ==
Despite first airing in the late night slot 11:00pm (IST), Yeh Hai Mohabbatein received better ratings than expected and ranked as the fourth most popular show on Star Plus. In 2014, it was moved to the 7:30pm slot replacing Saraswatichandra. Star Plus SVP marketing Nikhil Madhok stated that the move was made after audiences' feedback that a section of viewers found the 11:00pm slot too late. He further explained, "This was a show where repeat viewing the next day or viewing on online digital medium is very high. So the dual airing will not only help the existing viewers who love the show to watch it twice but also add a whole new set of viewers".

The ratings of the show saw a dip after the time jump when the writers refused to move away from the custody battles between Raman Ishita and Shagun. The show remained popular in the UK, being the most-watched Indian show there. The climax of the arc involving Ruhi and Nikhil, leading to Ananya's death, brought a sudden spike in the ratings in the first week of November 2017 (week 44) and the series secured a place amongst the Top 10 shows after almost a year off this ranking. With the Budapest arc and the focus back on the main leads, the show reached the Top 5 in the second week of November 2017 (week 45). In week 46 of the year 2017, the show further climbed to the fourth spot on the TRP chart, thus becoming the most-watched show on StarPlus. In week 47 of the year 2017, the show remained at No. 4 on the TRP charts and continued to be the most-watched show on StarPlus. The show continued to do well maintaining its No. 1 position on StarPlus in the following weeks. In week 51 of 2017, Yeh Hai Mohabbatein emerged as the most-watched show across all Hindi GECs. (General Entertainment Channels)

In week 8 of the year 2018, the show remained at No. 3 on the TRP charts and continued to be the most-watched show on STAR Plus. Timeslot change in May 2018, the show was shifted to 10:30 p.m. from 7:30 p.m. which led to a fall in TRPs. Roshni's baby arc was received poorly by fans, which led to a further downfall in TRPs. StarPlus intervened, asking the producer, Ekta Kapoor, to change the storyline of the show while also giving it a 6-month deadline to increase the ratings. Ishita's fake death drama to expose Param led to the show re-entering the top 20 shows in week 31 of the year 2018 occupying 18th place with 3889 million viewership. After the change in show timings to late night TRPs have dropped ranging from 1.2 to 1.4 mostly but had been the slot leader since then. After being unable to pull up the TRP and lack of constructive story, after a successful run of 6 years of 1800+ episodes, the show went off air on 18 December 2019, giving space to the Yeh Hain Mohabatein spin-off called Yeh Hai Chahatein.

== Adaptations ==
Language	Title	Original release	Network(s)	Last aired	Notes	Ref.
Hindi	Yeh Hai Mohabbatein ये है मोहब्बतें	3 December 2013	StarPlus	19 December 2019	Original	
Kannada	Avanu Mathe Shravani ಅವನು ಮತ್ತೆ ಶ್ರಾವಣಿ	16 June 2014	Star Suvarna	30 June 2017	Remake	
Tamil	Kalyanam Mudhal Kadhal Varai கல்யாணம் முதல் காதல் வரை	3 November 2014	Star Vijay	27 January 2017	Remake	
Bengali	Mon Niye Kachakachi মন নিয়ে কাছকাছি	12 January 2015	Star Jalsha	19 September 2015	Remake	
Malayalam	Pranayam പ്രണയം	6 July 2015	Asianet	28 April 2017	Remake	
Marathi	Nakalat Saare Ghadle नकळत सारे घडले	27 November 2017	Star Pravah	17 May 2019	Remake	
Telugu	Ennenno Janmala Bandham ఎన్నెన్నో జన్మల బంధం	18 October 2021	Star Maa	1 September 2023	Remake	
Tamil	Modhalum Kaadhalum மோதலும் காதலும்	24 April 2023	Star Vijay	21 June 2024	Remake	
Marathi	Premachi Gosht प्रेमाची गोष्ट	4 September 2023	Star Pravah	5 July 2025	Remake	
Malayalam	Ishtam Mathram ഇഷ്ടം മാത്രം	26 August 2024	Asianet	15 May 2026	Remake	
