= Manju Kapur =

Indian writer

- Born: Amritsar, Punjab, India
- Spouse: Gun Nidhi Dalmia
- Children: 3

Manju Kapur is an Indian novelist. Her first novel, Difficult Daughters, won the 1999 Commonwealth Writers' Prize, best first book, Europe and South Asia.

== Personal life ==
She is married to Gun Nidhi Dalmia; they have three children and four grandchildren, and live in New Delhi.

== Awards and honors ==
- 2011: DSC Prize for South Asian Literature, short-list, The Immigrant
- 1999: Commonwealth Writers' Prize, best first book, Europe and South Asia, Difficult Daughters

== Works ==
- Difficult Daughters, Penguin India, 1998; Faber and Faber, 1998, ISBN 978-0-571-19289-2
- A Married Woman, India Ink, 2003; Faber and Faber, 2003, ISBN 978-0-571-21568-3
- Home, Random House India, 2006, ISBN 978-81-8400-000-9; Faber and Faber, 2006, ISBN 978-0-571-22841-6
- The Immigrant, Random House, India, 2008, ISBN 978-81-8400-048-1; Faber And Faber, 2009, ISBN 978-0-571-24407-2
- Custody, Faber & Faber, 2011, ISBN 978-0-571-27402-4
- Shaping the World: Women Writers on Themselves, ed. Manju Kapur, Hay House India, 2014.
- Brothers, Penguin, UK, 2016.

== Television adaptations ==
Manju Kapur's novel "Custody" has been the basis of daily soap operas on several Indian television channels in various languages:

- Yeh Hai Mohabbatein on Star Plus in Hindi under Ekta Kapoor's production house Balaji Telefilms.
- Nakalat Saare Ghadle under Swapnil Joshi Productions and Premachi Gosht under Shashi Sumeet Productions on Star Pravah in Marathi.
- Pranayam under Sree Saran Productions and Ishtam Mathram under Souparnika Creations on Asianet in Malayalam.
- Kalyanam Mudhal Kadhal Varai and Modhalum Kaadhalum on Star Vijay in Tamil.
- Avanu Mathe Shravani on Star Suvarna in Kannada.
- Ennenno Janmala Bandham on Star Maa in Telugu.
- Mon Niye Kachakachi on Star Jalsha in Bengali.

Pardes Mein Hai Mera Dil, telecast on Star Plus, under Ekta Kapoor's production house Balaji Telefilms, is based on Manju Kapur's novel "The Immigrant".

The Married Woman, is a web series, under Ekta Kapoor's production and is available on AltBalaji, it is based on Manju Kapur's novel "A Married Woman".

== Reviews ==
- Ruth Scurr (16 April 2009). "The Immigrant by Manju Kapur: review". The Telegraph.
- Arifa Akbar (11 March 2011). "Custody by Manju Kapur". The Independent.
- Mithu Banerji (27 February 2011). "Custody by Manju Kapur – review". The Observer.

== See also ==
- List of Indian writers
