= Pranayam (TV series) =

2015 Indian Malayalam language TV series

- Genre: Soap opera
- Created by: S. Murugan
- Based on: Custody by Manju Kapur
- Developed by: Ekta Kapoor
- Written by: Dinesh Pallathu
- Story by: Manju Kapur
- Directed by: Sudheesh Sankar; Thulasidas
- Starring: Srinish Aravind; Varada; Maneesh Krishna; Naveen Arackal; Beena Antony
- Narrated by: Prof. Aliyar
- Theme music composer: S.P. Venkitesh
- Opening theme: "Hey laalaa laala..."
- Ending theme: "Naanamavunnu Meni Movunnu"
- Composer: S.P. Venkitesh
- Country of origin: India
- Original language: Malayalam
- No. of episodes: 524

Production
- Producers: S. Murugan; Saraniya Subramaniam
- Cinematography: Manisundhar; Sunil Vechoor
- Editors: Sajin C.; Soman Koodal
- Camera setup: Multi-camera
- Running time: 22 minutes
- Production company: Sree Saran Creations

Original release
- Network: Asianet
- Release: 6 July 2015 – 28 April 2017

Related
- Yeh Hai Mohabbatein

Pranayam (transl. Love) is a 2015 Indian Malayalam-language television series that was broadcast on Asianet. Srinish Aravind and Varada play the lead roles. It is the remake of Yeh Hai Mohabbatein, which aired on StarPlus. It shows the love of two different states and two different cultures. The pair was known as #SharMi on social networking sites. After Varada quit the show citing health issues, ratings tanked and the show was cancelled.

== Plot ==
Following a divorce from his unfaithful wife Kavitha, after her affair with his boss Prakash, Sharan Menon is a bitter man, but he loves his daughter, Malavika "Malu" Sharan. Lekshmi Iyer, who lives next door, also loves Malu. Unable to have children of her own, she has been unable to find a partner willing to marry an infertile woman. Kavitha and Prakash win custody of Manu, Sharan's elder son and also try to take custody of Malu from Sharan. Lekshmi and Sharan put aside their dislike of each other to marry to protect the little girl and ultimately win custody of the child. Prakash tries to take revenge, convincing Sharan that Malu is not his daughter until Lekshmi realizes what's going on and uses a DNA test to resolve Sharan's doubts.

After this, Lekshmi became the target of sexual predator Indugopan, who is the husband of Sharan's younger sister Simi. Indugopan convinces Simi that it is Lekshmi who is attracted to him, sowing discord in the family and causing Lekshmi's family to take her away. Realizing that Lekshmi is innocent, Sharan successfully plots to place Indugopan in jail for his crimes, while Prakash and Simi seek to do what they can to free him.

Meanwhile, Sharan's colleague and good friend Anand is preparing to marry after a family feud broke up his relationship with Lekshmi's cousin Ashwathy. Their friends plot to get the couple back together. A drama takes place and Anand is engaged to Ashwathy. Saraswathi, Lekshmi's mom, meets with an accident caused by Manu unknowingly. Sharan finds out that it was Manu who was responsible for the accident. Kavitha is ready to take the blame on her to protect her son. Sharan begins to support Kavitha which hurts Lekshmi a lot. She files a case against Kavitha. In the court, Sharan takes Kavitha's side. However, Lekshmi learns that Manu has done the accident and apologizes to Sharan. Sharan gives punishment to Manu by sending him to a boys' rehab centre.

Sharan plans a picnic for Lekshmi. Unfortunately Lekshmi fractures her hand and Sharan takes care of Lekshmi. Sachin, Prakash's brother, come to meet Lekshmi. Sharan fights with him as he behaves rudely with Lekshmi. Anand and Ashwathy plan to get married. However, in the register office, Anand's sister has given a letter, opposing the marriage. Everyone is puzzled as Anand has always said that he is an orphan. Ashwathy questions Sharan about the whereabouts of Anand's sister. Lekshmi secretly finds out find out Anand's sister and plans to reveal it to everyone during his marriage function. However, during the function, a big drama takes place and Anand is forced to confess that his sister is none other than Kavitha. It later turns out that it was all an elaborate plan made by Kavitha. She wanted him to acknowledge her as his sister, as he had cut all relations with her after she had betrayed Sharan and gone with Prakash.

Kavitha wanted to marry Prakash and Lekshmi's sister Aswathy wanted to marry Kavitha's brother Anand. Prakash tries to brainwash Aswathy. Kavitha and Prakash's marriage is called off. Prakash blackmails Aswathy and Aswathy marries him to save Anand. Soon Sharan's son Manu along with Kavitha also comes to them and lives with them. Kavitha tries to create troubles in Lekshmi and Sharan's love using Manu but she fail and leaves the house. Kavitha still attempts to hamper the peace of Menon family.

== Cast ==
=== Main ===
- Srinish Aravind as Sharan G Menon
- Ramya Shankar (episode 1-18) / Varada (episode 18-450)/ Dr. Divya Nair as Lekshmi Viswanatha Iyer a.k.a. Lekshmi Sharan G Menon

=== Recurring ===
- Naveen Arakkal as Prakash Varama, Kavitha's ex-partner
- Baby Sradha / Baby Megha Mahesh as Malavika (Malu), Sharan and Kavitha's daughter; Lakshmi's stepdaughter
- Master Siddharth as Manu, Sharan and Kavitha's son; Lakshmi's stepson
- Binny George as Mahima
- Maneesh Krishna as Anand, Sharan's brotherly best friend; Kavitha's brother
- Althara as Kavitha, Manu's and Malavika's mother; Sharan's ex-wife; Prakash's ex-partner
- Kottayam Rasheed as Govinda Menon, Sharan's father
- Beena Antony as Madhavi Govinda Menon, Sharan's mother
- Pratheeksha G Pradeep as Aswathy Iyer, Prakash's wife; Anand's ex-fiancé; Lekshmi's and Devika's cousin
- Adithyan Jayan as Balachandran (Balu), Devika's husband
- Jishin Mohan as Sachin Varma, Prakash's brother
- Rishi as Indu Gopan, Simi's husband
- Amrutha as Simi, Sharan's sister
- Adarsh / Vishnu V Nair as Karthik, Saran's brother
- Kailas Nath as Viswanatha Iyer, Lekshmi's father
- Anuradha Krishnamoorthy as Saraswathy Viswantha Iyer, Lekshmi's mother
- Arya Sreeram as Devika Balachandran, Lekshmi's sister
- Sabari Nath as ACP Sankar IPS
- Vandana as Shaarika, Karthik's love interest
- Aishwarya as Anand's wife
- Sini Varghese as Tanuja, Prakash's friend
- Karthika Kannan as Radhika
- Faizal Razi as Dr.Manoj
- Fawaz Zayani as Mani / Abhimanyu Raghav, Lekshmi's childhood friend; Sharan's business partner
- Vanchiyoor Praveen Kumar as Ammavan

== Reboot ==
A Malayalam language reboot titled Ishtam Mathram directed by Mohan Kupleri began airing from 26 August 2024 on Asianet and also streaming on JioHotstar. The series stars Rayjan Rajan and Mridula Vijai in lead roles. It is one of the top rated TV soap opera in Malayalam. The series ended on 15 May 2026 completing 493 episodes.
