= Premachi Gosht =

2023 Indian Marathi language TV series

- Genre: Family drama Romance
- Based on: Custody by Manju Kapur
- Developed by: Ekta Kapoor
- Directed by: Girish Vasaikar
- Starring: See below
- Theme music composer: Nilesh Moharir
- Opening theme: "Premachi Gosht" by Abhishek Telang and Sugandha Datye
- Country of origin: India
- Original language: Marathi
- No. of episodes: 598

Production
- Producers: Shashi Mittal; Sumeet Mittal
- Production locations: Mumbai, Maharashtra
- Camera setup: Multi-camera
- Running time: 22 minutes
- Production company: Shashi Sumeet Productions

Original release
- Network: Star Pravah
- Release: 4 September 2023 – 5 July 2025

Related
- Yeh Hai Mohabbatein

Premachi Gosht (transl. Story of Love) is an Indian Marathi language television drama series which aired on Star Pravah. It premiered from 4 September 2023 by replacing Rang Majha Vegla. It stars Tejashri Pradhan, Raj Hanchnale and Apurva Nemlekar. Later, Swarda Thigale replaced Tejashri as lead actress. It is an official remake of Hindi TV series Yeh Hai Mohabbatein.

== Plot ==
The Story revolves around two individual people. A dentist Mukta Gokhale is a kind hearted and caring daughter of Purushottam Gokhale and Madhavi Gokhale and Sagar Koli a businessman, son of Jayant Koli and Indra Koli, who is short-tempered and arrogant because of his past events. His wife Savani, who is gold-digger left him and their daughter Sai, go towards Sagar's boss, Harshvardhan Adhikari. Because Sagar is middle-class and can't full-fill Savani's luxurious expenses. Now the Sagar is popular businessman in the town.

Sagar always ignore Sai, who wants the love of her parents but all in vain. One day Mukta meet Sai and form lovable bond towards her. Sai also affectionate towards Mukta like a mother and daughter. For the sake of Sai, Mukta and Sagar tie the knot.

== Cast ==
=== Main ===
- Tejashri Pradhan / Swarda Thigale as Mukta Purushottam Gokhale / Mukta Sagar Koli
- Raj Hanchnale as Sagar Jayant Koli
- Apurva Nemlekar as Saavni Bhoir (formerly Koli)

=== Recurring ===
Koli family

- Ira Parwade as Sai Sagar Koli
- Umesh Ghadge as Jayant (Bapu) Koli
- Sanjeevani Jadhav as Indra Jayant Koli
- Komal Somare / Namrata Sumiraaj as Swati Jayant Koli
- Aayush Bhide as Laxman Jayant Koli (Lucky)
- Lakshmi Chaporkar as Komal Jayant Koli
- Soham Salunkhe as Aditya Sagar Koli

Gokhale family

- Yogesh Kelkar as Purushottam Gokhale
- Shubhangi Gokhale as Madhavi Purushottam Gokhale
- Madhuri Bharati as Manjiri Purushottam Gokhale / Manjiri Mayuresh Paranjape

Paranjape family

- Rushi Rajkiran as Mayuresh Paranjape
- Priya Kamble as Chaya Paranjape
- Raunak Mirchandani as Pranav Paranjape

Others

- Mrunali Shirke / Amruta Bane as Mihika Limaye / Mihika Harshvardhan Adhikari
- Rajas Sule as Mihir Bhoir
- Yash Pradhan / Aniruddha Harip as Harshvardhan Adhikari
- Bhavika Nikam as Sharmila
- Deepa Amre as Gulab
- Sanjay Shejwal as Kartik
- Mayur More as Abhishek Keni
- Amit Dolawat

== Production ==
Raj Hanchnale was chosen to portray the character of Sagar Koli, the male lead. Tejashri Pradhan, who had her last appearance in Aggabai Sasubai, returned to the screen after a hiatus of two and a half years to take on the role of Dr. Mukta Gokhale, the female lead. Apurva Nemlekar was chosen to portray Saavni, the antagonist, while Yash Pradhan was cast as Harshvardhan Adhikari, the other negative lead. Sanjeevani Jadhav was chosen to portray the character Indra Koli, while Shubhangi Gokhale was selected to portray Madhavi Gokhale.
