= Bigg Boss Agnipareeksha =

- Based on: Bigg Boss Agnipariksha
- Presented by: Reneesha Rahiman
- Judges: Ranjini Haridas; Riyas Salim; Akhil Marar
- Country of origin: India
- Original language: Malayalam
- No. of seasons: 1
- No. of episodes: 22

Production
- Production locations: Kochi, Kerala
- Running time: 45–70 minutes (approx.)
- Production company: Endemol Shine India

Original release
- Network: Asianet; JioHotstar
- Release: 15 August – 5 September 2026

Related
- Bigg Boss; Bigg Boss Agnipariksha

Bigg Boss Agnipareeksha is a spin-off and pre-show of the Indian Malayalam-language reality television show Bigg Boss. The pre-show involves selecting commoner contestants for the main show. The format of the show is based on the Telugu-language television show Bigg Boss Agnipariksha.

The show is hosted by Reneesha Rahiman with Ranjini Haridas, Riyas Salim and Akhil Marar as judges. The first season aired from 15 August 2026 to 5 September 2026 on Asianet and streaming on JioHotstar. The winners of the show, Eldho, Loletta, Shijin, Rakesh, Santhosh and Shibina entered the main house of Bigg Boss season 8.

== Host and judges ==
Former Bigg Boss contestants are participated in the show as host and judges.

=== Host ===
- Reneesha Rahiman: Television actress, first runner-up of Bigg Boss season 5

=== Judges ===
Main

- Ranjini Haridas: Television presenter, contestant of Bigg Boss season 1
- Akhil Marar: Actor, director, cricketer, politician, winner of Bigg Boss season 5
- Riyas Salim: Social media influencer, second runner-up of Bigg Boss season 4

Guest

- Veena Nair: Actress, producer, politician, contestant of Bigg Boss season 2
- Rajith Kumar: Lecturer, public speaker, actor, contestant of Bigg Boss season 2
- Kidilam Firoz: Radio personality, television presenter, fifth runner-up of Bigg Boss season 3
- Firoz Khan: Actor, television presenter, contestant of Bigg Boss season 3
- Suchithra Nair: Actress, Dancer, contestant of Bigg Boss season 4
- Akhil Kutty: Actor, comedian, contestant of Bigg Boss season 4
- Nadira Mehrin: LGBTQ+ activist, Journalist, actress, contestant of Bigg Boss season 5
- Cerena Ann Johnson: Model, Miss Queen Kerala 2022 winner, contestant of Bigg Boss season 5

== Contestants ==
A total of 40 contestants participate in the show.

- Pooja Sharath – Housewife
- Shibina – Model
- Aradhya Tiya Antony – Model
- Biju Thomas - Makeup artist
- Sabira Shareef – Model
- Eldho George - Teacher, politician
- Abhiram – Gym trainer
- Parvathy Narayan – Makeup artist
- Shijin S - Dance coach
- Rasha Palathinkal – Model, influencer, social worker
- Shano Thomas – Model, software engineer
- Aziya Nowrin – Model, businesswoman
- Varsha Anna Viji – Singer, emcee
- Amal Mohan C – Freelancer
- Anagha Chandran – Radio jockey
- Nayana Balakrishnan – Model, anchor
- Aparna Suresh – IT professional
- Rachana S – HR consultant
- Pranav S – Graphic designer, Kalari coach
- Amritha S – Advocate
- Afiyanaz AN – Corporate manager
- Alakananda – HR manager
- Jetty P Thomas – Nurse
- Loletta Loryne Rodrigues – Student
- Nandakishor Siv – Advocate
- Nithin S Das – Gym trainer
- Pooja J – Designer
- Praveen Mohan – Mentor, trainer
- Raibin Raphel – Model
- Rakesh Jacob – Carpenter
- Rijo Johnson – Cabin crew
- Shamon Shajahan – Ambulance driver
- Shiju Lal – Labourer
- Shinjith Babu – Film enthusiast
- Shyam Shaji – Former accountant
- Sona Alex – Influencer
- Soni Azeem – Housewife
- Stinia Figarado – Student
- Santhosh Raj – Digital strategist
- Vishakh Vadassery – Hospital administrator

== Contestant Status ==
Name	District	Status	BBMS8	Episode
Shijin S	Thiruvananthapuram	Selected	EPI 1- PRESENT	BBS8 E1
Eldho George	Ernakulam	Selected	EPI 1- 36	BBS8 E1
Loletta Loryne Rodrigues	Thrissur	Selected	EPI 1- 28	BBS8 E1
Rakesh Jacob	Ernakulam	Selected	EPI 1- 28	BBS8 E1
Santhosh Raj	Kollam	Selected as Wild card	EPI 7- PRESENT	BBS8 E9
Shibina	Kannur	Selected as Wild card	EPI 7 - 21	BBS8 E9
Pooja Sarath	Thrissur	Runner-up		BBS8 E1
Shiju Lal	Wayanad	Runner-up		BBS8 E1
Shyam Shaji	Ernakulam	Runner-up		BBS8 E1
Afiyanaz A N	Ernakulam	Runner-up		BBS8 E1
Shamon Shajahan	Idukki	Runner-up		BBS8 E1
Sona Alex	Kottayam	Runner-up		BBS8 E1
Amritha S	Kollam	Eliminated		9
Pranav S	Thiruvananthapuram	Eliminated		9
Alakananda	Kozhikode	Eliminated		9
Vyshak Vadassery	Thrissur	Eliminated		9
Rachana S	Palakkad	Eliminated		8
Praveen Mohan	Malappuram	Eliminated		8
Shinjith Babu	Kozhikode	Eliminated		8
Parvathy Narayan	Thiruvananthapuram	Eliminated		8
Aparna Suresh	Kozhikode	Eliminated		7
Nayana Balakrishnan	Malappuram	Eliminated		7
Raibin Raphel	Thrissur	Eliminated		7
Abhiram	Malappuram	Eliminated		7
Sabira Shareef	Kannur	Eliminated		6
Soni Azeem	Ernakulam	Eliminated		6
Rijo Johnson	Wayanad	Eliminated		6
Navin Joy Thattil	Thrissur	Eliminated		6
Jetty Thomas	Malappuram	Eliminated		
Varsha Anna Viji	Alappuzha	Eliminated		5
Stiniya Figarado	Ernakulam	Eliminated		5
Shano Thomas	Idukki	Eliminated		5
Nandakishore	Palakkad	Eliminated		5
Anagha Chandran	Thrissur	Eliminated		4
Amal Mohan	Palakkad	Eliminated		4
Aziya Nowrin	Ernakulam	Eliminated		4
Pooja J	Palakkad	Eliminated		4
Aradhya Tiya Antony	Thiruvananthapuram	Eliminated		3
Nithin Das	Ernakulam	Eliminated		3
Biju Thomas	Thrissur	Eliminated		3
Rasha Palathinkal	Malappuram	Eliminated		3

== Production ==
The show was officially unveiled through a promotional teaser released on 21 May 2026, coinciding with Mohanlal's birthday. The contestants are asked to send their introduction video on the official website. Out of this, selected 40 contestants will compete for entry to Main House. Asianet has officially announced the grand launch on 15 August 2026.

== Broadcast ==
The show aired from 15 August 2026 to 5 September 2026 on Asianet and JioHotstar for 22 episodes.
