= Bigg Boss (Malayalam TV series) =

Indian Malayalam language reality television show in Asianet

- Show's eight season Logo with host Mohanlal
- Presented by: Mohanlal
- Country of origin: India
- Original language: Malayalam
- No. of seasons: 8
- No. of episodes: 667

Production
- Production location: Lonavala; EVP Film City; Goregaon Film City
- Camera setup: Multi-camera
- Production company: Endemol India

Original release
- Network: Asianet
- Release: 24 June 2018 – present

Related
- Bigg Boss; Big Brother; Malayalee House

Bigg Boss, a Malayalam-language television reality show in India, is part of the Bigg Boss franchise produced by Endemol Shine India (owned by Banijay). It airs on Asianet and streams on JioHotstar. It is based on the Dutch reality show Big Brother. Launched as part of Asianet's 25th-anniversary celebrations, the show has been hosted by Mohanlal since its inception. From Season 5 onwards, commoners selected from the public are also been featured as contestants.

== Overview ==
=== The 'Bigg Boss' house ===
A bespoke Bigg Boss house is constructed for each season. For the initial season, the house was situated in Lonavala, Maharashtra, where the Hindi version of Bigg Boss typically takes place. Anticipating scheduling conflicts with other regional language editions, the house for seasons 2, 3, and 6 was established at EVP Film City in Chennai. For the 4th and 5th seasons, the house was located at Goregaon Film City. Following the conclusion of a season, the house is either retained for the next season and opened to the public as an attraction or completely dismantled. The seventh season introduced a new house built exclusively for the Malayalam version, thereby establishing a permanent location in Chennai.

The house is meticulously furnished and decorated, featuring modern amenities and a spacious, communal bedroom accommodating all contestants. Commencing in the sixth season, a sumptuous private suite was added for the house captain and the newly implemented power team. The house also includes shared toiletries, a swimming pool, a gymnasium, and expansive gardens. Additionally, show-specific activity areas and a soundproof room with controlled access, known as the "confession room," are constructed within the house. In this room, housemates are summoned by Bigg Boss for nomination procedures and other interactive activities. Starting with season 4, a secret room equipped with a bed and other facilities was incorporated into the house. Selected evicted contestants might be retained in this room for a week or two before being reintroduced to the game.

The house is intentionally isolated from external influences, lacking television access (except for interactions with the show host, Mohanlal), telephones, internet connectivity, clocks, and writing materials, adhering to the global Big Brother franchise guidelines.

=== Rules ===
While the complete ruleset has not been publicly disclosed, certain key regulations are evident. All housemates are required to communicate exclusively in Malayalam, with minimal English usage permitted. The house property, including electronic equipment and furnishings, must be treated with care and preserved in its original condition. Housemates are not allowed to leave the house premises without explicit permission. Daytime sleep is prohibited, and contestants are only permitted to rest when the house lights are extinguished at night. Alcohol is strictly forbidden, and housemates with smoking habits may only indulge in this activity within designated smoking areas. Physical aggression towards fellow housemates is strictly prohibited, and any violations of this rule will result in immediate elimination from the competition.

=== Nomination ===
Nominations are a mandatory procedure typically conducted on the first day of the week. All housemates are required to participate unless otherwise instructed by Bigg Boss. Each housemate must nominate two other housemates for eviction. Housemates receiving the highest number of nomination votes will be placed on the nomination list for that week and face public voting via Disney+ Hotstar. On the weekend episode, the contestant with the lowest public votes will be evicted from the house. Additionally, the week's captain may directly nominate a housemate for eviction, or Bigg Boss may nominate a housemate for other reasons. Sometimes, the housemates may be nominated for other reasons, such as nomination by a person who has achieved special privileges (via tasks or other things), for breaking rules, or something else. If something very serious happens, a contestant may be evicted immediately. Housemates who have been granted immunity cannot be nominated by other contestants. Immunity is automatically bestowed upon the week's captain and can be earned by contestants through successful completion of specific tasks or secret missions assigned by Bigg Boss. In certain circumstances, the captain may make a contestant immune from nomination at Bigg Boss's discretion. Housemates are strictly prohibited from discussing nominations or the nomination process with one another.

=== House captaincy ===
A captain is appointed each week by Bigg Boss through designated tasks or elected by the housemates. The captain enjoys enhanced privileges, including immunity from nomination for the week, exemption from task participation. During their captaincy week, the captain is exempt from the nomination process and possesses the authority to either nominate a housemate directly, grant immunity to a housemate, or rescue a nominated housemate, contingent upon Bigg Boss's directives. The captain's primary responsibility is to oversee the weekly task, ensuring that the conditions and stipulations are adhered to and the task is executed effectively to secure the 'luxury budget' for the following week. Additionally, captains are expected to monitor adherence to house rules and may impose penalties on housemates who violate these regulations.

=== Broadcast ===
Bigg Boss Malayalam is aired on Asianet channel since its first season. Each weekday episode provides a recap of the previous day's events within the house. On weekends (Saturday and Sunday), the show features a comprehensive discussion between the host, Mohanlal, and the housemates, reviewing the week's highlights and culminating in a discussion about the upcoming elimination. Since Season 4, Bigg Boss has been available for live streaming on Disney+ Hotstar through a subscription. Additionally, viewers can stream episodes and participate in contestant elimination voting via the Disney+ Hotstar app.

== Series overview ==
Series	Host	Location(s)	Episodes	Originally released			Housemates	Days	Prize Money	Winner	Runner up
Series	Host	Location(s)	Episodes	First released	Last released	Network	Housemates	Days	Prize Money	Winner	Runner up
1	Mohanlal	Lonavala	99	24 June 2018	30 September 2018	Asianet & JioHotstar	18	98	₹1 crore (US$110,000)	Sabumon Abdusamad	Pearle Maaney
2	Mohanlal	Chennai	76	5 January 2020	20 March 2020	Asianet & JioHotstar	23	75	NA	Cancelled due to COVID-19	Cancelled due to COVID-19
3	Mohanlal	Chennai	96	14 February 2021	20 May 2021 1 August 2021	Asianet & JioHotstar	18	95	₹75 lakh (US$80,000)	Manikuttan	Sai Vishnu
4	Mohanlal	Mumbai	99	27 March 2022	3 July 2022	Asianet & JioHotstar	20	98	₹50 lakh (US$53,000)	Dilsha Prasannan	Muhammad Diligent Blesslee
5	Mohanlal	Mumbai	99	26 March 2023	2 July 2023	Asianet & JioHotstar	21	98	₹50 lakh (US$53,000)	Akhil Marar	Reneesha Rahiman
6	Mohanlal	Chennai	99	10 March 2024	16 June 2024	Asianet & JioHotstar	25	98	₹50 lakh (US$53,000)	Jinto Bodycraft	Arjun Syam Gopan
7	Mohanlal	Chennai	99	3 August 2025	9 November 2025	Asianet & JioHotstar	25	98	₹42.55 lakh (US$45,000)	Anumol RS	Aneesh Tharayil
8	Mohanlal	Chennai	99	6 September 2026	13 December 2026	Asianet & JioHotstar	28	98	₹30 lakh (US$32,000)	TBA	TBA

== Controversies ==
=== Season 2 ===
Second season contestant Rajith Kumar ejected from the show after attacking co-contestant Reshma by applying Chilli paste in her eyes during a task. This led to fans of Kumar posting on social media, defending him.

=== Season 3 ===
On Day 58, Wildcard entrants Sajina and Firoz Khan were expelled from the show for making inappropriate statements about women to engaging in ugly fights.

=== Season 4 ===
Fourth season contestant Dr Robin Radhakrishnan got expelled from the show after assaulting inmate Riyas.

=== Season 5 ===
- During a weekend episode, contestant Akhil Marar was reprimanded by Mohanlal for a humiliating comment he made about Madhu, who was lynched in Attapadi over accusations of stealing food. Marar apologized, and the issue was resolved.
- This season of the show was marked by another controversy involving contestant Aniyan Midhun. He shared a personal story about being in love with a lady soldier named Sana in the Indian Army. This narrative drew significant criticism from the audience, leading to him later apologizing for fabricating the story.

=== Season 6 ===
- On Day 16, there was a physical altercation between contestants Asi Rocky and Sijo John, resulting in Rocky being ejected from the show.
- The Kerala High Court has stepped into the debate regarding the broadcast of violent scenes on the show. A panel of judges has instructed the central government to take immediate action on this matter.
- Season 5 winner Akhil Marar raised concerns when wildcard contestant Sibin left the Bigg Boss house citing health problems. Marar accused the medical team of potentially administering antidepressant drugs to a mentally stable contestant, with the alleged intention of rendering him unfit to compete. Additionally, Marar made broader allegations suggesting that the Bigg Boss team might have engaged in inappropriate behaviour (casting couch) towards female contestants in previous seasons. However, no evidence has surfaced to substantiate these claims, and the Bigg Boss team has not provided any clarification regarding these incidents.

==== Shanavas’s Remarks About Contestants’ Dressing ====
The contestant Shanavas Shanu drew significant backlash for his comments about the clothing choices of fellow housemate Gizele Thakral.

Shanavas publicly advised Gizele to “dress modestly,” claiming that presenting herself in a more conservative manner would help her win love and votes from the Malayali audience.

He also faced criticism for making covertly judgmental remarks, which many interpreted as slut-shaming. Netizens called him out for patriarchal attitudes, with some labeling him a “kulapurushan” (translated roughly as “caste or moral guardian”).The remarks triggered a significant debate about gender norms, body autonomy, and conservative values being imposed on women within the premises of a reality show.

==== Homophobic Remarks Against Adhila and Noora ====
The wildcard entrants Lakshmi and Mastani faced strong public backlash for making discriminatory remarks about contestants Adhila and Noora, who are a same-sex couple.

Lakshmi, during a weekly task, made comments perceived as derogatory towards the couple’s sexuality. The situation escalated further when her mother, during an interaction featured on the show, made additional remarks that viewers considered homophobic.

Shortly afterward, fellow wildcard entrant Mastani made similar statements, accusing the couple of "normalizing LGBTQ culture" and expressing openly hostile views toward their relationship.

Host Mohanlal addressed the issue on air and strongly condemned the remarks, stating that discriminatory or demeaning comments towards any community were unacceptable.

==== Allegations of Paid PR Campaigns and Vote Manipulation ====
Several media reports claimed that several contestants relied on paid public relations (PR) teams to influence public perception and online voting. It is reported that PR agencies allegedly offered services such as automated fake voting using old Android devices, trend manipulation, and large-scale online campaigning for significant fees.

Former PR workers cited in the report claimed that vote-boosting packages costing several lakhs were openly sold, raising questions about the fairness of the competition and the authenticity of viewer voting.

==== Statements from Former Contestants ====
Evicted contestant Jishin Mohan alleged that rival PR teams used vote-splitting tactics to push him into eviction. Earlier season winner Sabumon Abdusamad stated that he won Season 1 without PR assistance, pointing out how drastically the landscape had changed. Former contestant Diya Sana also remarked that heavy PR involvement increased significantly from Season 2 onward.

==== PR Payment Admission by Season 7 Winner ====
Season 7 winner Anumol publicly confirmed that she paid an advance amount to a PR team, while denying claims of spending higher figures. She stated that PR support had become common among contestants, and maintained that her package was comparatively minimal.

==== Ethical and Fairness Concerns ====
The widespread use of paid PR services led to criticism that contestants with greater financial backing gained an unfair advantage. Critics argued that this trend distorted the nature of the show, shifting the outcome from viewer-driven results to financially driven influence.

==== Additional Allegations Involving Contestants ====
Season 7 contestant Aneesh was reported to have sold agricultural property to finance PR operations. Other contestants in previous seasons have also claimed manipulation of voting and eviction processes, though such allegations remain unverified.

=== Season 8 ===
==== Tashi Raj gets nominated for 3 weeks ====
Behaviour of contestant Tashi Raj sparked huge controversy and host Mohanlal publicly scolded him and put him in a 3 week direct nomination highest for a malayalam bigg boss contestant.

== Reception ==
Bigg Boss Malayalam – Season-wise Reception
Season	Year	Premiere TRP	Finale TRP	Average Weekly TRP	OTT Watch Time	Notes
1	2018	10.33 TVR	15.0 TVR	~7.5 TVR	–	
2	2020	11.3 TVR	Cancelled due to COVID-19	~8.0 TVR	–	
3	2021	~11 TVR	17.41 TVR	~7.5—8.5 TVR	–	
4	2022	10.14 TVR	15.19 TVR	6.3–9.27 TVR	–	
5	2023	11.72 TVR	13.97 TVR	5.17–7.17 TVR	–	
6	2024	10.75 TVR	18.00 TVR	8.00–10.51 TVR	–	Second Most watched season
7	2025	15.3 TVR	22 (SD+HD); 18.77 TVR	12.5 TVR	136 Million hours	Most-watched season.
8	2026	11.2 TVR	TBA	TBA	TBA	

== Awards ==
An academic Television studies article about Big Boss Malayalam reality show, 'Malayalikalude Bigboss Jeevitham' written by Sajith M.S. published on Madhyamam Weekly won Kerala State Television Awards 2022 for Best Television Article.

== Spin-off ==
Bigg Boss Agnipareeksha is a pre-show of the main Bigg Boss. It will feature contestants from selected commoners to earn their spot in the main house. The show premiered on 15 August 2025 ahead of the eighth season.

== Companion shows ==
=== BB Café ===
BB Café is an review based show about the reality television series Bigg Boss Malayalam. It was introduced during the second season, hosted by Rajesh Keshav and Gopika. It discussed the events from the Bigg Boss house and was accompanied by BB Café Live, a 30-minute programme streamed on Asianet's YouTube channel that featured viewers' comments and reactions.

It returned for the third season providing discussions and updates on the events inside the house. Unlike previous season, it is also telecasted on TV channel Asianet. It was the last season of the show.

=== Line Cut with Anjana Nambiar ===
Line Cut with Anjana Nambiar is an Indian Malayalam-language Television talk show with evicted housemates of reality television series Bigg Boss Malayalam. It is hosted by Anjana Nambiar. It was introduced in the seventh season, as a digital talk show features evicted housemates interview. From eighth season, it is expanded to Television format also.

=== People's Parliament ===
People's Parliament is a public discussion programme associated with the eighth season. It is organised by JioHotstar and Red FM, the programme provides a platform for young people to express their opinions and perspectives. The first edition premiered on Asianet on 11 October 2026, with selected opinions are featured on the Bigg Boss Malayalam stage. A subsequent edition was scheduled to be held at Government Women's College, Thiruvananthapuram, on 14 October 2026.
