= Bigg Boss (Malayalam TV series) season 5 =

Fifth Season of television series

Bigg Boss
- Season 5
- Presented by: Mohanlal
- No. of days: 99
- No. of housemates: 21
- Winner: Akhil Marar
- Runner-up: Reneesha Rahiman
- No. of episodes: 99

Release
- Original network: Asianet; Disney+ Hotstar
- Original release: 26 March – 2 July 2023

Series chronology
- ← Previous; Season 4 Next → Season 6

The fifth season of the Malayalam-language version of Indian reality television series Bigg Boss is produced by Endemol Shine India and Banijay. It is broadcast on Asianet along with a 24x7 deferred stream on Disney+ Hotstar OTT platform. The season is hosted by Mohanlal for the fifth consecutive year and launched on 26 March 2023. A commoner from the general public was selected as a contestant for the first time in the series by the title sponsor Airtel.

Akhil Marar won the title of Season 5 at the grand finale of the show, which was scheduled for July 2, 2023, with Reneesha Rahiman finishing as the runner-up.

== Production ==
Asianet revealed the official promo video with the new Bigg Boss Malayalam Season 5 logo on February 16, 2023. The logo of season five is different from the logos of previous seasons. It features a golden texture and grade, with this year's eye being a gem surrounded by rubies. The number 5 in the new logo denotes the fifth season. Additionally, the logo has an orange background, which is different from the previous blue background. Asianet also released the official video teaser on March 9, 2023 In the teaser, show host Mohanlal reveals the theme of this season's Bigg Boss, which is "Battle of the Originals- തീ പാറും!".

=== House theme ===
The season 5 Bigg Boss house was set up in Mumbai Film City. The BB house was designed and conceptualized by the film director Omung Kumar. The Bigg Boss mansion draws inspiration from Kerala's tharavadu architecture, featuring pillars, mural art, and a front elevation reminiscent of traditional houses. The main door resembles an old warship, adorned with 3D cannon projections. Throughout the house includes artwork, such as the Ardhanari design, 3D bulls, and war elephants. It also includes a chit-chat corners, a garden area with a pool and gym, and a jail with nearby seating. The living area's lotus-patterned flooring, animal-themed paintings, and separate wooden seats replace the traditional long couch. The dining area has a 16-seater table, animal skin-designed cushion covers, and a fish-shaped chandelier. The kitchen showcases a traditional touch with hanging chapati and artworks. The bedroom's walls feature Kathakali face drawings and eerie 3D designs. This season, there are no separate rooms for men and women. The confession room features war-themed decor, while the washroom area embraces a greenhouse theme with bamboo and plant designs. The seating arrangement exhibits an eye design reminiscent of the Bigg Boss eye surrounded by straws, akin to a traditional temple procession's alavattam.

== Housemates status ==
Sr	Housemate	Day entered	Day exited	Status
1	Akhil	Day 0	Day 99	Winner
2	Reneesha	Day 0	Day 99	1st Runner-up
3	Junaiz	Day 0	Day 99	2nd Runner-up
4	Sobha	Day 0	Day 99	3rd Runner-up
5	Shiju	Day 0	Day 99	4th Runner-up
6	Cerena	Day 0	Day 97	Evicted
7	Nadira	Day 0	Day 94	Walked
8	Aniyan	Day 0	Day 91	Evicted
9	Rinosh	Day 0	Day 83	Hospitalized
9	Rinosh	Day 0	Day 90	Walked
10	Vishnu	Day 0	Day 83	Evicted
11	Anu	Day 34	Day 70	Evicted
12	Sagar	Day 0	Day 63	Evicted
13	Sruthi	Day 0	Day 55	Evicted
14	Anjuz	Day 0	Day 49	Evicted
15	Omar	Day 24	Day 42	Evicted
16	Maneesha	Day 0	Day 35	Evicted
17	Sreedevi	Day 0	Day 35	Evicted
18	Aiswarya	Day 0	Day 29	Walked
19	Gopika	Day 0	Day 25	Evicted
20	Angeline	Day 0	Day 21	Evicted
21	Hanan	Day 15	Day 18	Walked

== Housemates ==
The participants are given below in the order of their entrance into the Bigg Boss House.

=== Original entrants ===
- Reneesha Rahiman – Malayalam TV actress known for her role as Swathi in the serial Seetha Kalyanam.
- Rinosh George – Singer-songwriter, rapper and actor.
- Cerena Ann Johnson – A Dubai born MBA student, model and Miss Queen Kerala 2022 winner.
- Sobha Viswanath – An entrepreneur, fashion designer and the founder of a clothing line – Weaver's Village.
- Sagar Surya – Film and TV actor known for Thatteem Mutteem and Kuruthi.
- Vishnu Joshi – Fitness trainer and model. He had won Mr. Kerala 2017, Mr. Ernakulam in both 2017 and 2019.
- Angeline Mariya – A film actress and the youngest out of the 18 contestant.
- Sreedevi Menon (Devu) – A single mother who is a social media influencer known as 'Viber Good Devu' and a travel vlogger.
- Junaiz VP – YouTuber, and content creator.
- Akhil Marar – A social media influencer, director of movie Oru Thathvika Avalokanam.
- Anjuz Rosh – TV actress and VJ.
- Maneesha K S – Malayalam singer and actress known for Thatteem Mutteem.
- Aniyan Midhun – Wushu Practitioner.
- Nadira Mehrin – Journalist and actress who belongs to the transgender community. She is the LGBTQ+ community representative of this season.
- Aiswarya Suresh (Lachu)– A South African born Indian model, dancer and actress. She is known for her role in Thinkalazhcha Nishchayam.
- Shiju Abdul Rasheed – Film and TV actor.
- Sruthi Lakshmi – Film and TV actress. She debuted as a child actress on the Asianet TV series, Nizhalukal.
- Gopika Gopi – A single mother who is a courier agency employee (commoner contest winner – selected from the public).

=== Wildcard entrants ===
- Hanan Hameed – Social media influencer.
- Omar Lulu – Film director.
- Anu Joseph – Film and TV actress, known for Karyam Nissaram and Minnukettu.

== Guest appearances ==
Week(s)	Day(s)	Guest(s)	Purpose of Visits
Week 1	Day 0	Mohanlal	To introduce the season 5 Bigg Boss house.
Week 3	Day 20	Mohanlal	To celebrate Vishu with the housemates.
Week 8	Day 50	Rejneesh VR, Revathy and four other YouTube Vloggers.	BB Press meet.
Week 8	Day 50–53	Robin Radhakrishnan (Season 4 Contestant)	Challengers as Guests in the Weekly Task; BB Hotel.
Week 8	Day 50–54	Rajith Kumar (Season 2 Contestant)	Challengers as Guests in the Weekly Task; BB Hotel.
Week 8	Day 56	K. Madhavan	To Honour Mohanlal on his birthday. (On Stage)
Week 8	Day 56	Arya Satheesh (Season 2 Contestant)	Co-Host Mohanlal's birthday special episode. (On Stage)
Week 8	Day 56	Sujatha Mohan, Dileep, Prithviraj Sukumaran, Jayaram, Asif Ali, Honey Rose, Mamtha Mohandas, Suraj Venjaramoodu, Manju Warrier, Rajith Kumar	Video wishes for Mohanlal's birthday episode. (Video)
Week 8	Day 56	Pallavi Ratheesh (Star Singer Juniors Season 3 winner)	Mohanlal's birthday mashup performance. (On stage)
Week 9	Day 62	Lal	Promotion of the Disney+ Hotstar web series Kerala Crime Files. (On stage)
Week 9	Day 62	Aju Varghese	Promotion of the Disney+ Hotstar web series Kerala Crime Files. (On stage)
Week 10	Day 64–67	Firoz Khan (Season 3 Contestant)	Challengers.
Week 10	Day 64–67	Riyas Salim (Season 4 Contestant)	Challengers.
Week 12	Day 81	Gautham	As life guard in the Ticket To Finale Task 3 (Underworld)
Week 13	Day 86-89	Guest(s) / Contestant(s) / Relation / Day(s); Preethi Prem & Muskan / Shiju / Wife & Daughter / Day 86; Shahnas & Sruthy Sithara / Nadira / Sister & Friend / Day 86; Sunu.J.Sara & Sindhu / Cerena / Mother & Aunt / Day 87; Nilavar, Aneesh & Amlu / Reneesha / Mother, Brother & Cousin / Day 87; Rajalakshmi, Parkrithi & Prarthana / Akhil / FriendsWife & Daughters / Day 88; Russell & Abdul Gafoor / Junaiz / Brother & Friend / Day 88; Mohan & Ponnamma / Aniyan / Parents / Day 89; Vishwanath, Meenamma & Anna / Sobha / Parents & Friend / Day 89	Family Week
Week 14	Day 95–97	Aiswarya Suresh, Anu Joseph, Sruthi Lakshmi, Gopika Gopi, Hanan Hameed, Angeline Mariya, Sreedevi Menon and Aniyan Midhun	Reunion with the Finalists
Week 14	Day 96–97	Sagar Surya, Anjuz Rosh, Omar Lulu, Maneesha K.S, Vishnu Joshi and Nadira Mehrin	Reunion with the Finalists
Week 14	Day 97	Mohanlal	For the last eviction process of season 5
Week 14	Day 99	Gowry Lekshmi	Special Performance.
Week 14	Day 99	Akhil Kutty, Sooraj Thelakkad, Noby Marcose, Manju Pathrose, Rithu Manthra, Ramya Panicker	Skit. (on stage)
Week 14	Day 99	Aiswarya Suresh, Anu Joseph, Sruthi Lakshmi, Gopika Gopi, Hanan Hameed, Angeline Mariya, Sreedevi Menon, Aniyan Midhun, Sagar Surya, Anjuz Rosh, Omar Lulu, Maneesha K.S, Vishnu Joshi, Nadira Mehrin, Cerena Ann Johnson and Rinosh George	On Stage Gallery and stage performance.
Week 14	Day 99	Stephen Devassy	Special Performance and 3rd runner-up eviction process.
Week 14	Day 99	Mohanlal	To bring the remaining two housemates from the Bigg Boss house to the finale event stage.

== Weekly summary ==
Week 1	Entrances	Day 0: Reneesha Rahiman, Rinosh George, Cerena Ann Johnson, Sobha Viswanath, Sagar Surya, Vishnu Joshi, Angeline Mariya, Sreedevi Menon, Junaiz VP, Akhil Marar, Anjuz Rosh, Maneesha K S, Aniyan Midhun, Nadira Mehrin, Aiswarya Suresh, Shiju Abdul Rasheed, Sruthi Lakshmi, and Gopika Gopi entered the Bigg Boss house as Original Entrants.
Week 1	House Captain	Day 5–7: Akhil Marar was the House Captain of Week 1.
Week 1	Nominations	Day 1: Akhil, Aniyan, Cerena, Gopika, Junaiz, Rinosh, Sreedevi, Sruthi, and Vishnu were nominated for the 1st Week eviction process.
Week 1	Weekly Task	Day 2–3: Venmathil. The contestants were divided into 9 teams, each consisting of 2 members. Each team was given the task of building a wall within a frame using blocks of two different colors, blue and pink. These blocks were released from a slider at regular intervals whenever a siren sounded. The team member who accumulated the most bricks would be exempted from the nomination for the following week. Additionally, Bigg Boss introduced three golden bricks alongside the other bricks from the slider. The contestant who successfully kept the golden brick within the frame until the end of the task would also be spared from the nomination process for the next week.
Week 1	Jail	Day 4: The Housemates voted for Angeline Mariya and Rinosh George as the least performing candidates of the week, and they were sent to jail.
Week 1	Exits	Day 7: None
Week 2
Week 2	House Captain	Day 7–14: Akhil Marar was the House Captain of Week 2.
Week 2	Captaincy Task	Day 5: Akhil and Nadira were contenders for the captaincy task. Akhil Marar has won the task to became the House Captain of Week 2.
Week 2	Nominations	Day 8: Aiswarya, Angeline, Aniyan, Gopika, Reneesha, Rinosh, and Vishnu were nominated for the 2nd Week eviction process.
Week 2	Weekly Task	Day 9–10: Dance Marathon. Dancing stars. The contestants were divided into 9 pairs, with each pair assigned the role of a movie star. They were required to come on stage and dance simultaneously while their designated song was being played. Furthermore, they had to portray the assigned character convincingly from the beginning to the end of the task. Jodi No.1. The same pair had to perform a dance on stage, portraying assigned movie character jodi roles. If the other contestants didn't enjoy the performance, they had the option to press a provided buzzer to stop the performance. Additionally, the pairs were expected to stay in character throughout the entire task. At the conclusion of the task, the housemates would participate in a voting process to select the best performers.
Week 2	Jail	Day 11: The Housemates voted for Angeline Mariya and Sreedevi Menon as the least performing candidates of the week, and they were sent to jail.
Week 2	Exits	Day 14: Eviction postponed to next week
Week 3
Week 3	Entrances	Day 15: Hanan Hameed entered the show as wildcard contestant.
Week 3	House Captain	Day 16–24: Reneesha Rahman was the House Captain of Week 3.
Week 3	Captaincy Task	Day 12: Reneesha, Sagar, and Vishnu competed in the captaincy task. Sagar Surya won the task and was initially declared the House Captain for Week 3. However, following a dispute, Reneesha was ultimately assigned the position of House Captain.
Week 3	Nominations	Day 8: Aiswarya, Angeline, Aniyan, Gopika, Reneesha, Rinosh, and Vishnu were nominated for the 3rd Week eviction process.
Week 3	Weekly Task	Day 16–17: Velliyankallu. Bigg Boss divided the housemates into three categories: Sea Lords, Sea Merchants, and Pirates. When the siren sounds, the Sea Merchants can collect pearls from the activity area, which is considered the inner sea. They must then return to the garden area, which is considered the sea. The Sea Merchants have to pay pearls to the Sea Lords to enter the house. Meanwhile, both the Sea Lords and Sea Merchants have to protect their pearls from the Pirates. At the end of the task, the top two contestants with the most pearls will win the task and compete in the captaincy task. Bigg Boss shuffled the teams on the second day of the task.
Week 3	Jail	Day 18: The Housemates voted for Gopika Gopi and Vishnu Joshi as the least performing candidates of the week, and they were sent to jail.
Week 3	Exits	Day 18: Hanan Hameed walked out from the show due to health issues. Day 21: Angeline Maria was evicted from the Bigg Boss House after facing the public vote.
Week 4
Week 4	Entrances	Day 24: Omar Lulu entered the show as wildcard contestant.
Week 4	House Captain	Day 24–28: Sobha Viswanath was the House Captain of Week 4.
Week 4	Captaincy Task	Day 19: Nadira and Sobha were contenders for the captaincy task. Sobha Viswanath has won the task to became the House Captain of Week 4.
Week 4	Nominations	Day 8: Aiswarya, Aniyan, Gopika, Reneesha, Rinosh, and Vishnu were nominated for the 4th Week eviction process.
Week 4	Weekly Task	Day 26–28: Manikyakallu. A golden stone was placed on a podium in the garden area, and the housemates were given the opportunity to steal it. However, it was crucial that none of the other housemates witnessed the stealing or hiding of the stone. Later, Bigg Boss allowed the housemates to form teams and steal the stone without letting the other teams know. One of the winner will receive a nomination-free card for two weeks.
Week 4	Jail	Day 28: The Housemates voted for Sobha Viswanath and Nadira Mehrin as the least performing candidates of the week, and they were sent to jail.
Week 4	Exits	Day 25: Gopika Gopi was evicted from the Bigg Boss House after facing the public vote.
Week 5
Week 5	House Captain	Day 29–35: Akhil Marar was the House Captain of Week 5.
Week 5	Captaincy Task	Day 29: Akhil and Aniyan were contenders for the captaincy task. Akhil Marar has won the task to became the House Captain of Week 5.
Week 5	Nominations	Day 26: Aishwarya, Akhil, Anjuz, Cerena, Junaiz, Maneesha, Nadira, Sagar, Shiju, and Sreedevi were nominated for the 5th Week eviction process.
Week 5	Weekly Task	Day 30–31: Paavakooth. Dolls representing each housemate were placed inside a box, labeled with their respective names. When the buzzer sounded, the housemates had to race through a track and quickly place the dolls into slots within a dollhouse, making sure not to pick their own named dolls. In each round, the housemate whose doll arrived last in the dollhouse would be eliminated from the game. The process continued until only three dolls remained. The housemates whose names were on those remaining dolls would be declared the winners and qualified to compete in the captaincy task.
Week 5	Jail	Day 32: The Housemates voted for Nadira Mehrin and Omar Lulu as the least performing candidates of the week, and they were sent to jail.
Week 5	Exits	Day 29: Aiswarya Suresh walked out from the show due to health issues. Day 35: Maneesha KS and Sreedevi Menon were evicted from the Bigg Boss House after facing the public vote.
Week 6
Week 6	Entrances	Day 34: Anu Joseph entered the show as wildcard contestant.
Week 6	House Captain	Day 36–42: Aniyan Midhun was the House Captain of Week 6.
Week 6	Captaincy Task	Day 34: Aniyan, Sreedevi, and Vishnu competed in the captaincy task. Sreedevi Menon won the task and was initially declared the House Captain for Week 6. However, following her eviction, Aniyan was assigned the position of House Captain.
Week 6	Nominations	Day 36: Cerena, Junaiz, Reneesha, Omar, Shiju, Sobha, Sruthi were nominated for the 6th week eviction process.
Week 6	Weekly Task	Day 37–38: Mission X. Mission day 1, Bigg Boss instructed the housemates to divide themselves into two groups according to their choice, forming Team Alpha and Team Beta. The mission is as follows: after the siren sound, Team Beta is responsible for plugging in the fuse at the power station to launch the rocket, while Team Alpha's objective is to protect the power station from any fusing attempts. Mission day 2, In the given scenario, the mission has been altered. Team Alpha's goal is to launch a monkey into space, while Team Beta aims to protect the monkey by placing it inside a cage. The mission proceeds as follows: after the siren sound, Team Alpha must unlock the cage and take the monkey, while Team Beta's objective is to safeguard the monkey by preventing Team Alpha from unlocking the cage.
Week 6	Jail	Day 39: The housemates voted for Akhil, Omar, and Sobha as the least performing candidates of the week. After losing the task, Omar Lulu and Sobha Viswanath were sent to jail.
Week 6	Exits	Day 42: Omar Lulu was evicted from the Bigg Boss House after facing the public vote.
Week 7
Week 7	House Captain	Day 42–49: Shiju Abdul Rasheed was the House Captain of Week 7.
Week 7	Captaincy Task	Day 40: Anu, Shiju and Vishnu were contenders for the captaincy task. Shiju Abdul Rasheed has won the task to became the House Captain of Week 7.
Week 7	Nominations	Day 43: Aniyan, Anjuz, Cerena, Junaiz, Nadira, Reneesha and Sagar were nominated for the 7th week eviction process.
Week 7	Weekly Task	Day 44–45: Karakku company. The task lasts for 2 days, and a box is placed inside a square-shaped ring in the garden area. The ring is marked with a black rope on three sides and a red rope on one side. The box features the photos of random housemates on all four sides. To begin the game, the housemates need to select four individuals from among themselves. Once the siren sounds, the chosen four housemates have to pick up the box and hold it. Once the box is lifted, they are not allowed to put it back on the ground. If the box touches the ground after being lifted, the individuals holding the box at that time will be eliminated from the task and moved to the next week's nomination process. At intervals, a bell will ring, signaling that those holding the box should rotate it without changing their position. When the bell stops ringing, the housemates have to vote to choose one contestant whose photo is facing the red rope on the box to be eliminated from the task and moved to the nomination process. However, the contestant currently holding the box cannot be eliminated. By continuing this process, the final four contestants who successfully hold the box at the end of the 2-day period will win the task and be saved from the nomination process for the following week.
Week 7	Jail	Day 46: The housemates voted for Junaiz, Reneesha and Sagar as the least performing candidates of the week. After losing the task, Junaiz VP and Reneesha Rahman were sent to jail.
Week 7	Exits	Day 49: Anjuz Rosh was evicted from the Bigg Boss House after facing the public vote.
Week 8
Week 8	House Captain	Day 49–56: Vishnu Joshi was the House Captain of Week 8.
Week 8	Captaincy Task	Day 47: Anu, Cerena and Vishnu were contenders for the captaincy task. Vishnu Joshi has won the task to became the House Captain of Week 8.
Week 8	Nominations	Day 50: Akhil, Anu, Cerena, Junaiz, Raneesha, Sagar, Sobha, Sruthi and Vishnu were nominated for the 8th week eviction process.
Week 8	Weekly Task	Day 50–53: BB Hotel. The Bigg Boss house has been transformed into a hotel, and Bigg Boss has assigned different roles to the housemates as staff members. These roles include the Manager, Chief Chef, Assistant Chef, Security guard, Housekeeping, Waiters, Janitor, Assistant Janitor, and Entertainment Performers. Additionally, there is a bankrupted guest who is staying at the hotel, and he is required to follow the instructions given by the Manager and the Chief Chef. Surprise guests from outside will visit the hotel and provide tips to the inmates based on their satisfaction with their performance. These guests may even try to provoke the inmates. At the end of the task, the inmates who receive more tips will emerge as winners. The total points earned by the entire team will be considered as luxury points for the week.
Week 8	Jail	Day 54: The Housemates voted for Akhil Marar and Vishnu Joshi as the least performing candidates of the week, and they were sent to jail.
Week 8	Exits	Day 55: Sruthi Lakshmi was evicted from the Bigg Boss House after facing the public vote.
Week 9
Week 9	House Captain	Day 56–63: Shiju Abdul Rasheed was the House Captain of Week 9.
Week 9	Captaincy Task	Day 54: Junaiz, Sagar and Shiju were contenders for the captaincy task. Shiju Abdul Rasheed has won the task to became the House Captain of Week 9.
Week 9	Nominations	Day 57: Akhil, Junaiz, Rinosh, Sagar, Sobha and Vishnu were nominated for the 9th week eviction process.
Week 9	Weekly Task	Day 58–59: Sanmanassullavarkku Samadhanam. Bigg Boss has declared this week as a "No Fight Week." The weekly task consists of four complex tasks that test the physical and mental strength of the housemates. Successfully completing these tasks is their main target. The outcome of the tasks will affect the luxury budget and audience judgment, with winners and losers determined for each task. The challenge for the housemates is to complete all four tasks without any fights escalating out of control or exceeding the limits. The pledge for the task, which all teammates should recite together before every task, is as follows: "We promise that for the luxury budget and individual gains, we will engage in healthy competition. We will approach the competition with the full spirit of sportsmanship." In the garden area, there is a buzzer that any housemate can press if they believe another housemate is crossing the limits of behavior, leading to an immediate halt of the task. If the buzzer is pressed during a task, that specific round should be restarted. However, if the buzzer is pressed three times during a task, that particular task will be eliminated. In the event of a task being eliminated in this manner, a reduction of 25% will be made to the total luxury budget. If the housemates are unable to complete the tasks successfully without provoking or getting provoked, and if they engage in fights, there will be consequences affecting both the luxury tasks and their individual gains for the following week.
Week 9	Jail	Day 60: The housemates voted for Junaiz, Nadira and Sagar as the least performing candidates of the week. After losing the task, Nadira Mehrin and Sagar Surya were sent to jail.
Week 9	Exits	Day 63: Sagar Surya was evicted from the Bigg Boss House after facing the public vote.
Week 10
Week 10	House Captain	Day 63–70: Sobha Viswanath was the House Captain of Week 10.
Week 10	Captaincy Task	Day 61: Aniyan, Cerena and Sobha were contenders for the captaincy task. Sobha Viswanath has won the task to became the House Captain of Week 10.
Week 10	Nominations	Day 64: Akhil, Aniyan, Anu, Cerena, Junaiz, Nadira, Reneesha and Shiju were nominated for the 10th week eviction process.
Week 10	Weekly Task	Day 64–66: BB Kodathy. Bigg Boss instructed each inmate to write up to two complaints related to themselves, regarding issues they feel have not been addressed yet. They were then asked to drop the complaints in the box located in the garden area. The challengers who entered the house acted as advocates and chose interesting cases from the box to present in the BB court. Bigg Boss has listed a few interesting punishments to be given to the culprits once the verdict has been proven.
Week 10	Jail	Day 67: The Housemates voted for Akhil Marar and Junaiz VP as the least performing candidates of the week, and they were sent to jail.
Week 10	Exits	Day 70: Anu Joseph was evicted from the Bigg Boss House after facing the public vote.
Week 11
Week 11	House Captain	Day 70–77: Cerena Ann Johnson was the House Captain of Week 11.
Week 11	Captaincy Task	Day 68: Cerena, Nadira and Raneesha were contenders for the captaincy task. Cerena Ann Johnson has won the task to became the House Captain of Week 11.
Week 11	Nominations	Day 71: Akhil, Aniyan, Cerena, Reneesha, Rinosh and Shiju were nominated for the 11th week eviction process.
Week 11	Weekly Task	Day 72–75: Anubhavangal Palichakal. Housemates were asked to share their ups and downs in their lives from birth until they joined Bigg Boss, illustrating their milestones on a chart paper. During the task days, when Bigg Boss sounded the buzzer, the housemates had to gather in the garden area and choose one person to explain their story.
Week 11	Jail	Day 75: The Housemates voted for Rinosh George and Vishnu Joshi as the least performing candidates of the week, and they were sent to jail.
Week 11	Secret Room	Day 77: Cerena was moved to Secret room
Week 11	Exits	Day 77: None
Week 12
Week 12	House Captain	Day 77–84: Junaiz VP was the House Captain of Week 12.
Week 12	Nominations	Day 78: Akhil, Cerena, Junaiz, Nadira, Reneesha, Shiju and Vishnu were nominated for the 12th week eviction process.
Week 12	Ticket To Finale	Day 79–82: All the housemates need to participate in all of the tasks part of the ticket to finale. All the housemates receive points on how they play each task given. Eventually, the housemate with the most points at the end wins the ticket to the finale and enters to the finale week without getting evicted. Task 1: Pidivali, An extended rope has been provided, with each housemate assigned a distinct black area to hold. This endurance challenge spans at least 24 hours, demanding unwavering grip from participants throughout. Those grasping the rope must refrain from consuming food or beverages, as well as using restroom facilities. Disqualification awaits those who dare release their grasp during this test of fortitude. Task 2: Kuthira Panthayam, In this task, each contestant is equipped with a captivating rocking horse. The challenge spans a full 24-hour period, demanding unwavering dedication. During the task, the housemates must refrain from indulging in food, beverages, or visiting the restroom. Seated upon the rocking horse, they must maintain an uninterrupted rhythm of swinging. Failure to sustain the motion, remove both hands, or let their feet touch the ground will result in disqualification. Task 3: Underworld, There will be coins placed in the swimming pool in the garden, each bearing a picture of the housemates. After each buzzer, the housemates have to start from the jail area, jump into the pool, find their coin, and place it on the podium near the jail area. The fastest participant will earn more points. Task 4: Chithram, There were sliding picture puzzle for each housemates. After the buzzer, the housemates should try to solve the puzzle. Those who solve the puzzle before the next one will get 10 points, while those who fail will get 1 point Task 5: Glass Troubles, In this task, 10 steel cups will be given to the housemates. After the buzzer, each housemate must balance the cups on a flat board connected to a podium. The task lasts approximately 15 minutes. At the end of the buzzer, housemates will earn points based on the number of glasses they successfully balanced. Task 6: Carnival, In this task, a glassless Maruti Suzuki Alto is placed in the garden. After the buzzer, housemates must enter the car, and those who exit are eliminated. It's an endurance task, and the longest-seated participant wins.: Housemate / Ticket To Finale Tasks & Points; Housemate / Task 1 / Task 2 / Task 3 / Task 4 / Task 5 / Task 6 / Total; Akhil / 1 / 1 / 10 / 1 / 4 / 3 / 20; Aniyan / 6 / 3 / 8 / 1 / 0 / 4 / 22; Cerena / 10 / 6 / 2 / 10 / 2 / 8 / 38; Junaiz / 5 / 5 / 5 / 1 / 3 / 7 / 26; Nadira / 9 / 10 / 9 / 10 / 5 / 9 / 52; Reneesha / 2 / 7 / 4 / 1 / 4 / 5 / 23; Rinosh / 7 / 9 / 6 / 1 / 4 / 6 / 33; Shiju / 4 / 2 / 7 / 1 / 3 / 1 / 18; Sobha / 8 / 8 / 1 / 1 / 4 / 10 / 32; Vishnu / 3 / 4 / 3 / 10 / 4 / 2 / 26; Nadira Mehrin received the most points and won the ticket to the finale and got entry to the finale week.
Week 12	Exits	Day 83: Vishnu Joshi was evicted from the Bigg Boss House after facing the public vote.
Week 13
Week 13	House Captain	Day 84: Nadira Mehrin was the House Captain of Week 13.
Week 13	Nominations	Day 85: Akhil, Aniyan, Cerena, Junaiz, Reneesha, Rinosh, Shiju and Sobha were directly nominated for the 13th week eviction process.
Week 13	Exits	Day 90: Rinosh George walked out from the show due to health issues. Day 91: Aniyan Midhun was evicted from the Bigg Boss House after facing the public vote.
Week 14
Week 14	Nominations	Day 92: Akhil, Cerena, Junaiz, Nadira, Reneesha, Shiju and Sobha were nominated for the finale voting process.
Week 14	Money Box	Day 93–94: On day one, Bigg Boss placed five boxes, each containing a secret amount of money. The housemates decided the order in which the boxes would be opened. On the first day, they had the option to ask for four boxes to be opened. They had until midnight of that day to choose whether to take the money and quit the show. If no one chose to leave after midnight, the opened boxes would be sealed and removed from the task. If a housemate decided to take the money and quit, the task would be completed and the amount would be deducted from the final prize pool. Day 1 opened boxes: Box 1 / Box 2 / Box 3 / Box 4; ₹650,000 (Box 4) / ₹300,000 (Box 1) / ₹425,000 (Box 5) / ₹150,000 (Box 2); On day two, Bigg Boss placed six boxes. The order in which the boxes would be opened was determined by the housemates, with each box being opened after the sound of a buzzer. Once a box was opened, it would be sealed and removed from the task when the next buzzer sounded. If any contestant desired to take the money and quit the show, they had to make that decision before the subsequent buzzer. If a housemate decided to take the money and quit, the task would be completed and the amount would be deducted from the final prize pool. Day 2 opened boxes: Box 1 / Box 2 / Box 3; ₹350,000 (Box 2) / ₹500,000 (Box 3) / ₹775,000 (Box 6)
Week 14	Exits	Day 94: Nadira Mehrin accepted the ₹7,75,000 Money Box and walked away from the show. Day 97: Cerena Ann Johnson was evicted from the Bigg Boss House after facing the public vote.
Week 14	4th Runner up	Day 99: Shiju Abdul Rasheed (Won My G gift voucher)
Week 14	3rd Runner up	Day 99: Sobha Viswanath (Won My G gift voucher)
Week 14	2nd Runner up	Day 99: Junaiz VP (Won My G gift voucher)
Week 14	1st Runner up	Day 99: Reneesha Rahman (Won My G gift voucher)
Week 14	Winner	Day 99: Akhil Marar (Won ₹50,00,000 and Maruti Fronx Nexa)

== Nomination table ==
	Week 1		Week 2	Week 3	Week 4	Week 5	Week 6	Week 7	Week 8	Week 9	Week 10	Week 11	Week 12	Week 13	Week 14			
	Day 1	Day 5	Week 2	Week 3	Week 4	Week 5	Week 6	Week 7	Week 8	Week 9	Week 10	Week 11	Week 12	Week 13	Finale			
Nominees for Captaincy	None	Akhil; Nadira		Reneesha; Sagar; Vishnu	Nadira; Sobha	Akhil; Aniyan	Aniyan; Sreedevi; Vishnu	Anu; Shiju; Vishnu	Anu; Cerena; Vishnu	Junaiz; Sagar; Shiju	Aniyan; Cerena; Sobha	Cerena; Nadira; Reneesha	Junaiz; Nadira; Sobha	None				
House Captain	None	Akhil		~~Sagar~~	Sobha	Akhil	~~Sreedevi~~	Shiju	Vishnu	Shiju	Sobha	Cerena	Junaiz	Nadira	No; Captain			
House Captain	None	Akhil		Reneesha	Sobha	Akhil	Aniyan	Shiju	Vishnu	Shiju	Sobha	Cerena	Junaiz	Nadira	No; Captain			
BB Prison	Angeline; Rinosh		Angeline; Sreedevi	Gopika; Vishnu	Nadira; Sobha	Nadira; Omar	Omar; Sobha	Junaiz; Reneesha	Akhil; Vishnu	Nadira; Sagar	Akhil; Junaiz	Rinosh; Vishnu	None					
Vote to:	Evict/Save		Evict							Evict/Save	Evict					WIN		
Akhil	Shiju (to save)		Rinosh; Angeline	Not eligible	Not eligible	Junaiz; Aiswarya	Junaiz; Sobha	Junaiz; Reneesha	Cerena; Sagar	Nominated	Nadira; Reneesha	Aniyan; Cerena	Junaiz; Nadira	Nominated	Nominated	Finalist	Winner (Day 99)	
Reneesha	Akhil (to evict)		Angeline; Gopika	Not eligible	Nominated	Nadira; Aishwarya	Omar; Rinosh	Junaiz; Sagar	Akhil; Sagar	Saved	Aniyan; Anu	Sobha; Rinosh	Sobha; Nadira	Nominated	Nominated	Finalist	1st runner-up (Day 99)	
Junaiz	Sobha (to save)		Reneesha; Vishnu	Not eligible	Not eligible	Sreedevi; Aishwarya	Anjuz; Shiju	Anjuz; Nadira	Akhil; Reneesha	Nominated	Anu; Akhil	Reneesha; Shiju	Akhil (to evict); Sobha (to save)	Nominated	Nominated	Finalist	2nd runner-up (Day 99)	
Sobha	Vishnu (to evict)		Vishnu; Gopika	Not eligible	Not eligible	Cerena; Shiju	Reneesha; Sruthi	Anjuz; Reneesha	Akhil; Sagar	Nominated	Anu; Reneesha	Reneesha; Shiju	Reneesha; Shiju	Nominated	Nominated	Finalist	3rd runner-up (Day 99)	
Shiju	Sruthi (to evict)		Gopika; Aniyan	Not eligible	Not eligible	Cerena; Junaiz	Junaiz; Reneesha	Reneesha; Aniyan	Sagar; Sobha	Not eligible	Junaiz; Nadira	Reneesha; Cerena	Reneesha; Junaiz	Nominated	Nominated	Finalist	4th runner-up (Day 99)	
Cerena	Gopika (to evict)		Aiswarya; Gopika	Not eligible	Not eligible	Nadira; Shiju	Shiju; Sobha	Anjuz; Aniyan	Akhil; Sobha	Saved	Nadira; Anu	Aniyan	Shiju; Vishnu	Nominated	Nominated	Evicted (Day 97)		
Nadira	Aniyan (to evict)		Aniyan; Reneesha	Not eligible	Not eligible	Vishnu; Anjuz	Reneesha; Sruthi	Aniyan; Cerena	Cerena; Sobha	Saved	Anu; Junaiz	Reneesha; Rinosh	Reneesha; Junaiz	TTF; Winner	Nominated	Walked (Day 94)		
Aniyan	Maneesha (to save)		Vishnu; Angeline	Nominated	Nominated	Aishwarya; Sreedevi	Cerena; Shiju	Reneesha; Cerena	Reneesha; Sagar	Saved	Akhil; Nadira	Akhil; Shiju	Sobha; Vishnu	Nominated	Evicted (Day 91)			
Rinosh	Angeline (to save)		Vishnu; Gopika	Nominated	Nominated	Sreedevi; Cerena	Cerena; Nadira	Reneesha; Sagar	Reneesha; Sagar	Nominated	Nadira; Akhil	Nadira; Akhil	Sobha; Vishnu	Nominated	Walked (Day 90)			
Vishnu	Sreedevi (to save)		Reneesha; Gopika	Nominated	Nominated	Sreedevi; Maneesha	Sobha; Sruthi	Anjuz; Junaiz	Sagar; Sobha	Nominated	Reneesha; Nadira	Rinosh; Shiju	Sobha; Nadira	Evicted (Day 83)				
Anu	Not In House						Entered (Day 34)	Nadira; Anjuz	Akhil; Sagar	Saved	Nadira; Aniyan	Evicted (Day 70)						
Sagar	Anjuz (to save)		Reneesha; Aniyan	~~House Captain~~	Not eligible	Aniyan; Sreedevi	Shiju; Sruthi	Aniyan; Reneesha	Akhil; Reneesha	Nominated	Evicted (Day 63)							
Sruthi	Cerena (to evict)		Aiswarya; Gopika	Not eligible	Not eligible	Sreedevi; Maneesha	Omar; Reneesha	Sagar; Reneesha	Cerena; Sobha	Evicted (Day 55)								
Anjuz	Reneesha (to save)		Angeline; Rinosh	Not eligible	Not eligible	Junaiz; Nadira	Sobha; Sruthi	Junaiz; Sagar	Evicted (Day 49)									
Omar	Not In House				Entered (Day 24)	Not eligible	Shiju; Sobha	Evicted (Day 42)										
Maneesha	Sagar (to save)		Rinosh; Aiswarya	Not eligible	Not eligible	Rinosh; Aiswarya	Evicted (Day 35)											
Sreedevi	Junaiz (to evict)		Gopika; Aniyan	Not eligible	Not eligible	Anjuz; Junaiz	Evicted (Day 35)											
Aiswarya	Rinosh (to evict)		Angeline; Gopika	Nominated	Nominated	Reneesha; Cerena	Walked (Day 29)											
Gopika	Aiswarya (to evict)		Reneesha; Aniyan	Nominated	Nominated	Evicted (Day 25)												
Angeline	Nadira (to save)		Gopika; Reneesha	Nominated	Evicted (Day 21)													
Hanan	Not In House			Entered (Day 15)	Walked (Day 18)													
Notes	1, 2		3	4, 5, 6, 7, 8	9, 10, 11, 12, 13	14, 15, 16	17, 18, 19	20	21, 22, 23, 24	25, 26, 27	28	29, 30, 31, 32, 33	34, 35, 36, 37, 38	39, 40	41, 42			
Against Public Vote	Aiswarya; Akhil; Aniyan; Cerena; Gopika; Junaiz; Rinosh; Sruthi; Vishnu		Aiswarya; Angeline; Aniyan; Gopika; Reneesha; Rinosh; Vishnu		Aiswarya; Aniyan; Gopika; Reneesha; Rinosh; Vishnu	~~Aiswarya~~; Akhil; Anjuz; Cerena; Junaiz; Maneesha; Nadira; Sagar; Shiju; Sreedevi	Cerena; Junaiz; Omar; Reneesha; Shiju; Sobha; Sruthi	Aniyan; Anjuz; Cerena; Junaiz; Nadira; Reneesha; Sagar	Akhil; Anu; Cerena; Junaiz; Reneesha; Sagar; Sobha; Sruthi; Vishnu	Akhil; Junaiz; Rinosh; Sagar; Sobha; Vishnu	Akhil; Aniyan; Anu; Cerena; Junaiz; Nadira; Reneesha; Shiju	Akhil; Aniyan; Cerena; Reneesha; Rinosh; Shiju	Akhil; Cerena; Junaiz; Nadira; Reneesha; Shiju; Vishnu	Akhil; Aniyan; Cerena; Junaiz; Reneesha; Rinosh; Shiju; Sobha	Akhil; ~~Cerena~~; Junaiz; ~~Nadira~~; Reneesha; Shiju; Sobha			
Secret Room	None											Cerena	None					
Walked	None			Hanan	None	Aiswarya	None							Rinosh	Nadira	None		
Evicted	No; Eviction		Eviction Postponed	Angeline	Gopika	Sreedevi	Omar	Anjuz	Sruthi	Sagar	Anu	No; Eviction	Vishnu	Aniyan	Cerena	Shiju	Sobha	Junaiz
Evicted	No; Eviction		Eviction Postponed	Angeline	Gopika	Maneesha	Omar	Anjuz	Sruthi	Sagar	Anu	No; Eviction	Vishnu	Aniyan	Cerena	Reneesha	Akhil	

=== Notes ===
indicates the House Captain.
indicates the Nominees for house captaincy.
indicates that the Housemate was directly nominated for eviction prior to the regular nominations process.
indicates that the Housemate was granted immunity from nominations.
indicates ticket to finale winner.
indicates the winner.
indicates the first runner up.
indicates the second runner up.
indicates the third runner up.
indicates the fourth runner up.
indicates the contestant as Weak Performer of the week.
indicates the contestant has re-entered the house.
indicates the contestant has been hospitalized.
indicates that the Housemate was in the Secret Room.
indicates that the Housemate was in the Secret Room for violating Bigg Boss rules.
indicates a new wildcard contestant.
indicates the Eviction free pass has been used on a housemate.
indicates the contestant has been walked out of the show.
indicates the contestant has been evicted.

- ^Note 1 : Day 1, Bigg Boss asked housemates to save one housemate and nominate one housemate, later Akhil, Aniyan, Cerena, Gopika, Junaiz, Rinosh, Sreedevi, Sruthi, and Vishnu were nominated and Angeline, Anjuz, Maneesha, Nadira, Reneesha, Sagar, Shiju, Sobha, and Sreedevi saved.
- ^Note 2 : Day 4, Because they won the weekly task, Akhil, Cerena, Junaiz, Maneesha, Nadira, Sagar, Shiju, Sobha, Sreedevi, and Sruthi were spared nomination, however Aiswarya, Angeline, Aniyan, Anjuz, Gopika, Reneesha, Rinosh, and Vishnu were included in week 2 nomination process.
- ^Note 3 : Day 14, Due to a heated argument between candidates while Mohanlal was on stage, an enraged Mohanlal canceled the show and walked out, urging the voting line to continue as it had the previous week.
- ^Note 4 : Day 15, Bigg Boss directly nominated Akhil and Sagar for next week's eviction process due to a weekend argument and removed Sagar from the captaincy position.
- ^Note 5 : Day 15, Hanan entered the Bigg Boss house as Wildcard Contestant.
- ^Note 6 : Day 16, Bigg Boss chooses Reneesha, and she became the new captain of the house.
- ^Note 7 : Day 18, Hanan walked out from the show due to health issues.
- ^Note 8 : Day 21, The Week 3 eviction has been extended to Week 4.
- ^Note 9 : Day 24, Omar entered the Bigg Boss house as Wildcard Contestant.
- ^Note 10 : Day 25, Sruthi received a jail-free card which she can use once in the next 10 weeks.
- ^Note 11 : Day 25, Gopika was evicted after facing the public vote on the mid-week.
- ^Note 12 : Day 26, Omar was exempted from the nomination and eviction procedures.
- ^Note 13 : Day 27: After winning the task, Maneesha got the nomination free card for two weeks.
- ^Note 14 : Day 29: Aishwarya walked out from the show due to health issues.
- ^Note 15 : Day 34, Anu entered the Bigg Boss house as Wildcard Contestant.
- ^Note 16 : Day 35, Sreedevi chooses to replace herself with Aniyan as house captain for week 6 due to eviction.
- ^Note 17 : Day 36, Anu was exempted from the nomination and eviction procedures.
- ^Note 18 : Day 36, Akhil and Vishnu were spared from nomination. Vishnu was spared because they won the weekly task, while Akhil was saved since he was captain the previous week.
- ^Note 19 : Day 38, Because they won the weekly task, Akhil, Anu, Omar, Rinosh, Shiju, Sobha, Sruthi, and Vishnu were spared nomination, however Aniyan, Anjuz, Cerena, Junaiz, Nadira, Sagra, and Reneesha were included in week 7 nomination process.
- ^Note 20 : Day 45, Because they won the weekly task, Aniyan, Nadira, Rinosh, and Shiju were spared from nomination. However, Akhil, Anjuz, Cerena, Sagra, Sobha, and Reneesha were included in the week 8 nomination process. Additionally, Anu, Junaiz, Sruthi, and Vishnu were directly nominated for the eviction process.
- ^Note 21 : Day 50, Bigg Boss conducted a press meet at the activity area, where famous Malayalam YouTube vloggers participated to interview the housemates.
- ^Note 22 : Day 50, Two contestants from past seasons entered the house as guests in a weekly task to challenge the housemates.
- ^Note 23 : Day 53, Guest Robin has been ejected from the house due to the violation of Bigg Boss rules.
- ^Note 24 : Day 55, Sruthi gave her jail-free card to Reneesha.
- ^Note 25 : Day 56, Bigg Boss instructed the inmates to form teams consisting of 2–3 members each. Later, each team was called into the confession room and asked to choose one member to save from the next week's nomination process, while the rest were subjected to the nomination process.
- ^Note 26 : Day 59, After earning more points in the weekly task, Rinosh was exempted from the week 10 nomination process. However, due to having the least points in the task, Cerena and Shiju were directly nominated for eviction in the week 10.
- ^Note 27 : Day 60, Akhil was hospitalized and he returned to Bigg Boss house on Day 61.
- ^Note 28 : Day 64, Two challengers entered the house.
- ^Note 29 : Day 71, The House captain can nominate one housemate directly for the eviction process.
- ^Note 30 : Day 75, Bigg Boss announced that the jail task in week 11 was the last one for this season.
- ^Note 31 : Day 76, Bigg Boss telecasted the Malayalam movie 'Alone' for the inmates in the activity area.
- ^Note 32 : Day 77, Bigg Boss has announced that the captaincy task for Week 12 is the final captaincy task of this season.
- ^Note 33 : Day 77, To balance the female and male ratio in the Bigg Boss house, instead of eviction, Cerena was sent to the secret room until the next day and directly nominated for the Week 12 eviction process.
- ^Note 34 : Day 78, Bigg Boss announced that housemates can nominate other housemates for the eviction process for the last time in this season.
- ^Note 35 : Day 78, The house captain can save one person from the nomination list and add one person to the nomination list.
- ^Note 36 : Day 83, Nadira Mehrin won the 'Ticket to Finale' task and directly entered to the finale week.
- ^Note 37 : Day 83, Rinosh was hospitalized.
- ^Note 38 : Day 84, Housemates selected Nadira Mehrin as House Captain for Week 13.
- ^Note 39 : Day 85, Bigg Boss announced that all of the contestants, except for the winner of the 'Ticket to Finale,' Nadira, have been directly nominated for the 13th week's eviction procedure.
- ^Note 40 : Day 90, Rinosh walked out of the show due to health issues. He declared this through a video interaction with the housemates from the hospital in a weekend episode in the presence of anchor Mohanlal.
- ^Note 41 : Day 92, Bigg Boss has announced that all housemates are nominated for the voting process to determine the finale winner.
- ^Note 42 : Day 94, Nadira accepted the MONEY BOX and walked away from the show.

== Ratings and viewership ==
Official ratings are taken from BARC India.
(TRP of the episodes telecasting in Asianet only)

Grand Premiere		Grand Finale	
TRP Rating	Viewers(In Million's)	TRP Rating	Viewers(In Million's)
11.72	24.6	14.03	29.4

Weekly TRP Rating

Week 1	7.78 TRP	27 March - 31 March
Week 2	6.33 TRP	1 April - 7 April
Week 3	6.96 TRP	8 April - 14 April
Week 4	6.80 TRP	15 April - 21 April
Week 5	5.60 TRP	22 April - 28 April
Week 6	5.86 TRP	29 April - 5 May
Week 7	5.86 TRP	6 May - 12 May
Week 8	6.33 TRP	13 May - 19 May
Week 9	5.34 TRP	20 May - 26 May
Week 10	5.65 TRP	27 May - 2 June
Week 11	5.17 TRP	3 June - 9 June
Week 12	6.29 TRP	10 June - 16 June
Week 13	6.93 TRP	17 June - 23 June
Week 14	7.17 TRP	24 June - 30 June
Last Episode	7.16 TRP	1 July
