= Bigg Boss (Malayalam TV series) season 4 =

Fourth Season of television series

Bigg Boss
- Season 4
- Presented by: Mohanlal
- No. of days: 99
- No. of housemates: 20
- Winner: Dilsha Prasannan
- Runner-up: Muhammad Diligent Blesslee
- No. of episodes: 99

Release
- Original network: Asianet; Disney+ Hotstar
- Original release: 27 March – 3 July 2022

Series chronology
- ← Previous; Season 3 Next → Season 5

The fourth season of the Malayalam-language version of Indian reality television series Bigg Boss is produced by Endemol Shine India and Banijay and broadcast on Asianet along with a 24x7 deferred stream on Disney+ Hotstar OTT platform. The season is hosted by Mohanlal for the fourth consecutive year and launched on 27 March 2022.

== Production ==
The fourth season's house was set up at the Mumbai Film City. It was designed and conceptualized by the film director Omung Kumar.

== Housemates status ==
Sr	Housemate	Day entered	Day exited	Status
1	Dilsha	Day 0	Day 99	Winner
2	Blesslee	Day 0	Day 99	1st runner-up
3	Riyas	Day 41	Day 99	2nd runner-up
4	Lakshmi	Day 0	Day 99	3rd runner-up
5	Dhanya	Day 0	Day 99	4th runner-up
6	Sooraj	Day 0	Day 99	5th runner-up
7	Ronson	Day 0	Day 91	Evicted
8	Vinay	Day 42	Day 84	Evicted
9	Akhil	Day 0	Day 77	Evicted
10	Robin	Day 0	Day 69	Ejected
11	Jasmine	Day 0	Day 68	Walked
12	Suchithra	Day 0	Day 63	Evicted
13	Aparna	Day 0	Day 56	Evicted
14	Nimisha	Day 0	Day 49	Evicted
15	Daisy	Day 0	Day 35	Evicted
16	Naveen	Day 0	Day 35	Evicted
17	Aswin	Day 0	Day 28	Evicted
18	Manikandan	Day 20	Day 27	Walked
19	Shalini	Day 0	Day 21	Evicted
20	Janaki	Day 0	Day 7	Evicted

== Housemates ==
The participants in the order of appearance and entered in house are:

=== Original entrants ===
- Naveen Arakkal – television actor.
- Janaki Sudheer – film actress and model.
- Lakshmi Priya – film and TV actress.
- Dr. Robin Radhakrishnan – Doctor and Social Media Person
- Dhanya Mary Varghese – film and TV actress.
- Shalini Nair – master of ceremonies and VJ.
- Jasmine M. Moosa – fitness trainer.
- Akhil Kutty – film, TV artist, and comedian.
- Daisy David – photographer and grandniece of actress Philomina.
- Ronson Vincent – film and TV actor.
- Nimisha P S – model and Miss Kerala Pageant finalist.
- Aswin Vijay – magician and mentalist
- Aparna Mulberry – an American-Chilean English language teacher who grew up in Kerala
- Sooraj Thelakkad – actor, comedian and TV presenter.
- Muhammad Diligent Blesslee – musician and lyricist.
- Dilsha Prasannan – TV actress and dancer.
- Suchitra Nair - TV actress

=== Wildcard entrants ===
- Manikandan Thonnakkal – Malayalam teacher, Villadichampaatu performer, YouTuber, mimicry artist.
- Riyas Salim – social media influencer and engineer.
- Vinay Madhav – anchor, hotelier, chef and brother of Parvathy Nambiar

== Guests ==
Week(s)	Day(s)	Guest(s)	Purpose of Visits
Week 1	Day 0	Mohanlal	To introduce the season 4 Bigg Boss house.
Week 1	Day 1	11 YouTube Vloggers.	BB Press meet.
Week 7	Day 48	Jeethu Joseph	To promote his movie 12th man.
Week 8	Day 56	K.Madhavan	To Honour Mohanlal on his birthday.
Week 8	Day 56	Arya Satheesh (Season 2 Contestant)	Co-Host Mohanlal's birthday special episode.
Week 8	Day 56	Jayaram, Vijay Sethupathi, Manju Warrier, Vivek Oberoi, Nagarjuna, Kamal Haasan	Video wishes for Mohanlal's birthday episode. (Video)
Week 9	Day 63	Kamal Haasan	To promote his movie Vikram.
Week 14	Day 96–97	Janaki Sudheer, Manikandan Thonnakkal, Shalini Nair, Aswin Vijay, Naveen Arakkal, Nimisha P.S, Aparna Mulberry, Suchithra Nair, Jasmine M. Moosa and Robin Radhakrishnan	Reunion with the Finalists
Week 14	Day 97	Ronson Vincent and Daisy David	Reunion with the Finalists
Week 14	Day 99	Sayanora Philip, Indulekha Warrier and Warkey	Special performance.
Week 14	Day 99	Suraj Venjaramoodu, Kalabhavan Prajod, Noby Marcose, Veena Nair	Special skit.

== Weekly summary ==
Week 1	Entrances	Day 0: Naveen Arakkal, Janaki Sudheer, Lakshmi Priya, Robin Radhakrishnan, Dhanya Mary Varghese, Shalini Nair, Jasmine M Moosa, Akhil Kutty, Daisy David, Ronson Vincent, Nimisha P S, Aswin Vijay, Aparna Mulberry, Sooraj Thelakkad, Muhammad Diligent Blesslee, Dilsha Prasannan, and Suchithra Nair entered the Bigg Boss house as Original Entrants.
Week 1	House Captain	Day 1–4: Aswin Vijay was the House Captain of Week 1. Day 4–12: Naveen Arakkal was the House Captain of Week 1.
Week 1	Nominations	Day 1: Akhil, Aparna, Blesslee, Daisy, Dhanya, Dilsha, Janaki, Jasmine, Lakshmi, Naveen, Nimisha, Robin, Ronson, Shalini, Sooraj, and Suchithra were nominated for elimination by Bigg Boss himself.
Week 1	Weekly Task	Day 2–4: Akathum Porthum: A teddy bear task where contestants who get a teddy bear with special powers will be inside the house others outside the house Daisy, Naveen, and Robin had teddy bears, and Akhil, Aparna, Dilsha, Jasmin, Nimisha, and Suchithra played task and won it and they were in the house and rest outside.
Week 1	Jail	Day 4: Housemates voted Aswin and Blesslee as the least performing candidates of the week, and were sent to jail.
Week 1	Captaincy Task	Day 1: All housemates were asked to vote for three non-deserving candidates to enter the house, and Aswin, Nimisha, and Shalini received the most votes. Later Bigg boss announced the non-deserving candidates are selected for the captain task. The task was to tie hands and place more balls in the basket with their pictures on them. Aswin Vijay placed more balls and became the House Captain of Week 1. Day 4: Naveen, Ronson, and Suchithra qualified for the captaincy task. In the garden area, three pillars were built. Different sand-filled bags (assumed to be lizards inside) were placed beside them. The goal was to keep these sacks resting on the pillars' small circular branches. Naveen Arakkal was elected captain after successfully making the majority of his sacks to the branch.
Week 1	Saved contestants	Day 6–7: Akhil, Aparna, Blesslee, Daisy, Dhanya, Dilsha, Jasmine, Lakshmi, Naveen, Nimisha, Robin, Ronson, Shalini, Sooraj, and Suchithra were declared safe from Week 1 Eviction.
Week 1	Exits	Day 7: Janaki Sudheer was evicted from the Bigg Boss House after facing the public vote.
Week 2
Week 2	Entrances	Day 14: None
Week 2	House Captain	Day 4–12: Naveen Arakkal was the House Captain of Week 2.
Week 2	Nominations	Day 8: Aswin, Blesslee, Daisy, Dilsha, Jasmin, Nimisha, Robin, and Ronson were nominated for the 2nd Week eviction process.
Week 2	Luxury Budget Task	Day 9–10: The Luxury Budget Task is called Bhagya Petakam. A task in which the contestants sit on a spaceship without drinking water or eating anything. The person who survives the longest wins. Blesslee was announced the winner after completing a record 24.5 hrs spent on the spaceship and won immunity from next week's nomination. Dilsha and Nimisha (14hrs 36min) were joint Runners-up while Aparna (12hrs 20min) was the 2nd Runner-up.
Week 2	Jail	Day 11: Daisy, Jasmine and Robin were voted by housemates as the least performing candidates of the week. The jail task, Cheriya Logos, Valiya Logos proposed a sole winner among these detained contestants who could save themselves from spending jail time. Jasmin emerged victorious while Daisy and Robin were sent to jail.
Week 2	Captaincy Task	Day 12: The captaincy task, Oorakudukku was revealed. The task required the competitors, Aparna, Dilsha, and Nimisha to hook themselves to a rope bound to a frame and figure their way across its length, and then hit the buzzer. Dilsha Prasannan made it across in the shortest time and was declared winner and Captain for Week 3.
Week 2	Saved contestants	Day 13–14: Aswin, Blesslee, Daisy, Dilsha, Jasmin, Robin, and Ronson were declared safe from Week 2 Eviction.
Week 2	Exits	Day 14: Nimisha P S was evicted from the Bigg Boss House after facing the public vote. Later, Bigg Boss sends Nimisha P S to a secret room.
Week 3
Week 3	Entrances	Day 16: Nimisha P S re-entered the Bigg Boss House. Day 20: Manikandan Thonnakkal entered the show as a wildcard contestant.
Week 3	House Captain	Day 12–18: Dilsha Prasannan became the House Captain for Week 3.
Week 3	Nominations	Day 15: Akhil, Aswin, Daisy, Jasmine, Lakshmi, Naveen, and Shalini were nominated for the 3rd Week eviction process.
Week 3	Luxury Budget Task	Day 16–17: The Luxury Budget Task is called Primetime Shows of BBTV. The task required contestants to split themselves into 4 teams and perform 4 skits and 4 advertisements each, alternately within showtimes- Morning, Noon, Evening, and Night in the span of 2 days. Each team would then be granted performance-based TRP ratings of 1–5 stars by the other 3 teams posing as the audience. BB Juniors: Akhil, Aparna, Dhanya, and Lakshmi was the highest-rated team.
Week 3	Jail	Day 18: Blesslee, Daisy, and Lakshmi were voted by housemates as the least performing candidates of the week. The jail task, Kaalperumattam proposed a sole winner among these detained contestants who could save themselves from spending jail time. Blesslee won the privilege while Daisy and Lakshmi were sent to jail.
Week 3	Captaincy Task	Day 19: Aparna, Dhanya and Ronson were voted by housemates as the top performers of the week and nominees for Week 4 Captaincy. The Captaincy task, 'Vellamkali' that followed required the three contestants to fill up their respective empty tumblers placed at equal distances from the base point with water at a nominal walk speed, specifically with the feet being 12 inches apart. Ronson Vincent won the task and was declared Captain for Week 4.
Week 3	Saved contestants	Day 20–21: Akhil, Aswin, Daisy, Jasmine, Lakshmi and Naveen were declared safe from Week 3 Eviction.
Week 3	Exits	Day 21: Shalini Nair was evicted from the Bigg Boss House after facing the public vote.
Week 4
Week 4	Entrances	None
Week 4	House Captain	Day 18–26: Ronson Vincent became the House Captain for Week 4.
Week 4	Nominations	Day 22: Aswin, Blesslee, Robin, and Sooraj were nominated for the 4th week eviction process.
Week 4	Luxury Budget Task	Day 23–24: The Luxury Budget Task is called Aarogyarangam. This weekly task had the contestants divided into two teams, Team Gainers (Underweight), and Team Fire (Overweight) based on their body weight. Health goals were set for both teams, with Team Fire instructed to follow a strict diet plan along with continuous workouts to reduce a combined 10 kg at least, while Team Gainers had to gain no less than 7 kg, with contrasted diet plans and restricted movements, in a span of 4 days. The task was instead completed in 2 days, with Team Gainers – Akhil, Aparna, Aswin, Blesslee, Daisy, Jasmine, and Sooraj managing to beat their health goals at the earliest, gaining a combined 10 kg (approx.)
Week 4	Jail	Day 25: Blesslee, Jasmine, and Naveen were voted by housemates as the least performing candidates of the week. The jail task, Icon proposed a sole winner among these detained contestants who could save themselves from spending jail time. Jasmine won the privilege while Blesslee and Naveen were sent to jail.
Week 4	Captaincy Task	Day 26: Naveen, Nimisha, and Sooraj were voted by housemates as the top performers of the week and nominees for Week 5 Captaincy. The Captaincy task, Palakathaalam that followed required the three contestants to fill up their respective empty tumblers placed at equal distances from the base point with balls using feet platforms to facilitate their walks while maintaining no body contact with the ground. Nimisha P S won the task racking up 17 balls and was declared Captain for Week 5.
Week 4	Saved contestants	Day 27–28: Blesslee, Robin, and Sooraj were declared safe from Week 4 Eviction.
Week 4	Exits	Day 27: Manikandan Thonnakkal walked out from the show due to health issues. Day 28: Aswin Vijay was evicted from the Bigg Boss House after facing the public vote.
Week 5
Week 5	Entrances	None
Week 5	House Captain	Day 26–33: Nimisha P S became the House Captain for Week 5.
Week 5	Nominations	Day 29: Aparna, Blesslee, Daisy, Dilsha, Jasmine, Lakshmi, Naveen, Robin and Ronson were nominated for the 5th week eviction process.
Week 5	Luxury Budget Task	Day 30–31: The Luxury Budget Task is called Shuchithvam Sundaram. The task had the Bigg Boss house emulate 'House of Hygiene Resort Pvt. Ltd. 5 contestants were given unique and eccentric guest roles by the Bigg Boss. The remainder of the contestants were provided with opportunities to apply for the roles of Housekeeping, Security, Janitor, Chief Chef, and Vessel Cleaning selected by a Chief Supervising Manager appointed by the Bigg Boss. This staff had to provide the necessary amenities for the Guests and maintain absolute hygiene at the resort. At the end of Day 1, the 5 guests selected 5 Best Performers among the hotel staff to play new guest roles for Day 2 in addition to new staff and a new CSM appointed by the Bigg Boss.
Week 5	Jail	Day 32: Blesslee, Lakshmi, and Robin were voted by housemates as the least performing candidates of the week. The jail task, Nalla Nadupp proposed a sole winner among these detained contestants who could save themselves from spending jail time. Blesslee and Lakshmi won the privilege on a stalemate while Robin was sent to jail.
Week 5	Captaincy Task	Day 33: Akhil, Daisy, and Suchithra were voted by housemates as the top performers of the week and nominees for Week 6 Captaincy. The Captaincy task, 'Ponn Thooval' required the three contestants to blow each feather from a provided amount and guide as many of them airborne through their respective rings without letting them fall off before a short walk path. Akhil Kutty won the task successfully guiding 17 feathers through the ring and was declared Captain for Week 6.
Week 5	Saved contestants	Day 34–35: Aparna, Blesslee, Dilsha, Jasmine, Lakshmi, and Ronson were declared safe from Week 5 Eviction.
Week 5	Exits	Day 35: Naveen Arakkal and Daisy David were evicted from the Bigg Boss House after facing the public vote.
Week 6
Week 6	Entrances	Day 41: Riyas Salim entered the secret room. Day 42: Vinay Madhav entered the secret room.
Week 6	House Captain	Day 33–40: Akhil Kutty became the House Captain for Week 6.
Week 6	Nominations	Day 36: Blesslee, Dilsha, Jasmine, Lakshmi, Nimisha, Robin, and Ronson were nominated for the 6th week eviction process.
Week 6	Luxury Budget Task	Day 37–38: The Luxury Budget Task is called Katta Waiting. The contestants were given the choice to split themselves into 4 teams of 3 members. Each team was tasked with creating a pyramid out of blocks of 2 sizes that came out of a slider at the sound of a siren at regular intervals. Interruptions to hinder the progress of the opposition teams were encouraged. The team involving Dhanya, Lakshmi, and Suchithra was announced the winner for Day 1. For Day 2, the contestants were adjured to abandon their teams and compete individually instead. Vertical pillars were to be made instead of pyramids. The Top 3 performers for this round were Ronson, Jasmine, and Nimisha.
Week 6	Jail	Day 39: Akhil and Blesslee were voted by housemates as the least performing candidates of the week. The jail task, Uncle Bun proposed a sole winner among these detained contestants could save themselves from spending jail time. Akhil won the task. In addition to winning the privilege, he was also given the power to send an additional contestant of his choice together with Blesslee to jail. He chose Dilsha.
Week 6	Captaincy Task	Day 40: For the Captaincy Task Vaakporu, the top performers of the week Dhanya, Jasmine, Lakshmi, Nimisha, Ronson, Sooraj, and Suchitra were asked to conduct a round table debate on the most eligible contestant to become House Captain for Week 7. An additional offer of a Nomination free card which may be used up to the 10th week was also offered up for the winner. Jasmine M Moosa won the task and was declared Captain for week 7.
Week 6	Saved contestants	Blesslee, Dilsha, Jasmine, Lakshmi, Nimisha, Robin, and Ronson were saved from Week 6 elimination.
Week 6	Exits	There was no eviction in week 6.
Week 7
Week 7	Entrances	Day 43: Riyas Salim, and Vinay Madhav entered the Bigg Boss house.
Week 7	House Captain	Day 41–49: Jasmine M Moosa became the House Captain for Week 7.
Week 7	Nominations	Day 36: Blesslee, Dilsha, Jasmine, Nimisha, Robin and Ronson were nominated for the 7th week eviction process.
Week 7	Luxury Budget Task	Day 44–46: The Luxury Budget Task is called Bigg Boss Court. This task provided the opportunity for contestants to present complaints on issues they experienced in the house to the Bigg Boss Court and find solutions to it. Complaints that they wished to raise were to be deposited in a complaint box first. Riyas Salim and Vinay Madhav were the judges for this task. The plaintiffs could question defendants during their respective trials. They could also bring in other contestants as witnesses, attorneys or solicitors. On victory of the plaintiff, the defendant would have to pay half of their individual points earned. If the plaintiff's allegations were proved to be false, the defendant would receive points instead.
Week 7	Jail	Day 47: Jasmine, Riyas and Robin were voted by housemates as the least performing candidates of the week. The jail task Urulalod Urulal proposed a sole winner among these detained contestants who could save themselves from spending jail time. Jasmine won the privilege while Riyas and Robin were sent to jail.
Week 7	Captaincy Task	Day 49: For the Captaincy Task Jala piranki, the top performers of the week Akhil, Dilsha, Jasmine, Lakshmi, Nimisha, Ronson, Sooraj, and Suchithra will have water spray bottles and buckets full of water in the garden area. There will be balloons and finishing marks on the opposite side. The task is to bring the balloons to the opposite side with the water spray bottle. Akhil Kutty won the task successfully and was declared Captain for Week 8.
Week 7	Saved contestants	Day 49: Blesslee, Dilsha, Jasmine, Robin and Ronson were declared safe from Week 7 Eviction.
Week 7	Exits	Day 49: Nimisha P S was evicted from the Bigg Boss House after facing the public vote.
Week 8
Week 8	Entrances	None
Week 8	House Captain	Day 49–54: Akhil Kutty became the House Captain for Week 8.
Week 8	Nominations	Day 50: Aparna, Blesslee, Dhanya, Dilsha, Lakshmi, Robin and Vinay were nominated for the 8th week eviction process.
Week 8	Luxury Budget Task	Day 51–52: The Luxury Budget task included the housemates completing tasks to get back their basic facilities in the house. The housemates had to choose any one facility which they want to get back and give an item from their ration as a lender and complete the tasks to get them back.
Week 8	Jail	Day 53: Aparna, Dhanya and Suchithra were voted by housemates as the least performing candidates of the week. The jail task Ball Balancing proposed a sole winner among these detained contestants who could save themselves from spending jail time. Aparna won the privilege while Dhanya and Suchithra were sent to jail.
Week 8	Captaincy Task	Day 54: Blesslee, Riyas and Robin were voted by housemates as the top performers of the week and nominees for Week 6 Captaincy. Each contestant to become captain had to be supported by three contestants each. Sticky notes of each color were then given to each contestant. There was a large board in front of the contestants and three tables in the distance. Supporters of each contestant were required to write the name of the contestant they supported on a sticky note and hand it to them to paste on the board. Later Blesslee Muhammad won and was declared Captain for Week 9.
Week 8	Saved contestants	Day 56: Blesslee, Dhanya, Dilsha, Lakshmi, Robin and Vinay were declared safe from Week 8 Eviction.
Week 8	Exits	Day 56: Aparna Mulberry was evicted from the Bigg Boss House after facing the public vote.
Week 9
Week 9	Entrances	None
Week 9	House Captain	Day 54–61: Muhammad Diligent Blesslee became the House Captain for Week 9.
Week 9	Nominations	Day 57: Akhil, Sooraj, Suchithra and Vinay were nominated for the 9th week eviction process.
Week 9	Luxury Budget Task	Day 58–60: The Luxury Budget Task is called Nanayavetta. Coins with different points are obtained in different ways from different places in the garden area. Red has one point, Green 10 points, Blue 20 points, Gray 50 points, and Black 100 points. The task is to collect the maximum number of individual subjects and keep them from being lost, earning the maximum number of points at different stages. Each time the notification is received then the person with the most points must expel one of their opponents from this house from the others in the weekly task. It does not have to be that person's point.
Week 9	Jail	Day 61: Blesslee, Riyas and Robin were voted by housemates as the least performing candidates of the week. The jail task Logotharam proposed a sole winner among these detained contestants could save themselves from spending jail time. Blesslee won the privilege while Robin and Riyas were sent to jail.
Week 9	Captaincy Task	Day 61: The top 2 contestants of the weekly task, Jasmine and Sooraj were joined by Suchithra based on housemate votes as nominees for Week 10 Captaincy. The Captaincy task Vijaya Chumbanam first required each of the three contestants to gather two housemates to support their game. The contestants were to then use sticks tipped with lipglosses to get their supporting housemates to rack up as many lip prints on their respective boards as possible placed at a distance from the initial point. Suchithra Nair won the task recording a total of 70 prints and was declared Captain for Week 10.
Week 9	Saved contestants	Day 63: Akhil, Sooraj, and Vinay were declared safe from Week 9 Eviction.
Week 9	Exits	Day 63: Suchithra Nair was evicted from the Bigg Boss House after facing the public vote.
Week 10
Week 10	Entrances	None
Week 10	House Captain	Day 63–70: Sooraj Thelakkad became the House Captain for Week 10.
Week 10	Nominations	Day 64: Akhil, Blesslee, Dilsha, Riyas, Robin, Ronson and Vinay were nominated for the 10th week eviction process.
Week 10	Luxury Budget Task	Day 65–66: The Luxury Budget Task is called Bigg Boss Saamraajyam. For this task, the Bigg Boss House emulated an old empire. Titles of power were decided by the Bigg Boss himself and announced to the contestants. Namely, the roles of kings and queens. On Day 1, Riyas became the king, Dhanya and Dilsha, the queens. Later, Blesslee used the sceptre's privilege and held the King's power through the end of Day 1. Subsequently, Lakshmi & Dilsha held the title on Day 2. The king's character in this task was strict and dictatorial. Bigg Boss had also provided privileges that could influence the progress of the competitors. The crown and sceptre were given to be wielded by the king. The King could be stripped of their title and powers at the loss of the sceptre and passed to the new wielder. Apart from that, the King was also given a mystery locket, one which would give any wielder the power to save themself from a nomination.
Week 10	Jail	Day 67: Blesslee, Lakshmi and Riyas were voted by housemates as the least performing candidates of the week. The jail task Urundkali proposed a sole winner among these detained contestants could save themselves from spending jail time. Blesslee won the privilege while Lakshmi and Riyas were sent to jail.
Week 10	Captaincy Task	Day 70: Dhanya and Dilsha were voted by housemates as the top performers of the week and nominees for Week 11 Captaincy. Dilsha used her premium she won from the weekly task on being the final wielder of the King's sceptre to choose Blesslee as the 3rd nominee. Right after, Akhil used his privilege to replace Blesslee in the task. The captaincy task, Thalavidhi required the three contenders to wear basket-shaped caps and collect as many balls in it as possible that were being thrown onto by their respective supporting contestants. Later Dhanya Mary Varghese won the task and was declared captain for Week 11.
Week 10	Saved contestants	Day 70: Akhil, Blesslee, Dilsha, Riyas, Ronson and Vinay were declared safe from Week 10 Eviction.
Week 10	Exits	Day 65: Robin Radhakrishnan was moved to the Secret Room. Day 68: Jasmine M Moosa walked out of the Bigg Boss house. Day 69: Robin Radhakrishnan was ejected from the show for violating the rules. There was no eviction in Week 10.
Week 11
Week 11	Entrances	None
Week 11	House Captain	Day 70–75: Dhanya Mary Varghese became the House Captain for Week 11.
Week 11	Nominations	Day 71: Akhil, Blesslee, Lakshmi, Riyas, Ronson, Sooraj and Vinay were nominated for the 11th week eviction process.
Week 11	Luxury Budget Task	Day 72–74: The Luxury Budget Task is called Hello My Dear Wrong Number. The Housemates have to compete in two teams, the call center staff team and the caller team. Each time the buzzer is heard, the caller can contact the call center staff to talk about any issues in the Bigg Boss house, such as contentious issues, attitudes, disagreements, and disagreements, as well as to point out faults and shortcomings. It is the responsibility of the employee to respond satisfactorily to the customers with the discipline of a call center and not to cut off the call before the conversation is over. If they fail to do so, the calling team will receive one point. If the caller fails to do so, the call center team will receive one point. Bigg Boss explains that the weekly task is to get rid of the nomination for the best team and only the winning team gets a luxury point. If the caller fails to do so, the call center team will receive one point.
Week 11	Jail	Day 75: Housemates voted Dilsha and Ronson as the least performing candidates of the week, and were sent to jail.
Week 11	Captaincy Task	Day 75: Akhil, Riyas and Vinay were voted by housemates as the top performers of the week and nominees for Week 12 Captaincy. On one side were placed bowls of colored water and glasses. On the other hand, there are three beakers for each contestant. The colored water had to be taken in a small glass and filled into a beaker. But they were tied with ropes of different colors and shackles to prevent them from crossing the road. Later Akhil Kutty won the task and was declared captain for Week 12.
Week 11	Saved contestants	Day 76–77: Blesslee, Lakshmi, Riyas, Ronson, Sooraj and Vinay were declared safe from Week 11 Eviction.
Week 11	Exits	Day 77: Akhil Kutty was evicted from the Bigg Boss House after facing the public vote.
Week 12
Week 12	Entrances	None
Week 12	House Captain	Day 77–82: Sooraj Thelakkad became the House Captain for Week 12.
Week 12	Nominations	Day 78: Dhanya, Ronson and Vinay were nominated for the 12th week eviction process.
Week 12	Ticket to Finale	Day 79–81: Ticket to Finale All the housemates need to participate in all of the tasks part of the ticket to finale. All the housemates receive points on how they play each task given. Eventually, the housemate with the most points at the end wins the ticket to the finale and enters the finale without getting evicted.: Housemate / Ticket To Finale Tasks & Points; Housemate / Task 1: Waterfalls / Task 2: Oonnuvadi / Task 3: Paattu koottam / Task 4: Bowling / Task 5: Vyakthi mudra / Task 6: Pipeline / Task 7: Cylinder race / Task 8: I am the answer / Task 9: Networking / Task 10: Ponnum kudam / Total; Dilsha / 5 / 5 / 4 / 7 / 8 / 8 / 3 / 2 / 6 / 8 / 56; Blesslee / 2 / 3 / 1 / 8 / 8 / 6 / 5 / 3 / 8 / 7 / 51; Ronson / 3 / 8 / 1 / 5 / 8 / 7 / 8 / 0 / 3 / 4 / 47; Dhanya / 8 / 6 / 0 / 4 / 7 / 5 / 6 / 0 / 5 / 5 / 46; Vinay / 1 / 7 / 5 / 0 / 6 / 3 / 7 / 4 / 7 / 1 / 41; Sooraj / 6 / 2 / 0 / 6 / 8 / 1 / 0 / 3 / 2 / 6 / 34; Riyas / 7 / 1 / 0 / 3 / 1 / 4 / 4 / 2 / 4 / 3 / 29; Lakshmi / 4 / 4 / 0 / 0 / 2 / 2 / 2 / 1 / 1 / 2 / 18; Dilsha Prasannan received the most points and won the ticket to the finale and became the first finalist of the season.
Week 12	Jail	Day 82: Housemates voted Lakshmi and Vinay as the least performing candidates of the week, and were sent to jail.
Week 12	Captaincy Task	Day 82: Dhanya, Dilsha and Ronson were voted by housemates as the top performers of the week and nominees for Week 12 Captaincy. The captaincy task is called Jellykettu. There are boxes full of jelly balls and boxing gloves for the three contestants in the garden area. The task is to put on a boxing glove and take the gel and deposit it in the box opposite when the buzzer is heard. Whoever fills the box the most will be this week's captain. Later Dhanya Mary Varghese won the task and was declared captain for Week 13.
Week 12	Saved contestants	Day 84: Dhanya and Ronson were declared safe from Week 12 Eviction.
Week 12	Exits	Day 84: Vinay Madhav was evicted from the Bigg Boss House after facing the public vote.
Week 13
Week 13	Entrances	None
Week 13	House Captain	Day 82–89: Dhanya Mary Varghese became the House Captain for Week 13.
Week 13	Nominations	Day 85: Blesslee, Dhanya, Lakshmi, Riyas and Ronson were nominated for the 13th week eviction process.
Week 13	Luxury Budget Task	Day 86–87: The Luxury Budget Task is called Aalmaraattam. The 7 housemates were given roles to mimic each other through the course of 2 days. The game also included a buzzer which could be used to switch roles and acquire 1 point everytime a housemate hit it first at the sound of a siren, played at regular intervals. The Top 3 housemates with most points were then rewarded with a dinner night and direct captaincy nominations for Week 14.
Week 13	Jail	Day 88: Blesslee, Ronson and Sooraj were voted by housemates as the least performing candidates of the week. The jail task, Thalapanthu proposed a sole winner among these detained contestants who could save themselves from spending jail time. Blesslee emerged victorious while Ronson and Sooraj were sent to jail.
Week 13	Captaincy Task	Day 89: Dhanya, Dilsha, and Riyas will be competing for the captaincy Via Pom. In the garden area there will be three boards with intricate gaps for the three contestants, sticks with hooks and five cubes of different colors. The task is to hold the stick behind the watermark while listening to the buzzer, pass it through the cube through these intricate paths and put it on the top hook. Afterwards, the three had a tough match. With four cubes, Riyas Salim became the last captain of Bigg Boss.
Week 13	Saved contestants	Day 90–91: Blesslee, Dhanya, Lakshmi and Riyas were declared safe from Week 13 Eviction.
Week 13	Exits	Day 91: Ronson Vincent was evicted from the Bigg Boss House after facing the public vote.
Week 14
Week 14	Entrances	None
Week 14	House Captain	Day 89: Riyas Salim became the House Captain for Week 14.
Week 14	Finalists	Day 92: Blesslee, Dhanya, Dilsha, Lakshmi, Riyas and Sooraj were nominated on the final week.
Week 14	Luxury Budget Task	Day 93–94: The Luxury Budget Task is called Drishyavismayam. The contestants were shown some clips of some events in the house based on which they had to answer the questions asked.
Week 14	Reunion	Day 96: Janaki Sudheer, Manikandan Thonnakkal, Shalini Nair, Aswin Vijay, Naveen Arakkal, Nimisha P.S, Vinay Madhav, Aparna Mulberry, Suchithra Nair, Jasmine M. Moosa and Robin Radhakrishnan entered the house as special guest to reunite with the finalists. Day 97: Akhil Kutty, Ronson Vincent and Daisy David entered the house as special guest to reunite with the finalists.
Week 14	5th Runner up	Day 99: Sooraj Thelakkad became the 5th Runner-up
Week 14	4th Runner up	Day 99: Dhanya Mary Varghese became the 4th Runner-up & Punctuality Award
Week 14	3rd Runner up	Day 99: Lakshmi Priya became the 3rd Runner-up & Entertainer Award
Week 14	2nd Runner up	Day 99: Riyas Salim became the 2nd Runner-up & Game Changer Award
Week 14	1st Runner up	Day 99: Muhammad Diligent Blesslee became the 1st Runner-up
Week 14	Winner	Day 99: Dilsha Prasannan became the WINNER

== Nomination table ==
	Week 1		Week 2	Week 3	Week 4	Week 5	Week 6	Week 7	Week 8	Week 9	Week 10	Week 11	Week 12	Week 13	Week 14		
	Day 1	Day 4	Week 2	Week 3	Week 4	Week 5	Week 6	Week 7	Week 8	Week 9	Week 10	Week 11	Week 12	Week 13	Finale		
Nominees for Captaincy	Aswin; Janaki; Nimisha	Naveen; Ronson; Suchithra		Aparna; Dilsha; Nimisha	Aparna; Dhanya; Ronson	Naveen; Nimisha; Sooraj	Akhil; Daisy; Suchithra	Dhanya; Jasmine; Nimisha; Lakshmi; Ronson; Sooraj; Suchithra	Akhil; Dilsha; Jasmine; Lakshmi; Nimisha; Ronson; Sooraj; Suchithra	Blesslee; Riyas; Robin	Jasmine; Sooraj; Suchithra	Akhil; ~~Blesslee~~; Dhanya; Dilsha	Akhil; Riyas; Vinay	Dhanya; Dilsha; Ronson	Dhanya; Dilsha; Riyas		
House Captain	Aswin	Naveen		Dilsha	Ronson	Nimisha	Akhil	Jasmine	Akhil	Blesslee	~~Suchithra~~	Dhanya	~~Akhil~~	Dhanya	Riyas		
House Captain	Aswin	Naveen		Dilsha	Ronson	Nimisha	Akhil	Jasmine	Akhil	Blesslee	Sooraj	Dhanya	Sooraj	Dhanya	Riyas		
Captain's Nominations	No; Nominees		Daisy; Robin	Akhil	Naveen (to save)	Aparna; Ronson	Blesslee; Dilsha	No; Nominees			Blesslee; Riyas	No; Nominees	Vinay; Ronson	Blesslee; Riyas	No; Nominees		
BB Prison	Aswin; Blesslee		Daisy; ~~Jasmine~~; Robin	~~Blesslee~~; Daisy; Lakshmi	Blesslee; ~~Jasmine~~; Naveen	~~Blesslee~~; ~~Lakshmi~~; Robin	~~Akhil~~; Blesslee; Dilsha	~~Jasmine~~; Riyas; Robin	~~Aparna~~; Dhanya; Suchithra	~~Blesslee~~; Riyas; Robin	~~Blesslee~~; Lakshmi; Riyas	Dilsha; Ronson	Lakshmi; Vinay	~~Blesslee~~; Ronson; Sooraj	None		
Vote to:	Evict								Evict/Save		Evict	Evict/Save	Evict		WIN		
Dilsha	Nominated		Aswin; Lakshmi	House; Captain	Dhanya; Naveen	Dhanya; Naveen	Ronson; Sooraj	Nominated	Nominated	Saved	Ronson; Vinay	Saved	Ronson; Dhanya	Dhanya; Ronson	Finalist	Winner (Day 99)	
Blesslee	Nominated		Ronson; Shalini	Jasmine; Lakshmi	Aswin; Robin	Daisy; Naveen	Jasmine; Ronson	Nominated	Nominated	House; Captain	Akhil; Riyas	Nominated	Vinay; Dhanya	Dhanya; Lakshmi	Finalist	1st runner-up (Day 99)	
Riyas	Not In House						Entered (Day 41)	No; Nomination	Saved	Saved	Not eligible	Nominated	Dhanya; Vinay	Dhanya; Sooraj	Finalist	2nd runner-up (Day 99)	
Lakshmi	Nominated		Daisy; Robin	Daisy; Shalini	Dilsha; Robin	Aparna; Jasmine	Jasmine; Nimisha	Saved	Nominated	Saved	Blesslee; Riyas	Nominated	Vinay; Ronson	Blesslee; Riyas	Finalist	3rd runner-up (Day 99)	
Dhanya	Nominated		Aswin; Robin	Naveen; Ronson	Aswin; Robin	Dilsha; Lakshmi	Aparna; Robin	No; Nomination	Nominated	Saved	Riyas; Robin	House; Captain	Ronson; Vinay	Nominated	Finalist	4th runner-up (Day 99)	
Sooraj	Nominated		Blesslee; Robin	Aswin; Shalini	Blesslee; Robin	Blesslee; Robin	Lakshmi; Robin	No; Nomination	Saved	Nominated	House; Captain	Nominated	House; Captain	Riyas; Ronson	Finalist	5th runner-up (Day 99)	
Ronson	Nominated		Daisy; Robin	Jasmine; Lakshmi	House; Captain	Blesslee; Robin	Lakshmi; Robin	Nominated	Saved	Saved	Blesslee; Riyas	Nominated	Dhanya; Dilsha	Lakshmi; Dhanya	Evicted (Day 91)		
Vinay	Not In House						Entered (Day 42)	No; Nomination	Nominated	Nominated	Blesslee; Dilsha	Nominated	Blesslee; Dhanya	Evicted (Day 84)			
Akhil	Nominated		Jasmine; Nimisha	Naveen; Robin	Blesslee; Robin	Dilsha; Robin	House; Captain	No; Nomination	House; Captain	Nominated	Blesslee; Robin	Nominated	Evicted (Day 77)				
Robin	Nominated		Jasmine; Nimisha	Lakshmi; Naveen	Aswin; Naveen	Daisy; Lakshmi	Nimisha; Ronson	Nominated	Nominated	Saved	Secret Room	Ejected (Day 69)					
Jasmine	Nominated		Daisy; Robin	Akhil; Lakshmi	Naveen; Robin	Aparna; Robin	Lakshmi; Robin	Nominated	Saved	Saved	Blesslee; Robin	Walked (Day 68)					
Suchithra	Nominated		Aswin; Robin	Naveen; Shalini	Blesslee; Robin	Dilsha; Lakshmi	Dhanya; Robin	No; Nomination	Saved	Nominated	Evicted (Day 63)						
Aparna	Nominated		Aswin; Ronson	Aswin; Lakshmi	Jasmine; Sooraj	Jasmine; Lakshmi	Nimisha; Ronson	No; Nomination	Nominated	Evicted (Day 56)							
Nimisha	Nominated		Daisy; Robin	Not eligible	Blesslee; Sooraj	House; Captain	Lakshmi; Robin	Nominated	Evicted (Day 49)								
Daisy	Nominated		Blesslee; Jasmine	Lakshmi; Aswin	Robin; Manikandan	Blesslee; Ronson	Evicted (Day 35)										
Naveen	Nominated		House; Captain	Jasmine; Daisy	Robin; Daisy	Robin; Blesslee	Evicted (Day 35)										
Aswin	~~House~~; ~~Captain~~		Dilsha; Robin	Lakshmi; Suchithra	Blesslee; Lakshmi	Evicted (Day 28)											
Manikandan	Not In House			Entered (Day 20)	Nimisha; Sooraj	Walked (Day 27)											
Shalini	Nominated		Dhanya; Dilsha	Lakshmi; Daisy	Evicted (Day 21)												
Janaki	Nominated		Evicted (Day 7)														
Notes	1, 2		3, 4	5, 6, 7, 8, 9	10, 11, 12	13	14, 15, 16, 17	18, 19, 20, 21, 22	23, 24, 25	26, 27	28, 29, 30, 31, 32, 33, 34	35, 36	37, 38	39, 40, 41	42, 43		
Against Public Vote	Akhil; Aparna; Blesslee; Daisy; Dhanya; Dilsha; Janaki; Jasmine; Lakshmi; Naveen; Nimisha; Robin; Ronson; Shalini; Sooraj; Suchithra		Aswin; Blesslee; Daisy; Dilsha; Jasmine; Nimisha; Robin; Ronson	Akhil; Aswin; Daisy; Jasmine; Lakshmi; Naveen; Shalini	Aswin; Blesslee; ~~Naveen~~ Robin Sooraj	Aparna; Blesslee; Daisy; Dilsha; Jasmine; Lakshmi; Naveen; Robin; Ronson	Blesslee; Dilsha; Jasmine; ~~Lakshmi~~; Nimisha; Robin; Ronson		Aparna; Blesslee; Dhanya; Dilsha; Lakshmi; Robin; ~~Ronson~~; Vinay	Akhil; Sooraj; Suchithra; Vinay	Akhil; Blesslee; Dilsha; Riyas; Robin; Ronson; Vinay	Akhil; Blesslee; Lakshmi; Riyas; Ronson; Sooraj; Vinay	Dhanya; Ronson; Vinay	Blesslee; Dhanya; Lakshmi; Riyas; Ronson	Blesslee; Dhanya; Dilsha; Lakshmi; Riyas; Sooraj		
Secret Room	None			Nimisha	None		Riyas	None			Robin	None					
Secret Room	None			Nimisha	None		Vinay	None			Robin	None					
Walked	None				Manikandan	None					Jasmine	None					
Ejected	None										Robin	None					
Evicted	Janaki		~~Nimisha~~	Shalini	Aswin	Naveen	No Eviction	Nimisha	Aparna	Suchithra	No Eviction	Akhil	Vinay	Ronson	Sooraj	Dhanya	Lakshmi
Evicted	Janaki		~~Nimisha~~	Shalini	Aswin	Daisy	No Eviction	Nimisha	Aparna	Suchithra	No Eviction	Akhil	Vinay	Ronson	Riyas	Blesslee	Dilsha

=== Notes ===
indicates the House Captain.
indicates the Nominees for house captaincy.
indicates that the Housemate was directly nominated for eviction prior to the regular nominations process.
indicates that the Housemate was granted immunity from nominations.
indicates ticket to finale winner.
indicates the winner.
indicates the first runner up.
indicates the second runner up.
indicates the third runner up.
indicates the fourth runner up.
indicates the fifth runner up.
indicates the contestant as Weak Performer of the week.
indicates the contestant has re-entered the house.
indicates that the Housemate was in the Secret Room.
indicates that the Housemate was in the Secret Room for violating Bigg Boss rules.
indicates a new wildcard contestant.
indicates the Eviction free pass has been used on a housemate.
indicates the contestant has been walked out of the show.
indicates the contestant has been evicted.

- ^Note 1 : But all housemates were nominated by Bigg Boss, with the exception of the house captain.
- ^Note 2 : Aswin Vijay lost his captaincy after being voted as the least performing contender, who was thereafter jailed. As a result, Naveen Arakkal took over the title, although his weekly eviction nomination remains the same.
- ^Note 3 : Jasmine M Moosa won the task relief from going to BB prison.
- ^Note 4 : Nimisha P S was evicted on Day 14 but was sent to a secret room by Bigg Boss.
- ^Note 5 : Muhammad Diligent Blesslee was declared safe for the third week's eviction process after winning the task Bhagya Petakam.
- ^Note 6 : Bigg Boss gave Dilsha Prasannan the power to nominate someone directly. Dilsha Prasannan nominated Akhil Kutty.
- ^Note 7 : Nimisha P S re-entered on Bigg Boss on Day 16.
- ^Note 8 : Muhammad Diligent Blesslee won the task relief from going to BB prison.
- ^Note 9 : Manikandan Thonnakkal entered the Bigg boss house as Wildcard Contestant on Day 20.
- ^Note 10 : Bigg Boss gave Ronson Vincent the power to save one of the nominees directly. He chose to save Naveen Arakkal.
- ^Note 11 : Jasmine M Moosa won the task relief from going to BB prison.
- ^Note 12 : Manikandan Thonnakkal walked out of Bigg Boss because of his health issues on Day 27.
- ^Note 13 : Muhammad Diligent Blesslee and Lakshmi Priya won the task relief from going to BB prison.
- ^Note 14 : Bigg Boss gave Akhil Kutty the power to directly nominate two contestants, not on the nominee list. He chose to nominate Muhammad Diligent Blesslee & Dilsha Prasannan.
- ^Note 15 : Akhil Kutty won the jail task of relief from going to BB prison and Bigg Boss gave him the power to directly nominate another contestant to jail, and he choose Dilsha Prasannan.
- ^Note 16 : The captaincy task contenders Dhanya Mary Varghese, Jasmine M Moosa, Lakshmi Priya, Nimisha P S, Ronson Vincent, Sooraj Thelakkad, and Suchitra Nair received an offer of a Nomination free card which may be used up to the 10th week. Jasmine M Moosa won the Nomination free card alongside the Captaincy for Week 7.
- ^Note 17 : Riyas Salim entered the Bigg boss house as Wildcard Contestant on Day 41 and entered the secret room.
- ^Note 18 : Vinay Madhav entered the Bigg boss house as Wildcard Contestant on Day 42 and entered the secret room.
- ^Note 19 : As No Eviction was passed at the end of Week 6, the nominees of Week 6 were nominated again for the Week 7 eviction process.
- ^Note 20 : Riyas Salim and Vinay Madhav saved Lakshmi Priya from Week 7 eviction process.
- ^Note 21 : Riyas Salim and Vinay Madhav entered the Bigg Boss house on Day 43.
- ^Note 22 : Jasmine M Moosa won the task relief from going to BB prison.
- ^Note 23 : Bigg Boss paired up the housemates and asked them to mutually decide to nominate one and save one.
- ^Note 24 : Jasmine M Moosa used her Nomination-Free Card to save Ronson Vincent from the eviction process for Week 8.
- ^Note 25 : Aparna Mulberry won the task relief from going to BB prison.
- ^Note 26 : Bigg Boss grouped the housemates into four groups of three and asked them to decide & nominate one mutually from each group.
- ^Note 27 : Muhammad Diligent Blesslee won the task relief from going to BB prison.
- ^Note 28 : Suchitra Nair was stripped off the captaincy after she was evicted on Day 63. She chose Sooraj Thelakkad to take up the Captaincy for Week 10.
- ^Note 29 : Riyas Salim and Robin Radhakrishnan were debarred from participating in the Week 10 Nomination Process following the penal verdict by the Host against their Week 7 offences.
- ^Note 30 : During the weekly task, Robin Radhakrishnan had a physical altercation with Riyas Salim. Later, Bigg Boss announced that despite warnings, Robin Radhakrishnan continued to behave violently in the house and was thereby proved unfit for the show. As a result, he was temporarily moved to the Secret Room.
- ^Note 31 : Muhammad Diligent Blesslee won the task relief from going to BB prison.
- ^Note 32 : Jasmine M Moosa walked out of the house on Day 68 due to mental pressure.
- ^Note 33 : Robin Radhakrishnan was ejected from the show on Day 69 for violating house rules.
- ^Note 34 : There was No Eviction on Week 10 due to Jasmine M Moosa's walk out and Robin Radhakrishnan's ejection.
- ^Note 35 : Akhil Kutty used his power to replace Muhammad Diligent Blesslee as a captaincy contender for Week 11.
- ^Note 36 : Bigg Boss paired up the housemates and asked them to mutually decide to nominate one and save one.
- ^Note 37 : Akhil Kutty was stripped off the captaincy after he was evicted on Day 77. He chose Sooraj Thelakkad to take up the captaincy for Week 12.
- ^Note 38 : Riyas Salim won immunity from the 12th week eviction process after winning the task Hello My Dear Wrong Number.
- ^Note 39 : On winning the ticket to finale during Week 12, Dilsha Prasannan was awarded direct entry into the finale week.
- ^Note 40 : Although Dhanya Mary Varghese became the House Captain for Week 13, housemates could still nominate her for the eviction process.
- ^Note 41 : Muhammad Diligent Blesslee won the task relief from going to BB prison.
- ^Note 42 : Although Riyas Salim became the House Captain for Week 14, housemates could still nominate him for the finale week eviction process.
- ^Note 43 : On Day 92, Muhammad Diligent Blesslee, Dhanya Mary Varghese, Dilsha Prasannan, Lakshmi Priya, Riyas Salim, and Sooraj Thelakkad announced as Top 6 finalists and directly nominate for finale week eviction process.

== Ratings and viewership ==
Official ratings are taken from BARC India.
(TRP of the episodes telecasting in Asianet only)

Grand Premiere		Grand Finale	
TRP Rating	Viewers(In Million's)	TRP Rating	Viewers(In Million's)
10.14	22.3	15.19	33.4

Weekly TRP Rating

Week 1	8.81	March 28 – 1 April
Week 2	7.16	2 April – 8 April
Week 3	6.3	9 April – 15 April
Week 4	7.00	16 April – 22 April
Week 5	6.95	23 April – 29 April
Week 6	8.00	30 April – 6 May
Week 7	8.12	7 May – 13 May
Week 8	8.4	14 May – 20 May
Week 9	8.7	21 May – 27 May
Week 10	9.27	28 May – 3 June
Week 11	8.93	4 June – 10 June
Week 12	8.42	11 June – 17 June
Week 13	8.50	18 June – 24 June
Week 14	9.28	25 June – 1 July
