= Seetha Kalyanam (TV series) =

- Seetha Kalyanam
- Genre: family Drama; Romantic
- Created by: Nap Creations
- Based on: Lakshmi Kalyanam
- Written by: Sangeetha Mohan; NAP Creative Team; Vallikodu Vikraman
- Directed by: Sunil Karyattukara; Manu V Nair; Kurup Mararikkulam
- Starring: see below
- Theme music composer: Music : Sijo John; Lyrics : B.K. Harinarayanan; Singer :Ananya
- Opening theme: "ഓമൽ കുരുന്നുകൾ"; Omal Kurunnukal by Ananya
- Ending theme: "സീതാ കല്യാണാ വൈഭോഗമേ" "Seethakalyana Vaibhogame"
- Composers: Background Score : Gokul Sreekandhan, Rajeev Attukal
- Country of origin: India
- Original language: Malayalam
- No. of seasons: 1
- No. of episodes: 772

Production
- Producer: NAAP Communications
- Cinematography: Anpu Mani; Renju Mani
- Editors: Harimukham; Libin George; Akhil V Kumar; Pradeep Bhagvath
- Camera setup: Multi-camera
- Running time: 22 minutes

Original release
- Network: Asianet
- Release: 10 September 2018 – 10 September 2021

Related
- Parasparam; Lakshmi Kalyanam

Seetha Kalyanam is an Indian Malayalam-language television soap opera drama. The show premiered on general entertainment channel Asianet channel and streaming on Disney+ Hotstar from 10 September 2018. Malayalam film actress Dhanya Mary Varghese played the title role in the show. The show is the official remake of Telugu soap opera Lakshmi Kalyanam which aired on Star Maa. The show aired its last episode on 10 September 2021.

It replaced Parasparam as the longest running serial in Malayalam, which completed 1,524 Episodes.

== Plot ==
Seetha and Swathi are sisters from a poor household supported by their mother. Their mother dies and leaves Swathi in Seetha's care telling her that Swathi is now like her daughter. Seetha works to fund Swathi's education, remaining illiterate herself.

A grown-up Seetha and Swathi meet Rajeshwari, a bad-tempered and arrogant woman who hates poor people. Seetha gets into a fight with Rajeshwari and later apologises to her driver Kalyan. A humiliated Rajeshwari vows to take revenge from the sisters. Kalyan, who is in fact Rajeshwari's elder son, falls in love with Seetha. Swathi tries to commit suicide but is stopped by Seetha who is shocked to find out that Swathi is pregnant with her ex-boyfriend's child. Her ex-boyfriend is revealed to be Ajay, Rajeshwari's younger son.

Seetha helps Ajay and Swathi reunite. Rajeshwari is forced to accept them after Ajay tries to commit suicide. It is then revealed that Rajeshwari is in fact Kalyan's maternal aunt and step-mother. She finds a will bequeathing the entire property to Kalyan and plots to marry him to a sterile woman so he can never have children who can inherit.

Seetha and Kalyan fall in love. Rajeshwari demands Seetha marry her older son Kalyan and sign an agreement that she will never bear children and only then will she agree to Swathi and Ajay's marriage. Seetha agrees and breaks up with Kalyan. Swathi tries to stop Seetha but fails. On the wedding day, Kalyan and Seetha discover they are marrying each other and are shocked.

Seetha tries to win Kalyan's heart but all in vain. She starts working with the kalaakaars at the textile factory and wins them over helping them get their jobs back from Rajeshwari, thus impressing Kalyan. She then helps Kalyan track down his biological mother Ambika who had been accused of murder and is hated by Kalyan's father Venu because of misunderstandings created by Rajeshwari. This brings them closer and he accepts that she must have had a reason for rejecting him.

Later, Seetha gets pregnant too. However, Rajeshwari makes another evil move. She hires goons to kidnap Kalyan. Later, a lawyer named Jayadevan claims that Rajeshwari is his wife. Rajeshwari is shocked and worried.

It is later revealed in a flashback that, Rajeshwari's real name was Radhika Devi. She was from a wealthy family. She fell in love with Jayadevan, the son of a police officer. His father, had wished his son and his nephew, Hariprasad "Hari" to be an officer just like him.

Jayadevan and Hari is happy with the idea. It is also shown that Hari was in love with Jayasudha, the sister of Jayadevan. It is shown that Radhika, desperately wanted to marry Jayadevan. However, Jayadevan denied it to follow his dreams. Agitated, Radhika threatened him that she would commit suicide. Helpless, Jayadevan agrees. Soon, after Radhika gives birth to Aswathy, but she is mentally disabled because of which Radhika hates her and attempts to kill her, which fails.

Meanwhile, Jayadevan is in jail for the crime he didn't commit. After, releasing Jayadevan gets to know of Radhika's evil motives. However, he is shattered to learn that Radhika also murdered his family except Hari. Jayadevan and Hari joins hands to revenge. Jayadevan studies law and becomes a lawyer. Not knowing any of these, Ajay suspects Rajeshwari's evil motives and trusts Jayadevan. However, Jayadevan struggles to tell Ajay that he is Ajay's father.

Seetha brings in two children, Meenakshi "Meenu" and the other is none other than Aswathy "Achu" (She grew up under the care of Jayadevan), now a grown up girl. Achu and Meenu dislikes Rajeshwari. Meenu is later kidnapped, by Annadurai, Rajeshwari's goon.

Kalyan, is now a drug addict. However, Seetha manages to get Rajeshwari arrested and rescues Kalyan and Meenu. Ajay, realises that Jayadevan is his father and Achu is his sister. The show ends joyously with Jayadevan, Ajay, Kalyan, Meenu, Swathi and Seetha rejoicing, Rajeshwari's defeat.

== Cast ==
=== Lead cast ===
- Dhanya Mary Varghese as Seetha – Swathi's sister; Sravani's half-sister; Kalyan's wife
  - Eva as Child Seetha
- Reneesha Rahiman as Swathi – Seetha's sister; Sravani's half-sister; Ajay's wife
  - Baby Athmika as Child Swathi
- Roopa Sree as Radhika "Rajeshwari" Devi – Ambika's sister; Venu and Jayadevan's wife; Ajay and Aswathy's mother; Kalyan's step-mother
  - Souparnika Subhash as Young Radhika Devi
- Anoop Krishnan / Alif Shah as Kalyan – Ambika and Venu's son; Radhika's step-son; Ajay and Aswathy's cousin; Seetha's husband
- Jithu Venugopal as Ajay – Radhika and Jayadevan's son; Aswathy's brother; Kalyan's cousin; Swathi's husband
- Sona Nair as Ambika Devi aka Saradananda Swamikal – Radhika's sister; Venu's ex-wife; Kalyan's mother
- Anand Thrissur as Venu – Ambika's ex-husband; Radhika's first husband; Kalyan's father
- Rahul Mohan as Jayadevan – Jayasudha's brother; Hariprasad's cousin; Radhika's husband; Ajay and Aswathy's father

=== Recurring cast ===
- J Padmanabhan Thampi as Moorthy
- Adithyan Jayan as SP Hariprasad IPS – Jayadevan and Jayasudha's cousin
- Amboori Jayan as Mahendran
- Souparnika subhash as Ashwathy aka Achu – Radhika and Jayadevan's daughter; Ajay's sister; Kalyan's cousin
- Gopika Janardhanan as SP Pooja IPS
- Archana Suseelan as Sravani Saigal – Seetha and Swathi's half-sister
- Tom Jacob as Annadurai
- Manu Varma as Jayadevan and Hariprasad's father
- Haridas as Hrishikeshananda Swamikal
  - Disciple of Saradananda Swamikal and spoiled brat who aims to take over Swami's wealth
- Ranjith Raj as SP Goutham IPS
- Saji Surya as CI Musthafa
- Joshy Varghese as DYSP Mahesh
- Vimala as Shantha, Rajeshwari's Servant
- Hareendran as Hari
- Rajmohan as Hareendra Varma
- Anoop Sivasenan as Abhiram
- Sini Varghese as Nayana/Shreya
- Anzil Rahman as Abhiram's Friend
- Subbalakshmi as Sravani's grandmother
- Anugraha as Minnu, Achu's Friend
- Asha Nair as Nimmy
- Pala Aravindan as Mashammavan
- Sheeji Master as D2A2
- Sreekutty as Pramila
- Raima Rai as Nurse, Mashammavan's daughter
- Surya Mohan as Sandra
- Aparna Nair as CI Nirmala
- Manu Gopinathan as Theeppori Bhaskaran
- ____ as Dr. Reshma
- Leela Manacaud

=== Guest appearance ===
- Leena Nair as Seetha and Swathi's mother (Dead)
- Della George as herself (Episode 11)
- Pratheeksha G Pradeep as herself (Episode 11)
- Haritha G Nair as herself (Episode 11)
- Vindhuja Vikraman as host (Episode 11)
- Rohini M Jayachandran as Anchor (Episode 33)
- Mareena Michael Kurisingal as Marina in Maha episode (Episode 362)

== Controversies ==
In June 2021, police arrested the cast and crew of the show from a resort in Varkala for secretly shooting the TV series violating COVID-19 protocols. The lead actors Dhanya Mary Varghese, Reneesha Rahiman and Jithu Venugopal later revealed that they were not part of the shoot.

Anoop Krishnan who played lead role of Kalyan left the show in February 2021 due to his entry in Bigg Boss season 3. Later in June 2021, he said that he completely left the show stating that he is looking for big screen roles. After almost 4 years in March 2025, he reveled that his experience on the show as "torturous" and mentioned that the management of the production, including delayed payments, made it difficult for him to continue. The delayed payments and other frustrations with the show’s management were significant factors in his decision to leave.

== Awards and reception ==
12th Asianet Television Awards 2019

- Best Star Pair –Anoop krishnan and Dhanya mary varghese
- Performer In a Negative Role -Roopasree

This is the third serial among the 5 top-rated serials in Malayalam television with 4.46 million impressions (Week 05, 2019) following Vanambadi and Neelakkuyil, according to BARC India. The TRPs of weeks in month January 2019 is shown below.

=== January 2019 ===
Date	Episode	Rank	TRP Rating (Impressions)
30 Mar – 5 Apr	157 – 162	2	4.20 M
26 Jan – 1 Feb	109 – 113	3	4.46 M
19 Jan – 25 Jan	104 – 108	3	4.24 M
12 Jan – 18 Jan	98 – 103	3	4.67 M
5 Jan – 11 Jan	93 – 97	3	5.00 M
29 Dec – 4 Jan	88 – 92	3	4.59 M

=== 2020 ===
In July 2020, the show got 4th position, and in August 2020, it dropped to fifth position.

== Adaptations ==
Language	Title	Original release	Network(s)	Last aired	Notes
Telugu	Lakshmi Kalyanam లక్ష్మీ కళ్యాణం	7 November 2016	Star Maa	10 October 2020	Original
Tamil	Lakshmi Kalyanam லட்சுமி கல்யாணம்	7 February 2017	Star Vijay	23 June 2017	Remake
Kannada	Sindhoora ಸಿಂಧೂರ	20 March 2017	Star Suvarna	23 April 2020	Remake
Bengali	Mayar Badhon মায়ার বাঁধন	29 May 2017	Star Jalsha	17 June 2018	Remake
Hindi	Jiji Maa जीजी माँ	9 October 2017	Star Bharat	18 February 2019	Remake
Malayalam	Seetha Kalyanam സീതാകല്യാണം	10 September 2018	Asianet	10 September 2021	Remake
