= Reneesha Rahiman =

Indian actress

- Born: 10 July 1999 (age 27); Palakkad, Kerala
- Occupation: Actress
- Years active: 2015–present
- Known for: Seetha Kalyanam; Bigg Boss (Malayalam season 5)

Reneesha Rahiman (born July 10, 1999) is an Indian actress who works in the Malayalam television and film industry. She is known for her role in TV series Seetha Kalyanam. She is also emerged as the first runner-up in Bigg Boss (Malayalam season 5).

== Career ==
She made her debut in the Malayalam TV series Seetha Kalyanam at age of 17. She also contested in Bigg Boss Malayalam season 5 and became first runner-up. In 2024, she made her debut in Film through Exit.

== Filmography ==
=== Films ===
- All films are in Malayalam unless otherwise noted.

Year	Show	Role	Notes
2007	Chattambinadu	Child artist	
2015	Jo and the Boy	Jo's friend	
2016	Kavi Uddheshichathu..?	Baby Girl's Mother	
2017	Sarvopari Palakkaran		
2017	Imai	Nandha	Tamil film
2024	Exit	Anna	

=== Television ===
TV series

- All TV series are in Malayalam.

Year	Show	Role	Notes	Ref.
2018–2021	Seetha Kalyanam	Swathi	Debut Serial	
2021–2022	Manassinakkare	Anjali	Replaced Aswathy Ash	
2022	Kanakanmani	Anjali	Guest appearance	
2023	Sita Ramam	Poornima	Replaced by Raheena Anas	
2023	Patharamattu	Herself	Promo appearance	
2024	Ishtam Mathram	Herself	Promo appearance	
2024	Premam	Anjali	Web series	
2024-2025	Janakiyudeyum Abhiyudeyum Veedu	Niranjana		
2025–present	Chembarathy	Aiswarya Lakshmi		
2026–present	Sukhamo Devi	Isabella		
2026–present	Thenmavin Kombath	Daliya		

TV shows

Year	Show	Role	Notes	Ref.
2019	Start Music Aaradhyam Paadum	Contestant		
2021	Bhayam	Contestant		
2023	Bigg Boss 5	Contestant	First runner-up	
2023	Comedy Stars	Guest		
2023-2024	Star Magic	Contestant		
2023	She Chef	Host		
2024	Bigg Boss 6	Performer	On skit	
2024- 2025	Behind Woods ice	Host	Interview	
2025	Enkile Ennodu Para	Contestant		
2025	Bigg Boss 7	Instructor	Launch episode	
2026	Bigg Boss Agnipareeksha	Host		

== Awards ==
Year	Award	Category	Work	Result	Ref.
2026	4th Kerala Vision Television Awards	Best Negative Character	Chembarathy	Won	
