= Bigg Boss (Malayalam TV series) season 2 =

Second season of the Malayalam reality TV series Bigg Boss

Bigg Boss
- Season 2
- Presented by: Mohanlal
- No. of days: 75
- No. of contestants: 22
- Winner: Nil (Show cancelled after 76 episodes due to COVID.)
- No. of episodes: 76

Release
- Original network: Asianet
- Original release: 5 January – 20 March 2020

Series chronology
- ← Previous; Season 1 Next → Season 3

The second season of the Malayalam-language version of the Indian reality television series Bigg Boss premiered on 5 January 2020. It was produced by Endemol Shine India and broadcast on Asianet. Mohanlal returned as the host. The show follows 22 contestants, who are isolated from the outside world for 105 days (or 15 weeks) in a custom built house. The house was situated at EVP Film City in Chennai, where 17 contestants entered on Day 1 and six joined later as wildcard entries. All housemates were public figures, such as film, television, music, radio, stage, and internet personalities, and models. The winner of the season received a flat worth ₹5 million (₹50 lakh) along with a trophy. The second season introduced an aftershow titled BB Cafe. On 20 March 2020, the show was stopped due to COVID-19.

== Production ==
The season two of the Malayalam-language version of Bigg Boss is produced by Endemol Shine India and telecast on Asianet. In September 2019, it was confirmed that Mohanlal will return as the host for the second season as well and Asianet announced that season two would take off soon and asked viewers to suggest contestants to be featured on the show through their social media pages. Season two comes with the tagline: Ini Valiya Kalikalumalla, Kalikal Vere Level (it's no longer just big games, now the games will be on its next level). The newly designed eye logo was unveiled in November 2019, first promo for the show was also relea on that month.

=== House ===
The House for the first season of Bigg Boss was built at Goregaon Film City, Mumbai. Since season 13 of Hindi Bigg Boss was ongoing at the location, the location has to be shifted to EVP Film City, Chennai, where the first three seasons of Bigg Boss Tamil were filmed. The 6000 square feet House was redesigned in the traditional architectural style of Kerala. Along with all the facilities that were available in the first season, the major new addition was a jail room with an attached toilet for incarcerating housemates who violate the rules of the House. The essential facilities retained from the first season were the dining area, living area, store room, kitchen, two bedrooms with eight beds, washroom, TV, swimming pool, confession room for interacting with Bigg Boss (voice), and smoke room for smokers.

=== Broadcast ===
The second season is telecast on Asianet, initially from Monday to Friday at 9:30 pm IST and at 9:00 pm IST on Saturdays and Sundays. From 9 March 2020 onward, the duration was extended and the airing time was changed to 9:00 pm on weekdays too. Asianet also airs an aftershow BB Cafe hosted by Rajesh Keshav and Gopika. The show is available for streaming on the over-the-top platform Hotstar. It is aired in two parts—Bigg Boss and Bigg Boss Plus. Hotstar may or may not contain a few bits aired on television at the original airing time. Additionally, the YouTube channel of Asianet also uploads short "UnCut" clips not broadcast on television and Hotstar. The 30-minute BB Cafe Live regularly reads live comments on YouTube and Facebook about each day's episodes.

== Housemates status ==
Housemate	Day entered	Day exited	Status
Arya	Day 1	Day 75	Sent Home
Abhirami	Day 49	Day 75	Sent Home
Amritha	Day 49	Day 75	Sent Home
Fukru	Day 1	Day 75	Sent Home
Sujo	Day 1	Day 32	Walked
Sujo	Day 49	Day 75	Sent Home
Saju	Day 1	Day 75	Sent Home
Alasandra	Day 1	Day 32	Walked
Alasandra	Day 49	Day 75	Sent Home
Daya	Day 21	Day 39	Walked
Daya	Day 55	Day 75	Sent Home
Alina	Day 1	Day 38	Walked
Alina	Day 55	Day 75	Sent Home
Raghu	Day 1	Day 32	Walked
Raghu	Day 49	Day 75	Sent Home
Reshma	Day 1	Day 32	Walked
Reshma	Day 55	Day 70	Evicted
Rajith	Day 1	Day 65	Ejected
Veena	Day 1	Day 63	Evicted
Jazla	Day 21	Day 56	Evicted
Sooraj	Day 28	Day 56	Evicted
Manju	Day 1	Day 48	Evicted
Pradeep	Day 1	Day 42	Evicted
Pavan	Day 28	Day 40	Walked
Thesni	Day 1	Day 27	Evicted
Pareekutty	Day 1	Day 21	Evicted
Suresh	Day 1	Day 21	Evicted
Somadas	Day 1	Day 15	Walked
Rajini	Day 1	Day 14	Evicted

== Housemates ==
The participants in the order of appearance and entrance in the house are:

=== Original entrants ===
- Rajini Chandy, Film Actress
- Alina Padikkal, TV Host, TV Actress
- Raghu Subhash, Radio Jockey
- Arya Badai, TV Host
- Saju Navodaya, Film Actor
- Veena Nair, Film & TV Actress
- Manju Pathrose, TV Actress
- Pareekutty Perumbavoor, tiktok, Internet Celebrity, singer
- Thesni Khan, Film Actress
- Rajith Kumar, Social Activist
- Pradeep Chandran, Film & TV Actor
- Fukru (Krishna Jeev), Internet Celebrity
- Reshma Rajan, Model
- Somadas Haridasan, Singer
- Alasandra Johnson, Model
- Sujo Mathew, Model
- Suresh Krishnan, Director

=== Wild card entrants ===
- Daya Ashwathy, Social Activist, Internet Celebrity
- Jazla Madasseri, Social Activist
- Sooraj V V, Radio Jockey
- Pavan Gino Thomas, Model
- Abhirami Suresh, Singer, Actress
- Amrutha Suresh, Singer

== Guests ==
Week(s)	Day(s)	Guest(s)	Purpose of visit
1	Day 6	Dharmajan Bolgatty	Invited guest, disguised as new entrant in front of housemates and was evicted on the same day by Bigg Boss for leaking outside information.
2	Day 74	Mohanlal	To suspend the show due to COVID-19 outbreak

== Nominations table ==
	Week 1	Week 2	Week 3	Week 4	Week 5	Week 6			Week 7	Week 8		Week 9	Week 10	Week 11		
	Week 1	Week 2	Week 3	Week 4	Week 5	Week 6			Week 7	Day 47	Day 51	Week 9	Week 10	Week 11		
House Captain	Rajini	Saju	Pradeep	Fukru	Rajith	Saju						Fukru	Rajith	Fukru		Show discontinued (Day 74)
Captain's Nomination	No; Nominations	Rajith; Sujo	Alasandra; Rajith	Arya; Veena	Pradeep; Reshma	Jasla; Rajith			Rajith; Veena	Jasla	Fukru; Jasla	Abhirami & Amritha; Sujo	Not; Eligible	Abhirami & Amritha; Raghu		Show discontinued (Day 74)
Vote to:	None	Evict											Evict/Save	Evict		Show discontinued (Day 74)
Abhirami & Amritha	Not In House									Entered (Day 49)	Exempt	Arya; Saju	Themselves (to evict)	Alina; Daya	Sent Home (Day 75)	Show discontinued (Day 74)
Alasandra	No; Nominations	Rajini; Somadas	Fukru; Rajith	Pradeep; Veena	Pradeep; Reshma	Walked (Day 32)					Exempt	Abhirami; Amritha; Saju	Herself (to save)	Arya; Saju	Sent Home (Day 75)	Show discontinued (Day 74)
Alina	No; Nominations	Somadas; Thesni	Thesni; Veena	Thesni; Veena	Daya; Veena	Daya; Rajith			Walked (Day 39)			Exempt	Herself (to save)	Abhirami; Amritha; Sujo	Sent Home (Day 75)	Show discontinued (Day 74)
Arya	No; Nominations	Rajith; Somadas	Alina; Pareekutty	Raghu; Rajith	Daya; Raghu	Daya; Rajith			Jasla; Rajith	Jasla	Jasla; Rajith	Abhirami; Amritha; Sujo	Herself (to save)	Alasandra; Raghu	Sent Home (Day 75)	Show discontinued (Day 74)
Daya	Not In House		Entered (Day 21)	Exempt	Pradeep; Saju	Manju; Pradeep			Walked (Day 39)			Exempt	Herself (to evict)	Alasandra; Raghu	Sent Home (Day 75)	Show discontinued (Day 74)
Fukru	No; Nominations	Alina; Rajini	Alasandra; Alina	House; Captain	Daya; Reshma	Jasla; Rajith			Rajith; Veena	Sooraj	Rajith; Veena	House; Captain	Himself (to save)	House; Captain	Sent Home (Day 75)	Show discontinued (Day 74)
Raghu	No; Nominations	Alina; Somadas	Pareekutty; Rajith	Pradeep; Veena	Pradeep; Veena	Walked (Day 32)					Exempt	Saju; Veena	Himself (to evict)	Arya; Daya	Sent Home (Day 75)	Show discontinued (Day 74)
Saju	No; Nominations	House; Captain	Pareekutty; Thesni	Alasandra; Raghu	Daya; Jasla	House; Captain						Alasandra; Raghu	Himself (to evict)	Alasandra; Sujo	Sent Home (Day 75)	Show discontinued (Day 74)
Sujo	No; Nominations	Rajith; Somadas	Pareekutty; Rajith	Pradeep; Veena	Pradeep; Reshma	Walked (Day 32)					Exempt	Saju; Veena	Himself (to save)	Alina; Saju	Sent Home (Day 75)	Show discontinued (Day 74)
Reshma	No; Nominations	Rajini; Somadas	Rajith; Veena	Thesni; Veena	Daya; Fukru	Walked (Day 32)						Exempt	Herself (to evict)	Evicted (Day 70)		Show discontinued (Day 74)
Rajith	No; Nominations	Manju; Suresh	Arya; Reshma	Arya; Saju	House; Captain	Manju; Veena			Fukru; Manju	Sooraj	Fukru; Jasla	Arya; Saju	House; Captain	Ejected (Day 69)		Show discontinued (Day 74)
Veena	No; Nominations	Rajith; Sujo	Alina; Rajith	Raghu; Sujo	Daya; Jasla	Daya; Sooraj			Arya; Rajith	Jasla	Fukru; Rajith	Alasandra; Raghu	Evicted (Day 63)			Show discontinued (Day 74)
Jasla	Not In House		Entered (Day 21)	Exempt	Pradeep; Veena	Daya; Rajith			Manju; Rajith	Not eligible	Arya; Veena	Evicted (Day 63)				Show discontinued (Day 74)
Sooraj	Not In House				Exempt	Arya; Veena			Jasla; Rajith	Not eligible	Rajith; Veena	Evicted (Day 56)				Show discontinued (Day 74)
Manju	No; Nominations	Alina; Rajith	Rajith; Suresh	Raghu; Veena	Daya; Sujo	Daya; Rajith			Rajith; Veena	Sooraj	Evicted (Day 48)					Show discontinued (Day 74)
Pradeep	No; Nominations	Alasandra; Rajith	House; Captain	Rajith; Thesni	Alasandra; Daya	Daya; Rajith			Evicted (Day 42)							Show discontinued (Day 74)
Pavan	Not In House			Entered (Day 28)	Exempt				Walked (Day 40)							Show discontinued (Day 74)
Thesni	No; Nominations	Rajini; Sujo	Pareekutty; Suresh	Arya; Veena	Evicted (Day 27)											Show discontinued (Day 74)
Pareekutty	No; Nominations	Alina; Rajini	Raghu; Saju	Evicted (Day 21)												Show discontinued (Day 74)
Suresh	No; Nominations	Reshma; Somadas	Alasandra; Reshma	Evicted (Day 21)												Show discontinued (Day 74)
Somadas	No; Nominations	Alasandra; Rajini	Walked (Day 15)													Show discontinued (Day 74)
Rajini	House; Captain	Rajith; Somadas	Evicted (Day 14)													Show discontinued (Day 74)
Notes		1			2	3, 4, 5				6, 7		8, 9	10			Show discontinued (Day 74)
Against Public Vote	None	Alasandra; Alina; Rajini; Rajith; Somadas; Sujo	Alasandra; Alina; Pareekutty; Rajith; Reshma; Suresh; Thesni; Veena	Arya; Pradeep; Rajith; Raghu; Thesni; Veena	Daya; Jasla; Pradeep; Reshma; Veena	Arya; Daya; ~~Jasla~~; Manju; Pradeep; Rajith; Sooraj; Veena			Arya; Fukru; Jasla; Manju; Rajith; Veena	Arya; Fukru; Jasla; Rajith; Sooraj; Veena		Abhirami; Amritha; Alasandra; ~~Arya~~; ~~Raghu~~; Saju; Sujo; Veena	Abhirami; Amritha; Daya; Raghu; Reshma; Saju	Abhirami; Amritha; Alasandra; Alina; Arya; Daya; Raghu; Saju; Sujo		Show discontinued (Day 74)
Re-entered	none									Alasandra		Alina	none			Show discontinued (Day 74)
Re-entered	none									Raghu		Daya	none			Show discontinued (Day 74)
Re-entered	none									Sujo		Reshma	none			Show discontinued (Day 74)
Ejected	none												Rajith	none		Show discontinued (Day 74)
Walked	none		Somadas	none		Alasandra	Pavan	Raghu	Alina	none						Show discontinued (Day 74)
Walked	none		Somadas	none		Reshma	Sujo		Daya	none						Show discontinued (Day 74)
Evicted	No Eviction	Rajini	Pareekutty	Thesni	No Eviction	Pradeep			Manju	Sooraj		Veena	Reshma	Eviction Cancelled		Show discontinued (Day 74)
Evicted	No Eviction	Rajini	Suresh	Thesni	No Eviction	Pradeep			Manju	Jazla		Veena	Reshma	Eviction Cancelled		Show discontinued (Day 74)

indicates the house captain.
indicates that the Housemate was directly nominated for eviction.
indicates that the Housemate was immune prior to nominations.
indicates the contestant has been evicted.
indicates the contestant walked out to emergency.

=== Notes ===
- ^Note 1: On Day 15, Somadas walked-off the house due to his poor health conditions.
- ^Note 2: 5 housemates (including a nominated contestant) were hospitalized due to a viral infection, they were given a chance to get cured and move onto next week and so there was no eviction.
- ^Note 3: Due to illness and being hospitalized, Alassandra, Raghu, Pavan and Sujo were exempted from the nomination procedures.
- ^Note 4: After getting nominated on week 6, Jasla used her immunity power to save herself from the nomination.
- ^Note 5: On Day 40, Pavan had very poor health condition and decided to walk-off the house for his further treatment.
- ^Note 6: On Day 46, The housemates nominated Jasla and Sooraj for having weak characters in the house as part of the daily task. Both of them had 3 votes each and they were told to discuss so that one of them will be directly nominated to the Week 8 evictions. At the end, Sooraj stood himself to get nominated.
- ^Note 7: On Day 49, Alassandra, Raghu and Sujo re-entered the house along with two new wild card entries.
- ^Note 8: On Day 55, Alina, Daya and Reshma re-entered the house.
- ^Note 9: After getting nominated on week 9, Arya and Raghu used her immunity power to save herself from the nomination.
- ^Note 10: On Day 65, Bigg Boss temporarily ejected Rajith for violating the rules of the house after physically harming a lady contestant during a task. Later on Day 70, Rajith got ejected permanently after being rejected by Reshma to re-enter in the Bigg Boss house.

== Television viewership rating and viewership ==
Official ratings are taken from BARC India.
(TRP of the episodes telecasting in Asianet only)

Grand Premiere
TVR Rating	Viewers(In Million's)
11.3	27
