= Shanavas Shanu =

Indian television actor

- Born: Manjeri, Malappuram, Kerala, India
- Education: NSS College Manjeri
- Occupation: Actor
- Years active: 2010–present

Shanavas Shanu is an Indian television actor best known for his roles as Rudhran in Kumkumapoovu and Indran in Seetha.

== Biography ==
Shanu was born in Manjeri, Malappuram. He studied at NSS College Manjeri. His mother's name is Mymoona. He has two younger sisters named Shanna and Jimsha Sheri. His father died at a very young age. He is married to Sona and has two children.

== Career ==
Shanu made his television debut in 2010, playing the lead role opposite Nithya Das in Indraneelam. He rose to fame by playing the villainous hero Rudhran in Kumkumapoovu and became a household name among the Malayali audience.

From 2017 to 2019, he played Indran in Seetha. His on-screen chemistry with Swasika created controversy among the younger audience. The pair were known as #Seethendriyam on social networking sites.

In 2018, he debuted as a lead hero in a Malayalam film titled Police Junior, which won him the New Face Award at the Adoor Bhasi Awards in 2019. In 2019, he appeared in the television shows Alliyambal and Thamarathumbi.

He is also a prominent figure in television shows like Star Magic on Flowers TV and Thakarppan Comedy on Mazhavil Manorama.

== Television works ==
Year(s)	Show	Role	Channel	Notes	Ref
2010-2011	Indraneelam	Unni	Surya TV	Television Debut	
2011-2014	Kumkumapoovu	Rudhran	Asianet		
2012	Malakhamar	Sreekanth	Mazhavil Manorama		
2012	Sathyameva Jayathe	Aman	Surya TV		
2015	Vasthavam	Aravind Kumar IPS	Kairali TV		
2015-2016	Mayamohini	Amal	Mazhavil Manorama		
2016	Mizhi Randilum	Vinayan	Surya TV		
2016-2017	Chinthavishtayaya Seetha	Indran	Asianet		
2017-2019	Seetha	Indran	Flowers TV	sequel to Chinthavishtayaya Seetha	
2019	Arayangalude Veedu	Indran	Flowers TV		
2019	Alliyambal	Sreeram	Zee Keralam		
2019-2020	Thamarathumbi	Rajeevan	Surya TV		
2020	Koodathayi	IG Sharath Chandran IPS	Flowers TV		
2021	Aamir	Aamir	ADN Originals		
2021-2022	Mrs. Hitler	Dev Krishna "DK"	Zee Keralam	replaced By Arun G Raghavan	
2022	Kana Kanmani	ASP Dinesh IPS	Surya TV	Guest appearance	
2022	Seethapennu	Indran	Flowers TV	sequel to Seetha	
2023 - 2024	Swayamvaram	Rajeevan	Mazhavil Manorama		
2024 - 2025	Mangalyam	Michael	Zee Keralam		
2025	Bigg Boss 7	Contestant	Asianet	2nd Runner-up; Reality show	

== Filmography ==
Year	Film	Notes
2007	Speed Track	First appearance
2010	Rhythm	
2011	Nadakame Ulakam	
2015	Lasagu	
2016	Angane Thanne Nethave Anchettennam Pinnale	Lead Antagonist
2017	Aakashathinum Bhoomikkumidayil	
2018	Queen	
2018	Police Junior	Debut as a Lead Hero
2019	Big Salute	

== Controversies ==
In Bigg Boss Malayalam season 7, he became the subject of controversy over his remarks on female contestants’ clothing. He advised fellow participant Gizele Thakral to "dress modestly," stating that such presentation was necessary to gain love and votes from the Malayali audience.

The statement drew criticism on social media and in the press, especially when he nominated Gizele for eviction due to this dressing reason with many accusing him of endorsing regressive cultural norms. Netizens labelled him a "Kulapurushan," a Malayalam colloquial term for a conservative, narrow-minded man.

== Awards and nominations ==
- Asianet Television Awards 2012 - Best Popular Actor
- Asiavision Awards - Best Actor
- Adoor Bhasi Awards 2013 - Best Actor
- Thikkirushy Award 2013 - Best Actor
- Johnson Master Memorial Award - Best Actor
- Lohithadas Memorial Awards - Best Actor
- NCP Awards 2019 - Best Actor
- Adoor Bhasi Film awards 2019 - Best Debut
- Mollywood Flick Awards 2021- Best On-Screen Pair with Swasika
