= Bigg Boss (Malayalam TV series) season 7 =

Bigg Boss
- Season 7
- Presented by: Mohanlal
- No. of days: 99
- No. of housemates: 25
- Winner: Anumol RS
- Runner-up: Aneesh Tharayil
- No. of episodes: 99

Release
- Original network: Asianet; JioHotstar
- Original release: 3 August – 9 November 2025

Series chronology
- ← Previous; Season 6 Next → Season 8

The seventh season of Bigg Boss, the Malayalam-language edition of the Indian reality television series of the same name, premiered on 3 August 2025. Produced by Endemol Shine India and Banijay, the show is broadcast on Asianet and live streamed (deferred) on JioHotstar. Mohanlal hosts the season for the consecutive seventh year.

== Production ==
Creative Team: Arjun Menon is the Project Head of this show. The show is produced by Endemol Shine Group. Riya Cheriyan is the Creative Director.Abhilash is the associate Creative Director also handle Task and PCR.Saif Mohammad is the Associate Creative Director(post production )Vineesh Nair, Anoop Prakash, Pearl, and Shruthi are the Episode Directors.

=== Development ===
The season was initially expected to premiere in March 2025, following the pattern of previous seasons. However, reports suggested a delay due to various factors, including selection of contestants and the host Mohanlal's commitments to his films L2: Empuraan and Thudarum . Earlier reports indicated a potential premiere in June 2025. It premiered on 3 August 2025.

=== Eye logo ===
The official logo of the seventh edition was unveiled on 21 May 2025 coinciding with host Mohanlal's birthday.

The logo features a vibrant blend of pink magenta, purple, and dark blue hues. At its center is the franchise's iconic 'eye' symbol, surrounded by seven jewel-like elements that represent the season number. A stylized number '7' (or "L" as in Lalettan) is also prominently incorporated within the design, indicating the edition of the show.

=== House location ===
Unlike previous seasons, which utilized sets in Mumbai and Chennai, Season 7 introduced a new house constructed specifically for the Malayalam version in Chennai. This move aimed to provide a dedicated space for the show, aligning with the practices of other language versions of Bigg Boss.

== Housemate status ==
Sr	Housemate	Day entered	Day exited	Status
1	Anumol	Day 0	Day 98	Winner
2	Aneesh	Day 0	Day 98	1st Runner-up
3	Shanavas	Day 0	Day 81	Hospitalized
3	Shanavas	Day 84	Day 98	2nd Runner-up
4	Nevin	Day 0	Day 24	Walked
4	Nevin	Day 25	Day 98	3rd Runner-up
5	Akbar	Day 0	Day 98	4th Runner-up
6	Noora	Day 0	Day 96	Evicted
7	Adhila	Day 0	Day 95	Evicted
8	Sabuman	Day 27	Day 91	Evicted
9	Aryan	Day 0	Day 84	Evicted
10	Lakshmi	Day 27	Day 77	Evicted
11	Binny	Day 0	Day 70	Evicted
12	Gizele	Day 0	Day 63	Evicted
13	Oneal	Day 0	Day 11	Dead Zone
13	Oneal	Day 14	Day 62	Evicted
14	Abhilash	Day 0	Day 56	Evicted
15	Jishin	Day 27	Day 56	Evicted
16	Rena	Day 0	Day 49	Evicted
17	Mastani	Day 27	Day 42	Evicted
18	Praveen	Day 27	Day 42	Evicted
19	Shaitya	Day 0	Day 35	Evicted
20	Sarath	Day 0	Day 34	Evicted
21	Renu	Day 0	Day 34	Walked
22	Sarika	Day 0	Day 11	Dead Zone
22	Sarika	Day 13	Day 21	Evicted
23	Sariga	Day 0	Day 20	Evicted
24	Bincy	Day 0	Day 13	Evicted
25	Ranjeet	Day 0	Day 7	Evicted

== Housemates ==
The participants are given below in the order of their entrance into the Bigg Boss House.

=== Original entrants ===
- Aneesh Tharayil – Writer, farmer, and government employee (commoner).
- Anumol RS – Television actress and anchor.
- Aryan Kathuria – Model and actor from Mumbai, recognized for his role in the film Vadakkan.
- Kalabhavan Sariga P G – Comedy artist and Malayalam folk singer.
- Akbar Khan – Playback singer and live stage performer.
- RJ Bincy – Radio jockey and television anchor.
- Oneal Sabu – Lawyer-turned-food vlogger, culinary specialist.
- Binny Sebastian – Physician and television actress known for being in TV Series Geeta Govindam.
- Abhilash S – Social media influencer and television actor known for being in TV Series Kaathodu Kaathoram.
- Rena Fathima – Social media content creator.
- Ranjeet Munshi – Comedian, film and television actor known for his role in Munshi
- Gizele Thakral – Model, entrepreneur, actress and former contestant on Bigg Boss Hindi season 9.
- Sarika K B – Television anchor and interviewer.
- Shanavas Shanu – Television actor known for his roles in Kumkumapoovu and Seetha.
- Nevin Cappresious – Fashion Stylist and Choreographer.
- Adhila Nasarin – LGBTQ+ rights advocate, Noora's partner, IT professional, content creator.
- Noora Fathima – LGBTQ+ rights advocate, Adhila's partner, IT professional, content creator.
- Shaitya Santhosh – lawyer and reality television personality.
- Renu Sudhi – Social media personality known for acting videos and photoshoots; wife of late actor Kollam Sudhi.
- Appani Sarath – Actor, recognized for his role in the film Angamaly Diaries, Velipadinte Pusthakam, Antony.

=== Wildcard entrants ===
- Jishin Mohan – Television actor.
- Anwara Sulthana (aka Mastani) – Online media personality.
- Praveen. P (aka Marketing Mallu) – Social media content creator.
- Akash Sabu (aka Sabuman) – Dancer and social media content creator.
- Lakshmi Harikrishnan (Vedlakshmi) – Actress, architect and social media content creator.

== Guest appearances ==
Week(s)	Day(s)	Guest(s)	Purpose of visits
Week 1	Day 0	Mohanlal	To introduce the season 7 Bigg Boss house.
Week 1	Day 0	Reneesha Rahiman (Season 5 contestant)	Instructor of Bigg Boss launch task.
Week 4	Day 28	Ramya Nambeesan, Justin Varghese	Asianet Onam celebration launch.
Week 5	Day 34	Mohanlal	To celebrate Onam with the housemates
Week 6	Day 37	Akhil Marar, Cerena Ann Johnson (season 5 contestants), Abhishek Sreekumar (season 6 contestant),Nisarg Mohandas	To promote their film Midnight in Mullankolli.
Week 7	Day 44-45	Shiyas Kareem (season 1 contestant), Shobha Vishwanath season 5 contestant)	Guests for the Bigg Boss Hotel task.
Week 7	Day 45-46	Riyas Salim (season 4 contestant)	Guests for the Bigg Boss Hotel task.
Week 8	Day 50	Asif Ali, Aparna Balamurali, Jeethu Joseph and Arjun Syam Gopan (season 6 contestant)	To promote their film Mirage.
Week 8	Day 54	Jeevan Gopal, Suphy Maria	To promote their sitcom Happy Couples.
Week 9	Day 57-60	Guest(s) / Contestant(s) / Relation / Day(s); Suhana & Nasna / Shanavas / Wife & Daughter / Day 57; Annie & Abeesh / Aneesh / Mother & Brother / Day 57; Noobin / Binny / Husband / Day 57-60; Rahmath & Sherin / Akbar / Mother & Wife / Day 58; Diya & Jasmine / Adhila & Noora / Friends / Day 58; Sabu & Sheeba / Sabuman / Father & Mother / Day 58; Ponnamma / Gizele / Mother / Day 59; Dimple & Tharush / Aryan / Mother & Brother / Day 59; Ramani & Arya / Anumol / Mother & Sister / Day 59; Latha / Lakshmi / Mother / Day 60; Jeseentha & Navya / Nevin / Mother & Sister / Day 60; Blosome & Datu / Oneal / Mother & Brother / Day 60	Family Week
Week 10	Day 66-67	Sabumon Abdusamad (season 1 contestant)	Guest for the Bigg Boss Secret task
Week 14	Day 92-96	Appani Sarath, Sariga PG, Sarika KB, Ranjith Munshi, Shaitya, RJ Bincy	Reunion with the Finalists
Week 14	Day 93-96	Jishin Mohan, Praveen, Rena Fathima, Abhilash, Mastani	Reunion with the Finalists
Week 14	Day 94-96	Oneal Sabu, Lakshmi Harikrishnan, Renu Sudhi, Aryan Kathuria, Binny Sebastian, Sabuman, Gizele Thakral	Reunion with the Finalists
Week 14	Day 96	Sivaangi Krishnakumar	Performance for finalists and ex-housemates
Week 14	Day 97	Parvathy, Kaushik, Nithin, and Tessa	To promote their Asianet serials Advocate Anjali and Kattathe Kilikoodu
Week 14	Day 99	Job Kurian	Wakeup song and performance on stage
Week 14	Day 99	Ranjeet Munshi, RJ Bincy, Kalabhavan Sariga, Sarika KB, Renu Sudhi, Appani Sarath, Shaitya Santhosh, Praveen, Mastani, Rena Fathima, Jishin Mohan, Abhilash, Oneal Sabu, Gizele Thakral, Binny Sebastian, Lakshmi Harikrishnan, Aryan Kathuria, Sabuman, Adhila Nasarin, Noora Fathima	Stage performance and gallery
Week 14	Day 99	Mohanlal	To bring the final two on stage.
Week 14	Day 99	K.S. Chithra and young Star Singer contestants	Performance on stage
Week 14	Day 99	Jagadish, Akhil Kutty, Noby Marcose, and 3 others	Skit (on stage)
Week 14	Day 99	Kishen Kumar (Channel head Asianet)	To announce the winner
Week 14	Day 99	Vibin Shivadas (CEO of Regal Jewellers)	To announce the winner and to give his prize to the Regal Jewellers contest winner
Week 14	Day 99	A.K. Shaji (myG Chairman)	To announce the winner and give the runners-up their gifts
Week 14	Day 99	Dr. CJ Roy (CEO of Confident Group)	To announce the winner and to give the winner's prize money

== Weekly summary ==
Week 1	Entrances	On Day 0: During the grand premiere on 3 August 2025, hosted by Mohanlal, a total of 20 housemates entered the Bigg Boss house. The contestants, introduced in sequence, were: Aneesh Tharayil, Anumol RS, Aryan Kathuria, Sariga Kalabhavan, Akbar Khan, RJ Bincy, Oneal Sabu, Dr. Binny Sebastian, Abhilash S, Rena Fathima, Ranjeet Munshi, Gizele Thakral, Sarika KB, Shanavas Shanu, Nevin Cappresious, Adhila Nasarin, Noora Fathima, Shaitya Santhosh, Renu Sudhi, and Sarath Appani.
Week 1	House Captain	Aneesh Tharayil
Week 1	Nominations	On Days 2: Anumol, Aryan, Gizele, Nevin, Ranjeet, Renu, Sarika, and Shaitya were nominated for eviction in the first week.
Week 1	Task	Captaincy Task: On Day 1: All housemates were instructed to nominate two contestants whom they believed should not be eligible for captaincy by applying shaving foam to their faces. However, it was later revealed that the housemates who received the most nominations would, in fact, become the contenders for captaincy. Aneesh Tharayil won the subsequent task and was appointed as the House Captain for Week 1.
Week 1	Task	Weekly task: On Days 3–4: Bhagyathinte Panipetti; Contestants were required to collect colored coins hidden inside a box. Each coin carried a point value, with some offering advantages or disadvantages. Contestants who collected black coins received minor punishments, while those who found gold coins were initially granted powers related to nominations, although one such contestant was later deemed ineligible for the benefit. A special destiny coin awarded an undisclosed power to its holder.
Week 1	Jail	On Day 5 : The housemates voted for Anumol & Sarath and they were sent to jail.
Week 1	Exits	On Day 7: Ranjeet Munshi evicted from the Bigg Boss House after facing public voting.
Week 2
Week 2	House Captain	Shanavas Shanu
Week 2	Nominations	On Day 8 (Part 1): Aneesh Tharayil, Oneal Sabu, Rena Fathima, Renu Sudhi, Sariga Kalabhavan, and Sarika K. B. were nominated for the mid-week eviction process.; On Day 8 (Part 2): Adhila Nasarin, Noora Fathima, Akbar Khan, Anumol R. S., Aryan Kathuria, RJ Bincy, Dr. Binny Sebastian, Gizele Thakral, Nevin Cappresious, Sarath Appani, Shaitya Santhosh, and Shanavas Shanu were nominated for the second week's eviction process
Week 2	Task	Captaincy Task: On Day 5: Following a house-wide vote, Abhilash, Dr. Binny Sebastian, and Shanavas Shanu were selected as the contenders for the Week 2 captaincy task.
Week 2	Task	Mid-week Eviction Task: On Day 8: Six contestants, Aneesh Tharayil, Oneal Sabu, Rena Fathima, Renu Sudhi, Kalabhavan Sariga, and Sarika K. B. were nominated for a mid-week eviction. The nominated housemates participated in a series of strategic, team-based tasks, including: Coin Vetta: Nominees selected teammates to earn points through physical and strategic challenges.; Cold War: A task requiring housemates to stock a refrigerator with common household items; several contestants misinterpreted the rules.; Kaliyarangu: A performance-based task where nominees acted as judges for skits performed by fellow housemates.; Kayyookkullavan Kaaryakkaran: A buzzer-based game allowing contestants to steal points from each other; during this task, Aneesh stole 11 points from Oneal.; Housemate / Mid-Week Eviction Points; Housemate / Task 1 (Day 9) / Task 2 (Day 10) / Task 3 (Day 11) / Task 4 - Round 1 (bonus points) / Task 4 - Round 2 (bonus points) / Total; Aneesh / 1 / 3 / 2 / +9 / +2 / 17; Oneal / 3 / 6 / 4 / -9 / -2 / 2; Rena / 6 / 5 / 3 / 0 / 0 / 14; Renu / 4 / 4 / 5 / 0 / 0 / 13; Sariga / 5 / 2 / 6 / 0 / 0 / 13; Sarika K B / 2 / 1 / (Disqualified) / 0 / 0 / 3; On Day 11: Oneal Sabu and Sarika K. B. were temporarily suspended from the main house and moved to a secret room known as the "Dead Zone" for a period of 48 hours.
Week 2	Jail	On Day 12 : The housemates voted for Nevin, Renu & Sariga PG and they were sent to jail.
Week 2	Exits	On Day 13: RJ Bincy evicted from the Bigg Boss House after facing public voting.
Week 3
Week 3	Task	Panippura On Days 16–18: A multi-day task was conducted, in which the housemates were divided into two teams. The teams competed in a series of sub-tasks, including Yum-Yuck, Animal, and debates to gain access to the Panippura area and retrieve their personal belongings.
Week 3	Task	Captaincy Task On Day 22: 3 selected contestants were each asked to stand within individual circles containing toy hens. The objective was to throw all the hens from their own circle into the circles of the other two contestants. If any toy hen landed outside the designated circles, the contestant was required to retrieve it and throw it again. At the end of the task, the contestant whose circle contained no hens or the fewest—was declared the House Captain for the week.
Week 3	House Captain	Aryan Kathuria
Week 3	Nominations	On Day 15: Akbar, Anumol, Oneal, Rena, Sarath, Sariga PG, Sarika KB, Shaitya, Shanavas were nominated for the third week's eviction process
Week 3	Exits	On Days 20–21: Sariga P G and Sarika K B were evicted from the Bigg Boss House after facing public voting.
Week 4
Week 4	Entrances	On Day 27: During the weekend episode on 30 August 2025, hosted by Mohanlal, additional 5 housemates entered the Bigg Boss house as Wildcard entrants. The contestants were: Jishin Mohan, Mastani, Ved Lakshmi, Praveen P, Sabuman.
Week 4	Task	Swetchathipathi On Days 22–25: The task granted complete control of the house to two selected contestants, who acted as rulers during the task period. Similar to monarchs, these contestants held the authority to make decisions and command the other housemates throughout the duration of the task.
Week 4	Task	Captaincy Task On Day 27: 3 selected contestants were tied together by their legs with a rope and competed against each other. The contestant who untied the rope first was declared the House Captain.
Week 4	House Captain	Appani Sarath
Week 4	Nominations	On Day 22: Abhilash, Adhila, Aryan, Binny, Noora, Oneal, Renu were nominated for the fourth week's eviction process
Week 4	Exits	No eviction took place.
Week 5
Week 5	Task	Kireedayudham On Days 30–32: The task involved contestants being divided into teams, with the objective of protecting their own caps while attempting to snatch the caps of opposing teams.
Week 5	Task	Captaincy Task On Day 36: 3 selected contestants were each given a box containing balls of four mixed colors. The task required them to quickly separate and arrange the balls by color into four distinct lines. The contestant who completed the arrangement fastest was declared the Week 6 House Captain.
Week 5	House Captain	Nevin Cappresious
Week 5	Nominations	On Day 26: Akbar, Binny, Oneal, Rena, Aryan, Renu, Shaitya, Shanavas, Adhila, Noora, Sharath, Abhilash, Anumol, Aneesh and Gizele were nominated for the fifth week's eviction process
Week 5	Exits	On Day 34: Renu Sudhi voluntarily walked out of the Bigg Boss house after repeatedly requesting to leave the show. On Days 34–35: Appani Sarath and Shaitya Santhosh were evicted from the Bigg Boss House after facing public voting.
Week 6
Week 6	Task	Noodila Shoe Factory On Days 37–39: The first task involved contestants acting as factory workers tasked with producing a specific number of chappals for the factory owner, Noora Fathima. The owner rewarded contestants with gold coins for best performance and black coins for weaker efforts. The second task was a circus-themed challenge, where contestants performed skits and were similarly awarded coins based on their performances.
Week 6	Task	Captaincy Task On Day 43: Selected contestants were each given a box full of stickers and tasked with running in lines to paste the stickers onto a board placed at a distance. The contestant who pasted the most stickers on the board was declared the House Captain for the week.
Week 6	House Captain	Abhilash
Week 6	Nominations	On Day 36: Aryan, Praveen, Lakshmi, Mastani, Sabuman, Akbar, Nevin, Aneesh, Abhilash, Anumol, Rena, Binny, Adhila were nominated for the sixth week's eviction process
Week 6	Exits	On Day 42: Praveen and Masthani were evicted from the Bigg Boss House after facing public voting.
Week 7
Week 7	Task	BB Hotel On Days 44–46: The Bigg Boss house was transformed into a hotel for the task titled BB Hotel. Housemates were assigned various staff roles, including Manager, Chief Chef, Assistant Chef, Security Guard, Housekeeping, Waiters, Janitor, Assistant Janitor, and Entertainment Performers. Additionally, a guest portrayed a bankrupted visitor who was required to follow instructions from the Manager and Chief Chef. Throughout the task, surprise guests from outside visited the hotel and provided tips to the housemates based on their performance.
Week 7	Task	Captaincy Task On Day 47: 3 selected contestants were each given a podium with sheets of paper and tasked with making paper airplanes. The playing area was divided into three airport zones: Trivandrum, Kochi, and Kannur, each awarding different points based on distance. Contestants earned points by landing their airplanes in these zones, and the participant with the highest total score was declared the House Captain for the following week.
Week 7	House Captain	Jishin Mohan
Week 7	Nominations	On Day 43: Adhila, Aryan, Binny, Lakshmi, Nevin, Noora, Rena, Sabuman, Shanavas were nominated for the seventh week's eviction process
Week 7	Exits	On Day 49: Rena Fathima was evicted from the Bigg Boss House after facing public voting.
Week 8
Week 8	Task	Bottle Factory On Days 51–53: The housemates took on roles as juice-factory owners, bottle agents, and quality inspectors. The task involved cleaning empty bottles, filling them with juice, and getting them approved by quality inspectors to earn points. Multiple factories, Orange, Lemon, and later Mango, competed, and housemates had to manage production, ensure quality, and complete the process within the time limit.
Week 8	Task	Captaincy Task On Day 57, selected contestants were given three boards with the word CAPTAIN on each board. A common box containing shuffled letters was placed for all contestants, while the letter N was placed separately on a podium. Contestants had to quickly run and fill in the letters, and the one who completed the word CAPTAI first could take the letter N from the podium and place it on the board to become the captain for the next week.
Week 8	House Captain	Oneal Sabu
Week 8	Nominations	On Day 50: Abhilash, Adhila, Akbar, Aneesh, Aryan, Binny, Gizele, Jishin, Lakshmi, Sabuman and Shanavas were nominated for the eighth week's eviction process
Week 8	Exits	On Day 56: Abhilash S and Jishin Mohan were evicted from the Bigg Boss House after facing public voting.
Week 9
Week 9	Task	Family Week Task During Days 57 to 60, the family members of the contestants visited the Bigg Boss house on separate days. In order to earn the opportunity to meet their loved ones, contestants were required to complete specific tasks. Each contestant first undertook a common task: solving a puzzle board by correctly assembling pieces to reveal either a family photo or a Bigg Boss poster. Following this, each contestant was assigned a unique individual task.: Day 57: Shanavas & Aneesh: Held a scale in their mouth, balanced dice on it, and dropped them into a bowl.; Day 58: Akbar: Arranged plates and glasses alternately (plate–glass–plate–glass) in a tub of water.; Adhila & Noora: Flipped matchboxes into bowls, ensuring one landed in each.; Sabuman: Threw balls into glasses.; Day 59: Gizele: Built a pyramid using soft drink cans with the help of a stick.; Aryan: Moved biscuits from forehead to mouth without using hands.; Anumol: Arranged bricks in a line and toppled them to roll a ball into a box.; Day 60: Lakshmi: Blew ping pong balls across ten water-filled glasses, placing one ball in each glass.; Oneal: Slid balls along a rope into three pots, one per pot.; Nevin: Shook his head to swing teabags, attached to three hats, in a crisscross motion.
Week 9	Task	Captaincy Task Each selected contestant is tied with a long ribbon. They must move around to free themselves. The one who unties the ribbon first and plants the flag labeled "CAPTAIN" in the given mud bowl will become the captain for the next week.
Week 9	House Captain	Dr. Binny Sebastian
Week 9	Nominations	On Day 57: Adhila, Anumol, Noora, Nevin, Sabuman, Lakshmi, Gizele and Oneal were nominated for the ninth week's eviction process
Week 9	Exits	On Days 62-63: Oneal Sabu and Gizele Thakral were evicted from the Bigg Boss House after facing public voting.
Week 10
Week 10	Task	BB Dance Marathon On Days 64–67: The contestants were given roles and costumes of versatile Malayalam film characters and they have to behave resembling that characters and dance competition forming groups will be held. Those who gain maximum gold coins through the performance will be given immunity powers.
Week 10	Task	Secret Task On Day 66: A selected contestant should secretly eat food from the activity area. Gradually, the task expands to five contestants, each completing the food step by step. In the final stage, along with finishing food they have to bring a stranger from the activity area into the house and hide him, all while keeping the task completely secret from other housemates.
Week 10	Task	Captaincy Task The three chosen contestants are given one rope, and each must hold a specific point — the beginning, middle, or end. Whoever maintains their hold the longest without any movement will be selected as the captain for the upcoming week.
Week 10	House Captain	Adhila Nasarin
Week 10	Nominations	On Day 64: Anumol, Akbar, Aneesh, Binny, Lakshmi, Nevin, Sabuman and Shanavas were nominated for the tenth week's eviction process
Week 10	Exits	On Day 70: Dr. Binny Sebastian was evicted from the Bigg Boss House after facing public voting.
Week 11
Week 11	Task	Weekly Task On Days 72-74: The contestants have to complete 3 tasks on 3 different days so as to secure points and those who score maximum points will have some special advantages for Ticket to Finale Task. Day 72: Parakkum Thalika, Red and yellow balls will randomly fall from the sky whenever a siren sounds and contestants need to collect it. Each red ball is worth 3 points and each yellow ball is worth 1 point. Day 73: Paavashasthram, Parts of toys will be released from a machine, and contestants must assemble them to create complete toys. They must also guard their toys from being stolen by others. After three rounds, the total number of completed toys will be counted and each toy is worth 5 points. Day 74: Scratch & Win, Several scratch cards are hidden throughout the house. In this buzzer-to-buzzer round, contestants must search for and scratch the cards they find. Some cards award 1 or 2 points, while others contain traps. Weekly Task Points: Rank / Contestant / Task 1 / Task 2 / Task 3 / Total Points; 1 / Aryan / 65 / 145 / 51 / 261; 2 / Aneesh / 60 / 120 / 18 / 198; 3 / Anumol / 27 / 120 / 41 / 188; 4 / Nevin / 24 / 95 / 30 / 149; 5 / Adhila / 27 / 90 / 16 / 133; 6 / Lakshmi / 33 / 60 / 22 / 115; 7 / Shanavas / 48 / 0 / 59 / 107; 8 / Noora / 29 / 20 / 46 / 95; 9 / Akbar / 59 / 0 / 31 / 90; 10 / Sabuman / 40 / 0 / 29 / 69
Week 11	Task	Seceret Task On Day 75: A selected contestant must secretly convince five other contestants to vote for the person they want to nominate for a prank eviction, without revealing it to the target or three other contestants.
Week 11	Task	Captaincy Task 3 chosen contestants were directly selected as Captains of next week without any immunities like saving from eviction.
Week 11	House Captain	Sabuman
Week 11	Nominations	On Day 71: Akbar, Aryan, Lakshmi, Nevin, Noora and Shanavas were nominated for the eleventh week's eviction process
Week 11	Exits	On Day 77: Ved Lakshmi was evicted from the Bigg Boss House after facing public voting.
Week 12
Week 12	Task	Ticket To Finale On Days 78–82: All the housemates need to participate in all of the tasks part of the Ticket to Finale. All the housemates receive points on how they play each task given. Eventually, the housemate with the most points at the end wins the ticket to the finale and enters the Finale Week without getting evicted.: Contestant / Task 0 / Task 1 / Task 2 / Task 3 / Task 4 / Task 5 / Task 6 / Task 7 / Task 8 / Total; Noora / 0 / 7 / 9 / 6 / 8 / 9 / 4 / 8 / 7 / 56; Aryan / 0 / 9 / 2 / 9 / 9 / 5 / 5 / 4 / 8 / 51; Akbar / 0 / 4 / 4 / 8 / 7 / 4 / 7 / 5 / 6 / 45; Nevin / 1 / 2 / 8 / 7 / 3 / 8 / 3 / 7 / 1 / 40; Anumol / 0 / 6 / 6 / 1 / 6 / 1 / 8 / 2 / 4 / 34; Aneesh / 0 / 3 / 1 / 5 / 4 / 6 / 6 / 6 / 3 / 34; Sabuman / 0 / 8 / 5 / 2 / 4 / 3 / 2 / 1 / 2 / 27; Adhila / 0 / 5 / 3 / 3 / 5 / 2 / 1 / 3 / 3 / 25; Shanavas / 0 / 1 / 7 / 4 / 1 / – / – / – / – / 13; Noora Fathima received the most points and won the Ticket to Finale and got entry to the Finale Week
Week 12	Task	Captaincy Task The Ticket to Finale winner Noora Fathima is directly selected as captain of next week.
Week 12	House Captains	Aryan Kathuria, Akbar Khan and Nevin Cappresious
Week 12	Nominations	On Day 78: Aneesh, Akbar, Aryan, Anumol, Nevin, Noora and Sabuman were nominated for the twelfth week's eviction process
Week 12	Exits	On Day 84: Aryan Kathuria was evicted from the Bigg Boss House after facing public voting.
Week 13
Week 13	Task	Bigg Bank Week On Days 86-88: The contestants were given a series of tasks collect money and which will be debited from Winner's price money, through which contestant can collect maximum amount by winning tasks.
Week 13	House Captain	Noora Fathima
Week 13	Nominations	On Day 85: Aneesh, Akbar, Adhila, Anumol, Nevin, Sabuman and Shanavas were nominated for the thirteenth week's eviction process
Week 13	Exits	On Day 91: Sabuman was evicted from the Bigg Boss House after facing public voting.
Week 14
Week 14	Nominations	On Day 92: Aneesh, Akbar, Adhila, Anumol, Nevin, Noora, and Shanavas were nominated for the finale voting process.
Week 14	Exits	On Day 95-97: Adhila Nasarin and Noora Fathima were evicted from the Bigg Boss House after facing public voting.
Week 14	4th Runner up	Day 98: Akbar Khan (won myG gift JBL party box)
Week 14	3rd Runner up	Day 98: Nevin Cappresious (won myG gift Liebherr Double Door refrigerator)
Week 14	2nd Runner up	Day 98: Shanavas Shanu (won myG gift Samsung Galaxy Z Fold7)
Week 14	1st Runner up	Day 98: Aneesh Tharayil (won myG gift Samsung Galaxy Z Fold7)
Week 14	Winner	Day 98: Anumol RS (won Maruti Suzuki Victoris and ₹42,55,210 cash prize)

== Nomination table ==
	Week 1	Week 2	Week 3	Week 4		Week 5	Week 6	Week 7	Week 8		Week 9	Week 10	Week 11	Week 12	Week 13	Week 14			
	Week 1	Week 2	Week 3	Week 4		Week 5	Week 6	Week 7	Week 8		Week 9	Week 10	Week 11	Week 12	Week 13	Finale			
Nominees for House captaincy	All Housemates	Abhilash; Binny; Shanavas	Abhilash; Aryan; Gizele	Binny; Sarath; Shaitya		Binny; Nevin; Rena	Abhilash; Gizele; Oneal	Jishin; Oneal; Rena	Adhila; Gizele; Oneal		Akbar; Aryan; Binny	Adhila; Gizele; Lakshmi	Sabuman; Aryan; Anumol	Aryan; Akbar; Nevin	None				
House captain	Aneesh	Shanavas	Aryan	Sarath		Nevin	Abhilash	Jishin	Oneal		Binny	Adhila	Sabuman	Aryan; Akbar; Nevin	Noora	No Captain			
BB Prison	Anumol; Sarath	Nevin; Renu; Sariga PG	Gizele; Oneal	Aneesh; Anumol	Anumol; Gizele	Anumol; Gizele	Gizele; Lakshmi	Rena; Shanavas	Jishin; Nevin	Adhila; Aneesh	Shanavas; Aneesh	Aneesh; Lakshmi	Anumol; Aneesh	Nevin; Akbar	Noora Sabuman	None			
Vote to:	Evict																WIN		
Anumol	Gizele; Ranjeet	Binny; Nevin	Akbar; Gizele	Not eligible		Akbar; Rena	Adhila; Akbar	Aryan; Sabuman	Lakshmi; Sabuman		Sabuman; Lakshmi	Sabuman; Nevin	Aryan; Nevin	Nevin; Akbar	Nominated	Nominated	Finalist	Winner (Day 98)	
Aneesh	Anumol; Sarika KB	Sarath; Shaitya	Binny; Sarath	Noora; Renu		Sarath; Shaitya	Not eligible	Not eligible	Adhila; Lakshmi		Nevin; Oneal	Shanavas; Binny	Shanavas; Noora	Sabuman; Noora	Nominated	Nominated	Finalist	1st runner-up (Day 98)	
Shanavas	Abhilash; Gizele	Aryan; Sarath	Rena; Sarath	Akbar; Binny		Akbar; Sarath	Anumol; Nevin	Lakshmi; Nevin	Abhilash; Binny		Nevin; Anumol	Lakshmi; Binny	Akbar; Aryan	Aryan; Anumol	Nominated	Nominated	Finalist	2nd runner-up (Day 98)	
Nevin	Anumol; Renu	Adhila & Noora; Bincy	Akbar; Sarika KB	Abhilash		Sarath; Shanavas	Abhilash; Akbar	Adhila; Shanavas	Adhila; Shanavas		Sabuman; Gizele	Anumol; Aneesh	Sabuman; Akbar	Anumol; Sabuman	Nominated	Nominated	Finalist	3rd runner-up (Day 98)	
Akbar	Adhila & Noora; Ranjeet	Nevin; Shaitya	Sarika KB; Shanavas	Oneal; Renu		Aneesh; Shanavas	Aneesh; Anumol	Adhila; Lakshmi	Aneesh; Jishin		Noora; Lakshmi	Aneesh; Lakshmi	Shanavas; Noora	Adhila; Noora	Nominated	Nominated	Finalist	4th runner-up (Day 98)	
Noora	Aryan; Shaitya	Aryan; Gizele	Nevin; Sarika KB	Not eligible		Rena; Sarath	Aryan	Lakshmi; Nevin	Akbar		Nevin; Oneal	Akbar; Nevin	Nevin; Lakshmi	Akbar; Aryan	TTF; Winner	Nominated	Evicted (Day 97)		
Adhila	Aryan; Shaitya	Aryan; Gizele	Nevin; Sarika KB	Nominated		Rena; Sarath	Abhilash; Binny	Lakshmi; Nevin	Aneesh; Jishin		Lakshmi; Oneal	Akbar; Binny	Shanavas; Lakshmi	Akbar; Aneesh	Nominated	Nominated	Evicted (Day 95)		
Sabuman	Not In House			Entered (Day 27)		Akbar; Shaitya	Aneesh; Shanavas	Aryan; Rena	Aneesh; Jishin		Anumol; Adhila	Akbar; Anumol	Akbar; Nevin	Nevin; Aneesh	Nominated	Evicted (Day 91)			
Aryan	Nevin; Shaitya	Binny; Nevin	Abhilash; Shanavas	Noora; Oneal		Aneesh; Shanavas	Adhila; Anumol	Binny; Rena	Aneesh; Binny		Adhila; Anumol	Aneesh; Shanavas	Anumol; Noora	Aneesh; Shanavas	Evicted (Day 84)				
Lakshmi	Not In House			Entered (Day 28)		Shaitya; Shanavas	Adhila; Rena	Adhila; Sabuman	Gizele; Jishin		Adhila; Noora	Shanavas; Anumol	Adhila; Akbar	Evicted (Day 77)					
Binny	Ranjeet; Shaitya	Anumol; Adhila & Noora	Oneal; Shaitya	Oneal; Renu		Aneesh; Shanavas	Adhila; Nevin	Aryan; Sabuman	Aryan; Gizele		Aneesh; Gizele	Shanavas; Sabuman	Evicted (Day 70)						
Gizele	Renu; Sarika KB	Anumol; Binny	Adhila & Noora; Anumol	Adhila		Aneesh; Shaitya	Abhilash; Adhila	Binny; Rena	Abhilash; Binny		Noora; Lakshmi	Evicted (Day 63)							
Oneal	Gizele; Shaitya	Binny; Sarath	Sariga PG; Sarika KB	Noora; Rena		Rena; Sarath	Adhila; Binny	Binny; Rena	Jishin; Shanavas		Gizele; Lakshmi	Evicted (Day 62)							
Abhilash	Aryan; Renu	Gizele; Sarath	Sarath; Sariga PG	Nominated		Akbar; Rena	Adhila; Binny	Gizele; Shanavas	Aryan; Lakshmi		Evicted (Day 56)								
Jishin	Not In House			Entered (Day 27)		Aneesh; Shaitya	Binny; Rena	Lakshmi; Sabuman	Anumol; Sabuman		Evicted (Day 56)								
Rena	Nevin; Shaitya	Bincy; Shaitya	Sarika KB; Shaitya	Noora; Oneal		Sarath; Shaitya	Abhilash; Anumol	Oneal; Shanavas	Evicted (Day 49)										
Mastani	Not In House			Entered (Day 27)		Sarath; Shanavas	Gizele; Rena	Evicted (Day 42)											
Praveen	Not In House			Entered (Day 27)		Rena; Shaitya	Binny; Rena	Evicted (Day 42)											
Shaitya	Binny; Ranjeet	Adhila & Noora; Gizele	Akbar; Rena	Not eligible		Akbar; Sarath	Evicted (Day 35)												
Sarath	Nevin; Shanavas	Nevin; Shaitya	Oneal; Shaitya	Binny; Oneal		Aneesh; Shanavas	Evicted (Day 34)												
Renu	Akbar; Shaitya	Gizele; Sarath	Oneal; Sarath	Not eligible		Akbar; Rena	Walked (Day 34)												
Sarika KB	Ranjeet; Renu	Anumol; Shaitya	Anumol; Shaitya	Evicted (Day 21)															
Sariga PG	Aryan; Oneal	Abilash; Aryan	Anumol; Renu	Evicted (Day 20)															
Bincy	Nevin; Shaitya	Anumol; Shaitya	Evicted (Day 13)																
Ranjeet	Gizele; Shaitya	Evicted (Day 7)																	
Notes	1, 2	3, 4, 5		6															
Against public vote	Anumol; Aryan; Gizele; Nevin; Ranjeet; Renu; Sarika KB; Shaitya	Adhila & Noora; Akbar; Anumol; Aryan; Bincy; Binny; Gizele; Nevin; Sarath; Shaitya; Shanavas	Akbar; Anumol; Oneal; Rena; Sarath; Sariga PG; Sarika KB; Shaitya; Shanavas	Abhilash; Adhila; Aryan; Binny; Noora; Oneal; Renu		Abhilash; Adhila; Akbar; Aneesh; Anumol; Aryan; Binny; Gizele; Noora; Oneal; Rena; Renu; Sarath; Shaitya; Shanavas	Abhilash; Adhila; Akbar; Aneesh; Anumol; Aryan; Binny; Lakshmi; Mastani; Nevin; Praveen; Rena; Sabuman	Adhila; Aryan; Binny; Lakshmi; Nevin; Noora; Rena; Sabuman; Shanavas	Abhilash; Adhila; Akbar; Aneesh; Aryan; Binny; Gizele; Jishin; Lakshmi; Sabuman; Shanavas		Adhila; Anumol; Gizele; Lakshmi; Nevin; Noora; Oneal; Sabuman	Akbar; Aneesh; Anumol; Binny; Lakshmi; Nevin; Sabuman; Shanavas	Akbar; Aryan; Lakshmi; Nevin; Noora; Shanavas	Akbar; Aneesh; Anumol; Aryan; Nevin; Noora; Sabuman	Adhila; Akbar; Aneesh; Anumol; Nevin; Sabuman; Shanavas	Adhila; Akbar; Aneesh; Anumol; Nevin; Noora; Shanavas			
Walked	None			Nevin		Renu	None												
Dead Zone	None	Oneal; Sarika	None																
Re-entered	None	Oneal; Sarika	None	Nevin		None													
Evicted	Ranjeet	Bincy	Sariga	No; Eviction		Sarath	Praveen	Rena	Abhilash		Oneal	Binny	Lakshmi	Aryan	Sabuman	Adhila	Akbar	Nevin	Shanavas
Evicted	Ranjeet	Bincy	Sarika	No; Eviction		Shaitya	Mastani	Rena	Jishin		Gizele	Binny	Lakshmi	Aryan	Sabuman	Noora	Aneesh	Anumol	

=== Notes ===
indicates the House Captain.
indicates the Nominees for house captaincy.
indicates that the Housemate was directly nominated for eviction prior to the regular nominations process.
indicates that the Housemate was nominated for eviction due to the regular nominations process.
indicates that the Housemate was granted immunity from nominations.
indicates ticket to finale winner.
indicates the winner.
indicates the first runner up.
indicates the second runner up.
indicates the third runner up.
indicates the fourth runner up.
indicates the contestant as Weak Performer of the week.
indicates the contestant has re-entered the house.
indicates that the Housemate was in Dead Zone.
indicates that the Housemate was in the Secret Room for violating Bigg Boss rules.
indicates a new wildcard contestant.
indicates the Eviction free pass has been used on a housemate.
indicates the contestant has been walked out of the show.
indicates the contestant has been evicted.

- ^Note 1 : Day 3: Akbar was automatically self-nominated for eviction in the second week after failing to complete a partnered segment task of collecting the second golden coin of the weekly task with Aryan.
- ^Note 2 : Day 4: After winning the gold coin in the weekly task, Abhilash gained a special power. Exercising this advantage, he selected Shanavas, who, along with Aryan, had lost the gold coin to him, for direct nomination in the following week's eviction.
- ^Note 3 : Day 8: The process of nominations began with Part 1, where housemates were selected to potentially face a mid-week eviction, first undergoing staying in the Dead Zone, after a series of tasks which happen within the next three days. Following this, Part 2 of the nominations took place, determining which housemates would be subject to public voting for eviction for being nominated by at least two people minimum.
- ^Note 4 : Day 11: Oneal and Sarika KB were taken temporarily out of the Bigg Boss House (for 48 hours) to be in the Dead Zone, which later had been revealed to have been a Secret Room of Punishments, after having the least amount of points.
- ^Note 5 : Day 13: After being revealed in the weekend episode, by the host, that Oneal and Sarika KB have been in the secret room called Dead Zone, they were later brought back into the House.
- ^Note 6 : Day 22: Adhila and Noora split on Day 22 and continued competing as individual contestants from that point onwards.

== Reception ==
The show premiered with record-breaking viewership across both television and digital platforms.

The season accumulated approximately 136 million hours of watch time on JioHotstar (formerly Disney+Hostar), marking it as one of the most-watched editions of the series. Krishnan Kutty, Head of Cluster, Entertainment (South) at JioHotstar, described the achievement as a "stunning feat" and noted it as a reflection of evolving entertainment consumption patterns in Kerala.

On television, the premiere week recorded the highest viewership ratings in the history of the Malayalam version of the show. The launch episode attained a Television Rating Point (TVR) of 15.3, while the regular episodes during the first week averaged a TVR of approximately 11.4 in the HD+SD category.

According to a report published by Endemolshine India, Bigg Boss Malayalam Season 7 topped the regional television rating charts with a TVR of 12.1, making it the highest-rated regional edition of the Bigg Boss franchise during that period. The article notes that the Malayalam version, hosted by Mohanlal, outperformed the Hindi edition hosted by Salman Khan and the Telugu edition hosted by Nagarjuna Akkineni.

The grand finale of Bigg Boss Malayalam Season 7 achieved an unprecedented television rating, registering a TRP of 22.00(SD18.77), the highest ever recorded for any episode in the history of the Malayalam edition of the show. This marked a significant milestone for the series, surpassing all previous finale and special-episode ratings. The exceptional viewership reflected the season's strong audience engagement, wide social media traction, and the popularity of the finalists. With an estimated reach of over 40 million viewers, the finale set a new benchmark for Malayalam reality television.

=== Ratings and viewership ===
Official ratings are taken from BARC India.
(TRP of the episodes telecasting in Asianet only)

Grand Premiere		Grand Finale	
TRP Rating	Viewers(In Million's)	TRP Rating	Viewers(In Million's)
15.3 TRP	33.2	22.00(SD18.77)	40.8

Weekly TRP Rating (U+R, 2+ Category)

* Denotes The TRP Rating in U, 15+ Category

Week 1	10.01 TRP	4 August – 8 August
Week 2	9.57 TRP	9 August – 15 August
Week 3	8.61 TRP	16 August – 22 August
Week 4	9.10 TRP	23 August – 29 August
Week 5	8.53 TRP	30 August – 5 September
Week 6	9.10 TRP	6 September – 12 September
Week 7	9.40 TRP	13 September – 19 September
Week 8	8.77 TRP	20 September – 26 September
Week 9	11 TRP	27 September – 3 October
Week 10	9.27 TRP	4 October – 10 October
Week 11	8.76 TRP	11 October – 17 October
Week 12	10.5 TRP	18 October – 24 October
Week 13	11.8 TRP	25 October – 31 October
Week 14	13.5 TRP	1 November – 8 November
Last Episode	22.00(SD18.77) TRP	9 November 2025
