= Seetha (TV series) =

Indian television series

- Season 2 poster
- Genre: Action
- Written by: G. R. P. Kumar(Season 1); Dhanus(Season 2)
- Directed by: Girish Konni
- Opening theme: "Nizhalinte Nerukil Aardramai"
- Country of origin: India
- Original language: Malayalam
- No. of seasons: 3
- No. of episodes: 903

Production
- Producer: Binu K Ponnoose
- Cinematography: Rajeev Mankomp (Season 1)
- Editor: Ajith Dev (Season 1)
- Camera setup: Multi-camera
- Running time: 20 Minutes (approx)
- Production company: BEE GEE Communications

Original release
- Network: Asianet; Flowers TV
- Release: 29 September 2016 – 12 August 2022

Related
- Chinthavishtayaya Seetha

Seetha is an Indian Malayalam-language action drama television series. The show has three seasons. The first season titled as Chinthavishtayaya Seetha was premiered on 29 August 2016 on Asianet and aired on weekdays at 7:00 PM IST and on-demand through Disney+ Hotstar. Its time slot later changed to 6:30 pm. The first season abruptly ended on 28 January 2017 with 126 episodes. It starred Swasika Vijay, Bipin Jose and Shanavas Shanu in lead roles.

The second season titled as Seetha premiered on 20 February 2017 on Flowers TV. It starred Swasika Vijay, Shanavas Shanu and Bipin Jose in lead roles. It is the first time of Malayalam television industry, a live shoot of an episode was telecast on 5 August 2018 which showed Seetha-Indran marriage from 6:00 pm to 8:00 pm. It was one of the top-rated serials on Malayalam Television and the lead pair Swasika and Shanavas earned a huge fan base due to their on-screen chemistry. The second season went off air on 16 August 2019.

But due to its popularity, the team started the third season of the show named as Seethapennu in Flowers TV from 28 March 2022 and ended on 12 August 2022 with 103 episodes.

== Plot ==
=== Season -1 ===
Seetha is the sole bread earner of her family and is in love with Devan, a farmer, since childhood. Seetha's family wants get them married soon, but Seetha delays it due to her financial hardships.

Seetha returns Gangadaran the money which her father took as a bribe leaving Gangadaran fuming and planning vengeance. Kaveri is seen with Shayju, Gangadharan's son leaving Seetha worried. Yamuna and Sugunan try to woo Kaveri and instigate her against Seetha. She soon falls for Shayju's false love for her and curses Seetha. Simultaneously, Devan's uncle is upset at the marriage's postponement and wants Devan to marry some other girl. At the other hand, Seetha’ mother asks her to marry Devan. Indran returns from Gulf gets attracted to Seetha and wants to marry her. He bribe Narayanan to force Seetha to marry Indran. Indran also meets and plots to use Giri and Sugunan who promises to get Seetha married to him. Seetha refuses to Indran's proposal leaving Kaveri, Yamuna and Narayanan fuming. But, Seetha's mother supports her.

Narayanan loses his cool and forbids Seetha from going to work and house arrests her. Shayju and his friends plot against Kaveri and attack her but she is saved by Devan. Kaveri then realizes the true face of Shayju and supports Seetha and Devan. Seeing Seetha's plight, her mother asks her to elope with Devan. Seetha bids adieu to her sleeping father, and when Devan comes to her house to take her, he is caught by Sugunan and Indran. Narayanan insults Devan who walks away and leaving both him and Seetha in tears. Indran appoints a spy Sobhan to keep an eye on Seetha while she goes to work. Seetha vows not to marry Indran.

Soon, Kaveri and Seetha learn that Kaveri is pregnant and are shattered. Seetha counsels Kaveri and tries to persuade Shayju to unite with Kaveri. On learning this, Devan confronts Shayju for ruining Kaveri's life, while Narayanan promises the villagers to get Seetha married to Indran. Later, Indran and Shayju meet and join hands against Devan and conspire to evict Devan from their lives.

=== Season -2 ===
Seetha is the only earning member of her family. She runs a family of her aged parents, her sister and her brother. Indran being her Moracherukkan (her father's sister's son) dreams of marrying her and is obsessed about his love for her. Sreeraman and Seetha being college mates fall in love and decide to marry with the permission of their parents. Indran befriends loan shark Prathapan and later discovers that he also have enmity with Seetha as she refused to illegally allow him to do his business due to village panchayat rules. After many difficulties and hurdles, they finally marry. Much to their dismay, with the constant interference from Indran and Shankaran Maman, misunderstandings and fights crop in between them. Indran along with Prathapan plots to constantly destroy Seetha's married life. Meanwhile, Indran who realises he can't get Seetha decides to marry Janaki as a bid to show Seetha that he can have a happier married life. Unknowingly, he develops feelings for Janaki, to which she also reciprocates. Meanwhile, a Loan Shark Prathapan now finds his plan of revenge to Seetha failing, plots against Seetha and Indran by cunningly setting them up in a hotel room unknown to them and calls the press and has them arrested. This incident sends shock waves to both Raman and Janaki. Raman and Seetha's relationship further deteriorates. Seetha attempts suicide to which Indran comes as a savior and takes her to hospital. Raman who rushes in the nick in time professes that he loves Seetha deeply, thus saving her from giving in to death. Seeing this, Indran develops respect for Seetha and gives up his revenge plan. Janaki, who fails to believe Indran, breaks her engagement. In a fit of rejection, Indran resorts to alcoholism. Seetha, who feels equally responsible for ruining Indran's life, stops him from drinking by offering a position of being her angel guardian. As Sreeraman discovers that he is diagnosed with a brain tumor that is incurable, he decides to divorce Seetha out of love. He hides this ill fate from Seetha and divorces her. He then takes his childhood friend Janaki to accompany him for his treatment through natural medicine in an ashram.

Meanwhile, Indran, a changed man now, enters Seetha's life by asking her to marry him. She, after being persuaded by her family and Vinayan sir decides to give love and marriage a second chance. Enter, Raman, who still claim to love Seetha but is shattered to know that Seetha has indeed moved on and will never be his. Raman attempts suicide and is saved by his home nurse in the nick of time. Seetha makes it clear to Raman that she would never marry him, making him think of future. Seetha and Indran get married in a big grandeur.

Enter Aadilakshmi who claims to be the illegitimate daughter of Sreedharan. Indran and Seetha's marriage faces turbulence due to Indran keeping Aadilakshmi's truth away. Sreedharan also discovers that he's had a daughter and another wife all the while. But, due to some carelessness of Indran and Saravanan, Seetha learns the truth about Aadilakshmi, but does not ask anything to Indran or her father hoping that they will say everything to her one day. Sreeraman finds love for the second time and marries Devika with the presence of all his relatives and loved ones. During the wedding, Sreeraman's uncle Shankaran, Prathapan and S.I. Sugunan conspires to kill Devika as revenge, but Devika's father is killed in the process as he consumes the unknown poisonous juice that was meant for Devika. Devika and Devika's mother decides to live in Sreeram's home after their marriage. Devika's mother eventually develops memory issues, saddening Devika.

Meanwhile, Sreedharan decides to donate his kidney to the ailing Aadilakshmi's mother as he is guilty of not being responsible all this while. This news is found out by Seetha and catches them red-handed in the hospital and does not allow the surgery to happen. Seetha is heartbroken that her husband and her father hid all this to her and did not open up to her. She acts like she is angry with Indran and refuses to go with him and does not allow him to even touch and does not talk to her father also. Indran pleads to Seetha to forgive her and even touches her legs to ask for forgiveness, but Seetha again acts like she does not want to talk to him and accuses Indran of showing false love. Indran is heartbroken by this and asks Seetha whether he should kill himself to make her believe that loves he her no matter what. Indran goes away and scarves the name Seetha on his chest with a knife. Seetha sees Indran with a knife in his hand and the name Seetha written on his chest. Seetha asks forgiveness to Indran and says that she was acting all the while as being angry. They both reconcile and are back as usual and Seetha even finds another donor for Aadilakshmi's mother. Archana learns of this and she tells Seetha's mother, Naliniamma, of the situation, creating commotion in the family and Naliniamma goes to an Ashram.

Seetha and Indran both plan a trip as they had not gone anywhere after their marriage. On the way, they are attacked by Surendran Pillai's thugs and are left wounded in the way. Raman arrives at the right time and is able to take them to the hospital. Both are admitted in hospital but they are unable to save Indran as he passes away. Seetha comes to her senses and on realizing what happened loses her memory and stops speaking. Everyone in the family is heartbroken and Seetha can't even speak. Meanwhile, Vinayan and Raman try to help Seetha and also take care of the factor. They decide to sell the factory, and people come forward to buy and the selected people are two binamis of Surendran Pillai. They arrive at the last signing of the agreement when suddenly Seetha opposes the deal and even starts to speak and she starts to go to the factory and do everything as usual. Surendran Pillai, Prathapan and Commissioner Vishwanathan along with Sugunan now decide to kill Seetha, and they bring Jatayu Dharman in to play. Jatayu Dharman do everything as per his own plan and even capture Seetha and take her to his custody and just before the murder, he gets to know that Seetha is the person who saved one of his sister from death and asks Seetha for forgiveness and even promises to be a protection for her at all times. Seetha, meanwhile with the help of Raghuvaran, Aadilakshmi and Saravannan, hatches a plan to finish those who killed Indran: the thugs, Peter, Prathapan, Sugunan and Surendran Pillai. She finishes the thugs {thugs} and then sends a death warrant with a date to Peter. Seetha, for business matters, goes to Chennai and is attacked by Prathapan's thugs while at Chennai, but Dharman comes at the right time to save her. She is later approached by a business man, who has also come before while with Indran to ask to spend one night with Seetha. He returns and this time too is saved by Jatayu Dharman. Peter gets Police Protection on the date that he is said to be dead, and Seetha also decides not to attack Peter on that day because police will easily understand everything and Seetha will get caught. On that same night, Peter is attacked, by whom is not known to anyone including Seetha and Saravanan is also caught by the police from the surroundings. When the police ran after Saravannan, someone came and attacked Peter. Saravanan is arrested and brought out of the jail by Vinayan. Seetha starts to have doubts that something is happening in the background without her knowing and doubts Vinayan and Saravannan but gets no clues. Prathapan also gets a similar death warrant as Peter's, but this time not from Seetha or Raghuvaran and now, Surendran Pillai brings out another set of thugs and Seetha again gets surrounded. Dharman again appears and tries to save Seetha but he himself gets a cut on his chest. Seetha is surrounded, when Indran suddenly appears and attacks the thugs and goes after them and wounds all of them and Indran is nowhere to be seen after the attack. Seetha is confused on what is happening. On the next day, AAadilakshmi too see Indran coming out of Dr. Sasi's room but does not get any clues on what happened from Dr. Sasi.. On that night, Indran comes to Seetha's house with the help of Seetha's father and admits that he did not die, but it was all a drama to help the police go after the culprits and even admits that Vinayan, Seetha's father, ACP Mariakutty and Dr.Sasi knew the entire story and also says that he is the one who attacked Peter and says that he will be in the background for a few more days and will come out very soon and they will live together. Indran later scares Shankaran and even attacks Prathapan. Indran comes back out of hiding and is back at their house.

Seetha and Indran also go for a trip to a houseboat of Dharman, and during the Indran realizes that Dharman and Indran are brothers but from different mothers and the same father. Dharma also learns about this after the death of their father and they keep this as a secret without anyone other than Seetha and themselves knowing about it. Indran's factory soon gets a business deal from Electra Constructions Company. During the meeting, Indran is often confronted by Shreya Chacko, who says that her husband Rudran looked very alike to Indran but Rudran died on the night after their marriage due to cardiac arrest. She imagines Indran to be Rudran and often asks him for his presence with her. Seetha in the meanwhile goes ahead with business deals of Shreya Chacko's company without knowing the secret targets of Shreya Chacko. Meanwhile, Seetha gets pregnant and Indran along with Seetha is excited to be parents. Indran is often confronted by Shreya Chacko. Meanwhile, Aadhi Lakshmi's marriage is fixed with Dr. Sasi but her marriage gets called off on the day that was fixed for the marriage because of Dr. Sasi's doubts that Indran and Aadilaksmi have an immoral relationship. Aadilaksmi, sooner rather than later gets close to Raghuvaran and their marriage is soon fixed. Shreya Chacko meets Indran again and this time he tells everything to Seetha when they are at home. Seetha takes the initiative to cancel all the business deals between their factory and Electra Constructions. Meanwhile, Indran tries to get a hold of Giri as he is not picking up phone calls, and gets to know that he is having a close relationship with an Anglo-Indian Julliet. Indran and Seetha somehow get Giri out of this mess and bring him back home.

Time goes by, and Seetha's baby is eight months old. Shreya Chacko comes to Indran again while at office and Seetha who heard everything tells her to get out. Shreya Chacko quickly kisses Indran on the cheeks and Seetha on seeing this slaps Shreya and she leaves. Shreya attempts to kill Seetha the next day by creating a car accident but fails because the car would not turn on at the right time. Shreya Chacko now turns to Sugunan for help in killing Seetha. Sugunan decides to help and they make a plan and Sugunan's thugs capture Seetha from a tea shop while returning from the factory. They take her to Shreya. Saravanan on seeing this runs behind, reaches in time and tries to save Seetha. Indran, who gets the information at the right time also comes. Shreya suddenly points her gun towards Seetha and at the correct time Saravanan comes and the bullet hits Saravanan. Seeing the bullet did not hit Seetha, Shreya goes to Seetha and kicks her on her stomach on her baby. Indran took both of them to hospital and both are admitted to ICU. Indran with the help of Raghuvaran is able to get information that Shreya is going to travel to Dubai the next day. Indran rushes to Shreya Chacko's apartment and is about to kill her, when Shreya says that Indran should not become a murderer and so she suicides with her own gun in front of Indran. Indran rushes back to the hospital but hits his car. However, he reaches the hospital at the right time and the baby is given to his hands. He is excited, but when he asks about Seetha, he does not get a reply and again gets disappointed and confused. After some time, the doctor comes and says that Seetha is normal and has overcome dangerous situations.

Three months later, Aadilakshmi's and Raghuvaran's marriage gets over. The next day, Dr. Sasimohan and Julliet come to Seetha's house as pretend- husband and wife. Seetha and Indran understand the truth and are shown laughing uncontrollably and Adi laskshmi's mom also moves out of Seetha's house to Raghuvaran's new rented house. Seven Years later, the morning mess in the house followed by Indran and Seetha dropping their son Surya at school is shown. Then, we see Bhumika, daughter of SreeRaman and Surya uniting together and walking away hand in hand.

== Cast ==
=== Season - 1 ===
==== Lead ====
- Swasika Vijay as Seetha
- Bipin Jose as a Devan
- Shanavas Shanu as Indran

==== Recurring ====
- Ambika Mohan as Kamala
- T.S. Raju as Narayanan
- Anushree as Kaveri
- Kishore as Sugunan
- Parvathy as Yamuna
- Manju Satheesh as Jayasree
- Joemon Joshy as Shyju
- Bindu Ramakrishnan as Devaki
- Girish Nambiar / Deepan Murali as Dr. Giri Narayanan
- Manve Surendran as Indulekha
- Manoj Nair as C.I. Durgaprasad
- Rahul Mohan as Ganesh
- Dini Daniel as Indira
- Naseer Sankranthi as Shobhan
- Jolly Easow as Indran's mother
- Shanthakumari as Ashok's mother

=== Season - 2 ===
==== Lead ====
- Swasika Vijay as Seetha Indran
- Shanavas Shanu as Indran

==== Recurring ====
- Sruthy Surendran (Manve) as Archana Giridhar
- Ambika Mohan/Roslin as Nalini
- T.S.Raju as Sreedharan
- Naveen Arakkal as Raghuvaran
- Shalu Kurian as Dr.Aadhilekshmi Raghuvaran
- Bipin Jose as Sreeraman
- Hari as Vinayan, Seetha's friend and guide
- Baby Riya as Charumol
- Gauri Krishnan as Devika Sreeraman
- Subhash Nair as Prathapan
- Kishore as SI Sugunan
- Ambili Devi as Janaki Anirudhan
- Apsara Ratnakaran as ACP Mariyakutty IPS
- Adhithyan Jayan as Anirudhan
- Jijo Varghese Antony as CI Madhavan
- Deepan Murali as Giridhar
- KPAC Saji as Surendran Pillai
- Ronson Vincent as Jatayu Dharman
- Sindhu Jacob as Aadhilekshmi's mother
- Jaseela Parveen as Shreya Chacko Thattinpurath
- Varsha as Annamma
- Anzil Rahman as Mohan
- Omana Ouseph as Saradamma
- Saritha.B.Nair as Mrs.Vinayan
- Fazal Razi as Ganesh
- Sabarinath as Dr. Sasimohan
- Kottayam Rashid as Karunan
- Prakash as Commissioner
- Ardra Das

==== Former cast ====
- Harishanth as Vaishakhan/Minister
- Saranya Sasi as Vaidehi
- Amith as Mathukutty
- Manju Pj as Jaya Sree
- Sajitha Betti as Adv. Fathima Beevi
- Baby Vaiga as Ganga Giridhar
- Ann Maria as Meera
- Balachandran Chullikkadu as Guruji
- Prakrithi as Sreedevi
- Pratheeksha G Pradeep as Mythili
- Lishoy as Meera's father
- Sreedevi Anil as Meera's mother
- Harisree Martin as Sudevan
- Molly Kannamaly as Chala Miami
- Thirumala Ramachandran as Kunaran
- Sumi Surendran as Advocate
- Archana Menon
- Gomathi Mahadevan
- Girija Preman
- Maneesh Krishna
- Girija Raveendran
- Anu
- Shanavas Sharaf
- Gracia Nikhila
- Saniya Babu
- Bindu Murali as Sasimohan's mother

==== Guest appearances ====
- Biju Sopanam (Episode 411 – Seetha and Indran kalyanam episode)
- Nisha Sarang (Episode 411 – Seetha and Indran kalyanam episode)
- Rishi S Kumar (Episode 411 – Seetha and Indran kalyanam episode)
- Shivani (Episode 411 – Seetha and Indran kalyanam episode)
- Al Sabith (Episode 411 – Seetha and Indran kalyanam episode)
- Lakshmi Priya (Episode 411 – Seetha and Indran kalyanam episode)
- Nelson (Episode 411 – Seetha and Indran kalyanam episode)
- Aiswarya Rajeev (Episode 411 – Seetha and Indran kalyanam episode)
- Sadhika Venugopal (Episode 411 – Seetha and Indran kalyanam episode)
- Sreekandan Nair (Episode 411 – Seetha and Indran kalyanam episode)
- Stephy Leon as Lily (Episode 580 - 584)
- Sarath Swamy Subramanian (Subru) (episodes 580 - 584)

== Series overview ==
Season	Episodes	Originally released	
Season	Episodes	First released	Last released
1	126	August 29, 2016	January 28, 2017
2	674	February 20, 2017	August 16, 2019
3	103	28 March 2022	August 12, 2022
