= Bipin Jose =

Indian actor (born 1987)

- Born: 13 February 2007 (age 19)
- Occupations: Film actor, tv actor
- Years active: 2013–present

Bipin Jose is an Indian actor who works predominantly in south Indian Movies, Television and Short films.

== Filmography ==
Movies
| Year(s) | Title | Role |
|---|---|---|
| 2016 | Kattappanayile Rithwik Roshan | Amit |
| 2019 | Jathakam | Prasad |
| 2022 | Ellam Settanu | Sanjay |

=== Music Videos ===
Music
| Year(s) | Title | Music |
|---|---|---|
| 2014 | Sneham | Dhibu Ninan Thomas |
| 2020 | Neelambarampol | Unnikrishnan |
| 2023 | Pranah | K. S. Harisankar |
| 2024 | 1991 | Vineeth Sreenivasan |

=== Television ===
Television performances
| Year(s) | Title | Role | Channel |
|---|---|---|---|
| 2013–2014 | Bhagyadevatha | Simon | Mazhavil Manorama |
| 2016–2017 | Chinthavishtayaya Seetha | Devan | Asianet |
| 2017–2019 | Seetha | Sree Raman | Flowers TV |
| 2019–2020 | Chocolate. | Vikram | Surya TV |
| 2021–2023 | Koodevide | Rishikesh Adithyan | Asianet |
