= Maithanam =

- Directed by: M. S. Shakthivel
- Screenplay by: M. S. Shakthivel
- Story by: M. S. Shakthivel
- Produced by: J. T. Sathishkumar
- Starring: M. A. Kennedy; Suresh Guru; Jyothi Raj; Sekhar
- Cinematography: L. K. Vijay
- Edited by: Yogabaskar
- Music by: Sabesh–Murali
- Production company: Aanjhana Cinemas
- Release date: 20 May 2011
- Running time: 125 minute
- Country: India
- Language: Tamil

Maithanam (transl. Stadium/Ground) is a 2011 Indian Tamil-language film written and directed by M. S. Shakthivel, starring four assistant directors, M. A. Kennedy, Suresh Guru, Jyothi Raj and Sekhar. The film released on 20 May 2011. Upon release, Maithaanam received rave reviews, and was screened at the 2011 Dubai International Film Festival with the tagline Life is a Game.

== Plot ==
The lives of four friends change when one of them loses his sister. As they set out to unravel the mystery of the missing girl, they are driven into a web of betrayal.

== Cast ==
- M. A. Kennedy as Suri
- Suresh Guru as Sukumar
- Jyothi Raj as Logu
- Sekhar as Siva
- Swasika as Shanthi
- Agathiyan as Velu
- Rama as Sukumar and Shanthi's mother

== Production ==
Producers S David and T Sathish Kumar agreed to finance the film after their previous commercial film did not fare well. Four assistant directors were chosen to be the lead actors. M. A. Kennedy, Suresh Guru, Jyothi Raj, and Sekhar, who worked as assistant directors to K. S. Ravikumar, Agathiyan, Bharathiraja and Rama Narayanan, respectively. They were given acting training for the film. Swasika, who previously acted in two Tamil films, was chosen to be the heroine. The other heroines are newcomers.

== Reception ==
A critic from Sify wrote, "On the whole, director Sakthivel deserves a pat on his back, for taking the road less travelled. Don’t miss an outing to Maithanam".
