= Comedy Cooks =

Indian Malayalam-language comedy cooking reality programme

- Genre: Reality; Cookery; Comedy
- Based on: Cooku with Comali
- Presented by: Twinkle Sheethal
- Judges: Bhavana; Nalan Shine; Suresh Pillai
- Country of origin: India
- Original language: Malayalam
- No. of seasons: 1
- No. of episodes: 32

Production
- Production locations: Kerala, India
- Camera setup: Multi-camera
- Running time: 60-75 minutes (approx.)

Original release
- Network: Asianet; JioHotstar
- Release: April 18 – August 2, 2026

Comedy Cooks is an Indian Malayalam-language comedy-based cooking competition show. It premiered on 18 April 2026 on Asianet and streaming on JioHotstar. The show is an official adaptation of Tamil TV show Cooku with Comali. The series marks debut of actress Bhavana to the television medium as the show's primary judge. The show ended on 2 August 2026 with Hungry Mahi emerging as winner and Sabumon Abdusamad as runner-up.

== Concept and format ==
The show follows a format where celebrity participants, designated as "Cooks," are paired with comedians, referred to as "Pookies." The contestants must prepare various dishes within a set time limit while managing physical and situational obstacles introduced by the comedians. The dishes are then evaluated by a panel of judges.

== Cast ==
=== Judges ===
Permanent Jury

- Bhavana
- Nalan Shine

Recurring Jury

- Suresh Pillai
- Chef Damu ( Grand Finale )

=== Host ===
- Twinkle Sheethal

Pantry Incharge

- Gizele Thakral

=== Contestants ===
Cooks

Name	Status
Hungry Mahi	Winner
Sabumon Abdusamad	Runner-up
Anumol	Finalist
Geo Joseph	Finalist
Ansiba Hassan	Eliminated
Suchithra Nair	Eliminated
Sandhya	Eliminated
Shabareesh Varma	Eliminated

Pookies

- Nevin Cappressious
- Aevin
- Kevin
- Dain Davis
- Meenakshi Raveendran
- Sreevidya Mullacherry
- Subin Tarzan
- Ashwin Vijayan

== Pairing ==
Cooks	Pookies															
Cooks	Week 1	Week 2	Week 3	Week 4	Week 5	Week 6	Week 7	Week 8	Week 9	Week 10	Week 11	Week 12	Week 13	Week 14	Week 15	Week 16
Mahi	Kevin	Dain	Dain	Aevin	Meenakshi	Aevin	Sreevidya	Dain	Aevin	Meenakshi	Subin	Dain	Subin	Ashwin	Ashwin	Ashwin & Kevin
Sabumon	Sreevidya	Meenakshi	Ashwin	Sreevidya	Kevin	Ashwin	Nevin	Subin	Dain	Kevin	Kevin	Kevin	Meenakshi	Aevin	Meenakshi	Subin & Aevin
Anumol	Ashwin	Ashwin	Aevin	Subin	Ashwin	Meenakshi	Subin	Aevin	Nevin	Ashwin	Dain	Ashwin	Aevin	Meenakshi	Subin	Nevin & Adhitya
Geo	Subin	Nevin	Sreevidya	Nevin	Nevin	Nevin	Dain	Sreevidya	Subin	Dain	Aevin	Aevin	Ashwin	Dain	Kevin	Dain & Meenakshi
Ansiba	Dain	Kevin	Subin	Ashwin	Dain	Kevin	Kevin	Kevin	Kevin	Subin	Meenakshi	Subin	Kevin	Subin	Dain	Eliminated (Week 15)
Suchithra	Aevin	Subin	Meenakshi	Meenakshi	Subin	Dain	Meenakshi	Meenakshi	Meenakshi	Aevin	Ashwin	Meenakshi	Dain	Eliminated (Week 13)		
Sandhya	Meenakshi	Sreevidya	Nevin	Dain	Aevin	Subin	Aevin	Nevin	Ashwin	Nevin	Eliminated (Week 10)					
Shabareesh	Nevin	Aevin	Kevin	Aevin	Eliminated (Week 4)											

Cook(s) of the Week
Advantage Task Winner(s)
Elimination Round
Eliminated
Runner-up
Winner

== Production ==
The show is an official adaptation of Tamil TV show Cooku with Comali. It was previously remade in Malayalam as Cook with Comedy in 2023, but that version was ended abruptly early due to poor reception.

== Release and distribution ==
The show was announced during JioHotstar South Unbound event in December 2025. The show premiered on 18 April 2026 on the Asianet channel. It was simultaneously made available for digital streaming on JioHotstar.
