= Aval (TV series) =

Indian Tamil-language soap opera

- Genre: Soap opera
- Based on: Kumkumapoovu by G. Jayakumar
- Written by: Pa.Athirai Senmozhi (dialogues)
- Screenplay by: Pradeep
- Directed by: G.Jayakumar; U. Vallimuthu
- Starring: Sanjeev; Mahalakshmi; Lakshmy Ramakrishnan; Sreekala; Nithya Ram
- Theme music composer: Jithan Roshan; Saravanan
- Opening theme: Kumkovapoove
- Country of origin: India
- Original language: Tamil
- No. of episodes: 416

Production
- Cinematography: I. Martin Joe
- Editors: Nagaraj; Gowtham
- Camera setup: Multi-camera
- Running time: 22 minutes

Original release
- Network: Star Vijay
- Release: 7 November 2011 – 15 March 2013

Related
- Kumkumapoovu

Aval (transl. She) is an Indian Tamil-language family drama soap opera that aired on Star Vijay from 7 November 2011 to 15 March 2013 for 416 episodes. The concept development and direction is by G. Jayakumar, with U. Vallimuthu being the episode director. It is a remake of the Malayalam serial Kumkumapoovu that aired on Asianet.

== Plot ==
Jayanthi arranges for her daughter Amala to be married to Mahesh. All's well with them until Amala finds out about Shalini, who lives in Mahesh's house. Jayanthi must come to terms with her feelings about the daughter she believed dead.

== Cast ==
- Sanjeev Venkat as Mahesh
- Sreekala Sasidharan/Nithya Ram as Shalini
- Lakshmy Ramakrishnan as Jayanthi (Shalini and Amala Mother)
- Mahalakshmi as Amala
- Harish Siva as Sheela Husband.
- Manikandan as Meyyappan
- Balaji
- Sridhar as Arun (Jayanthi's son)
- Kanya Bharathi

== Adaptations ==
| Language | Title | Original release | Network(s) | Last aired | Notes |
|---|---|---|---|---|---|
| Malayalam | Kumkumapoovu കുങ്കുമപ്പൂവ് | 31 January 2011 | Asianet | 1 February 2014 | Original |
| Tamil | Aval அவள் | 7 November 2011 | Star Vijay | 16 March 2013 | Remake |
| Marathi | Lek Majhi Ladki लेक माझी लाडकी | 2 May 2016 | Star Pravah | 22 October 2018 | Remake |
| Telugu | Kumkuma Puvvu కుంకుమ పువ్వు | 18 July 2016 | Star Maa | 26 April 2024 | Remake |
