= 24 News =

Indian Malayalam-language television news channel

24 News (Twenty Four News)
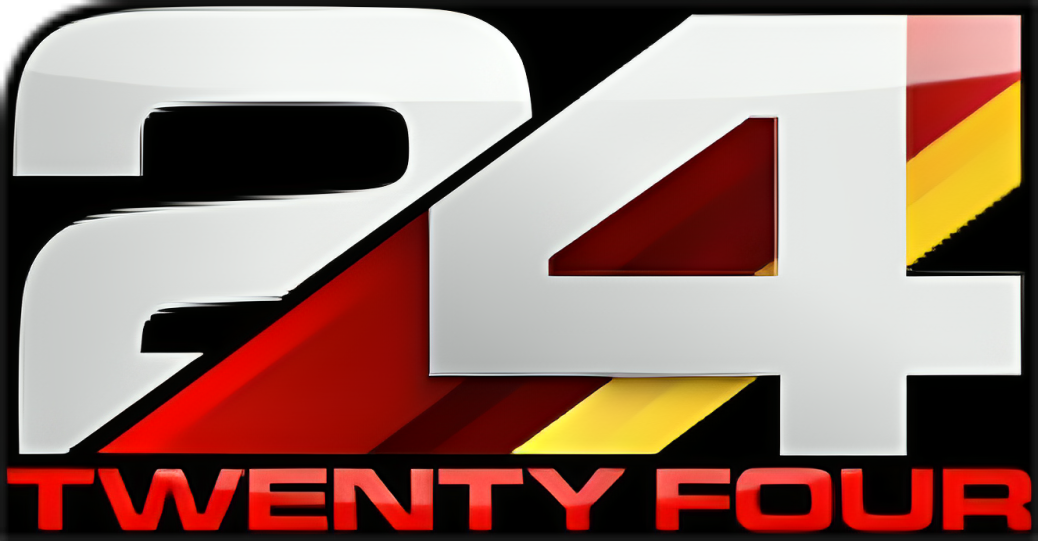
- Logo used since 2018
- Country: India
- Broadcast area: International
- Headquarters: Kochi, Kerala, India

Programming
- Language: Malayalam
- Picture format: 576i SDTV

Ownership
- Owner: Insight Media City
- Key people: Gokulam Gopalan (Chairman, Flowers TV); Alungal Muhammed (Chairman, 24 News); Sreekandan Nair (Managing Director)
- Sister channels: Flowers TV

History
- Launched: 8 December 2018; 7 years ago

Links
- Website: Twenty Four News

Availability

Streaming media
- YouTube: World wide
- Jio TV: India

24 News (Twenty Four News) is an Indian free-to-air Malayalam language news channel owned by Insight Media City. It was initially launched as a pilot in 2016 and officially began operations on December 8, 2018. The channel is headquartered in Kochi and has studios in Thiruvananthapuram and Kochi. It is the second channel from Insight Media City, after Flowers TV.

== History ==
24 News was launched in 2018, initially as a test channel, and was officially launched on 8 December 2018. The channel is promoted by Sreekandan Nair, a prominent Malayalam television anchor. Alungal Muhammed is the chairman of Twentyfour News.

== Ownership ==
24 News is owned by Insight Media City, a media company based in Kochi, Kerala. Insight Media City also owns the popular Malayalam entertainment channel Flowers TV.

== Programming ==
Twenty Four News broadcasts a variety of news and current affairs programs. It also has programs on sports, movies, lifestyle, and other topics. The channel also broadcasts live coverage of important events.

== Awards and recognition ==
Twenty Four News has received several awards for its journalism, including the Kerala State Television Award for Best News Channel in 2020.
