= Katturumbu =

- Katturumbu on Flowers TV
- Genre: Reality
- Presented by: Swasika; Pearle Maaney; Nimmy Arun Gopan
- Country of origin: India
- Original language: Malayalam
- No. of seasons: 2
- No. of episodes: 170+

Production
- Production location: Kerala
- Camera setup: Multi-camera
- Running time: approx. 51 minutes per episode

Original release
- Network: Flowers TV
- Release: 2017 – 2023

Related
- Kaathukuthan Katturumbu

Katturumbu (Malayalam: കട്ടുറുമ്പ്) is a Malayalam children television show, broadcast on Flowers TV. The show features children from four to nine years. The children showcase various dubsmash, skits, dance performances and many other talents. The show was initially hosted by actress and VJ Pearle Maaney.

Later, it was hosted by Swasika show aired its first season from 2017–2018. The show also had a spin-off which was titled as Kathukuthan Katturumbu which was simultaneously aired with season one in the channel. It was a live game show for kids hosted by Swasika. The second season was broadcast in 2023.

== Cast ==
Season 1

- Swasika - Talk Show Host
- Pearle Maaney - Talk Show Host
- Shweta Menon ( judge)

Kathukuthan Katturumbu

- Swasika - Talk Show Host
- Parvathy Krishna- Talk Show Host

Season 2

- Nimmy Arun Gopan - Talk Show Host
- Sheela ( judge)
- Manikuttan ( judge)
- Nithya Das ( judge)
