= Kumkuma Puvvu =

Television series

- Genre: Drama
- Written by: Dialogue: Kranthi Saina
- Screenplay by: Pradeep Panicker
- Story by: M Ananth Kumar
- Directed by: Ashok Rao B
- Starring: Haritha; Princy Krishnan; Akshitha Sathyanarayana
- Theme music composer: Sound engineer: Kondi Shekhar Reddy; Re-Recording: Kumar Raja
- Ending theme: "Kumkuma Puvvu"
- Composer: Saanadh George
- Country of origin: India
- Original language: Telugu
- No. of episodes: 2300

Production
- Producer: N. Sai Kumar
- Cinematography: Damodhar K
- Editor: Vimala Naresh Kongari
- Camera setup: Multi-camera
- Running time: 22 minutes
- Production company: Annapurna Studios

Original release
- Network: Star Maa
- Release: 18 July 2016 – 26 April 2024

Related
- Kumkumapoovu

Kumkuma Puvvu (transl. Saffron flower) is an Indian Telugu soap opera that aired on Star Maa from 18 July 2016 to 26 April 2024. It is a remake of Asianet's Malayalam television series Kumkumapoovu. It starred Haritha, Princy B Krishnan and Akshitha Sathyanarayana in lead roles and is the longest-running Telugu soap opera on Star Maa.

== Plot ==
Jayanthi and her illegitimate daughter Amrutha are separated at Amrutha's birth, with Jayanthi misled into believing her daughter had died while the girl is raised by a butcher, Manikyam, who treats her unkindly. Rescued from the butcher, Amrutha is raised in a better home with a foster brother, Sandeep. When Sandeep marries Jayanthi's second daughter, Siri (who hates Amrutha), Jayanthi realizes who Amrutha is. Amrutha marries Rudra, a local goon. When Rudra is murdered by an enemy, Amrutha becomes a widow and finds her father and mother and she becomes pregnant.

She gives birth to a daughter, Anjali, whom she presumes dead in a fire accident. Amrutha goes insane while Anjali is raised by Kiran and Renuka (Jayanthi's legitimate son and daughter-in-law). After several years, Siri has a daughter Jaanu and she is separated from Sandeep. The family does not know that Anjali is Amrutha's daughter. Anjali does not accept Amrutha but eventually realizes her love for her. Renuka begins to hold a grudge against Amrutha. Amrutha moves on and remarries Arun, who is not ready to accept Anjali. He banishes Amrutha after learning that she is unable to conceive. However, he takes her back after learning that he cannot father children.

Arun pretends to accept Anjali but does not love her, which hurts her. Rudra is revealed to be alive and returns after plastic surgery as Shiva and joins as a driver at Arun's office. Arun suspects that Shiva is Rudra. Amrutha gets pregnant and Arun suspects that the baby is Shiva's baby. Arun accepts Amrutha when Jayanthi gets medical reports that Arun can become father. Jayanthi lies that that Amrutha is dead to prevent Rudra from spoiling Amrutha's new happiness. Arun learns that Shiva is Rudra and pretends to be normal so that he can snatch away Amrutha's property. Anjali and Rudra leave the city and Rudra gets diagnosed with blood cancer and leaves Anjali with a nun named Sister Mary and dies. Anjali returns as Amulya to help Amrutha.

== Cast ==
=== Main ===
- Haritha Thota as Jayanthi – Jayachandra's ex-lover; Raghuram's wife; Amrutha, Siri and Kiran's mother; Jaanu, Anjali, Rahul, Jaya and Vaishnavi's grandmother (2016–2022)
- Princy B Krishnan as Amrutha – Jayanthi and Jayachandra's daughter; Raghuram's step-daughter; Sandeep's foster sister; Siri and Kiran's half-sister; Rudhra's widow; Arun's wife; Anjali, Rahul and Vaishnavi's mother (2016–2024)
- Akshitha Sathyanarayana as
  - Anjali aka Amulya (After) – Amrutha and Rudhra's daughter; Arun's step-daughter; Renuka and Kiran's former foster daughter; Rahul and Vaishnavi's half-sister; Bunty's wife (2022–2024)
    - Vaishu Sundar as Anjali / Amulya (Earlier) (2022)
    - Tanishka as Child Anjali (2020–2022)
  - Lakshmi – Anjali's lookalike; Sagar's wife; Swetha's mother (2023) (Dead)

=== Recurring ===
- Nithin Adwi as Vinay aka Bunty – Kaveri and Chandra's son; Anjali's husband. (2022–2024)
  - Venkat Showrya as Child Vinay aka Bunty (2020–2022)
- Spoorthi Gowda as Asha – Anajli's former friend; Bunty's obsessive lover (2023–2024)
- Prajwal Poorvik as Rahul – Amrutha and Arun's son; Vashnavi's brother; Anjali's half-brother; Jaya's husband (2022–2023)
- Alankritha Shah as Vaishnavi – Amrutha and Arun's daughter; Rahul's sister; Anjali's half-sister; Vicky's wife (2022–2023)
- Vaishnavi Krishna as Jaya – Renuka and Kiran's daughter; Rahul's wife. (2022)
- Ganesh Reddy as Vicky – Vaishnavi's husband (2022–2023)
- Jackie Thota as Raghuram – Jayanthi's husband; Siri and Kiran's father; Amrutha's step-father; Jaanu and Jaya's grandfather; Anjali, Rahul, Vaishnavi's step-grandfather (2016–2022)
- Srinivas as Jayachandra – Jayanthi's ex-lover; Amrutha's father; Anjali, Rahul and Vaishnavi's grandfather (Dead) (2016–2018)
- Kaushik Srikrishna as Arun – Umadevi's son; Kaveri's brother; Amrutha's second husband; Rahul and Vaishnavi's father; Anjali's step-father (2020–2024)
- Madhu Prakash / Sathwik Chowdary as Rudhra – Tripuramba's son; Amrutha's first husband; Anjali's father (Dead) (2016–2019) / (2021–2022)
- Divyavani as Sister Mary – Anjali's caretaker (2022)
- Nirupam Paritala as Sandeep – Amrutha's foster brother; Siri's husband; Jaanu's father. (2016–2020)
- Vishnu Priya / Sandra Jaichandran as Siri – Jayanthi and Raghuram's daughter; Kiran's sister; Amrutha's half-sister; Sandeep's wife; Jaanu's mother (2016–2021)
- Aaradhya Arukula as Jaanu – Sandeep and Siri's daughter (2020–2021)
- Nirmala Reddy as Tripuramba aka Peddarayudamma – Rudhra's mother; Raghuram's aunt; Anjali's grandmother (2019–2022)
- Suresh Chandra as Kiran – Jayanthi and Raghuram's son; Siri's brother; Amrutha's half-brother; Renuka's husband; Jaya's father (2016–2022)
- Anusree Raj as Renuka – Kiran's wife; Jaya's mother (2016–2022)
- Rishika Singh as Kaveri – Umadevi's daughter; Arun's sister; Chandra's wife; Bunty's mother (2020–2024)
- Chandu Dava as Chandra – Kaveri's husband; Bunty's father (2020–2024)
- Padmini Jagadeesh as Umadevi – Arun and Kaveri's mother; Bunty, Rahul and Vaisnavi's grandmother; Anjali's step-grandmother (Dead) (2020–2022)
- Santosh Raj as Sagar – Padmavati's son; Lakshmi's husband; Swetha's father (2023)
- Swarna as Padmavati – Sagar's mother; Swetha's grandmother (2023)
- Ankitha as Sithara – Kiran's girlfriend
- Vikram as Nagaraju
- Chinni Krishna as Sagar
- Lirisha as Aruna
- Padmini/Seetha Mahalakshmi as Swapna
- Bhavana as Prathiba
- Kishore Krishna as Surendra
- Bhel Prasad as Manikyam
- Srihari as Chakri
- Maithili as Amulya
- Pratap Singh Shah as Akash
- Lakshmi as Sangeetha
- Janaki Verma as sujatha
- Balaji as Inspector Sharath
- Nata Kumari as Rajalakshmi
- Kalki Raja as Anand
- Shripriya Sreekar as Manikyam's wife
- Padma Peesapati as Doctor

== Adaptations ==
Language	Title	Original release	Network(s)	Last aired	Notes
Malayalam	Kumkumapoovu കുങ്കുമപ്പൂവ്	31 January 2011	Asianet	1 February 2014	Original
Tamil	Aval அவல்	7 November 2011	Star Vijay	16 March 2013	Remake
Kannada	Amma ಅಮ್ಮಾ	1 February 2016	Star Suvarna	25 February 2017	Remake
Marathi	Lek Majhi Ladki लेक माझी लाडकी	2 May 2016	Star Pravah	22 October 2018	Remake
Telugu	Kumkuma Puvvu కుంకుమ పువ్వు	18 July 2016	Star Maa	26 April 2024	Remake

== Reception ==
Initially aired at a prime time slot, it remained one of the top five most watched Telugu GEC until being shifted to an afternoon slot towards the end of 2018.
