= Swasika =

Indian actress (born 1991)

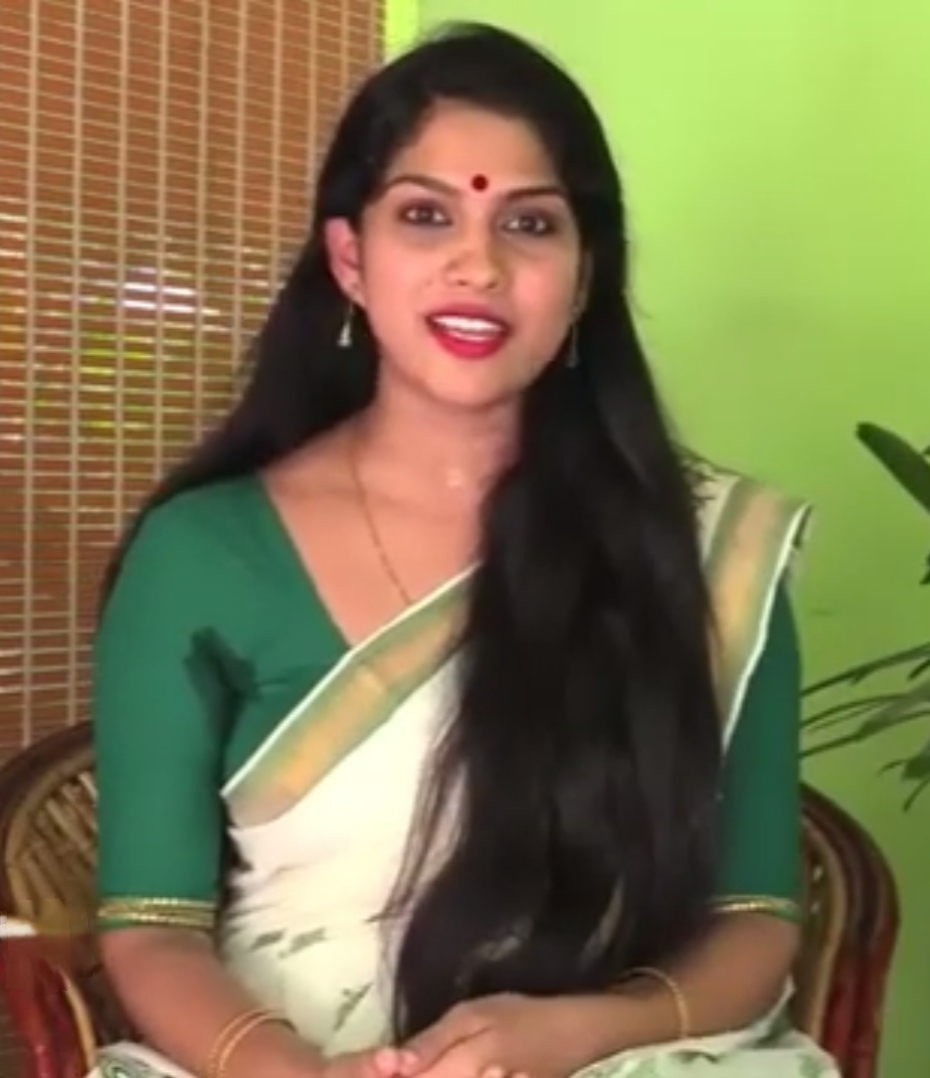
- Born: Pooja Vijay; 5 November 1991 (age 35); Keezhillam, Ernakulam, Kerala, India
- Occupations: Actress; television presenter
- Years active: 2009–present
- Spouse: Prem Jacob (m. 2024)

Pooja Vijay (born 5 November 1991), better known by her stage name Swasika, is an Indian actress and television presenter. She predominantly appears in Malayalam and Tamil films; in addition to few Telugu films.

== Personal life ==
Swasika (Pooja Vijay) was born to Attupurath Vijayakumar (an accountant in Bahrain) and Girija and hails from Perumbavoor, Ernakulam, Kerala. She has a brother, Akash. After taking a Bachelor of Arts degree in literature, she enrolled in dancing lessons. She married actor and model Prem Jacob in January 2024.

== Career ==
=== Film ===
Swasika made her film debut in Sundarapandi's Tamil love story Vaigai (2009), playing a character based on a real person. She was still a student when she played the second lead in Rasu Madhuravan's Goripalayam (2010). Her third film, Maithanam (2011), in which she played a village girl who "values culture and tradition", was well received by critics and audiences. She followed it with the contrasting role of a "city-bred college girl" in Seelan's Kandathum Kanathathum.

She made her Malayalam debut in Cinema Company (2012) and played the lead in Sajeevan Anthikkad's Prabhuvinte Makkal the same year. In the Tamil thriller Panduvam (2014), she played a psychiatrist, a more modern character than those in her earlier Tamil films.

In 2019, she was cast in the title role of the Rahman Brothers' Vasanthi. Her performance won the Kerala State Film Award for Best Character Actress at the 50th Kerala State Film Awards, where Vasanthi also won Best Film and Best Screenplay. The film premiered at the International Film Festival of Kerala in 2021.

=== Television ===
Swasika has also worked as a television presenter, hosting a show on Jeevan TV in 2014. She then took the lead role in the Mazhavil Manorama serial Dhathuputhri (2015), followed by My Marumakan (2015–2016) on Surya TV.

She played the title character in Chinthavishtayaya Seetha (2016–2017) on Asianet and in its sequel, Seetha (2017–2019), on Flowers TV. The role made her popular with Malayalam television audiences and won her several awards. She had also signed on for the serial Pranayini but later left the project.

She hosted the celebrity talk show Red Carpet on Amrita TV from 2020 to 2023, and began hosting the reality show Ammayum Makalum in 2023.

Alongside her screen work, she performs as a dancer in stage shows and has appeared in advertisements, dance music videos, music albums, short films and dance covers.

== Filmography ==
Year	Title	Role	Language	Notes
2009	Vaigai	Uma	Tamil	Credited as Vishaka
2010	Fiddle	Gayathri's friend	Malayalam	
2010	Goripalayam	Parvathy	Tamil	
2011	Maithanam	Shanthi	Tamil	
2011	Kaatu Paranja Katha		Malayalam	
2012	Cinema Company	Reena	Malayalam	
2012	Saattai	Mrs. Dayalan	Tamil	
2012	Ayalum Njanum Thammil	Neethu	Malayalam	
2012	Banking Hours 10 to 4	Aparna Shekhar	Malayalam	
2012	Prabhuvinte Makkal	Devika	Malayalam	
2012	Kandathum Kanathathum	Kavitha	Tamil	
2012	Etu Chusina Nuvve	Renu	Telugu	
2013	Orissa	Dakshayani	Malayalam	
2013	Sokkali	Malar	Tamil	
2014	Parayan Baaki Vechathu	Karimani	Malayalam	
2014	Panduvam	Madhivadhani	Tamil	
2014	Appuchi Gramam	Selvi	Tamil	
2014	At Once	Zareena	Malayalam	
2016	Kaattum Mazhayum		Malayalam	
2016	Swarna Kaduva	Riya	Malayalam	
2016	Kattappanayile Hrithik Roshan	Neethu	Malayalam	
2018	Kuttanadan Marpappa	Jinu	Malayalam	
2018	Neeli	Dancer	Malayalam	Special appearance in the song Poomigaroo
2018	Oru Kuttanadan Blog	Sujatha	Malayalam	
2018	Koodasha	Sowmya	Malayalam	
2018	Prabha	Prabha	Tamil	
2019	Swarna Malsyangal	Wife	Malayalam	
2019	Soothrakkaran	CI Laura	Malayalam	
2019	Ishq	Kunjechi	Malayalam	
2019	Subharathri	Sulnama	Malayalam	
2019	Porinju Mariam Jose	Lissy	Malayalam	
2019	Ittimani: Made in China	Betty	Malayalam	
2020	Vasanthi	Vasanthi	Malayalam	
2021	Keshu Ee Veedinte Nadhan	Suma	Malayalam	
2022	Aaraattu	Balan's daughter	Malayalam	
2022	CBI 5	Merlin	Malayalam	
2022	Pathaam Valavu	Suja	Malayalam	
2022	Kudukku 2025	Jwala	Malayalam	
2022	Monster	Diana	Malayalam	
2022	Kumari	Lakshmikutty	Malayalam	
2022	Autorickshawkarante Bharya	Lilly Paul	Malayalam	
2022	Chathuram	Selena	Malayalam	
2024	Vivekanandan Viralanu	Sithara	Malayalam	
2024	DNA	Merlin Charlie	Malayalam	
2024	Nunakkuzhi	Maya	Malayalam	
2024	Lubber Pandhu	Yasodhai	Tamil	
2024	Oru Anweshanathinte Thudakkam	ACP Sreya IPS	Malayalam	
2025	Randam Yamam	Sofiya	Malayalam	
2025	Retro	Sandhya Thilagan	Tamil	
2025	Maaman	Girija Ravi	Tamil	
2025	Thammudu	Gutti	Telugu	
2025	Bhoghee	Kavitha	Tamil	
2025	Shambhala	Vasantha	Telugu	
2026	Ankam Attahasam		Malayalam	
2026	Karuppu	Vasanthi	Tamil	
2026	Nooru Saami	Selvi	Tamil	
2026	Irumudi	Dhanalakshmi	Telugu	
2026	Aakasamlo Oka Tara	Saraswati	Telugu	

=== Television ===
Acting Credits

Year	Title	Role	Network	Language	Notes	Ref.
2015	Dhathuputhri	Kanmani/Meenu	Mazhavil Manorama	Malayalam		
2015 – 2016	My Marumakan	Aishwarya	Surya TV	Malayalam		
2016 – 2017	Chinthavishtayaya Seetha	Seetha	Asianet	Malayalam		
2017 – 2019	Seetha	Seetha	Flowers TV	Malayalam		
2017	Pranayini	Mili	Mazhavil Manorama	Malayalam	Cameo in promo only Replaced by Sruthy Bala	
2017	Ennalayude Baaki	Maya	Surya TV	Malayalam	Telefilm	
2019	Arayannanglude Veedu	Seetha	Flowers TV	Malayalam	Cameo appearance	
2020	Lockdown Please	Various Roles	Flowers TV	Malayalam		
2020	Pulivaal	Sherly/Teacher	Flowers TV	Malayalam		
2020-2022	Manam Pole Mangalyam	Nila Varma	Zee Keralam	Malayalam		
2021	Mrs. Hitler	Nila	Zee Keralam	Malayalam	Cameo appearance	
2021	Amma Makal	Nila	Zee Keralam	Malayalam	Cameo in promo	
2022	Seethapennu	Seetha	Flowers TV	Malayalam		
2024	Malikappuram: Apathbandhavan Ayyappan	Harikanyaka	Asianet	Malayalam		

TV shows

Year	Title	Role	Network	Language	Notes	Ref
2011	Vivel Active Fair Big Break:	Contestant	Surya TV	Malayalam		
2012 – 2014	Ragalayam	Host	Jeevan TV	Malayalam		
2013	On The Spot	Host	Indiavision	Malayalam		
2015	Raree Rareeram Raaro Season 2	Host	Asianet Plus	Malayalam		
2015	Ethihasa Nayikakoppam	Host	Mazhavil Manorama	Malayalam		
2016	Smart Show	Co-Host	Flowers	Malayalam	Replaced Alina Padikkal	
2016	Super Challenge	Participant	Surya TV	Malayalam		
2016 – 2017	Shubharathri	Host	Jeevan TV	Malayalam	Replaced Krishna Praba	
2017	Celebrity League	Host	Flowers	Malayalam	Onam Program	
2017	Ponnona Ruchi	Host	Flowers	Malayalam	Onam Program	
2017	Onam Pachakamela	Host	Flowers	Malayalam	Onam Program	
2017	Golden Couple	Host	Surya TV	Malayalam	Onam Program	
2017 – 2018	Katturumbu	Host	Flowers	Malayalam		
2017 – 2018	Kaathukuttan Katturumbu	Host	Flowers	Malayalam		
2019	Start Music Aaradhyam Padum	Participant	Asianet	Malayalam		
2020 – 2023	Red Carpet	Host	Amrita TV	Malayalam		
2022	My G Flowers Oru Kodi	Participant	Flowers TV	Malayalam		
2022	Mazhavil Music Awards 2022	Host	Mazhavil Manorama	Malayalam		
2023–2024	Ammayum Makalum	Host	Amrita TV	Malayalam		
2023	Mazhavil Entertainment Awards 2023	Host	Mazhavil Manorama	Malayalam		
2024	Cooku with Comali season 5	Guest	Star Vijay	Tamil	Lubber Pandhu movie promotion	
2026-present	Mahanadigai 2	Judge	Zee Tamil	Tamil		

== Awards and nominations ==
Award	Year	Category	Work	Result
Kerala State Film Awards	2019	Best Character Actress	Vasanthi	Won
Kerala Film Critics Association Awards	2019	Best Supporting Actor (Female)	Vasanthi	Won
Adoor Bhasi Television Awards	2017	Best Television Actress	Seetha	Won
Ananda Vikatan Cinema Awards	2024	Best Character Actress	Lubber Pandhu	Won
70th Filmfare Awards South	2024	Filmfare Award for Best Supporting Actress - Tamil	Lubber Pandhu	Won
14th South Indian International Movie Awards	2025	Best Actress in a Supporting Role – Tamil	Maaman	Won
