= Chinthavishtayaya Seetha =

2016 Indian TV soap opera

- Also known as: Seetha
- Genre: Drama; Romance
- Written by: G. R. P. Kumar
- Directed by: Girish Konni
- Starring: Swasika Vijay; Bipin Jose; Shanavas Shanu
- Opening theme: "Aaranyakandam Thedi Seetha Hridayam Thengi"
- Ending theme: "Nizhalinte nerukil aardhramaai"
- Country of origin: India
- Original language: Malayalam
- No. of seasons: 3
- No. of episodes: 126

Production
- Producer: Binu K Punnoose
- Production locations: Paravur, Kerala
- Cinematography: Rajeev Mankompu
- Editor: Ajith Dev
- Camera setup: Multi-camera
- Running time: 20 minutes (approx)
- Production company: BEE GEE Communications

Original release
- Network: Asianet
- Release: 29 August 2016 – 28 January 2017

Related
- Seetha; Seethapennu

Chinthavishtayaya Seetha is an Indian Malayalam-language soap opera. The show premiered on 29 August 2016 on Asianet and aired on weekdays at 7:00 PM IST and on-demand through Disney+ Hotstar. It starred Swasika Vijay, Bipin Jose and Shanavas Shanu in lead roles. It was the first installment of the Seetha series. The show abruptly ended with 126 episodes.

== Series overview ==
Season	Episodes	Originally released	
Season	Episodes	First released	Last released
1	126	August 29, 2016	January 28, 2017
2	674	February 20, 2017	August 16, 2019
3	103	28 March 2022	August 12, 2022

== Synopsis ==
Seetha is the only earning member of her family. She falls in love with Raman, but an unfortunate turn of events forbids them to unite.

== Plot ==
Seetha is the sole bread earner of her family and is in love with Devan, a farmer, since childhood. Seetha's family wants get them married soon, but Seetha delays it due to her financial hardships.

Seetha returns Gangadaran the money which her father took as a bribe leaving Gangadaran fuming and planning vengeance. Kaveri is seen with Shayju, Gangadharan's son leaving Seetha worried. Yamuna and Sugunan try to woo Kaveri and instigate her against Seetha. She soon falls for Shayju's false love for her and curses Seetha. Simultaneously, Devan's uncle is upset at the marriage's postponement and wants Devan to marry some other girl. At the other hand, Seetha’ mother asks her to marry Devan. Indran returns from Gulf gets attracted to Seetha and wants to marry her. He bribe Narayanan to force Seetha to marry Indran. Indran also meets and plots to use Giri and Sugunan who promises to get Seetha married to him. Seetha refuses to Indran's proposal leaving Kaveri, Yamuna and Narayanan fuming. But, Seetha's mother supports her.

Narayanan loses his cool and forbids Seetha from going to work and house arrests her. Shayju and his friends plot against Kaveri and attack her but she is saved by Devan. Kaveri then realizes the true face of Shayju and supports Seetha and Devan. Seeing Seetha's plight, her mother asks her to elope with Devan. Seetha bids adieu to her sleeping father, and when Devan comes to her house to take her, he is caught by Sugunan and Indran. Narayanan insults Devan who walks away and leaving both him and Seetha in tears. Indran appoints a spy Sobhan to keep an eye on Seetha while she goes to work. Seetha vows not to marry Indran.

Soon, Kaveri and Seetha learn that Kaveri is pregnant and are shattered. Seetha counsels Kaveri and tries to persuade Shayju to unite with Kaveri. On learning this, Devan confronts Shayju for ruining Kaveri's life, while Narayanan promises the villagers to get Seetha married to Indran. Later, Indran and Shayju meet and join hands against Devan and conspire to evict Devan from their lives.

== Cast ==
=== Lead ===
- Swasika Vijay as Seetha
- Bipin Jose as a Devan
- Shanavas Shanu as Indran

=== Recurring ===
- Ambika Mohan as Kamala
- T.S. Raju as Narayanan
- Anushree as Kaveri
- Kishore as Sugunan
- Parvathy as Yamuna
- Manju Satheesh as Jayasree
- Joemon Joshy as Shyju
- Bindu Ramakrishnan as Devaki
- Girish Nambiar / Deepan Murali as Dr. Giri Narayanan
- Manve Surendran as Indulekha
- Manoj Nair as C.I. Durgaprasad
- Rahul Mohan as Ganesh
- Dini Daniel as Indira
- Naseer Sankranthi as Shobhan
- Jolly Easow as Indran's mother
- Shanthakumari as Ashok's mother
