= Kandathum Kanathathum =

2012 Indian film by Seelan

- Directed by: Seelan
- Produced by: Sankaranarayanan S. S. Indhu
- Starring: Vikash; Swasika
- Cinematography: Vinci Baski
- Edited by: B. S. Vasu
- Music by: VA Charlie
- Production company: Sankara Pandiyan Films
- Release date: 18 May 2012
- Country: India
- Language: Tamil

Kandathum Kanathathum (transl. Seen and unseen) is a 2012 Indian Tamil-language romantic drama film directed by Seelan and starring Vikash and Swasika.

== Cast ==
- Vikash as Mukil
- Swasika as Kavitha
- Nisha
- R. Sundarrajan
- Bava Lakshmanan
- Soori
- Jayakala Prabhakar
- Diya
- Karate Venkatesh
- Madurai Vinayagam
- Bans

== Soundtrack ==
Music by VA Charlie.

- "Murra Murra" - Chinmayi (written by Vaseekaran)
- "Idhu Yennada Mayam" - Karthik (written by Tamilamudhan)
- "Asku Pusku" - Anitha (written by Tamilamudhan)
- "Kannae Yen Kannae" (written by Nanthalala)
- "Manasukkullae Maatram" - (written by Tamilamudhan)Krithika Surjit
- "Theme"

== Reception ==
A critic from The Times of India wrote that "The only positive thing that can be said about this film is that it is well under two hours, and thank God for that". A critic from The New Indian Express wrote that "the inexperience of the debutant maker and his inability to lend conviction to crucial scenes in the plot comes as a stumbling block".
