= Lek Majhi Ladki =

- Genre: Drama
- Starring: See below
- Country of origin: India
- Original language: Marathi
- No. of episodes: 783

Production
- Camera setup: Multi-camera
- Running time: 22 minutes

Original release
- Network: Star Pravah
- Release: 2 May 2016 – 21 October 2018

Lek Majhi Ladki is an Indian Marathi language drama television series that aired on Star Pravah. It stars Sayali Deodhar, Nakshatra Medhekar and Aishwarya Narkar in lead roles. It premiered from 2 May 2016 and ended on 21 October 2018.

== Plot ==
It focuses on the relationship between a mother and her daughter. Iravati arranges for her daughter Sanika to be married to Saket. All's well with them until Sanika finds out about Meera, who lives in Saket's house. Iravati must come to terms with her feelings when she realizes that Meera is the daughter she had in her teens, whom she believed dead.

== Cast ==
=== Main ===
- Sayali Deodhar as Meera Samant Kirtikar – Iravati and Aditya's daughter; Jaydev's step-daughter; Sushila's foster daughter; Sanika and Siddhant's half-sister; Saket's foster sister; Hrishikesh's ex-wife; Vijay's wife; Vedika's mother
- Aishwarya Narkar as Prof. Iravati "Ira" Subhedar – Karnal and Sudha's daughter; Aditya's ex-lover; Jaydev's wife; Meera, Sanika and Siddhant's mother; Vedika's grandmother
- Nakshatra Medhekar as Sanika "Sanu" Subhedar Choudhary – Iravati and Jaydev's daughter; Siddhant's sister; Meera's half-sister; Saket's wife

=== Recurring ===
- Vikas Patil as Saket Choudhary – Sushila's son; Meera's foster brother; Sanika's husband
- Avinash Narkar as Jaydev Subhedar – Iravati's husband; Sanika and Siddhant's father; Meera's step-father; Vedika's step-grandfather
- Varad Chavan as Adv. Vijay Kirtikar – Siya's brother; Meera's lawyer and husband; Vedika's step-father
- Chetan Vadnere as Siddhant Subhedar – Iravati and Jaydev's son; Sanika's brother; Meera's half-brother
- Pradeep Welankar as Karnal – Sudha's husband; Iravati's father; Meera, Sanika and Siddhant's grandfather
- Rajani Welankar as Sudha – Karnal's wife; Iravati's mother; Meera, Sanika and Siddhant's grandmother
- Uma Sardeshmukh as Sushila Choudhary – Saket's mother; Meera's foster mother
- Sunil Barve as Aditya Samant – Iravati's ex-lover; Meera's father; Vedika's grandfather
- Ashutosh Kulkarni as Hrishikesh "Hrishi" Agnihotri – Vatsala and Vishwas's son; Meera's ex-husband; Vedika's father
- Smita Saravade / Pournima Talwalkar as Vatsala Agnihotri – Vishwas's wife; Hrishikesh's mother; Vedika's grandmother
- Siddhi Karkhanis as Rashmi
- Prasad Pandit as Lokhande
- Poornima Ahire as Chanda
- Shantanu Moghe as Satya
- Harsha Gupte

== Adaptations ==
Language	Title	Original release	Network(s)	Last aired	Notes
Malayalam	Kumkumapoovu കുങ്കുമപ്പൂവ്	31 January 2011	Asianet	1 February 2014	Original
Tamil	Aval அவல்	7 November 2011	Star Vijay	16 March 2013	Remake
Kannada	Amma ಅಮ್ಮಾ	1 February 2016	Star Suvarna	25 February 2017	Remake
Marathi	Lek Majhi Ladki लेक माझी लाडकी	2 May 2016	Star Pravah	22 October 2018	Remake
Telugu	Kumkuma Puvvu కుంకుమ పువ్వు	18 July 2016	Star Maa	26 April 2024	Remake
