= Angane Thanne Nethave Anjettennam Pinnale =

- Promotional poster
- Directed by: Ajith Poojappura
- Written by: Ajith Poojappura
- Produced by: Suresh Nair
- Starring: Narain; Shanavas Shanu; Mukesh; Suraj Venjaramoodu; Azees Nedumangad
- Cinematography: Anil Nair
- Edited by: Sandeep Nandakumar
- Music by: M. Jayachandran
- Production company: Greenland Visiom
- Release date: 20 May 2016
- Country: India
- Language: Malayalam

Angane Thanne Nethave Anjettennam Pinnale is a 2016 Indian Malayalam-language film written and directed by Ajith Poojappura featuring Narain, Shanavas Shanu, Mukesh, Suraj Venjaramoodu and Azees Nedumangad in lead roles.

== Plot ==
The village of Kanakkodu is free of politics and political parties. Pala Thankachen spread the seeds of politics in the calm atmosphere prevalent there. Consequently, the villagers divide themselves into different political groups.

== Cast ==
- Narain as Karthikaperumal
- Sai Kumar as Perumal
- Mukesh as Pala Thankachan
- Ramesh Pisharody as Puthupally Wilson
- Suraj Venjaramoodu as Ganapathy Pilla
- Shanavas Shanu as Arjunan Pilla
- Meera Nandan as Anu
- Thesni Khan as Ganapathy Pilla's wife
- Renji Panicker as Sakhariya Sir
- Suresh Nair as Company MD
- Manoj Guinness as Rahul
- Swapna as B.D.O
- Kishore N. K. as TV Reporter
- Azees Nedumangad as Kakka Madhu
- Janardhanan as Sakuni Raghavan Pilla
- Kochu Preman as Velichappadu
- Mamukoya as Kuruppu
- Munshi Venu as BBC Shaji
- Devan as Collector
- Kottayam Sinaj as Farmer
- Shyju Adimali as Brittas
- Nelson as Thambikkuttan Bhagavathar
- Shyju Joseph as Wilson's friend
- Unnikrishnan as Cameraman
