= Gizele Thakral =

Indian model and actress

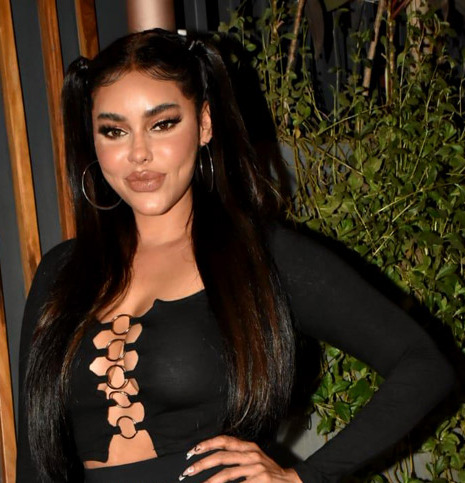
- Thakral in 2022
- Born: September 4, 1992 (age 34); Rajasthan, India
- Other name: Gigi
- Occupations: Actress; Model; Entrepreneur
- Height: 1.7 m (5 ft 7 in)
- Awards: Miss Rajasthan

Gizele Thakral (born 4 September 1992) is an Indian model, actress and entrepreneur known for her participation in the reality television show Bigg Boss season 7 (2025) and her roles in Bollywood films. She made her acting debut in the comedy film Kyaa Kool Hain Hum 3 (2016) as Meri Lee and has also appeared in Mastizaade (2016) as Titli Boobna and The Great Indian Casino (2019). She won the title of Miss Rajasthan in her teenage. She came back to the limelight on television again in Bigg Boss (Malayalam TV series) season 7 (2025) and Comedy Cooks (2026) reality shows in the Malayalam television industry.

== Early life ==
Gizele Thakral was born on 4 September 1996 in Sri Ganganagar, Rajasthan, India to a Malayali mother and a Punjabi father, and grew up in Punjab. She also spent a part of her life in Dubai, UAE.

She began her modeling career at age 14, participating in the Gladrags Model Hunt, where she reached the top five finalists and won titles such as Miss Best Body and Miss Potential. She later won the Miss Rajasthan title as a teenager.

== Career ==
=== Modeling ===
Thakral gained prominence in the modeling industry after being featured in the Kingfisher Calendar in 2011. She also represented India at the Ford Models Supermodel of the World contest in Turkey.

She has been a part of many fashion weeks including Paris Fashion Week, London Fashion Week and Milan Fashion Week.

=== Television ===
In 2012, Thakral competed in the reality show Survivor India but exited early due to an injury. In 2013, she appeared on Welcome – Baazi Mehmaan Nawazi Ki, a cooking-based reality show.

In 2015, she entered Bigg Boss 9, hosted by Salman Khan, as a wild card contestant but was eliminated after a short stint.

In 2016, she appeared as a guest on the comedy show Comedy Nights Bachao.

In 2025, she entered the Malayalam reality show Bigg Boss (Malayalam TV series) season 7.

=== Film ===
Thakral debuted in Bollywood with the 2016 comedy film Kyaa Kool Hain Hum 3, playing the character Meri Lee. In the same year, she appeared as Titli Boobna in Mastizaade. She later acted in The Great Indian Casino (2019).

=== Music video ===
In 2022, Thakral was featured as the female lead in the music video "Escobar" by Jaggi Amargarh and Simar Kaur.

In 2023, she was featured in the music video for the song "Bands" by American rapper Rick Ross, directed by Richard Stan.

=== Business ===
In 2022, Thakral launched a company in Dubai focused on fashion, technology, investment, and warehousing, with a particular emphasis on the fashion sector.

== Filmography ==
Year	Title	Role	Language	Refs
2016	Kyaa Kool Hain Hum 3	Meri Lee	Hindi	
2016	Mastizaade	Titli Boobna	Hindi	
2019	The Great Indian Casino		Hindi	

=== Television shows ===
Year	Title	Role	Language	Notes	Ref
2012	Survivor India – The Ultimate Battle	Contestant	Hindi	Exited due to injury	
2013	Welcome – Baazi Mehmaan Nawazi Ki	Contestant	Hindi		
2015	Bigg Boss Hindi 9	Contestant	Hindi	Wild card entry	
2016	Comedy Nights Bachao	Guest	Hindi		
2025	Bigg Boss Malayalam 7	Contestant	Malayalam		
2026– present	Comedy Cooks	Pantry In-charge	Malayalam		

=== Music videos ===
Year	Title	Singer(s)
2022	"Escobar"	Jaggi Amargarh and Simar Kaur
2023	"Bands"	Rick Ross

== Media image ==
Thakral has frequently been compared to Kim Kardashian in media coverage, with outlets highlighting similarities in their physical appearance and glamorous personas.
