= Joemon Joshy =

Indian actor

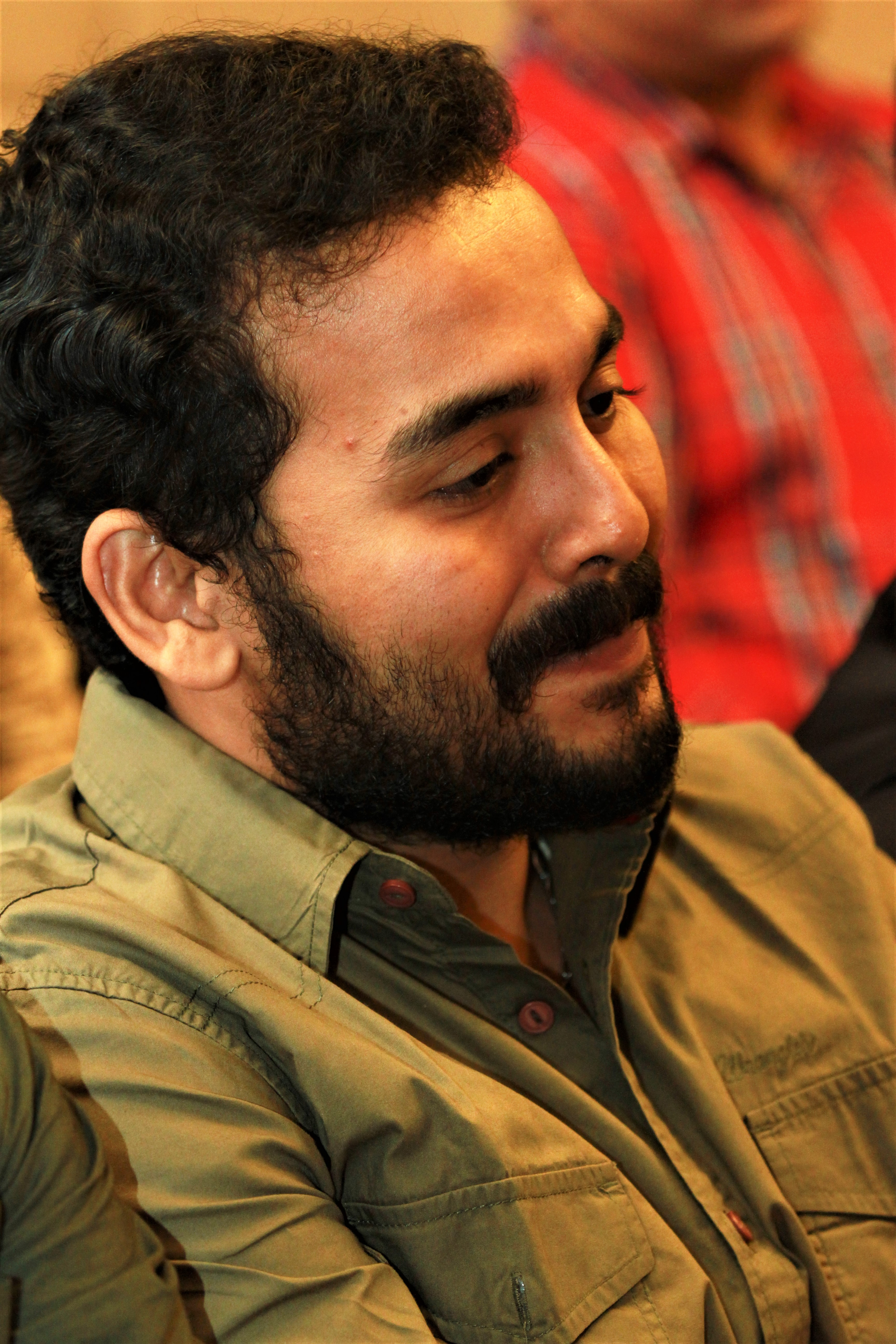
- Joemon in 2019
- Born: 2 September 1988 (age 38); Ernakulam, Kerala, India
- Occupation: Film actor
- Years active: 1999–present
- Website: actorjoemonjoshy.page.tl

Joemon Joshy (born 2 September 1988) is a Malayalam film and television actor. He started his film career as a child artist. Joemon made his acting debut in Puraskaram a 1999 Malayalam language children's film. Joemon has played a variety of roles.

== Early life and career ==
Joemon Joshy finished his schooling from C.M.E Public School at Ochanthuruth and Little Flower High School at Narakkal. Joemon graduated in Journalism from Bharata Mata College, Thrikkakara in Ernakulam.

He began his acting profession as a child artist.

He debuted with the role of Vinu with the movie Puraskaram directed by K.P Venu in 1999.

He acted in Sahayathrikakku Snehapoorvam, Rakshasa Rajavu, Meerayude Dukhavum Muthuvinte Swapnavum and Chronic Bachelor.

In 2010, he worked movies in adult roles such as Pokkiri Raja, Kandahar, Pusthakam, Omega.exe, Thilothamma, Bhaskar The Rascal, Kamuki

Aside from films, he also acted in the serials Kayamkulam Kochunni in 2004 and Velakkani Mathavu in 2007.

He acted as Nandhu in the serial 4 the People broadcast in Asianet.

== Filmography ==
=== As an actor ===
Year	Title	Role	Note	Language
1999	Puraskaram	Venu	Child artist (Debut Movie)	Malayalam
2000	Sahayathrikakku Snehapoorvam	Maniyanpilla Raju's Son	Child artist	Malayalam
2000	Cover Story	Suresh (Nedumudi Venu's Grand Son)	Child artist	Malayalam
2000	Neelathadaakatthile Nizhalppakshikal	Johny	Child artist	Malayalam
2001	Karumadikkuttan	Village Boy	Child artist	Malayalam
2001	Unnathangalil	Young Michael	Child artist	Malayalam
2001	Fort Kochi	Uncredited appearance in the song	Child artist	Malayalam
2001	Rakshasa Rajavu	Thommi Kunju	Child artist	Malayalam
2002	www. anukudumbam. com	Thoma	Child artist	Malayalam
2002	Phantom	Kennadi	Child artist	Malayalam
2002	Kakke Kakke Koodevide	Damban Ponnus	Child artist	Malayalam
2002	Aabharanacharthu	Venu	Child artist	Malayalam
2002	Bhavam	Village Boy	Child artist	Malayalam
2003	Chronic Bachelor	Joemon	Child artist	Malayalam
2003	Meerayude Dukhavum Muthuvinte Swapnavum	Vimal Kumar	Child artist	Malayalam
2003	Snehadoothu	Unni	Child artist	Malayalam
2003	Bheri	Village Boy	Child artist	Malayalam
2004	Govindankutty Thirakkilanu	Prem	Child artist	Malayalam
2004	Nerkku Nere		Child artist	Malayalam
2005	Krithyam		Child artist	Malayalam
2006	Jayam	Vishnu	Child artist	Malayalam
2007	Speed Track		Child artist	Malayalam
2007	Changathipoocha	Mahesh	Child artist	Malayalam
2010	Pokkiri Raja	Gopi		Malayalam
2010	Kandahar	Major Kishore		Malayalam
2010	Pusthakam	Anoop		Malayalam
2013	Omega.exe	Vishal		Malayalam
2014	Medulla Oblangata	Imri (Heroine's Brother)		Malayalam
2015	Bhaskar the Rascal	Arun		Malayalam
2015	Thilothamma	Saleem		Malayalam
2015	Nizhal	Anonymous	(Debut Tamil Movie)	Tamil
2015	Thaayillamal Naan Illai	Santhanam		Tamil
2015	Sadhurangam	Mani		Tamil
2018	Onnam Varavu	Monichan		Malayalam
2018	Kamuki	J.J		Malayalam
2018	Neeyum Naanum Anbe	Jagan		Tamil
2019	Fortkochile Njanga Mattacherile Ninga	Suku	(Post-Production)	Malayalam
2019	Maffi Dona	Sameer		Malayalam
2019	Vakathirivu	Arun		Malayalam
2019	Michaelinte Santhathikal	Vivek		Malayalam
2020	Varky	Michael		Malayalam
2020	Iruttu	Dasan	(Post-Production)	Malayalam
2021	Swapnangalkk Appuram	Abdhu		Malayalam
2021	Thel	Alex		Malayalam
2021	Kalyaana Vayasu	Pandiyan		Tamil
2022	Apposthalanmarude Pravarthikal	Tojo	(Post-Production)	Malayalam
2022	Vasudha	Aravindan		Malayalam
2022	Kalpanika	Nandhu		Malayalam
2023	Chola Whiskey	Bibin	(Post-Production)	Malayalam
2023	Sada Nannu	Vikas Varma	(Debut Telugu Movie)	Telugu
2024	Prema Pooja	Vinay		Malayalam
2024	Adhiyude Adhyathey Christmas	Nandhan		Malayalam
2024	Muttayi	Asokan		Malayalam
2025	JSK: Janaki V v/s State of Kerala	Ad. Bineesh		Malayalam
2025	Change	Joby	(Post-Production)	Malayalam
2025	PC 35	PC Prasanth	(Post-Production)	Malayalam
2026	Juniors Journey	Karthi		Malayalam
2026	Veri	Sharan		Malayalam
2026	Bellari Raja	TBA	Filming	Malayalam
2026	B Nilavarayum SharjahPalliyum	Manikuttan	Filming	Malayalam
2026	99 Street	Abi	Filming	Malayalam
2026	Family Circus	Prince	Filming	Malayalam
2026	Amanushikam	Viplavam Vinu	Filming	Malayalam

=== As a dubbing artist ===
Year	Film	Character	Dubbed for
2018	WWW.Anukudumbam.Com	Anand	Anil Kapoor
2015	Poovalliyum Kunjadum	Avinash	Villain Character

== Television Serials ==
- All TV series are in Malayalam language

Year	Program	Role	Channel	Notes
2004	Mangalyam	Janko Varghese	Asianet	
2004	Kayamkulam Kochunni	Ramankutty	Surya TV	
2007	Velankkani Mathavu	Chako Antony	Surya TV	
2010	Butterflies	Sudeep	Surya TV	
2010	Chakravakam		Surya TV	
2010	Gajarajan Guruvayur Keshavan	Appu	Surya TV	
2015–2016	4 the People	Nandhu	Asianet	
2016–2017	Chinthavishtayaya Seetha	Shyju	Asianet	
2020	Chackoyum Maryyum	Alen	Mazhavil Manorama	
2021	Ammayariyathe	Ramakanthan	Asianet	
2024-2025	Etho Janma Kalpanayil	Nandha Kishore	Asianet	

== Short Movies ==
Year	Program	Role	Director	Notes
2014	Kozhikoden Halwa	Rahul	Jamnas Muhammed	
2015	The Pulsate		Aneesh Babu	
2018	Nithya Haritha Kamukan		Jamnas Muhammed	
2021	Line Of Murder		Dinu Sathyan	
