= Sreekandan Nair =

Indian media personality, television anchor and journalist

R. Sreekandan Nair
- Born: Kollam, India
- Occupations: Managing director; Television personality; Television Host; Producer
- Years active: 1983–present

Sreekandan Nair aka SKN is a media personality, television anchor, veteran journalist and Managing Director of Flowers TV and 24 News.

He has hosted several Malayalam TV shows, including Oru Nimisham, Nammal Thammil, and Samadooram. He was formerly a presenter on Doordarshan, the content head and senior Vice President of Asianet in the Kerala sector of India, and a consultant to the entertainment television operations of Mazhavil Manorama. He has hosted a talk show called the 'Sreekandan Nair Show' on Flowers TV in which he achieved Guinness World Records along with Flowers TV for hosting a TV talk-show for 6 hours and asked 674 questions on 18 March 2018 .

== Career ==
In 1984, Sreekandan Nair started his career as a programme executive at All India Radio. There, he penned and staged over 1500 satirical radio plays, radio dramas, and documentaries. He also anchored the program Oru Nimisham on Doordarshan. He wrote a screenplay for Malayalam movie Raajathanthram.

He later joined Asianet as the head of its TV content division in Kerala. While working there, he launched the Malayalam television talk show Nammal Thammil, which spanned 750 episodes over 17 years. He eventually became the Show Director of the event management division of Asianet. In 2003, he became the senior vice president of Asianet. He simultaneously worked for Mazhavil Manorama as a consultant and founded the company Magic Media Infotainment Private Limited. Under its banner, he produced and anchored the talk show Samadooram and the television serial Kathayile Rajakumari, which was broadcast on Mazhavil Manorama.

On 4 January 2016, he launched a talk show called the Sreekandan Nair Show on Flowers TV, of which he is the managing director. He later launched another talk show called 'Oru Nimisham' on the same channel.

Sreekandan Nair launched a show called Flowers Oru Kodi, which allows participants to win 1 crore through a quiz session. The show is live since 2022.

year	Program	Channel	Role	Notes
1990's	Oru Nimisham	DD Malayalam	Host	
1995-2011	Nammal Thammil	Asianet	Host	Replaced by John Brittas
2011-2012	Kathayile Rajakumari	Mazhavil Manorama	Producer	Serial
2012	Samadooram	Mazhavil Manorama	Host	
2013-2014	Sreekandan Nair Show	Surya TV	Host	
2015-2016	Smart Show	Flowers TV	Host	
2016 – 2019	Sreekandan Nair Show	Flowers TV	Host	
2016-2017	Oru Nimisham	Flowers TV	Host	
2016	Anavaranam	Flowers TV	Host	
2019	Anantharam	Flowers TV	Host	Replaced by Govind Padmasoorya
2019 – present	Good Morning	Twentyfour News	Co-Host	
2020–present	Encounter	Twentyfour News	Host	
2020	Covid Commerce	Twentyfour News	Host	
2020	Break the chain	Twentyfour News	Mentor	Awareness program
2020	Koodathayi	Flowers TV	Story, Script, dialogue	Serial
2020-2021	Nandanam	Flowers TV	Producer	Serial
2021 – present	Flowers Oru Kodi	Flowers TV	Host	
2022	Oru Kodi Kilukkam	Flowers TV	Co-Host	12 hour live event
2022	Chirikkarude Samsthanasammelanam	Flowers TV	Co-Host	

== Films ==
• Kalimannu Tv Anchor

• Arjunan Sakshi Tv Anchor

- Raajathanthram (1997) (Story, Screenplay, dialogue)
- Njangal Santhushtaranu as Sreekandan Nair
