= Kumkumapoovu =

Indian soap opera television series

- Genre: Family Drama; Action
- Created by: G.Jayakumar
- Developed by: G. Jayakumar
- Written by: Pradeep Panicker
- Directed by: Dileep Kumar S.; Praveen Kadakkavoor
- Creative directors: Aju S. Shivan; Santhosh Krishna
- Starring: Asha Sharath; Sajan Surya; Shelly Kishore; Shanavas Shanu; Aswathy
- Theme music composer: Ronnie Raphael
- Opening theme: "ഒരു താരാട്ടിനിണo പോലെ"; "Orutharattineenam Pole"
- Ending theme: "രാക്കിളി പാട്ടിന് കൂടൊഴിഞ്ഞു"; "Rakkilipaattin Koodozhinju"
- Composer: Saanand George Grace
- Country of origin: India
- Original language: Malayalam
- No. of episodes: 785

Production
- Producers: G. Jayakumar; S. Vinod
- Editors: Rohith Roshan; Sujith N. S.; Sujeesh
- Camera setup: Multi-camera
- Running time: 22 minutes
- Production companies: Bhavachithra; Ross Petals Entertainment Pvt Ltd

Original release
- Network: Asianet
- Release: 31 January 2011 – 1 February 2014

Related
- Remakes: Aval(Tamil); Amma (Kannada); Kumkuma Puvvu (Telugu); Lek Majhi Ladki (Marathi)

Kumkumapoovu (transl. Saffron Crocus) was an Indian Malayalam-language soap opera that aired on Asianet from 2011 to 2014. It ran for 785 episodes. The cast included Asha Sharath, Sajan Surya, Shelly Kishore, Shanavas Shanu, Aswathy, G.K Pillai and Rindhya.

The serial won several awards at the Asianet Television Awards including Best Serial 2012, Best Script for 2012,2013 and 2014, Best Actor for Sajan Surya in 2012 and 2013, Best Actress for Asha Sarath and Shelly in 2012 and 2013 respectively.

A spiritual sequel of the series titled Karuthamuthu was aired on Asianet from 2014 to 2019. The series is set in a story of another families with Illekettu Namboothiri reprises his role of Satyasheelan.

== Plot ==
Jayanthi and her illegitimate daughter Shalini were separated at Shalini's birth, with Jayanthi misled into believing her daughter had died while the girl was raised for a time by a butcher, Markose, who treated her unkindly. Shalini was rescued from the unkind butcher and raised in a home with a foster brother, Mahesh. When Mahesh marries the legitimate daughter of Jayanthi, Amala, Jayanthi realizes who Shalini is. Jayanthi must come to terms with her feelings about the daughter she believed dead.

== Cast ==
- Asha Sarath as Professor Jayanthi Prabhakaran – Jagannatha and Vasantha's daughter; Jithan's ex-lover; Prabhakaran's wife; Shalini, Amala and Arun's mother; Karthika's grandmother
- Shelly Kishore as Shalini Rudhran – Jayanthi and Jithan's daughter; Prabhakaran's step-daughter; Subhadramma's foster daughter; Amala and Arun's half-sister; Mahesh's foster sister; Rudhran's wife
- Sajan Surya as Mahesh – Subhadramma's son; Shalini's foster brother; Amala's husband; Karthika's father
- Shanavas Shanu as Rudhran – Shalini's husband
- Aswathy Thomas as Amala Mahesh – Jayanthi and Prabhakaran's daughter; Arun's sister; Shalini's half-sister; Mahesh's wife; Karthika's mother
- GK Pillai as Colonel Jagannatha Varma – Vasantha's husband; Jayanthi's father; Shalini, Amala and Arun's grandfather
- Lishoy as Prabhakaran aka Prabha – Jayanthi's husband; Amala and Arun's father; Shalini's step-father; Karthika's grandfather
- Kalaranjini as Subhadramma aka Athimuttathamma – Mahesh's mother; Shalini's foster mother; Karthika's grandmother
- Sona Jelina as Karthika Mahesh – Amala and Mahesh's daughter
- Amith as Jithan – A Writer; Jayanthi's ex-lover; Shalini's father
- Jayakrishnan Kichu / Pratheesh Nandan as Arun Prabhakaran – Jayanthi and Prabhakaran's son; Amala's brother; Shalini's half-brother; Karuna's and Chithra husband
- Anjana Haridas-as Chithra Arun;Arun's second wife
- Dharmambigai Rindhya as Karuna Arun – Arun's exwife
- Indira Thampi as Vasantha Varma – Jagannatha's wife; Jayanthi's mother; Shalini, Amala and Arun's grandmother
- T.S Raju as Markose – Mariamma's husband; Shalini's former caretaker
- Vijayakumari as Mariamma Markose – Markose's wife; Shalini's former caretaker
- Santhosh Kurup as CI Jayapalan
- Devendranath as Aadhi/Adithyan (Antagonist)
- Yadhu Krishnan as Adarsh (Antagonist)
- Amboori Jayan as Govindan
- Anjana Haridas as Chithra
- Illekettu namboothiri as Sathyasheelan
- Haridas Varkala as Keeri
- Rajeev Roshan as Anand
- Vimal Raj as Kazhukan Shaji
- Chitra Iyer as Arundathi Jithans friend
- Vanitha Krishnachandran as Professor Rajalakshmi
- Bijoy Varghese
- Sreeya Remesh as Meera
- Yamuna Mahesh as Advocate
- Sreekala V K as Police Constable
- Kallayam Krishadas
- Karthika Kannan as Kanchana
- Alina Padikkal as Thara

== Awards ==
5th Asianet Television awards 2012

- Best Serial – G Jayakumar Bhavachithra (Ross petal entertainment . Pvt.Ltd)
- Best Director – Praveen Kadakkavoor
- Best Screenplay – Pradeep Panicker
- Best Actor – Sajan Surya as Mahesh
- Best Actress – Asha Sarath as Pro. Jayanthi
- Best Debut – Shelly as Shalini
- Most Popular Actor – Shanavas as Rudhran
- Best Dubbing Artist – Bhagyalakshmi for Prof. Jayanthi
- Best Actor in a negative role (Female) – Ashwathy as Amala
- Best Character Actor – T.S. Saju as Markose
- Best Cinematographer – Hemachandran
- Best Music Director – Rony Rapheal for Oru Thaaratin eenam Pole
- Best lyrics – Prayaar Geethamohan
- Best editor – Rohit Roshan
- Special Jury – Haimambika Rindhya as Karuna
- Lifetime Achievement Awards – GK Pilla

6th Asianet Television Awards 2013

- Evergreen Hit serial – Kumkumapoovu
- Best Actor – Sajan Surya as Mahesh
- Best Actress – Shelly as Shalini
- Best Screenplay – Pradeep Panicker
- Golden star of the year – Asha Sarath as Pro. Jayanthi
- Best Actor in a negative role (female) – Ashwathy as Amala
- Best Actor in a negative role (female) Spl. Jury – Haimambika Rindhya as Karuna
- Best Actor in a negative role (male) – Devendranath
- Background score – Sanand George
- Best Dubbing Artist Male – Shobi Thilakan for Jithan
- Best Dubbing Artist Female – Devi S. for Amala
- Best editor – Rohit Roshan

7th Asianet Television Awards 2014

- Best Screenplay – Pradeep Panicker
- Best editor – Rohit Roshan

Asiavision Television awards 2013

- 2013 – Best Actress (Asha)
- 2013 – Best serial
- 2013 – Best Negative Actress (Aswathy)

Asiavision Television Awards 2014

- 2014 – Best Actress (Shelly)
- 2014 – Golden star (Asha)
- 2014 – Popular Actor (Shanavas)

== Adaptations ==
Language	Title	Original release	Network(s)	Last aired	Notes
Malayalam	Kumkumapoovu കുങ്കുമപ്പൂവ്	31 January 2011	Asianet	1 February 2014	Original
Tamil	Aval அவல்	7 November 2011	Star Vijay	16 March 2013	Remake
Kannada	Amma ಅಮ್ಮಾ	1 February 2016	Star Suvarna	4 February 2017	Remake
Marathi	Lek Majhi Ladki लेक माझी लाडकी	2 May 2016	Star Pravah	22 October 2018	Remake
Telugu	Kumkuma Puvvu కుంకుమ పువ్వు	18 July 2016	Star Maa	26 April 2024	Remake
