= Flowers TV =

Indian-Malayalam language TV channel

- Logo used since 2015
- Type: Television channel
- Country: India
- Broadcast area: Indian sub-continent, Middle East, North America
- Headquarters: Kochi, Kerala

Programming
- Language: Malayalam
- Picture format: 576i SDTV

Ownership
- Owner: Insight Media City
- Key people: Gokulam Gopalan (Chairman); Sreekandan Nair (Managing Director)
- Sister channels: 24 News

History
- Launched: 12 April 2015; 11 years ago

Links
- Website: Flowers TV

Availability

Streaming media
- YouTube (Paid only): (India)
- YuppTV: (Worldwide)
- Jio TV: (India)

Flowers TV is an Indian Malayalam-language, general-entertainment, pay television channel owned by Insight Media City. The channel was launched on 12 April 2015. Flowers TV HD feed is only available through their YouTube channel.

== History ==
The channel was originally promoted by Sreekandan Nair who is also the managing director of Flowers TV. Gokulam Gopalan is the chairman and Dr. Vidhya Vinod is the Vice Chairperson of Flowers TV.

Flowers TV broadcasts from Kochi, Kerala, India. As per the statistical analysis of BARC data for the first eight weeks of 2017, Flowers TV is ranked in the top-five lists.

Flowers TV is available in the United States through YuppTV and also other Asian regions. Flowers once broadcast I-League matches with Malayalam Commentary. On 12 April 2017, Flowers TV, Rays3D, Mulakuppadam Films and Mohanlal set a Guinness World Record for the largest attendance at a 3D film screening, 12,526 spectators watched the screening of the Malayalam film Pulimurugan (2016) at Adlux International Convention Centre in Angamaly, Kerala.

== Channel ==
Channel	Category
24 News	News

== Current broadcast ==
=== Drama series ===
Premiere date	Name	Notes
24 June 2024	Uppum Mulakum 3	
8 May 2023	Sukhamo Devi	
3 February 2025	Mahalekshmi	
5 October 2026	Sithara	

=== Reality shows ===
Airing	Name	Notes
2026–present	Top Singer 7	
2024–present	Ithu Item Vere	
2026–present	Dance Dhamaka	

== Former broadcast ==
=== Original series ===
==== Drama series ====
Year	Name
2015–2017	Eeran Nilavu
2015	Ishwaran Sakshiyayi
2015–2017	Moonnumani
2015	Vishwaroopam
2015	Shesham
2016	Shesham 2
2016–2017	Manjal Prasadam
2016	Pokkuveyil
2016–2018	Rathri Mazha
2017–2019	Seetha
2017	Sakudumbam Shyamala
2017–2018	Mamangam
2017	Maamattikutty
2017	Parisudhan
2018–2019	Arundhathi
2019–2020	Kathayariyathe
2019	Arayannangalude Veedu
2019	Classmates
2019	Malarvadi
2020	Koodathayi
2020–2021	Anna Kareena
2020–2022	Nandanam
2021	Moodalmanju
2021	Ente Bharya
2021–2022	Priyankari
2022	Seethapennu
2023	Kunkumacheppu
2023–2024	Amme Bhagavathi / Attukal Amma
2024–2025	Panchagni
2025	Veettile Vilakku

==== Comedy series ====
Year	Name
2015–2024	Uppum Mulakum Season 1,2
2020–2024	Chakkappazham Season 1,2
2022–2025	Surabhiyum Suhasiniyum Season 1,2
2026	Yes Your Honour

==== Sports ====
Year	Name
2023	Celebrity Cricket League
2023	I-League

==== Reality/Non-scripted programming ====
- Aryakku Parinayam (2018) (Dubbed)
- Katturumbu (2016–2018)
- Katturumbu 2 (2023)
- Malayali Veettamma (2017)
- Top Singer 1-6 (2018-2026)
- Voice of Kerala (2024-2025)
- Comedy Utsavam season 1-3 (2018-2024)
- Oru Kodi season 1,2 (2021-2024)
- Oru Kodi with Comedy (2024)
- Smart Show (2015-2016)
- Smart Show 60 (2016)
- Smart Show (2025)
- Star Magic (2016-2024)
- Musical Wife 1,2 (2023–2026)
