= Sanskrit cinema =

Sanskrit cinema is the segment of Indian cinema dedicated to the production of motion pictures in Sanskrit language, with only 30 films made since 1983 and no separate industry for Sanskrit films.

== History ==
The first Sanskrit film ever made was Adi Shankaracharya in 1983 by G.V. Iyer. At the 31st National Film Awards, it won four awards, including Best Film, Best Screenplay, Best Cinematography and Best Audiography.

The second film was Bhagavad Gita in 1992, again by G.V. Iyer. The film won the National Film Award for Best Feature Film at the 40th National awards for 1992. The next Sanskrit film was made in 2015, after a gap of 22 years.

From 2015 to 2017, 4 Sanskrit films were made in Kerala, India. Priyamanasam was the 3rd Sanskrit film and the first Sanskrit film from Kerala. The film won the award for 'Best Feature film in Sanskrit' at the 63rd National awards. The film was screened at the 46th International Film Festival of India (IFFI) in Goa in 2015. Ishti, made in 2016, was the first Sanskrit film based on a social issue. The film was screened at the 47th International Film Festival of India (IFFI) in Goa in 2016, in the panorama section.

Suryakantha was the fifth Sanskrit film and the third one made in Kerala. It is the first Sanskrit film on contemporary life. The film won 'Special Jury award' in Kerala Film Critics Associations awards, 2017.

Anurakthi is the first Sanskrit 3D film with a song in the film picturised in 3D format. That also made Anurakthi the first Sanskrit film to have a song in it. The film was screened at the 48th International Film Festival of India (IFFI) in Goa in 2017.

Pratikriti is the first commercial film in Sanskrit. This is written and directed by Dr. Nidheesh Gopi.

Punyakoti (20019) became the first animated film in Sanskrit.

Madhurasmitham world's first children's film in Sanskrit. Directed by sureshgayathri 2019. Madhurasmitham won the Travancore International Award for Best Film.

Namo screened at IFFI in 2021 and its story resolve around friendship between Sudama and Sri Krishna.

== List of Sanskrit films ==
Year	Title	Director	Notes
1983	Adi Shankaracharya	G.V. Iyer	First Sanskrit feature film. Won 4 national awards, including Best Feature film.
1993	Bhagavad Gita	G.V. Iyer	Won national awards for Best Feature film.
2015	Priyamanasam	Vinod Mankara	Won national award for Best Feature film in Sanskrit. Screened at the 46th edition of International Film Festival of India (IFFI).
2016	Ishti	G. Prabha	Opening film of the feature section of the Indian Panorama section at the 47th edition of IFFI.
2017	Suryakantha	M. Surendran	Won 'Special Jury award' at Kerala Film Critics Associations awards, 2017
2017	Anurakthi	P. K. Ashokan	First 3D Sanskrit film. First Sanskrit film with a song. Screened at the 48th International Film Festival of India (IFFI)
2019	Madhurasmitham	Suresh Gayathri	World's First Children's Sanskrit Film
2020	Punyakoti	Ravi Shankar V	First Sanskrit animation film.
2020	Agochararnavah	Poornima R Iyer	
2021	Pratikriti	Dr.Nidheesh Gopi	First Commercial Sanskrit film, premiered on Firstshows OTT platform.
2021	Namo	Vijeesh Mani	Screened at 51st International Film Festival of India Indian panorama section
2021	Samasyah	Shibu Kumaranallur	Environmental film, released on Neestream OTT.
2021	Shaakuntalam	Dushyant Shridhar	A film based on story of Shakuntala and King Bharat.
2022	Madhubhashitham	Suresh Gayathri	Movie shot in 48 hours.
2022	Bhagavadajjukam	Yadu Vijayakrishnan	Adaptation of the 7th century play of the same name. Selected for Indian Panorama at 52nd International Film Festival of India.
2022	Ekachakram	K. Suchendra Prasad	Based on the works of N. Ranganatha Sharma, produced by Voicing Silence, an international platform for meaningful cinema.
2022	Taya	G. Prabha	Screened at various International Film festivals and national film festivals film festivals including Pune, Kolkata, Bangalore, Delhi.
2023	Dharmayodha	Sruthi Simon	First Sanskrit film by a woman director.
2024	Ekaki	Prasad Parappuram, Fr John Puthuva, Ayyampuzha Harikumar	First Sanskrit film with only one character.
2024	Sloka	Janardhana Maharshi	Sanskrit film with original story & music.
