= Smarthavicharam =

Ritualistic trial for adultery

Smārthavichāram (meaning 'inquiry into the conduct') was the trial of a Nambudiri woman and fellow male adulterers who were accused of illegitimate sexual relations.

== The trial ==
There are six stages to a Smarthavicharam

=== Dasi Vicharam (Trial of the maid-servant) ===
The first stage of this trial procedure is interrogating the 'dāsi', the maid, of the accused female member. If a Nambudiri housewife (antharjanam) was suspected of sexual misconduct then she was at first placed under restraint, and as a first step, her dāsi or. vṛṣali, was questioned. If the dāsi should incriminate her mistress the latter is forthwith segregated and a watch set upon her.

=== Anchampurayilackal ===
If there is substantial evidence (sangayum thurumbum) on the antharjanam's sexual misdeeds, she is isolated to a special cell. After the woman is isolated, the family-head informs the king about the case. The king then sends four lawyers together with a smārthan (judge) and a Brahmin for conducting the trial.

=== Questioning the Antharjanam ===
The third stage involves questioning the antharjanam by the smārthan. During questioning the smārthan sits outside the cell without seeing the accused. This can take up hours or even days depending on the severity of the case and until the woman accepts all allegations and becomes a sāthanam (an inanimate object).

During this period the antharjanam may subject to physical torture if necessary to make her confess. A popular method was to pack the woman in a mat, like a dead body, and roll it from the housetop. At other times, rats, snakes and other poisonous creatures were driven into the cell of the accused.

Once she has accepted all her misdeeds, the smārthan questions the sāthanam face to face to get the names of the jārans (the men involved). She also has to substantiate her accusations by proofs, normally some marks on the private parts of the men, which the smārthan later verifies. The trial would continue until the smārthan is convinced that there are no more jārans.

=== Swarūpamchollal ===
After this, the king would be informed about the men involved. If the accused deny these allegations, they were subject to sathya-parīkṣa (test of truth) at Sucīndram temple.

=== Dehavichedam ===
In this stage, the saathanam and the guilty men are ceremoniously ostracized and excommunicated.

=== Shuddhabhojanam (pure meal) ===
The trial team shares a meal after this. If the accused are found to be innocent, they also take part in it.

If the accused women was found guilty, she and the men found involved with her (known as jāran) were excommunicated from the caste (Bhraṣṭû) and banished. The trial was mainly conducted by the smārthans from three Bhattathiri families. They are Pattachomayarath Mana, Vellaykat Mana and Moothamana. Moothamana Bhattathiris did the smarthavicharams in Travancore, Vellaykat Mana Bhattathiris did the smarthavicharams in Malabar and Pattachomayarath Mana Bhattathiris had the right to conduct smarthavicharams in the whole of Kerala. The permission of the Mahārāja (king) was necessary to start a smārthavichāram. The practice is nonexistent today and last reportedly took place in 1918.

== Trial of Kuriyedath Thāthri (Savithri in Sanskrit) ==
The most sensational Smarthavicharam was the one in 1905 that involved Kuriyedath Thāthri, the wife of Chemmanthatta Kuriyedathu Rāman Nambūdiri of Mukundapuram Taluk. Thathri had been married off at an early age to the sixty-year-old Rāman Namboodiri. The trial lasted for six months. The trial was conducted by the bhattathiris from pattachomayarath mana. The verdict was pronounced on the night of 13 July 1905, indicting Thāthri and the other accused men. Some sources say that there were 65 accused men (jāran) and she was asked to name them and substantiate her claim by narrating their body marks. The accused were men of high caste, influential and reputed in the society. Thātri's accused paramours included 30 Nambūthiris, 10 Iyers, 13 Ambalavāsis and 11 Nairs. From the accounts of the people who recount the tale, the Raja of Cochin stopped the trial since his name was next on her list. The documents related to the trial have been compiled by Cherai Ramadas in a book titled Thaathreesmarthavicharam: Sampoornna Reghakalum Padanangalum (Thaathreesmarthavicharam, Complete Documents and Studies).

== Popular culture ==
The Malayalam feature film Parinayam and the Malayalam short film Thārattu Pattu are based on this custom.

The Sanskrit film Taya by G. Prabha depicts this famous trial and the events that lead to it.
