= Anoop Krishnan =

Indian actor, director and anchor

Anoop Krishnan Anughil
- Born: 7 September 1990 (age 36); Pattambi, Palakkad, India
- Occupations: Actor; Director; Anchor
- Years active: 2010–present
- Spouse: Dr. Aishwarya Nair (m. 2022)

Anoop Krishnan (born 7 September 1990) is an Indian actor, director and anchor, who works predominantly in Malayalam film industry.

He contested in the third season of the Malayalam reality TV series Bigg Boss.

== Early and personal life ==
Anoop was born to Unnikrishnan K and K. M Shobhana Devi in Pattambi, Palakkad, Kerala. He has two siblings, Akhilesh Krishnan and Akhila Krishnan. He had his primary education from AUP School, Muthuthala and high school at PHS Pallippuram. He did his vocational higher secondary from VHSE Koppam. He is a graduate in B.A Literature from SNGS & Co-Operative College, Pattambi.

On 23 January 2022, Anoop married his long-time girlfriend Dr. Aishwarya Nair at Guruvayur Temple.

== Career ==
In 2010, Anoop Krishnan was selected for the movie Face in Facebook directed by Jibin George James. Unfortunately, this project was not completed due to technical reasons and Anoop shifted his career into anchoring live stage shows. He started doing anchoring for various stage shows and continued to perform for more than 80 stages both in India and abroad with Malabar Maholtsavam, DTPC Onam fest and National Games closing ceremony among few of them. It was during this period that he got callback into two back-to-back movies alongside Mammootty – Daivathinte Swantham Cleetus directed by G. Marthandan (2013) and Praise the Lord directed by Shibu Gangadharan (2014). Unfortunately, those two characters didn't get much of an attention.

In 2014, Anoop's mentor and music director Sunny Viswanath introduced him to Padma Shri Balachandra Menon for doing a stage show in Dubai and that got him an opportunity to assist Balachandra Menon on his comeback movie Njan Samvidhanam Cheyyum which was released in 2015. While doing that movie, he got selected for doing a lead role in a Sanskrit movie called Ishti directed by G. Prabha. Anoop learned Kathakali Padam and trained himself in making kadhakali ornaments and handicrafts. He also has reduced 11 kg to play the character in the movie. He got attention from national and international film fraternity. Ishti made him to walk through red carpet of Indian Panorama of IFFI held at Goa held in 2016.

By 2015, he started making short music videos, documentaries and short films. Some of works were selected for Malayalam TV channels. One of his documentary – 'Raise of hope' was done for kidney related diseases and its awareness, with the help and support of Dr. Jayant Thomas Mathew (Nephrologist in Amala Institute of Medical Sciences) and Sunny Viswanath. During this time, Anoop did minor roles in cinemas like Sarvopari Palakkaran(2017) directed by Venugopan, Ennaalum Sarath..? (2018) directed by Balachandra Menon and Contessa directed by Sudip E.S (2018). He was a male lead character in known commercial movie called Ammamarathanalil (2017) directed by Jibin George James. He gained 8 kg to play a middle-aged character in the movie Ammamarathanalil.

In 2018, director Sunil Kariattukara selected him for a television serial called Seetha Kalyanam telecasted in Asianet and Hotstar. He turned a household name with his lead character 'Kalyan' in this television show and his on-screen chemistry with actress Dhanya Mary Varghese is widely appreciated as well.

He, alongside actress Dhanya Mary Varghese, received the Asianet Television Awards for the best pair . He was also nominated for the best actor and popular actor category in the same year.

At the end of 2019, Anoop Krishan's suspense thriller short film 'De-javu' was successfully released on Christmas Day and received broad attention. In June 2024, Anoop's short film Kanmashi was released in YouTube and received widespread critical acclaim. He received the Kerala State Television Award for Best Actor and Best Director for the same.

Besides acting, Anoop is a cricket player as well. He is a member of the Celebrity team Kerala Strikers and participated in the Celebrity Cricket League

== Filmography ==
=== Films ===
Year	Title	Role	Notes
2013	Daivathinte Swantham Cleetus	Shopkeeper	Debut
2014	Praise the Lord	Samkutty's friend	
2015	Njan Samvidhanam Cheyyum	Shyam	
2015	Ishti	Raman Namboothiri	Sanskrit movie
2017	Sarvopari Palakkaran	Heroine's friend	
2018	Ennaalum Sarath..?	Sub Inspector Ravi	
2018	Contessa	Rajan	
2019	De-javu		Short film
2021	Amma Marathanalil	Prakashan	Lead character
2022	Ajagajantharam	Devarajan	
2022	Nagham		Short film
2022	Geetha	Keezhsherry Devanarayanan thampuran	Web series
2022	Koode	Naresh Iyer	Music album
2023	Chandranum Policum	Sub Inspector Arun	
2023	Bhagavan Dasante Ramarajyam	Sub Inspector Murali	
2024	Kanmashi	Paramu, the Theyyam Artist	Won the best actor and best director award at 2024 Kerala State Television Awards
2024	Panchayath Jetty	Sub Inspector	
2024	Oru Kattil Oru Muri	Negative Role	
2024	Pani	Joshi	
2025	Baby Girl	Police constable	
2025	Aryavrutham †	TBA	
2026	Neekkam	Bus conductor	
2026	Lollipop Sports Academy	Shailendran	Tamil debut

=== Web Series ===
Year	Title	Role	Notes
2019	Geetha	Keezhsherry Devanarayanan thampuran	Released on YouTube
2025	Kammattam	Dr. Siju	Released on Zee5
2025	Rajavinte Makan		Released on Kuku FM
2026	Malabar Cup	Salman	Released on Zee5

=== Television ===
Year	Serial	Role	Channel	Notes	Ref.
2018–2021	Seetha Kalyanam	Kalyan	Asianet	Lead character	
2019	Start Music Season 1	Contestant	Asianet		
2020	Avarodoppam Aliyum Achayanum	Kalyan	Asianet	Telefilm	
2020-2021	Start Music Season 2	Contestant	Asianet		
2021	Bigg Boss Malayalam 3	Contestant	Asianet	4th Runner up	
2021	Onamamankam	Contestant	Asianet		
2021	Start Music Season 3	Co-Host	Asianet		
2022	Happy Valentine's Day	Co-Host	Asianet		
2022	Start Music Season 4	Co-Host	Asianet		
2023	Start Music Season 5	Co-Host	Asianet		
2025	Annie's Kitchen	Guest	Amrita TV		

== Awards & Recognitions ==
=== Asianet Television Awards ===
- 2019 – Best Pair (with Dhanya Mary Varghese) for Seetha Kalyanam
- 2022- Best Anchor for Star music

=== Kerala State Television Awards ===
- 2024:Kerala State Television Award for Best Actor (Kanmashi)
- 2024: Kerala State Television Award for Best Director (Kanmashi)
- 2024: Kerala State Television Award for Best Film (Kanmashi)

=== Recognitions ===
- 2016 – Indian Panorama recognition for Inaugural Ishti
- 2021- Participated as a contestant in Bigg Boss Malayalam Season 3.
