= Taya (2022 film) =

2022 Indian Sanskrit-language film

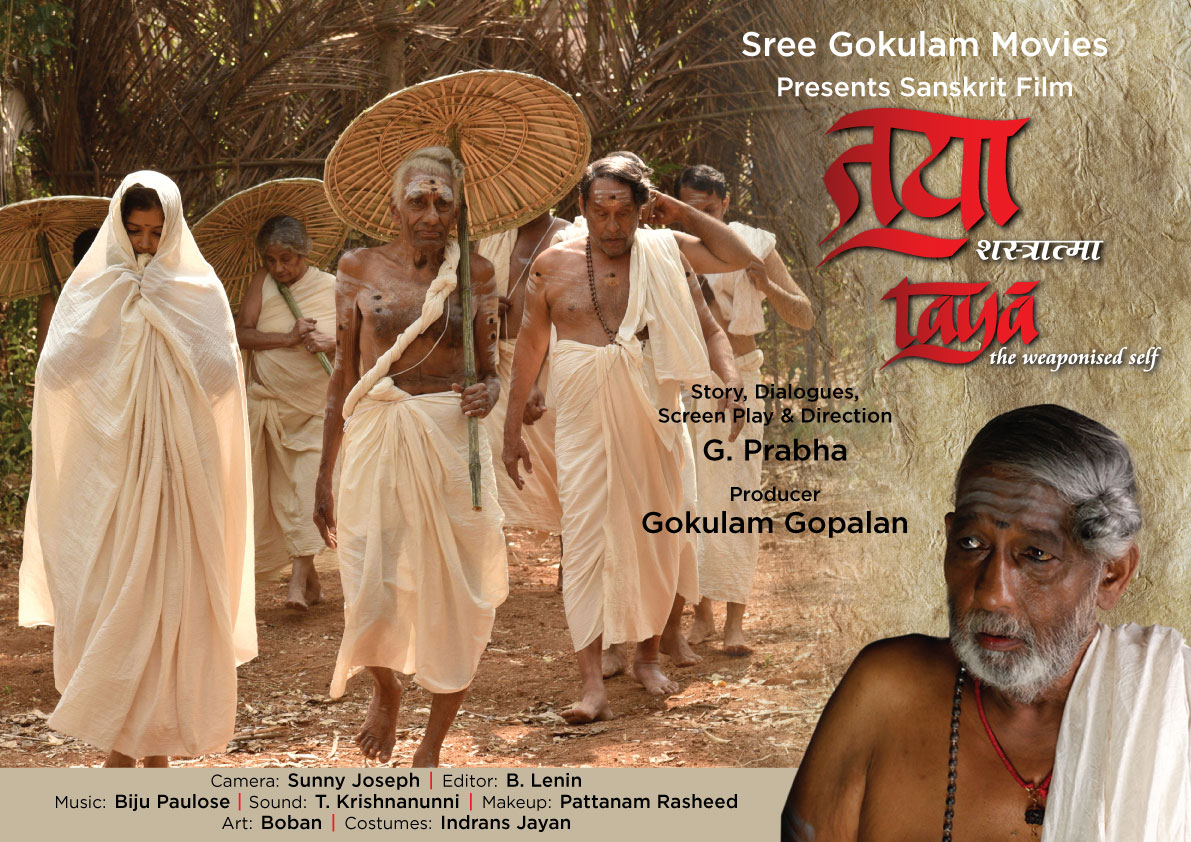
- Directed by: Dr. G. Prabha
- Written by: Dr. G. Prabha
- Produced by: Gokulam Gopalan
- Starring: Nedumudi Venu; Anumol; Babu Namboodiri
- Cinematography: Sunny Joseph ISC
- Edited by: B Lenin
- Music by: Biju Paulose
- Release date: 2022
- Running time: 112 minutes
- Country: India
- Language: Sanskrit

Taya (English: By Her) is a 2022 Indian Sanskrit-language period drama film written and directed by G. Prabha. Produced by Gokulam Gopalan under the banner of Sree Gokulam Movies, the film stars Anumol, Nedumudi Venu, and Babu Namboodiri.

The film is based on the historic "Smarthavicharam" (ritual trial for adultery) of Kuriyedathu Tatri in 1905, a landmark event in the social history of Kerala that challenged the patriarchal norms of the Namboothiri Brahmin community

== Plot ==
The film is set in the early 20th century within the orthodox Namboothiri community of Kerala. It centers on Savithri (based on the historical figure Kuriyedathu Tatri), a woman who is subjected to the rigid and often oppressive patriarchal customs of her time. In this era, only the eldest son of a Namboothiri family was permitted to marry within the community, leading to a surplus of unmarried women and the practice of polygamy by older men.

After being victimized by the sexual anarchy and hypocrisy prevalent in the community, Savithri is subjected to a Smarthavicharam—a trial for adultery conducted by an all-male panel of elders. While such trials were designed to shame and expel women, Savithri uses the proceedings to expose the men involved. During the 40-day trial, she identifies 64 men who had exploited her, including high-ranking members of her own social circle. The film culminates in her ultimate act of defiance against the King and the patriarchal structure, securing her own freedom through expulsion while dismantling the moral facade of the community leaders

== Cast ==
- Anumol as Savithri (Tatri)
- Nedumudi Venu as Eswaran Namboodiri
- Babu Namboodiri as Maheswaran Namboodiri
- Nelliyodu Vasudevan Namboothiri as a 78-year-old Namboodiri
- Rangasri Revathi Subramanian as Arya
- Pallippuram Sunil as Viswaraman

== Production ==
Taya is the second Sanskrit feature film directed by Dr. G. Prabha, following his debut film Ishti (2016). The film was shot with an emphasis on historical authenticity, featuring cinematography by Sunny Joseph and editing by the veteran B. Lenin. The music was composed by Biju Paulose, with sound design by T. Krishnanunni

== Release and reception ==
The film was showcased at several prestigious national and international film festivals throughout 2022 and 2023. It received critical acclaim for its handling of a sensitive historical subject and its contribution to Sanskrit cinema.

== Film Festivals ==
The film participated in numerous festivals, including:

- Kolkata International Film Festival (KIFF)
- Pune International Film Festival
- Bengaluru International Film Festival
- Habitat International Film Festival, New Delhi
- International Film Festival The Hague, Netherlands
- Palm Beach International Film Festival, US

== Awards ==
- Diorama International Film Festival: Best Actress (Anumol Manoharan)
