= Manorama Thampuratti =

Sanskrit scholar

Manorama Thampuratti was an 18th-century Sanskrit scholar.

== Early life and education ==
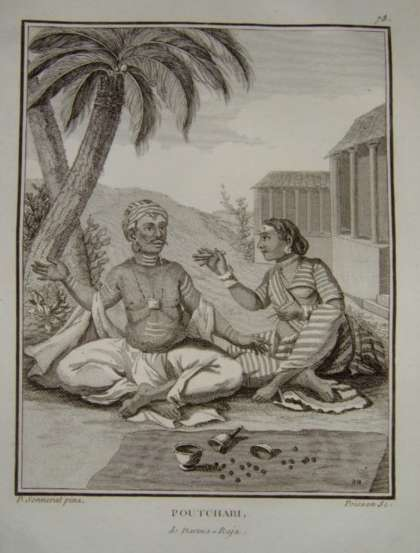
A contemporary depiction of a Pujari or Namboodiri in the court of Dharma Raja alongside his wife.

Manorama was born in February of 1760 and belonged to the Kizhakke Kovilakam of Kottakkal, a branch of the Zamorin dynasty of Kozhikode. She was a niece of Zamorin Palayath Teepetta Thampuran who famously committed suicide. Being a member of the royal family, she was fortunate to get a traditional Sanskrit education, which was not common for women at that time. She mastered the language and so got access to the treasure of knowledge on various sastras at a young age. At age 10 she notably impressed renowned scholar Chelapparambu Namboothiri. Furthermore at age 12 she was noted to have been familiar with much of Bhaṭṭoji Dīkṣita's work. Her first marriage was to a prince of the Parappanad family. After his death left with a daughter she married a Namboodiri man from the Bhattathiri community and had 5 more children, 2 sons and 3 daughters.

== Career ==
She composed several verses in Sanskrit and was known all over Kerala as a gifted poet. However, except for few shlokas, not much is available of her work.

She was also the contemporary of Sree Karthika Tirunal Balarama Varma Maharaja of Travancore (1724–98), who had the title 'Dharma Raja', meaning 'the king of righteousness'. During the time when Malabar was invaded by Tipu Sultan of Mysore, she stayed in exile at Travancore. It was during her exile at Travancore that the king completed the treatise on dramaturgy, viz. Balarama Bharatam, and Manorama Thampuratty offered her comments and suggestions, leading to its fruitful completion. Her correspondence with king Karthika Tirunal is of historic importance.

Her influence is particularly relavant to the Guru–shishya tradition to Kerala, as one of her primary disciples, who authored an edition of the Uttara Naishadha, was guru to Kodungallur Elaya Thamburan who in turn had Vaikkath Pachu Moothathu as a disciple, who was a guru of Kerala Varma Koyi Thampuran. Furthermore she is known to have educated descendants of Achyutha Pisharadi on the Raghuvaṃśa.

After 12 years, Manorama Thampuratti left Ennakkad in 1800 and returned to Malabar where she lived to 68 years old and passed away on May 23rd 1828 in Kottakkal.
