= Priyamanasam =

- Theatrical Release poster
- Priyamanasam
- Directed by: Vinod Mankara
- Written by: Vinod Mankara
- Screenplay by: Vinod Mankara
- Story by: Vinod Mankara
- Based on: Nalacharitham by Unnayi Variyar
- Produced by: Baby Mathew Somatheeram
- Starring: Rajesh Hebbar; Prateeksha Kashi
- Cinematography: Sambu Sarma
- Edited by: Hashim
- Music by: Sreevalsan J. Menon
- Production company: Soma Creations Pvt. Ltd.
- Release date: 2015
- Running time: 90 minutes
- Country: India
- Language: Sanskrit

Priyamanasam is a 2015 Indian Sanskrit-language drama film directed by Vinod Mankara. It is based on the life of writer Unnayi Variyar and his 17th-century kathakali play (attakatha) Nalacharitham. The play is a recension of Nala and Damayanti, an episode in the Indian epic Mahabharata.

Made in Kerala, it was the third Sanskrit film and the first in 22 years. It received the Best Sanskrit Feature Film Award at the 63rd National Film Awards.

== Plot ==
Set in 17th-century Kerala, Priyamanasam is about the final years of poet Unnayi Variyar as he struggles to complete his magnum opus Nalacharitham Aattakatha.

== Cast ==
- Rajesh Hebbar as Unnayi Variyar
- Prateeksha Kashi
