= TVET =

TVET or tvet may refer to:

- Thendral Vandhu Ennai Thodum, an Indian television series
- TVET (technical and vocational education and training)
