= Unnayi Warrier Smaraka Kalanilayam =

Performing arts training institution in Irinjalakuda, Thrissur District, Kerala

- Established: 1955
- Affiliations: Government of Kerala
- Vice-Chancellor: Puthur Achutha Menon
- Administrative staff: 20
- Location: Irinjalakuda Thrissur District, Kerala, India
- Campus: Irinjalakuda
- Nickname: Kalanilayam
- Website: http://www.kalanilayam.com/

Unnayi Warrier Smaraka Kalanilayam is a performing arts training institution in Irinjalakuda in Thrissur District of Kerala. The centre is affiliated with the Government of Kerala.

== History ==
The institution was established in 1955 in memory of Unnayi Variyar, renowned writer of Nalacharitham. It is governed by a body of 12 persons elected from the general council consisting of 102 life members. Former prime minister of Cochin Panampilly Govinda Menon inaugurated the centre.

== Courses and performances ==
The centre offers courses in Kathakali vesham, Kathakali music, Kathakali chenda, Kathakali maddalam, Kathakali chutty, Koppupani (crafting of accessories & other costumes), Classical music, Violin, Bharathanatyam, Mohiniattam and Kuchipudi.

Public performances are conducted on Republic Day, Independence Day, the third Thursday of every month, 6 October, 12 July and Navarathri.
