= Parinayam (1994 film) =

- VCD cover
- Directed by: Hariharan
- Written by: M. T. Vasudevan Nair
- Produced by: G. P. Vijayakumar
- Starring: Mohini; Manoj K. Jayan; Vineeth; Nedumudi Venu; Thilakan
- Cinematography: S. Kumar
- Edited by: M. S. Mani
- Music by: Songs: Bombay Ravi; Background score: Johnson
- Distributed by: Seven Arts
- Release date: 27 January 1994
- Country: India
- Language: Malayalam

Parinayam (transl. Wedding) is a Malayalam language period drama film, directed by Hariharan and written by M. T. Vasudevan Nair. The key characters are played by Mohini, Manoj K. Jayan and Vineeth. Other cast members include Thilakan, Nedumudi Venu, Oduvil Unnikrishnan, Jagathy Sreekumar, Sukumari, Shanthi Krishna, Jagannatha Varma, Valsala Menon, Bindu Panicker, and Bahadoor.

It won four National Film Awards (Best Screenplay, Best Film on Other Social Issues, Best Music Direction, and Special Jury Award for Cinematography), as well as several Kerala State Film Awards, and two Filmfare Awards South. This film deals with the mental and physical agony that a young Namboothiri widow has to undergo for losing her chastity. Parinayam is loosely inspired by the life of Kuriyedathu Thathri and revolves around Smārthavichāram — a ritualistic trial for adultery practiced among the Brahmins of Kerala. It is often regarded as a classic in Malayalam cinema.

== Plot ==
Unnimaya, a young girl, is married to Palakunnath Namboothiri, a man in his sixties, as his fourth wife. Unnimaya is an educated girl hailing from Kizhakkedath Mana, a progressive family in Kerala. Due to various social and economic factors, she is compelled to marry Palakunnath Namboothiri, an old but rich man. Coming from a progressive household, Unnimaya finds it hard to adjust to the severe orthodox practices at her new home. The sudden death of her husband brings her face-to-face with the customary rituals practiced among the Namboothiri community towards widowed women. She realizes that her widowhood makes her almost a shunned individual - one who cannot participate in any celebrations, or even attend any music/dance events or performances. Kunjunni Namboothiri, the elder son of Palakkunath, is the only person who shows compassion and support towards her. Kunjunni is actively involved in reforming the Namboothiri community and is considered a rebel among the orthodox community. Unnimaya meets Madhavan, an upcoming Kathakali artist, and falls in love with him. They share some intimate moments, and later Unnimaya realizes that she is pregnant. The orthodox Namboothiri community is shocked when it learns about her pregnancy and decides to excommunicate her through Smarthavicharam. A group of senior Namboothiris, under the leadership of Moothedath Bhattathiri, conducts a series of rituals, first to extract the name of the man who impregnated her, and later to throw her out of the community. Unnimaya expects Madhavan to come to her aid, but he lacks the courage to rescue her. Realizing that he is a coward and that she cannot expect him to deliver her out of the situation, Unnimaya decides to stand up to the orthodox Namboothiris. She answers their questions with clarity and confidence, angering them further. Ultimately, the decision is made to excommunicate her, and all the necessary rituals are completed. Kunjunni arrives as her savior. He gives her shelter at his home. The progressive Yogakshema Sabha, that he is part of, finds his ways too bohemian and dismisses him from the group. Madhavan, realizing his mistake, arrives to accept Unnimaya, but now she shows him the door, declaring that he is not the father of her unborn child and that the fathers are Arjuna, Bhima, Nala (the heroic characters performed by Madhavan as part of his dance performances). Unnimaya involves herself in social service and becomes a Congress volunteer, deciding to do something for the downtrodden members of the society.

== Cast ==
- Mohini as Unnimaya Antharjanam
- Manoj K. Jayan as Kunjunni
- Vineeth as Madhavan
- Thilakan as Moothedam
- Nedumudi Venu as Aphan Namboothiri
- Jagathy Sreekumar as Mullassery
- Oduvil Unnikrishnan as Othikkan
- Sukumari as Kunjikavu
- Shanthi Krishna as Mathu
- Ravi Menon as Krishnan
- Bahadoor as Kizhakkedam
- T. P. Madhavan
- Jagannatha Varma as Palakkunnam
- Anoop Raja as Vasudevan
- KPAC Premachandran as Thekkumthala Govindan
- Anila Sreekumar as Nanikutty
- Santhakumari as Madhavan's Mother
- Bindu Panicker as Cheriya Athemaru
- Valsala Menon as Valiya Athemaru
- Babu Swamy
- Premachandran
- Sreejaya

== Soundtrack ==
The acclaimed soundtrack of this movie was composed by maestro Bombay Ravi for which the acclaimed lyrics were penned by Yusufali Kechery. All the songs of this movie were instant hits.

Track	Song title	Singer(s)	Raga
1	"Anchu Sharangalum"	K. J. Yesudas	Maand
2	"Samaja Sancharini"	K. J. Yesudas	Kambhoji
3	"Parvanendu Mukhi"	K. S. Chithra, Chorus	Mohanam
4	"Vaishakha Pournamiyo"	K. S. Chithra	Kalyani
5	"Shanthakaram"	K. S. Chithra	Anandabhairavi
6	"Samaja Sancharini"	K. S. Chithra	Kambhoji
7	"Vaishakha Pournamiyo"	K. J. Yesudas	Kalyani

== Awards ==
National Film Awards

- Best Film on Other Social Issues - G. P. Vijayakumar
- Best Screenplay - M. T. Vasudevan Nair
- Best Music Direction - Bombay Ravi
- Special Mention for Cinematography - S. Kumar

Kerala State Film Awards

- Best Film - G. P. Vijayakumar
- Best Screenplay - M. T. Vasudevan Nair
- Best Male Playback Singer - K. J. Yesudas
- Best Female Playback Singer - K. S. Chithra
- Best Lyricist - Yusuf Ali Kechery

Filmfare Awards South

- Best Director – Malayalam - Hariharan
- Best Music Director – Malayalam - Bombay Ravi

== Controversy ==
September 1, 2024, Charmila and her friend Vishnu alleged Hariharan asked Charmila for sexual favors during film's audition.
