= Cherai Ramadas =

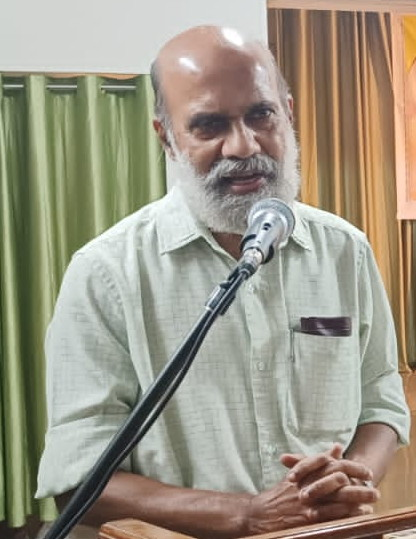
- Born: 1954 (age 71–72); Cherai, Ernakulam, Kerala, India
- Occupations: Historian, journalist, activist
- Years active: since 1972
- Known for: Historical writings, journalism
- Notable work: Kayal Sammelanam Rekhakaliloode; Thathri Samrthavicharam - Sampoornna Rekhakalum Padanangalum; Kaalasaasanakalkku Keezhadangatha Dakshayani Velayudhan; Ayyankali Prasthanam Rekhakaliloode
- Awards: Perinad Revolutionary Memorial Award

Cherai Ramadas (born 1954) is an Indian historian, journalist and activist from the south Indian state of Kerala. He is known for his historical writings and journalistic activities. He received the Perinad Revolutionary Memorial Award

Ramadas, who started out as an activist aligned to the Communist movement in Kerala at the age of 18, later turned to history and journalism. He founded the magazine Uparodham in 1987 and served as its editor and publisher. He is the author of Kaala Shasanakalkku Keezhadangatha Dakshayani Velayudhan (Dakshayani Velayudhan, who refused to succumb to the dictates of the times), a biography of Dakshayani Velayudhan, the first Dalit woman to be elected to Kerala Legislative Assembly. He compiled the documents and details of the sensational sexual inquisition of Kuriyedathu Thatri in 1905, which was later brought out as a book in 2023, under the title, Thaathreesmarthavicharam: Sampoornna Reghakalum Padanangalum (Thaathreesmarthavicharam, Complete Documents and Studies). He also contributed to the reprinting of Sankara Smriti in 2017 by serving as its editor. Kayal Sammelanam Rekhakaliloode, Ariyappedatha Da Vinci, Ambedkarude Maranam, Avarnnapaksa Rachanakal and Ayyankalykku Aadarathode are some of his other books. His latest work, Ayyankali Prasthanam Rekhakaliloode, is a 942 pages book which includes 821 documents related to the Ayyankali tradition. The book received the Perinad Revolutionary Memorial Award in 2026.

== Books ==
- Ramadas, Cherai (2025). Ayyankali Prasthanam Rekhakaliloode (in Malayalam). DC Books. p. 942. ISBN 9789370988514.
- Ramadas, Cherai (2023). "Thaathreesmarthavicharam" (in Malayalam). DC Books. p. 584. ISBN 9789357320542.
- Ramadas, Cherai; Vallarpadam, Bhuvaneswari (2023). "Kaala Shaasanakalkku Keezhatangaaththa Daakshaayany Velaayudhan" (in Malayalam). Pranatha Books. p. 264. ISBN 978-9392199608.
- Ramadas, Cherai (2022). "Kayal Sammelanam Rekhakaliloode" (in Malayalam). Pranatha Books. p. 328. ISBN 9789392199530.
- Ramadas, Cherai (2021). Sexual Inquisition (Introduction) Smaartha Vichaaram in colonial Kerala, India. ASIN B094D1TP6R.
- Lokhamde, Bhalchandra (2009). Ramadas, Cherai (ed.). "Ambedkarude Maranam" (in Malayalam). Uparodam Books.
- Ramadas, Cherai (1999). "Ariyappedatha Da Vinci" (in Malayalam). Hindustan Books. p. 73.
- Ramadas, Cherai, ed. (1997). "Awarnapaksha Rachanakal" (in Malayalam). Dooth Publishers. p. 224.

== See also ==
- Joseph Edamaruku
- Theruvath Raman
- Babu Bharadwaj
- V. K. Madhavan Kutty
