= Punyakoti =

- Poster for the film Punyakoti
- Directed by: Ravishankar Venkateswaran
- Written by: Ravishankar Venkateswaran; Anwar Ali (dialogues)
- Produced by: Sindhu SK
- Starring: Revathi; Roger Narayan; Sneha Ravishankar
- Edited by: Manoj Kannoth
- Music by: Ilaiyaraaja
- Production company: Puppetica Media
- Release dates: 20 November 2019 (NFDC Film Bazaar); 25 March 2020 (India)
- Running time: 85 minutes
- Country: India
- Language: Sanskrit

Punyakoti (transl. Meritorious act), also released as A Truthful Mother, is a 2019 Indian Sanskrit-language animated film directed by Ravishankar Venkateswaran. Ilaiyaraaja composed the soundtrack of the film. It is the first animated film in Sanskrit.

Punyakoti is an adaptation of a picture book for children written by Ravishankar, and was produced through crowdsourcing. The film got certified from Central Board of Film Certification on 18 March 2020, but its theatrical release was halted due to the COVID-19 pandemic. Finally Samskrita Bharati premiered the film through online streaming platform Vimeo on 25 March 2020 and Netflix added the film to its platform on 31 March 2020.

== Summary ==
Punyakoti is based on a Kannada language folksong in Karnataka, whose original source is the eighteenth chapter of Srishtikhand of Padma Purana, about a cow that speaks the truth at all times. The story is set in Karunadu, a village along the banks of Kaveri during the Vedic period.

== Cast ==
- Revathi as Punyakoti
- Roger Narayan as Kalinga
- Sneha Ravishankar
- SR Leela
- Vidya Shankar

== Release ==
Punyakoti was first scheduled to release in 2016 but was later delayed to 2018. The film was shown at the 2019 Film Bazaar. The film's theatre release was scheduled in April 2020 but was stopped due to the coronavirus pandemic and was released digitally on Netflix in the same month.

== See also ==
- Sanskrit cinema
