= Contessa (film) =

Contessa (2018)
- Directed by: Sudip E.S
- Screenplay by: Sudip E.S
- Story by: Riyas
- Produced by: Subash Cipy
- Starring: Appani Sarath; Sreejith Ravi; Athira Patel; Zinil Zainuddin; Hareesh Peradi; Rajesh Sharma; Kichu Tellus
- Cinematography: Ancer Thwayyib
- Edited by: Riyaz
- Music by: Gopi Sundar
- Release date: 2018
- Country: India
- Language: Malayalam

Contessa is a 2018 Indian Malayalam drama film, written and directed by Sudip E.S. The film stars Appani Sarath, Sreejith Ravi, Hareesh Peradi, Zinil Zainuddin, etc. in lead roles. The film has its story written by Riyas. This film was released on 23 November 2018.

The film received positive reviews and Critics Rating of 2.5/5 as reported by Times of India.

== Plot ==
The film narrates the story of 2 friends Chandu and Saddam Hussein and the way everything changes once a Contessa comes into their lives

== Cast ==
- Appani Sarath as Chandu
- Sreejith Ravi as "Mannu" Jayan
- Athira Patel as Jayan's daughter
- Zinil Zainuddin as Sadam
- Hareesh Peradi as Adika Ji
- Sunil Sukhada as Philip
- Kichu Tellus as S.I Shahid Moopan
- Rajesh Sharma as Pappan
- Anoop Krishnan as Rajan

== Music ==
The film music were composed by Rijosh Aluva & Jafriz and background score by Gopi Sundar.

Track listing
No.	Title	Singer(s)	Length
1.	"Unaruka Unaruka"	Mahadevan	03:05
2.	"Laila Laila"	Mithun Jayaraj	04:55
3.	"Takka Takka"	Palakkad Sreeram	03:21
4.	"Chanjum thirinjum"	Haritha Hareesh	03:53
5.	"Kannetha Doore"	Mithun Jayaraj, Uday Ramachandran	03:06
6.	"Unaruka Unaruka - Version 2"	V. T. Murali	04:30
