= Khelaghor =

Indian Bengali television series

- Genre: Drama; Romance; Thriller; Crime
- Created by: Blues Productions
- Developed by: Blues Productions
- Screenplay by: Snehasish Chakraborty
- Story by: Snehasish Chakraborty
- Directed by: Ranjoy Roy
- Creative director: Snehasish Chakraborty
- Starring: Swikriti Majumder; Syed Arefin
- Voices of: Joy Bhattacharya
- Composer: Snehasish Chakraborty
- Country of origin: India
- Original language: Bengali
- No. of seasons: 1
- No. of episodes: 628

Production
- Executive producers: Runa & Sudip (Blues Productions); Samajita, Arpita & Dipanita (Star Jalsha)
- Producer: Snehasish Chakraborty
- Production location: Kolkata
- Cinematography: Sukanta Baag
- Editors: Bapon & Sumit
- Camera setup: Multi-camera
- Running time: 22 minutes
- Production company: Blues Productions

Original release
- Network: Star Jalsha
- Release: 30 November 2020 – 4 September 2022

Khelaghor is a 2020 Indian Bengali language romantic thriller drama television series that premiered on 30 November 2020 on Bengali General Television Entertainment Channel Star Jalsha and it also available on the digital platform Disney+ Hotstar. The show is produced by Snehasish Chakraborty of Blues Productions and stars Swikriti Majumder and Syed Arefin in lead roles. On 8 August 2022, an Odia dubbed version of this show was premiered on Star Kiran. After a successful run of almost two years, the show went off-air on 4 September 2022.

== Plot ==
The story involves a rich girl, Purna Chatterjee, who gets accidentally married to an uneducated vagabond Shantu Gunda, a goon living in a slum in a twist of fate. Shantu, once a bright student, Digbijoy Roy, gets jailed for 3 years for a crime he committed accidentally and later gets hired by Gogon Makhal, the leader of a local political party. Purna is the daughter of Justice Barun Chatterjee, the judge responsible for Shantu's imprisonment. Born and brought up conservatively, she never thought of meeting a man and falling in love with him, thus agreeing for an arranged marriage with Ritam. Shantu, on the other hand applies sindoor on Purna's forehead in a fit of rage just to prove his point about marriage, but he later regrets it. Though shocked and distraught at first, Purna leaves Ritam on the very ritual whereas Ritam supports Purna and says he loves her irrespective of the accidental sindur which is not really a marriage by law. But Purna forcefully enters the slum as a newly wed bride, much to the chagrin of her father as well as Shantu. Ritam continues to love her but Purna ignores him and keeps chasing Shantu, who is also loved secretly by his childhood friend Radha. However, destiny makes many events occur in the life of Shantu and Purna which eventually make them both gets close to each other.

== Cast ==
=== Main ===
- Swikriti Majumder as Purna Chatterjee Roy – Barun and Somdatta's elder daughter; Arna's sister; Rana, Baishali, Riya, Nandini and Gargi's cousin; Shantu's wife
- Syed Arefin as Digbijoy "Shantu" Roy – Sarbojit and Panchali's youngest son; Ranjit and Ajit's brother; Purna's husband

=== Recurring ===
- Sohan Bandyopadhyay as Justice Barun Chatterjee – Kiranmala and Tarun's brother; Somdatta's husband; Purna and Arna's father
- Dolon Roy as Somdatta Chatterjee – Barun's wife; Purna and Arna's mother
- Shuvangshee Dutta as Arna Chatterjee – Barun and Somdatta's younger daughter; Purna's sister; Rana, Baishali, Riya, Nandini and Gargi's cousin
- Subhasish Mukherjee as Sarbojit Roy – Panchali's husband; Ranjit, Ajit and Shantu's father
- Mousumi Saha as Panchali Roy – Sarbojit's wife; Ranjit, Ajit and Shantu's mother
- Jayanta Dutta Barman as Ranjit Roy – Sarbojit and Panchali's eldest son; Ajit and Shantu's brother; Swati's husband
- Bulbuli Panja as Swati Roy – Ranjit's wife
- Sounak Ray as IPS Ritam Mukherjee – Partha's son; Purna's ex-fiancé
- Manishankar Banerjee as Partha Pratim Mukherjee – Ritam's father
- Biplab Bandyopadhyay as Moundip – Shantu's professor
- Sneha Das as Radha – Shantu's childhood friend and lover; Ravi's love interest
- Tapasi Roy Chowdhury as Kiranmala Chatterjee Ganguly – Barun and Tarun's sister
- Sudipa Basu as Aloka Chatterjee – Kiranmala, Barun and Tarun's sister-in-law
- Rana Mitra as Tarun Chatterjee – Kiranmala and Barun's brother; Meghna's husband
- Meghna Halder as Meghna Chatterjee – Tarun's wife
- Dipanjan Jack Bhattacharya as Rana Chatterjee – Purna, Arna, Baishali, Riya, Nandini and Gargi's cousin; Bonnie's husband
- Mousumi Bhattacharya as Bonnie Chatterjee – Rana's wife
- Sukanya Chatterjee as Baishali, Purna's eldest cousin
- Ankita Brahma as Riya, Purna's cousin
- Nondini Roy as Nondini, Purna's cousin
- Gargi Mukherjee as Gargi, Purna's youngest cousin
- Sankar Sanku Chakraborty as Gogon Makhal- a corrupt politician, Purna and Shantu's rival
- Surajit Sen as Bobin goon, Shantu's Rival
- Priyantika Karmakar as Gauri Makhal- Gogon's sister
- Judhajit Banerjee as Badal Singh
- Roosha Chatterjee as Roosha Chatterjee
- Ashim Mukherjee as Roosha's father

== Adaptations ==
Language	Title	Original release	Network(s)	Last aired	Notes	Ref.
Bengali	Khelaghor খেলাঘর	30 November 2020	Star Jalsha	4 September 2022	Original	
Tamil	Thendral Vandhu Ennai Thodum தென்றல் வந்து என்னை தொடும்	16 August 2021	Star Vijay	11 February 2023	Remake	
Kannada	Neenadena ನೀನಾದೇನಾ	16 May 2023	Star Suvarna	29 June 2025	Remake	
Malayalam	Pavithram പവിത്രം	16 December 2024	Asianet	Ongoing	Remake	
Telugu	Nuvvunte Naa Jathaga	16 December 2024	Star Maa	21 February 2026	Remake	

== Reception ==
=== Ratings ===
Week	Year	BARC Viewership		Ref.
Week	Year	TRP	Rank	Ref.
Week 51	2020	5.1	4	
Week 52	2020	5.4	5	
Week 1	2021	5.1	4	
Week 2	2021	5.0	5	
Week 3	2021	4.8	4	
Week 4	2021	4.9	4	
