= Athira Patel =

Indian actress

- Born: Athira Patel; Thiruvambady, Kozhikode, Kerala, India
- Occupation: Actor
- Years active: 2016–present
- Notable work: Angamaly Diaries (2017); Contessa (2018)

Athira Patel is an Indian actress who mainly appears in Malayalam films. She made her acting debut in 2016 with the Sanskrit film Ishti. She is best known for playing the role of Vincent Pepe's sister in Angamaly Diaries (2017).

== Personal life ==
Speaking about her last name in an interview given to the Deccan Chronicle, she said that her paternal grandfather was a village head in Karnataka, who are called Patelars, which is how her last name, Patel, was derived.

== Career ==
She did her first role in a short film named Vuja De, written and directed by Joby Varghese. Later in 2016, she debuted in a Sanskrit film Ishti in which she played the role of actor Nedumudi Venu's third wife. Patel played Mercy in the 2017 film Angamaly Diaries, which was directed by Lijo Jose Pellissery. In the same year she acted in Villain and Aadu 2.

She plays the female lead opposite to Appani Sarath in Contessa (2018).

== Filmography ==
Year	Title	Role	Notes
2016	Vuja De	She	Short film
2016	Ishti	Sreedevi	Sanskrit film
2017	Angamaly Diaries	Mercy	
2017	Villain	Malavika Mathew	
2017	Sunday Holiday	Unni's daughter	
2017	Aadu 2	Rachel	
2018	Contessa	Jayan's daughter	Lead role
2021	Pon Manickavel	Dhanya	
2022	Bhoothakaalam	Priya	
2024	Qalb	Reena	
2024	Bougainvillea	Chhaya Karthikeyan	
2026	Aadu 3	Rachel	
