= Bhagavadajjukam (film) =

Indian Sanskrit Film

- Directed by: Yadu Vijayakrishnan
- Written by: Yadu Vijayakrishnan; Dr. Aswathy Ambika Vijayan
- Produced by: Kiran Raj
- Starring: Pradeep Kumar; Jishnu V Nair; Parvathy V Nair
- Cinematography: Vipin Chandran
- Edited by: Pradeep Shankar
- Music by: Vishnu V Divakaran
- Release date: 2021
- Running time: 78 minutes
- Country: India
- Language: Sanskrit

Bhagavadajjukam (transl. The Monk and the Courtesan) is a 2021 Indian Sanskrit-language film directed by Yadu Vijayakrishnan.

Bhagavadajjukam is an adaptation of the 7th century play of the same name by Bodhayana. The film had its world premiere at the International Film Festival of India. Bhagavadajjukam won Kerala Film Critics Award for Best Sanskrit film.

== Synopsis ==
Shandilya is a disciple of Parivrajaka, a sannyasa monk. He comes across Vasanthasena, a courtesan. Vasanthasena dies on the spot as a result of Yamadoota's carelessness. Witnessing Shandilya's lamentation, Parivrajaka transfers his soul to the body of Vasanthasena. A series of humorous events ensue. The satirical story features the collision of two worlds.

== Cast ==
- Pradeep Kumar as Parivrajaka
- Jishnu V Nair as Shandilya
- Parvathy V Nair as Vasanthasena
- Saji Sopanam as Yamadoota
- Shivakumar as Vaidya
- Reshmi Kailas as the mother
- Jwala S Parameswar as Madhukarika

== See also ==
- Sanskrit cinema
