= Nalacharitham =

Kathakali play written by Unnayi Warrier

Nalacharitham is a Kathakali play (Aattakatha) written by Unnayi Warrier. Based on the Mahabharatha, it tells the story of King Nalan and his consort Damayanthi. The play consists of four parts – called First, Second, Third and Fourth Day – each part being long enough to be performed over a full night. The source of the story is the tale of Nalan and Damayanthi as told in the Mahabharatha . In the 18th century, Unnayi Warrier structured the contents of this story as Nalacharitham Attakatha to suit the art-form Kathakali. Nalacharitham is considered the most romantic work of art constructed on the classical basement of Kathakali, which has earned it the epithet of being the Shakuntalam of Malayalam literature.

== First Day: Nalcharitham Onnam Divasam ==
Story line: Sage Naradan tells Nalan about Damayanthi and the need to marry her. Hamsam acts as the messenger to Damayanthi and fills her mind with love for Nalan.

=== Scene 1 – Nalan and Naradan ===
Sage Naradan reaches Nalan's kingdom Nishadha and tells Nalan that in Kundinapuri, there is a beautiful damsel named Damayanthi who is sought after even by gods and he should marry her. Nalan wonders what right he, as human being, had to contest with the gods to marry her. But Naradan assures him that as a king, he should endeavour to do it. The Sage wishes him all success and takes leave. Nalan indulges in thoughts about the beauty of Damayanthi. He visualises her in all splendor in every part of her body and comes to the conclusion that he will have no peace of mind until he marries her. He is so astounded by the transcendent charm of Damayanthi that he entrusts his duties as the King to his Minister and goes to the royal garden to find some peace of mind.

=== Scene 2 – Nalan in the royal garden ===
In the royal garden, Nalan, enraptured by the description of the beauty of Damayanthi, is further bewitched by the breeze carrying the perfumes of flowers, the trees embraced by flowering jasmine plants, the dancing peacocks and the sound of sweet-singing birds. He sees three swans of different colours on the banks of the pond nearby, of which a golden one engrosses his attention immensely.

=== Scene 3 – Entry of Hamsam (the golden swan); Nalan and Hamsam ===
The golden swan Hamsam, spends some time singing and dancing on the banks of the river, and after eating lotus fruits, it proceeds to rest on a lotus leaf. Though bereft and yearning of the damsel Damayanthi, Nalan observes the golden Hamsam during his wanderings in the garden. He catches the bird unawares in its sleep, without disturbing it. The swan, finding itself captured, starts crying aloud that the king is killing it. It is worried about its fate and the thought of its old mother, wife and children becoming orphans in its absence. The King says that he had no intentions of hurting it. He only thought of possessing that virtuous and golden bird as a pet. He allows the bird to fly away freely. When the bird is gone, Nalan once again falls back into his reverie about Damayanthi.

Hamsam, extremely pleased with the righteousness of the King, returns to thank the King and to do something in return for his kindness. It tells the King that it would help him to marry. The bird captures the King's heart by describing the singular beauty and demeanor of Damayanthi. In addition, Hamsam also promises the King Nalan, that it would do his best to persuade Damayanthi to marry him. Nalan is extremely pleased for the favor that came unasked. He hugs the bird as his dearest friend, and sends it as his messenger to Damayanthi.

=== Scene 4 – Damayanthi and her companions ===
Damayanthi, on hearing about the virtues of King Nalan from elsewhere, and tormented by the arrows of Kamadeva the god of love, walks around in her garden along with her hand-maidens. To her great surprise and happiness, Hamsam flies in like lightning descending from the heavens. When the swam comes closer, she asks the others to keep away and approaches the bird. But Hamsam continues to move away slowly, luring Damayanthi further and further away from her company. Once assured that they were beyond the reach of the others, Hamsam chides her, saying that though she was grown up enough, her childishness had not lessened, and she were seen trying to embrace the bird, she would be ridiculed. She needn't catch the bird, because it could be trusted. The bird also blessed her to get a King as her husband, who was an ardent lover and her desired sweetheart. The bird earns the trust of Damayanthi by revealing that it lived in the Kingdom of Nalan, tutoring ladies in their etiquette and comportment. Damayanthi, in turn, persuades the Hamsam to describe the beauty and virtues of King Nalan.

Speculating about her secret love for King Nalan, Hamsam encourages her to speak out what she had in her mind, treating it as a friend. Hamsam learns that Damayanthi had been thrust deeply by the arrows of Kamadeva, the god of love. Hamsam declares its intent and conviction – that Nalan and Damayanthi are the best suited couple. Damayanthi entreats the bird to carry her message back to King Nalan, so far kept a secret. To confirm her intention, the Hamsam uses a ploy – it asks her what would happen if she were given away in marriage to somebody else, and would she bestow her love on him? For it would be a deceit if her words turned out to be false. Hamsam insists on getting a prompt answer and Damayanthi assures the bird that none other than Nalan can secure her love, as a river can ultimately flow only into the sea. No hill, even if it tried its best, can change the course of the river. Convinced, Hamsam becomes happy and gets ready to leave, when Damayanthi pleads to it to describe what Nalan looks like. Hamsam draws the image of King Nalan on a lotus leaf. Damayanthi embraces the picture with great relief and sees the bird off. Damayanthi watches the bird flying away, with her mind full of love and gratification.

== Second Day: Nalcharitham Randam Divasam ==
(Story line: Nalan marries Damayanthi, a disappointed Kali sees them dethroned and exiled, suffering and separation in the forest, Damayanthi rescued from a python by a hunter.)

Overcoming many hindrances, Nalan marries Damayanthi and begins to live a happy life. Nalan expresses his affection to her in the Royal garden.

=== Scene 1 – Nalan and Damayanthi in the Royal garden ===
Entranced in the beauty of the garden, Damayanthi describes the pleasant sights there — the plants that denote the arrival of spring, flowers covered by beetles, sweet songs of birds and humming of beetles — all appear to her as praise of Kama. Nalan tells her about the troubles he had to overcome to make her his own. They spend some time in the garden, immersed in pleasant exchanges.

=== Scene 2 – Entry of Kali and Dwaparan ===
When the gods return to heaven after participating in the marriage of Nalan and Damayanthi, they happen to meet Kali, escorted by Dwaparan. On enquiries, Indran learns that Kali is on his way to marry Damayanthi, unaware that her wedding was over. Indran tells him that his attempt was like trying to build a dam when all the water had flowed out, because Damayanthi had already married a virtuous man named Nalan. When Kali learns that his desire was not to be fulfilled, he becomes angry and vows that he would not allow them to live together happily and he would do all that he could to separate them. The gods try to dissuade Kali from his attempt, and proceed to heaven.

=== Scene 3 – Scheming the plot: Kali and Dwaparan ===
They together plot the scheme to separate Nalan and Damayanthi. Since Nalan was very righteous, Dwaparan tells Kali that he could be trapped only through deceit in playing dice. They together decide to persuade Nalan's younger brother Pushkaran to challenge Nalan for a game of dice, in which Nalan could be defeated and exiled.

=== Scene 4 – Pushkaran, Kali (കലി) and Dwaparan ===
Pushkaran welcomes the unexpected visitors and describes his pathetic life where he had no royal powers. While enquiring about the purpose of their visit, he also exposes his inferiority complex. Extremely pleased with this congenial situation, they promise Pushkaran to help him defeat Nalan in a game of Dice, send him to the forest and make Pushkaran the King of the land. കലി offers himself as the stake for Pushkaran to start the game, and on being encouraged by the two, Pushkaran challenges Nalan for a game of Dice.

=== Scene 5 – Nalan, Pushkaran – game of dice, defeat of Nalan ===
Under Kali's influence, Pushkaran abuses Nalan and challenges him for a game of dice. Nalan, with Damayanthi, comes out of the Palace and tries to dissuade him by scolds and threats. But Pushkaran insists on playing. After a long altercation between the two, Nalan finally sits down to play. With only an ox at stake for Pushkaran, Nalan confidently puts his country and all his wealth at stake, without any fear of being defeated. One by one, Nalan loses all his wealth and the situation comes to such a pass that if he contested again, he would lose his Kingdom and would have to go to the forest. Unruffled by the attempts of Damayanthi to dissuade him from this mad game, Nalan loses everything at stake and Pushkaran wins hands down. As if this were not enough, Pushkaran drives Nalan and Damayanthi out of the country with the worst of abuses. Having lost everything except the dress they were wearing and insulted to the core, Nalan and Damayanthi walk away grief-stricken, which Pushkaran enjoys best.

=== Scene 6 – Nalan and Damayanthi in the forest ===
Helpless and frustrated, Nalan and Damayanthi wander in the forest, tortured by hunger and thirst. They happen to see two birds in front of them. Without knowing that they were the same Kali and Dwaparan disguised as birds, Nalan takes off his cloth to use as a net to catch the birds. Immediately, the birds fly away with his only piece of cloth, and Kali enters Nalan, which drives him crazy and senseless. The couple continues to wander aimlessly.

=== Scene 7 – Nalan and Damayanthi in the deep forest ===
While wandering through a thick forest, they reach a shelter in the midnight, extremely tired. Fully aware that all their prosperity had vanished, Damayanthi tries to console Nalan. Nalan tries to persuade her to go back to the Palace. But she reminds him of her duty as a committed wife to accompany him wherever he was. Overcome by hunger and thirst, she rests her head on her husband's lap and sleeps.

Being under the influence of Kali, Nalan is distraught by the thoughts of going through the forest along with his wife without any protection and the dangers involved. He thinks that Damayanthi might be safe if she were left alone. Suffering from an unsound mind, he decides to leave Damayanthi to her fate. He lifts her head with trembling hands and lays it down on the floor. He covers his nakedness with one half of the dress torn from Damayanthi’s and leaves her in distress, after praying to all gods to look after her.

=== Scene 8 – Damayanthi ===
Waking up from deep sleep and finding herself alone in the midst of a thick forest, Damayanthi is terrified by her loneliness and sorrow. When she doesn’t find Nalan near her, she calls for him to stop hiding and appear before her. She finally realises that she had been abandoned, he might perhaps be gone in search of some cloth to cover him up. She curses Kali, the being responsible for this fate of hers, and walks away through the forest.

=== Scene 9 – The Entry of the Hunter ===
A hunter, sleeping in the forest, used only to the sounds of birds and animals, suddenly wakes up hearing human cries and sits up wondering from where it could be. He arms himself with weapons and walks towards the direction from which the sound originated. He realises that it is the sound of a beautiful woman crying for help. He enjoys her beauty from behind a tree and approaches her with wrong intentions.

=== Scene 10 – Damayanthi and the Hunter ===
Damayanthi finds her leg caught within the jaws of a python. She is sure that she would die and prays to her husband to remember her kindly when he hears of her death. She then observes the Hunter approaching her with bad intentions. Unaware of the plight of Damayanthi, he entreats her to hold on to his shoulder when he sees the python attempting to swallow her. He takes up his bow and arrow, kills the python and saves her.

Damayanthi thus saved, the hunter continues with his amorous pleas, but she tries to dissuade him. When he persists with his demand, she has no other go but to use the boon given by Indran – that anyone attempting to molest her chastity will turn into ashes. She finds her saviour burning into ashes, thanks the god for making his boon true and continues to walk further along the forest in search of her husband.

(Synopsis of the rest of the story: Damayanthi wanders in the forest, gets rescued by a group of merchants, finds refuge in Chedi Kingdom, is detected by the Brahmanan sent by her father on that errand and is taken to her kingdom where she joins her father Bhiman.)

== Third Day: Nalacharitham Moonnam Divasam ==
(Story line: Nalan bitten by serpent, changes appearance, seeks shelter at Kosalam, hears about Damayanthi’s second marriage, frees himself from Kali by learning the secret mantra)

=== Scene 1A – Nalan alone ===
Having deserted Damayanthi and finding himself alone, Nalan wails to all gods why he was destined to suffer such a fate. All the good things he had done, the boons bestowed on him by the gods and the daily worship he had offered to all the Gods are of no avail now, when he swerved a little from the path of righteousness. He consoles himself by the thought that all this was a turn of Destiny. His only desire was that Damayanthi should not suffer. He should not be termed a coward, for forsaking his wife. He repents and prays for a better turn of events.

=== Scene 1B ===
Nalan consoles himself through some philosophical ideas, arguing that the forest was a much better place than the city to live in. The beings in the city are cruel both inside and outside; in the forest, there are pleasant rivers, beautiful trees and small huts, which give greater happiness than the gruelling emotions of the outer world. Immersed in such comforting thoughts, he feels that Fate was growing more kind towards him.

=== Scene 2 – Nalan and Karkotakan ===
Involved in such confused thoughts and moving around aimlessly, Nalan hears someone calling him, crying to be rescued, from the midst of a wild fire. Since he had received the boon that fire could not burn either him or those who touch him, Nalan runs into the fire and saves the serpent that was trapped in the fire. When rescued, the serpent wants Nalan to count from one to ten. When he reaches ten, the serpent bites him and makes him unrecognisable. Flustered with anger and sorrow, Nalan asks the serpent why it did so to its saviour. The serpent reveals itself as Karkotakan, a great one among the most venomous, who was cursed by a Sage and given the reprieve that Nalan would rescue it. Karkotakan also tells him that the venom was injected into him to drive away Kali that had infested him and he would soon join Damayanthi. Nalan is gifted with a holy piece of cloth, wearing which he would return to his original appearance. He is advised to stay incognito as Bahukan in the kingdom of Kosalam, serving King Rithuparnan. When he acquires the Akshahrudaya Manthra from the King, Kali would jump out of his body and thus, Nalan would be completely relieved of all worries and join Damayanthi. Karkotakan blesses him to enjoy all prosperity and Nalan walks towards the Kingdom of Rithuparna.

=== Scene 3A – Kingdom of Kosalam – King Rithuparna, Jeevalan, Varshneyan and Bahukan ===
As directed by Karkotakan, Bahukan requests the King for a chance to serve him. The King allows him to stay there with the other two servants as a cook and chariot-driver.

=== Scene 3B – Bahukan’s house – Bahukan, Jeevalan and Varshneyan ===
While living in Kosalam in all comforts, one day when the other two servants were deep asleep, Bahukan is worried about what might have happened to his beloved. He finds consolation in the thought that the couple had been profusely blessed by gods and nothing untoward could happen. When Jeevalan overhears his wailings, he is inquisitive, but Bahukan answers that it was only a sad song that he had created. Bahukan evades continued questionings and does not reveal his real identity.

(In the meantime, after reaching her father's court, Damayathi had sent around Brahmins in search of Nalan all around the country. Of these, one named Parnadan happened to bring the news that a person befitting her clues was there in the court of Rithuparna, living in the name of Bahukan. Damayanthi consults her mother and decides on the future course of action.)

=== Scene 4 – Sudevan, Damayanthi ===
Following the cue from Parnadan, Damayanthi concludes that her dear was living in hiding in Kosalam. She asks a trustworthy Brahmin named Sudevan to reach Kosalam and do his best to enable her re-union with her husband. He promises to undergo any risk to bring them together. The King of Kosalam was well known to him and he would declare in the presence of Nalan (Bahukan) that Damayanthi’s second marriage was planned for the next day, and the King was invited to take part. Assuring Damayanthi of all success, he starts on his trip towards Kosalam.

=== Scene 5A – Rithuparnan, Bahukan, Jeevalan, Varshneyan, Sudevan ===
Sudevan informs Rithuparnan, in the presence of Bahukan, about the second marriage of Damayanthi taking place the next day. On hearing this, Bahukan is shocked and upset, but he doesn’t show it. The lecherous Rithuparna immediately orders Bahukan to take him as fast as possible to Kundinapuri.

=== Scene 5B – Bahukan’s aside ===
The thought of the second marriage of Damayanthi appears to Bahukan as poison itself. He is further upset because he was chosen to drive the chariot. He is worried about the turn of events, but has a faint hope that she would not marry again. The King arrives there in the chariot along with Varshneyan and the three together proceed towards Kundinapuram.

Both Rithuparna and Varshneya are surprised at the speed with which Bahukan drives the Chariot. The King’s upper cloth falls down and he asks Bahukan to slow down. Bahukan asks him whether the piece of cloth or attending the marriage was important. Extremely pleased with the character of Bahukan, Rithuparna show him the trick of counting the number of leaves on a tree beside the path. Bahukan insists on learning it and the King teaches him that mantra (Akshahrudaya Manthra, which has the power of driving away Kali from his body).

== Fourth Day: Nalacharitham Naalam Divasam ==
When Rithuparnan escorted by Bahukan arrives at the Court of King Bhiman, quite contrary to his expectation of seeing the court crowded with Kings, he finds himself alone. Bahukan, though much agitated, maintains a calm demeanor. There were no signs of any preparations for marriage. Rithuparna decides to cover up his foolishness by pretending that he had come only to refresh his friendship with King Bhiman. Within the Queen’s chamber, Damayanthi concludes that the King could have reached there so fast only because Nalan had driven the chariot. Rithuparnan is welcomed in the Court by the King and he is hosted in the Guest house.

(Story line: Damayanthi identifies Bahukan as Nalan with the help of Kesini; he regains his beauty, resolve misunderstandings, and reunite.)

=== Scene 1 – Damayanthi and Kesini in the Queen's apartment ===
Eager to see the most handsome face of her husband Nalan, Damayanthi sends her companion Kesini to watch the ugly figure accompanying Rithuparnan, with instructions to observe his manner of eating and sleeping.

=== Scene 2 – Guest house – Bahukan, Kesini ===
Kesini approaches Bahukan and asks him who he was and why he had come there. Though it was evident to Nalan that the marriage of Damayanthi was false information, Bahukan tells her the truth that they had come for the second marriage of Damayanthi. She tells him that, being separated from Nalan, Damayanthi had lost all interest in life and enquires whether he had any news about Nalan. Bahukan is a bit shaken, but tells her he never heard of Nalan and had no idea whether he was hiding somewhere or not.

Once the second marriage had been fixed, she had no reason to think of Nalan and women of high origin should not be angry with their husbands whatever wrong they had done. Kesini’s doubts increased when she heard the details of the conversation with Parnadan. Bahukan sends her away because it was not proper for strangers to be seen together at untimely hours. But, Kesini hides herself there and keenly observes Bahukan, who by the powers of his boons cooks without using fire, turns dry flowers fresh with his touch, and many other strange acts of his. She goes back to Damayanthi convinced that she had discovered something important.

=== Scene 3 – Damayanthi, Kesini ===
Kesini describes to Damayanthi what she observed about Bahukan. Damayanthi feels assured that Bahukan is Nalan himself, but wonders about the change in his appearance and is confused about the next step. She thinks that her husband was not angry with her and yet even if it ended up in her death, which would be better than this pain of separation, she decides to meet him and pay a wife’s obeisance.

=== Scene 4 – Bahukan, Damayanthi ===
With the permission of her mother, Damayanthi goes to Bahukan. Though tense on seeing his beloved after long, he controls his emotions and becomes repentant. She asks him quite touchingly whether he had seen her loved one anywhere. Nalan is exhilarated at this meeting and doesn’t bother to listen to her tearful words. She was sure that the height, behaviour and actions of Bahukan were exactly that of Nalan, but wonders where his beautiful looks had gone. He, in the meanwhile, wears the holy cloth gifted by Karkotakan and regains his original shape. But instead of being pleased, he abuses Damayanthi more and more.

Damayanthi approaches him with surprise and happiness, but Nalan drives her away, asking her to go ahead with the second marriage as planned and live with some king that she liked. Completely shattered by the abuses of Nalan, Damayanthi explains that the news of the second marriage was only a ploy to regain Nalan, as advised by her mother. Refusing to believe anything of what she says, Nalan turns away from Damayanthi, when he hears a voice from nowhere: “I am Vayudeva telling you that the idea of a second marriage was only a trick employed by her to bring Nalan back to her and there was no reason to doubt her!” This is followed by requests from the gods in heaven, shower of flowers from all around and sacred sounds of musical instruments. Nalan embraces her lovingly with a breaking heart in such a holy atmosphere and consoles her. Then they exchange their experiences during the period of separation and proceed towards the King’s Palace.

== Adaptation ==
It was adapted into a Sanskrit film, Priyamanasam, by Vinod Mankara. The third Sanskrit film overall, it focuses on the life of Variyar and how the play was created.

== See also ==
- Classical Indian dance
- Arts of Kerala

== Bibliography ==
Jours d'amour et d'épreuve, l'histoire du roi Nala, Unnâyi Vâriyar, traduit du malayalam, présenté et annoté par Dominique Vitalyos, pub. Gallimard, 1995, "Connaissance de l'Orient"
