= Amma Marathanalil =

- Directed by: Jibin George James
- Screenplay by: Jibin George James; Sreekanth Sreekumar
- Produced by: Jibin George James; Justin Chacko Koyikkara
- Starring: Anoop Krishnan; Sreekanth Sreekumar; Justin Chacko Koyikkara; Fathima Nowshad; Jithu Menon Karattu; Devasurya
- Cinematography: Baiju Ramapuram
- Edited by: Jobins Sebastian
- Music by: Shine Pulikkal
- Production companies: Koyikkara Cine House; Chithrasala Film Club
- Distributed by: NNG Films
- Release date: 25 December 2021
- Running time: 122 minutes
- Country: India
- Language: Malayalam

Amma Marathanalil is a 2021 Indian Malayalam-language film, produced by Jibin George James and Justin Chacko Koyikkara, helmed by debutant Jibin George James himself, with Anoop Krishnan playing the lead role. As per the director, the film is an attempt to draw attention, "to a nostalgic journey into that simple, beautiful, green world of a Malayali, which is being lost with each and every passing moment".

== Plot ==
Amma Marathanalil says the importance of environment and nature for the peaceful life of human beings and tries to bring back the true-blue Malayali roots.

== Cast ==
- Anoop Krishnan
- Sreekanth Sreekumar
- Justin Chacko Koyikkara
- Ameer Ali
- Jithu Menon Karattu
- Sunil Vikram
- Karthik Poonthanam
- Fayees Nowshad
- Devasurya
- Shalini Dinesh
- Sini Prasad
- Jaseena Jaseem
- Fathima Nowshad

== Production ==
Actor Anoop Krishnan, who plays Prakashan put on weight to play a matured communist party follower, who has a deep sense of attachment to the sacred grove and the crowded trees in his Tharavad, where he always feels his mother's presence. A crowdfunded project, the film was completed in 22 days for a mere budget of 3,00,000 rupees at the locations of Pattambi.
