= Pavithram (TV series) =

Indian Malayalam-language TV series

- Genre: Drama; Romance; Thriller
- Based on: Khelaghor
- Screenplay by: Ficsmith Creatives
- Directed by: Sunil Kariattukara
- Starring: Surabhi Santosh; Sreekanth Sasikumar
- Music by: P G Rajesh
- Country of origin: India
- Original language: Malayalam
- No. of seasons: 2
- No. of episodes: 468

Production
- Producers: Peter Sundar Dhas (2024—2026); P. Ramadevi (2026 — present)
- Editors: Vishnu Pradeep; Aby D. Varghese
- Camera setup: Multi-camera
- Running time: 22 minutes
- Production companies: The Alive Media (2024 — 2026); Green TV (2026 — present)

Original release
- Network: Asianet; JioHotstar
- Release: 16 December 2024 – 30 April 2026
- Network: JioHotstar
- Release: 13 July 2026 – present

Related
- Khelaghor

Pavithram (transl. Sacred) is an Indian Malayalam-language romantic thriller drama television soap opera. It is directed by Sunil Kariattukara. It is an official remake of Bengali soap opera Khelaghor. It stars Surabhi Santosh and Sreekanth Sasikumar as lead roles. The title song for the series is sung by K.S Chithra and Anusree.

The first season of the show aired from 16 December 2024 to 30 April 2026 on Asianet and also streaming on JioHotstar. The second season of the show started streaming from 13 July 2026 on JioHotstar. Through the second season, the show became first Malayalam soap opera to premiere directly on OTT platform.

== Series overview ==
Series	Episodes	Originally released		
Series	Episodes	First released	Last released	Network
1	368	16 December 2024	30 April 2026	Asianet; JioHotstar
2	100	13 July 2026	present	JioHotstar

== Plot ==
=== Season 1 ===
Vedha is a principled young woman who lives according to strong religious and traditional beliefs. Her life is turned upside down when a series of unexpected events leads to Vikram, a man known for his troubled past, tying a thali around her neck, forcing them into marriage. Unable to accept the circumstances, Vedha initially despises Vikram and holds him responsible for shattering her dreams. Despite their differences and constant conflicts, the two gradually develop mutual understanding, and their relationship eventually blossoms into love.

As Vikram and Vedha begin building a life together, they become the targets of a conspiracy orchestrated by Sreekanth, Chandrashekaran, and members of Vedha's own family, who are driven by greed for her property. Their schemes ultimately result in Vikram being falsely accused of his friend Aniyankuttan's murder and imprisoned. Soon afterward, Vedha learns that she is expecting Vikram's child. While trying to cope with his imprisonment, she discovers that Sreekanth intends to kill her unborn baby to gain control of her wealth. Determined to protect her child, Vedha leaves her home and sets out on her own. The first season ends with Vikram behind bars and Vedha on the run, leaving their future uncertain.

=== Season 2 ===
Following Vikram’s life imprisonment, his pregnant wife, Vedha, flees to Delhi to escape Sreekanth, who has ordered her and her unborn child killed. With the help of an ally, Sethulakshmi, Vedha narrowly evades the thugs and safely delivers her baby. Meanwhile, tragedy strikes on both sides: Vikram's mother, Kamala, passes away, leaving him volatile in prison, while Sethulakshmi's daughter-in-law, Radhika, dies from pregnancy complications. To keep her newborn safe, Vedha hatches a plan to join Sethulakshmi's household. However, seeing her son Tharun bond deeply with Vedha's baby after losing his own wife, Sethulakshmi grows increasingly worried about the aftermath.

== Cast ==
Main

- Surabhi Santhosh as Sub Collector Vedha Vikram
- Sreekanth Sasikumar as Vikram Sudhakaran

Recurring

- Nayana Josan as Radha
- Anila Sreekumar as Kamala, Vikram's mother
- V.K.Baiju as Sudhakaran, Vikram's father
- M.G. Sasi as Sreekaryam Srinivasan
- Kalamandalam Radhika as Ammini Achamma
- Reena as Savithri amma, Vedha's grandmother
- Vinay Menon as Justice Shankaranarayanan, Vedha's father
- Meera Mahesh as Deepthi
- Bibin Nair as Adv. Darshan
- Santosh Sasidharan as Vishwan
- Shivakami as Shreeja
- Kiran Sariga as Vinayakan
- Anu Pillai as Nandhini
- Simi Thomas
- Aleena Treesa George as Varsha
- Maya Krishna as Malathi
- Prabha Shankar
- Alif Shah as Sreekanth
- Benny Verghese as S.I.Babu
- Vijaya Krishnan as Aniyankuttan
- K.P.A.C Rajendran (2025, deceased) as Aniyankuttan's father
- Ajay Kallayi as Joseph
- Pavithran
- Shyam Gangotri
- Anu Lakshmi
- Swathy Nithyanand as Radhika
- Kiran Nambiar as DCP Tharun Dabang
- Sabitta George/Sindhu Varma as Sethulakshmi
- Lishoy as Aravindan
- Sonu Ann Jacob as Aami
- Mridula Vijay as Dr Ishitha
- Janvi Muraleedharan as Young Veda

== Reception ==
Following table is the TRP performance of Pavithram according to the Broadcast Audience Research Council (BARC) ratings.

Month / Period	Rank	Ref
December 2024	5	
April 2025	3	
May 2025	4	
July 2025	4	
September 2025	4	
October 2025	5	
November 2025	5	
January 2026	5	
February 2026	5	
March 2026	5	
April 2026	4	

== Music ==
Rachillamel Chayunnitha, with lyrics by K. Gireesh Kumar and music by Gokul Sreekandan, is the title song of the series. It is performed by K.S Chithra and Anusree Anilkumar. Another song, Premakashame features lyrics by K. Gireesh Kumar, music composed by Midhun Malayalam and vocals by Sreerag and Anusree Anilkumar; It released on Valentine's Day 2025.

No.	Title	Lyrics	Music	Singer(s)	Length
1.	"Rachillamel Chayunnitha"	K. Gireesh Kumar	Gokul Sreekandan	K.S Chithra, Anusree Anilkumar	3:07
2.	"Premakashame"	K. Gireesh Kumar	Midhun Malayalam	Sreerag, Anusree Anilkumar	3:37

== Awards ==
Year	Award	Category	Recipient(s)	Result	Ref.
2026	Asianet Television Awards	Best Serial		Nominated	
2026	Asianet Television Awards	Popular Serial		Nominated	
2026	Asianet Television Awards	Best Actor (Special Jury)	Sreekanth Sasikumar	Won	
2026	Asianet Television Awards	Popular Actor	Sreekanth Sasikumar	Won	
2026	Asianet Television Awards	Popular Actress	Surabhi Santhosh	Won	
2026	Asianet Television Awards	Best Supporting Actor	V K Baiju	Won	
2026	Asianet Television Awards	Popular Character Actor	V K Baiju	Won	
2026	Asianet Television Awards	Best Supporting Actress	Anila Sreekumar	Won	
2026	Asianet Television Awards	Popular Character Actress	Anila Sreekumar	Nominated	
2026	Asianet Television Awards	Popular Star Pair	Sreekanth Sasikumar, Surabhi Santhosh	Won	
2026	Asianet Television Awards	Best Director	Sunil Kariattukara	Won	
2026	Asianet Television Awards	Popular Director	Sunil Kariattukara	Nominated	
2026	Asianet Television Awards	Best Screenplay (Adapted)	K Gireesh Kumar	Won	
2026	Asianet Television Awards	Best Videography	Priyadarshan PS	Won	
2026	Asianet Television Awards	Best Editor	Vishnu Pradeep	Won	
2026	4th Kerala Vision Television Awards	Best Antagonist	Alif Shah	Won	

== Adaptations ==
Language	Title	Original release	Network(s)	Last aired	Notes	Ref.
Bengali	Khelaghor খেলাঘর	30 November 2020	Star Jalsha	4 September 2022	Original	
Tamil	Thendral Vandhu Ennai Thodum தென்றல் வந்து என்னை தொடும்	16 August 2021	Star Vijay	11 February 2023	Remake	
Kannada	Neenadena ನೀನಾದೇನಾ	16 May 2023	Star Suvarna	29 June 2025	Remake	
Malayalam	Pavithram പവിത്രം	16 December 2024	Asianet	30 April 2026	Remake	
Telugu	Nuvvunte Naa Jathaga నువ్వుంటే నా జాతగా	16 December 2024	Star Maa	21 February 2026	Remake	
