= Thendral Vandhu Ennai Thodum =

Indian television series

- Genre: Action; Drama; Romance; Thriller
- Inspired by: Khelaghor
- Written by: Blues Productions; Nandhan Shridharan (season 1); V.S Kumaran (season 2)
- Story by: Nandhan Sridharan; M. Kasthoori
- Directed by: Abdul Kabeez Hafees
- Starring: Vinoth Babu; Pavithra Janani
- Theme music composer: Ilayavan
- Country of origin: India
- Original language: Tamil
- No. of seasons: 2
- No. of episodes: 686

Production
- Executive producers: G. Pradeep; Milroy Peter
- Producers: R.Raajesh; Box Studio and Samukha Entertainment
- Cinematography: V.S Saravana Kumar
- Editors: Vijay Krishnan; Anand Raj
- Camera setup: Multi-camera
- Running time: 22 minutes
- Production companies: Thalir Productions (season 1); Box Studios and Sumukha Entertainment (season 2)

Original release
- Network: Star Vijay
- Release: 16 August 2021 – 11 November 2023

Thendral Vandhu Ennai Thodum (transl. The Breeze Will Come and Touch Me) is an Indian Tamil-language television series which aired on Star Vijay. It is a remake of the television series Khelaghor which originally aired on Star Jalsha, although the plot eventually deviates from the original plotline. The series premiered on 16 August 2021 and concluded on 11 November 2023, spanning 686 episodes.

Thendral Vandhu Ennai Thodum was dubbed in Telugu as Chirugaali Veechene, which aired on Star Maa from 10 October 2022 to 2 May 2023. However, Chirugaali Veechene was cancelled after airing only 177 episodes out of the planned 686. Thendral Vandhu Ennai Thodum began re-airing on Colors Tamil on 23 June 2025.

== Plot ==
=== Season 1 (Episodes 1–454) ===
Thendral Vandhu Ennai Thodum is set in Kanchipuram and begins with the introduction of the protagonists, Abhinaya "Abhi" and Vetriselvan "Vetri" . Abhi, the eldest daughter of Sankaranarayanan "Sankar", a reputed judge known for his honesty, integrity, and discipline, lives with her mother Padma. She has just returned from the United States of America after completing her higher education. Abhi is bold, mature, and straightforward, yet sweet, calm, and traditional in nature. Her marriage has been arranged with her childhood friend Darshan, a lawyer who is the brother-in-law of Surya, Abhi's cousin, and a businessman managing Sankar's enterprises.

On the other hand, Vetri is a rowdy and the trusted right-hand man of Poongavanam, a powerful local politician and don (crime boss). Vetri and Poongavanam use their influence to combat illegal activities such as drug and liquor smuggling, kidnapping, and prostitution, aiming to benefit the community. Vetri's family includes his father Aranganathan, a retired schoolteacher who disapproves of his son's rowdyism; and his mother Kamala, who adores Vetri and often criticises her husband for his strict treatment of their son. Vetri has two elder brothers: Kalaiselvan "Kalai", who is lazy and lacks steady employment; and Anbuselvan "Anbu", a real-estate broker. Kalai's wife, Nandhini, is diligent and caring, treating Vetri like her own son. Anbu's wife, Chitra, is selfish and gossipy, neglecting household duties.

Radha, Vetri's neighbour and childhood friend, works as an auto driver and has harboured one-sided feelings for Vetri since childhood.

Abhi and her family visit the temple to ensure her wedding proceeds smoothly. Simultaneously, Vetri heads to the same temple on Poongavanam's orders because Poongavanam's driver has eloped with a minister's daughter and the minister plans to marry her there. Inside the temple, a mysterious sage (wise person) encounters Abhi and predicts that she will marry a rogue, though Abhi initially disregarded. Abhi dismisses the sage's prediction, and later assists the eloping couple in their marriage ceremony.

However, Vetri arrives and threatens the newlyweds, even attempting to remove the thali from the bride. Abhi intervenes and slaps Vetri for his persistent attempts to take off the bride's thali. In the midst of their argument, Vetri takes a thali from the temple deity (Thirunankata Amma), and ties it around Abhi, arguing that it is merely a chain. Abhi's family and Vetri's gang, which includes Gopalakrishna "Chithapu", Peithevan "Pei", Quarter, and Seenu, are shocked by his actions.

A furious Surya decides to file a police complaint against Vetri, leading to his arrest. Meanwhile, Sankar forbids Abhi from entering the house unless she removes the thali. Despite persuasion from her family to undergo rituals to remove it, Abhi realises her faith in the thali, considering it a divine gift. Refusing to remove it, she leaves her home, angering her father, who disowns her, along with most of the family, except Darshan, Padma, and her widowed aunt Sivagami, who is Surya's mother.

Abhi manages to bail Vetri out, but he shows no gratitude and demands that she discard the thali. Another sage predicts that Vetri will marry a woman who will bring prosperity into his life, though Vetri remains unaware of this prophecy.

Abhi decides to take revenge on Vetri for ruining her life and forcibly inserts herself into Vetri's neighbourhood, waiting outside his house in the rain despite attempts by him and his gang to shoo her away. However, the next morning, Vetri's rival Senba harasses Abhi, prompting Kamala to bring her inside their house. Abhi quickly gains the support of most members of Vetri's household with her mature and calm demeanour, except for Vetri himself and Chitra, who continuously schemes to eject her from the house.

Over the following months, Abhi tries to reform Vetri and help him understand the concept of love, but he angrily rebuffs her efforts and refuses to acknowledge her as his wife. However, when Vetri brutally assaults Praveen, the son of powerful MLA Asokan and Poongavanam's rival, for raping a young girl, Abhi witnesses the attack and testifies against Vetri in court despite pleas from Kamala and Vetri's gang not to do so, leading to his arrest.

Vetri's entire family, except for Aranganathan, turns against Abhi, but she remains resolute in her decision. However, Vetri is unexpectedly acquitted with the assistance of Sankar, shocking everyone. Sankar, despite his hatred for Vetri and refusal to forgive him for ruining Abhi's life, defends Vetri in court because he supports his actions against Praveen.

Later, Asokan kidnaps Abhi to seek revenge against Vetri, but Vetri manages to rescue her, deepening his animosity towards her even further. Kamala, Vetri, and Chitra oppose Abhi's return to the house but reluctantly allow her to stay after Aranganathan intervenes on her behalf.

Later, in a conversation with Nandhini, Abhi learns the reasons behind Vetri's involvement in rowdyism, his loyalty to Poongavanam, and Aranganathan's animosity towards him. Previously, Vetri was an academically brilliant student whose success brought joy to the family, especially Aranganathan, who favored him as his favorite son. However, Vetri fell victim to drug peddlers who operated near his college, selling ganja and other narcotics to students. Refusing their drugs, Vetri intervened when they attempted to sell ganja to a female student, leading to a confrontation where Vetri thrashed the peddlers. In retaliation, the peddlers framed Vetri for drug smuggling, resulting in his arrest.

Poongavanam, who fought against drug smuggling, bailed Vetri out of jail. Despite Poongavanam's support, Aranganathan disowned Vetri, refusing to believe his innocence and ejecting him from the house. This marked the beginning of their discord. Vetri found acceptance in Poongavanam's home and, upon completing his education, chose to become a rowdy and work for Poongavanam as a sign of gratitude. Despite Poongavanam's advice to pursue a legitimate job, Vetri embraced rowdyism, believing in Poongavanam who accepted him when his family did not.

Learning about Vetri's troubled past, Abhi empathises with him and begins to develop feelings for him, despite his lingering animosity towards her. Meanwhile, Sankar is kidnapped by thugs hired by a powerful corporate magnate, retaliating against Sankar's verdict against his company. Vetri rescues Sankar with the condition that Abhi leaves him. Tearfully, Abhi reluctantly departs Vetri's home and returns to her family, where she is welcomed back by everyone, including Sankar and Surya.

Sankar and Surya decide to arrange Abhi's marriage to Shakthi, her cousin settled in the UK, who is also Vetri's childhood friend unaware of his rowdy past and his history with Abhi. Despite Abhi's objections, she is coerced into accepting the marriage by Sankar. Meanwhile, Kamala and Aranganathan plan to marry Vetri to Radha, despite Vetri's resistance, hoping marriage will reform him. Both weddings are scheduled on the same day at the same temple.

While evading the police, Vetri is shot in the leg and is badly wounded. He contacts Abhi, who rescues and treats him at her home without her family's knowledge. This experience makes them both realise their love for each other but they are too proud to admit it. Vetri discovers Shakthi is marrying Abhi but remains silent about his past with her out of loyalty. Despite loving Abhi, Vetri decides to marry Radha to not disappoint her. However, on the wedding day, Vetri cannot contain his love for Abhi any longer and interrupts his wedding to declare his feelings just as Shakthi is about to tie the thali around Abhi's neck.

Relieved and overjoyed, Abhi leaves her wedding and reunites with Vetri, leading to their disownment by both families. Hurt by Vetri's actions, Radha turns against him and seeks revenge.

Poongavanam assists the reunited couple by sending them to stay with his friend in Ponneri for a few days. However, when Vetri becomes personally involved in the activities of a powerful local don named Ponnaiya, even going so far as to severely injure him, Abhi convinces him to return home. Except for Kalai and Nandhini, the rest of the family refuses to accept them, with Kamala particularly adamant about not allowing them back into the house.

With Kalai and Nandhini's help, Abhi and Vetri set up their new home—a tent on the terrace—which frustrates Kamala and Chitra. Abhi encourages Vetri to find a job and avoid conflicts, which he agrees to, but he refuses her suggestion to leave Poongavanam behind. Understanding Abhi's decision, Poongavanam refrains from involving Vetri in criminal activities. However, Vetri struggles to find steady employment due to his criminal record.

Abhi also assists Nandhini in establishing a tailoring business, which becomes profitable thanks to Abhi's business acumen, bringing newfound prosperity to Vetri's family. Kalai, shedding his laziness, actively participates in the business as well.

Meanwhile, Poongavanam's nephew Bhavani arrives in Kanchipuram from Mumbai, having escaped a police encounter in Dharavi. Bhavani, a hardened criminal, engages in illegal activities such as drug and liquor smuggling, kidnapping, etc., without his uncle's knowledge. He even gains the support of Seenu for his operations. Vetri discovers Bhavani's illicit activities but hesitates to expose him because Poongavanam admires Bhavani and sees him as his successor, especially since Poongavanam has no sons.

Simultaneously, Aranganathan decides to legally marry Vetri and Abhi, as their marriage is not recognised by society. On the eve of the wedding, Vetri learns about Seenu's betrayal. Seenu reveals that Bhavani plans to assassinate Poongavanam and take control of his crime syndicate. Vetri expels Seenu and rushes to Bhavani's hideout, where a confrontation ensues. During the altercation, Vetri accidentally kills Bhavani with a blow to the head using a log. Distraught by the act of taking another person's life, even an enemy's, Vetri decides to keep the murder a secret from Abhi and everyone else and proceeds with the wedding the next day.

Poongavanam eventually discovers that Vetri killed Bhavani but does not understand the circumstances. Feeling betrayed, Poongavanam turns against Vetri. Vetri renounces his life of crime, becomes a mini-truck driver, returns home at Aranganathan's request (who reconciles with Vetri for abandoning his rowdyism), and leads a peaceful life with Abhi. Abhi soon becomes pregnant, bringing joy to Vetri and the family. Kamala also forgives Abhi and Vetri. Sankar and Abhi's family also accept Vetri, and Sankar resolves to clear Vetri of all charges, so that he can pursue the Civil Services Examination and become an IPS officer.

Despite finding happiness and contentment, Vetri remains haunted by guilt over Bhavani's death.

Meanwhile, Bhavani's long-lost identical twin brother, Parameswaran "Parama", arrives in Kanchipuram with the intent to avenge his brother's death at the hands of Vetri. In his pursuit, he meets Radha, initially planning to use her to get to Vetri, but ends up falling in love with her. Radha reciprocates Parama's feelings, and he becomes involved in illegal activities similar to his brother's.

At the same time, Darshan, now an IPS officer, is appointed as the new Superintendent of Police (SP) for Kanchipuram District. He takes charge of investigating Bhavani's murder, with Vetri as the prime suspect. However, further investigation reveals discrepancies in Vetri's testimony—he did not have a knife when Bhavani was killed, and it was determined that Bhavani was stabbed, not fatally struck by Vetri's blow during the fight. Abhi and Sankar recognise these inconsistencies, and realise that Vetri is innocent.

Sankar decides to represent Vetri as his lawyer. With Poongavanam's support (who has learned about Bhavani's true nature and forgiven Vetri), they delve into the case. During the investigation, Vetri is shocked to discover that Nandhini was Bhavani's actual killer. Bhavani's men had mistakenly assaulted Kalai, believing him to be Abhi (as ordered by Bhavani), prompting Nandhini's desire for revenge. She followed Vetri to Bhavani's hideout, witnessed their altercation, and, to protect Vetri and seek retribution, fatally stabbed Bhavani when he attempted to shoot Vetri.

Upon hearing Nandhini's confession, Vetri decides to shoulder the blame for Bhavani's death. He understands the family's dependence on Nandhini and fears Kalai's devastation if she were arrested. Promising Nandhini to keep her secret, including from Abhi, Vetri falsely admits in court that he killed Bhavani in self-defense. He is sentenced to six years in prison.

Heartbroken by Vetri's apparent betrayal and believing he lied to protect Bhavani's true murderer (unaware that Nandhini is the culprit), Abhi leaves Vetri's home, deeply saddened.

=== Season 2 (Episodes 455–686) ===
6 years later

After serving six years for falsely confessing to Bhavani's murder on behalf of Nandhini, Vetri is released from prison. He meets with Kalai and Nandhini, who inform him that Abhi left their home after his arrest, and they don't know her whereabouts. Vetri also learns that Aranganathan died during his imprisonment, and Kalai couldn't arrange for him to attend the last rites. Refusing to return home, Vetri searches Kanchipuram for Abhi and eventually finds her house.

There, Vetri discovers that Padma also died while he was in prison. Sankar, now retired and still resentful of Vetri for lying in court about Bhavani's murder, informs Vetri that he doesn't know Abhi's location, but reveals that she aborted their child before disappearing. Devastated by this revelation, Vetri's love for Abhi turns into profound hatred, and he leaves her house, refusing to continue searching for her.

Distraught and disillusioned, Vetri reverts to his previous life as a rowdy, adopting vices like smoking and drinking. Over time, he ascends to become Kanchipuram's primary rowdy, eventually succeeding Poongavanam, who has also died.

2 years later

Unknown to anyone, including her own family, a heartbroken Abhi spent the next eight years in both Rajasthan and Andhra Pradesh following Vetri's arrest. During this time, she successfully cleared the Civil Services Examination and became a collector. It is also revealed that she did not abort her child. Before disappearing, she instructed her father to lie to Vetri about aborting their child, wanting to sever ties completely.

Abhi and Vetri's daughter, named Sudarvizhi "Sudar", is now eight years old. After a confrontation with a powerful figure in Andhra Pradesh, Abhi is transferred back to Kanchipuram District by the government. Reluctantly accepting the transfer, as she wants to avoid her old life, Abhi moves to Kanchipuram with Sudar and Vijayalakshmi "Viji", who cares for Sudar.

Further revelations show that Radha married Parama and is now a councillor. She struggles to oppose Vetri's actions, while Parama continues his criminal activity without Radha's knowledge.

During a riot at a temple, Abhi orders the closure of the temple. Vetri defies her orders and breaks the seal to reopen it. After eight years, their paths cross again, and Abhi arrests Vetri for disobeying her orders. She also apprehends Chithapu, Quarter, and Pei based on a complaint filed by Radha, accusing them of extortion. They are all released on bail, facilitated by Kanmani, a lawyer whom Vetri supported in her legal studies when she was younger.

Kanmani accommodates Vetri and his henchmen in her house, much to her father's dismay, as he struggles to tolerate Vetri's drunken behaviour. It is revealed that Kanmani harbours unrequited love for Vetri.

Parama devises a plot to have Vetri killed in retaliation for Bhavani's death. When his henchmen attempt to execute the plan, Sudar warns Vetri, enabling him to fend off the attackers. However, Sudar herself gets injured in the process. This incident brings Vetri and Sudar closer together. They begin spending a lot of time together, forming a strong bond without Abhi's knowledge, unaware that they are father and daughter.

Vetri remains unaware that Sudar's mother is Abhi and believes Viji to be her mother. Through their growing relationship, Sudar gradually influences Vetri to abandon his drinking habits and undergo positive changes in his life.

Abhi and Vetri simultaneously uncover a drug scam, involving drug-infused chocolates sold to children. Seeking revenge, the mastermind behind the scam, Ponnaiya from Vetri's past, decides to eliminate Abhi. Initially failing with Parama's assistance, Ponnaiya orchestrates a plan, where his men crash a lorry into the car carrying Abhi and Sudar. While Abhi escapes with minor injuries, Sudar sustains severe injuries and falls into a coma.

Vetri rushes to the hospital upon hearing about the accident. There, he discovers that Sudar is Abhi's daughter, and is overjoyed to learn that Sudar is his own daughter as well. However, Kanmani, present at the hospital, fears a potential reconciliation between Vetri and Abhi. She fabricates a story, claiming that Sudar is indeed Abhi's daughter but not Vetri's biological child. Kanmani falsely asserts that Sudar's father is Dr. Tharun, who had been Abhi's friend during her time in Andhra Pradesh and is not married to her. To further deceive Vetri, Kanmani shows him a photoshopped image of Tharun supposedly marrying Abhi, and reiterates the lie that Vetri's biological child was aborted.

Believing Kanmani's deceit, Vetri is devastated but resolves to maintain his bond with Sudar and vows to protect her. Meanwhile, Sudar miraculously recovers and returns home. Abhi, with Kanmani's assistance, uncovers Ponnaiya's involvement in the lorry crash and has him arrested for his crimes.

The incident involving Ponnaiya prompts Abhi to seek enhanced security for Sudar, and tasks Tharun with finding a new bodyguard. Upon Viji's recommendation, Tharun selects Vetri for the role, without knowing about Vetri's history with Abhi or his past as a rowdy. Abhi initially hesitates to hire Vetri, fearing that Sudar may develop a close bond with him and eventually discover their true relationship. However, she reluctantly agrees under the condition that Vetri keeps his past a secret from everyone, especially Sudar, and focuses solely on his duties.

Vetri moves into Abhi's house and proves to be an exceptional bodyguard for Sudar, strengthening their bond further. However, Kanmani collaborates with Parama and publishes an article in the newspaper falsely accusing Vetri of killing Bhavani. This accusation becomes the last straw for Abhi, who dismisses Vetri from his position and expels him from her house, despite pleas from Sudar and Viji.

Meanwhile, Vetri plans to arrange Kanmani's marriage and ensure her settlement in life. However, Kanmani insists on marrying only Vetri, and sabotages two marriage proposals he arranges for her. Kanmani and her father pressure Vetri to marry her. Initially refusing, Vetri eventually agrees under pressure from Kamala, who believes Kanmani's false claim that Abhi has remarried, and from Sudar, who wants Vetri to marry Kanmani so he won't feel lonely.

Viji and Nandhini are shocked upon hearing the news and try to persuade Abhi to cancel the wedding and reconcile with Vetri, but she refuses. Viji, aware of Kanmani's plot to keep Abhi and Vetri apart, rushes to the wedding to expose Kanmani. She confronts Chitra at the wedding hall and manages to convince her of Kanmani's deceitful intentions. However, when Chitra confronts Kanmani, she is knocked unconscious. Kanmani manipulates Kamala and the family into believing that Viji is trying to stop the wedding.

Meanwhile, Vetri, suspicious of Kanmani's behaviour, hires a hacker to trace the mysterious calls that Kanmani made to interfere with Abhi's and Vetri's relationship and disrupt her marriage proposals. The hacker traces the calls back to Kanmani. This, combined with Chitra revealing Kanmani's lies to Vetri, infuriates him. He confronts Kanmani, who anticipated these events, and deflects blame onto her father. The wedding is called off, but Sudar's true identity remains unknown.

The incidents at the wedding hall slowly prompt Vetri to investigate whether Sudar is his daughter. When he attempts to gather information from Viji and Sudar about Sudar's mother, Viji refuses to divulge the truth, insisting that Vetri should hear it directly from Abhi. Meanwhile, Sudar, following Abhi's instructions, falsely claims that Viji is her mother.

On several occasions, Vetri asks Abhi about Sudar's parentage, but Abhi repeats the lie that their child was aborted and expresses her unforgiving stance toward Vetri for his perceived betrayal. Kanmani, scheming to prevent Vetri from discovering that Sudar is his daughter, stokes (pokes) Vetri's lingering resentment toward Abhi. She frames Vetri for selling illegal liquor, which was actually sold by Parama and which resulted in the deaths of six people. Despite Vetri's efforts to destroy the liquor in front of Abhi, Kanchipuram SP Kabilan and witnesses, Kanmani's plot implicates Vetri as a wanted criminal.

Vetri flees to Rajasthan, where Sudar is rumored to have been born, with Abhi and Kabilan in pursuit. He manages to obtain Sudar's birth certificate, but before he can examine it, Kabilan arrests him and subdues him when he attempts to escape. Abhi retrieves the birth certificate to prevent Vetri from seeing it. During their return journey to Kanchipuram, Parama's henchmen confront Abhi and Kabilan, incapacitating Kabilan and abducting Abhi.

Vetri regains consciousness, confronts the henchmen, rescues Kabilan and Abhi, and retrieves the birth certificate in the ensuing struggle. The birth certificate confirms that he is indeed Sudar's father. Overwhelmed with happiness upon discovering the truth, Vetri regrets abandoning Abhi and Sudar. Realizing Vetri's innocence, Kabilan and Abhi release him.

The trio returns to Kanchipuram, where Vetri's newfound knowledge brings profound reconciliation and understanding.

Meanwhile, Madhu, Bhavani's widow, arrives in Kanchipuram seeking vengeance on Vetri for killing her husband. Kanmani, aware of Madhu's arrival and driven by her desire to have Vetri for herself, manipulates Madhu into targeting Abhi and Sudar instead of Vetri. Kanmani believes that isolating Vetri from Abhi and Sudar will leave him vulnerable.

Initially, Kanmani tries to force Abhi's transfer out of Kanchipuram by orchestrating kidnappings and falsely implicating Abhi. When this fails, Kanmani sends Madhu to infiltrate Abhi's household disguised as a tribal woman named Shenbagam. Madhu's role as a servant in Abhi's household is part of Kanmani's plan to drive a wedge between Abhi and Viji, aiming to eliminate Viji so that she can proceed with her deadly intentions against Abhi and Sudar.

Madhu's efforts succeed in causing friction between Viji and Abhi, leading Viji to consider leaving Abhi's household. However, Vetri intervenes, persuading Viji to stay for Sudar's sake. Eventually, Viji returns to Abhi's home, and Abhi forgives her.

In parallel, Parama is involved in smuggling temple idols to foreign countries. Radha, personally investigating the smuggling case, discovers Parama's involvement. Confronting him, Radha learns about his illegal activities and how he framed Vetri for many of them. Disgusted by Parama's actions, Radha decides to expose him to Vetri but is captured and imprisoned by Parama in an abandoned factory.

Despite being held captive, Radha manages to contact Vetri and informs him about Parama's crimes and Kanmani's plan to harm Abhi and Sudar. Vetri rushes to the factory but arrives too late—Radha dies in his arms after being stabbed. Before her death, Radha tries to warn Vetri about the danger facing Abhi and Sudar.

Abhi and Kabilan, knowing Vetri's character, believe in his innocence regarding Radha's murder. Vetri, convinced of Parama's love for Radha despite his criminal activities, also believes in Parama's innocence. Together with Kabilan, Vetri investigates Radha's murder and Shenbagam's true identity (suspecting Madhu's presence in Abhi's house for ulterior motives).

Realizing that Vetri has uncovered her crime and that her ambitions of marrying him are shattered, Kanmani attempts to kill Vetri, Abhi, and Sudar. However, she is arrested before she can carry out her plan. Parama is also apprehended for his involvement in the temple idol smuggling.

This series of events brings justice and closure, with Kanmani, Madhu, and Parama facing the consequences of their actions, and Vetri finding vindication while protecting Abhi and Sudar.

With all of Abhi's enemies out of the way, she decides to dismiss Vetri and cut ties with him and Sudar. She also opts for a transfer to Northeast India to distance herself from Vetri. Hurt by Abhi's repeated attempts to separate him from Sudar, Vetri snaps and reveals to Abhi that he is Sudar's father. However, he insists that he never mentioned this fact to Sudar and has no intention of doing so. Abhi promises Vetri that she won't disclose the truth to Sudar, but gives Sudar one month to "find her father". If Sudar fails to do so, she will have to accompany Abhi to the Northeast.

After a month passes, with Vetri keeping his promise and Sudar unable to discover the truth, Abhi prepares to leave for the Northeast despite protests from Sudar and Viji. However, on their way to the airport, they are ambushed by Kanmani, who has been released on bail, and her accomplices. Kanmani stabs Abhi multiple times in the abdomen and escapes. Vetri arrives just in time to rush Abhi to the hospital, where her condition is critical.

Meanwhile, Nandhini, feeling guilty for her role in separating Vetri and Abhi, breaks her promise to Vetri and confesses to Kalai that she killed Bhavani years ago. Kalai urges Nandhini to inform Abhi of the truth to prevent her from leaving Kanchipuram. However, they realise Abhi's critical condition and rush to the hospital. Abhi calls Sudar into her room and reveals that Vetri is her father. She admits that although Vetri wasn't a good husband, she believes he will be a good father to Sudar if she doesn't survive.

Sudar seeks confirmation from her grandfather, Sankar Narayanan, about Vetri being her father, shocking everyone in Vetri's family. Kamala and Nandhini are overjoyed by the revelation. Nandhini uses this revelation to blackmail Vetri into meeting Abhi or facing Kabilan.

Nandhini meets Abhi and discloses the truth about Bhavani's murder. Abhi is devastated and breaks down, regretting how she treated Vetri. She realises that Vetri took the blame for someone else, and now knows it was Nandhini. Abhi and Vetri apologise to each other, reconciling their relationship.

Later, Kanmani attempts to sneak into the hospital to kill Abhi. However, Parama, who has escaped from prison, arrives and kills Kanmani for her role in Radha's death. Parama surrenders himself to the police, bringing closure to the ordeal.

Abhi makes a successful recovery. She and Kabilan decide to drop the murder charges against Nandhini, while Sankar once again exonerates Vetri from all his cases so that he can pursue his dream of becoming an IPS officer. Vetri and Abhi, reunited, along with Sudar and Viji, return to Vetri's home. They live happily ever after with Kamala, Kalai, Nandhini, Anbu, Chitra, Kalai and Nandhini's daughter Malar, and Anbu and Chitra's newborn son.

The series concludes with Vetri, now an IPS officer, being appointed as the SP for Kanchipuram. He and Abhi, still serving as the collector for Kanchipuram District, depart for work together. Vetri's reformed family and gang, along with Viji, bid them a happy farewell.

== Cast ==
=== Main ===
- Vinoth Babu as SP Vetriselvan IPS "Vetri" Aranganathan – A rowdy turned police officer and ex-convict who took the blame for Bhavani's murder; Araganathan and Kamala's youngest son; Kalai and Anbu's brother; Abhi's husband; Sudar's father
- Pavithra Janani as IAS Abhinaya "Abhi" Vetriselvan – Kanchipuram's district collector; Sankar Narayan and Padma's elder daughter; Deepthi's sister; Surya's cousin; Vetri's wife; Sudar's mother
- Samridha Sam as Sudarvizhi "Sudar" Vetriselvan – Abhi and Vetri's daughter
- Shaurya Shashank Ramesh as
  - Bhavani – Parama's identical twin brother, Madhu's husband (2021-22) (Dead)
  - Parameswaran "Parama" – Bhavani's identical twin brother; Radha's husband (2022-23)
- Maria Juliana as Kanmani – Vetri's one-sided lover (Dead)

=== Supporting ===
- Krithika Laddu as Vijayalakshmi aka Viji – Abhi's sister-figure; Sudar's caretaker
- Tharshika as Radha Parameswaran – Vetri's ex-fiancée; Parama's wife (Dead)
- Reehana B as Madhu/Shenbagam - Bhavani's wife turned widow; Vetri's arch-rival
- Sasindhar Pushpalingam as Tharun – A physician from Hyderabad; Abhi's friend and brother-figure
- Feroz Khan as Kanchipuram SP Kabilan – Abhi's friend and helper
- Auditor Sridhar as Judge Sankar Narayan – Sivagami's brother; Padma's widower; Abhi and Deepthi's father; Sudar's grandfather
- J.Lalitha as Padma Sankar Narayan – Sankar's wife; Abhi and Deepthi's mother; Sudar's grandmother (Dead)
- Shravnitha Srikanth as Deepthi Sankar Narayan – Sankar Narayan and Padma's younger daughter; Abhi's sister; Surya's cousin (2021–2023)
- Anjali Varadharajan as Sivagami – Sankar Narayan's sister; Surya's mother; Abhi and Deepthi's aunt (2021–2023)
- Dev Anand Sharma as Surya – Sivagami's son; Abhi and Deepthi's cousin; Varsha's husband
- Bharani Elangovan as Varsha Surya – Chidhambaram and Chandra's daughter; Tharshan's sister; Surya's wife
- Supergood Kannan as Poongavanam – A local politician; Vetri's mentor (Dead)
- Premalatha as Poongavanam's wife
- L. Raja as Aranganathan – Kamala's husband; Kalai, Anbu and Vetri's father; Sudar's grandfather (Dead)
- Priya as Kamala Aranganathan – Aranganathan's widow; Kalai, Anbu and Vetri's mother; Sudar's grandmother
- Sathya Sudha as Kalaiselvan "Kalai" Aranganathan – Aranganathan and Kamala's eldest son; Anbu and Vetri's Elder brother; Nandhini's husband (2021–2023)
- Rajkumar Manoharan as Anbuselvan "Anbu" Aranganathan – Aranganathan and Kamala's second son; Kalai's youngest brother and Vetri's elder brother; Chitra's husband (2021–2023)
- Remyaa Joseph as Nandhini Kalaiselvan – Kalai's wife; Bhavani's murderer (2021–2023)
- Syamantha Kiran as Chithra Anbuselvan – Anbu's wife (2021–2023)
- Krishna Kishore / Manoj Kumar as Tharshan Chidhambaram – Lawyer turned police officer; Chidhambaram and Chandra's son; Varsha's brother; Abhi's ex-fiancé
- Vasu Vikram as Chidhambaram – Chandra's husband; Tharshan and Varsha's father
- Rekha Suresh as Chandra Chidhambaram – Chidhambaram's wife; Tharshan and Varsha's mother
- Gowthami Vembunathan as Eeswari – Radha's mother
- Kausalya Senthamarai / S. N. Parvathy as Aranganathan's mother; Kalai, Anbu and Vetri's grandmother
- Dhanasekar as Gopalkrishna – Vetri's fellow henchman
- Paranthaman as Quarter – One of Vetri's henchmen
- Krishna Kumar as Pei (Peiathevan) – One of Vetri's henchmen

=== Cameo ===
- VJ Vishal as Shakthi, Vetri's childhood friend, Abhi's cousin (9 June – 6 July 2022)
- Hensha Deepan as Ramya, a criminal who was hired by Vetri's rival, Senba, to coerce him and have him arrested for adultery (14 – 25 December 2021)
- Aranthangi Nisha as Angel
- Singapore Deepan

== Production ==
=== Release ===
Thendral Vandhu Ennai Thodum was announced to be released on 16 August 2021.

=== Casting ===
Vinoth Babu was cast as the male lead, playing Vetri, marking his second collaboration with Abdul Hafeez after they worked together on Sundari Neeyum Sundaran Naanum. Pavithra Janani was cast as the female lead, playing Abhi, marking her fifth serial after her role as Malar in Eeramana Rojave.

For the second season of the show, Maria Julianna was cast to play Kanmani, a lawyer with a one-sided love for Vetri, while Sudar Sam was brought in to play Sudar, the child of Abhi and Vetri.

== Controversy ==
In the launch promo of Thendral Vandhu Ennai Thodum, Vetri argues with an eloping couple at the temple, claiming that love marriage is invalid. He attempts to remove the thali from the eloping woman's neck, when Abhinaya intervenes and slaps him. In anger, Vetri takes the thali from the deity's neck and puts it around Abhi's neck, saying angrily, "Just tying a yellow rope is enough. Now I will be your husband, I've put a Bindi as well, go away."

The concept received widespread criticism from feminists, who slammed it as outdated, along with criticism for the initial concept the show is based on.

== Crossovers ==
Thendral Vandhu Ennai Thodum had crossover with Namma Veettu Ponnu, which took place from 15 November 2021 to 27 November 2021.

== Reception ==
Thendral Vandhu Ennai Thodum has ranked among the most-watched serials in the Vijay TV noon band. The onscreen pair of Vetri and Abhi has captivated the audience. The series is also noted for its diverse shooting locations, such as Kodaikanal, the seaside, and Rajasthan.

== Adaptations ==
Language	Title	Original release	Network(s)	Last aired	Notes	Ref.
Bengali	Khelaghor খেলাঘর	30 November 2020	Star Jalsha	4 September 2022	Original	
Tamil	Thendral Vandhu Ennai Thodum தென்றல் வந்து என்னை தொடும்	16 August 2021	Star Vijay	11 February 2023	Remake	
Kannada	Neenadena ನೀನಾದೇನಾ	16 May 2023	Star Suvarna	29 June 2025	Remake	
Malayalam	Pavithram പവിത്രം	16 December 2024	Asianet	Ongoing	Remake	
Telugu	Nuvvunte Naa Jathaga నువ్వుంటే నా జాతగా	16 December 2024	Star Maa	21 February 2026	Remake	
