= Sunil Kariattukara =

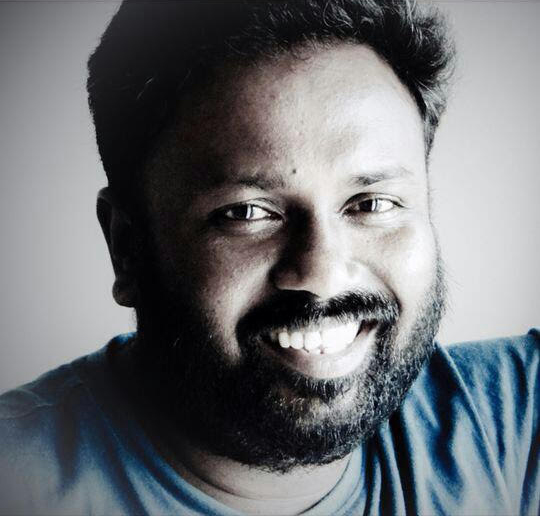
- Born: Kariattukara, Kerala, India
- Occupation: Film Director
- Years active: 2000s - Present

Sunil Kariattukara is a filmmaker from Kerala.

== Career ==
Sunil started his career with theatre in the early 1990s. He worked with Jain Joseph, K. Gireesh Kumar, Prem Prakash, K.V Ganesh at that period. He directed a few plays and later associated to Root Theatre, Thrissur which was led by Jose Chiramel.

His passion towards visual arts moved him to cinema in late 1990s, started as an assistant director.

In the 2000s he was associate director to Rosshan Andrrews, B. Unnikrishnan, Priyanandanan, Salim Ahamed etc. in their most successful projects.

His debut film, Chacko Randaaman released in 2006. Actor Kalabhavan Mani performed three different characters in the film. Second film Pakida released in 2014 starring Biju Menon, Asif Ali.

== Filmography ==
Year	Title	Director	Associate Director
2002	Neythukaran		Yes
2005	Udayananu Tharam		Yes
2006	Notebook		Yes
2006	Chacko Randaaman	Yes	
2006	Smart City		Yes
2008	Madampi		Yes
2009	Evidam Swargamanu		Yes
2009	I G Inspector General		Yes
2010	Pramani		Yes
2010	The Thriller		Yes
2012	Grandmaster		Yes
2011	Adaminte Makan Abu		Yes
2014	Pakida	Yes	
2015	Pathemari		Yes
2018	Kammara Sambhavam		Yes
2022	Theerppu		Yes
2023	Picaso	Yes	
2024	Her	Yes	

== Television ==
Year	Serial	Channel	Notes
2017-2018	Kasthooriman	Asianet	
2018-2019	Seethakalyanam	Asianet	
2020	Kudumbavilakku	Asianet	
2022–2025	Bhavana	Surya TV	
2024	1000 Babies	JioHotstar	Chief Associate Director
2024–2026	Pavithram	Asianet	
2026–Present	Pavithram 2	JioHotstar	
