= G. Prabha =

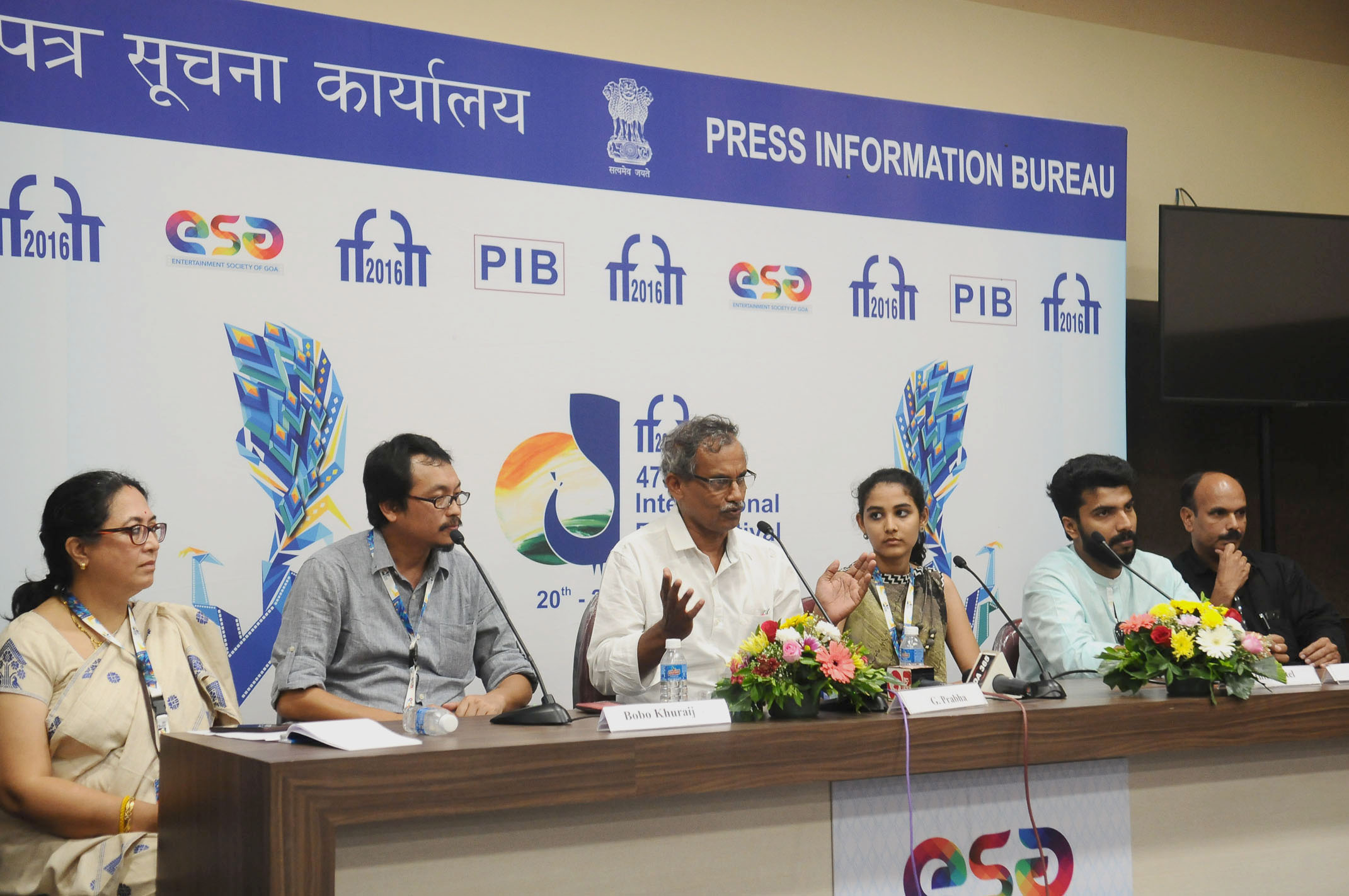
- G. Prabha, IFFI (2016)
- Occupations: Professor, writer, film-maker

Dr. G. Prabha (born 1 May 1956) is an Indian filmmaker, writer, and retired professor of Sanskrit. He is best known for writing and directing Ishti (2016), which was the first Sanskrit-language feature film to deal with a social theme rather than a mythological or biographical subject.

== Early life and education ==
He pursued higher education in Sanskrit, eventually earning a doctorate from the University of Madras in 2001.

== Academic career ==
Prabha began his career as a journalist before transitioning into academia. He served as a faculty member at Government Sanskrit College in Tripunithura, Kerala, and St. Joseph's College in Tiruchirappalli. He later joined Loyola College, Chennai, where he served as the Head of the Department of Oriental Languages and Professor of Sanskrit until his retirement in 2014. During his academic tenure, he published 26 research papers and authored several books in Malayalam and Sanskrit.

== Filmmaking career ==
Prabha's filmmaking often focuses on social reforms within the Namboothiri Brahmin community of Kerala, influenced by the works of reformers like V. T. Bhattathiripad. In 2016, he released his debut feature film, Ishti (English: Search for the Self). Starring Nedumudi Venu, the film explores patriarchy and the denial of education to women in early 20th-century Kerala. Ishti was selected as the opening film for the Indian Panorama section at the 47th International Film Festival of India.

His second feature film, Taya (2022), also in Sanskrit, is a feminist narrative based on the historical Smarthavicharam (trial for adultery) of Kuriyedathu Thathri in 1905.

Prior to feature films, Prabha directed two notable documentaries:

- Agnaye: A documentary documenting the Athirathram (Agni Yagam) ritual.
- Akkitham: A biographical film about the Jnanpith Award-winning Malayalam poet Akkitham Achuthan Namboothiri.

== Filmography ==
Year	Title	Language	Role	Notes
2010	Akkitham	Malayalam	Writer, Director	Documentary
2014	Agnaye	Malayalam	Writer, Director	Documentary
2016	Ishti	Sanskrit	Writer, Director	First social-themed Sanskrit film
2022	Taya	Sanskrit	Writer, Director	

== Literature & Published Works ==
His literary contributions include research studies, short story collections, and commentaries on classical Sanskrit texts.

Category	Title	Nature of Work
Sanskrit Study	Ascarya Cudamani: Text and Practice	Research-based study.
Short Stories	Paramanandam Enna Paulo Gabriel	Malayalam short story collection.
Short Stories	Jenni Orkkunidathe	Malayalam short story collection.
Short Stories	Kaakkakal Karayunneram	Malayalam short story collection.
Commentary	Sivapadadikesavarna stotram	Commentary on devotional text.
Commentary	Sivakesadipadavarnana stotram	Commentary on devotional text.
Literary Work	Sri Balabhagavatham	Retold version of the classic.
Screenplay	Akkitham	Documentary screenplay.
Edited Work	A.K.G Navathi Smriti	Editor.
Script	Agnaye	Research documentary script.

== Awards & Recognition ==
- Best Shooting Award: 17th Pyongyang International Film Festival (2018) for Ishti.
- Best Sanskrit Film: 8th Nashik International Film Festival for Ishti.
- Best Documentary Film: National Academy of Cinema and Television, Bangalore (2014) for Agnaye.
- Best Director: Kerala Film Audience Council (2010) for the documentary Akkitham.
- Dr. T.N. Anathakrishnan Research Award: (1998–1999 and 2012–2013).

== References & Links ==
1. "Spotlight on orthodoxy - Sanskrit film Ishti deals with a social theme". The Hindu. November 19, 2015. ISSN 0971-751X.
2. "Celebrating his life and work". The Hindu. May 1, 2010. ISSN 0971-751X.
3. "Using a Not Much-Used Language". shevlinsebastian.blogspot.in. January 19, 2016. Archived from the original on 2016-08-16.
4. "Rites and wrongs". The Hindu. April 30, 2016. Archived from the original on 2021-03-08.
5. "Fight against patriarchy". frontline.in.
6. @frontline_india (September 15, 2016). "G. Prabha's Sanskrit film Ishti pits the feminine spirit against patriarchy" (Tweet) – via Twitter.
7. "IFFI 2016: Sanskrit Film Ishti to Open Indian Panorama Section". News18. October 29, 2016. Archived from the original on 2016-10-31.
8. "Sanskrit Film 'Ishti' to Open Indian Panorama Section of IFFI 2016". India West. Archived from the original on 2017-08-08.
9. "A cultural trip in search of Vedic rituals". The Times of India. Dec 26, 2012. Archived from the original on 2012-12-27.
10. "Know Thyself - Sanskrit feature film Ishti confronts patriarchy in the Namboothiri community of the mid-20th century". The Indian Express. September 21, 2016.
11. "Agnaye". abookoftheday.blogspot.in. 3 February 2014. Archived from the original on 2016-11-04.
12. "Visual poetry". thehindu.com.
13. "കേരളത്തിനു വേണ്ട, ഗോവയിൽ 'ഇഷ്ടി'ക്ക് കൈയടികളോടെ സ്വീകരണം". ManoramaOnline (in Malayalam). 21 November 2016. Archived from the original on 2016-12-02.
14. "Sanskrit film 'Ishti' opens Indian Panorama at IFFI | Video". OnManorama. 22 November 2016. Archived from the original on 2016-11-22.
