= Unnayi Variyar =

17th-century Indian writer and poet

Unnayi Warrier
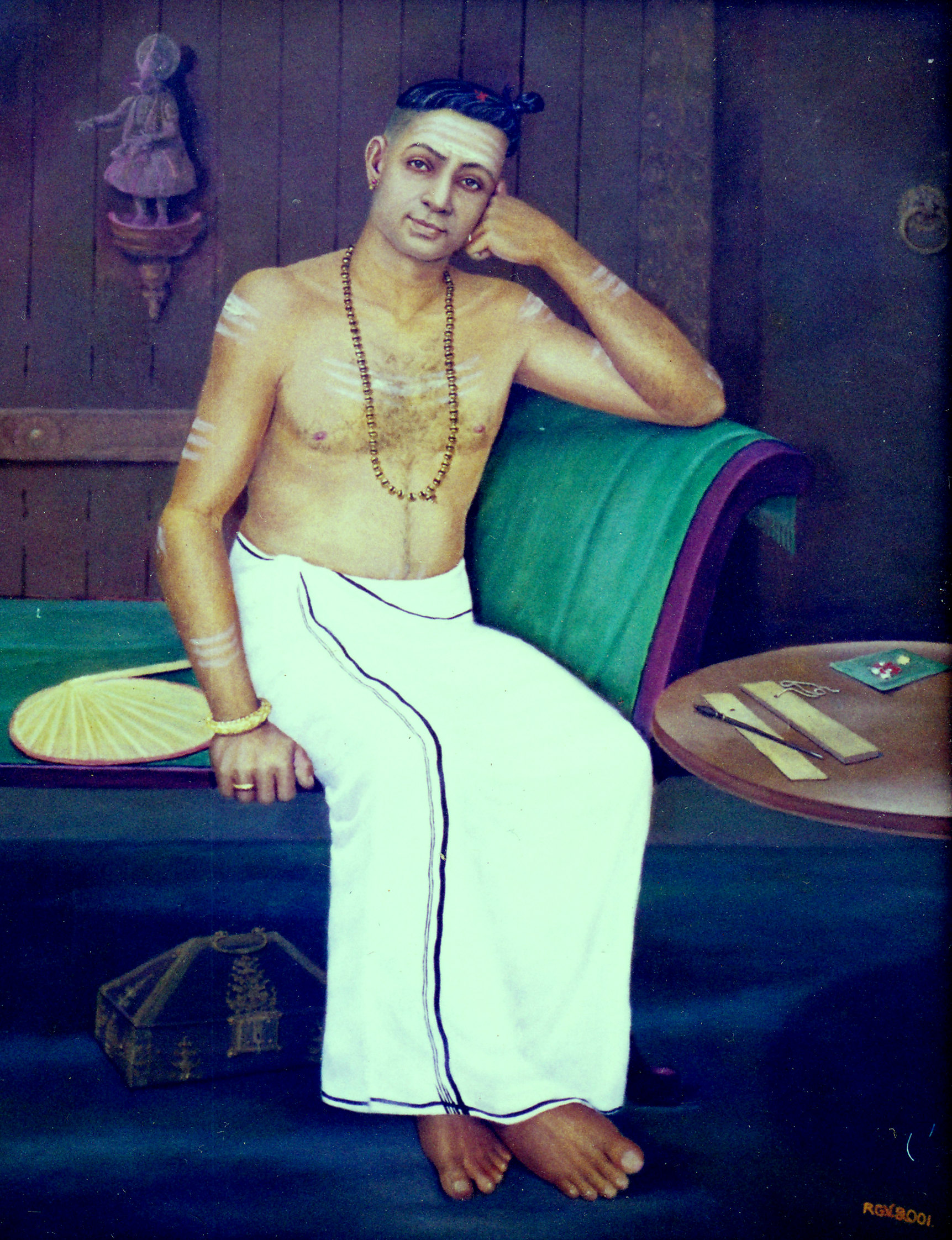
- Born: 17th/18th century CE (estimated); Irinjalakuda, Kerala, India
- Occupations: Poet, writer
- Writing career
- Notable work: Nalacharitham

Unnayi Warrier was a poet, writer, scholar, and dramatist who lived in Thiruvananthapuram, India during the 17th/18th century. He is best known for his chef-d'oeuvre Nalacharitham aattakatha and is known to have made significant contributions to the art of Kathakali, the classical dance-drama form of Kerala.

== Biography ==
There are only limited details available regarding Unnayi Warrier's real name, exact date and place of birth, his family background and literary achievements. There is consensus among scholars that his family name was 'Akathoottu Warriam' and that he was a garland maker (traditional vocation of Warriers (Variar)) by profession at Irinjalakkuda Koodalmanikyam Temple. One tangible record available that throws light on his life and times is that his work Nalacharitham aattakatha - 2nd day was enacted during the festival season of Sree Padmanabhaswamy Temple at Thiruvananthapuram(Trivandrum) in 1749 AD. This indicates that Nalacharitham was authored by Warrier during the first half of 18th century or earlier. There is speculation that Ramapurathu Warrier was a disciple of Unnayi Variyar and as noted by Aimanam Krishna Kaimal in his celebrated work Attakkatha Sahityam, it is reasonable to assume Unnayi Warrier lived between 1674 and 1754 C.E. Kaimal also infers that Unnayi's real name was 'Raman' which he deduced from the last sloka of another of Unnayi's works - Girijakalyanam attakatha mentions the author's name to be 'Raman'.

== Works ==
=== Nalacharitham ===
The most famous work of Unnayi Warrier is Nalacharitham Aattakkatha. The work is divided into four parts/days with each part designed in such a way as to be presented as an independent performance. Nalacharitham elevated the literary standards of Kathakali and is widely recognised to be path breaking and pioneering in its approach to make Kathakali a complete art form. Root story of Nalacharitham Kathakali song is based on the Mahabharata (chapters 52 to 79 of Aaranyaparvam). It is one of the stories told by sage Brihadaswan to Pandava prince Yudhishthira during the despondent times that Pandavas go through during their exile. Story revolves around the most righteous Nishadha king Nala, his wife Damayanti and the troubles they undergo in spite of being pious and virtuous and how in the end they are absolved and restored to their previous glory and joy. By many accounts Nalacharitham is considered to be the complete aattakatha via its perfect storyline, masterly rendering and consistent aesthetics.

=== Other works ===
Besides Nalacharitham, two more works are credited to Warrier. Ramapanchashati is a poem praising Sree Ramam Murthi of Koodalmanikyam Temple comprising 500 slokas in Sanskrit while Girijakalyanam, an essay in three parts based on Mahabharata.

== Influence ==
Fundamental influence that Unnayi Warrier has had on Kathakali is on the emergence of the importance of Rasa (aesthetics) as against a more dominant Bhava Bhava abhinaya. Warrier, through his Nalacharitham, is widely acknowledged to have raised the dramatic value of Kathakali as an art form.

== Unnayi Warrier Smaraka Kalanilayam ==
Unnayi Warrier Smaraka Kalanilayam is an eponymous institute, affiliated to the Government of Kerala, which offers training courses in various performing arts and music.

== Translations ==
- Unnayi Varier's Nalacaritam, translated into English by Sudha Gopalakrishnan, New Delhi, Sahitya Akademi, 2001;
- Jours d'amour et d'épreuve: l'Histoire du roi Nala, translated into French by Dominique Vitalyos, Paris, Gallimard "Connaissance de l'Orient", 1995.
