= Madhurasmitham =

Sanskrit language film

Madhurasmitham is a 2021 children's film about the excellence of government schools and the students who study there. It was the first film directed by Sureshgayathri. Madhurasmitham is the world's first Sanskrit-language children's film. It stars Sanskrit teachers and students.

== Production ==
Madhurasmitham was produced by NK Ramachandran, KE Manoharan, KG Ramabai and BR Lali under the banner of Sanskrit Productions.

== Release ==
Madhurasmitham was screened at the first National Sanskrit Film Festival in Rajasthan.
