= Theruvath Raman =

Theruvath Raman (30 March 1917 – 17 October 2009) was an Indian journalist and writer. He was the founder-editor of the first evening newspaper in Malayalam Pradeepam, published from Kozhikode, Kerala.

== Career ==
Born on 30 March 1917 to Theruvath Kumaran and Kunjamma in Calicut, Raman started his journalist career as the editor of Sahityakahalam weekly. It was during freedom struggle, he founded and published Kahalam weekly. He was arrested and served a six months jail term for publishing an editorial in Kahalam. He had also worked in Prabhatham weekly brought out by former Kerala Chief Minister E. M. S. Namboodiripad. Raman introduced and pioneered the concept of eveninger in Kerala by setting up and publishing Pradeepam newspaper from Kozhikode. He remained its editor more than thirty years.

Theruvath Raman served as a member of International Press Institute and All India Editors Newspaper Conference Standing Committee besides a member of the Press Academy. He had also been the President of Small Newspaper Association, Vice-President of Indian Small and Medium Newspapers Association, and founder president of Senior citizen. He was also a representative in the disarmament congress held in Moscow in 1962 for world peace.

== Awards and books ==
Raman had received many awards including Kesari Award, Giant Outstanding Personality Award and Korean Press Centre award. He is also author of several books including Suprabhatham, Neduveerpp, Jai Hind, Buddha Charitham, Ormayude Nirangal, and Netaji.
