= Kuriyedathu Thatri =

Historical figure from Kerala

Kuriyedathu Thatri or Kuriyedathu Savitri was a Nambuthiri woman from Kerala, India, known for going through the Smarthavicharana (caste-based trial for adultery) in 1905. Often called as Thathri Kutty, her Smarthavicharam is considered as the most controversial one held in Kerala as it shocked the core of the patriarchal and misogynistic society and culture in the state. She is considered by many as one of the earlist feminists from Kerala who fought against the patriarchy that dominated the state. Following the trial of Thathri, a council called Yogakhsemam was formed under the leadership of a few revolutionary Namboothiri men who promoted ideas such as the relaxation of marriage laws and abolishing the practice of Sambandham. Her trial was a turning point in Kerala's history for women and their liberation.

== Early life ==
Thatri was born in Kalpakasseri Illam in Thalapally taluk in what is now inside Thrissur district as the daughter of Ashtamurthy Namboothiri of Kalpakasseri Illam. As per records, she was born in 1885. According to rumours, after her birth, an astrologer told her father that Thatri's birth was “destined to bring calamity and destroy the family's honour“. At the age of 9, Thathri went to her aunt's house near Kunnamkulam to learn singing from a Nambeeshan. Thatri's statement during the trial says that she was sexually harassed there for 12 consecutive days by her relative Musamburi Nampyathan.

== Marriage and aftermath ==
Thathri is said to have married between the ages of 11 and 13 to Raman Namboothiri of Chemmanthite Kuriyedathillam, who was in his early 60s. Raman had multiple wives and regularly hired prostitutes to his house. Later Thathri split from Raman. How she split from her husband is still unclear, but several sources state that Raman abandoned Thathri after she protested his bringing other women and prostitutes into their home. With Raman abandoning her, Thathri started sex work to earn a living.

It is still unclear whether it was Thatri's helplessness or her own choice that made her choose prostitution. Thathri was said to be extremely beautiful and the men who had sex with her came from various castes with some of them being influential in the society. Men who visited her did not know she was an antharjanam (Married namboothiri woman) and these visits were arranged through her servant. It is said that one day her husband had hired Thatri unaware of her identity and when he recognised her, he reported her.

== The trial ==
Smarthavicharam was a notorious ritualistic trial for adultery practiced among the Brahmins of Kerala. If the accused woman was found guilty, she and the men found involved with her (known as jāran) were excommunicated from the caste (Bhraṣṭû) and banished. When Raman Namboothiri reported Thatri's matter in the concerned Namboothiri meeting, an investigation was started against Thatri for infidelity and promiscuity. Some people suggest that it was Thatri's neighbour who reported Thatri's acts in the meeting. By the end of 1904, Tathri's first smarthavicharam was already over. But due to controversies, the King ordered smarthavicharam to be conducted once more. On 13 July 1905, her second trial was conducted. During the trial Thathri admitted to all accusations and in return demanded that the law be administered equally to everyone. Thatri revealed that she was sexually harassed or had mutual consensual sex with 30 Namboodiris, 13 ambalavaasis, 10 Iyers and 11 Nairs. Many of the men Thatri named as sexually abusing her were her close relatives, including her father and his half-brother. The list also included renowned scholars, musicians, and Kathakali artistes ranging from 14 to 85 in age.

Despite many men denying their involvement, Thatri confirmed their identities by recalling the birthmarks and moles on their bodies. She was able to even remember the exact date, time and place when they slept together or when they sexually assaulted her. She also produced various written and visual evidence like letters that were written to her. This trial led to these men losing their credibility in the society. Based on the records, many historians argue that the king had a special interest in Thatri's trial. Bhaskaranunni in his book says that this must be because of an allegation that the king or a close relative of the king was among those who had sex with Tathri. During the seven-month-long trial at three locations under heavy security, each name was called out by Thatri. It is said that when she was about to tell the 65th name, Thatri asked holding up a ring; Do I need to say this name too? The trial was reportedly ended by the King after this incident. Rumour has it that the King abruptly ended the trial because he believed he would be the 65th name to be revealed. Another theory is that when Thathri was about to say the name of the 65th man, families in the nearby villages and families from outside the village, became concerned that she might name someone from their families, and the trial was forced to come to a halt. It is also said that Thatri called out the name of many men during the trial to take revenge against them as they had sexually harassed her during her childhood. For the first time in the history of Smarthavicharam, the accused were also allowed to conduct a cross-examination during the trial of Thatri.

Kavunkal Shankarapanicker, Katalath Madhavan Nair, Panangavil Narayananambiar and Achyutapothuwal, who were famous Kathakali artists of that time, quit their jobs and left their village because of the disgrace of having a clandestine illicit relationship with Thatri.

== Life after the trial ==
After the trial, Thathri was excommunicated along with the 64 men she had named. As per government records, Thathri was sent to Chalakudy and settled in a riverside home. There is no record of her life after that. However there are many popular beliefs. A popular belief is that Thatri converted to Christianity and married a Christian. Pavithran, in his book 'British Commission to India', states that she settled down in Coimbatore after marrying an Anglo-Indian gangman from the Indian Railways. Vasanthi Sankaranarayanan, the translator of the book Outcaste, states that Thathri lived somewhere in Tamil Nadu until the age of 80.

Despite being sexually abused or having had sex with several men, from the time she was 9 to 23, there are no records of Thatri getting pregnant or having an abortion. Some historians believe that after her smarthavicharam and remarriage, she gave birth to two daughters and a son. There have been rumours that a popular Malayalam film actress of the mid-20th century is her granddaughter, a claim which the actress has denied.

== In popular culture ==
The life of Kuriyedathu Thathri has been the subject of several books, documentaries and movies. Thaathreesmarthavicharam: Sampoornna Reghakalum Padanangalum (Thaathreesmarthavicharam, Complete Documents and Studies) is a compilation by Cherai Ramadas of documents and studies related to the trial. In 1969, Madampu Kunjukuttan wrote the Novel Bhrashtu (Outcaste) based on Kuriyedath Thathri and her smarthavicharam. The Malayalam film Parinayam (1994) by Hariharan is loosely based on Smarthavicharam of Kuriyedath Thathri. Taya, the 2021 Sanskrit feature film made by G. Prabha, depicts the life of Thathri from a different perspective.
