= Ishti (film) =

- Directed by: G. Prabha
- Written by: G. Prabha
- Screenplay by: G. Prabha
- Produced by: P.S. Chandu, G. Prabha
- Starring: Nedumudi Venu; Anoop Krishnan; Athira Patel
- Cinematography: Eldho Issac
- Edited by: B. Lenin
- Music by: Kaithapram Damodaran
- Production company: Creative Creations
- Release date: 2016
- Country: India
- Language: Sanskrit

Ishti (or Iṣti:; English: Search for Self) is a 2016 Sanskrit-language film, directed by Dr. G. Prabha, starring Nedumudi Venu and newcomer Athira Patel in lead roles. "Ishti" literally means search for self, yaga, etc. It is the first Sanskrit film with a social theme.

Ishti is written, scripted, produced and directed by Dr. G. Prabha, a Sanskrit professor and a doctorate holder in Sanskrit. Ishti is not the country’s first Sanskrit film. But it certainly is the first one to deal with a social theme. G. Prabha, a doctorate holder in Sanskrit, was the former Head of the Department, Oriental Languages at Loyola College, Chennai. He had earlier made two non-feature films, Agnaye, a documentary film on Athirathram yagna, and Akkitham, on the life of poet Akkitham Achuthan Namboothiri.

Ishti was the opening film, of the feature section of the Indian Panorama section at the 47th edition of IFFI (International Film Festival of India).

Akkitham Achuthan Namboothiri and V Madhusoodhanan Nair penned lyrics for Ishti and the camera was by Eldho P. Issac.

== Plot ==
Ishti is set in mid-twentieth century Kerala when young Namboothiri Brahmins successfully challenged the orthodox, patriarchal traditions of their community which allowed the patriarch, the eldest male member of the family, sole control of family property and denied normal education to its members, particularly women. The film has a feminist angle, too.

Stubborn prejudices behind a veneer of wisdom. Inequities bordering on extreme cruelty. Silent sobs of womanhood in the corridors of traditional mansions. Burning discontent, and some signs of change. Amidst all these, patriarchs who preserve the fire for their own cremation. Ishti recreates the ultra conservative ambience in an evolutionary stage of a community.

Namboothiri Brahmins have made tremendous contributions to life and culture in the South Indian State of Kerala. There have been great writers from among them. Namboothiris have led several progressive movements. But until some seventy five years ago the community lived in a regressive social milieu. Orthodoxy reigned supreme. The eldest son, called Achchan Namboothiri, inherited all the family property. Only he could marry from his community. His younger brothers, called Apan Namboothiris, took their wives generally from ruling families, Nair and Ambalavasi (lower order Brahmins) castes. Children born out of such marriages had no claim to their father's property, and belonged to their mother's caste (Marumakkathayam).

Ramavikraman Namboothiri (Nedumudi Venu), the 71-year-old head of a family, is a Somayaji. That is, he has performed the Somayaga. His ambition is to perform an Athirathram, or the Agniyaga, yaga that will make him an Akkithiri. A Yajamanan preserves the fire from the yaga until he dies in order to use it to light his own funeral pyre. The fire from the yaga would be preserved to light his funeral pyre. He is willing to sell the family silver to achieve his ambition, but is unwilling to part with some money for the treatment of his brother's ailing son, born to a woman from another caste.

Tradition allowed only the eldest brother to marry from within the community and bring home the spouse. It is often polygamous: in many cases elderly men married teenaged girls.

Ramavikraman Namboothiri has three wives. The third one, Sreedevi, is 17, almost the same age as his daughter, Lakshmi. Sreedevi was married for money; the yagas had caused a deep dent on the family's resources. Ramavikraman Namboothiri has also a son by his first wife, 26 year old Raman Namboothiri. He can recite mantras, but is illiterate. He spends much of his time making Kathakali costumes. Ramavikraman Namboothiri's younger brother Narayanan Namboothiri has had an alliance with a Nair woman. The poor soul, unable to pay for his son's medical treatment, can only weep helplessly as the boy dies.

Ramavikraman Namboothiri's third wife, 17-year-old Sridevi, is literate. Sreedevi knows to read and write, and her arrival upsets the conservative set-up. She argues for education beyond the confines of traditional knowledge. She inspires Raman Namboothiri to learn to read and write. This is much more than what the household and the community can tolerate. Conspiracies are soon hatched. An illicit relationship between Sreedevi and Raman Namboothiri is invented. As per custom, elders in the community gather for the trial of the "sinner", Sreedevi, before the inevitable excommunication.

Ramavikraman Namboothiri's eldest son, Raman Namboothiri, can chant Vedic hymns but cannot read or write. He gets convinced by Sridevi's arguments, and this enrages the elders in the community. Soon a conspiracy is hatched against the two, alleging an illicit relationship between them. This is such a serious crime that the woman should be tried and expelled. To Sridevi's shock, her husband supports the conspirators.

Then comes the revolt. Sreedevi, the wounded victim, stands up to her tormentors and speaks for all silent sufferers of her kind. Before the judgment comes she walks out of the darkness. And, the fire Ramavikraman Namboothiri preserves goes out.

== Cast ==
- Nedumudi Venu as Ramavikraman Namboothiri
- Anoop Krishnan as Raman Namboothiri
- Athira Patel as Sreedevi

== Awards ==
- Best Sanskrit Film - 8th Nashik International Film Festival
- Special Mention - 12th International Film Festival of Thrissur (IFFT)
- Award for Best Shooting - 17th Pyongyang International Film Festival, DPR Korea
