= Bhattathiri =

Members of the Namboothiri of Kerala, India

The Bhattathiri are members of the Namboothiri community of Kerala, India. The Namboothiris (Malayalam: നമ്പൂതിരി) are upper class Brahmins in the caste system in India.

== Types ==
The three types of Bhattathiris are Saasthra Bhattathiris, Smaartha Bhattathiris and Bhaagavatha Bhattathiris. These are titles gained due to scholarship.

Historically, Namboothiris have focused on the acquisition and application of knowledge. Saasthra Bhattathiris received the "Bhatta" title after passing examinations on their scholarship. All Saasthra Namboothiris are from Aadu or Edu class, the elite Namboothiris.

The Smaartha Bhattathiris specialized in conducting trials of Namboothiris. Judgements would be pronounced based on their findings. This trial process was called Jaathi Saasyam or Smaartha Vichaaram, and the expert conducting it was called Smaarthan or Smaartha Bhattathiri, with the term Bhattathiri meaning "expert".

Bhaagavatha Bhattathiris specialize in the recitation of puraanams (epics). Namboothiri families of various classes were Bhaagavatha Bhattathiris.
