= Marthandavarma (novel) =

1891 historical novel by C. V. Raman Pillai

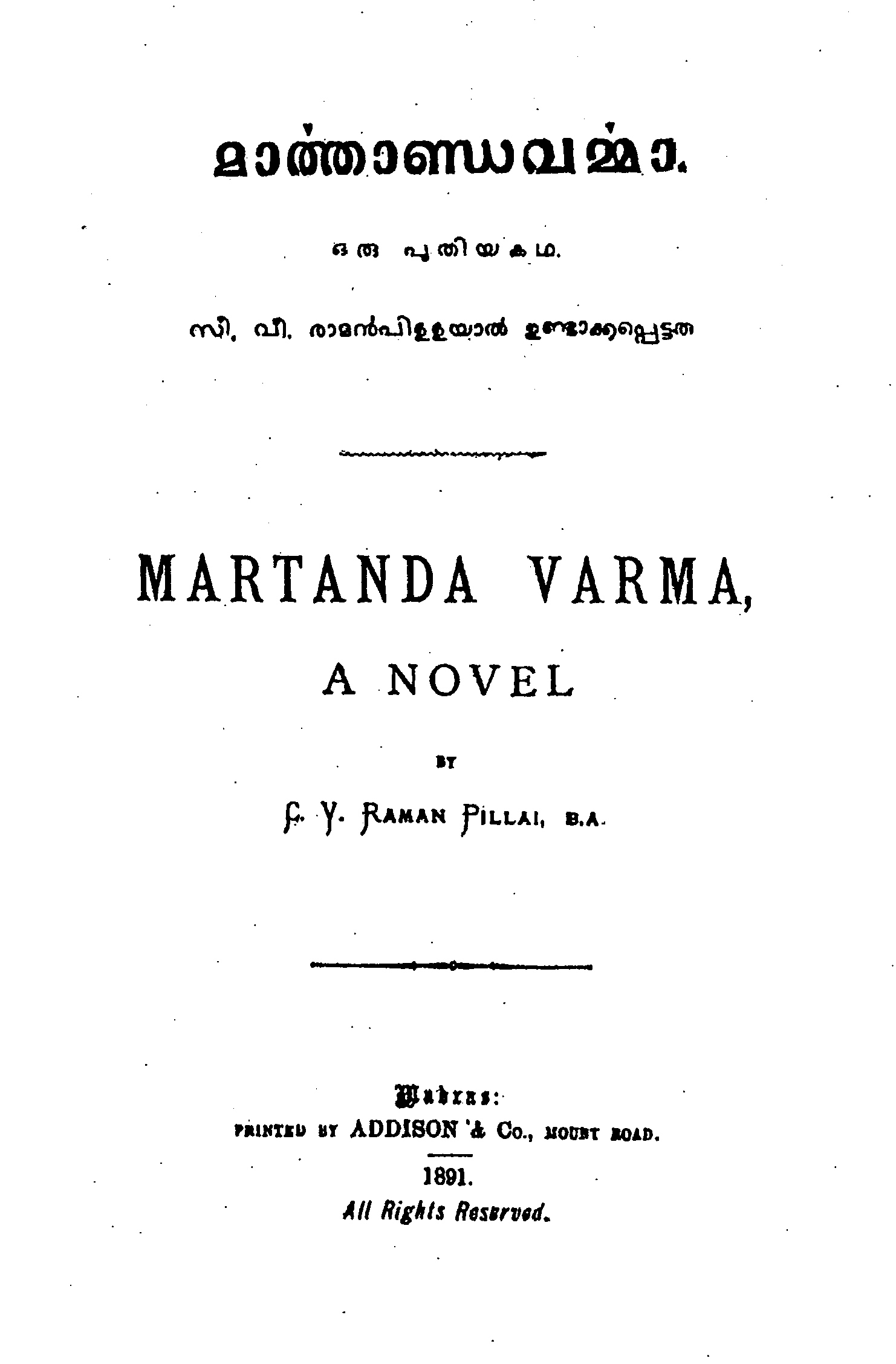
- Title page of the first edition
- Author: C.V. Raman Pillai
- Original title: മാർത്താണ്ഡവർമ്മ
- Translator: B. K. Menon (1936 – English); O. Krishna Pillai (1954 – Tamil); R. Leela Devi (1979 – English); Kunnukuzhy Krishnankutty (1990 – Hindi); P. Padmanabhan Thambi (2007 – Tamil); G.S. Iyer (2024 – English)
- Language: Malayalam
- Genre: Historical Novel; Historical Romance
- Set in: Travancore (1727 – 1732)
- Published: Malayalam : 11 June 1891 (Author) 1911 – 1925 (B. V. Book Depot) 1931 – 1971 (Kamalalaya Book Depot) 1973 onwards (Sahithya Pravarthaka Co-operative Society) 1983 onwards (Poorna Publications) 1992 onwards (D. C. Books) 1999 (Kerala Sahitya Akademi) English : 1936 (Kamalalaya Book Depot) 1979 (Sterling Publishers) 1998 (Sahitya Akademi) 2024 (Eka) Tamil : 1954 (Kamalalaya Book Depot) 2007 (Sahitya Akademi) Hindi : 1990 (Kerala Hindi Prachar Sabha)
- Publication place: India
- Media type: Print (Paperback)
- ISBN: 8171301304 (D. C. Books ed.)
- Followed by: Dharmaraja, Ramarajabahadur
- Original text: മാർത്താണ്ഡവർമ്മ at Malayalam Wikisource

Marthandavarma (Malayalam: മാർത്താണ്ഡവർമ്മ, Māṟttāṇḍavaṟmma [mɑːṟt̪t̪ɑːɳɖaʋaṟmma]) is a historical romance novel by C. V. Raman Pillai published in 1891. Taking place between 1727 and 1732 (Kollavarsham 901–906), the story follows three protagonists (Ananthapadmanabhan, Subhadra, and Mangoikkal Kuruppu) as they try to protect Marthanda Varma's position as the heir to the throne of Venad from Padmanabhan Thambi (the son of Rajah Rama Varma) and the Ettu Veetil Pillamar, both of whom want to oust him from the throne. The novel includes allusions to the Indian subcontinent and Western, historical, cultural and literary traditions.

The historical plot runs alongside the love story of Ananthapadmanabhan and Parukutty, Ananthapadmanabhan's chivalric actions, Parukutty's longing for her lover, and Zulaikha's unrequited love. The politics of Venad is shown through the council of Ettuveettil Pillas, the subsequent claim of the throne by Padmanabhan Thambi, the coup attempt, the patriotic conduct of Subhadra, and finally to her tragedy following the suppression of the revolt. The intertwined representation of history and romance is attained through classic style of narration, which includes vernacular languages for various characters, rhetorical embellishments, and a blend of dramatic and archaic style of language suitable to the historical setting of the novel.

This novel is the first historical novel published in Malayalam language and in south India. The first edition, self published by the author in 1891, received positive to mixed reviews, but book sales did not produce significant revenue. The revised edition, published in 1911, was an enormous success and became a bestseller. The story of Travancore is continued in the later novels, Dharmaraja (1913) and Ramarajabahadur (1918–1919). These three novels are together known as CV's Historical Narratives and C. V. Raman Pillai's Novel Trilogy in Malayalam literature.

The 1933 movie adaptation Marthanda Varma led to a legal dispute with the novel's publishers and became the first literary work in Malayalam to be the subject of a copyright infringement. The novel has been translated into English, Tamil, and Hindi, and has also been abridged and adapted in a number of formats, including theater, radio, television, and comic book. The Marthandavarma has been included in the curriculum for courses offered by universities in Kerala and Tamil Nadu, as well as the curriculum of the Kerala State Education Board.

== Historical background and context ==
The Venad kingdom under Ravi Varma with Nair feudal lord Administrative system (Kollavarsham 859–893, Gregorian Calendar: 1684–1718), they had to resist foreign attacks and make the eventual payments of arrears to Madurai Nayaks; which resulted in the imposition of fresh taxes to meet the expenses. Ravi Varma was succeeded by Aditya Varma (Kollavarsham 893–894, Gregorian Calendar:1718), and during his reign, resolutions were made by the local bodies in villages not to pay the taxes. Unni Kerala Varma succeeded to the throne, and during his reign, the feudal chieftains became more powerful as the King was weak in disposition. The forces once organized by Kerala Varma were disbanded and some of them took services under the feudal lords. Unni Kerala Varma was succeeded by Rama Varma in Kollavarsham 899 (Gregorian Calendar: 1724); during his reign the feudal lords grew stronger. Rama Varma, pleased with the energy and intelligence of the then prince Marthanda Varma, allowed him to take necessary actions in the affairs of government; which the prince utilized to adopt measures against the rebellious feudal lords, who in-turn became his inveterate enemies and planned lethal actions against the prince. Marthanda Varma suggested to the King to obtain aid from foreign forces against the power of the feudal lords, and Rama Varma made a treaty with Madurai Nayaks at Tiruchirappalli in Kollavarsham 901 (Gregorian Calendar 1726) to have additional forces be supplied to Venad for an annual payment.

=== Context ===
The Travancore royal family follows Marumakkathayam as the rule of succession, which is collateral descent through maternal nephews. The feudatory chiefs persuaded the sons of King Rama Varma, Pappu Thambi and Raman Thambi to claim their father's throne through Makkathayam, which is lineal descent through sons, while Marthanda Varma was the legal heir. The novel opens in Kollavarsham 901, when feudatory chiefs are taking lethal actions against prince Marthanda Varma, while King Rama Varma headed to Tiruchirappalli for the treaty with Nayaks. The plot moves two years ahead during when the payment to Madurai forces became arrears, the King become ill and bed ridden, feudatory chiefs and sons of Rama Varma joined hands in conspiring against the prince. The novel narrates how Marthanda Varma ascended to the throne overcoming hurdles with the help of his well wishers and the entanglements of their personal lives with the history of Travancore (Venad).

== Title ==
The novel released with the title scripted as മാൎത്താണ്ഡവൎമ്മാ in Malayalam, for which the Latin equivalent is Māṟttāṇḍavaṟmmā. Though the original title is a single word, the English counterpart was scripted as Martanda Varma with a space between Martanda and Varma akin to the scripting of the title in Tamil as மார்த்தாண்ட வர்மா. The title was later changed to മാൎത്താണ്ഡവൎമ്മ in the editions published by Kamalalaya Book Depot by omitting the long Monophthong vowel sign ാ (ā) in the end, though English counterpart was kept unchanged in the regular editions, the abridged edition corrected it to Marthandavarma, which was followed in the editions and reprints after the copyright period. The title was further revised post the centenary of the novel as മാർത്താണ്ഡവർമ്മ, replacing the Dot reph, ൎ with Chillu, ർ inline with the contemporary Malayalam script usage.

== Plot summary ==
In Panchavan forest, a group of merchants find a young man, Ananthapadmanabhan, unconscious and covered in blood and take him with them. Two years later, Parukutty still refuses to believe that her missing lover, Ananthapadmanabhan, is dead. Her mother arranges for her to marry Padmanabhan Thambi, elder son of aging King Rama Varma, through Thambi's right hand, Sundarayyan. The king has fallen ill and is confined to his bed. Desiring the throne, Thambi and Sundarayyan, spreads the lie that the rightful heir, Prince Marthanda Varma, planned the attack on Ananthapadmanabhan because of an argument over a prostitute. Thambi allies himself with the Ettuveettil Pillas to oust the prince, stirring up the people against him and the royal officials. Some citizens stop paying taxes and the forces and finances of the royals are diminished.

Prince Marthanda Varma and his aide, Parameswaran Pilla, stay at Charottu palace while on way to Bhoothapandi, to have discussions with Madurai forces, who detained the prime minister, Arumukham Pilla after payment for the forces become arrears. Velu Kuruppu, a loyalist fighter who serves Padmanabhan Thambi, with his lancers chase out the prince and his aide, however the chased-duo evade chasers after being aided by a mad Channan who misdirect the pursuers, who in-turn fight with mad Channan, Ananthapadmanabhan in disguise. Velu Kuruppu and his team run away after Channan was helped by the archer Chulliyil Chadachi Marthandan Pilla, who also kills a few of the lancers as a payback to Channan for saving his life earlier. The prince and his aide take refuge at Mangoikkal Kuruppu's house. Following Thambi's order to capture the Channan-people, the mad Channan is captured and locked in the dungeon. Upon discovering that Marthanda Varma is at Mangoikkal's house, Velu Kuruppu sends his men to the house and rushes back to Thambi to arrange for more lancers and Nair soldiers to finish off the prince. The mad Channan finds an underground passage from the dungeon to Charottu palace rushes to the Channan-people. As the prince and Mangoikkal arrange for additional forces, Velu Kuruppu and his men launch an attack on Mangoikkal and set the house on fire. The mad Channan and the Channan-people reach Mangoikkal's house to fight the attackers, and Channan rescues prince and his aide trapped in house on fire. Fighters from Mangoikkal's martial arts school join the fight and defeat Velu Kuruppu's men. That night, Thirumukhathu Pilla visits Thambi to ask about the murder of his son, Ananthapadmanabhan; during when one of Velu Kuruppu's lancers arrives and recounts the defeat at Mangoikkal's.

Marthanda Varma returns to his Thiruvananthapuram home. Thambi and Sundarayyan arrive to stay at Chembakassery. At night, Ananthapadmanabhan, disguised as a citizen of Kasi (Kasivasi) enters Chembakassery by drugging the caretaker of the armory, Shanku Assan. Thambi, overwhelmed by Parukutty's beauty, goes to her room to attain her but is dragged out by Kasivasi. Half asleep, Parukutty is disturbed by glimpses of the scuffle and falls ill. Later, Sundarayyan steals ornaments from the house. Thambi and his team leave the next morning.

Kazhakkoottathu Pilla comes to inquire into Parukutty's illness. He is then followed by Ananthapadmanabhan, disguised as a beggar, to Kudamon Pilla's house. At Kudamon's house a council is formed by the Ettuveettil Pillas and Sundarayyan in support of Padmanabhan Thambi as the next king. Kazhakkoottathu Pilla voices his dissatisfaction with the situation but assures his support. He leaves the council, followed by the beggar. Kazhakkoottathu meets Mangoikkal on the way. The beggar returns to the council to hear the final decision. The council decides to assassinate Prince Marthanda Varma. Afterwards, Ramanamadathil Pilla meets Subhadra, the granddaughter of Kudamon Pilla's maternal aunt. Kazhakkoottathu tricks Mangoikkal and abducts him. As Sundarayyan is returning from the council, he is confronted by the beggar who tries to snatch the council note from him. Struggling, they both fall into the Killiyar. The beggar rescues Sundarayyan, who cannot swim. Sundarayyan awakes on the shore and delivers the council decision to Thambi.

Learning of Parukutty's illness, Subhadra goes to console her mother and learns about Thambi's stay and the theft at the house. At the royal palace a message arrives from Pathan camp warning of the council at Kudamon Pilla's house, as the resolution is unknown, the prince should stay alert at all times. The message also announces the arrival of Mangoikkal. Ramayyan recommends strict action against the conspirators but the prince disagrees. During the discussion the prince realizes that Kalakkutty, whom he had sent to deliver a request for help to Thirumakhathu Pilla, is the maternal uncle-in-law of Sundarayyan; also concludes that Ettuveettil Pillas may have harmed Mangoikkal.

Subhadra arrives at Thambi's house by night and asks him about his actions at Chembakassery. During the conversation Thambi realizes that Subhadra knows that the murder that he and Sundarayyan are trying to blame on the prince, was committed by Velu Kuruppu. Thambi goes to stab her with his dagger but, seeing her unmoved, he shrinks back. When Subhadra leaves, Thambi and Sundarayyan decide to kill her, as she knows their secret. Sundarayyan buys poison at Pathan camp but Ananthapadmanabhan, disguised as Shamsudeen, sells him a harmless colored powder. Subhadra persuades Shanku Assan to tell her if the Kasivasi who entered Chambakassery the other night is still at Pathan camp. On his return from Pathan camp, Assan tells her that Sundarayyan was there buying poison. At Pathan camp, Hakkim warns Shamsudeen to be careful of danger when searching for Mangoikkal. Subhadra realizes that Sundarayyan plans to poison her and returns home. The prince and his aide, disguised as civilians, go with Ramayyan to look for Mangoikkal.

At night, Ramayyan goes to Sree Pandarathu house, home of Kazhakkoottathu, searching for Mangoikkal. The prince and his aide, sheltered behind a tree, notice an unidentifiable figure (Velu Kuruppu) pass by in a westerly direction. Later, the prince witnesses Sundarayyan heading to his wife, Anantham's, house. Subhadra is with Ramanamadathil Pilla, who leaves after assuring her that he will return. As Ramanamadathil passes by, the prince overhears him talking to himself about the greatness of Kazhakkoottathu Pilla, who captured Mangoikkal. Ramayyan returns to the prince and tells him that he could not check at Sree Panadarathu house due to additional security forces stationed there. Velu Kuruppu arrives at Thambi's house. The prince and his aides leave to check on the ailing king. The archer, Chulliyil Chadachi Marthandan Pilla, chases after them, shooting arrows. The arrows are struck down by the mad Channan who then beats down the archer. Anantham brings food, that her husband secretly poisoned, to Subhadra. Subhadra realizes that the stolen ornaments are at Anantham's house and that she is unaware of her husband's plans. The mad Channan, hiding nearby, overhears their conversation. Ramanamadathil, Sundarayyan and Chulliyil Chadachi Marthandan Pilla visit Thambi's house to talk about assassinating the prince. When Ramanamadathil returns, Subhadra realizes the plan to assassinate the prince by Velu Kuruppu. She sends Shankarachar to deliver a note to the prince. At the king's palace, the prince is relieved to find that the king is a bit better after receiving medicine. Velu Kuruppu attempts to stab the prince while he is returning to his palace with his aide. Shankarachar stops him, they fight and Velu Kuruppu stabs Shankarachar then runs away. The prince and his aide reach Shankarachar, who manages to deliver the note before his final breath. Velu Kuruppu reaches Thambi, who summons Ramanamadathil, Chulliyil Chadachi Marthandan Pilla, Sundarayyan and Kodanki. They decide to move Mangoikkal from Sree Pandarathu house to Chembakassery.

Meanwhile, the mad Channan goes to Sree Pandarathu house, drugs the guards and gets the keys. He finds Mangoikkal in the dungeon but Ramanamadathil and company arrive and cut off their escape. In turn, Velu Kuruppu then Kondanki approach the Channan and are shot dead by his pistol. Channan agrees to be in detention with Mangoikkal Kuruppu on the condition that he be allowed to keep his weapons, after Ramanamadathil informs that detainees will be prosecuted by Thirumikhathu Pilla. Mangoikkal and the Channan are moved to Chembakassery and are watched over by palace guards who are loyal to Thambi. Sundarayyan and others spread the lie that prince Marthanda Varma tried to assassinate Ramanamadathil and is responsible for the night's murders.

Subhadra gets some relief when her servant returns from Pathan camp with medicine for Parukutty. He also tells her that one of the men at the camp resembles her ex-spouse. An angry mob of citizens rush the palace, but are turned back by the ailing king who signals for them to leave. Ramanamadathil arrives at Thambi's house to tell about the revolt at the palace and praises the actions of Sundarayyan. Chulliyil Chadachi Marthandan Pilla and a servant arrive and announce the death of King Rama Varma. After Rama Varma's funeral, Marthanda Varma manages to send the required payment to the forces from Madurai. Subhadra reaches Chembakassery with medicine for Parukutty, who immediately begins to recover from her illness. Subhadra stays at Chembakassery for the next five days.

The prince discovers that the men sent from Kilimanoor, led by Narayanayyan, have been defeated by Kazhakkoottathu Pilla and his men. He fires the palace guards who are working for Thambi. Subhadra returns home after learning of the council being held at her house by Thambi and team. Parukutty and her mother get the keys from caretaker to release the two men from detention. Upon release, the mad Channan runs ahead to conceal his identity and is followed by Mangoikkal. Parukutty sees his resembles to her missing lover and realizes that he is the one who fought off Thambi the night he tried to attain her. Ettuveettil Pillas, the Thambi brothers and Sundarayyan decide to assassinate the prince at the palace that night. Mangoikkal's nephews arrive at the palace to support the prince. He tells them to come in the morning and coordinate with Ramayyan. Later, the prince is awakened from his sleep by Subhadra's arrival in his room, informing him his life is in danger. The prince follows her after remembering that she was the one who helped him another night. Kudamon Pilla, Padmanabhan Thambi and company enter the palace to assassinate the prince but find no one. Subhadra heads to her house with Marthanada Varma, Parameswaran and Ramayyan who are disguised as menials. They are spotted by Raman Thambi and his team on the way, but she and the trio evade him due to her quick thinking. The trio hide near a banyan tree while Subhadra fetches five men, dressed as porters, from her home and rejoins them. She instructs them to cross Venganoor. They are about to leave when Thirumukhathu Pilla arrives and recognizes the prince. He asks Subhadra why she is helping the one who killed her brother, Ananthapadmanabhan. She assures him that Ananthapadmanabhan is not dead and asks how he could be her brother. Thirumukhathu reveals that he is her father. Subhadra says that her brother will be at Pathan camp.

Subhadra goes home and the others head east as Thirumukhathu knows that Aruveettukar are waiting near the west banks of the river, Karamana. Unable to find the prince, Thambi and the Ettuveettil Pillas lead their forces to Manakkadu, to attack Magaoikkal's fighters. Tipped off by Subhadra, Mangoikkal's fighters are able to put up a stiff resistance despite being outnumbered. Pathan fighters led by Shamsudeen and Beeram Khan arrive and assist against Thambi's forces. Beeram Khan fights Sundarayyan who he has a personal grudge against for causing his separation from, his then-spouse, Subhadra. Sundarayyan brings down Beeram Khan's horse, trapping the latter under the horse. Sundarayyan advances towards him but Beeram Khan springs out from under the body, kills his opponent and leaves the battlefield at once. Shamsudeen shoots Thambi in the hand as he is about to kill Nuradeen. Before Ramanamadathil Pilla and Raman Thambi can advance towards Shamsudden the battlefield is surrounded by Thirumukhathu Pilla and Prince Marthanda Varma's forces. The Thambi brothers and the Ettuveettil Pillas are arrested.

The next day, the prince conducts post funerary rituals for the king. He brings back his nephew, the little prince, and aunt, who were safeguarded by Keralavarma Koithampuran at Chembakassery. There, a joyful Parakutty awaits her lover Ananthapadmanabhan's return from the Pathan camp. A few days later, Marthanda Varma ascends the throne. The king orders Ananthapadmanabhan to move Subhadra from her house to safeguard her from Kudamon Pilla, who the king has just released. Subhadra is at her house and sad due to the revelation about her ex-spouse. Kudamon Pilla arrives, catches her by the hair and is about to plunge his sword but Beeram Khan rushes in crying not to kill her. On hearing the voice of her ex-spouse and seeing him longing for her, she thanks god that she can even die. The sword falls on her neck. Before Kudamon Pilla can slay Beeram Khan, he is cut into two by Ananthapadmanabhan who has just arrived. On hearing the news, Marthanda Varma swears under his breath that he will seek vengeance on those responsible for the un-warranted shedding of blood.

Three years later, Mangoikkal's house has been rebuilt. Ananthapadmanabhan heads Marthanda Varma's forces in battles with Desinganadu and other kingdoms. He stays at Chembakassery with his family. Marthanda Varma earns fame as a protector of the people as well as a servant to Sreepadmanabha deity. The people celebrate.

== Characters ==
=== Character relations ===
Character relationships
style="border-spacing: 4px; border: 0px solid darkgray;"

Legend

descent	adoption	spouse relation	CA	CB	CA loves CB, Unrequited	spouse relation, separated

UW	Unnamed Woman	UM	Unnamed Man	UHH	Unnamed House-holder	UL	Unnamed Lady	UN	Unnamed Nair

style="border-spacing: 4px; border: 0px solid darkgray; text-align: left; line-height: 90%; stroke: red;"

<Family Name / Type>	Matrilineal family
<Family Name / Type>	Patrilineal family
<Family Name / Type>	Family of lineage unknown
<Character>	Character gets killed during the time-line of novel
<Character>	Active character during the timeline of novel

style="border-spacing: 4px; border: 0px solid darkgray; text-align: left; line-height: 90%;"

Pathan	Nair	Kudamon	Thirumukhathu	Unspecified	Chembakasserry	Kazhakkoottam
UW	UW
Hakkim	UHH	UW	UW	Kudamon Pilla	UW	Thirumukhathu Pilla	UW
UM	Ayisha	Chembakassery Mootha Pilla	Karthyayani Amma	Ugran Kazhakoottathu Pilla
UN / Beeram Khan	Subhadra	UW
Fathima	UL
Zulaikha	Ananthapadmanabhan	Parukutty	Thevan Vikraman
Nuradeen	UL

== Development ==
=== Background and composition ===
C. V. Raman Pillai was introduced to historical fiction through the works of Sir Walter Scott and Alexandre Dumas during his days at Maharaja's College, Thiruvananthapuram. After graduating in 1881, Pillai traveled to the southern provinces of Travancore with his friend P. Thanu Pillai, then the Tahsildar at Agastheeswaram, and became acquainted with the regional legends that he later incorporated into his novels.

Before starting to write Marthandavarma, Pillai would read English novels and take notes. While writing Marthandavarma, Pillai had difficulty sleeping and his constant betel chewing instigated his writing. During the composition, Pillai's spouse and Mukkalampattu Janaki Amma were amanuenses, whenever one of them was free. However, the author's neighbor, Ms. Thazhamadathu Janaki Amma, actually transcribed more of the book than either of them. Pillai went to Madras to pursue his law examination.

In January 1890, the Malayalam novel Indulekha was released and became a topic of discussion in Madras. The instant fame of Indulekha and its author, O. Chandumenon, incited C. V. Raman Pillai to complete his novel Marthandavarma. N. Balakrishnan Nair recounts that a challenge was raised by some Malabarians as to whether there were any men in Travancore who could create another literary work like Indulekha, to which C. V. Raman Pillai reciprocated that he will prove it as affirmative. For almost two months after that, the author was occupied in writing Marthandavarma. C. V. Raman Pillai, while involved in the discussions of memorandum, mentioned to G. Parameswaran Pillai that with the publication of his novel, Marthandavarma, people would be proud about their early history. Eventually, he lost interest in passing his law examinations, as his main intention was to complete Marthandavarma and ready the manuscript for printing. C. V. Raman Pillai left for Trivandrum after he was entrusted to translate the memorandum to Malayalam. According to N. Balakrishnan Nair, the author rejoined in his job on Ciṅṅaṁ 9, 1066 (23 August 1890).

C. V. Raman Pillai sent the completed chapters to his friend N. Raman Pillai (Note: N. Raman Pillai (1864–?), the eldest among the sons of Dewan Nanoo Pillay, studied at Maharaja's College Trivandrum in 1882, during when he was expelled from Travancore along with G. Parameswaran Pillai and R. Ranga Rao (son of R. Raghunatha Rao), after alleged to be behind an article against the then Dewan Rama Iyengar, later completed B. A. from Madras Christian College; during when, he made his contributions to the manuscripts of Marthandavarma before passing those to the printers, Messrs. Addison & Co.) at Madras, who in turn edited and contributed to the manuscript. The author's earlier experiences of having estranged from home, his life with Muslims at Hyderabad, having suggested converting to Islam and marry a Muslim girl were adapted to build the characterization of Shamsudeen and the descriptions of Pathan camp in the novel. The character of Karthyayani Amma is based on his elder sister, and the attire of Velu Kuruppu is based on the outlook of K. C. Kesava Pillai.

==== Controversy over the period ====
According to P. K. Parameswaran Nair, consensus is the novel was developed during 1890, though he claimed that the author wrote it between 1883 and 1885, which contradicts his own statement that C. V. Raman Pillai thought about writing a novel only at the age of twenty-eight years, which is around 1887. P. Venugopalan affirms that there is an earlier version of the novel, and that N. Raman Pillai listened to a reading of an early draft while at Madras. The affirmation about the inclusion of Subhadra in the earlier version of novel brought out another contradiction to the claim of P. K. Parameswaran Nair with his own quotes from the words of C. V. Raman Pillai, which state that the author envisioned the character of Subhadra through his wife, Bhageeridhi Amma, whom he married only in November 1887. One of Pillai's later amanuenses, K. R. Prameswaran Pilla, quoted the author as saying that he started writing Marthandavarma while staying in Madras. N. Balakrishanan Nair notes that, Pillai made several visits to Madras with the particulars from N. Raman Pillai's home, while G. Parameswaran Pillai and the latter were in Madras. George Irumbayam asked P. K. Parameswaran Nair about the existence of such a letter; who said that he had lost it. The claim of P. K. Parameswaran Nair and those who supported the same were concluded as attempts of fans of C. V. Raman Pillai, whom they wanted to cast as the first novelist of Malayalam literature, and George Irumbayam remarked that the fans went to the extent of not believing the words of the writer in the deliberation of their attempt.

=== Printing ===
P. K. Parameswaran Nair states that the proceedings with printers at Madras were initiated after the completion of novel writing, which contradicts his own statement about the completion of printing till 150 pages while quoting a letter from N. Raman Pillai, whose words indicate that the scripting was in progress. K. R. Parameswaran Pilla notes that the printing of the novel was started after the completion of third chapter. The printing was done at Messrs. Addison & Co., Madras, to whom the manuscripts were passed over by N. Raman Pillai. N. Balakrishnan Nair points that C. V. Raman Pillai went to hometown from Madras to arrange the money for printing, and during the time, he sent the manuscripts to N. Raman Pillai.

C. V. Raman Pillai was involved in the Malayalam translation of memorandum proposed by G. Prameswaran Pillai titled then as Malayāḷi Memorial followed by the printing and getting the signatures from supporters, and being involved in the activities, he fell short of money as some promised sponsors pulled out fearing an adverse reaction from Government. K. P. Sankara Menon and G. Parameswaran Pillai came to Trivandrum by the end of December 1890 for campaigning about the memorandum. C. V. Raman Pillai bore the expenses of their commutations and proceedings, and went on to sell his wife's necklace to meet the requirements. The memorandum was eventually sent to the king on 10 January 1891 by K. P. Sankara Menon.

The financial crunch due to the situations made it difficult for C. V. Raman Pillai to pay for complete the printing of the remaining chapters as intended; so, he made a concise version and had it printed as part of twenty-sixth chapter, which thus became the final chapter of the novel. P. K. Parameswaran Nair states that there were three more chapters after the twenty-sixth chapter by referring to a letter from N. Raman Pillai, who learned of the concise narration only after getting the printed copy as he had gone to Thiruvananthapuram before the completion of printing, criticized the author regarding the same. According to N. Balakrishnan Nair, the concise version included in twenty-sixth chapter is an abridgement of two intended chapters. C. V. Raman Pillai states in the preamble that he wanted to have an annexure at the end of the novel.

== Publication ==
=== Release ===
When printing of further copies with errata was over, C. V. Raman Pillai made a request for permission on 13 April 1891 to submit the first copy at royal palace, and subsequently the book was released on 11 June 1891 after presenting the first copy to Aswathi Thirunal Marthanda Varma, to whom the book is also dedicated to. Pillai sent two copies to Kerala Varma Valiya Koil Thampuran, one for the recipient and another for recipient's wife, which was acknowledged in the recipient's letter to the author dated 24 June 1891. N. Balakrishnan Nair states that author gave several copies of book as complimentary ones, out of the total 1000 copies printed. According to P. K. Parameswaran Nair, the publication of Marthandavarma was a great event in the history of Malayalam literature. The novel was the first of its kind in Malayalam literature, the release of the novel made Malayalam the sixth (Note: 1. Bengali: অঙ্গুরীয় বিনিময়, anguriyô binimôy (1862, Anguriya Binimaya by Bhudev Mukhopadhyay) or দুর্গেশনন্দিনী, durgeshnôndini (1865, Durgeshnandini by Bankim Chandra Chattopadhyay), 2. Gujarati: કરણ ઘેલો, karaṇ ghēlō (1866, Karan Ghelo by Nandshankar Tuljashankar Mehta), 3. Marathi: मोचनगड, mōcanagaḍ (1871, Mochanagad by Ramchandra Bhikaji Gunjikar), 4. Odia: ପଦ୍ମମାଲୀ, padmamāḷī (1888, Padmamali by Umesh Chandra Sarkar), 5. Urdu: ملک العزیز ورجنا, malikuʹl-ʻazīz varjinā, (1888, ملک [عبد] العزیز ورجنا, Malik-ul-Aziz Varjina by Abdul Halim Sharar), 6. Malayalam: മാർത്താണ്ഡവർമ്മാ, māṟttāṇḍavaṟmmā (1891, Marthandavarma).) Indian language and first Dravidian language to have a novel in the genre of historical fiction, thus became the first (Note: 1. 1891–Marthandavarma (Malayalam: മാൎത്താണ്ഡവൎമ്മാ, māṟttāṇḍavaṟmmā) 2. 1892–Suryakantha (Kannada: ಸೂರ್ಯಕಾಂತಾ, sūryakāṁtā) by Lakshman Gadagkar, 3. 1895–Mohanangi (Tamil: மோகனாங்கி, mōkaṉāṅki) by T. T. Saravanamuthu Pillai, 4. 1896–Hemalata (Telugu: హేమలత, hēmalata) by Chilakamarti Lakshmi Narasimham.) historical novel of South India.

=== Revised edition ===
In 1911, Kulakkunnathu Raman Menon, (Note: Kulakkunnathu S. Raman Menon (1877–1925), who hails from Mayannur near Ottapalam was a school teacher at Trivandrum, where he established the publishing house BāṣābhiVaṟdhini Book Depot alias B. V. Book Depot in 1902 for the printing of academic books, later started Kamalalaya Printing Press in 1918, and known as B. V. Book Depot and Kamalalaya Printing Works to become the leading book publisher and printer in Travancore, and published the works of C. V. Raman Pillai, after acquiring the copyrights.) who owned B. V. Book Depot at Trivandrum, acquired rights of the novel, to publish from his own publishing house. C. V. Raman Pillai did a revision for the new edition, in which he had replaced the edits of N. Raman Pillai in the first edition with his own. The author corrected the flaws in the usages of Sanskrit and Malayalam words, together with the change of phrases that are in line with the then usages of Malayalam. The changes included the removal of a precognitive narration about the death of Padmanabhan Thambi at Nagercoil, removal of reference to an earlier spouse of character Anantham prior to her relationship with Sundarayyan and removal of references to mistresses from Thanjavur. The copyrights of the novel were registered on 11 August 1911, and D. C. Kizhakemuri notes that the copyrights were reserved until 31 December 1972.

All the reprints of the novel available after 1911 are only of the revised edition. Sahithya Pravarthaka Co-operative Society (SPCS) alias Sahithya Pravarthaka Shakarana Sangham of Kottayam, Poorna Publications of Kozhikode, and D. C. Books of Kottayam started publishing their editions from 1973, 1983, and 1992 respectively to remain as the major publishers (Note: The Little Prince Publications, Kerala Sahitya Akademi, Rachana Books, Chintha Publishers, and Lal Books released their editions in 1983, 1999, 2009, 2010, and 2016 respectively.) of the novel.

=== Translations ===
Marthandavarma has been translated into three languages, Tamil, English and Hindi as six different versions, among which three were in English, two were in Tamil, and one incomplete translation was in Hindi.

- 1936: Marthanda Varma (English) – The first English translation by B. K. Menon (Note: B. K. Menon (1907–1950) was a writer in Malayalam and English who did the first English translation of Marthandavarma novel, due to the persuation of his friend P. Narayanan Nair, the then manager of Kamalalaya Printing Works.) was published by Kamalalaya Book Depot, Trivandrum in 1936, and was republished by Sahitya Akademi in 1998 after a revision by the daughter of B. K. Menon, Prema Jayakumar.
- 1954: மார்த்தாண்ட வர்மா (Mārttāṇḍa Varmā, Tamil) – The first translation of the novel in Tamil was by O. Krishna Pillai. It was published by Kamalalaya Book Depot, Trivandrum.
- 1979: Marthanda Varma (English) – The second English translation by R. Leela Devi was published by Sterling Publishers, New Delhi. A reprint by the same publisher was released in 1984.
- 1990: मार्ताण्ड वर्मा (Mārtāṇḍa Varmā, Hindi) – Kunnukuzhy Krishnankutty has done the Hindi translation, which was serialized and left incomplete in the editions of journal Kēraḷ Jyōti from Kerala Hindi Prachar Sabha, Thiruvananthapuram during June 1990 to December 1990.
- 2007: மார்த்தாண்ட வர்ம்மா (Mārttāṇḍa Varmmā, Tamil) – The second Tamil translation of the novel by P. Padmanabhan Thambi was published by Sahitya Akademi.
- 2024: Marthandavarma (English) – The third English translation by G S Iyer (Note: G S Iyer (1942—Present), Ganesaiyer Sankaranarayana Iyer is a former Indian diplomat, who is also one of eighth generation descendants of Subbayyan Dalawa, did the first complete English translation of C V Raman Pillai’s Dharmaraja in 2009, before translating the novel, Marthandavarma to English in 2024.), reportedly pre-published in December 2024, and available at public outlets only by 2025 through Eka of Westland Books.

== Reception ==
The novel received positive to mixed response, being the first historical novel of Malayalam literature and south India. Prof. Guptan Nair notes that the literary work was hailed as a masterpiece.

=== Critical reception ===
In the review appeared on The Hindu, Madras edition dated 21 December 1891, the novel is mentioned as a respectable specimen what an Indian graduate is capable of accomplishing in the department of fiction. P. Thanu Pillai rated the novel as a rare and valuable addition to the literature of Malayalam. Kerala Varma Valiya Koil Thampuran and Kodungallur Kunjikkuttan Thampuran ranked the novel as better than the heretofore-released novels (Note: 1. Kundalatha (കുന്ദലത, Kundalata) in 1887 by Appu Nedungadi, 2. Indulekha (ഇന്ദുലേഖ, Indulēkha) in 1889 (Note: Though Indulekha novel was reportedly published in 1889, its author, O. Chandumenon confirms that the novel was available for sale only by January 1890.) by O. Chandu Menon, 3. Indumathee Swayamvaram (ഇന്ദുമതീസ്വയംവരം, Indumatīsvayaṁvaraṁ) in 1890 by Padinjare Kovilakathu Ammaman Raja, 4. Meenakshi (മീനാക്ഷി, Mīṉākṣi) in 1890 by Cheruvalathu Chathu Nair.) in Malayalam. Kilimanoor Ravi Varma Koil Thampuran remarked that he could not keep aside the novel once he started reading the book. P. Sundaram Pillai stated that he read the novel with so much pride. The review in The Hindu criticized the free usage of Sanskrit words, which will make novel to be enjoyed by the elite people and not the general readers. Kerala Varma Valiya Koil Thampuran criticized the inappropriate usages of Sanskrit words, among which some (Note: Manōsukhaṁ, Manōkāṭhinyaṁ (മനോസുഖം, മനോകാഠിന്യം) instead of the correct ones manassukhaṁ, manaḥkāṭhinyaṁ (മനസ്സുഖം, മനഃകാഠിന്യം.)) are remarked as unpardonable blunders.

=== General reception ===
When Marthandavarma was released, the people of Trivandrum devoured it. N. Balakrishnan Nair notes that the release of novel was celebrated like a literary festival at Trivandrum. Though the novel became the topic of discussion in cottages, elite circles, clubs and law courts, the sale of book was very poor. The author did not even get the required revenue to pay the printing costs, and at one point of time, he took one hundred numbers of unsold books as a bundle to his elder brother, who was then the Tehsildar at Muvattupuzha and demanded one hundred rupees. C. V. Raman Pillai had sent unsold copies of the novel to P. Ayyappan Pillai, the then Education Secretary and to his friend P. Thanu Pillai, the then Manager of Huzur Court (Court of Appeal) at their respective offices, to have those sold. N. Balakrishnan Nair notes that the remaining copies among the one thousand numbers of first print were damaged due to infestation by termites. The general reading people slowly accepted the novel and, the author went on to release five more editions until 1911.

=== Reception of revised edition ===
The revised edition of the novel, published in 1911 by Kulalakkunnathu Raman Menon's publishing house, (Note: In 1931, the publishing house, B. V. Book Depot and Kamalalaya Printing Works and copyrights of various titles were divided among the sons & daughters and brothers & sisters of the founder, Kulakkunnathu S. Raman Menon, who died in 1925, as B. V. Book Depot and Kamalalaya Book Depot to proceed as separate institutions respectively. Kamalalaya Book Depot retained the rights of Marthandavarma, and brought out further editions, translations, abridgment under the labels, Kamalalaya Book Depot, Kamalalaya Book Depot & Printing Works, and Kamalalaya Printing Works & Book Depot.) received overwhelming positive response and became one of the best sellers of the period. N. Balakrishnan Nair notes that the sale of book was similar to that of Adhyatma Ramayana and by 1951 Kamalalaya Book Depot released the 25^{th} edition. P. Venugopalan states that it is not doubtful that Marthandavarma is the most sold book in Malayalam.

== Theme ==
=== History and chivalric romance ===
In the preamble, Pillai states that he wrote the book with the intention of creating a model of historical romance in Malayalam; historical events of the eighteenth century serve as the skeleton of the story. The novel presents the events during Kollavarsham 901 to 906 (Gregorian Calendar: 1726–1731), pertaining to disputes over the throne of Venad during 1729. According to George Irumbayam, history is wrapped in romance, and K. M. Tharakan echoes that point. The internal conflicts in this novel are presented through the character of Subhadra, while most of major conflicts in the novel are external. Kalpatta Balakrishnan notes that Anathapadmanabhan's heroic adventures combine romance and history. The novel promotes hero-worship and patriotism through romantic affectation, a mode maintained until the end.

=== Romance and romanticism ===
The realistic aspects of the novel are presented through conversations, which in its inherence and vigor provide an individuality to the story. George Irumbayam is of the view that the romantic elements in the novel are intertwined with the realistic legibility of historical elements. The honest behavior of Mangoikkal Kuruppu to the prince, the anxious preparations of Karthyayani Amma to receive Padmanabhan Thambi, short-tempered reactions of Shanku Assan represent realistic aspects in the novel. N. Balakrishnan Nair states that the novel is a love story built around a serious period in the history of Travancore. The romance of Ananthapadmanabhan and Parukutty is presented as a supporting aspect to heroism in the novel. The romance between Ananthapadmanabhan and Parukutty gives a soul and emotional angle to the historical and political themes of the novel. The historical plot about power struggle between Marthanda Varma and rebels is presented as rich and active through the love story of Ananthapadmanbhan and Parukutty. The emotional factor of the novel is further emphasized with another plot of romance involving Ananthapadmanabhan with the unrequited love of Zulaikha, thereby making the love story a love triangle. The story of Subhadra is also considered as a tragic love story, which strengthens the romantic aspects of the novel. The love failures of Subhadra and Zulaikha aid in creating a favorable surrounding for the romantic aspects of the novel. D. Benjamin remarks that the very first instance of romantic love in Malayalam literature is in this novel. The longing of Parukutty for the return of her lover, Zulaikha's love failure are seen as reminiscences of romantic love, and latter is considered as foremost romantic heroine of Malayalam literature in romanticism. The romantic aspects similar to that in Prometheus Unbound and in the apocalyptic poetry of William Blake are identified in the personality of Subhadra, with which the character conveys a conflict-oriented complexity of multi-colored romanticism.

=== Politics ===
The author's political interests are shown in allegorical form. The novel presents the conspiracies, power struggle, internal agitations in the political history of Travancore, and history provided the basic conflict and a suitable period. Novelist incorporated political and social undercurrents of Venad in the novel, which discusses a conflict between the ruler and the ruled. The social relevance lies in its questioning of the collateral rule of succession (Marumakkathayam) followed in Venad, with the failed agitation of Nair-Thambi clans to acquire power from Varmas. In a way, the basic theme of novel is the eruption of revolt against the collateral succession through maternal nephews, and the subsequent suppression of the revolt. Kalpatta Balakrishnan notes that the major theme of the novel is power struggle between the royal head and the kingship seekers, and not a conflict between the ruled and the ruler. The relevance of historical context is that, it is about the contest to acquire political power, and the political significance is that it is about forceful acquisition of royal power, and so novel is previewed as a political novel. The freedom of thought that links the ruled ones to the power is presented through Mangoikkal Kuruppu's impeccable criticism of kingship. In the high-paced narrative, the character of Subhadra creates the lot of responses, as she is the only political character in the novel, even though the character Marthanda Varma represents royal lineage, royal power and royal justice, where as Thambies and Pillas are the riotous group who try to topple the traditional rule of succession in the kingdom. Subhadra represents the patriotic code of conduct, with which she heads to defeat the attempts of rebel groups, and eventually sacrifices her life. The open claim for the throne and the subsequent agitations lead the course of actions in the novel; which in result is to topple the rule of succession of the kingdom. This no-compromise fight for the throne makes the novel rather a political history of power struggle in Venad. Novelist raises the royal position through the novel, not the personality of the royal head because the history in novel is the historical awareness constituted by the author.

=== Conflicts ===
When the historical background is kept apart, the novel represents dramatic feud between the good and bad, and concludes to the complete failure of sin and partial success of goodness in the end. The novel presents the fight between respectable and despicable characters as that in devasura conflict. According to K. M. Tharakan, though novelist tries to preach global philosophy about the final victory of goodness through various conflicts in the plot, serious effort is not taken to unveil the human mindset; however, M. P. Paul mentions that author depicts peculiar skill in presenting minute emotions of human mind, in the novel. Even though, the motif of the novel is politics, the curiosity generated in the novel is through exceptional presentation of interpersonal issues. The novel successfully comprises history of the state, interpersonal relationships, and social issues in the outset of imagination. The character of Subhadra adds the investigative mood to the plot, though she is considered as the foremost representation of tragedy in C. V. Raman Pillai's writings. The amusement-thread of the novel is led by her secretive investigations similar to that of Sherlock Holmes. The story of Subhadra is presented as a delightful tragedy, where she realizes her identity apart from the atrocities of her ancestors.

N. Krishna Pillai and Prof. V. Anandakuttan Nair state that the novel comprises three plots, among which the first one is the political theme about the power struggle between Marthanda Varma and opponents, the second is the romance of Ananthapadmanabhan and Parukutty, and the third is the tragedy of Subhadra. M. G. Sasibhooshan states that the plot consists of four sections, which are the above three together with the adventures of Marthanda Varma, and concordance of these sections made the novel as an exceptional literary work.

== Style ==
=== Structure ===
The novel is presented in twenty-six chapters describing the historical events, and each chapter is provided with an epigraph in the form of verses that implies the content of the respective chapter. The major events of the novel take place during Kollavarsham 903–904 (Gregorian Calendar: 1728), within a span of twenty-eight days, among which only eleven days are explicitly presented through the chapters from two to twenty-six. A night during the Kollavarsham 901 is presented in chapter one and a consolidated set of events until Kollavarsham 906 is narrated in the final chapter. The novel switches to earlier periods, 1680s, 1703, 1720 while describing the backgrounds of Sundarayyan and Subhadra, marriage and breakup of Subhadra, and the relationship of Ananthapadmanabhan and Parukutty. Prof. Thumpamon Thomas points that the narration is as small water streams that eventually form into a waterfall similar to the strands in a twisted rope made of coir. The author successfully combines geographical structure of locality and suitable historical period with a legitimacy of day and night, and an accuracy as in an almanac, through his narrative style.

=== Characterisation ===
The story is narrated in a non-complex structure by maintaining the momentum of heroic valor and action, while presenting three dimensional characters. The novel is noted to be focused on multiple heroes and heroines. Grorge Irumbayam states that the hero of the novel is Ananthapadmanabhan and Parukkutty is the heroine, however also mentions that the novel has dual heroines due to the prominence of the character, Subhadra. D. Benjamin notes that Marthanda Varma is the hero of novel. Kalpatta Balakrishnan remarks that Ananthapadmanabhan and Parukutty are leads of the plot only when the story is a romance, and as the story is based on the heir-ship of Marthanda Varma who leads the course of actions, Ananthapadmanabhan is not the hero of the novel. The historical environment created in the novel and the personalities of bygone period are coherent to the situations. The characters are presented in a way that it is impossible to differentiate between fictional and historical ones. N. Krishna Pillai notes that the major attributes of historical characters in the novel are specifically given by the author. The presentation of novel is unique with the creation of unprecedented characters and not through structure complexity.

=== Rhetorical dramatism ===
The presentation of characters in the novel is noted to be similar to the appearance of roles in Kathakali. The novel is noted for the usage of rhetorical embellishments in narration. The novel uses a particular style of using verses from ballads, puranas, and archaic literary works in descriptions and dialogs pertaining to the narrative situation, among which usage of quotes from puranas are comparatively less to that from Aattakatha. The major usages of quotes as epigraphs and inline ones are to indicate the plot of respective chapters or to point a particular behavior of characters, and this is noted to be a style inspired from Sir Walter Scott, as well as a manifestation of author's knowledge in the puranas, legends, yesteryear ballads, and socio-cultural situation of Venad. The narrative style comprises plenty of such embellishments as in a lyric, to form a rhetorical prose, and this is noted to be author's crookedness of narrative style. The narrative style depicts a considerable level of the coherence between the consecutive sentences and in parts, and presents notions adapted from performance arts such as Kathakali, Play, Kudiyattam, Mohiniyattam, and Bharatanatyam. The dramatic language attained in the narration is through the abundant usages of passive voice and gender-neutral pronouns in objective case, where as the archaic style of language is through usages of dative case.

=== Conversational ===
Pillai created a new style of his own for narration, in which author presents different style of languages for different characters. N. Krishna Pillai points that 64% of the novel is used for conversations of characters. The narration style interspersed with fine pieces of humor, and lively flashes of wit is stated as heartily attractive to the readers due to its simplicity and sweetness; which also leads the reader through the events of novel at fast pace. The variance in the behavior of characters are shown through specific style of language used for particular characters, and the styles of language are vigorous in conversations. The stylistic symbols among the specialties of language variance and author's idiolect marks the narration as a classic style. The unveiling of truth and mystery in the end through conversations is arguably a perfection of narration technique, according to C. Sreekanta Kurup.

=== Narration ===
The expansion of plot is noted to be through the stagnantly rising events, without pushing back the narration on the behest of describing the struggles of characters. The narration keeps the reader in suspense, with the rise of incidents out of incidents, leading to unexpected intricacies and complications with a veil of mystery until the final revelations. The novel is presented with so many events, the arrangements of which create a feel that plot is long enough to fit in a book double the present size of the novel. The narration is presented in a manner that makes a reader to feel the accomplishment of wonders in the novel are inevitable. The language used in the novel is simple and is not overly mixed with Sanskrit, when tallying with author's later novels. The language used in this novel does not create any resistance to reading, unlike in his later novels. The style of narration in Dharmaraja is termed as Kirmīravadhaśaili, adhering to author's terminology, Kiṟmīravadharīti, (Note: Malayalam: കിർമ്മീരവധരീതി, lit. 'method of slaying Kirmira') where as the narrative style used in this novel is termed as Śī Vī Śaili. The author termed it as Mārttāṇḍavaṟmmā-style, (Note: Māṟttāṇḍavaṟmmārīti (Malayalam: മാർത്താണ്ഡവർമ്മാരീതി, lit. 'Marthandavarma-method', Māṟttāṇḍavaṟmma-rīti)) which he admitted to not able to continue in his later works.

The novel features a fast-paced narrative set during the period of a prominent historical figure, incorporating core elements of historical fiction .

== Intertextuality and allusions ==
The novel has a rich focus on intertextuality, making regular references and homages to both the Indian subcontinent and Western literary traditions, histories and cultures. These sections provide a limited overview of the most important references and allusions in the novel and links to more thorough examinations of the allusions and intertextuality used throughout the novel.

=== Characters based on legends, history and real life ===
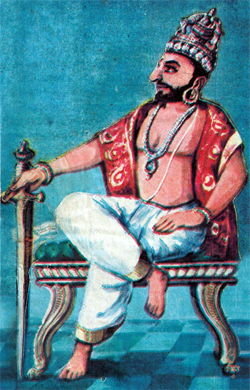
Marthanda Varma

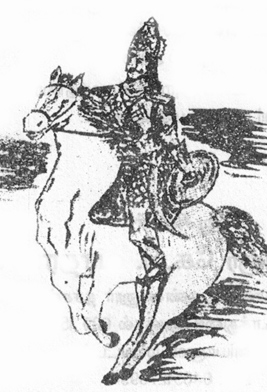
Ananthan

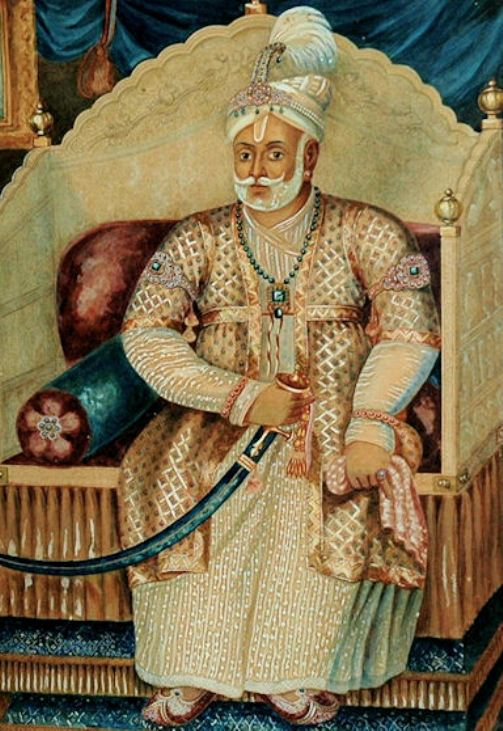
Dharmaraja

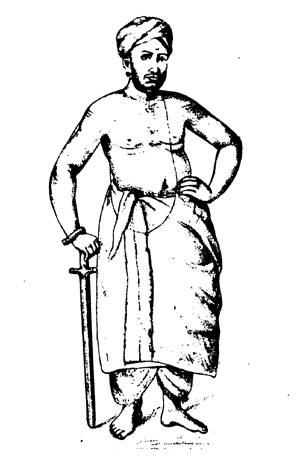
Ramayyan

Many of the characters in the novel are based on persons from history, legend and the author's life. Major characters borrowed from history include Prince Marthanda Varma (the title character) based on Marthanda Varma, Pappu Thambi and Raman Thambi based on the Thambi brothers, Ananthapadmanabhan based on Ananthan/Ananthapadmanabhan (a warrior and commander in the Travancore forces during the reign of Marthanda Varma), Mangoikkal Kuruppu based on Mangottu Assan (a martial arts master from Mancode (Note: Mancode is a village in Vilavancode taluk of Kanniyakumari district.)), Ettuveettil Pillas based on Ettuveetil Pillamar and Ramayyan based on Ramayyan Dalawa. Chulliyil Chadachi Marthandan Pilla is based on Chadachi Marthandan, a legendary figure from Chulliyur (Note: Chulliyur is a locality in the Perumkadavila Panchayat in the Neyyattinkara taluk of Thiruvananthapuram district).

Other historically sourced characters are King Rama Varma based on Rajah Rama Varma, the little Prince Karthika Thirunal Rama Varma based on the infant Dharma Raja, and Ammattampurāṭṭi who is based on his mother. There are also Narayanayyan (an assistant to Ramayyan Dalawa), and Arumukham Pilla (the acting Dalawa of Venad during Kollavarsham 901–903 and Dalawa during 904–909).

=== Events based on legends, history and politics ===
Several of the events in the book are based on occurrences from history or legend, these include: the pact between King Rama Varma and Madurai Nayaks in Kollavarsham 901 at Tiruchirappalli for the latter to supply additional forces to Travancore for a fixed annual fee, the assassination attempts on Marthanda Varma at Kalliyankattu temple, at Panathara, near the Ezhava house at Perunkadavila and at the Nedumangad fort as well as the attempt by Velu Kuruppu and his men when the mad Channan helped Marthanda Varma hide inside a tree implying the aid by a Channan plougher to hide and another attempt when Marthanda Varma hid inside the big hole within a jack tree at the Neyyattinkara Sree Krishna Swami Temple, the attempted murder of the little Prince Karthika Thirunal Rama Varma in Kollavarsham 903 while he and his mother were traveling from Trivandrum to Attingal, the heirship claim by the Thambi brothers through linear succession against the collateral rule of succession followed in Venad, the treaty of the Thambi brothers with foreign forces to out-throw Marthanda Varma from power, the council of Ettuveettil Pillas planning the murder attempt on Marthanda Varma, the coup d'état by the Thambi brothers, Marthanda Varma's accession to the throne in Kollavarsham 904 following the illness and death of King Rama Varma and the detention of Arumukham Pilla by Madurai forces.

Other events mentioned in the novel are the conquest of Desiganadu by Marthanda Varma after his accession to the throne and the Kalipankulam incident as a murder of five princes with the involvement of Ramanamadathil Pilla, as well as the death of Padmanabhan Thambi at the hands of Marthanda Varma's accomplices. The novel also refers to the attack of a Mukilan (a petty chieftain under Moghul emperor) in Travancore during Kollavarsham 853–855 when, a few families were converted to Mohammedians, and the tragic death of Iravikutti Pilla in the war against the forces of Thirumalai Nayak.

=== Architecture and geography ===
The novel describes the setting as the kingdom of Venad under the rule of the King Rama Varma. The major events occur in and around Padmanabhapuram, the capital of the kingdom, and Thiruvananthapuram within Venad. Aralvaimozhi, or Āṟāṁvaḻi, and Edava or Idava are mentioned as the south-eastern, and north-western borders of Venad, respectively.

==== Padmanabhapuram locations ====
Much of the novel is set in Padmanabhapuram Palace, Charottu Palace, and Mangoikkal House. The Darbhakulam mansion and the Kalkulam mansion of Padmanabhapuram Palace existed during the timeline of the novel. The novel describes the residence at the place of the present southern mansion on the northern side of the contemporary palace. Prince Marthada Varma halts there on his way to Boothapandi and later Padmanabhan Thambi camps there, after which fifty members of the Channar people were executed at the palace compound. Charottu Palace is 2 miles (3.218688 km) north of Padmanabhapuram Palace. The former is small, with only an enclosed quadrangular homestead (Nalukettu) and a cookhouse (Madapalli). Prince Marthanda Varma and his aide Parameswaran Pilla reside there after evading Padmanabhan Thambi at Padmanabhapuram Palace through the tunnel passage. The closed tunnel passage between Padmanabhapuram Palace and Charottu Palace had access from the Tāikoṭṭāraṁ (Mother's mansion) at the former palace, and cites its closed existence.

Mangoikkal House is 2 Nazhika north to Charode. The house includes a grove, through which the mad Channan reaches Mangoikkal House to rescue Prince Marthanda Varma. The Mangoikkal kalari (martial arts school of Mangoikkal) is nearby which aid Mangoikkal Kuruppu and his nephews. The house name Mangoikkal is in reminiscence of the house of Mangottu Assan at Mancode, and the house name of the author's patron Kesavan Thambi Karyakkar, Nangoikkal.

In the novel, Prince Marthanda Varma is cornered and trapped at Kalliancaud Temple or Kaḷḷiyankāṭṭukṣētraṁ, from where, he is later escaped as a Brahmin. The temple is Kalliancaud Sivan Kovil (located at 8°11′52″N 77°23′27″E). Ananthapadmanabhan is attacked and left for dead by Velu Kuruppu in Panchavankadu or Panchavan Forest, a forest area on the way to Nagercoil from the residence of Ananthapadmanbhan's mother near Kollavarsham 901. Prof. N. Krishna Pilla and Prof. V. Anandakuttan Nair state that Panchavankadu and Kalliyankadu are the same.

==== Thiruvananthapuram locations ====
The novel describes Thiruvananthapuram as the capital of the kingdom, but P. Venugopalan states that this is historically inaccurate, because the capital hadn't yet changed from Padmanabhapuram to Thiruvananthapuram. The novel includes four major locations in Thiruvananthapuram: Thiruvananthapuram fort, Subhadra's house, Killi river, and Manacaud.

Thekkekoyikkal or the southern mansion within the fort is home to Prince Marthanda Varma. In the novel, Velu Kuruppu tries to attack Marthada Varma, while the latter is on his way to the mansion, but is foiled by Shankarachar. The novel mentions another location within the fort, the house Chembakassery. Scholars debate Chembakassery's historicity: P. K. Parameswaran Nair assumes that Chembakassery House never existed, where as the article Anantapadmanābhan nāṭāruṁ tiruvitāṁkūṟ niṟmmitiyuṁ states that the house existed and the author was familiar with it. The fort present in the novel was later rebuilt during Kollavarsham 922–928 and eventually demolished after the independence of India; preserved ruins can be found at the east fort in Thiruvananthapuram.

Subhadra's house is a few blocks north to the royal passage at Andiyirakkam. Manacaud or Manakadu is referred to in the novel as the place where Pathan merchants are camped. Fighters of Mangoikkal also camp there, where their final confrontation with the Thambi brothers and Ettuveettil Pillas take place.

=== Sociocultural practices ===
In the novel, practices of Indian traditional medicine and Unani traditional medicine are prevalent in Venad during the timeline of the story. After having Ananthapadmanabhan drugged, Hakkim tried a kind of narcoanalysis to discover the former's whereabouts, however it yielded no results. Astrological practices are also employed, such as praśnaṁ vayppŭ (Note: An astrological practice that prevails in Kerala; in which specially selected conch shells are used for conclusions based on zodiacal positions.) and Natal astrology, which are referenced when Shanku Assan says to Parukutty that chothirisham or jyothisham will not go wrong.

The narrative depicts superstitious customs such as Ūṭṭŭ or Kāḷiyūṭṭŭ, Pāṭṭŭ, Uruvaṁ Vaypŭ, Amman Koṭa, Cāvūṭṭŭ, Uccinakāḷi Sēva as quite common among the hindu religious followers. The people at the palace conduct occult acts with clergy, priests and magicians to extend the lifetime of the king. Thirumukhathu Pilla goes for paranormal retrocognition through Mashinottam, (Note: Mashinottam is an Indian clairvoyant practice, which includes gazing on the ink laid smooth surface to view the matters that are sought.) an Indian clairvoyant practice, to confirm the rumors concerning the death of his son, Ananthapadmanabhan. Velu Kuruppu mentions that sorcery was used by a namboothiripad of the Akavoor family (Note: Akavoor Mana was a house of namboothiries situated at Vellarappilly near Kalady of Ernakulam district; some of the members of family were ascetics devoted to prayers, meditation, and Thaanthric rites.) to evoke protection on his armor shield by the incantation of seventy million Dhanwantharam, a set of hymns offered to Dhanvantari in order to safeguard against ill fortune.

Beeram Khan is a Muslim convert who is also a Nair and Subhadra's ex-spouse. He married Fathima after his proselytization to Islam, as he became a dependent of Hakkim's family. At one point, Hakkim intended to proselytize Ananthapadmanabhan to Islam with the support of Usman Khan while the latter was drugged unconscious, but could not do so because Zulaikha opposed the act. The novel presents the miscegenation between a Shasthri (an aryan race) and a lady of Marvar caste (a dravidian race); whom are the parents of Sundarayyan and Kondanki.

Padmanabhan Thambi is represented as a philanderer whose paramours include: Kamalam, Sivakami, the mistress at the seventh house and the unnamed female prostitute at Kottar. Subhadra mentions that he was after her since she was ten years old. Consequently, Ananthapadmanabhan opposes his father's agreement to a marriage proposal for his younger sister from Padmanabhan Thambi. When the proposal is cancelled, an enraged Sundarayyan says to Ananthapadmanabhan to keep an incestuous relationship with his younger sister; to which Ananthapadmanabhan makes a racist remark against Sundarayyan that "thān maṟavanaṭō" (hey! you are a Maravar). This further enrages Sundarayyan to favor the attack on Anathapadmanabhan at Panchavankadu, which starts the series of events in the novel.

The Venad royal family follows the heirship through Marumakkathayam, collateral descent through maternal nephews. In the novel, Sundarayyan points out that this system is opposed to the common system of heirship through Makkathayam (lineal descent through sons) and proposes to raise a claim to the throne for the elder son of King Rama Varma, Padmanabhan Thambi, who at one point conveyed his concern to Sunadarayyan that the latter system would bring his younger brother Raman Thambi against him. The Ettuveettil Pillas pledge to make Padmanabhan Thambi the next king by assassinating Prince Marthanda Varma, the legal heir to the kingdom, even though the Ettuveettil Pillas follow the system of matrilineality with avuncular paterfamilias. Some of the Ettuveettil Pillas are noted to be of Vellalar clan, who follow Makkathayam.

=== Writers and literature ===
The novel explicitly mentions Thunchaththu Ezhuthachan, P. Shangoony Menon, and also refers to Shankaracharyar as kēraḷēcārakaṟttāvŭ, which means the author of customs in Kerala, Venmani Achhan Nambudiripad as kavikulōttaṁsan (one at the crest of poets clan) and compares his lifetime to that of Sundarayyan.

==== Story-line adaptation ====
The novel uses the references to the Ettuveettil Pillas in the Sree Veera Marthandavarmacharitham Aattakatha, to form the characters and also uses the four-line verse about them as epigraph to the eleventh chapter. The character of Sundarayyan in the novel is similar to the character of Pichakappalli in this Aattakatha.

The situations in which Marthanda Varma escapes the attempts on his life by Thambi's men are in line with similar events from the Marthandamahathmyam, a lyrical work written as a Kilippattu based on the stories about Marthanda Varma.

The attack at Mangoikkal house by Padmanabhan Thambi's men is similar to the attack and eventual burning of Mangottu Assan's house in Ottan Katha, one of the ballads of Venad based on the stories about Marthanda Varma.

Ivanhoe by Sir Walter Scott is considered to be the most influential work in the development of Marthandavarma. Like in Ivanhoe, the first chapter of the novel opens with the description of a forest, and every chapter opens with an epigraph similar to those in Scott's books. M. P. Paul claims that the characters Marthanda Vama, Ananthapadmanabhan, Chulliyil Chadachi Marthandan Pilla are based on characters from Ivanhoe, even though they are based on the history and legends of Venad.

M. P. Paul also claims that the situations involving either the mad Channan, Subhadra or Thirumukhathu Pilla are similar to situations in King Lear by William Shakespeare, the character of Shanku Assan is similar to that of Dominie Sampson in Guy Mannering by Sir Walter Scott. M. Leelavathy points that the character of Subhadra is prototyped from the Flora McIvor of Waverley by Sir Walter Scott.

Neelikatha (subplot)
According to P. Venugopalan, the story of Panchavankattu Neeli (Pañcavankāṭṭunīli, lit. Neeli of Pachavan forest) in the third chapter of the novel is a combination of stories form the ballads Panchavankattu Neelikatha (Pañcavankāṭṭunīlikatha) and Neelikatha (Nīlikatha, lit. story of Neeli). Thikkurissi Gangadharan states that Kaḷḷiyankāttunīli (Neeli of Kalliyancaud) is changed to Pañcavankāṭṭunīli by the author of the novel.

==== Appropriations ====
The novel heavily incorporates verses from Nalacharitham Aattakatha (Day 1, Day 2, Day3, Day4) Adhyathmaramayanam Kilippattu, Sree Mahabharatham Kilippattu by Thunchaththu Ezhuthachan, Harishchandracharitham Aattakatha by Pettayil Raman Pilla Asan, Ravanavijayam Aattakatha by Vidwan Rajarajavarma Koi Tampuran of Kilimanur, Rukmineeswayamvaram Aattakatha by Aswathi Thirunal Ramavarma Thampuran, Kalakeyawadham Aattakatha by Kōṭṭayattŭ Tampuran, Bashanaishadham Champu by Mazhamangalam as epigraphs, as descriptions and quotations. The novel also draws verses from Kirmeerawadham Aattakatha by Kōṭṭayattŭ Tampuran, Subhadraharanam Aattakatha by Mantṟēṭattŭ Nampūtiri, Dakshayagam Aattakatha by Irayimman Thampi, Banayudham Aattakatha by Bālakavi Rāmaśāstrikaḷ, Keechakawadham Aattakatha by Irayimman Thampi, Rāmāyaṇaṁ (Irupattunālu vr̥ttaṁ), Ramayanam Vilpattu, Vethalacharitham Kilippattu by Kallēkuḷaṅṅara Rāghavapiṣāraṭi, Symanthakam Ottan Thullal by Kunchan Nambiar, Krishnarjunavijayam Thullal, Kuchelavritham Vanchipattu by Ramapurathu Varrier. The novel also comprises verses from the ballads Neelikatha, Ponnarithal Katha, Mavaratham, and Iravikuttipillaporu.

=== Languages ===
The novel mentions the languages, Malayalam, Tamil and Hindustani, among which the former one is used primarily for the narration with the adopted words from Tamil, Sanskrit, English, Hindustani, Persian and a conversation in a substitution cipher, Mulabhadra.

Malayalam is the primary language used in the novel, Sanskrit words are extensively used in the novel such as khādyapēyalēhyabhōjya (Note: Sanskrit: खाद्यपेयलेह्यभोज्य, ഖാദ്യപേയലേഹ്യഭോജ്യ) (lit. chew-able, drinkable, lick-able, and eatable), tējaḥpuñjaṁ (lit. heap of ardor) (Note: Malayalam: തേജഃപുഞ്ജം, a form of Sanskrit: तेजःपुञ्ज, tējaḥpuñja). Tamil words and prepositions are used in the statements of Shanku Assan, Anantham, Mangoikkal Kuruppu and in the narrations, among which, the Tamil word nāyaki (lit. spouse [feminine]) (Note: Tamil: நாயகி, Malayalam: നായകി) in the first edition of the novel is replaced with the malayalam one nāyika (lit. heroine) (Note: Malayalam: നായിക, adapted from Sanskrit: नायिका, lit. 'the lady who leads', nāyikā) in the revised edition. The novel uses the word caittān which is a form of Hindustani word šaitān (lit. devil) (Note: Hindi: शैतान, شیطون, analogous to Arabic: شیطون, romanized: šayṭān rooted from the Hebrew: שָׂטָן, romanized: śāṭān.), and also uses the word bahadūṟ, a form of Hindustani word bahādur (Note: Hindi: बहादुर, بهادر adapted from the Persian: بهادر, romanized: bahadur rooted from the Ottoman Turkish: بهادر, Turkish: baghatur, bahadır.) (lit. brave). The novel makes a malayalam usage for the shawl used by Thirumukhathu Pilla as sālva, which is analogous to the English word and the Persian version shāl, (Note: Persian: شال) and for the meaning of guard while referring to the posture of Chembakassery Mootha Pilla at the door of Parukutty's room, the novel uses a word gāṭṭŭ akin to the obsolete form gard.

The novel uses the word kinkāb which is a form of word kinkhab, which stands for silk brocade with gold and silver designs and term is a conjoined form of kin and khab originated or westernized from kam (Note: Hindi: कम, lit. 'less') and khwab (Note: Hindi: ख्वाब, lit. 'dream' analogous to Hindi: ख़्वाब, Urdu: خواب, romanized: xvāb rooted from the Persian: خواب, romanized: xâb.) respectively.

- Ambiguous usage – The novel presents the ambiguous usages of the term nazhika, (Note: Malayalam: നാഴിക, nāḻika) as a unit of measure for time and as a unit of measure for length. Nazhika^{1} as a unit of measure for time is analogous to Ghaṭi and 1 Nazhika corresponds to 24 minutes. Nazhika^{2} is a unit of measure for length prevailed in yesteryear Kerala at different denominations such as 1 Nazhika = 1.828 kilometers and 1 Nazhika = 914.4 meters. The C. V. Vyakhyanakosam (Note: C. V. Vyakhyanakosham is a lexicographic work in four volumes published by C. V. Raman Pillai National Foundation during 1994–2004, comprising explanations and interpretations of words, phrases, idioms used by C. V. Raman Pillai in his literary works, four novels and nine farces, which include Marthandavarma.) states that 1 Nazhika in the novel corresponds to approximately 1.5 kilometers.

== Adaptations ==
=== Abridgement ===
- 1964: Marthandavarma – An abridged version by Kannan Janardhanan, (Note: Kannan Janardhanan (1885–1955), was a journalist and writer in Malayalam known under his real name, Kunnath Janardhana Menon. He authored the abridged version of C. V. Raman Pillai's Marthandavarma followed by that of Dharmaraja, both of which were published posthumously under the pen name Kannan Janardhanan in 1964 and 1968 respectively.) published by Kamalalaya Book Depot.
- 1984: Kuttikalude Marthandavarma – An abridged version by M. M. Basheer, published by C. V. Raman Pillai National Foundation.
- 2003: Pandupandoru Marthanda Varma – An abridged version by Subhash Chandran, published by Haritham Books, Kozhikode.
- 2011: Marthandavarma – An abridged version by Prof. P. Ramachandran Nair, published by D. C. Books with illustrations by Reji Karimulackal.
- 2012: Marthandavarma – An abridged version by V. Ramachandran, distributed through National Book Stall, Kottayam.

=== Comics ===
In 1985, Amar Chitra Katha comics of IBH Publishers Pvt. Ltd released an English comic book adaptation of novel. The thirty-two pages of comic book adaptation was scripted by Radha Nair, illustrated by M. Mohandas, had the cover art by Ramesh Umrotkar under the consultancy by Ram Waeerkar and editing by Anant Pai.

In 2007, the comic book adaptation was released in Malayalam by Balarama Amar Chithra Katha of Malayala Manorama group as Māṟttāṇḍavaṟmma. The title The Legend of Maathaanda Varma was later altered to Maarthaanda Varma and released in 2010 by Amar Chitra Katha Pvt. Ltd, and it was included in the comics-collection The Great Indian Classics.

=== Films ===
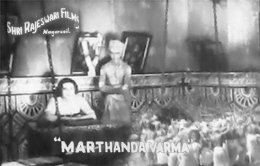
Marthanda Varma (1933)

- 1933: Marthanda Varma – a silent black & white film directed by P. V Rao.

The film released on 12 May 1933 to face litigation from the publishers of the novel during the period through a court order as the producer of the movie did not have the required rights, subsequently the film was retained by court authorities and imposed a stay on further screening of the film till the closure of legal proceedings which later went against the film producer. Thus, the film marked the first of its kind copyright case involving a literary work and a feature film in India by being a second feature film of Malayalam film industry and the novel being the first Malayalam literary work to adapt to a film from the same industry.

- 1997: Kulam – a loose adaptation directed by Lenin Rajendran

The film released on 21 February 1997 through Ambadi Pictures, focuses only on the story of Subhadra, the pivotal character of the novel by exploring her marital and non-marital relationships finally to her murder by Kudamon Pilla.

=== Television ===
- 2003: Marthanda Varma – A television serial directed by Suryan Chennithala. The telecast of the serial commenced on 15 January 2003 at 18:00 hours as an episode of 30 minutes on Doordarshan's Thiruvananthapuram channel. The serial was abruptly discontinued after the telecast of fourth episode on 3 March 2003 due to non-agreement of terms between the producer and the television channel team.
- 2010: Veera Marthanda Varma – A television serial produced by Colosceum Media Pvt Ltd. The telecast commenced on 19 July 2010 through Surya TV as a daily serial on weekdays from Monday to Friday at 21:30 hours, which was later changed to weekend slot after the eighty-third episode in November 2010. The telecast slots of the serial on Surya TV were intermittently skipped from March 2011 and eventually it was discontinued after the 128^{th} episode on 21 May 2011.
- 2014: Marthanda Varma – A television play based on the script of stage adaptation by P. Venugopalan and performed in 2013, with the same cast members who reprised their roles from the stage performance except for a few including the replacement of Jiji Kalamandir by Vinayan for the role of mad Channan. The program was telecasted on 27 March 2014 at 15:30 hours through DD Malayalam, and it was re-telecasted as six episodes on Sundays from the following week.

=== Theatre ===
Marthandavarma was first adapted for theater in 1919 by Sree Chithira Thirunal Grandhasala. It featured an all-male cast. N. Rajan Nair notes that Nair societies of Palkulangara, Vanchiyoor and Kunnukuzhy also staged theatre adaptations in early days. The cultural organization, Kalavedi of Thiruvananthapuram forayed into theatre adaptations of Marthandavarma from 1957. N. Rajan Nair points that a stage performance of Marthandavarma once happened at Kozhikode and performances are happened at Delhi, Bombay and Madras under the respective Malayali associations.

- 2008: Marthanda Varma – A stage adaptation directed by Kaladharan staged on 18 May 2008 at VJT hall, Thiruvananthapuram under the banner of cultural organization, Rasika.
- 2013: Marthanda Varma – A stage adaptation staged on 19 May 2013 17:30 hours at Prof. N. Krishnapillai Foundation Theatre, Nandavanam under the banner of Kalavedi, Thiruvananthapuram.

=== Radio ===
- 1991–1992: Marthandavarma – A radio play produced by All India Radio, Thiruvananthapuram. The radio play was broadcast in 30 minutes episodes, every Wednesday at 21:30 hours from 17 July 1991 to 1 January 1992, and it was re-broadcast in 15-minute episodes from Monday to Saturday at 14:15 hours between 20 January 2014 and 8 February 2014.
- 2012: Subhadra – A radio program produced by All India Radio, Thiruvananthapuram. The radio play was broadcast in 30 minutes episodes, every Wednesday at 21:30 hours from 28 November 2012 to 12 December 2012.

== Sequels ==
Raman Pillai received many requests for a sequel, and created three, and these novels together with Marthandvarma are known as C. V. Raman Pillai's Novel Trilogy. (Note: Malayalam: സി. വി. രാമൻപിള്ളയുടെ നോവൽത്രയം, romanized: Si.Vi. Rāmanpiḷḷayuṭe Nōvaltrayaṁ They are also known as C. V. yude Charithrakhyayikakal (Malayalam: സിവിയുടെ ചരിത്രാഖ്യായികകൾ, romanized: Siviyuṭe Caritrākhyāyikakaḷ, lit. 'CV's Historic Narratives').).

- 1913 : Dharmaraja – The story follows the novel with the return of Thripura Sunadari Kunjamma, the sister of Thevan Vikaraman Kazhakkoottathu Pillai and her granddaughter Meenakshi to Travancore and subsequent situations in which Kesava Pillai (young Kesavadas) gets involved with the proceedings of Chandrakaran, the son of Ramanamadathil Pillai and the emergence of Haripanchanan as the antagonist, who is later revealed by Ananthapadmanabhan to be one among the twins of Thripura Sunadari Kunjamma, Ugran, who plan to topple the kingdom.
- 1918 : Ramarajabahadur Part I – The story continues with the return of Chandrakaran as Manikyagoundan while Tipu Sultan is planning a march to Travancore for eventual conquer and presents cousin of Raja Kesavadas, Perinchakodan as main antagonist, who abducts Savithri, the daughter of Meenakshi.
- 1919 : Ramarajabahadur Part II – After the failed meeting of Raja Kesavadas and the Ajithasimhan, the messenger of Tipu Sultan, war ensues between the Mysore forces and Travancore forces.

P. K. Parmeswaran Nair guesses that Raman Pillai's Diṣṭadaṁṣṭṟaṁ, serialized in the 1920 periodical Mitabhāṣi to incomplete is the follow-up of above story. N. Balakrishnan Nair states that C. V. Raman Pillai never wrote the third part of story based on Raja Kesavadas. Ayyappa Panicker, who analyzes the published texts of Diṣṭadaṁṣṭṟaṁ to find no historical or related references to above story line and concludes the claim of P. K. Parameswaran Nair as a mere assumption.

== Significance ==
=== Influence ===
The novel was a forerunner in Malayalam historical fiction. According to Kalpetta Balakrishnan, C. R. Velu Pillai's Rājaśēkaran and K. M. Varghese's Nellimūṭṭile Nammuṭe Ammacci and Taccil Māttu Tarakan were influenced by Marthandavarma. Kunjunni Mash said he wrote a novel after reading Marthandavarma at young age, but never published it. For Malayalam writer Paul Zacharia, Marthandavarma gained him the ability to imagine a scene for his writing career.

- Kuñcuttampimāṟ, the historical novel by N. Parameswaran Pilla, is presented as an unauthorized sequel to Marthandavarma.
- Śītālakṣmi, the historical play by E. V. Krishna Pillai, is also considered an unauthorized sequel.

=== Academic usage ===
The literary significance of novel led the text of the novel to be used in school curriculum as original and abridged forms, and also been included in the course programs offered by various universities of south India.

- School curriculum – An abridged version of the novel is used as Malayalam II Reader / Malayāḷaṁ Upapāṭhapustakaṁ for Standard IX under Kerala State Education Board during 1977–1986. The chapter 24 of the novel was used as third chapter in Malayalam I Reader / Kēraḷa Pāṭhāvali of Standard X during 1987–2004 under the same education board.
- University curriculum – The novel is prescribed as study material for B.A. programmes in Malayalam offered by Kannur University (2014), Mahatma Gandhi University (1998, 2009), Pondicherry University (2010), University of Kerala (1977, 1991, 1997, 2004–2012). The text of the novel is prescribed for M.A. programmes in Malayalam offered by Madurai Kamaraj University (1998–2008), Mahatma Gandhi University (1991–1992), University of Kerala (1984, 1977–1992, 2007, 2012, 2013) and as a reference book for M.A. programme in Malayalam offered by University of Madras.

=== Relevance ===
Marthandavarma has the highest position among the novels in Malayalam, particularly historical novels. The novel attracts new readers and researchers over the time and remains as the most popular historical novel in Malayalam, thus considered as one among the classics of Malayalam literature. The novel is noted for the excellent narrative combined with chivalric romance and realism respectively thru unexpected adventurous events and the historical facts than in the author's later historical novels, compared to which, the elegant romantic aspects tied with history makes the legends presented in this novel as believable. The sequels Dharmaraja and Ramarajabahadur could not surpass the reception of Marthandavarma. The novel is also the subject in the marketing of other historical novels. D. C. Books, in one of their advertisements for novel Atijīvanaṁ by Ettumanoor Somadasan, states that there would not be any Malayali who has not read the novel Marthandavarma.

== See also ==
- Ettara Yogam
- Kurup of Travancore
- Koyi Thampuran

== Sources ==
- Aiya, V. Nagam (1999) [1906]. The Travancore State Manual. Vol. I. Thiruvananthapuram: Kerala Gazetteers Department, Govt. of Kerala.
- Kunju, Dr. A.P. Ibrahim (2005) [1990]. Māṟttāṇḍavaṟmma: Ādhunika Tiruvitāṁkūṟinṟe Udayaṁ മാർത്താണ്ഡവർമ്മ: ആധുനിക തിരുവിതാംകൂറിന്റെ ഉദയം [Marthanda Varma : Rise of Modern Travancore] (in Malayalam). Thiruvananthapuram: Cultural Publications Department, Govt. of Kerala.
- Pillai, T.K. Velu (1996) [1940]. The Travancore State Manual (in Malayalam). Vol. II. Thiruvananthapuram: Kerala Gazetteers Department, Govt. of Kerala.
  - Anonymous authors (1996) [1325–1872]. Pillai, T.K. Velu (ed.). Historical Documents (in Malayalam).
- Menon, P. Shangoony (1998) [1879]. History of Travancore from the Earliest Times. New Delhi: Asian Educational Services. ISBN 9788120601697.
- Pillai, C. V. Raman (1992) [1891]. Māṟttāṇḍavaṟmma മാർത്താണ്ഡവർമ്മ [Marthandavarma] (in Malayalam) (Definitive Variorum ed.). Kottayam: D. C. Books. ISBN 8171301304.
  - Pillai, C. V. Raman (2009) [1891]. Māṟttāṇḍavaṟmma മാർത്താണ്ഡവർമ്മ [Marthandavarma] (Definitive Variorum Revised ed.).
    - Pilla, Prof. N. Krishna; Nair, Prof. V. Anandakkuttan (2009) [1983]. Māṟttāṇḍavaṟmma: Caritravuṁ Kalpanayuṁ മാർത്താണ്ഡവർമ്മ: ചരിത്രവും കല്പനയും [Marthandavarma: History and Figment] (in Malayalam).
    - Pilla, Prof. N. Krishna; Nair, Prof. V. Anandakkuttan (2009) [1983]. Kathākālaṁ; saṁbhavasthalaṅṅaḷ കഥാകാലം; സംഭവസ്ഥലങ്ങൾ [Timeline of story; Incident locations] (in Malayalam).
    - Pilla, Dr. K. Raghavan (2009) [1983]. Si. Vi. yuṭe Caritrākhyāyikakaḷkk Orāmukhaṁ സി വി യുടെ ചരിത്രാഖ്യായികകൾക്ക് ഒരാമുഖം [An Introduction to CV's Historical Narratives] (in Malayalam).
    - Venugopalan, Dr. P. (2009) [1992]. Sūcitasāhityakr̥tikaḷ - oru paṭhanaṁ സൂചിതസാഹിത്യകൃതികൾ - ഒരു പഠനം [Referred Literary works – A study] (in Malayalam).
    - Venugopalan, Dr. P. (2009) [1992]. Māṟttāṇḍavaṟmma: Sr̥ṣṭiyuṁ svarūpavuṁ മാർത്താണ്ഡവർമ്മ: സൃഷ്ടിയും സ്വരൂപവും [Marthandavarma: Creation and Formation] (in Malayalam).
    - Venugopalan, Dr. P. (2009) [1992]. Vyākhyānakuṟippukaḷ വ്യാഖ്യാനക്കുറിപ്പുകൾ [Explanatory notes] (in Malayalam).
    - Kizhakemuri, D C (2009) [1992]. Pṟasādhakakkuṟippŭ പ്രസാധകക്കുറിപ്പ് [Publishers' Note] (in Malayalam).
    - Paniker, Dr. Ayyappa (2009) [1992]. Śatābdi Praśasti ശതാബ്ദി പ്രശസ്തി [Centenary Fame] (in Malayalam).
- Nair, Prof. Panmana Ramachandran, ed. (2013). Si. Vi. Paṭhanaṅṅaḷ സി. വി. പഠനങ്ങൾ [C. V. Studies]. Thiruvananthapuram: P. K. Parameswaran Nair Memorial Trust. ISBN 9788124019566.
  - Sasibhooshan, Dr. M. G. (2013). Peruntaccanṟe Baliṣṭhaśilpaṅṅaḷ പെരുന്തച്ചന്റെ ബലിഷ്ഠശില്പങ്ങൾ [Perunthachan's Strong Structures] (in Malayalam).
  - Nair, Dr. N. Rajan (2013). Si. Vi. Nōvalukaḷ Araṅṅatt സി. വി. നോവലുകൾ അരങ്ങത്ത് [C. V. Novels on Stage] (in Malayalam).
  - Ajithkumar, Dr. N. (2013). Janakīyasaṁskāraṁ ജനകീയസംസ്കാരം [Popular Culture] (in Malayalam).
  - Nair, Dr. Poojapura Krishnan (2013). Rasāviṣkaraṇaṁ Si.Vi.Nōvalukaḷil രസാവിഷ്കരണം സി.വി.നോവലുകളിൽ [Representation of themes in C. V. Novels] (in Malayalam).
  - Benjamin, Dr. D. (2013). Dēśacaritraṁ Si.Vi.yuṭe Nōvalukaḷil ദേശചരിത്രം സി.വി.യുടെ നോവലുകളിൽ [Locality history in C.V.'s novels] (in Malayalam).
  - Nair I. A. S, R. Ramachandran (2013). Rājavītiyuṁ Prajādhaṟmmavuṁ രാജനീതിയും പ്രജാധർമ്മവും [Royal policies and populus ethics] (in Malayalam).
- Pillai, C.V. Raman (1891). Māṟttāṇḍavaṟmmā മാൎത്താണ്ഡവൎമ്മാ [Marthandavarma] (in Malayalam) (First ed.). Trivandrum: C.V. Raman Pillai.
- Pillai, C.V. Raman (1971) [1891]. Māṟttāṇḍavaṟmma മാൎത്താണ്ഡവൎമ്മ [Marthandavarma] (in Malayalam). Trivandrum: Kamalalaya Book Depot.
- Pillai, C.V. Raman (1973) [1891]. Māṟttāṇḍavaṟmma മാൎത്താണ്ഡവൎമ്മ [Marthandavarma] (in Malayalam). Kottayam: Sahitya Pravarthaka Co-operative Society Ltd.
  - Pillai, C.V. Raman (1991) [1891]. Māṟttāṇḍavaṟmma മാൎത്താണ്ഡവൎമ്മ [Marthandavarma] (in Malayalam). Kottayam: Sahitya Pravarthaka Co-operative Society Ltd.
- Irumbayam, Dr. George (2010) [1982]. Ādyakāla Malayāḷanōval ആദ്യകാല മലയാളനോവൽ [Early Malayalam Novel] (in Malayalam). Kottayam: Sahitya Pravarthaka Co-operative Society Ltd.
- Paniker, Dr. Ayyappa (1993). Si. Vi. Rāman Piḷḷa സി. വി. രാമൻ പിള്ള [C. V. Raman Pillai]. Malalyalam Men of Letters (in Malayalam). Thiruvananthapuram: Dept. of Publications, University of Kerala.
- Nair, N. Balakrishnan (1951). Sākṣāl Si. Vi സാക്ഷാൽ സി. വി. [Real C. V.] (in Malayalam). Thiruvananthapuram: Kamalalaya Printing Works & Book Depot.
- Nair, P. K. Parameswaran (2014) [1948]. Si. Vi. Rāman Piḷḷa സി. വി. രാമൻ പിള്ള [C. V. Raman Pillai] (in Malayalam). Thrissur: Kerala Sahitya Akademi.
- Gopalakrishnan, Malayankeezh (2007). Ji. Pi. Piḷḷa Mahātmagāndhikk Māṟgadaṟśiyāya Malayāḷi ജി. പി. പിള്ള മഹാത്മാഗാന്ധിക്ക് മാർഗദർശിയായ മലയാളി [G. P. Pillai : Malayali guidance to Mahatma Gandhi] (in Malayalam). Thriruvananthapuram: Information & Public Relations Department, Govt. of Kerala.
- Krishnan, K. S. (1991) [1988]. Si. Vi. Caritrākhyāyikakaḷilūṭe സി. വി. ചരിത്രാഖ്യായികകളിലൂടെ [C. V., through the Historical Narratives] (in Malayalam). Kottayam: Sahitya Pravarthaka Co-operative Society Ltd.
- Irumbayam, Dr. George (2009) [1996]. Nōval Si.Vi. Mutal Baṣīṟ Vare നോവൽ സി. വി. മുതൽ ബഷീർ വരെ [Novel : From C. V. until Basheer] (in Malayalam). Thrissur: Kerala Sahitya Akademi.
- Pilla, K. R. Parameswaran (1921). "Si. Vi. Rāmanpiḷḷa Avaṟkaḷuṭe Nōvaleḻuttŭ" സി. വി. രാമൻപിള്ള അവർകളുടെ നോവലെഴുത്ത് [The novel scripting of respected C. V. Raman Pillai]. Ātmapōṣiṇi (in Malayalam). XI (9). Kunnamkulam: Akshara Ratna Prakasika.
- Jeffrey, Robin (2014) [1976]. The Decline of Nair Dominance: Society and Politics in Travancore, 1847-1908. New Delhi: Manohar Publishers & Distributors. ISBN 9789350980347.
- Mahapatra, B. P.; Padmanabha, P.; McConnell, Grant D.; Verma, V. S. (1989). Constitutional languages. The Written Languages of the World: A Survey of the Degree and Modes of Use. India. Vol. II. Québec: Les Presses de l'Université Laval. ISBN 9782763771861.
- Das, Sisir Kumar (2005) [1991]. A History of Indian Literature: 1800-1910, Western Impact: Indian Responses. Vol. I (Reprint ed.). New Delhi: Sahitya Akademi. ISBN 9788172010065.
- Vohra, Anirudh (28 June 2015). "Gujarat's Last Rajput King Karan Ghelo: A king's life". Industry. New Delhi: The Financial Express. Archived from the original on 10 March 2016.
- Herzberger, Radhika (19 July 2015). "A Fine Balance: Nandshankar's Karan Ghelo and the Downfall of Gujarat's Last Rajput Ruler". Vantage. New Delhi: The Caravan.
- Deo, Shripad D. (1996). Natarajan, Nalini; Nelson, Emmanuel Sampath (eds.). Handbook of Twentieth-Century Literatures of India. Westport, Connecticut: Greenwood Press. ISBN 9780313287787.
- Nayak, J. K.; Pati, Madhusudana (1982). The Historical Novel in Oriya. Cuttak: Shri Anant Misra, Cuttak Students' Store.
- Samal, J. K.; Nayak, P. K. (1996). Makers of Modern Orissa. New Delhi: Abhinav Publications. ISBN 9788170173229.
- Yousaf, Farida (2001). "Scott and Sharar: A study of Common Aspects of Historical Themes" (PDF). Faculty of Languages & Islamic Studies. Journal of Research. Multan: Bahauddin Zakariya University. Archived from the original (PDF) on 29 October 2010.
- George, K. M., ed. (1992). Modern Indian Literature, an Anthology: Surveys and Poems. Vol. I. New Delhi: Sahitya Akademi. ISBN 9788172013240.
  - Murthy, K. Narasimha (1992). Modern Kannada Literature.
  - Padmanabhan, Neela (1992). Modern Tamil Literature.
- Narasiṃha Rao, V. V. Yal (1993). Chilakamarti Lakshmi Narasimham. Makers of Indian literature. New Delhi: Sahitya Akademi. ISBN 9788172014995.
- Elenkath, K. R. (1974). Dewan Nanoo Pillay Biography with his select writings and letters. Neyyoor-West: Dewan Nanoo Pillay Memorial Reading Room.
  - Pillay, Nanoo (1974) [1886]. Elenkath, K. R. (ed.). The Sketch of Progress of Travancore.
- Nair, Perunna K. N. (1984). Warrier, P. A.; Kizhakemuri, D. C. (eds.). Kuḷakkunnattu Rāmamēnōn Māḷiyammāvu Kuññuvaṟīt Es. Ṭi. Ṟeḍyāṟ E. Ke. Ṭi. Ke. Eṁ Tōmas Pōḷ Eṁ. Je. Tōmas കുളക്കുന്നത്തു രാമമേനോൻ മാളിയമ്മാവു കുഞ്ഞുവറീത് എസ്. ടി. റെഡ്യാർ എ. കെ. ടി. കെ. എം. തോമസ് പോൾ എം. ജെ. തോമസ് [Biographies of Kulakkunnathu Raman Menon, Maliyammavu Kunjuvareethu, S. T. Reddiar, A. K. T. K. M. Vasudevan Namboothiripad, Thomas Paul, M. J. Thomas]. Mahacharithamaala (in Malayalam). Kottayam: Kairali Childrens Book Trust.
- Das, Sisir Kumar (2006) [1995]. A History of Indian Literature: 1911-1956, Struggle for Freedom : Triumph and Tragedy. Vol. II (Reprint ed.). New Delhi: Sahitya Akademi. ISBN 9788172017989.
- Pillai, C. V. Raman (1983) [1891]. Māṟttāṇḍavaṟmma മാർത്താണ്ഡവർമ്മ [Marthandavarma] (in Malayalam). Kozhikode: Poorna Publications.
  - Pillai, C. V. Raman (2009) [1891]. Māṟttāṇḍavaṟmma മാർത്താണ്ഡവർമ്മ [Marthandavarma] (in Malayalam) (Fourth ed.). Kozhikode: Poorna Publications.
    - Haridevan (2009) [1983]. Bhūmika ഭൂമിക [Prelude] (in Malayalam) (Fourth ed.).
- Pillai, C. V. Raman (1999) [1891]. Māṟttāṇḍavaṟmma മാർത്താണ്ഡവർമ്മ [Marthandavarma] (in Malayalam). Thrissur: Kerala Sahitya Akademi. ISBN 8176900001.
- Pillai, C. V. Raman (1983) [1891]. Māṟttāṇḍavaṟmma മാർത്താണ്ഡവർമ്മ [Marthandavarma] (in Malayalam). Kottayam: Little Prince Publications.
- Pillai, C. V. Raman (2009) [1891]. Māṟttāṇḍavaṟmma മാർത്താണ്ഡവർമ്മ [Marthandavarma]. Malayalam Classics (in Malayalam). Kollam: Rachana Books.
- Pillai, C. V. Raman (2013) [1891]. Māṟttāṇḍavaṟmma മാർത്താണ്ഡവർമ്മ [Marthandavarma]. Nōval Paḻama (in Malayalam). Thiruvananthapuram: Chintha Publishers.
- Pillai, C. V. Raman (2016) [1891]. Māṟttāṇḍavaṟmma മാർത്താണ്ഡവർമ്മ [Marthandavarma] (in Malayalam). Thrissur: Lal Books.
- Pillai, O. Krishna (1954). Mārttāṇṭa Varma மார்த்தாண்ட வர்மா [Marthandavarma] (in Tamil). Trivandrum: Kamalalaya Book Depot.
- Menon, B.K (1936). Marthanda varma (First ed.). Trivandrum: Kamalalaya Book Depot.
  - Menon, B.K (1998) [1936]. Marthanda varma (Revised ed.). New Delhi: Sahitya Akademi.
    - Jayakumar, Prema (1998). Foreword.
- Devi, R. Leela (1984) [1979]. Marthanda varma (Second ed.). New Delhi: Sterling Paperbacks.
- Krishnankutty, Kunnukuzhy (1990). "Mārtāṇḍa Varma" मार्ताण्ड वर्मा [Marthandavarma]. Keral Jyoti (in Hindi). XXV (3). Thiruvananthapuram: Kerala Hindi Prachar Sabha.
- Thambi, P. Padmanabhan (2007). Mārttāṇṭa Varmma மார்த்தாண்ட வர்ம்மா [Marthandavarma] (in Tamil). New Delhi: Sahitya Akademi. ISBN 978-8126016587.
- Nair, S. Guptan (1992). C. V. Raman Pillai (First ed.). New Delhi: Sahitya Akademi.
  - Unknown reporter (1992) [1891]. Nair, S. Guptan (ed.). Appendix I: Editorial from THE HINDU, dated December 21, 1891.
- Nair, P. K. Parameswaran (2010) [1958]. Malayāḷa sāhityacaritraṁ മലയാള സാഹിത്യചരിത്രം [Malayalam literary history] (in Malayalam) (12^{th} ed.). New Delhi: Sahitya Akademi.
- Staff Reporter (5 October 2010). "Seminar in memory of Appu Nedungadi". Kerala. Palakkad: The Hindu.
- Paul, M. P. (1991) [1930]. Nōvalsāhityaṁ നോവൽസാഹിത്യം [Novel Literature] (in Malayalam) (First Poorna ed.). Kozhikode: Poorna Publications.
- Anima, P. (31 January 2012). "Tours de force in Kozhikode". Editorial Features. Kozhikode: The Hindu.
- Chandumenon, O (1995) [1890]. Indulēkha ഇന്ദുലേഖ [Indulekha] (in Malayalam). Kottayam: D. C. Books.
- Irumbayam, Dr. George (July 1981). "Treasures of Malayalam Literature from Europe". Indian Literature. 24 (4). New Delhi: Sahitya Akademi.
- "Sahithya Pravarthaka Cooperative Society Ltd Vs. Kamalalaya Printing Works And Book Depot". Encyclopedia. Ahmadabad: Regent Computronics Pvt. Ltd. Archived from the original on 21 April 2015.
- Balakrishnan, Dr. Kalpatta (2005) [1986]. Caritṟanōval Malayāḷattil ചരിത്രനോവൽ മലയാളത്തിൽ [Historical Novel in Malayalam] (in Malayalam). Thrissur: Kerala Sahitya Akademi. ISBN 8176900869.
- Irumbayam, Dr. George (1997) [1984]. Malayāḷanōval Pattompatāṁ Nūṯāṇṭil മലയാളനോവൽ പത്തൊമ്പതാം നൂറ്റാണ്ടിൽ [Malayalam Novel in Nineteenth Century] (in Malayalam). Thiruvananthapuram: Cultural Publications Department, Govt. of Kerala.
- Thomas, Prof. Thumpamon (1992). Malayāḷanōvalil Oru Punḥapariśōdhana മലയാളനോവലിൽ ഒരു പുനഃപരിശോധന [A Re-examination in Malayalam Novel] (in Malayalam). Kottayam: Sahitya Pravarthaka Co-operative Society Ltd.
- Tharakan, Prof. K. M. (2005) [1978]. Malayāḷa Nōval Sāhitya Caritṟaṁ മലയാള നോവൽ സാഹിത്യ ചരിത്രം [History of Malayalam Novel Literature] (in Malayalam). Thrissur: Kerala Sahitya Akademi. ISBN 8176900788.
- Pillai, Dr. A. M. Vasudevan (1991). Nōvaluṁ Rāṣṭṟīyavuṁ നോവലും രാഷ്ട്രീയവും [Novel and Politics] (in Malayalam). Thrissur: Kerala Sahitya Akademi.
- Benjamin, Dr. D. (2010) [1994]. Nōvalsāhityapaṭhanaṅṅaḷ നോവൽസാഹിത്യപഠനങ്ങൾ [Novel literature studies] (in Malayalam). Thiruvananthapuram: MaluBen Publications. ISBN 9788187480655.
- Kurup, C. Sreekanta (2007). Si. Vi. Manasuṁ Kalayuṁ സി.വി. മനസ്സും കലയും [C.V. Mind and Art] (in Malayalam). Kottayam: The Book Digest.
- Pilla, Prof. N. Krishna (2011) [1986]. Pratipātraṁ Bhāṣaṇabhēdaṁ പ്രതിപാത്രം ഭാഷണഭേദം [Speech variance per character] (in Malayalam) (2^{nd} DCB ed.). Kottayam: D. C. Books. ISBN 978-8171303946.
- Onakkoor, Dr. George (2013). Nāyaka Sankalpaṁ Malayāḷa Nōvalil നായക സങ്കല്പം മലയാള നോവലിൽ [Concept of Hero in Malayalam Novel] (in Malayalam). Kottayam: Ascend Publication.
- Nair, S. Guptan (2001). Gadyaṁ Pinniṭṭa Vaḻikaḷ ഗദ്യം പിന്നിട്ട വഴികൾ [Paths passed by prose] (in Malayalam). Kottayam: D. C. Books.
- Prabodhachandran, Dr. V. R. (2003). Śailībhaṁgikaḷ ശൈലീഭംഗികൾ [Style-charms] (in Malayalam). Thiruvananthapuram: State Institute of Languages.
- Pillai, C. V. Raman (2009) [1918]. Rāmarājābahadūṟ രാമരാജാബഹദൂർ [Ramarajabahadur] (in Malayalam). Kottayam: Sahitya Pravarthaka Co-operative Society Ltd.
- Paul, M. P. (2005). Sāhityavicāraṁ സാഹിത്യവിചാരം [Literary thought] (in Malayalam) (First Lipi ed.). Kozhikode: Lipi Publications.
- Padmakumari, Prof. J.; Hussain, K.B.M, eds. (2003). Valiyatampi Kuñcutampi Katha വലിയതമ്പി കുഞ്ചുതമ്പി കഥ [Big Brother Small Brother Story] (in Malayalam). Thiruvananthapuram: State Institute of Languages.
- Immanuel, Dr. M.; Sarveswaran, Dr. P., eds. (2011). Māvīraṉ Taḷapati Aṉantapatmanāpaṉ மாவீரன் தளபதி அனந்தபத்மநாபன் [Great Commander Ananthapadmanabhan] (in Tamil). Nagercoil: Cultural Historical Linguistic Indigenous Research Organisation, India.
  - Shobhanan, Dr. B. (2011). A Note on Ananthapadmanabhan.
  - Parthan (2011). Anantapatmanābhan nāṭāruṁ tiruvitāṁkūṟ niṟmmitiyuṁ അനന്തപത്മനാഭൻ നാടാരും തിരുവിതാംകൂർ നിർമ്മിതിയും [Ananthapadmanabhan Nadar and Travancore formation] (in Malayalam).
- Sarveswaran, Dr. P., ed. (1982). Ōṭṭaṉ Katai ஓட்டன் கதை [Runner Tale] (in Tamil). Madurai: Mano Publishers.
- Varatharajan, K. P. (2000). Tiruvaṭi Tēcaṁ Tiruppāppūr Paramparai Śrīmat Aṉantapatmanāpaṉ Nāṭār Varalāṟu திருவடி தேசம் திருப்பாப்பூர் பரம்பரை மாவீரன் ஶ்ரீமத் அனந்தபத்மநாபன் நாடார் வரலாறு [History of great hero Mr. Ananthapadmanabhan Nadar in Thripappur lineage of Thiruvati nation] (in Tamil). Kattathurai: Ananthapadmanabhan Trust.
- Gopalakrishnan, Dr. Naduvattom (2008). Nāṭōṭi Caritrakkathakaḷ നാടോടി ചരിത്രക്കഥകൾ [Folk historical stories] (in Malayalam). Thiruvananthapuram: Malu Ben Publications.
- Valath, V. V. K. (1998). Kēraḷattile Sthalacaritraṅṅaḷ : Tiruvaṉantapuraṁ Jilla കേരളത്തിലെ സ്ഥലചരിത്രങ്ങൾ : തിരുവനന്തപുരം ജില്ല [Locality histories in Kerala : Thiruvananthapuram district] (in Malayalam). Thrissur: Kerala Sahitya Akademi.
  - Pilla, Sooranad Kunjan (1998) [1992]. Valath, V. V. K. (ed.). Kiḻakkē kōṭṭayuṁ paṭiññāṟē kōṭṭayuṁ കിഴക്കേ കോട്ടയും പടിഞ്ഞാറേ കോട്ടയും [East fort and West fort] (in Malayalam).
- Balakrishnan, Dr. B. C.; Kartha, K. B.; Nair, Prof. Aliam Bhaskaran; Omana, Ms. P. V., eds. (1994). Si. Vi. Vyākhyānakōśaṁ സി. വി. വ്യാഖ്യാനകോശം [C. V. Exegetic Dictionary] (in Malayalam). Vol. I. Thiruvananthapuram: C. V. Raman Pillai National Foundation.
- Balakrishnan, Dr. B. C.; Satheesh, Mrs. P. V. Omana, eds. (1997). Si. Vi. Vyākhyānakōśaṁ സി. വി. വ്യാഖ്യാനകോശം [C. V. Exegetic Dictionary] (in Malayalam). Vol. II. Thiruvananthapuram: C. V. Raman Pillai National Foundation.
- Balakrishnan, Dr. B. C.; Satheesh, Mrs. P. V. Omana, eds. (2002). Si. Vi. Vyākhyānakōśaṁ സി. വി. വ്യാഖ്യാനകോശം [C. V. Exegetic Dictionary] (in Malayalam). Vol. III. Thiruvananthapuram: C. V. Raman Pillai National Foundation.
- Balakrishnan, Dr. B. C.; Satheesh, Mrs. P. V. Omana, eds. (2004). Si. Vi. Vyākhyānakōśaṁ സി. വി. വ്യാഖ്യാനകോശം [C. V. Exegetic Dictionary] (in Malayalam). Vol. IV. Thiruvananthapuram: C. V. Raman Pillai National Foundation.
  - Venugopalan, Dr. P. (2004). Anubandhaṁ 3: Uddharaṇaṅṅaḷ, Upādāvaṅṅāḷ അനുബന്ധം 3 : ഉദ്ധരണങ്ങൾ, ഉപാദാനങ്ങൾ [Annexure 3 : Quotations, Appropriations] (in Malayalam).
- Nair, P. K. Parameswaran (1959) [1948]. Si. Vi. Rāman Piḷḷa സി. വി. രാമൻ പിള്ള [C. V. Raman Pillai] (in Malayalam). Thriuvananthapuram: Kerala Sahithya Sahakarana Sangham.
- Krishnan, K. S. (1993). Si Vi yuṭe mūnnu kathāpātraṅṅaḷ സി വി യുടെ മൂന്നു കഥാപാത്രങ്ങൾ [C.V's three characters] (in Malayalam) (First ed.). Kottayam: Sahitya Pravarthaka Co-operative Society Ltd.
- "Prasnam". Services. Kottayam: PN Sreedharan Nampoothiri, Piraliyil Illam. Archived from the original on 1 October 2015.
- Narayanan, K. S. (2010). "Mashinottam, A unique Divinatory Path". Articles on Astrology. Chennai: Express Starteller.
- Narayanan, Dr Akavoor (2005). Bhattathiripad, P. Vinod (ed.). "Akavoor Mana". Some Namboothiri Illams. Calicut: Namboothiri Websites Trust.
- Janarthanan, M. (June 2008). A History of Nayars of South Travancore (Ph.D.). Tirunelveli: Manonmaniam Sundaranar University.
- Pillai, Dr. P. V. Velayudhan (2000). Āṇuṅṅaḷillātta Koṟa Valyakoṟa (Si.vi nōvalukaḷ oru punaṟvāyana) ആണുങ്ങളില്ലാത്ത കൊറ വല്യകൊറ (സി.വി. നോവലുകൾ ഒരു പുനർവായന) [Scarcity of Men is a major exiguity (C. V. Novels, a re-reading)] (in Malayalam). Thiruvananthapuram: Prabhatham Printing and Publishing Co.
- Devi, R. Leela (1978). Influence of English on Malayalam Novels. Trivandrum: College Book House.
- George, K. M. (1998) [1972]. Western Influence on Malayalam Language and Literature. New Delhi: Sahitya Akademi.
- Gangadharan, Dr. Thikkurissi (22 August 2012). Madhusudanan, M. S.; Vellayani, Manju (eds.). "Vēṇāṭṭile yakṣikaḷ" വേണാട്ടിലെ യക്ഷികൾ [Fairies of Venad]. Kerala Kaumudi Weekily (in Malayalam). 16 (34). Thriruvananthapuram: Kerala Kaumudi.
- Variyar, Unnayi (2003) [1700–1750]. Naḷacaritaṁ (Onnāṁ Divasaṁ) നളചരിതം (ഒന്നാം ദിവസം) [Nalacharitham (1^{st} day)] (in Malayalam) (Fourth ed.). Kottayam: Sahitya Pravarthaka Co-operative Society Ltd.
- Variyar, Unnayi (2001) [1700–1750]. Naḷacaritaṁ (Raṇṭāṁ Divasaṁ) നളചരിതം (രണ്ടാം ദിവസം) [Nalacharitham (2^{nd} day)] (in Malayalam). Kottayam: Sahitya Pravarthaka Co-operative Society Ltd.
- Variyar, Unnayi (2007) [1700–1750]. Naḷacaritaṁ (Mūnnāṁ Divasaṁ) നളചരിതം (മൂന്നാം ദിവസം) [Nalacharitham (3^{rd} day)] (in Malayalam). Kottayam: Sahitya Pravarthaka Co-operative Society Ltd.
- Variyar, Unnayi (2003) [1700–1750]. Naḷacaritaṁ (Nālāṁ Divasaṁ) നളചരിതം (നാലാം ദിവസം) [Nalacharitham (4^{th} day)] (in Malayalam). Kottayam: Sahitya Pravarthaka Co-operative Society Ltd.
- Ezhuthachan, Thunchathu (1999) [1500–1699]. Śrīmahābhārataṁ Strīpaṟvvaṁ ശ്രീമഹാഭാരതം സ്ത്രീപർവ്വം [Great Mahabharat – Lady Section] (in Malayalam) (Fourth ed.). Kottayam: Sahitya Pravarthaka Co-operative Society Ltd.
- Padmakumari, Prof. J., ed. (2009). Tekkan Pāṭṭukaḷ : Pāṭhavuṁ Paṭhanavuṁ തെക്കൻ പാട്ടുകൾ : പാഠവും പഠനവും [Southern Ballads : Text and Study] (in Malayalam). Thrissur: Kerala Sahitya Akademi.
- Pilla, P. Govinda, ed. (1917). Malayāḷattile Paḻaya Pāṭṭukaḷ മലയാളത്തിലെ പഴയ പാട്ടുകൾ [Old songs in Malayalam] (in Malayalam). Thiruvananthapuram: Vidyavilasa Prasideekaranashala.
- Gangadharan, Dr. Thikkurissi, ed. (2011). Iravikkuṭṭippiḷḷappōr Oru Pṭhanaṁ ഇരവിക്കുട്ടിപ്പിള്ളപ്പോര് ഒരു പഠനം [Fight of Ravikutty Pillai : A study] (in Malayalam). Thriruvananthapuram: Sahithya Kairali Publications.
- Sumathi, G. J. (2004) [2002]. Elements of Fashion and Apparel Design. New Delhi: New Age International Publishers.
- Vasu, Dr. A. C (2009). Enṟe Malayāḷaṁ എന്റെ മലയാളം [My Malayalam] (in Malayalam). Thrissur: Kerala Sahitya Akademi.
- Pillai, Rosscote Krishna (2013). Gopalakrishnan, R. (ed.). "My Dear Ayyappaji". Malayalam Literary Survey (12). Thrissur: Kerala Sahitya Akademi.
- Janardhanan, Kannan (1964). Māṟttāṇḍavaṟmma മാർത്താണ്ഡവർമ്മ [Marthandavarma] (in Malayalam) (Abrid. ed.). Thiruvananthapuram: Kamalalaya Book Depot.
- Janardhanan, Kannan (1968). Dhaṟmarājā ധർമ്മരാജാ [Dharmaraja] (in Malayalam) (Abrid. ed.). Thiruvananthapuram: Kamalalaya Book Depot.
- Thilleri, Vasu (26 November 2013). Political journalism and national movement in Malabar (Ph.D.). Malappuram: University of Calicut.
- Sivadasan, V (4 September 2012). Agrarian problems and the role of media and literature in Kerala: with special reference to socio-economic transformation 1934-1971 (Ph.D.). Kannur: Kannur University.
- Basheer, Dr. M. M. (1984). Kuṭṭikaḷuṭe Māṟttāṇḍavaṟmma കുട്ടികളുടെ മാർത്താണ്ഡവർമ്മ [Children's Marthandavarma]. Children's Literature (in Malayalam). Thiruvananthapuram: C. V. Raman Pillai National Foundation.
- Subhash Chandran (2003). Paṇṭupaṇṭoru māṟttāṇḍavaṟmma പണ്ടുപണ്ടൊരു മാർത്താണ്ഡവർമ്മ [Long long ago a Marthanda Varma] (in Malayalam). Kozhikode: Haritham Books. ISBN 9788192827087.
- Nair, Prof. P. Ramachandran (2011). Māṟttāṇḍavaṟmma മാർത്താണ്ഡവർമ്മ [Marthandavarma]. Punarākhyānaparampara (in Malayalam) (Children's Literature ed.). Kottayam: D. C. Books. ISBN 9788126429806.
- Ramachandran, Dr. V. (2012). Māṟttāṇḍavaṟmma മാർത്താണ്ഡവർമ്മ [Marthandavarma] (in Malayalam) (Abridged Novel ed.). Kottayam: Dr. V. Ramachandran.
- Radha Nair (w), M. Mohandas, Ramesh Umrotkar (a), Anant Pai (ed). "A Historical Romance from Kerala" The Legend of Maarthaanda Varma, no. 346 (December 1985). Bombay: IBH Publishers Pvt. Ltd.
- Radha Nair (w), M. Mohandas, Ramesh Umrotkar (a), Anant Pai (ed). "A Romantic Legend from Kerala" Maarthaanda Varma, vol. 813 (December 2010). Mumbai: Amar Chitra Katha Pvt. Ltd.
- Radha Nair (w), M. Mohandas, Ramesh Umrotkar (a), N. M. Mohanan (ed). മാർത്താണ്ഡവർമ്മ [māṟttāṇḍavaṟmma], vol. XVII, no. 6 (September 2007). Kottayam: Balarama Amar Chithra Katha.
- Chabria, Suresh, ed. (2013) [1994]. Light of Asia : INDIA SILENT CINEMA 1912-1934 (Expand. ed.). New Delhi: Niyogi Books. ISBN 9789383098026.
- "Introduction". Malayalam Cinema. Thiruvananthapuram: Public Relations Development, Government of Kerala. Archived from the original on 12 April 2014.
- M, Bindu Menon (June 2009). "Romancing history and historicizing romance". Circuits of Cinema: a symposium on Indian cinema in the 1940s and '50s. New Delhi: Seminar: Web Edition.
- "ചലച്ചിത്ര ചരിത്രം" ചലച്ചിത്ര ചരിത്രം [Movie History]. ചലച്ചിത്ര രംഗം [Movie Scene] (in Malayalam). Thiruvananthapuram: Thiruvananthapuram Municipal Corporation. Archived from the original on 9 June 2019.
- Vijayakumar, B. (7 March 2013). "Marthanda Varma 1931". Metro Plus. Thiruvananthapuram: The Hindu. Archived from the original on 13 April 2014.
- Kodampuzha, T. H. (31 March 1996). "Subhadrayuṭe Kumāran" സുഭദ്രയുടെ കുമാരൻ [Subhadra's Kumaran]. Chithrabhumi (in Malayalam). XV (1). Kozhikode: Mathrubhumi Publishing & Printing Company Ltd.
- Jayakumar, G. (26 January 2006). "The politics of a relationship". Friday Review. The Hindu. Archived from the original on 3 November 2015.
- Malayilkada, Vinil (1998). "Śuṣkamāya Bhāviyuṁ Selakṭīvāya Kāṇikaḷuṁ" ശുഷ്കമായ ഭാവിയും സെലക്ടീവായ കാണികളും [Dry future and selective viewers]. Chithrabhumi (in Malayalam). XLII (16). Kozhikode: Mathrubhumi Publishing & Printing Company Ltd: 7–9.
- Balakrishnan, K., ed. (2002). "channel page". Rashtra Deepika Cinema (in Malayalam). 8 (26). Kottayam: Rashtra Deepika Ltd.
- Thambi, N. Gopinathan; Vellarada, P. M. Mani (15 January – 3 March 2003). Marthanda Varma. Thiruvananthapuram. 30 minutes in. Doordarshan. DD Thiruvananthapuram.
- Syamala, C. N. (1 July 2014). No.67(5)/RIACT/AI/DKT/3449 (Report). Thiruvananthapuram: Doordarshan Kendra.
- Liza, George (22 October 2010). "Real to reel". Metro Plus. Television. Thiruvananthapuram: The Hindu.
- Sharma, Gautham (19 July 2010 – 21 May 2011). "Episode-1". Veera Marthanda Varma. Thiruvananthapuram. 30 minutes in. Sun Network. Surya TV.
- Sharma, Gautham (19 July 2010 – 21 May 2011). "Episode-9". Veera Marthanda Varma. Thiruvananthapuram. 30 minutes in. Sun Network. Surya TV.
- Sharma, Gautham (19 July 2010 – 21 May 2011). "Episode-84". Veera Marthanda Varma. Thiruvananthapuram. 30 minutes in. Sun Network. Surya TV.
- Venugopalan, Dr. P. (27 March 2014). Marthanda Varma. Thiruvananthapuram. Event occurs at 15:30. Doordarshan. DD Malayalam.
- Venugopalan, Dr. P. (30 March – 4 May 2014). Māṟttāṇḍavaṟmma മാർത്താണ്ഡവർമ്മ [Marthanda Varma]. Thiruvananthapuram. 30 minutes in. Doordarshan. DD Malayalam.
- Staff Reporter (18 May 2013). "A classic goes on stage, with its gist intact". Today's Paper. National. Thiruvananthapuram: The Hindu. Archived from the original on 31 August 2014.
- Shameer (23 May 2013). "Tiruvitāṁkūṟinṟe Caritrarēkhakaḷumāyi Māṟttāṇḍavaṟmma Avatarippiccu" തിരുവിതാംകൂറിന്റെ ചരിത്രരേഖകളുമായി മാർത്താണ്ഡവർമ്മ അവതരിപ്പിച്ചു [Marthanda Varma staged with historical notes of Travancore]. literature (in Malayalam). Thiruvananthapuram: Madhyamam. Archived from the original on 9 March 2014.
- Staff Reporter (17 May 2008). "Anniversary celebrations". Metro Plus. Today's Paper. Thiruvananthapuram: The Hindu.
- Remakant, Manu (30 May 2008). "In memory of a maestro". Friday Review. Today's Paper. Thiruvananthapuram: The Hindu.
- G., Gopalakrishnan (17 July 1991 – 1 January 1992). Marthandavarma. Thiruvananthapuram. 30 minutes in. All India Radio. Akashvani Thiruvananthapuram.
- G., Gopalakrishnan (20 January – 8 February 2014). Marthandavarma. Thiruvananthapuram. 15 minutes in. All India Radio. Akashvani Thiruvananthapuram.
- Nair, K. V. Neelakandan (28 November – 12 December 2012). Subhadra. Thiruvananthapuram. 30 minutes in. All India Radio. Akashvani Thiruvananthapuram.
- Pillai, C. V. Raman (1994) [1913]. Dhaṟmarājā ധർമ്മരാജാ [Dharmaraja] (in Malayalam). Kottayam: Sahitya Pravarthaka Co-operative Society Ltd.
- Thekkummoodu, Dr. B. Balanandan (2010). Saṟggātmakatayuṭe Śṟutibhēdaṅṅaḷ സർഗ്ഗാത്മകതയുടെ ശ്രുതിഭേദങ്ങൾ [Sough Variations of Creativity] (in Malayalam). Thiruvananthapuram: Souparnika Publication.
- Pallippuram, Sippy (2010). "Oriṭatt Oriṭatt Oru Kuññuṇṇi" ഒരിടത്ത്‌ ഒരിടത്ത്‌ ഒരു കുഞ്ഞുണ്ണി [At one place, At one place A Kunjunni]. puzhakids (in Malayalam). Aluva: Puzha.com. Archived from the original on 24 September 2015.
- Sebastian, Shevlin (5 September 2009). "The write sttuff". Kochi. Kochi: The New Indian Express. Archived from the original on 27 April 2015.
- Lal, Mohan, ed. (2001) [1992]. Encyclopaedia of Indian Literature: Sasay to Zorgot. Vol. V. New Delhi: Sahitya Akademi. ISBN 8126012218.
- Kēraḷa Pāṭhāvali കേരള പാഠാവലി [Kerala Reader]. Standard X (in Malayalam). Thiruvananthapuram: SCERT, Govt. of Kerala. 1997 [1988].
- Māṟttāṇḍavaṟmma Upapāṭhapustakaṁ മാർത്താണ്ഡവർമ്മ ഉപപാഠപുസ്തകം [Marthandavarma Sub-textbook]. Standard IX (in Malayalam). Thiruvananthapuram: SCERT, Govt. of Kerala. 1985 [1977].
- Sanalkumaran, M. (8 June 2015). SIL/684/Mal/45/15 (Report). Madurai: Madurai Kamaraj University.
- P, Sivappu (6 February 2015). KU/SPIO/RTI/2221-2230 (ii) (Report). Kannur: Kannur University.
- CBCS/RTI/2015/196 (Report). Chennai: University of Madras. 24 March 2015.
- 1049/RTI.2/2015/PR (Report). Thiruvananthapuram: University of Kerala. 4 February 2015.
- AC AIII/1/41/2015 (Report). Kottayam: Mahatma Gandhi University. 13 May 2015.
- "Detailed Syllabus For Ba.Malayalam – Core And Allied Scheme Of Question Papers" (PDF). Minutes Of The Meeting Division Of Syllabus Detailed Syllabus For Foundation Course. Pondicherry: Pondicherry University. 2010.
- "Pṟācīna Kēraḷattinṟe Vipulacaritṟamāyi Oru Nōval" പ്രാചീന കേരളത്തിന്റെ വിപുലചരിത്രമായി ഒരു നോവൽ [A Novel with detail history of ancient Kerala]. Novel (in Malayalam). Kottayam: D. C. Books. 20 November 2013. Archived from the original on 6 December 2013.
- HT Picks editor (11 January 2025). "A new translation of an old classic". Hindustan Times. Books. Vol. CI, no. 10. New Delhi: HT Media.
- Web editor (10 January 2025). "Translated fiction: In 1741, King Marthandavarma thwarts the colonial ambitions of the Dutch". BOOK EXCERPT. Mumbai: Scroll.in.
- Backflap editor (9 February 2025). "Marthandavarma". The Sunday Tribune. Backflap. Vol. 145, no. 39. Chandigarh: The Tribune Trust.
- A V S Namboodiri (9 May 2025). "Seamless weaving of history and fiction". Deccan Herald. Books. Vol. 77, no. 327. Bangalore: The Printers Mysore.
- Anonymous editor (19 May 2009). "Dalawa and the diplomat". Thiruvananthapuram. Thiruvananthapuram: The New Indian Express.
- Official correspondent (20 May 2009). "CV a model of renaissance in Malayalam literature". Thiruvananthapuram. Thiruvananthapuram: The New Indian Express.
- G S Iyer (2009). Dharmaraja (First ed.). Chennai: Tranquebar Press. ISBN 9788189975500.
- G S Iyer (2024). Marthandavarma (First ed.). Chennai: Eka. ISBN 9789360459024.
