= Subbayyan Dalawa =

Dewan of Travancore

Warkala Subbayyan
- Born: Varkala
- Other names: Warkala Subbayyan, Sankara Subrahmanya Iyer
- Occupation: Dalawa (Minister)
- Years active: 1763–1768

Sankara Subrahmanya Iyer popularly known as Subbayyan or Subbayyan Dalawa was the Dewan of erstwhile Travancore Kingdom (now part of India) during 1763 and 1768 and was responsible for the expansion of the kingdom by annexing Parur and Alangad kingdoms. Sree Viswanatha Swamy temple, in Varkala, 1 km from both Kedavathuvila and Dalawapuram junctions, behind the present NES Block Office is historically associated with Subbayyan. The family quarters of the head priest of the temple is believed to be the birthplace of Subbayyan Dalawa.

== See also ==
- Dewan
- Travancore
- PGN Unnithan
- Marthandavarma (novel)
