= Leela Devi =

Indian writer

R. Leela Devi
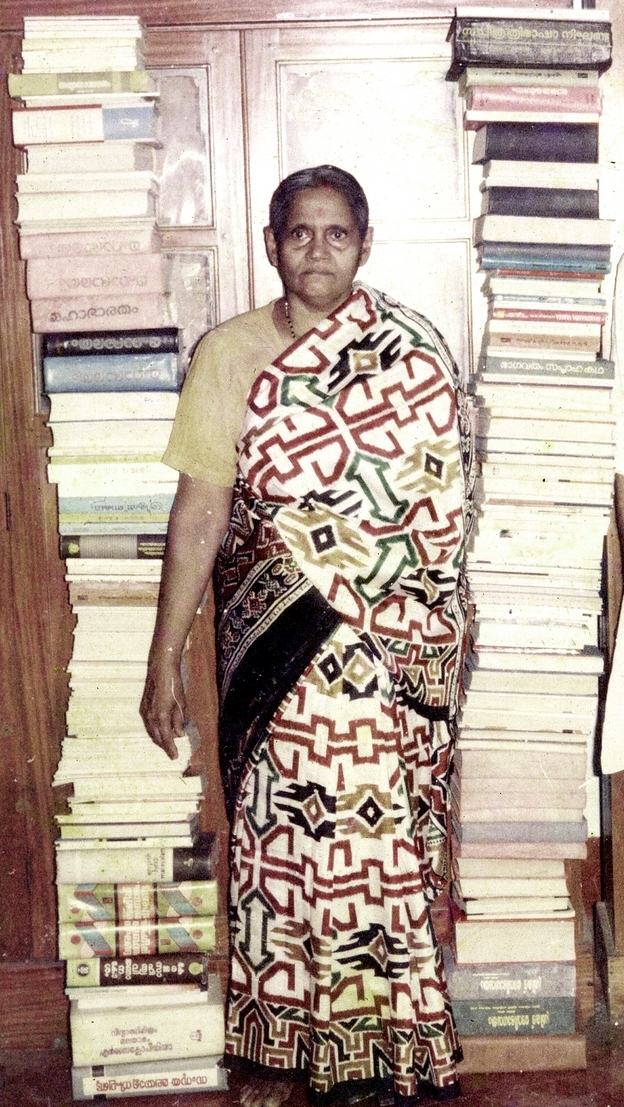
- R. Leela Devi
- Born: 13 February 1932; Pala, Kerala, India
- Died: 19 May 1998 (aged 66); Kottayam, Kerala, India

R. Leela Devi (13 February 1932 – 19 May 1998) was an Indian writer, translator, and teacher who wrote in English, Malayalam, and Sanskrit. She was from the state of Kerala.

== Career ==
Dr. R. Leela Devi wrote and translated more than 300 books with her husband V. Balakrishnan. She translated the Marthandavarma, Narayaneeyam, and Vidur Gita (Mahabharata), among others, and contributed to the English language section of the book Contribution of Writers to Indian Freedom Movement (see Indian independence movement).

She translated Chandu Menon's Indulekha into English as Crescent Moon.

== Selected works ==
- From Representation to Participation – the first book on Panchayatiraj- Sri Satguru Publications (Delhi)
- Sarojini Naidu – biography
- Blue Jasmine – fantasy novel
- Saffron – a novel about the myths and legends of Kashmir
- Mannatthu Padmanabhan and the Revival of Nairs in Kerala – the renaissance of the Nairs and their history
- An Epoch in Kerala History
- History of Malayalam Literature
- Kerala History
- Influence of English on Malayalam Literature
- Indian National Congress – Hundred Years – history of the Indian National Congress, published for Congress Centenary.
- A Handbook of English Teaching
- Ethics(In various Religions of the World)- Sri Satguru Publications (Delhi)
- Vedic Gods and Some Hymns- Sri Satguru Publications (Delhi)
- Vidura Gita- Text & English Translation- Sri Satguru Publications (Delhi)
- Naganandam by Harshavardhana- Sri Satguru Publications (Delhi)
