= G. Parameswaran Pillai =

Indian judge

G. Parameswaran Pillai (1890–1963), also known as "GP", was the Chief Secretary and Officiating Dewan of the erstwhile Travancore kingdom in pre-Independence India. He started his career as a lawyer, and later became Judge of the Court of Travancore, before joining the administration. The Maharaja of Travancore eventually conferred on him the title of Rajyasevapraveena.

His contributions to the State of Travancore and later to India are numerous. He was considered an authority on constitutional matters and was deputed to India's Round Table Conference in London in 1930, as a constitutional expert in the delegation led by Mahatma Gandhi and Dewan Bahadur T. Raghaviah, the Adviser for Madras States. He served as Post-War Reconstruction Officer following several years of service as Chief Secretary. He negotiated with the Federal Government, working closely with Sardar Patel and V.P. Menon, on behalf of Travancore to finalise the Instrument of Accession. After India won Independence, he served as independent India's first Trade Commissioner to Australia and New Zealand (the Trade Commissioner position was later changed to that of the High Commissioner).

He served as one of the first Directors on the Board of Governors of the Reserve Bank of India and founded the Co-operative Bank. His service on administrative reforms committee set up by the State Government is well recognized. He also served on educational committees set up by Prime Minister Jawaharlal Nehru, working in close association with Maulana Abul Kalam Azad, Dr. Zakir Husain, Rao Bahadur Krishnamachari, Honourable Rajkumari Amrit Kaur et al.
