= M. M. Basheer =

Malayalam literary critic

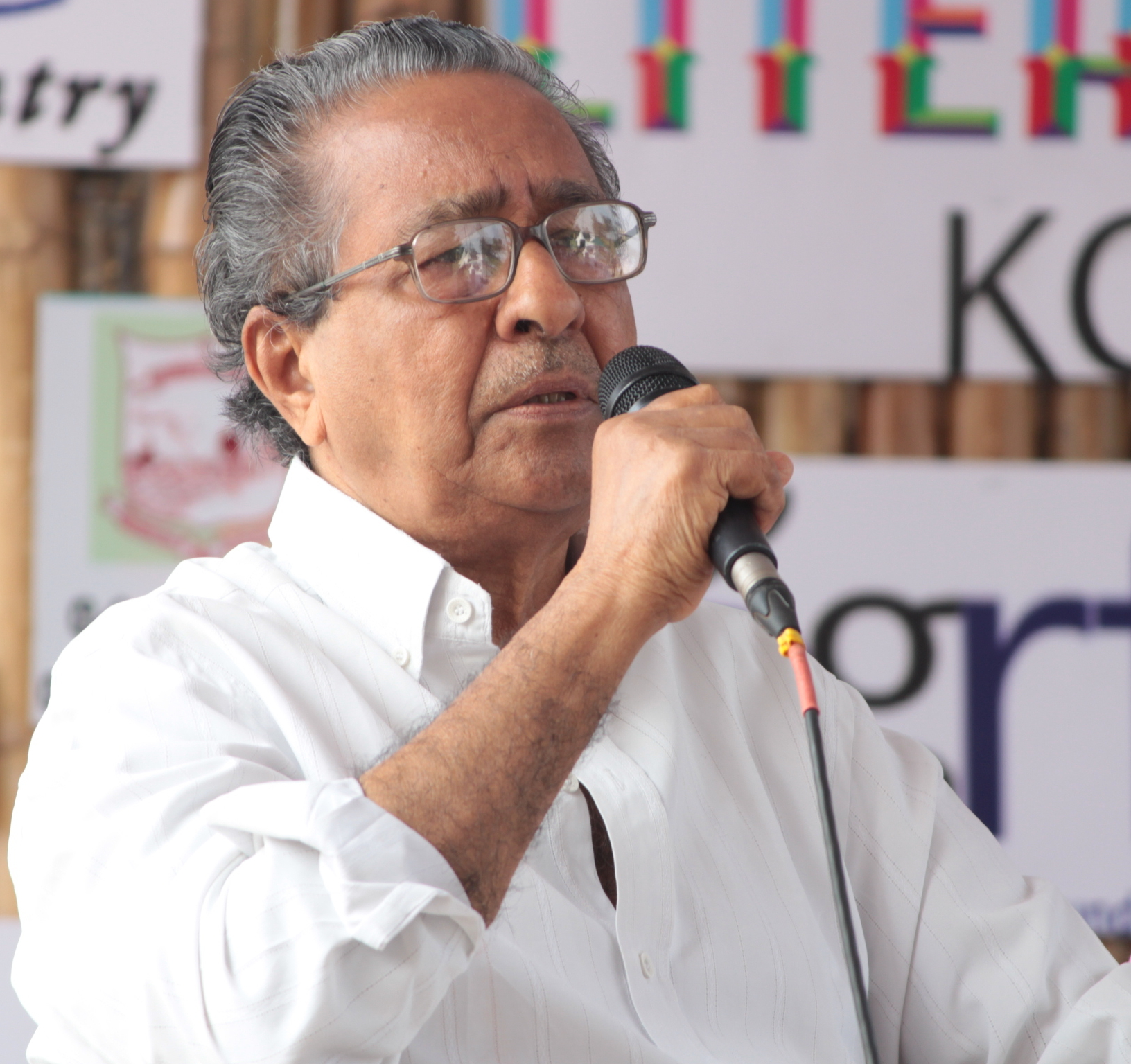

M. M. Basheer is a Malayalam literary critic who has written more than forty critical works on Malayalam poetry, short stories and novels. He has also been awarded the Sahitya Akademi Award Fellowship of 2022.

== Life ==
M M Basheer was set to write a series of newspaper columns on the Ramayana in the Malayalam daily Mathrubhumi from August. Basheer’s series on Ramayana has been a regular feature during the Malayalam month of Karkidakam which is observed as ‘Ramayana month’. His work Thiricharivukal received the Abu Dhabi Sakthi Award for Literary Criticism (Thayat Award) in 2014. In 2022, he received the Kerala Sahitya Akademi Fellowship.

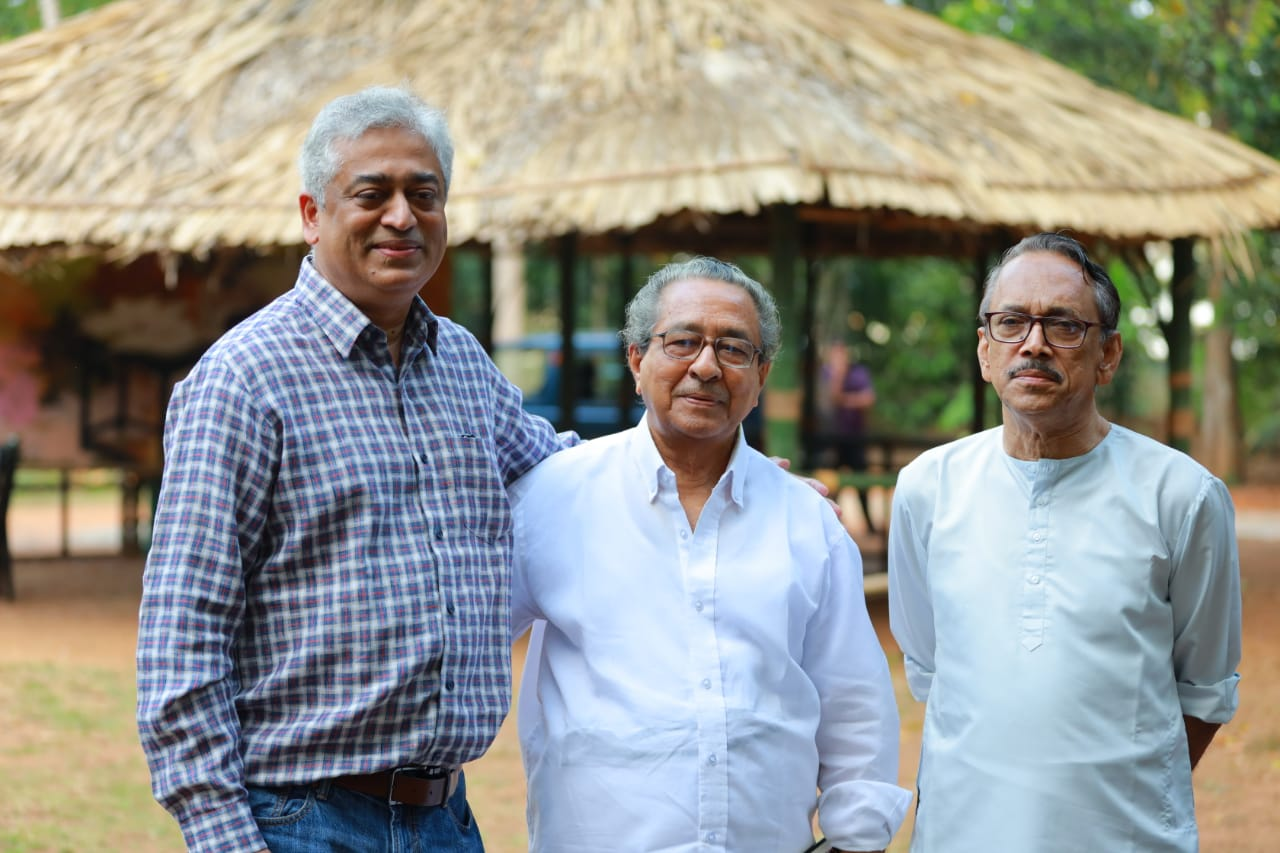
