= George Irumbayam =

Indian literary critic and literature researcher

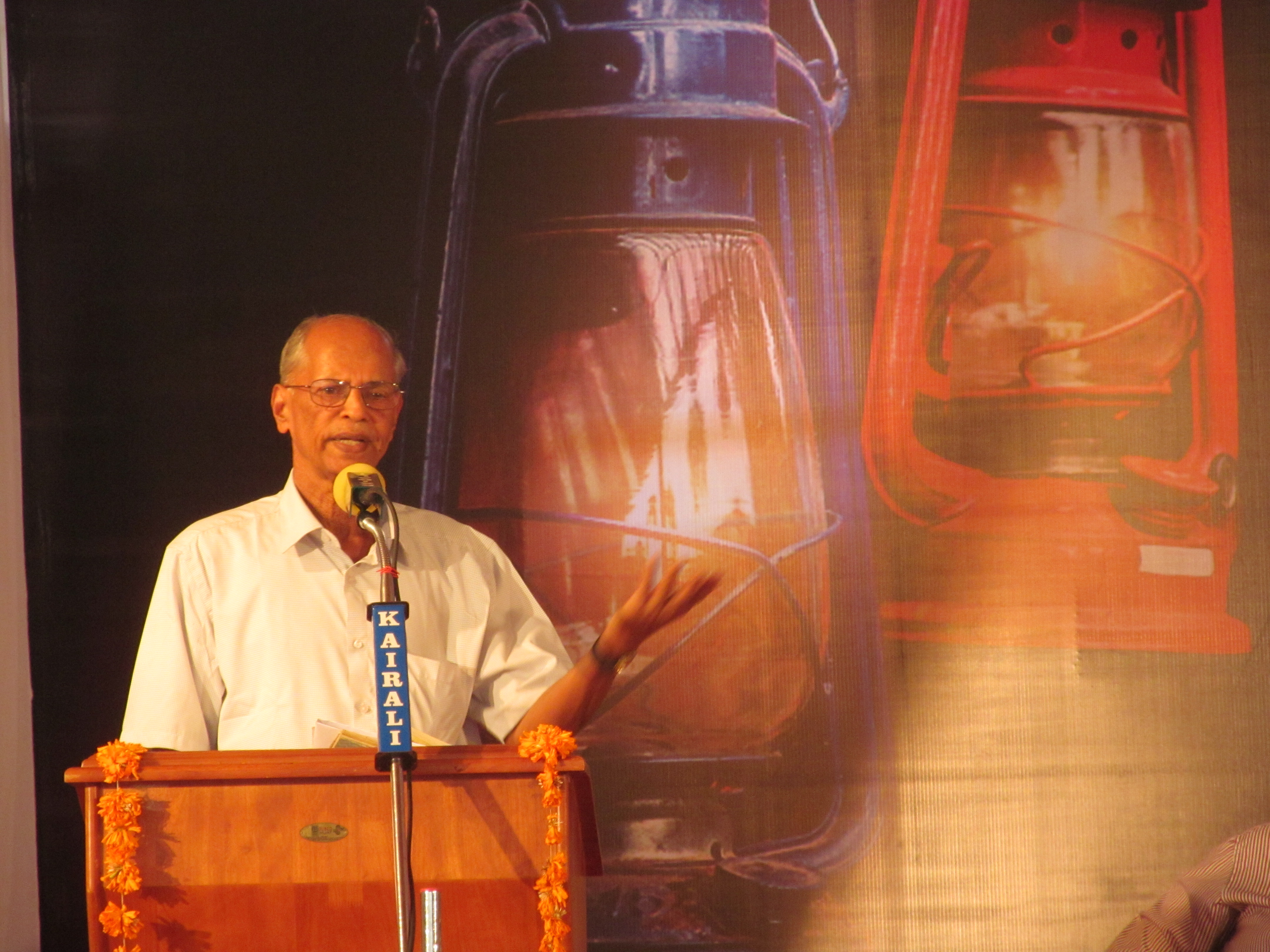
- Born: 19 December 1938 (age 87)
- Occupations: Literary critic; researcher
- Writing career
- Language: Malayalam

George Irumbayam is an Indian literary critic and literature researcher. Author of 39 literary and 7 spiritual books.

== Early life ==
He was born on 19 December 1938 as the eldest child of Irumbayam Poovathunkal Varkey and Annamma, who totally had four children. He studied in the Kaarikkodu-Pothi-Thalayolapparambu schools between 1945 and 1956, and at St. Thomas College Pala from 1956 to 1957. He also studied at Sacred heart college Thevara (1958-1961), University college, Trivandrum (1961-1962) and at aMaharajas College (1962-1963). He received his Masters from Kerala University for Malayalam and English, and the Masters Gandhism from Madhura university, Ph.D from Calicut university, and passed B.A. and M.A. with first rank.

== Career ==
George worked as the president of the Malayalam Protection Council (Malayala Samrakshana Vaedi) from 1989 onwards

He got T.K.Joseph gold medal for first rank in BA and Dr. Godavarma award for first rank in MA (Malayalam). Then he became a Malayalam college lecturer in 1963 at Sacred heart college, Thevara and from 1966 onwards in Government colleges at Madappally, Kozhikode, Palakkad and as professor at Thalassery, Calicut. He retired from Ernakulam Maharaja's as head of department in 1994 after his start there in 1986.

He edited novels and wrote many literary criticism books. He was a member of the editors' committee of periodicals such as Kerala digest, Kolaya, Sahithya Niroopanam and the Keralsamskara. He served as president of Calicut Book Club. He was a member of many government -university committees and academic councils. Gaandhi's autobiography was translated into Malayalam by George Irumbayam, which sold over 400,000 copies in 4 years. Also, he has translated one of the Sherlock Holmes books. He has written and published many spiritual books as well.

== Personal life ==
George is married to Theresa Valavi, and he has three children - Two sons named Jaison and Jesus, and a daughter named Sindhu. The couple live in Kochi.

== See also ==
- Cherupaithangal
