= V. Anandakuttan Nair =

Indian writer, linguist and academic

- Born: 2 March 1920; Thirunakkara, Travancore
- Died: 1 February 2000 (aged 79)
- Occupation(s): Writer, linguist, academic
- Parents: Achuthan Pillai; Nanikkutty Amma
- Awards: Kerala Sahitya Akademi Award for Overall Contributions

V. Anandakuttan Nair (2 March 1920 – 1 February 2000) was a Malayalam language writer, linguist and academic from Kerala, India. He got many notable awards including Kerala Sahitya Akademi Award for Overall Contributions. Anandakuttan is best known for his poetic play Chitha.

== Biography ==
V. Anandakuttan Nair was born on 2 March 1920 at Vattaparambil, Thirunakkara, Kottayam district to Nanikutty Amma and Achuthan Pillai.

After graduation, Anandakuttan Nair started his career as a journalist in Thiruvananthapuram. He graduated with honors in 1949 and became a Malayalam lecturer at University College Thiruvananthapuram. In 1953, he started his Ph.D. research in Champu literature, but after a year and a half he stopped is research as he got a job as a research assistant in the Press Commission. After working in Delhi and Chennai, he returned to the University College. As a university college student, he was involved in the running of the newspapers Pauraprabha and Pauradhvani. He later became the editor of Prabodham weekly and published Kuttanadan Weekly. After passing Ph.D. in Malayalam from the University of Madras he worked as professor in various government colleges and retired from service in 1976. While working as college professor he was appointed to the Kerala secretariat on the basis of his language skills. He was appointed to the newly created post of linguist, as a part of the creation of a special section in the Secretariat to intensify the process of making Malayalam the official administrative language of Kerala. In addition to this post, many other posts were created along with it. When he was appointed to the University College Thiruvananthapuram, he resigned from the job at Secretariat. He served as the President of the Sahitya Pravarthaka Sahakarana Sangham and founding vice chairman of Prof. N. Krishna Pillai Foundation. The song Koottukar ninne vilippathenthe from the movie Snehaseema was written by him.

He died on 1 February 2000 at the age of 79.

== Works ==
- Chitha, poetric play
- Aradhana (Meaning: worship)
- Deepavali, poems
- Amruthaanjanam
- Paapikalute Thaazhvara (Meaning: valley of sinners), Stories
- Chiriyum punchiriyum (Meaning: Laugh and smile), (Narrative Articles)
- Kadalasu manthri (Meaning: Paper Minister)
- Mullukal(Meaning: Thorns)
- Bhava saurabham, Essays
- Ashareeri, Plays
- Veluthampi Dalava, based on life of Veluthampi Dalava
- Jnanappana, Children's literature
- Sri buddhan, based on life of Buddha, Children's literature
- Sree Narayana Guru, based on life of Narayana Guru, Children's literature
- Jayaprakash Narayanan, based on life of Jayaprakash Narayan
- Pathumuthal nalu vare (Meaning: Ten to four), Play
- Anandakkuttante thiranjedutha kruthikal (Selected works of Anandakuttan)
- Kerala bhasha ganangal (Meaning: Kerala Language Songs) 2 Volumes, Edited by him
- Sindhi Sahithya Charithram, Translation of History of Sindhi literature

== Awards and honors ==
- Distinguished Membership of the Kerala Sahitya Akademi
- Kerala Sahitya Akademi Award for Overall Contributions, 1997
- Bheema Smaraka Baala Sahitya Award in children's literature
- Fellowship of the Central Department of Culture
- State Children's Literature Institute Award (1995)
