= List of works related to Marthandavarma (novel) =

This list of reference sources provides an overview of notable works related to the historical novel, Marthandavarma on various media; that are used or not used but referred or used and removed as citation sources in the main article page and in the pages about allusions and characters.

== Bibliography ==
Scripted sources that are referred for citations are under primary, secondary, tertiary sections, where as the quaternary section consists of reference sources that are primarily used to validate the credibility of authors of works mentioned in the first three sections.

=== Primary ===
==== Source Novel ====
- Pillai, C. V. Raman (1983) [1891]. Māṟttāṇḍavaṟmma മാർത്താണ്ഡവർമ്മ [Marthandavarma] (in Malayalam). Kottayam: Little Prince Publications.
- Pillai, C. V. Raman (1983) [1891]. Māṟttāṇḍavaṟmma മാർത്താണ്ഡവർമ്മ [Marthandavarma] (in Malayalam). Kozhikode: Poorna Publications.
- Pillai, C. V. Raman (2009) [1891]. Māṟttāṇḍavaṟmma മാർത്താണ്ഡവർമ്മ [Marthandavarma] (in Malayalam) (Fourth ed.). Kozhikode: Poorna Publications.
- Pillai, C.V. Raman (1973) [1891]. Māṟttāṇḍavaṟmma മാർത്താണ്ഡവർമ്മ [Marthandavarma] (in Malayalam). Kottayam: Sahitya Pravarthaka Co-operative Society Ltd.
- Pillai, C.V. Raman (1991) [1891]. Māṟttāṇḍavaṟmma മാർത്താണ്ഡവർമ്മ [Marthandavarma] (in Malayalam). Kottayam: Sahitya Pravarthaka Co-operative Society Ltd.
- Pillai, C. V. Raman (1992) [1891]. Māṟttāṇḍavaṟmma മാർത്താണ്ഡവർമ്മ [Marthandavarma] (in Malayalam) (Definitive Variorum ed.). Kottayam: D. C. Books. ISBN 8171301304.
- Pillai, C. V. Raman (2009) [1891]. Māṟttāṇḍavaṟmma മാർത്താണ്ഡവർമ്മ [Marthandavarma] (in Malayalam) (Definitive Variorum Revised ed.). Kottayam: D. C. Books. ISBN 978-8171301300.
- Pillai, C. V. Raman (1999) [1891]. Māṟttāṇḍavaṟmma മാർത്താണ്ഡവർമ്മ [Marthandavarma] (in Malayalam). Thrissur: Kerala Sahitya Akademi. ISBN 8176900001.
- Pillai, C. V. Raman (2009) [1891]. Māṟttāṇḍavaṟmma മാർത്താണ്ഡവർമ്മ [Marthandavarma]. Malayalam Classics (in Malayalam). Kollam: Rachana Books.
- Pillai, C. V. Raman (2013) [1891]. Māṟttāṇḍavaṟmma മാർത്താണ്ഡവർമ്മ [Marthandavarma]. Nōval Paḻama (in Malayalam). Thiruvananthapuram: Chintha Publishers.
- Pillai, C. V. Raman (2010) [1891–1919]. Si. Vi. Rāmanpiḷḷāyuṭe Caritrākhyāyikakaḷ Sampūṟṇṇaṁ സി. വി. രാമൻപിള്ളയുടെ ചരിത്രാഖ്യായികകൾ സമ്പൂർണ്ണം [C. V. Raman Pilla's Complete Historical Narratives] (in Malayalam) (first ed.). Kottayam: D. C. Books. ISBN 9788126427970.
- Pillai, C. V. Raman (1994) [1913]. Dhaṟmarājā ധർമ്മരാജാ [Dharmaraja] (in Malayalam). Kottayam: Sahitya Pravarthaka Co-operative Society Ltd.
- Pillai, C. V. Raman (2009) [1918–1919]. Rāmarājābahadūṟ രാമരാജാബഹദൂർ [Ramarajabahadur] (in Malayalam). Kottayam: Sahitya Pravarthaka Co-operative Society Ltd.

==== Translation ====
- Pillai, O. Krishna (1954). Mārttāṇṭa Varma மார்த்தாண்ட வர்மா [Marthandavarma] (in Tamil). Trivandrum: Kamalalaya Book Depot.
- Menon, B.K (1936). Marthanda Varma (First ed.). Trivandrum: Kamalalaya Book Depot.
- Menon, B.K (1998) [1936]. Marthanda Varma (Revised ed.). New Delhi: Sahitya Akademi. ISBN 9788126004683.
- Devi, R. Leela (1984) [1979]. Marthanda varma (Second ed.). New Delhi: Sterling Paperbacks. ISBN 9780865782419.
- Krishnankutty, Kunnukuzhy (1990). "Mārtāṇḍa Varma" मार्ताण्ड वर्मा [Marthandavarma]. Keral Jyoti (in Hindi). XXV (3). Thiruvananthapuram: Kerala Hindi Prachar Sabha.
- Thambi, P. Padmanabhan (2007). Mārttāṇṭa Varmma மார்த்தாண்ட வர்ம்மா [Marthandavarma] (in Tamil). New Delhi: Sahitya Akademi. ISBN 978-8126016587.

==== Abridgement ====
- Janardhanan, Kannan (1964). Māṟttāṇḍavaṟmma മാർത്താണ്ഡവർമ്മ [Marthandavarma] (in Malayalam) (Abrid. ed.). Thiruvananthapuram: Kamalalaya Book Depot.
- Janardhanan, Kannan (1968). Dhaṟmarājā ധർമ്മരാജാ [Dharmaraja] (in Malayalam) (Abrid. ed.). Thiruvananthapuram: Kamalalaya Book Depot.
- Basheer, Dr. M. M. (1984). Kuṭṭikaḷuṭe Māṟttāṇḍavaṟmma കുട്ടികളുടെ മാർത്താണ്ഡവർമ്മ [Children's Marthandavarma]. Children's Literature (in Malayalam). Thiruvananthapuram: C. V. Raman Pillai National Foundation.
- Nair, Prof. P. Ramachandran (2011). Māṟttāṇḍavaṟmma മാർത്താണ്ഡവർമ്മ [Marthandavarma]. Punarākhyānaparampara (in Malayalam) (Children's Literature ed.). Kottayam: D. C. Books. ISBN 9788126429806.
- Ramachandran, Dr. V. (2012). Māṟttāṇḍavaṟmma മാർത്താണ്ഡവർമ്മ [Marthandavarma] (in Malayalam) (Abridged Novel ed.). Kottayam: Dr. V. Ramachandran.

==== Comics ====
- Radha Nair (w), M. Mohandas, Ramesh Umrotkar (a), Anant Pai (ed). "A Historical Romance from Kerala" The Legend of Maarthaanda Varma, no. 346 (December 1985). Bombay: IBH Publishers Pvt. Ltd.

- Radha Nair (w), M. Mohandas, Ramesh Umrotkar (a), Anant Pai (ed). "A Romantic Legend from Kerala" Maarthaanda Varma, vol. 813 (December 2010). Mumbai: Amar Chitra Katha Pvt. Ltd.
- Radha Nair (w), M. Mohandas, Ramesh Umrotkar (a), Anant Pai (ed). "മാർത്താണ്ഡവർമ്മ [māṟttāṇḍavaṟmma]" Balarama Amar Chithra Katha, vol. XVII, no. 6 (September 2007).

==== Textbook ====
- "സി. വി. യുടെ മാനസപുത്രി [Daughter of CV's Mind]". Kēraḷa Pāṭhāvali കേരള പാഠാവലി [Kerala Reader]. Standard X (in Malayalam). Thiruvananthapuram: SCERT, Govt. of Kerala. 1997 [1988].
- Māṟttāṇḍavaṟmma Upapāṭhapustakaṁ മാർത്താണ്ഡവർമ്മ ഉപപാഠപുസ്തകം [Marthandavarma Sub-textbook]. Standard IX (in Malayalam). Thiruvananthapuram: SCERT, Govt. of Kerala. 1985 [1977].

=== Secondary ===
==== History ====
- Menon, P. Shangoony (1998) [1879]. History of Travancore from the Earliest Times. New Delhi: Asian Educational Services.
- Aiya, V. Nagam (1999) [1906]. The Travancore State Manual. Vol. I. Thiruvananthapuram: Kerala Gazetteers Department, Govt. of Kerala.
- Pillay, Nanoo (1886). "The Sketch of Progress of Travancore". In Elenkath, K. R. (ed.). (Dewan Nanoo Pillay 1974).
- Kunju, Dr. A.P. Ibrahim (2005) [1990]. Māṟttāṇḍavaṟmma: Ādhunika Tiruvitāṁkūṟinṟe Udayaṁ മാർത്താണ്ഡവർമ്മ: ആധുനിക തിരുവിതാംകൂറിന്റെ ഉദയം [Marthanda Varma : Rise of Modern Travancore] (in Malayalam). Thiruvananthapuram: Cultural Publications Department, Govt. of Kerala.
- Kunju, Dr. A. P. Ibrahim (1976). Rise of Travancore: A Study of life and times of Marthanda Varma. Trivandrum: Kerala Historical Society.
- Pillai, T.K. Velu (1996) [1940]. The Travancore State Manual. Vol. II. Thiruvananthapuram: Kerala Gazetteers Department, Govt. of Kerala.

- (Anonymous authors) (1996) [1375–1872]. Pillai, T.K. Velu (ed.). The Travancore State Manual (in Malayalam). Vol. II. (Historical Documents).

- Moothathu, Vaikkath Pachu (1986) [1867]. Tiruvitāṁkūṟ Caritraṁ തിരുവിതാംകൂർ ചരിത്രം [Travancore History] (in Malayalam). Kochi: Prathibha Publications.
- Varatharajan, K. P. (2000). Tiruvaṭi Tēcaṁ Tiruppāppūr Paramparai Śrīmat Aṉantapatmanāpaṉ Nāṭār Varalāṟu திருவடி தேசம் திருப்பாப்பூர் பரம்பரை மாவீரன் ஶ்ரீமத் அனந்தபத்மநாபன் நாடார் வரலாறு [History of great hero Mr. Ananthapadmanabhan Nadar in Thripappur lineage of Thiruvati nation] (in Tamil). Kattathurai: Ananthapadmanabhan Trust.
- Kareem, C. K. (2012) [1973]. Tiruvitāṁkūṟ Caritraṁ തിരുവിതാംകൂർ ചരിത്രം [Travancore History] (in Malayalam). Thiruvananthapuram: State Institute of Languages. ISBN 9788176380744. Translation of (History of Travancore 1879)
- Immanuel, Dr. M. (2007). "A Forgotten Hero". Kanniyakumari: Aspects and Architects. Nagercoil: Historical Research and Publications Trust.
- Immanuel, Dr. M.; Sarveswaran, Dr. P., eds. (2011). Māvīraṉ Taḷapati Aṉantapatmanāpaṉ மாவீரன் தளபதி அனந்தபத்மநாபன் [Great Commander Ananthapadmanabhan] (in Tamil). Nagercoil: Cultural Historical Linguistic Indigenous Research Organisation, India.

- Radhakrishnan, R. (2011). Tiruvaṭi Paramparaiyil Utitta Māvīraṉ திருவடி பரம்பரையில் உதித்த மாவீரன் [Hero emerged in the Thiruvati Lineage] (in Tamil).
- Parthan (2011). Anantapadmanābhan Nāṭāruṁ Tiruvilāṁkūṟ Niṟmmitiyuṁ അനന്തപത്മനാഭൻ നാടാരും തിരുവിതാംകൂർ നിർമ്മിതിയും [Ananthapadmanabhan Nadar and Travancore formation] (in Malayalam).
- Shobhanan, Dr. B. (2011). A Note on Ananthapadmanabhan.

- Janarthanan, M. (June 2008). A History of Nayars of South Travancore (Ph.D.). Tirunelveli: Manonmaniam Sundaranar University.
- Pazhani, Dr. T. (2003). Social Change among the Vellalas of Nanchinad. Aluva: Pen Books.

==== Literary study ====
- Definitive Variorum (2009)

- Pilla, Prof. N. Krishna; Nair, Prof. V. Anandakkuttan (1983). Māṟttāṇḍavaṟmma: Caritravuṁ Kalpanayuṁ മാർത്താണ്ഡവർമ്മ: ചരിത്രവും കല്പനയും [Marthandavarma: History and Figment] (in Malayalam).
- Pilla, Prof. N. Krishna; Nair, Prof. V. Anandakkuttan (1983). Kathākālaṁ; saṁbhavasthalaṅṅaḷ കഥാകാലം; സംഭവസ്ഥലങ്ങൾ [Timeline of story; Incident locations] (in Malayalam).
- Pilla, Dr. K. Raghavan (1983). Si Vi yuṭe Caritrākhyāyikakaḷkk Orāmukhaṁ സി വി യുടെ ചരിത്രാഖ്യായികകൾക്ക് ഒരാമുഖം [An Introduction to CV's Historical Narratives] (in Malayalam).
- Venugopalan, Dr. P. (1992). Māṟttāṇḍavaṟmma: Sr̥ṣṭiyuṁ svarūpavuṁ മാർത്താണ്ഡവർമ്മ: സൃഷ്ടിയും സ്വരൂപവും [Marthandavarma: Creation and Formation] (in Malayalam).
- Venugopalan, Dr. P. (1992). Sūcitasāhityakr̥tikaḷ – Oru paṭhanaṁ സൂചിതസാഹിത്യകൃതികൾ - ഒരു പഠനം [Referred Literary works – A study] (in Malayalam).
- Venugopalan, Dr. P. (1992). Vyākhyānakkuṟippukaḷ വ്യാഖ്യാനക്കുറിപ്പുകൾ [Explanatory notes] (in Malayalam).
- Kizhakemuri, D C (1992). Pṟasādhakakkuṟipp പ്രസാധകക്കുറിപ്പ് [Publishers' Note] (in Malayalam).
- Paniker, Dr. Ayyappa (1992). Śatābdi praśasti ശതാബ്ദി പ്രശസ്തി [Centenary Fame] (in Malayalam).

- Pilla, Prof. N. Krishna (2011) [1986]. Pratipātraṁ Bhāṣaṇabhēdaṁ പ്രതിപാത്രം ഭാഷണഭേദം [Speech variance per character] (in Malayalam) (2^{nd} DCB ed.). Kottayam: D. C. Books. ISBN 978-8171303946.
- Pilla, Prof. N. Krishna (2010) [1958]. Kairaḷiyuṭe Katha കൈരളിയുടെ കഥ [Story of Kairali] (in Malayalam). Kottayam: D. C. Books. ISBN 978-8126405091.
- Paul, M. P. (1991) [1930]. Nōvalsāhityaṁ നോവൽസാഹിത്യം [Novel Literature] (in Malayalam) (First Poorna ed.). Kozhikode: Poorna Publications.
- Krishnan, K. S. (1991) [1988]. Si. Vi. Caritrākhyāyikakaḷilūṭe സി. വി. ചരിത്രാഖ്യായികകളിലൂടെ [C. V., through the Historical Narratives] (in Malayalam). Kottayam: Sahitya Pravarthaka Co-operative Society Ltd.
- Krishnan, K. S. (1993). Si Vi yuṭe mūnnu kathāpātraṅṅaḷ സി വി യുടെ മൂന്നു കഥാപാത്രങ്ങൾ [C.V's three characters] (in Malayalam) (First ed.). Kottayam: Sahitya Pravarthaka Co-operative Society Ltd.
- Irumbayam, Dr. George (2010) [1982]. Ādyakāla Malayāḷanōval ആദ്യകാല മലയാളനോവൽ [Early Malayalam Novel] (in Malayalam). Kottayam: Sahitya Pravarthaka Co-operative Society Ltd.
- Irumbayam, Dr. George (1997) [1984]. Malayāḷanōval Pattompatāṁ Nūṯāṇṭil മലയാളനോവൽ പത്തൊമ്പതാം നൂറ്റാണ്ടിൽ [Malayalam Novel in Nineteenth Century] (in Malayalam). Thiruvananthapuram: Cultural Publications Department, Govt. of Kerala.
- Irumbayam, Dr. George (2009) [1996]. Nōval Si.Vi. Mutal Baṣīṟ Vare നോവൽ സി. വി. മുതൽ ബഷീർ വരെ [Novel : From C. V. until Basheer] (in Malayalam). Thrissur: Kerala Sahitya Akademi.
- Irumbayam, Dr. George (July 1981). "Indian Literature". Treasures of Malayalam Literature from Europe. 24 (4). New Delhi: Sahitya Akademi.
- Nair, S. Guptan (2001). "മാർത്താണ്ഡവർമ്മയും സി.വി. യും [Marthandavarma and C.V.]". Gadyaṁ Pinniṭṭa Vaḻikaḷ ഗദ്യം പിന്നിട്ട വഴികൾ [Paths passed by prose] (in Malayalam). Kottayam: D. C. Books.
- Devi, R. Leela (1978). Influence of English on Malayalam Novels. Trivandrum: College Book House.
- Balakrishnan, Dr. Kalpatta (2005) [1986]. Caritranōval Malayāḷattil ചരിത്രനോവൽ മലയാളത്തിൽ [Historical Novel in Malayalam] (in Malayalam). Thrissur: Kerala Sahitya Akademi. ISBN 8176900869.
- Pillai, Dr. P. V. Velayudhan (2000). Āṇuṅṅaḷillātta Koṟa Valyakoṟa (Si.vi nōvalukaḷ oru punaṟvāyana) ആണുങ്ങളില്ലാത്ത കൊറ വല്യകൊറ (സി.വി. നോവലുകൾ ഒരു പുനർവായന) [Scarcity of Men is a major exiguity (C. V. Novels, a re-reading)] (in Malayalam). Thiruvananthapuram: Prabhatham Printing and Publishing Co.
- Pillai, Dr. A. M. Vasudevan (1991). "സി. വി. രാമൻപിള്ളയുടെ രാഷ്ട്രീയ നോവലുകൾ [Political novels of C. V. Raman Pillai]". Nōvaluṁ Rāṣṭṟīyavuṁ നോവലും രാഷ്ട്രീയവും [Novel and Politics] (in Malayalam). Thrissur: Kerala Sahitya Akademi.
- Thomas, Prof. Thumpamon (1992). "മാർത്താണ്ഡവർമ്മയിലൂടെ [Through Marthandavarma]". Malayāḷanōvalil Oru Punḥapariśōdhana മലയാളനോവലിൽ ഒരു പുനഃപരിശോധന [A Re-examination in Malayalam Novel] (in Malayalam). Kottayam: Sahitya Pravarthaka Co-operative Society Ltd.
- Tharakan, Prof. K. M. (2005) [1978]. Malayāḷa Nōval Sāhitya Caritṟaṁ മലയാള നോവൽ സാഹിത്യ ചരിത്രം [History of Malayalam Novel Literature] (in Malayalam). Thrissur: Kerala Sahitya Akademi. ISBN 8176900788.
- Onakkoor, Dr. George (2013). Nāyaka Sankalpaṁ Malayāḷa Nōvalil നായക സങ്കല്പം മലയാള നോവലിൽ [Concept of Hero in Malayalam Novel] (in Malayalam). Kottayam: Ascend Publication.
- Nair, Prof. Panmana Ramachandran Nair, ed. (2013). Si. Vi. Paṭhanaṅṅaḷ സി. വി. പഠനങ്ങൾ [C. V. Studies] (in Malayalam). Thiruvananthapuram: P. K. Parameswaran Nair Memorial Trust. ISBN 9788124019566.

- Nair, Dr. Poojapura Krishnan. Rasāviṣkaraṇaṁ si.vi. nōvalukaḷil രസാവിഷ്കരണം സി.വി.നോവലുകളിൽ [Representation of themes in C. V. Novels] (in Malayalam).
- Nair I. A. S, R. Ramachandran. Rājanītiyuṁ pṟajādhaṟmmavuṁ രാജനീതിയും പ്രജാധർമ്മവും [Royal policies and populous ethics] (in Malayalam).
- Benjamin, Dr. D. Dēśacaritṟaṁ si.vi.yuṭe nōvalukaḷil ദേശചരിത്രം സി.വി.യുടെ നോവലുകളിൽ [Locality history in C.V.'s novels] (in Malayalam).

- Benjamin, Dr. D. (2010) [1994]. Nōvalsāhityapaṭhanaṅṅaḷ നോവൽസാഹിത്യപഠനങ്ങൾ [Novel literature studies] (in Malayalam). Thiruvananthapuram: MaluBen Publications. ISBN 9788187480655.
- Kurup, C. Sreekanta (2007). Si. Vi. Manasuṁ Kalayuṁ സി.വി. മനസ്സും കലയും [C.V. Mind and Art] (in Malayalam). Kottayam: The Book Digest.
- Prabodhachandran, Dr. V. R. (2003). "സീ വീ ശൈലി [C V Style]". Śailībhaṁgikaḷ ശൈലീഭംഗികൾ [Style-charms] (in Malayalam). Thiruvananthapuram: State Institute of Languages.
- Das, Sisir Kumar (2005) [1991]. A History of Indian Literature: 1800-1910, Western Impact: Indian Responses. Vol. 8 (Reprint ed.). New Delhi: Sahitya Akademi. ISBN 9788172010065.
- Das, Sisir Kumar (2006) [1995]. A History of Indian Literature: 1911-1956, Struggle for Freedom : Triumph and Tragedy. Vol. II. New Delhi: Sahitya Akademi. ISBN 9788172017989.
- Haridevan. Bhūmika ഭൂമിക [Prelude] (in Malayalam). (Poorna Edition 2009).
- Thekkummoodu, Dr. B. Balanandan (2010). "സി.വി.രാമൻപിള്ളയുടെ നോവൽത്രയം [C. V. Raman Pillai's Novel Trilogy]". Saṟggātmakatayuṭe Śṟutibhēdaṅṅaḷ സർഗ്ഗാത്മകതയുടെ ശ്രുതിഭേദങ്ങൾ [Sough Variations of Creativity] (in Malayalam). Thiruvananthapuram: Souparnika Publication.
- Lal, Mohan, ed. (2001) [1992]. Encyclopaedia of Indian Literature: Sasay to Zorgot. Vol. V. New Delhi: Sahitya Akademi. ISBN 8126012218.
- Jayakumar, Prema. Foreword. (English Translation 1998).
- Nair, P. K. Parameswaran (2010) [1958]. Malayāḷa sahityacaritraṁ മലയാള സാഹിത്യചരിത്രം [Malayalam literary history] (in Malayalam) (12^{th} ed.). New Delhi: Sahitya Akademi.
- George, K. M. (1998) [1972]. Western Influence on Malayalam Language and Literature. New Delhi: Sahitya Akademi. ISBN 9788126004133.

==== Biography ====
- Nair, P. K. Parameswaran (1959) [1948]. Si. Vi. Rāman Piḷḷa സി. വി. രാമൻ പിള്ള [C. V. Raman Pillai] (in Malayalam). Thriuvananthapuram: Kerala Sahithya Sahakarana Sangham.
- Nair, P. K. Parameswaran (2014) [1948]. Si. Vi. Rāman Piḷḷa സി. വി. രാമൻ പിള്ള [C. V. Raman Pillai] (in Malayalam). Thrissur: Kerala Sahitya Akademi.
- Nair, N. Balakrishnan (1951). Sākṣāl Si. Vi സാക്ഷാൽ സി. വി. [Real C. V.] (in Malayalam). Thiruvananthapuram: Kamalalaya Printing Works & Book Depot.
- Paniker, Dr. Ayyappa (1993). Si. Vi. Rāman Piḷḷa സി. വി. രാമൻ പിള്ള [C. V. Raman Pillai]. Malalyalam Men of Letters (in Malayalam). Thiruvananthapuram: Dept. of Publications, University of Kerala.
- Nair, S. Guptan (1992). C. V. Raman Pillai (First ed.). New Delhi: Sahitya Akademi.

- (Unknown reporter) (1992) [1891]. Nair, S. Guptan (ed.). Appendix I: Editorial from The Hindu, dated 21 December 1891.

- Pilla, K. R. Parameswaran (1921). "Si. Vi. Rāmanpiḷḷa Avaṟkaḷuṭe Nōvaleḻuttŭ" സി. വി. രാമൻപിള്ള അവർകളുടെ നോവലെഴുത്ത് [The novel scripting of respected C. V. Raman Pillai]. Ātmapōṣiṇi (in Malayalam). XI (9). Kunnamkulam: Akshara Ratna Prakasika.
- Gopalakrishnan, Malayankeezh (2007). Ji. Pi. Piḷḷa Mahātmagāndhikk Māṟgadaṟśiyāya Malayāḷi ജി. പി. പിള്ള മഹാത്മാഗാന്ധിക്ക് മാർഗദർശിയായ മലയാളി [G. P. Pillai : Malayali guidance to Mahatma Gandhi] (in Malayalam). Thriruvananthapuram: Information & Public Relations Department, Govt. of Kerala.
- Jeffrey, Robin (2014) [1976]. The Decline of Nair Dominance: Society and Politics in Travancore, 1847-1908. New Delhi: Manohar Publishers & Distributors. ISBN 9789350980347.
- Elenkath, K. R. (1974). Dewan Nanoo Pillay Biography with his select writings and letters. Neyyoor-West: Dewan Nanoo Pillay Memorial Reading Room.
- Nair, Perunna K. N. (1984). "കുളക്കുന്നത്തു രാമമേനോൻ [Kulakkunnathu Raman Menon]". In Warrier, P. A.; Kizhakemuri, D. C. (eds.). Kuḷakkunnattu Rāmamēnōn Māḷiyammāvu Kuññuvaṟīt Es. Ṭi. Ṟeḍyāṟ E. Ke. Ṭi. Ke. Eṁ Tōmas Pōḷ Eṁ. Je. Tōmas കുളക്കുന്നത്തു രാമമേനോൻ മാളിയമ്മാവു കുഞ്ഞുവറീത് എസ്. ടി. റെഡ്യാർ എ. കെ. ടി. കെ. എം. തോമസ് പോൾ എം. ജെ. തോമസ് [Biographies of Kulakkunnathu Raman Menon, Maliyammavu Kunjuvareethu, S. T. Reddiar, A. K. T. K. M. Vasudevan Namboothiripad, Thomas Paul, M. J. Thomas]. Mahacharithamaala (in Malayalam). Kottayam: Kairali Childrens Book Trust.

==== Ballads and legends ====
- Padmakumari, Prof. J.; Hussain, K.B.M, eds. (2003). Valiyatampi Kuñcutampi Katha വലിയതമ്പി കുഞ്ചുതമ്പി കഥ [Big Brother Small Brother Story] (in Malayalam). Thiruvananthapuram: State Institute of Languages.
- Padmakumari, Prof. J., ed. (2009). Tekkan Pāṭṭukaḷ : Pāṭhavuṁ Paṭhanavuṁ തെക്കൻ പാട്ടുകൾ : പാഠവും പഠനവും [Southern Ballads : Text and Study] (in Malayalam). Thrissur: Kerala Sahitya Akademi.
- Sarveswaran, Dr. P., ed. (1982). Ōṭṭaṉ Katai ஓட்டன் கதை [Runner Tale] (in Tamil). Madurai: Mano Publishers.
- Natarajan, T.; Sarveswaran, P., eds. (2001). Tampimār Katai தம்பிமார் கதை [Brothers Story] (in Tamil). Madurai: Madurai Kamaraj University.
- Gopalakrishnan, Dr. Naduvattom (2008). "പെരുങ്കടവിള ഈഴക്കുടി [Ezhava house at Perunkadavila]". Nāṭōṭi Caritrakkathakaḷ നാടോടി ചരിത്രക്കഥകൾ [Folk historical stories] (in Malayalam). Thiruvananthapuram: Malu Ben Publications.
- Pilla, P. Govinda, ed. (1917). Malayāḷattile Paḻaya Pāṭṭukaḷ മലയാളത്തിലെ പഴയ പാട്ടുകൾ [Old songs in Malayalam] (in Malayalam). Thiruvananthapuram: Vidyavilasa Prasideekaranashala.
- Gangadharan, Dr. Thikkurissi, ed. (2011). Iravikkuṭṭippiḷḷappōr Oru Pṭhanaṁ ഇരവിക്കുട്ടിപ്പിള്ളപ്പോര് ഒരു പഠനം [Fight of Ravikutty Pillai : A study] (in Malayalam). Thriruvananthapuram: Sahithya Kairali Publications.
- Gangadharan, Dr. Thikkurissi (2011). Vēṇāṭinṟe Kthāgānaṅṅaḷ വേണാടിന്റെ കഥാഗാനങ്ങൾ [Ballads of Venad] (in Malayalam). Thriruvananthapuram: Sahithya Kairali Publications.
- Thampi, Dr. G. Thrivikraman (2008). Tekkanpāṭṭukaḷuṁ Vāmoḻippāṭṭukaḷuṁ: Uḷḷorukkaṅṅaḷ Uḷpporuḷukaḷ തെക്കൻപാട്ടുകളും വാമൊഴിപ്പാട്ടുകളും: ഉള്ളൊരുക്കങ്ങൾ ഉൾപ്പൊരുളുകൾ [Southern Ballads and Vernacular Songs: Inner equipments and inner meanings] (in Malayalam). Thiruvananthapuram: Raja Raja Varma Basha Padana Kendram.

==== Geography ====
- Valath, V. V. K. (1998). Kēraḷattile Sthalacaritraṅṅaḷ : Tiruvaṉantapuraṁ Jilla കേരളത്തിലെ സ്ഥലചരിത്രങ്ങൾ : തിരുവനന്തപുരം ജില്ല [Locality histories in Kerala : Thiruvananthapuram district] (in Malayalam). Thrissur: Kerala Sahitya Akademi.

- Pilla, Sooranad Kunjan (1998) [1992]. Valath, V. V. K. (ed.). Kiḻakkē kōṭṭayuṁ paṭiññāṟē kōṭṭayuṁ കിഴക്കേ കോട്ടയും പടിഞ്ഞാറേ കോട്ടയും [East fort and West fort] (in Malayalam).

- Sasibhooshan, Dr. M. G. Peruntachchanṟe baliṣṭhaśilpaṅṅaḷ പെരുന്തച്ചന്റെ ബലിഷ്ഠശില്പങ്ങൾ [Perunthachan's Strong Structures] (in Malayalam). CV Studies (2013).
- Ajithkumar, Dr. N. Janakīyasaṁskāraṁ ജനകീയസംസ്കാരം [Popular Culture] (in Malayalam). CV Studies (2013).

==== Lyrical works ====
- Ezhuthachan, Thunchathu (1999) [1500–1699]. Śrīmahābhārataṁ Strīpaṟvvaṁ ശ്രീമഹാഭാരതം സ്ത്രീപർവ്വം [Great Mahabharat – Lady Section] (in Malayalam) (Fourth ed.). Kottayam: Sahitya Pravarthaka Co-operative Society Ltd.
- Variyar, Unnayi (2003) [1700–1750]. Naḷacaritaṁ (Onnāṁ Divasaṁ) നളചരിതം (ഒന്നാം ദിവസം) [Nalacharitham (1^{st} day)] (in Malayalam) (Fourth ed.). Kottayam: Sahitya Pravarthaka Co-operative Society Ltd.
- Variyar, Unnayi (2001) [1700–1750]. Naḷacaritaṁ (Raṇṭāṁ Divasaṁ) നളചരിതം (രണ്ടാം ദിവസം) [Nalacharitham (2^{nd} day)] (in Malayalam). Kottayam: Sahitya Pravarthaka Co-operative Society Ltd.
- Variyar, Unnayi (2007) [1700–1750]. Naḷacaritaṁ (Mūnnāṁ Divasaṁ) നളചരിതം (മൂന്നാം ദിവസം) [Nalacharitham (3^{rd} day)] (in Malayalam). Kottayam: Sahitya Pravarthaka Co-operative Society Ltd.
- Variyar, Unnayi (2003) [1700–1750]. Naḷacaritaṁ (Nālāṁ Divasaṁ) നളചരിതം (നാലാം ദിവസം) [Nalacharitham (4^{th} day)] (in Malayalam). Kottayam: Sahitya Pravarthaka Co-operative Society Ltd.

==== News ====
- Vijayakumar, B. (7 March 2013). "Metro Plus: Marthanda Varma 1931". The Hindu. Thiruvananthapuram. Archived from the original on 13 April 2014.
- Liza, George (22 October 2010). "Metro Plus: Real to reel". The Hindu. Television. Thiruvananthapuram.
- (Staff Reporter) (18 May 2013). "A classic goes on stage, with its gist intact". The Hindu. National. Thiruvananthapuram. Archived from the original on 31 August 2014.
- (Express News Service) (18 May 2013). "'Marthanda Varma' to be staged in city on Sunday". Thiruvananthapuram: The New Indian Express. Archived from the original on 5 January 2015.
- Shameer (23 May 2013). "Tiruvitāṁkūṟinṟe Caritrarēkhakaḷumāyi Māṟttāṇḍavaṟmma Avatarippiccu" തിരുവിതാംകൂറിന്റെ ചരിത്രരേഖകളുമായി മാർത്താണ്ഡവർമ്മ അവതരിപ്പിച്ചു [Marthanda Varma staged with historical notes of Travancore]. literature (in Malayalam). Thiruvananthapuram: Madhyamam.
- (Staff Reporter) (17 March 2008). "Metro Plus: Anniversary celebrations". The Hindu. Today's Paper. Thiruvananthapuram.
- Remakant, Manu (30 May 2008). "Friday Review" In memory of a maestro". The Hindu. Today's Paper. Thiruvananthapuram.
- Sebastian, Shevlin (5 September 2009). "The write sttuff". Kochi. Kochi: The New Indian Express. Archived from the original on 27 April 2015.
- Muthiah, S (13 August 2003). "Metro Plus: Printers' ink on Mount Road". The Hindu. Stories. Chennai. Archived from the original on 15 November 2017.
- (Staff Reporter) (9 June 2012). "Our archival heritage". The Hindu. Metro Plus. Thiruvananthapuram. Archived from the original on 15 January 2022.

==== Cinema study ====
- Chabria, Suresh, ed. (2013) [1994]. Light of Asia : INDIA SILENT CINEMA 1912-1934 (Expand. ed.). New Delhi: Niyogi Books. ISBN 9789383098026.

==== Theatre study ====
- Nair, Dr. N. Rajan. Si. Vi. nōvalukaḷ araṅṅattŭ സി. വി. നോവലുകൾ അരങ്ങത്ത് [C. V. Novels on Stage] (in Malayalam). CV Studies (2013).

==== Periodicals ====
- Kodampuzha, T. H. (31 March 1996). "Subhadrayuṭe Kumāran" സുഭദ്രയുടെ കുമാരൻ [Subhadra's Kumaran]. Chithrabhumi (in Malayalam). XV (1). Kozhikode: Mathrubhumi Publishing & Printing Company Ltd.
- Kodampuzha, T. H. (12 May 1996). "Rāmanāmaṭhatte Bhayappeṭuttiya Yakṣi" രാമനാമഠത്തെ ഭയപ്പെടുത്തിയ യക്ഷി [The Fairy who scared Ramana Madam]. Chithrabhumi (in Malayalam). XV (7). Kozhikode: Mathrubhumi Publishing & Printing Company Ltd.
- Gangadharan, Dr. Thikkurissi (22 August 2012). Madhusudanan, M. S.; Vellayani, Manju (eds.). "Vēṇāṭṭile Yakṣikaḷ" വേണാട്ടിലെ യക്ഷികൾ [Fairies of Venad]. Kerala Kaumudi Weekily (in Malayalam). XVI (34). Thriruvananthapuram: Kerala Kaumudi.
- Malayilkada, Vinil (1998). "Śuṣkamāya Bhāviyuṁ Selakṭīvāya Kāṇikaḷuṁ" ശുഷ്കമായ ഭാവിയും സെലക്ടീവായ കാണികളും [Dry future and selective viewers]. Chithrabhumi (in Malayalam). XVI (42). Kozhikode: Mathrubhumi Publishing & Printing Company Ltd.
- Mathew, Joshi (1998). "Paricayasampannaṟ Vijayaṁ Koyyunnu" പരിചയസമ്പന്നർ വിജയം കൊയ്യുന്നു [Veterans harvest success]. Rashtra Deepika Cinema (in Malayalam). III (17). Kottayam: Rashtra Deepika Ltd.
- Balakrishnan, K., ed. (2002). "channel page". Rashtra Deepika Cinema (in Malayalam). VIII (26). Kottayam: Rashtra Deepika Ltd. "മാർത്താണ്ഡവർമ [Marthandavarma]"
- Pillai, Rosscote Krishna (2013). Gopalakrishnan, R. (ed.). "My Dear Ayyappaji". Malayalam Literary Survey (12). Thrissur: Kerala Sahitya Akademi.

==== Web ====
- "Introduction". Malayalam Cinema. Thiruvananthapuram: Public Relations Development, Government of Kerala. Archived from the original on 12 April 2014.
- M, Bindu Menon (June 2009). "Romancing history and historicizing romance". Circuits of Cinema: a symposium on Indian cinema in the 1940s and '50s. New Delhi: Seminar: Web Edition.
- "Calacitra caritraṁ" ചലച്ചിത്ര ചരിത്രം [Movie History]. ചലച്ചിത്ര രംഗം [Movie Scene] (in Malayalam). Thiruvananthapuram: Thiruvananthapuram Municipal Corporation. Archived from the original on 9 June 2019.
- Jayakumar, G. (26 January 2006). "Friday Review: The politics of a relationship". The Hindu. Archived from the original on 3 November 2015.
- "Sahithya Pravarthaka Cooperative Society Ltd Vs. Kamalalaya Printing Works And Book Depot". Encyclopedia. Ahmadabad: Regent Computronics Pvt. Ltd. Archived from the original on 21 April 2015.
- "Pṟācīna Kēraḷattinṟe Vipulacaritṟamāyi Oru Nōval" പ്രാചീന കേരളത്തിന്റെ വിപുലചരിത്രമായി ഒരു നോവൽ [A Novel with detail history of ancient Kerala]. Novel (in Malayalam). Kottayam: D. C. Books. 20 November 2013. Archived from the original on 6 December 2013.
- Pallippuram, Sippy (2010). "Oriṭatt Oriṭatt Oru Kuññuṇṇi" ഒരിടത്ത്‌ ഒരിടത്ത്‌ ഒരു കുഞ്ഞുണ്ണി [At one place, At one place A Kunjunni]. puzhakids (in Malayalam). Aluva: Puzha.com. Archived from the original on 24 September 2015.
- "Detailed Syllabus For Ba.Malayalam – Core And Allied Scheme Of Question Papers" (PDF). Minutes Of The Meeting Division Of Syllabus Detailed Syllabus For Foundation Course. Pondicherry: Pondicherry University. 2010. p. 14.

==== Referral ====
- Balakrishnan, Dr. B. C.; Kartha, K. B.; Nair, Prof. Aliam Bhaskaran; Omana, Ms. P. V., eds. (1994). Si. Vi. Vyākhyānakōśaṁ സി. വി. വ്യാഖ്യാനകോശം [C. V. Exegetic Dictionary] (in Malayalam). Vol. I. Thiruvananthapuram: C. V. Raman Pillai National Foundation.
- Balakrishnan, Dr. B. C.; Satheesh, Mrs. P. V. Omana, eds. (1997). Si. Vi. Vyākhyānakōśaṁ സി. വി. വ്യാഖ്യാനകോശം [C. V. Exegetic Dictionary] (in Malayalam). Vol. II. Thiruvananthapuram: C. V. Raman Pillai National Foundation.
- Balakrishnan, Dr. B. C.; Satheesh, Mrs. P. V. Omana, eds. (2002). Si. Vi. Vyākhyānakōśaṁ സി. വി. വ്യാഖ്യാനകോശം [C. V. Exegetic Dictionary] (in Malayalam). Vol. III. Thiruvananthapuram: C. V. Raman Pillai National Foundation.
- Balakrishnan, Dr. B. C.; Satheesh, Mrs. P. V. Omana, eds. (2004). Si. Vi. Vyākhyānakōśaṁ സി. വി. വ്യാഖ്യാനകോശം [C. V. Exegetic Dictionary] (in Malayalam). Vol. IV. Thiruvananthapuram: C. V. Raman Pillai National Foundation.

- Venugopalan, Dr. P. Balakrishnan, Dr. B. C.; Satheesh, Mrs. P. V. Omana (eds.). Anubandhaṁ 3 : Uddharaṇaṅṅaḷ, Ūpādānaṅṅaḷ അനുബന്ധം 3 : ഉദ്ധരണങ്ങൾ, ഉപാദാനങ്ങൾ [Annexure 3 : Quotations, Appropriations] (in Malayalam).

- Vasu, Dr. A. C (2009). "സംഖ്യാനാമം പ്രാചീന അളവുപട്ടിക [Numeric names, Ancient measurement table]". Enṟe Malayāḷaṁ എന്റെ മലയാളം [My Malayalam] (in Malayalam). Thrissur: Kerala Sahitya Akademi.
- Sumathi, G. J. (2004) [2002]. "Some Traditional Textiles of India". Elements of Fashion and Apparel Design. New Delhi: New Age International Publishers.
- Wright, Arnold; Bond, J.W; Playne, Somerset, eds. (2004) [1914–1915]. Southern India its history, people, commerce, and industrial resources (AES Reprint ed.). New Delhi: Asian Educational Services.
- Aiyar, V. Venkatarama (1994) [1939]. The Madras Tercentenary commemoration volume. Madras Tercentenary Celebration Committee (AES Reprint ed.). New Delhi: Asian Educational Services. ISBN 8120605373.

==== Reports ====
- Syamala, C. N. (1 July 2014). No.67(5)/RIACT/AI/DKT/3449 (Report). Thiruvananthapuram: Doordarshan Kendra.
- Sanalkumaran, M. (8 June 2015). SIL/684/Mal/45/15 (Report). Madurai: Madurai Kamaraj University.
- P, Sivappu (6 February 2015). KU/SPIO/RTI/2221-2230 (ii) (Report). Kannur: Kannur University.
- CBCS/RTI/2015/196 (Report). Chennai: University of Madras. 24 March 2015.
- 1049/RTI.2/2015/PR (Report). Thiruvananthapuram: University of Kerala. 4 February 2015.
- AC AIII/1/41/2015 (Report). Kottayam: Mahatma Gandhi University. 13 May 2015.

=== Tertiary ===
==== Early Novels ====
- Anima, P. (31 January 2012). "Tours de force in Kozhikode". The Hindu. Kozhikode.
- (Staff Reporter) (5 October 2010). "Seminar in memory of Appu Nedungadi". The Hindu. Palakkad.
- Chandumenon, O (1995) [1890]. "ഇന്ദുലേഖ രണ്ടാം അച്ചടിപ്പിന്റെ അവതാരിക" [Introduction of Indulekha, second print]. Indulēkha ഇന്ദുലേഖ [Indulekha] (in Malayalam). Kottayam: D. C. Books.
- Vohra, Anirudh (28 June 2015). "Gujarat's Last Rajput King Karan Ghelo: A king's life". Industry. New Delhi: The Financial Express. Archived from the original on 10 March 2016.
- Herzberger, Radhika (19 July 2015). "A Fine Balance: Nandshankar's Karan Ghelo and the Downfall of Gujarat's Last Rajput Ruler". Vantage. New Delhi: The Caravan.
- Yousaf, Farida (2001). "Scott and Sharar: A study of Common Aspects of Historical Themes" (PDF). Faculty of Languages & Islamic Studies. Journal of Research. Multan: Bahauddin Zakariya University. Archived from the original (PDF) on 29 October 2010.
- George, K. M., ed. (1992). Modern Indian Literature, an Anthology: Surveys and Poems. Vol. I. New Delhi: Sahitya Akademi. ISBN 9788172013240.

- Murthy, K. Narasimha. Modern Kannada Literature.
- Padmanabhan, Neela. Modern Tamil Literature.

- Mahapatra, B. P.; Padmanabha, P.; McConnell, Grant D.; Verma, V. S. (1989). "The Written Languages of India : Bengali". Constitutional languages. The Written Languages of the World: A Survey of the Degree and Modes of Use. India. Vol. II. Québec: Les Presses de l'Université Laval. ISBN 9782763771861.
- Deo, Shripad D. (1996). "Twentieth-Century Marathi Literature". In Natarajan, Nalini; Nelson, Emmanuel Sampath (eds.). Handbook of Twentieth-Century Literatures of India. Westport, Connecticut: Greenwood Press. ISBN 9780313287787.
- Nayak, J. K.; Pati, Madhusudana (1982). "Rise of the Historical Novel in Orissa, Evolution of the Historical Novel in Oriya Literature : Padmamali". The Historical Novel in Oriya. Cuttak: Shri Anant Misra, Cuttak Students' Store.
- Samal, J. K.; Nayak, P. K. (1996). "Fakir Mohan Senapati". Makers of Modern Orissa. New Delhi: Abhinav Publications. ISBN 9788170173229.
- Narasiṃha Rao, V. V. Yal (1993). Chilakamarti Lakshmi Narasimham. Makers of Indian literature. New Delhi: Sahitya Akademi. ISBN 9788172014995.

==== Life style practices ====
- "Prasnam". Services. Kottayam: PN Sreedharan Nampoothiri, Piraliyil Illam.
- Narayanan, K. S. (2010). "Mashinottam, A unique Divinatory Path". Articles on Astrology. Chennai: Express Starteller.
- Narayanan, Dr Akavoor (2005). Bhattathiripad, P. Vinod (ed.). "Akavoor Mana". Some Namboothiri Illams. Calicut: Namboothiri Websites Trust.

==== Writing style ====
- Paul, M. P. (2005). "ഭാഷാഗദ്യശൈലി [Prose-style of language]". Sāhityavicāraṁ സാഹിത്യവിചാരം [Literary thought] (in Malayalam) (First Lipi ed.). Kozhikode: Lipi Publications.

=== Quaternary ===
- Menon, A. Sreedhara (2008) [1978]. "Language and literature". Cultural Heritage of Kerala (First DCB ed.). Kottayam: D. C. Books. ISBN 978-8126419036.
- Thilleri, Vasu (26 November 2013). "The evolution of press in Kerala". Political journalism and national movement in Malabar (Ph.D.). Malappuram: University of Calicut.
- Sivadasan, V (4 September 2012). "Agrarian question and mass media: The role of print media in the socio-economic transformation of Kerala (1934-1971)". Agrarian problems and the role of media and literature in Kerala: with special reference to socio-economic transformation 1934-1971 (Ph.D.). Kannur: Kannur University.
- "Metro Plus: Our archival heritage". The Hindu. Today's paper. Thiruvananthapuram. 2012. Archived from the original on 15 January 2022.
- Sasikumar, Rani (27 January 2001). "Young World: Dance of the heroes". The Hindu. Thiruvananthapuram.
- Sam, N. (2007). "Report of the Workshop on "Problems of Unicode encoding of Malayalam" conducted at University of Kerala on January 24-25, 2007, organized by the International Centre for Kerala Studies" (PDF). L2/07-057. Mountain View, CA: Unicode Consortium.
- C, Ravi D (2011). Addhyāpakarōṭuṁ rakṣākaṟttākkaḷōṭumāyi raṇṭu vākkŭ അദ്ധ്യാപകരോടും രക്ഷാകർത്താക്കളോടുമായി രണ്ടു വാക്ക് [Two words to teachers and guardians] (in Malayalam). (Abridged edn. 2011).
- Warrier, N. V. Krishna; P. Devadas, K. (2012) [1973]. "ഒന്നാം പതിപ്പിന്റെ ആമുഖം [Preface of first edition]". (Tiruvitāṁkūṟ Caritraṁ 2012) (in Malayalam).
- Harikumar, Advocate. V. (2012). Āmukhaṁ ആമുഖം [Preface] (in Malayalam). (Abridged edn. 2012).
- Mukherjee, Sujit (1999). "G". A Dictionary of Indian Literature: Beginnings-1850. Vol. I. New Delhi: Orient Blackswan. ISBN 8125014535.
- Varma, Ezhumattoor Rajaraja (2011). Pi. Ke. Paramēśvaran Nāyaṟ പി. കെ. പരമേശ്വരൻനായർ [P. K. Parameswaran Nair]. Thiruvananthapuram: P. K. Parameswaran Nair Memorial Trust. ISBN 9788124019139.
- Nair, Dr. P. V. Krishnan, ed. (2005) [1980]. "പ്രൊഫ. വി. ആനന്തക്കുട്ടൻ നായർ [Prof. V. Anandakkuttan Nair]". Kēraḷbhāṣāgānaṅṅaḷ കേരളഭാഷാഗാനങ്ങൾ [Folk songs in Kerala] (in Malayalam). Vol. II. Thrissur: Kerala Sahitya Akademi.
- C, Ravi D (ed.). Propha. pi. rāmacandrannāyaṟ പ്രൊഫ. പി. രാമചന്ദ്രൻനായർ [Prof. P. Ramachandran Nair] (in Malayalam). (Abridged edn. 2011).
- (Express News Service) (18 July 2014). "Thumpamon Thomas Passes Away". The New Indian Express. Thiruvananthapuram. Archived from the original on 14 February 2015.
- Ramachandran, Dr. V. (ed.). Ḍō. vi. rāmacandran ഡോ. വി. രാമചന്ദ്രൻ [Dr. V. Ramachandran] (in Malayalam). (Abridged edn. 2012).
- Jayakumar, K.; Rajendran, Vilakudi (2012) [1994]. "ആമുഖം [Preface]". In Jayakrishnan, N. (ed.). Kēraḷattila Cuvaṟcitraṅṅaḷ കേരളത്തിലെ ചുവർചിത്രങ്ങൾ [Murals in Kerala] (in Malayalam). Thiruvananthapuram: State Institute of Languages. ISBN 9788176382786.
- Caritṟaṁkuṟicca Śṟīpatmanābhasvāmi Kṣētraṁ ചരിത്രംകുറിച്ച ശ്രീപത്മനാഭസ്വാമി ക്ഷേത്രം [Sree Padmanabhaswamy temple that marked the history] (in Malayalam). Kottayam: D. C. Books. 2013 [2011]. ISBN 9788126433513.
- (Administrator) (4 September 2013). "Deans of the Faculties". Authorities. Thiruvananthapuram: University of Kerala.
- Pilla, V. R. Parameswaran (2012) [1973]. "ഗ്രന്ഥകാരനെ പറ്റി [About the author]". (Tiruvitāṁkūṟ Caritraṁ 2012) (in Malayalam).
- Raimon, S. (1996). "T.K. Velu Pillai, A biographical note". The Travancore State Manual Vol -I. KCHR Publications.
- B, Kumari Vanaja N., ed. (2005). Ḍō. ē.pi. ibṟāhiṁkuññŭ ഡോ. എ.പി. ഇബ്രാഹിംകുഞ്ഞ് [Dr. A.P. Ibrahim Kunju] (in Malayalam). (Māṟttāṇḍavaṟmma: Ādhunika Tiruvitāṁkūṟinṟe Udayaṁ 2005).
- Ḍō. pi.vi. vēlāyudhan p ഡോ. പി.വി. വേലായുധൻപിള്ള [Dr. P. V. VelayudhanPillai] (in Malayalam). (Āṇuṅṅaḷillātta Koṟa Valyakoṟa 2000).
- Nair, P. V. Krishnan, ed. (2005). Ḍō. kalpaṯa bālakr̥ṣṇan ഡോ.കല്പറ്റ ബാലകൃഷ്ണൻ [Dr. Kalpatta Balakrishnan] (in Malayalam). (Caritranōval Malayāḷattil 2005).

== AV media ==
=== Television ===
- Thambi, N. Gopinathan; Vellarada, P. M. Mani (15 January – 3 March 2003). Māṟttāṇḍavaṟma മാർത്താണ്ഡവർമ [Marthanda Varma] (in Malayalam). 30 minutes in. Doordarshan. DD Thiruvananthapuram.
- Sharma, Gautham (19 July 2010 – 21 May 2011). Vīramāṟttāṇḍavaṟmma വീരമാർത്താണ്ഡവർമ്മ [Veera Marthanda Varma] (in Malayalam). 30 minutes in. Sun Network. Surya TV.
- Venugopalan, Dr. P. (27 March 2014). Māṟttāṇḍavaṟmma മാർത്താണ്ഡവർമ്മ [Marthanda Varma] (in Malayalam). Event occurs at 15:30. Doordarshan. DD Malayalam.

- Māṟttāṇḍavaṟmma മാർത്താണ്ഡവർമ്മ [Marthanda Varma]. Episodical re-telecast (in Malayalam). 30 March – 4 May 2014. 30 minutes in. Doordarshan. DD Malayalam.

=== Radio ===
- G., Gopalakrishnan (17 July 1991 – 1 January 1992). Marthandavarma (in Malayalam). 30 minutes in. All India Radio. Akashvani Thiruvananthapuram.

- Marthandavarma. Episodical re-broadcast (in Malayalam). 20 January – 8 February 2014. 15 minutes in. All India Radio. Akashvani Thiruvananthapuram.

- Nair, K. V. Neelakandan (28 November – 12 December 2012). Subhadra (in Malayalam). 30 minutes in. All India Radio. Akashvani Thiruvananthapuram.

=== Movie ===
- P. V. Rao (Director) (12 May 1933). Marthanda Varma (Silent Motion picture). Thiruvananthapuram: Shri Rajeshwari Films.
- Lenin Rajendran (Director) (21 February 1997). Kulaṁ കുലം [Clan] (Motion picture) (in Malayalam). Thiruvananthapuram: Ambadi Pictures.
