= List of Marthandavarma characters =

The following is a list of characters in Marthandavarma, an 1891 historical novel by C. V. Raman Pillai.

== Main characters ==
=== Marthanda Varma (Prince) ===
Marthanda Varma is also referred to as Yuvarajavu (Prince). He is a young man, between 20 and 25 years old, with a heroic appearance. Heir to the throne after the reign of King Rama Varma, he is known for his generosity and reluctance to impose harsh punishment (as advised by Ramayyan Dalawa. To escape attackers, he often adopts disguises. He values Subhadra's words, which makes him release Kudamon Pillai from detention upon ascending the throne.

=== Ananthapadmanabhan ===
Ananthapadmanabhan adopts disguises, including Shamsudeen of Kasi and a mad Channan beggar, to help Marthanda Varma evade his enemies. Twenty-two years old, he is adept in combat. Ananthapadmanabhan is the son of Thirumukhathu Pillai from a relationship after his father's marriage to Kudaman Pillai's maternal niece, making him Subhadra's younger half-brother.

He is in love with Parukutty of Chembakassery. Attacked and left for dead in the Panchavan forest, he is rescued by Pathan merchants. After his recovery, he disguises himself to rescue Marthanda Varma from Mangoikkal and helps Hakkim help the prince. He introduces Mangoikkal Kuruppu to the Pathan merchants and helps him learn the Hindustani language.

=== Subhadra ===
Subhadra, also known as Chembakam Akka, is the daughter of Thirumukhathu Pillai and Kudamon Pillai's maternal niece. She is Ananthapadmanabhan's half-sister. Age 25, she is known for her beauty. She was married to a relative of Kudamon Pillai, but their marriage ended after six months due to allegations of a relationship between her and Padmanabhan Thambi.

Fierce and determined, Subhadra seeks revenge against those who destroyed her marriage and plays a key role in helping Marthanda Varma escape from the conspirators. She is killed by Kudamon Pillai.

=== Padmanabhan Thambi ===
Padmanabhan Thambi, also known as Shri Rayi Padmanabhan Thambi, Pappu Thambi or Thambi, is the elder son of King Rama Varma. A well-built man with a fair complexion, he likes to wear ornaments. He is attracted to beautiful women (including Subhadra and Parukutty), and is involved in relationships with Sivakami and a woman from Ezhamkudi (Seventh House). Ambitious and power-hungry, Thambi aspires to the throne after his father's reign.

=== Sundrayyan ===
Sundarayyan, also known as Pulamadan, is the 40-year-old son of a Brahmin from Madurai and a Marava woman. He is married to Kalakkutty's niece. Sundarayyan is the chief conspirator of plans to secure Thambi's succession to the throne. He rranges a marriage proposal between Thambi and Parukutty before he is killed by Beram Khan at Manakkadu.

=== Parukutty ===
Parukutty, also known as Parvathi Amma, Parvathi Pillai or Thankam, is the daughter of Karthyayani Amma and Ugran Kazhakkoottathu Pillai. The 16-year-old is tall, slim and fair, (resembling the magnolia champaca flower), and is well-versed in mathematics and the Amarakosha. She has a talent for reciting the Ramayana in a melodious voice. Parukutty is in love with Ananthapadmanabhan, but Padmanabhan Thambi is attracted to her.

=== Beeram Khan ===
The maternal nephew of a householder related to Kudamon Pillai, he marries Subhadra. He leaves her after believing false rumours about her relationships with other men, particularly Padmanabhan Thambi. He converts to Islam, adopts the name Beeram Khan, and marries Fathima. When he finds Ananthapadmanabhan in the Panchavan forest, he is struck by the prince's resemblance to his first wife and arranges for his care. Beeram Khan kills Sundarayyan, holding him responsible for his separation from Subhadra.

=== Velu Kurup ===
A skilled fighter, swordsman and lancer, Velu Kurup is loyal to Padmanabhan Thambi. He ambushes Ananthapadmanabhan in the Panchavan forest, and tries to assassinate Marthanda Varma at Charottu Palace, Mangoikkal House, and on the way to the prince's palace. Ananthapadmanabhan cuts off one of his ears, and kills him in the dungeon of Sree Pandarathu House.

=== Mangoikkal Kurup ===
Mangoikkal Kurup, also known as Iraviperuman Kandan Kumaran Kurup, is head of the Mangoikkal family. He shelters Marthanda Varma and Parameswaran Pillai while they are escaping from Velu Kurup and arranges for reinforcements, deploying his nephews to support Marthanda Varma.

== Major characters ==
- Ettuveetil Pillamar:
  - Kudaman Pillai – One of the Ettuveetil Pillamar, the nephew of Subhadra's grandmother. He kills Subhadra, and is later killed by Ananthapadmanabhan.
  - Ramanamadathil Pillai – Attracted to Subhadra, he has a wife and son whom he visits only on the day of Thiruvonam.
  - Kazhakkoottathu Pillai / Thevan Vikraman – Intended to propose marriage to Parukutty, the daughter of Ugran Kazhakkoottathu Pillai (his maternal uncle). He leads a force to defeat fighters from Kilimanoor, under the command of Narayanayyan.
  - Chembazhanthi Pillai / Thevan Nandi
  - Marthandan Thirumadathil Pillai
  - Venganoor Pillai – He and his men defeat the forces from Mangoikkal who are supporting Prince Marthanda Varma.
  - Pallichal Pillai
  - Ugran Kazhakkoottathu Pillai – Karthyayani Amma"s late husband, father of Parukutty, and maternal uncle of Thevan Vikraman Kazhakkoottathu Pillai.
- Parameswaran Pillai – Attendant and close companion of Prince Marthanda Varma. After Marthanda Varma ascends the throne, he becomes the king's manager.
- Raman Thambi – Younger son of King Rama Varma, who commands the Marava forces from Nanjinadu.
- Thirumukhathu Pillai – A minister of the kingdom, and father of Subhadra and Ananthapadmanabhan.
- Chulliyil Chadachi Marthandan Pillai – A skilled archer who serves Thirumukhathu Pillai but aligns himself with the Ettuveettil Pillamar.
- Kizhakkeveedu:
  - Anantham – Maternal niece of Kalakkutty and wife of Sundarayyan.
  - Kodanki / Palavesam – Elder brother of Sundarayyan, who is killed by Ananthapadmanabhan.
  - Kaalakutty Pillai – Maternal uncle of Anantham and a messenger of Prince Marthanda Varma.
- Chembakasserry:
  - Karthyayani Amma / Karthyayani Pillai – Widow of Ugran Kazhakkoottathu Pillai, mother of Parukutty, and younger sister of Chembakassery Mootha Pillai.
  - Chembakasserry Mootha Pillai – Elder brother of Karthyayani Amma.
  - Shanku Ashan – Caretaker of the armoury at Chembakassery, born to the previous armoury caretaker and a female servant at Chembakassery.
- Pathan camp:
  - Fathima – Elder daughter of Hakkim's younger brother and Ayisha and sister of Zulaikha and Nuradeen, who marries Beeram Khan.
  - Zulaikha – Younger daughter of Hakkim's younger brother and Ayisha, and sister of Fathima and Nuradeen. She cares for Ananthapadmanabhan, loving him in the guise of Shamsudeen.
  - Nuradeen – Son of Hakkim's younger brother and Ayisha, and brother of Fathima and Zulaikha.
  - Azim Ud-Dowla Khan / Hakkim – A specialist in traditional medicine, he is the paternal uncle of Fathima, Nuradeen, and Zulaikha. His treatments cure Ananthapadmanabhan, and he provides medication for King Rama Varma and Parukutty.
  - Usman Khan – The steward at Hakkim's camp who raised him as a son.
- Royal family:
  - Karthika Thirunal Rama Varma – The young prince. He is moved to Chembakassery with his mother for protection.
  - Raja Rama Varma – The ailing king, father of Padmanabhan Thambi and Raman Thambi. Prince Marthanda Varma refers to him as his maternal uncle.
- Royal officials:
  - Arumukham Pillai (Dalawa) – The prime minister of the kingdom, who travels to Boothapandi to pay for the forces from Madurai. He is forced to remain there as assurance for the payment.
  - Ramayyan (Rayasakkaran) – A ministerial official who helps the prince during the search for Mangoikkal Kurup. He pacifies the angry civilians who entered the palace grounds by presenting the ailing king to the crowd.
  - Narayanayyan – A royal servant who leads the men sent from Kilimanoor in support of Marthanda Varma.
- Supporters of the royal family:
  - Kilimanoor Koithampuran – Killed by the men of Ramanamadathil Pillai while defending against the conspiracy to kill the young prince, Karthika Thirunal Rama Varma.
  - Kerala Varma Koithampuran – Arranges additional forces for Marthanda Varma under the leadership of Narayanayyan, and guards Karthika Thirunal Rama Varma and his mother at Chembakassery.
  - Aruveettukar – A powerful, wealthy family and their supporters who ally with Thirumukhathu Pillai.
- Mangoikkal family:
  - Maternal nephews of Mangoikkal Kurup at Mangoikkal House:
    - Kochu Velu – The youngest.
    - Krishna Kurup / Kittan – The eldest.
    - Narayanan
    - Kumaran / Komaran
    - Kochu Kurup / Kochannan / Cheriya Kurup – Sent to Padmanabhapuram, he becomes frantic after his return when encountering men apparently following Velu Kurup.

Two nephews are instructed by Mangoikkal Kurup to make arrangements for the stay of Marthanda Varma and Parameswaran Pillai. All resist Velu Kurup and the attackers at Mangoikkal, going to Thiruvananthapuram to lead the forces from Mangoikkal in support of Marthanda Varma. Kochakkachi, the maternal niece of Mangoikkal Kurup, instructs Kochu Velu to arrange for the morning ablutions of Marthanda Varma and Parameswaran Pillai at Mangoikkal House.

== Other characters ==
- Channars:
  - Channars of Palm-plant – Channars at the palm-tree plantation, where Prince Marthanda Varma enquires about nearby Nair households while escaping from Charottu Palace.
  - Group of 50 – Killed by Thambi's men in accordance with his order to capture the mad Channan.
  - Channars who assemble after the 50-person slaughter. Mad Channan persuades them to help him defend Mangoikkal House.
  - Ozhukkan
  - Koppilan
  - Podiyan
  - Nandan
  - Rakithan
  - Suppiramaniyan
  - Ponnan
  - Poothathan
- Paramours of Padmanabhan Thambi:
  - Sivakami
  - Kamalam
- Helpers of Padmanabhan Thambi:
  - Lancers of Velu Kurup – A group of 14 lancers led by Velu Kurup to the Charottu palace. Two are killed by arrows shot by Chulliyil Chadachi Marthandan Pillai.
    - Kutti Pillai
    - Pappanachar
    - Chatayan Pillai
    - Ooli Nair
    - Parappan Nair
  - Lancers and Nairs – Group of 200 lancers and Nairs led by Velu Kurup in search of Marthanda Varma, who attacks Mangoikkal house. This group includes the surviving 12 lancers of Velu Kurup.
    - A group of 150 men is deployed near Mangoikkal house by Velu Kurup and led to Mangoikkal.
    - A group of 20 men is led along the main path to Mangoikkal.

A group of 150 lancers and Nairs sent by Padmanabhan Thambi aids Velu Kurup in the attack on Mangoikkal. One of the lancers returns to tell Padmanabhan Thambi about the defeat at Mangoikkal. A group of 500 fighters, including Marava people from Nanjinadu, is led by Raman Thambi.

- Mudaliyar lords in Nanjinadu who side with Padmanabhan Thambi:
  - Cherakonar
  - Mailavanar
  - Vanikaraman

== Character relations ==
Character relationships
style="border-spacing: 4px; border: 0px solid darkgray;"

Legend

descent	adoption	spouse relation	CA	CB	CA loves CB, Unrequited	spouse relation, separated	successful love

UW	Unnamed Woman	UM	Unnamed Man	UHH	Unnamed House-holder	UL	Unnamed Lady	UN	Unnamed Nair

style="border-spacing: 4px; border: 0px solid darkgray; text-align: left; line-height: 90%; stroke: red;"

Family / Clan Name	Matrilineal family
Family / Clan Name	Patrilineal family
Family / Clan Name	Family of lineage unknown
Family / Clan Name	Family of Collateral descent
Character	Character gets killed during the time-line of novel, Marthandavarma
Character	Active character during the timeline of novel, Marthandavarma
Character	Character obtains natural death during the time-line of novel, Marthandavarma

style="border-spacing: 4px; border: 0px solid darkgray; text-align: left; line-height: 90%;"

Paṭhān	Nair	Kudamon	Thirumukham	Unspecified
UW	UW
Hakim	UHH	UW	UW	Kudamon Pilla	UW	Thirumukhathu Pilla	UW
UM	Ayisha	Chembakassery Mootha Pilla
UN / Beeram Khan	Subhadra
Fathima	UL
Zulaikha	Ananthapadmanabhan (Note: Also as mad Channan, the dweller of Kāśi, the Diglot, the Beggar, and Shasudeen; continued in the sequel Dharmaraja as great Commander (Valiya Pada Thalavan))
Nuradeen	UL
Unspecified	Kizhakkeveedu	Shasthri	Marava
Kalakkutty Pilla	UW	Shasthri of Madurai	UW
UM (Note: Only in the first edition and its re-prints.)	Anantham	Sundarayyan	Kodanki
Mangoikkal
Unnamed Ladies	Mangoikkal Kuruppu (Note: Kandan Kumaran Kuruppu)
Krishna Kuruppu	Narayanan	Kochakkachi	Kochannan	Komaran	Kochu Velu (Note: Continues as Velyaudhan Thambi, Old Saint(Vr̥ddhasiddan), Fakir Shah (Pakīṟsā) in the sequel Dharmaraja)
Ramana Madam
Ramana Madathil Pilla	UW
Son (Note: As As Kaliyudayan Chandrakkaran in Dharmaraja, and as Kaali Prabha Battan, Manikya Gaundan in Ramarajabahadur)
Unspecified	Unspecified
UM (Note: previous armory care taker at Chembakassery)	UW (Note: a lady servant at Chembakassery)
Shanku Assan
Kilimanoor royal house
Kilimanoor Kerala Varma (Note: Kilimanoor elder brother)	Udaya Varma Koyi Thampuran
Kerala Varma Koyi Thampuran
Venadu royal family
UW	UW (Note: Mentions as Padmanabhan Thambi's mother as deceased during the timeline of the novel and did not link her to Raman Thambi.)	Rama Varma
UW	Marthanda Varma	Padmanabhan Thambi	Raman Thambi (Note: Padmanabhan Thambi raises the concern of being upset, if he is to claim the throne through lineal descent system implying that Raman Thambi is equally eligible like him for the throne as possibly born to a different mother.)
Little prince (Note: As Karthika Thirunal Rama Varma and as titular roles in Darmaraja and Ramarajabahadhur.)

Chembakassery	Kazhakoottam
Karthyayani Amma	Ugran Kazhakoottathu Pilla
UW
Parukutty	Thevan Vikraman Kazhakoottathu Pilla

Lineage-graph-notes

== Allusions to legendary and historical figures ==
=== Marthanda Varma ===
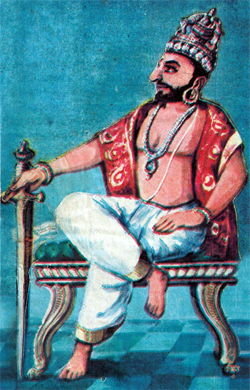
Marthanda Varma

Marthanda Varma, also known as Anizham Thirunal Marthanda Varma, ascended to the throne of Venad in 1729 and expanded the kingdom to form the state of Travancore. At age one, he lost his parents; his father (Kilimanoor Koithampuran) died of an illness, and his mother was adopted by the Venad royal family during the period of Umayamma Rani from Kolathunadu. The novel does not refer to Marthanda Varma's actual background; he calls King Rama Varma his maternal uncle, and refers to Kilimanoor Koithampuran (who sacrificed his life to save prince Karthika Thirunal Rama Varma from the plans of Ramanamadathil Pillai) as his elder brother.

=== Thambi duo ===
The Thambi duo (or Thambimar, or the Thambi brothers) refers to the two sons of king Rama Varma. In the royal edicts, Mathilakam Records, (Note: Matilakaṁ Grantavari or Mathilakam Records are palm leaf scrolls (churunas or curuṇakaḷ) with information about Sree Padmanabha Swamy Temple and the kingdom of erstwhile Travancore, written in ancient scripts of Kerala such as Vattezhuthu, Kolezhuthu, in addition to Tamil and Malayalam as royal orders (neettu or nīṭṭŭ), land records (ozhuku or oḻukŭ), treasury notices, taxation records, court proceedings, or boundary disputes.) the sons of king Rama Varma are Kunchu Thambi and Ilaya Thambi (Note: Kuñcu Taṁpi and Iḷaya Taṁpi. They are also referred to as Kanakku Thambi Raman Raman and Kanakku Thambi Raman Athichan (Kaṇakku Taṁpi Rāman Rāman and Kaṇakku Taṁpi Rāman Āticcan), respectively.) are the elder and younger brothers, respectively; the paterfamilias was Kumara Pillai. P. Shangoony Menon called them Papu Thambi and Raman Thambi in the History of Travancore from the Earliest Times; in The Sketch of Progress of Travancore, Nanoo Pillai wrote that they were commonly known as Coonju Thambimar and their names were Pulpu Thumbi and Raman Thambi. In folk songs and ballads, the elder brother is Valiya Thambi and the younger is Kunju Thambi; their mother's name is Abhirami or Kittanathalamma, (Note: Avirāmi or Kiṭṭaṇattāḷamma.) and they have a younger sister named Kochumani Thanka or Kochu Madamma. In the novel, the elder brother is Pappu Thambi (also known as Padmanabhan Thambi) and the younger brother is Raman Thambi. According to C. V. Raman Pillai's biography, Kesavan Thambi Karyakkar (his childhood caretaker) had two sons (Padmanabhan Thambi and Raman Thambi) with whom the author had grown up.

=== Ananthan (Ananthapadmanabhan) ===
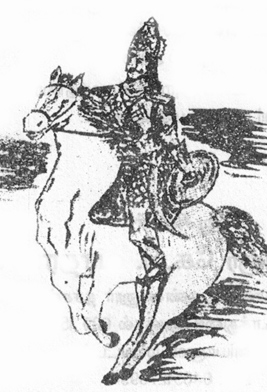
Ananthapadmanabhan

Ananthapadmanabhan was a warrior and expert in martial arts who defended the plans of conspirators against Marthanda Varma. According to N. Krishna Pillai and Anandakkuttan Nair, Ananthapadmanabhan served in the Travancore forces some time after Kollavarsham 904 (Gregorian calendar 1729) and received royal properties in Kollavarsham 920 (1745); according to A. P. Ibrahim Kunju, the properties were awarded in 1748. He was born Ananthan Perumal to Thanumalaya Perumal and Lakshmi Devi of the Sanror clan, and was affectionately called Padmanabhan by his maternal uncle. In the novel, the author did not affirm the caste of Ananthapadmanabhan by providing details about his mother; he is not referred to as a Pillai or Nair, although he is described as the son of Thirumukhathu Pillai. The character's love interest in the novel – Parukkutty (Parvathi Amma) – evokes Ananthan's spouse, Parvathi Ammal. The character is known as Ananthapadmanabha Pillai in ballads (Note: Valiyattampikkuñcuttampikkataippāṭal, Tampimar Katai, and Valiyataṁpi Kuñcutaṁpi Katha.) about the Thambi brothers and Ananthan in other ballads, such as "Aṉantan Pāṭṭŭ" and "Ōṭṭan Katai". In the novel, the alter ego of Shamsudeen lives with the Pathans at Manacaud. C. V. Raman Pillai went to Hyderabad to recover from heartbreak, and it was suggested that he convert to Islam and marry a Muslim woman. Shamsudeen resembles the author's experiences.

=== Rama Varma ===
Rama Varma was the ruler of Venad in Kollavarsham 899–903. He is a descendant of Kolathunadu kingdom, from where he was adopted by the Travancore royal family during the period of Umayamma Rani. He was adopted with Unni Kerala Varma and two other women, one of whom one became the mother of Marthanda Varma. P. Shangoony Menon and V. Nagam Aiya say that the four people were provided from Kolathunadu to Travancore family at the request of Umayamma Rani. T. K. Velu Pillai says that they were adopted by Ravi Varma in Kollavarsham 863. Rama Varma is the father of Thambimar, succeededing his brother and ascending the throne of Venad in Kollavarsham 899. According to T. K. Velu Pillai, Rama Varma was a weak ruler and his reign led to the disorganization of political life in Travancore. He died after a brief illness in 1729.

=== Karthika Thirunal Rama Varma ===
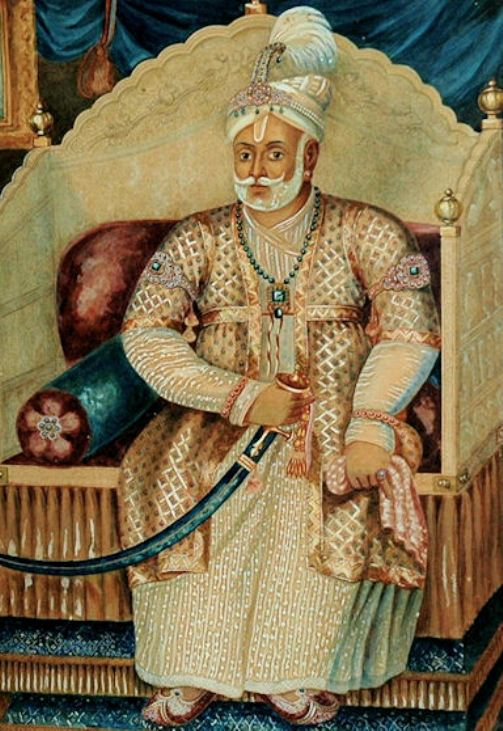
Dharma Raja

Karthika Thirunal Rama Varma (also known as Dharma Raja) ascended the throne of Travancore in Kollavarsham 933, succeeding Marthanda Varma. He was born in Kollavarsham 899, the son of a Kilimanoor Thampuran and Attingal queen who was adopted as a princess by the Travancore royal family from Kolathunadu during the Ravi Varma era.

=== Queen of Attingal ===
The Queen of Attingal was the mother of Karthika Thirunal Rama Varma. She was adopted by the Travancore royal family from the Kolathunadu kingdom in Kollavarsham 893 during the reign of King Ravi Varma. She gave birth to Karthika Thirunal Rama Varma from an alliance with a lord of Kilmanoor in Kollavarsham 899.

=== Kilimanoor Thampurans ===
Kilimanoor Thampurans are the lords of Kilimanoor house, north of Thriruvananthapuram. According to V. Nagam Aiya, the house of Kilimanoor has been connected with the Travancore royal family; male family members are chosen for alliances with the queens of Travancore. In the novel, two lords of Kilimanoor are mentioned: Kilimanoor Kerala Varma and Kilimanoor Koithampuran. The former sacrifices his life defending against plans to endanger the young prince Karthika Thirunal Rama Varma and his mother, and the latter guards the prince and his mother during an attempted coup d'état by the Thambi brothers and Ettuveettil Pillais at Thiruvananthapuram.

=== Royal relationships ===
Royal lineage
style="border-spacing: 4px; border: 0px solid darkgray;"

Legend

descent	adoption	spouse relation

UW	Unnamed Woman	UM	Unnamed Man	PM	Unnamed Prince	PW	Unnamed Princess	UL	Unnamed Lord

style="border-spacing: 4px; border: 0px solid darkgray; text-align: left; line-height: 90%; stroke: red;"

Family / clan Name	Matrilineal family
Family / clan Name	Patrilineal family
Family / clan Name	Family of lineage unknown
Family / clan Name	Family of Collateral descent
Person / Name	Only mentioned in legends and ballads
Person / Name	Ascended to the throne

Venadu-Travancore royal family
UW	Umayamma Rani	Kingdom of Kottayam
Ravi Varma (1678-1718)	Kolathunadu royal house	Kottayam Kerala Varma
Aditya Varma
Pillai
Unni Kerala Varma (1718-1724)	PW	Kilimanoor royal house
Kumara Pilla	UW (Note: Referred as Abhirāma, Avirāma, Kiṭṭaṇattāḷamma in the ballads.)	Rama Varma (1724-1729)	Madathumkur royal house	PW	UL
Rāman (Note: Referred as Rāman Rāman, Valiya Tampi, Padmanābhan Tampi, Pappu Tampi, Kuñcu Tampi.)	Aathichan (Note: Referred as Rāman Ātican, Kuñcu Tampi, Rāman Tampi, Iḷaya Tampi.)	Thanka (Note: Referred as Koccumaṇi Taṅka, Koccu Mādammain the ballads.)	PM	Marthanda Varma	Kilimanoor Kerala Varma	PW (Note: Attingal Queen, Royal mother.)
Ravi Varma (Note: Makayiraṁ Tirunāḷ Ravi Vaṟma.)	Rama Varma (Note: Kāṟtika Tirunāḷ Rāma Vaṟma, Dhaṟmarāja, Rāmarajabahadūṟ.)

Lineage-graph-notes:

=== Ettuveetil Pillamar ===
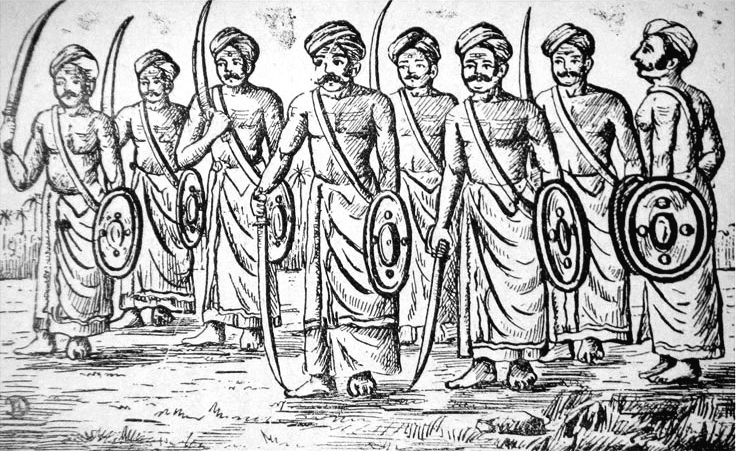
The Ettuveetil Pillamar

The Ettuveetil Pillamar were the chiefs of eight noble Nair families in Venad (Travancore). They were one of the main groups who conspired against the accession of Marthanda Varma. In royal edicts, Kudamon Pillai (one of the Ettuveetil Pillamar mentioned in the novel) is referred to in a group (Note: Group I (1. Kanakku Thambi Raman Raman, 2. Kanakku Thambi Raman Athichan) as Thambimar; both were killed.; Group II (1. Koduman Pillai, 2. Vanchikkuttathu Pillai, 3. Karakkulathu Pillai); Karakkulathu Pillai was killed.; Group III (1. Ettuveettil Madambi Panayara Shankaran Pandarathu Kurup, 2. Kochu Mahadevan Pandarathu Kurup, 3. Thekkeveettil Eachambi Kurup, 4. Vadakkeveettil Eachambi Kurup, 5. Chiriyankeezhu Mundakkal Kamachotti Pillai, 6. Makizhanchery Ravikutty Pillai, 7. Thekkeveettil Cherupulli Nambukali Pillai, 8. Valiya Pillai Kunchu Irayimman Pillai); all were punished.; Group IV (1. Idathara Thrivikraman, 2. Ilambeal Marthandan Ravi); both were punished.; Group V (1. Kulathur Kanakku Kali Kali, 2. Kazhakkoottam Kanakku Raman Ichuvaran, 3. Chiriyankeezhu Vadakkeveettil Kanakku Cherupulli Marthandan Ananthan, 4. Parakkottu Kanakku Ayyappan Vikraman, 5. Kanakku Thambi Raman Raman, 6. Pandikkuttathil Kanakku Shankaranarayanan Ayyappan); all were punished.; Group VI (1. Kochu Kunjan Pandarathu Kurup, 2. Valiya Pillai Kunchu Irayimman Pillai); both were freed.; Group VII (1. Parakkottu Thikkakutti Pillai, 2. Pandikkuttathil Ayyappan Pillai); both were freed.) of conspirators against Marthanda Varma. According to P. Venugopalan, the Ettuveetil Pillamar mentioned in the novel are based on verses from the Sree Veera Marthandavarmacharitham aattakatha, published in 1883–1884 by P. Govinda Pillai. Except for Thirumadathil Pillai, all other Ettuveetil Pillamar titles in the novel refer to the verses (an extract of which is an epigraph in its eleventh chapter). P. Shangoony Menon identified the eight (Note: Ramanamadathil Pillai, Mathanamadathil Pillai, Kolathoo Pillai, Kalacoottathu Pillai, Chembalathil Pillai, Pallichel Pillay, Kudamun Pillay and Venganoor Pillay.) Ettuveetil Pillamar. V. Nagam Aiya says that their titles are the names of the villages (Note: Ramanamatam, Martandam, Kulattur, Kazhakuttam, Chembazhanthi, Pallichal, Koduman and Venganur.) they headed, not their family names. According to P. Shangunny Menon, Madambies (or Madampimar) were petty chiefs who were confederates of the Ettuveetil Pillamar. In the Malayalam translation of History of Travancore from the Earliest Times, C. K. Kareem says that Ettuveetil Pillamar were gradually expanded with Madambies despite a conflict with the source material. According to Nanoo Pillai, the Madampimars and Ettuveetil Pillamar were hereditary enemies of Marthanda Varma. T. K. Velu Pillai says that the Ettuveetil Pillais were mistaken for the Madathil Pillais, who managed the properties of six areas; the chiefs were Ettuveettil Madambimar, not Ettuveettil Pillamar. The Kulathur Pillai and Kazhakkoottathu Pillai were mentioned as the Pillais of six houses (including a Tamil) in the royal edicts, although no such information is in the royal edicts Mathilakam Records – M. Doc. CXXX. Ibrahim Kunju cites references to a conspiracy by Pillais in Letters to Tellicherry, (Note: Letters to Tellicherry are records of the Madras Presidency published as part of Records of Fort St. George in 12 volumes by the Superintendent of Government Press, Madras, in 1934.) the British records.

=== Arukkoottathil Pillais ===
Arukkoottathil Pillais, or Arukoottathil Pillamar, refer to members of wealthy, noble Nair families prevailed in Travancore. The royal edicts mention that a group of six members are among the conspirators during the reign of Marthanda Varma. In the novel, they appear as a Thambi clan (Aruveettukar) allied with Thirumukhathu Pillai.

=== Ramayyan ===
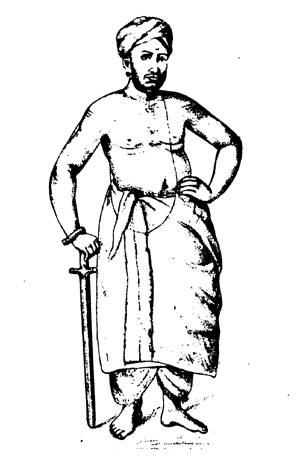
Ramayyan

Ramayyan Dalawa was the prime minister of Travancore from Kollavarsham 912 to 931, the period of the most-successful conquests under Marthanda Varma. He joined the Travancore ministerial service as a Kuṭṭi Paṭṭar (a minor Brahmin assistant) and was promoted as under-secretary (Rayasom) and state secretary after the accession of Marthanda Varma, who made him a dalawa after the death of Thanu Pillai.

=== Narayanayyan ===
Narayanayyan, or Naraayana Iyen, was Ramayyan's assistant when he was state secretary.

=== Arumukham Pillai ===
Arumukham Pillai was the acting dewan of Venad in Kollavarsham 901–903, and became dewan after the accession of Marthanda Varma until 909. He was detained by mercenary forces from Madurai due to incomplete payment for their service as additional forces for Travancore.

=== Mangottu Assan ===
Mangottu Assan was head of a Mancode family and a master of the 108 kalaries (martial-arts schools) in Venad. In the ballad Ōṭṭan Katai, his house was burned down by Kunchukkoottam (men of Kunchu Thambi).

=== Valiya Sarwadhi Karyakkar and Sarwadhi Karyakkar ===
Valiya Sarwadhi Karyakkar is the title for the administrative head of Travancore, and Sarwadhi Karyakkar is the title for a district officer under Valiya Sarwadhi Karyakkar. During the reign of Rama Varma, Valiya Sarwadhi Karyakkar was under the king.

=== Chadachi Marthandan ===
According to P. Venugopalan, Chadachi Marthandan is mentioned in the legends as a former conspirator who becomes the supporter of Marthanda Varma. N. Ajithkumar notes that in the legends, his house was at Chulliyur.

=== Madurai forces ===
Madurai forces were the mercenaries sent to Travancore in accordance with the agreement by Rama Varma and Madurai Nayaks of Thiruchirapalli in Kollavarsham 901. T. K. Velu Pillai says that such an agreement was impossible, but agrees with the detention of Arumukham Pillai by the mercenaries.

=== Other characters ===
Subardra is based on the author's wife, Bhageerithi Amma. Thirumukhathu Pillai is based on Nangoikkal Kesavan Thambi, the author's caretaker and patron, who was a karyakkar (administrative head of a Taluk) in Travancore. In the novel, there is a reference to a namboothiripad of Akavoor (Note: Akavoor Mana was a house of namboothiries situated at Vellarappilly near Kalady of Ernakulam district; some of the family were ascetics devoted to prayers, meditation, and Tantric rites.) family.

== Complex character relationships ==
Character relationships
style="border-spacing: 4px; border: 0px solid darkgray;"

Legend

descent	adoption	spouse relation	CA	CB	CA loves CB, Unrequited	spouse relation, separated	successful love

UW	Unnamed Woman	UM	Unnamed Man	UHH	Unnamed House-holder	UL	Unnamed Lady	UN	Unnamed Nair

style="border-spacing: 4px; border: 0px solid darkgray; text-align: left; line-height: 90%; stroke: red;"

Family / Clan Name	Matrilineal family
Family / Clan Name	Patrilineal family
Family / Clan Name	Family of lineage unknown
Family / Clan Name	Family of Collateral descent
Character	Character gets killed during the time-line of novel, Marthandavarma	Character	Character gets killed during the time-line of novel, Dharmaraja
Character	Active character during the timeline of novel, Marthandavarma	Character	Active character during the timeline of novel, Dharmaraja
Character	Character obtains natural death during the time-line of novel, Marthandavarma	Character	Character obtains natural death during the time-line of novel, Dharmaraja
Character	Character appears in novels, Marthandavarma, Dharmaraja, and Ramarajabahadur	Character	Character gets killed during the time-line of novel, Ramarajabahadur
Character	Character appears only in the novels, Marthandavarma, and Dharmaraja	Character	Active character during the timeline of novel, Ramarajabahadur
Character	Character appears only in the novels, Dharmaraja, and Ramarajabahadur	Character	Character obtains natural death during the time-line of novel, Ramarajabahadur

style="border-spacing: 4px; border: 0px solid darkgray; text-align: left; line-height: 90%;"

Paṭhān	Nair	Kudamon	Thirumukham	Unspecified	Chembakassery	Kazhakoottam
UW	UW
Hākiṁ	UHH	UW	UW	Kuṭamaṇ Piḷḷa	UW	Tirumukhattu Piḷḷa	UW
UM	Āyiṣa	Cempakaśśēri Mūtta Piḷḷa	Kāṟttyāyani Amma	Ugran Kaḻakūṭṭattu Piḷḷa
UN / Bīṟāṁkhān	Subhadra	UW
Fāttima	UL
Zulaikha	Aṉantapadmanābhan (Note: Also as mad Cānnān, the dweller of Kāśi, the Diglot, the Beggar, Ṣaṁsuḍīn in Marthandavarma novel and as Valiyapaṭattalavan in Dharmaraja novel.)	Pāṟukkuṭṭi	Tēvan Vikṟaman
Nuṟaḍīn	UL	Tripura Sundari Kuññamma	Kuṭṭikōntiśśan
Unspecified	Kiḻakkēvīdŭ	Śāstri	Maṟava	Son
Unspecified	Unspecified
Kālakkuṭṭi Piḷḷa	UW	Śāstri of Madurai	UW	Sāvitri	Haripañcāṉan (Note: Ugran, UgraHaripañcāṉan)	Śāntan (Note: ŚāntaHaripañcāṉan)
UM (Note: previous armory care taker at Chembakassery)	UW (Note: a lady servant at Chembakassery)
UM (Note: Only in the first edition of Marthandavarma novel and its re-prints.)	Āṉantaṁ	Sundrayyan	Kōṭānki	Chilambinazhiyam	Ramanamadam
Śanku Āśān	Mangoikkal
UW	Rāmaṉāmaṭhattil Piḷḷa
Unnamed Ladies	Mānkoikkal Kuṟuppŭ (Note: Kaṇṭankumāran Kuṟuppŭ)	Nanthiyam
Pilla
Kr̥ṣṇakuṟuppŭ	Nārāyaṇan	Koccakkacci	Koccaṇṇan	Komaran	Koccuvēlu (Note: As Koccuvēlu in Marthandavarmaand as Vēlāyudhan Tampi, Vr̥ddhasiddan, Pakīṟsā in Dharmaraja.)	Koccammiṇi
Rāghavan Uṇṇittān	UW
Devicode	Mangavu	Naganthali
Ummiṇi Piḷḷa
UW	UM	UW	UW
UW	Cantṟakkāran (Note: As Unnamed Son in Marthandavarma, As Kāliyuṭayān Cantṟakkāran in Dharmaraja, and as Kāḷiprabhabaṭṭan, Māṇikyagauṇṭan in Ramarajabahadur)
UW	Kuñcumāyiṯi Piḷḷā/ Paṟapāṇṭa/ Periñcakkōṭan	Mādhavi	Nārayaṇan Nampūtirippāṭŭ
Lakṣmi
Koccŭ Irayimman Tampi	Mādhavanāykkan (Note: Paṅki, Ajithasimhan disguise, Mādhava Menon)	Naṅṅaya Antaṟjaṉaṁ / Lakṣmi	Mīṉākṣi	Kēśavan Kuññŭ
Unspecified	Unspecified
Kumāran Tampi
Kuppaśśāṟ	UW
Kēśava Piḷḷa	Kallaṟaykkal Piḷḷa	Dēvaki	Trivikṟaman	Sāvitri
Son	Bhairavan
Kiḷimānoor family	Venadu Royal
Kiḷimānūṟ Keraḷa Vaṟma (Note: Kiḷimānūṟ elder brother)	UW	UW (Note: Referred as Adyathinte Amma)	Rāma Vaṟmma (Note: Referred as Valiya Tampurān)
Udayavaṟma Koyittampurān	UW (Note: Referred as 'Ammattampurāṭṭi' in Marthandavarma novel.)	Maṟttāṇḍa Vaṟmma	Padmaṉabhan Tampi (Note: Pappu Tampi, Valiya Tampi, Valiyaṅkathe)	Rāman Tampi (Note: Śrīrāman Tampi)
Keraḷavaṟma Koyittampurān	Kāṟttika Tirunāḷ Rāma Vaṟmma (Note: As Little Prince in Marthandavarma and as titular roles in Dharmaraja, Ramarajabahadur.)

Lineage-graph-notes

== Bibliography ==
- Aiya, V. Nagam (1999) [1906]. The Travancore State Manual. Vol. I. Thiruvananthapuram: Kerala Gazetteers Department, Govt. of Kerala.
- Pillai, T.K. Velu (1996) [1940]. The Travancore State Manual (in Malayalam). Vol. II. Thiruvananthapuram: Kerala Gazetteers Department, Govt. of Kerala.

- Anonymous authors (1996) [1325–1872]. Pillai, T.K. Velu (ed.). Historical Documents (in Malayalam).

- Kunju, Dr. A.P. Ibrahim (2005) [1990]. Māṟttāṇḍavaṟmma: Ādhunika Tiruvitāṁkūṟinṟe Udayaṁ മാർത്താണ്ഡവർമ്മ: ആധുനിക തിരുവിതാംകൂറിന്റെ ഉദയം [Marthanda Varma : Rise of Modern Travancore] (in Malayalam). Thiruvananthapuram: Cultural Publications Department, Govt. of Kerala.
- Pillai, C.V. Raman (1991) [1891]. Māṟttāṇḍavaṟmma മാർത്താണ്ഡവർമ്മ [Marthandavarma] (in Malayalam). Kottayam: Sahitya Pravarthaka Co-operative Society Ltd.
- Staff Reporter (June 9, 2012). "Our archival heritage". Metro Plus. Thiruvananthapuram: The Hindu. Archived from the original on January 15, 2022.
- Menon, P. Shangoony (1998) [1879]. History of Travancore from the Earliest Times. New Delhi: Asian Educational Services.
- Elenkath, K. R. (1974). Dewan Nanoo Pillay Biography with his select writings and letters. Neyyoor-West: Dewan Nanoo Pillay Memorial Reading Room.

- Pillay, Nanoo (1974) [1886]. Elenkath, K. R. (ed.). The Sketch of Progress of Travancore.

- Padmakumari, Prof. J.; Hussain, K.B.M, eds. (2003). Valiyatampi Kuñcutampi Katha വലിയതമ്പി കുഞ്ചുതമ്പി കഥ [Big Brother Small Brother Story] (in Malayalam). Thiruvananthapuram: State Institute of Languages.
- Natarajan, T.; Sarveswaran, P., eds. (2001). Tampimār Katai தம்பிமார் கதை [Brothers Story] (in Tamil). Madurai: Madurai Kamaraj University.
- Nair, P. K. Parameswaran (2014) [1948]. Si. Vi. Rāman Piḷḷa സി. വി. രാമൻ പിള്ള [C. V. Raman Pillai] (in Malayalam). Thrissur: Kerala Sahitya Akademi.
- Varatharajan, K. P. (2000). Tiruvaṭi Tēcaṁ Tiruppāppūr Paramparai Śrīmat Aṉantapatmanāpaṉ Nāṭār Varalāṟu திருவடி தேசம் திருப்பாப்பூர் பரம்பரை மாவீரன் ஶ்ரீமத் அனந்தபத்மநாபன் நாடார் வரலாறு [History of great hero Mr. Ananthapadmanabhan Nadar in Thripappur lineage of Thiruvati nation] (in Tamil). Kattathurai: Ananthapadmanabhan Trust.
- Pillai, C. V. Raman (2009) [1891]. Māṟttāṇḍavaṟmma മാർത്താണ്ഡവർമ്മ [Marthandavarma] (Definitive Variorum Revised ed.).

- Pilla, Prof. N. Krishna; Nair, Prof. V. Anandakkuttan (2009) [1983]. Māṟttāṇḍavaṟmma: Caritravuṁ Kalpanayuṁ മാർത്താണ്ഡവർമ്മ: ചരിത്രവും കല്പനയും [Marthandavarma: History and Figment] (in Malayalam).
- Venugopalan, Dr. P. (2009) [1992]. Sūcitasāhityakr̥tikaḷ - oru paṭhanaṁ സൂചിതസാഹിത്യകൃതികൾ - ഒരു പഠനം [Referred Literary works – A study] (in Malayalam).
- Venugopalan, Dr. P. (2009) [1992]. Māṟttāṇḍavaṟmma: Sr̥ṣṭiyuṁ svarūpavuṁ മാർത്താണ്ഡവർമ്മ: സൃഷ്ടിയും സ്വരൂപവും [Marthandavarma: Creation and Formation] (in Malayalam).
- Pillai, C. V. Raman (2016) [1891]. Māṟttāṇḍavaṟmma മാർത്താണ്ഡവർമ്മ [Marthandavarma] (Kindle ed.).

- Kunju, Dr. A. P. Ibrahim (1976). Rise of Travancore: A Study of life and times of Marthanda Varma. Trivandrum: Kerala Historical Society.
- Immanuel, Dr. M.; Sarveswaran, Dr. P., eds. (2011). Māvīraṉ Taḷapati Aṉantapatmanāpaṉ மாவீரன் தளபதி அனந்தபத்மநாபன் [Great Commander Ananthapadmanabhan] (in Tamil). Nagercoil: Cultural Historical Linguistic Indigenous Research Organisation, India.

- Radhakrishnan, R. (2011). Tiruvaṭi Paramparaiyil Utitta Māvīraṉ திருவடி பரம்பரையில் உதித்த மாவீரன் [Hero emerged in the Thiruvati Lineage] (in Tamil).
- Shobhanan, Dr. B. (2011). A Note on Ananthapadmanabhan.
- Parthan (2011). Anantapatmanābhan nāṭāruṁ tiruvitāṁkūṟ niṟmmitiyuṁ അനന്തപത്മനാഭൻ നാടാരും തിരുവിതാംകൂർ നിർമ്മിതിയും [Ananthapadmanabhan Nadar and Travancore formation] (in Malayalam).

- Immanuel, Dr. M. (2007). Kanniyakumari: Aspects and Architects. Nagercoil: Historical Research and Publications Trust.
- Thampi, Dr. G. Thrivikraman (2008). Tekkanpāṭṭukaḷuṁ Vāmoḻippāṭṭukaḷuṁ: Uḷḷorukkaṅṅaḷ Uḷpporuḷukaḷ തെക്കൻപാട്ടുകളും വാമൊഴിപ്പാട്ടുകളും: ഉള്ളൊരുക്കങ്ങൾ ഉൾപ്പൊരുളുകൾ [Southern Ballads and Vernacular Songs: Inner equipments and inner meanings] (in Malayalam). Thiruvananthapuram: Raja Raja Varma Basha Padana Kendram.
- Sarveswaran, Dr. P., ed. (1982). Ōṭṭaṉ Katai ஓட்டன் கதை [Runner Tale] (in Tamil). Madurai: Mano Publishers.
- Kareem, C. K. (2012) [1973]. Tiruvitāṁkūṟ Caritraṁ തിരുവിതാംകൂർ ചരിത്രം [Travancore History] (in Malayalam). Thiruvananthapuram: State Institute of Languages. ISBN 9788176380744.
- Nair, Prof. Panmana Ramachandran, ed. (2013). Si. Vi. Paṭhanaṅṅaḷ സി. വി. പഠനങ്ങൾ [C. V. Studies]. Thiruvananthapuram: P. K. Parameswaran Nair Memorial Trust. ISBN 9788124019566.

- Ajithkumar, Dr. N. (2013). Janakīyasaṁskāraṁ ജനകീയസംസ്കാരം [Popular Culture] (in Malayalam).

- Narayanan, Dr Akavoor (2005). Bhattathiripad, P. Vinod (ed.). "Akavoor Mana". Some Namboothiri Illams. Calicut: Namboothiri Websites Trust.
