= Travancore State Manual =

The Travancore State Manual is an official publication of the erstwhile Travancore kingdom, compiled by Dewan Peishkar V. Nagam Aiya under the command of the Maharaja of Travancore. Published in 1906, the book details the social, economic, and historical accounts of the state. It follows the pattern of the district manuals and gazetteers of the British Raj. The work was revised in a four-volume set by T. K. Velupillai in 1940.

The section on the Fauna of Travancore was contributed by Harold S. Ferguson, Esq. (F. L. N., F. Z. S), who Nagam Aiya describes as "an authority" in the subject, "having spent nearly the whole of his life in the country, first as a Planter for several years on the Travancore Hills, then as the Guardian of the Princes, then as Commandant of one of the battalions in the Travancore army (Nayar Brigade), and lastly as the Director of the Government Museum and the Public Gardens at Trivandrum."

== Background ==
Nagam Aiya mentions that he was commanded by His Highness, the Maharajah of Travancore, to write the Travancore State Manual with the simple instruction that it should follow the model of the district manuals of the Madras Presidency, which was under English rule. However, he also mentions that the idea had been "broached" to him by Dewan T. Rama Row, C.I.E., about fourteen years earlier. At that time, Nagam Aiya had been working as the Dewan Peishcar and District Magistrate of Quilon. Even though the Dewan did obtain the Maharajah sanction for the project, the Dewan himself retired within a few months, and the matter was dropped.

However, the matter was revived by Dewan Mr. K. Krishnaswamy Row, C.I.E., in 1901. Nagam Aiya did a lot of pioneering, original research and work to obtain a majority of the information of this book. What came out was a book of an "encyclopaedic nature spread over a space of more than 1820 pages of letter-press". He started his work on this project as a full-time officer from December 1904.

== Contents ==
The Travancore State Manual is a huge book not only on the antiquity of Travancore, but also of various other features of the place. A detailed study and examination of the physical features, geology, climate, rainfall, meteorology, flora, fauna, and archaeology of the place is also present.

Detailed writings are included on the following: geographical location, boundaries, shape and area of the landscape, mountains, plateaus, mountain passes, rivers, canals, backwaters, coastline, ports, shipping facilities, economic geology, climate, rainfall, meteorology, trees, medicinal plants, flowering and ornamental plants, birds, animals, architecture, sculpture, coins, inscriptions, forts and military works, archaeology, fauna, census and population, language, economic condition and various other topics. There are a number of photographs, including pictures of the stone inscriptions collected from various parts of the kingdom. The latter part of the book details the history of the localities that were later to be joined together to form Travancore kingdom. The delineation of history starts from the Parasurama legend, which is also mentioned in great detail. Then it moves to the times of the Perumals.

Mentions about the Malabar and Travancore coasts in the ancient maritime trade records are seen. Then the history part deals with the ancient kings. There is mention of a Kurava king, who seems to have been assassinated in a premeditated conspiracy.

There is either detailed mention or detailed write-up on items such as early missionaries, neighbouring kingdoms, accounts of travellers, Portuguese presence in Malabar and Travancore, Ettuvittial Pillamaar, Marthanda Varma, Zamorin, small kings and kingdoms north of Travancore, small-time rulers of Malabar, the attacks and occupation attempts by Sultan Tipu etc.

Velu Thampi Dalawa’s rebellion is dealt with in details. Even though there is sympathy, in a profound analysis, Nagam Aiya does not find Velu Thampi's cause correct or praiseworthy. The proclamation made by Velu Thampi from Kundara is quoted in an elaborate manner. However, a full reading of the same would not find it to be in sync with modern Indian aspirations.

Velu Tampi was a daring and clever though unscrupulous man. Rebellion was his forte.

His favourite modes of punishment were: imprisonment, confiscation of property, public flogging, cutting off the palm of the hand, the ears or the nose, impalement or crucifying people by driving down nails on their chests to trees, and such like, too abhorrent to record here.

All rulers of Travancore since the reign of Marthanda Varma are dealt in reasonable detail. Swathi Thirunal Rama Varma's tragic life is mentioned.

In the introduction of the book, Nagam Aiya mentions the following:

ultimate success of the English East India Company, our early friendships with them and the staunch support which they in return uniformly gave us through all vicissitudes of fortune, ultimately resulting in a strong bond of political alliance and reciprocal trust and confidence, which assured to us internal security and immunity from external aggression, thus enabling us to achieve the triumphs of peace and good government, until step by step we reached the enviable height of being known as the Model Native State’ of India.

== See also ==
- Cochin State Manual
- Native life in Travancore by Rev. Samuel Mateer
- Castes and Tribes of Southern India by Edgar Thurston
- Malabar Manual by William Logan
