= Cochin State Manual =

Publication

The Cochin State Manual was a 1911 CE publication of the erstwhile Kingdom of Cochin, detailing the social, economic, and historical conditions of the state. It was compiled by C. Achutha Menon (1862–1937), secretary to the Devaswom of Cochin, and bore close similarity to the district manuals and gazetteers of the British Raj.

== See also ==
- Travancore State Manual
- Devaswom boards in Kerala
