= Shri Subramanya Sabha =

Shri Subrahmanya Sabha is a cultural organization formed by the Sthanika Brahmin community in 1908. Its headquarters are located in Mangalore.

The organization was formed to encourage self-development amongst youth as well as adult members of the Brahmin society. Its aims include the promotion of education (in both Sanskrit and English) and employment, and socio-cultural development. To this end it offers such services as medical assistance to the needy, scholarships and loans for university students, career guidance, and annual visits to Shringeri for the Guruvandana mass prayer.

On May 10, 2008, the organization began its centenary celebration with religious and cultural programmes.
