= Chithrabhumi =

- Cover of Chithrabhumi dated 16 July 2011
- Frequency: Weekly
- Founded: 1982
- Company: Mathrubhumi
- Country: India
- Based in: Kozhikode
- Language: Malayalam
- Website: mathrubhumi.com

Chithrabhumi is a film magazine in Malayalam published from Kozhikode, Kerala. It is part the Mathrubhumi group. The magazine was started in 1982.
