= Sthanika Brahmin =

Oldest Tulu Brāhmins primarily from the coastal Karnataka

Regions with significant populations
- Indian states of Karnataka, Maharashtra, Kerala, Seemandhra, Telangana, Tamilnadu,

Languages
- Tulu, Kannada and Sanskrit

Religion
- Hinduism; Sampradaya:Vaidika Smarthas; Veda Shakha: Rigvedi; Sootra: Ashwalayana Sutra

Sthānika Brāhmins belong to Hindu Tuluva Smartha Brahmin group.

They are the oldest Tulu Brāhmins primarily from the coastal Karnataka (Kanara) also known as Parasurama Kshetra. They are the main Prathistapanacharyas/Founders of all ancient temples of tulunadu.

They are one of the oldest brahmins of South India and are referred to in many ancient historical epigraphical inscriptions as; Buddhivantha, Sthaneekam, Sthanapanthulu, Sthanadhikari, Sthanatthar, Sthalatthar, Sthanapadiyan, Thaniker, Sthanikar, Sthānādhipathi, Sthānādhyaksha, Naga brahmins, Nager brahmins, Nagoji brahmins, Tuluva brahmins. Sthānika Brahmins of south canara are referred to as Subrahmanya Sthānika Tulu Brāhmins as Lord Subrahmanya is their kuladevata and Kukke subramanya temple was their main center until the 16th century.

Sthānika Brāhmins are followers of Advaita Philosophy and practice the Panchayatana form of worship. They are disciples of the Sri Sringeri Jagadguru Samsthanam from the time of Sri Adi Shankara.

== Caste ==
Sthānika Brahmins are a sect of Hindu vedic Smartha Brahmins.

== Etymology ==
The word Sthānika is a sanskrit word and has meanings such as 'Fixed worshiper', 'Chief priest of a temple', 'chief tantri', 'Tantraagami', 'melu shanthiyavanu','Sarva shastra paramgata', 'Manager or Administrator of temple', 'One who holds managerial position', 'Governor of a place', 'Tax collector', 'People of local place', etc. Sthānika Brahmins acquired their name owing to their managerial positions, and also as 'Chief priest of a temples' ,"Tantris", Temple administrators, tax collectors etc.

== History ==
During the first quarter of the eighteenth century A.D., the Sthanikas in Tulu speaking region of coastal Karnataka lost their reputed position because of the acute Saiva-Vaisnava (Madhva shivalli cult) rivalry, the changed political set up, the British revenue policies and as they joined their hands in freedom fights supporting the local rulers of that time.

In 1836 Dewan Lakshminarayya a Sthanika brahmin started the first Non-cooperation movement in south canara and prepared a plan to revolt against the British rule with the help of the king of Kodagu. It was called the Rebellion of kalyanaswamy (kalyanappana kaatukaayi).Till 1845, the administration & chief priesthood of all temples was with Sthanika Brahmins and had an influence over large section of the people. The Sthanika Brahmins who were at the helm of affairs in anti-British movement, were sacked from their traditional posts and their hereditary trusteeship of the temple was also cancelled. A large number of people from the community also have been hanged to death by British and the community became economically poor.

Today sthanikas being well educated and economically well positioned joining their hands establishing unity among the different subsects of Tuluva Brahmins and continue to be disciples of Sringeri Sharada Peetham.

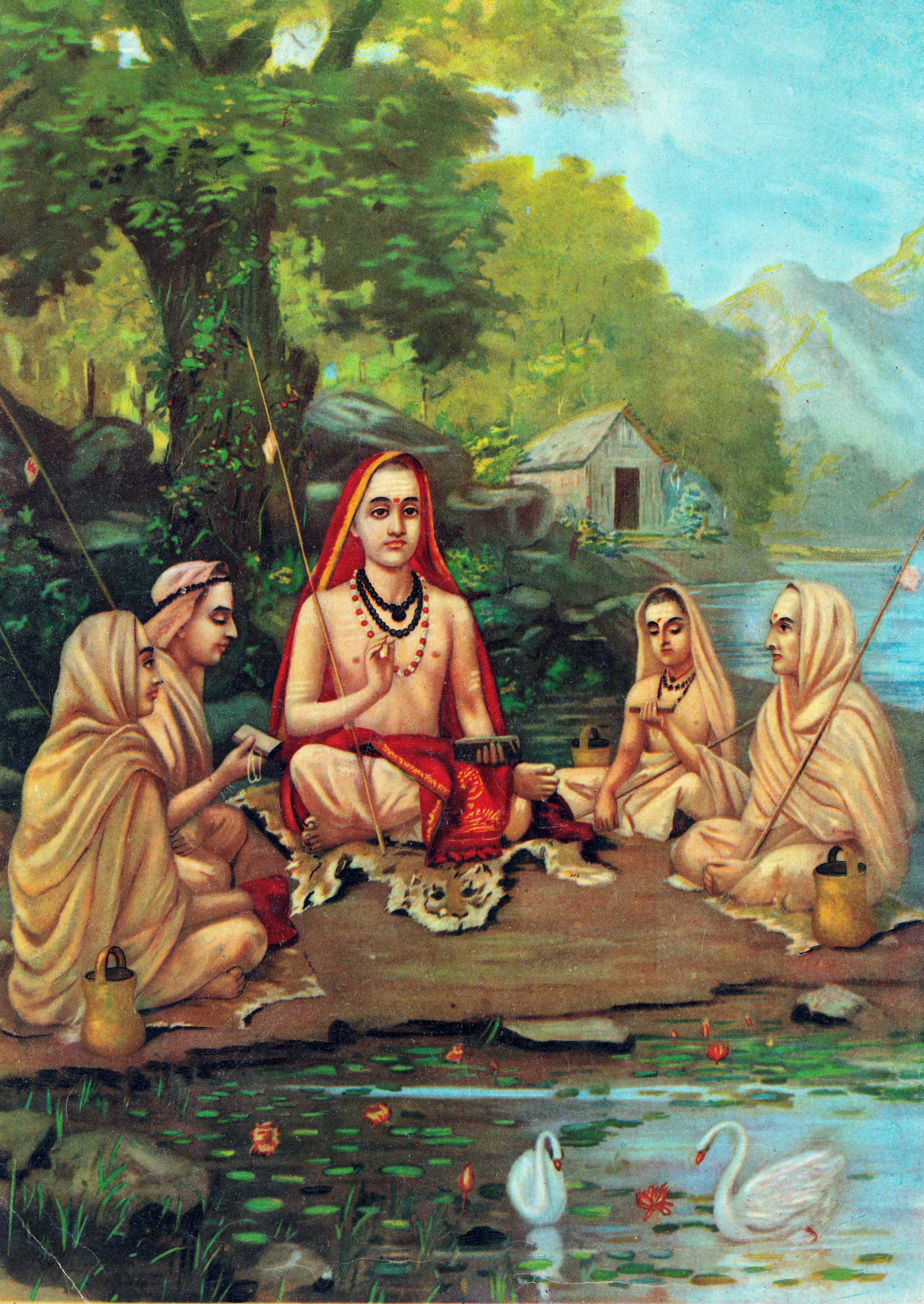
Followers of Adi Shankara

== Language and food ==
The Sthanika Brahmins' mother tongue is "Tulu", "Sanskrit" and "Kannada". They speak a different dialect of Tulu called Brahmin Tulu, unique to their community. Sthanika brahmins are purely vegetarians.

== Domestic culture ==
Attire

Traditionally, they wore a simple cloth around the waist called a Mundu, also called as veshti, in domestic settings. When they had to travel, they wore two sets of cloth in addition known as a vasthram.

Sthanika brahmins wore their traditional hair tufts (kuṭumi or śikhā or jhuttu or chundu) on the back of the crown.

== Gotra and pravara ==
The following gotras and pravaras are found in the community.

| Gotra | Pravara |
|---|---|
| Vishwāmitra | Vaishwāmitra — Devarāta — Oudala |
| Vishwāmitra | Vaishwāmitra — Mādhucchandasa- Dhānanjaya |
| Kāshyapa | Kāshyapa — Avatsāra — Naidhruva |
| Vasista | Vāsista — Indrapramada — Bharadwasu |
| Āngirasa | Āngirasa — Āmbarisha — Youvanāshwa |
| Bharadwaja | Angirasa - Bhāraspatya - Bhāradwaja |
| Bhārgava | Bhargava - Chyavana - Apnavaan |
| Atri | Ātreya - Archanānasa - Shyāvashwa |

== See also ==
- List of teachers of Advaita Vedanta
- Tuluva Brahmins
- Shri Subramanya Sabha
