= N. Krishna Pillai =

Indian dramatist and historian

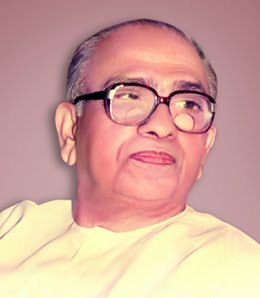
- Born: September 22, 1916; Travancore (present-day Varkala, Kerala, India)
- Died: July 10, 1988 (aged 71)
- Occupations: Playwright, critic, historian
- Spouse: Saraswathi Kunjamma
- Awards: 1958 Kerala Sahitya Akademi Award for Drama; 1972 Odakkuzhal Award; 1973 Kerala Sangeetha Nataka Akademi Award; 1979 Kerala Sahitya Akademi Fellowship; 1987 Sahitya Akademi Award; 1987 Vayalar Award; 1987 C. V. Sahitya Puraskar; Father Abraham Vadakkel Award

N. Krishna Pillai (22 September 1916 – 10 July 1988) was an Indian dramatist, literary critic, translator and historian of Malayalam language. Known for his realism and dramatic portrayal of psycho-social tensions, Pillai's plays earned him the moniker, Kerala Ibsen. He was a recipient of the Sahitya Akademi Award, Kerala Sahitya Akademi Award for Drama, Odakkuzhal Award, Vayalar Award and Kerala Sangeetha Nataka Akademi Award, besides other honours. The Kerala Sahitya Akademi inducted him as a distinguished fellow in 1979.

== Biography ==
N. Krishna Pillai was born on September 22, 1916, at Muthana, a small village near Varkala, Travancore (present-day Varkala, north of Thiruvananthapuram district, Kerala) to Kakkattu Matom Kesavar Kesavan and Chekalavilakkathuveettil Parvathy Amma. After schooling at schools in Sivagiri and Attingal, he studies at Maharaja's College, Thiruvananthapuram, now known as University College Thiruvananthapuram from where he graduated with honours in Malayalam in 1938 and started his career as a teacher of Malayalam at Sivagiri Malayalam School. He quit the job in 1940 to pursue research at the University of Kerala and in 1943, he joined The Madurai Diraviyam Thayumanavar Hindu College as a lecturer but when he received a posting as a lecturer at the University College, the next year, he returned to Thiruvananthapuram to take up the post. Later, he worked at a number of other institutions such as Government Brennen College, Thalassery as a professor, Intermediate College, Thiruvananthapuram as the principal, and as the professor of Malayalam at the University College.

N. Krishna Pillai married Azhakattu Saraswathy Kunjamma in 1943, and the couple had four daughters, Sahiti, Kala, Madhuri and Nandini, and a son, Hari. Pillai died on July 10, 1988, at Sree Chitra Tirunal Institute for Medical Sciences and Technology, at the age of 71.

== Legacy ==
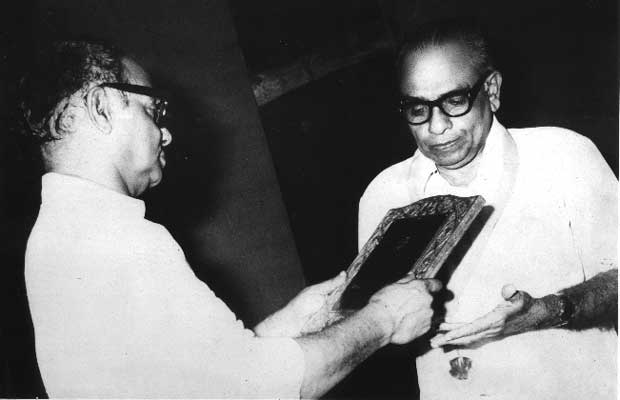
Krishna Pillai receiving the Kerala Sahitya Akademi Fellowship

The founder of modern Malayalam drama — none other than N. Krishna Pillai can be referred so. He was a genius who made Malayalam drama what it is today, said C. Radhakrishnan on N. Krishna Pillai

Krishna Pillai's oeuvre consists of 14 plays of which three were written for radio, 13 one-act plays, 7 books of children's literature, literary criticisms, historical essays and research papers. He was credited with introducing social issues into Malayalam theatre at a time when mythological operas were the standard practice.

Pillai brought a new outlook to the Malayalam drama, by omitting the farcical humour and concentrating on detailed studies of the character and the society, portrayed in drama, which earned him the moniker the Kerala Ibsen. Bhagna-Bhavanam (Broken Home) published in 1942, Kanyaka (Spinster) (1944), Balabalam (Might against might) (1946), Anuranjanam (Compromise) (1954), Mutakkumutal (Investment) (1960) and Kutathile Vilakku (Lamp inside the pot) published in 1972 are some of his notable works. He also published 11 essay compilations, two books of memoirs and interviews and 9 books of children's literature. His book, Pratipathram Bhashanabhedham, is a detailed study of the novels of C. V. Raman Pillai and the book has won a number of awards.

== Awards and honours ==
When Kerala Sahitya Akademi introduced an annual award for drama in 1958, Krishna Pillai received the inaugural award, for the work, Azhimukhathekku. His essay compilation, Theranjedutha Prabhandangal was selected for the Odakkuzhal Award in 1972 and he received the Kerala Sangeetha Nataka Akademi Award in 1973. Kerala Sahitya Akademi inducted him as a distinguished fellow in 1979 and he received the Sahitya Akademi Award in 1987; he also received the Vayalar Award and C. V. Sahitya Puraskar, in 1987. He was also a recipient of the Father Abraham Vadakkel Award.

N. Krishna Pillai Foundation, an eponymous organization, organized a three-day arts festival in Thiruvananthapuram in memory of Krishna Pillai in 2018 on the occasion of the 75th anniversary of Kanyaka one of Pillai's works. N. Krishna Pillai Memorial Cultural Center, an institution in Pillai's honour, is situated at Palayam, Thiruvananthapuram, and houses a 250-seat mini theatre and N. Krishna Pillai Memorial library, a research centre with over 8000 titles. The Foundation also organizes an annual theatre festival in his honour.

== Bibliography ==
=== Plays ===
- Krishna Pillai. N. Randu Krithikal. Kamalalaya: Kamalalaya.
- Krishna Pillai, N. N.Krishnapillayute naatakangangal. Kottayam: National Book Stall.
- Krishna Pillai, N. Aaru Prahasanangal. Kottayam: D. C. Books.
- Strindberg, August (1980). Oru Swapnanatakam or etra dukhamayam lokam. Translated by Krishna Pillai, N. Kottayam: National Book Stall.
- Krishna Pillai, N. (1990). N.Krishnapillayute Lakhu Naatakangangal. Kottayam: D. C. Books.
- Krishna Pillai, N. (1972). Maruppacha. Kottayam: Sahitya Pravarthaka Co-operative Society.
- Krishna Pillai, N. (1942). Bhagnabhavanam. Kottayam: Sahitya Pravarthaka Co-operative Society.
- Krishna Pillai, N. (1945). Balabalam. Kottayam: Sahitya Pravarthaka Co-operative Society.
- Krishna Pillai, N. (1950). Anuranjanam. Kottayam: Sahitya Pravarthaka Co-operative Society.
- Krishna Pillai, N. (1956). Azhimukhathekku. Trivendrum: Nandanam.
- Krishna Pillai, N. (1953). Mutakkumuthal. Kottayam: Sahitya Pravarthaka Co-operative Society.
- Krishna Pillai, N (2008). N Krishna Pillayude naatakangal sampoornam. Kottayam, D C Books. ISBN 9788126421046.

=== Essays ===
- Krishna Pillai, N. (2010). Kairaliyude katha. Kottayam: D C Books. ISBN 9788126405091.
- Krishna Pillai, N. (1992). Kalidasan mutal O. N. V. vare. Kottayam: D. C. Books.
- Krishna Pillai, N. (1994). Prathipaathram bhashanabhedam. Kottayam: D. C. Books.
- Krishna Pillai, N. (1990). Akapporul thedi. Trichur: Kerala Sahitya Akademi.
- Krishna Pillai, N. (1983). Thiranjedutha prabhandhangal. Kottayam: Sahitya Pravarthaka Sahakarana Sangam.
- Krishna Pillai, N (1991). Adiverukal.
- Krishna Pillai, N (1990). Akapporul thedi.
- Krishna Pillai, N (1998). Anubhavangal abhimathangal.
- Krishna Pillai, N (1989). Niroopanarangam.

=== Translations ===
- Émile Zola (1980). Kalangam. Translated by N. Krishna Pillai. Quilon: M. S. B. Depot.
- Hugo, Victor (1994). Irulum velichavum. Translated by N. Krishna Pillai. Trivendrum: State Institute of Children's Literature.

=== Memoirs ===
- Krishna Pillai, N. (1989). Priyasmaranakal. Kottayam: D.C.Books.
