= Kerala Bhasha Institute =

Indian academic publishing house

- Established: 1968 Sep 16
- Director: Dr. Sathian M
- Location: Thiruvananthapuram, Kerala, India
- Website: https://www.keralabhashainstitute.org

The Kerala Bhasha Institute is an academic publishing house in India that was established on 11 March 1968 as a part of the fourth five-year plan. Twelve years later, on 1 November 1980, a regional center was set up in Kozhikode. It is located in Thiruvananthapuram in Kerala. It publishes books on science and technology, the arts, literature, folklore and information technology. In addition to book publication, the institute also runs translation camps, book festivals, computer training and seminars.

== History ==
The first publications of the institute included 16 glossaries (shabdaavali) including a Vijnaanashabdaavali and a Maanavikashabdaavali. Such glossaries were made in keeping with the guidelines for technical terminology put in place by a standing commission dealing with the production of scientific and technological glossaries. This was largely the result of the work done by the Kerala Sasthra Sahitya Parishad during 1967-69

The then Minister of Education Sree Triguna Sen inaugurated the functions of Kerala Bhasha Institute at Kanakakkunnu Palace, Thiruvananthapuram on 16 September 1968.

In 1996, then the Computer Book Series scheme was initiated, the Institute changed its policies with regard to its glossaries. They also rewrote the Malayalam Shorthand Manual, and are involved in the work of publishing the complete works of famous authors and comprehensive study books.

On the anvil are plans to develop a mechanism for recording dictation in Malayalam as is currently available in English, a ‘work bench’ for translators, a system for providing the Vijnaanakairali magazine and other publications on mobile phones and a plan to develop a CD and tutoring system for language study.

== Aim ==
1. Developing Malayalam into an effective medium of communication for modern scientific and technological knowledge
2. Prepare Malayalam text books for higher education and for reinventing the language so as to enable it to adapt to the changing needs of the times

== Awards and honors ==
1. N. V. Sahitya Award for 'Keralthily Chumar Chitrangal' (Mural paintings in Kerala) - M. G. Shashibhooshan
2. Naalappadu Award for Adipra Roopangal by M. Leelavathi.
