= P. K. Parameswaran Nair =

Biographer

P. K. Parameswaran Nair (1903-1988) was a biographer, critic, essayist and literary historian. He wrote a history of Malayalam literature. He is also known for writing a biography of Mahatma Gandhi.

== Works ==
Parameswaran Nair established himself as a biographer, critic, essayist and literary historian. His biographies on C. V. Raman Pillai and 'Sahithyapanchananan' stand out as literary masterpieces in Malayalam and his definitive biography of Mahatma Gandhi is considered a classic by itself. He has written on Voltaire, Napoleon and a host of similar great personalities. His 'History of Malayalam Literature' published by Kendra Sahithya Academy had been translated into almost all the major Indian languages besides English. He has a number of essays and critical studies collected together in about half a dozen volumes. A staunch Gandhian in words and deeds he did yeoman service to propagate Gandhian ideals among the masses and was closely associated with the 'Kerala Gandhi Smaraka Nidhi' in its several activities particularly in the publication of the seven volume 'Selected writings of Gandhiji'.

== Memory ==
A trust named Parameswaran Nair Smaraka Trust was formed in 1991 in his memory. The trust has gone from strength to strength over its last twenty eight years of inception, giving awards such as the Parameswaran Nair Smaraka award to the best biographer in Malayalam literature and the Professor Guptan Nair Smaraka award for the best critique in Malayalam literature on 25 November every year. The P. K. Parameswaran Nair Smaraka Trust strives to preserve the ideals upheld by its eponymous author.
