= Asian Educational Services =

India-based publishing house

Asian Educational Services (AES)
- Type: Publishing house specialized in antiquarian reprints
- Industry: Publishing
- Founded: 1973
- Founder: Jagdish Lal Jetley
- Headquarters: New Delhi (India)
- Area served: Worldwide
- Key people: Gautam Jetley
- Products: Books
- Number of employees: 37
- Website: www.asianeds.com

Asian Educational Services (AES) is a New Delhi, India-based publishing house that specialises in antiquarian reprints of books that were originally published between the 17th and early 20th centuries. Founded by Jagdish Lal Jetley in 1973, the firm had published more than 1200 books by 2016.

== Publishing programme ==
This firm has a very active publication programme that aims to preserve knowledge, in the form of old books, from being lost. An extensive list of about 200 travelogues gives a vivid picture of India specifically, and Asia generally. Many of the big names in Asian exploration and in the field of history have been reprinted. Travelogues of people who, in the Middle Ages, frequented India have been also given a new lease on life by being reprinted by AES.

Language aids for over 40 Asian, European and African languages in the form of dictionaries (classical, and popular), polyglots, grammar aids, and self-taught series are part of the AES programme for language studies. All major languages of the Indian sub-continent have been covered, along with Semitic languages like Amharic and the Arabic family of languages.

Apart from India, other areas of publication activity involve Sri Lanka, Nepal, Bhutan, Tibet, Himalayas, Central Asia, Burma/Myanmar, and the Indian Ocean. Subjects dealt with include history, customs and manners, religion, Buddhism, numismatics, anthropology, art, architecture, castes and tribes, the Indian Revolt (also known as the Mutiny of 1857), natural history, gazetteers, guidebooks, etc.

== Authors published ==
- Philippus Baldaeus
- François Bernier
- Al-Biruni
- Richard Francis Burton
- Abbé Barthélemy Carré
- Robert Caesar Childers
- Alexander Csoma de Kőrös
- Ippolito Desideri
- George William Forrest
- John Fryer
- Wilhelm Geiger
- Nicholas Greenwood
- Alexander Hamilton
- Sven Hedin
- W. W. Hunter
- Edward William Lane
- G. B. Malleson
- Niccolao Manucci
- Monier-Willams
- Father Antonio Monserrate
- William Moorcroft
- William Muir
- Max Müller
- John Nieuhoff
- Hermann Oldenberg
- John Ovington
- Marco Polo
- James Prinsep
- Thomas William Rhys Davids
- Herbert Hope Risley
- Vincent Arthur Smith
- Aurel Stein
- Francis Joseph Steingass
- Jean-Baptiste Tavernier
- James Emerson Tennent
- Edgar Thurston
- Hiuen Tsang
- William of Rubruck
- Arminius Vambery
- Francis Younghusband

== Recent developments ==
AES was awarded the National Award for Excellence in Publishing in 2005.

AES has been featured regularly in newspapers and TV shows, that highlight its re-publication programme. The newspapers that have carried stories on AES include the national dailies like The Hindu and The Indian Express. Among the channels that have features AES are the National Channel of India (Door Darshan 1) and the CNN/IBN network in India.

After the death of the founder, Jagdish Lal Jetley, in 2005, the firm was being run by the surviving family, including the founder's son Gautam Jetley.
