= V. Nagam Aiya =

Dewan of Travancore

Dewan Bahadur Veereraghavapuram Nagam Aiya
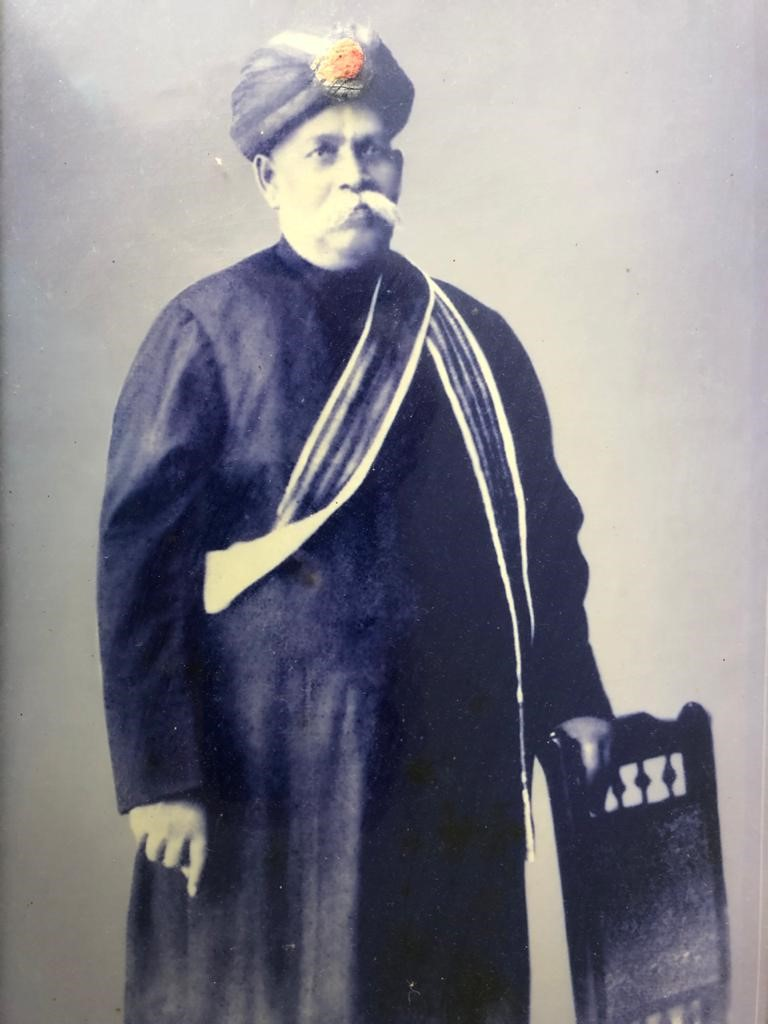
- Portrait

Dewan Peishkar of Travancore
- In office 1870–1906

Personal details
- Born: Veeraraghavapuram Nagam Aiya; 1850 Veeraraghavapuram, Madras Presidency, British India
- Died: 1917 (aged 66–67)
- Children: Lalitha, Janaki
- Education: Maharajah's College, Madras University
- Occupation: Civil servant; administrator; chronicler

Diwan Bahadur Veeraraghavapuram Nagam Aiya (c. 1850 December – 1917) was an Indian civil servant and chronicler who served as the Dewan of the erstwhile princely state of Travancore. He authored the Travancore State Manual.

== Early life ==
Nagam Aiya was born in December 1850 at Veeraraghavapuram - a small village on the banks of the river Thambrapurni, in the Tirunelveli district of Tamil Nadu. He was a Telugu Brahmin of the "Aruveli Neogi " sub-caste. According to traditional accounts which cover seven generations before him, the family which had originally belonged to "Boppudi," a village in the Krishna District of Andhra Pradesh had migrated to Nellore, Trichinopoly, Madura, Tirunelveli and finally Travancore. His ancestors migrated to Travancore in the second half of 18th century and was in the service of the Maharajah in various capacities. One of his ancestors was a "Sthanapatter" or Ambassador of the Maharajah of Travancore. In Mysore at Tipu Sultan's court, on another account, one of this forefathers was said to have been murdered by Velu Thampi Dalawa.

Nagam Aiya was brought to Thiruvananthapuram while he was a child. He had his entire education in H.H. The Maharajah's High School and the direct tutorship of European School masters like Mr. John Bensley, and College at Trivamdrum. In these institutions, he was under Mr. John Ross, and Dr. Robert Harvey, the two teachers who guided him in his studies for F.A and B.A examinations. He is said to have been a very brilliant student. He passed his Matriculation in 1865 and his F.A in 1866. He was the first graduate from the Maharajah's College (University College) in February 1870. Due to the poverty of his family he was forced to join the government service as a clerk on a meagre pay of Rs 7/- soon after his Matriculation examination. Later his success as the first student to complete a full B.A program brought him to the notice of H.H Sri Ayilyam Tirunal and he was then appointed as the Asst. Prof. of History and Mathematics in his alma mater.

== In the Travancore service ==
Flag of Kingdom of Travancore

Kingdom of Travancore in India

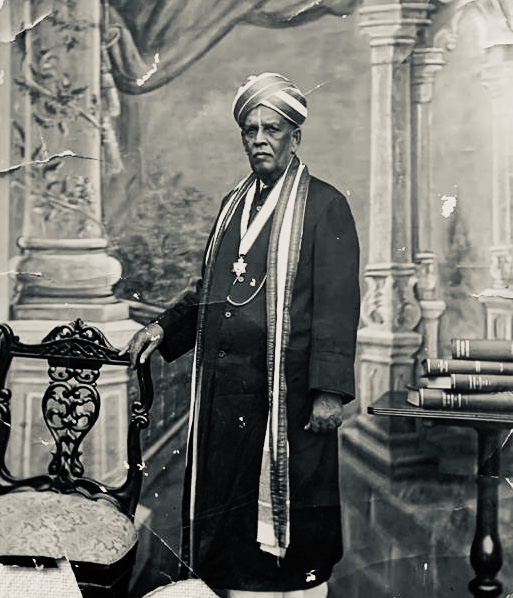

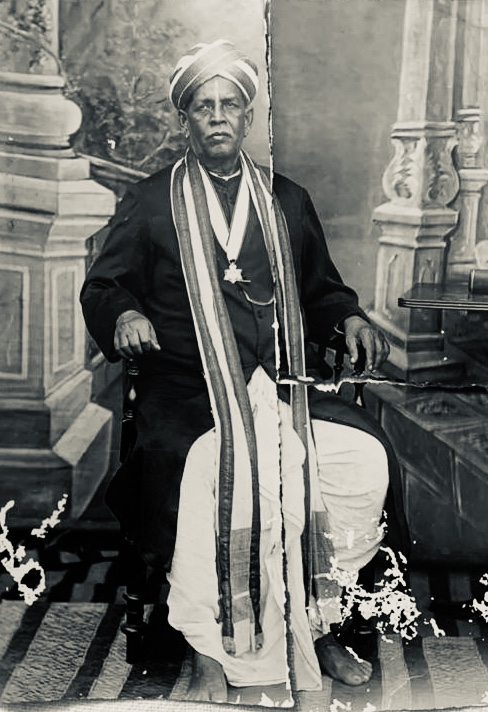

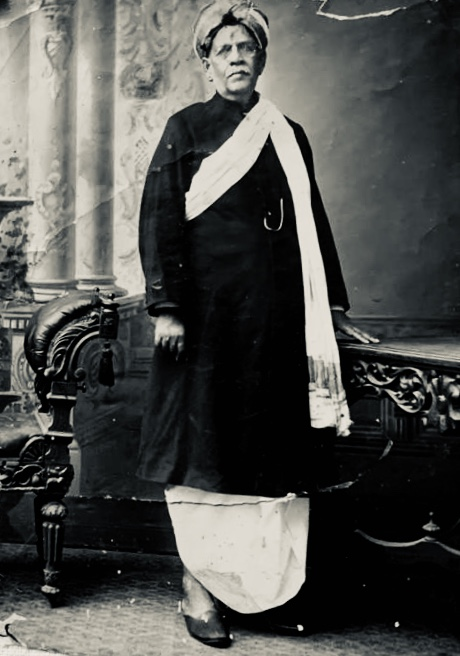
V. Nagam Aiya (C.1880)

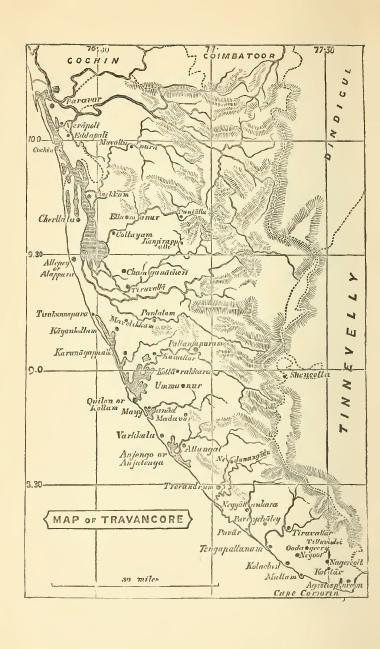
Map of Travancore in 1871

Soon the then Diwan, Sir T. Madhava Rao, appointed him as a clerk on a pay of Rs. 50/- in Dewan's Huzur English Office, a much desired destination for a migrant Brahmin. The Dewan's Administrative Report for 1870 says "Only one candidate went up for the B.A degree in February 1870 and was successful, the first whom we can claim as a student entirely trained in the school. This young man (V.Nagam Aiya) has since been employed in the Dewan's Office where he affords satisfaction in the discharge of his duties". His rise in the official career was rapid since then. In 1872 he was appointed as a Tahsildar.

In 1880 he became Deputy Peishcar and in 1883 he was promoted as The Dewan Peishcar, at the age of 24 he conducted the first census operations in Travancore. He had been in that position for 11 years and was the Acting Dewan for Travancore on five occasions. He was selected as Dewan by H.H.. Sri Mulam Tirunal in 1904 to succeed him. He retired after a long career of 38 years of Government service, in February 1908. Besides his routine official duties he was also given the additional charge of many other responsibilities. In 1878, 1881 & 1891 he was in-charge of the Census operation in the State. By preparing the Census Report of 1875, he could become the writer of the First Census Report of Travancore. One report of his earlier career says "Kottayam marvel at its 'Boy Tahsildar' whose official duties no more oppressed him than games do a school boy". The then Dewan, A. Sashiah Shastri wrote "In the course of executing work entrusted to him, he has displayed superior intelligence, great tact for organizing, instructing and controlling a large and special agency which the necessities of work called for". He was also in charge of the Revenue Survey and Settlement in 1892.

Another important responsibility entrusted to him was the preparation of the first Gazetteer of Travancore, namely, Travancore State Manual, He was appointed as a full-time State Manual Officer on deputation in 1904. In the Govt. order served to him he was requested to prepare the State Manual after the model of the District Manuals in Madras Presidency. He could successfully complete his compilation work by 1906 in 3 volumes, which we are now reprinting. a He was a nominated member of the Travancore Legislative Council during 1892–99, and 1905–1908. In 1892 he was also selected as a Fellow of the Royal Historic College of London. In recognition of his meritorious service to the State and its people, he was awarded the title of Dewan Bahadur by the Government in January 1910. He died in 1917 at Trivandrum, at the age of 67.

== Major Contributions, shaping modern day Kerala ==
Thiruvananthapuram, the capital of Kerala once referred by the British as Trivandrum, had also been the capital of Travancore. Travancore, Cochin and the Malabar, three major regions of Kerala amalgamated in 1956 to what we now know as "Kerala". Travancore became the second most prosperous princely state in British India, with reputed achievements in education, political administration, public work and social reforms. The Kingdom of Travancore (/ˈtrævənkɔːr/) (Thiruvithamkoor) was an Indian kingdom from c.870 CE until 1949 CE. It was ruled by the Travancore Royal Family from Padmanabhapuram, and later Thiruvananthapuram. At its zenith, the kingdom covered most of modern-day central and southern Kerala with the Thachudaya Kaimal's enclave of Irinjalakuda Koodalmanikkam temple in the neighbouring Kingdom of Cochin, as well as the district of Kanyakumari, now in the Indian state of Tamil Nadu. The official flag of the state was red with a dextrally-coiled silver conch shell (Turbinella pyrum) at its center. In the early 19th century, the kingdom became a princely state of the British Empire. The Travancore Government took many progressive steps on the socio-economic front and during the reign of Maharajah Sri Chithira Thirunal Balarama Varma, In 1903-1904 the total revenue of the state was Rs.1,02,01,900.

In light of the socio-economic progress & development, The Maharajah of Tranvancore, Rama Varma entrusted Diwan V. Nagam Aiya with developing the 'Travancore State Manual' which encompasses various administrative and economic affairs, and resources of the Kingdom, and which follows the model of the district manuals of the Madras presidency, under the English rule.

Diwan V. Nagam Aiya mentions that the idea had been ‘broached’ to him by Dewan T. Rama Row, C.I.E., some fourteen years earlier. At that time, Nagam Aiya had been working as the Dewan Peishcar and District Magistratein 1901. Nagam Aiya did a lot of pioneering and original research and work to obtain a lot of information for the preparation of this work. What came out was a books of ‘encyclopaedic nature spread over a space of more than 1820 pages of letter-press’ over 3 Volumes, which are in publication even to this day, and available on various sources including Amazon.

It might be correct to think that Nagam Aiya did have this project in his mind, and he must have collected or at least noted down a lot of information much before he started on this work, however. He started his work on this project as a full-time officer from December 1904.

== The Travancore State Manual ==
Diwan V. Nagam Aiya's work in 1906, the Travancore State Manual is a huge volume of history (1820 pages, published in three volumes of 648, 592 and 580 pages respectively) not only on the antiquity of Travancore, but also of various other features of the place. The works along with history also contains detailed study and examination of the physical features, geology, climate, rainfall, meteorology, flora, fauna, and archaeology of Travancore State at the time.

The manuals includes details such as the geographical location, boundaries, shape and area of the landscape, mountains, plateaus, mountain passes, rivers, canal and backwaters, coastline, ports, shipping facilities, economic geology of the place, climate, rainfall, meteorology, trees, and medicinal plants, flowering and ornamental plants, birds and animals etc., archaeology, architecture, sculpture, coins, inscriptions, forts and military works, ‘Archaeology’, ‘Fauna’, census and population, language, economic condition and various other things are dealt with, in a manner that should astound. There are a number of photographs. Apart from that, there are many pictures of the stone inscriptions collected from various parts of the kingdom. The latter part of the book deals in detail on the history of the localities that were later to be joined to form Travancore kingdom. The delineation of history starts from the Parasurama legend. This legend is also mentioned in great detail. Then it slowly moves to the times of the Perumals.

Mentions about the Malabar and Travancore coasts in the ancient maritime trade records are seen sourced out.

Sections on history deals with the ancient kings. There is a mention of a Kurava King, who seems to have been assassinated in a premeditated conspiracy.

There are other details on items such as early missionaries, neighbouring kingdoms, accounts of travellers, Portuguese in Malabar and Travancore, Ettuvittial Pillamaar, Marthanda Varma, Zamorin, small kings and kingdoms north of Travancore, small-time rulers of Malabar, the attacks and occupation attempts by Sultan Tipu etc.

Velu Thampi Dalawa's rebellion is dealt with in details. Even though there is sympathy for the person, in a profound analysis, Nagam Aiya does not find his cause correct or praiseworthy. The proclamation made by Velu Thampi from Kundara is quoted in an elaborate manner. However, a full reading of the same would not find it to be in sync with modern Indian aspirations.

"Velu Tampi was a daring and clever though unscrupulous man. Rebellion was his forte."

"His favourite modes of punishment were: imprisonment, confiscation of property, public flogging, cutting off the palm of the hand, the ears or the nose, impalement or crucifying people by driving down nails on their chests to trees, and such like, too abhorrent to record here."

All rulers of Travancore, since the reign of King Marthanda Varma are dealt in reasonable detail. Swathi Thirunal's (King Rama Varma) tragic life has been mentioned.

== His goals ==
Diwan V. Nagam Aiya admitted in his works that his goal was to cover an expansive amount of information pertaining to the Kingdom, in ways that had never been undertaken in the past. He wrote "In the writing of this book, my aim has been to present to an utter stranger to Travancore, such a picture of the land and its people, its natural peculiarities, its origin, its art, history and administration, its forests and animals, its conveniences for residence or travel, its agricultural, commercial, industrial, educational and economic activities, its ethnological, social and religious features in ways he may not himself be able to form or learn over a 30 years study or residence in it. If this is a correct view of the objective of a manual, I trust that I may be permitted to entertain the hope that a fairly successful debut has been made, notwithstanding defects or shortcomings that may exist, especially as this is only a pioneer attempt in a novel direction".

His position had him run in the circles of many of the pioneers of various fields at that time including Raja Ravi Verma, a historic Indian painter, who mentions his interactions with Nagam Aiya over 15 times in "The diary of C. Raja Raja Varma", including meeting Nagam Aiya at his bungalow and H.H. Maharaja's palace on several occasions between 15 August 1901 and 18 September 1903 through 1904 as mentioned in the diary.
