= Prateeksha Kashi =

Indian Kuchipudi dancer

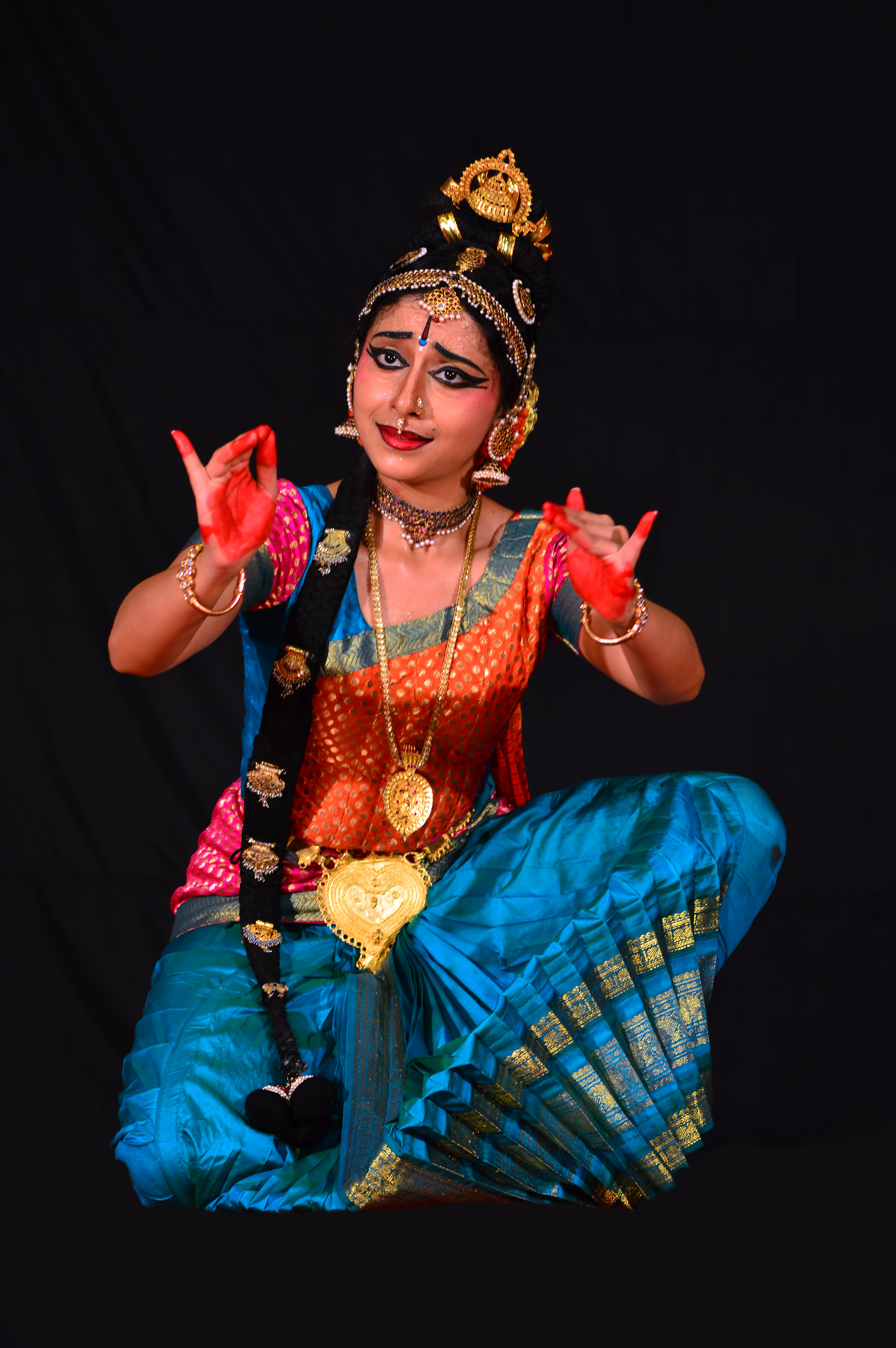
- Prateeksha performing Kuchipudi dance in Pattambi, Kerala, on 17 January 2016
- Born: May 29, 1990 (age 36); Bangalore, Karnataka, India
- Education: B.M.S. Institute of Technology and Management
- Occupations: Dancer and actress
- Known for: Kuchipudi dancer
- Parents: Vijay Kashi (father); Vyjayanthi Kashi (mother)
- Website: www.prateekshakashi.com

Prateeksha Kashi (born 29 May 1990) is an Indian Kuchipudi dancer.

== Early life ==
Prateeksha was born on 29 May 1990 in Bangalore, Karnataka, India, into the family of Gubbi Veeranna. She is the daughter of the Kuchipudi dancer Vyjayanthi Kashi and Vijaya Kashi, a television and theatre artist. She began learning Kuchipudi at the age of five under the guidance of her mother. By the age of thirteen, she had completed her Kuchipudi dance certificate examinations. She graduated from B.M.S. Institute of Technology and Management with a degree in Computer Science Engineering.

== Career ==
=== In acting ===
Prateeksha portrayed the female lead role in Priyamanasam, a Sanskrit film based on the life of Malayalam poet Unnayi Variyar. She also played the lead role, Mohini, in a Kannada serial titled Kaadambari Kanaja, which was telecast on Udaya TV. Additionally, she played the lead role of Akkamahadevi in Hejjegurthugalu. She appeared alongside her mother in Mathana.

Prateeksha was featured in a short film series on social awareness, titled Dwar: Door for Transformation. She acted in a Kannada film, Prakruthi, which won the National Award for Adaptive Screenplay in 2013 and received the Special Jury Award at the Bangalore International Film Festival in 2014.

=== Productions ===
Prateeksha was featured in The Magic of Kuchipudi, a dance DVD produced by Shambhavi Dance Theatre. The DVD was released by Yamini Krishnamurthy as a part of Nayika-Excellence Personified, which was organized on the occasion of the International Women's Day on 8 March 2014 at Bharatiya Vidhya Bhavan, Bangalore. She choreographed and presented Jiddu Krishnamurti's teachings in the production Essence of Life, a multimedia production by Dega Deva Kumar Reddy that aimed to spread Krishnamurti's teachings, and performed "Can We Live Without Problems."

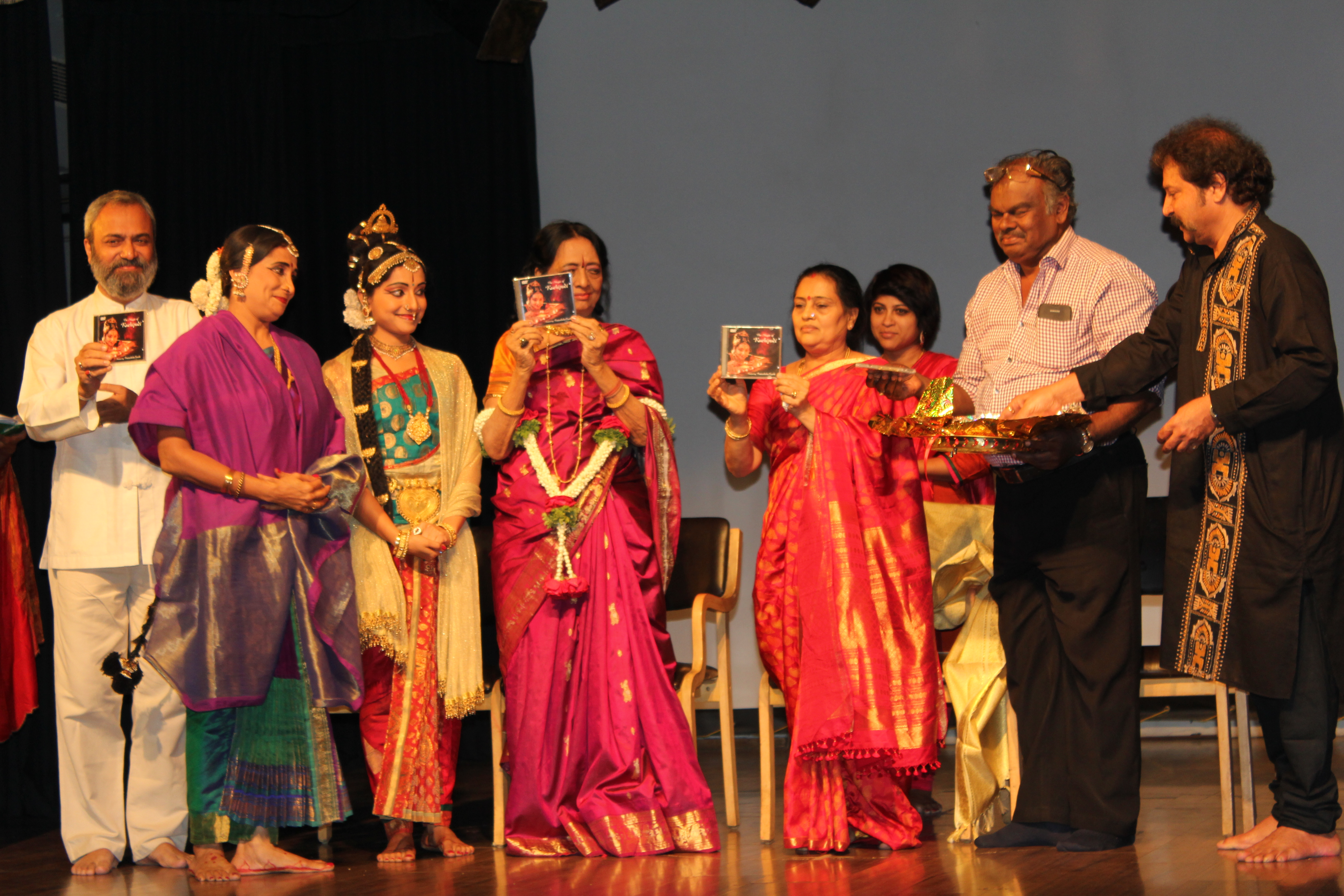
The Magic of Kuchipudi dance DVD featuring Prateeksha, produced by Shambhavi Dance Theatre

Essence of Life
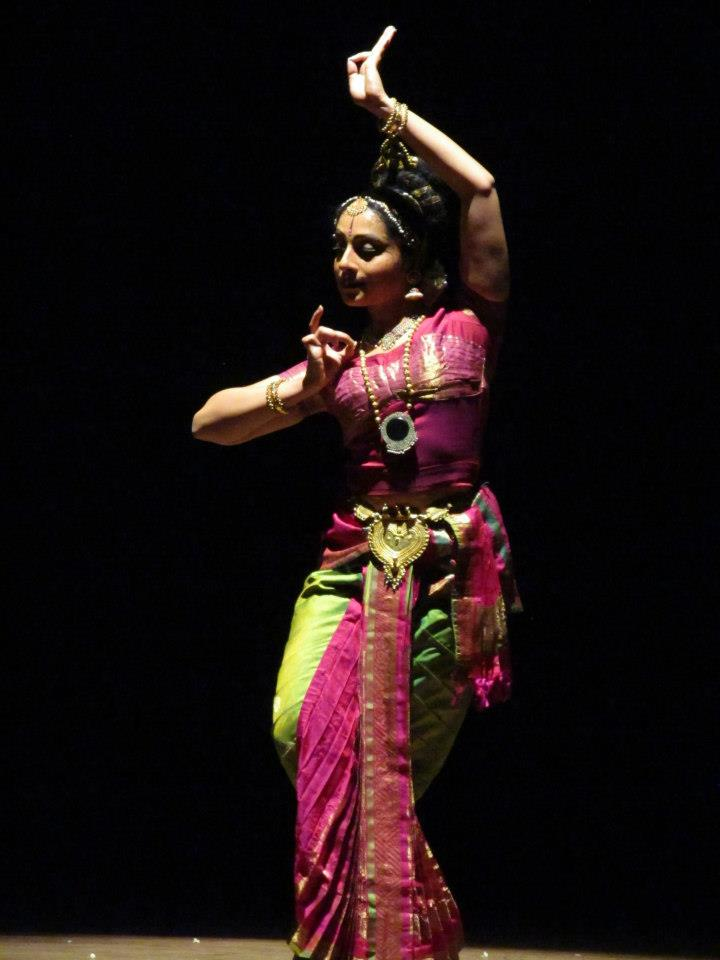
Prateeksha in the dance group Essence of Life

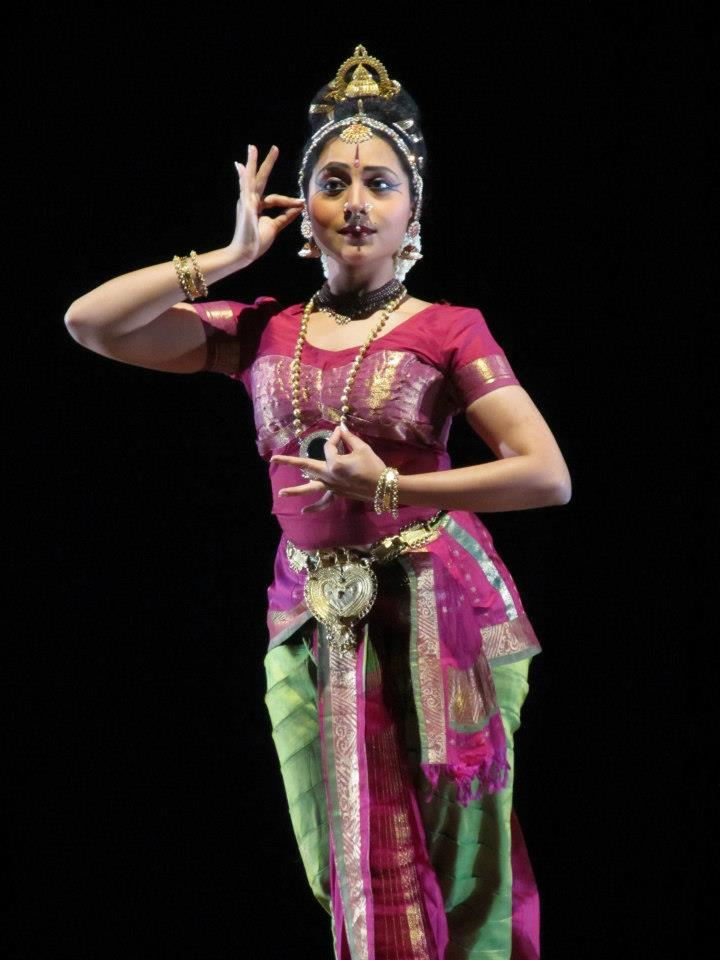
Prateeksha did the choreography for Jiddu Krishnamurti's concept "Can We Live Without Problems" as a part of Essence of Life.

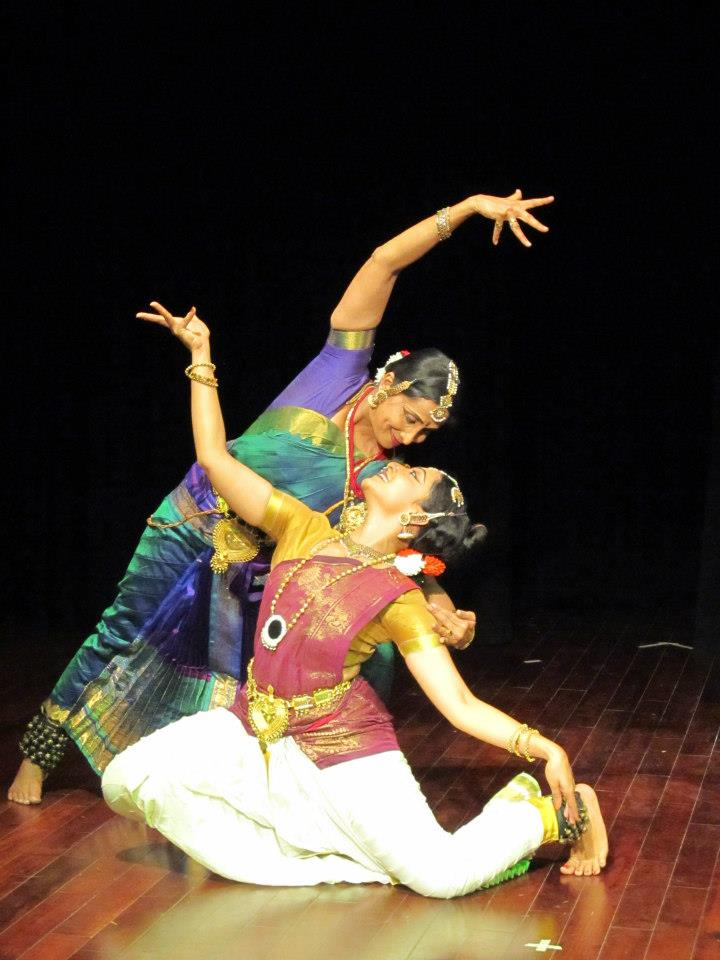
Prateeksha performing "Navarasa" with her mother, 2012

== Notable performances ==
Prateeksha has performed in numerous Indian dance festivals, including:

- Antarjatika Nrutya Sangeet Samaroha 2012, Cuttack
- Kalabharathi National Young Dance Fest 2013, Thrissur, Kerala
- World Dance Day 2013 in Alliance Francaise, Bangalore, and Chennai
- Summer Festival 2013, Coonoor, Ooty, Tamil Nadu
- Kuchipudi and Bharathanatyam duet performance with Rukmini Vijayakumar
- Natya Vriksha Young Dancers Festival, Natya Vriksha, in collaboration with UNESCO, Sangeet Natak Akademi and Ministry of Culture, celebrates World Dance Day

=== Overseas performances ===
Prateeksha has also performed overseas, including:

- US & Canada Tour for Kuchipudi Performances and Workshops
- Kuchipudi Faculty at Dance India-Milapfest 2014, Liverpool Hope University
- Festivals of India 2014 India-China Year of Friendly Exchange, China
- Sydney Dance Festival of Indian Classical Dances by Madhuram Academy of Performing Arts & Bharathiya Vidhya Bhavan, Australia

== Awards and recognition ==
Prateeksha has received awards and recognition, including:

- Leader of a Kuchipudi dance group tour to Africa, sponsored by the Indian Council for Cultural Relations (ICCR).
- One of 100 delegates selected by the Government of India as part of the India–China Year of Friendly Exchanges 2014.
- Grade ‘A’ artiste of Doordarshan, Bangalore.

Prateeksha was selected for the Ustad Bismillah Khan Yuva Puraskar of the Sangeet Natak Akademi, New Delhi. In 2011, she received the 37th annual Aryabhata International Award for excellence in Kuchipudi. She holds the titles Nalanda Nritya Nipuna, instituted by the Nalanda Dance Research Centre, and Nritya Jyoti, awarded at the Naveen Kalakar.

Prateeksha won the dance competition conducted by Pandit Jasraj's Foundation in New York. She is a recipient of a scholarship from the Ministry of Culture, Government of India. In 2014, she was honoured with the Aditya Vikram Birla Kalakiran Puraskar in the field of dance by the Government of Maharashtra. She is an empanelled artist of the Indian Council for Cultural Relations, Government of India.
