= Shambhavi School of Dance =

Coordinates: 12.91121°N 77.47679°E

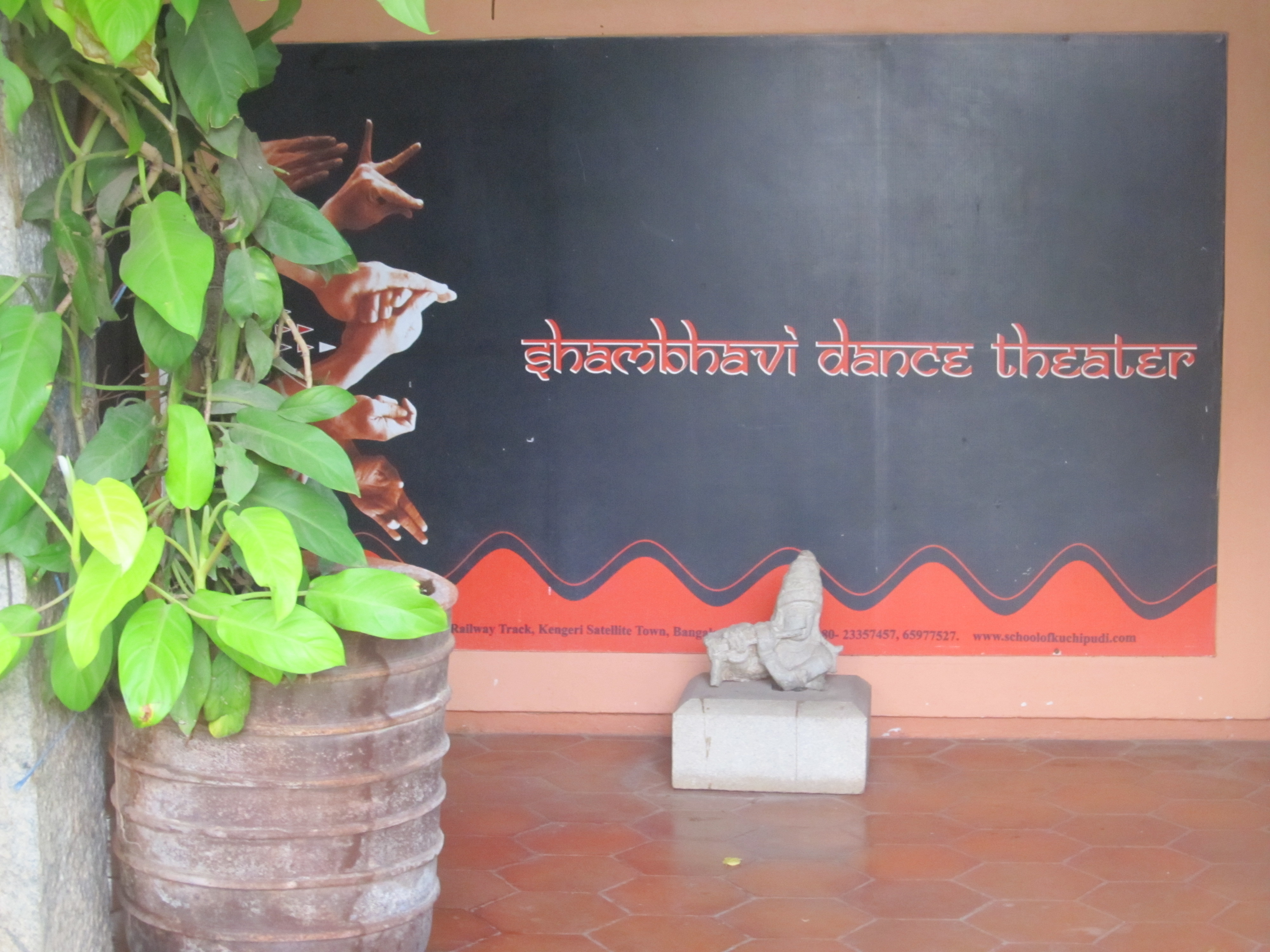
- Kengeri, Bangalore, Karnataka, India

Information
- School type: Dance & Music School
- Motto: "Exploring the horizons of D A N C E !reaching out to all generations..."
- Established: 1993
- Website: http://www.schoolofkuchipudi.com/

Shambhavi School of Dance is a dance school established in 1993 in Kengeri, Bangalore, Karnataka, India as a Gurukul for the study and practice of Indian classical dance and music. The Artistic Director of this school is Smt.Vyjayanthi Kashi who is an exponent of the Kuchipudi dance form.

== Activities ==
Shambhavi School of Dance provides a platform for artists associated with Indian classical dance and music.

== Achievements ==
- Every year, Shambhavi School of Dance organises "Dance Jathre" - India's first ever International Dance Fair, at which workshops are conducted on various dance forms. The fair also includes performances by a range artists from all over India.
- Shambhavi School of Dance organised "Nayika- Excellence Personified" on International Women's Day, which includes the seminar "Contribution of women to Kuchipudi". Additionally, the "Natya Shastra" Award was conferred to Dansuse Padma Bhushan Dr. Yamini Krishnamurthy (2014).
- World Dance Day Celebrations 2016
