= Essence of Life (dance group) =

Indian classical dance group

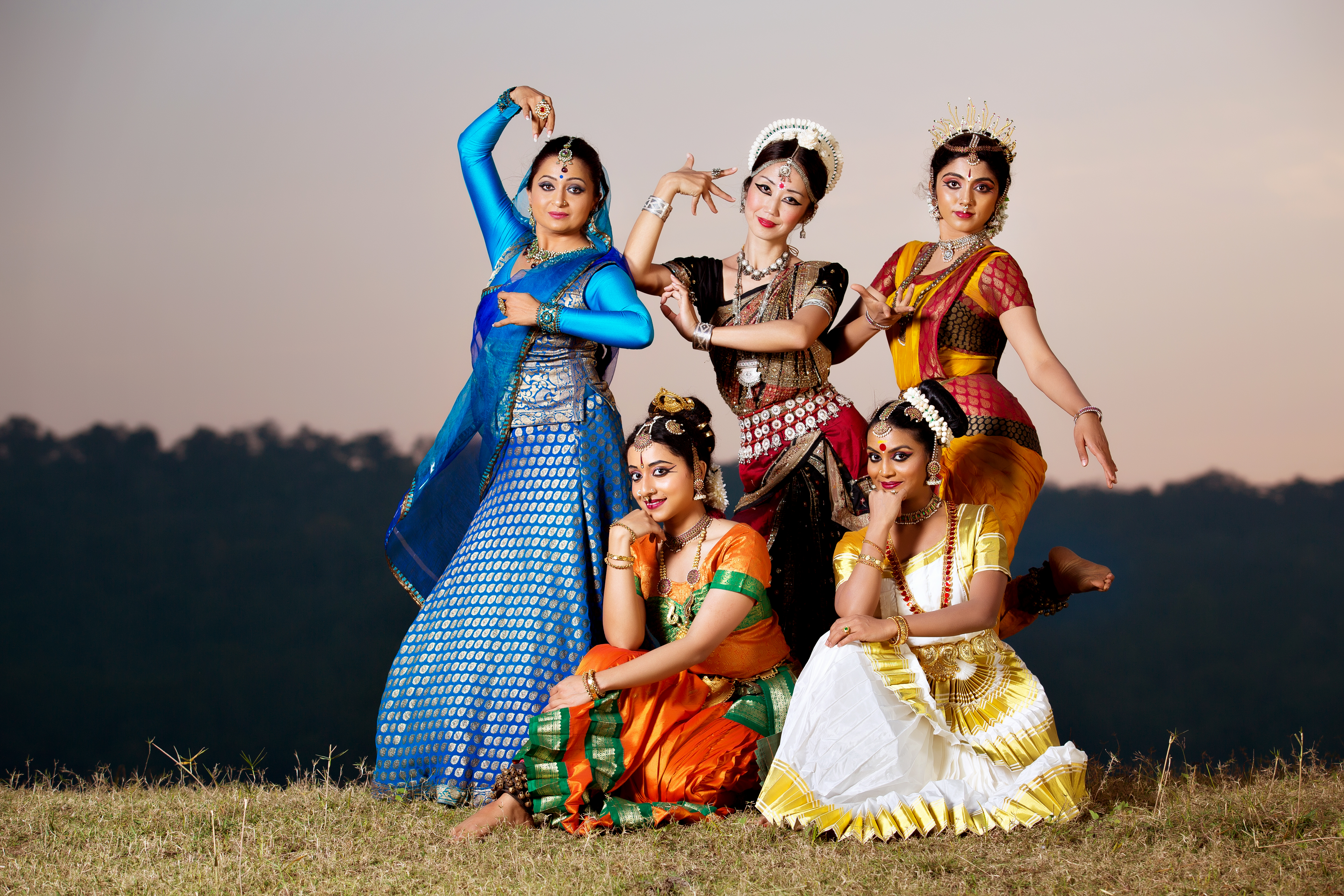
- Essence of Life dance form
- Formation: 2012
- Founder: Dega Deva Kumar Reddy
- Purpose: Dance Group for Indian classical dance sharing teachings of Jiddu Krishnamurti
- Location: India
- Parent organization: The Pathless Land
- Affiliations: Jiddu Krishnamurti

Essence of Life is a performing art group based in Bangalore, established by Dega Deva Kumar Reddy in 2012 to promote teachings of Jiddu Krishnamurti.

Essence of Life is a synergy of five Indian classical dance forms - Bharatanatyam, Kuchipudi, Odissi, Kathak and Mohiniyattam. The group organized several dance performances across India in the past decade.

== Naming ==
The name "Essence of Life" is inspired from Jiddu Krishnamurti's quote "Meditation is not a separate thing from life; it is the very essence of life, the very essence of daily living".

== Philosophy ==
Inspired by Jiddu Krishnamurti's teachings, Dega Deva Kumar Reddy conceptualized and produced 'Essence of Life'. The dance form is based on basic human problems and emotions that Jiddu Krishnamurti often addressed in his talks and books - fear, suffering, jealousy, violence, hurt, love and death.

Prominent artists from established music and dance traditions across India came together to communicate Krishnamurti's teachings through Bharatanatyam, Kuchipudi, Odissi, Kathak and Mohiniyattam.

== Theme ==
=== Art of Meditation ===
Dhyanasya Amukham - Introduction to Meditation Dhyanasya Puravrttam - Myths of Meditation Katham Jaagriti Jaayate - How does awareness come about Dhyana kala - The art of meditation Dhyanaartha kim yatharta maunam - What is true silence which leads to meditation

=== Essence of Life ===
Manovignaanam - Understanding our mind Bhayaatah svatantramah - Freedom from fear Samsayaa vina saadhyam kim jeevanam - Can we live without problem Kim saadyam pumsaam parivarthanam - Can human being change Rather saundaryam - Beauty of love

=== Finale ===
Thillana - Freedom from self

== Dance form ==
=== Dance form | Ragam ===
- Bharatanatyam - Charukesi
- Kuchipudi - Surya & Huseni Kouns
- Kathak - Madhumad Sarang
- Odissi - Mishra Lavangi
- Mohiniyattam - Madhumad Sar

== Artists and Musicians ==
=== Concept ===
- Dega Deva Kumar Reddy, Conceptualized and produced
- B Aruna Sivarama Krishna, Conceptual designer and music composer
- Dr Thiagarajan, Sanskrit translation

=== Dancers ===
- Smitha Madhav - Bharatanatyam
- Prateeksha Kashi - Kuchipudi
- Achuta Manasa – Kathak
- Pali Chandra - Kathak
- Masako Ono – Odissi
- Rashmi Menon – Mohiniyattam

=== Vocals ===
- Padma Vibhushan Hariharan
- Pt. Sanjeev Abhyankar
- Pt. Raghunandan Panshikar, Lalitha Sharma
- Sooraj Santhosh, Saindhavi
- Varijashree Venugopal, Sangeetha

=== Instrumental ===
- Ustad Murad Ali Khan - Sarangi
- Bhuto & BV Balasai - Flute
- BV Raghavendra Rao - Violin
- Allam Durga Prasad - Gottuvadhyam
- Bhavani Prasad - Veena
- B Sivarama Krishna - Sitar
- Sarang - Sarod
- Balesh - Shehnai
- Shrikanth - Hawaii Guitar (Steel guitar)
- DA Srinivas - Mridangam
- Kesavan - Chanda, Idakka & Maddalam
- Venkatesh & B Ganesh Rao - Tabla
- Omkar & Jagadeesh - Pakhavaj
- Chandra Sekhar - Pakhavaj
- Manjunath - Percussion instrument
- DA Srinivas & Kesavan - Jathi
- Manjunath & Jagdeesh - Bhols
