= Achuta Manasa =

Indian Kuchipudi dancer

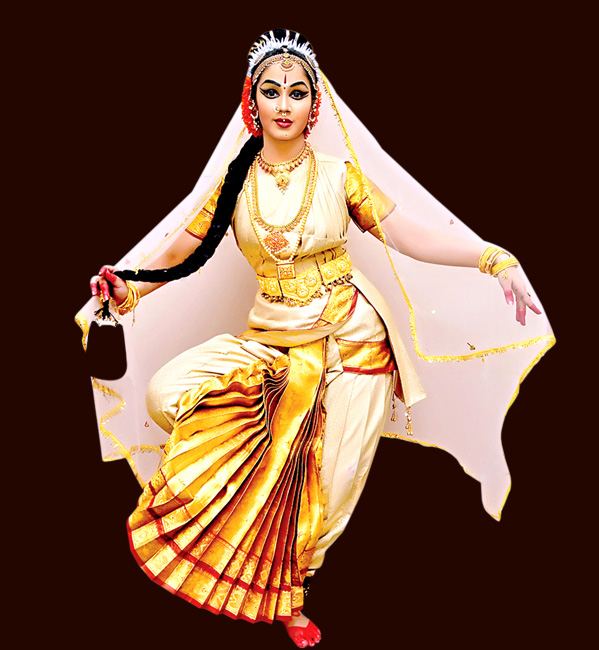
- Achuta Manasa, kuchipudi dancer, Andhra Pradesh
- Born: Andhra Pradesh, India
- Occupation: Kuchipudi dancer
- Website: achutamanasa.in

Achuta Manasa is an Indian Kuchipudi dancer.

== Personal information ==
=== About ===
Manasa was born in Andhra Pradesh. She is the daughter of Rajya Lakshmi and Ravi Chandra.

Her official website was launched by Sri Sri Ravi Shankar.

Manasa is acknowledged as leading young exponent of Kuchipudi – the classical dance form of India that has its cultural roots in ancient history.

Her dance journey began at age six under the guidance of Guru Smt Madhu Nirmala, who had taught some basic steps and later Guru Sri Narasayya. Her debut live performance was at the age of six. She continued her artistic endeavor under the tutelage of renowned gurus by Guru Sri Mahankali Suryanarayana Sarma for three years where a strong foundation has been laid. Later, she has been moulded as a complete Kuchipudi artiste and has been transformed as a gem of Kuchipudi by her Guru "Devaparijatham", "Raja Hamsa", "Natyavisarada" Sri Kaza Venkata Subrahmanyam, who is a disciple of the Gurus Dr. Vempati Chinna Satyam and Sri Chintha Adinarayana Sarma.

With over nineteen years of experience, Manasa has performed over 800 solo kuchipudi recitals at various locations in and across the country and has been honoured with many awards from several organizations, winning accolades and appreciation of audience and critics equally.

A graded artist of Dhoordharshan now, the Indian Ministry of Culture recognized the spark of excellence in the young ten-year-old then and supported her with scholarships to pursue her training for the next decade. Manasa was a 2011 member of the International Dance Council CID – UNESCO and was invited to give a performance representing India for the 31st World Congress on Dance Research in Greece.

=== Education ===
Besides dance, Manasa is an engineer and worked for a software company, but resigned from the job to dedicate her time to Kuchipudi.

=== Performances ===
- Essence of Life at Taj Vivanta, Hyderabad
- Essence of Life at the Chowdiah Memorial Hall, Bangalore
- Performance of Temple Dance, Simhanandini, Kuwait
- 2013 – 11th Ekamra dance festival, Bhubaneswar, Odisha
- 2013 – Hyderabad Heritage Festival, Chowmahalla Palace, Hyderabad, Andhra Pradesh
- Baisakhi Festival, Hyderabad
- Approved as a "Member of International Dance Council CID - UNESCO" for the year 2011 and was invited to give performance representing India for the 31st World Congress on Dance Research at Didimotiho, Greece

=== Awards ===
Manasa has received several awards including:

- Prathibha Puraskar by Acharya Nagarjuna University
- Natyamayuri
- Ugadhi Puraskaram
- Kala Sravanthi
- Sapthagiri Balapraveena
- Natya Kalamai
- Prathibha Pallavam
- NTR Memorial "Telugu Mahila Award"
- international award "UNESCO Millennium Best Cultural Ambassador"
