= Vyjayanthi Kashi =

Indian dancer

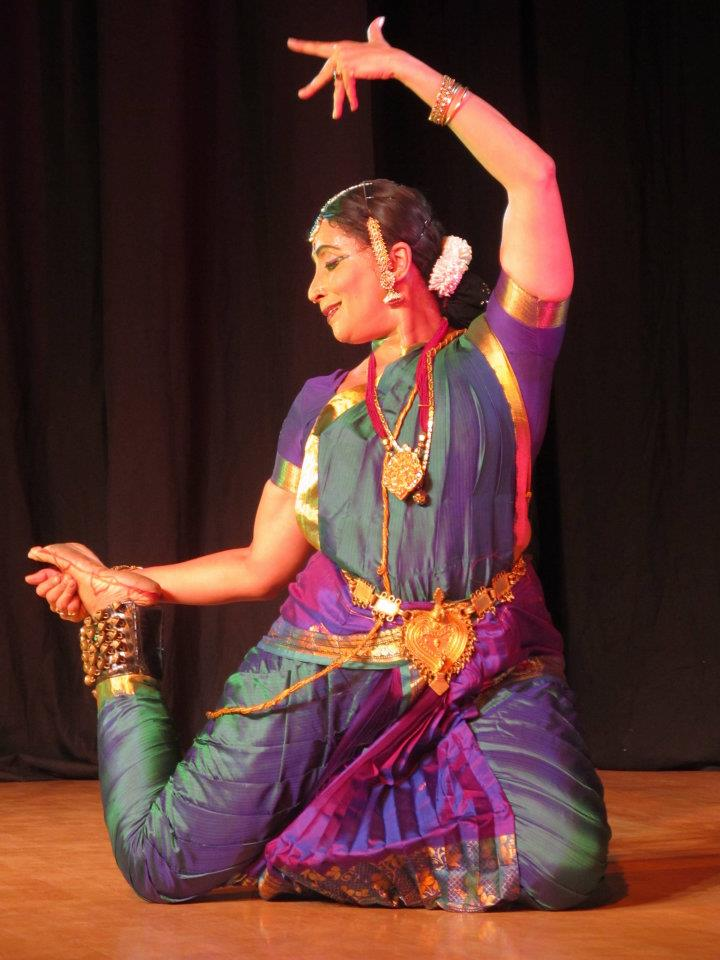
- Vyjayanthi, performing Kuchipudi
- Born: Vaijayanthi Kashi; 1 January 1960 (age 66); Bangalore, Karnataka, India
- Occupations: Dancer, therapist, choreographer
- Known for: Kuchipudi Dancer
- Movement: Kuchipudi Dance
- Spouse: Vijay Kashi
- Children: Prateeksha Kashi (Daughter)
- Relatives: Gubbi Veeranna (grandfather)
- Website: http://www.vyjayanthikashi.com

Vyjayanthi Kashi (born 1 January 1960) is an Indian classical dancer, a kuchipudi exponent. She is from the family of Dr Gubbi Veeranna who was an Indian theatre director, one of the pioneers and most prolific contributors to Kannada theatre. Vyjayanthi Kashi is a reputed kuchipudi dancer, a celebrated performer and choreographer and artistic director of a dance school Shambhavi School of Dance where they teaches this traditional dance form kuchipudi. She was also the chairperson of Karnataka Sangeetha Nritya Academy.

== Personal information ==
Vyjayanthi Kashi is the daughter of the late J.M. Vishwanth and late G.V. Girijamma. Vyjayanthi Kashi started learning Bharatanatya from Ramanna of Tumkur at the age of six. Eventually, she topped the State with a first rank and also won a golden chain. Initially she was not so interested in dance, so eventually she took theatre where she worked with T. S. Nagabharana who is an Indian film director, in the Kannada film industry. She married Vijaya Kashi, a television and theatre artist whom she met while acting in theatre. She took up a job in a bank which later she left as she fully dedicated to dance. She has a daughter Prateeksha Kashi, who is also a kuchipudi dancer.

== Dedication to Kuchipudi ==
Later at a point of time when she felt that this is not what she wants, the same time she met Kuchipudi guru C.R. Acharya who came to the town. In an interview she quoted this became turning pint of her life. She started dancing Kuchipudi again at the age of 30. Having had her training in Indian Classical Dance forms Bharatnatyam, Kuchipudi and Temple Ritual Dances from an early age under legendary Gurus like Late Guru C R Acharya, Late Vedantham Prahalada Sarma, Padmashree Vedantham Satyanarayana Sharma, Bharathakala Prapoorarna, Korada Narasimha Rao and others she has proved a DYNAMIC FORCE in KUCHIPUDI.

Vyjayanthi is celebrated not only for her understanding of the art of Kuchipudi, but also as an actress on television and theatre and her work as a choreographer, dance-educator and dance-therapist.

=== Performances ===
Over her extensive career, Vyjayanthi’s work has been featured in several international festivals, including the International Kuchipudi Convention USA, Milap Fest Uk, Oriental Dance Festival Germany, Festival of India in Africa, India Film Festival in Malaga, Appan Dance Festival in Korea, Olympic Festival in Italy, International Kannada Convention at Los Angeles, International Dance & Music Festival in Egypt, Malta, Tunisia, Karmiel Dance Festival in Israel and many more. She has given lecture-demonstration and conducted workshops in many universities in the US, Italy, Germany, Italy, Dubai, Singapore, Malaysia, Japan, Berlin, Australia, Austria, Spain, Switzerland, and many other countries.

She also gives duet performances with her Kuchipudi Dancer daughter Prateeksha Kashi. This mother and daughter are considered as one of the best pair Kuchipudi Dancers from India worldwide.

- Lecture Demonstration on "Contribution of Woman to Kuchipudi" at Nayika-Excellence Personified, Bangalore
- Performance with group of Shambhavi School of Dance at ‘Lok-folk’ festival, Eluru, Andhrapradesh
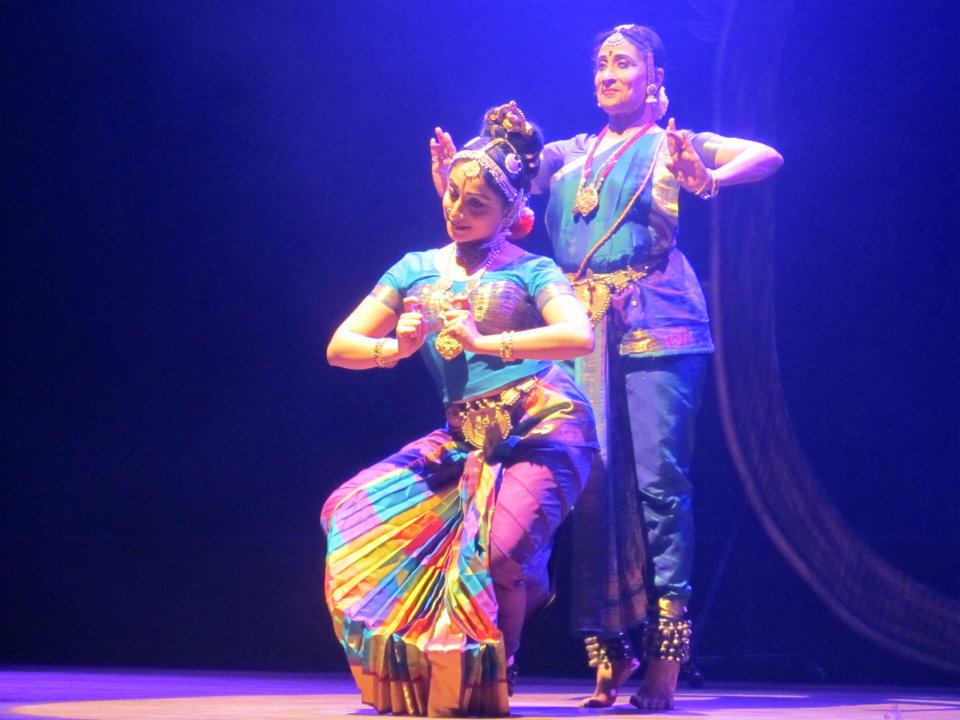
Kashi with her daughter Prateeksha Kashi performing "PARAMPARA"

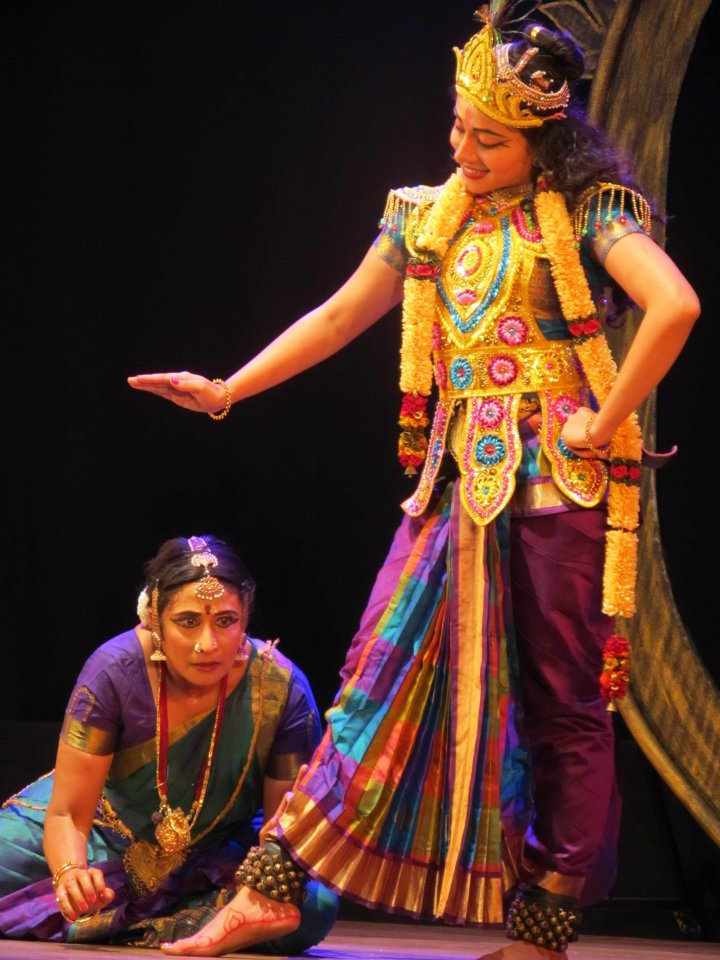
Kashi as "Kubje" and Prateeksha Kashi as "Krishna"

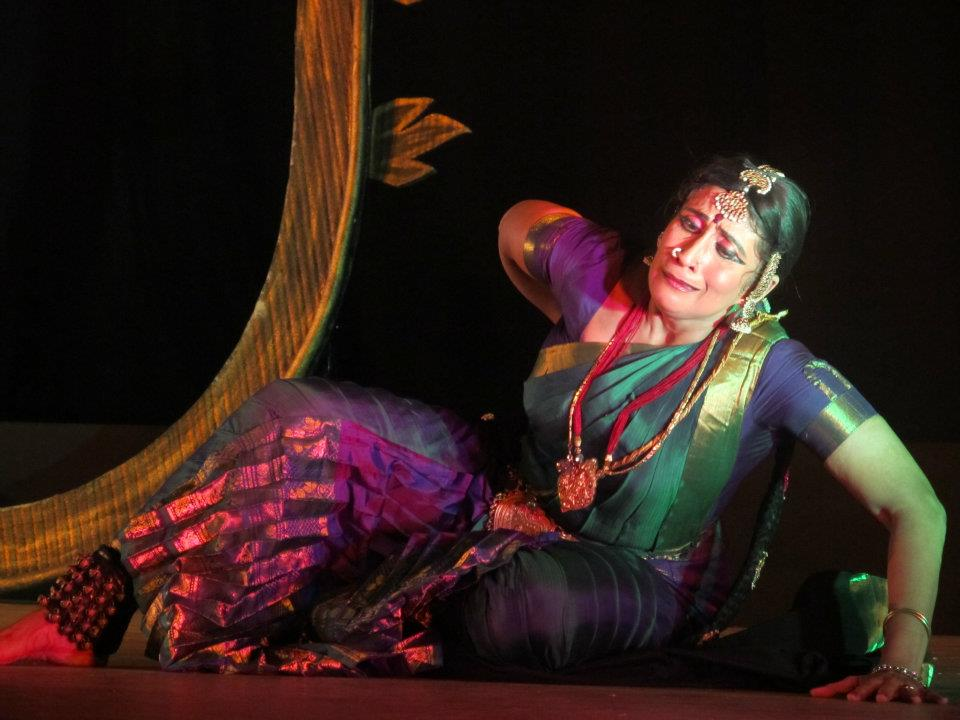
Kashi playing the role of "Kubje" who is a devotee of Lord Krishna

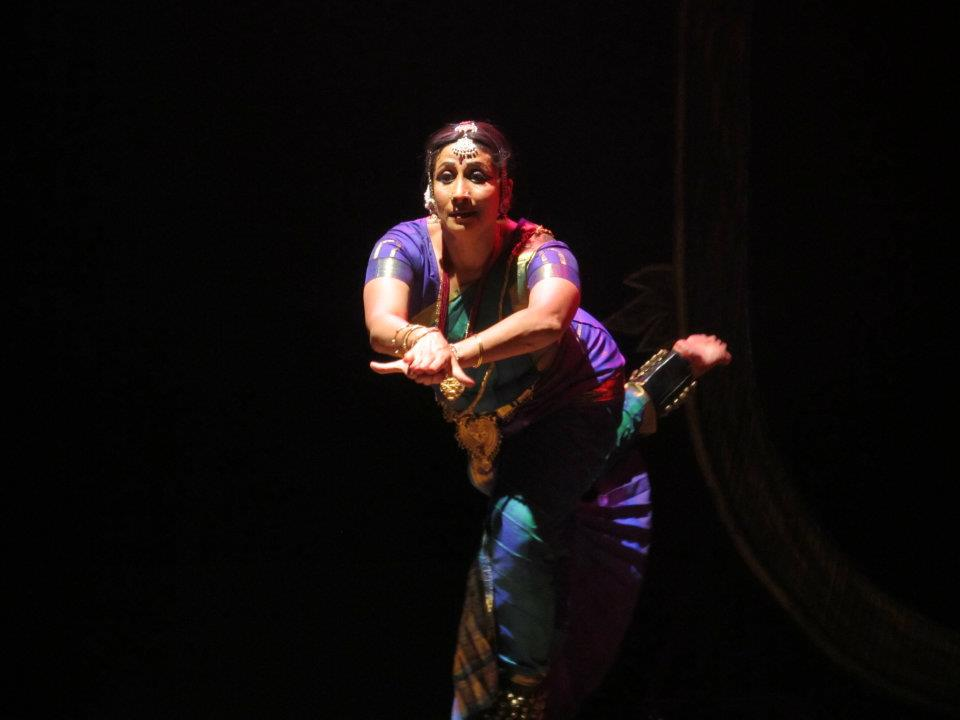
Kashi- Versatile Kuchipudi Dancer

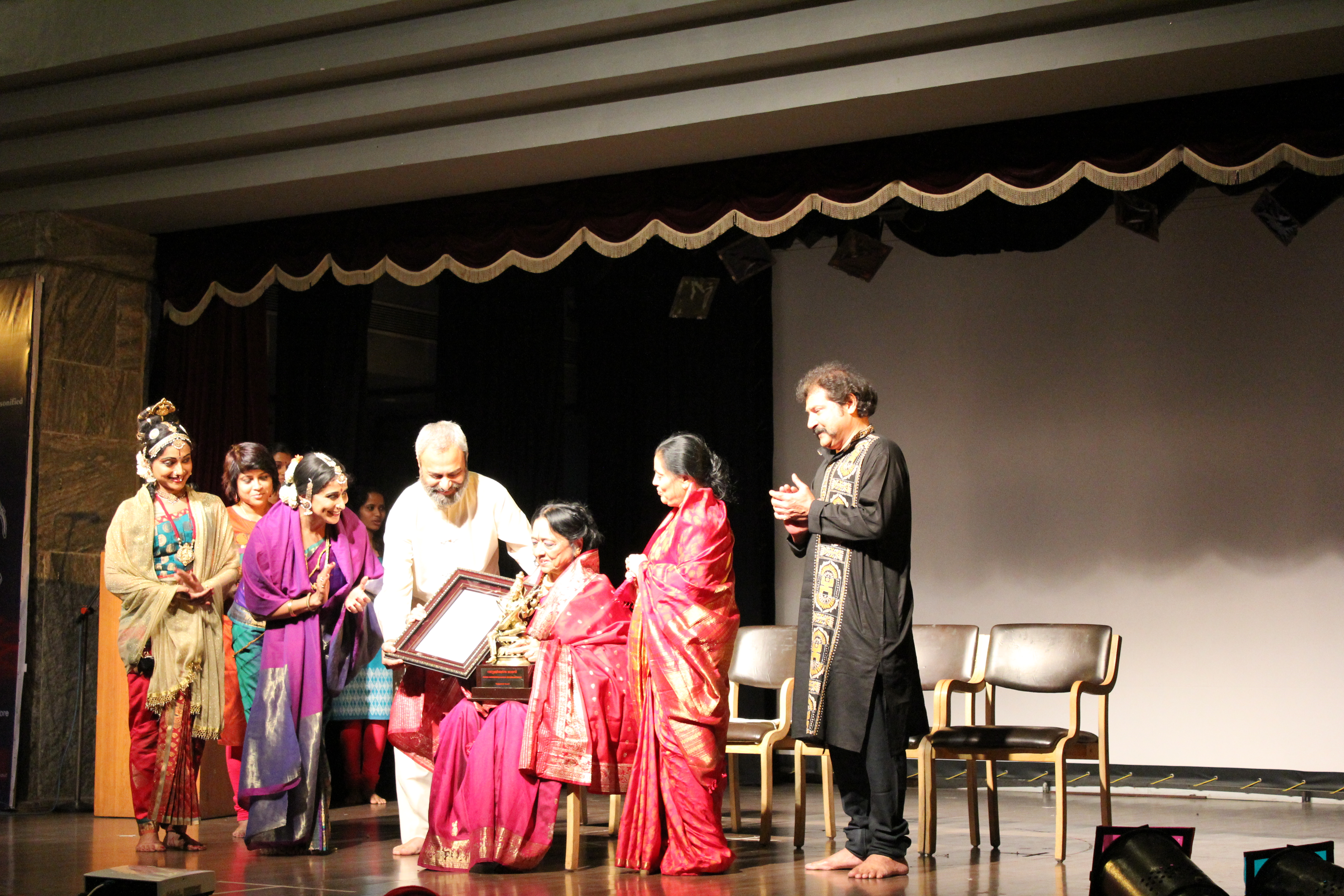
Vyjayanthi Kashi conferring Natya Shastra Award to Padmabhushan Dr. Yamini Krishnamurthy at Nayika

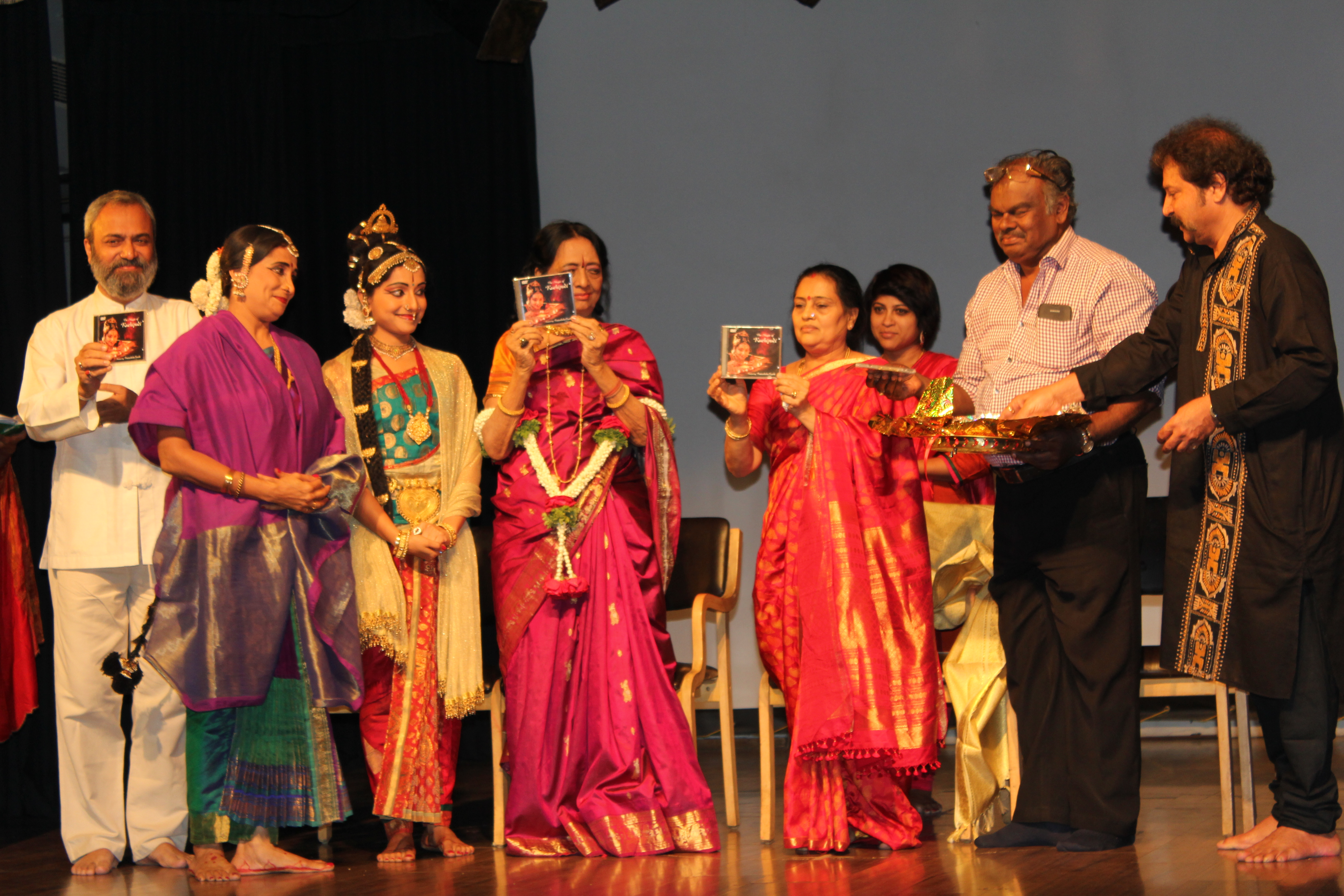
Kashi at the launch of her daughter, a Kuchipudi Dancer Prateeksha Kashi's dance DVD "The Magic of Kuchipudi" at Nayika

=== Key achievements & awards ===
Unfettered by anything but DANCE, today Vyjayanthi Kashi is an iconoclast in the field of dance. She is a dance-bridge between the pristine classical style of Kuchipudi and more contemporary aesthetic. She serves on the Arts and Cultural committee of the Ministry of Tourism and culture, Govt of India. Over her extensive career, Vyjayanthi’s work has been featured in several international festivals.

To mention a few of her credentials

- Present Member of Central Sangeet Natak Akademi
- Former Chairperson of Karnataka Sangeeta Nrutya Academy
- Recipient of the Central Sangeet Natak Akademy Puraskar
- Recipient of the Karnataka Rajyothsava Award
- Recipient of Vocational Excellence Award from Rotary International
- Recipient of the Zee Astitva Award
- Top Ranking Artist of Doordarshan the broadcasting media
- Research fellow of Govt. of India in Kuchipudi
- Member of the text book committee of kuchipudi (state govt)
- She is the founder and artistic director Shambhavi School of Dance
- dancejathre India's first ever International dance fair is her brain child

== Film, theatre and television ==
Vyjayanthi Kashi is a frequent presenter at international dance conferences and symposia. Her film and television credits include documentaries and interviews on Doordarshan, Sony Television, Zee T V, E-Nadu, Udaya, and Chandana. She is an acclaimed TV actress, being featured in some of the regional TV serials such as Mukta Mukta, Manvantara, Male Billu and more. Presently she is acting in a Kannada serial Nannarasi Radhe in Colors Kannada.
