= World Theatre Day =

International observance on 27 March

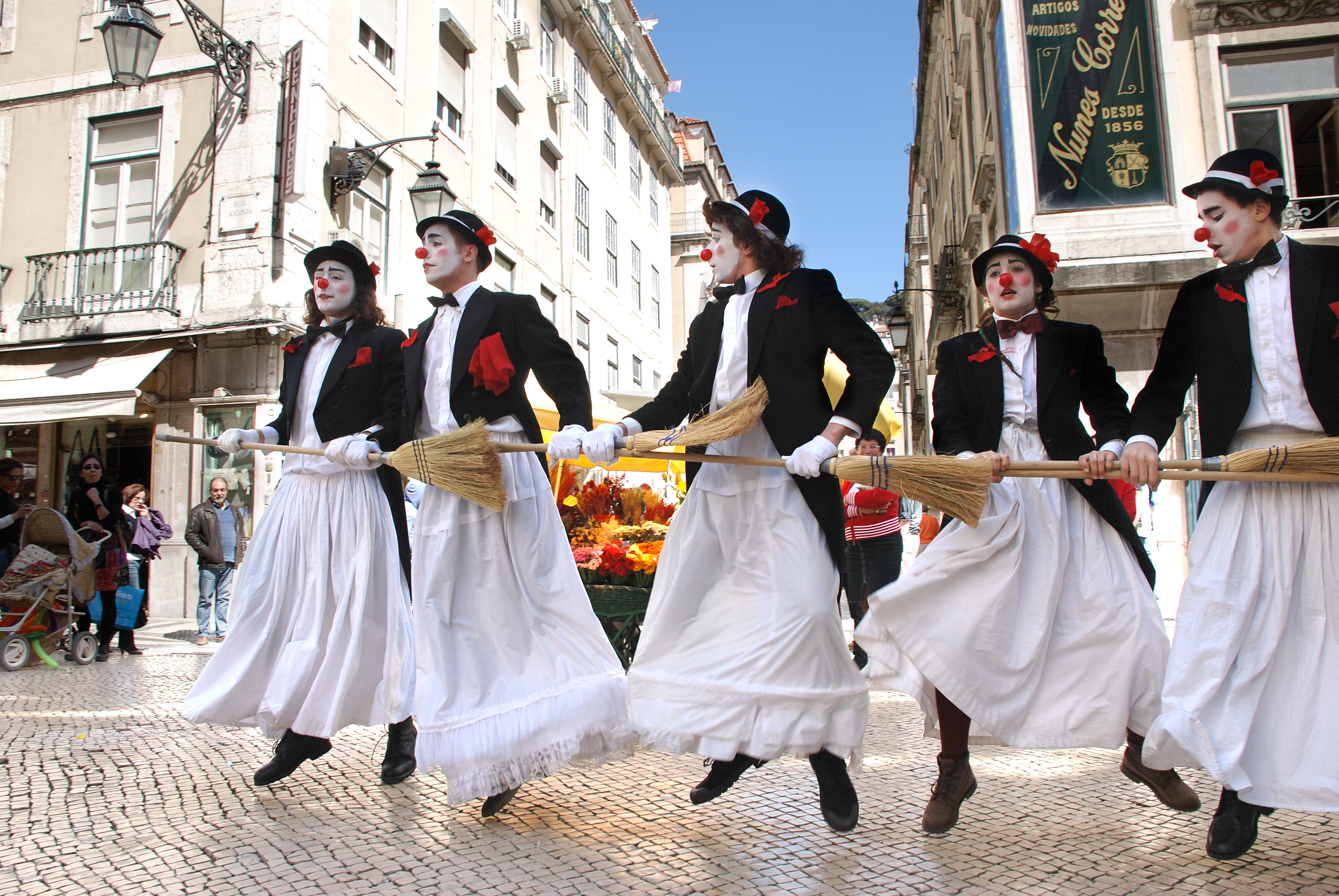
- Performance for World Theatre Day 2010
- Type: International
- Date: 27 March
- Next time: 27 March 2027
- Frequency: Annually

World Theatre Day (WTD) is an international observance celebrated on 27 March. It was initiated in 1961 by the International Theatre Institute.

== History ==
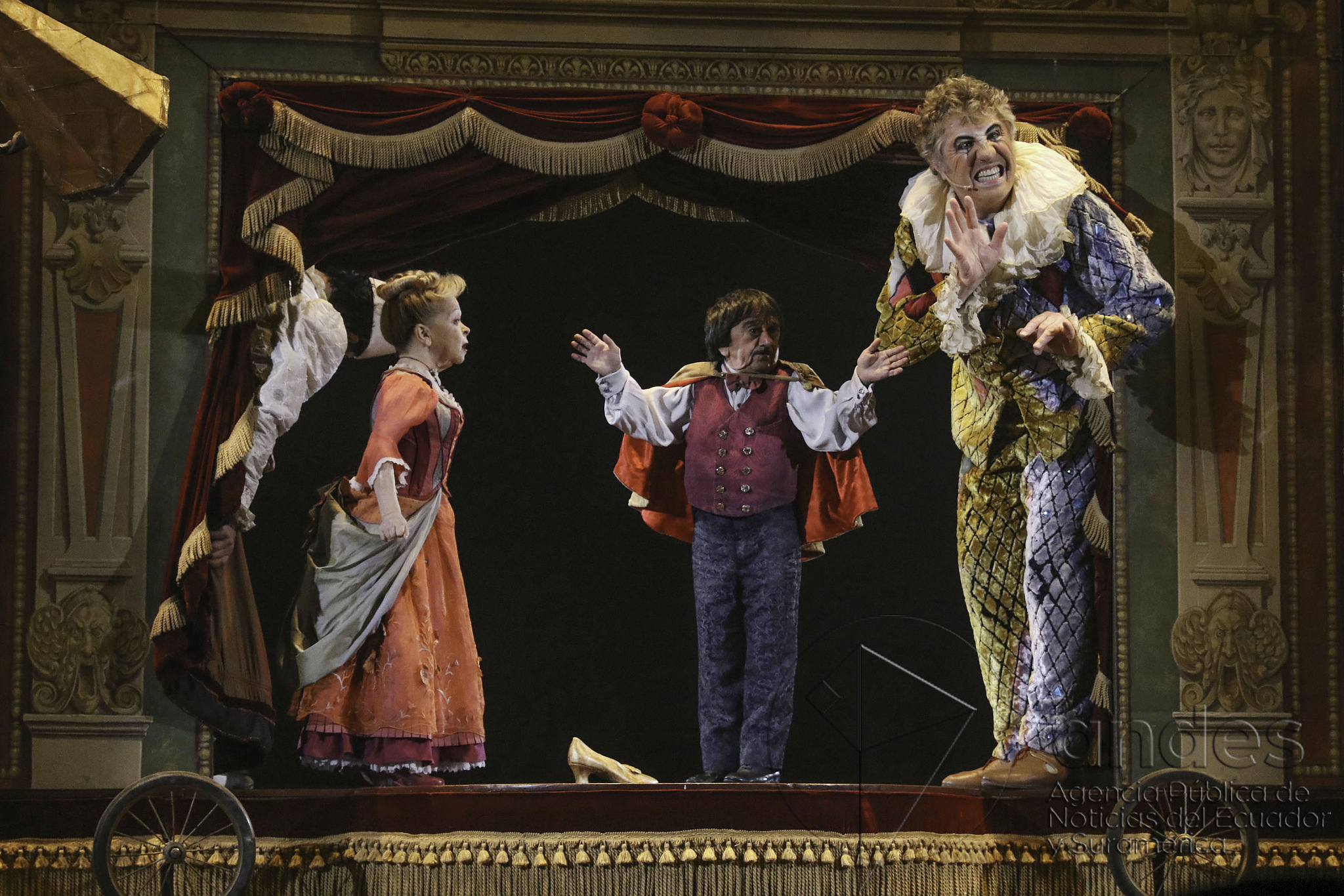
World Theatre Day

World Theatre Day was initiated in 1962 by the International Theatre Institute (ITI). It is celebrated annually on 27 March by ITI Centres and the international theatre community. Various national and international theatre events are organized to mark this occasion. One of the most important of these is the circulation of the World Theatre Day International Message through which at the invitation of ITI, a figure of world stature shares his or her reflections on the theme of Theatre and a Culture of Peace. The first World Theatre Day International Message was written by Jean Cocteau (France) in 1962. It was first in Helsinki, and then in Vienna at the 9th World Congress of the ITI in June 1961 that President Arvi Kivimaa proposed on behalf of the Finnish Centre of the International Theatre Institute that a World Theatre Day be instituted. The proposal, backed by the Scandinavian centres, was carried with acclamation.

The 2023 International Message was entrusted to Samiha Ayoub, an Egyptian actress mainly in theater, but also active in the world of cinema and television.

For the 62nd edition of World Theatre Day in 2024, the message, entitled 'Art is Peace', was written by Jon Fosse, Norwegian writer and playwright. It strongly and profoundly recalls the founding values of theatre with respect to the global community, emphasizing the peaceful and universal value of art.

The 2026 International Message was entrusted to American actor Willem Dafoe with the conclusion: "In a world that seems to get more divisive, controlling and violent, our challenge as theatre makers is to avoid the corruption of theatre solely as a commercial enterprise dedicated to the entertainment by distraction or as the dry institutional preserver of traditions, but rather to foster its strength to connect peoples, communities, cultures and above all to question where we are going."
