= Smitha Madhav =

- Origin: Hyderabad, Andhra Pradesh, India
- Genres: Carnatic music – Indian Classical Music and Classical Dance
- Occupations: Carnatic musician, Dancer
- Website: Official website

Smitha Madhav is a Carnatic Classical Singer and Bharatanatyam Dancer. Carnatic music is a system of music commonly associated with the southern part of India and one of the two main classifications of Indian Classical Music (the other being Hindustani Classical Music).

== Music career ==
Smitha has been trained in Bharatanatyam by Guru Nritya Choodamani Smt Rajeswari Sainath, the director of Sruthi Laya Kendra Natarajaalaya. This institute was founded by Mrudangam maestro Karaikudi Mani. She also continues to receive advanced training in Carnatic Classical music from Ms Lalitha & Ms Haripriya, better known as Hyderabad Sisters. Smitha has a Diploma program in Music and Dance from the Telugu University which she completed with distinction. She is currently pursuing the Masters' Program in Dance from the Indirakala Sangeet Vishwa Vidyalaya and the Masters' programme in Music from the Madras University. She is an empanelled artiste of the Indian Council for Cultural Relations (ICCR)

=== Tours and performances ===
Smitha has performed in all major sabhas all over India and has presented her concerts in the United States of America, Australia, Vietnam, Indonesia, Singapore and Malaysia. She rendered nearly 30 recitals and lecture demonstrations across the United States to render funds for Vegesna Foundation, a non-profit organisation dedicated to serving disabled children.

=== Choreographies ===
Smitha also choreographs on her own, including:

- Raagam Raaghavam: A solo thematic Bharatanatyam presentation based on various renditions of the Ramayana
- Navasandhi: A dance tribute to the Dikpalas
- Sri Venkata Gireesham Bhaje: A multi-lingual solo choreographic work that traces the pilgrims progress from Tirupati to Tirumala.
- Kesadi Paadam: A work using pure dance, instrumentation and Aahaarya to tell various hitherto unheard stories from the life of Lord Krishna.

=== Film and television ===
- Smitha played the lead role of Seetha in the feature film Bala Ramayanam (1996) produced by M.S. Reddy and directed by Gunasekhar. Unique in that its entire cast comprised children between 10 and 12 years of age, the film went on to win the National award.
- More recently, Smitha played the female lead in Prithvi, a bi-lingual (Bengali and Telugu) art film directed by Sisir Sahana.

On television, Smitha has anchored several shows in multiple languages.

- She has hosted several episodes of the Gemini TV show Jayam Manade.
- She has hosted a year-long season of Annamayya Sankeerthanarchana, a Carnatic music show on Sri Venkateswara Bhakthi Channel (TTD) along with scholar and musicologist, Sri Pappu Venogopala Rao.
- In Tamil, Smitha coordinated and presented Vijay TV's Sangeetha Sangamam, a successful program that showcased promising and upcoming Carnatic musicians
- Smitha also featured in Krishna Vijayam on Vijay TV where she presented a series of classical numbers coinciding with the Deepavali celebrations on the Tamil channel.
- She performed at the Bhakti Tiruvizha held at Narada gana sabha, Chennai that was telecast on Vijay TV. * Her rendering in dance format of all 30 pasurams of the Aandaal Tiruppavai has been featured in the Bhakti Channel, Hyderabad.

=== List of select concerts ===
- Essence of Life, Hyderabad
- Thyagaraja Aradhana Festival, Tirupati
- Krishna Gana Sabha, Chennai
- Nada Brahma Gana Sabha, Chennai
- Krishna Gana Sabha, Chennai
- Narada Gana Sabha, Chennai
- TTD Brahmotsavam, Tirupati
- Saraswati Gana Sabha, Kakinada
- Shanmukananda Sabha, Mumbai
- Ramakrishna Math, Singapore
- Tyagaraja Aradhana, Thiruvaiyaru
- Brahma Gana Sabha, Chennai
- Thyaga Brahma Gana Sabha, Chennai
- Waldorf International Conference, Hyderabad
- MAA TV Ravindra Bharati, Hyderabad
- Mylapore Fine Arts, Chennai
- Bharat Kalachar, Chennai
- Kartik Fine Arts, Chennai
- Music Academy, Chennai
- Shanmukhananda Sabha, Delhi
- Bangalore Gayana Samaja, Bangalore
- Guruvayur Devaswom, Guruvayur
- Telugu Association of North America
- Yuva Sangeetotosavan, Dept. of Culture, Govt of Andhra Pradesh

== Recent events ==
- Smitha Madhav gave a dance performance in November 2011 for the Singapore Management University's e-MBA pioneer class. The theme of this performance was Leadership and Management principles through Bharatnatyam. This performance did not showcase just the traditional art form, but explained certain key concepts that can be applied to present day management and leadership from ancient Indian Texts like the Ramayana and Mahabharata. She was responsible for the end to end orchestration of the program including conceptualisation, scripting, choreography, background music score and narration for the event. The performance was well received by the foreign audience.
- Smitha was honoured with the Akkineni Nageswara Rao SWARNA KANKANAM award in September 2011. On this occasion, she presented a unique twin recital, where she rendered a classical song while simultaneously dancing to a pre-recorded orchestra. The recital was conceived as a tribute to T Balasaraswathi and M.S. Subbalakshmi. The songs chosen were 2 of their ever green songs. Krishna Ni Begane Baaro from Balamma's repertoire and a Meera Bhajan, More tho giridhar Gopal, popularised by M. S. Subbulakshmi
- Smitha gave two performances at the World Tamil Economic Conference held in Dubai from 1 October 2011 to 4 October 2011. One was a bharatanatyam performance and a second was a vocal recital of Tamil Songs.
