= International Theatre Institute =

Performing arts organisation

The International Theatre Institute ITI UNESCO Institut International du Théâtre ITI UNESCO (in French)
- Abbreviation: ITI
- Formation: 1948; 78 years ago, Prague
- Type: Specialised agency
- Legal status: Active
- Headquarters: Paris, France
- Official language: English, French,
- Head: CHEN Zhongwen; Director-General of ITI
- Website: www.iti-worldwide.org

The International Theatre Institute ITI is the world’s largest performing arts organisation, founded in 1948 by theatre and dance experts and UNESCO.

It has hosted various events through its history, including the Theatre of Nations, an international festival of performers from around the world staged in different countries, from 1956 until at least the 1980s; and it continues to organise International Dance Day and World Theatre Day every year at the UNESCO, Paris.

== Goals ==
Dedicated to performing arts, ITI advances UNESCO’s goals of mutual understanding and peace and advocates for the protection and promotion of cultural expressions, regardless of age, gender, creed or ethnicity. It works to these ends internationally and nationally in the areas of arts education, international exchange and collaboration, and youth training.

To achieve its mission, the International Theatre Institute:

- encourages activities and creation in the field of the live performing arts (drama, dance, music theatre);
- aims to expand existing collaborations between performing arts disciplines and organisations, both national and international;
- establishes international offices and fosters the establishment of ITI Centers in all countries;
- collects documents, disseminates all types of information and issues publications in the realm of the performing arts;
- cooperates actively in the development of the "Theatre of Nation]" and encourages and coordinates the organisation of theatrical congresses, workshops and meetings of experts, as well as festivals, exhibitions and competitions, both on regional and interregional levels, in cooperation with its members;
- defends the free development of the performing arts and contributes to the protection of the rights of performing arts professionals

== Organisation ==
ITI is a network in which approximately 92 Centres evolve. A Centre is composed of professionals active in the theatre life of the country and representative of all branches of the performing arts. Its activities are conducted both on a national and international level.

ITI also set up various Committees (or Forums and Groups) in order to focus on specialised areas of the performing arts, such as The Communication Committee (ComCom) dedicated to the study of the role of media communication in promoting theatre, The International Monodrama Forum (IMF)or The International Dance Committee (IDC).

== Events ==
=== Theatre of Nations ===
The ITI collaborated with various other parties to establish the Theatre of Nations festival, with the first one being held Paris in 1957. Ten nations were represented at the inaugural event, which was based first at the Sarah Bernhardt Theatre and later at the Odeon Theatre until 1972. The event showcased international performances, including diverse forms such as Peking Opera and Kabuki, and theatre troupes like the Berliner Ensemble and the Moscow Art Theatre, seen for the first time in the west after World War II.

In 1975 the format was changed, and cities were invited to apply to host the festival. The first one held outside of Paris was held in Warsaw in that year, and then continued to be held in various other cities around the world. Mounted annually in the 1970s, the event took place biennially in a different country every two years from 1982. In its 20th edition, in June 1986 the festival took place in the United States for the first time, in the city of Baltimore.

As of 2021 the last Theatre of Nations was organised by the China Theatre Association and held in Nanjing in 2008.

=== Other events ===
ITI organises International Dance Day (held in Cuba for the first time in 2018) and World Theatre Day.
