= Dega Deva Kumar Reddy =

Indian educationist and film producer

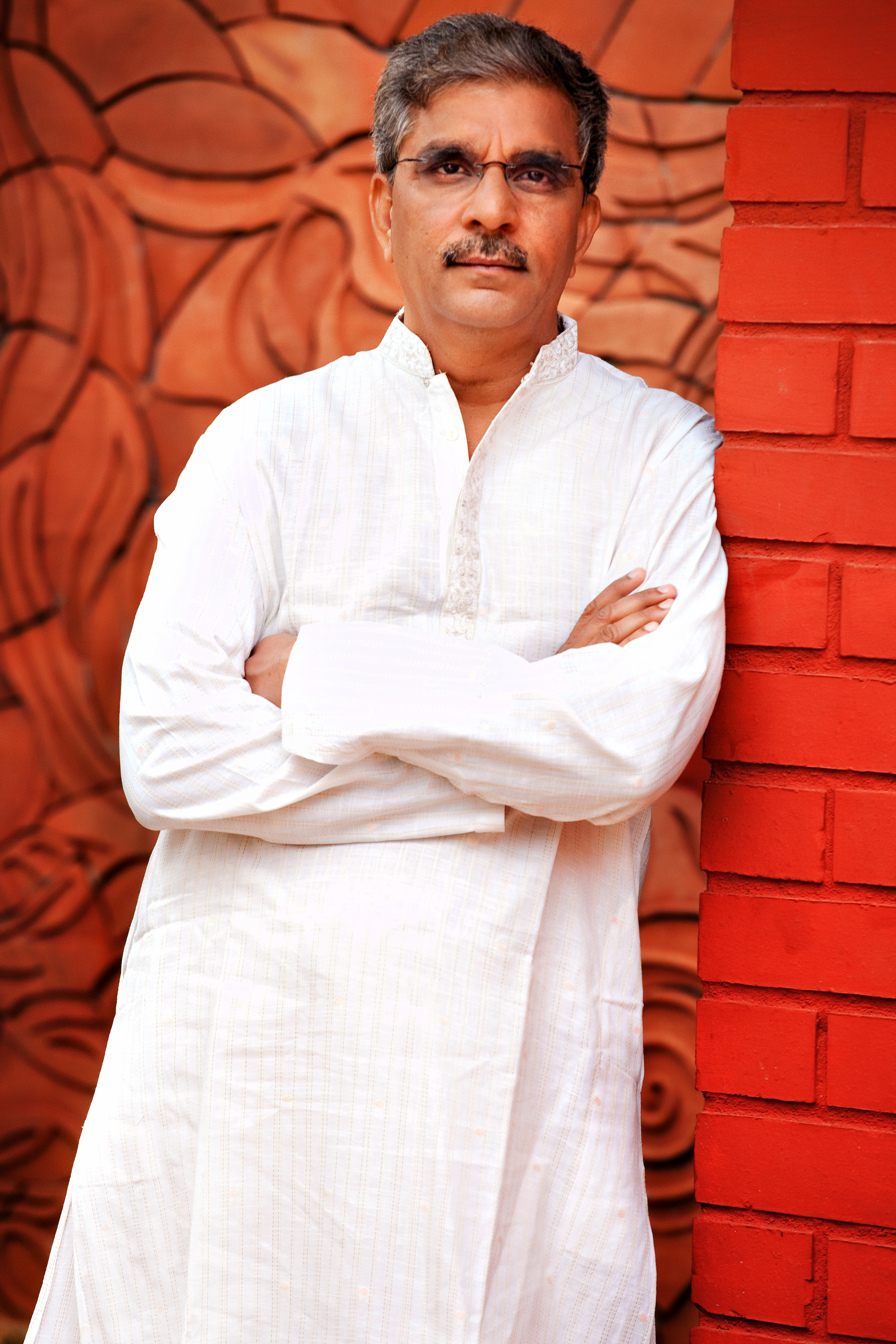
- Born: 1958 (age 67–68); India
- Education: Rishi Valley School, Loyola College, Chennai & Madras School of Social Work
- Occupations: Educationist, Indian film producer and Entrepreneur
- Known for: The Pathless Land - Jiddu Krishnamurti International Centre, Essence of Life

Dega Deva Kumar Reddy is an Indian educationist, film producer, and an entrepreneur. Deva Kumar is an alumnus of Rishi Valley School, a school founded by Jiddu Krishnamurti in Madanapalle, South India. He founded 'Srujana School' and produced Telugu feature films Ammayi Bagundi and Manasu Palike Mouna Raagam. He also produced 'Essence of Life' a synergy of five Indian classical dance forms based on Jiddu Krishnamurti teachings.

== Influence ==
Inspired by Jiddu Krishnamurti's teachings, Dega Deva Kumar Reddy popularized Krishnamurti teachings through education, art form, and films.

== Career ==
=== Innovations in Education ===
Deva Kumar graduated from Loyola College, Chennai, and obtained master's degree from Madras School of Social Work. Deva Kumar founded an alternative school based on Jiddu Krishnamurti's teachings along with social reformer, author and educationist Manchireddy Sivaram and English educationist and author Eleanor Watts for under privileged children at Pinakini Satygraha Ashramam in Pallipadu village, Nellore District of Andhra Pradesh. The innovative work done at Srujana School was documented in the books - A School Under Trees and A Journey With Children - Exploration in Self and Alternative Education. Elenor Watts had later written several books based on her work and association with 'Srujana School'. Sivaram had documented his experiences and thoughts on Education in the book 'Sramajeevana Vidya Viplava Kavyam'.

=== Film career ===
Deva Kumar has produced two Telugu feature films based on Jiddu Krishnamurti's philosophy under Dega Arts banner. Ammayi Bagundi was released in 2004 starring Sivaji (Telugu actor), Meera Jasmine and Manasu Palike Mouna Raagam with Sneha (actress) in the lead role in 2006.Ammayi Bagundi was dubbed in Malayalam as Manjupeyyum Munpe and Manasu Palike Mouna Raagam was dubbed to Tamil.

=== Essence of Life (dance group)|Essence of Life ===
Dega Deva Kumar Reddy conceptualized and produced 'Essence of Life', a dance form inspired by Jiddu Krishnamurti's teachings. Essence of Life was a synergy of five classical Indian dance forms – Bharatanatyam, Kuchipudi, Kathak, Mohiniyattam and Odissi. Essence of Life was performed in several states in India and received rare accolades.

=== The Pathless Land ===
'The Pathless Land' is a Jiddu Krishnamurti International Centre and School in Madikeri, Kodagu district, Karnataka, India, promoted by Dega Deva Kumar Reddy. 'The Pathless Land' is modeled after Brockwood Park School, a school founded by Jiddu Krishnamurti in UK in 1969.

=== Entrepreneur ===
Deva Kumar Reddy is founder of Future Organics, a company that produces organic products. He is also the promoter of 'Dega Farms and Eco Constructions' a Jiddu Krishnamurti retreat centre in Hosur near Bangalore.
