= Pali Chandra =

Indian choreographer, dance educator and artistic director (born 1967)

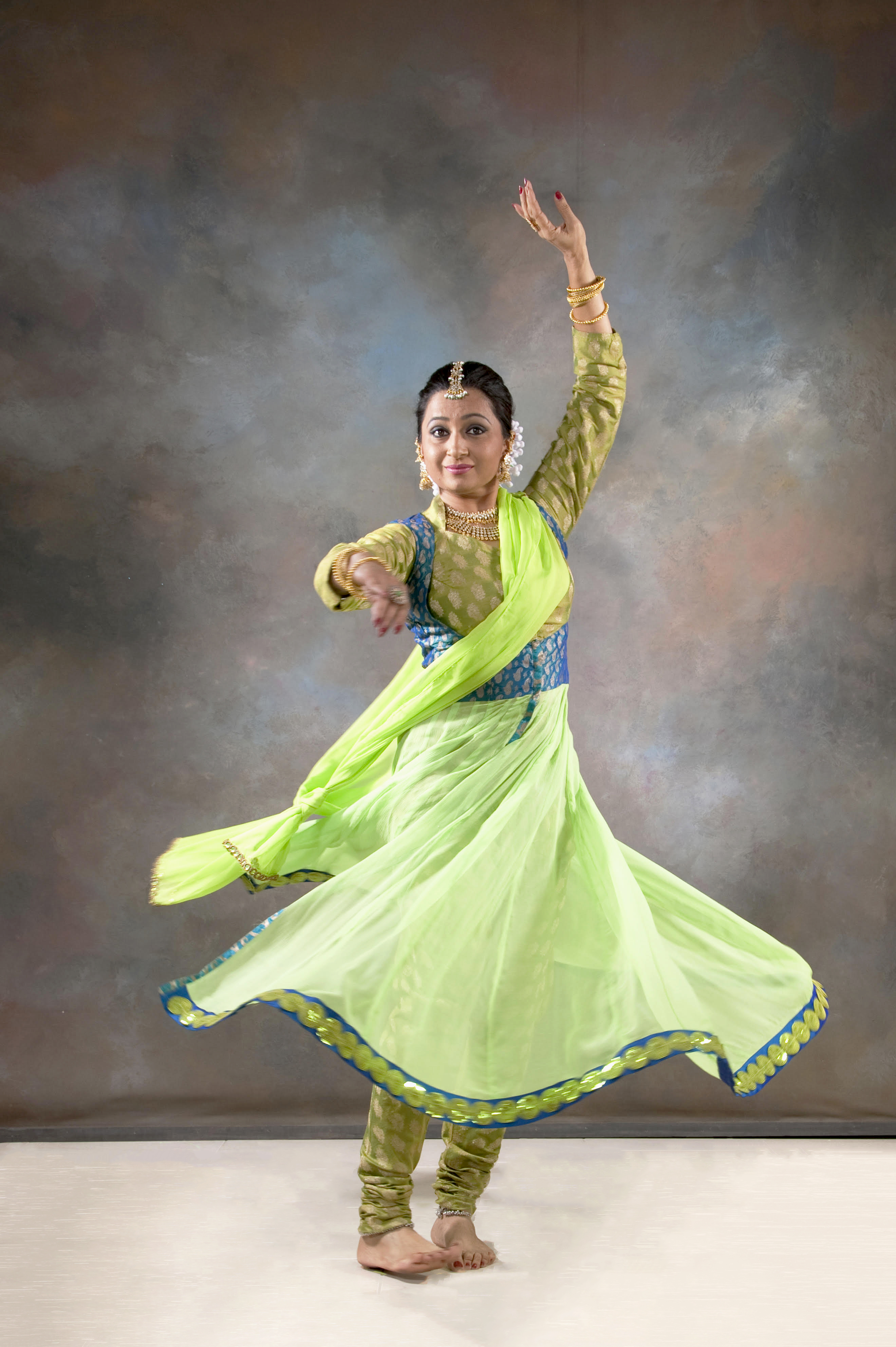
Pali Chandra - Kathak Lucknow Gharana

Pali Chandra, (born 19 November 1967) is an Indian choreographer, dance educator and artistic director who propagates dance education through various channels. She has established several studios specialising in Kathak training programs in the United Kingdom, United Arab Emirates, India and Switzerland. She has directed 14 art festivals in various continents and is the co-founder for the portal Learn Kathak Online as well as Course Director of Kathak for Natyasutra Online with Invis Multimedia.

Pali is a committee member of the Imperial Society of Teachers of Dancing, and a graded member of the Indian Council for Cultural Relations.

== Early life and education ==
Chandra was born and raised in Lucknow, the capital of Uttar Pradesh to Dwarka Nath Srivastava, a retired senior officer of Reserve Bank Of India and NABARD who was based in Lucknow for most of his life; and Usha Srivasatava, a Hindustani classical music singer from Faizabad. She is the sister of Somna Tugnait. Chandra started dancing at the age of six. She trained under her guru Vikram Singhe, Sangeet Natak Akademi, and Kapila Raj, as well as Ram Mohan Mishra for 13 years at Kathak Kendra Lucknow.

She graduated from Lucknow University in 1991 with a Master's degree in anthropology for her research on the tribal music and dance of the Gaddis. She also graduated from Avadh Girls' Degree College with a Bachelor's degree in arts, economics, and anthropology. She also went to Loreto Convent.

== Career ==
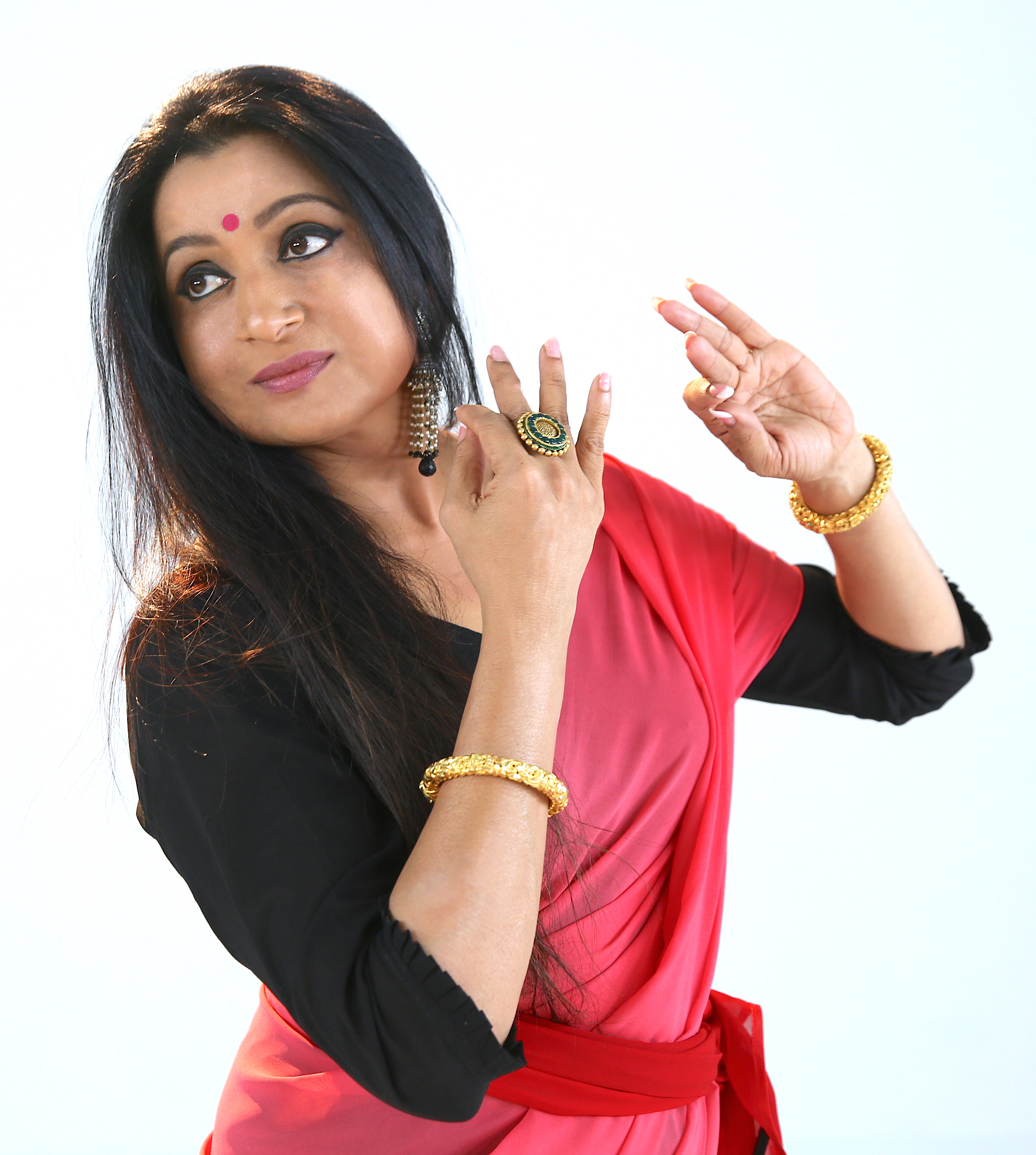
Pali Chandra as a digital dance educator

Chandra is a senior member of the British Imperial Society of Teachers of Dancing and a graded member of the Indian Council for Cultural Relations. She has designed and executed workshops for institutes such as Oxford University, Birmingham University and Bradford University.

The first of four gurukul studios was founded in 2008 in Dubai, where Pali Chandra provides instruction to 550 students learning and performing Kathak whilst following the ISTD - UK (Imperial Society for Teachers of Dancing - United Kingdom) syllabus. In 2019, she founded the Swiss International Kathak Festival (of which she is the artistic director), organized 11 annual dance festivals called Dancing Divas from 2009 to 2019, and released several productions in the UK, UAE and India.

Under the banner of Pali Peacocks, Chandra has been honored at the House of Commons in London as the Best Art Director for her production In the Shadow of the Hills. Her projects have frequently received funding from the Arts Council of England and London Arts Board and other institutions and organizations.

=== Activism ===
Pali Chandra was involved in awareness programs for people with special needs.

== Productions and choreography ==
Title	Location	Year
Continental Shift	London	1994
Ganges to Thames	London	1996
In the Shadow of the Hills	London	1999
Kamoshi ki Avaaz	London	2001
She	United Kingdom	2002
Gazal in Retrospect	London	2003
Rhythm Shift	London	2004
Five Elements	Dubai	2010
Sufi Noor	Dubai	2012
Across	Dubai	
Essence of Life	India	2013
Naach - Hundred years of Bollywood	Dubai	2014
Zinda	Dubai	
Navinayika	Dubai	2015
Taal Mala	Dubai	2016
Noor ki Baarish	Dubai	2016
Soney ki Chidya	Lebanon	2017
Aamad	Bangalore	2017
Aamad	Nehru Centre, London	2018
Lasya	Dubai	2018
Kahani	Dubai	2019
Play with a Cause - Parkinson	Dubai	2019
Thaat	Bangalore	2019
Tihai	Bangalore	2020
Shyam Piya	Zurich	2019
Repertoire	London	2018
Repertoire	Aargau	2019
Dance to Empower	Switzerland	TBA

== Awards ==
Title	Issued by	Country	Year
Kathak Ambassador	Asian Community Arts & Katha UK	House of Lords London Parliament, England	2018
Best Art Director " Production 'In The Shadow Of The Hills’	Millennium Dome, London	House of Commons, London England	2000
Cultural Ambassador	The Indian Consulate, UAE	Dubai	2016
Successful Art Business Award	ICS Women's Forum	Dubai	2014
International Woman of the Excellence Award	Dhwani	Abu Dhabi	2013
Gold Medalist Prayag Sangeet Samiti	Prayag Sangeet Samiti	India	1990
Lacchu Maharaja Award for Abhinaya	Kadambari Kala Parishad	India	1991

== Personal life ==
Pali is married to Vishal Chandra and has twin sons. They live together in Schinznach Bad in Aargau, Switzerland.
