= Ammayi Bagundi =

- Theatrical release poster
- Directed by: Balasekaran
- Written by: V Vamsi (dialogues)
- Screenplay by: Balasekaran
- Based on: Parthiban Kanavu (Tamil)
- Produced by: Dega Deva Kumar Reddy
- Starring: Sivaji; Meera Jasmine
- Edited by: K.Ramesh
- Music by: M. M. Srilekha
- Production company: Dega Arts
- Release date: 16 July 2004
- Country: India
- Language: Telugu
- Box office: ₹5 crore distributors' share

Ammayi Bagundi (transl. The girl is good) is a 2004 Indian Telugu-language film directed by Balasekaran, starring Sivaji and Meera Jasmine (in her Telugu debut). The music was scored by Srilekha and produced by Dega Deva Kumar Reddy. It is a remake of the Tamil film Parthiban Kanavu (2003) and was successful at the box office. It was eventually dubbed into Malayalam as Manjupeyyum Munpe.

== Plot ==
Shiva is a marketing executive. His parents want him to get married but he does not believe in an arranged marriage and waits for a girl he likes. One day, Shiva sees a girl and is immediately attracted to her. He follows her and finds her office location. He sees her every day while she is on the way to her office. Also, Shiva learns that her tastes and interests match his and starts to love her.

Meanwhile, Shiva's parents decide to get him married to a well-reputed contractor's daughter and force him to meet her. He goes to meet the girl without any interest. However, to his surprise, the girl, Sathya, is the one he admires. Shiva feels happy.

Shiva and Sathya get married. On the way back to their home, Shiva finds the girl in the same place where he has seen her before daily. He is surprised when he realises that Sathya is the lookalike of the girl whom he loved. Shiva visits the girl's office and enquires about her. He learns that the other girl's name is Janani and she has come for a project temporarily. Also, Shiva starts maintaining distance from his wife as he finds her interests are different from his. He is more responsible and she understands that her husband is confused and tolerates his behaviour. Shiva's friend, Dada Giri, advises him to accept Sathya as his wife and to forget Janani. Slowly, Shiva starts understanding his wife. But to everyone's surprise, Janani comes to stay in a flat opposite Shiva's. Sathya meets Janani and is surprised to see her look alike.

Everyone from Sathya's family comes to meet Janani and is surprised. Janani is fun-loving. Shiva does not disclose that he knew Janani before and starts befriending her. Dada Giri understands that Shiva is slowly moving away from his wife and is getting attracted to Janani. So, he plans to reveal everything to Janani, so that she will leave the place. Dada Giri meets Sathya and misunderstands her as Janani (as Sathya always wears sarees while Janani is in modern attire). Without knowing that it is Sathya, he reveals all the truth about Shiva's secret love towards Janani and requests her to vacate the place, so that Shiva can lead a happy life with Sathya. He is surprised to learn that it was Sathya and not Janani.

Sathya cries and leaves for her parents' home. When Shiva goes to her house, she defends her husband before her parents. Janani wants Shiva to meet in a temple. He asks about his love for her, but Shiva replies that he loved her before and when he realised his wife's love towards him, he changed his mind. He also says that he will wait until Sathya changes her mind and returns to live with him. But now, it is Sathya disguised as Janani and the meeting plan was set by Janani. Sathya feels happy hearing her husband praising her. Shiva and Sathya live happily while Janani vacates her flat wishing them good luck.

== Cast ==
- Sivaji as Shiva
- Meera Jasmine in dual role as Janani and Sathya
- Ali as Dada Giri, Shiva's friend
- Bhavana as Dada Giri's wife
- Brahmanandam as Sales Executive Manager
- Siva Krishna as Shiva's father
- Chitram Srinu
- Sudha as Shiva's mother
- Rajan P. Dev as Sathya's father
- Shanoor Sana as Satya's mother
- M. S. Narayana as Shiva's uncle
- Duvvasi Mohan as Shop-keeper
- Surya as Janani's father
- Hema as Janani's mother
- Telangana Shakuntala in a cameo appearance

== Soundtrack ==
Ammayi Bagundi

Soundtrack album by M. M. Srilekha
- Released: 3 June 2004
- Recorded: 2003–2004
- Genre: Feature film soundtrack
- Length: 28:59
- Label: Aditya Music
- Producer: M. M. Srilekha

M. M. Srilekha chronology
Neetho Vastha (2003)	Ammayi Bagundi (2004)	Adirindayya Chandram (2005)

The film's soundtrack, marketed by Aditya Music, was released on 3 June 2004 by M.M. Srilekha. The song "Kanaa Kandaenadi" from the original Tamil film was retained here as "Kale Kannanule".

Track List
No.	Title	Singer(s)	Length
1.	"Aey Sathya"	Karthik, Sabita Reddy, Shivaji	4:48
2.	"Harilo Ranga Hari"	Sukhwinder Singh	4:35
3.	"Krishna Krishna"	Udit Narayan, K. S. Chithra	4:40
4.	"Ammai Bagundi"	S. P. B. Charan	4:31
5.	"Patala Pallakilo"	K. S. Chithra, Shivaji	5:30
6.	"Kale Kannanule"	Madhu Balakrishnan	4:55
Total length:			28:59
