= Masako Ono =

Japanese Odissi dancer

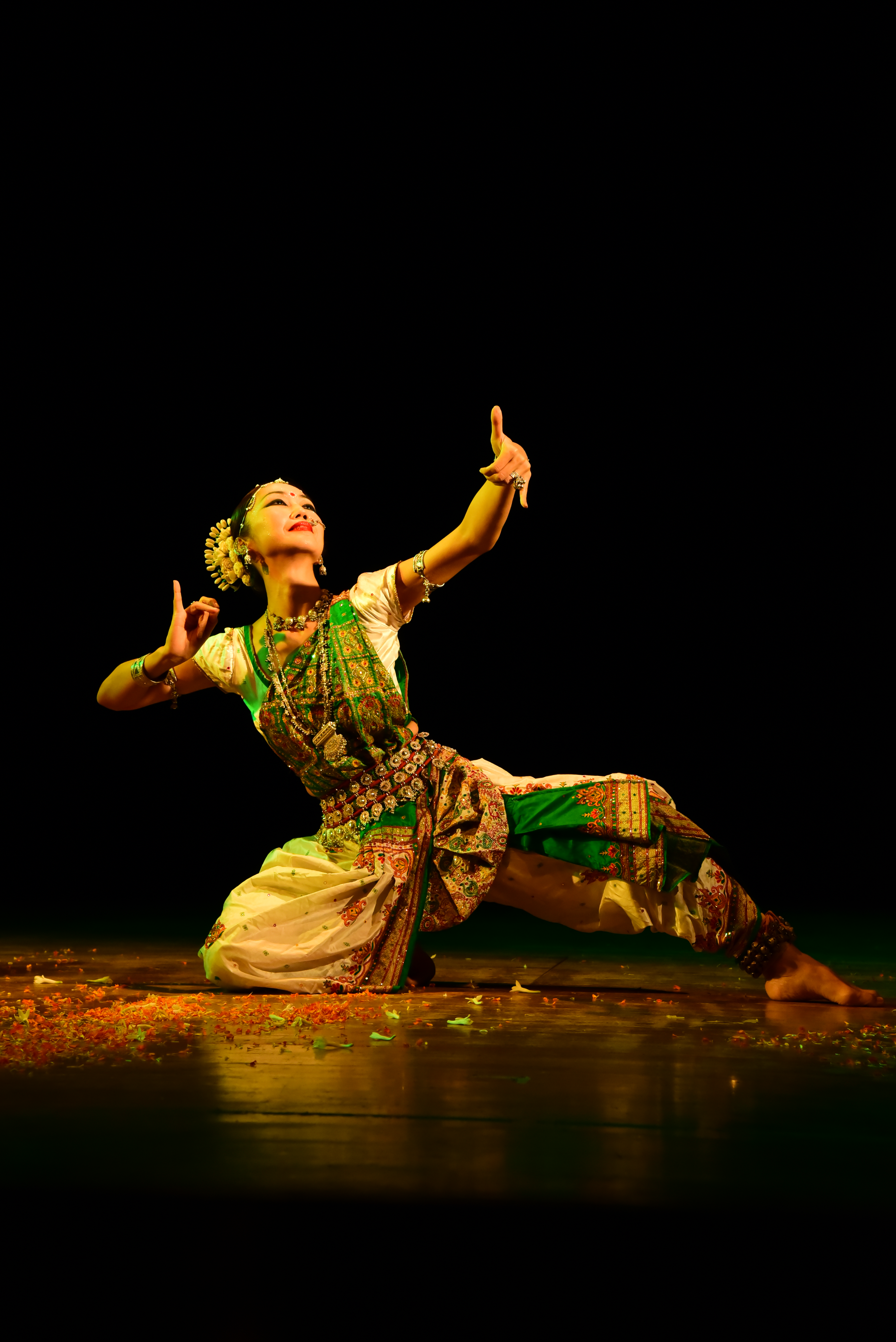
- Born: Tokyo, Japan
- Occupation: Dancer
- Years active: 1996–present
- Career
- Dances: Odissi, Contemporary
- Website: masakoono.com/en

Masako Ono (小野 雅子, Ono Masako) is a Japanese Odissi dancer. She has lived in India since 1996.

Ono was named one of the 100 most respected and outstanding Japanese in the world in their respective fields by the Japanese issue of Newsweek in 2008 and was featured in a documentary series, First Japanese.

== Biography ==
Ono also trains other Odissi dancers and directs Masako Ono Performing Arts (MOPA) in India and Japan. In 2010, she launched the MUDRA Foundation to support the efforts of international artists working to promote local art and handicrafts.

== Works ==
Pieces choreographed by Masako Ono include Frozen Grace, Dance of the Crane, Divinity Within - Tantrik Prayer, Kundalini Stavah, and The Day Dream.

== Professional milestones ==
- Called one of the world's 100 most respected Japanese people in their respective fields by Newsweek Japan in 2008.
- NHK BS 1 produced a piece on Masako Ono as part of the First Japanese series in 2007.
- Performed for Junichiro Koizumi and Shinzo Abe, former Prime Ministers of Japan.
- Performed at the Kennedy Center in Washington D.C., USA in 2007.
