= Pinakini Satygraha Ashramam =

Pinakini Satyagraha Aasramam is also called Gandhi Aasramam, it was started by Mahatma Gandhi in 1921 in Pallipadu Village, Indukurupeta mandal, Nellore district, Andhra Pradesh state, India.
