= Yamini Krishnamurthy =

Indian dancer (1940–2024)

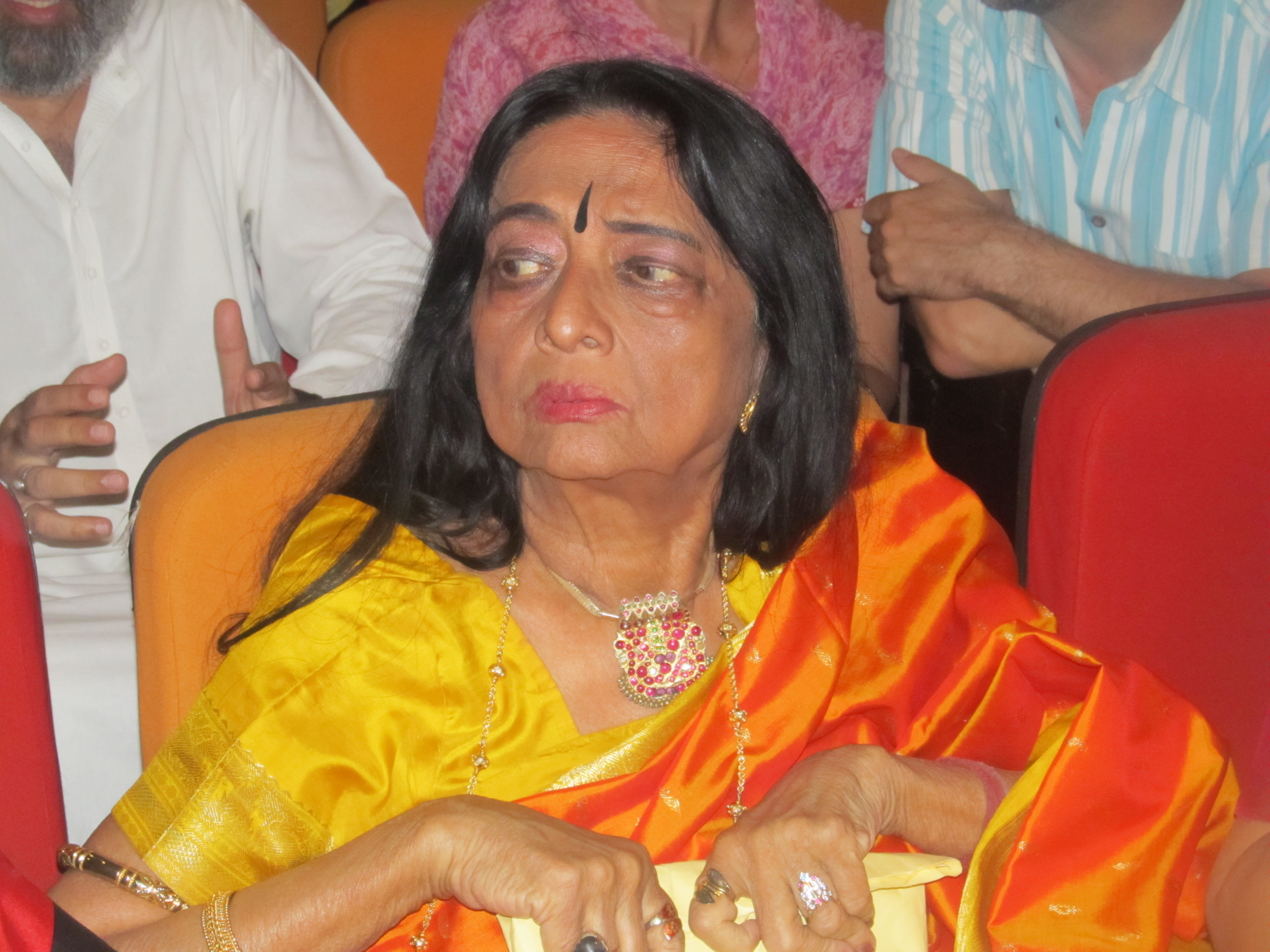
- Krishnamurthy in 2014
- Born: 20 December 1940; Madanapalli, Madras Province, British India
- Died: 3 August 2024 (aged 83); New Delhi, India
- Known for: Indian Classical Dance
- Movement: Bharatnatyam, Kuchipudi
- Awards: Padma Shri (1968), Padma Bhushan (2001), Padma Vibhushan (2016) and Sangeet Natak Akademi Award (1977)

Mungara Yamini Krishnamurthy (20 December 1940 – 3 August 2024) was an Indian classical dancer recognized for her contributions to Bharatanatyam and Kuchipudi. She was a recipient of the Padma Shri (1968), Padma Bhushan (2001), Padma Vibhushan (2016) and Sangeet Natak Akademi Award (1977).

== Early life ==
Krishnamurthy was born on 20 December 1940 in Madanapalli, in the present-day Chittoor district, of the Indian state of Andhra Pradesh. Her father, M. Krishnamurthy, was a Sanskrit scholar. She began her dance training at the age of five at the Kalakshetra School of Dance in Madras (now Chennai), under the guidance of Bharatanatyam danseuse Rukmini Devi Arundale. After mastering the basic skills, she went on to study under renowned dancers such as Kanchipuram Ellappa Pillai and Thanjavur Kittappa Pillai.

Krishnamurthy would, in later interviews credit her growing up in Tamil Nadu and the local cultural environment, including the Thillai Nataraja Temple in Chidambaram as inspirations for her art.

== Career ==
Krishnamurthy started her dance career with a Bharatanatyam performance in Madras in 1957. Her Gurus during this period included Kanchipuram Ellappa Pillai, Kittappa Pillai, Dhandayuthapani Pillai, and Mylapore Gowri Ammal. Though she started with Bharatnatyam, Krishnamurthy expanded her skills to include Kuchipudi and Odissi dance forms. She is noted to have popularized these dance forms in North India in the 1960s when she relocated to Delhi. After one of her performances in the national capital, the visiting Canadian prime minister Pierre Trudeau is noted to have gone to the stage, held her hands and remarked, "Keep dancing. Don't stop. Just keep dancing". Her performances also took her to other countries, including the US, the UK, the Soviet Union, Thailand, Iran and Pakistan.

In recognition of her contributions, she was appointed as the Asthana Nartaki (transl. resident dancer) of the Tirumala Tirupati Devasthanam. She set up her dance training institute, Yamini School of Dance, in Hauz Khas in New Delhi.

Krishnamurthy was a recipient of the Padma Shri (1968), Padma Bhushan (2001), and Padma Vibhushan (2016) and the Sangeet Natak Akademi Award (1977). She also received the Natya Shastra award from the Shambhavi School of Dance in 2014.

Krishnamurthy published her autobiography, A Passion for Dance, in 1995.

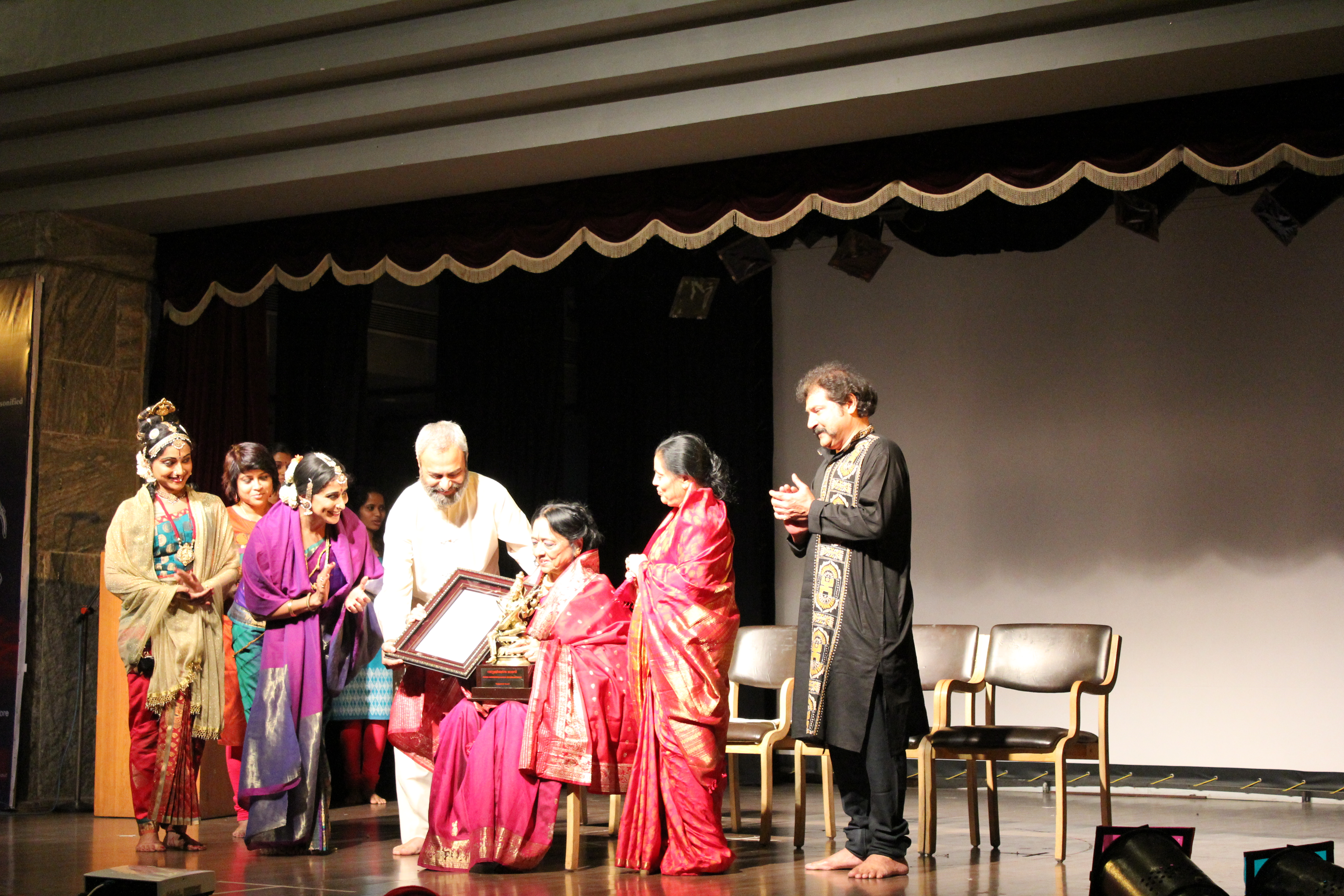
Krishnamurthy receiving the Natya Shastra Award by Shambhavi School of Dance in Bangalore (March 2014)

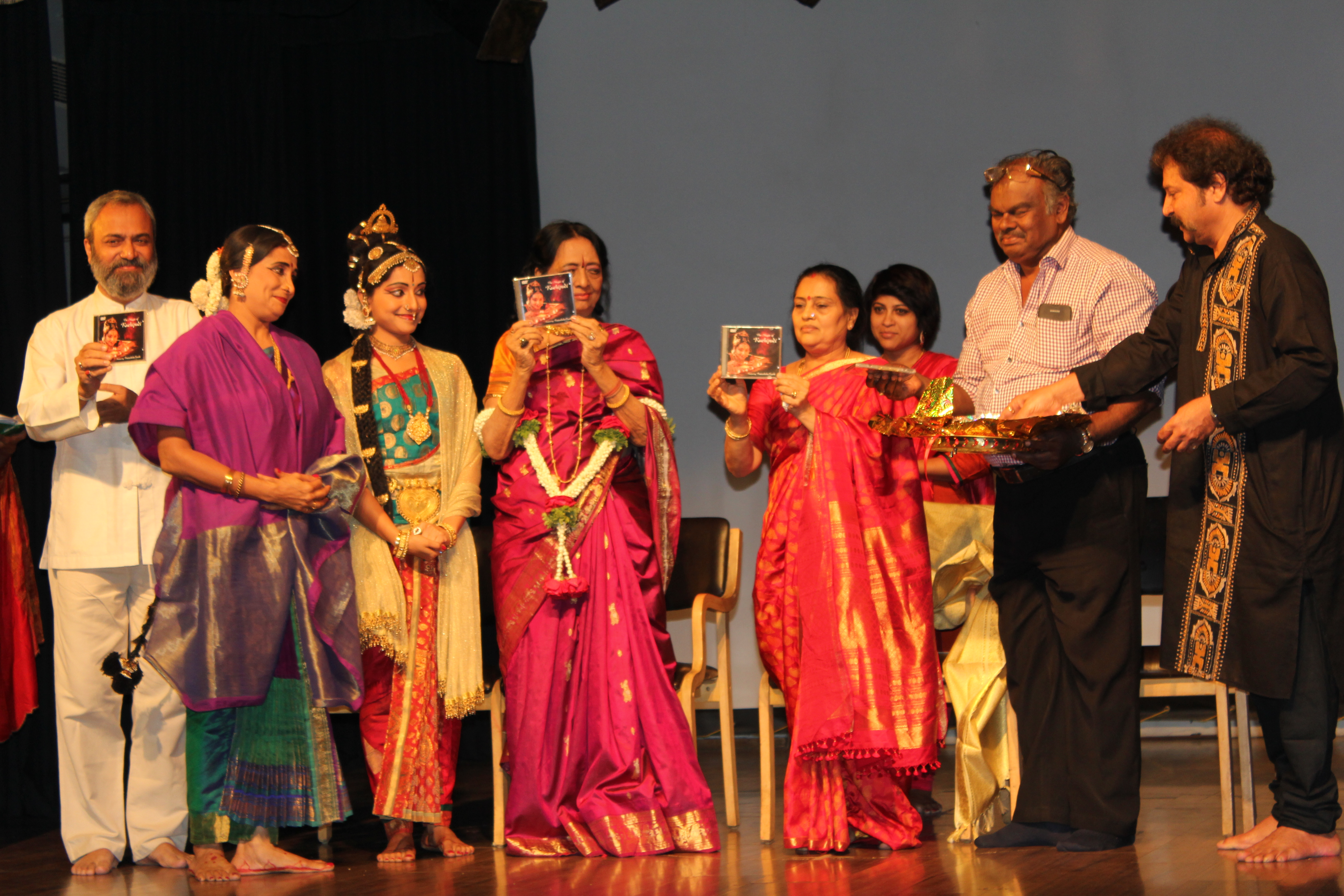
Krishnamurthy at the launch of The Magic of Kuchipudi DVD (March 2014)

== Death ==
Krishnamurthy died on 3 August 2024 in New Delhi, at the age of 83.
