= International Dance Council =

Organization

International Dance Council (CID, in French: Conseil international de la danse) is the umbrella organization for all forms of dance in the world. It was founded in 1973 at the headquarters of UNESCO in Paris "under the auspices of UNESCO as a forum for the exchange of ideas and developments in dance".

As a consultative body of UNESCO, the CID advises UNESCO, governments, and various national and international institutions in the field of dance.

Considered one of the most important international institutions for the development of dance worldwide, the CID is known as "the United Nations of Dance." It is recognized by the UNESCO system, by governments of various countries and regions, and by international organizations.

Every year, the CID organizes International Dance Day, which has been celebrated since its foundation.

== Organization ==
CID was established in 1973 as UNESCO's consultative body in the field of dance. It is based at the UNESCO headquarters in Paris.

Known as "the United Nations of Dance," the CID is the official organization for all forms of dance from every country in the world. It is recognized by UNESCO and by national and local governments as the highest authority representing the art of dance.

CID is also accredited under UNESCO’s Conventions, such as the "Convention for the Safeguarding of the Intangible Cultural Heritage" and the "Convention on the Protection and Promotion of the Diversity of Cultural Expressions."

CID’s regional structures and members extend to more than 170 countries, encompassing federations, associations, schools, cultural and artistic institutions, as well as professionals in the fields of dance, culture, and education.

CID comprises over 2,000 institutional members and more than 10,000 individual members, including many renowned dancers, choreographers, dance instructors, and specialists from various fields worldwide.

Dedicated to the preservation and promotion of the art of dance on a global scale, the CID serves as the official body for the support and management of the diverse forms of dance around the world. It is recognized and supported by the United Nations system, as well as by the governments of many countries and other international organizations.

== History of the CID ==
Under the auspices of UNESCO as a forum for the exchange of ideas and developments in dance, International Dance Council was founded in 1973 at the UNESCO headquarters.

The renowned German dancer Kurt Jooss was elected as its first president. Subsequently, statutory assemblies were held in Stockholm (1975 and 1982), in Cologne (1977), in London (1980), in Paris (1984), and in Istanbul (2007). Other past presidents are Janine Alexandre-Debray (France), Bengt Häger (Sweden), Milorad Mišković (Serbia) and Mario Bois (France). The current president is Alkis Raftis, re-elected at the 21st general assembly in Paris (2021).

In 1975, UNESCO’s General Assembly officially recognized the International Dance Council.

== International Dance Day ==
Since 1982, every April 29, thousands of dancers around the world have celebrated International Dance Day (also known as World Dance Day). This global initiative, supported by UNESCO, sees the CID playing a major role as the initiator and primary supporter, in collaboration with other important institutions in the dance sector. This day was established in tribute to Jean-Georges Noverre, who is considered the creator of modern ballet.

Each year, on International Dance Day, the CID publishes an official annual message—translated into several languages and disseminated in various ways across more than 170 countries and regions, reaching over 150,000 dance professionals.

In addition, the CID organizes official celebrations at the UNESCO headquarters as well as in partner cities around the world, including special performances, dance parties, forums, seminars, exhibitions, master classes, and lectures.

In 2020, the Director-General of UNESCO, Ms. Audrey Azoulay, delivered a special message for International Dance Day, highlighting the essential role that dance plays in the cultural and social sphere of humanity.

In 2016 and in 2017, the United Nations Postal Administration (UNPA) commemorated International Dance Day—which falls on 29 April—by issuing special stamp series. The first series, released on 2016, consisted of mini-sheets of six stamps. Due to its popularity, UNPA issued a second set on 23 March 2017.

In 2017, in collaboration with the World Food Programme (WFP), the CID launched the "Dance for Zero Hunger" project. This project aims to promote food security, raise children’s awareness of the importance of healthy eating, provide vocational training opportunities, and disseminate the Zero Hunger message through dance, while providing food aid to 80 million people worldwide.

== International Cooperation ==
The International Dance Council and its global network actively participate in various international collaborations and projects, such as:

- The World Dance Congress in Mumbai, India (2016)
- The international ballet competition organized in collaboration with the Russian Ministry of Culture (2017)
- The first international seminar on intangible dance ("Dance and Spirituality") in the Bahamas, supported by the Bahamian Prime Minister (2019)
- The international conference on Mongolian shamanic dance, organized in collaboration with the Mongolian University of Arts and Culture (2021)

The International Dance Council has developed over several years and plays a role in the global dance sector, contributing to dance initiatives and innovation of dance art.

== Programs ==
- International Dance Day
- The Global Dance Directory
- The international certification in dance studies
- The World Congress on Dance Research
