= International Dance Day =

Annual day to celebrate dance, established by UNESCO

International Dance & Song Day
- Observed by: All UN Member States
- Date: April 29
- Next time: 29 April 2027
- Frequency: Annual

International Dance Day is a global celebration of dance promoted by the International Dance Council (CID) and the International Theatre Institute.

The event takes place every year on 29 April, which is the anniversary of the birth of Jean-Georges Noverre (1727–1810), who is considered to be the "father" or creator of modern ballet (i.e. classical or romantic ballet as we know it today not "Modern Ballet" as this is sometimes confused with contemporary ballet.) The day strives to encourage participation and education in dance through events and festivals held on the date all over the world.

== Purpose of Dance Day ==
The core objective of International Dance Day is to raise public awareness of dance as an art form, a means of cultural expression, and an educational tool. It particularly encourages governments and educational institutions worldwide to integrate dance into the education system, ensuring its accessibility from primary to higher education.

Through this celebration, the CID aims not only to promote the artistic beauty of dance but also to make it an accessible way of life for everyone, regardless of age, gender, or cultural background.

Despite being an essential part of human culture, dance often lacks official recognition worldwide. In his 2003 International Dance Day message, CID President Prof. Alkis Raftis stated: “In nearly 200 countries globally, more than half have no legal references to dance, whether positive or negative. Government budgets allocate no funds to support this art form. Both private and public institutions neglect dance education.”

== Messages from UNESCO’s Director-General ==
In 2026, Canadian choreographer Crystal Pite delivered a message on International Dance Day, and in 2025, Latvian and American dancer Mikhail Baryshnikov delivered a message on International Dance Day.

In 2020, UNESCO Director-General Audrey Azoulay delivered a speech on International Dance Day, emphasizing the importance of dance to humanity.

In 2003, the then-Director-General of UNESCO, Koïchiro Matsuura, also addressed International Dance Day and, on this occasion, appointed the renowned Cuban dancer Alicia Alonso as a UNESCO Goodwill Ambassador.

The Director of UNESCO’s Museums and Creativity Section, Christian Manhart, delivered a special address for International Dance Day in 2014.

Each year, CID announces an official message for Dance Day, which is translated into multiple languages and shared globally across 170 countries and regions, reaching over 150,000 dance professionals in various forms.

== Event ==
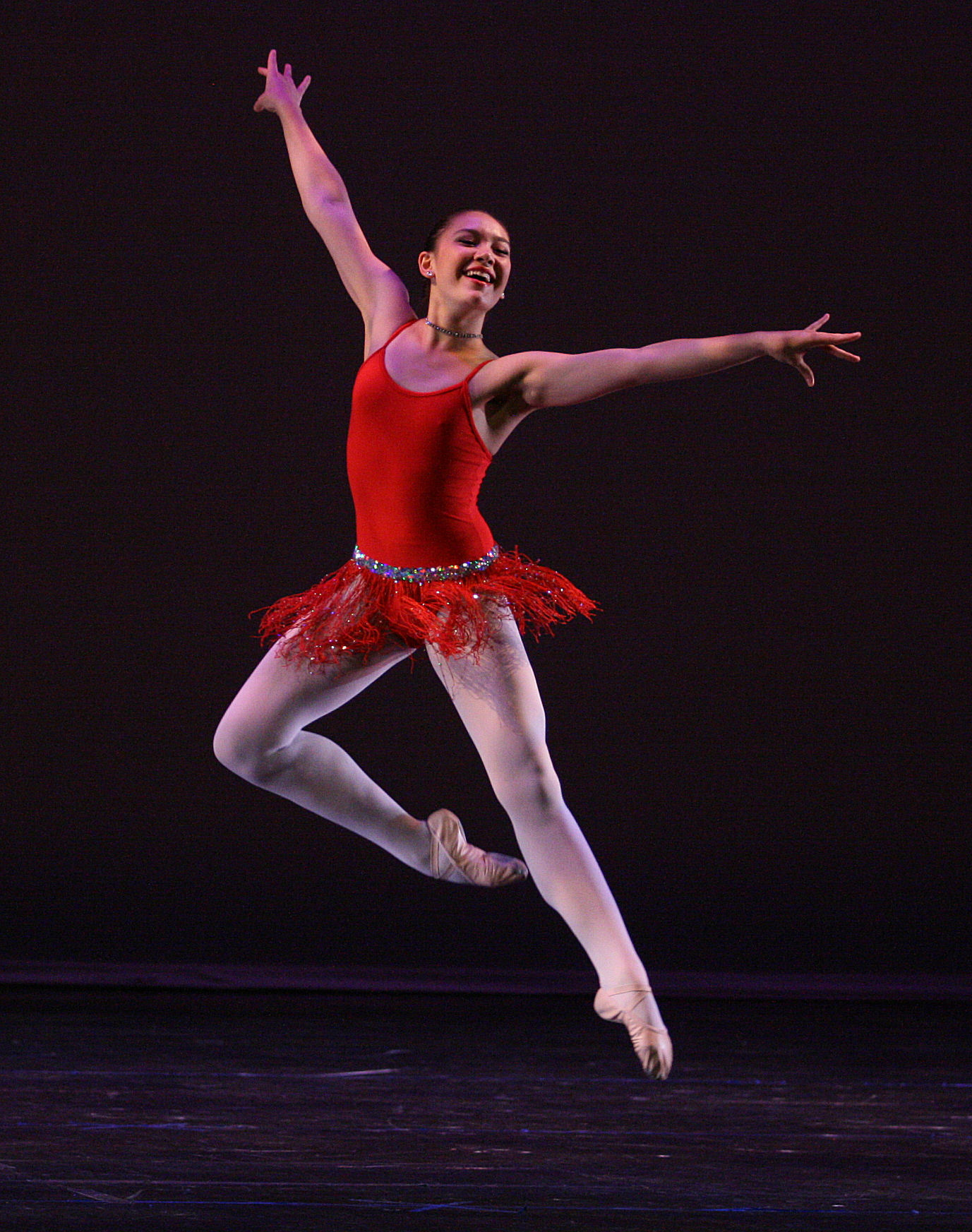
Ballet dancer on stage

On International Dance Day, celebrations are organised at UNESCO Headquarters and worldwide to host events such as special performances, dance nights, forums, seminars, exhibitions, masterclasses, and lectures.

Partners of UNESCO across the globe are encouraged to mark 29 April in their own country through special educational initiatives, humanitarian drives, dance performances and festivals.

In 2006, in collaboration with Kazakhstan, International Dance Day was celebrated across Central Asia. Dance professionals from Kazakhstan, Kyrgyzstan, Uzbekistan and Russia gathered for performances and competitions to mark the occasion.

In 2016 and 2017, the United Nations Postal Administration (UNPA) issued commemorative stamp series in honor of International Dance Day. Each set contained six stamps with continuous patterns paying tribute to various dance forms worldwide.

In 2017, CID partnered with the World Food Programme (WFP) to launch the "Dance to Zero Hunger" initiative. This project promoted healthy eating through dance education and raised awareness of global hunger issues. The initiative aimed to drive positive social change through dance while providing food aid to 80 million people worldwide.

In Shanghai 2017 for instance, the event became a three-day celebration with greater emphasis on education through dance workshops and presentations led by an international cast of dance experts. The evenings were reserved for performances, the finale of which was not the Gala Celebration. The Shanghai event also had a humanitarian aspect, with much of its focus being on celebrating the achievements of disabled dancers and encouraging disabled children to dance.
