= Kanne Kalaimaane (2022 TV series) =

- Genre: Family; Drama
- Written by: Deepika Ramani; Sivaramkumar (dialogues)
- Story by: Deepika Ramani
- Directed by: Raja Thanush
- Starring: Pavithra Gowda; Rashmi Prabhakar; Nandha; Navin Victor
- Theme music composer: Ilayavan
- Country of origin: India
- Original language: Tamil
- No. of seasons: 1
- No. of episodes: 361

Production
- Producer: P. Arunkumar
- Camera setup: Multi-Camera
- Running time: 22 minutes
- Production company: D Studio

Original release
- Network: Star Vijay
- Release: 10 October 2022 – 9 December 2023

Kanne Kalaimaane (transl. My Dear Gorgeous) is an Indian Tamil-language television series that premiered on 10 October 2022 in Star Vijay and ended on 9 December 2023, and digitally streams on Disney+ Hotstar.

The series depicts the story of young mother Banumathi, who is blind and she resides with her 8-year-old daughter Thamizh. It stars Pavithra Gowda, Rashmi Prabhakar, Nandha, and Navin Victor in lead roles. It is directed by Raja Thanush and produced by P. Arunkumar under the banner of D Studio.

== Cast ==
=== Main ===
- Pavithra Gowda as Banumathi Ram
- Rashmi Prabhakar as Madhuri Raghuram
- Navin Vetri as Ram/Raghuram (2023)
  - Nandha as Ram/Raghuram (2022-2023)
- Baby Samyuktha as Tamizh
- Sahasraa Kiran as Shalini

=== Supporting ===
- Devi Priya
- David Solomon Raja
- R. Aravindraj
- Premi Venkat / Usha Elizabeth Suraj as Vijaylakshmi
- Latha Rao
- Aadithyaa Manoj Kumar as Selva

== Production ==
=== Casting ===
Pavithra Gowda was selected for the female lead role of Banumathy in the series after her notable performances in the Colors Tamil's series Amman. Dance Master Nandha, a well-experienced actor who gained fame from his show Gokulathil Seethai, was chosen for the male lead role of Ram and Raghuram. But in end of October 2023, he quit the series, and was replaced by Navin Vetri. Kannada Actress Rashmi Prabhakar was selected for the other female lead role of Madhuri in the series after her notable performances in the Tamil series Arundhati, Kannada series Lakshmi Baramma and Telugu series Pournami. In April 2023, Premi Venkat was replaced by Usha Elizabeth Suraj.

=== Release ===
The serial was released on 10 October 2022, replacing Paavam Ganesan's 1.30PM slot on Star Vijay. The first promo video was released on 20 September 2022, featuring "Kaalam Eluthum Kathai Idhu" revealing the story was sung by Vaikom Vijayalakshmi. The second promo was unveiled on 6 October 2022, revealing the release date.

== Airing history ==
The show started airing on 10 October 2022. From Monday 4 December 2023, the show was shifted to 16.00 (IST), replacing Kizhakku Vaasal in that time slot. However, The series was ended with after one week telecast.
