= Kana Kanmani (2021 TV series) =

Malayalam Language Television show

- Genre: Soap opera
- Created by: Mahendar Dongari
- Screenplay by: Sreevalsan
- Directed by: Tanu Balak (Episode 1); G R Krishnan (Episode 2-7); Ruggu Ratheesh (Episode 8-)
- Starring: Vindhuja Vikraman; Jay Kartik
- Voices of: Devi S.
- Theme music composer: Jithin K Roshan (Music ) Deepak (Lyrics)
- Opening theme: "Kannana Kanne" by Gayathri Menon and Sree Shankar
- Country of origin: India
- Original language: Malayalam
- No. of seasons: 1
- No. of episodes: 290

Production
- Producer: Baiju Devaraj
- Cinematography: Laiju Aravind
- Editor: Santhosh Sridhar
- Camera setup: Multi camera
- Running time: 20-22 minutes
- Production company: Sandra's Communication (P) Ltd

Original release
- Network: Surya TV
- Release: 23 August 2021 – 23 July 2022

Related
- Indulekha

Kana Kanmani was an Indian Malayalam language soap opera premiered on 23 August 2021 aired on Surya TV. It stars Vindhuja Vikraman and Jay Kartik in lead roles along with M. B. Padmakumar, Ann Mathews and Revathi Krishna in supporting roles. It is a remake of Telugu television series Pournami that aired on Gemini TV. The show aired its last episode on 23 July 2022.

== Synopsis ==
Meera, a young woman, vies for the love of her father, who blames her for her mother's death. As a result, she does everything in her power to win him over but faces many challenges.

== Cast ==
=== Lead ===
- Vindhuja Vikraman as Meera Mahadevan Gautham: Radhika and Mahadevan's daughter; Yamuna's step-daughter; Preethi's half-sister; Gautham's wife.
- Jay Karthik as Gautham Kuberan: Bhagyalakshmi and Kuberan's son; Aparna's cousin; Meera's husband.
- M. B. Padmakumar as Mahadevan: Saraswathy's son; Radhika's widower; Yamuna's husband; Meera and Preethi's father; Swapna's arch-rival.

=== Recurring ===
- Ann Mathews as Yamuna Mahadevan: Chitra Sarojini daughter; Mahadevan's second wife; Preethi's mother; Meera's step-mother.
- Revathi Krishna as Preethi Mahadevan Akin: Mahadevan and Yamuna's daughter; Meera's half-sister; Akin's wife.
- Dr. Aishwarya Warrier / Geetha Nair as Saraswathy: Mahadevan's mother; Meera and Preethi's grandmother.
- Priya Prince as Swapna: A crooked businesswoman; Ishana's mother; Akin's aunt; Mahadevan's arch-rival.
- Akin M. A as Akin Madhav: Swapna's nephew; Preethi's husband.
- Mahesh as Kuberan: Bhagyalakshmi's husband; Gautham's father.
- Karthika Kannan as Bhagyalakshmi Kuberan: Renu's cousin; Kuberan's wife; Gautham's mother.
- Sreelakshmi Sreekumar as Ishana: Swapna's daughter
- Arjun Syam as Appu: An orphan boy adopted by Gautham and shares a sibling-like bond with him.
- Mahima / Sangeetha Sivan as Rajeshwari: Kadambariyamma's younger daughter; Radhika's sister.
- Amboori Jayan as Mani: Domestic help of Puthanmadathil house
- Aravind Bhasker as Vivek: Gautham's best friend who supports him in winning Meera's love.
- Bindu Murali as Sarojini: Chitra's aunt
- Subhash Nair as Bhargavan: Chitra's uncle
- Gayathri Varsha as Renu: Bhagyalakshmi's cousin; Aparna's mother
- Devika S as Aparna: Renu's daughter; Gautam's cousin

=== Guest ===
- K. R. Vijaya as Puthanmadathil Kadambariyamma: Radhika and Rajeshwari's mother; Meera's grandmother. (2021) (Dead)
- Abhirami as Radhika Mahadevan: Kadambariyamma's elder daughter; Rajeshwari's sister; Mahadevan's first wife; Meera's mother. (Dead)
- Rahul Ravi as Himself (Episode 53)
- Haritha G Nair as Herself (Episode 113)
- Dhanya Mary Varghese as Mercy Paul, a famous actress (Mahasangamam episode)
- Arathy Sojan as Kavya, Meera's friend (Mahasangamam episode)
- Reneesha Rahiman as Anjali, Meera's friend (Mahasangamam and wedding episode)
- Vishnu Nair as Adarsh, Kavya's husband (Mahasangamam episode)
- Jayaprakash as Abhijith, Anjali's husband (Mahasangamam and wedding episode)
- Anna Dona as Anupama (Wedding episode)
- Krish Menon as Indrajith (Wedding episode)
- Naveen Arakkal as Rudhra Prakash a.k.a. Rudhran: Rajeshwari's cousin (Wedding episode)
- Shanavas Shanu as Dinesh IPS, Mahadevan's friend (Wedding episode)

== Cross-over episodes ==
- From 15 January 2022 to 18 January 2022 it had a Mahasangamam with Manassinakkare.

== Adaptations ==
Language	Title	Original release	Network(s)	Last aired	Notes
Telugu	Pournami పౌర్ణమి	12 November 2018	Gemini TV	27 March 2021	Original
Kannada	Manasaare ಮನಸಾರೆ	24 February 2020	Udaya TV	13 November 2021	Remake
Tamil	Kannana Kanne கண்ணன கண்ணே	2 November 2020	Sun TV	4 March 2023	Remake
Bengali	Nayantara নয়নতারা	22 March 2021	Sun Bangla	30 April 2023	Remake
Malayalam	Kana Kanmani കാന കൺമണി	23 August 2021	Surya TV	23 July 2022	Remake
Marathi	Jau Nako Dur... Baba जाऊ नको दूर... बाबा	17 October 2021	Sun Marathi	4 November 2023	Remake
