= Kannana Kanne =

Indian TV series

- Genre: Drama; Family
- Written by: Mahendar Dongari; Bharathi Kannan; Dialogues; Narasimha Murthy Nallam
- Screenplay by: Vassegara Director Selva Bharathi
- Directed by: Dhanush
- Creative directors: K V Kiran Kumar; R.R. Eshwar
- Starring: Nimeshika Radhakrishnan; Babloo Prithiveeraj; Rahul Ravi
- Theme music composer: Sam C.S
- Opening theme: "Kannana Kanne" - K. S. Chitra
- Country of origin: India
- Original language: Tamil
- No. of seasons: 1
- No. of episodes: 722

Production
- Producers: A. Anbu Raja; G. Suraj; N. Subba Rao
- Cinematography: Saravanan; Venkatesh
- Editors: C.M Selva Kumar; Mathi YiD
- Camera setup: Multi-camera
- Running time: approx. 20–22 minutes per episode
- Production companies: SUN ENTERTAINMENT, AR Film World

Original release
- Network: Sun TV
- Release: 2 November 2020 – 4 March 2023

Related
- Pournami

Kannana Kanne was a 2020-2023 popular Indian Tamil-language family drama soap opera that aired on Sun TV from 2 November 2020 to 4 March 2023. The show starred Nimeshika Radhakrishnan with, Babloo Prithiveeraj, Rahul Ravi, Akshitha Boopiah and Nithya Das. The serial is a remake of Telugu television series Pournami that aired on Gemini TV.

== Plot ==
Gautham and Kausalya live a happy married life but, after ten years, they have no child. One day, Kausalya gets pregnant, but she learns that she is having complications. Gautham learns of this from Kausalya's doctor during her baby shower function. Gautham advises Kausalya to abort the baby to avoid risks, stating that he loves Kausalya so much and he can't risk her life for the baby. However, Kausalya doesn't listen to him. Eventually, she dies during labour and gives birth to a baby girl, named as Meera by Kausalya's mother-in-law and Gautham's mother, Dhanalakshhmi. Gautham doesn't accept his wife’s death and ends up blaming Meera for her death, growing unreasonable hatred towards her since her birth. But Dhanalakshhmi raises Meera affectionately.

=== 3 years later ===
A young woman named Chitra from Chithoor suffers due to poverty and her mother is ill and thus, needs a huge amount of money for her medical treatment. She seeks help from her greedy maternal uncle Rangareddy, who suggests Chitra to ask the rich Kumarababu for help. When Kumarababu sees Chitra, he get attracted to her and agrees to help her on the condition that she stays with him for one day. Rangareddy informs Chitra of Kumarababu's condition. Though initially hesitant, she reluctantly accepts for her mother. She pays for her mother's treatment and later goes to Kumarababu's house abiding by his condition. At the same time, Gautam visits a temple along with Dhanalakshmi and Meera in Chithoor. He plans to get rid of Meera during the visit and asks his mother to hand over Meera to him so that she can get closer dharshan of the lord's idol in the temple. Dhanalakshmi happily hands over Meera to Gautham for him to take care of Meera thinking that he has finally accepted her as his daughter and goes closer to the idol of the lord in temple blissfully unaware of Gautham's plan to abandon Meera. He finds a truck filled with goods and leaves Meera in the truck which Dhanalakshmi witnesses and scolds Gautham for his evil act. She runs after the truck calling out for her granddaughter, Meera. The truck enters the house of Kumarababu and Meera coincidentally goes into the room where Kumarababu attempts to force himself on Chitra. She starts calling Chitra as her mother causing Kumarababu to stop and by that time, Dhanalakshmi reaches the scene but gets attacked by Kumarababu's goons. Gautham gets enraged by his mother getting attacked and is ensued into a fight with Kumarababu. Circumstances lead to the village president ordering Gautham to marry Chitra as everyone assumes that Meera is Chitra and Gautham's daughter who was born before their marriage. With no choice left, he marries Chitra and later they live together happily and Chitra changes her name to Yamuna, embracing her new life with Gautham. A girl is born to them and she is named as Preethi, Meera's half-sister.

=== 20 years later ===
Meera, a beautiful and well-raised woman, is now grown up. But till now, her father Gautam hates and blames her for his first wife's death. Meera lives in a house with her grandmother, stepmother (Yamuna) and half-sister (Preethi), who try their best to reunite Meera and her father. Meera craves for the love and attention from her father.

Meera falls in love with Yuvaraj but hides her feelings to her family due to her father's hatred. Situations lead to her half-sister getting engaged to Yuva. She eventually asks Yuva to forget her and marry Preethi, obeying Gautham. Yuva reluctantly agrees to the wedding but still misses Meera. Yuva's paternal aunt, Renuka arrives and tries to get Yuva and her daughter, Aparna to get married. However, Aparna uses her mother's plans for her marriage with Yuva to unite Meera and Yuva as she is aware of their relationship. On the day of wedding, Preethi claims that she's in love with Santhosh and will not marry Yuva. Yamuna and Meera's maternal aunt Vasuki(Late Kausalya's younger sister) plans to marry off Meera to Yuva and convince everyone to agree, taking advantage of the situation . Gautham reluctantly agrees to save himself from humiliation and Yuva happily marries Meera. After marriage, Yuva and Meera go to Yuva's house but Yuva's father does not accept their marriage as he wanted a bride from a wealthy family and believes that Meera will not inherit anything from Gautham considering their strained relationship. He throws them out of the house. Then Yamuna takes the newly wed couple into their house and Gautham accepts their stay. But, Gautam starts to ignore Preethi and Yamuna as they caused the chaos on the day of marriage, believing that they were disloyal to him.

Meera later finds out that Preethi doesn't reciprocate Santhosh's love and only used her situation to help Yuva marry Meera. Although she was attracted to Yuva at first, she later plans to unite him with Meera as she knew that Meera is already suffering a lot due to lack of love from her father and didn't want to hurt her further. Meera decides to unite Preethi and Santosh aware of Santhosh's good nature. Later, Gautham invites Santhosh to his home to make a deal of leaving Preethi for a large amount of money. But Santhosh wins Gautham's heart and Gautham accepts Santhosh and Preethi's love. However, it is then revealed that Santhosh is in fact evil and he is the nephew of Gautham's business enemy Menaka, who plans to ruin his family by making Preethi marry Santhosh. Meera learns of this and tries her best to stop the wedding along with Yuva, but fails. Gautham is shocked to discover Santhosh's real identity after the marriage. Menaka demands Gautham to give up all his wealth and property so that Preethi can live happily. Gautham does so and is forced to leave the house alongside Meera and the rest of his family.

As Gautam's family falls into poverty, the family settles in a small and modest house and starts a canteen business along with a small hotel, which becomes immensely successful. Soon, Preethi learns of her family's poor financial condition who was made to believe by Menaka and Santhosh that her family has left the house to visit Rameshwaram and ends up leaving Santosh's house to stay with her own family. The story now follows on how Meera and Yuva will restore their family to their original status amidst Menaka's attempts to stop them and Meera's slow but ever growing bond with her father Gautam.

Gautham starts to grow affection for Meera after seeing her sacrifices for the family and him in the process of regaining what they had lost. They later visit their native place with Santhosh and Preethi while Menaka sends Kishore to assassinate Meera. But Vasuki gets killed in the process. After completing the rituals, the family members file a complaint in police station in order to punish Vasuki's killer. Meera eventually finds out about Kishore and his relation to Menaka. She continuouly tries to pursue him into revealing the truth and manages to get the truth about Vasuki's death and records it. But he escapes.

After this incident, Yuva and his friends goes to Yercaud on account of important work where Yuva encounters Kishore. He tries to chase Kishore but disappears alarming his friends. They inform Meera and the family of Yuva's disappearance. Panicked, Meera and Gautham set off to Yercaud in search of Yuva and finds him after lots of struggle while the police arrests Kishore for his crimes. Later, they come across many hindrances and problems due to Menaka's plot to ruin them along with her mother, Maragadham.

Later, Meera gets pregnant and moves out of the house with Yuva, believing that her stay in the house till the birth of her child might endanger Gautham's life.Hence, she decides to stay away from her family for a brief period. Gautham and the rest of the family desperately searches for Meera and Yuva after learning about Meera's pregnancy. After 9 months, Meera goes into labour amidst many issues during her prenatal period caused by Menaka. A girl child is born to her. Gautham and rest of the family arrives at the hospital to meet Meera, Yuva and their newborn girl child who is believed to be the reincarnation of Meera's late mother, Kausalya. Gautham finally accepts Meera as his first and elder daughter. The show ends on a happy note.

== Cast ==
=== Main ===
- Nimeshika Radhakrishnan as Meera: Gautham and Kaushalya's daughter; Yamuna's step-daughter; Preethi's half-sister; Yuva's wife
- Rahul Ravi as Yuvaraj alias Yuva: Pushpa and Kodeeswaran's son; Aparna's cousin; Preethi's ex-love interest; Meera's husband
- Babloo Prithiveeraj as Gauthamkrishna alias Gautham: Dhanalakshmi's son; Kaushalya's widower; Yamuna's husband; Meera and Preethi's father; Menaka’s arch-rival, Yuva's father in law

=== Supporting ===
- Nithya Das (2020-2022) as Yamuna/ Chitthoor Chitra: Saroja's daughter; Gautham's second wife; Preethi's mother; Meera's step-mother
  - Vinodhini (2022-2023) as Yamuna/Chittoor Chitra (Replacement of Nithya Das)
- Akshitha Bopaiah as Preethi: Gautham and Yamuna's daughter; Meera's half-sister; Santhosh's wife
- Maanas Chavali as Santosh Kumar alias Santhosh: Menaka's nephew; Swapna's cousin; Preeti's husband
- Sulakshana as Dhanalakshmi: Gautham's mother; Meera and Preethi's grandmother
- Priya Prince as Menaka: Maragatham's daughter; Swapna's mother; Gautham's arch-rival (Main Antagonist)
- Fouziee as Swapna: Menaka's daughter; Santhosh's cousin
- Swathi Thara as Deepika: Yuva's MD
- Geetha Ravishanker as Maragatham: Menaka's mother; Santosh and Swapna's grandmother
- Nithya Ravindran / Uma Rani / Shanthi Anandraj as Pushpa: Kodeeshwaran's wife; Yuva's mother
- Shanthi Arvind as Renuka: Kodeeshwaran's sister; Aparna's mother
- J. Livingston as Kodeeshwaran: Renuka's brother; Pushpa's husband; Yuva's father
- Sahana Shetty as Aparna: Renuka's daughter; Yuva's cousin
- Preethi Sanjeev as Vasuki: Kamala's younger daughter; Kausalya's sister (Deceased)
- Geetha Narayan as Nallamangai: a lawyer
- Singapore Deepan as Spot payment Singaram
- Sidharth Kapilavayi as Karuna: Kulandaivelu's brother
- NS Madeshwaran as Kulandaivelu: Financier; Karuna's elder brother
- Pondy Ravi as Harichandran
- Saakshi Siva as Kishore
- Sachana as Madhumati: Kishore’s daughter
- Varshini Venkat as Inspector Poonguzhali
- Nikhil as Anbu alias Dhoni: Yuva's adoptive brother
- Manoj Kumar as Veeraian: Vasuki's helper
- Ashok Kumar as Jeeva: Yuva's best friend
- Ashwini Selvam as Roshana: Yuva's best friend
- Devi Teju as Soorna: Chitra's aunt
- Jayakumar as Rangareddy: Chitra's uncle
- Balaji as Babu: Menaka's helper
- Subha geetha as Kavitha

=== Special appearance ===
- Ineya as Kausalya: Kamala's elder daughter; Vasuki's sister; Gautham's first wife; Meera's mother (Deceased; but appeared as a doctor in the climax episode)
- Robo Shankar as Shankar: Gautam's best friend in Preeti's birthday celebration
- Indraja Shankar as Indraja: Shankar's daughter in Preeti's birthday celebration
- Divya Sridhar as Bharathi: In Preethi's birthday
- Priyanka Nalkari as Roja Arjun: In Mahasangamam, from Roja serial
- Sibbu Suryan as Arjun Prathap: In Mahasangamam, from Roja serial
- Krishna Raghunandan as Vijay: Yuva's friend in Preeti and Yuva's marriage celebration
- Shruthi Raj as Isai: Meera's friend in Preeti and Yuva's marriage celebration
- Riyaz Khan as Dharmadurai: Meera's uncle Preeti and Yuva's marriage celebration
- Ganesh Venkataraman as Assistant Commissioner Dinesh: Gautam's friend in Preeti and Yuva's marriage celebration
- Nandan Loganathan as Kavin: Gautam's friend; Mallika Devi's son in Preeti and Yuva's marriage celebration
- Preethi Sharma as Venba: Kavin's wife in Preeti and Yuva's marriage celebration
- Anuradha as Kamala: Kaushalya and Vasuki's mother; Meera's grandmother (Deceased)
- Kiruba as Chitoor Saroja: Yamuna's mother; Preethi's grandmother (Dead)
- Sakshi Agarwal as Herself: Guest in Kousalya's birthday celebration

== Adaptations ==
Language	Title	Original release	Network(s)	Last aired	Notes
Telugu	Pournami పౌర్ణమి	12 November 2018	Gemini TV	27 March 2021	Original
Kannada	Manasaare ಮನಸಾರೆ	24 February 2020	Udaya TV	13 November 2021	Remake
Tamil	Kannana Kanne கண்ணான கண்ணே	2 November 2020	Sun TV	4 March 2023	Remake
Bengali	Nayantara নয়নতারা	22 March 2021	Sun Bangla	30 April 2023	Remake
Malayalam	Kana Kanmani കാന കൺമണി	23 August 2021	Surya TV	23 July 2022	Remake
Marathi	Jau Nako Dur... Baba जाऊ नको दूर... बाबा	17 October 2021	Sun Marathi	4 November 2023	Remake

== Soundtrack ==
Track list
No.	Title	Lyrics	Music	Singer(s)	Length
1.	"Kannana Kanne"	GKB	Sam C. S.	K. S. Chitra	3:14
2.	"Devathai Polavae Vanthaai"	Shabareesh Varma	Sam C. S.	GV Prakash Kumar	1:07

The titular soundtrack, named Kannana Kanne, was sung by Carnatic musician K. S. Chitra. The song's music and background score was composed by Sam C. S.
