= Jau Nako Dur... Baba =

Indian television series

- Genre: Drama
- Starring: See below
- Country of origin: India
- Original language: Marathi
- No. of episodes: 659

Production
- Producer: Harshada Khanvilkar
- Production location: Mumbai
- Camera setup: Multi-camera
- Running time: 22 minutes

Original release
- Network: Sun Marathi
- Release: 17 October 2021 – 4 November 2023

Related
- Pournami

Jau Nako Dur... Baba (transl. Don't go away... Dad) is an Indian Marathi language drama series starring Astad Kale, Suyash Tilak, Adwait Kadne and Mayuri Kapadane in lead roles. It premiered on Sun Marathi from 17 October 2021 and ended on 4 November 2023. It is an official remake of Gemini TV series Pournami.

== Synopsis ==
Gautam despises his daughter Arpita as he holds her responsible for losing his beloved wife and immense wealth on the day she was born. Despite tying the knot with Yuvraj, the love of her life, Arpita yearns to win over her father’s love.

Arpita along with her daughter chiu(Jr Shubhda) and aunt lives with Dr Nachiket and his family. As Yuvraj cheats on Arpita she keeps his daughter being alive a secret and raises her daughter along with Dr Nachiket. As destiny unfolds Yuvraj finds out about the truth of his daughter, but decides to let Nachiket be the father for better good.

== Cast ==
=== Main ===
- Mayuri Kapadane as Arpita "Appu" Jahagirdar Deshmukh – Gautam and Shubhada's daughter; Manjiri's step-daughter; Priya's half-sister; Yuvraj's ex-wife; Nachiket's wife; Jr. Shubhada's mother
- Astad Kale as Gautam Jahagirdar – Shubhada and Manjiri's widower; Arpita and Priya's father; Jr. Shubhada's grandfather
- Adwait Kadne as Yuvraj – Arpita's ex-husband; Priya's ex-fiancé; Jr. Shubhada's father
- Suyash Tilak as Dr. Nachiket Deshmukh – Arpita's husband; Jr. Shubhada's step-father

=== Recurring ===
- Aadhiki Kasbe as Jr. Shubhada "Chiu" Deshmukh – Arpita and Yuvraj's daughter; Nachiket's step-daughter
- Poorva Gokhale as Shubhada Jahagirdar – Vasudha's sister; Gautam's first wife; Arpita's mother; Jr. Shubhada's grandmother
- Rujuta Deshmukh as Manjiri Jahagirdar – Gautam's second wife; Priya's mother; Arpita's step-mother; Jr. Shubhada's step-grandmother
- Sharvari Jog as Priya "Pihu" Jahagirdar – Gautam and Manjiri's daughter; Arpita's half-sister; Yuvraj's ex-fiancée; Neil's wife
- Siddhesh Prabhakar as Neil – Menaka's nephew; Priya's husband
- Swapnali Patil as Vasudha – Shubhada's sister; Arpita's aunt; Jr. Shubhada's grandaunt
- Shubha Godbole as Mrs. Jahagirdar – Gautam's mother; Arpita and Priya's grandmother; Jr. Shubhada's great-grandmother
- Meghali Juvekar as Surekha – Menaka's accomplice
- Minal Bal as Menaka – Gautam's rival

=== Cameo Appearances ===
- Tejashri Pradhan
- Pushkar Jog

== Adaptations ==
Language	Title	Original release	Network(s)	Last aired	Notes
Telugu	Pournami పౌర్ణమి	12 November 2018	Sun Gemini	27 March 2021	Original
Kannada	Manasaare ಮನಸಾರೆ	24 February 2020	Sun Udaya	13 November 2021	Remake
Tamil	Kannana Kanne கண்ணன கண்ணே	2 November 2020	Sun TV	4 March 2023	Remake
Bengali	Nayantara নয়নতারা	22 March 2021	Sun Bangla	30 April 2023	Remake
Malayalam	Kana Kanmani കാന കൺമണി	23 August 2021	Sun Surya	23 July 2022	Remake
Marathi	Jau Nako Dur... Baba जाऊ नको दूर... बाबा	17 October 2021	Sun Marathi	4 November 2023	Remake
