= Vidyashree Jayaram =

Indian television actress

- Born: 9 January 1997 (age 29)
- Occupation: Actress
- Years active: 2019–present
- Known for: Kavyanjali

Vidyashree Jayaram is an Indian television actress who predominantly works in the Kannada industry. She is well known for her role as Kavya in the Kannada soap opera, Kavyanjali.

== Career ==
Vidyashree began her career with Colors Kannada's dance reality show Thakadhimitha.

She made her acting debut in 2019 with Star Suvarna's Varalakshmi Stores. She starred as Kavya in Udaya TV's Kavyanjali from 2020 to 2022. Since March 2022, she is reprising her role of Kavya in Kavyanjali's Malayalam remake Manassinakkare.

From July 2022, she is playing the lead role in Star Suvarna's Ardhangi.

== Filmography ==
=== Television ===
Year	Show	Role	Channel	Language	Notes	Ref.
2019	Thakadhimitha	Contestant	Colors Kannada	Kannada		
2019	Varalakshmi Stores	Ramya	Star Suvarna	Kannada		
2020–2022	Kavyanjali	Kavya Siddarth Arus	Udaya TV	Kannada		
2020–2021	Manasaare	Kavya Siddarth Arus	Udaya TV	Kannada	Guest appearance	
2020–2021	Yaarivalu	Kavya Siddarth Arus	Udaya TV	Kannada	Guest appearance	
2022	Manassinakkare	Kavya Aadharsh	Surya TV	Malayalam		
2022	Ardhangi	Aditi	Star Suvarna	Kannada		
2022	Madhumagalu	Kavya	udaya TV	Kannada		
2022	Bhavana	Kavya	Surya TV	Malayalam	Cameo in promo	
