= Rashmi Prabhakar =

Indian actress

- Born: Bangalore, Karnataka, India
- Occupation: Actress
- Years active: 2014–present

Rashmi Prabhakar is an Indian television actress. She predominantly acts in Kannada and Telugu industries. She is known for her role in the Kannada television series, Lakshmi Baramma.

== Early life ==
Rashmi grew up in Kodi, a small village on the outskirts of Bangalore, near Hoskote taluk. Her father being a farmer has very well taught her the value of life and importance of things. She spent most of her childhood in the Village. She also did her schooling in bright school Hoskote where she was popular among the kids for her sports, dance, extra curricular activities. She then did her PU in sai satyanarayana college where she was more into extra curricular activities too. She took her studies seriously when she got into her degree in seshadripuram college where was a topper among the batch in computer's field. She was campus placed in two of the leading IT companies. Her passion to become news reader made her quit her big job and join a news channel as well for sometime but later she found her mark in the small screen.

== Career ==
Rashmi made her debut in acting from serial Shubhavivaha where she played as hero's sister, serial was a popular one back then and people recognized Rashmi as rachana. She then got an offer to act in a mythological serial Mahabharata where she played as duryodhan's sister. Turning point was of from Jeevana Chaitra where she played as dodmalli, when the serial was on air from which she even got to act in a Tamil serial and she made her major breakthrough was when she got an offer to play as Lakshmi for Lakshmi Baramma which quite changed her name to chinnu and she stepped into higher scales. She has even acted in a film Bb5, a suspense thriller where she played as 2nd lead along with Radhika Narayan which had mixed reviews in the box office. Currently, she is acting in Pournami for Gemini TV and it's quite popular among the Telugu audience. After pournami got ended, now she's currently acting in Kavyanjali serial

== Television ==
=== Serials ===
Year	Film	Role	Language	Channel	Notes
2014	Shubha Vivaha	Rachana	Kannada	Zee Kannada	
2015	Mahabharatha	Dushala & Ambe	Kannada	Udaya TV	
2015	Jeevana Chaitra	Doddmalli	Kannada	Star Suvarna	
2016-2017	Arundhati	Sanghavi	Tamil	Raj TV	
2017–2020	Lakshmi Baramma	Lachi / Chinnu	Kannada	Colors Kannada	
2018–2021	Pournami	Pournami/ Vennela	Telugu	Gemini TV	
2020–2021	Manasella Neene	Raaga	Kannada	Star Suvarna	
2021–2023	Kavyanjali	Kavya	Telugu	Gemini TV	
2022 – 2023	Kanne Kalaimaane	Madhuri	Tamil	Star Vijay	
2023-2024	Krishna Mukunda Murari	Mukunda	Telugu	Star Maa	

=== Movies ===
Year	Film	Role	Language	Notes
2018	BB5	Ramya	Kannada	Released
2019	Mahakavya		Kannada	Released
