= Akshata Deshpande =

Indian television actress

- Born: 19 September 1999 (age 26); Belgaum, Karnataka, India
- Occupation: Actress
- Years active: 2018–present

Akshata Deshpande (born 19 September 1999) is an Indian television actress best known for her work on Tamil and Kannada television, including a lead role in the serial Mathe Vasantha.

== Career ==
Deshpande started her career in modelling. She made her acting debut with Mathe Vasantha on Star Suvarna, along with Rakshit in lead role. She replaced Deepa Jagadeesh in the Kannada Serial Kavyanjali on Udaya TV.

In 2023, Akshata debuted in her first Tamil thriller serial, Anamika, which airs on Sun TV.

== Television ==
| Year | Title | Role | Notes | Ref. |
|---|---|---|---|---|
| 2018 | AmruthaVarshini | Amrutha "Ammu" and Varshini "Varsha" | | |
| 2020–2021 | Mathe Vasantha | Ambika | | |
| 2021 | Suvrana Superstar | Guest | | |
| 2020–2022 | Kavyanjali | Anjali | | |
| 2022–2024 | Kateyondu Shuruvagide | Krithi | | |
| 2024–2025 | Anamika | Anamika | Tamil debut | |
| 2024–present | Ninnu Kori | Chandrakala | Telugu debut | |
| 2024–2026 | Chikkejamani | Kaveri | | |
