= Srinidhi =

Srinidhi is an Indian given name referring to Vishnu. It may refer to:

- Srinidhi Shetty, Indian actress
- Yamuna Srinidhi, Indian dancer
