= Manassinakkare (TV series) =

Indian Malayalam TV series

- Genre: Soap operas; Romance; Drama
- Directed by: Saji Surendran
- Starring: Vidyashree Jayaram; Reneesha Rahiman; Vishnu Nair; Jay Prakash
- Country of origin: India
- Original language: Malayalam
- No. of seasons: 1
- No. of episodes: 411

Production
- Camera setup: Multi-Camera
- Running time: 18-27 minutes

Original release
- Network: Surya TV
- Release: 23 August 2021 – 26 November 2022

Related
- Kavyanjali

Manassinakkare (transl. Beyond the Mind) is an Indian Malayalam-language soap opera. The show premiered on 23 August 2021 and ended on 26 November 2022 on Surya TV and starred Vidyashree Jayaram, Reneesha Rahiman, Vishnu Nair and Jay Prakash in lead roles. It airs on Surya TV and on-demand through Sun NXT. It is an official remake of Kannada series Kavyanjali.

== Plot ==
The story revolves around the two cousins Kavya and Anjali who are sisters not by birth but by heart. Kavya is a self-centred and obsessed whereas Anjali is selfless and caring. Kavya was in a relationship with Abhijith. But she dominated and controlled him. Later he realised the difference between obsession and true love after he gets closed with Anjali. Soon he fell in love with Anjali. Meanwhile, Anjali's father died unfortunately. This made Abhijith even more liking Anjali.

On the day of wedding, Kavya learns of Abhijith's love for Anjali. She made Abhijith and Anjali marriage despite Anjali's displeasure. On the same day, Kavya marries Aadharsh; Abhijith's brother, causing Kavya's mother to hate Anjali. Abhijith's mother Suhasini hates Anjali because of past bitterness. Radhika, who is Shankar's sister likes Anjali and considers her as a daughter. Anjali had secured a good place in Radhika's heart. Kavya, Aadharsh, Abhijith and Radhika supports Anjali. But Suhasini and Kavya's mother Renuka hate Anjali.

Later it is revealed that Abhijith is Suhasini's foster son and his father is Shankar. Kavya and Anjali found that, Abhijith's biological mother is Suhasini's sister and also revealed to Kavya and Anjali that, whole property belongs to Abhijith's. They also find that Shankar is the real villain and he tries to destroy the reputation of Suhasini's business. The 'Kavyanjali' duo fight against Shankar and made efforts to expose him in front of all. Now Parvathi who is Aadharsh's former love interest appears. She became friends with Kavya and Anjali. Suhasini offers her a job in their company, without knowing Parvathi's real identity.

== Cast ==
=== Main cast ===
- Arathy Sojan (2021–2022) / Vidyashree Jayaram (2022) as Kavya Aadharsh
- Ashwathy Ash (2021) / Reneesha Rahiman (2021–2022) as Anjali Abhijith a.k.a. Anju
- Vishnu Nair (2021–2022; 2022) / Renjith Menon (2022) as Aadharsh Shankar a.k.a. Aadhi
- Jay Prakash as Abhijith Shankar a.k.a. Abhi (2021–2022)

=== Recurring cast ===
- Jennifer Antony as Suhasini Shankar
  - Aadharsh and Rithu's mother
  - Abhijith's foster mother
- Rohith Ved as Shankar
  - Suhasini's husband
- Divya Sreedhar as Radhika
  - Shankar's sister
- Shamnad Fasaludheen as Shamnad
  - Manager of DUKE empire
- Poornima Anand / Lekshmi Prasad as Maya
  - Anjali's mother
- Renjini Menon / Sumi Santhosh / Saritha Balakrishnan as Renuka
  - Kavya's mother
- Nayana Josan / Ruby Jewel as Rithu
- Rajeev Pala / Rahul Mohan as Madhavan
  - Kavya's father
- Shilpa Martin as Parvathi Nambiar
  - Aadharsh's ex-love
- Bindhu Ramakrishnan as Rukku amma
  - Suhasini's relative
- Balaji Sarma as City Police Commissioner
- T.S Raju
- Arun Mohan
- Jishin Mohan
- Deepa Jayan
- Neena Kurup as Swamini
- Deepika Mohan as Mother Superior
- J Padmanabhan Thampi as Shankoothy ammavan
- Lishoy as Mohan (died in serial)
  - Anjali's father
  - Madhavan's elder brother

=== Cameo appearances ===
- Dhanya Mary Varghese as Mercy Paul, a popular film actress (Mahasangamam episode)
- Vindhuja Vikraman as Meera Mahadevan (Mahasangamam episode)
- Jay Kartik as Gautham (Mahasangamam episode)
- Revathi Krishna as Preethi Mahadevan (Mahasangamam episode)
- Ann Mathews as Yamuna (Mahasangamam episode)
- Priya Prince as Swapna (Mahasangamam episode)
- Anish Rehman as Dancer (Mega episode-Wedding)
- Chandra Lakshman as Sujatha (Mega episode-Wedding)

== Production ==
=== Development ===
Manassinakkare is an official remake of Kannada television series Kavyanjali.

=== Casting ===
Arathy Sojan who rose into fame through Pookkalam Varavayi played one of the female leads, Kavya. Aswathy, who played the other female lead, Anjali was replaced by Reneesha Rahiman. Vishnu Nair and Jay Prakash played the male leads. Jennifer Antony and Rohit Ved were also cast in pivotal roles.

In October 2021, actress Chandra Lakshman played a cameo as Sujatha, her on-screen character from Swantham Sujatha. Actor-dancer Aneesh Rahman also made a special appearance. In March 2022, both lead actors Arathy and Vishnu exited the show. Vidyashree Jayaram who played Kavya in the show's original Kavyanjali replaced Arathy. Renjith Menon replaced Vishnu temporarily.

=== Cross-over episode ===
From 15 January 2022 to 18 January 2022 Manassinakkare had a Mahasangamam with Kana Kanmani.

== Adaptations ==
Language	Title	Original release	Network(s)	Last aired	Notes	Ref.
Kannada	Kavyanjali ಕಾವ್ಯಾಂಜಲಿ	3 August 2020	Udaya TV	26 February 2022	Original	
Bengali	Mom Palak মা পলক	26 April 2021	Sun Bangla	27 March 2022	Remake	
Malayalam	Manassinakkare മനസ്സിനക്കരെ	23 August 2021	Surya TV	26 November 2022	Remake	
Telugu	Kavyanjali కావ్యాంజలి	23 August 2021	Gemini TV	14 January 2023	Remake	
