= Jayashree Raj =

Indian actress, producer, and director

- Born: Karnataka, India
- Other name: Jaishree
- Occupation: Actress
- Years active: 1997–present
- Spouse(s): Ganesh Prasad (m. 2002–2006) Rakesh Chandru
- Children: 1

Jayashree Raj is an Indian actress, television host, producer and director known for her work in Kannda television and cinema. After beginning her career as an actress with Kathegara, Jayashree has gone on to appear in more than 50 television serials, and 20 films. She turned director and producer with Aramane in 2017 with her husband Rakesh Chandru, before they produced Kasturi Nivasa two years later. In addition to Kannada, Jayashree has also acted in Tamil and Telugu serials.

== Early life ==
Jayashree hails from Karnataka. Her parents Rajanna and Jagadamba ran a pharmacy store in Bangalore. Jayashree did her schooling there at the Nehru Smaraka Vidya Kendra Trust. Jayashree did not rceive formal education after her matriculation, considering she began screen acting when in school. While in school, she was an athlete and represented her school as a volleyball and a kho kho player. She also trained as a classical dancer. She earned a bachelor's degree in arts from Mysore Open University. In an interview with Deccan Herald in 2001, Jayashree recalled that she was first noticed by popular television director T. N. Seetharam, who offered a role in his serial, Mayamruga.

== Career ==
Jayashree made her screen debut in the mid-1990s with the television serial titled Kathegara, which was a collection of short stories adapted to the small screen, in P. Lankesh's Umapatiya Scholarship Yatre, when she was 13. In Seetharam's Mayamruga, she played the second daughter of Shastri. Jayashree would go on to star in multiple serials in the mid- to late-1990s, often appearing in serials that would run parallelly, considering most serials during the time ran to 13, 26 or 52 episodes. Some of them include Chakra which was aired on DD Chandana, and Minchumareyadavaru, Sulivu, Haavina Hejje, Chaduranga and Kathasagara. Jayashree also compered a musical programme Sangeetha Sagara, and hosted a talk show titled Namaste ETV in 2001.

Jayashree's film debut came in Ravichandran's Preethsod Thappa (1998). She played the daughter of Srinivasa Murthy's character. She would go on to play supporting roles in Sparsha (2000), Bannada Hejje (2000) and Majnu (2001).

Jayashree would go on to play lead roles in mega serials such Rathasapthami, Guptagamini and Punyakoti, all of which completed 1,000 episodes. However, in 2014, after acting roles dried up, she turned to direction. In 2017, along with her husband Rakesh Chandru, she produced and directed Aramane for Udaya TV. She called the project being "...like an oasis for a thirsty traveller in a desert." It was her 50th serial as an actress. In 2019, the couple produced Kasturi Nivasa. In addition to production, Jayashree continued to act in serials. In 2025, she appeared in Telugu serials such as Padamati Sandhyaragam and Malli. In Jhansi, a courtroom drama, she played a lawyer Mrunalini, who has confrontations with the titular character.

== Personal life ==
Jayashree has been married twice. She was first married to Ganesh Prasad, a US-based engineer, in April 2002. The couple divorced in November 2006. They had a daughter together, Anagha Abhivandana. Jayashree is presently married to Chandrashekhar, also known as Rakesh Chandru, a television actor and director. They met on the sets of Brungada Benneri, which had Jayashree playing the lead role in, and Chandru serving as production manager. They would go on to star together in Samaagama. In an interview with Deccan Herald in 2017, Jayashree mentioned that she has been married to him for 14 years.

== Filmography ==
=== Television ===
- All television serials are in Kannada, unless otherwise noted.

Year	Title	Role	Notes	Ref.
1997	Kathegara			
1997	Mayamruga	Sharada		
	Janani			
	Sangama			
	Suptamanasina Saptaswaragalu			
	Samagaama	Chanchala		
	Chakra			
	Minchumareyadavaru			
	Sulivu			
	Haavina Hejje			
	Chaduranga			
	Kathasagara			
	Sangeetha Sagara	Presenter		
2001	Bhargavi			
2001	Sahana		Tamil serial	
2001	Chandrabimba			
2001	Namaste ETV	Host		
2002	Manvanthara			
	Brungada Benneri			
–2014	Rathasapthami			
	Guptagamini			
	Punyakoti			
	Sangeetha Samagamam	Host	Malayalam reality show	
–2014	Mukta Mukta	Niveditha		
–2014	Shubhamangala			
2014	Seere Beka Seere	Host		
2016–2020	Naagini	Nagarani		
2017	Aramane		Also director and producer	
2018	Bigg Boss Kannada	Self	Season 6	
2019–2022	Kasturi Nivasa	Durga	Cameo; also producer	
2019	Devayani			
2021	Ninnindale			
2024	Chukki Tare	Yashoda Karve		
2025	Jhansi	Mrunalini	Telugu serial	
2025–	Padamati Sandhyaragam	Janaki	Telugu serial	
2025	Malli		Telugu serial	

=== Film ===
Year	Title	Role	Notes	Ref.
1998	Preethsod Thappa			
2000	Sparsha			
2000	Bannada Hejje			
2001	Majnu			
2007	Honganasu	Shilpa		
2007	Meera Madhava Raghava			
2007	Cheluvina Chittara			
2008	Chaitrada Chandrama			
2008	Inthi Ninna Preethiya	Kalyani		
2010	Sugreeva			
2012	Anna Bond			
2013	Cool Ganesha			
2014	Baanaadi	Girija		
2014	Dil Rangeela			
2016	Priyanka			
2016	John Jani Janardhan			
2019	Eesha Mahesha			
2025	Sanju Weds Geetha 2			
2025	Guri			

== See also ==
- List of Indian television actresses
