= Sushmitha Bhat =

Indian actress and dancer (born 1994)

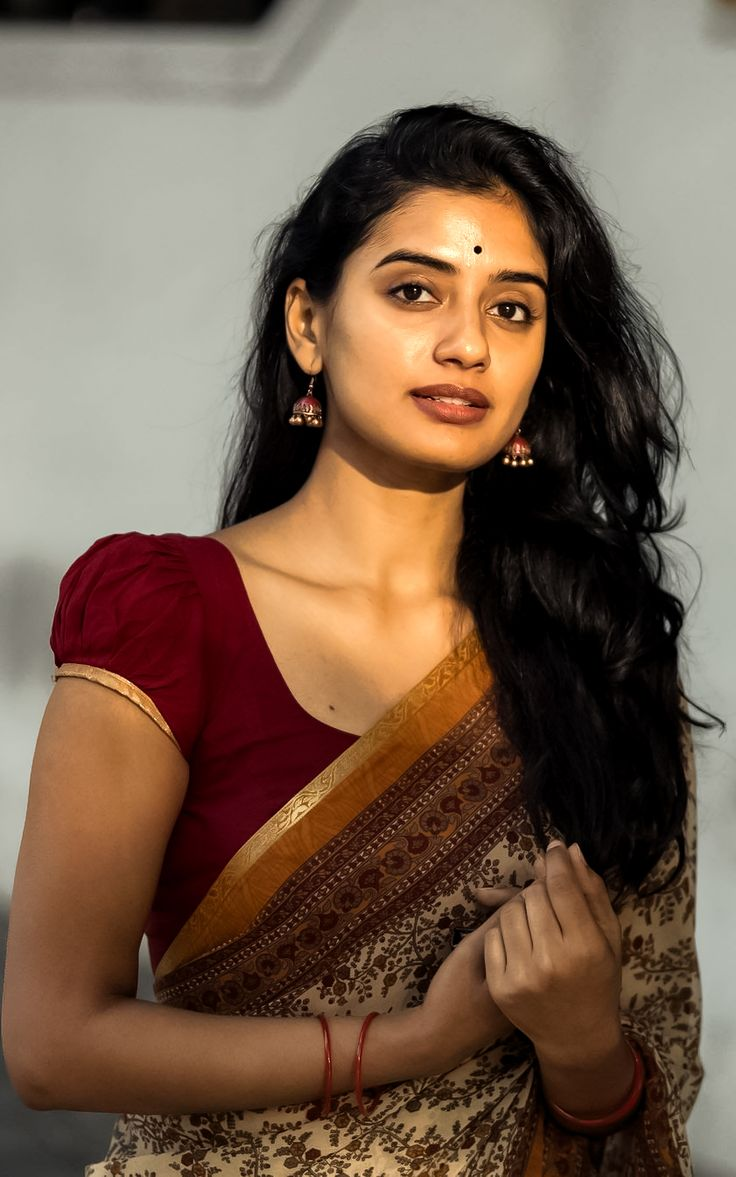
- Sushmitha Bhat in 2026
- Born: Sushmitha Bhat; 17 May 1994 (age 32); Chennai, Tamil Nadu, India
- Education: Electronics and Communication Engineering
- Occupations: Actress; Model; Dancer
- Years active: 2020 – present
- Notable work: Anjali in Kavyanjali; Nanditha in Dominic and the Ladies' Purse; Radha in Krishnavataram Part 1: The Heart

Sushmitha Bhat (born 17 May 1994), is an Indian actress and dancer, worked in the Kannada, Telugu, Malayalam, Tamil, and Hindi industry. She is known for her roles in the serial Kavyanjali, for the film Dominic and the Ladies' Purse and Krishnavataram Part 1: The Heart. She also appeared in the successful music video "Tulasi".

== Early life ==
Sushmitha Bhat was born in Chennai, raised in Udupi and Bengaluru. She graduated with a degree in Electronics and Communication Engineering. She is a formally trained classical dancer, specially Bharatanatyam.

== Career ==
In 2020, Bhat made her television debut as the lead role of "Anjali" in Udaya TV's Kannada serial Kavyanjali, garnering widespread acclaim for her performance.

In 2021, Bhat debuted in Telugu film as a supporting dancer in director Revanth Korukonda's romantic dance centric film Natyam. In 2024, she made her Kannada film debut with Kaljiga, and the romantic comedy Chow Chow Bath, which had a successful theatrical stint.

In 2025, she marked her Malayalam movie debut in Gautham Vasudev Menon's thriller Dominic and the Ladies' Purse, alongside Mammootty; her character "Nanditha" received critical acclaim. Her Tamil film debut was in Love Marriage. She also portrayed the ethereal spirit in Rahul Sadasivan's acclaimed horror film Diés Iraé, alongside Pranav Mohanlal.

In 2026, Bhat gained visibility when she appeared in and co-choreographed the music video for composer Sumedh K.'s independent Kannada single "Tulasi", a contemporary adaptation of Shri Purandara Dasa's kruthi. She made her Hindi film debut as devi "Radha" in Hardik Gajjar's Krishnavataram Part 1: The Heart; the film received positive reviews, and her performance was critically praised. She also has a special role in the Kannada film Karavali, featuring Raj B. Shetty.

Bhat's upcoming projects includes Ra Karthik's Telugu film King 100, alongside Nagarjuna.

== Filmography ==
Key
†	Denotes films that have not yet been released

=== Film ===
Year	Title	Role	Language	Notes	Ref.
2021	Natyam	Vaishnavi	Telugu	Supporting dancer	
2024	Echoes of Love	Swathi	Kannada	Short film	
2024	Kaljiga	Siri	Kannada	Main role	
2024	Chow Chow Bath	Sandhya	Kannada	Main role	
2025	Dominic and the Ladies' Purse	Nanditha	Malayalam	Main role	
2025	Love Marriage	Ambika	Tamil	Main role	
2025	Diés Iraé	Kani	Malayalam	Supporting role	
2026	Krishnavataram Part 1: The Heart (Hridayam)	Radha	Hindi	Lead role	
2026	Karavali	Bhumi	Kannada	Special appearance	
2026	King 100 †		Telugu	Filming	

=== Television ===
Year	Title	Role	Language	Note	Ref.
2020	Kavyanjali	Anjali	Kannada	Lead role	

== Discography ==
=== Music videos appearance ===
Year	Song	Composer	Choreographer(s)	Language	Ref.
2026	"Tulasi"	Sumedh K.	Rashmitha Nair & Sushmitha Bhat	Kannada	
