= Kavyanjali (Kannada TV series) =

Indian Kannada-language soap opera/drama

- Genre: Soap opera; Family drama
- Written by: Vinod Kumar K R, Girish, Sushma
- Directed by: Adarsh Hegde
- Starring: Vidyashree Jayaram; Akshata Deshpande; Sushmitha Bhat; Darshak Gowda; Pavan Ravindra; Deepa Hiremath
- Theme music composer: Dharan, Prakash
- Country of origin: India
- Original language: Kannada
- No. of episodes: 465

Production
- Executive producers: Sathisha M, Suraj Prakash Byrappa
- Producer: Shankar Venkatraman
- Editor: Girish Rai Kadaba
- Camera setup: Multi-camera
- Running time: 20–22 minutes
- Production company: Shaak Studios

Original release
- Network: Udaya TV
- Release: 3 August 2020 – 26 February 2022

Kavyanjali is an Indian Kannada language soap opera aired on Udaya TV from 2020 to 2022. The show stars Vidyashree Jayaram, Akshata Deshpande, Darshak Gowda and Pavan Ravindra as the main leads. Kavyanjali was considered unique for not only the romantic chemistry between the leads but also their friendship and the story's main plot.

== Plot ==
The plot revolves around between two cousins, Kavya and Anjali, who consider themselves sisters. Kavya is selfless, caring, immature, and angry, meanwhile, Anjali is caring and mature. Kavya is in a relationship with Sushanth, but she dominates and controls him. Sushanth slowly realises the difference between obsession and true love after becoming close to Anjali and falling in love with her. After Anjali's parents die, Sushanth likes her even more.

On Kavya and Sushanth's wedding day, Kavya learns of Sushanth's love for Anjali. She sacrifices her happiness for Sushanth and makes Sushanth and Anjali marry despite Anjali's displeasure. On the same day, Kavya is forced to marry Siddharth, Sushanth's brother, causing Kavya's mother to hate Anjali. Sushanth's mother, Vedha, hates Anjali because of past bitterness but likes her now and considers her as one of her daughters and supports her.

Anjali and Sushanth, and Kavya and Siddharth discover their love for each other with the help of Vasu and Rishi. Kavya learns of Akshata, Siddharth's ex-lover, and decides to reunite them. Without telling him her plan, she travels to Goa with Siddharth to meet Akshatha. Siddharth, who knows Kavya's intentions, becomes angry with her and leaves her. Kavya injures herself by falling down the stairs while running after him. He feels guilty about her condition and cares for her. She forces him to reunite with Akshatha but he tells Akshatha he is not ready to reconcile. He returns with Kavya to Bangalore. Siddharth pleads with her never to mention Akshatha again, and she accepts. Soon he realizes that he does have romantic feelings for Kavya. He tries to tell her multiple times but fails. Finally, he writes a letter explaining his feelings for her and gives her a gift.

Later, Anjali discovers that Sushanth is not Veda's son. She plans a surprise for Sushanth, and expresses her feelings for him. Siddharth proposes to Kavya in front of his family, and both accept each other, ready to start their life anew. Anjali is threatened by Kailash and cannot open up about her feelings for him. She says she will leave the house, despite this sentiment making Sushanth depressed. When Anjali leaves the house, Vedha realises something is happening and goes to meet her at the airport. Anjali is shot by someone Kailash had hired, although not fatally.

Kavya breaks ties with her mother as she had mistreated Anjali. Kailash conspires to kill Anjali, but Siddharth saves her from his hired thugs. A snake later bites Anjali. Siddharth is suspicious, and both brothers try to uncover the truth. Kailash tries to plot against Sushanth and reveal his true parentage.

Siddharth misunderstands that he was adopted and decides to leave with Kavya. Kavya already knows that Sushanth was adopted, but she hides the truth from Siddarth for Sushanth's sake. Anjali reveals to Siddharth that Sushanth is the adopted one. Later, a conspiracy is hatched by Prema and Ajji. Sushanth discovers that he was adopted and is devastated, but he understands Vedha's situation.

Meanwhile, Anjali becomes pregnant. Prema tries to kill her unborn baby, but Vasu protects Anjali. Kavya's father discloses all of Prema and Ajji's schemes to the family. Ajji confesses that Kailash is Sushanth's father, and he cheated on her with Triveni (Sushanth's biological mother). Kailash seeks forgiveness from Vedha for all his misdeeds. Prema and Ajji realise their mistake, and Prema accepts Anjali as her daughter.

A year later, Kavya and Anjali are with their babies, and all family members gather in celebratory a mood. Kavya announces her son's name as Kavyartha, and Anjali reveals her daughter's name as Sushanjali. Everyone is pleased and celebrates.

== Cast ==
=== Main ===
- Vidyashree Jayaram as Kavya Siddarth Arus: Anjali's cousin and Siddharth's wife, Sushanth's former love interest and fiancée, Kavyartha's mother
- Sushmitha Bhat / Deepa Hiremath / Akshata Deshpande as Anjali Sushanth Arus: Kavya's cousin, Sushanth's wife, Sushanjali's mother
- Darshak Gowda as Siddharth Arus: Kavya's husband, Vedha's elder son, Rishi's elder and Sushanth's elder step-brother, Kavyartha's father
- Pavan Ravindra as Sushanth Arus: Kavya's former love interest and fiancée, Anjali's husband, Vedha's foster son and Triveni's biological son, Siddharth and Rishi's step-brother, Sushanjali's father

=== Supporting ===
- Abhinaya as Vedha Arus: Siddharth and Rishi's mother, Sushanth's foster mother
- Sinchana Ponnava / Sahana Annappa as Punarvasu (Vasu): Kailash's sister. She supports Anjali.
- Mithun Tejasvi as Kailash Arus: Siddharth, Sushanth and Rishi's father
- Vinya as Rishi: Siddharth's sister and Sushanth's foster sister, Vedha's daughter
- Mareena Thara as Prema: Kavya's mother. She dislikes Anjali
- Tennis Krishna as Govindanna, Vasu's friend whom Sushanjali and Sidka met in Goa
- Vishwas Bharadwaj as Karthik
- Mahalakshmi Urs as Anjali's mother
- Ravi Bhat as Anjali's father

=== Appearances ===
- Mandya Ramesh as Thatha, Triveni's relative
- Arthana as Triveni
- Pavithra Naik as Kadambari
- Malathi Saradeshpande as Gayathri

== Crossover and special episodes ==
- From 7 September 2020 to 11 September 2020 and from 6 May 2021 to 26 May 2021 it had a Mahasangama with Manasaare.
- From 9 November 2020 to 13 November 2020 it aired a one-hour special episode.
- Again from 14 April 2021 to 17 April 2021 it had a crossover with Manasaare for Yuva and Prathana marriage episodes.

== Adaptations ==
Language	Title	Original release	Network(s)	Last aired	Notes	Ref.
Kannada	Kavyanjali ಕಾವ್ಯಾಂಜಲಿ	3 August 2020	Udaya TV	26 February 2022	Original	
Bengali	Mom Palak মা পলক	26 April 2021	Sun Bangla	27 March 2022	Remake	
Malayalam	Manassinakkare മനസ്സിനക്കരെ	23 August 2021	Surya TV	26 November 2022	Remake	
Telugu	Kavyanjali కావ్యాంజలి	23 August 2021	Gemini TV	14 January 2023	Remake	

== Reception ==
The series received a positive response from viewers during its run. The Times of India reported in December 2020 that Kavyanjali had been receiving a good response from viewers after reaching 100 episodes. The series subsequently completed 400 episodes in November 2021, with the cast and crew celebrating the milestone. Bangalore Times later described the show's audience reception as having been strong, noting that viewers had "lapped up" the series.
