= Kasturi Nivasa (TV series) =

Indian Kannada-language soap opera

- Genre: Soap opera
- Screenplay by: Sri Harsha C A, Geervani Bhat
- Story by: Dialogues: Chaitrika Hegde
- Directed by: Mussanje Mahesh
- Starring: Risha Nijaguna; Dileep Shetty
- Country of origin: India
- Original language: Kannada
- No. of seasons: 1
- No. of episodes: 833

Production
- Producers: Jayashree Raj; Rakesh Chandru
- Camera setup: Multi-camera
- Running time: 20–23 minutes
- Production company: Devi Studios Pvt Ltd

Original release
- Network: Udaya TV
- Release: 9 September 2019 – 13 August 2022

Kasthuri Nivasa (transl. Kasthuri's House) was an Indian Kannada soap opera which premiered on 9 September 2019 and ended on 13 August 2022 in Udaya TV starring Risha Nijaguna and Dileep Shetty in lead roles.

== Plot ==
Parvathi and Mahanadhi's youngest son Raghav marries Mridula, his estranged aunt Kasthuri's daughter. In a cruel twist of fate Mridula's sudden death plunges Raghav into desolation. Unaware of his conniving sister Sarvamangala, can Raghav infuse joy back into Kasturi Nivasa when Kushi enters his life like a breath of fresh airless is what the story unfolds.

== Cast ==
=== Main ===
- Varsha / Amrutha Ramamoorthy as Mridula Raghav (Dead)
- Risha Nijaguna as Kushi Raghav
- Dileep Shetty as Raghav Mahanadi

=== Supporting ===
- Asha Rani as Parvathi Mahanadi
- Sitara as Sarvamangala Gopinath
- Jyothi Rai / Nandini Gowda as Kasthuri
- Rakesh Chandru as Vasishta
- Rajgopal Joshi as Mahanadi
- Shilpa Iyer / Varshitha Seni / Sangeetha Narayan as Nagaveni Madhav
- Ruthu Sai as Sathyabhama Keshav
- Suved Das as Abhay Gopinath
- Sourav / Viyan Shikhar as Madhav Mahanadi
- Padma Vasanthi as Lakkima
- Jyothi as Dr. Jayamma
- Jai Jagadish as Uday Narayan

=== Cameo appearances ===
- Ajay Rao as himself
- Sudha Rani as herself (Mahasangama with Sevanthi)
- Srinivasa Murthy as Brahmachari
- Amrutha Ramamoorthy as Mridula Raghav
- Jayashree Raj as Durga

== Crossover and Special episodes ==
- It aired a one-hour special episode from 13 January 2020 to 18 January 2020 and from 22 February 2021 to 1 March 2021.
- From 7 September 2020 to 11 September 2020 and from 2 November 2020 to 8 November 2020 it had a Mahasangama with Sevanthi.
- It had a one-hour episode aired on 1 August 2021.

== Adaptations ==
Language	Title	Original release	Network(s)	Last aired	Notes
Kannada	Kasthuri Nivasa ಕಸ್ತೂರಿ ನಿವಾಸ	9 September 2019	Udaya TV	13 August 2022	Original
Tamil	Aruvi அருவி	18 October 2021	Sun TV	11 May 2024	Remake
