= Kanyakumari (TV series) =

Indian television drama

- Genre: Drama
- Screenplay by: raghucharan Tiptur
- Directed by: Preethu Raju Haladahalli
- Starring: Asiya Firdose; Yashwanth; Rashmitha J.Shetty
- Composer: Hamsalekha
- Country of origin: India
- Original language: Kannada
- No. of episodes: 325

Production
- Producers: Raghucharan Tiptur & Preethu Raju Haladahalli
- Production location: Bengaluru
- Cinematography: Nagraj Hodlur Shirol; Guruprasad Yelekoppa
- Editor: Manu
- Camera setup: Multi-camera
- Running time: 22 minutes
- Production companies: Rajashri Campus & Drupas pictures

Original release
- Network: Colors Kannada
- Release: 9 August 2021 – 23 September 2022

Kanyakumari is an Indian television drama in the Kannada language that premiered on Colors Kannada on 9 August 2021 and ended on 23 September 2022 with 325 episodes. It stars Asiya Firdose, Yashwanth and Rashmitha J. Shetty in the lead roles.

== Plot summary ==
The sprightly and simple Kannika, born into an affluent family, has a Divine Power that she is unaware of. Her heart has no want for riches and she falls in love with Charan, a cab driver from a slum she often visits. Life takes a big turn for the couple when Yamini comes in search of the divine power to take for her own. The story goes on to show how Charan and Kannika fight back Yamini

== Cast ==
=== Main ===
- Asiya Firdose as Kannika Aras; Daughter of Shekhar Aras and Kalpana Aras and Charan's love interest
- Yashwanth as Charan; Cab driver and Kannika's love interest
- Rashmitha J.Shetty as Yaamini

=== Recurring ===
- Swathi as Kalpana Aras, Shekar Aras's wife and Kannika and Dhruva's mother
- Preetham M.N. as Shekhar Aras; Kalpana Aras's husband and Kannika and Dhruva's father
- Nakul Sharma as Dhruva Aras; Kalpana and Shekhar's son and Kannika's brother and Aishu's husband
- Binny Joseph as Lakshmi
- Yamuna Srinidhi as Dhanalakshmi; Charan's mother
- Rishika as Aishwarya "Aishu"; Charan's younger sister
- Sahana Annappa as Bhagya Lakshmi; Charan's elder sister
- Saanvi as Bhagyalakshmi's daughter
- Harsharjun as Ranganath; Bhagyalaksmi's husband
- Yadhunandan as Abhi; Charan's brother
- Dileep K gowda as Shridhar; Charan's friend

== Production ==
The show marks the debut of actors Asiya and Yashwanth as the leads of the show. The show is being shot in and around Bengaluru. Some episodes of the show have been filmed in the outskirts of Bengaluru.The show is directed by Preethu Raju haladahalli and also produced by Raghucharan tiptur & preethu Raju haladahalli

== Soundtrack ==
The title song for the series Kanyakumari has been sung by singer Preethu Bhat. The original music has been given by Hamsalekha.

Kanyakumari Soundtrack:
No.	Title	Lyrics	Singer	Length
1.	"Kanyakumari Title Song"	Raghucharan Tiptur	Preethu Bhat	1:56
Total length:				1:56
