= Vindhuja Vikraman =

Indian television actress

- Born: 27 January 1996 (age 30); Thiruvananthapuram, Kerala, India
- Occupations: Actress; Model
- Years active: 2014–present

Vindhuja Vikraman (born 27 January 1996) is an Indian television actress who appears in Malayalam Tamil and Telugu language soap operas.

== Career ==
Vindhuja was born 27 January 1996 to Vikraman Nair and Bindhu. She has a younger brother. She started her TV career with the comedy show, Back Benchers (2015). After that, she played supporting roles in Parasparam, Kaligandaki and Athmasakhi. In 2017, she played the lead role in soap opera Chandanamazha replacing Meghna Vincent. She then ventured into Tamil language serials through a leading role in Ponnukku Thanga Manasu. She returned to Malayalam through Oridathoru Rajakumari. She is currently playing the lead role in a Telugu Serial Manasantha Nuvve.

== Filmography ==
=== Television ===
•All works are in Malayalam, unless otherwise noted

Year	Title	Role	Channel	Notes	Ref.
2014	Sthreedhanam	Shari	Asianet	1 episode cameo	
2015	Mayamohini	Reema	Mazhavil Manorama		
2015	My Marumakan	—N/a	Surya TV		
2016	Back Benchers	—N/a	Amrita TV		
2016	Parasparam	—N/a	Asianet		
2016	Amruthavarshini		Janam TV		
2017	Kaligandaki	Kotharani	Amrita TV	Debut as lead actress	
2017	Chandanamazha	Amritha Arjun Desai	Asianet	Replac Meghna Vincent	
2017-2018	Athmasakhi	Aparna IPS	Mazhavil Manorama		
2018	Seetha Kalyanam	Fashion show host	Asianet	Cameo Appearance	
2018	Kanmani	Valarmathi	Sun TV	Tamil serial	
2018-2020	Ponnukku Thanga Manasu	Divya Prashanth MLA	Vijay TV	Tamil serial, Replaced Radhika Rao	
2019-2020	Oridathoru Rajakumari	Meenakshi	Surya TV		
2020-2021	Rakkuyil	Shyla	Mazhavil Manorama		
2021 - 2022	Kana Kanmani	Meera Mahadevan	Surya TV		
2022	Manassinakkare	Meera Mahadevan	Surya TV	Cross-over episodes with Kana Kanmani	
2022	Bhavana	Meera Mahadevan	Surya TV	Cameo in promo	
2022–present	Manasantha Nuvve	Sindhu	ETV	Telugu serial	
2023	Kumkumacheppu	Sharika	Flowers TV		

==== Special appearances ====
Year	Title	Role	Channel	Language	Notes	Ref.
2017	Annies Kitchen	Herself	Amrita TV	Malayalam		
2017	Comedy stars (Season 2)	Herself	Asianet	Malayalam	Along with Meghna Vincent	
2018	Onnum Onnum Moonu	Herself	Mazhavil Manorama	Malayalam		
2019	My Favourites	Herself	Janam TV	Malayalam		
2021	Onamamangam	Herself	Surya TV	Malayalam		
2022	Nattu Midukki	Meera	Surya TV	Malayalam		

=== Films & Music videos ===
•All films and music videos are in Malayalam, unless otherwise noted

Year	Title	Role	Notes
2014	Nizhalum Nilavum		Debut Album
2017	Chithramayi		Album
2017	Sarvopari Palakkaran		Debut film
2017	Laali Laali Aararo		Tamil Album
2017	Penmalar		Short film
2019	Appuvinte Sathyaneshwanam	Sindhu	
2020	Karmugil		Album
