= Kaligandaki (TV series) =

- Genre: Thriller
- Written by: P F Mathews, N.P Sajeesh
- Directed by: Madhupal
- Starring: Madupal; Krishna Balakrishna; Abhilash Vijay; Arjun; Kiran; Neeraja; Jaya Geetha; Dhanya Mery Varghese; V K Baiju; Vindhuja Vikraman
- Country of origin: India
- Original language: Malayalam

Production
- Producer: Inspire Global Media
- Camera setup: Multi Camera
- Running time: 22 Minutes

Kaligandaki is an Indian Malayalam-language television mega thriller drama series. The show premiered on general entertainment channel Amrita TV from13 February 2017 from 08:00 to 08:30 pm IST (Monday–Friday) . Prominent Malayalam television film actors Madhupal, Dhanya Mary Varghese, Kiran Aravind, Aravind Mohan, V.K.Baiju, Krishnan Balakrishnan, Neeraja Das, Vindhuja Vikraman appeared in the lead roles of the TV series.

== Plot ==
The plot focuses on a beautiful girl named Ramunni, who is fond of paintings. Ramunni is given a job as a caretaker of a building that houses old paintings. One day she is found murdered and the police try to find out her murderer, which forms the rest of the story.

== Cast ==
- Madhupal
- Dhanya Mery Varghese
- Kiran Aravind
- Neeraja Das
- Vindhuja Vikraman
- Aravind Mohan
- Krishnan Balakrishnan as Guard Nakulan
- V.K Baiju
- Abhilash Vijay as Driver Shekharan

== Awards and reception ==
26th Kerala State Television Awards (2017)

Kaligandaki was nominated and won 7 out of 28 awards of the Kerala State Television Awards, an award given by the Government of Kerala for best tv series and shows.

The detailed award breakdown is as given below:-

Best Director : Madhupal

Best Story writer : G.R Indugopan

Best Cameraman : Noushad Shereef

Best music director : Kallara Gopan

Best Actor: Krishnan Balakrishnan

Best art director : Ajith Krishnan

Best male dubbing artist : R.Radhakrishnan
