= Natyam =

2021 film by Revanth Korukonda

- Directed by: Revanth Korukonda
- Written by: Revanth Korukonda
- Produced by: Sandhya Raju
- Starring: Sandhya Raju
- Cinematography: Revanth Korukonda
- Edited by: Revanth Korukonda
- Music by: Shravan Bharadwaj
- Production company: Nishrinkala Films
- Distributed by: Sri Venkateswara Creations
- Release date: 22 October 2021
- Country: India
- Language: Telugu

Natyam (lit. 'Dance') is a 2021 Indian Telugu-language dance romantic drama film written, directed, filmed and edited by Revanth Korukonda. The film is produced by Sandhya Raju who also plays the lead role in addition to working as the choreographer and costume designer.

The film was released theatrically on 22 October 2021. It was screened at 52nd International Film Festival of India in 'Indian Panorama' section's feature film category in November 2021. The film won two awards at the 68th National Film Awards - Best Choreography for Raju, and Best Make-up Artist for TV Rambabu.

== Plot ==
Natyam is a village that is renowned for Indian classical music and is home to several traditional dance schools. According to legend, British colonial authorities led by Lord Francis tried to destroy these arts but the goddess in the nearby temple intervened, killing British soldiers in a rage and then being pacified by a devotee and redocumenting the knowledge in a book she gave him. As a girl, Sitara tires of her studies and instead becomes interested in dance. At a dance school, she is told the story of Kadhambari by the guru there, who found it in a diary left in Francis' antique car. The story spurs her to learn dance and become a part of his school. However, the guru's wife, who was planning to perform the story, dies soon after, and a rumour is spread that the story is cursed.

Twenty years later, Sitara has become a renowned dancer herself. Meanwhile, Rohit comes from Hyderabad looking for a new idea for his team to enter a dance competition in America. Seeing her dance in the temple, he is stunned and continually follows and irritates Sitara. He eventually joins her dance school, but despite his enthusiasm he seemingly doesn't pick up any skills. A month later, Sitara gets to perform with Hari Babu, the school's pre-eminent male dancer. However, the MLA-cum-temple owner asks his son, who had earlier harassed Sitara to ruin the performance, to make sure "someone dies". Rohit also showcases his dancing skills by rehearsing with Sitara, surprising everyone. They get distracted and accidentally kiss, which the MLA's son uses to spark a riot, forcing Rohit to take Sitara with him to Hyderabad. Sitara meets his dance troupe and, while initially repulsed by the Western hip hop dances they perform and deeply homesick, she eventually assimilates with them and suggests they use Kadhambari's story for their competition. They gain a spot, but Hari, jealous of Sitara's success, purposely moves the temple dance show to the same date as her flight and guilt-trips her into going to gain forgiveness from her guru. She goes despite Rohit, his friends and her mother's protests, but Hari reveals his true intentions to shame her and rile up the crowd to again drive her out without being able to attend the competition. However, Rohit and the troupe intervene and stage a performance of Kadhambari.

Kadhambari was a renowned classical dancer until the British prohibited the art. While practicing in secret, she was confronted by Lord Francis. She stood up to him and defended Indian dance, leading to Francis falling in love with her. It turns out that the books and the literature were not written by the goddess. They were written by Kaadhambari herself. They went to England but came back to the village so they could be married in the temple, which is where the literature on dance is hidden. The British come after Kadhambari, and in the end Francis is forced to kill her to save the literature. It turns out that after the guru discovered the story of Kadhambari, the MLA told him to keep it a secret as the goddess legend attracted believers to the temple, and had engineered the guru's wife's death to silence it. The crowd is in awe with the story and they hail Sitara's performance. Finally, Sitara and her guru reconcile and the troupe prepares to leave for America.

== Cast ==
- Sandhya Raju as Sitara, a Kuchipudi dancer / Kadhambari
  - Baby Devina as young Sitara
- Kamal Kamaraju as Hari Babu
- Adithya Menon as guru of Sitara; father of Hari Babu
- Rohit Behal as Rohit / Lord Francis
- Bhanupriya as Sitara's mother
- Subhalekha Sudhakar
- Hyper Aadi as CD Shop Owner
- Nagineedu
- Sushmitha Bhat as Vaishnavi, a supporting dancer.
- Rukmini Vijayakumar in a cameo appearance

== Production ==
Natyam marks the Telugu film debut of Sandhya Raju, a Kuchipudi dancer and daughter-in-law of industrialist Ramalinga Raju. Kamal Kamaraju was cast in the film while he was filming for Maharshi (2019). He was a part of nine-month Kuchipudi training. About his work for filming a song of the film in the Lepakshi Temple, Andhra Pradesh, he said that “After a lot of effort, permissions were granted to film inside the temple, but we had to do it during the day. Dancing bare feet on the stone surface in the 40-degree summer heat and modifying their footwork to suit the ups and downs of the temple sapped all their energy and their feet needed soothing balms when the heat took a toll. We pushed ourselves". The film was shot at Lepakshi Temple (Andhra Pradesh), Hampi (Karnataka) and Hyderabad (Telangana). Raju plays the character of Sitara, a dancer who wishes to remove superstitious and beliefs by performing the story of Kadambari.

== Soundtrack ==
Natyam

Soundtrack album by Shravan Bharadwaj
- Recorded: 2020–2021
- Genre: Feature film soundtrack
- Language: Telugu
- Label: Lahari Music
- Producer: Shravan Bharadwaj

All music is composed by Shravan Bharadwaj.

Track listing
No.	Title	Lyrics	Singer(s)	Length
1.	"Namah Shivaya" (Lyrics took from Ardhanareeswara Stotram)	Jagadhguru Sri Aadhi Shankaracharya	Kaala Bhairava and Lalitha Kavya	5:30
2.	"Poni Poni"	Karunakar Adigarla	Lalitha Kavya	3:49
3.	"Thoorpu Padamara"	Karunakar Adigarla	Chinmayi Sripada	4:30
4.	"Venuvulo"	Karunakar Adigarla	Anurag Kulkarni	4:20

== Reception ==
Sangeetha Devi Dundoo of The Hindu opined that "The dance is good, but the film needed a better script". She further stated: "Natyam is an interesting and brave attempt, but required a better script to make it the compelling drama that it could have been". Writing for The New Indian Express, Murali Krishna CH felt that Natyam isn't a bad film, but it's not a good film either. It's the kind of film that keeps you waiting for something to happen, but nothing ever does. In contrast, Thadhagath Pathi felt that the film is a refreshing dance drama and gave a rating of 3 out of 5. He wrote that "Natyam does not just manage to put forth the art form but it also digs deep into history to narrate the tale in an engaging manner."

== Accolades ==
Award (Note: Awards, festivals and organizations are in alphabetical order.)	Date of ceremony (Note: Date is linked to the article about the awards held that year, wherever possible.)	Category	Recipient(s)	Result	Ref.
National Film Awards	2022	Best Choreography	Sandhya Raju	Won	
National Film Awards	2022	Best Make-up Artist	T V Rambabu	Won	
