= Jennifer Antony =

Indian actress and model

- Occupations: Actress, Model, Painter
- Years active: 1992–present

Jennifer Antony is an Indian actress and model. She took part in the beauty pageant contest Miss Bangalore and won it in 1992, gained popularity and entered into the Kannada and Malayalam film industry. She is also a professional painter.

== Filmography ==
Key
| † | Denotes films that have not yet been released |

| Year | Title | Role | Language | Notes |
|---|---|---|---|---|
| 2013 | 10:30 am Local Call | Showroom Manager | Malayalam | |
| 2015 | Salt Mango Tree | Vice Principal | Malayalam | |
| 2015 | Bhaskar the Rascal | Jennifer | Malayalam | |
| 2015 | Pathemari | Girija | Malayalam | |
| 2015 | Nee-Na | Hemambika | Malayalam | |
| 2015 | Alone | Dr. Sunanda | Kannada | |
| 2015 | Waiting | Nalini | Hindi | |
| 2016 | Karaioram | Dr. Sunanda | Tamil | |
| 2016 | Fukri | Sunitha | Malayalam | |
| 2016 | Moondraam Ullaga Por | Saravanan's mother | Tamil | |
| 2016 | Punchirikku Parasparam | Woman putting makeup | Malayalam | Short film |
| 2016 | Marubhoomiyile Aana | Deepa | Malayalam | |
| 2016 | Kasaba | Pavizham | Malayalam | |
| 2016 | Puthiya Niyamam | Kshemettathi | Malayalam | |
| 2017 | Raajakumara | | Kannada | |
| 2017 | Onpatham Valavinapuram | Gangamma | Malayalam | |
| 2017 | Nuggekayi | | Kannada | |
| 2017 | Oru Cinemakkaran | Lakshmi | Malayalam | |
| 2017 | Katha Vichitra | | Kannada | |
| 2017 | Chamak | | Kannada | |
| 2017 | Satya Harishchandra | | Kannada | |
| 2017 | Puthan Panam | Shenoy's wife | Malayalam | |
| 2018 | Orange | | Kannada | |
| 2018 | Bindaas Googly | | Kannada | |
| 2018 | Asathoma Sadgamaya | | Kannada | |
| 2018 | Bhaskar Oru Rascal | Sanjay's mother | Tamil | |
| 2018 | Parole | Alex's sister | Malayalam | |
| 2018 | Uncle | K.K's friend | Malayalam | |
| 2019 | Seetharama Kalyana | | Kannada | |
| 2019 | Oronnonnara Pranayakadha | Subaida | Malayalam | |
| 2019 | Kaaviyyan | Swetha | Tamil | |
| 2020 | Al Mallu | Jalaja | Malayalam | |
| 2021 | Erida | Secretary wife | Malayalam/Tamil | Bilingual film |
| 2021 | Yuvarathnaa | | Kannada | |
| 2022 | Twenty One Hours | Uma | Kannada | |
| 2023 | Raghavendra Stores | | Kannada | |

=== TV series ===
| Year | Title | Role | Channel | Language |
|---|---|---|---|---|
| 2014 – 2016 | Swathi Muthu | | Star Suvarna | Kannada |
| 2014 | Pasamalar | Bhuvaneswari | Sun TV | Tamil |
| 2016 | Gandhari | | | Kannada |
| 2016 | Myna | | | Kannada |
| 2018 – 2019 | Bharya | Gandhari Amma | Asianet | Malayalam |
| 2018 – 2020 | Ponnukku Thanga Manasu | Shanthi Sukumaran | Star Vijay | Tamil |
| 2020 – 2021 | Naagini 2 | Damayanti | Zee Kannada | Kannada |
| 2021 – 2022 | Manassinakkare | Suhasini | Surya TV | Malayalam |
| 2023 – 2024 | Ninnishtam Ennishtam | Producer | Surya TV | Malayalam |
| 2024 | Gouri Shankaram | Radhamani Thankachi | Asianet | Malayalam |
| 2026 | Krishnagadha | Kalimadham Bhairavi | Zee Keralam | Malayalam |
