= Cheriya Kallanum Valiya Policeum =

- Directed by: Haridas Kesavan
- Produced by: Anand Kumar
- Starring: Mukesh; Jagadeesh; Suraj Venjaramood; Dhanya Mary Varghese
- Cinematography: Anandakuttan
- Music by: Thej
- Release date: 27 February 2010
- Country: India
- Language: Malayalam

Cheriya Kallanum Valiya Policeum is a 2010 Malayalam-language film directed by Haridas Kesavan. The film stars Mukesh, Jagadish, Suraj Venjaramoodu, and Dhanya Mary Varghese.

== Plot ==
This film tells the story of a mysterious man Sadasivan, who walks into a house in a village called Pancharakkara, knowing that the man of the house, Kumaran, has committed suicide. Soon he becomes dear to everyone around, and is a big help to Kumaran's widow Soumini who has been left adrift after her husband's demise.

The Panchayat President sneaks around with ulterior motives in mind at midnight. The local tea shop owner, the tailor and the drunkard are also involved. The story goes on to show Kumaran return one afternoon and the people of the town see him and celebrate. He then reveals to his wife what actually happened when she mentions to him about Sadasivan who stayed through the difficult time. He tells her that Sadasivan is actually his childhood friend who he bumped into one day before his disappearance, and confided in him about their worsening financial situation. Sadasivan offered a way out—he told Kumaran to invest a large sum of money in the company where he was employed, claiming it would solve his financial problems. He also promised Kumaran a job in the same company. Trusting his friend, Kumaran borrowed ₹10 lakhs from a moneylender, despite already being in debt and handed over the money directly to Sadasivan's boss.

However, the next day, Kumaran discovered that the company was a sham. Sadasivan had disappeared, and he couldn't contact him. Devastated by the betrayal, burdened by debt, and unable to face his wife, Kumaran decided to end his life. He wrote a suicide letter and posted it to Soumini. But just as he was about to go through with it, someone knocked on his door—a mysterious figure who helped him find the strength to carry on.

After recounting all this to Soumini, Kumaran sets out to confront Sadasivan. But when they finally meet, Kumaran learns that Sadasivan himself has been tricked by the fraudulent company. Realizing his friend's plight, Sadasivan had traveled to Kumaran's village, repaid the moneylender on his behalf and had been trying to make things right. The two friends then join forces to track down the real culprits behind the scam. In a climactic sequence, they confront the fraudsters, bring them to justice, and hand them over to the police.

== Cast ==
- Mukesh as Sadasivan
- Jagadish as Kattiparambil Kumaran Nair
- Suraj Venjaramoodu as CI Simon Sebastian
- Salim Kumar as Gopalan
- Vidhya as Soumini
- Usha as Padmini
- Dhanya Mary Varghese as Sumi
- Kochu Preman as Kuttappan
- Jagathy Sreekumar
- Mala Aravindan
- Indrans
- Kozhikode Narayanan Nair as Kattiparambal Govindan Nair, Kumaran's father
- Ponnamma Babu
- Charle as Kurukkuvatti Duraichamy
- Geetha Salim
- Rajendran
- Machan Varghese as Police
- Anil Murali
- Sreejith Ravi
