= Ninnu Kori (TV series) =

Indian Telugu–language romantic drama series

- Genre: Drama
- Based on: Geet – Hui Sabse Parayi by Gul Khan
- Written by: Srinivas
- Directed by: Ravi Nagpuri
- Creative director: Nandhana Nadella
- Starring: Akshata Deshpande; Shivakumar Marihal; Harshith Shetty; Sibbu Suryan; Mukhtar Khan; Umashankar Marripati
- Opening theme: Ninnu Kori
- Country of origin: India
- Original language: Telugu
- No. of episodes: 733

Production
- Producers: Nadella Padmini; Nadella Nandhana
- Cinematography: Parandham; Durga Prasad
- Editor: Harikrishna
- Production company: Nadendlas Creations Pvt. Ltd.

Original release
- Network: Star Maa
- Release: 3 June 2024 – 10 October 2026

Ninnu Kori is an Indian Telugu-language television drama series that premiered on Star Maa from 3 June 2024 to 10 October 2026. The series stars Akshata Deshpande, Shivakumar Marihal and Sibbu Suryan in principal roles. It is an official remake of Star One's Hindi series, Geet – Hui Sabse Parayi.

== Plot ==
The series centers on Chandrakala, a young woman from a traditional village family. Her life changes after she becomes involved in a marriage involving an NRI groom. The story follows the conflicts that arise from the marriage and the consequences of deception and hidden circumstances within the family.

== Cast ==
- Akshata Deshpande
- Shivakumar Marihal
- Sibbu Suryan
- Harshith Shetty
- Mukhtar Khan
- Umashankar Marripati
- Mounica

== Production and broadcast ==
Ninnu Kori premiered on Star Maa on 3 June 2024. It was initially scheduled to broadcast at 12:30 p.m. The series has also been covered by Telugu-language entertainment media through reports concerning developments in its storyline and its cast. Harshith Shetty joined the cast of the series in August 2025.
