= Dhanya Mary Varghese =

Indian actress

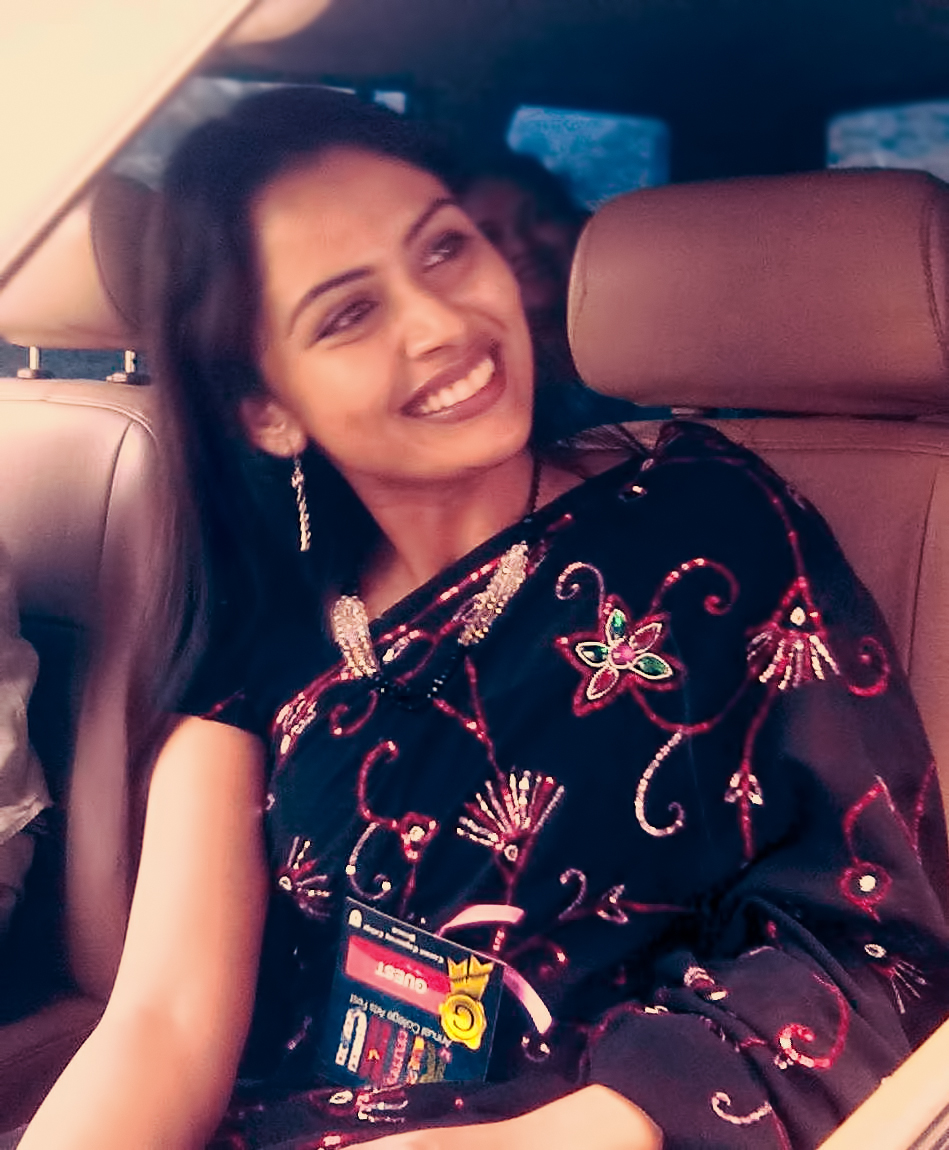
- Varghese in 2011
- Born: Koothattukulam, Muvattupuzha, Kerala, India
- Occupations: Actress; model
- Years active: 2003–present
- Spouse: John Jacob (m. 2012)
- Children: 1

Dhanya Mary Varghese is an Indian actress known for her work in Malayalam cinema and television. Her notable television appearances include Deivathinte Swantham Devootty, Seetha Kalyanam (TV series) and Bigg Boss (Malayalam season 4).

== Early life and education ==
Dhanya was born to Varghese and Sheeba at Edayar, Koothattukulam near Muvattupuzha, Kerala, India. She has a younger brother Dixon Paul Varghese, who is a Station Master in Southern Railway. She completed schooling at Little Flower Girls High School, Vadakara, St. Joseph's Higher secondary school, Piravom and M.K.M. Higher Secondary School, Piravom. She is the product of famous institution Kalabhavan. She pursued bachelors and post graduation from St. Teresa's College in Kochi.

== Career ==
She started her career as a junior artist, She was one of the group dancers in the song Thottuvilichalo. in the movie Swapnam Kondu Thulabharam.She made her acting debut in the Tamil film Thirudi (2006) and later debuted in Malayalam through Nanma directed by Sharath Chandran Vayanad. She rose to prominence through her role in Thalappavu. She later acted in several Malayalam films such as Vairam: Fight For Justice, Kerala Cafe and Nayakan. She was one of the anchors in "Vanitha Asianet-Film awards 2009". She appeared on several Malayalam musical albums. She appeared as a guest judge in the 2010 season of the music reality-television program Idea Star Singer on Asianet.She was a contestant in Bigg Boss (Malayalam season 4) in 2022, where she made it to the top six finalists until finishing as the fourth runner-up. At the show's grand finale, she received an 'Award for Punctuality'.

== Personal life ==
Dhanya got engaged on 14 November 2011 with John Jacob, Winner of Tharolsavam program in Kairali channel. John and Dhanya got married on 9 January 2012 at Mateer Memorial Church, Trivandrum. After marriage she retired from film industry. The couple had a baby boy named Johan on 13 July 2013.

== Filmography ==
=== Film ===
Year	Film	Role	Language	Notes	Ref
2003	Swapnam Kondu Thulabharam	Dancer	Malayalam	Special appearance	
2006	Aarilara	Lover	Malayalam	Album	
2006	Thirudi	Thamarai	Tamil	Lead Role	
2007	Veeramum Eeramum	Muthuazhagi	Tamil		
2007	Nanma	Thara	Malayalam		
2008	Thalappavu	Saramma	Malayalam	Lead Role	
2009	Vairam: Fight For Justice	Vairamani Sivarajan	Malayalam	Lead Role	
2009	Red Chillies	Lamna Shankar	Malayalam		
2009	Kerala Cafe	Hiranmayi	Malayalam	Segment: Lalitham Hiranmayam	
2010	Drona 2010	Savithri	Malayalam		
2010	Cheriya Kallanum Valiya Policum	Sumi	Malayalam		
2010	Nayakan	Mariya Vincent Karanavar	Malayalam	Lead Role	
2010	3 Char Sau Beas	Indhu	Malayalam		
2010	College Days	Rakhi	Malayalam	Lead Role	
2010	Karayilekku Oru Kadal Dooram	Sathyabhama	Malayalam	Lead Role	
2011	Orma Mathram	Catherine	Malayalam		
2011	Veettilekkulla Vazhi	Gayathri	Malayalam		
2011	Pranayam	Asha	Malayalam		
2012	Ennennum Ormakkay	Abitha	Malayalam		
2020	Ammakkorumma	Mother	Malayalam	Album	
2021	Kaanekkaane	Zarine	Malayalam	Released on SonyLIV	
2025	Moonnam Nombaram	Mother Mary	Malayalam		

=== Television ===
Year	Project	Role	Channel	Notes
2012	Deivathinte Swantham Devootty	Devootty	Mazhavil Manorama	Debut
2017	Kaligandaki	Suhara	Amrita TV	
2018–2021	Seetha Kalyanam	Seetha	Asianet	
2020	Avarodoppam Aliyum Achayanum	Seetha	Asianet	Telefilm
2022	Kanakanmani	Mercy Paul	Surya TV	Guest appearance (Mahasangamam episode)
2022	Manasinakkare	Mercy Paul	Surya TV	Guest appearance (Mahasangamam episode)
2023	Parvathy	Devi Aparna	Zee Keralam	

=== Other shows ===
Year	Title	Role	Channel	Notes
2010	Dhannya Me Vishu	Guest	ACV	
2010	Star Singer	Guest Judge	Asianet	Reality show
2010	Super Jody	Judge	Surya TV	Reality show
2010	Vodafone Comedy Stars	Dancer	Asianet	Reality show
2011	Suryaprabhayil Priya Tharangal	Guest	Surya TV	
2011	The Interview	Guest	Rosebowl	
2011	Suryathejassode Amma	Performer	Surya TV	
2011	Asianet Film Awards	Co-Host	Asianet	
2011-2012	Munch Dance Dance	Judge (Grand finale)	Asianet	Reality show
2013	Dhanyaydoppam	Guest	DD Malayalam	
2014	Onnum Onnum Moonu	Guest	Mazhavil Manorama	Game show
2014	Dhannya Me Easter	Guest	Mazhavil Manorama	
2015	Vanitha	Guest	Mazhavil Manorama	
2015	Uchaneram	Guest	ACV	
2016	Manam Pole Mangalyam	Guest	ACV	
2018	Sell Me the Answer	Participant	Asianet	Game show
2019	Annie's Kitchen	Guest	Amrita TV	
2019	Start Music Aaradhyam Paadum	Participant	Asianet	Game show
2019	Badai Bungalow	Herself	Asianet	
2020	Onnum Onnum Moonu	Guest	Mazhavil Manorama	
2020	Life with Jo - D (Dance Cover)	Dhanya	Multilingual	YouTube Channel
2020	Comedy Stars	Guest	Asianet	
2020	Chunkanu Chackochan	Guest	Asianet	Christmas special show
2020	Christmas Thaaramelam	Herself	Asianet	Christmas special show
2020	Start Music Season 2	Participant	Asianet	Game show
2020	Food Steps	Presenter	Asianet	Social media Live Show
2021	Parayam Nedam	Participant	Amrita TV	
2021	Salt and Pepper	Presenter	Kaumudy TV	Cookery show
2021	Red Carpet	Mentor	Amrita TV	
2021	Start Music Season 3	Participant	Asianet	Game show
2021	Day with a Star	Herself	Kaumudy TV	
2021-2022	Bhayam	Contestant	Zee Keralam	Title Winner
2022	Happy Valentine's Day	Dancer	Asianet	
2022	Asianet Super Challenge	Contestant	Asianet	
2022	Bigg Boss (Malayalam season 4)	Contestant	Asianet	4th Runner-up
2022	Fastest Family First	Participant	Asianet	
2022	Start Music Season 4	Participant	Asianet	
2023	Glam with Mom	Judge	Rosebowl/ACV	
2023	Flowers Oru Kodi	Participant	Flowers	
2024	Star magic	Participant	Flowers	

=== Awards ===
Year	Award	Category	Show	Result
2019	Asianet Television Awards 2019 -Best Star Pair	Best Star Pair with Anoop Krishnan	Seetha Kalyanam	Won
