= Love Marriage (2025 film) =

- Theatrical release poster
- Directed by: Shanmuga Priyan
- Written by: Shanmuga Priyan
- Based on: Ashoka Vanamlo Arjuna Kalyanam (Telugu) by Vidya Sagar Chinta
- Produced by: Dr. Swetha Shri; Sreenidhi Sagar
- Starring: Vikram Prabhu; Sushmitha Bhat; Meenakshi Dinesh
- Cinematography: Madhan Christopher
- Edited by: Barath Vikraman
- Music by: Sean Roldan
- Production companies: Assure Films; Rise East Entertainment
- Distributed by: Sakthi Film Factory
- Release date: 27 June 2025
- Running time: 119 minutes
- Country: India
- Language: Tamil

Love Marriage is a 2025 Indian Tamil-language romantic comedy film written and directed by Shanmuga Priyan in his directorial debut. Produced by Dr. Swetha Shri and Sreenidhi Sagar under the banners Assure Films and Rise East Entertainment respectively, the film stars Vikram Prabhu, Sushmitha Bhat (in her Tamil debut) and Meenakshi Dinesh in the lead roles. The film is a remake of the Telugu film Ashoka Vanamlo Arjuna Kalyanam (2022).

Love Marriage released in theatres on 27 June 2025. The film received average reviews from critics.

== Plot ==
Ramachandran alias Ram is a 33-year-old man from Usilampatti, who is seen as ill-fated in his marriage, as none of the prospective brides have accepted him. As his family is unable to find girls in their community, they get into an alliance with a family in Kolappalur, Gobichettipalayam. He, along with his extended family, travels there for the engagement ceremony with Ambika. After the engagement, Ram is keen to talk to Ambika, but she appears to be shy and less talkative. Ambika's younger sister Radha, who is more talkative in nature, soon bonds with Ram as a sister-in-law. During the pre-wedding shoot, Ram notices that Ambika has tears in her eyes. As Ram's family is about to leave for their town, due to the delay caused by the astrologer, the bus breaks down, which makes them stay for a few more days in the same house.

Further attempts to leave the house get blocked due to the government imposing a lockdown due to the COVID-19 pandemic. During their stay, Ram drops a paper with his mobile number, and Ambika chats with him on WhatsApp, or so he thinks. Ram tries to kiss Ambika, and she slaps him. Ram soon realizes that it is Radha who has been chatting with him all this time and he assumed that it was Ambika. As the elders agree to get them married earlier, Ram says that he needs some time to agree to the wedding. Radha figures out that Ram was slapped by Ambika and tries to patch up the misunderstanding. Radha gets to know that Ambika is in love with Gowtham, Ambika's college senior and their parents have forced her into the engagement. Due to Radha, Ambika talks to Ram and says sorry, but Ram misinterprets that she has accepted the marriage and oblivious that Ambika is in love with another person, Ram agrees to the wedding and informs the elders.

The next day, the family is shocked to learn that Ambika has eloped. Ram's sharp-tongued uncle verbally accuses Ambika of having a questionable character and demands that they leave Ambika's house immediately since the marriage has failed. However, due to COVID restrictions imposed all over India, Ram's family is forced to return to Ambika's house by the local MLA Pournami. An upset Ram gets drunk after his uncle's harsh words, and in his inebriated state, he shouts at his family for creating rifts. Radha consoles the drunk Ram and engages in a conversation with him. Ram questions Radha, pretends to be Ambika over text, and asks if she's interested in him. Radha empathizes with Ram's feelings and starts developing new affection for him. Meanwhile, Ram's pregnant sister Vidhya goes into labor and is admitted to the hospital. Radha helps Ram with travel and other arrangements, and they bond closer. When Ram saves Radha from some mocking youngsters in the village market, he opens up to her about his past love, Sherin, who is now married to someone else. Radha hints at her love for Ram directly.

When Vidhya asks Radha about her marriage, Radha reveals that she needs at least three more years to clear her family's financial debts and fulfill her responsibilities. Radha's father also discovers her feelings for Ram. Ram becomes frustrated with the pressure from his relatives, feeling he can't wait three more years for Radha. When Radha shows him matrimonial photos, a frustrated Ram agrees to marry anyone without looking at the photos. Radha feels hurt and advises Ram to look at the girl next time before rejecting her, suggesting that his heart will come to a halt if he meets the right person. Ram's brother-in-law arrives with permission slips and facilities to take everyone home. Meanwhile, the local police informs Ambika's father about Ambika and Gowtham. Gowtham explains that Ambika left the house due to their decision to defy the caste barrier for their wedding.

Ambika's father takes her back home, where a verbal argument erupts, initiated by Ram's uncle. Ambika's father stands up for Ambika, stating that she is more important to him than any caste or relatives. The argument escalates and Ram's father challenges to marry his son within the next 30 days. However, as they leave Kolappalur, Ram sees Radha and realizes she's the right girl for him. He stops the car and informs his parents that he wants to marry Radha and is willing to wait until she's ready. Initially, Ram's relatives object, but he convinces them that he won't marry just to fulfill societal pressures. Instead, he'll marry the woman he desires and that woman is Radha. Ram individually returns to Radha's house and proposes to her, promising to wait for her as long as she needs. Radha, who loves Ram happily agrees and after three years, they get married with the blessings of their relatives. Additionally, Ambika's love with Gowtham is also accepted.

== Cast ==
- Vikram Prabhu as Ramachandran "Ram"
- Sushmitha Bhat as Ambika, Radha's elder sister
- Meenakshi Dinesh as Radha, Ambika's younger sister
- Ramesh Thilak as Guru
- Aruldoss as Ram's maternal uncle
- Gajaraj as Ram's and Vidhya's father
- Muruganandam as Ambika's and Radha's uncle
- Kodangi Vadivelu as an astrologer
- Winner Ramachandran as Kolappalur Thangavelu, Ambika's and Radha's father
- Yasar as Guru's assistant
- Aarya Lakshmi as Vidhya, Ram's sister
- Sithan KG Mohan as Ram's paternal uncle
- Sathyaraj in a cameo appearance as MLA Pournami
- Rio Raj in a cameo appearance as Gowtham, Ambika's boyfriend

== Production ==
On 13 February 2025, Vikram Prabhu's next venture to be a romantic film, titled Love Marriage was revealed through a first-look poster, directed by debutant Shanmuga Priyan, who had earlier worked as an associate to Anand Shankar and had co-directed Nitham Oru Vaanam (2022). The film is produced by Dr. Swetha Shri and Sreenidhi Sagar under the banners Assure Films and Rise East Entertainment respectively. The film stars Sushmitha Bhat in her Tamil debut alongside Meenakshi Dinesh, Aruldoss, Ramesh Thilak, and others in important roles. Sathyaraj was cast in for a cameo appearance to portray the role of a senior politician. The music for the film is composed by Sean Roldan, while cinematography is handled by Madhan Christopher and editing by Barath Vikraman.

== Music ==
Love Marriage

Soundtrack album by Sean Roldan
- Genre: Feature film soundtrack
- Language: Tamil
- Label: Sony Music
- Producer: Sean Roldan

Sean Roldan chronology
Tourist Family (2025)	Love Marriage (2025)	Revolver Rita (2025)

Singles from Love Marriage
- 1. "Kalyana Kalavaram" Released: 3 April 2025; 2. "Bejaara Aanen" Released: 22 May 2025; 3. "Eduda Bottle" Released: 12 June 2025; 4. "Meendum Pirandheno" Released: 24 June 2025

The film has music composed by Sean Roldan. The first promo single "Kalyana Kalavaram" was released on 3 April 2025. The second video single "Bejaara Aanen" was released on 22 May 2025. The third single "Eduda Bottle" sung by Mysskin was released on 12 June 2025. The fourth video single "Meendum Pirandheno" was released on 24 June 2025.

Track listing
No.	Title	Lyrics	Singer(s)	Length
1.	"Bejaara Aanen"	Mohan Rajan	Sivaangi Krishnakumar	3:39
2.	"Eduda Bottle"	Mohan Rajan	Mysskin	3:25
3.	"Kalyana Kalavaram"	Sean Roldan	Sean Roldan	3:22
4.	"Meendum Pirandheno"	Sean Roldan	Sean Roldan, M. Lalitha Sudha	3:27
5.	"Raasathorai"	Mohan Rajan	Anthony Daasan, Meenakshi Elayaraja	3:23

== Release ==
=== Theatrical ===
Love Marriage released in theatres on 27 June 2025.

== Critical reception ==
Avinash Ramachandran of Cinema Express gave 2.5/5 stars and wrote "[..] Love Marriage is a throwback to the times when people came to the theatres to watch a ‘family padam’ and stayed in their seats till the word ‘Subham’ appeared on the screen with all the characters looking at the camera with a big smile on their faces. And Love Marriage manages to just about deliver it with all its conveniences, contrivances, and chaos... Just like your average marriage". A critic of The Times of India gave 2.5/5 stars and wrote "From the concept of the lockdown and love (marriage) failure songs to the storyline, the film follows a very predictable path. [...] The film is most fun and interesting when it doesn’t take itself too seriously – every other joke lands, there is a meaning to it, and you’re excited to see what’s next." Janani K of India Today gave 2.5/5 stars and wrote "'Love Marriage' is a film that could have become a complete laughter riot given its potential. Nonetheless, it ends up as a predictable family film that reminds you of the early 2000s." Anusha Sundar of OTT Play gave 2.5/5 stars and wrote "Love Marriage is a middling narrative which majorly scores for its neat execution and good performances. It is honest in its making and source material, but lacks in giving anything beyond that."
