= Sevanthi (TV series) =

Indian Kannada-language soap opera

- Genre: Soap opera; Romance
- Created by: Manjunath Mangalapura
- Screenplay by: R G Shekar
- Story by: Gunavathi Production; Dialogues: Venugopal; Vidhyavathi P
- Starring: Dhanya Deepika; Shishir Shastry
- Theme music composer: Karthik Sharma
- Country of origin: India
- Original language: Kannada
- No. of episodes: 2225

Production
- Camera setup: Multi-camera
- Running time: 20–22 minutes
- Production company: Guna Pictures

Original release
- Network: Udaya TV
- Release: 25 February 2019 – 4 July 2026

Related
- Roja

Sevanthi (transl. Daisy) is a 2019 Indian Kannada-language soap opera and romance drama which premiered on Udaya TV from 25 February 2019 Monday to Saturday and ended on July 4, 2026 (Saturday) starring Dhanya Deepika and Prashanth Bharadwaj in lead roles. Due to New serial bhagyavantharu it completed its journey and shifted shambhavi at 10.30 pm

== Cast ==
=== Main ===
- Pallavi Gowda (1-280) / Meghana Kushi (281-349) / Dhanya Deepika (350-2225) as Adv.Sevanthi Arjun / Anuradha Arjun, Pramodhadevi granddaughter, Chandrakant and Shantha's daughter, Arjun's wife and Krishna's mother.
- Shishir Shastry / Prashanth Bharadwaj as Adv.Arjun Prathap Simha, Pramodhadevi grandson, Prathap and Kalpana son, Karna and Aswin brother, Sevanthi's husband, Krishna's father

=== Supporting ===
- Aishwarya Vinay as Priya / Fake Anuradha and wife of Karna
- Sangeetha Anil as Kalpana Prathap Simha
- Abhijit Singh / Vinay Kashyap Simha as Ashwin Prathap Simha
- Siri Raju / Prathiba Gowda / Pooja Lokapur/Shwetha Koglur as Pooja Ashwin
- Bharathi Vishnuvardhan / Ashalatha as Pramoda Devi
- Pavithra Jayaram/ Roopashri as Yashodha Raghava
- Rajesh Gowda as Raghava
- Hamsa as Shantha Chandrakanth
- Girish Vaidyanathan as Prathap Simha
- Manjunath Bhat as Chandrakanth
- Sowmya Rao Nadig / Ruthvi as Sakshi
- Roopa Prabhakar as Rathna
- Krishna Adiga / Unknown as Shanthamurthy
- Unknown / Jyothi as Switzerland

Sharada Devi

- Rohit Rangaswamy as Karna as an elder son of Pratap Simha
- Vidya Raj/Keerthi Venkatesh As Meera and Sonakshi Sakshi's sister and karna's second wife

=== Cameo appearances ===
- Srinagar Kitty as himself
- Shruti as herself
- Priyanka Upendra as herself
- Narayana Swamy as Tippeshi: Priya's supposed father
- Mangala as Nanjavva: Priya's supposed mother

== Crossover and Special episodes ==
- From 7 September 2020 to 11 September 2020 and from 2 November 2020 to 8 November 2020 it had a Mahasangama with Kasthuri Nivasa.

== Adaptations ==
Language	Title	Original release	Network(s)	Last aired	Notes	Ref.
Tamil	Roja ரோஜா	9 April 2018	Sun TV	3 December 2022	Original	
Kannada	Sevanthi ಸೇವಂತಿ	25 February 2019	Udaya TV	4 July 2026	Remake	
Telugu	Roja రోజా	11 March 2019	Gemini TV	27 March 2020	Remake	
Hindi	Sindoor Ki Keemat सिंदूर की कीमत	18 October 2021	Dangal TV	29 April 2023	Remake	
Malayalam	Kaliveedu കളിവീട്	15 November 2021	Surya TV	22 September 2024	Remake	
Bengali	Saathi সাথী	7 February 2022	Sun Bangla	3 August 2024	Remake	
Marathi	Tharala Tar Mag! ठरलं तर मग!	5 December 2022	Star Pravah	Ongoing	Remake	
