= Nethravathi (TV series) =

Indian Kannada-language soap opera

- Genre: Soap opera; Drama
- Directed by: Santhosh Gowda
- Starring: Durgashree; Sunny Mahipal
- Country of origin: India
- Original language: Kannada
- No. of episodes: 683

Production
- Cinematography: Dayakar
- Editor: Gurumurthy
- Camera setup: Multi-camera
- Running time: 20–22 minutes
- Production company: Poornima Production House

Original release
- Network: Udaya TV
- Release: 15 March 2021 – 27 May 2023

Nethravathi was an Indian Kannada language soap opera which premiered on 15 March 2021 and ended on 27 March 2023 in Udaya TV and it is available for worldwide streaming on Sun NXT. The serial stars Durgashree and Sunny Mahipal in lead roles. The serial marks the return of actress Anjali after hiatus of two decades.

== Cast ==
- Durgashree as Nethravathi
- Sunny Mahipal
- Anjali as Bhagirathi, Nethravathi's mother
- Chaitra Rao
