= Thirudi (2006 film) =

- Directed by: K. Shankar
- Written by: K. Shankar; K. Panneerselvam (dialogues)
- Produced by: Mahadevan Ganesh; Usha Venkatramani
- Starring: Kathir; Dhanya Mary Varghese
- Cinematography: D. Shankar
- Edited by: S. Satish
- Music by: Bharani
- Production company: G. V. Films
- Release date: 22 December 2006
- Running time: 135 minutes
- Country: India
- Language: Tamil

Thirudi (transl. Lady thief) is a 2006 Tamil language romance film directed by K. Shankar. The film stars newcomers Kathir and Dhanya Mary Varghese, with Sundar, Marina, Rajeev, Ponmaran, Gunasekhar, Kuyili, Vadivukkarasi, and Sempuli Jagan playing supporting roles. The film was produced by Mahadevan Ganesh and Usha Venkatramani. It had music by Bharani, cinematography by D. Shankar, and editing by S. Satish. The film was released on 22 December 2006.

== Plot ==
The film begins with Aravind (Kathir) waiting for someone and then starting to remember his love life.

Five years ago, the karateka Aravind, who hailed from Chennai, arrived in the village Valliyur to train karate under the guidance of the master Devaram (Rajeev). Devaram wanted his students to focus only on training, but Aravind's friend Ravi (Sundar) spent his time romancing with Thamarai's (Dhanya Mary Varghese) friend Poongavanam (Marina), and Devaram requested his students to not bring him a bad among the villagers. Ravi then turned against Devaram and started to practice Silambam with Devaram's archenemy Ponmaran (Ponmaran). In the meantime, Aravind and the village belle Thamarai fell in love with each other. Thereafter, Aravind left for Chennai. Before leaving, he promised Thamarai that he will come back to marry her. The local don Mani (Gunasekhar), Thamarai's relative, who was in love with Thamarai, wanted to marry her at any cost. The days passed, and Aravind did not return from Chennai. Thamarai's family then made marriage arrangements for her. Thamarai began to feel worried, and she fell sick both mentally and physically. When Aravind returned to Valliyur, he saw Thamarai in the hospital and challenged Mani to marry Thamarai. Thamarai then told Aravind that she will marry Mani, and she begged him to become a karate champion. During a fight between Aravind and Mani, Thamarai intervened to save Aravind and accidentally killed Mani.

Back to the present, Thamarai is released from jail and returns to her village. Ravi and Poongavanam are now a happily married couple. The film ends with the reunion of the lovers.

== Cast ==
- Kathir as Aravind
- Dhanya Mary Varghese as Thamarai (Voice dubbed by Renuka)
- Sundar as Ravi
- Marina as Poongavanam
- Rajeev as Devaram
- Ponmaran as Ponmaran
- Gunasekhar as Mani
- Kuyili as Saroja, Thamarai's mother
- Vadivukkarasi as Thamarai's aunt
- Sempuli Jagan as Puli
- Venkatesh
- Hemanth

== Soundtrack ==
The soundtrack was composed by Bharani, with lyrics written by Na. Muthukumar.

Song	Singer(s)	Duration
"Uthe Uthe Parthiya"	Sujatha Mohan, Bharani	4:43
"Patchi Parakuthu"	Ranjith, Suchitra Krishnamoorthi	3:45
"Vizhigal Randum"	Harish Raghavendra, Saindhavi	4:34
"Kadhal Kadhal"	Haricharan	1:09
"Sandakozhi"	Malathy Lakshman	4:38
"Teen Age Vayasikudhan"	Haricharan	3:42

== Reception ==
Malini Mannath from Chennai Online wrote "A very promising first half that raises expectations. And the director's inability to maintain the same pace and interest in the second half. 'Thirudi' falls in this trap".
