= Karavali (film) =

- Theatrical release poster
- Directed by: Gurudatha Ganiga
- Screenplay by: Tejovrusha; Ravi Sriram; Kowshik Kooduraste; Gurudatha Ganiga
- Story by: Chandrashekar Bandiyappa
- Produced by: Gurudatha Ganiga
- Starring: Prajwal Devaraj; Raj B. Shetty; Mitra; Sampada Hulivana; Ramesh Indira; Govinde Gowda; Sushmitha Bhat
- Cinematography: Abhimanyu Sadanandan
- Edited by: Pratheek Shetty
- Music by: Sachin Basrur
- Production companies: VK Films; Gurudatha Ganiga Films; Suram Movies; KVN Productions
- Release date: 24 July 2026
- Country: India
- Language: Kannada

Karavali is a 2026 Kannada-language action-drama film written, directed, and produced by Gurudatha Ganiga. Starring Prajwal Devaraj, Raj B. Shetty, and Sampada Hulivana in lead roles, alongside Mitra, Ramesh Indira, Govinde Gowda and Sushmitha Bhat in supporting roles. On 24 July 2026, it got released.

Set against the raw backdrop of coastal Karnataka' Karavali region, the film revolves around Kambala, the traditional buffalo race, exploring themes of indigenous identity and the conflict between human and nature.

== Cast ==
- Prajwal Devaraj as Dhananjay
- Raj B. Shetty as Maveera
- Mitra as Mahabala
- Sampada Hulivana as Dakshana
- Sushmitha Bhat as Bhoomi
- Ramesh Indira
- Govinde Gowda
- Niranjan Raju

== Soundtrack ==
The film's background score and soundtrack are composed by Sachin Basrur. On 25 June 2026, the title track "Baa Karavalige" was released.

No.	Title	Lyrics	Singer(s)	Length
1.	"Muddu Gumma"	Pramod Maravante	Sid Sriram	5:13
2.	"Baa Karavalige"	Pramod Maravante	Sai Vignesh	3:15
3.	"Rage of Kambala"	Pramod Maravante	Anand Sreeraj	3:08

== Production ==
The official promotional teaser "Arrival of Maveera" received positive reception. On 4 July 2026, the official trailer was launched.

== Reception ==
A. Sharadhaa of the Cinema Express said that "Gurudatha Ganiga has made something rare. The buffaloes never run for status. They never inherit feuds. Humans do. By the final frame, what remains are the people and the price they pay." Vivek M.V. of The Hindu said that "Ganiga attempts to tell a complex story and transports you to a different world, but Karavali fails to leave you with an emotional high." Pranati A S of the Deccan Herald said that "While Karavali shines in its technical execution, it ultimately falters under the weight of a weak screenplay. It falls short of being a fully satisfying cinematic experience."
