= Yamuna Srinidhi =

Indian dancer, choreographer

- Born: Mysore, Karnataka, India
- Occupations: Dancer, Choreographer and Actress
- Years active: 2013 – present
- Known for: Ashwini Nakshatra
- Spouse: Srinidhi
- Children: 2

Yamuna Srinidhi is an Indian Bharatanatyam dancer, choreographer and actress who works in Kannada films and serials. She is also a social worker and NCC volunteer.

== Career ==
Yamuna Srinidhi, initially an Bharatanatyam dancer, has undergone her Bharathanatyam training from various Bharathanatyam gurus for various styles and has taught dance to almost 700 students in USA. After leading a life in USA for 15 years as a Classical Bharathanatyam dancer, choreographer and a cultural torchbearer, Yamuna moved back to India in 2012. Later she started her acting career through the Kannada serial Ashwini Nakshatra. She has acted in more than 20 movies with the leading actors of Kannada industry. She has also acted in more than 10 serials.

== Personal life ==
Yamuna is married and has a son and daughter.

== Other works ==
In 2019, Yamuna canvassed for BJP candidate Pratap Simha at Ganesh Nagar in N.R. Constituency in Bengaluru. and also she was appointed as cultural ambassador for Navika Kannada Convention. She teaches dance to the financially under privileged kids in the rural areas. She has won the Karnataka Women Achiever's Award in 2018. In 2019, she spread awareness regarding the breast cancer issues. In 2021, She registered for the donation of her eyesight and she also distributed ration kits to the needy employees of Mysuru Zoo.

== Television ==
Serials

| Year | Serials | Role | Channel | Language |
|---|---|---|---|---|
| 2013–2015 | Ashwini Nakshatra | Abhinaya | ETV Kannada | Kannada |
| 2014–2017 | Amruthavarshini | | Star Suvarna | Kannada |
| 2015–2016 | Ondooralli Raja Rani | | Zee Kannada | Kannada |
| 2015–2016 | Madhumagalu | | Udaya TV | Kannada |
| 2015–2016 | Sakshi | | Udaya TV | Kannada |
| 2016–2018 | Aaramane | | Udaya TV | Kannada |
| 2017–2019 | Triveni Sangama | | Star Suvarna | Kannada |
| 2018–2020 | Eradu Kanasu | | Star Suvarna | Kannada |
| 2018 | Nagakannike | | Colors Kannada | Kannada |
| 2018–2020 | Kamali | Gouri/Saroja/Mangalamma | Zee Kannada | Kannada |
| 2018–2019 | Manasa Sarovara | | Udaya TV | Kannada |
| 2020–2021 | Manasaare | Kausalya and Vasuki | Udaya TV | Kannada |
| 2021–2022 | Kanyakumari | Dhanalakshmi | Colors Kannada | Kannada |
| 2023–2024 | Anu Ane Nenu | | Gemini TV | Telugu |
| 2024 | Bigg Boss Kannada 11 | Contestant (20th Place) | Colors Kannada | Kannada |
| 2025-2026 | Yajamana | Sumithra | Colors Kannada | Kannada |
| 2026 | Gettimelam | | Zee Tamil | Tamil |
| 2026-Present | Lakshmi Nivasa | Vaidehi | Zee Kannada | Kannada |

Reality Shows

| Year | Serials | Role | Channel |
|---|---|---|---|
| 2019 | Dance Samara | Judge | DD Chandana |

Web Series

| Year | Serials | Role |
|---|---|---|
| 2019 | Raktha Chandana | |
| 2021 | Hakuna Matata | Anjumala |

== Filmography ==
| Year | Film | Language |
|---|---|---|
| 2014 | Dil Rangeela | Kannada |
| 2015 | Melody | Kannada |
| 2015 | Buguri | Kannada |
| 2015 | Ranna | Kannada |
| 2016 | Nan Love Track | Kannada |
| 2016 | Kathe Chitrakathe Nirdeshana Puttanna | Kannada |
| 2016 | Shivalinga | Kannada |
| 2016 | Chakravyuha | Kannada |
| 2016 | Golisoda | Kannada |
| 2016 | Jaguar | Kannada |
| 2016 | Jaguar | Telugu |
| 2017 | Preethi Prema | Kannada |
| 2017 | Chalagaara | Kannada |
| 2017 | Tarak | Kannada |
| 2017 | Tiger Galli | Kannada |
| 2018 | 3 Gante 30 Dina 30 Second | Kannada |
| 2018 | Prema Baraha | Kannada |
| 2018 | Sollividava | Tamil |
| 2018 | Rajaratha | Kannada |
| 2018 | Asathoma Sadgamaya | Kannada |
| 2018 | Bicycle Boys | Kannada |
| 2018 | May 1st | Kannada |
| 2018 | Galli Bakery | Kannada |
| 2018 | Karshanam | Kannada |
| 2018 | Devadas | Telugu |
| 2019 | Birbal Trilogy | Kannada |
| 2019 | Face 2 Face | Kannada |
| 2019 | Missing Boy | Kannada |
| 2019 | Randhawa | Kannada |
| 2019 | Manasinata | Kannada |
| 2019 | Odeya | Kannada |
| 2021 | Yuvarathnaa | Kannada |
| 2022 | Bairagee | Kannada |
| 2022 | Love 360 | Kannada |
| 2022 | September 13 | Kannada |
| 2023 | Sapta Saagaradaache Ello – Side B | Kannada |
| 2025 | Ah! | Kannada |
| 2025 | Rippan Swamy | Kannada |
| TBA | Kranthi | Telugu |
