= Ponnukku Thanga Manasu (TV series) =

- Genre: Soap opera
- Created by: Chitra Shenoy
- Based on: Sthreedhanam
- Written by: Pradeep Manikkar R. Ramesh Babu Joyci Pradeep Sethu
- Directed by: Harrison
- Starring: Vindhuja Vikraman; Ashwin; Chitra Shenoy; Swathi Tara
- Theme music composer: Ilaivayan
- Country of origin: India
- Original language: Tamil
- No. of seasons: 1
- No. of episodes: 559

Production
- Cinematography: Martin Joe
- Editor: S.Mathan kumar
- Camera setup: Multi-camera
- Running time: approx. 20–24 minutes per episode
- Production company: Risun Pictures

Original release
- Network: Star Vijay
- Release: 20 August 2018 – 12 December 2020

Related
- Sthreedhanam

Ponnukku Thanga Manasu (transl. The Girl with a Golden Heart) is a 2018 Tamil-language soap opera, which aired on Vijay TV from 20 August 2018 to 12 December 2020 for 559 episodes. The serial is available on Disney+ Hotstar.

It is a remake of the Malayalam serial Sthreedhanam that aired on Asianet. It stars Vindhuja Vikraman, Ashwin, Chitra Shenoy, Tejaswini Shekhar, Jennifer Antony and K. S. G. Venkatesh.

== Synopsis ==
Prashanth's wedding kicks off the show. He is the eldest of the three sons of Sethulakshmi and Lakshmanan Pillai. They come from a well-to-do family. Prashanth was caught in the middle Divya from the Sekaran family by Sethulakshmi, a dominating and greedy mother. Sethulakshmi, on either hand, was not delighted that Divya would be welcomed into their household with a worthless grant and a small amount of wealth. She only wants Divya's money. She made issues for Divya and her parents by abusing her position as Divya's mother-in-law. Mayuri, Prashanthan's cousin, inquired about the family's situation. She planned to destabilize Prashanthan and Divya's marriage to marry Prashanthan. Meanwhile, Sethulakshmi found out that Divya's jewelry are all fake, so she brings Divya back to their house. And later finds out that it is a settlement between Prashanthan and Govindhan, Divya's father. At last, Sethulakshmi realises her mistake and feels sorry for Divya and Prashanth for treating her in a bad way where she is arrested and Prashanth and Divya live happily after years of torture of Sethulakshmi. Whereas Veni was thrown out due to nonsense which she played in the house.

== Cast ==
=== Main ===
- Radhika Rao as Divya Prashanth (episode 1–100)
  - Vindhuja Vikraman replaced Rao (episode 101–559) (Prashanth's wife)
    - She is the main protagonist of this serial. She is a person who loves Prashanth and she fights and is treated badly by Sethulakshmi because of less dowry.
- Ashwin as Prashanth Lakshmanan (Divya's husband)
  - He is Sethulakshmi son who marries Divya Prashant. He loves Divya and treats her well.
- Sirisha Sougandh as Sethulakshmi Lakshmanan (episodes 1–71)
  - (Chitra Shenoy replaced Sougandh (episodes 73–559)

commonly called as Sethu (Lakshmanan 1st wife, Prashanth

  - She is greedy in this serial. She is the main antagonist in this story. She wants people to marry rich people and takes dowry and gold. She wants to destroy the relationship of Prashant and Divya so that he can marry Mayuri; Vasanth, Karthik and Shubha's mother

=== Supporting ===
- Tejaswini Shekar (episodes 1–446) / Swathi Thara (episodes 448–559) as Veni Vasanth (Vasanth's wife)
- Yuvarani (episodes 1–210) / Jennifer Antony (episodes 211–559) as Shanthi Sukumaran (Veni's mother)
- K. S. G. Venkatesh as Ramanathan (Divya and Vidhya's father)
- Rajani Murali as Manjula Ramanathan (Divya and Vidhya's mother)
- Vinuja Vijay
  - Sri Swetha Mahalakshmi as Vidya (Divya's younger sister)
- Kalyan Khanna as Mahesh (Vidya's fiancé)
- Vishwam/ Kumaresan/ KPAC Saji as Lakshmanan (Prashanth, Vasanth, Karthik, Shubha and Karthika's father)
- Devi Chandana as Saradha Lakshmanan (Lakshmanan's second wife)
- Alice Christy as Karthika (Lakshmanan's daughter)
- Vikash Sampath as Karthik Lakshmanan (Sethu's third son) (Dubbed by: Vignesh a.k.a Vicky)
- Nisha Hedge as Varshini (Karthik's wife)
- Niyaz Khan as Vasanth Lakshmanan (Sethu's second son)
- Suju Vasan (Episode 1-244) / Vaishnavi Arulmozhi (Episode 245-559) as Shubha (Sethu's daughter)
- Mahalakshmi as Mayoori
- Bindu Aneesh as Nalini (Mayoori's mother)
- Kottayam Rasheed as Sukumaran (Veni's father)
- VJ Krrish as Manmadhan (Madhan)
- Ayyappan as Dr. Kavi
- Dharini as Kavi's mother
- L. Raja as Varshini's father
- Bhagya / Lakshmi as Varshini's mother

== Adaptations ==
Language	Title	Original release	Network(s)	Episodes
Malayalam	Sthreedhanam സ്ത്രീധനം	2 July 2012 – 14 May 2016	Asianet	1147
Tamil	Ponnukku Thanga Manasu பொன்னுகு தங்க மனசு	20 August 2018 – 12 December 2020	Star Vijay	559
