= Manasaare (TV series) =

Indian Kannada-language soap opera

- Genre: Soap opera; Romance
- Written by: B. Ajay, B.G. Manohar
- Screenplay by: Vinay Krishnaswamy
- Story by: Dialogues: Vinod Mahadev
- Directed by: Ravi Kishore
- Starring: Priyanka Chincholi; Sujay Hegde
- Opening theme: "Ninna Preethige"
- Country of origin: India
- Original language: Kannada
- No. of seasons: 1
- No. of episodes: 415

Production
- Executive producer: B. Krishnamurthy
- Producer: Gururaj Kulkarni
- Camera setup: Multi-camera
- Running time: 20–22 minutes
- Production company: Dhruv Media Craft

Original release
- Network: Udaya TV
- Release: 24 February 2020 – 13 November 2021

Related
- Pournami

Manasaare was an Indian Kannada language soap opera which premiered on 24 February 2020 in Udaya TV and ended on 13 November 2021. The show stars Priyanka Chincholi and Sujay Hegde in lead roles. It is the remake of the Telugu serial Pournami.

== Plot ==
The story revolves around an innocent elder daughter Prarthana, the protagonist of the show, who has been waiting for years to get the love of her father. All that she wishes for and wants in life is her father's love. However, she is fortunate enough as she only gets unconditional love from her stepmother who treats her as her own flesh and blood.

== Cast ==
=== Main ===
- Priyanka Chincholi as Prarthana Yuvaraj
- Sagar Biligowda / Sujay Hegde as Yuvaraj (Yuva)

=== Supporting ===
- Suneel Puranik / Harish as Anand Mahendra
- Swathi as Devaki Anand
- Prakruthi Prasad as Pavani
- Unknown / Charith Balappa as Ram Charan
- Chitkala Biradar as Damayanti
- Yamuna Srinidhi as Vasuki
- Rajalakshmi as Prathana's grandmother
- Yamuna Srinidhi as Kausalya Anand (Died in serial)
- Sunethra Pandit as Vajramma
- Ramesh Pandit
- Vijay Koundinya as Bhoopathi

=== Cameo appearance ===
- Rishi as himself

== Adaptations ==
Language	Title	Original release	Network(s)	Last aired	Notes
Telugu	Pournami పౌర్ణమి	12 November 2018	Gemini TV	27 March 2021	Original
Kannada	Manasaare ಮನಸಾರೆ	24 February 2020	Udaya TV	13 November 2021	Remake
Tamil	Kannana Kanne கண்ணன கண்ணே	2 November 2020	Sun TV	4 March 2023	Remake
Bengali	Nayantara নয়নতারা	22 March 2021	Sun Bangla	30 April 2023	Remake
Malayalam	Kana Kanmani കാന കൺമണി	23 August 2021	Surya TV	23 July 2022	Remake
Marathi	Jau Nako Dur... Baba जाऊ नको दूर... बाबा	17 October 2021	Sun Marathi	4 November 2023	Remake

== Crossover and special episodes ==
- From 7 September 2020 to 11 September 2020 and from 6 May 2021 to 26 May 2021 it had a Mahasangama with Kavyanjali.
- From 4 January 2021 to 9 January 2021, it aired a one-hour special episode.
- Again from 14 April 2021 to 17 April 2021 it had a crossover with Kavyanjali for Yuva and Prathana marriage episodes.
