= Pournami (TV series) =

Indian Television series

- Genre: Drama; Family
- Written by: Mahendar Dongari (Varma); Dialogues; Narasimha murthy Nallam
- Screenplay by: Mahendar Dongari (Varma)
- Directed by: J N Raju
- Creative director: K V Kiran kumar
- Starring: Rashmi Prabhakar; Ek nadh Kiran kanth Samyuktha; Anil Allam; Bhavana
- Country of origin: India
- Original language: Telugu
- No. of episodes: 598

Production
- Producer: Vaidehi Rammurthy
- Cinematography: Saravanan
- Editors: Pasupuleti Gunashekar; Subrahmanyam Polisetty
- Camera setup: Multi camera
- Running time: 22 minutes
- Production company: Vision Time India Pvt Ltd

Original release
- Network: Gemini TV
- Release: 12 November 2018 – 27 March 2021

Pournami (transl. Full moon) is an Indian Telugu language soap opera directed by J N Raju. It premiered on Gemini TV on 12 November 2018 and ended on 27 March 2021. The serial stars Rashmi Prabhakar, Ek Nadh, Kiran kanth as main protagonists and Samyuktha, Anil Allam and Bhavana in pivotal roles.

== Plot ==
The show revolves around Pournami and her father. Pournami loses her mother at a very young age, which makes her father Chakravarthy, a widower. Chakravarthy disliked Pournami since her birth as he blames her for his wife's death and his wealth. Pournami craves for love and attention from her father. She hasn't received it from anyone. But, one day, her father asks her to leave the house. The rest of the series shows Pournami try whatever she can to win her father's heart over.

== Cast ==
- Rashmi Prabhakar as Pournami and vennela
- Eknadh as Pardhu (Pournami's husband)
- Surya / RajKumar / Anil Allam as
  - Chakravarthy (Pournami and Pavani's father)
- Bhavana as Vasuki (Pavani's biological mother and Pournami's foster mother)
- Kiran Kanth as Rakhi, Pavani's husband
- Haritha as Vaidehi, Chakravarthi's sister
- Samyuktha as Pavani (Pournami's sister)
- Amrutha as Maha (Pournami's cousin)
- Suraj Krishna as Lokesh
- Chalapathi Raju as Yogendra (Aishwarya's father)
- Aishwarya Raj / Preethi Varma as Aishwarya
- Vinod Chakravarty as Ram
- Sharif Vikram as Sonu
- Ushasri as Chandrika, Sonu's mother
- Raja Babu as Obul Reddy, Nalini Devi's step-brother
- Naveena as Nalini Devi, Pardhu's mother
- Shilpa Reddy as Parvathi, Pardhu's sister
- Koteswara Rao as Rakhi's father
- Nakshatra as Jyothi
- Alapati Lakshmi as Vasuki's mother
- G.S Hari as Vasuki's father
- Seethamaalakshmi as Girija, Sonu's wife
- Surekha Vani as Vasundhara, Pournami's biological mother
- Dubbing Janaki as Pournami's grand mother

== Adaptations ==
| Language | Title | Original release | Network(s) | Last aired | Notes |
|---|---|---|---|---|---|
| Telugu | Pournami పౌర్ణమి | 12 November 2018 | Sun Gemini | 27 March 2021 | Original |
| Kannada | Manasaare ಮನಸಾರೆ | 24 February 2020 | Sun Udaya | 13 November 2021 | Remake |
| Tamil | Kannana Kanne கண்ணான கண்ணே | 2 November 2020 | Sun TV | 4 March 2023 | Remake |
| Bengali | Nayantara নয়নতারা | 22 March 2021 | Sun Bangla | 30 April 2023 | Remake |
| Malayalam | Kana Kanmani കാന കൺമണി | 23 August 2021 | Sun Surya | 23 July 2022 | Remake |
| Marathi | Jau Nako Dur... Baba जाऊ नको दूर... बाबा | 17 October 2021 | Sun Marathi | 4 November 2023 | Remake |
