= Arundhati (2016 TV series) =

Indian Tamil-language soap opera

- Genre: Soap opera mystery
- Written by: P. Ragavan
- Story by: Vasans Visual Ventures Team
- Directed by: Sellaiya Balapirasanth
- Starring: Reshmi; Senthinathan; Adhithiya; Udhay; Sekar; S. Priya; Shri
- Country of origin: India
- Original language: Tamil
- No. of episodes: 75

Production
- Producers: K.S. Sinivasn; S. Sharath
- Camera setup: Multi-camera
- Running time: approx. 20-22 minutes per episode
- Production company: Vasans Visual Ventures

Original release
- Network: Raj TV
- Release: 10 October 2016 – 6 January 2017

Arundathi is a 2016-2017 Tamil-language mystery soap opera that aired on Raj TV from 10 October 2016 to 6 January 2017 at 8:00 p.m. IST for 75 episodes. The show starred Reshmi, Senthinathan, Adhithiya, Udhay, Sekar, S. Priya, Shri and among others.

== Cast ==
- Rashmi Prabhakar as Sanghavi
- Senthilnathan as Selvendran
- Adhithiya
- Udhay
- Sekar
- Priya as Ambika
- Shreekumar
- Vijikanna
- Bhagyalakshmi
- Vijayalakshmi
- Serin as Kamini
- Subashree as Inspector Malavika
- Amutha
- Makesh
- Naveen
- Manikanda Raj
- Nakesh
- Suresh
- Karuna
- Pirabu
- Sashikumar Subramanium

== Original soundtrack ==
=== Soundtrack ===
Track listing
No.	Title	Lyrics	Singer(s)	Length
1.	"Kannaadi Kundil" (கண்ணாடி கூண்டில்)	Kiruthika	Sangeetharajith	3:00
