= Lakshmi Baramma =

2013 Indian Kannada TV series

- Genre: Drama
- Directed by: Sathish Krishnan
- Starring: Chandu R Gowda, Neha Gowda, Rashmi Prabhakar
- Country of origin: India
- Original language: Kannada
- No. of seasons: 6
- No. of episodes: 2125

Production
- Producer: Prakash Jayaram
- Production locations: Bengaluru, Karnataka
- Cinematography: Kumar
- Editor: Sujit Raj
- Camera setup: Multi-camera
- Running time: 22 minutes
- Production company: Shree Jaimatha Combines

Original release
- Network: Colors Kannada
- Release: 4 March 2013 – 25 January 2020

Related
- Lakshmi Baramma 2

Lakshmi Baramma is a Kannada serial that aired on Colors Kannada. It premiered on 4 March 2013 and is the second longest running Kannada TV series. The second season of the series, Lakshmi Baramma 2 aired from 13 March 2023. It starred Tanvi Rao, Shamanth Gowda, Bhumika Ramesh.

== Plot ==
Laxmi is an innocent village girl. She was an orphan and was raised by her grandmother. She had an evil step mother and her two sons. However, she had a good bonding with Nanjundi, her youngest stepbrother.

After marrying Chandan realises that her husband was in love with his girlfriend Shruthi. She wishes not to be an obstacle in his path and runs away from him. But the situation lands her to the house of Shruthi. On the other hand, Shruthi unknowing the truth about Laxmi accepts her as her younger sister and names her Chinnu much against the wishes of her mother.

The twist in the tale arrives when Shruthi is Chandan's girlfriend and their marriage fixed. Knowing this truth she consoles herself and decides to look into the marriage arrangements. At this time her marriage truth is discovered by Parvathi, her mother-in-law. Ranjith his uncle also aware of this truth. Kumudha, Chandan's evil aunt along with her secret husband Manoj tries to acquire the whole property in her name. The family is unaware of her evil plans. Kailash, Shruthi's father discovers Kumudha's truth but he was beaten to death by her husband. He was timely saved by Laxmi. Kumudha who is furious at Laxmi is furious and learns of her marriage secret. Now she plays a mind game with her. Kailash slowly recovers and then he warns Kumudha. Later even he gets to know the truth of Laxmi. Parvathi and Kailash decide to tell this truth to Shruthi and finally, everybody knows the truth.

Shruthi's mother Kalpana develops hatred against her. Using this Kumudha plays mind games with the family. Finally, Kumudha is exposed by Kailash, Ranjith and Laxmi. In the meantime Shruthi was pregnant. Her child is believed to be dead. Later they get another baby through in vitro fertilization (IVF) process and Laxmi becomes the surrogate mother. Later the earlier baby which was presumed to be dead was alive and it was captured and raised by Kumudha. After much hardship, the elder baby is back with the family and it was named Siri. The second child with Laxmi as a surrogate mother was named Adhya.

At this time a new character enters the lives of this joint family named Aniruddh. He gains the trust of the family and later he kidnaps Shruthi and makes her forget her past and convinces her that she is Shravya. On the other hand, the family believes Shruthi has died. Laxmi discovers Shruthi is alive and she is now identified as Shravya. She is not believed and she leaves the house to return with her sister.

Chandu's family disguises themselves as the Chakravarthi family, a wealthy business family from London and enter Bhargavi Devi's house. Ramachandra Rayaru disguises as Vasanth Chakravarthy, the eldest member of the family, his wife Sulochana as Shalini Chakravarthi, their daughter Kalpana as Sumalatha Chakravarthi and her husband Kailash as Amarnath Chakravarthi (S/O Shalini and Vasanth Chakravarthi). Ramu disguises as Sudeep Chakravarthi (S/O Sumalatha and Amarnath) and Chandu as car driver, Yuvraj Singh, Shveta as Sushma - daughter of Shalini and Vasanth. Ranjith disguises as Shvetananda Swamiji. The rest of the plot revolves around how Laxmi, Chandan along with the family bringing Shruthi back into their lives and remind her of the past.

== Cast ==
=== Main ===
- Chandan Kumar / Akarsh Byramudi / Shine Shetty / Chandan Gowda as Chandan / Chandu / Yuvraj Singh
- Kavitha Gowda / Rashmi Prabhakar as Lakshmi / Lacchi / Chinnu
- Neha Gowda as Shruthi / Gombe / Shravya

=== Recurring ===
- Vijay Suriya as Siddharth / Siddu
- Deepa Ravishankar as Parvathi, Chandu's mother
- Bhagyashri Rao as Kumudha, Shruti's aunt
- Anikha Sindya as Kumudha, Shruti's aunt
- Jeevan Neenasam as Ranjith / Shvetananda Swamiji
- Vijay as Ramu / Sudeep Chakravarthi
- Navya Gowda as Shwetha / Sushma
- Lakshmi Siddaiyya as Kalpana / Sumalatha Chakravarthi
- Jayabalu as Sulochana / Shalini Chakravarthi
- Dattanna as Ramachandra Rayaru / Vasanth Chakravarthi
- Rohith Nagesh as Manoj
- Hmt Vijay as Boregowda
- Vikram Vasudeva Rao as Nanjundi
- Vasanth Kumar as Kailash / Amarnath Chakravarthi
- Niranjan Kumar as Basava
- Chi Bharath as Giri
- Kamalashri as Thathamma
- Lakshmi Sanjay as Revathi
- Ramaswamy as Yeshwanth
- Baby Monisha as Siri
- Anil Kumar Tiptur
- Rohith Rangaswamy as Anirudh / Arun - Bhargavi Devi's brother
- Roopesh Kumar as Guru - Bhargavi Devi's brother
- Nandini Guru as Bhargavi Devi
- Soumya Bhat as Medha - Bhargavi Devi's daughter
- Sagar Gowda as Vasu - Bhargavi Devi's servant

== Crossover ==
The serials Kulavadhu and Lakshmi Baramma were interconnected for months together in the quest to find the missing daughter of the character Gombe. The girl who was missing was being taken care of by the family in Kulavadhu serial and finally, the important characters from both serials come together for a while till the missing girl's episode gets over.

== Adaptations ==
Language	Title	Original release	Network	Last aired	Notes
Kannada	Lakshmi Baramma ಲಕ್ಷ್ಮಿ ಬಾರಮ್ಮಾ	4 March 2013	Colors Kannada	25 January 2020	Original
Gujarati	Laxmi Sadaiv Mangalam લક્ષ્મી સદૈવ મંગલમ	29 January 2018	Colors Gujarati	17 April 2021	Remake
Tamil	Vandhal Sridevi வந்தாள் ஸ்ரீதேவி	11 April 2018	Colors Tamil	28 June 2019	Remake
Marathi	Lakshmi Sadaiv Mangalam लक्ष्मी सदैव मंगलम्	14 May 2018	Colors Marathi	25 May 2019	Remake
Hindi	Mishri मिश्री	3 July 2024	Colors TV	3 November 2024	Remake
