= Nayantara (TV series) =

2021 Indian television series

- Genre: Drama; Romance; Comedy; Family
- Created by: Crystal Dreams Entertainment
- Developed by: Mahendar Dongari
- Written by: Bodhisatya Mazumdar
- Theme music composer: Aneek Dhar
- Opening theme: by Anweshaa
- Country of origin: India
- Original language: Bengali
- No. of episodes: 739

Production
- Camera setup: Multi-camera
- Running time: 22 minutes

Original release
- Network: Sun Bangla
- Release: 22 March 2021 – 30 April 2023

Related
- Pournami

Nayantara is a Bengali daily soap which aired on Sun Bangla from 22 March 2021. The daily soap is a remake of Telugu daily soap Pournami which was aired on Gemini TV.

== Plot ==
Adidev and Averi are happy couples. They both love each other immensely. Only thing that don't have is a child. In their married life of 10 years, but Averi is unable to conceive. One day Averi gets pregnant, but she soon learns from her Gynecologist that she is having some complications. Adidev is totally unaware of this, but he is soon informed by the doctor. Adidev tells Averi that it could put her life into risk, and tells her to give consent for an abortion. But Averi is reluctant, and she dies while giving birth to her daughter. Adidev cannot surmise his wife's death, and he blames his daughter for her mother's death, and starts to hate her. But Adidev's mother names the child Tara and grows her up.

In a dramatic way, the scene shifts twenty years forward. Tara has grown up, and now is a beautiful girl, but she still has not got her father's love and affection. While in the recent years, his father marries another woman and has a daughter. Tara lives with there grandmother, her step-mother and her step-sister. They used to think the same of Tara like his father Adidev, but as years passed by, they understood, that she had no hands for her mother's death, and now they try to make up the long lost relationship between the father and the daughter.

Tara falls in love with Sam but hides her feelings to her family due to her father's hatred. However, despite her father's hatred, a course of events that take place, which had been planned by Tara's step-mother, grandmother and step-sister, and they end up marrying each other.

== Cast ==
=== Main ===
- Hiya Mukherjee as Tara Maitra, wife of Samudra, Averi and Adidev's daughter and Preeti's stepsister.
- Subhajit Saha as Samudra Maitra aka Sam: Tara's husband, Preeti's ex-love interest and Adidev's son – in law.
- Gaurav Mondal as Adidev Maitra: Tara's father and Preeti's step father

=== Recurring ===
- Swarnakamal Dutta as Madhuja Maitra:
- Arpita Roy as Preeti Maitra:
- Sayanta Modak as Rahul Maitra
- Payel De as Averi Maitra:
- Debika Mitra as Adidev's mother
- Abhijit Guha as Samudra's father
- Ishita Chatterjee as Samudra's mother

=== Guest appearances ===
- P. C. Sorcar Jr. as Magician: appeared in one episode.
- Mumtaz Sorcar as supporting magician: appeared in one episode.
