= Sun Udaya =

Indian Kannada-language TV channel

- Logo used since 2026
- Country: India
- Broadcast area: Worldwide
- Network: Sun TV Network
- Headquarters: Bengaluru, Karnataka, India

Programming
- Language: Kannada
- Picture format: 1080p HDTV

Ownership
- Owner: Sun Group
- Sister channels: Sun TV Network (Channels)

History
- Launched: 1 June 1994 (32 years ago)

Links
- Website: Sun Udaya HD

Sun Udaya (formerly known as Udaya TV) is an Indian Kannada language general entertainment pay television channel owned by Sun TV Network. Udaya TV is telecast in several nations like India, some Gulf countries and the United States. Sun Udaya was launched on 1 June 1994.

== History ==
Sun Udaya was incorporated on 1 June 1994 as a private limited company engaged in television broadcasting with a registered office at Chennai, Tamil Nadu. It was launched by the chairman of Sun TV, Kalanithi Maran, and it started broadcasting from 1 June 1994. It was the first Kannada satellite channel to go on air.

It grew rapidly and by May 2000, Udaya TV has captured 70% of ad spending on TV in the state of Karnataka. In 2000 and 2001, it won the Indian Television Academy's award for the best Kannada TV channel for 2001 It forayed into FM radio broadcasting by launching Vishaka FM, an FM channel in Visakhapatnam. It was a free-on-air channel until 1 August 2004, when it was made a pay channel with a subscription fee of Rs. 18.

In February 2006, the directors of Udaya TV were Kalanithi Maran, S. Selvam and Kaveri Kalanidhi. S. Selvam was also the Director of the Bangalore Bureau of Udaya TV. In November 2006, its owner Kalanithi Maran merged Udaya TV Ltd. with Sun TV Network along with Gemini TV Ltd for IPO listing of Sun TV Network.

Network18 Group has 50% dealing distribution with Sun TV Network, which led them to make Sun18. In July 2010, with the creation of Sun18, Sun TV Network became responsible for the South Indian market, while Network18 was responsible for the North Indian market.

== Programming ==
=== Current broadcasts ===
Premiere date	Name	Adaptation of
8 December 2025	Ratha Sapthami	Tamil TV series Marumagal
7 April 2025	Sindhu Bhairavi	Tamil TV series Aadukalam
2 September 2025	Mangalya	Tamil TV series Moondru Mudhichu
01 June 2026	Mahalakshmi Maduve	Tamil TV series Lakshmi
23 March 2026	Mooguthi Malli	Bilingual Version of Telugu TV series Mukkera Meenakshi
22 July 2024	Shanthi Nivasa	
19 February 2024	Mynaa	Tamil TV series Singapennae
02 March 2026	KrishnaVamshi	Tamil TV series Pudhu Vasantham
17 February 2025	Anupallavi	Tamil TV series Sundari 2
2 September 2025	Sindhu Bhairavi	Tamil TV series Aadukalam

=== Former broadcasts ===
Original series

Name	First aired	Last aired	Notes
Sevanthi	25 February 2019	04 July 2026	Tamil TV series Roja
Anna Thangi	22 November 2021	23 August 2025	Remake of Tamil TV series Vanathai Pola
Shambhavi	11 September 2023	30 May 2026	
Sindhu Bhairavi	7 April 2025	30 May 2026	Tamil TV series Aadukalam
Nethravathi	15 March 2021	27 May 2023	
Kasthuri Nivasa	9 September 2019	13 August 2022	
Kavyanjali	3 August 2020	26 February 2022	
Manasaare	24 February 2020	13 November 2021	Remake of Telugu TV series Pournami
Nandini	23 January 2017	31 July 2020	
Nayaki	17 June 2019	9 April 2020	Remake of Tamil TV series Nayagi
Jai Hanuman	8 October 2018	20 February 2019	
Kannadi	19 November 2001	29 August 2003	
Thanu Ninnadu	30 April 2001	26 October 2001	

=== Reality shows ===
Title	Original telecast	Host	Reference
Aksharamaale	1998–2015	Abhijith, Sangeetha Ravishankar, Anuradha Bhat	
Chinnara Chilipili Season 2	2020	Umashree, Shalini	
Crazy Time	2017–2018		

== Sister channels ==
=== Udaya Movies ===
Udaya Movies is an Indian Kannada language movie pay television channel It is a part of the Sun TV Network. it was launched on 25 May 2000 as Ushe TV and later renamed as Udaya Movies.

=== Udaya Music ===
Udaya Music is a Kannada language music pay television channel. It is owned by Sun TV Network. and was launched on 5 February 2006 as Udaya 2 (U2) and later renamed as Udaya Music.

=== Chintu TV ===
Chintu TV is India's first Kannada language kids pay television channel owned by Sun TV Network. The target audience is children aged between 3 and 14. It was launched on 11 April 2009.

=== Udaya Comedy ===
Udaya Comedy is an Indian Kannada language comedy pay television channel owned by Sun TV Network. It was launched on 7 April 2009.

== Defunct channels ==
=== Udaya News ===
Udaya News was the Kannada language News Channel owned by Sun TV Network. it was launched on 5 August 2004 as (Udaya Varthegalu) and later renamed as Udaya News. the channel ceased its operation after 19 years on 24 October 2017 due to mounting losses and competition. Udaya News was shut down on 1 February 2019.

== Awards ==
- Indian Television Academy's award for the best Kannada TV channel for 2001
- Indian Television Academy's award for the best Kannada TV channel for 2002
