= Gayatri Arun =

Indian actress

Gayathri Arun
- Born: Cherthala, Alappuzha, Kerala, India
- Other name: Gayathri S.
- Occupations: Actress; TV host Author
- Years active: 2006, 2013- present

Gayathri Arun is an Indian actress known for her work in Malayalam films and television serials. She is well known for portraying the character Deepthi IPS in Malayalam soap opera, Parasparam. She also acted in movies such as Sarvopari Palakkaran, Ormma, One, Ennalum Ente Aliya and Kalamkaval. She hosted various television shows. Her first book named Achappam Kadhakal was published on 5 September 2021.

== Filmography ==
Key
†	Denotes films that have not yet been released

=== Films ===
- All films are in Malayalam language unless otherwise noted.

Year	Title	Role	Notes	Ref.
2017	Sarvopari Palakkaran	ACP Chandra Sivakumar	Debut	
2019	Ormma	Rajashree	Lead role	
2019	Thrissur Pooram	Giri's mother	Cameo	
2021	One	Seena		
2023	Ennalum Ente Aliya	Lakshmi		
2024	Idiyan Chandhu	Sneha Teacher		
2025	Kalamkaval	Shiny		

=== Television ===
- All TV series and shows are in Malayalam language

Year	Title	Role	Channel	Notes	Ref.
2006	Kalalayavarnangal	Host	Kairali TV		
2006	Gandharva Sangeetham	Host	Kairali TV		
2006	Circus	Host	Kairali TV		
2006	India@60	Host	Manorama News		
2013	Indira	Indira	Mazhavil Manorama	Replaced Sujitha	
2013–2018	Parasparam	Deepthi IPS	Asianet	Lead role	
2017	The People's Choice	Host	Asianet		
2017	Interview with Sugathakumari	Host	Asianet		
2017–2019	Laughing Villa	Host	Surya TV	Season 2, 3	
2020	Aksharathettu	Herself	Mazhavil Manorama	Cameo Appearance in Promo	
2022	Palunku	Herself	Asianet	Cameo Appearance	
2023	Ente Amma Superaa	Host	Mazhavil Manorama		
2023	Mazhavil entertainment awards 2023	Host	Mazhavil Manorama		
2024	Actors Round Table season 2	Host	Manorama Max		
2025—present	Amme Mookambike	Vidyamma	Surya TV		

==== Special appearances ====
Year	Title	Role	Channel	Notes	Ref.
2014	Badai Bungalow	Guest	Asianet		
2014	Aswamedham	Participant	Kairali TV		
2014	Don't Do Don't Do	Participant	Asianet Plus		
2015	Ningalkkum Aakaam Kodeeshwaran	Participant	Asianet		
2017	Onnum Onnum Moonu	Guest	Mazhavil Manorama		
2018	Day with a Star	Guest	Kaumudy TV		
2019	Swapnakoodile Thashakkar	Host	Surya TV		
2019	Annie's Kitchen	Guest	Amrita TV		
2019	Comedy Utsavam	Guest	Flowers TV		
2019	Ennishtam	Guest	ACV		
2021	Top Singer Season 2	Guest	Flowers TV		
2022	Flowers Oru Kodi	Participant	Flowers TV		

== Published works ==
- Gayathri Arun (2021). Achappam Kathakal. Kerala, India: Niyatham Books. ISBN 9780000135506.
