= Rahul Easwar =

Indian activist and social commentator

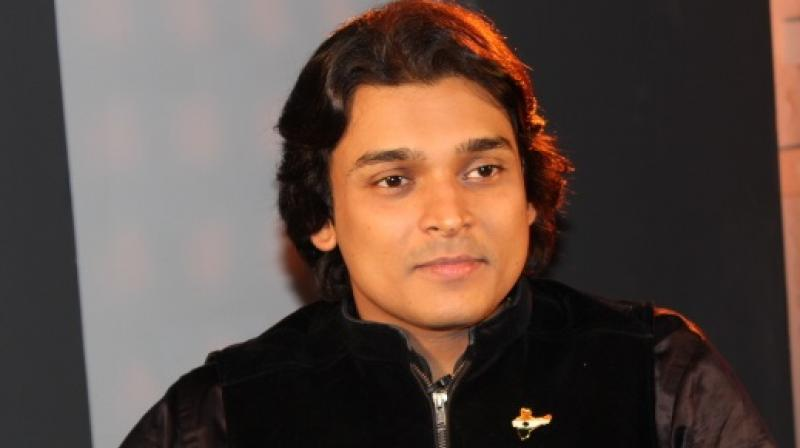
- Born: Kerala, India
- Education: Indian Institute of Management Ahmedabad; London School of Economics
- Occupations: Activist; social commentator
- Spouse: Deepa Rahul Easwar

Rahul Easwar is an Indian social commentator, right wing activist, advocate, and author of philosophy from Kerala.

== Early life ==
Rahul Easwar was born in Kerala, to Easwaran Namboothiri and Mallika into a Malayali Nambudiri Brahmin family. He is also the grandson of Kandararu Maheshwararu, who was the senior priest of the Sabarimala Temple.

== Work ==
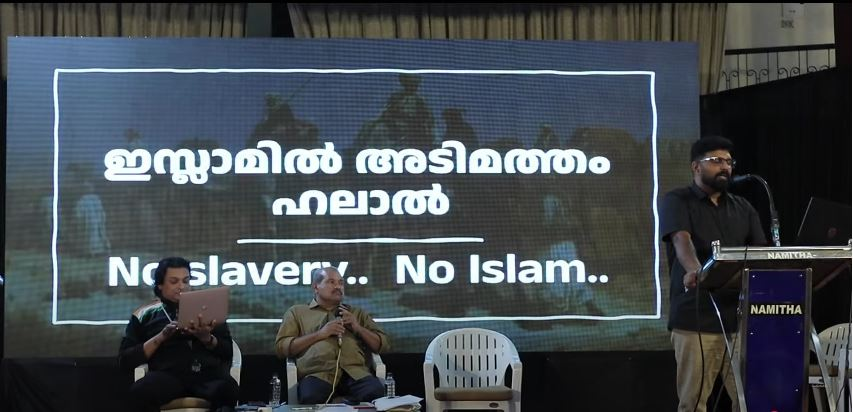
Rahul representing Islam debating with ex-Muslim activist Liyakkathali C. M. on slavery in Islam, 2025.

He is an executive member of the Munnokka Samudaya Samrakshana Munnani (Forward Caste Protection Front) and the secretary of the Hindu Parliament. Easwar was selected as the Flag Ambassador of the Mahatma Gandhi National Foundation which aims to achieve National integration. Easwar proposed a Commission for Men on the lines of the Commission for Women and Youth Commission.

He is a ubiquitous presence on Malayalam regional TV News channels and National Indian TV news Channels, often being described as a "right-wing political activist". He has participated in more than 3100 TV debates across global, national and regional channels like BBC, CNN, Republic, Times Now, NDTV, India Today, Zee, Asianet, Manorama and Mathrubhumi. He was the winner of Malayalee House, an adaptation of the reality television show Big Brother. He has given talks at TEDxIIM, TEDxSRM and TEDxNMIMS.

== Personal life ==
Rahul is married to Deepa (née Deepa Vijayan Pillai), who is from a Nair family. They have two children.

== Controversies ==
When Keralam Government decided to give the Raja Ravi Varma Puraskaram award to the artist M. F. Husain in 2007, Easwar initiated a campaign against him for alleged anti-Hindu sentiments resulting in the retraction of the award. Easwar has conducted campaigns for tribal rights in Kerala and was arrested along with thousand members of the Malayaraya Tribals.

Easwar protested against the Travancore Devaswom Board and campaigned in favour of letting members of the Malayaraya Scheduled Tribe (ST) community light the Makaravilakku light at Sabarimala. He was detained by the police for leading the protest.

Easwar defended Mata Amritanandamayi over controversies related to the allegations made by Gail Tredwell. He also congratulated the Travancore Royal Family for the victory in the Padmanabha Swamy Temple case and wishes to free all temples from government control. Easwar articulated the difference between the Makara Jyothi and Makara Vilakku, bringing closure to a long-standing controversy. He and MLA P.C George were engaged in a legal battle for the rights of the Malayaraya Tribals who were involved in the 'Makaravilakku' in Sabarimala.

During an interview to India Today, Easwar pointed that temples have economic incentives to entertain crowds, which often results in the use of elephants for the spectacle. The root cause of mistreatment, he believes, is a lack of spiritual education. "Our temples have become carnival spaces and tourist places, devoid of spiritual meaning and content." Easwar recommended as a reform, one-hour Saturday spiritual education for Hindus, similar to Friday for Muslims and Sunday for Christians. He supports the cultivation of "Secular Hindu unity" in Kerala. He went to court against the hate speech by Hindu leader Sadhvi Prachi against the Muslim community.

He proposed that the "Hindu majority consolidation should not be anti-minority and it should be inclusive. He also quoted former DGP Siby Mathews on the issue of more than 80% of suicides being by Hindus, in contrast to a mere 8% suicide by Muslims, saying that they have socio-spiritual education.

Easwar received death threats from ISIS terrorists when he was the guest for the Jamat-e-Islami religious harmony function in Kochi.

He was attacked by left wing students from the Milad E Sherif Memorial College for his anti-beef festival & cow protection stance. They attacked and vandalized his car. Easwar received threats when he met Hadiya and Madani. Easwar released the video of Hadiya where she says her life is in danger and the Supreme Court took note of it when it was raised which later secured her release from captivity for Hadiya. A Supreme Court bench headed by the chief justice also expunged the allegations against Easwar. Easwar welcomed the entry of all believers to the Sabarimala temple irrespective of their religion. He also supported priesthood for all irrespective of caste. Easwar and Thushar Vellappaly, son of Vellapplly Nateshan demanded an anti forced conversion law in Kerala.

Females of age group 10 to 50 are prohibited from entering the Sabarimala temple, because the resident deity, Lord Ayyappā is a celibate (Naiṣṭika Brahmacārya). In September 2018, after a 20-year legal challenge, the Supreme Court lifted the ban. Easwar and his group Ayyappa Dharma Sena protested the decision. Easwar sparked the protests against Supreme Court verdict and became the face of the Sabarimala protests and was arrested.

== Media career ==
Year	Program	Role	Notes
2013	Malayalee House	Contestant	Winner
2016 - 2017	Smart Brain	Quiz Master	Quiz show
2018 – 2020	Sreshtabharatham	Judge	Host
2013 – Present	Around the World	Host	Safari TV
2026 – Present	Bigg Boss 8	Contestant	
