= Shalu Kurian =

Indian actress

- Occupations: Television and film actress; television host
- Years active: 2007–present
- Spouse: Melvin Philip (m. 2017)

Shalu Susan Kurian is an Indian actress who predominantly works in Malayalam television serials. She is best known for her character Varsha in the television series Chandanamazha, which had aired on Asianet.

She made her debut in the 2008 film Jubilee and went on to act in television serials such as Swami Ayyappan, Nizhalkkannadi, Kadamattathachan and Snehakoodu. She has also appeared in TV shows like Tamaar padaar, Super Jodi, Urvashi theatres and Star Magic.

== Biography ==
Kurian attended BMS school, Vazhoor St. Paul's and MD Seminary. She gained a degree at Bacelious college, Kottayam. She lives in Kottayam. She is married to Melvin and has a son, Alister Melvin.

== Filmography ==
=== Television ===
All TV series are in Malayalam language unless noted otherwise.

Year	Title	Role	Channel	Notes	Ref.
2004	Naalavathu Mudichu		Jaya TV	Uncredited Role - Tamil Serial	
2007	Krishnapaksham		DD Malayalam	Debut	
2007	Thingalum Tharakalum		Amrita TV		
2010-2011	Swami Ayyappan Saranam		Surya TV		
2011	Kadamattathachan	Mayamohini	Surya TV		
2011-2012	Snehakkodu	Priya	Surya TV		
2011-2014	Azhagi	Niraimathi	Sun TV	Tamil serial	
2012	Kanamarayathu				
2012-2013	Thendral	Lavanya	Sun TV	Tamil serial	
2012-2013	Nizhalkannadi	Thankamani	Surya TV		
2012-2013	Indira	Jalarani	Mazhavil Manorama		
2013	Mayamadhavam		Surya TV		
2013	Mechilpurangal	Bindhu Jayakumar	DD Malayalam	Telefilm	
2013–2014	Sarayu	Rajani	Surya TV		
2014	Unknown serial Amrita TV by Unni Cherian	Feminist	Amrita TV		
2014–2017	Chandanamazha	Varsha	Asianet		
2015	Chattambi Kalyani	Kalyani	JaiHind TV		
2015	Kalyani Kalavani	Vani	Asianet Plus		
2016	Chechiyamma	Nayana	Surya TV		
2016-2017	Kayamkulam Kochunniyude Makan	Naseema	Surya TV		
2017	Kudumba Police	CPO Alice	Kairali TV		
2017	Manchester Vazhi Manjadimukku		Asianet	Telefilm	
2018–2019	Seetha	Adhilekshmi	Flowers TV		
2018–2023	Thatteem Mutteem	Vidhubala	Mazhavil Manorama	Season 2, 4	
2019	Kuttikurumban	Asha	Zee Keralam		
2020	Aksharathettu	Rani Akka	Mazhavil Manorama		
2020	Suryakanthi	Rani	Mazhavil Manorama		
2021–2022	Ente Maathavu	Susan	Surya TV		
2023	Madhanakamarajan	Kamini	YouTube	web serial	
2023	Wife is Beautiful	Sara	Zee Keralam		
2024–present	Super Kanmani	Dhanalakshmi	Mazhavil Manorama		
2025–2026	Happy Couples	Athira	Asianet		

=== As host ===
- Telephone Moneyphone (Asianet Plus)

=== Other TV shows ===
- Ningalkkum Aakaam Kodeeshwaran (Asianet)
- Sell Me the Answer (Asianet)
- Run Baby Run (Asianet)
- Smart Show (Flowers TV)
- Kuttykalavara (Flowers TV)
- Deal or No Deal (Surya TV)
- Tamar Padar (Flowers TV)
- Aswamedham (Kairali TV)
- Boeing Boeing (Zee Keralam)
- Jollywood Show (Kairali TV)
- Suryajodi (Surya TV)
- Urvashi Theatres (Asianet)
- Onnum Onnum Moonu (Mazhavil Manorama)
- Oru Kodi (Flowers TV)
- Star Magic (Flowers TV)
- Start Music season 5 (Asianet)
- Enkile Ennodu Para (Asianet)

=== Films ===
Year	Title	Role	Notes
2008	Jubilee	Sicily	Debut movie
2008	Kabadi Kabadi	Meenakshi	
2009	Kappal Muthalaali	Aswathy	
2009	Kerala Cafe	Passenger	Segment:Puram Kazhchakal
2010	Aathmakatha	Seleena	
2010	Nanthuni	Manikutty	
2010	Hide N' Seek	Lathasri	
2013	Romans	Gracy	Breakthrough role
2014	Happy Journey	Film actress	Archive footage
2014	Testpaper		
2016	Calling Bell	Lead	
2023	Chandramukhi 2	Vennila	

== Awards ==
Award	Year	Category	Serial/Film	Results
Kerala State Television Awards	2020	Second Best Actress	Aksharathettu	Won
Asianet Television Awards	2014	Best Actress in a negative role	chandana mazha	Nominated
Asianet Television Awards	2014	Special jury	chandana mazha	Won
Asianet Television Awards	2015	Best Actress in a negative role	chandana mazha	Won
