= Sarvopari Palakkaran =

- Directed by: Venugopan
- Written by: S Suresh Babu
- Screenplay by: S Suresh Babu
- Produced by: Adv. Aji Jose Amaris Cherpunkal
- Starring: Anoop Menon; Aparna Balamurali; Anu Sithara; Gayatri Arun; Mamitha Baiju
- Cinematography: Alby
- Edited by: Vinod Sukumaran
- Music by: Bijibal
- Production company: Rubigs Movies
- Release date: 4 August 2017
- Country: India
- Language: Malayalam

Sarvopari Palakkaran is a 2017 Malayalam film directed by Venugopan. The film features Anoop Menon, Aparna Balamurali and Anu Sithara in the lead roles.

== Plot ==
Jose Mani Chacko Kaithaparambil is from Pala but works as a Circle-Inspector of Police in Thrissur. He is engaged to a college-going student Linda. Being a man with cultural values, and a traditional type. While his father who is a bar manager and friend Joymon try to ensure that Linta is the perfect match for Jose. A Bangladeshi lady, Naina, who was kept in custody and severely molested by Mani Swami, somehow manages to escape and reach the police. Police then starts their hunt for Mani Swami. However, Mani Swami cleverly escapes leaving the black mark on the police. Naina was placed in a shelter home and there she spends her time in painting and writing poems.

Anupama is a social worker and drama artist. Jose happens to see Anupama walking alone to her hostel at midnight 12:30 a.m on the road and stops her. Though she insisted that she will walk to her hostel, Jose stops her. When an auto comes, she refrains to enter the auto citing the reason that the auto driver is a stranger. This enrages Jose and he puts her into police custody. When his sub-ordinates at the police station identifies Anupama as the one who created news during the "Kiss of Love" protest, they suggest Jose to free her, as keeping her in custody will create more problems in the morning. Anupama firmly says that she has to be dropped at the hostel by Jose. When SI Rameshan persuades, Jose agrees and drops her at her P.G. Mani Swami again lands in Thrissur, however he attacks and injures a police officer and escapes. Besides running behind Mani Swami, Jose and Anupama meet in various circumstances, and once Jose even takes her into custody for immoral traffic. This became a social issue, and Jose was suspended by ACP Chandra Sivakumar for creating such a problem. He was also taken off from Naina's case. But as time passes by Jose and Anupama become closer. Mani Swami still carries out his process of transporting young girls to other countries.

Chandra calls Jose for a personal meeting at her flat. Jose uses the opportunity to invite her to his wedding with Linta. He was shocked to hear that Anupama has had phone calls with Mani Swami. After being reassigned to Naina's case to trap Mani, Jose follows Anupama to Goa, where he realizes she is meeting with Mani. Anupama talks to Mani and claims she wants in on the prostitution ring, and when they meet later that night, Mani tries to seduce Anupama, only for Anupama to reveal that he is her father. A shocked Mani Swami begs for her forgiveness, as Jose and the police arrive to arrest him. Later, Anupama reveals to Jose that she has feelings for him. She gives him one last hug and boards a bus while Jose, who's still engaged to Linda, stares lovingly as she rides away.

== Cast ==
- Anoop Menon as CI Jose Mani Chacko Kaithaparambil
- Aparna Balamurali as Anupama Neelakantan
- Anu Sithara as Linta Jose
- Gayatri Arun as ACP Chandra Sivakumar IPS
- Mamitha Baiju as Raji
- Vijayakumar
- Chali Pala as SI Rameshkumar
- Nandu as Mani Swami
- Manju Satheesh
- Balu Varghese as Joymon
- Alencier Ley Lopez as Mani Chacko
- Roshan Basheer
- Manuraj as SI Paulose
- Manju Sunichen as CPO Nimmi
- Nithin Susheel
- Reneesha Rahiman
- Anoop Krishnan as Heroine's friend
- Vindhuja Vikraman
- Sadhika Venugopal as Naina

== Production ==
Anoop Menon signed into play the male lead along with Miya George and Honey Rose. Nandu signed into play the main antagonist role. Television actress Gayatri Arun who is well known for portraying police officer in TV series Parasparam signed into play an important character which is also a police officer role will mark her debut in Malayalam Cinema along with Mamitha Baiju, who is playing a minor role.

In late 2016, Aparna Balamurali replaced Honey Rose and Anu Sithara replaced the Miya George citing date issues.

== Reception ==
The Times of India rated the film with 2.5 stars, saying the film doesn't live up to its premise.
