= Aattakatha (2013 film) =

2013 film

- Directed by: Kannan Perumudiyoor
- Screenplay by: Kannan Perumudiyoor
- Based on: Cholliyattam by Kannan Perumudiyoor
- Starring: Vineeth; Meera Nandan; Eereena; Malavika Wales
- Music by: Mohan Sithara
- Production company: Harisri Films International
- Distributed by: Mahadeva Cinemas
- Release date: 24 May 2013
- Country: India
- Language: Malayalam

Aattakatha: The Final Rehearsal is a 2013 Malayalam-language musical romance film written and directed by Kannan Perumudiyoor. The film marks his directorial debut and is based on his own novel Cholliyattam. He had earlier produced films such as Ee Puzhayum Kadannu (1996) and Nakshatratharattu (1998). Set in the background of thakajam, Aattakatha depicts the power of dance which crosses boundaries.

The film has six songs composed by the late acclaimed tunemaker Raveendran and penned by late poet Gireesh Puthenchery. A long delayed project, it released on 24 May 2013.

== Plot ==
The main plot of the film involves a French woman, played by German actor Irina Jacobi, who comes to Kerala to study Kathakali, and her relationship with a Kathakali artist called Unni.

== Cast ==
- Vineeth as Unni
- Meera Nandan as Sethulakshmi
- Eereena as the French woman
- Malavika Wales as Meleena
- Raghavan as Unni's Father
- Shivaji Guruvayoor as Sekharan Nair
- Kalamandalam Gopi
- Kalashala Babu as Ravunni Nair
- Madampu Kunjukuttan
- Kalaranjini
