= Aavani Thingal =

- Directed by: Harikrishna
- Written by: Harikrishna
- Produced by: P. Rajaram Reddy
- Starring: Subramanian Gopalakrishnan; Tejini; Mathisha
- Cinematography: Vetha Selvam
- Edited by: M. Sankar; K. Idris
- Music by: R. Shankar
- Production company: Rayar Films International
- Release date: 17 November 2006
- Running time: 145 minutes
- Country: India
- Language: Tamil

Aavani Thingal (transl. Aavani Monday) is a 2006 Indian Tamil language romantic drama film directed by Harikrishna. The film stars newcomers Subramanian Gopalakrishnan, Tejini and Mathisha, with Livingston, Kadhal Sukumar, Delhi Kumar, Ajay Rathnam, Ramkumar, Lavanya and Sundari playing supporting roles. It was released on 17 November 2006.

== Plot ==
In a remote village, Rasappa is an orphan who works as a servant in the house of the local bigwig Periyavar. Rasappa wants to get married and his friend Singamuthu recommends him to meet Ponnusamy. Ponnusamy is a marriage broker who had failed to arrange the marriage of his three elder daughters and they all eloped with their boyfriends. Gayathri is Ponnusamy's daughter and her mother Saroja wants her to have an arranged marriage. In the meantime, Periyavar's granddaughter Deepika, a modern city woman, comes to the village after her engagement to live in her grandfather's house. Soon, Rasappa and Deepika have a misunderstanding and they start to quarrel for every small thing. Rasappa who falls in love with Gayathri asks her parents to give their daughter in marriage but her mother Saroja refuses and humiliates him. The heartbroken Rasappa finally understands that without money no one will be interested in giving their daughter in marriage. To earn more money, Rasappa takes up a high-risk job as a bomb-setter for drilling wells. Rasappa soon becomes wealthy thanks to his hard work.

Gayathri's parents eventually accept to give their daughter in marriage. One week before the marriage, Rasappa has a severe accident while setting a bomb in a well because of the naughty behaviour of Deepika. Rasappa survived the explosion but has lost his right arm, therefore, the marriage is cancelled. Feeling guilty for what happened to Rasappa, Deepika decides to help him to find a bride. After many failed attempts, they find the beautiful Rasathi who accepts to marry Rasappa despite being an amputee man. The day before the marriage, Rasappa finds out that Rasathi is a fraud who had married many men before and eloped on the very next day with their valuable belongings. He decides to not call off the marriage. Deepika who is aware of the situation asks Rasappa to marry her the next morning at the village temple in secret. The next morning, Rasappa comes to the temple and refuses to marry Deepika. To Deepika's surprise, Gayathri and her family come to the temple. Gayathri tells Deepika that she fell in love with Rasappa after the betrothal. Her parents say that Rasappa is a gem of a person and are willing to give him their daughter in marriage. The film ends with Rasappa and Gayathri getting married.

== Cast ==
- Subramanian Gopalakrishnan as Rasappa
- Tejini as Deepika
- Mathisha as Gayathri
- Livingston as Ponnusamy
- Kadhal Sukumar as Singamuthu
- Delhi Kumar as Periyavar
- Ajay Rathnam as Deepika's father
- Ramkumar as Janakiraman
- Lavanya as Rasathi
- Sundari as Saroja, Ponnusamy's wife
- Sempuli Jagan as Periyavar's aid
- Suryakanth as Vedi Veerasamy
- Sangeetha Balan as Rasathi's mother
- Viji Ketti as Deepika's mother
- Chelladurai as Madasamy
- Vellai Subbaiah as Astrologer
- Amirtha Ganesh
- Selvakumar as Rasathi's father
- Krishnakanth
- Pallu Babu
- Selvam

== Soundtrack ==
Aavani Thingal

Soundtrack album by R. Shankar
- Released: 2006
- Recorded: 2006
- Genre: Feature film soundtrack
- Length: 27:50
- Label: Mass Audios
- Producer: R. Shankar

The film score and the soundtrack were composed by R. Shankar. The soundtrack features 6 tracks.

Tracklist
No.	Title	Lyrics	Singer(s)	Length
1.	"Edho Iru Vizhi"	Thamizh Nadan	Srinivas, Kalaiselvi	6:17
2.	"Pattanathu"	Snehan	Pushpavanam Kuppusamy	3:14
3.	"Koottukkulle"	Kanna Balan	P. Unnikrishnan, K. S. Chithra	4:23
4.	"En Usira Thottu"	Parithi	Harish Raghavendra	5:08
5.	"Ezhuthatha"	P. Vijay	Aasai Thambi	4:28
6.	"Thindukkallu Poottu"	Vimalan	Grace Karunas	4:20
Total length:				27:50

== Reception ==
Malini Mannath of Chennai Online wrote that "The debutant director has attempted to give a clean, wholesome entertainer sans violence or overt glamour. The scenes have a natural build-up, and the narration is steady paced, though a bit leisurely at times".
