= Innanu Aa Kalyanam =

- Directed by: Rajasenan
- Screenplay by: Rajasenan; Baharuddin
- Story by: Rajasenan
- Produced by: Geevarghese Yohannan
- Starring: Rejith Menon; Saranya Mohan; Malavika Wales
- Cinematography: Vinod Illampilly
- Edited by: Raja Mohammad
- Music by: S. P. Venkatesh
- Distributed by: Maxlab Release SNK Playmore
- Release date: 2 December 2011
- Country: India
- Language: Malayalam

Innanu Aa Kalyanam is a 2011 Indian Malayalam drama film directed by Rajasenan, starring Rejith Menon, Malavika Wales and Saranya Mohan.

== Plot ==
This film is about two friends – Neelima and Aisha, both engineering students of a college. Karthik is a student in the same college. He comes from a poor family. How he and Kunjumon, who also studies in the same college, influence the lives of Neelima and Aisha is the main plot of the film. Neelima, the daughter of a rich man and Aisha, a girl from a middle-class family are best friends since childhood. Neelima falls in love with Karthik owing to his simple and hardworking nature. She helps him in various ways, like providing monetary helps, through Aisha and Karthik feels connected to the latter thinking that it is she who is helping him. On the event of Valentine's Day, Neelima writes a letter to Karthik. Kunjumon who had seen her write the letter, gets angry that she chose Karthik; on the other hand, Karthik misunderstands that Aisha wrote the letter.

One thing leads to the other and in order to prevent Karthik from going further with his feelings for her, Aisha decides to marry, Shameer, a rich businessman, an alliance brought by Neelima's father. Neelima's marriage is fixed with Krishnankutty, aka Chris, an NRI citizen but he is exposed as he has a wife and a child. Karthik learns of how Neelima was the girl who helped him and talks to her openly.

Kunjumon and his family put forward a marriage proposal and Neelima's family accepts it, fearing societal pressure. Kunjumon also blackmails Aisha showing her a clip of her bathing. On the day of marriage, Shameer teaches Kunjumon a lesson by beating him up for misbehaving with Neelima and Aisha and he runs away. Neelima also elope with Karthik. In the end, Neelima calls her family and informs that she wants to get married with their blessings and her family accepts it happily.

== Cast ==
- Rejith Menon as Karthik
- Saranya Mohan as Aisha
- Malavika Wales as Neelima
- Sai Kumar as Sulochanan Pillai, Neelima's father
- Jagathy Sreekumar as Sundaresan, Kunjomon's father
- Rohini as Lillykutty, Neelima's mother
- Bindu Panicker as Susheela, Kunjumon's mother
- Maniyanpilla Raju as Kuttichan, Sulochanan's secretary
- Suraj Venjaramoodu as Ganapati Iyer, principal of the college
- Roshan Basheer as Kunjumon
- Ashokan as Krishnankutty (Chris)
- Kunchan as Chris's father
- Sudheesh as Shameer, Aisha's fiancee
- Mammukoya as a marriage broker
- Indrans as a staff of the college

== Soundtrack ==
No.	Title	Performer(s)	Length
1.	"Oru Pole"	Sudeep Kumar, Rajalakshmi
2.	"Kallipenne"	Arun, Sayanora
3.	"Daffmuttum"	Ravi Shankar, Swetha Mohan
