= G. S. Pradeep =

Indian television personality (born 1972)

Dr. G. S. Pradeep
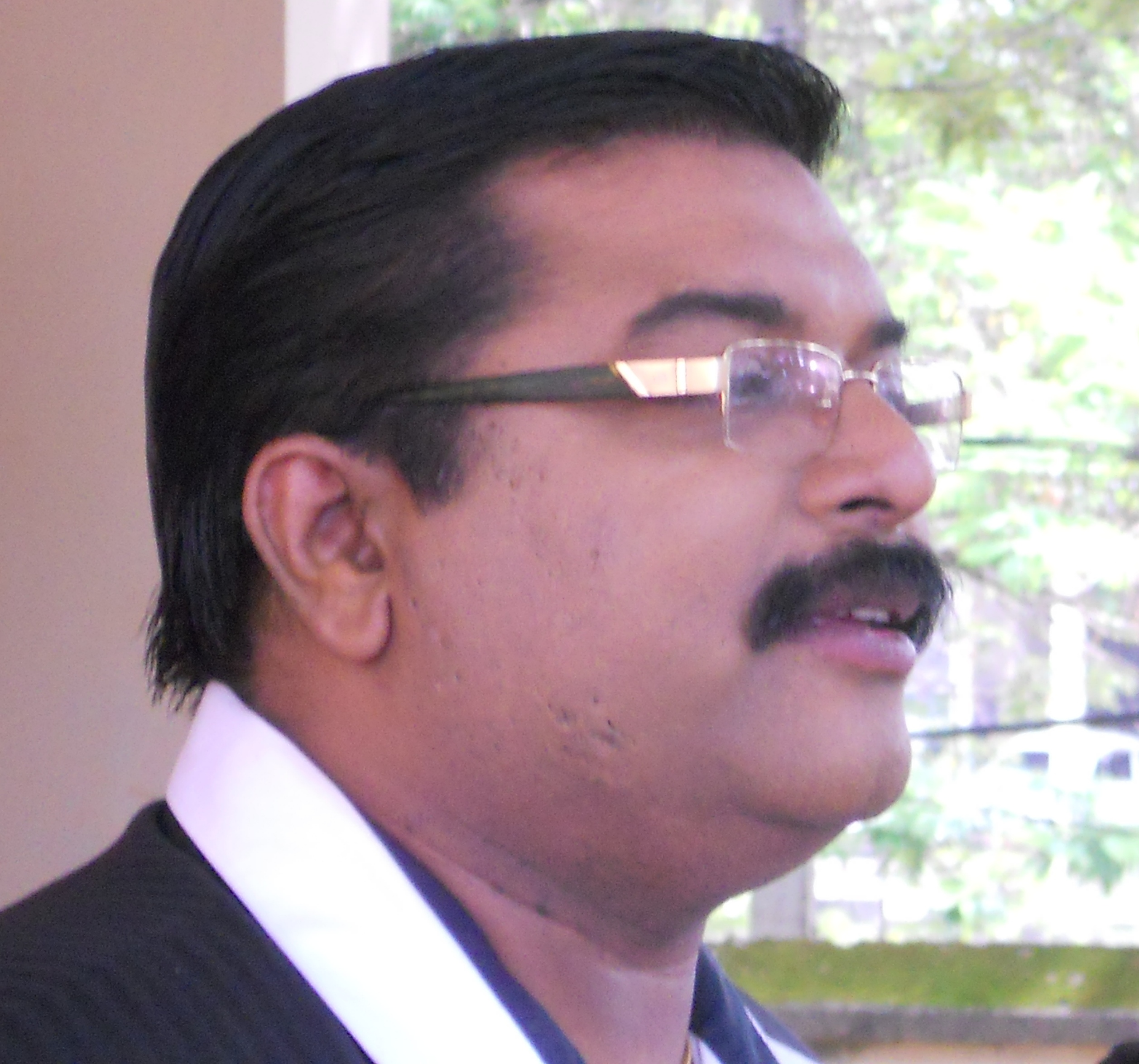
- Born: 15 May 1972 (age 53); Kilimanoor, Thiruvananthapuram, Kerala, India
- Other names: Appu
- Years active: 1987 - present
- Known for: Reverse Quiz, Aswamedham
- Spouse: Bindu Pradeep
- Children: 2
- Parents: P. K. Gangadharan Pillai; Soudamini Thankachi

Gangadharanpillai Soudaminithankachi Pradeep (born 15 May 1972) is an Indian television personality and a public intellectual.

== Personal life ==
He was born to retired headmaster Late P. K. Gangadharan Pillai and Late Soudamini Thankachi. He is most notable for appearing on Aswamedham, being featured in the Limca Book of Records. He is also notable for appearance in program named Oru Nimisham aired by All India Radio (Aakashavani). He is also a state level carrom player and the author of 8 books. He was a contestant in the reality show 'Malayalee House' aired in Surya TV which as he confessed later, was one of the worst ventures he ever took in life. He has also directed a film, Swarna Malsyangal.

== Television ==
=== As Host ===
| Year | Title | Channel | Language | Notes |
|---|---|---|---|---|
| 2000 | Aswamedham | Kairali TV | Malayalam | |
| 2002 | Padayottam | Kairali TV | Malayalam | |
| 2005 - 2006 | Aswamedham | Kairali TV | Malayalam | |
| 2005 | Grandmaster Show titled "Yaaru Manasila Yaaru" | Star Vijay | Tamil | |
| 2007 | Grandmaster | Shakthi TV | Sinhala / Tamil | Srilankan show |
| 2007 | Grandmaster | Shakthi TV | Sinhala | Singapore & Malaysia show |
| 2009 | Rananganam | Jaihind TV | Malayalam | |
| 2009 | DSF Super Family show | Surya TV | Malayalam | UAE Show |
| 2010 | Grandmaster | Sakshi TV | Telugu | |
| 2010 | Panchathanthiram | Mega TV | Tamil | |
| 2011 | Grandmaster in Middle East | Moon TV | Tamil/Arabic/English | UAE show |
| 2012 | Vachakaraja | Surya TV | Malayalam | |
| 2015 | Aswamedham | Kairali TV | Malayalam | |
| 2016 | Master Brain | Janam TV | Malayalam | |
| 2018 - 2019 | Aswamedham | Kairali TV | Malayalam | |
| 2019 - 2020 | Vallavanukku Vallavan | Vasantham TV htc | Tamil | |
| 2024–present | Aswamedham | Kairali TV | Malayalam | |

=== Other shows ===
Malayalam

- Oru Kodi as Participant
- Manyamahajanagale as Judge
- Comedy Stars season 2 as celebrity judge
- Yours truly as Guest
- Charithram enniloode as Guest
- Comedy Super Night 2 as Guest
- Ente Deivam as Guest
- Oru Nimisham as Participant
- Onnum Onnum Moonu as Guest
- Manassil Oru Mazhavillu as Guest
- Malayalee House as Participant

== Filmography ==
- Varum Varunnu Vannu (2003)
- Swarna Malsyangal (2019) as Director
