= Sindhu Joy =

Indian politician

Dr. Sindhu Joy Santimon
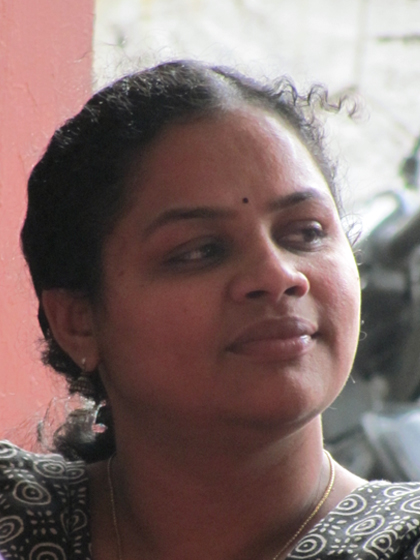
- Activist and Former politician

Personal details
- Born: Ernakulam, Kerala India
- Party: Indian National Congress
- Spouse: Santimon Jacob (m. 2017)
- Parents: George Joseph Chakkungal; Laila Joseph Veeramana
- Education: Maharaja's College University of Kerala
- Known for: Political activities

Sindhu Joy is an Indian former politician from the state of Kerala. She has served as the Chairperson of the Kerala State Youth Commission, National Vice President of Students Federation India, and President of the SFI Kerala State Committee. In 2011, she resigned from CPI-M and joined the Congress party. In 2013, she appeared on Malayalee House.

== Career and activism ==
Sindhu Joy was the All India Vice-President of Students' Federation of India and the president of SFI Kerala State committee for three years.

In 2006, Joy unsuccessfully contested in the Legislative Assembly election as a Left Democratic Front (Kerala) candidate against the then Chief Minister of Kerala Oommen Chandy from the Puthuppally constituency. Prior to the elections she was arrested on old charges. During the campaign, she was promoted as "the symbol of the UDF government's use of force to suppress students' stir against privatisation of the education sector." She lost by 19863 votes.

She also unsuccessfully contested in the Parliament elections against K. V. Thomas, a former union minister, in the 2009 Lok Sabha elections from Ernakulam Constituency. She lost by about 11,000 votes.

Joy was nominated as the first chairperson of Kerala State Youth Commission. As an active politician, she has held various positions, including:

- Chairperson, Kerala State Youth Commission.
- National Vice President, Students Federation India.
- President, SFI Kerala State Committee

In 2011, Joy resigned from CPI-M, stating she had been "neglected" by the party. She joined the Congress party in 2011. In 2013, Joy joined Surya TV as a news presenter. In 2014, after participating in the Malayalam reality show, Malayalee House, Joy announced she would return to politics, but did not say which party she would join.

== Education ==
Joy completed a PhD in political science from the University of Kerala in 2009, having begun her research in 2003 after completing her MPhil at the University of Kerala. When she was finishing her thesis in 2006, she was jailed for 24 days on charges connected to a mass protest.

== Personal life ==
Sindhu Joy is the elder daughter of Late George Joseph Chakkungal (Joy) and Late Laila Joseph Veeramana. She is married to Santimon Jacob. Sindhu Joy has a brother and a sister.
