= Aparna P Nair =

Indian actress (1989–2023)

Aparna P. Nair
- Born: 30 November 1989; Kerala, India
- Died: 31 August 2023 (aged 33); Karamana, Kerala, India
- Occupation: Actress
- Years active: 2009–2023
- Children: 2

Aparna P. Nair (30 November 1989 – 31 August 2023) was an Indian actress, who primarily appeared in Malayalam television serials.

== Career ==
Aparna was mostly known for her roles in television serials like Chandanamazha, Athmasakhi, Mythili Veendum Varunnu, and Devasparsham. She also acted in films like Meghatheertham, Muddugau, Achayans, and Kodathi Samaksham Balan Vakeel.

== Personal life and death ==
Aparna was married and had two daughters.

On 31 August 2023, Aparna died by suicide, at the age of 33. Her body was found hanging in her room.

== Filmography ==
Film
Year	Film	Notes	Ref.
2009	Meghatheertham	Debut film	
2016	Mudhugauv		
2017	Mythily Veendum Varunnu		
2017	Achayans		
2017	Neeranjana Pookkal		
2018	Devasparsham		
2018	Pen Masala		
2019	Kodathi Samaksham Balan Vakeel		
2019	British Bungalow		
2019	Nalla Vishesham		
2022	Kadalu Paranja Kadha		

Television
Years	TV series	Channel	Ref.
2014–18	Chandanamazha	Asianet	
2016–18	Athmasakhi	Mazhavil Manorama	
2021–22	Sasneham	Asianet	
