= Eby J. Jose =

Indian journalist and activist

- Born: 28 March 1972 (age 54)
- Occupations: Journalist, human rights activist
- Spouse: Sindhu
- Children: Liya Maria, Diya Ann, Evana Elza, Joseph Kurian and Catherine Rebecca

Eby J. Jose (born 28 March 1972) is a journalist and human rights activist from Kizhathadiyoor village, Pala, Kottayam District in Kerala, India. His wife Sindhu is an employee at the LSG department and he is the father of five children – Liya Maria, Diya Ann, Evana Elza, Joseph Kurian and Catherine Rebecca. Eby J. Jose is the son of Pala Moolayilthottathil Baby Joseph and Ammini.

== History ==
Eby Jose has been an activist for 21 years and raised campaigns for social issues.

"None of us are bothered about our responsibilities to the Indian Constitution though we are fond of making incessant lectures on the merits and demerits of the Constitution", says Eby.

Eby has initiated several legal battles to protect the basic principles of Indian Constitution, using media to create awareness among people on the responsibilities of a citizen to our Constitution. He organised many such movements, both successful and unsuccessful.

=== Credentials ===
A student politician-turned-journalist and social worker, Eby has to his credit the titles of several magazines like Pala Times, Kera Sabdam, Information Today, India Monitor and Dil Se. At present, he is editing the monthly Gulf Life. Eby has affiliated himself with the National Unity Front, Rajiv Gandhi Peace Foundation, Catholic Youth Council of India, Cheriyan J. Kappan Foundation, and the Anti Narcotic Movement of India and Small-Scale Farmers' Federation.

When the film stars in Kerala formed an organisation called 'AMMA', in retaliation Eby formed an organisation of viewers called 'AMMAYI'.

He is now serving as the chairman of Mahatma Gandhi National Foundation.

=== Political activism ===
==== Fight against vices ====
Eby had a role in the campaigns against drugs, pan masala, and single digit lottery in Kottayam and Delhi. Additionally, he rose awareness for AIDS in these locations.

==== Stance against Padma award for celebrities ====
The campaign initiated by Eby against awarding Padma honor to film stars and sports stars had invited the attention of national media. Padma awards have been instituted to honor the great sons of India who give rich contribution to the development of the country. We can't include film and cinema stars in these categories. They do their work by accepting handsome remuneration. Many of them do not even pay tax and don't even know the value of a Padma award", says Eby. He had already written to the President of India and Prime Minister requesting not to give Padma award to film and sports personalities in future.

==== Support for Prohibition ====
Eby's protest against a recent liquor advertisement by Padmasree award winner and actor Mohanlal was hot news for national and international media. Prohibition is part of the directive principles listed in Indian Constitution. But, this Padma awardee had acted in a liquor commercial by accepting remuneration worth Crores. We have requested him to refrain from the ad for the sake of morality but of no avail", explains Eby. According to the sections of Prohibition Act – 1950, promoting liquor is a crime. My argument was based on that but he didn't pay heed to it. Even the reports in international media like BBC and CNN could not prevent him from doing that ad, says Eby. Eby wrote to Mohanlal's parents and wife requesting them to correct their beloved. "The government has removed the ads from KSRTC buses and directed to remove the hoardings on road. Now the company displays the same ad for a chips brand. Can you buy the chips manufactured by that company from anywhere in the world?", asks Eby, who vows that he will continue campaigning against the Superstar's anti social policies. He says even Mohanlal's new movie Hello promotes the habit of drinking.

On the contrary, Eby had a sweet experience from the distributors of Rajanikanth's latest movie Sivaji in Kerala. The initial posters of Sivaji carried the ad of a liquor brand. Eby wrote to Johny Sagarika, who had the distribution rights in Kerala and the agency withdrew those posters and issued fresh ones.

Shocking visuals aired by Surya TV years before, portrayed a man being drowned by another in Padmatheertha pond in Thiruvananthapuram. The visual also showed police men and fire force personnel with disgust. Moved by the visuals, Eby wrote a letter to the High Court. Justice Sankara Subban and Justice Lakshmykkutty Amma registered a petition based on that letter. They ordered to give a compensation of Rs. One lakh to the victim's family. It was a rare case, in which one who has no relation to the victim had approached the Court and secured a favourable order.

==== Campaign against Union Ministers ====
Eby is also leading a battle against Union Ministers including the Prime Minister Dr. Manmohan Singh. According to him, these ministers reached the cabinet through the back door, that is through Rajya Sabha, without facing the public directly. He sees this as a bid on the life of democracy. "When a candidate who lost the polls becomes the Minister, the one who had defeated him waits in the queue to meet him. This is irony", explains Eby.

==== Campaign for proper use of the national flag ====
If you ask him which is his masterpiece campaign, Eby will point his finger to a well kept and clean national flag in his room. For the past 15 years, this young man has been engaged in relentless fight to ensure that the tri colour always flown high. "It all started accidentally. Once I got an opportunity to travel with then Minister A.C. Shanmukhadas. In the evening, the driver took the national flag from the bonnet of the car neatly wrapped it and kept inside. I asked what was wrong in keeping it there", says Eby about the birth his most dedicated campaign. Das told him that the national flag could only be used during day time, after the sun rise and before the sun set. That was a new piece of knowledge to him. He began to collect all the details about our national flag like its history and the rules to be followed while using the flag.

His sharp eyes soon began to detect the misuse of national flag in and around. The flags put on tables at the meeting of some social organisations, plastic ones, those with heads down, the flags in which slogans are printed. He collected a number of evidences and approached the High Court with a petition, admitted by then Chief Justice A.R. Lakshman. Four days ahead of our 53rd Independence Day, Justice Radhakrishnan reminded all cititzens about the greatness of the tri color and the code of conduct to be observed while handling the flag. From ace motorist Narain Karthikeyan to the architects of Tamil movie 'Annian'. many careless citizens had to taste Eby's legal notices that are intended to educate them about the national flag. Recently, Babu M. Pallissery MLA withdrew the national flag from his web page after an alert from Eby. The latest errant is the optical firm Essilor India Private Limited. After reading a letter sent by Eby, the company withdrew its advertisement featuring tri colour printed on the eyelids of a model.

He has recently launched a project 'Mission Flag' to create awareness among school children about the National flag. He targets to reach 10000 schools in five-year with this message.

Eby J Jose with Hon'ble President of India Dr. APJ Abdul Kalam (2005)

== Mission Flag Campaign ==
Eby J. Jose have undertaken this nationally important campaign named Mission Flag

The National Flag (flag) is a symbol of the Nation's respect and pride. There is a liberal use of the flag on Independence Day and Republic day. The duty of every individual to maintain proper respect of the National Flag. From this point of view the following dos & donts will prove useful.

Do's and Don'ts

Hoist the Flag at a height in a suitable manner. Do not let small children use the National Flag as a toy. Do not use or buy plastic Flags. Do not use paper Flags to pin up on shirt pockets, etc. Take care to see that the Flag does not get crumpled. Do not use the Flag as a banner or for decoration. Take care to see that the National Flag is not trampled upon or torn. Do not let the Flag fall on the ground. Do not join cloth pieces to resemble the National Flag.

As a part of this campaign:

1. Mahatma Gandhi National Foundation is attempting to educate children in various schools, putting up appeals for display in public places and on notice boards, so also attempting to reach maximum people through the medium of Internet.
2. The Foundation has also appealed to people through the newspapers to implement the above measures.
3. The Foundation has met the President of India and has demanded that strict action be taken in cases of insult to the National Flag.

== Guideline for Disposal of Damaged Flag ==
When the Flag is in a damaged or soiled condition, it shall be destroyed as a whole in private, preferably by burning or by any other method consistent with the dignity of the Flag. – Flag Code of India 2002, Section II, Point 2.2 (xiii). See also: Flag code of India

From this point of view obey the following measures

1. Hoist National Flag on a height in proper manner.
2. Do not let small children use National Flag as toys.
3. Do not use or purchase plastic flag.

== School of rights and duties ==
Eby J. Jose has proposed to set up a free school to instruct citizens on the rights guaranteed by the Constitution and their duties to the nation. Named as "School of rights and duties", the facility would offer three-month courses to the candidates on the rights guaranteed to them by the Constitution and the duties expected of them as responsible citizens.

A study conducted by Mahatma Gandhi National Foundation has found that a majority of people are not sufficiently aware of their Constitutional rights. This results in exploitation of the majority by a privileged minority. If citizens are properly instructed of their rights, they could, to a great extent, resist exploitation.

”Similarly, it is important for responsible citizens to be conscious of their duties to the nation. In our formal educational syllabus, these basic issues are often not given due importance. Ours is a modest beginning to overcome these lacunae", Eby J. Jose, director of the venture, said.

Even many of those young persons who choose and already chose political and social careers were not adequately aware of these aspects and this was the cause for lack proper perspective in their approach.

== Published Book ==
Eby J. Jose with K. R. Narayanan, President of India (2002)

Eby J. Jose authored a Malayalam biography of the late president Narayanan, titled K.R.Narayanan Bharathathinte Suryathejassu. The book traces the life, times and political beliefs of the former president.

== Documentary film ==
K R Narayanan Foundation (KRNF) is producing a documentary film (both in Malayalam and English) on the life of K R Narayanan, title THE FOOTPRINTS OF SURVIVAL, aimed at propagating the ideals and perpetuating the memory of K. R. Narayanan. This documentary film will be directed by Mr.Sunny Joseph, a senior journalist. The script would be based on a biography of the late President written by Eby J. Jose, who is also General Secretary of the K R Narayanan Foundation. The Foundation has planned to distribute the DVD copies of the creative work to all schools, colleges and public libraries.
