= Kalyanamam Kalyanam (TV series) =

- Genre: Soap opera Family
- Written by: Jama; Piraven Raj
- Directed by: Bramma G. Dev (episodes 1–170) & (241-307); R. Ganesh (episodes 171-240)
- Starring: Sreethu Krishnan; Tejas Gowda; Pragya Nagra; Subramanian Gopalakrishnan; Srithika; T. S. B. K. Moulee; R. Sundarrajan
- Theme music composer: N. Kannan
- Country of origin: India
- Original language: Tamil
- No. of seasons: 2
- No. of episodes: 500+

Production
- Producers: V. K. Amirtharaj (episodes 1–200); S. Anand Babu (episodes 200–307)
- Editor: P. Arunkumar
- Camera setup: Multi-camera
- Running time: approx. 22–24 minutes per episode

Original release
- Network: Vijay TV
- Release: 29 January 2018 – 23 February 2019

Kalyanamam Kalyanam (lit. Marriage Like Marriage) is a Tamil-language family soap opera initially started with Sreethu Krishnan and Tejas Gowda in the lead but later replaced by Pragya Nagra and Subramanian Gopalakrishnan. Whilst Srithika, T. S. B. K. Moulee and R. Sundarrajan in the supporting roles. It started airing on 29 January 2018 on Vijay TV The show is directed by Bramma. The plot and names were partly inspired from the Tamil movie Kadhal Kottai. A sequel series named Anjali premiered on 25 February 2019, replacing this series.

== Plot ==
The story starts with introduction of Kamali and Suriya. They both have two different worlds. Kamali living in Kothagiri, wants to get married and live her life happily with her husband full of love just like her parents, while Suriya in Chennai thinks marriage is just one more burden in life which will only hurt people's life based on his experience in his parents' divorced life. Suriya's grandfather Siva wants him to marry and looks for alliance and wants him and his parents to meet Kamali. Suriya and his parents arrive at Kamali's home. Suriya asks Kamali about divorce in their first talk. This creates bad impression of Suriya among her family members.

== Cast ==
=== Main ===
- Tejas Gowda (Ep: 1-301) / Subramanian Gopalakrishnan (Ep: 302-307) as Suriya
- Sreethu Krishnan (Ep: 1-301) / Pragya Nagra (Ep: 302-307) as Kamali
- Niharika (Ep: 1-68) / Sri Rithika (Ep: 69-210) / Sailatha (Ep: 211-307) as Akhila, Suriya's mother

=== Supporting ===
- T. S. B. K. Moulee as Sivaprakasham - Surya and Madhan's grandfather and Akhila, Jagadish and Sandhya's father
- R. Sundarrajan as Kamali's grandfather
- Jeeva Ravi / Prakash Rajan as Dr. Chandrasekhar, Suriya's father
- Shabnam as Priya, Kamali's cousin
- Premi Venkat as Priya's mother in law
- VJ Vishal as Gaurav
- Baby George as Kalyani (Priya's mother, Kamali's aunt)
- Sai Priyanka Ruth as Sandhya. Akhila's sister and Surya's aunt
- Jeevitha as Nirmala Jagadish
- --- as Jagadish (Nirmala's husband)
- Gokul Menon as Madhan (Nirmala's son)
- Aishwarya Salimath as Swetha Madhan (Madhan's wife)
- Uma Rani as 'Pookadai' Bhuvana (Swetha's mother)
- Ravikumar
- Sripriya as Thenmozhi (Kamali's mother)
- Bharathi Mohan as Kamali's uncle
- Mridhula Sree

== Casting ==
The series is a family story. Sreethu Krishnan, formerly of the series 7C and Mella Thirandhathu Kadhavu played the lead female role but later Pragya Nagra replaced her for its sequel series. Teja who made his debut in the Kannada film One Time, played the male lead role of Suriya, later to be replaced by Subramanian Gopalakrishnan for its sequel series. Tamil Film director and Actors T. S. B. K. Moulee and R. Sundarrajan are also part of the serial and play important roles.

== Title song ==
=== Soundtrack ===
Track list
No.	Title	Music	Length
1.	"Thulli Thulli (துள்ளி துள்ளி) Title Song"	N. Kannan	2:16
