= Nandeesha =

2012 Kannada-language film

- Directed by: Om Sai Prakash
- Produced by: Anasuya Komal Kumar
- Starring: Komal Kumar; Parul Yadav; Malavika Wales
- Cinematography: Selvam
- Edited by: K. M. Prakash
- Music by: Songs: Hamsalekha; Score: Manikanth Kadri
- Production company: Soundarya Lahari Combines
- Release date: 28 December 2012
- Country: India
- Language: Kannada

Nandeesha is a 2012 Indian Kannada-language film directed by Om Sai Prakash, starring Komal Kumar, Parul Yadav and Malavika Wales in the lead roles. The film is a remake of the Malayalam film Thilakkam (2003).

== Cast ==
- Komal Kumar as Nandeesha
- Parul Yadav as Sonia
- Malavika Wales as Kavya
- Neha Bachani
- Srinivasa Murthy as Mantur Nanjundaswamy
- Ramesh Bhat as Hanumanthaiah
- Mimicry Dayanand
- Vijayalakshmi
- Kotresh
- Kuri Prathap

== Music ==
Nandeesha

Soundtrack album by Hamsalekha
- Released: 3 December 2012
- Recorded: 2012
- Genre: Feature film soundtrack
- Length: 19:22
- Language: Kannada

Official audio
- Nandeesha - Full Album on YouTube

Track listing
| No. | Title | Singer(s) | Length |
|---|---|---|---|
| 1. | "Baalu Bandre Byatal Hodi" | Rajesh Krishnan, Chaitra H. G. | 3:50 |
| 2. | "A Aa E Ee" | Badri Prasad | 4:23 |
| 3. | "Dro Dro" | Sunitha, Gururaj Hosakote | 4:14 |
| 4. | "Inthavarige Inthavarendu" | Anuradha Bhat | 4:12 |
| 5. | "Sakkare Panka" | Chinni Charan | 3:23 |
| Total length: | | | 19:22 |

== Reception ==
=== Critical response ===
The Times of India scored the film at 3 out of 5 stars and said, "Komal has done an excellent job as Nandeesha, but disappoints as Vishwa. Malavika scores over Parul in acting. Srinivasamurthy and Ramesh Bhat have done justice to their roles. Music by Hamsalekha is okay. Selvam’s camera work passes muster" Bangalore Mirror wrote "The biggest disappointment in the film is Hamsalekha. Neither his music or lyrics has even a touch of his magic. Has Sandalwood passed by him? In one of the songs, Komal seems to be imitating Ravichandran. His combination with Parul does not recreate Pyarge Aagibittaite. Veterans Srinivas Murthy and Ramesh Bhat stand out with their performances". Srikanth Srinivasa of Rediff.com scored the film at 2.5 out of 5 stars and wrote "Srinivasa Murthy has acted well and so has Ramesh Bhat. The songs are forgettable and the one redeeming feature in the movie is the lush green locations and snowy mountains of Switzerland. Nandisha is a disappointingly mediocre film from an established director". News18 India wrote "Nandeesha fails to entertain the audience mainly because of a poor script and ordinary technical values". Shruti I L of DNA wrote "Nandeesha could have been the perfect grand finale but instead it turns out to be a dampener. This time even Komal fails to entertain!" BS Srivani of Deccan Herald wrote "Veterans Srinivasamurthy and Ramesh Bhat shoulder the entire film. Manikant Kadri’s background score is impressive. Hamsalekha’s music and lyrics are in a zone of their own. Nandeesha disappoints".
