= Kodathi Samaksham Balan Vakeel =

2019 film directed by B. Unnikrishnan

Kodathi Samaksham Balan Vakkeel
- Theatrical release poster
- Directed by: B. Unnikrishnan
- Written by: B. Unnikrishnan
- Produced by: Ajit Andhare; B. Unnikrishnan
- Starring: Dileep; Mamta Mohandas; Priya Anand; Harish Uthaman; Vamsi Krishna
- Cinematography: Akhil George
- Edited by: Shameer Muhammed
- Music by: Songs: Gopi Sundar; Rahul Raj; Score: Gopi Sundar
- Production companies: RD Illuminations; Viacom18 Motion Pictures
- Distributed by: Viacom18 Motion Pictures
- Release date: 21 February 2019
- Running time: 160 minutes
- Country: India
- Language: Malayalam

Kodathi Samaksham Balan Vakkeel (transl. Advocate Balan present before the court) is a 2019 Indian Malayalam-language action comedy film written and directed by B. Unnikrishnan and produced by Viacom18 Motion Pictures. The film stars Dileep in title role, with an ensemble cast of Mamta Mohandas, Priya Anand, Harish Uthaman, Vamsi Krishna, K. B. Ganesh Kumar,Siddique, Suraj Venjaramoodu,Aju Varghese and Saiju Kurup. It follows Balakrishnan, an advocate with a stutter.

This movie was a commercial success at box office.

== Plot ==
A raid takes place on the car of a huge businessman, Ronald. ₹3 crore (US$310,000) is found in the car and taken away by the police.

The story then shifts to Balan, an advocate who hasn't made much in life due to his stutter. He is finally successful in a case that granted bail for his client, Anzar. After Anzar offers a house in a crooked colony for Balan instead of his fees, he is kicked out of the house by Babu. He leaves for his house in his hometown where his father and mother stay. After some unfortunate events, Balan's brother-in-law entrusts him with a complicated case.

Balan solves the case due to his love for Anuradha. The police chief was part of that cash of ₹3 crore (US$310,000) confiscated by police. His nexus with Ronaldo and Tina is filmed by the intelligent father of Anuradha who asks ₹5 crore (US$520,000) but DG gets him killed. Anuradha's father kept the secret in a bank locker. Since he has taught his daughter to solve puzzles, Anuradha helps Balan with major leads in the case, and the rest of the story is how they solve this mystery.

== Cast ==
- Dileep as Adv. Balakrishnan Pillai
- Mamta Mohandas as Anuradha Sudarshan
  - Niveditha as Young Anuradha
- Priya Anand as Teena Shankar, Third Antagonist
- K. B. Ganesh Kumar as ACP Vincent Thomas IPS, Balakrishnan's college senior and advisor
- Aju Varghese as Ansar Ali Khan, Balan's client
- Suraj Venjaramoodu as SI P. Mohanan Pillai, Balakrishnan's brother in law
- Harish Uthaman as Ronald, businessman, Secondary Antagonist
- Vamsi Krishna as ACP Ratnavel IPS, Tamil Nadu Police
- Siddique as Somasekharan Pillai, Balakrishnan's father
- Renji Panicker as DGP K. E. Eappan IPS, The Main Antagonist
- Bheeman Raghu as Irumbu Babu
- Saiju Kurup as Judge Vidhyadharan, Balakrishnan & Vincent's friend
- Bindu Panicker as Vishalam, Balakrishnan's Mother
- Lena as ADGP Indulekha Marar IPS
- Rajesh Sharma as Sudarshan, Anuradha's father
- Veena Nair as Beena
- Thesni Khan as Anuradha's stepmother
- Kottayam Pradeep as Chacko, Court Attender
- Shobha Mohan as Vidhyadharan's mother
- Arjun Nandhakumar as Adv. Pramod
- Sajid Yahiya as Stranger
- Dinesh Panicker as Chief Minister Radhakrishnan
- Uma Nair as Public Prosecutor Adv. Radhika
- Poojappura Radhakrishnan as Tea Shop Owner
- Priyanka as Tea Shop Owner's Wife
- Sharika Menon as Balan's sister
- Nandu Poduwal as Thaddeus
- Aparna P Nair as Lady Seeking Divorce
- Prabhakar as a goon send by Irumbu Babu to attack Balan
- Baby as Colony lady
- Mary as Colony lady
- Neha Iyer as herself in the song "Babuetta"

== Production ==
Unnikrishnan initially visualised the story with Jayaram in mind for Balakrishnan, which he conceived in 2014. When he told the one-line story, Jayaram replaced Dileep would better suit the character. The film was produced by Viacom18 Motion Pictures and marks their debut in Malayalam cinema.

== Music ==
Rahul Raj was initially signed in as the composer. But as the project was pushed to October, he had to opt out after composing two songs, "Then Panimathiye" and "Thaniye Itha" as he had to be in Berklee, Spain. The other two songs, "Babuvetta" and "Onnum Mindaathe", were thus composed by Gopi Sunder

| No. | Title | Singer(s) | Length |
|---|---|---|---|
| 1. | "Then Panimathiye" | K. S. Harisankar |
| 2. | "Onnum Mindathe" | Shashaa Tirupati |
| 3. | "Thaniye Ithaa" | Yazin Nizar |
| 4. | "Babuvetta" | Pravanam Sasi, Sithara Krishnakumar |

== Marketing and release ==
The teaser trailer video of Kodathi Samaksham Balan Vakeel was released on 27 December 2018 and the theatrical trailer on 24 January 2019. The film was released on 21 February 2019.

== Reception ==
=== Box office ===
The film was a commercial success, grossing over ₹25 crore (US$2.6 million) from Kerala. It grossed around $47,728 from the US in its lifetime. It grossed $8,546(NZ$12,484)(₹5.91 lakhs) from New Zealand.

=== Critical response ===
News18 rated 3.5 on a scale of 5 and wrote that the film "blends all the right ingredients of populist cinema and emerges victorious". The New Indian Express critic also rated it 3.5 out of 5 and commented: "The film makes it obvious from early on that it was not designed to provide any sort of intellectual stimulation, and any attempt to seek the same would be an exercise in futility. It's more interested in playing to the gallery and should be approached in the same way as you would any commercial entertainer". The Times of India critic rated 3 out of 5 stars and wrote that it is a "run-of-the-mill thriller made for you to like and be in awe of the hero. It is demanding you to like him and root for him, sometimes out of sympathy and the other times for his intelligence. It is a story entirely revolving around that need to urge you to like him and appreciate his Sherlock-ian intelligence". Sify's critic called it an "average thriller" and rated 2.5 in a scale of 5 and said the film "ends up as an okay one time watch, packaged for those who don't need much to be thrilled".

== Remake ==
In late February 2019, Unnikrishnan said that Viacom is considering remaking the movie and discussions are in the initial stages. We are talking to both Akshay Kumar and Shah Rukh Khan for starring in the movie.
