= Rosin Jolly =

Indian Malayalam actress and TV presenter

- Born: Muvattupuzha, India
- Occupation: Actress
- Years active: 2011–present
- Spouse: Sunil Thomas

Rosin Jolly is a television presenter and an actress in Malayalam cinema.

== Early life ==
Jolly is from Kerala. She was born in Muvattupuzha in the Ernakulam district of the Indian state of Kerala. She completed secondary and college degrees in Bengaluru and is settled there.

== Career ==
Rosin Jolly started her as a dancer and a Television Host in 2011. She anchored shows such as Wedding Bells, Priyasakhi, Love in Canopy, SIIMA film Awards 2014 and Atham Pathu Ruchi.

She acted in two films in 2012 and five films during 2013. In addition to her movie roles, Jolly was a contestant on Malayalee House, a reality show that aired on Surya TV in 2013.She has also acted in many TV advertisements like Zee Kannada, Kanyaka Magazine, Kaumudy TV, Britannia, Amazon Urban Company and Asian Paints. Thamarakannan, Sreeramajapam, Sree Bhadrakali, and Indian Brazuca are her popular albums.

== Television ==
Year	Program	Channel	Role
2013	Malayalee House	Surya TV	Contestant
2013	Sreekandan Nair Show	Surya TV	Participant
2013-2014	Champions	Surya TV	Host
2014	South Indian International Movie Awards	Surya TV	Host/Performer
2014	Love n Canopy	Kairali We	Host
2014	Priyasakhi	Surya TV	Host
2014	Atham Pathu Ruchi	Mazhavil Manorama	Host
2014-2015	Wedding Bells	Kaumudy TV	Host
2015	D2 - D 4 Dance	Mazhavil Manorama	Celebrity performer
2015	Smart Show	Flowers TV	Participant
2015	Onnum Onnum Moonu	Mazhavil Manorama	Guest
2016-2018	Swayamvaram	Kaumudy TV	Host
2017	Dare the Fear	Asianet	Contestant
2018	A Day with Boby Chemmanur	Kaumudy TV	Host
2019	Annie's Kitchen	Amrita TV	Guest
2020	Ramu Kariat Film Awards	Flowers TV	Performer
2024- 2025	Valsalyam	Zee Keralam	Madhuri
	Seethayanam	Zee Keralam	Urmila

== Filmography ==
Year	Title	Role(s)	Notes
2011	Bangkok Summer	Mariya	
2011	Track	Aishwarya	
2011	Steps	-	
2012	Hero	Antony's friend	
2012	Suzhal	Kaveri	Tamil film
2013	Annum Innum Ennum	Daisy	
2013	Ms. Lekha Tharoor Kanunnathu	Veni	
2013	Entry	Sona	
2013	One	Rosin	
2013	Kallapetty	Kanimozhi	Tamil film
2015	Aval Vannathinu Shesham	Leena	
2015	Mayapuri 3D	Adhi's mother	
2016	Marubhoomiyile Aana	Malar	
2016	Swarna Kaduva	Mollykutty	
2017	Gemini	Nancy	
2017	Gandhinagaril Unniyarcha	Rani	
2018	Pattinapakkam	Malini	Tamil film
2018	Vikadakumaran	Aishwarya Nair	
2018	Kamuki	Lakshmi	
2022	Paappan	Ravi Varman's wife	
2025	Mr & Mrs Bachelor	Aiswarya	
