= Ennalum Ente Aliya =

2023 Malayalam film

- Theatrical release poster
- Directed by: Bash Mohammed
- Screenplay by: Bash Mohammed; Sreekumar Arackal
- Produced by: Kaarthekeyen Santhanam; Listin Stephen
- Starring: Suraj Venjaramoodu; Gayatri Arun; Siddique; Lenaa
- Cinematography: Prakash Velayudhan
- Edited by: Manoj
- Music by: Shaan Rahman; William Francis
- Production company: Magic Frames
- Release date: 6 January 2023
- Country: India
- Language: Malayalam

Ennalum Ente Aliya is a 2023 Indian Malayalam-language comedy drama film directed by Bash Mohammed and produced by Listin Stephen under the banner Magic Frames . It features Suraj Venjaramoodu, Gayatri Arun, Siddique and Lenaa in lead roles. The film was released on 6 January 2023.

== Plot ==
The story takes place in Dubai. Balu, an insurance agent, and Lakshmi are a childless couple. Balu has many issues due to his work pressure, but he lives happily with Lakshmi. Lakshmi's brother Vivek comes over to stay. Balu is totally angry towards Vivek as he is lazy with his lifestyle. Another family lives in the same society in another wing; Kareem, a small time construction site head, his wife Sulu with their only daughter Ismi. Sulu always says that whatever happens Ismi should marry someone of their community.

On Ismi's friend, Jesna's mehndi, Ismi says that she can't go due to a headache. They later learn that Jesna eloped with an unknown guy. When they come back, Sulu suspects that Ismi has an affair with Vivek, when she sees the name "Customer care" and "Vicks" on her phone. The next day, on Vivek's birthday, Kareem and Sulu go to Balu's house to have a talk thinking that Vivek is Balu's and Lakshmi's son. In absence of Vivek. both the couples gets into an argument in which, Sulu inadvertently hurts Lakshmi by saying that being a childless couple, which they half resolve and come to good terms with each other. In between all this Vivek sends 3 of his friends to Balu's place saying they eloped together. Kareem recognises one of the girls as Jesna but Balu sends them back. Kareem and Balu also drink. Vivek comes home and clears things with Sulu saying that he and Ismi studied together in Kerala and that they are best friends. Then, a drunk Kareem misbehaves with Balu and creates a mess at the house. Afterwards, Sulu and Kareem goes back to their house. When they return, they see Vivek and Ismi talking to each other. They call Balu. Then Vivek clears everything: the friends were planning to celebrate Vivek's birthday, Vivek and Ismi are just friends, Jesna eloped with Vivek and that Ismi is actually in love with Omar, a Saudi-African boy. Vivek says that Omar was the "Customer call" on Ismi's phone. Hearing this Sulu faints.

During Ismi's marriage, Sulu is sitting a little far to show her disapproval. Balu and Lakshmi walk up to her and Balu says that she doesn't have to fall in this trap of what people think because we all will die one day, that we should live our lives and move on. After the marriage function, Balu and Lakshmi goes back to their house where Balu cuts of the calling bell wire and goes happily to Lakshmi.

== Cast ==
- Suraj Venjaramoodu as Balakrishnan (Balu)
- Siddique as Abdul Karim
- Gayatri Arun as Lakshmi
- Lena as Sulfi (Sulu)
- Meera Nandan as Jesna
- Sudheer Paravoor as Hydrose Thunjanparambil
- Amritha Menon as Ismi
- Josekutty Jacob as Vivek
- Bernad Anerti Abe as Omar
- Raj Babu as Salam

== Production ==
The first look of the film was released in November 2022. Later, teaser released and the Production company announced the release date 6 January 2023.

== Release ==
The film released in theatres on 6 January 2023. The digital rights of the film is acquired by Amazon Prime Video and started streaming from 3 February 2023.

== Reception ==
=== Critical reception ===
A critic from Samayam gave 3.5 stars out of 5 and noted that, "Second part is very interesting and goes ahead." Dhanya K. Vilayil of The Indian Express gave 2.5 stars out of 5 and gave a mixed review. Princy Alexander, critic from Onmanorama, stated that, "The character could have lost its grip..." A critic from Manorama News gave a mixed review.
