= Manjil Virinja Poovu =

Indian Malayalam-language television drama

- Genre: Soap opera
- Created by: Bilal parvathy
- Developed by: Sree Movies
- Written by: Sanika Parnasala
- Directed by: Arif Nedumkandom; Devika prasad
- Starring: Malavika Wales; Rekha Ratheesh
- Opening theme: Sanand George
- Country of origin: India
- Original language: Malayalam
- No. of seasons: 1
- No. of episodes: 1525

Production
- Executive producers: Rameez Kabeer; Sreekumar Mulayara
- Producer: Suresh Unnithan
- Cinematography: Baiju Gopal; Joy Robinson amalSuresh S
- Editors: Ajay Prasannan; Aneesh Unnithan
- Running time: 20–22 minutes

Original release
- Network: Mazhavil Manorama
- Release: 4 March 2019 – 21 July 2024

Manjil Virinja Poovu (transl. Flowers - I wish I could have) is an Indian Malayalam-language television drama. It aired from 4 March 2019 to 21 July 2024 on Mazhavil Manorama and streams on ManoramaMax. The show is produced by Prabha Unnithan under the banner of Sree Movies. It stars Malavika Wales in the main lead role along with Rekha Ratheesh, Yuva Krishna and Akhil Anand. It is one of the top-rated TV series in Mazhavil Manorama since its inception.

== Plot ==
The series portrays the story of a young girl Anjana Shankaran who worked as a worker in a tea plantation who later became a District Collector and at last became The Chief Minister of Kerala. The story revolves around the sudden happenings in the life of Anjana.

The latter half of the serial revolves around Chithira, daughter of Anjana and grand daughter of Malika. She lives with her grandmother Malika, with the story following her life and time in school. She has to withstand bullying and hardship due to her socioeconomic status and the fact that her mother Anjana was well known in the town. Chithira represents the new generation version of her mothers values.

== Cast ==
=== Main ===
- Malavika Wales as Chief Minister Anjana Shankaran IAS: First female Chief Minister of Kerala; Former sub-collector of Devikulam; Manu's wife.
- Rekha Ratheesh as Mallika Prathap: Anjana's mother-in-law
- Yuva Krishna as Manu Prathap: Anjana's husband.
- Eileen Eliza / Anuvinda as Chithira : daughter of Anjana and grand daughter of Mallika
- Shalu Menon as Prathibha
- Saniya Rafi / Aarcha as Niranjana Vinayan, daughter of Vinayan and Lekshmi
- Vineetha Devadas as Sreeja, domestic help and Mallika's assistant
- Leswin as Simon, Pratibha's adopted grandson
- Adhil as Hari, Mahesh's son

=== Recurring ===
- Sana Sree as Raziya Fathima IPS, daughter of Azadi
- Sona Nair as Sudha
- Gayathri Ramesh as Anarkali
- Akhina Shibu as Suja, former caretaker of Prathibhamma. Wife of Shaji.
- Manish Krishna as Mahesh, auto driver, Mallika and Chithira's caretaker
- Thomas Kuriakose as Ajay Naik
- Lakshmi Surendran as Daisy
- Lakshmi Nair as Ragini Mahesh

=== Former supporting cast ===
- Akhil Anand as Pichathi Shaji, biological son of Raghuram. Husband of Suja.
- Jismy / Lekshmi Surendran /Jismy as Sona, Rajeevnath' s daughter and Vinay's Wife
- Dominic Chittat as Nayik
- Bimal Joy as Ananthan, Shaji's friend and assistant
- Joe Varghese as Vinayan, son of Prathiba and Das. Husband of Sona. Foster son of Bhaskaran.
- Akhilesh as Rajeevnath, former CEO of Corporate India and Sona's father
- Geetha as Sreelekha IPS
- Jolly Easow
- Maneesha K. Subrahmaniam as Renuka a.k.a Captian, Chithira's stepmother
- Sindhu Jacob as Mariam Lucos, MLA
- Daveed John as Commissioner Sethupathi IPS
- Swathi Thara as Leona Alex, Head of UK spring crown consultancy who places Anjana as the Chief consultant
- Vriddhi Vishal as Anumol.
- Justin George Mathew as Arun, childhood friend of Anjana, Anjana's ex-lover
- Anas Abbas as Anoop
- Resh Lakshna as Maya, ex-lover of Manu
- Pinky Kannan as Teena, Mallika's Personal assistant
- Vikraman as Shankaran, Anjana's Father
- Ajoobsha as Praveen
- Prajusha as Sister
- Vinod Nair as Manager
- Givanios Pullan
- Anusree (Prakrithi) as Young Mallika
- Stelna as Mallika's mother
- Arun Mohan as Krishnadas, husband of Prathiba
- Poojappura Radhakrishnan as Madhavan, Anjana's driver
- Hari Shankar as Commissioner Raghu Raj IPS
- Anil K Sivaram as Indran
- Rijin Raj as Girish, son of Mulamoottil Shekaran. Brother of Rejitha.
- ____ as Mulamoottil Shekaran. Father of Girish and Rejitha. Former driver of Raghuram. Later a businessman and a criminal. Second husband of Reghuram's widow.
- RJ Kripesh as Praveen.
- Neeraja Pillai as Rejitha, daughter of Mulamoottil Shekaran. Sister of Girish.
- Renu as Mathiparu
- ____ as Pushpa
- ____as Kalyani, domestic help of PK NILAYAM
- Jayan as Dr.Janardhanan
- Syam S Namboothiri as Jayalal
- Chandrabhanu Sahiti as Driver Chandran
- Binil Khader as Sabu Cherian, friend and former classmate of Manu Prathap.
- Rajesh Narayanan as Kanneth Krishnan, CPC member.
- Pramod Mani as Bimal Krishnan. Son of Kanneth Krishnan. Friend of Moncy. One of the two young men who kidnaps Bhaskaran, shoots Bhaskaran to death, and repeatedly tries to kill Anjana. Later killed by Anjana.
- Jasmir Khan as Moncy. Friend of Bimal Krishnan. One of the two young men who kidnaps Bhaskaran, shoots Bhaskaran to death, and repeatedly tries to kill Anjana. Later killed by Anjana.
- Priyanka Chandran as Valli
- Murugan Panavila as former police officer Joseph Samuel.
- Bijikumar as Constable
- Shobi Thilakan as Bhaskaran
- Kiran Raj as Mohammad bin Azadi, drug mafia and underworld don.
- Adarsh as Shine
  - Auto driver
- Athira Praveen as Leomi
- Bindu Krishna as Leomi's mother
- Ravikrishnan Gopalakrishnan as Sharma
- Shanal Chandran as Akbar Azadi

=== Guest ===
- Shwetha Menon as herself
- Arun G Raghavan as Sudev

== Dubbed version ==
Language	Title	Original release	Network(s)	Last aired
Tamil	Vaadi Rasanthi வாடி ராசாத்தி	20 May 2024	Thanthi One	Ongoing
