= Subramanian Gopalakrishnan =

Indian actor

- Occupation: Actor
- Years active: 2006–present

Subramanian Gopalakrishnan is an Indian actor who has appeared in Malayalam and Tamil serials, as well as Tamil films. He gained popularity by portraying the character 'Arjun Deshai' in the popular Malayalam serial Chandanamazha aired in Asianet.

== Career ==
Subramanian made his acting debut as a lead in the Tamil film Aavani Thingal.. He also worked as an associate director in the Tamil movies Pachai Engira Kathu and Karuppampatti. Later he started working in television serials. His first work in television was Valli. He also acted as a lead in Tamil serial Deivamagal. Currently he is in Chandanamazha.

== Filmography ==
As actor

Year	Title	Role	Language	Notes
2006	Aavani Thingal	Rasappa	Tamil	Credited as Srikumar
2013	Pachai Engira Kaathu		Tamil	Assistant Director
2013	Karuppampatti		Tamil	Assistant Director; Uncredited
2024	Aakri Kalyanam		Malayalam	
2024	Rebel	Autopsy Doctor	Tamil	Uncredited
2024	The Greatest of All Time	SATS Police	Tamil	
2024	Buddy	Apparao	Telugu	Debut
2024	Vettaiyan	Human Resources officer	Tamil	Uncredited
2024	Yolo	Akilandam	Tamil	

== Television ==
Year	Title	Role	Channel	Language	Notes	Ref.
2012–2013	Valli	Karthik	Sun TV	Tamil		
2013–2017	Deivamagal	Karthik	Sun TV	Tamil		
2014–2017	Chandanamazha	Arjun Jaypal Desai	Asianet	Malayalam		
2019	Kalyanamam Kalyanam	Suriya	Star Vijay	Tamil		
2019	Anjali	Suriya	Star Vijay	Tamil		
2020	Sooryakanthi	Varun	Mazhavil Manorama	Malayalam		
2020	Aksharathettu	Varun	Mazhavil Manorama	Malayalam		
2021–2022	Palunku	Yadu	Asianet	Malayalam		
2022	Ethirneechal	Sriram Thiruvengadam	Sun TV	Tamil		
2023–2024	Amme Bhagavathy/Attukal Amma	Shukan	Flowers TV	Tamil		
2023	MY3	Stalin Joseph	Disney+ Hotstar	Tamil	Uncredited	

2026 - Mukhachithram -

== Awards and nominations ==
Year	Award	Category	Serial	result
2015	Asianet Television Awards	Best actor	Chandanamazha	Nominated
2015	Asianet Television Awards	Most popular Actor	Chandanamazha	Nominated
2015	Asianet Television Awards	Special Jury	Chandanamazha	Won
2015	Asianet Television Awards	Best Pair (with Meghna Vincent)	Chandanamazha	Nominated
2016	Asianet Television Awards	Best actor	Chandanamazha	Nominated
2016	Asianet Television Awards	Most popular Actor	Chandanamazha	Won
2017	Asianet Television Awards	Best actor	Chandanamazha	Nominated
2017	Asianet Television Awards	Most popular Actor	Chandanamazha	Won
2017	Asianet Television Awards	Best Pair (with Meghna Vincent)	Chandanamazha	Nominated
