= Malayalee House =

Indian Malayalam reality TV series

- Genre: Entertainment
- Created by: Surya TV
- Presented by: Revathi
- Country of origin: India
- Original language: Malayalam
- No. of seasons: 01
- No. of episodes: 85

Production
- Running time: 60–75 minutes

Original release
- Network: Surya TV
- Release: 5 May – 30 August 2013

Related
- Bigg Boss; Bigg Brother

Malayalee House was an Indian Malayalam TV reality show which aired on Surya TV. It was an adaptation of Big Brother. The first season started airing on 5 May 2013, and ended on 30 August 2013. Revathi was the host for the show. Rahul Easwar was declared the winner of the first season, followed by Sindhu Joy as first runner up and Thinkal Bhal second runner up.

== Concept ==
Malayalee House is a reality show based on the original Dutch Big Brother format developed by John de Mol. A number of contestants (known as "residents") live in a purpose-built house and are isolated from the rest of the world. Each week, residents nominate one among them for eviction, and the resident who receives the most nominations has to leave the house. The residents in Malayalee House are famous personalities in their respective fields. All the rooms in Malayalee House are locked in the beginning of the show. A room will be opened when a contestant gets evicted. The room to be opened after an eviction will be decided by the contestants through voting.

=== The house ===
The Malayalee House was built exclusively for the show at a film studio in Hyderabad owned by actor Nagarjuna. The open area at the center of the house (Nadumuttam) is the center place for all house activities. There is a kitchen, prayer room, and several bedrooms in the house. The house has no TV connection, no phones, and no Internet connection or clocks. Residents were overseen by 30 close circuit television cameras (hidden behind mirrors) 24/7. The house was equipped with LCD displays/speakers through which instructions were given to the contestants. The contestants have named all the cameras and the main camera is called "Kanthaari".

=== Rules ===
The show consists of 16 'residents' who live together with the main intention of creating a show out of the space and time provided to them. Residents must evict the least liked participant, from the option given to them by the Anchor, based on the rule set (with consideration of the ratings and the response from TV viewers). The rules for the contestants have never been told to the audience. They cannot leave the premises unless they are evicted or due to special reasons (e.g. medical concerns). Some of the contestants may be 'planted' or 'guests'. The audience is made to keep guessing as to who is acting, fake or genuine.

== Publication ==
The main television coverage took the form of a highlights programme aired on Surya TV at 8:00 PM (Mon-Fri). Each episode contains the main events of two days worth of previously recorded footage. The extra video footage that is not part of the daily episode are aired at 10:30 PM on the same day which is called Malayalee House -Kaanakazhchakal.

== Contestants ==
Career	Contestants
Politics	Sindhu Joy
Singer	Chithra Iyer
Singer	Harisankar Kalavoor
Singer	Sherrin Varghese
Social Activist and Media Professional	Rahul Easwar
Intellectual	G. S. Pradeep (GS)
Director	Sojan Joseph
Fashion Choreographer	Dalu Krishnadas
Actors	Neena Kurup
Actors	Sneha Nambiar
Actors	Bindu Varapuzha
Actors	Rosin Jolly
Actors	Narayanankutty
Actors	Santhosh Pandit
Models	Sandeep Menon
Models	Dr. Asha Gopinathan (Sasha)
Models	Akshitha
Models	Thinkal Bhal

== Eviction ==
=== Eviction by inmates ===
- In the first week, Bindu Varapuzha was eliminated by 11 votes.
- In the second week, Akkshita was evicted by 9 votes.
- In the third week, Harishankar Kalavoor was eliminated for health reasons.
- In the fourth week, Santosh Pandit was eliminated by 6 votes.

=== Up for public eviction the most times ===
Evictions faced	Housemate(s)
8	Sasha
5	Thinkal Bhal, Rosin Jolly
4	Sherrin Varghese, Rahul Easwar
3	Neena Kurup
2	G. S. Pradeep, Sindhu Joy
1	Narayanan Kutty, Chitra Iyer, Dalu Krishnadas, Sandeep Menon, Sojan Joseph, Santhosh Pandit

=== Eviction pattern ===
Contestant	Week 1	Week 2	Week 3	Week 4	Week 5	Week 6	Week 7	Week 8	Week 9	Week 10	Week 11	Week 12	Week 13	Week 14	Week 15	Week 16	Week 17
Rahul Easwar									Nominated			Nominated	Nominated			Nominated	Winner
Sindhu Joy							Nominated	Nominated		Nominated	Nominated					Nominated	First Runner up
Thinkal Bhal							Nominated					Nominated				Nominated	Second runner Up
Asha Gopinathan					Nominated	Nominated	Nominated	Nominated	Nominated		Nominated	Nominated				Nominated	Evicted
Neena Kurup							Nominated		Nominated							Nominated	Evicted
Rosin Jolly							Nominated	Nominated				Nominated	Nominated			Nominated	Evicted
G S Pradeep									Nominated			Nominated	Nominated			Evicted	Guest
Sherrin Varghese							Entry		Nominated		Nominated	Nominated	Evicted				
Santhosh Pandit				Evicted	Re-Entry						Evicted						
Sneha Nambiar											Disqualified						
Sojan Joseph										Evicted							
Sandeep Menon									Evicted						Guest		
Dalu Krishnadas							Evicted										
Chithra Iyer						Evicted											
Narayanankutty					Evicted												
Harisankar Kalavoor		Entry	Evicted														
Akshitha		Evicted												Guest			
Bindu Varappuzha	Evicted																

Not in MH Wild Card Entry Evicted week Disqualified In MH Finalist Winner

=== Timeline of events ===
- Week 1 – Week 4: contestants held a poll to vote out another disliked contestant. Whoever got the maximum votes were evicted that week.
- Week 3: Harisankar Kavaloor was eliminated for medical reasons.
- Week 4: Santhosh Pandit was eliminated by 6 votes by other contestants
- Week 5: Public voting began this week. Narayanan Kutty was eliminated. Due to huge public support Santhosh Pandit made a re-entry via wild card.
- Week 6: Chitra Iyer was eliminated.
- Week 7: Nominations were by playing a surprise game where each contestant is given a set of animal names which they had to match with other contestants. Those contestant whose names were not on the list went for nomination. Sherrin Varghese entered MH as a Planted Contestant.
- Week 8: There was no eviction in this week. Rosin Jolly was removed for some time to make the contestants believe she had been eliminated. However, she returned after a few hours.
- Week 10: For the first time Saasha was not nominated for eviction.
- Week 11: Rahul nominated three contestants for elimination (Asha Gopinathan, Santhosh Pandit and Sherrin Varghese). Thinkal Bhal was automatically nominated. Sneha Nambiar was asked to leave the house for violating rules. Santhosh Pandit was evicted this week.
- Week 12: There was no eviction this week as a Ramadan gift for the nominees.
- Week 13: Sherrin was evicted. The contestants played a game to win a Renault Duster SUV.
- Week 14: Rahul won the SUV. Akshita made a re-entry as a Guest. There was no eviction.
- Week 15: All the inmates were nominated for Week 16 elimination. Sandeep Menon made a guest appearance.
- Week 16: A new competition was held for a Tata Nano car. Ridhi made a guest appearance in the house. G S Pradeep was evicted. Sindhu Joy won the Nano Car task.
- Week 17: MH completed 100 days on 13 August 2013.

=== Inmates voted against ===
Contestant	Week 1	Week 2	Week 3	Week 4	Week 5	Week 6	Week 7	Week 8	Week 9	Week 10	Week 11	Week 12	Week 13	Week 14	Week 15	Week 16	Week 17
Rahul Easwar	Santhosh	?	Sasha	Santhosh	Santhosh	Sasha		Thinkal	Sherrin	Thinkal	Sherrin, Sasha, Santhosh	Sherrin	Sherrin				
Thinkal Bhal	?	?	Chitra	Pradeep	Rosin	Pradeep		Rosin	Sasha	Sojan		Rosin	Rosin				
Sindhu Joy	Bindu	?		Santhosh	Santhosh	Chitra		Sasha	Sherrin	Thinkal		Sasha	Sasha				
Asha Gopinathan	?	?	Chitra	Sneha	Santhosh	Pradeep		Thinkal	Neena	Thinkal		Sindhu	Rosin				
Neena Kurup	?	?	Sasha	Pradeep	Narayanan	Sasha		Thinkal	Sasha	Sojan		Sasha	Rahul				
Rosin Jolly	?	?	Sasha	Narayanan	Narayanan	Sandeep		Sasha	Sherrin	Thinkal		Sasha	Sherrin				
G. S. Pradeep	Akshitha	Akshitha		Santhosh	Narayanan	Sasha		Sasha	Neena	Thinkal		Sasha	Rahul				
Sherrin Varghese								Sasha	Sasha	Sojan		Rahul					
Santhosh Pandit	Akshitha	?		Pradeep	Narayanan			Rosin	Sherrin	Sojan							
Sneha Nambiar	Bindu	?	Sasha	Narayanan	Santhosh	Sasha		Sasha	Sandeep	Thinkal							
Sojan Joseph	?	?	Chitra	Neena	Sandeep	Neena		Sasha	Neena	Thinkal							
Sandeep Menon	Bindu	?	Chitra	Rahul	Santhosh	Chitra		Rosin	Rahul								
Dalu Krishnadas	?	?	Chitra	Santhosh	Santhosh	Chitra											
Chitra Iyer	?	?	Sasha	Narayanan	Narayanan	Pradeep.											
Narayanan Kutty	?	?	Chitra	Santhosh	Santhosh												
HarisankarKalavoor																	
Akshitha	Bindu	Pradeep															
Bindu Varappuzha	Akshitha																

== Youtube hits ==
From the initial episodes itself, the program received very good viewership (approximately 0.25 – 0.3 million per episode) in the Surya TV YouTube Channel. However, the view count hit below 0.2 million from approximately days 40-50 (eviction week of Chitra Iyer). Later, though, for a brief period, the view count could hit above 0.2 million. From approximately days 70-80 (eviction week of Santhosh Pandit and the disqualification of Sneha Nambiar) the viewership again fell below 0.2 million.

== Controversies and criticism ==
=== Contestants allowed contact with outside world ===
Even though the second title of Malayali House indicates that there is no connection to the outer world, Pradeep's wife came into Malayali House on 19 June 2013. The episode shows G S Pradeep and his wife use a secret code language to communicate with each other about the outside world and the viewers' opinions. Also, Pradeep's kids, Souparnika and Suryanarayanan; Sojan's kids, Chelsa and Crisa; and Sneha's kids, Varun and Tarun were in Malayali House on the 6th week. In later weeks, more guests were introduced into the house, including Neena's daughter Pavithra. Rahul and Sneha won a contest and were allowed to go out of MH to a mall to view a movie. There, Sneha contacted the outside world using a stranger's phone. She did this in a restroom where there were no crew members. Later, she was disqualified for breaking the rules. Thinkal's sister and Sasha's mother are also allowed in the house as guests.

=== Accusations of rigged evictions ===
MH was recorded two weeks before it was aired. Therefore, the program completed 100 days on 13 August 2013 but this final episode was aired on 26 August. In spite of this fortnight-long lag, the show had listed contestants for eviction on Facebook and through SMS. Since the broadcast events had already taken place, public votes had no effect, but this was not made clear.

Producers brought in Sherrin Varghese as a planted guest. The viewers were never informed of this. Sherrin Varghese was kept in all the eviction nominations, even though MH had no intention of removing him through public voting.

The hosts of the show decided to invite a public poll for the eviction of housemates from the 5th week onwards. But, one of the housemates Santhosh Pandit was having the maximum audience support and was evicted in the 4th week by Anand. The audience of the show widely claim that this was a planned move by hosts of the show to evict Pandit. The public support suggested that Pandit was perhaps better off than some of the other participants who have been exposed through the show. Later the makers of the show admitted that evicting him was a mistake. The makers of the show surprised the audience and housemates by bring back Pandit as a wildcard entry to the house at the end of the 5th week in a dramatic way. He was introduced back by lowering him from the top with the help of a crane. Santosh Pandit was evicted again on 11th week by public voting.

There has been an outcry on the internet over the eviction of Dalu Krishnadas, Sandeep Menon and Santhosh Pandit. During the nomination of Dalu, a Facebook poll in Surya TV channel showed the maximum votes of eviction to Neena Kurup and Thingal Bhal. In spite of receiving a huge number of votes for eviction, Neena was not evicted and Dalu was shown going out of the house. Sandeep Menon suffered a similar fate. During the eviction of Santhosh Pandit the second time, the following votes were received by the contestant for eviction in Facebook: Santhosh Pandit (199), Sherrin Varghese (780), Thinkal Bhal (270), and Asha Gopinathan (227). In spite of receiving the lowest votes, Santhosh Pandit was asked to leave the house. There was an outcry on Facebook and their YouTube channel about the eviction. It became very evident that the show was trying to protect some contestants by the 12th week. Two instances of elimination were canceled when Rosin Jolly was nominated, much to the disdain of the public.

=== Criticism from women's groups and on social media ===
Many women's organisations such as the Women Commission of Kerala. The commission has asked for an explanation from Surya TV and discussed the matter in a meeting at Thiruvananthapuram. It concluded that some participants are degrading female participants in the show. Social media was full of criticism about supposed tastelessness. Earlier, the Democratic Women's Association and DYFI opposed this programme and asked for it to be banned.

=== Bigg Boss copyright infringement ===
A case was filed by Endemol Group, the makers of the popular reality TV show Bigg Boss, against the Malayalee House makers (Sun TV and Vedartha Entertainment Pvt. Ltd.) for copying the production format of Bigg Boss. Endemol filed a suit in Bombay High Court against Sun TV Network Ltd. and four others, seeking an injunction to restrain them from exploiting, telecasting, publicizing or continuing to telecast the reality show Malayalee House which had allegedly infringing the Group's copyright in the production format of Bigg Boss.
