= Palunku (TV series) =

Indian Malayalam television soap opera

- Genre: Soap opera
- Based on: Khorkhuto by Leena Gangopadhyay
- Story by: Leena Gangopadhyay
- Country of origin: India
- Original language: Malayalam
- No. of episodes: 288

Production
- Producer: G. Jayakumar
- Camera setup: Multi-camera
- Running time: 20-25 minutes
- Production company: Ross Petals Entertainment

Original release
- Network: Asianet
- Release: 22 November 2021 – 30 December 2022

Related
- Khorkuto; Namma Veetu Ponnu; Thipkyanchi Rangoli; Kabhi Kabhie Ittefaq Sey

Palunku (transl. Crystal) is an Indian Malayalam-language soap opera. The show premiered on 22 November 2021 on Asianet. It stars Tejas Gowda and Tonisha Kapileswarapu in lead roles along with Subramanian Gopalakrishnan, Rajesh Hebbar and Lakshmi Priya in pivotal roles. It airs on Asianet and on-demand through Disney+ Hotstar. It is an official remake of Bengali TV series Khorkuto. The show ended on 30 December 2022.

== Synopsis ==
Worlds and values clash when headstrong and rich girl Nila meets aristocratic Deepak, a scientist. Adding fuel to this fiery combination is his family.

== Cast ==
=== Main ===
- Tejas Gowda/ Tanuj Menon as Deepak: A young scientist
- Kushi Sampath Kumar / Tonisha Kapileswarapu as Nila: Deepak's wife
- Anjali Hari as scientist Arunima: who loves Deepak

=== Recurring ===
- Subramanian Gopalakrishnan as Yadhu: Deepak's elder brother
- Lakshmi Balagopal as Karthika: Yadhu's wife
- Rajesh Hebbar as Dr. Anirudhan: Nila's father
- Lakshmi Priya as Anuradha: Anirudhan's sister and Arunima's mother
- KPAC Rajkumar as Janardhanan: Deepak's father
- Siva Kavitha as Padma Prabha: Deepak's aunt
- Vijayan Karanthoor as Mukundan: Yadhu's father
- Rasitha Aneesh as Saumini: Deepak's mother
- Ala S Nayana as Dr.Vimala: Nila's mother
- Jolly Easo as Saradha: Yadhu's mother
- Julie Hendry as Salma: Arunima's best friend
- Anjali Vinod as Samantha: Deepak's friend
- Sreekanth as 'Vadival' Sajeevan
- Sumi santhosh as Pavithra: Yadhu's sister
- Roshna Thiyyath as Sreeja
- Deva Dileep as Manya
- Jeeja Surendran as Durga
- Aadil Mohammed as Naveen: Pavithra's son

=== Guest ===
- Sreejith Vijay as Nikhil: Nila's elder brother (died in the serial)
- Gayatri Arun as herself
- Devika Unni

== Adaptations ==
Language	Title	Original release	Network(s)	Last aired	Notes	Ref.
Bengali	Khorkuto খড়কুটো	17 August 2020	Star Jalsha	21 August 2022	Original	
Tamil	Namma Veetu Ponnu நம்ம வீட்டு பொண்ணு	16 August 2021	Star Vijay	25 March 2023	Remake	
Marathi	Thipkyanchi Rangoli ठिपक्यांची रांगोळी	4 October 2021	Star Pravah	18 November 2023	Remake	
Malayalam	Palunku പളുങ്ക്	22 November 2021	Asianet	30 December 2022	Remake	
Hindi	Kabhi Kabhie Ittefaq Sey कभी कभी इत्तेफाक से	3 January 2022	StarPlus	20 August 2022	Remake	
Kannada	Jenugudu ಜೇನುಗೂಡು	21 February 2022	Star Suvarna	30 September 2023	Remake	

== Reception ==
The show launched on 22 November 2021 at 8:30 PM IST. From beginning it doesn't got a good viewership. On 27 March 2022, the show is moved to afternoon slot of 1:30 PM due to low TRP and launch of Bigg Boss Season 4. The show ended on 30 December 2022 due to poor viewership.
