= Malavika Wales =

Indian film and television actress and classical dancer

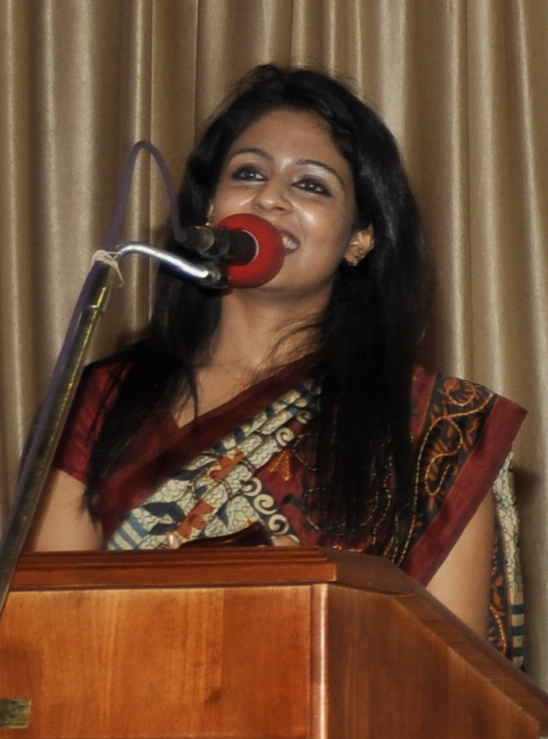
- Born: 1993 (age 32–33)
- Occupation: Actress
- Years active: 2010–present

Malavika Wales is an Indian actress. She made her acting debut in Malarvaadi Arts Club (2010).

== Career ==
She participated at the Miss Kerala contest in 2009. At age 17, she was the youngest contestant that year. She made it till the third round and was adjudged ‘Miss Beautiful Eyes’ at the contest. Later, Vineeth Sreenivasan saw her photos and auditioned her for a role in Malarvaadi Arts Club.

Although Malarvaadi Arts Club was her first release, she had acted in Lenin Rajendran’s Makaramanju before. When she was studying in Class VI, she also acted in his documentary, Aisha. She starred in Nandeesha the Kannada remake of the Malayalam blockbuster, Thilakkam, where she reprised Kavya Madhavan's role. She was then seen in My Fan Ramu and later in the art house flick, Aattakatha, where she played the Anglo-Indian daughter of a Kathakali artiste played by actor Vineeth.Malavika made her Tamil debut in Enna Satham Indha Neram in which she was seen as a teacher of deaf-mute students.

=== Television debut and success ===
In 2015, Malavika made her television debut through the Malayalam TV series Ponnambili which aired on Mazhavil Manorama which made her a common name among Malayali households.

She acted in Nandini, a South Indian multilingual serial as Janaki (spirit) airing in Sun TV, Surya TV, Gemini TV and Udaya TV. She also acted in Ammuvinte Amma as Anupama along with Vinaya Prasad. She acted in the longest-running soap opera in Malayalam, Manjil Virinja Poovu, and took a break after appearing in up to episode 1133. After a brief hiatus, she is currently working on a new TV series, Meenu's Kitchen.

== Filmography ==
=== Films ===
Year	Film	Role	Language	Notes
2010	Malarvaadi Arts Club	Geethu	Malayalam	Debut film
2011	Makaramanju	Unknown	Malayalam	Uncredited Role
2011	Innanu Aa Kalyanam	Neelima	Malayalam	
2012	Nandeesha	Kavya	Kannada	
2013	My Fan Ramu	Shalini	Malayalam	
2013	Aattakatha	Maleena	Malayalam	
2014	Enna Satham Indha Neram	Meenakshi	Tamil	
2014	Arasuvai Arasan	Anju	Tamil	
2018	Azhagumagan	Vasanthi	Tamil	

=== Television ===
Year	Show	Role	Channel	Language	Notes	Ref.
2011	Taste of Kerala	Celebrity Presenter	Amrita TV	Malayalam	Cookery show	
2011	Super Star The Ultimate	Host	Amrita TV	Malayalam	Music Reality show	
2015–2016	Ponnambili	Ponnambili	Mazhavil Manorama	Malayalam		
2017–2018	Nandini	Janaki / Seetha	Sun TV	Tamil	Dual role	
2017–2019	Nandini	Janaki / Seetha	Udaya TV	Kannada	Dual role	
2017–2018	Ammuvinte Amma	Anupama	Mazhavil Manorama	Malayalam		
2019–2023	Manjil Virinja Poovu	Anjana Shankaran	Mazhavil Manorama	Malayalam		
2021	Oru Chiri Iru Chiri Bumper Chiri	Host	Mazhavil Manorama	Malayalam	Episode 174 (Guest Appearance)	
2024–2025	Meenu's Kitchen	Meenu	Mazhavil Manorama	Malayalam		
2026- present	Ivar Vivahitharayal	Bhoomija / Abhirami	Asianet	Malayalam		
