= Azhagumagan =

2018 Indian Tamil-language film

- Theatrical release poster
- Directed by: Azhagan Selva
- Written by: Azhagan Selva
- Produced by: Arjjun Udhay
- Starring: Arjjun Udhay; Malavika Wales
- Cinematography: Akku Ajmal
- Edited by: C. K. Mahesh
- Music by: James Vasanthan
- Production company: Avatar Movies
- Distributed by: Sri Murugan Cine Arts
- Release date: 10 August 2018
- Running time: 136 minutes
- Country: India
- Language: Tamil

Azhagumagan (transl. Handsome boy) is a 2018 Indian Tamil language action drama film written and directed by Azhagan Selva in his directorial debut. The film stars then-newcomer Arjjun Udhay, and Malayalam actress Malavika Wales, who made her Tamil film debut. The film is produced by Arjjun Udhay under the production banner Avatar Movies, and it is distributed by Sri Murugan Cine Arts company. James Vasanthan composed music for the film while editing is handled by C. K. Mahesh. The film was released on 10 August 2018 after a six-year-long delay.

== Synopsis ==
The story is based on the premise that life goes on, irrespective of the problems that people face every day.

== Cast ==
As per the film's opening and closing credits:

- Arjjun Udhay as Guna
- Malavika Wales as Vasanthi
- G. M. Kumar
- Pawan
- Ilavarasu as Azhagu
- Singampuli
- Nitish Veera
- Senthi Kumari as Azhagu's wife
- Meesai Rajendranath as Higher official
- Munnar Ramesh as Police officer
- Cheran Raj as Police Inspector
- Naadodigal Gopal as Uncle
- Thavasi
- Vijay Ganesh

== Production ==
Azhagan Selva, who worked as a former associate to film director Karu Pazhaniappan, made his debut directorial venture through this project. Debutant Arjjun Udhay was chosen to play the male lead role and Malavika Wales was roped in to play the female lead role, which marked her first Tamil feature film. This movie was supposed to be the first Tamil film release for Malavika as it was slated for 2013 release before the releases of her other projects, including Enna Satham Indha Neram and Arusuvai Arasan in 2014. The production of the film commenced in 2012 and was reported to have completed its post production status in 2013. However, the release of the film was delayed due to financial troubles for six years. The film then initially announced to have its theatrical release on 3 August 2018 but was again postponed due to censorship issues before its original release on 10 August 2018.

The film is set in the backdrop of the rural regions of South Tamil Nadu, and most of the portions of the film were shot in Theni and Kerala.

== Soundtrack ==
The music for the film is scored by James Vasanthan while lyrics are penned by Yugabharathi, Thamarai and Mohanraj. The album was released on 3 August 2013 and received positive reviews from the audience. The film consists of four songs.

Azhagumagan (Original Motion Picture Soundtrack)

Soundtrack album by James Vasanthan
- Released: 3 August 2013
- Genre: Feature film soundtrack
- Length: 18:33
- Producer: James Vasanthan

James Vasanthan chronology
Vizha (2013)	Azhagumagan (Original Motion Picture Soundtrack) (2013)	Sandamarutham (2015)

Soundtrack
No.	Title	Singer(s)	Length
1.	"Koothadikuthu Koothadikuthu"	Shankar Mahadevan	4:59
2.	"Manasula Manasula"	Hariharan; Pooja Vaidyanath	5:35
3.	"Yenna Solla"	Jay; Sai Sutha	3:02
4.	"Yenna Yenna Idhu"	Nivas	4:57
