= Rekha Ratheesh =

Indian actress

- Born: Thiruvananthapuram, Kerala, India
- Occupation: Actress
- Years active: 2001–present
- Spouses: Yousaf (m. 2000; div. 2000); Nirmal Prakash (m. 2001; died 2010); Kamal Roy (m. 2012; div. 2017); Abhilash (m. 2019; sep. 2020)
- Children: 1

Rekha Ratheesh is an Indian television actress known for her work in Malayalam productions. She is best known for her roles in the television series Parasparam and Manjil Virinja Poovu.

== Early life ==
Rekha Ratheesh was born in 1982 to Ratheesh, a dubbing artist, and Radhadevi, an actress and dubbing artist. Her father was from Thiruvananthapuram, and she was raised in Chennai. Her parents separated when she was 10 years old, and she chose to live with her father.

== Career ==
Rekha Ratheesh began her acting career at the age of four, portraying the childhood version of Revathi in the film Unnai Naan Santhithen. At the age of fourteen, she made her television debut in the Malayalam serial Nirakoottu on Asianet, directed by Srivalsan, after being introduced by Captain Raju. After a break, she appeared in several other television serials, including Manasu, Devi, Kavyanjali, and Swantham. She later gained wider recognition with her role in the serial Aayirathil Oruval on Mazhavil Manorama.

In 2013, Rekha took on the lead role in the soap opera Parasparam, which became one of the longest-running Malayalam television series. Her performance in this role earned her several awards, including five consecutive Asianet Television Awards from 2013 to 2018.

== Personal life ==
Rekha was married in April 2000, but the marriage ended in December of the same year. She had three subsequent marriages, all of which also ended in separation. She currently resides in Thiruvananthapuram with her son Ayan, who was born in 2011.

== Television ==
Year (s)	Title	Channel	Role	Notes
1999	Nirakkootukal	Asianet		Debut Soap Opera
	Oru Swapnam Pole		Annie	Telefilm
2000	Alakal	DD Malayalam		
2003	Swantham	Asianet		
2003	Manassu		Subhadra	Comeback
2004	Devi		Devi	
2005	Pakalmazha	Amrita TV		
2005	Kadamattathu Kathanar	Asianet	Itanpada Nair's wife	
2005	Kavyanjali	Surya TV		
2005	Vikramadithyan	Asianet		
2006	Unniyarcha	Asianet	Kunji	
2008	Sree Mahabhaghavatham	Asianet	Didi Devi	
2008	Shrikrishna Leela	Asianet		
2009	Adiparasakthi	Surya TV		
2009	Rahasyam	Asianet	Nirmala/Niranjana	
2009	Autograph	Asianet	Dr. Nirmala Prakash	
2010	Randamathoral	Asianet	Vimala Das	
2010	Mattoruval	Surya TV	Keerthi Mohandas	
2011	Nakshtradeepangal	Kairali TV	Host	Reality show
2011–2012	Snehakkoodu	Surya TV	Radha	
2012–2013	Aayirathil Oruval	Mazhavil Manorama	Madathilamma	
2013–2018	Parasparam	Asianet	Padippuraveetil Padmavathy	Won Asianet Television Awards -Best actress 2014; Best Character Actress 2015,2016,2017; Special Jury award 2018
2014	Badai Bungalow	Asianet		Talk show
2015–2016	My Marumakan	Surya TV	Lakshmi	
2015	Meghasandesham	Kairali TV		
2015	Kenal Sasiyude Onam	Asianet		Telefilm
2015	Aswamedham	Kairali TV	Participant	
2015–2016	Taste Time	Asianet	Host	Cookery show
2017	Run Baby Run	Asianet Plus		Talk show
2017–2018	Mamagam	Flowers	Manimangalath Neelambari	
2017	Ningalkkum Aakaam Kodeeshwaran	Asianet	Contestant	
2018–2019	Neelakuyil	Vijay TV	Radhamani	Tamil serial
2018	Urvashi Theaters	Asianet	Participant	
2019–2024	Manjil Virinja Poovu	Mazhavil Manorama	Mallika Prathap	
2019	Sthreepadham	Mazhavil Manorama	Mallika Prathap	Cameo Appearance
2019–2021	Pookkalam Varavayi	Zee Keralam	Parvathy	Replaced by Reshmi Boban
2020	Aksharathettu	Mazhavil Manorama	Vasundhara Devi	
2020	Suryakanthi	Mazhavil Manorama	Vasundhara Devi	Cameo Appearance
2020–2021	W with Rekha	YouTube	Host	Web series
2021–2023	Sasneham	Asianet	Indira	Won, AIMA - Best actress 2022,Asianet Television Awards - Best Character Actress
2021	Valkkanadi	Asianet	Participant	
2021	Start Music Season 3	Asianet	Participant	
2022–2025	Bhavana	Surya TV	Gayathri	
2024	Swayamvaram	Mazhavil Manorama	Indira	
2025	Kudumbashree Sharada	Zee Keralam	Rekha (Judge)	Extended Cameo
2026–present	Kanmashi	Zee Keralam	Sumangali	

== Filmography ==
- Unnai Naan Santhithen (1984) as Young Indumathi
- Pallavur Devanarayanan (1999) as Vasundhara's sister
- Mampazhakkalam (2004) as Sethu's wife
- April Fool (2010) as Sara
- Oru Nunakkadha (2011) as Savithri
- Subharathri (2019) as Sreeja's mother
- Ammakkorumma (2020) – album as Mother

== Controversies ==
In February 2026, Rekha Ratheesh alleged that she had been subjected to sustained cyberbullying and defamatory content on social media platforms, particularly YouTube. In a video statement, she appealed to the Government of Kerala and Chief Minister Pinarayi Vijayan to take action against individuals and channels that she claimed were circulating abusive videos and thumbnails targeting her. She stated that the harassment had severely affected her mental health and personal life, and said she had not received acting work for the previous nine months, which she attributed to the ongoing online attacks. She also warned that those responsible should be held accountable if any harm came to her.
