= Sasneham (TV series) =

- Genre: Soap opera
- Directed by: Shaiju Sukesh
- Country of origin: India
- Original language: Malayalam
- No. of seasons: 1
- No. of episodes: 559

Production
- Producer: Dr. Shaju Sham
- Running time: 20–22 minutes

Original release
- Network: Asianet; Disney+ Hotstar
- Release: 8 June 2021 – 25 March 2023

Sasneham is an Indian Malayalam-language television soap opera that aired on Malayalam entertainment Channel Asianet and also streams on Disney+ Hotstar, starring Rekha Ratheesh and K. P. A. C. Saji in lead roles. This series focuses on the trials and tribulations of an older generation who are thrown into old age homes. The show launched on 8 June 2021 and ended on 25 March 2023.

== Plot ==
Sasneham depicts the story of Indira and Balachandran, past lovers, who reunite in an old age home. They two are neglected by their own family. Indira has two children, Manu and Mini. After her husband's death, Indira lives with her daughter and gives her land in the name of Manu and his cunning wife Priya. As Mini and her family leave to the United States for a better career, Indira is forced to shift to Manu's home. Priya hates Indira extremely and taunts her. Much to Indira's dismay, Manu also supports Priya and behaves like a puppet at Priya's hand. Priya tries to get rid of Indira and considers her as a burden. Meanwhile, Indira tolerates everything and stays there for the sake of her son and her grandchildren, who are fond of her.

On the other hand, Balan has a daughter, Meera who is a good lady by heart but is forced to behave harshly to her own father due to her arrogant and a money-minded advocate husband, Raghu. He taunts Meera and Balan and insults Balan. Even his grandson Sudhi, ridicules Balan. This worries Balan.

Priya tries every other methods to get rid of Indira. She even goes to the extent of killing her by putting up an act that she changed for good and takes her to a temple and pushes her into the temple pond and escapes. But to Priya's dismay, she returns to her home after being rescued by Shankaranarayanan aka Shanku, a lawyer, and his childhood sweetheart, Nandha. Shanku was bought up in Thanal, a destitute home for the elderly which was run by Nandha's parents as he was an orphan. They become Indira's saviours.

Meanwhile, a mutual friend of Indira and Balan, Zachariah comes in to the picture who is a millionaire but has no children. He grows fond of Balan and he turns out to be a consolation for Balan. Zachariah asks about his long lost love during his schooling, who is revealed to be Indira and Balan also confesses that he always remembers her and wishes to meet her. Zachariah gets Indira's phone number to Balan and they both start a beautiful friendship. They hide their imperfections and their sufferings and exchange lies such as being rich with many servants and having caring children and in-laws in order to avoid getting hurt by the reality mutually. They also visit once at a restaurant with the help of Zachariah. But the relationship is considered shameful as their children discover it. But they assure that they are just friends but Priya and Raghu pay no heed and Manu strongly opposes their relationship.

Indira decides to leave the house and goes to Thanal due to Priya's prolonged torture to leave the family. Unknown to Indira, Balan also joins Thanal due to Raghu's constant nagging. After a series of events, both Balan and Indira realize that they are on the same situation and vows themselves to not hide anything hereafter. Their friendship grows. After the death of Zachariah, a friend of him search Indira and Balan to give a very important document relating to Zachariah's assets. He reveals that Zachariah have written a will in which the whole property of him, totally with a value of 150 crores, will be inherited by Balan and Indira respectively but at the condition of them getting married. Both Priya and Raghu realize their folly and try to bring back to their respective homes ignoring Manu and Meera's strong opposition and warnings and tries to get Indira and Balan married, but all the efforts are in vain when they refuse to marry as both consider that marriage is a divine bond which cannot be exploited for one's greed for money.

Both in-laws try their best to make them marry as they both are in the need of money but the duo refuses every time which leads to tension between them. Priya again gets intolerant with Indira and she demands her to go back to Thanal. But this time, Manu supports Indira wholeheartedly, and as a result a case gets filed by Priya claiming for the house by adding a fake assault case due to which Manu, Indira, and the two children leave from the home they were staying in as per court orders. Priya tries to get back her children but as they refuse to move in with her, she sends a divorce notice to Manu via Raghu. Manu, already stressed due to the concern of the future as he loses his job, becomes frustrated and decides to go on a spiritual pilgrimage to relax his mind. Due to this, Indira further gets distressed as they struggle for making their ends meet and Priya rejoices at this.

Indira faces financial difficulties as she has taken custody of the children. By seeing a guy selling biriyani for a cheap cost in the road, decides to start Ammayunu, which provides quality lunch for everyone at a low cost. Even though they did not succeed at first, their business improves as Indira and Balan get many orders. Priya tries her best to destroy the business by sending Food safety authorities, Municipal authorities (for getting her children back), etc. She even tries to start another food business named Magalunu, similar to Ammayunu and invites Kudumbavilaku serial fame Actor K.K Menon for inauguration but he fails to turn up on the occasion as he discovers that Madhavan, Priya's father is involved in a murder case which creates huge loss and shame for her. Finally, she sends a lady to add poison into the food, thus adulterating the food and closing the business. Indira and Balan are arrested but realize the truth and the lady is caught and says that Priya is the culprit. Police searches for her. Priya, with the help of her legal advisor Raghu, goes absconding to avoid arrest and applies for antiscipatory bail which gets rejected by the court. Priya gets into deep trouble.

== Cast ==
=== Main ===
- Rekha Ratheesh as Indira / Indu: Manu's mother, Priya's mother-in-law, Balachandran's childhood friend
- K. P. A. C. Saji as Balachandran / Balan: Meera's father, Adv. Raghu's father-in-law, Sudhi's grandfather, Indira's childhood friend
- Prasanth Kumar p as Adv. Shankaranarayanan / Shanku: A junior advocate also an orphan, Nandhitha's close friend and lover
- Sonu Anna Jacob as Nandhitha / Nandha, Shankaranarayanan's Wife
- Kishore as Gregory, Indira's real son
- Mithun Menon as Manu Chandran: Indira's fake son, Priya's husband

=== Recurring ===
- Anoop Sivasenan as Adv. Raghu: A senior advocate, Meera's husband, Sudhi's father, Balachandran's son-in-law
- Lakshmi Priya / Soniya Mohandas as Priya Manu: Manu's wife, Indira's daughter-in-law, Madhavan's daughter
- Anjana K. R. / Irine as Meera Raghu: Raghu's wife, Balachandran's daughter, Sudhi's mother
- Jixil Philip as Sudhi: Meera and Raghu's son, Balachandran's grandson
- Venugopal as Madhavan: Priya's father, Manu's father-in-law
- Rani Larius/____ as Saraswathy: Priya's mother, Manu's mother-in-law
- Rithika/Adhya Aurora as Mini: Indira's daughter, wife of Sajan and Manu's younger sister
- Ranjith Raj as Sajan: Mini's husband and Indira's son-in-law
- Maya as Girija: A servant of neighbourhood house of Manu who treats Indira as her own mother
- Aparna P. Nair as Sindhu: Priya's neighbour
- Arjun Sunil as Vinu: The son of Manu and Priya
- Anandritha Manu as Anu: Manu and Priya's daughter
- Kalyani Nair as Dr. Sethulakshmi
- Pradeep Kottayam as Vasudevan
- Illekettu Namboothiri as Surendran
- Sreekutty as Mohini
- Gayathri as Ragini
- Vinayak as Rupesh
- Padmakumar as CI Narayanan Kutty – Circle Inspector of Police

== Reception ==
The show premiered on 8 June 2021, a Tuesday at 8.40 PM as a filler due to another show Seetha Kalyanam halted temporarily due to COVID-19 second wave. Since the starting, the show received average TRP rating as there is a less promotion and after some weeks it is moved to evening slot of 6:30 PM. In some weeks of 2021, the show received highest TRP ratings of the evening time slot. From 13 February 2023, it began airing at 6:00 PM IST and ended on 25 March 2023.
