= Ammuvinte Amma =

Indian television series

- Genre: soap opera; Drama
- Created by: Prime Creations
- Written by: Rajini/ Philip Alappatt
- Directed by: Rajeev Nedumkandom
- Starring: Malavika Wales; Vinaya Prasad
- Theme music composer: Rajeev Attukal
- Composer: Sanand George
- Country of origin: India
- Original language: Malayalam
- No. of seasons: 1
- No. of episodes: 357

Production
- Producer: Prime Creations
- Cinematography: Manoj Kalagramam
- Editor: Vishnu Punalur

Original release
- Network: Mazhavil Manorama
- Release: 27 March 2017 – 13 July 2018

Ammuvinte Amma (ml;അമ്മുവിൻ്റെ അമ്മ) (English:Mother of Ammu) is an Indian Malayalam television serial that began on Mazhavil Manorama from 27 March 2017. The series replaced the serial Manjurukum Kaalam. The series went off-air on 13 July 2018 completing 357 episodes.

== Plot ==
Anupama alias Anu lives with her mother Padmaja alias Pappa and sister Ammu who is in 1st standard.

A boy falls in love with her who works with her in office. Later, it is revealed that Ammu is Anu's daughter and she is already married to her maths tutor, Kiran who had a mental disorder. He made Anu work so much and punished her for silly things. One day, Anu goes to her home. Kiran comes there and takes her with force.

While driving with her fast due to anger with her accident happens and Anu loses her memory and Kiran goes missing. Later, Anu becomes pregnant and as Anu don't know anything, Anu's mother tells Ammu is her daughter and Anu becomes her sister. Later, it is revealed that Kiran's aunt who looked him after his parents death gave him medicine to make him mad so that she will get his wealth.

== Cast ==
Main cast

- Malavika Wales as Anupama (Anu), Kiran's wife
- Baby Keshiya as Ammu
- Vinaya Prasad as Padmaja (Pappa)
- Srinish Aravind as Manoj (Manu)
- Subhash Balakrishnan as Kiran, Anu's husband
- Nikitha Murali as Dr.Shaithya, Anu's friend
- Preetha Pradeep as Sumi

Supporting Cast

- Kishore as Ramachandran
- Balachandran Chullikkadu as Gopi Maash
- Binny George as Sarayu
- Rajini Murali as Vijaya; Gopi Maash's wife
- Payyanur Murali as Sethu
- Varsha as Seetha
- Bincy Joseph as Geethanjali
- Arya Parvathy as Supriya, Manu's sister
- Ambareesh as Jayanthan
- Rishi as Vaishakan
- Aishwarya as Lakshmi
- Shantakumari as Margret
- Neelambari Menon as Raginiamma
- Jolly Esow
- Anzil Rehaman

Earlier Cast

- Sajesh Nambiar as Manu
- Anila Sreekumar as Seetha
- K.P.S.C.Saji as Sethu
- Anu as Supriya

== Dubbed Version ==
Language	Title	Original release	Network(s)	Last aired
Tamil	Ammu அம்மு	25 May 2024	Thanthi One	Ongoing

== Development ==
On 3 March 2017, first promo of the show 'Festival' was released by Mazhavil Manorama on YouTube. On 11 March 2017 second promo of the show 'beside the beach' was released by Mazhavil Manorama. South Indian actress Vinaya Prasad is making her comeback to Malayalam television industry after a hiatus of 3 years through this serial. Malavika Wales who is known for Ponnambili plays the lead role. Subhash Balakrishnan is the male lead.
