= Parasparam (TV series) =

Indian television series

- Genre: Action; Drama; Crime; Thriller
- Created by: Shashi Sumeet Mittal; Sumeet Hukamchand Mittal
- Written by: Pradeep Panicker
- Story by: Jayakumar
- Directed by: Purushothaman; Sudheesh Sankar; Manju Dharman; Harison
- Presented by: Bhavachithra
- Starring: Gayatri Arun; Vivek Gopan
- Narrated by: Prof. Aliyaar
- Theme music composer: Saanadh George
- Opening theme: "Naara Na Naara"(Removed in circa 2014)
- Ending theme: "Hea Hea Hei" (Removed in circa 2014)
- Composer: Rajeev Aattukal
- Country of origin: India
- Original language: Malayalam
- No. of episodes: 1524

Production
- Producer: Jayakumar Bhavachithra
- Cinematography: Manoj Kumar
- Editor: Rajesh Thrissure
- Camera setup: Multi-camera
- Running time: 22 minutes
- Production company: Ross Petals

Original release
- Network: Asianet
- Release: 22 July 2013 – 31 August 2018

Related
- Diya Aur Baati Hum

Parasparam (transl. Each Other) is an Indian Malayalam television thriller series that was broadcast on Asianet. It is an official remake of Star Plus's serial Diya Aur Baati Hum. The series premiered on 22 July 2013. It stars Gayatri Arun and Vivek Gopan and was produced by Ross Petals. The last episode aired on 31 August 2018 with 1,524 episodes and is first soap opera to cross 1500 episodes in Malayalam.

== Plot ==
Deepti pursues her dream of becoming an IPS officer for her father. Sooraj, a partially-educated and simple young master-confectioner is the perfect elder heir to his middle-class traditional family.

Deepti's dreams and aspirations are destroyed as she loses her parents in an accident. Planning to move abroad, her brother Gopan fixes her marriage to Sooraj whose strict yet loving mother Padmavathi "Padmam" wants her daughter-in-law to be simple and not well-educated, with the excellent skills of a homemaker. After discovering this, Gopan lies about Deepti's education level to ensure her settlement. Deepti gives up her education and dreams, accepting her roles as a wife and the elder daughter-in-law of the family. Soon, as her truth of being educated and not knowing cooking is revealed, Padmam banishes her. Sooraj stands up for Deepti and vows to teach her everything she must know to prepare herself as the daughter-in-law that Padmam expects. Deepti starts caring for Sooraj and helps him in various situations including an international confection competition in Singapore. Later, Sooraj helps Deepti complete her studies. Eventually, he convinces Padmam to accept Deepti and her dreams. Deepti faces great challenges in the IPS Academy, establishing herself as an extraordinary police officer.

As a police officer, Deepti fights various criminals including terrorist leaders, while in the meantime, solving her various family problems as she struggles to balance between her professional duties and domestic responsibilities. Together with Sooraj, Deepti forms a deep relationship with underlying love, until misunderstandings tear them apart. But it gets cleared up and they reunite. Deepti donates one of her kidneys to Padmam battling for life which is unknown to the family. Gopan's little son Nandu greatly eagers for a sibling but his wife Sandhya miscarries and is unable to conceive again. Expecting twins, Deepti and Sooraj decide to give their one twin to Sandhya on Nandu's demand. Later, Sooraj and Padmam learn that Deepti is her kidney donor. Deepti delivers her twin sons Dhirav and Dhyaan. The infants are kidnapped in order to be sold. In the ensuing rescue actions, Dhirav is saved and Dhyaan is believed to have succumbed to his death shattering all. A police officer saves Dhyaan though and returns him promptly.

=== 9 years later ===
Deepti and Sooraj live happily with Dhirav however her brother cut all ties with Deepti as he believes her initial instinct was to save Dhirav and not Dhyaan. Soon, Dhyaan discovers his true parents but hates them for giving him away. Eventually, Gopan and Sandhya realises their mistake and gives Dhyan to Deepti and Sooraj.

=== Climax ===
Deepti and Sooraj unsuccessfully try a trap for the terrorists and punish them. The leader makes Deepti and Sooraj eat a bomb pills. Deepti and Sooraj bid their farewell to family and others by taking a boat and embracing. They boat explodes killing Deepti and Sooraj before the setting Sun, highlighting that even death cannot separate them.

== Cast ==
=== Main cast ===
- Gayatri Arun as Commissioner Deepthi Aravind IPS (Voice dubbed by Devi S.): Aravind and Kanchana's daughter; Gopan's sister; Sooraj's wife; Dhirav and Dhyaan's mother.
- Vivek Gopan as Padippuraveettil Sooraj Krishnan (Voice dubbed by Shankar Lal): Padmam's and Krishnan's eldest son; Suresh, Subash and Suchitra's brother; Deepthi's husband; Dhirav and Dhyaan's father and a bakery owner
- Rekha Ratheesh as Padippuraveettil Padmavathi "Padmam" Krishnan: Krishnan's wife; Sooraj, Suresh, Subash and Suchitra's mother; Ann, Aryan, Dhirav and Dhyaan's grandmother
- Pradeep as Padippuraveettil Krishnan: Muthashi's son; Padmam's husband, Sooraj, Suresh, Subash and Suchitra's father; Ann, Aryan, Dhirav and Dhyaan's grandfather
- Sreenath Swaminathan as Padippuraveettil Suresh Krishnan: Padmam and Krishnan's second son; Sooraj, Subash and Suchitra's brother; Meenakshi's husband; Ann's father
- Sneha Diwakar as Meenakshi Suresh: Vasantha's elder daughter; Meera's sister; Suresh's wife; Ann's mother
- Gautam Praveen as Dhirav Sooraj: Deepthi and Sooraj's elder son; Dhyaan's twin brother; Ann, Aryan and Nandu's cousin
- Leswin as Dhyaan Sooraj: Deepthi and Sooraj's younger son; Dhirav's twin brother; Ann, Aryan and Nandu's cousin
- Muhammad Rafi as Sabir IPS : Deepthi's close friend and colleague

=== Recurring cast ===
- Niranj Menon / Manu Martin Pallippadan / Naren Eswar as Subash Krishnan: Padmam and Krishnan's youngest son; Sooraj, Suresh and Suchitra's brother; Smriti's husband; Aryan's father
- Lekshmi Pramod / Chilanka as Smriti Subash, Subash's wife and Aryan's mother
- Revathi Krishana / Ruby Jewel as Suchitra Dileep: Padmam and Krishnan's daughter; Sooraj, Suresh and Subash's sister; Dileep's wife
- Sabari Chandran as Dileep: Suchitra's husband
- Amika Mariyam as Ann Suresh: Meenakshi and Suresh's daughter; Aryan, Dhirav and Dhyaan's cousin
- Darshan D Nair as Aryan Subash: Smriti and Subash's son; Ann, Dhirav and Dhyaan's cousin
- Divya Prabha as Roma, Deepthi's close friend
- Valsala Menon as Krishnan's mother; Sooraj, Suresh, Subash and Suchitra's grandmother; Ann, Aryan, Dhirav and Dhyaan's great-grandmother
- Vijay Viswanathan / Hari Gopinath as Gopan Aravind: Aravind and Kanchana's son; Deepthi's brother; Sandya's husband; Nandu's father
- Divya Nithin / Indulekha as Sandya Gopan: Gopan's wife; Nandu's mother
- Ashik C R as Nandu Gopan: Gopan and Sandya's son; Dhirav and Dhyaan's cousin
- Shobha Mohan as Devika
- Shobi Thilakan as SI Dhanapalan, a corrupt pollice officer
- Kollam Thulasi as Rishikesh
- Manu Varma as Thomas
- Dileep Shankar as Cherian
- Ashraf Pezhumoodu as Advocate
- Anu Gopi as Kokku, Sooraj's sidekick
- Poojappura Radhakrishnan
- Jolly Easow as Vasantha: Meera and Meenakshi's mother
- Apsara as Rasiya Sabir
- Irfan as Appu
  - Adil Mohammed replaced Irfan as Appu
- Thanvi S Raveendran as Jennifer Hills/Merin/Vineetha
- Ardra Das as Athira
- Navya Narayan as Prema
- Akshaya R. Nair as Disha
- Anitha Nair as Maya
- Sarath Swamy as Jeevan
- Althara as Kavitha
- Anitta Dcruz as Nitha
- Sruthy Suresh as Nandana/Anupama
- Soniya Baiju Kottarakkara as Rabiya
- Snehalatha as Kalyani
- Suki Pandalam as Shyamkumar
- Meghna as Keerthana
- Sreekala as Broker
- Priya as Kanchana, Deepthi's and Gopan's mother and Aravind's wife
- Sajith as Aravindan
- Maya Moushmi as Deepthi's aunt
- Faisal Mohammed as Advocate
- Sreekanth as Terrorist
- Lavanya
- Omana Ouseph
- Nandana Gowri
- Sindhu Varma as Kathreena
- Riyas Narmakala as Thakkol Vasu
- Mahima as Nanditha Mukherjee
- Karthika Kannan
- Jeeja Surendran
- Uma Devi Nair
- Sumi Santhosh
- Santhosh Krishna
- Vanchiyoor Praveen Kumar
- Sree Padma
- Vindhuja Vikraman

=== Guest appearances ===
- Aswathy as Amala
- Amith as Jithan
- Shelly Kishore as Shalini

== Awards ==
=== 7th Asianet Television Awards 2014 ===
- Best Serial – Parasparam (Producer Jayakumar)
- Best Screenplay – Pradeep Panicker
- Best Actor – Vivek Gopan
- Best Actress – Rekha Ratheesh
- Best New Face (female) – Gayatri Arun
- Best Actor in Negative Role – Shobi
- Best Actor in Character Role – [Pradeep]
- Special Jury Awards (Negative Role) – Sneha
- Best Audiographer (Sabda Mishram) – Sreejith V.G
- Lifetime Achievement Award- Valsala Menon
- Best Dubbing Artist (male) – Sankar Lal
- Best Dubbing Artist (female) – Nithuna

=== 8th Asianet Television Awards 2015 ===
- Outstanding Hit serial - Parasparam
- Best Actress - Gayatri Arun
- Popular Actor - Vivek Gopan
- Character Actress - Rekha Ratheesh
- Best Dialogues - Gireesh Gramika
- Special Jury Award (Negative Role) - Sneha
- Special Jury Award (Director) - Manjudharman
- Best Serial - Parasparam
- Popular Actress - Gayatri Arun
- Youth icon - Vivek Gopan
- Character Actress - Rekha Ratheesh
- Best Script Writer - Gireesh Gramika
- Best dubbing Artist (Female) - Devi S.

=== 9th Asianet Television Awards 2016 ===
- Best serial - Parasparam
- Popular Actress - Gayatri Arun
- Youth icon - Vivek Gopan
- Character Actress - Rekha Ratheesh
- Best Videographer - Manoj kumar
- Best Editor - Rajesh Thrishur
- Best Audiographer - Sreejith V.G
- Best Script Writer - Girish Gramika
- Best dubbing Artist (Female) - Devi S.

=== 10th Asianet Television Awards 2017 ===
- Longest Running Serial - Parasparam
- Best Star pair - Vivek & Gayathri
- Iconic beauty - Gayatri Arun
- Character Actress - Rekha Ratheesh
- Best Audiographer - Sreejith V.G
- Best Editor - Rajesh Thrishur
- Best Dubbing Artist (male) - Sankar Lal

=== 11th Asianet Television Awards 2018 ===
- Evergreen hit Serial - Parasparam
- Best Actress - Gayatri Arun
- Best Director - Harison
- Character Actor - Parasparam Pradeep
- Special Jury Award (Popular Actor) - Vivek Gopan
- Special Jury Award (Character Actress) - Rekha Ratheesh

=== Asiavision Television Awards ===
- Best Pair - Vivek & Gayathri

== Reception ==
=== Critics ===
Deccan Chronicle stated, "The serial Parasparam came as a breath of fresh air among the usual unending tear-jerkers; the main attraction was the fearless and clever IPS Deepthi who took on criminals single-handedly and became a role model for many youngsters."

=== Impact ===
A post where the still of the lead pairs before a bomb explosion sequence went viral which was falsely claimed as Kerala IPS officer and husband were killed by ISIS jehadis. This was reported as accusing Pinarayi Vijayan led Kerala government for their inefficiency.

== Adaptations ==
Language	Title	Original release	Network(s)	Last aired	Notes
Hindi	Diya Aur Baati Hum दिया और बाती हम	29 August 2011	StarPlus	10 September 2016	Original
Bengali	Tomay Amay Mile তোমায় আমায় মিলে	11 March 2013	Star Jalsha	20 March 2016	Remake
Malayalam	Parasparam പരസ്പരം	22 July 2013	Asianet	31 August 2018	Remake
Marathi	Phulala Sugandha Maticha फुलाला सुगंध मातीचा	2 September 2020	Star Pravah	4 December 2022	Remake
Tamil	Raja Rani 2 ராஜா ராணி 2	12 October 2020	Star Vijay	21 March 2023	Remake
Telugu	Janaki Kalaganaledu జానకి కలగలేదు	22 March 2021	Star Maa	19 August 2023	Remake
