= Aksharathettu (TV series) =

Indian Malayalam television series

- Genre: Family Drama; Romance
- Developed by: Sunil K Anand (Suryakanthi)
- Written by: N Vinu Narayanan
- Directed by: Harrison; Arul Rasan; Sreejith Paleri
- Starring: Ishani Gosh
- Country of origin: India
- Original language: Malayalam
- No. of seasons: 2
- No. of episodes: 77 (Aksharathettu), 84 (Suryakanthi)

Production
- Executive producer: Dr. Vinod S
- Producer: Jayakumar Bhavachitra
- Camera setup: Multi-camera
- Running time: 22 minutes
- Production company: Ross Petals

Original release
- Network: Mazhavil Manorama
- Release: 6 July – 6 November 2020

Aksharathettu (transl. Spelling Mistake) is an Indian Malayalam television series broadcast on Mazhavil Manorama since 6 July 2020. Ishani Ghosh and Dharish Jayaseelan are the main protagonists of the series.

From 26 October 2020 this series was merged with Suryakanthi (transl. Sunflower) which premiered in the channel from 17 August 2020.

Shalu Kurian received the Kerala State TV award for second-best actress for the show Aksharathettu. Ambootti won the award for best male dubbing artiste for Aksharathettu and Suryakanthi.

== Plot ==
Lakshmi Sivasankar goes to Madras to pursue a career in the film industry, where she meets Ramkumar, a popular actor. Their relationship progresses and Lakshmi becomes pregnant with Ramkumar's child. Soon he abandons her and Lakshmi gives birth to a son. Believing that the child is born dead, Lakshmi resumes her career and seeks vengeance on Ramkumar. Due to his influence, she struggles in the film industry but manages to bag a challenging role of a mute girl in a film by director Zakhir. She now takes the name Jayalakshmi and believes the film will be a hit. On the other hand, Karan and Arjun, two street boys, find Lakshmi's son and raise him with the help of a poor family. The boys use him to beg for money. Ramkumar marries the daughter of the chief minister, Malarmathi who is now aware of Ramkumar's illegitimate child. Lakshmi and Ramkumar discover that their son is alive, and Ramkumar seeks to kill him. Malarmathi hires a private detective agency to find the child before Ramkumar and bribes some people to badmouth Lakshmi and Zakhir so that they marry.

== Cast ==
=== Aksharathettu ===
- Ishani Gosh as Lakshmi
- Dharish Jayaseelan as Ramkumar
- Rafi as Zakeer
- Shalu Kurian as Rani Akka
- Mahalakshmi as Malarmathi
- Rekha Ratheesh as Vasundhara Devi
- Jose as Justice Shivashankar
- Om Kanojiya as Karan
- Joshua Parisutham as Arjun
- Bindu Krishna as Alakananda

=== Sooryakanthi ===
- Shirin as Vaiga
- Subramanian Gopalakrishnan as Varun
- Vinayak as Vishal
- Kannur Vasutty as Sooryanarayanan
- Balan Parakkal as Vijaya Varma
- Vyjayanthi as Bhanumathi
- Sabitha Nair as Kokila
- Harsha Nair as Mrudula
- Maya Viswanath
- Ramesh Kotttayam as Vishwanathan
- Krishnaprasad as Ashokan
- Lekshmipriya as Megha
- Vijay Induchoodan as Surya
- Lakshmi Prasad as Hema Sumesh
- Vismaya as Swapna Sumesh
- Ishani Gosh as Lakshmi
- Jose as Justice Shivashankar
- Bindu Krishna as Alakananda
- Stelna
