= Mahatma Gandhi National Foundation =

The Mahatma Gandhi National Foundation, Kerala, founded in December 2000, is aimed at propagating the ideals and perpetuating the memory of Mahatma Gandhi, father of nation. Mahatma Gandhi National Foundation (MGNF) is a mission of collective action to provide better future to the most vulnerable sections of Kerala Society - women, children, disabled persons the aged and other disadvantaged groups - by providing educational training, protecting their health and environment, improving their living condition and strengthening their family and community.

The paradigms of MGNF revolves around five crucial elements, research and development on science and technology for the dissemination of eco-friendly rural technology to the poor, human resource development, attitudinal change and self-management, and economic empowerment to the poor. "Development can be self-sustaining only if it brings about a change in the entire socio-economic matrix governing the lives of the poor" says Shri. Eby J. Jose the Chairman of NGO.

== National level lecture series ==
The Foundation is organising a national level lecture series to be held annually in different metropolitan cities of India.

== National integration symposia and seminars ==
Foundation organised 11 seminars and 5 symposia in different parts of the state. It provides opportunity to hundreds of youths and adolescents to channelise their voluntary human resources towards national integration. Foundation published pamphlets and articles on nationalism in Kerala context.

== National awards ==
Awards were given to demonstrably excellent work done by prominent personalities of Kerala in different fields of development activities and social service Award was given to eminent personalities.

== Skill for adolescents out of school ==
Adolescent is a period of physical, psychological and social maturity from childhood to adulthood, extended from the onset of puberty to the attainment of full reproductive maturity. In India, there are 190 million adolescents comprising one sixth of population. In Kerala, adolescent girls are often subjected to sexploitation and so we organised 7 awareness campaigns to prevent sexploitation and provident skill training on different trades.
