= Aswamedham (TV series) =

Malayalam TV quiz programme

- Logo used since 2024
- Created by: Kairali TV
- Presented by: G. S. Pradeep
- Country of origin: India
- No. of seasons: 3
- No. of episodes: 1500

Production
- Production locations: Thiruvananthapuram (Kerala, Trivandrum)
- Running time: 30 mins (season 3)

Original release
- Network: Kairali TV
- Release: 2001 – 2006
- Release: 2014 – 2014
- Release: 23 September 2024 – May 28, 2025

Aswamedham is a reverse quiz programme on Kairali TV, a Malayalam channel, in the format of twenty questions. It was one of the most successful programmes on Kairali TV and has won many awards. This programme, anchored by "Grandmaster" G. S. Pradeep, has entered the Limca Book of Records for reaching 500 episodes. The second part of the programme was started in November 2005 on Kairali TV. The Aswamedham set features a galloping horse on a rotating pedestal. Some surveys conducted in the libraries of Kerala during 2005 indicated that Aswamedham has played a vital role in enhancing the reading habits of Malayali youth.

The Tamil channel Vijay TV aired the Tamil version of the programme starting in June 2006 under the name Grandmaster with Pradeep and Shilpa Kavalam as the anchor. Shakthi TV is also airing the Tamil version of Aswamedham with Sinhalese subtitles and is titled as Shakthi Grandmaster.

Aswamedham is noted for its focus on knowledge-based competition and its structured format. The show has been described as one of the channel's successful programmes and has gained popularity among viewers for its emphasis on intellectual engagement.

In literature, Aswamedham also refers to a drama of the same name written by Thoppil Bhasi.
