= Devi S. =

Indian actress and dubbing artist

- Born: Cherukodu Peyad, Thiruvananthapuram, Kerala, India
- Occupations: Actor; voice artist; dancer
- Years active: 1988–present

Devi S. is an Indian dubbing artist and actress who works in Malayalam films and television serials.

She became popular through the main character Kunjipengal she played in Oru Kudayum Kunju Pengalum, a serial on Doordarshan. She has dubbed for around 500 movies and acted in more than 25 movies. She received the National Film Award for Best Non-Feature Film Narration / Voice Over in the Non Feature Film Category in 2014 for Nithya Kalyani – Oru Mohiniyattam Patham. Currently, she has dubbed for more than 100 television soap operas.

== Personal life ==
She is married to Alwin, an engineer. The couple has a daughter, Aathmaja.

== Awards ==
=== National Film Awards ===
- 2014 - National Film Award for Best Non-Feature Film Narration / Voice Over - Nithyakalyani oru Mohiniyatta padam

=== Kerala State Film Awards ===
- 2021-Best Dubbing Artist(Female)-Drishyam 2

=== Kerala State Television Awards ===
- 2012 -Best Dubbing Artist(s)- Male/Female Voice - Ramayanam, Swavinte Makal
- 2009 -Best Dubbing Artist(s)- Male/Female Voice - Aranazhikaneram
- 1993 - Best Child Artist - Oru kudayum kunjupengalum

=== Kerala Film Critics Awards ===
- 2010 - Best Dubbing Artist - Karayilekku Oru Kadal Dooram

=== Asianet Television Awards ===
- 2013 - Best Dubbing Artist - Kumkumapoovu
- 2014 - Best Dubbing Artist - Sthreedhanam
- 2016 - Best Dubbing Artist - Sthreedhanam, Parasparam
- 2017 - Best Dubbing Artist - Vanambadi, Parasparam, Bharya
- 2019-Best Dubbing Artist - Vanambadi, Kasthooriman

=== Youth Rathna Awards ===
- 2011 - Best Dubbing - Traffic, Beautiful

== Filmography ==
=== As actress ===
- Arayannangalude Veedu (2000)
- Njangal Santhushtaranu (1999)
- Kottaram Veettile Apputtan (1998)
- Aniyathi
- Saadaram (1996)
- Samooham (1993)
- Daivathinte Vikrithikal (1992)

=== As dubbing artist ===
Child Artists	Swaroopam (1992); Johnny (1993); Minnaram (1994); Sammohanam (1994); Swaham (1994)
Padmapriya	Yes Your Honour (2006) : Character - Maya Ravishankar; Anchil Oral Arjunan (2007) : Character - Pavithra; Kana Kanmani (2009) : Character - Maya; Kutty Srank (2010) : Character - Revamma; Seniors (2011) : Character - Indu; Naayika (2011) : Character - Young Gracy; Cobra (2012) : Character - Sherly; Poppins (2012) : Character - Kantha; Ladies and Gentleman (2013) : Character - Jyothi Alias Jo
Kavya Madhavan	Oral Mathram (1997) : Character - Gopika Menon; Chakkara Muthu (2006) : Character - Anitha; Banaras (2009) : Character - Amritha; China Town (2011) : Character - Rosamma
Karthika Mathew	Aparichithan (2004) : Character - Simi; Athishayan (2007) : Character - Collector Anitha Williams; Shambu (2008) : Character - Meera
Bhavana	Youth Festival (2004) : Character - Mridula; Amrutham (2004) : Character - Parvathy; Hridayathil Sookshikkan (2005) : Character - Amrutha; Kisan (2006) : Character - Kilimathi; Happy Husbands (2010) : Character - Krishnendu Mukundan Menon; Trivandrum Lodge (2012) : Character - Malavika
Sandra Amy	Junior Senior (2005)
Sneha	Fighter (2005) : Character - Anjali; Shikkar (2010) : Character - Kaveri
Lakshmi Sharma	Palunku (2006) : Character - Susamma; Passenger (2009) : Character - Gayathri; Parayan Marannathu (2009) : Character - Rema; Karayilekku Oru Kadal Dooram (2010) : Character - Devi
Genelia D'Souza	Happy (Malayalam Version) (2006) : Character - Madhumathi Alias Madhu; Urumi (2011) : Character - Arakkal Ayesha & Urmila
Meena	Kadha Parayumbol (2007) : Character - Sreedevi Balachandran; Drishyam (2013) : Character - Rani George; Munthirivallikal Thalirkkumbol (2017) : Character - Annyamma Alias Aamy; Shylock (2020) : Character - Lakshmi Ayyanar; Drishyam 2 (2021) : Character - Rani George; Bro Daddy (2022) : Character - Annamma John Kattadi; Anandapuram Diaries (2024) : Character - Advocate Nandini
Hansika Motwani	Hero the Real Hero (2007) : Character - Vaishali
Gopika	Veruthe Oru Bharya (2008) : Character - Bindu Sugunan; Swantham Lekhakan (2009) : Character - Vimala; Bharya Athra Pora (2013) : Character - Priya Sathyanathan
Rambha	Payum Puli (2007) : Character - Mallika; Kabadi Kabadi (2008) : Character - Pooja & Sneha
Kaniha	Kerala Varma Pazhassi Raja (2009) : Character - Kaitheri Makkam; My Big Father (2009) : Character - Ancy; Mylanchi Monchulla Veedu (2014) : Character - Wahida
Bhumika Chawla	Bhramaram (2009); Middle Class Appavi (2017)
Priyamani	Puthiya Mukham (2009)
Raai Laxmi	2 Harihar Nagar (2009)
Muktha	Kancheepurathe Kalyanam (2009)
Shilpa Bala	Orkkuka Vallappozhum (2009)
Kripa	Bhoomi Malayalam (2009)
Mangala	Rahasya Police (2009)
Jyothirmayi	Janakan (2010)
Mithra Kurian	Raama Raavanan (2010)
Dhanya Mary Varghese	Karayilekku Oru Kadal Dooram (2010)
Sandhya	Sahasram (2010)
Radhika	In Ghost House Inn (2010)
Sarayu Mohan	Kanyakumari Express (2010)
Lena	Traffic (2011); Ayaal (2013)
Meghna Raj	Beautiful (2011); Madirasi (2012); Namukku Parkkan (2012); Up & Down: Mukalil Oralundu (2013); Good Bad & Ugly (2013); 100 Degree Celsius (2014); Hallelooya (2016)
Ananya	Doctor Love (2011); Sandwich (2011)
Mythili	Salt N' Pepper (2011); Mayamohini (2012); Cowboy (2013); Breaking News Live (2013)
Honey Rose	Uppukandam Brothers: Back in Action (2011)
Mamta Mohandas	Padmasree Bharat Dr. Saroj Kumar (2012); Paisa Paisa (2013)
Anumol	Vedivazhipadu (2013); CID Ramachandran Retd. SI (2024)
Amala Paul	Romeo & Juliet (2013); Ratsasan (Malayalam Version) (2018)
Lakshmi Menon	Avatharam (2014)
Nisha Aggarwal	Cousins (2014)
Aparna Gopinath	Charlie (2015)
Kamalinee Mukherjee	Pulimurugan (2016)
Sheelu Abraham	Aadupuliyattam (2016)
Ineya	Girls (2016)
Catherine Tresa	Rudramadevi (Malayalam Version )(2015); Yodhhavu (2016)
Nayanthara	Iru Mugan (Malayalam Version) (2016); Arram (Malayalam Version) (2017); Kolamavu Kokila (Malayalam Version) (2018); Imaikkaa Nodigal (Malayalam Version) (2018); Airaa (Malayalam Version) (2019)
Lakshmi Gopalaswamy	Symphony (2004); Mathai Kuzhappakkaranalla (2014); Kambhoji (2017)
Aditi Rao Hydari	Duet (2017)
Jyothika	Kaatrin Mozhi (Malayalam Version) (2018); Raatchasi (Malayalam Version) (2019)
Trisha Krishnan	'96 (Malayalam Version) (2018)
Malavika Avinash	K.G.F: Chapter 1 (Malayalam Version) (2018)
Ramya Krishnan	Aakasha Ganga 2 (2019)
Ragini Dwivedi	Face to Face (2012)
Poonam Bajwa	Manthrikan (2012)
Neha Sharma	Cheetah (2007)
Bhanu Sri Mehra	Varan (2010)
Kaveri	Kangaroo (2007)
Malavika Nair	Black Butterfly (2013)
Aishwarya Rai Bachchan	Ponniyin Selvan: I (Malayalam Version) (2022)
Sindhu Menon	Akashathile Paravakal (2001); Twenty Twenty (2008)
Jomol	Oru Vadakkan Veeragatha (1989) : Character - Young Unniyarcha
Rehana Navas	Thalolam (1998) : Character - Seetha

== Television ==
=== As actress ===
- Annathe Naadakam
- Oru Kudayum Kunju Pengalum (DD)
- Velu Maalu Circus
- Mahathma Gandhi Colony

=== As dubbing artist ===
Serial	Dubbed for	Character	Channel
Oru Kudayum Kunju Pengalum	Devi & Child artist	Chellamani	DD Malayalam
Jungle Book		Mowgli	
Sahadharmini	Jomol	Thamara	Asianet
Kudumbini	Sreeja Chandran	Shyama	Asianet
Swantham	Chandra Lakshman	Sandra	Asianet
Omanathinkalpakshi	Lena	Jancy	Asianet
Orma		Mehreen	Asianet
Kadamattathu Kathanar	Sukanya	Neeli	Asianet
Krishnakripasagaram	Sreelaya	Radha	Amritha TV
Samadooram	Renjini Krishna		Asianet
Suryaputri	Renjini Krishna		Asianet
Kanakkinavu	Sujitha	Archana Sharath/Achu	Surya TV
Unniyarcha	Tharika	Archa	Asianet
Swami Ayyappan	Sukanya	Maharani	Asianet
Manasaputhri	Archana Susheelan	Glory	Asianet
Swami Ayyappan Saranam	Meenakumari	Maharani	Asianet
Swamiye Saranam Ayyappa	Seena Antony	Ambika	Surya TV
Sreekrishnaleela			Asianet
Aranazhikaneram			Amritha TV
Alphonsamma	Ashwathy	Alphonsamma	Asianet
Parijatham	Rasna	Seema & Anuradha	Asianet
Mazhayariyathe	Chandra Lakshman	Meera	Surya TV
Kudumbayogam	Renjini Krishna		Surya TV
Sreemahabhagavatham	Sreekala Sasidharan & Yuvarani	Rukmini & Yashoda	Asianet
Devimahatmyam	Lakshmi Sharma & Sujitha	Shakambari & Devi	Asianet
Harichandanam	Sujitha	Unnimaya	Asianet
Mattoruval	Vani Viswanath	Annie	Surya TV
Indraneelam	Nithya Das	Geethu	Surya TV
Parayi petta pantirukulam	Sreekala Sasidharan	Karaikkal Ammaiyar	Surya TV
Sneehatheeram	Sreekala Sasidharan		Surya TV
Devimahathmyam	Sreekala Sasidharan	Devi	Asianet
Autograph	Swapna Treasa	Soosanna	Asianet
Kumkumapoovu	Aswathy	Amala	Asianet
Kadha Ethuvare	Rohini	herself	Mazhavil Manorama
Agniputhri	Stephy Leon	Annie	Asianet
Amma	Archana Susheelan	Mallika	Asianet
Chandralekha		Chandra	Asianet
Malakhamar	Praveena	Agnes	Mazhavil Manorama
Manasaveena	Lakshana	Veena	Mazhavil Manorama
Aakashadoothu	Meera Krishna	Krishna	Surya TV
Paatukalude Paatu	Ambili Devi	Varsha	Surya TV
Ammakili	Archana Susheelan	Devika	Asianet
Vrindavanam	Rasna	Meera	Asianet
Nandanam	Rasna	Meera	Asianet
Rudhraveena	Sona Nair	Ambika	Surya TV
Ramayanam	Mahalakshmi	Seetha	Mazhavil Manorama
Saivinte Makkal			Mazhavil Manorama
Hridayam Sakshi	Varada	Bhama	Mazhavil Manorama
Panchagni	Rasna		Kairali TV
Aayirathil Oruval	Sreekutty		Mazhavil Manorama
Sarayu	Seena Antony	Sarayu	Surya TV
Sthreedhanam	Divya Padmini	Divya	Asianet
Indira	Sujitha / Gayathri Arun	Indira	Mazhavil Manorama
Oru Penninte kadha	Indu Thampi		Mazhavil Manorama
Makal		Janaki	Surya TV
Avalude Kadha	Indu Thampi		Surya TV
Ival Yamuna	Anjana Haridas/ Archana Suseelan	Yamuna	Mazhavil Manorama
Innale	Rasna	Mother, daughter	Surya TV
Bhagyadevatha	Sreelaya	Bhagyalekshmi	Mazhavil Manorama
Aniyathi	Gauri Krishnan	Gowri	Mazhavil Manorama
Balamani	Devika Nambiar	Balamani	Mazhavil Manorama
Amala	Varada	Amala	Mazhavil Manorama
Kanmani	Sreelaya		Surya TV
Parasparam	Gayatri Arun	Commissioner Deepthi IPS	Asianet
Ishtam	Stephy Leon	Gayathri	Surya TV
Nirakoottu	Archana Suseelan		Kairali TV
Nirapakkitu	Archana Suseelan		MediaOne TV
Dhathuputhri	Swasika	Kanmani	Mazhavil Manorama
Bandhuvaru Shatruvaru	Dr.Divya	Lakshmi	Mazhavil Manorama
Chandanamazha	Shalu Kurian	Varsha	Asianet
Balaganapathy	Souparnika Subhash	Sunitha	Asianet
Ente Pennu	Vidhya Mohan/Leena Nair	Bhama	Mazhavil Manorama
Karuthamuthu	Renu	Karthu	Asianet
Sundari	Shafna	Gadha	Mazhavil Manorama
Manassariyathe	Ashwathy		Surya TV
Pranayam	Remya/ Varada/ Divya	Lakshmi	Asianet
Vazhve Mayam	Archana Susheelan		DD Malayalam
Sangamam	Neenu Karthika/Sujitha	Ancy	Surya TV
Moonumani	Seena Antony	Seetha	Flowers TV
Vivahitha	Stephy Leon	Devanthi	Mazhavil Manorama
Ponnambili	Malavika Wales	Ponnu	Mazhavil Manorama
Eeran Nilavu	Sarayu	Nandhana	Flowers TV
My Marumakan	Swasika	Aishwarya	Surya TV
Eeshwaran Sakshiyayi	Divya Prabha	Aparna	Flowers TV
Manjurukum Kaalam	Monisha Arshak/Nikitha Rajesh	Janaki	Mazhavil Manorama
Vishwaroopam	Suchitra Nair	Devi	Flowers TV
Kalyanasougandhikam	Suchitra Nair		Asianet
Malooty	Swapna Thomas	Maya	Mazhavil Manorama
Bharya	Sonu/Mridula Vijay	Rohini	Asianet
Athmasakhi	Avanthika Mohan	Dr.Nanditha	Mazhavil Manorama
Chinthavishtayaya Seetha	Swasika	Seetha	Asianet
Sahayathrika	Shafna	Madhumita	Surya TV
Sagaram Sakshi	Stephy Leon	Bhadra	Surya TV
Rathri Mazha	Sreekala Sasidharan	Archana	Flowers TV
Moonu Pennungal	Sandra Amy	Sethulakshmi	Surya TV
Mangalyapattu	Rini Raj	Maina	Mazhavil Manorama
Pranayini	Shruthy Bala	Mili	Mazhavil Manorama
Vanambadi	Chippy & Suchithra	Nandini & Padmini	Asianet
Seetha	Swasika	Seetha	Flowers TV
Ammuvinte Amma	Malavika Wales	Anupama	Mazhavil Manorama
Sthreepadham	Shelly Kishore	Bala	Mazhavil Manorama
Karuthamuthu	Rini Raj	Balachandrika	Asianet
Premam	Jennifer Winget also promo	Maya	Surya TV
Nokketha Doorathu	Shafna	Suhara	Mazhavil Manorama
Maamattikutty	Divya Padmini	Sandra	Flowers TV
Naagakanyaka - 2	Mouni Roy	Shivangi	Surya TV
Sreemurugan	Priya Prince	Goddess Parvathy	Asianet
Kathoorimaan	Rebecca Santhosh	Kavya	Asianet
Arundhathi	Meera Muralidharan	Arundhathi	Flowers TV
Sree bhadrakali	Pooja Sharma	Mahakali	Surya TV
Agnisakshi	Sonu	Indraja Varma	Surya TV
Dr.Ram		Dr.Sara	Mazhavil Manorama
Bhagyajathakam	Shafna	Indulekha	Mazhavil Manorama
Seethakalyanam	Dhanya Mary Varghese	Seetha	Asianet
Thenum Vayambum	Sreelaya	Malli	Surya TV
Sabarimala Swami Ayyapan	Latha Rao & Shamna Kasim	Panthalam Maharani & Mohini	Asianet
Arayannagalude veedu	Stephy	Lilly kuriakose	Flowers TV
Kabani	Anjitha	Menaka	Zee Keralam
Pookkalam Varavaayi	Arathi	Sapthathi	Zee Keralam
Thamarathumbi	Divya Yeshodharan	Vaiga	Surya TV
Unnimaya	Vidhya Mohan	Nikitha	Asianet
Bhadra	Seena Antony	Bhadra	Surya TV
Sathya Enna Penkutty	Mersheena Neenu	Sathya	Zee Keralam
Priyapettaval	Avanthika Mohan/ Sreelaya	Uma	Mazhavil Manorama
Ente Maathavu	Sarayu	Helen	Surya TV
Mounaragam	Padmini Jagadeesh	Deepa	Asianet
Kudumbavilakku	Meera Vasudevan	Sumithra	Asianet
Jeevithanouka	Maneesha	Ashwathy	Mazhavil Manorama
Ammayariyathe	Sreethu Krishnan	Alina	Asianet
Padatha Painkili	Anjitha	Swapna	Asianet
Santhwanam	Chippy	Sreedevi	Asianet
Raakuyil	Archana Nair / Devika Nambiar	Thulasi	Mazhavil Manorama
Swantham Sujatha	Chandra Lakshman	Sujatha	Surya TV
Ente Maathavu	Shelly Kishore	Jeena Kuriakose	Surya TV
Manam Pole Mangalyam	Swasika	Nila	Zee Keralam
Moodalmanju	Varada Jishin	Shyama	Flowers TV
Ente Maathavu	Premi Viswanath	Devika	Surya TV
Thoovalsparsham	Avanthika Mohan	Sreya Nandini IPS	Asianet
Kana Kanmani	Abhirami & Ann Mathews	Radhika & Yamuna	Surya TV
Amma Magal	Mithra Kurian	Sangeetha	Zee Keralam
Daya — Chentheeyil Chalicha Kumkumapottu	Pallavi Gowda	Daya	Asianet
Kaliveedu	Rebecca Santhosh	Pooja	Surya TV
Mounaragam	Shweta Menon	Shwetha	Asianet
Seethapennu	Swasika	Seetha	Flowers TV
Swayamvaram	Pallavi Gowda	Sharika Justin	Mazhavil Manorama
Balanum Ramayum	Sreekala Sashidharan	Rema	Mazhavil Manorama
Mazhayethum Munpe	Sreedhanya	Mythili	Amritha TV
Kaathodu Kathoram	Krishna	Meenu	Asianet
Ammakkilikkoodu	Swapna treasa	Nandita	Surya TV
Shyamambaram	Abhirami & Haritha G Nair	Abhirami & Shyama	Zee Keralam
Sudhamani Superaa	Rohini	Mahima	Zee Keralam
Swayamvaram	Pallavi Gowda/Arya Anil	Sharika	Mazhavil Manorama
Mangalyam tantunanena	Shreegopika Chandran/julie hendry zion	Nidhi	Surya TV
Madhuranombarakaattu	Meera Vasudev	Sujatha	Zee Keralam
Meenu's Kitchen	Malavika Wales	Meenu	Mazhavil Manorama
Pavithram	Surabhi Santhosh	Vaiga	Asianet
