= Priyapettaval =

Indian Malayalam television soap opera

- Genre: Soap opera
- Screenplay by: Anu Babu Kattappana
- Directed by: Mohan Kupleri
- Starring: Avanthika Mohan; Rayjan Rajan; Sreelaya
- Voices of: Devi S.
- Music by: Jithin K. Roshan
- Country of origin: India
- Original language: Malayalam
- No. of seasons: 1
- No. of episodes: 159

Production
- Producer: Shobana Umadharan
- Editors: Ajay Prasannan; Ajith Raj Arinelloor
- Camera setup: Multi-camera
- Running time: 20-25 minutes

Original release
- Network: Mazhavil Manorama
- Release: 11 November 2019

Priyapettaval is an Indian Malayalam-language soap opera. The show premiered on 11 November 2019 in Mazhavil Manorama. It stars Avanthika Mohan, Sreelaya and Rayjan Rajan lead roles. It aired on Mazhavil Manorama and on-demand through ManoramaMax.

== Cast ==
=== Main ===
- Avanthika Mohan / Sreelaya as Dr. Uma Maheshwari
- Rayjan Rajan as Dr. Balagopal (Balu)

=== Recurring ===
- George as Deepan
- Reshmi Boban as Maheshwari Devanarayanan (Mahi)
- Manka Mahesh
- Amritha Nair as Meenu
- Boban Alummoodan
- Dayyana Hameed
- Sini Varghese
- Anjo Nair
- Prabha Shankar
- Santhosh K

== Production ==
The show was a comeback for actors Avantika Mohan and Rayjan Rajan who earlier played the lead roles in soap opera Aathmasakhi. Lead actress Avantika Mohan quit the show midway due to COVID-19 outbreak. Sreelaya replaced her.

== Dubbed Version ==
Language	Title	Original release	Network(s)	Last aired
Tamil	Priyatha Varam Vendum பிரியாத வரம் வேண்டும்	24 May 2024	Thanthi One	Ongoing
