= Vascodigama =

- Theatrical release poster
- Directed by: Madhu Chandra
- Written by: Madhu Chandra
- Screenplay by: Madhu Chandra
- Produced by: Ashwin Vijaykumar
- Starring: Kishore; Parvathy Nair; Niranjan BS
- Cinematography: Karm Chawla
- Edited by: Srikanth
- Music by: B. Ajaneesh Loknath
- Production company: Ashwin Creations
- Distributed by: Jayanna Films
- Release date: 23 October 2015
- Running time: 139 minutes
- Country: India
- Language: Kannada

Vascodigama is a 2015 Indian Kannada satirical film written and directed by Madhu Chandra. The plot revolves around the extent to which education system in India holds practically among students, and that the revision of curriculum is obligatory for a healthy teacher-student connect, accentuating the argument that students should lead discerning and forbearing lives rather than being coerced to study only to acquire a degree. It stars Kishore in the lead role as Vascodigama, a Kannada lecturer emphasizing his students on the aforementioned point; and Parvathy Nair as Shanthi, an English lecturer in the same college,. Ashwin Vijaykumar and Suchendra Prasad feature in supporting roles.

Ashwin Vijaykumar also produced the film under his production house Ashwin Creations. The cinematography was done by Karm Chawla, and was edited by Srikanth. The soundtrack was composed by Poornachandra Tejaswi, who collaborated with B. Ajaneesh Loknath to score the background music. The film was released on 23 October 2015 to positive reviews from critics, who acclaimed the theme of the film and the acting performance of Kishore.

== Cast ==
- Kishore as Vasu D. Gamanahalli "Vascodigama"
- Parvathy Nair as Shanthi
- Suchendra Prasad
- Sundar
- Rockline Sudhakar
- Ashwin Vijaykumar
- Niranjan BS as a student
- Ajisha Shah in a special appearance in song "20 20"

== Production ==
Madhu Chandra, who made his debut as a director with the 2012 Kannada film Cyber Yugadol Nava Yuva Madhura Prema Kavyam, announced of directing Vascodigama in early 2013. The Times of India carried a report that Komal was cast to play the role of a college lecturer and the film would be a comedy, carrying "a deeper message on the importance of education". Ashwin Vijaykumar, then recently graduated with an MBA degree, told Bangalore Mirror of his plans of having wanted to enter cinema for two years which materialized with Vascodigama. He produced the film also appearing in a supporting role as a student.

Kishore was cast in Komal's place as the male lead and Parvathy Nair, who had previously appeared in a Kannada film Story Kathe (2013), was cast opposite him as the female lead. Filming was done extensively in Sullia, in the Dakshina Kannada region of Karnataka for 95 days, before completion in March 2015. It was reported in July 2015 that a dancer Ajisha Shah, who had hitherto appeared in an item number in the 2014 Hindi film Happy New Year, filmed with Vascodigama for a dance sequence at Rockline Studio in Bangalore. Niranjan, who is well known for his role as Thiruna on the Tamil serial, Azhagu (TV series) makes his debut in this film.

== Soundtrack ==
Vascodigama

Soundtrack album by Poornachandra Tejaswi
- Released: 9 April 2015
- Genre: Feature film soundtrack
- Length: 24:12
- Label: Lahari Music

Poornachandra Tejaswi composed the film's soundtrack and B. Ajaneesh Loknath, the background score. Lyrics for the soundtrack was written by Madhu Chandra, Shivkumara Swamy and Yogaraj Bhat. The soundtrack album consists of six tracks. It was released officially on 9 April 2015 in Bangalore.

Track listing
No.	Title	Lyrics	Singer(s)	Length
1.	"Sa Re Ga Ma"	Madhu Chandra	Vijay Prakash, Naveen Sajju, Arun M. C.	4:39
2.	"20 20"	Madhu Chandra	Nagalinge Gowda, Bappi Blossom	3:58
3.	"Hello"	Madhu Chandra, Shivkumara Swamy	Bappi Blossom, Naveen Sajju	4:06
4.	"Once More"	Yogaraj Bhat	Poornachandra Tejaswi, Tippu	4:27
5.	"Goli Hodi"	Madhu Chandra	Shankar Mahadevan, Naveen Sajju, Lawrence, Pancham	4:32
6.	"Spider Man"	Madhu Chandra	Bappi Blossom	2:30
Total length:				24:12

== Critical reception ==
Upon theatrical release, the film received positive to mixed reviews from critics. They applauded the theme of the film and the acting performance of Kishore, and criticized the "over-the-top" features of his character.

Reviewing the film for The New Indian Express, A. Sharadhaa wrote, "A not so often-told tale on education gets a good rendering here. It’s also an example of how comedy can be an effective medium in raising awareness about education." and added, "Vascodigama might elicit some mixed reactions. Whether or not they agree with Madhuchandra’s point of view, this film, which also explores the rewards and challenges that come with a lecturer’s position, is sure to get parents and students thinking." She concluded writing praises of the acting performances and cinematography. Shyam Prasad S. of Bangalore Mirror rated the film three out of five, drew comparisons to the 2009 Hindi film 3 Idiots, and wrote, "Unlike its message that asks students to spread their wings, the film confines itself to a restricted visual range." Commending on the acting performance of Kishore, he concluded writing, "The director manages to 'tell' his ideas but all the emotions that needed to be conveyed as part of the package are missing."

Shashiprasad S. M. of Deccan Chronicle rated the film three out of five as well, and wrote "Despite severe flaws, the film is a class apart when compared to the similar ones which are usually preachy and scratchy!". He added, "Vascodigama is likeable for the reason that it does an encouraging job through entertainment". However, S. Vishwanath of Deccan Herald felt the film was "above average", and "[s]illy and sloppy". He wrote, "In trying to achieve his utopian ideal, Madhuchandra lets loose madness which makes for a fun watch if one leaves sense and sensibilities back home."
