= Vachina Vaadu Suryudu =

- Movie poster
- Directed by: Mandava Gopala Krishna
- Written by: Sata Vahana (dialogues)
- Screenplay by: Mandava Gopala Krishna
- Story by: Sata Vahana
- Produced by: Mulpuri Lakshamana Swamy
- Starring: Krishna; Lakshmana Swamy; Vijayachander; Rahul; Lahari; Prasad Babu; Suthi Velu; Vizag Prasad
- Cinematography: M. V. Raghu
- Edited by: Uma Sankara Babu
- Music by: Radha Gopi
- Production company: Jalaja Art Productions
- Release date: 9 August 2002
- Country: India
- Language: Telugu

Vachina Vaadu Suryudu (transl. The one who came is Suryam) is a 2002 Indian Telugu-language action film directed by Mandava Gopala Krishna and starring Lakshmana Swamy, Vijayachander, Rahul, Lahari, Prasad Babu, Suthi Velu and Vizag Prasad while Krishna and Suresh make guest appearances. The film was released to mixed reviews.

== Cast ==
- Krishna as the chief minister (guest appearance)
- Lakshmana Swamy as Major Suryam
- Vijayachander as the freedom fighter
- Rahul as Sankar
- Prasad Babu as Rayudu
- Suthi Velu as Polayya, the sarpanch
- Vizag Prasad as Ramanatham
- Mallikarjuna Rao
- M. S. Narayana as Krishna Rao
- Deekshitulu
- Deepak
- Hema Sundar
- Gundu Hanumantha Rao
- Ananth
- Gautam Raju
- Satya Prakash as the district collector
- AVS as the college principal
- Chitti Babu
- Babu Mohan
- Shashank as Kiran
- Prabha as Rayudu's wife
- Lahari as Gowri
- Swapna
- Padma Jayanti
- Uma Chowdary
- Suresh as Satyam (guest appearance; uncredited)

== Production ==
The film's theme showcases human values, and was shot in six villages in Medak district. Some scenes featuring Rahul and Lahari were shot at a temple in Lakshmapur.

== Release and reception ==
The film was released on 9 August 2002 coinciding with Quit India Movement. Gudipoodi Srihari of The Hindu wrote that "Lakshmana Swamy, the man behind this show, appears to have the leanings of a committed filmmaker". A critic from Full Hyderabad wrote that "The movie has so-so social communiqué, but otherwise collapses under its own stupefying lack of common sense". The film was one of several films from 2002 that were eligible for Nandi Awards in 2003.
