= Thinkal Kalamaan =

2020 Malayalam-language TV series

- Genre: Soap opera; Romance
- Written by: Gireesh Gramika
- Directed by: Shiju Aroor (Episode 1 to 79); Krishnakumar Kudalloor (Episode 80 - present)
- Theme music composer: Sharreth
- Country of origin: India
- Original language: Malayalam
- No. of seasons: 1
- No. of episodes: 394

Production
- Executive producer: Sherry Idayaar
- Producer: Lime Tree Productions
- Cinematography: Priyan
- Editor: Jivin Rexa
- Camera setup: Multi-camera
- Running time: 20-25 minutes
- Production company: Limetree Production

Original release
- Network: Surya TV
- Release: 19 October 2020 – 23 April 2022

Related
- Kundali Bhagya

Thinkal Kalamaan was a 2020 Indian Malayalam-language television soap opera that aired on Surya TV, starring Haritha G Nair, Krishna, and Rayjan Rajan. The show was produced by Lime Tree Productions and directed by Shiju Aroor. The show was loosely based on the Hindi soap opera Kundali Bhagya.

The series portrays the story of a young girl, Keerthi, who finds herself slowly getting involved in a love triangle, which brings unexpected twists and turns in her life.

== Plot ==
Keerthi, the daughter of K.K. Nair and Saraswathi, thinks her mother is dead, and her father left her as a baby after he had an extra-marital affair with another woman. After the birth of Kalyani, Keerthi's half-sister, Sudha began to hate Keerthi. Years later, she finds herself in an unexpected love triangle, which causes her life to change unexpectedly.

== Cast ==
=== Main characters ===
- Haritha G Nair as Keerthi Rahul, a classical dancer and physiotherapist. She is the daughter of K.K Nair and Saraswathi's; Rahul's girlfriend-turned-wife.
- Krishna as Roshan Raveendran Pillai: Swapna's husband; Anjali's ex-husband; Rahul's half-brother; Raveendran and Kalavathy's stepson; and Anupama's biological son.
- Rayjan Rajan as Rahul Raveendran Pillai, a footballer; Roshan's half-brother; Raveendran and Kalavathy's son; and Keerthi's boyfriend turned husband.

=== Other recurring characters ===
- Illekettu Namboothiri as Suvarnan Pillai.
- Shalu Menon as Anupama, a dancer.
- Balachandran Chullikkadu as K.K. Nair
- Sindhu Varma as Saraswathy.
- Bindu Ramakrishnan as Yashoda.
- Rajani Murali as Kalawathi.
- Manoj Kumar as Raveendran.
- Aiswarya Devi (Episode 5 - 26) then Anjali Hari (Episode 27 - present) as Kalyani
- Amrutha S Ganesh as Anjali
- Sarath Swamy as Prem (Episode 63 - present)
- Shilpa Martin as Devika, Roshan's friend
- Dileep Sankar as Arunghosh
- Alis Christy as Swapna Roshan's wife
- Santhosh Pandit as Vivek, Keerthi's proposal
- Ameya Nair as Sub Inspector
- Sruthy Surendran (Manve) as Sunanda
- Disney James as Madhu
- Manoj as Roshan's father
- Vinaya Prasad as Kalamandalam Umadevi
- Stelna as Sudha
- Haritha Nair as Malavika
- Reshma R Nair as Priya
