= Aalamaram (film) =

2014 Indian film by S. N. Duraisingh

- Poster
- Directed by: S. N. Duraisingh
- Written by: S. N. Duraisingh
- Produced by: Sarvesh
- Starring: Hemanth Kumar; Avanthika Mohan
- Cinematography: K. S. Udhayashankar
- Edited by: KMK Palanivel
- Music by: Ramjeevan
- Production company: Peacock Motion Picture
- Release date: 10 October 2014
- Country: India
- Language: Tamil

Aalamaram (transl. Banyan tree) is a 2014 Indian Tamil-language romantic supernatural thriller film directed by S. N. Duraisingh and starring Hemanth Kumar and Avanthika Mohan.

== Plot ==
Aalamaram refers to a banyan tree on the border of a village in Madurai district. The locals believe that the former village head, Karuthapaandi's, ghost still persists in the tree and so everyone avoids going near that tree, which is near a temple.

Malarkodi goes to the temple to do some poojas for her marriage. Malarkodi falls in love with Karthik, a stage artiste, and they meet each other under the banyan tree.

Meanwhile, Karthik's friend Sadaiyan takes money from two local goons and gives them a false promise that Malarkodi will marry one of them. After knowing the truth that Malarkodi is in love with Karthik, the goons plan to take revenge. How Karthik and Malarkodi escape forms the rest of the story.

== Cast ==
- Hemanth Kumar as Karthik
- Avanthika Mohan as Malarkodi
- Meiyappan as Sadaiyan
- Arumugam
- Thavasi

== Production ==
The film marked the directorial debut of K. N. Duraisingh, who used to work as an assistant to K. Bhagyaraj. Malayalam actress Avantika Mohan made her Tamil debut through this film. A banyan tree was reported to play a significant role in the film. The film was shot in Madurai and Theni.

== Soundtrack ==
Ramjeevan composed five tracks for the film. Lyrics by Nandalala and Pa. Vijay.

- "Kuthu Rasikum" - Velmurugan, Anitha, Soobie
- "Aalamara Kathada"
- "Thereri Vaararu" - Vijay Prakash, Anuradha Sriram, Soobie

== Reception ==
A critic from The New Indian Express wrote that "Falling somewhere between a supernatural thriller and a romantic saga, the film is neither blood curdling, nor is it engaging in its intrigue and romance". A critic from The Hindu wrote that "Despite so many events in the film occurring right under the nose of the ghost-infested tree, it remains completely unconcerned. This is either the most indolent ghost in all of Tamil cinema or the most indifferent. You can’t but have similar sentiments about the film’s writing too". A critic from iFlicks wrote that "The director fails to capture the audience's attention. Even the love scenes are not pictured that effectively. "
