= Johny Johny Yes Appa =

- Directed by: G. Marthandan
- Written by: Joji Thomas
- Produced by: Vaishak Rajan
- Starring: Kunchacko Boban; Sanoop Santhosh; Anu Sithara; Mamta Mohandas
- Cinematography: Vinod Illampally
- Edited by: Lijo Paul
- Music by: Shaan Rahman
- Production company: Vaishaka Cynyma
- Distributed by: Vaishaka Cynyma
- Release date: 26 October 2018
- Country: India
- Language: Malayalam

Johny Johny Yes Appa (transl. Johnny Johnny Yes Papa) is a 2018 Indian Malayalam-language family comedy film directed by G. Marthandan, produced by Vaishak Rajan and written by Joji Thomas (debutant writer of Vellimoonga). It stars Kunchacko Boban and Sanoop Santhosh. The film released with a mixed reports.

== Plot ==
The story is about Johnny who pretends to be a gentleman but is a thief who thrives on lies and betrayals. When he was young, he started small by stealing a rupee from his father, Karian, a teacher, and blaming his elder brother, Peter, for childhood mischief. Karian, his mother, Gracy, and neighbors consider him a virtuous youngster. He manages to expel Peter from the family and blames his younger brother, Philip, for his misdeeds. But Philip supports and trusts Peter. Johnny is in love with Jaisa, the daughter of a wealthy businessman, Chavaramplakal Jose, who tries his best to keep them apart.

His life changes when a teenage boy, Adam alias Adithyan, enters his life while he is performing a stealth. Adam blackmails Johnny and starts living with his family. Adam reveals his back story where he was brought up in an orphanage. He falls in love with Nandana, a teenage girl who insults him since he has no address. He sets on a mission to get an address for himself and meet his mother Amala, with Johnny's help.

== Cast ==
- Kunchacko Boban as Johny Karian
- Sanoop Santhosh as Adam/Adithyan
- Anu Sithara as Jaisa, Johny's girlfriend
- Mamta Mohandas as Amala Jayakumar, Adam's mother
- Tini Tom as Peter Karian, Johny's elder brother
- Sharafudheen as Philip Karian, Johny's younger brother
- Vijayaraghavan as Karian, Johny's father
- Veena Nair as Archana, Peter's wife
- Lena as Jail Superintendent Sujatha, Nandana's mother
- Nedumudi Venu as Advocate Louis
- Geetha as Gracy Karian, Johny's mother
- Anikha as Nandana, Adam's girlfriend
- Nirmal Palazhi as Postman
- Kalabhavan Shajohn as Chavaramplakal Jose, Jaisa's father
- Bindu Aneesh as Nancy, Jaisa's mother
- Prasanth Alexander as Fr. Vincent
- Abu Salim as Seban
- Meghanadhan as Constable Chandrappan
- Rayjan Rajan as Jayakumar, Amala's husband and Adam's father
- Jaise Jose
- Nishanth Sagar as Police Officer Sathyan
- Shobha Mohan as Sister
- Anjana Appukuttan
- Anitha Dileep
- Manju Satheesh as Assistant Jail Superintendent Anupama James
- Mammootty as Voice

== Music ==
The film's music was composed by Shaan Rahman.

== Reception ==
filmibeat rated the film 3/5 and said, "A film with comedy & emotions in the right proportions". Manorama Online stated that "The film about family and for families is a typical entertainer and is a fun watch". The Times of India rated the film 2.5/5 and stated that it "not pack enough punch to offer the viewers an engaging experience".
