= Oru Kudumba Chithram =

- VCD cover
- Directed by: Ramesh Thampi
- Screenplay by: N. Ashok
- Story by: V. V. Manoj
- Produced by: R. Ramesh Kumar
- Starring: Kalabhavan Mani; Lakshmi Sharma; Ranjith; Jagathy Sreekumar; Suraj Venjaramoodu
- Cinematography: Anil Gopinath
- Edited by: Vipin Mannoor
- Music by: Anil Kumar; Indrajith Ramesh
- Production company: SRM Creation
- Distributed by: Kanakam Release
- Release date: 7 December 2012
- Country: India
- Language: Malayalam

Oru Kudumba Chithram (transl. A Family Film) is a 2012 Indian Malayalam-language film directed by Ramesh Thampi and produced by Kanakam Subair, Manu Sreekandapuram and R. Ramesh Kumar. The film stars Kalabhavan Mani, Lakshmi Sharma, Ranjith, Jagathy Sreekumar and Suraj Venjaramoodu in lead roles. The film's musical score was written by Anil Pongumoodu and Indrajith Ramesh.

== Cast ==
- Kalabhavan Mani as T. C. Arunagiri, Protagonist
- Lakshmi Sharma as Mallika, Arunagiri's wife
- Ranjith as T. C.Varunagiri
- Jagathy Sreekumar as Gajendra Kurup
- Suraj Venjaramoodu as Govardhanan, Arunagiri's Brother in law
- Kottayam Nazeer as Vakkeel
- Jaffar Idukki Japan, Tea shop owner
- Bijukuttan as Purushu
- Harishree Ashokan as Gopikuttan, Arunagiri's Friend
- Jayakrishnan as Bhargavan, Kurup's younger brother
- Manu Varma Ayyappan, Kurup's younger brother
- Manka Mahesh as Arunagiri's Mother
- Maya Moushmi as Swarnam, Arunagiri's Sister
- Sajitha Betti as Nithya, Kurup's Daughter
- Thalaivasal Vijay as Shanmukha Vel
- Valsala Menon as Paatti
- Athulya
- Lakshmi Sanal

== Soundtrack ==
The music was composed by Anil Pongumoodu and Indrajith Ramesh.

No.	Song	Singers	Lyrics	Length (m:ss)
1	"Akaluvathenthe Mukile"	Jayachandran	Pavumba Manoj	
2	"Ente Ammo Ente Ayyo"	Anwar Sadath	Ramesh Thampi	
3	"Vinnaake Ponnu Moodi"	Ajay Thilak	Subhash Cherthala	
