= Parvati Nair =

Indian actress and model (born 1987)

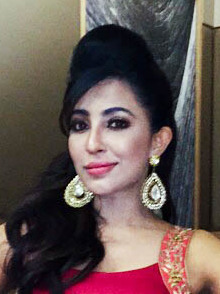
- Parvati Nair in 2024
- Born: Parvathy Venugopal Nair; 5 December 1992 (age 33); Abu Dhabi, United Arab Emirates
- Citizenship: India
- Education: Manipal Institute of Technology
- Occupations: Actress; model
- Years active: 2013–present
- Spouse: Ashrith Ashok (m. 2025)

Parvati Venugopal Nair (born 5 December 1992) is an Indian model and actress who works in the South Indian film industry. Born into a Malayali family in Abu Dhabi, she trained as a software professional from Manipal Institute of Technology. She started modelling at the age of 15 .

Nair made her acting debut with the Malayalam film Poppins as a lead in the 5 segments directed by V. K. Prakash during her Christmas vacations in December 2012, before appearing in a number of critically acclaimed films across all four South Indian film industries, including Story Kathe (2014 ) and Yennai Arindhaal (2015). Her performance as a young journalist in Story Kathe won her the Best Kannada Debut Actress Award at the South Indian International Movie Awards, while the role of a vengeful wife in Yennai Arindhaal won her praise from critics and received a Filmfare nomination. In 2015, she starred in the critical and commercial success Vascodigama, portraying an English lecturer.

== Background and family ==
Parvati was born in Abu Dhabi, United Arab Emirates into a Malayali family and has an elder brother. Her father is a businessman based in Dubai and her mother is a professor. She attended Our Own English High School in Abu Dhabi and went on to graduate in Computer Science and Engineering in from Manipal Institute of Technology in Manipal, Karnataka, India, hoping to work as a software engineer. She became a full-time model after she participated in "Miss Karnataka", won the title and went on to be an ambassador for Mysore Sandal Soap. She won "Navy Queen Kerala", before appearing in numerous print and television commercials. As a model, she has endorsed the brands Anchor, Asian Paints, Malabar Gold, Mazaa, Prestige, Reliance, ANA Airlines Japan, AbuDhabi T10 Abudhabi, Renault cars, Peps, GRT gold and diamonds, Vanish, Tata Diamonds etc. and several other national and international brands . she had also expressed interest in participating in the Femina Miss India pageant after winning the state-level title, but could not apply as a result of the competition's height eligibility. While working as a model, she began appearing in short films, music videos and documentaries. Nair married businessman Ashrith Ashok in 2025.

== Career ==
=== Early work (2012-2013) ===
After working in a jewellery commercial for director V. K. Prakash, she made her acting début in Prakash's anthology film Poppins (2012), and worked on the project alongside commitments for other Malayalam films. She played further roles as a traditional bride in the horror film Yakshi – Faithfully Yours (2012) and in Shalil Kallur's drama film. She subsequently began working on bigger budget films in the Malayalam film industry and signed on to portray Jayasurya's wife in the action anthology D Company (2013), as a part of the segment Gangs of Vadakkumnathan, which won positive reviews. Nair made her debut in the Kannada film industry through Story Kathe (2013) which earned her recognition as the Best Debut Actress in Kannada films at the 3rd South Indian International Movie Awards. Portraying a television journalist who tries to win patent rights for a medical student, her role was appreciated by critics and the film performed well at the box office. In 2013 Nair appeared as a judge in the first modelling based Malayalam reality show Super Models on Amrita Television. She also appeared in a music video, "Ariyathe Ninayathe" by Vineeth Sreenivasan and was included in Bangalore Times' "Most Desirable Women of 2013" list.

=== Breakthrough (2014-present) ===
Nair moved on to work on two big-budget Tamil films during the course of 2014 and shot for Gautham Vasudev Menon's Yennai Arindhaal (2015) and Kamal Haasan's Uttama Villain (2015). Nair was cast alongside Ajith Kumar, Trisha and Anushka Shetty in Yennai Arindhaal after a successful screen test. The actress stated it was "a dream-come-true" and to be cast in the project was "huge encouragement", and made reference to Menon's dignified portrayals of female characters. Portraying Elizabeth, the vengeful wife of Arun Vijay's character, the film and her performance received praise from Silverscreen.com, who stated she displays "awesome ruthlessness" and "nails the part". Nair also auditioned for Uttama Villain, directed by Ramesh Aravind, and portrayed the girlfriend of Kamal Haasan's son. Featuring alongside an ensemble cast, her role was extended as the shoot progressed and Nair expressed her delight at working with Kamal Haasan, stating it was like "going to an acting school". The film opened to positive reviews and marked the actress's most high-profile project at that time. She then appeared in the Kannada film, Vascodigama (2015), as a college lecturer alongside Kishore. Nair also made her debut as a singer through the film, in a song which featured Kannada and English lyrics. Indiaglitz.com noting that she "suits the role precisely" and another reviewer stating she was "utilised well" in the film.

She was also in the most desirable women of 2015, 2016, and 2017 lists from Kochi. She gave motivational talks at TEDx Bangalore and was invited to speak at a Rotary Club and various other venues.

She later appeared in Malayalam movie James and Alice (2016). Her next release was the Tamil film Koditta Idangalai Nirappuga directed by R. Parthiepan with Shanthanu Bhagyaraj as male lead in which her performance stood out and was widely appreciated. The road thriller Overtake was her next Malayalam film in which she performed stunts without a double. The movie opened to good reviews at the Kerala box office and the concept was fresh to Malayalam cinema . She paired up with Mohanlal for the movie Neerali, directed by AJoy Varma which opened to positive reviews. She later appeared in Amazon Prime's first exclusive series in Tamil named Vella Raja.

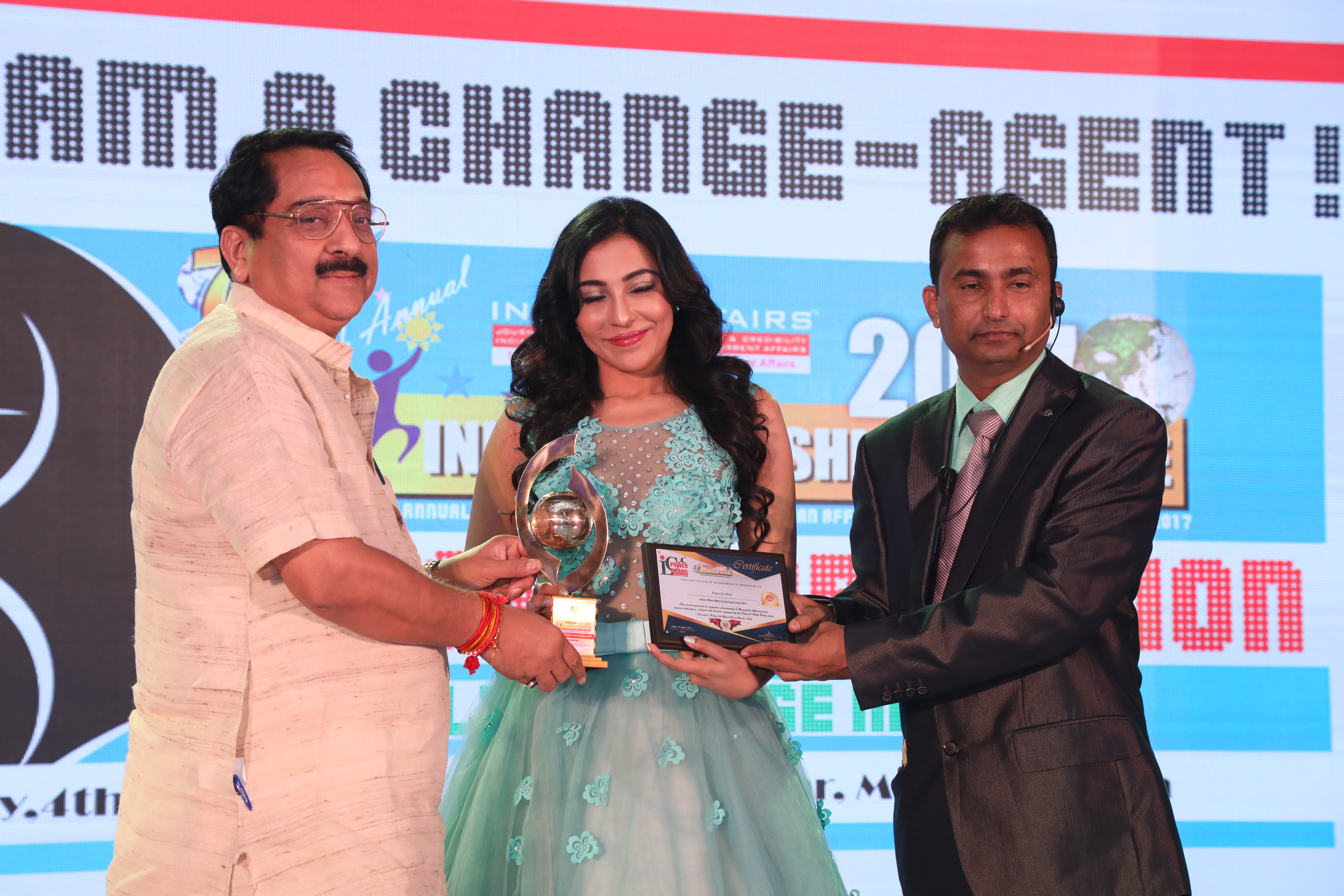
Parvati Nair receiving the Indian Affairs "Most Promising Actress 2017" award at the Satya Brahma founded 8th Annual India Leadership Conclave

Nair received the Indian Affairs "Most Promising Actress 2017" award at the 8th Annual India Leadership Conclave in Mumbai on 4 August 2017.

Parvati Nair collaborated with a US-based fashion brand Yog The Label selling her pictures featured products manufactured in USA and Europe worldwide.

In 2025, Parvati Nair’s long-delayed in the Tamil psychological thriller, Unpaarvayil, which streamed on Sun NXT.

== In the media ==
Nair has been a guest model at Indian fashion weeks, often appearing in the display of shows. At the 2013 Chennai International Fashion Week, Nair was the main model for Sakshi Bindra's clothing line and was the first day's "showstopper". She wore costumes styled by Vivek Karunakaran as a part of the Walk of Pride charity event held at the Park, Chennai in April 2015. During August 2015, she attended the India Luxury Style Week and Chennai's Fashion Culture Week within a fortnight, to promote the fashion industry in the city. In 2016, she was showstopper in the first day of the Bangalore Fashion Week, wearing traditional wear by designer Mable Thomas, and then at the Keralan Fashion League. She was a judge on Amrita TV's reality show, Supermodels, in 2013. She also appeared alongside four other actresses as the judges of the beauty pageant, Miss India Bangalore 2015 during December of that year. Her popularity as a model had initially helped her make a breakthrough into the film industry, and saw her get recognition across all four South Indian states.

Nair was announced as the brand ambassador of the Karnataka Bulldozers team during the 2016 Celebrity Cricket League and attended the team's fixtures across South India as a part of her role. She shared ambassadorial duties with actress Sharmiela Mandre, saying that she had grown up following the sport during her childhood in the United Arab Emirates, where her father and brother had played regularly. The actress also attended matches played by Royal Challengers Bangalore during the IPL Season of 2015 and played cricket as part of shooting for Uttama Villain (2015). Nair has taken part in charity events including the Clean Bengaluru Challenge in November 2014, when she helped sweep the streets of Vasanthnagar in the city. She has been chosen by Peta India as an ambassador for the adopt a stray dog campaign. She was brand ambassador for the World Junior Squash Championships held in Chennai along with Ashok Selvan.

== Filmography ==
=== Film ===
Year	Title	Role	Language	Notes	Ref.
2012	Poppins	Julie	Malayalam		
2012	Yakshi – Faithfully Yours	Meenakshi	Malayalam		
2013	Nee Ko Njaa Cha	Sania	Malayalam		
2013	Dolls	Anu	Malayalam		
2013	Story Kathe	Pallavi	Kannada	SIIMA Award for Best Female Debutant	
2013	Ninayathe	Doctor	Malayalam	Music video album	
2013	D Company	Lora	Malayalam	Segment: Gangs of Vadakumnathan	
2014	Nimirndhu Nil	Indira	Tamil	Cameo appearance	
2014	Angry Babies in Love	Paro	Malayalam		
2015	Yennai Arindhaal	Elizabeth	Tamil	Nominated- Filmfare Award for Best Supporting Actress – Tamil	
2015	Janda Pai Kapiraju	Vandhana	Telugu	Cameo appearance	
2015	Uttama Villain	Indira	Tamil		
2015	Vascodigama	Shanthi	Kannada		
2016	Maalai Naerathu Mayakkam	Kamini	Tamil	Guest Appearance	
2016	James & Alice	Nandhini	Malayalam		
2016	Koppayile Kodumkattu	Vilasini	Malayalam		
2017	Koditta Idangalai Nirappuga	Mohini	Tamil	Edison Awards (India) rising star of the year	
2017	Engitta Modhathey	Jayanthi	Tamil		
2017	Overtake	Radhika	Malayalam		
2018	Nimir	Shenbaghavalli (Valli)	Tamil		
2018	Neerali	Naina	Malayalam		
2018	Seethakaathi	Herself	Tamil		
2021	83	Pammie Gavaskar	Hindi		
2023	Dhoomam	Model	Malayalam	Guest appearance	
2024	Super Zindagi	Vidya	Malayalam		
2024	The Greatest of All Time	Junior SATS officer	Tamil		
2025	Mr. Rani	Deepika	Kannada		
2025	Unpaarvaiyil	Bhavya / Divya	Tamil	Dual role	
TBA	Aalambana †	TBA	Tamil	Filming	

=== Television ===
Year	Title	Role	Language	Platform	Ref.
2018	Vella Raja	Tresa	Tamil	Amazon Prime Video	

== Awards and nominations ==
Year	Award	Category	Film	Result	Ref.
2013	3rd South Indian International Movie Awards	Best Female Debutant – Kannada	Story Kathe	Won	
2015	Filmfare Awards South	Best Supporting Actress – Tamil	Yennai Arindhaal	Nominated	
2016	Ramu Kariat Award	Excellence in other languages	Yennai Arindhal	Won	
2017	Tea Advertisement Award	Best Model	TVC	Won	
2017	India Leadership Conclave	Most Promising Actress	Films	Won	
2018	Abdul Kalam Award	Women's Excellence	Society Contributions	Won	
2018	MFS Nalli Film Awards	Best Heroine	Koditta Idangalai Nirappuga	Won	
2018	Edison Awards (India)	Rising Star of the Year	Nimir	Won	
