= Achante Aanmakkal =

- Directed by: Chandrasekharan
- Written by: Satheesh Mannur
- Screenplay by: N. M. Nawaz
- Story by: Satheesh Mannur
- Produced by: Prabhakaran; Natarajan
- Starring: Sarath Kumar; Nedumudi Venu; Jagadish; Meghna Raj
- Cinematography: Dileep Raman
- Music by: Jassie Gift
- Production company: Rajaprabha Creations
- Distributed by: Hollywood Films
- Release date: 2 March 2012
- Country: India
- Language: Malayalam

Achante Aanmakkal (transl. Sons of father) is a 2012 Malayalam-language film directed by Chandrasekharan, starring Sarath Kumar, Jagadish, Nedumudi Venu, Meghna Raj and Lakshmi Sharma. The film was a box-office failure. The film was later dubbed in Tamil as Narasimhan IPS.

== Plot ==
Madhava Menon is a respected retired police officer and has two daughters, Meera and Meena. Narasimhan, an efficient police commissioner in Tamil Nadu, marries Meera and Nandagopan, an inspector in the Kerala Police who does homework more efficiently than his official work, marries Meena. They all live very happily. A twist happens in Madhava Menon's life when the state legislative election is announced. The leader of a political party digs out an old case (the death of a teenage boy in police custody) in order to trap another leader in the opposition party. The case begins to draw big attention, and the press comes to Madhava Menon's house to ask him about the case because he was in charge of the police station when the boy died. He tells the media that he killed the boy. It was a surprise to his daughters and sons-in-law. Soon he is arrested and put into jail. Narasimhan and Nandagopan join hands and search for the truth as they are sure their father-in-law did not do such a thing. Also, they doubt that he agreed to have committed the crime to save someone else. Through a series of investigations, Narasimhan and Nandagopan find the original culprit and prove Madhava Menon's innocence.

== Cast ==
- Sarath Kumar as Commissioner Narasimhan IPS, Coimbatore
- Nedumudi Venu as DYSP Madhava Menon
- Jagadish as CI Nandakumar
- Meghna Raj as Meera, Narasiman's wife and Madhava Menon's elder daughter
- Lakshmi Sharma as Meena, Nandakumar's wife and Madhava Menon's younger daughter
- Shivaji Guruvayoor as Vishwambaran
- Vijayaraghavan as Koyikkal Keshavadas
- Baiju as Koyikkal Mohandas
- Anil Murali as Koyikkal Krishnadas
- Kottayam Nazeer as Sukumaran
- Sadik as Narayanan
