= Drona 2010 =

2010 action horror film by Shaji Kailas

- Theatrical release poster
- Directed by: Shaji Kailas
- Written by: A. K. Sajan
- Produced by: M. Mani
- Starring: Mammootty
- Cinematography: N. K. Ekambaram
- Edited by: Don Max
- Music by: Deepak Dev (songs); Rajamani (score)
- Production company: Aroma Movies
- Release date: 27 January 2010
- Running time: 152 minutes
- Country: India
- Language: Malayalam

Drona 2010 is a 2010 Indian Malayalam-language psychological horror film directed by Shaji Kailas. Mammootty appears in dual role supported by Manoj K. Jayan, Suraj Venjaramoodu, Kaniha, Navya Nair, Thilakan, Jayan Cherthala, Biju Pappan, Lakshmi Sharma and K. P. A. C. Lalitha. Roles of Mammootty's assistants are played by Bala, Vijayakumar and Irshad. Scripted by A. K. Sajan. The film was released on 27 January 2010.

== Plot ==
Kunjunni, an atheist from the US, in an inebriated condition arrives on a rainy night to purchase Nelloor Mana, which is believed to be haunted by the ghost of Savithri. Being crazy about old houses and palaces, Kunjunni, who is into real estate business was lured into this deal by Gireeshan, the son of Gupthan Namboothiri, a feudal landlord. In a fight with Kunjunni, his younger son had fallen from the terrace and had got paralyzed below the hips. Now Guptan Namboothiri wants to avenge for it.

Upon reaching the old house, Kunjunni is attacked by the goons of Gireeshan, but he escapes miraculously. An atheist, Kunjunni leads a carefree life away from the traditions of his family and is in love with Thulasimani, the adopted daughter of Pisharody, the old friend of his late father, who was also a famous tantrik. In spite of all the blocks that comes his way, Kunjunni reaches back to own the house. Gireeshan leads him inside and he feels the presence of some supernatural powers inside. While stepping into the pond, he feels trapped inside and as if someone was pulling him down. The dead body of Kunjunni was found at the nearby river on next day.

Pattazhi Madhavan Nambooothiri, his elder twin brother, who is also a strong tantrik and Sanskrit professor decides to probe the reasons that caused his brother's death. Madhavan suspects Gireeshan's role in it. Madhavan is married to Mithra, the daughter of Gupthan Namboothiri who married Madhavan against his wishes. It is revealed that Kunjunni was the one who helped Madhavan and Mithra get married despite the enmity between the two families. Upon learning about his brother's death, Madhavan goes to Nelloor Mana and along with his three disciples starts residing there. It is also revealed that Madhavan's father also had died by drowning in the pond long back while he was there to perform a vasthu puja. Madhavan and his disciples come across several supernatural experiences inside the house. Madhavan finds several vastu doshas existing in the house that had caused a series of accidents including fire tragedies that had killed several members long back. Madhavan brings in the youngest member of Uliyanoor Thachan to rectify the errors. Along with that, he also does several pujas to clear up the mess. However, things get more complicated with the arrival of Thulasimani. She is haunted by an unseen force from time to time. It is revealed that Thulasi is none other than the daughter of Harinarayanan Namboothiri, who was killed in a fire accident years ago. Automatically, the ownership of the house comes into the hands of Thulasi. One night, one of the disciples of Madhavan is killed. The same night, Madhavan is attacked by Jayan, the elder son of Gupthan Namboothiri and also by Choondakkaran Vasu, but he successfully defeats them and pushes them into the pond, where they drown to death. Gireeshan pushes Madhavan to the pond and tries to kill him. But the next day, Jayan's corpse is found in the river but Madhavan comes to the river alive. Beeran Sahib, the DIG of police arrives at the spot for investigation and is shocked to find another corpse, that is of Vishahari, a trusted left hand of Jayan in the house.

Madhavan explains Beeran the secrets of the supernatural things happening inside. A secret passage exists from the pond to the river that carries anyone who steps into the pond to the river. He also explains, that it was not any supernatural element that had killed his disciple, but was Jayan and Vishahari, who were in the house to hunt down Madhavan. The next night, Madhavan is getting prepared for the final puja to clear up the whole mess, when Gireeshan arrives in the garbs of Savitri. It is revealed that Gireeshan is suffering from multiple personality disorder and it is him, whom many people mistook to the ghost of Savitri. Gireeshan reveals that he killed Kunjunni. Madhavan physically overpowers Gireeshan and defeats him, thereby putting an end to the mystery of the ghost. He thus moves back from Nelloor Mana, handing the key to Thulasimani.

== Cast ==
- Mammootty in a dual role as:
  - Pattazhi Madhavan Namboothiri
  - Pattazhi Kunjunni
- Manoj K. Jayan as Maniyankottu Gireeshan, the main antagonist
- Thilakan as Maniyankottu Guptan Namboothiri, Gireeshan's and Jayan's father
- Kaniha as Thulasimani
- Navya Nair as Maniyankottu Mithra Andarjanam, Madhavan's wife
- Dhanya Mary Varghese as Maniyankottu Savithri
- Suraj Venjaramoodu as Uliyannoor Raghu Uthaman
- Bala as Anandapadmanabhan, Madhavan's associate
- Irshad as Aadishankaran, Madhavan's associate
- Vijayakumar as Aadikeshavan, Madhavan's associate
- Lakshmi Sharma as Maniyankottu Gauri, Gireeshan's and Jayan's sister
- K. P. A. C. Lalitha as Aathiyamma, Madhavan's and Kunjunni's mother
- Jayan Cherthala as Maniyankottu Jayan, Gireeshan's elder brother and the secondary antagonist
- T. P. Madhavan as Pisharody, Thulasi's foster father
- Devan as DIG Beeran Sahib IPS
- Ranjini Jose as Jyolsna
- Kollam Thulasi as Vishahaari/Chaamiyar
- Narayanankutty as Kizhakkedam
- Kunchan as Ashokan, Maniyankottu member
- Biju Pappan as Choondakkaran Vasu, a local fisherman, Gireeshan's and Jayan's henchmen
- Abu Salim as Velayudhan
- Kiran Raj as Rajeevan
- Subair as Driver Kunjambu
- Sadiq as CI Abdullah
- V. K. Sreeraman as Pattazhi Sankaran Namboothiripad, Madhavan and Kunjunni's father
- Nandu as Nelloor Harinarayanan Namboothiri, Thulasi's father
- Balachandran Chullikkadu as Nelloor Karanavar
- Unni Sisupal as Maniyankottu Soori, Gireeshan's and Jayan's younger brother
- V.K Baiju
- Kulappulli Leela as Jameela

== Soundtrack ==
Music is composed by Deepak Dev and lyrics by Kaithapram Damodaran Namboothiri.

- Anchikonchathadi - Vinutha, Sangeetha, Nandu
- Drona Theme - Nithin Raj

== Reception ==
Critic from Sify wrote: "start rolling the viewer wonders what the makers of this film trying to tell amidst all the ruckus and mayhem on screen for more than two and a half painful hours. If you are a fan of Mammootty, watch some of his brilliant movies from the past or even the recent Paleri Manikyam to have a feel of his genius. Sadly, this one is nowhere in that league" K C Asok from Deccan Herald Wrote that "The nearly three-hour saga is a virtual shindig. Actors suffer due to poor dubbing and the perplexing plot make the cast and situations appear contrived." Paresh C. Palicha from Rediff.com wrote "All in all, the actors deserve a better film than this ho-hum film." Dhrona old fashioned story the film revolves around a mysterious old mansion believed to be haunted by a ghost.
