= Aaravadhu Vanam =

- Directed by: R. Bhuvanesh
- Written by: R. Bhuvanesh
- Produced by: S. M. Thiyagarajan
- Starring: Bhushan; Vidhya Mohan; Bose Venkat
- Cinematography: S. Taj
- Edited by: Xian
- Music by: R. Haribabu
- Production company: MPG Films International
- Release date: 9 July 2010
- Running time: 155 minutes
- Country: India
- Language: Tamil

Aaravadhu Vanam (transl. Sixth forest) is a 2010 Indian Tamil language romantic drama film written and directed by R. Bhuvanesh. The film stars Bhushan, Vidhya Mohan and Bose Venkat, with Ramya, Ansiba Hassan, Scissor Manohar, Mahalingam Pollachi, Porur Sekar and Thangam playing supporting roles. The film, produced by S. M. Thiyagarajan, had musical score by R. Haribabu and was released on 9 July 2010. The film was remade in Malayalam as Bhagavathipuram (2011).

== Plot ==
A few months ago in a remote village called Aaravadhu Vanam, the villagers strongly condemned inter-caste marriages and strictly followed the caste system. The village bigwig Dharma (Bose Venkat) wanted to marry his college-going relative Malar (Vidhya Mohan). The ruffian Puli (Bhushan), who had no family, committed crimes while wearing a lion mask. Malar became curious about Puli. She then fell in love with him and even kissed him one day. One week before her marriage to Dharma, Malar declared her love for Puli, who scolded her for being senseless to fall in love with a wastrel with no future. On the day of the marriage, she left the wedding hall to meet Puli, but he brought her back. Malar's father and his henchmen insulted Puli. Consumed with anger, Puli changed his mind and swore to marry her. The two run away from the henchmen, and when they arrive in Chennai, Puli is hit by a car. Malar admits him to a hospital in Chennai, and Dharma comes to support her. Puli is diagnosed with mental illness, and Malar takes care of him at the hospital, but a year later, he vanishes.

In the present, Dharma is still in love with Malar and wants to marry her at all costs. Dharma was the one who put Puli in a random container lorry, and he even corrupted a police officer to declare him dead. Malar finally agrees to marry Dharma. In the meantime, Puli returns to his village and has a brutal fight with Dharma and his henchmen. Dharma eventually kills Puli and marries Malar the next day. Just after the marriage, Malar reveals to Dharma that she knows he has killed her lover, and she suddenly dies. Dharma then discovers that all the villagers except him are dead, and he finds that their marriage food was poisoned.

The mental trauma turns Dharma insane, and he lives alone in the empty village. The film ends with Dharma dying.

== Cast ==
- Bhushan as Puli
- Vidhya Mohan as Malar
- Bose Venkat as Dharma
- Ramya
- Ansiba Hassan as Anu
- Scissor Manohar as Krish
- Mahalingam Pollachi as Mahalingam
- Porur Sekar
- Thangam as Thangam
- Madurai Mohan
- Chinrasu
- Rajini Mani

== Production ==
R. Bhuvanesh, an erstwhile assistant of directors K. Bhagyaraj and R. Parthiepan, made his directorial debut with Aaravadhu Vanam under the banner of MPG Films International. Kannada actor Bhushan, Vidhya Mohan from Kerala and Bose Venkat were selected to play the lead roles. The story is derived from the Mahabharata in which the sixth forest (Aaravadhu Vanam) was supposed to be the toughest for the Pandavas to go through and the battle was the bloodiest in the whole war when going through this passage. Aaravadhu Vanam is based on a real-life incident about the entire village community vacating their lands for the sake of a young couple in love. Director R. Bhuvanesh wanted to film Aaravadhu Vanam in the same village, but the couple didn't allow them to do so. Without any options left, the crew journeyed across various places and finally nailed down Singaram Palayam located near Coimbatore district. But again, the villagers were infuriated on the plea of filmmaker to vacate their lands for five whole days. As they were explained about the contextual scenario and script, the villagers changed their minds and heeded to their petitions. R. Haribabu, a former assistant to Srikanth Deva, had scored the music.

== Soundtrack ==
Aaravadhu Vanam

Soundtrack album by R. Haribabu
- Released: 2009
- Recorded: 2009
- Genre: Feature film soundtrack
- Length: 29:27
- Producer: R. Haribabu

The soundtrack was composed by R. Haribabu. The soundtrack, released in 2009, features 6 tracks.

Tracklist
No.	Title	Lyrics	Singer(s)	Length
1.	"Vinmeena Pidichivandhu"	R. Bhuvanesh	Roshini	4:21
2.	"Kannale Kannale"	Muthu Vijayan	Bellie Raj	4:47
3.	"Enn Uyire"	M. Pugazhendhi	Prasanna, Deepa Miriam	5:23
4.	"Yarodu Yaaridam"	R. Bhuvanesh	Mukesh Mohamed	6:08
5.	"Mayiley Oh Mayile"	R. Bhuvanesh	Srimathumitha	4:48
6.	"Aanda Gunda"	R. Bhuvanesh	Velmurugan, Charulatha Mani	4:00
Total length:				29:27
