= Shalu Menon =

Indian actress

- Born: Shalu Menon; Changanassery, Kottayam, Kerala, India
- Other name: Shalu
- Occupations: Actress; Dancer
- Spouse: Saji G. Nair (m. 2016)
- Parents: Venugopal; Kaladevi

Shalu Menon is an Indian television and film actress. She is also a classical dancer.

== Filmography ==
| Year | Film | Role | Co-Stars | Notes |
|---|---|---|---|---|
| 1998 | British Market | Leena's Friend | Vijayaraghavan, Anju Aravind | |
| 2000 | Cover Story | Journalist | Suresh Gopi, Tabu | |
| 2001 | Kakkakuyil | Shalini | Mohanlal, Mukesh | |
| 2001 | Vakkalathu Narayanankutty | Nivedita | Jayaram, Manya | |
| 2001 | Ennum Sambhavami Yuge Yuge | Sona | Sri | |
| 2002 | Aaradyam Parayum | | | |
| 2002 | Grandmother | | | |
| 2003 | Parinamam | Ramani | Nedumudi Venu, Kaviyoor Ponnamma | |
| 2003 | Kalari Vikraman | | | |
| 2004 | Oru Christmas Rathri | Sali | Irshad | |
| 2004 | Bethlehemile Pookkal | Panchami | Venu Nagavally | |
| 2005 | Makalkku | Bindu | Shobhana, Suresh Gopi | |
| 2006 | Kissan | Kalyani | Kalabhavan Mani, Biju Menon | |
| 2007 | Indrajith | Suma | Kalabhavan Mani | |
| 2012 | Thirike Veendum | | | |
| 2013 | Ithu Pathiramanal | Ambika | Unni Mukundan, Jayasurya | |

== TV serials ==
List of Shalu Menon television serials credits
| Year | Serial | Channel | Role |
|---|---|---|---|
| 2000 | Patharamaatu | Asianet | |
| 2001 | Ninakkayi | Kairali TV | |
| 2001 | Alakal | DD Malayalam | Chippy |
| 2001–2003 | Sthreejanmam | Surya TV | Sariga |
| 2001 | Swayamvaram | Surya TV | |
| 2002 | Saradha | Asianet | |
| 2003 | Swantham | Asianet | |
| 2004 | Mangalyam | Asianet | Sumithra |
| 2004 | Omanathinkalpakshi | Asianet | |
| 2004 | Kadamattath Kathanar | Asianet | Kochuthresia |
| 2004 | Aalippazham | Surya TV | |
| 2004 | Chitta | Surya TV | |
| 2004 | Kayamkulam Kochunni | Surya TV | Semantha |
| 2005 | Mukesh Kathakal | Kairali TV | |
| 2005 | Kudumbini | Asianet | |
| 2005 | Krishnakripasagaram | Amrita TV | Parvati Devi |
| 2006 | Kadalinakkare | Asianet | |
| 2006 | Swanamayooram | Asianet | Vishnupriya |
| 2006 | Lakshyam | Asianet | |
| 2006 | Suryodayam | | |
| 2007 | Velankani Mathavu | Surya TV | |
| 2006–2007 | Swami Ayyappan | Asianet | Parvati Devi |
| 2006 | Manassariayathe | Surya TV | |
| 2008 | Aparichitha | DD Malayalam | |
| 2008 | Sree Mahabhagavatham | Asianet | |
| 2008 | Alilathali | Asianet | |
| 2008 | Gajarajan Guruvayoor Keshavan | Surya TV | Subhadra |
| 2008–2011 | Devimahathmyam | Asianet | Parvathi Devi |
| 2009 | Chandrettanum Shobedathiyum | Asianet | |
| 2009 | Sagaram | DD Malayalam | Urmila |
| 2009 | Vadakaikkoru Hirdayam | Amrita TV | Ashwathy |
| 2009–2010 | Akkare Ikkare | Asianet | |
| 2010 | Indhraneelam | Surya TV | Circle Inspector Latha |
| 2010 | Veera Marthanda Varma | Surya TV | |
| 2010 | Lipstick | Asianet | Shailaja |
| 2011 | Amman | Vasantham TV | Tamil Serial; Devi |
| 2010–2011 | Alaudinte Albhuthavilakku | Asianet | |
| 2011–2012 | Sreekrishnan | Surya TV | |
| 2012 | Snehakkoodu | Surya TV | |
| 2012 | Sreepadmanabham | Amrita TV | |
| 2013 | Mayamadhavam | Surya TV | |
| 2013 | Penmanassu | Surya TV | |
| 2013 | Kanamarayathu | Kairali TV | |
| 2015 | Vazhve Maayam | Doordarshan | |
| 2016 | Sathyam Sivam Sundaram | Amrita TV | Bhairavi |
| 2017–2019 | Karuthamuthu | Asianet | Kanya Jayan |
| 2019–2024 | Manjil Virinja Poovu | Mazhavil Manorama | Prathiba |
| 2020–2022 | Thinkal Kalaman | Surya TV | Anupama |
| 2020 | Swantham Sujatha | Surya TV | as Herself in promo |
| 2021 | Priyankari | Flowers | |
| 2022–2023 | Mrs. Hitler | Zee Keralam | Hiranamyi |
| 2023 | Sita Ramam | Surya TV | Vasundhara |
| 2023–2024 | Ninnishtam Ennishtam | Surya TV | Durga |
| 2024–2025 | Valsalyam | Zee Keralam | Indraja |
| 2024–2025 | Meenu's Kitchen | Mazhavil Manorama | Suhasini |
| 2026–Present | Peythozhiyathe | Surya TV | Hema |

== Albums ==
| Year | Film | Role | Co-Stars | Notes |
|---|---|---|---|---|
| 2012 | Oru Naal | | Sajan Surya | Musical album |
| | Ee Kurumbanaloru Kurumbana | | Kalabhavan Mani | Musical album |
| 2012 | Nammo Nammah Sree | | Sangeetha Mohan | Devotional album |
| 2014 | Chilamboli | | | Devotional album |
| 2014 | Devi Kungumaam | | | Devotional album |
| 2014 | Sree Durga | | | Devotional album |
| 2014 | Devi Chandanam | | | Devotional album |
| 2019 | Moovanthipottu | | | Devotional album |

== Personal life ==
Shalu married her longtime boyfriend Saji G Nair on 8 September 2016.
