= Kerala Police (film) =

- Directed by: Chandrasekharan
- Starring: Kalabhavan Mani; Lakshmi Sharma
- Music by: Kailas Menon
- Release date: 25 March 2008
- Country: India
- Language: Malayalam

Kerala Police is a 2008 Indian Malayalam-language film directed by Chandrasekharan. The film stars Kalabhavan Mani and Lakshmi Sharma in the lead roles.

== Cast ==
- Kalabhavan Mani as CI Satyanathan
- Swarnamalya as Nandini Varma, CBI officer
- Lakshmi Sharma as Sanjana
- Innocent as SP Philip Tharakan IPS
- Suraj Venjaramoodu as Hari, Film Producer
- Vijay Menon as Film Director
- Bijukuttan as Gowthaman Balram
- Madhu Warrier as Kiran
- K. P. A. C. Lalitha
- Bindu Panicker as Sathyanathan's mother
- Baiju as Mukundan Varma
- Jaggannathan as Frame News Janardanan
- Maya Vishwanath as Lalitha Bhai, Kiran's associate
- Arun Gosh as Vimal Roy

== Reception ==
A critic from Sify gave the film a negative review and wrote that "On the whole Kerala Police is another Mani mass masala movie with scenes you have seen before and a weak climax, that leaves you with a migrane".
