= Bhadra (2019 TV series) =

Indian Malayalam TV series

- Genre: Soap opera
- Created by: Baiju Devaraj
- Developed by: V. Tracks Info Media Pvt Ltd
- Written by: John John; Leena P. Nair
- Screenplay by: John John
- Story by: John John
- Directed by: Baiju Devaraj; Venu Chelakkottu
- Starring: #Cast
- Voices of: Manoj Nair; Devi S.
- Theme music composer: Jithin K. Roshan
- Composer: Raajeev Alungal
- Country of origin: India
- Original language: Malayalam
- No. of seasons: 1
- No. of episodes: 139

Production
- Executive producer: Sajayan Perigamala
- Production location: Thiruvananthapuram
- Cinematography: Anpumani; Laiju Aravind; Ani V.Tracks; Ajesh; Anoop
- Animators: Santhosh Sreeshar; Manju Simon (title)
- Camera setup: Multi-Camera
- Running time: 16–29 minutes
- Production company: V. Tracks Info Media Pvt Ltd

Original release
- Network: Surya TV
- Release: 16 September 2019 – 27 March 2020

Bhadra is an Indian Malayalam-language television series directed by Baiju Devaraj and Venu Chalakottu. It premiered on Surya TV on 16 September 2019 and streams on Sun NXT. The show abruptly went off air on 27 March 2020 due to the COVID-19 pandemic.

== Plot ==
Bhadra is the gem of lady, an epitome of all good qualities. Bhadra lush life enters into undesirable woes when circumstances lead her to be accused of her husband, Madhavan's murder.

== Cast ==
- Seena Antony as Bhadra
- Vijay Anand as Madhavan
- Sarath Das as Hari
- Sreelakshmi as Seethalakshmi
- Krishnachandran
- Ramesh Kottayam
- Mahesh as Swami
- Swathi Shaji as Bhama
- Thanvi
- Vidhya Pillai
- Anandhu Sheeja
- Kezia Joseph
- Vipian James
