= Valli (TV series) =

- Genre: Soap opera Romance (love)
- Written by: Dialogues by V.Srinivasan; Manohar; Joegeorge; M.P. Karthikayan; Balathangam; Selvam; Vasu Bharathi; V. Padmavathy
- Screenplay by: Raj Prabhu; K. Shanmugam; S. Sekkilar; V. Padmavathy
- Directed by: R.P Maradhu (Episodes 1-50); K. Shanmugam (Episodes 51-70); R. Nandhakumar (Episodes 71-233); Hafees (Episode 234-244); N. Sundareshwaran (Episodes 245-1147); Sai Marudhu (Episode 1148-1458); K.J.Thangapandian (Episodes 1459-1881); S. Anand Babu (Episodes 1882-1961)
- Creative directors: B. R. Vijayalakshmi; Prince Immanuels
- Starring: Vidhya Mohan; Sachin; Rani; Raj Kumar.
- Theme music composer: X. Paulraj
- Opening theme: "Kaalam Oru Nathiyena"
- Country of origin: India
- Original language: Tamil
- No. of episodes: 1961

Production
- Cinematography: K.S.Udhaya Shankar; M.V.Kalyan
- Editors: Muralikrishnan; T.A. Gopinath; Co.Parandhaman; Vinod
- Camera setup: Multi-camera
- Running time: 22 minutes
- Production company: Saregama

Original release
- Network: Sun TV
- Release: 17 December 2012 – 14 September 2019

Valli is a 2012-2019 Indian Tamil-language soap opera that premiered on Sun TV on 17 December 2012 and ended on 14 September 2019 for 1,961 episodes. The show starred Vidhya Mohan and Rani. The show is produced by Saregama and directed by N.Sundhareshwaran

== Plot ==
Valli portrays the courage shown by a small-town girl who is very simple and ordinary in looks. She runs away from her hometown due to the troubles caused by her maternal uncle as he tries to get Valli married to a local guy for money. Valli starts a fascinating journey seeking fresh hopes in life and an environment to suit herself. She hides her own identity in the new environment and tries settling into a new life without any burdens and sorrows. During this period, there comes a new problem which she had never imaged about.

Over time, enmity develops between Valli and a female rowdy named Indrasena. Indrasena is waiting for Valli to take revenge at the right time. Meanwhile, a lawyer named Nandan falls in love with Valli. Valli also accepts Nandan's desire for marriage. Both are engaged to be married. All have expressed interest in this marriage except Nandan's mother Banumati. Banumati seeks Indrasena's help to prevent the marriage. Subramani's wife Madhumita maintains a fake friendship with Indrasena to help Valli find out about this.

Vikram, also known as Vicky, is introduced there as an employee in the wedding hall. Indrasena tries to confuse Valli's marriage with Vicky. Just as Nandan is getting ready to tie the thaali to Valli at the right moment, Vicky unexpectedly snatches the thaali from Nandan's hand and forcibly ties the thaali around Valli's neck. Valli is upset that she is married to someone she does not know. After that, it is revealed that Vicky is a rich family guy who has the temperament to bet on money and do whatever it takes to win, and thus forcibly tied Thaali around Valli's neck in order to win the bet with Indrasena. Indrasena also comes there and challenges Valli saying that she has given a huge life sentence.

Everyone there, including Nandan, tells Valli about the idea of removing the thaali that was tied against her will and remarrying. However, Valli says that she will never take off the thaali tied around her neck and that she will accept Vicky as her husband and live happily with him, overcoming Indrasena's challenge. Valli accepts Vicky's thaali around her neck and moves to her husband Vicky's house to live with him as his wife. After Valli changes Vicky's mind a little and makes him a responsible man, she starts a husband - wife relationship with him and becomes his wife completely.

She faces many more challenges from the people where she is currently and her life becomes more miserable than ever when she was in her small town. The story then takes a high twist and turn and runs into a peachy mood and how Valli shows her courage to manage all those problems and come out of the situation forms the crux of the story. Valli dons her twin sister Vennila's identity to solve the problems in her life with the help of an old lady named Rajeswari. Vennila's husband Anand didn't go to school at his young days due to his uncle Sivashankaran's evil plans. Shankar also kills Anand's parents and makes Anand as a foolish and scared of his brother Prakash. Valli helps Anand in his learning with the help of her friend Nandan. Vennila is pregnant and the story moves in that line. Shankar's daughter Shalini marries Arun, with an unknown fact that he has a mother and a younger sister. Her uncle Nithish, who loves her makes a plan to separate Shalini and Arun. All these plans go vain due to the idea of Arun's sister in law Anandhi and his father Natarajan.

Shankar and Prakash make accident to Anand with the help of Bala. Due to this accident, Anand reaches Coma stage. Sena gets a new enemy named Inspector Karthikeyan. Karthikeyan and Sena become friends because Sena is helping him to find his kidnapped daughter Vandhana. Sena identifies that Vandhana was kidnapped by Balaji, who wants to avenge his sister who had been raped by Arya, famous businessman Kasinathan's son. Sena rescues her and in the meantime, Bala and Sorna ally again to revenge Valli and Vicky. Anand gets cured of Coma stage and takes charge as MD of Anand Group of Companies. Vennila delivers a baby and gets eyesight. Valli-Vicky goes to Yercaud for honeymoon. But the spirit of Umamaheshwari enters Valli, even though Uma is in coma stage. Now Prakash gets all properties of Anand by kidnapping Vennila's son with the help of his father in law GRK. Prakash marries Devi. Vaishali and GRK find out about Prakash's second marriage. Devi becomes MD of Anand Group of Companies. Prakash becomes her assistant. Indrasena also faces numerous problems through Chamundeshwari, her husband Ashok, Ashok's father Singaperumal and later on through Singaperumal's sister Deivanayaki. Indrasena helps to Judge Sivagami because her granddaughter was murdered by Singaperumal. Anand finds out the truth about Valli. Prakash turns good and plots with Valli and Vicky against Sivashankar. But Sivashankar continues to brainwash Anand. Valli gets pregnant.

Sivashankar implants a bomb in the car in an attempt to kill Vennila. However, Venilla survives and disguises as a male cook by name Singaravelan and joins in Anand's house so that she can expose the true nature of Sivashankar to Anand. Valli's friend Rahul donates his kidney to Azhagamperumal because of kidney failure. But Rahul blackmails Valli and Vicky, he states that the price is Valli's first child. Sivashankar is trying Anand get to marry with a girl Archana although Anand had married. Deivanayaki tries to shoot and kill Indrasena but Sivagami's housemaid Kamala saves Indrasena and Kamala gets shot and dies.then judge sivagami accuses the criminals. Then the life shifts to Valli were the baby of the Valli was adopted to Valli's friend Rahul with the presence of their family. After the critical situation, Rahul gives the baby to Valli and leave their life. Anand appoints an assistant named Archana

== Cast ==
=== Main ===
- Uma (1-234) as Valli → Vidhya Vinu Mohan (235-1961) as Valli Vicky and Vennila Anand
- Rani as Indhrasena a.k.a. Sena, famous don, Valli's friend

=== Recurring ===
- Rajkumar Manoharan as Vikram Azhagamperumal a.k.a. Vicky, Azhagamperumal's son, Valli's husband
- Ajai Kapoor as Anand Chandrasekharan aka Anand, Chandrasekharan's son, Vennila's husband, Prakash's cousin brother.
- Jyothi Lakshmi → Latha Sathupathy as Rajeshwari, Anand and Prakash's grandmother, Chandrasekharan and Sivashankaran's mother
- Lakshmi Raj as Prakash, Shivashankaran's son, Anand's cousin brother
- Poovilangu Mohan as Azhagamperumal, Vicky and Geetha's father
- Kanya Bharathi → Uma Rani as Mythili Azhagamperumal, Azhagamperumal's second wife and Vicky and Geetha's stepmother
- S.Kavitha as Geetha Balasundaram, Vicky's sister, Bala's second wife
- Rajasekhar → Girish as Sivashankaran, Rajeshwari's second son
- Dr. Sharmila as Gayathri Sivashankaran, Sivashankaran's wife
- Sasi Anand as Kottaiswamy, Valli's uncle
- Subramanian Gopalakrishnan as Karthick, Valli's friend
- Dindukal Dhanam → Surekha as Bhagyam, Valli's mother
- Anuradha Krishnamoorthy as Judge Sivagami
- Dharshini as Poongudi, Valli's mother
- Jeeva Ravi as Chandrasekharan, Rajeshwari's first son, Anand's father (Dead)
- Niharika as Pavithra, Anand's mother (Dead)
- Vietnam Veedu Sundaram as Sundaram, Indrasena's uncle (Dead)

=== Other Cast ===
- Manoharan Krishnan as Balasundaram, Geetha's and Nagalakshmi's husband, Mythili's brother
- Ujjayinee Roy as Chamundeshwari Ashok, Ashok's wife
- Saif as Dileep, Thara's husband
- Pooja → Preethi Kumar as Thara Dileep, Indrasena's niece
- Bharathi Mohan as Singaperumal, Ashok's father
- Nagalakshmi as Nagalakshmi Bala (Bala's first wife)
- Nagu Pinky as Deivanayaki, Singaperumal's sister
- Sreenidhi Sudharsan as Nandhini / Lakshmi
- V. Dasharathy as Josheyar
- Mahalakshmi as Archana, Shivashankaran's assistant
- Baby George as Karpagam, Archana's mother
- VJ Mounika as Vaishali Prakash, Prakash wife, Valli's friend
- S. Sunil Kumar as G.R.K, Vaishali's father
- Nathan Shyam as Rahul, Valli's friend
- Sangeetha Gayathri as Ramya Rahul, Rahul's wife
- Mohana as TV host
- Ramji as Subramaniam Natraj (Subbu)
- Indraja as Madhumitha Subramaniam, Subramani's wife
- V.S. Raghavan as Swaminathan, Subramani's grandfather
- Samdani Basha as Mahesh
- Sivan Sreenivasan as Natraj Swaminathan, Subramani's father
- Priya as Lakshmi Natraj, Subramani's mother
- Bhavani as Santha, Madhumitha's mother
- Prakash Rajan as Subash
- Pandu as Natarajan, Arun's father
- Sri Vidhya Shankar as Renukadevi, Arun's mother
- Adams as Arun, Shalini's husband
- Tejaswini Shekar → Darshana Das as Shalini Arun, Sivashankaran's daughter
- Aravind as Aravind, Arun's brother
- Sonia as Anandhi, Aravind's wife
- Suchithra as Suchithra, Arun's sister
- Gopi as Nithish, Shalini's mother
- K. S. Jayalakshmi as Shanthi
- Monika as Vishnu Vandhana
- Guhan Shanmugam as Balaji
- Manikandan as Arya
- Balasubramani as Inspector Karthikeyan
- Sangeetha Balan as Sorna, female don
- Kasi as Kasinathan
- Sudha Prakash as Lakshmi
- Bobby Bilani as Aditya, Kasinathan's son
- Raja as Mari
- Munisraj as Munisraj detective
- Veena Venkatesh as Umamaheshwari's mother
- Sowmya Sharada as Umamaheshwari
- Rishi as Kishore, Umamaheshwari's lover
- Sumangali as Kishore's mother
- Nancy Jennifer as Brindha
- Mahesh Prabha as Inspector Arumugam
- Poorni as Jenny
- Archana Harish → Divya Krishnan as Devi
- Meena Sellamuthu as Sandi Rani
- Prem as Rajaram, Singaperumal's friend
- Vasanth Gopinath as Mahendran
- Jaheer Hassain as Sathish
- Manush as Ashok
- Nanjil Nalini as Kottaiswamy's mother
- Sai Sakthi as Kathiravan Natraj, Subramani's brother
- Yuvanraj Nethran as Rajesh
- Birla Bose as Singaravelan I.P.S
- Akila as Nirmala, Bala-Nagu's daughter
- Haripriya as Shobha, Nandhan's fiancé
- Krish as Shobha's elder brother
- Geetha as Geetha
- Deepa as Sornam, Subramani's aunt
- Sri Vidhya as Deepa, Sornam's daughter
- Sadhana as Banumathy, Nandhan's mother
- Dev Anand Sharma as Nandhan, Valli's ex-fiancé, lawyer
- Shamily Sukumar → Sunitha as Shamili Vinod, Vicky's sister
- Satish Kumar as Vinod, Shamili's husband
- Babitha as Maragatham, Vinod's mother
- Krithika Laddu as Sudha, Madhumitha's friend
- Easter as Subbu's friend
- Yamuna as Yamuna

== Original soundtrack ==
The title song was written by lyricist Dr. Kiruthiya, composed by the music director Paulraj and sung by Saindhavi.

=== Soundtrack ===
Track list
No.	Title	Lyrics	Singer(s)	Length
1.	"Kaalam Oru Nathiyena" (காலம் ஒரு நதியென)	Dr. Kiruthiya	Saindhavi	2:24

== Awards and nomination ==
Year	Award	Category	Recipient	Role	Result
2014	Sun Kudumbam Awards	Best Female Negative Role	Rani	Indrasena	Nominated
2014	Sun Kudumbam Awards	Best Mamanar	Poovilangu Mohan	Azhagam Perumal	Nominated
2014	Sun Kudumbam Awards	Best Male Negative Role	Manohar	Bala	Nominated
2018	Sun Kudumbam Awards	Sun Nakshatra Award	Rani	Indrasena	Won
2018	Sun Kudumbam Awards	Best Female Negative Role	Rani	Indrasena	Nominated
2018	Sun Kudumbam Awards	Best Couple	Vidhya Mohan & Raj Kumar Manoharan	Valli & Vicky	Nominated
2018	Sun Kudumbam Awards	Best sister	Vidhya Mohan	Vennila	Won
2018	Sun Kudumbam Awards	Best comedian	Ajay kapoor	Anand	Nominated
2018	Sun Kudumbam Awards	Best Supporting Actor (Male)	Ajay Kapoor	Anand	Nominated
2018	Sun Kudumbam Awards	Best Mamanar	Poovilangu Mohan	Azhagam Perumal	Won

== See also ==
- List of programs broadcast by Sun TV
- List of longest-running Indian television series
