= Rayjan Rajan =

Indian actor

- Occupation: Actor
- Years active: 2011–present
- Spouse: Silpa Rayjan

Rayjan Rajan is an Indian actor who appears in Malayalam-language television shows. He is best known for playing SATHYAJITH IPS in Athmasakhi and producing the film Johny Johny Yes Appa.

== Career ==
He began his career as a model and worked in short films such as Makkachi and Black Hole. In 2012, he played the lead role in the TV series Makal and later pursued a career in engineering. After a hiatus, he returned to Mollywood small screen with Athmasakhi which made him a household name among the Malayali audience. In between he starred in a few shorts films like Blackhole, 3 Guns and Balaji. He also played the lead pair with Mamta Mohandas in the film Johny Johny Yes Appa. He also won the title of TOI Most desirable man on Television 2018 He has also done several modelling assignments. He has also appeared in Popular TV shows like Comedy Circus, Thakarppan Comedy, Star Magic and Aram + Aram = Kinnaram as a participant.

== Television ==
Year	Show	Role	Channel	Ref.
2012–2013	Makal	Jagannathan	Surya TV	
2016–2018	Athmasakhi	Sathyajith IPS	Mazhavil Manorama	
2019–2020	Priyapettaval	Dr.Balu	Mazhavil Manorama	
2020	Bottle Lockdown	Motta vineesh	Flowers TV	
2020–2022	Thinkalkalamaan	Rahul	Surya TV	
2022–2025	Bhavana	Suryadev	Surya TV	
2024–2026	Ishtam Mathram	Mahesh	Asianet	

=== Films ===
Year	Name	Role
2018	Johny Johny Yes Appa	Jayakumar
