= Yakshi – Faithfully Yours =

Yakshi - Faithfully Yours
- Directed by: Abhiram Suresh Unnithan
- Written by: Abhiram Suresh Unnithan
- Based on: Aithihyamala by Kottarathil Sankunni
- Produced by: Madhusoodhanan Mavelikkara
- Starring: Faizal; Avanthika Mohan; Parvati Nair
- Cinematography: Jemin Jom Ayyaneth
- Edited by: Sobin K Soman
- Music by: Aravind Chandrasekhar
- Production company: Sea Shell Movies
- Distributed by: Mulakupaadam Films
- Release date: 14 December 2012 (Kerala)
- Running time: 110 minutes
- Country: India
- Language: Malayalam

Yakshi – Faithfully Yours is a 2012 Malayalam romantic fantasy film written and directed by debutant Abhiram Suresh Unnithan, son of veteran Malayalam director Suresh Unnithan. The film features new faces in the lead roles. The main characters of the film are inspired from the Malayalam mythology work Aithihyamala. The film was released on 14 December 2012.

== Plot ==
Nagayakshi is a celestial creature of lust who comes to Earth and turns into a woman, mates with virginal men, and kills them after she orgasms. Things take a turn when she falls in love with two mortal non-virginal men.

== Cast ==
- Faizal as Vishnu bhattathiri/ unni
- Avanthika Mohan as Nagayakshi
- Ved as Jithu
- Akhil Devan as Kishore
- Shivakumar as Inspector Mukunda Raman
- Parvathy Nair as Meenakshi
- Manoj Madhusoodanan
- Likhiya Jamal as Shreya
- Vishnu Manohar
- Ambika as Unni's mother
- Devan as Appan thampuran

== Production ==
Yakshi – Faithfully Yours is an experimental film dealing with real time film making. The film presents the title character of Yakshi as the one who is not to be looked upon with fear or horror, but with emotions and feelings. The film started its shooting in Olappamanna Mana on 16 January 2012.

== Soundtrack ==
The soundtrack of Yakshi – Faithfully Yours includes four major tracks composed by debutant Aravind Chandrasekhar, with lyrics from veteran poet Devadas and debutant M. T. Pradeep Kumar and one OST track from the band Downtroddence.

No.	Title	Singers	Length
1.	"Irul Nananju Raamazha"	Sangeeth, Neha Nair	4:57
2.	"Manjukaalam"	Neha Nair	4:39
3.	"Mizhiyoram Minnipaayum"	Sreeram Sreekumar, Charu Hariharan	4:56
4.	"Neeharardram"	Abhiram Suresh Unnithan, Aravind Chandrasekhar	2:46
5.	"OST"	The Downtroddence	2:35

== See also ==
- List of Malayalam horror films
