= Sreelaya =

Indian actress

- Born: Laya Jose; Chundaparamba, Kannur district
- Occupation: Actress
- Years active: 2013–present
- Spouses: Chacko (m. 2017, divorced); Robin Cherian (m. 2021)
- Children: 1
- Relatives: Sruthi Lakshmi (sister)

Laya Jose, better known by her screen name Sreelaya, is an Indian actress acting mainly in Malayalam television serials.

== Personal life ==
Laya was born to Jose and cine actress Lissy Jose at Chundaparamba in Kannur district. She has a younger sister Shruthi Lakshmi, also an actress. Sreelaya married Chacko in 2017, but later got divorced. She then married Robin Cherian in 2021. The couple have a daughter.

== Filmography ==
=== Film ===
List of Sreelaya film credits
Year	Film	Role	Notes	Ref.
2013	Kutteem Kolum	Suja		
2015	Maanikyam	Kunju Manikyam		
2015	Compartment	Gayathri		

=== Television ===
List of Sreelaya television credits
Year	Show	Role	Channel	Notes	Ref.
2005	Krishna Kripa Sagaram	Radha	Amrita TV		
2005	Swaram		Amrita TV		
2006	Swarnamayooram	Nandhini	Asianet		
	Kurukshethra				
2013	Kanmani	Thulasi	Surya TV		
2013-2014	Bhagyadevatha	Bhagyalakshmi	Mazhavil Manorama		
2014	Ivide Ingananu Bhai	Guest	Mazhavil Manorama		
2015	Nammal Thammil	Panelist	Mazhavil Manorama		
2015–2017	Moonnumani	Kuttimani	Flowers TV		
2018–2019	Thenum Vayambum	Mallika	Surya TV		
2020	Priyapettaval	Dr. Uma	Mazhavil Manorama	Replacing Avanthika Mohan	
2022	Star Magic	Contestant	Flowers TV	Fun Show	
2022	Top Singer Season 2	Guest	Flowers TV	Music show	
2022	Kuttitharangalude Samsthana Sammelanam	Guest	Flowers TV	Music show	
2026	Bigg Boss 8	Contestant	Asianet	Reality show Evicted Day 14	
