= Haritha G. Nair =

Indian actress

- Born: Kottayam, Kerala
- Occupations: Actress; Nurse
- Years active: 2017–present
- Spouse: V. S. Vinayak (m. 2023)

Haritha G. Nair is an Indian actress who appears in Malayalam-language soap operas and films.

== Early and personal life ==
Haritha is a nurse-turned-actress who hails from Kottayam district of Kerala. She has an elder brother, Hareesh.

She married film editor V. S. Vinayak on 10 November 2023.

== Career ==
Haritha was a finalist in the talent-hunt show Tharodayam in 2018. She made her acting debut with a supporting role, Sreekutty, in soap-opera Kasthooriman.

In 2019, she played a possessed girl, Shivaganga, in horror drama, Unnimaya. From 2020 to 2022, she played the lead role of Keerthi in Thinkalkalamaan.

From 2023-2024, she played the lead role of Shyama, a dusky singer in Shyamambaram. Since 2024, she is playing dual role as Shyama and as her daughter, Radhika in Snehapoorvam Shyama, a sequel to Shyamambaram.

== Filmography ==
=== Films ===
Year	Film	Role	Ref.
2018	Carbon	Leena Mariam George Kodappanakunnel	
2022	Oru Pakka Naadan Premam	Thulasi	
2023	Neru	Advocate Aswathy	

=== Television ===
Year	Show	Role	Channel	Notes	Ref.
2017	Tharodayam	Contestant	Asianet		
2017-2020	Kasthooriman	Sreekutty	Asianet		
2018	Seetha Kalyanam	Herself	Asianet	Guest appearance	
2019	Unnimaya	Sivaganga	Asianet		
2020–2022	Thinkalkalamaan	Keerthi	Surya TV		
2020	Swantham Sujatha	Keerthi	Surya TV	Cameo in promo	
2021	Kaliveedu	Keerthi	Surya TV	Cameo in promo	
2022	Kana Kanmani	Herself	Surya TV	Guest appearance	
2023–2024	Shyamambaram	Shyama	Zee Keralam		
2023	Mangalyam	Shyama	Zee Keralam	Extended cameo	
2024–present	Snehapoorvam Shyama	Shyama(Fida)/Radhika	Zee Keralam	Dual role Sequel to Shyamambaram	
2025	Chembarathy	Shyama	Zee Keralam	Cameo Appearance	

== Awards ==
Year	Award	Category	Work	Result	Ref.
2018	Asianet Television Awards	Best New Face (Female)	Kasthooriman	Won	
