= Parayan Marannathu =

2009 film

- Directed by: Arun S. Bhaskar
- Written by: Sabari Sankar
- Produced by: V S Sheeja
- Starring: Biju Menon; Arun; Lakshmi Sharma; Vidhya Mohan
- Cinematography: Praveen Panicker
- Edited by: K Sreenivas
- Music by: Arun Sidharrth
- Distributed by: Sapthagiri Movies
- Release date: 21 November 2009
- Country: India
- Language: Malayalam

Parayan Marannathu is a 2009 Malayalam film by debutante Arun S. Bhaskar starring Biju Menon, Arun, Lakshmi Sharma and Vidhya Mohan.

== Plot ==
Chandran lives in a small village with his wife Rema and daughter Maalu. Chandran has a neighbour Madhavi who washes clothes for a living. She was born in a rich family but her husband and his family rejected her. Her daughter Gauri is a plus-two student.

Manikandan, a young man in the village, always tries to help Madhavi since Madhavi brought him up after his mother died and he likes Gauri, but Gauri never feels interested in him. Gauri falls in love with Chandran, changing her life completely.

== Cast ==
- Biju Menon as Chandran
- Arun as Manikandan
- Lakshmi Sharma as Rema
- K. P. A. C. Lalitha
- Vidhya Mohan as Gauri
- Harish Siva as Nair
- Kalaranjini
- Suraj Venjaramood
- Lalu Paul
- Usha
