= Lakshmi Sharma =

Indian actress

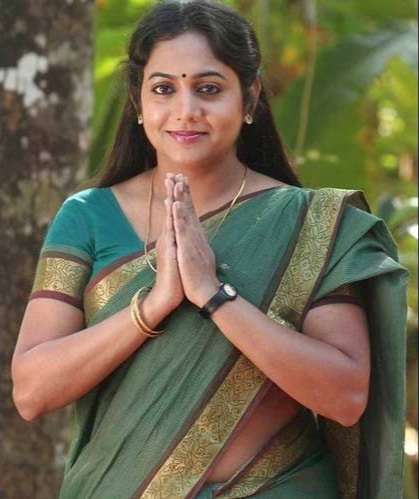
- Born: Vijayawada, Andhra Pradesh, India
- Other name: Lahari
- Occupation: Actress
- Years active: 2000–2018

Lakshmi Sharma, mononymously known as Lahari (in the Telugu film industry), is an Indian actress. After debuting as supporting to character roles in Telugu cinema, she made her official lead role in Malayalam cinema in 2006 with Palunku. She has also acted in few Kannada films as well.

== Career ==
She hails from Vijayawada, Andhra Pradesh. She was born into a Brahmin family to a Telugu father and a Kannada mother.

After her parents' retirement, the family settled in Hyderabad. She wanted to become an actress in the Telugu film industry and debuted in a supporting role in E. V. V. Satyanarayana's Ammo! Okato Tareekhu (2000). She went on to lead roles in the films Manamiddaram and Vacchina Vaadu Suryudu, which failed, before she got a role in the Chiranjeevi film Indra (2002). Her role as the niece of Chiranjeevi's character in the film was noted. She said that other than that film she hadn't "any moment of luck or happiness" in the industry. Disappointed with the response in Telugu, she moved to the Malayalam film industry where she rose to fame.

She made her Malayalam debut in Palunku in 2006. Although the film did not do well, she was continuously offered roles and was one of the busiest and most prolific actresses in Malayalam cinema by 2009 though she was mocked for her poor performances and eventually faded out.

== Filmography ==
=== Film ===
Year	Title	Role	Language	Notes
2000	Ammo! Okato Tareekhu	Parvathi	Telugu	
2000	College	Rekha	Telugu	
2001	Maa Ayana Sundarayya	Prameela	Telugu	
2002	Indra	Nandini	Telugu	
2002	Vachina Vaadu Suryudu	Gowri	Telugu	
2002	Manamiddaram	Manasa	Telugu	
2003	Mulli Roja	Roja	Tamil	
2004	Sorry Naaku Pallaindhi	Padma	Telugu	
2004	Yarige Beku Ee Samsara	Gruhalekshmi	Kannada	
2004	No	Sandhya	Telugu	
2004	Amma Meda Ottu	Lekshmi	Telugu	
2004	Aaruguru Pativratalu	Sarala	Telugu	
2004	Nija	Chandrakala	Kannada	
2005	Youth	Sathya	Telugu	
2005	Radha Gopalam	Gowri	Telugu	
2005	Mahanandi	Anitha	Telugu	
2006	Konte Kurrallu	lekshmi	Telugu	
2006	Palunku	Susamma	Malayalam	
2007	Nagaram	Mayamma	Malayalam	
2007	Ayur Rekha	Dr. Aparna	Malayalam	
2007	Missing	Meena	Telugu	
2007	Best Friends	Meena	Malayalam	
2008	Kerala Police	Sanjana	Malayalam	
2008	Chithrasalabhangalude Veedu	Suja	Malayalam	
2008	Kanichukulangarayil CBI	Susan	Malayalam	
2009	Parayan Marannathu	Rema	Malayalam	
2009	Boomi Malayalam	Meenakshi	Malayalam	
2009	Shudharil Shudhan	Janaki	Malayalam	
2009	Thirunakkara Perumal	Sreekutty	Malayalam	
2009	Swami	Sreedevi	Malayalam	
2009	Paribhavam	Sruthi	Malayalam	
2009	Pramukhan	Dancer	Malayalam	Special appearance
2009	Passenger	Gayathri	Malayalam	
2009	Circus Circus	Prahala	Telugu	
2010	Thaskara Lahala	Varsha	Malayalam	
2010	Advocate Lakshmanan - Ladies Only	Mary Thomas	Malayalam	
2010	Drona 2010	Gauri	Malayalam	
2010	Karayilekku Oru Kadal Dooram	Devi	Malayalam	
2011	Makaramanju	Bhageerathi	Malayalam	
2011	Priyappetta Nattukare	Priyankari (Fake)	Malayalam	
2011	Collector	Gouri	Malayalam	
2011	Rama Rama Raghu Rama	Vidya	Kannada	
2011	Dudde Doddappa	Lakshmi	Kannada	
2012	Achante Aanmakkal	Meena	Malayalam	
2012	Oru Kudumba Chithram	Mallika	Malayalam	
2012	Veendum Kannur	Kanaka	Malayalam	
2012	Kalikaalam	Suja Goutham	Malayalam	
2012	Oka Ammayi Oka Abbayi	Rukku	Telugu	
2012	Pratheekshayode	Naani	Malayalam	
2013	Breaking News Live	Farmer	Malayalam	Special Appearance in the song
2013	Ayaal	Janaki	Malayalam	
2013	Climax	Aparna	Malayalam	
2013	Thekku Thekkoru Deshathu	Anjitha	Malayalam	
2014	Flat No.4B	Susamma	Malayalam	
2014	On the Way	Teacher	Malayalam	
2014	Bad Boys	Greeshma	Malayalam	
2015	Ellam Chettante Ishtam Pole	Yashodha	Malayalam	
2015	Ente Cinema- The Movie Festival	Gayathri Varma	Malayalam	
2017	Nilavariyathe	Naani	Malayalam	
2017	Stethoscope	Dr. Bhagyalakshmi	Malayalam	
2018	Captain	Sathyan's mother	Malayalam	

=== Television ===
Year	Serial	Role	Language	Channel
2004	Durga	Durga	Telugu	E TV
2004	Aloukika	Neelambari	Telugu	E TV
2006–2008	Radha Madhu	Julie	Telugu	Maa TV
2008	Sree Mahabhagavatham		Malayalam	Asianet
2009	Devi Mahatmyam	Shakambari	Malayalam	Asianet
