= Story Kathe =

- Directed by: Jagadish K. R.
- Written by: Jagadish K. R.
- Screenplay by: Jagadish K. R.
- Produced by: Jagadish K. R.
- Starring: Prathap Narayan; Parvathy Nair; Thilak Shekar; Neha Patel
- Cinematography: S. R. Sathish Kumar
- Edited by: Sachin
- Music by: Vasu Dixit; Sathish Babu
- Production company: Nirvana Films
- Release date: 24 May 2013
- Running time: 118 minutes
- Country: India
- Language: Kannada

Story Kathe is a 2013 Indian Kannada-language psychological thriller film written and directed by Jagadish K. R. It stars Prathap Narayan and Thilak Shekar.

Filming began in 2012 and went through several revisions. It finally opened in 2013 to positive reviews, but earned less than expected at the box office.

== Cast ==
- Prathap Narayan as Veera
- Thilak Shekar as Rajiv
- Parvathy Nair as Pallavi
- Neha Patel
- Aaryan Achukatla

== Soundtrack ==
Story Kathe

Soundtrack album by Vasu Dixit, Sathish Babu
- Released: 19 May 2012
- Genre: Feature film soundtrack
- Length: 25:23
- Label: Saregama

Vasu Dixit and Sathish Babu composed the film's background score and music for its soundtrack, with its lyrics written by Santhosh Nayak. The soundtrack album consists six tracks.

Tracklist
No.	Title	Lyrics	Singer(s)	Length
1.	"Charuthara Shashi Moreyol"	Santhosh Nayak	Anuradha Bhat, Santhosh	4:17
2.	"Badukoke Saithavne"	Santhosh Nayak	Vasu Dixit	4:55
3.	"Nadi Nee Yodha"	Santhosh Nayak	Santhosh, Harsha, Akanksha Badami	3:42
4.	"Charuthara Shashi Moreyol (Version 2)"	Santhosh Nayak	Anuradha Bhat, Santhosh	5:05
5.	"Badukoke Saithavne (Version 2)"	Santhosh Nayak	Vasu Dixit	3:45
6.	"Charuthara Shashi Moreyol (Remix)"	Santhosh Nayak	DJ Saheer Rahman	3:39
Total length:				25:23

== Release ==
=== Critical reception ===
A critic from The Times of India wrote that "Director K R Jagadish has given a different kind of a movie for the Sandalwood. There is freshness in the script and narration as the director has tried to tell two different stories on parallel tracks".

== Awards ==
3rd South Indian International Movie Awards

- SIIMA Award for Best Female Debutant – Parvathy Nair
