= Bhagyadevatha (TV series) =

- Genre: Drama
- Story by: Kalyani
- Directed by: Shiju Aroor
- Starring: See below
- Country of origin: India
- Original language: Malayalam
- No. of seasons: 1
- No. of episodes: 206

Production
- Producer: T.K.S Raj
- Production company: Daynight Creations

Original release
- Network: Mazhavil Manorama
- Release: 16 December 2013 – 17 October 2014

Bhagyadevatha was an Indian television series that lasted from 16 December 2013 to 17 October 2014, with a total of 206 episodes.Mazhavil Manorama channel aired this show starring actress Sreelaya.

== Plot ==
Bhagyadevatha tells the story of a girl named Bhagyalakshmi who has some special power of sixth sense. She is the adopted daughter of Kaliyarmadam kovilakam which is a famous family in their locality. Bhagyalakshmi is the best friend of Shivakami who the only daughter of Kaliyarmadam Parameshwari. After facing so many problems Bhagyalakshmi gets a better life in the end.

== Cast ==
=== Main ===
- Sreelaya as Bhagyalakshmi
- Lekshmi Priya as Shivakami

=== Recurring ===
- Thara Kalyan as Kaliyar Madom Parameshwari
- Sadiq
- Murali Krishnand as Krishnan Unni
- Nikhil as Balaraman
- Bipin Jose as Simon
- Zeenath as Elsa
- Valsala Menon as Rahel Amma
- Chandran as Peter Mash
- Jismy
