= Athmasakhi =

- Genre: Indian Soap Opera; Drama; Romance
- Written by: Sangeetha Mohan
- Directed by: Mohan Kupleri
- Starring: Avanthika Mohan; See below
- Country of origin: India
- Original language: Malayalam
- No. of seasons: 1
- No. of episodes: 545

Production
- Producer: Shobhana Umadharan
- Production location: Thiruvananthapuram Kerala
- Production company: Souparnika Creations

Original release
- Network: Mazhavil Manorama
- Release: 11 July 2016 – 20 July 2018

Athmasakhi (ml; ആത്മസഖി) is an Indian soap opera which launched by Mazhavil Manorama channel on 11 July 2016. The show stars Malayalam actress Avanthika Mohan and Rayjan Rajan in the lead roles. It took the slot of 7:00 PM and was later shifted to 6:30 PM and due to high TRP ratings it was shifted to 7:00 PM.

== Plot summary ==
The story revolves around the lives of a City Commissioner, Sathyajith and the eldest daughter of rich couples Madhavan Menon and Bhagyalakshmi, Dr. Nanditha. Both are brought up in the Manimuttam family. Madhavan Menon is the head of the family and a rich business magnate who does care all about his richness and bonding as a successful personality among the family and the public.

Niya, the youngest daughter of Madhavan Menon and Bhagyalakshmi, Nanditha and Sathyajith were brought up as siblings but as the time and age passes through, Nanditha and Sathyajith fall in love with each other and dreams out the world after their marriage and waits for that actual moment to present this matter to Madhavan Menon and the family. Charulatha who is in search of her father joins the family. On her way she is chased by some goons and it is headed by Jeevan. However she survives and gets admitted in a hospital but loses her memory after the incident. Sathyan is assigned to investigate the case.

During the course of his investigation he discovers that Charulatha is Menon's daughter whom he sired in a pre-marital affair. This disturbs Sathyan heavily and even causes problems between him and Nandu as he is not able to open up it to her. This however annoys her and as a result she makes some mistakes at the hospital adding to their drift. She shares her miseries with her senior doctor and colleague Dr. Abhilash who believes she loves him. Meanwhile, Charulatha regains her memory and Sathyan informs Menon about her. This causes Menon to have a heart attack and he is admitted in the hospital. Sathyajith is suspended as he was not capable to find the culprit behind Charulatha case. After his treatment Menon meets Charulatha and apologises for neglecting her mother as his mother was so adamant of not allowing Prabhavathy (Charulatha's mother) to be her daughter in law. From there he tries his best to provide Charulatha with love and affection and Sathyan helps him with this. Meanwhile, Sathyan and Nandu patch up, their relationship builds up and they cross all the limits. As fate takes a turn Menon forces Sathyan to marry Charulatha so that he can give his daughter the love she was rejected. Unable to tell him about his love for Nanditha he is in a way emotionally blackmailed by Menon. Nandu however mistakes him to have cheated her as Menon tells everyone that Sathyan wanted to marry Charulatha. While all these Menon and Bhagi decides to get Nandu married off to Dr Abhilash as they mistake them to be in love. They fix their marriage without her knowledge. Nandu who is pregnant with Sathyan's child is helpless and by situations is forced to marry Abhilash on the same day Sathyan and Charulatha gets married. Sathyan with still Nandu in his heart denies a marital relationship with Charulatha which makes her sad. Nandu is also hesitant in starting a marital relationship with Abhilash and lives in the fear of getting caught. After a few days Abhilash learns about her pregnancy via her friend who is a doctor. This hurts and angers Abhilash and he rages out at Nandu who apologises to him. He however covers this truth as he doesn't want to hurt his mother and sister who believes it's his child. (Although this is his reasoning from his characterisation it is evident that he doesn't want to let go of Nandu as he loves her ardently). Despite all of these Abhilash becomes a drunkard and loses concentration in his job.

Nandu, who feels guilty and at the same time annoyed of all these, asks him to stop drinking and this becomes a heated argument. Abhilash's sister happen to hear it and this becomes a big problem. Nandu is sent back to her house and is hated by her parents. She happens to hear a conversation between them saying how much unbearable pain and loss of integrity she had caused them. This saddens her greatly and she attempts suicide. But she is saved on time by Sathyan who feels extremely guilty for all these. Nanditha survives only to realise that Menon (her father) has decided to abort the baby and send her back to Abhilash who is ready to accept her. (Menon tries to woo Abhilash by offering him all his wealth but he says he loves Nandu and can accept her without the money). Nanditha objects this as she wants her child. But her objection is neglected by Menon even after Bhagi persists. This breaks Nandu's heart and she leaves the home into ambiguity and loneliness leaving a letter saying she cannot live without her child. All of Sathyan's attempt to find her fails but she ends up in the safe hands of Chinnamachi and Pailichayan, a childless couple. They take care of her like their own daughter and adapts into her new name "Indu" who was their relative who died. Nandu starts a new life there and she goes as the maid to Thottathil Bungalow to support Chinnamachi and Pailichayan. Later she gives birth to a baby girl "Kingini mol". while all this occur Niya (Nandu's sister) marries Jeevan (who earlier attempted to molest Charulatha).

Jeevan (who knows that Charulatha is Menon's daughter) continues blackmail her into satisfying his sexual needs. Helpless Charu decides to end her life but is caught on time by Sathyan. She tells Sathyan everything and Jeevan is arrested much to the anger of Niya (who already hates them for ruining her sister's life). In this anger she reveals to the family that Sathyan is the father of Nandu's child. The whole family leaves him and Charu says that she hates him and would never want to live with him as she complains that he never loved her but only loved Nandu. Menon is paralysed. Sathyan leaves the place asking for a transfer. As a turn of events he gets transferred to where Nandu is living and there he explains to her everything. He asks her to rekindle their relationship and invites her to his life again. Meanwhile, at Manimuttam, Jeevan is released and he acquires all of their property and Niya realises his true colours. Charu decides to return to Sathyan. Charu, who is greedy and selfish threatens Nanditha and wants Sathyan to love her. Sathyan who says that he married her only because of the pressure of Menon and that he loves Nandu and her child. Shamelessly she asks him to have sex with her so that she can be equal to Nanditha. Charu swears at Kingini mol and tries her best to stop Sathyan from interacting with his daughter. She threatens Nandu to never return to Manimuttam and never lets anyone at Manimuttam know about Nandu despite knowing that if Nandu returns they can acquire all their property Jeevan has stolen.

She also forces Nanditha to return to Abhilash, who still loves her. She agrees to do so because of Charulatha and also everyone in Manimuttam wants that. She goes to Abhilash's house but his family do not accept her bur they live there. Sathyan is still in love with Nandu and is reluctant to see Charu as his wife. But she begs with Nanditha to tell Sathyan to accept her and because Nandu says that they start a real marital relationship. Meanwhile, Jeevan is thrown out and an arrest warrant is issued with him but he escapes from police custody. Charulatha is now pregnant and she flaunts about it. As a revenge Jeevan kidnaps Charulatha and amidst of Sathyan trying to save her, Charu falls down and her child is aborted. Jeevan is jailed. After the treatment Charu and Manimuttam realises that Charu cannot become a mother anymore because of the fall. Distraught, she tries to kill herself but is saved. She turns mad and starts seeing Kingini mol as her own child and is treated in a mental asylum. Nandu is forced to give her Kingini mol so that Charu can be cured. Later Charu is cured but her pain still continues. Nanditha gets pregnant again and her family life blossoms with Abhilash, Kingini mol and their expecting child. Charu is jealous of this and asks for Kingini mol, saying that all the struggles Nandu took to bring up Kingini are all the things in the past and that she should be given Kingini mol. Menon and Bhagi support her. Abhi pressured Nanditha and eventually she had to give kingini to Charu. Abhi’s mother and sister poisons Abhi's mind. Nanditha leaves Abhi and files for a divorce. Charu becomes restless regarding this and she doubts Sathyan and this leads to several issues between Sathyan and Charu. Sathyan leaves Charu taking along Kingini. Sathyan and Nanditha starts to live together. Abhi refuses to give divorce to Nanditha but she creates trouble to his family and eventually Abhi had to give her divorce. Cheru too refused to divorce Sathyan. She humiliate him in front of media leading to Sathyan’s suspension. Charu is found dead. Sathyan and Nanditha are arrested. Later Nanditha is bailed due to lack of evidence. She starts an investigation along CI Roy. They initially suspect Abhi but eventually with Sathyan’s guidance they were able to find that Jeevan had murdered Charu. Sathyan joins back as police commissioner. Sathyan and Nanditha finally marry.

== Cast ==
- Avanthika Mohan / Divya Binu as Dr. Nanditha / Indu
- Rayjan Rajan as Commissioner Sathyajith IPS, Menon and Bhagyalakshmi's adoptive son
- Manoj Nair as Madhava Menon, Nanditha, Niya and Charu's father
- Beena Antony as Bhagyalakshmi, Menon's wife and Nandhita and Niya's mother
- Chilanga S. Deedu (earlier played by Sree Raksha) as Charulatha, Sathyajith's wife
- Pratheeksha G Pradeep as Niya
- Jishin Mohan as Jeevan, Niya's ex-husband
- Sanjeev M. Pillai as Dr. Abhilash Raghav, Nanditha's ex-husband
- Maneesh Krishna as Sudhi
- Sanjay Kumar as Abhilash
- Arjun as (Nandithas Son, And Sathyajiths Young Son)
- Sreelakshmi as Prabhavathi Charulatha's mother
- Pramil Sidharth
- Swathi Thara as Sreekala Satyan's sister
  - Narayanan and Devika's daughter
- M. R. Gopakumar as Narayanan
  - Satyan and Sreekala's father
- Prem Lal as Jayan
- Sreekala as Chinnamma
- Vindhuja Vikraman as Aparna IAS
- Ranjith Lal
- Kuttyedathi Vilasini
- Rajeev pala
- Faizal Razi
- Sini Prasad
- Boney Sebastian
- Sangeetha Mohan as herself in promo
