= Kammala =

Indian actress

Vidhya r kumar
- Born: 12 April 1987 (age 39); Kottayam, Kerala, India
- Occupations: Actress; Dancer; Model
- Years active: 2005 – present

Vidhya is an Indian actress in the Malayalam and Tamil film and television industry.

== Filmography ==
Year	Film	Role	Language	Notes
2005	Vacation	Sudha	Malayalam	
2007	Dhandayuthapani	Thenmozhi	Tamil	Credited as Shivani Sri
2009	Parayan Marannathu	Gauri	Malayalam	
2010	Neelambari	Lakshmi	Malayalam	
2010	Cheriya Kallanum Valiya Policum	Soumini	Malayalam	
2010	Aaravadhu Vanam	Malar/Saami	Tamil	
2010	Samagama	Nandini	Kannada	
2011	Maharaja Talkies	Yamuna	Malayalam	
2011	Swapnamalika	-	Malayalam	
2011	Bellariraja	-	Malayalam	
2011	Karuvarai		Tamil	
2012	Ee Thirakkinidayil	Veena	Malayalam	
2012	MLA Mani: Patham Classum Gusthiyum	Meenakshi	Malayalam	
2012	Red Alert	Devika Menon (Devasri)	Malayalam	
2012	Akilan	Akhila	Tamil	
2012	Kaadhal Paadhai	Pavithra	Tamil	
2013	Yathrakkoduvil	Sana	Malayalam	
2014	Ner Ethir	Isha	Tamil	
2015	Priya		Kannada	
2015	Celebrate Happiness	Herself	English	Video Song
2018	Uzhaikkum Paadhai	Amudha	Tamil	
2021	Kaalchilambu	Karthika's sister	Malayalam	Shot in 2008
2022	Oru Pakka Nadan Premakadha	Vidya	Malayalam	

== Television ==
Year	Serial	Character	Channel	Language	References
2013–2019	Valli	Valli & Vennila	Sun TV	Tamil	235 - 1961 Episodes
2014–2015	Ente Pennu	Bhama	Mazhavil Manorama	Malayalam	
2019	Unnimaya	Nikitha (Unnimaya)	Asianet	Malayalam	
2020–2023	Abhiyum Naanum	Meena	Sun TV	Tamil	
2021	Va Da Da	Herself	Sun Music	Tamil	
2021	Vanathai Pola	Meena	Sun TV	Tamil	Special Appearance
2021	Vanakkam Tamizha	Herself	Sun TV	Tamil	2 Episodes (January & July Episode)
2021	Poova Thalaya	Contestant & Herself	Sun TV	Tamil	
2022	Crazy Stars	Herself	Mazhavil Manorama	Malayalam	
2023–2024	Mayamayuram	Gauri	Zee Keralam	Malayalam	
2025–present	Ayali	Indrani	Zee Tamil	Tamil	
