= Swantham Sujatha =

2020 Malayalam-language TV series

- Also known as: Verum Veetammayalla Jeevitham
- Genre: soap opera Drama
- Created by: B C Vision
- Written by: Sangeetha Mohan (Episodes 1 to 61) Raajesh Puthanpurayil (Episode 62 to 677)
- Screenplay by: Sangeetha Mohan (Episodes 1 to 83) Raajesh Puthanpurayil (Episode 84 - 675)
- Story by: Sangeetha Mohan (Episodes 1 to 83) Raajesh Puthanpurayil (Episode 84 - 675)
- Directed by: Anzar Khan
- Starring: Chandra Lakshman; Kishor Satya
- Theme music composer: Shyam Dharman
- Opening theme: "Aakaasa ponnvettam aalolam veezhumppol"
- Ending theme: "Nizharaakum Thaliralle"
- Composers: Bharath Kumar Vazhappally (Lyrics); Arun (BGM)
- Country of origin: India
- Original language: Malayalam
- No. of seasons: 1
- No. of episodes: 677

Production
- Executive producer: Vaidehi Ramamoorthy
- Producer: Vision Time India Private Limited
- Production locations: Kochi, Munnar
- Cinematography: Pushpan Divakaran
- Editor: Harimukham
- Camera setup: Multi-camera
- Running time: 20-25 minutes
- Production company: Vision Time India PVT.LTD

Original release
- Network: Surya TV
- Release: 16 November 2020 – 12 March 2023

Swantham Sujatha (transl. Yours Faithfully Sujatha) was a 2020-2023 Indian Malayalam language television soap opera launched in Surya TV on 16 November 2020 and ended on 12 March 2023. It also streams on YouTube and Sun NXT. Chandra Lakshman plays the titular character alongside Kishor Satya. Both returned to Malayalam television after a hiatus. This show was temporary stopped due to COVID-19 from May 21, 2021, and was relaunched on July 5, 2021.

Since its reception the serial is the top rated serial and became the first in TRP chart for month, unless at the starting of Kaliveedu serial.

From its reception the serial aired at 9:00 pm, but from 26 August 2021 onwards the serial aired from Monday to Saturday at 9:30 pm. then from 24 July the serial aired from Monday to Sunday 7:30pm. Then from 28 November the serial aired from Monday to Sunday at 6:00pm replacing Nethra serial. Due to its time change the serial lost its high viewer lost its TRP rating.

== Plot ==
A homemaker devoted to her family sees her life change when, after spending several years at home, she begins a career as a radio jockey.

== Cast ==
=== Lead ===
- Chandra Lakshman as Sujatha (Suja) a.k.a. R.J. Swantham Sujatha: Prakashan's ex-wife; Aparna and Abhi's mother. A homemaker who lacks education and considers family as her world. She become an R.J. in Red FM after her divorce. (2020-2023)
- Kishor Satya as Prakashan: Sujatha's ex-husband; Mahilamani Amma's son; Aparna and Abhi's father. He works at Future Solar group and get divorced from Sujatha because of his illegitimate relationship with Ruby. Again Prakshan marries Sujatha(2020-2023)
- Anu Nair as Ruby: A divorcee and Sujatha's best friend who leads an illegal relationship with Prakashan, who is also her colleague at Future solar. (2020-2023)(Main Antagonist)

=== Recurring ===
- Pria Menon as Manimangalath Mahilamani Amma: Prakashan's mother; Sujatha's mother-in-law. (2020-2023)
- Swathikaa as Aparna (Appu): Sujatha and Prakashan's daughter. (2020-2023)
- Manaved as Abhi: Sujatha and Prakashan's son. (2020-2023)
- Tosh Christy as Adam John a.k.a. Joekuttan: Advocate and youngest Son of Sara who helps Sujatha (2021-2023)
- Amith as Chandran
  - PWD contractor, husband of Praseetha and Prakashan's brother-in-law
- Gautham Praveen
  - Son of Praseetha and Chandran, grand child of Mahilamaniamma
- Gouri
  - Elder daughter of Praseetha and Chandran, grand child of Mahilamaniamma
- Jayakumar Parameswaran Pillai as Jayan
  - Sujatha's elder brother, husband of Latha
- Sangeetha Shivan as Lathika
  - Sujatha's sister-in-law, w/o of Jayan
- Sunil Parackal as Kabir
- Nitha Promy as Thara
  - Sujatha's elder sister
- Pala Aravindan
  - Father of Sujatha, Jayan and Thara
- Usharani (Photo appearance)
  - Mother of Sujatha, Jayan and Thara
- Rashmi Jayagopal / Kavitha Lakshmi as Sara Aunty
  - Fan of RJ Sujatha, retired teacher, mother of Adam and owner of Jerusalem.
- Yadhukrishnan as Avarachan
  - Adam's elder brother
- Manju Shaji as Ambili
  - Sara aunty's domestic helper
- Shemi Martin as ACP Ayisha Begum IPS
  - An Orphan, Adam's wife who later turns out to be City ACP
- Murugan Panachumoodu as Murugesan
  - Domestic help cum best friend of Adam
- Ponnus Anil as Chandana a.k.a. Chandu
  - Abhi's crush in neighbourhood area
- Harisree Martin
- Boban Alummoodan as Sajith
  - Local goon and Ex-husband of Ruby (Second Husband)
- Sandra Balan as Sandhya Rani
- Kiran Raj as Circle Inspector Alex
- Cherthala Lalitha as Molly Chechi
  - Sujatha's Neighbor
- Landwin Crizz as Pranav
  - Appu's boyfriend, a spoilt brat
- Vishnu Pillai as Vishnu
  - Illegal Drug businessman, friend of Pranav who tries to kidnap Appu
- Nithul Vazhayil as Jijo
  - Pranav's best friend and Vishnu's secret keeper who tries to kidnap Appu
- Devasurya as Veena
  - Program Coordinator of Swantham Sujatha/ Pranayapoorvam Sujatha on Red FM, who supports Sujatha
- Jiffin George as Shivaranjini
  - Project staff at Future solar group; subordinate of Ruby who hates her
- Deepika Mohan as Dr. Mersykutty
  - Gynaecologist, personal doctor of Ruby
- Manu Martin Pallippadan as Dr. Sevi Skariah
  - Physician, Veena's lover
- Veena Santhosh as Adv. Reena Abraham
  - Ruby's close friend Junior Advocate to Yogiraj who handles ruby's divorce case
- Ameya Nair as Adv. Ancy
  - Reena's colleague and leading advocate in high court, Swaminathan'a junior
- Tony as Mukundan
  - Groom who wishes to Marry Sujatha
- Manju Stanley as Suma, House Owner of Ruby
- Ibrahim Kutty as Albert
  - Owner of a popular advertising agency
- Ananya Kumari Alex as Sanju
  - Renowned makeup artist and friend of Veena who helps Appu from Ruby's Trafficking team.
- Jeeshma K George as Anitha
  - HR manager of Future solar group who traps Ruby and Prakashan
- Ambarish as Harihara Poduwal
  - Vasudevan's younger brother, Ruby's brother in law and IT professional
- Ranju Lakshmi as Doctor
- Anzil as Darshan
- Sini Varghese
- Darshana Das
- Raji Menon
- Nancy
- Sreelekshmi Das as Chandana (Chandhu)
- Ann rose
- Joshy Mahatma as Aani Ashari

=== Cameo appearance ===
- Saiju Kurup as himself (Episode 137–140)
  - Co-actor of Sujatha in Heavely diamonds advertisement
- Vinu Mohan as Director Vinu (Episode 137–138)
  - Director of Heavenly Diamonds advertisement
- Sreeram Ramachandran as Vasudevan Poduwal (Episodes 133–135)
  - Ruby's First husband, a renowned temple artist based out of Palakkad who was cheated by Ruby
- Sruthi Lakshmi as Angel
  - Joe's (Adam John) wife (dead) [Photo Presence]
- Gayathri Varsha as Judge at Family Court
- Santhosh Keezhattoor as Adv. Swaminathan (Episode 178–179)
- Sadhika Venugopal as Adv. Sushma Omprakash (recurring)

=== Guest appearance in promo ===
- Haritha G Nair
- Manu Nair
- Malavika Krishnadas
- Krishna
- Jeethu Joseph
- Uma Nair
- Shalu Menon
- Vishnuprasad
- Ajay Thomas
- Sreedevi Anil
- Binsa

== Soundtrack ==
No.	Title	Lyrics	Music	Singers	Length
1.	"Aakaasa ponnvettam aalolam veezhumppol" "ആകാശ പൊൻവെട്ടം ആലോളം വീഴുമ്പോൾ"	Bharat Kumar Vazhappilly	Shyam Dharman	Chithra Arun Govind Velayudhan	2:34
2.	"Jeevithamonnane koottikettaan paniyaane" "ജീവിതമൊന്നാണെ കൂട്ടികെട്ടാൻ പണിയാണെ"				0:50
Total length:					3:24
