= Unnimaya =

- ഉണ്ണിമായ
- Genre: Drama; Psychological thriller Supernatural
- Written by: Jayaraj Vijayan
- Story by: Ananthu S Vijay
- Directed by: Saji piravom Shyju Suresh
- Starring: Vidhya Mohan
- Country of origin: India
- Original language: Malayalam
- No. of seasons: 1
- No. of episodes: 48

Production
- Producers: Anish Mohan, Vipin Chandran, Jayaraj Vickraman
- Production location: Kerala
- Editor: Anandhu s Vijay
- Camera setup: Vishnu Nair
- Production company: M Star Communication

Original release
- Network: Asianet
- Release: 26 August – 1 November 2019

Unnimaya is an Indian Malayalam psychological horror thriller television series that aired on Asianet from 26 August 2019 starring Vidhya Vinu Mohan and Haritha G Nair. The show went off air by 1 November 2019. It was a planned finite series.The series opened with 7+TRP rating earning good job at trp rating.

== Plot ==
Nikita aka Unnimaya often gets nightmares which turn out to be true. One such nightmare has a disastrous end and involves her daughter. Will Unnimaya decode her link with these dreams before they ruin her life?

== Cast ==
- Vidhya Mohan as Nikita aka Unnimaya
- Haritha G Nair as Sivaganga
- Baby Alia Wasim as Vedamol
- Kishor as Narendran
- Balan Parakkal as Ramabhadran
- Kiran Raj as Musafir
- Surjith Purohit as Niranjan
- A.K.Anand as Sankaran
- Anand Krishnan as Sanakan
- Anand Narayan as Prakash Babu
- Muhammed Rafi as DYSP Lijo John
- Firoz as George
- Ambili sunil as Sugandhi
- Devan Kakkad as Moosad
- Sarath Swamy
- Sumi Surendran
- Jinsa mathew as Jesmi
- Krishna Sharma TK as Poojari
- Sudarshana Pai
- Sumi Santhosh
- Archana Menon
