= Avanthika Mohan =

Indian actress

Avantika Mohan
- Born: Priyanka; 8 June 1990 (age 36); Dubai, United Arab Emirates
- Citizenship: India
- Occupations: Actress, model, dancer
- Years active: 2012–present

Priyanka, better known by her stage name Avantika Mohan is an Indian actress and model. She made her feature film debut with Yakshi – Faithfully Yours and later earned popularity through the TV series Athmasakhi.

== Early life ==
Avanthika Mohan was born and brought up in Dubai to Malayalee parents from Calicut, Kerala. She returned to Kerala to pursue a modelling career and won the Miss Malabar 2011 title and also the subtitle Miss Perfect 2010. She is a dancer and had taken training for it. After winning the beauty pageant, she began to receive acting offers and decided to enter the film industry.

== Career ==
She made her debut in the 2012 experimental film Yakshi – Faithfully Yours, directed by Abhiram Suresh Unnithan, featuring all newcomers in the lead roles. The film saw Avanthika playing the titular character of a "snake ghost" named Nagayakshi, a snake who turns into a woman after coming to the planet. In 2013, she was part of the Malayalam comedy flick Mr Bean- The Laugh Riot, after which she was seen in Neelakasham Pachakadal Chuvanna Bhoomi. She next played a lead role in crocodile love story. She made her Tamil film debut with the horror film Aalamaram (2014). Her next releases were Vundile Manchi Kalam Mundu Munduna, her first Telugu film, and debutant director Shyam Mohan's thriller 8:20 released and the movie went on well she got good appreciation for her performance from the Critics and the audiences. She had signed film Male Baruva Munna, an Oriya movie and a Hindi movie directed by Samagra Ganesh is based on a true story. She has also signed Rajavin Parvai Raniyin Pakkam, to be directed by Azhagu Raj.

Television debut

In May 2016, she signed into play lead role in TV series Athmasakhi in Malayalam language in which she plays a bold and modern character Nanditha who is a doctor by profession. Later in June she made her Telugu Television debut through Raja Rani in which she plays a strong and innocent school teacher. She is getting positive reviews from both TV series. She twice received best actress awards back to back. After a sabbatical she is paired up with Rajyan Rajan after Athmasakhi in the new series Priyapettaval which is going on-air in Mazhavil Manorama from late 2019 which portrays the misunderstandings in married life.

== Personal life ==
Avantika married Anil Kumar Kainth in 2017. The couple has a son Rudraunsh Kainth.

== Filmography ==
Year	Film	Role	Language	Notes
2012	Yakshi – Faithfully Yours	Nagayakshi	Malayalam	
2013	Mr Bean	Neetha	Malayalam	
2013	Neelakasham Pachakadal Chuvanna Bhoomi	Fatima	Malayalam	
2013	Crocodile Love Story	Nithya	Malayalam	
2014	Aalamaram	Malarkodi	Tamil	
2014	Vundile Manchi Kalam Mundu Munduna	Ujjwala	Telugu	
2014	8 : 20	Ruchi	Malayalam	
2016	Preethiyalli Sahaja		Kannada	
2018	Rajavin Paarvai Raniyin Pakkam	Avantika	Tamil	
2019	Gara	Akasmika	Kannada	
2025	Dheeram	Radhika S Nair	Malayalam	

== Television ==
Year	Film	Role	Language	Channel	Notes	Ref.
2015-2016	Shivakami	Shivakami	Malayalam	Surya TV		
2016–2018	Athmasakhi	Dr. Nanditha / Indu	Malayalam	Mazhavil Manorama	Replaced by Divya Binu	
2016	Raaja Raani	Shailaja	Telugu	MAA TV		
2019-2020	Priyapettaval	Dr. Uma	Malayalam	Mazhavil Manorama	Replaced by Sreelaya	
2021–2023	Thoovalsparsham	Sreya Nandini IPS	Malayalam	Asianet		
2021	Start Music Season 3	Herself	Malayalam	Asianet	Participant	
2022	Asianet Super Challenge	Herself	Malayalam	Asianet	Participant	
2022	Mounaragam	Shreya	Malayalam	Asianet	Guest appearance	
2022	Comedy Stars Season 3	Herself	Malayalam	Asianet	Guest appearance	
2022	Start Music Season 4	Herself	Malayalam	Asianet	Participant	
2022	Koodevide	Shreya	Malayalam	Asianet	Guest appearance	
2023–2024	Manimuthu	Kavya	Malayalam	Mazhavil Manorama		
