= Kunya Rajachi Ga Tu Rani =

2023 Indian Marathi-language TV series

- Genre: Drama
- Developed by: Leena Gangopadhyay
- Directed by: Girish Vasaikar
- Starring: See below
- Theme music composer: A. V. Prafullachandra
- Opening theme: "Kunya Rajachi Ga Tu Rani" by Vaishali Made
- Composer: Vaibhav Deshmukh
- Country of origin: India
- Original language: Marathi
- No. of episodes: 216

Production
- Producer: Smruti Shinde
- Camera setup: Multi-camera
- Running time: 22 minutes
- Production company: Sobo Films

Original release
- Network: Star Pravah
- Release: 18 July 2023 – 16 March 2024

Related
- Ishti Kutum

Kunya Rajachi Ga Tu Rani (transl. Which King's Queen Are You?) is an Indian Marathi language TV series which premiered from 18 July 2023 aired on Star Pravah. It starred Harshad Atkari and Sharvari Jog in lead roles. It is produced by Smruti Shinde under the banner of Sobo Films. It is an official remake of Bengali TV series Ishti Kutum.

== Plot ==
The story unfolds around Gunja, a love-child born in the tribal enclave in rural Maharashtra. Raised by her mother Babhali and stepfather, a tribal activist and leader, Gunja's life takes an unexpected turn when a renowned journalist, Kabir, visits their village to interview her stepfather. Amidst a stormy night, circumstances compel Gunja to spend the night in Kabir's room at the Tourist Lodge.

Despite their innocence, local customs lead to pressure on Kabir to marry Gunja. However, Kabir, already engaged to his girlfriend Mrunmayee in the city, refuses to acknowledge the ceremony. Instead, he leaves the decision to Gunja regarding their future. Choosing to accompany Kabir to the city, Gunja takes on the role of a maidservant. As she begins her studies in the city, Gunja gradually finds comfort and happiness in her new surroundings, endearing herself to Kabir's family, who come to appreciate her joyful disposition.

== Cast ==
=== Main ===
- Harshad Atkari as Kabir Sarpotdar
- Sharvari Jog as Gunja Kabir Sarpotdar
- Purneima Dey as Mrunmayee Kabir Sarpotdar

=== Recurring ===
- Samidha Guru as Babhali Dongre
- Vrunda Ahire as Madhushree Sarpotdar
- Vanashri Pande as Maya
- Vasudha Deshpande / Savita Malpekar as Kadu Aaji
- Priyanka Nar as Reshim Sarpotdar
- Neeta Pendse as Vijaya Sarpotdar
- Rashmi Joshi as Kavita Sarpotdar
- Amogh Chandan as Subodh Sarpotdar
- Tanishka Mhadse as Nitya Sarpotdar
- Oren Patil as Naitik Sarpotdar
- Rajan Bhise as Sarveshwar
- Sanjay Khapare as Satyajeet
- Vaibhav Rajendra as Budha
- Jaypal More as Sarpanch
- Swapnil Kale as Ranjit Deshmukh

== Adaptations ==
| Language | Title | Original release | Network(s) | Last aired | Notes |
|---|---|---|---|---|---|
| Bengali | Ishti Kutum ইষ্টি কুটুম | 24 October 2011 | Star Jalsha | 13 December 2015 | Original |
| Hindi | Mohi – Ek Khwab Ke Khilne Ki Kahani मोही – एक ख्बाव की खिलनेकी कहानी | 10 August 2015 | StarPlus | 27 February 2016 | Remake |
| Malayalam | Neelakkuyil നീലക്കുയിൽ | 26 February 2018 | Asianet | 6 April 2020 | Remake |
| Tamil | Neelakuyil நீல குயீல் | 17 December 2018 | Star Vijay | 24 August 2019 | Remake |
| Hindi | Imlie इमली | 16 November 2020 | StarPlus | 12 May 2024 | Remake |
| Telugu | Malli Nindu Jabili మల్లి నిండు జాబిలి | 28 February 2022 | Star Maa | 31 March 2026 | Remake |
| Marathi | Kunya Rajachi Ga Tu Rani कुन्या राजाची गं तू राणी | 18 July 2023 | Star Pravah | 16 March 2024 | Remake |
