= Neelakuyil (TV series) =

Indian Malayalam TV series

- Genre: Soap opera
- Created by: Thanuja
- Based on: Ishti Kutum
- Developed by: Leena Gangopadhyay
- Written by: Pradeep Milroy Peter
- Screenplay by: S. Ashok Kumar
- Directed by: Biju Varghese; C.J Baskar
- Starring: Sathya SK; Chandana Shetty; Snisha Chandran
- Theme music composer: Rajiv Atthul
- Country of origin: India
- Original language: Tamil
- No. of episodes: 211

Production
- Producer: Thakkolam Thanikasalam
- Cinematography: Ramesh Kumar
- Editor: E.Danasekaran
- Camera setup: Multi-camera
- Running time: 22 minutes
- Production company: Ross Petals Entertainment

Original release
- Network: Star Vijay
- Release: 17 December 2018 – 24 August 2019

Related
- Ishti Kutum

Neelakuyil (transl. The Blue Cuckoo) is a 2018 Indian Tamil language drama television series starring Sathya SK, Chandana Shetty, and Snisha Chandran. It aired on Star Vijay from 17 December 2018 till 24 August 2019 for 211 episodes. The Show was produced by Ross Petals Entertainment. The series is an official remake of Bengali TV series Ishti Kutum.

== Synopsis ==
Chittu (Snisha Chandran), a simple tribal love-girl is cogently married to Jaisurya (Sathya), a young and intelligent journalist from the city. Surya has decided to marry Rani (Chandana Shetty) after a seven-year love affair. But the events that happen in forest just before their wedding engagement change everything. Surya is forced to marry Chittu, a tribal woman, when the villagers find them together in a hut on his visit to Poombarai forest. Unable to tell the truth, he brings Chittu home as a servant to help his ailing mother. However, secrets reveal that Rani and Chittu are half-sisters later on as story progress. The show ends with Rani sacrificing her love for Chittu's life, reuniting with Jaisurya.

== Cast ==
=== Main ===
- Sathya SK as Jaisurya (Surya)
- Chandana Shetty as Rani: Surya's wife
- Snisha Chandran as Chittu: Rani's sister

People around Surya

- Sabitha Nair as Kalyani: Surya's mother
- Sathish as 'Captain': Surya's uncle
- Bhagyalakshmi as Chandramathi: Surya's auntie
- Gracy as Swathi: Surya's cousin
- Vasanth Gopinath as Saravanan
- Karishma Srinivasan as Jayanthi

People around Rani

- Rekha Ratheesh as Radhamani: Rani's mother
- V.R. Thilagam as Sathyavathi: Sharath Chandran's mother

People around Chittu (Tribals)

- Ruthu as Deivanai: Chittu's mother
- P. R. Varalakshmi as Deivanai's mother
- Vaani as Sarojini: Surya's housekeeper

== Adaptations ==
| Language | Title | Original release | Network(s) | Last aired | Notes |
|---|---|---|---|---|---|
| Bengali | Ishti Kutum ইষ্টি কুটুম | 24 October 2011 | Star Jalsha | 13 December 2015 | Original |
| Hindi | Mohi – Ek Khwab Ke Khilne Ki Kahani मोही – एक ख्बाव की खिलनेकी कहानी | 10 August 2015 | StarPlus | 27 February 2016 | Remake |
| Malayalam | Neelakkuyil നീലക്കുയിൽ | 26 February 2018 | Asianet | 6 April 2020 | Remake |
| Tamil | Neelakuyil நீல குயீல் | 17 December 2018 | Star Vijay | 24 August 2019 | Remake |
| Hindi | Imlie इमली | 16 November 2020 | StarPlus | 12 May 2024 | Remake |
| Telugu | Malli Nindu Jabili మల్లి నిండు జాబిలి | 28 February 2022 | Star Maa | 27 June 2026 | Remake |
| Marathi | Kunya Rajachi Ga Tu Rani कुन्या राजाची गं तू राणी | 18 July 2023 | Star Pravah | 16 March 2024 | Remake |
