= Neelakkuyil (TV series) =

TV series

- Genre: Drama; Soap opera
- Based on: Ishti Kutum
- Developed by: Leena Gangopadhyay
- Written by: Pradeep Kumar Kavumthara
- Directed by: Biju Varghese; Manju Dharman
- Starring: Nithin Jake Joseph; Pavani Reddy; Latha Sangharaju; Snisha Chandran
- Country of origin: India
- Original language: Malayalam
- No. of episodes: 633

Production
- Executive producers: Renjith. M, Dr. S. Vinod
- Producer: G. Jayakumar
- Cinematography: Manoj Kumar
- Editors: Rajesh Thrissur, Ajith Dev
- Camera setup: Multi-camera
- Running time: 22 minutes
- Production company: Ross Petals Productions Ltd.

Original release
- Network: Asianet
- Release: 26 February 2018 – 3 April 2020

Related
- Ishti Kutum

Neelakkuyil (transl. Cuckoo) is an Indian Malayalam-language television soap opera drama directed by Biju Varghese. The show premiered on Asianet channel and streaming on Disney+ Hotstar on 26 February 2018. It is the remake of Star Plus's Mohi.

This serial was remade in Tamil under the name Neelakuyil which aired on Star Vijay. Neelakuyil is the love story of Adhi and Rani. On the other side, Kasthoori is another girl who is suffering with poverty who accidentally enters into their lives. Nithin Jake Joseph, Latha Sangaraju and Snisha Chandran play the lead roles. Telugu actress Latha replaced Pavani Reddy, making her debut in Malayalam television.

== Plot ==
The story revolves around the life of a tribal love-child Kasthuri from a secluded region called Poompara in rural Kerala. Kasthuri is brought up by her mother Cheeru and stepfather Massy who is also a tribal activist and leader.

A famous journalist, Aditya, visits Poompara to interview Massy. One stormy night Kasthuri is forced to spend the night in the Tourist Lodge in Aditya's room. Though both are innocent, the locals force Aditya to marry Kasthuri. Aditya, previously engaged to his girlfriend Rani in the city, refuses to recognise the ceremony and asks Kasthuri to decide what she wants to do. Kasthuri then comes to Kerala with Aditya as a maidservant. She begins to study in the city. Gradually, she becomes comfortable and happy in the city, living with the Aditya's family, who also begin to love her cheerful ways.

Initially, Aditya thinks of Kasthuri as a nuisance. He continues his engagement to Rani, a college professor, whose father Sharatchandra "Chandru", also happens to be Kasthuri's biological father. Aditya slowly falls in love with Kasthuri, realising he considers Rani merely a close friend. An unhappy Rani tries to commit suicide but eventually divorces Aditya and arranges for his wedding to Kasthuri. However, the plans are foiled.

Kasthuri continues her studies and performs brilliantly. Rani's mother, Radhamani attempts to murder Kasthuri out of rage, aware of the fact that her husband is Kasthuri's father. Rani forces Chandru to accept Kasthuri as his daughter. Chandru regrets his past behavior and tries to build a relationship with Kasthuri.

Sharan, a lawyer, falls in love with Rani. Rani takes his help in getting bail for Massy. Finding a good friend in Sharan. But Rani doesn't have an idea about Sharan's thought, because she still madly loves Adhitya. However, the alliance is broken.

Rani becomes disheartened. Aditya narrates his story of how Kasthuri's villagers forced him to marry. Rani dismisses him at first, however, she realises that she shouldn't have been too harsh with Aditya. She accepts Kasthuri as her own sister and happily marries Aditya. Radhamani too realise her mistake. The series ends with a happy note as Aditya and Rani's family plans to get Kasthuri married to a good person.

== Cast ==
=== Main ===
- Nithin Jake Joseph as Journolist Adhithyan (Adhi): Rani's husband, Kasthoori's brother in law and ex-husband.
- Pavani Reddy / Latha Sangaraju as Rani Adhithyan: Adhi's wife and Kasthoori's sister
- Snisha Chandran as Dr. Kasthoori: Adhi's sister in law and ex-wife, Rani's sister

=== Recurring ===
- Anil Mohan as Arst. Sharath Chandran, Sharath: Rani's and Kasthoori's father
- Rashmi Hariprasad as Radhamani Sharath Chandran: Rani's mother
- KPAC Saji as Balanandhan, Balan: Adhi's father
- M. R. Gopakumar as Retired Captain Chandrasenan, Valyachan: Adhi's uncle
- Sabitha Nair as Vasandhi: Adhi's mother
- Raji.P.Menon as Chandramathi, Valyamma: Adhi's aunt
- Meenakshi Nair/Caroline Ancy as Swathi: Adhi's cousin
- Prabha Shankar as Dr Raveendran, Ravi: Adhi's uncle
- Bindu Krishna as Malini: Adhi's aunt
- Sangeetha Sivan as Shari: Rani's and Kasthoori's aunt
- Anandavally/ Geetha Nair as Muthassi: Rani's and Kasthoori's grandmother
- Hari as Adv.Saran: Shari's relative and Rani's friend
- Amal Rajdev as Maasi
- Ruthu as Cheeru: Kasthoori's mother

== Adaptations ==
Language	Title	Original release	Network(s)	Last aired	Notes
Bengali	Ishti Kutum ইষ্টি কুটুম	24 October 2011	Star Jalsha	13 December 2015	Original
Hindi	Mohi – Ek Khwab Ke Khilne Ki Kahani मोही – एक ख्बाव की खिलनेकी कहानी	10 August 2015	StarPlus	27 February 2016	Remake
Malayalam	Neelakkuyil നീലക്കുയിൽ	26 February 2018	Asianet	6 April 2020	Remake
Tamil	Neelakuyil நீல குயீல்	17 December 2018	Star Vijay	24 August 2019	Remake
Hindi	Imlie इमली	16 November 2020	StarPlus	12 May 2024	Remake
Telugu	Malli Nindu Jabili మల్లి నిండు జాబిలి	28 February 2022	Star Maa	31 March 2026	Remake
Marathi	Kunya Rajachi Ga Tu Rani कुन्या राजाची गं तू राणी	18 July 2023	Star Pravah	16 March 2024	Remake
