= Mohi – Ek Khwab Ke Khilne Ki Kahani =

Indian Hindi television series

- Genre: Drama
- Created by: Anuradha Sarin
- Based on: Ishti Kutum
- Developed by: Leena Gangopadhyay
- Written by: Robin Bhatt
- Directed by: Manesh Om Singhania
- Starring: Vinita Joshi Thakkar; Karan Sharma; Rishima Roshlani
- Country of origin: India
- Original language: Hindi
- No. of episodes: 210

Production
- Producers: Anuradha Sarin; R. Satish Kumar
- Production locations: Pune; Mumbai
- Editor: Masih Habib
- Camera setup: Multi-camera
- Running time: 22 minutes
- Production company: White Horse Productions

Original release
- Network: Star Plus
- Release: 10 August 2015 – 27 February 2016

Related
- Ishti Kutum

Mohi – Ek Khwab Ke Khilne Ki Kahani is an Indian television series which premiered from 10 August 2015 on Star Plus. The series is the Hindi remake of Star Jalsha's series Ishti Kutum. The show stars Vinita Joshi and Karan Sharma. The show went off air on 27 February 2016.

== Plot ==
The story of the show is about a young tribal girl named Mohi. Ayush is forced to marry Mohi during his visit to her remote village. After, life takes a sharp turn for Mohi when she comes to the big city. Ayush introduces her as the maidservant to the family as his family, unaware of his wedding to Mohi, continue planning his wedding with his girlfriend.

== Cast ==
- Vinita Joshi as Mohi
- Karan Sharma as Ayush Madhur Gokhle
- Rishma Roshlani as Anusha Gokhle
- Shishir Sharma as Vinay Dixit
- Gauri Tonk as Rekha Dixit
- Shailesh Dattar as Manohar Gokhle
- Shubhangi Latkar as Sushila Manohar Gokhle
- Nivedita Bhattacharya as Mahua
- Nakul Tiwadi as Kapil

== Reception ==
4 Lions Films producer Gul Khan remade the series again as Imlie in 2020 for StarPlus stating, "I know you have heard and seen this before, many times, but we’ll play it more real." While Mohi could not garner good viewership, Imlie airing in a prime slot 8:30 pm became one of the top viewed Hindi GEC.

== Adaptations ==
Language	Title	Original release	Network(s)	Last aired	Notes
Bengali	Ishti Kutum ইষ্টি কুটুম	24 October 2011	Star Jalsha	13 December 2015	Original
Hindi	Mohi – Ek Khwab Ke Khilne Ki Kahani मोही – एक ख्बाव की खिलनेकी कहानी	10 August 2015	StarPlus	27 February 2016	Remake
Malayalam	Neelakkuyil നീലക്കുയിൽ	26 February 2018	Asianet	6 April 2020	Remake
Tamil	Neelakuyil நீல குயீல்	17 December 2018	Star Vijay	24 August 2019	Remake
Hindi	Imlie इमली	16 November 2020	StarPlus	12 May 2024	Remake
Telugu	Malli Nindu Jabili మల్లి నిండు జాబిలి	28 February 2022	Star Maa	31 March 2026	Remake
Marathi	Kunya Rajachi Ga Tu Rani कुन्या राजाची गं तू राणी	18 July 2023	Star Pravah	16 March 2024	Remake
