= Snisha Chandran =

Indian television actress

- Born: 3 May 1998 (age 28); Manjeri, Kerala, India
- Occupation: Actress
- Years active: 2018–present
- Known for: Neelakkuyil (TV series)

Snisha Chandran is an Indian television actress who primarily works in Malayalam television.

== Career ==
Snisha made her television debut through the show Neelakkuyil in 2018. She played the lead role of Kasthoori, a tribal girl. The show ran successfully until 2020. She got Prem Nazir Award for Best Serial Actress for her performance in the series. She reprised her role in the show's Tamil remake Neelakuyil from 2018 to 2019.

From 2020 to 2022, Snisha played Karthika in Karthika Deepam opposite Vivek Gopan.

== In the media ==
She was ranked 9th among the Kochi Times Most Desirable Women on Television 2018 by The Times of India.

== Filmography ==
=== Television ===
List of Snisha Chandran television credits
Year	Title	Role	Channel	Notes
2018–2020	Neelakkuyil	Dr. Kasthoori	Asianet	
2018–2019	Neelakuyil	Chittu	Star Vijay	Tamil TV series
2020–2022	Karthika Deepam	Karthika	Zee Keralam	
2023	Sita Ramam	Seetha Lakshmi	Sun Surya	
2023- 2024	Subhadram	Subhadra/ Anjali	Zee Keralam	Dual role
2024	Kudumbashree Sharada	Anjali	Zee Keralam	Mahasangamam episodes
2024	Chandrikayilaliyunna Chandrakantham	Captain Akhila/ Abhirami	Asianet	
2024	Kodeeshwaran	Chandana	Pocket FM	
2024	Mangalyam	Subhadra	Zee Keralam	Guest appearance
2025	Veettile Vilakku	Vismaya	Flowers TV	
2025–2026	Kudumbashree Sharada	Reshma	Zee Keralam	
2026–present	Anju Sundarikal	Vridha	Sun Surya	Replaced Diya Chity
