= M. R. Gopakumar =

Indian film, television and theatre artist

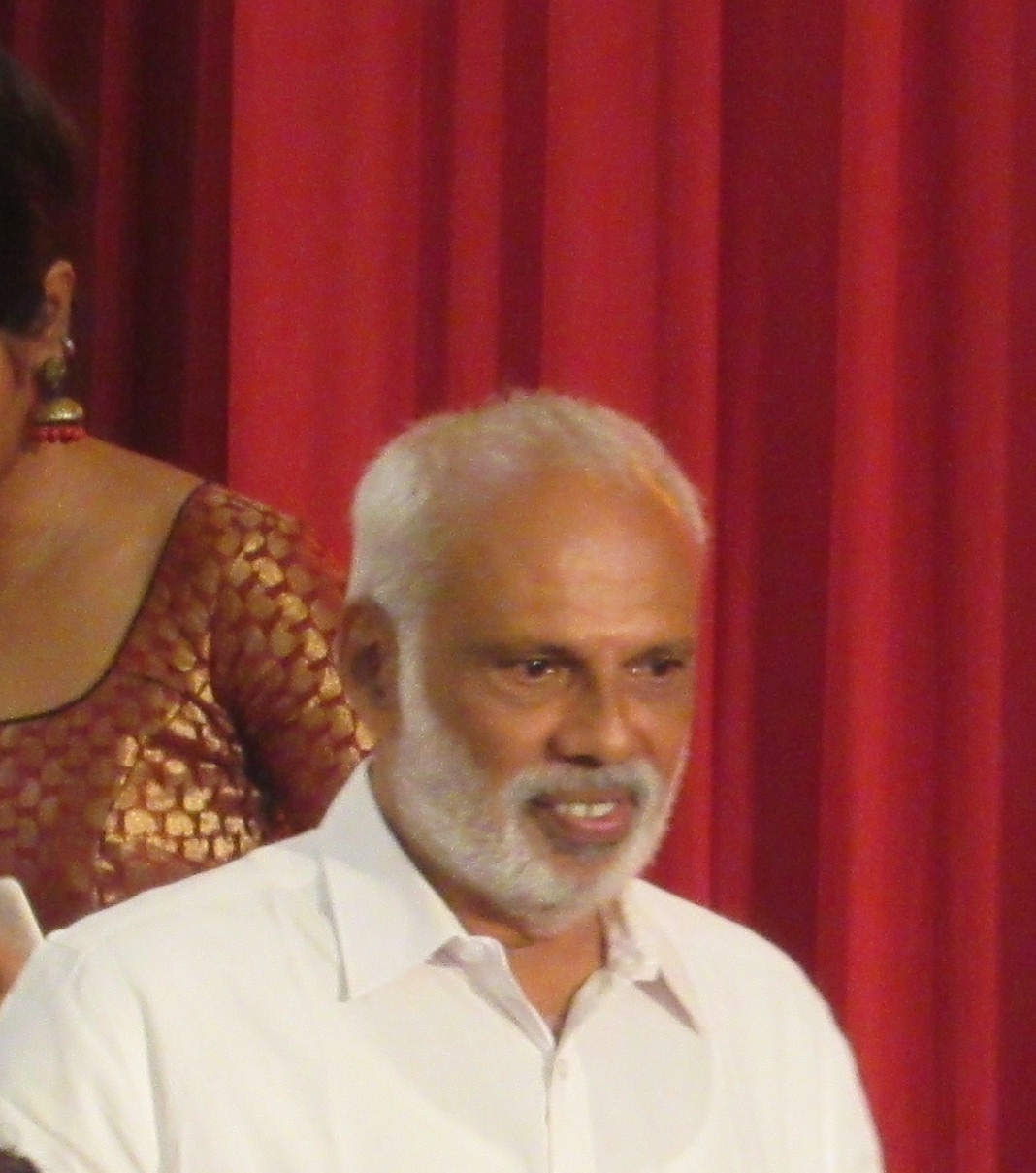
- Born: Mathar Ramakrishnan Gopakumar; 12 August 1951 (age 75); Thiruvattar, Travancore Cochin now Kanyakumari district, Tamil Nadu, India
- Occupations: Actor; Government employee
- Years active: 1974–present

Mathar Ramakrishnan Gopakumar (born 12 August 1951) is an Indian film, television and theatre artist from Kerala. He began his acting career through Malayalam stage plays and later in tele-films and television serials and into films. In his career spanning over four decades, Gopakumar has acted in a wide variety of roles and has worked in both art house and mainstream films. He is mainly noted for his role as Thommi in the 1994 movie Vidheyan.

He has won two Kerala State Film Awards and five Kerala State Television Awards for acting.

== Early life ==
M. R. Gopakumar was born on 12 August 1951 in Thiruvattar, then in Travancore Cochin, now in Kanyakumari district of Tamil Nadu. Gopakumar did his primary school education in Thiruvattar Lower Primary School and completed his high school education from Thiruvattar High School. His did his pre-university course at Christian College, Marthandam and joined Pioneer Kumaraswamy College, Nagercoil and graduated with a Bachelor of Commerce degree. He later joined for post-graduation Master of Commerce at Mar Ivanios College, Thiruvananthapuram. He migrated to Thiruvananthapuram when he joined Mar Ivanios college.

After earning his master's degree, Gopakumar joined Indian government service in 1973 as an auditor with P&T Audit under Comptroller and Auditor General of India. Post bifurcation of this department, Gopakumar moved into the Postal Accounts Department under Government of India. He retired from Postal Accounts as an Assistant Accounts Officer in September 2011.

== Career ==
=== Stage plays ===
M. R. Gopakumar started his acting career as an amateur theatre actor in 1974 in G. Sankara Pillai's drama Rakshapurushan. The play was staged by the recreation club members of P&T Audit. This helped Gopakumar identify his passion for acting and he found himself being a part of five more plays staged by the club. Towards the late 1970s, a few young aspiring artists in Thiruvananthapuram came together to form an amateur drama troupe named Natyagruham. Gopakumar was one of the founding members of Natyagruham. The troupe that was headed by Narendra Prasad soon became very popular in Thiruvananthapuram. The association with like-minded artists in Natyagruham helped Gopakumar polish his acting skills. During the next 15 years with the troupe, he associated himself with several stage plays that won the accolades of many art-lovers across Kerala.

=== Television ===
In 1986, Doordarshan started telecasting tele-films in Malayalam-language under their own production. Kunjayyappan was one of the first Malayalam tele-films produced and telecasted by Doordarshan. Gopakumar played the title role. In 1988, Doordarshan aired a 13-episode television serial Mandan Kunchu. Gopakumar played an important role alongside Nedumudi Venu and Kaviyoor Ponnamma. Gopakumar's professional acting career took off from there. Since then, he has acted in around 100 serials and tele-films.

=== Feature films ===
Gopakumar's first feature film appearance was in the 1989 movie Mathilukal directed by Adoor Gopalakrishnan. The film was an adaptation of Vaikom Muhammad Basheer's novel of the same name. Gopakumar played the role of a random prison inmate who explains the story of a hole on the prison wall to his fellow inmate, the lead character, Basheer. His role in Mathilukal was not significant enough to be noticed by many.

Although, Gopakumar's acting prowess did not go unnoticed by Adoor Gopalakrishnan when he happened to watch a stage play that Gopakumar took part in. Adoor Gopalakrishnan called Gopakumar again in 1993, this time to play the title role in Vidheyan, an adaptation of the novel Bhaskara Pattelarum Ente Jeevithavum by Paul Zacharia. This turned out to be the big break that Gopakumar was looking for in his career. His performance in Vidheyan earned him a Kerala State Film Award – Special Jury Award.

In 1999, he won Kerala State Film Award for Second Best Actor for his role in Gopalan Nairude Thaadi.

== In the media ==
In 1996, when Hollywood director Steven Spielberg was looking for an Indian actor to play a role in The Lost World: Jurassic Park, his casting agents in India were directed towards M. R. Gopakumar by Adoor Gopalakrishnan himself. After multiple rounds of discussions and reviews of acting clips, Gopakumar was selected to play the role of the Indian character. The news attracted national attention almost immediately, as Gopakumar was set to become the first Indian actor to act in a Steven Spielberg film. However, Gopakumar was unable to join the production unit in Los Angeles as his work permit could not be processed within time. The role in the movie was later played by a foreign actor.

== Filmography ==
Gopakumar has acted in more than 50 feature films and around 100 tele-films and television serials. He is still active in both professional and amateur plays.

=== Films ===
Year	Title	Role	Notes
1990	Mathilukal	Prisoner	
1992	Aardram	Musliar	
1993	Naaraayam	Damodharan Namboothiri	
1994	Galileo		
1994	Vidheyan	Thommi	
1996	Oru Neenda Yathra		
1997	Kalyana Kacheri		
1997	Bhoothakkannadi	Balakrishnan	
1997	Snehadoothu		
1998	Manthrikumaran	Ravunni	
1999	Gopalan Nairude Thaadi		
1999	Gaandhiyan		
1999	Devadasi	Krishnan	
2000	Neelathadaakatthile Nizhalppakshikal		
2000	Susanna		
2000	Thottam		
2000	Mazhanoolkkanavu		
2001	Mookkuthi		
2001	Neythukaran	Bahuleyan	
2001	Jeevan Masai		
2001	The Gift of God		
2002	Bheri		
2003	Mazhanoolkkanavu		
2003	Paadam Onnu: Oru Vilapam	Abdu	
2005	Udayon	Chackochi	
2005	Nerariyan CBI	Mythili's father	
2006	Nottam	Nambeeshan	
2006	Out of Syllabus		
2006	Mahasamudram	Unni Pillai	
2006	Ammathottil		
2006	Shyaamam		
2007	Irmiah		
2007	Naalu Pennungal	Kumari's father	Segment: Kanyaka
2008	Vilapangalkkappuram	Zahira's father	
2008	Malabar Wedding		
2008	Madampi	Kottilakathu Raghavan	
2008	De Ingottu Nokkiye		
2008	Oru Pennum Randaanum	Neelantan	Segment: Kallante Makan
2009	Thathwamasi		
2010	The Thriller	Adv. Uthaman Pillai	
2010	Punyam Aham	Pappanassar	
2011	Priyappetta Nattukare	Sakhavu Appu	
2011	Ee Dhanya Muhoortham		
2011	Adaminte Makan Abu	Sulaiman	
2012	Puthiya Theerangal		
2012	The Last Vision		
2012	Karmayogi		
2012	Ozhimuri	Thanu Pillai's uncle	
2012	White Paper		
2013	My Fan Ramu		
2013	Manikkya Thamburattiyum Christmas Karolum		
2013	Pigman	Madhavan	
2013	Chewing Gum		
2014	Chayilyam		
2015	Nirnayakam		
2015	Kaattum Mazhayum		IFFK release
2016	Pulimurugan	Kadutha	
2017	Kuppivala		
2021	Kurup	Charlie's father	Special appearance
2023	Dharani		
2023	Vaasam	Appooppan	
2026	Christina		

== Television ==
Year	Title	Channel	Notes
2025–present	Athira	Surya TV	
2024–present	Super Kanmani	Mazhavil Manorama	
2023	Seetharamam	Surya TV	
2023-2024	mazhayethum munpe	Amrita tv	
2022	Ullathai Allitha	Colors Tamil	Tamil Serial
2021	Manam Pole Mangalyam	Zee Keralam	
2020–2022	Ente Maathavu	Surya TV	
2019-2020	Thamarathumbi	Surya TV	
2018	Athmasakhi	Mazhavil Manorama	
2018–2020	Neelakkuyil	Asianet	
2017	Mamangam	Flowers TV	
2016	Manjurukum Kalam	Mazhavil Manorama	
2015	Bandhuvaru Shathruvaru	Mazhavil Manorama	
2015	Sulu Nivas	Janam TV	
2014	Bhagyalakshmi	Surya TV	
2014	Mohakkadal	Surya TV	
2013	Sparsham	Media One	
2013-2014	Amala	Mazhavil Manorama	
2013	Sandhyaragam	Amrita TV	
2012	Amma	Asianet	
2011-2012	Ilam Thennal Pole	Surya TV	
2010	Mattoruval	Surya TV	
2010	Lipstick	Asianet	
2009	Sreemahabhagavatham	Asianet	
2009	Mangalya Pattu	Kairali TV	
	Anantham	DD	
2008	Aranazhika neram	Amrita TV	
2007	Kalyani	Surya TV	
2006	Kaavyanjali	Surya TV	
2006	Kanalppoovu	Kairali TV	
2003	Swantham	Asianet	
	Punnaykka Vikasana Corporation	DD Malayalam	
2002	Sadasivante Kumbasaram	DD Malayalam	
2002	Jwaalayaay	DD Malayalam	
1999	Pulari	DD Malayalam	
1999	Balyakal Smaranakal	DD Malayalam	
	Manikyan	DD Malayalam	
	Alakal	DD Malayalam	
	Snehathinte Mullukal	DD Malayalam	
	Chandrodayam	DD Malayalam	
1998	Thamarakuzhali	DD Malayalam	
1998	Pattolaponnu	DD Malayalam	
1994	Koodaram	DD Malayalam	
1988	Mandan Kunju	DD Malayalam	
1986	Kunjayyappan	DD Malayalam	

== Awards ==
Kerala State Film Awards

- 1993: Special Jury Award for Acting – Vidheyan
- 1999: Second Best Actor – Gopalan Nairude Thaadi

Kerala State Television Awards

- 1994: Best Actor – Koodaaram
- 1998: Best Actor – Pattolapponnu
- 1999: Best Actor – Pulari, Baalyakaala Smaranakal
- 2004: Best Supporting Actor – Fiction
- 2008: Second Best Actor – Aranaazhika Neram

Asianet Television Awards

- 2019: Best actor in a character role - Neelakkuyil (TV series)
