= Ishti Kutum =

Bengali TV serial

- Promotional poster
- Genre: Drama; Romance; Family; Comedy
- Created by: Leena Gangopadhyay
- Developed by: Leena Gangopadhyay
- Written by: Leena Gangopadhyay
- Directed by: Saibal Banerjee; Diganta Sinha
- Creative director: Leena Gangopadhyay
- Presented by: Bright Advertising Pvt. Ltd.
- Starring: Raneeta Das; Rishi Kaushik; Ankita Chakraborty; Sudipta Chakraborty
- Opening theme: Ishti Kutum Ishti Kutum Ishti Kutum
- Country of origin: India
- Original language: Bengali
- No. of episodes: 1332

Production
- Executive producers: Sumit Kumar Roy, Satyajit Chakraborty (Magic Moments), Kastuvi Ghosh (Star Jalsha), Sriya Basu (Star Jalsha)
- Producer: Saibal Banerjee
- Production location: West Bengal
- Cinematography: Paramatma Yadav
- Editors: Sameer; Soumen
- Camera setup: Multi-camera
- Running time: 22 minutes
- Production company: Magic Moments Motion Pictures

Original release
- Network: Star Jalsha
- Release: 24 October 2011 – 13 December 2015

Ishti Kutum is a Bengali television series that premiered from 24 October 2011 to 13 December 2015 aired on Star Jalsha. The show was produced by Magic Moments Motion Pictures company. It was the first show produced by Magic Moments Motion Pictures as well as one of the longest running Bengali television soap opera. The series starred Raneeta Das (later replaced by Sudipta Chakraborty), Rishi Kaushik and Ankita Chakraborty in lead roles.

In August 2014, Raneeta Das had to resign from the show for medical reasons and her studies. A legal issue also happened with Star Jalsha when she discontinued Ishti Kutum. In December 2014, Sudipta Chakraborty joined the serial as Baha.

== Plot ==
The story revolves around the life of an 18 year old Munda tribal love-child Bahamoni Soren from a secluded region called Palashboni in rural West Bengal and her wish to marry a Bengali speaking high caste person from Mukherjee clan. Bahamoni (Baha), who had just completed her 11th standard aged 18 wants to study further, is brought up by her mother Konkamoni (Konka) and Mama(Uncle) Satyakam who is also a tribal activist and leader. Baha and her mother Konka had to face a lot of humiliation from her grandmother, who always yelled at her and Konka.

They were insisted to make 500 baskets out of which 310 was made for the fair. Konka and Dibyo recalled their past when Dibyo came to Polashboni 18 years ago and had an affair with Konkamoni. Dibyo eventually leaves Konka as Dibyo was already married to Anushree with a 7-year-old daughter Kamalika/Mun. Rupanjana returns back to her natal home after an argument with her in-laws and was in a trauma after her marriage, as a result she had to return and was unable to adjust with her family.

A famous journalist from the city of Kolkata, Archisman Mukherjee, visits Palashboni to interview Satyakam. Baha and Archi cross paths when Baha carries food for Satyakam and when the food falls down. Archi and Baha become close. One stormy night Baha was forced to spend the night in the Tourist Lodge in Archi's room. The next morning, the villagers decided to kill Archi, but Baha stopped it. Archi was in a difficult situation and to save his life, he was forced to marry Baha.

Archi was having a tough time, thinking that what face he will go to his family. On that day, Baha knew Archi has a fiancée in the city so she promises Archi that she will never talk about this forced ritual. Baha goes to a washroom and removes all the signs of her fake marriage so that nobody knows it. Archi, who has a seven-year-long love relationship with Kamalika, refuses to recognize the ceremony and asks Baha to decide what she wants to do. Baha then comes to Kolkata with Archi as a maidservant, but the family members treat her as the daughter of that house. Archi always had anger for Baha. She commits blunders all the time. One day the family went out shopping and told her that dacoits are there in the city and takes it seriously. That day Dibyo arrives with sweets and Baha thought him as a dacoit and dragged him out and feeling bored, had sleeping pills and was in a deep sleep when the family arrived. The Mukherjees receive a phone call from Dibyo about Baha. The Mukherjees learn of Baha's qualification and she starts studying there.

On the day of Kamalika's ceremony, Baha searches for her father on knowing that her father stays in Ballygunge. She gets lost in the city and knows Archi's office name 'Pratham Khabar' and goes there with the police and Archi loses his reputation there.

Archi marries Kamalika legally with ceremony and registration in the city as Baha also witnesses the same. One day, Kamalika goes for excursion with her students and gets stuck in an earthquake and family gets tensed. Baha always made blunders. One day she went to the shop to buy spices and the shopkeeper says her that she would be getting them after his lunch, despite Baha saying that she has no time. Baha steals the spices and goes home. Dibyo visits the Mukherjees and Baha prepares tea with ginger, garlic, milk, onion, spices and tea leaves which turns out a different colour and food. She serves the members and they get shocked on seeing the tea served by Baha. One day, Baha goes to the bus stand to take Sondesh from his bus after his dispersal from school. Baha argues with the Rickshawala and steals the Rickshaw and brings Sondesh home. The Rickshawala is angry on Baha and wants fine for her blunder and the Mukherjees are fed up of Baha's immature behaviour.

Baha comes home one day with fruits and few local boys play cricket and Baha insists them to give some space for her to go home. One of the boys throw Baha's fruits and in anger, she breaks their wicket and runs and the boys follow her towards the Mukherjee house. She was scolded by the Mukherjees as usual. Baha's birthday was celebrated by the Mukherjees and she was missing Konkamoni and Ashapurna gifts her one of her oldest necklace to Baha. Seeing Baha's closeness with his family and especially Kamalika and feeling guity Archi asks Baha to leave. Baha sees Archi's bike lying on the road and grows made her suspicious and informs the police. Police save Archie and Baba leaves for Palashbani without informing the family. Archi and the Mukherjees get worried for Baha but she calles Hiranmoy and tells his she if save and in her village. Growing anxious without Baha, Archi goes to Palashbani to meet her, there he gets bitten by a snake and again Baha saves him by rushing him to the doctor on time. Meanwhile, Kamalika grows restless having not been able to contact Archi and decides to go to her mother's house for a few days. Dibyojyoti visits Palashboni and Archi overhears his conversation with Konkamoni and finds out Baha is Dibyojyoti's daughter and Kamalika's half sister. Seeing an unknown number on Archi's phone and sensing his distant and weird behavior, Kamalika decides to call that number and Prakash answers the phone. Kamalika introduces herself as Archi's wife on the phone. Baha admits to Prakash that Archi remarried but asks him to keep this a secret. Baha goes to Kolkata with Prakash and intends to stay in a ladies hostel. While crossing the road, Hiranmoy spots her and asks her to come to the Mukherjee home, but she refuses and says she will stay at the hostel. Archi gets to know this and goes and meets Baha and asks how could she refuse Hiranmoy like this who treated her as his daughter. Archi then convinces Baha to return home. He tries to get close to her, but she tries her best to maintain distance.

Baha and Mithai anxious wait for their exam results. Meanwhile, Hiranmoy and Baha cook Biryani and Baha makes it so spicy that no one could eat it later. Mithai scores 62% with 1st division and Baha scores 89% in her Higher Secondary exams and makes her known ones proud. She goes to Palashbani to collect her result and her news is published in newspaper and shown on TV. Archi and Baha become closer, leading Kamalika doubtful. Baha goes to her college but she gets trolled by her classmates and college mates because of her dressup and behaviour. Kamalika rubs off the vermillion from Baha's forehead but she goes and buys vermillion and fights with a boy of her college who called her bull. Kamalika thinks luckily Baha was not there in her college otherwise she would have lost her job and prestige. Kamalika lashes out at Baha for her uncommon behaviour and dressing.

She finds vermillion in her bag and throws it out in anger. Archi and Kamalika plan of staying away for a few days and Baha blames herself for everything. Baha goes to her college where she had a flower in her hand and was proposing her professor with the flower saying that he loved flowers, leaving everything laughed. The Mukherjees and the Majumdars go out for Baha's award ceremony for her brilliant result and she shares a speech that left everyone speechless and emotional.

After 8 months of their marriage Archi started cheating on Kamalika with Baha. After knowing Baha is the secret love-child of Dibyo and Kanka, and she is also his wife Kamalika's half sister, Archi suddenly started feeling bad for Baha and wanted to have her close to him now. Baha who always wanted to be recognized by Archi secretly took this opportunity and started visiting Kamalika-Archi's bedroom when Kamalika was not present. Gradually Archi starts misbehaving with Kamalika, making her life sad and miserable. Baha secretly used to see this but went on as a secret affair inside Archi's house. An unhappy Kamalika tries to commit suicide when she realized she has been cheated by her husband and 8 year long trusting man. With such drastic step Kamalika's mother decides to file a case against Archi but Kamalika was still madly in love with him saves Archi's career, reputation, and jail-time by lying to everyone that she herself is not interested in this marriage. Kamalika eventually divorces Archi to free him from this marriage and arranges for his wedding to Baha even though Kamalika;s heart was broken everyday. Archi and Baha are married in the eyes of the law

In the meantime, Baha informs Debraj about Dhritiman's illness which he hid it from everyone that he had blood cancer and Debraj lashes out at Radharani for not growing up Dhritiman properly and Parna and Rupanjana see it as a shocker. Kamalika goes to Palashbani and gets to know that Dibyojyoti, her biological father is also Baha's biological father, leaving her shocked.

Baha participates in Dhunochi dance and dances with Dhunochi on her hand with some boys and Archi sees it and was warned by Rupanjana to not fall in trouble. After seeing it, Baha stops and goes home and Archi was angry on her and the family goes for Rupanjana's music programme and Baha doesn't. Dibyojyoti goes to Kamalika's college and gets to know everything and understands Kamalika lied everyone. Baha suffers from dengue and gets hospitalised. Kamalika forces her father Dibyojoyti to accept Baha as his daughter. Dibyojoti regrets his past behavior and tries to build a relationship with Baha.

Meanwhile, Archi's elder brother, Dhritiman, returns home and is suffering from leukemia. He breaks off his engagement with Sanjhbati, a singer, because of his illness. With Baha's help, Dhritiman and Sanjhbati resolve their differences and marry. Archi grows jealous of Baha's intimacy with Prakash, her friend and professor, but later realises she is innocent and becomes possessive of her. Dhrubo Sen, a lawyer, falls in love with Kamalika. Kamalika takes his help in getting bail for Satyakam. Finding a good friend in Dhrubo, Kamalika agrees to marry him. But Dhrubo's first wife Rusha, who had run away and was missing for many years, suddenly returns leaving Kamalika shocked. Baha and Archi try to fight for Rusha, unaware of her criminal connections. Baha gets arrested as she lies to police and take a packet of drugs. Archi and Baha again breaks Kamalika's marriage by bringing Rusha in their life. Rusha returns to Dhrubo and Kamalika leaves him becoming lonely. As a result, Dibyojyoti disowns Baha as his daughter.

Later on, Baha travels abroad for higher studies. Kamalika is pregnant with Dhruba's child but hides this from him. She meets Bikram who falls in love with her and wants to marry her. Meanwhile, Archi discovers that Bikram is his cousin brother. Kamalika finally decides to marry Bikram and gives birth to a son, Aasmaan. Rusha steals the baby who is rescued and returned to Kamalika by Bikram and Archi. After a long time, Baha returns in a new look.

Baha unintentionally causes Archi's sister Nilu to miscarry. Archi threatens to divorce Baha. Kamalika sees Baha and her colleague on the street and informs Archi suspecting Baha is having an affair. An angry Baha threatens Kamalika with filing a case if she interferes between her and Archi. Archi reminds her of Kamalika's sacrifices that Archi would have been in jail and Baha would have had no life if Kamalika did not show mercy on them while divorcing Archi. Archi started moving away from Baha because of her behaviour and considered her a nuisance. Kamalika is diagnosed with cancer. She goes to Palashboni and donates her money to build a hospital there. She dies in Archi's arms on her birthday and leaves her child in his care. Baha realizes no matter how much she tries Archi will never forget his first love Kamalika and leaves finally. Elsewhere, Mithai later marries Dibakar.

== Cast ==
=== Main ===
- Ranita Das / Sudipta Chakraborty as Bahamoni Soren (née Soren/Majumdar) a.k.a. Baha – Dibyojyoti and Konkamoni's daughter; Satyakam's adoptive daughter; Kamalika's half-sister (2011 – 2014)/(2014 – 2015)
- Rishi Kaushik as Archisman Mukherjee a.k.a. Archi – A journalist of Pratham Khabar; Pallab and Parnabai's son; Suranjana's brother; Kamalika's ex-husband; Baha's husband; Aasman's foster father. (2011–2015)
- Ankita Chakraborty as Prof. Kamalika Mukherjee (formerly Sen, née Majumdar) a.k.a. Mun/Muniya/Poymonti – An Economics professor of Kolkata Women's College; Dibyojyoti and Anushree's daughter; Baha's half-sister; Archi's 1st wife come lover (2011–2015)

=== Recurring ===
Mukherjee family

- Santu Mukherjee as Hiranmoy Mukherjee a.k.a. Hiru – Umasashi's first son, Radharani's husband; Dhritiman, Nilanjana and Rupanjana's father (2011 – 2015)
- Saswati Guha Thakurta as Radharani Mukherjee a.k.a. Rani – Hiranmoy's wife; Dhritiman, Nilanjana and Rupanjana's mother (2011 – 2015)
- Gautam De as Pallab Mukherjee a.k.a. Polu – Umasashi's second son; Parnabai's husband; Archisman and Suranjana's father. (2011 – 2015)
- Tanuka Chatterjee as Parnabai Mukherjee a.k.a. Parna – Pallab's wife; Archisman and Suranjana's mother (2011 – 2015)
- Arindam Sil as Debraj Mukherjee a.k.a. Debu – Umasashi's third son, Doyel's ex-husband; Chini and Sondesh's father (2011 – 2013)
- Manjusree Ganguly as Doyel Ghosh (formerly Mukherjee, née Pakhi) – Debu's ex-wife; Tamaljeet's wife; Chini and Sondesh's mother (2011 – 2015)
- Surojit Banerjee as Tamaljeet Ghosh – A scientist; Doyel's second husband; Chini and Sondesh's adoptive father (2013 – 2015)
- Badshah Moitra as Dhritiman Mukherjee a.k.a. Dhriti – Hiru and Rani's son; Nilu and Rupu's brother; Sanjhbati's husband (2012 – 2015)
- Bidipta Chakraborty as Sanjhbati Mukherjee – A singer; Dhriti's widow (2012 – 2015)
- Rupsha Guha as Nilanjana Banerjee (née Mukherjee) a.k.a. Nilu – Hiranmoy and Radharani's younger daughter; Rupanjana and Dhritiman's sister; Prabuddha's wife (2011 – 2015)
- Sandip Chakraborty as Prabuddha Banerjee – Nilanjana's husband (2011 – 2015)
- Sahana Sen as Rupanjana Chatterjee (née Mukherjee) a.k.a. Rupu – a singer, Hiranmoy and Radharani's elder daughter; Nilanjana and Dhritiman's sister; Arjo's wife (2011 – 2015)
- Suman Banerjee as Arjo Chatterjee – Rupanjana's husband (2013 – 2015)
- Aishi Bhattacharya / Abantika Biswas as Chinmoyee Ghosh a.k.a. Chini – Doyel and Debraj's daughter; Tamojit's adoptive daughter, Sondesh's sister (2011 – 2015)/(2015)
- Sonal Mishra as Suranjana Ghosh (formerly Hembram, née Mukherjee) a.k.a. Mithai – Pallab and Parnabai's daughter; Archisman's sister; Prakash's ex-wife; Dibakar's wife (2011 – 2015)
- Unknown as Sourojit Mukherjee a.k.a. Sondesh – Debraj and Doel's son; Tamaljeet's foster son, Chini's brother (2011 – 2014)

Majumdar family

- Madhabi Mukhopadhyay as Ashapurna Majumdar – Dibyojyoti and Jaya's mother; Kamalika and Baha's paternal grandmother; Dodul's maternal grandmother (2011 – 2015)
- Shankar Chakraborty as Dibyajyoti Majumdar a.k.a. Dibyo – An aspiring painter; Ashapurna's son; Jaya's brother; Anu's husband; Kamalika and Baha's father (2011 – 2015)
- Suchismita Chowdhury as Anushree Majumdar a.k.a. Anu – Dibyo's wife; Kamalika's mother and Baha's stepmother (2011 – 2015)
- Rajashree Bhowmick as Jaya – Ashapurna's daughter; Dibyo's sister, Sukanta's widow, Dodul's mother (2011 – 2015)

Hembram family

- Anushree Das as Konkamoni Hembram (née Soren) – Satyakam's wife; Baha's mother; Kamalika's stepmother; Prakash's adoptive mother (2011 – 2015)
- Chandan Sen as Satyakam Hembram – A tribal activist; Konkamoni's husband; Prakash's father; Baha's adoptive father (2011 – 2015)
- Sudip Sengupta as Prakash Hembram – Satyakam's son; Baha's former love interest; Mithai's ex-husband (2011 – 2015)
- Unknown as Baha's step-grandmother, Konkamoni's step-mother and Satyakam's aunt (2011 – 2015)

=== Others ===
- Bhaswar Chatterjee as Dhrubo Sen a.k.a. Piklu – A lawyer; Rusha's husband; Kamalika's ex-husband; Aasman's father (2012 – 2015)
- Koushik Roy as Bikramjit Mukherjee a.k.a. Bikram – Archisman and Suranjana's cousin; Kamalika's husband and true lover (2014 – 2015)
- Dipankar De as Babiya – Sanjhbati's uncle (2012)
- Anuradha Roy as Sanjhbati's mother (2012)
- Dola Chakraborty as Arjyo's mother (2013 – 2015)
- Kunal Padhi as Arjyo's father (2013)
- Dwaipayan Das as Dibakar Ghosh – Baha's office boss; Mithai's second husband (2015)
- Diganta Bagchi as Arghya; A lawyer; Dhrubo's senior and Dibyajyoti friend (2012 – 2013)
- Kousani Roy Sarkar as Rusha Sen a.k.a. (fake Angelina, Roseline, & Juni) – Dhrubo's first wife, a smuggler (2014–2015)
- Dr. Basudeb Mukherjee as Jyotishmaan Sen – Dhrubo's father
- Chaitali Dasgupta as Dhrubo's mother
- Kalyani Mondal as Dhrubo's aunt
- Sagarika Roy as Sokhimoni a.k.a. Sokhi – Baha's friend in Palashboni. (2011 – 2015)
- Moyna Mukherjee / Sujata Daw as Mishti – Arjo's cousin and Rupanjana's rival (2014 – 2015)
- Arup Roy as Monglu – Baha's friend (2012 – 2015)
- Prriyam Chakraborty as Monojaba / Dodul – Sukanta and Jaya's estranged daughter (2015)
- Rita Koyral as Kumudini a.k.a. Kumu (2014 – 2015)
- Pushpendu Roy as Krishanu – Archi's colleague and rival; Mithai's ex-lover (2011 – 2015)
- Surjya Kar as Anjan – head of Prothom Khabar (2011 – 2012)
- Satyam Majumder as a milkman (2012)
- Sourav Chatterjee as Arjun
- Sanchita Bhattacharya as Sreemoyee
- Sourav Chakraborty as Kallol a.k.a. (fake Pat), a smuggler, Rusha's boss
- Arghya Mukherjee as an Inspector
- Kamalika Banerjee as Sharmila – Dhritiman's ex-wife (2015)
- Suparna Patra as Baha's friend (2012 – 2015)
- Pritha Roy as Phoolmoni - Manglu's wife and Baha's friend (2012 – 2015)
- Sairity Banerjee as Archi's colleague (2011 – 2012)
- Smritika Majumder / Ruchira as Ishmita – Kamalika's colleague (2011)
- Debolina Mukherjee as Debolina (in Archi and Kamalika's honeymoon) (2012)
- Honey Bafna as Arjo's colleague (2014)

=== Guest appearance ===
- Prosenjit Chatterjee for promotion of Mishawr Rawhoshyo (2013)
- Aryann Bhowmik for promotion of Mishawr Rawhoshyo (2013)
- Lovely Maitra as Kaju from Jol Nupur for Poila Baisakh celebration (2013)
- Moushumi Chatterjee for promotion of Goynar Baksho at Poila Baisakh celebration (2013)
- Konkona Sen Sharma for promotion of Goynar Baksho at Poila Baisakh celebration (2013)

== Awards ==
Year	Award	Category	Character	Actress
2012	Star Jalsha Parivaar Awards	Sera Bor	Archi	Rishi Kaushik
2012	Star Jalsha Parivaar Awards	Priyo Chele	Archi	Rishi Kaushik
2012	Star Jalsha Parivaar Awards	Priyo Mojar Sodossyo	Baha	Ranieeta Das
2012	Star Jalsha Parivaar Awards	Priyo Mojar Sodossyo	Hirnamoy-Baha	Santu Mukhopadhyay- Ranieeta Das
2012	Star Jalsha Parivaar Awards	Priyo Ja	Radharani	Saswati Guhathakurata
2012	Star Jalsha Parivaar Awards	Priyo Poribar	Ishti Kutum Poribar	
2013	Star Jalsha Parivaar Awards	Sera Bor	Archi	Rishi Kaushik
2013	Star Jalsha Parivaar Awards	Priyo Chele	Archi	Rishi Kaushik
2013	Star Jalsha Parivaar Awards	Sera Meye	Baha	Ranieeta Das
2013	Star Jalsha Parivaar Awards	Sera Bou	Baha	Ranieeta Das
2013	Star Jalsha Parivaar Awards	Priyo Ja	Radharani	Saswati Guhathakurata
2013	Star Jalsha Parivaar Awards	Sera Baba	Dibyajyoti	Shankar Chakraborty
2013	Star Jalsha Parivaar Awards	Sera Bhasur	Dhritiman	Badshah Moitra
2013	Star Jalsha Parivaar Awards	Priyo Poribar	Ishti Kutum Poribar	
2014	Star Jalsha Parivaar Awards	Sera Meye	Baha	Ranieeta Das
2014	Star Jalsha Parivaar Awards	Priyo Chele	Archi	Rishi Kaushik
2014	Star Jalsha Parivaar Awards	Priyo Jaa	Sanjhbati	Bidipta Chakraborty
2014	Star Jalsha Parivaar Awards	Priyo Nonod	Rupu	Sahana Sen
2015	Star Jalsha Parivaar Awards	Sera Meye	Baha	Sudipta Chakraborty
2015	Star Jalsha Parivaar Awards	Priyo Dosor	Komolika-Bikram	Ankita Chakraborty-Koushik Roy
2015	Star Jalsha Parivaar Awards	Priyo Bhai	Archi	Rishi Kaushik
2015	Star Jalsha Parivaar Awards	Evergreen Juti	Hirnamoy-Rani	Santu Mukhopadhyay- Saswati Guhathakurata
2016	Star Jalsha Parivaar Awards	Hall of Fame (for running for a long time on Star Jalsha)	Baha and Archi	Sudipta Chakraborty Rishi Kaushik

== Adaptations ==
Language	Title	Original release	Network(s)	Last aired	Notes
Bengali	Ishti Kutum ইষ্টি কুটুম	24 October 2011	Star Jalsha	13 December 2015	Original
Hindi	Mohi – Ek Khwab Ke Khilne Ki Kahani मोही – एक ख्बाव की खिलनेकी कहानी	10 August 2015	StarPlus	27 February 2016	Remake
Malayalam	Neelakkuyil നീലക്കുയിൽ	26 February 2018	Asianet	6 April 2020	Remake
Tamil	Neelakuyil நீல குயீல்	17 December 2018	Star Vijay	24 August 2019	Remake
Hindi	Imlie इमली	16 November 2020	StarPlus	17 September 2022	Remake
Telugu	Malli Nindu Jabili మల్లి నిండు జాబిలి	28 February 2022	Star Maa	31 March 2026	Remake
Marathi	Kunya Rajachi Ga Tu Rani कुन्या राजाची गं तू राणी	18 July 2023	Star Pravah	16 March 2024	Remake
Hindi	Jhanak 2 झनक	9 June 2025	Star Plus	31 May 2026	Inspired

== Reception ==
Audience reception is very poor. This show has been controversial because of its poor and misleading content. The show also promoted adultery, extramarital affair through its storyline as most Leena Gangopadhyay serials always do. This has also enraged the tribal community of West Bengal for hurting their sentiments and portraying tribal characters poorly. A lawsuit was filed by the tribal community in July 2014 in Kolkata High Court against the channel for portraying tribal women's characters in poor light as well as ridiculing their language and culture. Though the channel denied all charges, there was an uproar from the audience regarding the themes of cheating women, and domestic violence, provocation of suicide etc. by the lead characters of Archi and Baha. Viewers especially disliked the language of the show and characterized it as overall offensive.
