= Sevvanthi (TV series) =

2022 Indian Tamil language drama

- Genre: Drama
- Written by: S.Marudhu sankar S.Kumaresan; Jo.George; Dialogues; S.Marudhu sankar A.K.Pandiya
- Screenplay by: S.Kumaresan; Jo.George
- Directed by: O.N.Rathnam; Jahir Hussain; Ve.Ma.Senthil Kumar
- Starring: Divya Sridhar
- Theme music composer: Suganth Jo (Background score)
- Opening theme: "Nenjil Nenjil Neengadha Sevvanthi Nee" (Madhu Balakrishnan and Vandhana Srinivasan) (Pa.Vijay Lyrics)
- Country of origin: India
- Original language: Tamil
- No. of seasons: 1
- No. of episodes: 900

Production
- Camera setup: Multi-Camera
- Running time: 22 minutes
- Production companies: Sun Entertainment; 18 Reels Private Limited

Original release
- Network: Sun TV
- Release: 11 July 2022 – 12 July 2025

Sevanthi (transl. Beautiful Flower) was an Indian Tamil-language family drama television series, starring Divya Sridhar and Nakshatra. It premiered on 11 July 2022 and ended on 12 July 2025 aired on Sun TV. It is also available on the digital platform Sun NXT.

== Plot ==
Sevvanthi faces many struggles in life. Her husband Manohar Annamalai alias Mano takes care of her, guided by his best friend Karthik. After Manohar's death Sevvanthi comes with burden & whole responsibility to take care of the entire home as a single mother.

== Cast ==
=== Main ===
- Divya Sridhar as Sevanthi: Manohar's widow
- Raaghav as Manohar "Mano" Annamalai (Died)
- Nakshatra as Sindhu

=== Recurring ===
- Sivanya Priyanka as Poornima: Raghu's wife
- Vinoth KG as Raghunandhan Annamalai alias (Raghu)
- Azhagu as Annamalai
- Jayanthi Narayanan as Rajeshwari Annamalai
- Premi as Annamalai's mother
- Ashwanth Thilak as Gowtham: Chatrapathi and Revathi's son
- Rishi Keshav as Chatrapathi: Gowtham's father; Revathi's husband
- Sonia as Pavithra: Babu's wife
- Divyadharshini as Madhumitha alias "Madhu": Sevanthi's adopted daughter
- Aalam as Aravind: Sevanthi's son
- Prithiksha Sankar as Nandhini: Sevanthi's daughter
- Swetha Kannikan as Vidhya: Madhu's friend, Arjun sister
- Ashik Shahulhameed as Arjun: Vidhya's brother
- Jayaraman Mohan as Krishna: Radha's husband; Sevanthi's brother
- Neepa (old) / Priyanka (new) as Radha Krishna
- Vijay Krishnaraj as Sevanthi's father
- Ramya Gowda (old) / Gracy Thangavel (new) as Archana Shiva
- Arun Chandra Kumar as Suresh
- SK Sivanya as Aishwarya Suresh
- Sri Vidhya Shankar as Rajam
- Andrew Jesudoss as Sundharam
- Arunkumar Rajan as Inspector Surya
- Madhan as Vicky, a women kidnapper
- Maanas as Shiva
- Premalatha as Devi
- Nithin Krish Iyer as Karthik
- 'Ahalya' Malli as Umapathy

=== Special Appearance ===
- Sambhavi Gurumoorthy as Shruti
- Pandavar Illam Family Members
- Sandhya Jagarlamudi as Sandhya IPS
- Birla Bose as Sandhya's husband
- Preethi Sanjeev as Durga

== Production ==
=== Casting ===
Divya Sridhar was selected to play the titular role Sevvanthi along with film actor Raaghav making his return to television after an hiatus of 9 years. In March 2023, Nithin Krish Iyer quit the show saying, "I, never got a chance to showcase my performance and skills as an actor. I never got to work for more than 2-3 days a month".

== Adaptations ==
Language	Title	Original release	Network(s)	Last aired	Notes	Ref.
Telugu	Geethanjali గీతాంజలి	27 February 2023	Gemini TV	25 May 2024	Remake	
Malayalam	Sita Ramam സീതാ രാമം	13 March 2023	Surya TV	25 June 2023	Remake	
