= Phulala Sugandha Maticha =

Indian television show

- Genre: Drama
- Created by: Shashi Sumeet Productions
- Based on: Diya Aur Baati Hum
- Written by: Sameer Garud; Gauri Kodimala; Revati Kodimala; Shilpa Navalkar
- Directed by: Deepak Nalawade; Girish Vasaikar
- Starring: See below
- Opening theme: "Ya Phulala Sugandha Maticha" by Kirti Killedar and Aniruddha Joshi
- Composer: Nilesh Moharir
- Country of origin: India
- Original language: Marathi
- No. of episodes: 730

Production
- Producers: Shashi Mittal; Sumeet Mittal
- Cinematography: Rashid Beg
- Editor: Lalsahab Yadav
- Camera setup: Multi-camera
- Running time: 22 minutes
- Production company: Shashi Sumeet Productions

Original release
- Network: Star Pravah
- Release: 2 September 2020 – 4 December 2022

Phulala Sugandha Maticha (transl. Flower Has the Fragrance of Soil) is an Indian Marathi language television series that aired on Star Pravah. It premiered on 2 September 2020 and ended on 4 December 2022. It stars Harshad Atkari and Samruddhi Kelkar in lead roles. The show is an official adaptation of the StarPlus series Diya Aur Baati Hum. Both shows are produced by Shashi and Sumeet Mittal under the banner Shashi Sumeet Productions.

== Plot ==
Set on backdrop of Shirdi. The story centers upon a 20-year-old college student, Kirti, whose dream is to become an Indian Police Service officer and Shubham, a sweetshop owner and sweetmaker. Kirti's dreams and aspirations are destroyed as she loses her parents in a terrorist attack. Planning to move abroad, her brother Sagar fixes her marriage to Shubham whose strict mother Jiji Akka wants her daughter-in-law to be simple and not well-educated, with the excellent skills of a housewife.

After discovering this, Sagar lies about Kirti's education level to both his family and the Jamkhedkars in order to ensure her settlement. Kirti gives up her education and dreams, accepting her roles as a wife and the elder daughter-in-law of the family. Soon, as her truth of being educated and not knowing cooking is revealed, Jiji Akka banishes her. The story shows and further describes how Shubham becomes her full-strength and helps her to fulfil her dreams.

== Cast ==
=== Main ===
- Samruddhi Kelkar as IPS Kirti Jamkhedkar (née Kadam)– Mangesh and Sharada's daughter; Sagar's sister; Shubham's wife
- Harshad Atkari as Shubham Jamkhedkar – Chandrakala and Daulatrao's eldest son; Vikram, Tushar and Janhavi's brother; Kirti's husband

=== Recurring ===
Shubham's family

- Aditi Deshpande as Chandrakala "Jiji Akka" Jamkhedkar – Daulatrao's wife; Shubham, Vikram, Tushar and Janhavi's mother; Sonu and Pari's grandmother
- Prashant Choudappa as Daulatrao "Bhau" Jamkhedkar – Chandrakala's husband; Shubham, Vikram, Tushar and Janhavi's father; Sonu and Pari's grandfather
- Tushar Sali / Mayur More as Vikram Jamkhedkar – Chandrakala and Daulatrao's second son; Shubham, Tushar and Janhavi's brother; Sonali's husband; Sonu's father
- Aishwarya Shete / Kanchan Prakash as Sonali Jamkhedkar – Vikram's wife; Sonu's mother
- Akash Patil as Tushar Jamkhedkar – Chandrakala and Daulatrao's youngest son; Shubham, Vikram and Janhavi's brother; Emily's husband; Pari's father
- Madhura Joshi as Emily Jamkhedkar – Tushar's wife; Pari's mother
- Bhumija Patil as Janhavi Jamkhedkar – Chandrakala and Daulatrao's daughter; Shubham, Vikram and Tushar's sister; Dilip's wife
- Nikita Patil as Bhingari
- Dutta Sagar as Lahanya

Kirti's family

- Sandeep Mehta as Mangesh Kadam – Sharada's husband; Sagar and Kirti's father
- Radhika Vidyasagar as Sharada Kadam – Mangesh's wife; Sagar and Kirti's mother
- Amogh Chandan as Sagar Kadam – Mangesh and Sharada's son; Kirti's brother; Aarti's husband
- Purva Phadake as Aarti Kadam – Sagar's wife

=== Others ===
- Usha Naik as Kakisaheb
- Girish Oak as Swami Avatar Swarup Maharaj
- Tejashri Pradhan as guest
- Kalyani Tapase as Madhuri
- Ajinkya Pitale as Sandy
- Shekhar Phadake as Kiran
- Sai Ranade as Lily
- Bhagyashri Navale as Kavita
- Shreyas Raje as Rajkumar (Raju)
- Gayatri Soham as Maya
- Manasi Kulkarni as Agrima
- Amey Borkar as Sanjay Borkar
- Rohit Parshuram as Rahul
- Bhagyashri Dalvi as Disha
- Ketaki Palav as Roma

== Reception ==
=== Ratings ===
Week	Year	BARC Viewership		Ref.
Week	Year	TRP	Rank	Ref.
Week 39	2020	3.9	3	
Week 40	2020	4.5	2	
Week 41	2020	4.4	1	
Week 42	2020	4.6	2	
Week 43	2020	5.0	2	
Week 44	2020	5.0	2	
Week 45	2020	5.6	1	
Week 46	2020	4.8	2	
Week 47	2020	4.2	5	
Week 48	2020	6.1	1	
Week 49	2020	5.9	1	
Week 50	2020	5.4	3	
Week 51	2020	5.0	3	
20 December 2020	Maha Episode	4.2	4	
Week 52	2020	5.3	3	
Week 1	2021	4.7	4	
Week 2	2021	4.4	3	
Week 3	2021	4.5	2	
Week 4	2021	5.8	1	
Week 5	2021	4.7	2	
Week 6	2021	6.0	1	
7 February 2021	Maha Episode	4.3	3	
Week 7	2021	4.7	3	
Week 8	2021	5.6	1	
Week 9	2021	5.3	3	
Week 10	2021	4.4	4	
Week 11	2021	4.5	3	
Week 12	2021	6.1	3	
Week 13	2021	6.2	1	
Week 14	2021	7.6	2	
Week 15	2021	5.1	3	
Week 17	2021	3.7	4	
Week 18	2021	6.8	1	
Week 19	2021	5.9	3	
Week 20	2021	6.5	1	
Week 21	2021	4.6	3	
Week 22	2021	3.9	5	
Week 32	2021	4.9	4	
Week 39	2022	5.1	1	

== Awards ==
Star Pravah Parivar Awards
Year	Category	Recipient	Roles
2021	Best Face Female	Samruddhi Kelkar	Kirti
2021	Best Husband	Harshad Atkari	Shubham
2021	Best Mother-in-law	Aditi Deshpande	Jiji Akka
2022	Best Husband	Harshad Atkari	Shubham
2022	Best Daughter-in-law	Samruddhi Kelkar	Kirti

== Adaptations ==
Language	Title	Original release	Network(s)	Last aired	Notes
Hindi	Diya Aur Baati Hum दिया और बाती हम	29 August 2011	StarPlus	10 September 2016	Original
Bengali	Tomay Amay Mile তোমায় আমায় মিলে	11 March 2013	Star Jalsha	20 March 2016	Remake
Malayalam	Parasparam പരസ്പരം	22 July 2013	Asianet	31 August 2018	Remake
Marathi	Phulala Sugandha Maticha फुलाला सुगंध मातीचा	2 September 2020	Star Pravah	4 December 2022	Remake
Tamil	Raja Rani 2 ராஜா ராணி 2	12 October 2020	Star Vijay	21 March 2023	Remake
Telugu	Janaki Kalaganaledu జానకి కలగనలేదు	22 March 2021	Star Maa	19 August 2023	Remake
