= Sita Ramam (TV series) =

2023 Indian Tamil language drama

- Genre: Drama
- Based on: Sevvanthi
- Written by: S.Indran
- Directed by: Biju Varghese
- Country of origin: India
- Original language: Malayalam
- No. of seasons: 1
- No. of episodes: 100

Production
- Producer: Biju Dhanan/ Dr.Santhosh
- Camera setup: Multi-Camera
- Running time: 22 minutes
- Production companies: Sun Entertainment; 18 Reels Private Limited

Original release
- Network: Surya TV
- Release: 13 March – 25 June 2023

Sitaramam is an Indian Malayalam language family drama television series, starring Snisha Chandran and Vivek Gopan. It premiered on Surya TV on 13 March 2023, and ended on 25 June 2023 and is available for streaming in selected markets on Sun NXT. The show is an official remake of Tamil television series Sevvanthi which is being aired on Sun TV.

== Cast ==
- Snisha Chandran as Sita Lakshmi a.k.a. sita
- Vivek Gopan as Ramdas a.k.a. Raman
- Reneesha Rahiman (Episode 1–22) / Raheena Anas (Episode 24–100) as Poornima (Poorni)
- Vishnu Mohan as Mahesh (Mahi): Raman's brother and Poornima's husband
- Ambika Mohan as Bharathi: Raman, Mahi, Aishwarya's mother
- M. R. Gopakumar as Sreedharan: Raman, Mahi, Aishwarya's father
- Anjusha Gopi as Aishwarya (Aishu): Raman and Mahi's sister
- Kalady Omana as Sundari Muthashi: Raman, Mahi, Aishwarya's grandmother
- Master Arjun Syam as Appu: Raman and Seeths's son
- Baby Devna P Didhin as Ammu: Raman and Seeths's daughter
- Pallavi Gowda as Meera: Raman's ex-girlfriend (episode 1-77)
- Lakshmi as Meenakshi: Meera's daughter
- Shalu Menon as Vasundhara: Poornima's mother
- Rahul Menon as Rajendran, Poornima's father
- Souparnika Subhash as Radha Venu: wife of Venu, Sita's sister in law
- Santhosh Sashidharan as Venu Narayanan: Sita's brother
- Vallikode Vikraman as Narayanan: Venu and Sita's father
- Ramya Sudha as Bhadra: Abhi's mother and Bhuvanachandran's wife, PWD ENGINEER
- Sreedev as Abhijit: Aishu's groom
- Prasanth Kumar as Rajeev: Raman's best friend
- Bindu Krishna as Gayathri: hostel warden who takes care of Meenu, Bhadra's sister, Abhijit's aunt
- Karthika Kannan as Rajeshwari : Rajendran's sister, Poornima's aunt
- Sarita balakrishnan as Mandakini : Bhuvanachandran's sister, Abhijit's aunt

== Adaptations ==
Language	Title	Original release	Network(s)	Last aired	Notes
Tamil	Sevvanthi செவ்வந்தி	11 July 2022	Sun TV	Ongoing	Original
Telugu	Geethanjali గీతాంజలి	27 February 2023	Gemini TV	Ongoing	Remake
Malayalam	Sita Ramam സീതാ രാമം	13 March 2023	Surya TV	25 June 2023	Remake
