= Karthika Deepam (Malayalam TV series) =

Indian television series

- Genre: Soap opera
- Written by: pradeep panicker
- Directed by: Ajay Narayanan
- Opening theme: "Chambavu Vithernja Paadam"
- Composer: Gopi Sundar
- Country of origin: India
- Original language: Malayalam
- No. of seasons: 1
- No. of episodes: 672

Production
- Producer: Mahesh Kozhencherry
- Camera setup: Multi-camera
- Running time: 22 minutes
- Production company: Blueline Movies

Original release
- Network: Zee Keralam
- Release: 13 July 2020 – 11 September 2022

Karthika Deepam (transl. Festival of Lights) is an Indian Malayalam television series which is broadcasting on Zee Keralam and streams on ZEE5 platform. It stars Snisha Chandran, Yadhu Krishnan, Vivek Gopan and Reshmi Soman in the lead roles. The series premiered on 13 July 2020.

== Cast ==
=== Main ===
- Snisha Chandran as Karthika Arun /Karthu
  - Kannan and Pavithra's foster daughter, Arun's Wife
- Yadhukrishnan as Kannan
  - Kanaka's elder son, Karthika's foster father and Pavithra's husband
- Vivek Gopan as Arun
  - Karthika's husband
- Reshmi Soman as Devanandha
  - Arun's Paternal aunt, Karthika's biological mother

=== Recurring ===
- Amritha Varnan/Sumi Santhosh as Pavithra
  - Kannan's wife and Karthika's foster mother
- Akhil Anand as Dheepan
  - Kannan, Arun and Pappan's friend, Vijitha's second husband, Dr.Jeevan's younger brother
- Giridhar as Pappan
  - Kannan's friend
- Kottayam Rasheed as Karunan
  - Kanaka's brother, Vijitha's father
- Jismy as Vijitha
  - Unni's former wife, Karunan and Sudha's daughter
- Sreekala as Kanaka
  - Kannan and Unni's mother
- Roshan Ullas as Dr. Unnikrishnan/Unni
  - Kanaka's younger son, Vijitha's ex-husband
  - Malu's husband
- Vijayakumari as Sudha
  - Karunan's wife and Vijitha's mother
- Divya Yesodharan as Manju
  - Arun's sister-in-law
- Deepika Mohan as Malathi
  - Arun and Anandhu's mother
- Sreelekshmi Sreekumar / Anjusha P G as Malavika
  - Devanandha's youngest daughter
  - Unni's second wife
- Rafi as Anandhu
  - Arun's brother and Manju's husband
- V.K Baiju as Dr. Jeevan
  - Nitha's husband, Karthika's biological father and Dheepan's elder brother
- Jayasoman as Sharath
  - Devananda's husband
  - Malu's father
- Divya M Nair as Nitha
- Jayaprakash as Vishwan
  - Karunan's friend
- Sudha Nair as Padmini
  - Pavithra's elder sister, Manju's house maid
- Shyjan Sreevalsan as Susheelan
  - Padmini's husband
- Bindhu Krishnan as Jayasree
  - Jeevan and Dheepan's sister
- Kalabhavan Jinto as Sudhevan
  - Jayasree's husband
- Haridas Varkala as Haridas

=== Cameo appearance ===
(in wedding episodes)

- Shiju
- Srinish Aravind
- Stebin Jacob
- Amala Gireesan
- Mersheena Neenu
- Sushmitha Prabhakar

== Music ==
The title song was sung by Vaikom Vijayalakshmi and Nanjiyamma. The song been composed by Gopi Sundar.
