= Harshad Atkari =

Indian actor

- Born: 17 October 1987 (age 38); Mumbai, Maharashtra, India
- Occupation: Actor
- Years active: 2013–present
- Known for: Durva; Phulala Sugandha Maticha; Kunya Rajachi Ga Tu Rani

Harshad Atkari is an Indian actor who primarily works in Marathi television and film industry. He was born on 17 October 1987 and currently lives in Mumbai, Maharashtra. He is widely known for his roles in Durva as Keshav Sane and Phulala Sugandha Maticha as Shubham Jamkhedkar.

== Career ==
Atkari started his career with Marathi series Durva in 2013 as Keshav Sane. He starred in Anjali - Jhep Swapnanchi in 2016. He also appeared in the series Saare Tujhyachsathi. In 2020, he played a lead role in Phulala Sugandha Maticha as Shubham Jamkhedkar.

His most recent lead role was in Star Pravah's Kunya Rajachi Ga Tu Rani as Kabir.

He has worked in the Marathi film Sshort and Ssweet.

== Filmography ==
=== Television ===
Year	Title	Role	Ref.
2013-2016	Durva	Keshav Sane	
2017	Anjali - Jhep Swapnanchi	Dr. Yashaswi Khanapurkar	
2018-2019	Saare Tujhyachsathi	Kartik	
2020-2022	Phulala Sugandha Maticha	Shubham Jamkhedkar	
2022	Aata Hou De Dhingana	Contestant	
2023-2024	Kunya Rajachi Ga Tu Rani	Kabir Sarpotdar	

=== Films ===
Year	Title	Role	Notes
2014	Moon's Shadow	Dev	Short film
2014	The Judgment Day	Shashank	Short film
2023	Sshort And Ssweet	Sanju	Lead role
