= Durva (TV series) =

Indian television series

- Genre: Political drama
- Directed by: Deepak Nalawade
- Starring: See below
- Country of origin: India
- Original language: Marathi
- No. of episodes: 1164

Production
- Producers: Nitin Vaidya; Ninad Vaidya
- Camera setup: Multi-camera
- Running time: 22 minutes
- Production company: Dashami Creations

Original release
- Network: Star Pravah
- Release: 18 March 2013 – 12 November 2016

Durva is an Indian Marathi language television series that aired on Star Pravah. It is produced by Nitin Vaidya and Ninad Vaidya under the banner of Dashami Creations. The series aired from 18 March 2013 to 12 November 2016 with 1164 episodes. It stars Hruta Durgule, Suyash Tilak and Harshad Atkari in lead roles.

== Plot ==
It is a story of two rivalry families - Patil and Kshirsagar fighting for political power in Satara. Durva, an innocent girl, gets married in the family to Bhupati, where everyone uses her to gain political prestige. Amongst this Durva fighting for her rights forms the crux of the story.

== Cast ==
=== Main ===
- Hruta Durgule as Durva Bhupati Patil / Durva Keshav Sane
- Suyash Tilak as Bhupati Patil
- Harshad Atkari as Keshav Dada Sane

=== Recurring ===
- Prasad Pandit as Patil Anna
- Ashwini Ekbote as Bhupati's mother
- Hardeek Joshi as Purushottam Gokhale
- Uday Tikekar as Devkishan Sarda
- Shalmalee Tolye as Durva's sister-in-law
- Shruja Prabhudesai as Mohini
- Vinay Apte / Sharad Ponkshe as Anna Patil

== Awards ==
Awards	Category	Recipient	Role
Ma.Ta. Sanman 2014	Best Series	Ninad Vaidya	
Ma.Ta. Sanman 2014	Best Supporting Actor	Vinay Apte	
Ma.Ta. Sanman 2014	Best Screenplay	Sachin Darekar	
