= Reshmi Soman =

Indian actress

- Occupations: Actress, Dancer, Presenter
- Years active: 1993–2010, 2013- 2015, 2020- present
- Spouses: A.M.Nazeer (m. 2001; div. 2012) Gopinath (m. 2015)

Reshmi Soman is an Indian actress working in Malayalam television soap operas. She made her debut in the Malayalam film, Maghrib in year 1993. Later she established herself as the most bankable actress in Malayalam Television with back to back hit serials like Hari, Thaali, Akshayapathram, Saptani, Akkarapacha and Bharya. Post marriage moved on to online media platform through her YouTube channel Ray's world of colors. Reshmi is also a professional Bharatnatyam, Kuchipudi and Mohiniyattam dancer. She has also portrayed double role ( Kamala & Sridevi) in an amateur drama, Arikil Oral.

== Television ==
=== Television serials (partial) ===
Year	Title	Channel	Role	Notes
1999	Hari	DD Malayalam	Mallika	
1999-2001	Samayam	Asianet	Krishna & Chandra	
2000	Murappennu	DD Malayalam		
2000-2001	Thali	Surya TV	Padmaja	
2001	Makal Marumagal	Surya TV		
2001	Akshayapathram	Asianet	Kamala	
2001	Sapathni	Asianet	Suneethi	
2001	Bharya	Asianet	Rema	
2001	Swararagam	Asianet	Deva Manohari	
2001	Aparna	Asianet		
2002	Akkarapacha	Asianet	Suneethi	
2002	Anna	Kairali TV	Anna Julie Andrews	
2003	Mangalyam	Asianet	Shivani	
2004	Kadamattathu Kathanar	Asianet	Emily Nicholas	
2004	12 3 Saat	Asianet		
2005	Manthrakodi	Asianet	Revathi	
2005	Krishnakripasagaram	Amrita TV	Yashodha	
2005	Mounam	Surya TV		
2006	Vikramadithyan	Asianet	Kumari	
2006	Shanghu Pushpam	Asianet		
2007	Nombarapoovu	Asianet	Balamani	
2007	Swami Ayyappan (TV series)	Asianet		
2008	Sreekrishnaleela	Asianet		
2008-2010	Makalude Amma	Surya TV	Sundari Amma /Devika	
2013-2014	Penmanassu	Surya TV	Aleena	
2015	Vivahitha	Mazhavil Manorama	Archana	Replaced by Niya
2020	Anuragam	Mazhavil Manorama	Hemambika	Comeback
2021	Ente Maathavu	Surya TV	Aami	guest appearance
2021-2022	Karthika Deepam	Zee Keralam	Devanandha	
2022–2023	Bhagyalakshmi	Zee Keralam	Bhagyalakshmi	Replaced Sonia
2023	Chandrikayilaliyunna Chandrakantham	Asianet	Lakshmi	Replaced by Sajitha Betti
2023–2024	Mayamayooram	Zee Keralam	Devayani	
2024	Kadhanayika	Mazhavil Manorama	Meera	
2024- 2025	Meenu's Kitchen	Mazhavil Manorama	Shivaranjini	
2025–present	Chempaneer Poovu	Asianet	Chandramathi	Replaced Padma George

As Host

- Super Dish (Surya TV) - 2012
- Tharavismayam (Surya TV)
- Treat (Media One) - 2015
- My Super Chef (Asianet News) - 2019
- Ray's World of Colours (YouTube) 2019–Present

Reality Shows as Judge

- Veruthe Alla Bharya Season 3 (Mazhavil Manorama) - 2016
- Dazzling Friends Hunt (Kairali TV) - 2012

Other roles

- Flowers Oru Kodi as Participant - 2022
- Madhuram Shobhanam as Dancer - 2021
- Bzinga as Participant - 2021
- Onnum Onnum Moonu as Guest - 2015, 2020
- Ivide Ingannanu Bhai as Guest - 2015
- Fast Track as Guest
- Santhosh Brahmi ad as Model

== Filmography ==
Year	Title	Role	Notes
1993	Magrib	Young Arifa	
1994	Chakoram	Sunanda	
1995	Aadyathe Kanmani	Ambika's sister	
1995	Aniyan Bava Chetan Bava	Seetha, Premachandran's sister	
1995	Saadaram	Sreekutty	
1996	Ishtamanu Nooru Vattam	Shilpa Fernandez	Debut as heroine
1996	Saamoohyapaadam	Sridevi	
1997	Varnapakittu	Mollykutty	
1997	Kannur	Sajira	
1998	Ennu Swantham Janakikutty	Sarojini	
1999	Prem Poojari	Priya	
2000	Dreams	Shyama	
2000	Sradha	Beena	
2000	Arayannagalude Veedu	Premalatha	
2000	Susanna	Soosanna's daughter	
2023	Live	Dr. Nikhila	
