= Ente Maathavu =

Indian Malayalam TV series

- Genre: Soap opera
- Created by: Binu K. Punnoos
- Written by: Sinoj Nedungolam
- Story by: B & L Productions
- Directed by: Venu Chelakkottu
- Creative directors: Sajeev Thaannoor; Prasad Kizhissherry
- Theme music composer: Ranjin Raj
- Opening theme: "Kaatinum Kidaade Ninn"
- Ending theme: "Sughangal Thediyo"
- Country of origin: India
- Original language: Malayalam
- No. of seasons: 1
- No. of episodes: 573

Production
- Executive producer: Vijit K.V.
- Producer: Binu K. Punnoos
- Cinematography: Vishnu Santhosh
- Editor: Libin George
- Camera setup: Multi-camera
- Running time: 18–31 minutes
- Production companies: Beegee Communications (Episode 1 to 226); B & L Productions (Episode 227 - 573)

Original release
- Network: Surya TV
- Release: 27 January 2020 – 25 June 2022

Ente Maathavu was an Indian Malayalam television series directed by Venu Chelakkottu. The show premiered on Surya TV and started streaming on Sun NXT on 27 January 2020. The show aired its last episode on 25 June 2022.

== Plot ==
Angel, whose mother died after giving birth to her, prays to the Virgin Mary every day. Feeling alone and abandoned in the world, Angel seeks solace in prayer. She comes to consider Mother Mary as a replacement for her deceased mother.

== Cast ==
Lead Cast

- Eileen Eliza as Angel and Jewel (Dual role)
- Vishnu Prasad as Johnson (Angel's father, Main male lead)
- M. R. Gopakumar as Father Idikula
- Sreedevi Anil as Annie (Angel's stepmother)(Former Antagonist)
- Binsa Mariam as Isa (Angel's stepsister)
- ____ as Kevin (Angel and Isa's half brother, Johnson and Annie's son)

Recurring Cast

- Santhosh Sasidharan as CI Benjamin
- Sajan Surya as Dr.Murali
- Shelly Kishore as Jeena
- Ajay Thomas as Solaman (Angel's 1st elder uncle)
- Vijay Anand as Samuel
- Neeraja Das as Nancy
- Souparnika Subash as Mohita, Murali's wife
- Arun G Raghavan as Roshan
- Shalu Kurian as Sophy
- Rishi as Lucifer(Antagonist)
- ___ as Kunjatta
- Shobi Thilakan as Bhoominathan
- Molly Kannamaly as Katrina
- Kalabhavan Jinto as Luca (Angel's 2nd elder uncle, Former Antagonist)
- Beena Antony as Nethravathi
- Reshmi Soman as Aami
- Renjusha Menon as Elsa (Former Antagonist)
- Sini Varghese as Tesa (Luca's wife, Angel's 2nd aunt)
- Kulappulli Leela as Annie Ammachi
- T.S.Raju as Bhaskaran
- Valsala Menon as Valyamachi
- Mallika Sukumaran as Molly
- Shivaji Guruvayoor as Paulo
- Maneesha K. Subrahmaniam as Rebecca
- Nandakishor Nellical as Kapyar Chandy
- Omana Ouseph as Sethulakshmi
- Shobha Mohan as Alice
- Premi Viswanath as Devika
- Jinza Sarah As Anna
- Rajesh Paravoor as Civil Police Officer Anwar
- Aleena Tresa George as Chithralekha (Antagonist)
- _____ as Rosemol
- _____ as Devi
- ____ as Appu
- ____ as Thamara
- Sumesh Chandran as Isaa's father
- Nimisha Bijo as Doctor
- Gyandev as Jayaram
- Guinness Pakru as himself
- Manu Martin Pallippadan as Vikki
- Kezia
- Vyjayanthi as Sonia
- Manjadi Joby as Esther
- Arjun S Kalathingal as Sudeep
- Tony as Sudeep's father
- Ravikrishnan Gopalakrishnan as
- Stella Raja

Former Cast

- Sarayu Mohan as Helan Valookkaran (Main female lead)
- Ambika Mohan as Mother of Helan
- Adithyan Jayan as Benny (Antagonist)(dead)
- Naseer Sankranthi as Kapyar Pyli
- Santhosh Keezhattoor as Devaraj (dead)
- _____ as Jessy(dead)
- Ramesh Kottayam as Ambanadan Philippos (Angel's grandfather, dead)
- Divya Yeshodharan as Sara (Angel's mother, dead)
- Subbalakshmi as Valyammachi
- Annmaria as Clara
- Sarath Swamy as Aparichithan
- Baby Kalyani
- Stephy Leon as Unknown lady (Cameo Appearance)
- Vijayakumari as Ammachi

== Title song ==
No.	Title	Lyrics	Music	Singers	Length
1.	"Kaatilum Kidaathe Nee" "കാറ്റിലും കിടാതെ നീ"	Ajeesh Dasan	Ranjin Raj	Sreya Jayadeep; Merin George	1:37
2.	"Nilave Nilave Naruvin Nilave" "നിലവേ നിലവേ നറുവിൻ നിലവേ"		Sreya S.Ajith; Shobha Shivaani	Sreya S.Ajith; Shobha Shivaani	3:57
Total length:					5:34
