= Sshort and Ssweet =

- Theatrical release poster
- Directed by: Ganesh Dinkar Kadam
- Written by: Swapnil Barskar
- Produced by: Payal Ganesh Kadam; Vinod Rao
- Starring: Sonali Kulkarni; Harshad Atkari; Rasika Sunil; Shridhar Watsar; Ajit Bhure; Onkar Bhojane; Tushar Khair
- Cinematography: Rahul Janardhan Jadhav
- Edited by: Deepak Marou
- Music by: Santosh Mulekar
- Production company: Shubham Productions
- Release date: 3 November 2023
- Country: India
- Language: Marathi

Sshort and Ssweet is a 2023 Indian Marathi-language family drama film directed by Ganesh Dinkar Kadam and written by Swapnil Barskar. The film is produced by Payal Ganesh Kadam along with Vinod Rao. The film stars Sonali Kulkarni, Harshad Atkari, Rasika Sunil, Shridhar Watsar, Ajit Bhure, Onkar Bhojane, and Tushar Khair.

The parents of Sonali Kulkarni made guest appearance in the film.

== Cast ==
- Sonali Kulkarni as Tanvi
- Harshad Atkari as Sanju
- Rasika Sunil
- Shridhar Watsar
- Ajit Bhure
- Onkar Bhojane
- Tushar Khair

== Release ==
The film was theatrically released on 3 November 2023 in Maharashtra.

== Reception ==
=== Critical response ===
A reviewer from The Times of India wrote "the film is hindered by a weak story and inconsistent screenplay, despite its noble intentions to address body shaming and promote acceptance." In a negative review the Film Information opined overall average film.
