= Geethanjali (2023 TV series) =

Indian Telugu language soap opera

- Genre: Drama; Family
- Written by: Dialogues; Srinivas Palapati
- Screenplay by: C Eswar; Balaji
- Story by: Kumaresan
- Directed by: Tava Karthik (1 - 115); Bairi Naresh (116 - present)
- Starring: Sujitha; Ravi kiran
- Opening theme: "Prati inta koluvina geethanjali" Sagar (lyrics); Madhubala Krishnan (vocals)
- Composer: Dinesh
- Country of origin: India
- Original language: Telugu
- No. of seasons: 1
- No. of episodes: 388

Production
- Producer: Dr P Satish Kumar
- Cinematography: K Ram Singh (Sica); S Saravanan
- Editor: S Nagarajan
- Camera setup: Multi-camera
- Running time: 20-22 minutes
- Production company: 18 Reels Private Limited

Original release
- Network: Gemini TV
- Release: 27 February 2023 – 25 May 2024

Related
- Sevvanthi

Geethanjali is an Indian Telugu language soap opera premiered on 27 February 2023 airing on Gemini TV and it is available for worldwide streaming on Sun NXT. The show stars Sujitha and Ravikiran in lead roles. The show is an official remake of Tamil television series Sevvanthi which is being aired on Sun TV.

== Cast ==
=== Main cast ===
- Sujitha as Geethanjali
- Ravikiran as Ramu, Geethanjali and Shruti's husband (deceased)

=== Supporting cast ===
- Arun Chandrakumar as Suresh, Rajam's Son
- George Vishnu as Sundaram, Suresh's father and Rajam's husband
- Sai Madhavi as Rajyam, Suresh's mother
- Lahari / Ramya Gowda as Poornima, Raghu's wife
- Nathan Shyam as Raghu, Ramu's younger brother
- Preethi Kumar as Aishwarya, Ramu and Raghu's sister
- Narasimha Raju as Shivayya (Ramu, Raghu and Aishwarya's father)
- Lakshmi Siddhaiah as Parvathi (Ramu, Raghu and Aishwarya's mother)
- Dubbing Janaki / Bheeshma Sujatha as Ramu, Raghu and Aishwarya's grand mother
- Mansi Joshi as Shruti, Ramu's first wife (deceased)
- Raaghav / Vinay Yuvraj as Karthik, Ramu's best friend
- Master Nidhish as Aravind (Ramu and Geetha's son)
- Baby Riya Manoj as Anjali
- Sumangali as Poornima's father
- Jayanth as Poornima's father
- G V Narayana Rao as Geethanjali's father
- Jayaraman Mohan as Krishna, Geethanjali's brother
- Archana as Radha, Krishna's wife

== Adaptations ==
Language	Title	Original release	Network(s)	Last aired	Notes
Tamil	Sevvanthi செவ்வந்தி	11 July 2022	Sun TV	Ongoing	Original
Telugu	Geethanjali గీతాంజలి	27 February 2023	Gemini TV	Ongoing	Remake
Malayalam	Sita Ramam സീതാ രാമം	13 March 2023	Surya TV	25 June 2023	Remake
