= Vivek Gopan =

Indian actor

- Born: 3 April 1983 (age 43); Kollam, Kerala
- Occupations: Actor, cricketer, dancer, politician
- Years active: 2013–present
- Political party: Bharatiya Janata Party

Vivek Gopan (born 3 April 1983) is an Indian television actor and politician who works in the Malayalam soap operas. He is one among the popular players of Celebrity Cricket League's team Amma Kerala strikers.

== Biography ==
Vivek was born to Gopakumar and Mangaladevi. He has a sister called Devika. He is married to Sumi and has a son called Sidharth.

== Political career ==
In February 2021, Vivek Gopan joined Bharatiya Janata Party and is the party's candidate for 2021 Kerala Legislative Assembly election from Chavara constituency in Kollam district. He came third.

He contested in 2026 Kerala Legislative Assembly election as BJP candidate from Aruvikkara Assembly constituency in Thiruvananthapuram district. He got third position.

=== Electoral performance ===
Election	Constituency	Political party	Alliance	Opposition candidate	Political party	Alliance	Result	Margin
2021	Chavara	BJP	NDA	Sujith Vijayanpillai	Ind.	LDF	Lost	49,071
2026	Aruvikkara	BJP	NDA	G. Steephen	CPI(M)	LDF	Lost	38,147

== Television ==
Year(s)	Show	Role	Channel	Notes
2013–2018	Parasparam	Sooraj	Asianet	
2018–2019	Thenum Vayambum	Sujith	Sun Surya	
2020–2022	Karthika Deepam	Arun	Zee Keralam	
2020	Kayyethum Doorath	Arun	Zee Keralam	Cameo in promo
2021	Mrs. Hitler	Arun	Zee Keralam	Cameo in promo
2023	Thoovalsparsham	Adv.Nithin Narendran	Asianet	
2023	Sitaramam	Ramdas a.k.a. Raman	Sun Surya	
2023– 2024	Sukhamo Devi	Murali	Flowers TV	Replaced By Stebin Jacob
2023	Balanum Ramayum	Antony	Mazhavil Manorama	Replaced By Mithun
2023– 2024	Kudumbashree Sharada	Dr.Abdul Kader	Zee Keralam	
2024	Mangalyam	Dr.Abdul Kader	Zee Keralam	
2024–2025	Madhuranombarakattu	Hari	Zee Keralam	
2024	Premam	Sidharth	Pocket FM	Web series
2026–present	Anju Sundarikal		Sun Surya	

=== TV shows ===
Year(s)	Show	Role	Channel	Ref
2015	Sell me the answer season 1	Himself as Participant	Asianet	
2017	Star War	Himself as Participant	Surya TV	
2017	Annies Kitchen	Himself as Guest	Amrita TV	
2018	Tamar Patar	Himself	Flowers TV	
2019	Day with a star	Himself	Kaumudy TV	
2019	Onnum Onnum Moonu	Himself as guest	Mazhavil Manorama	
2019	Immini Balya Fan	Judge	Amrita TV	
2019	Start Music	Himself as Participant	Asianet	
2019	Urvashi Theaters	Himself	Asianet	
2020	Safety Starts With Me	Host	YouTube	

== Filmography ==
- Oru Marubhoomikkadha (2011)
- Thalsamayam Oru Penkutty (2012)
- Ee Adutha Kalathu (2012)
- Kamaal Dhamaal Malamaal (2012)
- Nakhangal (2013)
- My Fan Ramu (2013)
- Loka Samastha (2015)
- Acha Dhin (2015)
- Thinkal Muthal Velli Vare (2015)
- Shyam (2016)
- Karinkunnam 6's (2016)
- Pullikkaran Staraa (2017)
- Oru Kuttanadan Blog (2018)
- Kalikoottukar (2019)
- Namaste India (2019)
- Vritham (2020)
- One (2021)
- Bazooka (2025)
