= My Fan Ramu =

- Directed by: Nikhil K. Menon
- Screenplay by: Saiju Kurup; Nikhil K. Menon
- Story by: Saiju Kurup
- Produced by: Sasi Ayyanchira
- Starring: Saiju Kurup; Rajeev Pillai
- Cinematography: Pappu
- Music by: Sanjeev Thomas
- Production company: Uthrattathi Films (P) Ltd.
- Release date: 4 January 2013
- Country: India
- Language: Malayalam

My Fan Ramu is a 2013 Malayalam film directed by debutant Nikhil K. Menon, starring Saiju Kurup and Rajeev Pillai in the lead roles. Actor Saiju Kurup has also written the script for the film, produced by Sasi Ayyanchira.

== Plot ==
Ramu, who is an ardent film buff, is nurturing exalted hopes of making it big as an actor someday. He is a diehard fan of young macho superstar Abhiram, the heartthrob of youngsters. Ramu's father runs a wayside ramshackle tea stall. Ramu looks down upon the lifestyle that has been bequeathed on him by his father. His cinematic ambitions which was going nowhere, suddenly receive a shot in the arm as he manages to emerge winner in a reality show, which offers the winner a chance to spend ten days with superstar Abhiram. Ramu accompanied by his sidekick and a naive moneylender, who is reluctant to let Ramu scot- free before his debt is settled, arrives at the superstar's home. The Superstar finds himself at his wits end, unable to tolerate the cumbersome threesome, who plays havoc with his privacy.

== Cast ==
- Saiju Kurup as Ramachandran aka Ramu
- Rajeev Pillai as Abhiram
- Bijukuttan as Kuttan
- Guinness Pakru as Banker Pappan
- Spadikam George as Swami
- Malavika Wales as Shalini
- Sudheer Karamana as ACP Umesh Shetty IPS
- Vivek Gopan as Siddik
- Kundara Johny as Commissioner Sathyasheelan
- Abi as Amrithraj
- Bheeman Raghu as Golden Roy
- V.K Baiju as CI Reghu
- Saiby Kidangoor as CI Iqbal
- P. Balachandran as Ramachandran
- Kalabhavan Prajod
- Bineesh Kodiyeri as Lankesh
- Joju George as Sanju
- Sajan Palluruthy
- Nishitha as Tanuja
- Durga as TV Anchor
- Samskruthy Shenoy as Channel representative
- Naveen Arakkal

(Special appearance)

- Nivin Pauly
- Munna Simon
- Nikhil Nair
- Nishanth Sagar
- Rejith Menon
