= Imlie =

Indian drama television series

- Genre: Drama
- Created by: Gul Khan
- Developed by: Leena Gangopadhyay
- Written by: Aparajita Sharma (Dialogues); Divy Nidhi Sharma (Dialogues & Original Lyrics); Shashibind Shukla
- Screenplay by: Vikas Sharma; Vera Raina; Sonakshi Khandelwal
- Story by: Ved Raj; Aakriti Atreja
- Directed by: Atif Khan; Rahul Tiwari; Ajay Kumar; Pawan Kumar Jha; Ashish Shrivastav
- Creative director: Muskan Bajaj
- Starring: Sumbul Touqeer; Gashmeer Mahajani; Mayuri Deshmukh; Fahmaan Khan; Megha Chakraborty; Seerat Kapoor; Karan Vohra; Adrija Roy; Sai Ketan Rao
- Theme music composer: Tapas Relia
- Opening theme: Imlie
- Composer: Nishant Raja
- Country of origin: India
- Original language: Hindi
- No. of seasons: 3
- No. of episodes: 1176

Production
- Producer: Gul Khan
- Production locations: Film City, Mumbai, Ramoji Film City
- Cinematography: Nidhin Valanday
- Editors: Shashank H. Singh; Krishna Mahto
- Camera setup: Multi-camera
- Running time: 21–23 minutes
- Production company: 4 Lions Films

Original release
- Network: StarPlus
- Release: 16 November 2020 – 12 May 2024

Related
- Ishti Kutum; Milon Tithi; Love Biye Aaj Kal

Imlie (transl. Tamarind) is an Indian Hindi-language drama television series that aired from 16 November 2020 to 12 May 2024 on StarPlus and streamed on Disney+ Hotstar. The show was produced by Gul Khan under 4 Lions Films. One of the longest running Indian television soap opera, the series starred Sumbul Touqeer, Gashmeer Mahajani, Mayuri Deshmukh, Fahmaan Khan for the first generation, Megha Chakraborty, Karan Vohra, Seerat Kapoor as the second generation, Adrija Roy and Sai Ketan Rao for the third and final generation.

== Plot ==
Imlie, an 18-year-old girl, is from Pagdandiya of Uttar Pradesh. Her mother, Meethi had a one-night stand with Dev Chaturvedi, who left her impregnated. So, the villagers came up with a rule that if a man spends a night with a girl, they must marry her. Satyakam, a farmer turned rebel, who is fighting for Pagdandia's rights, is Imlie's father-figure. Aditya (Adi) Kumar Tripathi is a dedicated Delhi-based reporter working in Bhaskar Times. His girlfriend is Malini Chaturvedi (Dev's daughter). Before their engagement, Adi leaves for Pagdandia to take Satyakam's interview. Adi then meets Imlie in a small, funny accident. Imlie helps Adi navigate the village, and they end up staying together in a small hut due to heavy rain and thunderstorms. The villagers find out and force Adi to marry Imlie or else they kill him. Imlie agrees to marry Adi to save his life. Imlie and Adi are forcefully married against their wills. They reach New Delhi and part ways. Adi then discovers that Imlie staying alone is unsafe as the people from Pagdandiya try to take her.

In New Delhi, Imlie introduces herself as a maid to the Tripathi family to save Adi. Adi and Malini marries. Imlie sees her husband marrying Malini, her half-sister with a broken heart. Adi has to go back to Pagdandia for the government's peace meeting with Satyakam and decides to leave her there permanently. Soon Adi realises Imlie is his true love and Malini was just a friend. He also learns that they are half-sisters during his Pagdandia visit.

Adi reveals the truth to Malini—that Imlie is his first wife. Malini goes to Pagdandia with a name Kalpana and discovers that Imlie is her half-sister. Malini then unites Adi and Imlie as she wanted to see them happy and Aditya convinces Satyakam and Meethi to get married. Imlie learns about her father and refuses to accept Dev and tells Satyakam will always be her father. Imlie finally expresses her feelings to Adi. She wants to be a reporter, after seeing Adi's work.

After some time, Malini starts feeling jealous seeing Aditya and Imlie happy. She stops the divorce proceedings and puts on a fake suicide drama, Malini tries to break Aditya and Imlie's relationship. Imlie discovers Malini's intentions and warns Aditya, but he didn't believe her. Malini gets intimate with Aditya by intoxicating him. Imlie is devastated and files a case against Malini for the incident. Malini becomes pregnant. Imlie decides to let Malini stay in the house because she thinks the baby should not live a life like her without her father's name. Malini wants Imlie to leave Adi's life. The Tripathi family slowly accepts Imlie as their daughter-in-law. But Adi and Imlie's relationship is at stake due to trust issues and misunderstandings because of Malini. Finally, Adi and Malini are divorced. Malini shoots herself and frames Imlie, but Satyakam takes the blame and goes. When Aditya shows mistrust Imlie leaves the house.

Aryan Singh Rathore, CEO of Bhaskar times returns to avenge Adi for his brother in law's death, when Adi was just questioning him if he was a fraud, but in the process someone lit the car on fire, while Adi tried to save him. Imlie works with Aryan. Initially rude with Imlie Aryan starts to like her. Aditya jealous of their relationship marries Malini. Aryan marries Imlie. Aditya starts to become rude to Imlie, and goes to Pagdandiya for an interview, but gets caught in a bomb blast trap. Aryan and Imlie try to save him but he is thought to be dead. Imlie and Aryan stay overnight in a hut, and the villagers attack them but is saved by an injured alive Adi. Adi resigns in anger of Imlie with Aryan. He banishes her from the house. Imlie exposes Malini. Aditya seeks forgiveness from Imlie for his mistakes, but she doesn’t forgive him. Aditya comes back to Bhaskar Times while Aryan gives him the low weather section to work in. Aryan and Imlie get kidnapped, and Aryan saves Imlie, and Aryan is about to get hit by the culprit of his brother-in-law’s death, but Adi saves them. Aryan also learn he is innocent. Aditya then leaves for Australia, creating an emotional exit after giving Imlie advice. Malini is imprisoned. Arpita marries Sundar a helper in the Tripathi family. Imlie and Aryan reciprocates their feelings and they consummate their marriage. Imlie gets pregnant.

After many turns of events, Imlie manages to expose Jyoti's misdeeds in front of Aryan with the help of Harinder-Jyoti's ex-husband, Sundar and Arpita. On their way back home, Imlie and Aryan see an abandoned baby and get her home. Malini enters as a successful Dean in a college and reveals to be holding grudges. Malini enters the Rathore mansion and reveals that Gudiya is her and Aditya's daughter who was missing. She accuses Imlie of stealing her baby. Imilie confronts Malini and she reveals that she intentionally abandoned her daughter as she has no love for her child and wants to use her to make Imilie suffer.

Later, Malini manages to harm Imlie in front of Aryan's eyes. Due to that, Imlie suffers from a miscarriage. Aryan and Imlie both blame each other for their loss and part ways. Malini abandoned Gudiya in a temple and Imilie decides to take care of her and she leaves to Pagdandia.

== Cast ==
=== Main ===
- Sumbul Touqeer as Imlie Chaturvedi Singh Rathore: executive reporter at Bhaskar Times; Meethi and Dev's daughter; (2020–2022)
- Fahmaan Khan as Aryaan Singh Rathore: owner and CEO of Rathore Group of companies and Bhaskar Times; Narmada's son; (2021–2022)
- Gashmeer Mahajani / Manasvi Vashist as Aditya Tripathi: Senior reporter at Bhaskar Times; Pankaj and Aparna's son; Imlie Singh Rathore and Malini's ex-husband; (2020–2022)
- Mayuri Deshmukh as Malini Chaturvedi: former professor and Dean of City College; Dev and Anuja's daughter; (2020–2022)
- Megha Chakraborty as Imlie Singh Rathore Rana: Imlie Singh Rathore and Aryan's daughter; (2022–2023)
- Karan Vohra as Atharva "Arto" Rana: DJ and musician; Rudra and Devika's younger son; (2022–2023)
- Seerat Kapoor as Cheeni Tripathi: Aditya and Malini's daughter; (2022–2023)
  - Keva Shefali as child Cheeni Tripathi (2022)
- Adrija Roy as Imlie Rana Pratap Reddy: former bar singer and aspiring chef; Imlie Rana and Atharva's younger daughter; (2023–2024)
  - Purvi Mishra / Ashnoor Kaur Kuckreja as child Imlie Rana (2023)
- Sai Ketan Rao as
  - Agasthya Singh Chaudhary: owner of Chaudhary Sweets; Kunal and Meera's elder son; (2023–2024)
    - Naksh Dhaval Adhyaru as child Agasthya Singh Chaudhary (2023)
  - Senior inspector Surya Pratap Reddy: Kunal and Meera's younger son; (2024)
    - Rivaan Walvekar as child Surya Pratap Reddy (2024)

=== Recurring ===
==== Chaturvedis ====
- Rajoshi Vidyarthi as Janaki Chaturvedi: Dev's mother; (2020-2021)
- Indraneel Bhattacharya as Dev Chaturvedi: Janaki's son; (2020–2022)
- Jyoti Gauba as Anuja "Anu" Chaturvedi: Dev's wife; (2020–2023)

==== Tripathis ====
- Chandresh Singh as Pankaj Tripathi: Harish's brother; (2020–2022)
- Ritu Chaudhary as Aparna Tripathi: Pankaj's wife; (2020–2022)
- Rakesh Maudgal as Harish Tripathi: Pankaj's brother; (2020–2022)
- Vijaylaxmi Singh as Radha Tripathi: Harish's wife; (2020–2022)
- Preet Kaur Nayak as Rupali "Rupi" Tripathi: Radha and Harish's daughter; (2020–2022; 2022—2023)
- Tasheen Shah as Tanushree "Twinkle" Tripathi: Rupali and Pranav's daughter (2020–2021)
- Faisal Sayed as Dhruv Tripathi: Radha and Harish's elder son; Rupali and Nishant's brother; Nidhi's husband; Prashant's father (2020–2021)
- Astha Agarwal as Nidhi Tripathi: Dhruv's wife; Prashant's mother (2020–2021)
- Jared Saville as Prashant "Sunny" Tripathi: Nidhi and Dhruv's son (2020–2021)
- Arham Abbasi as Nishant Tripathi: Radha and Harish's son; Dhruv and Rupali's brother; Pallavi's husband (2020–2022)
- Chandni Bhagwanani as Pallavi Thakur Tripathi: Nishant's wife (2021)

==== Rathores ====
- Neetu Pandey as Narmada Rathore: Aryan and Arpita's mother; Jaggu and Imlie Rana's grandmother (2021–2022)
- Nilima Singh as Neela "Aunty Blue" Rathore: Aryan and Arpita's aunt (2022)
- Resham Prashant as Preeta “Gudiya/Baby Doll” Rathore: Neela's niece; Aryan's childhood friend who wanted Aryan for his wealth (2022)

==== Prasads ====
- Poonam Bhatia as Nanda Prasad: Sundar's mother (2022)
- Gaurav Jain as Sundar Prasad: Tripathi's former househelp; Nanda's son; Arpita's second husband; Jagdeep's father (2020–2023)
- Rajshri Rani as Arpita "Arpi" Rathore Prasad: Narmada's daughter; Aryan's sister; Arvind's widow; Sundar's wife; Jagdeep's mother (2021–2023)
- Riyansh Dabhi as Jagdeep "Jaggu" Prasad: Sundar and Arpita's son; Imlie Rana's cousin (2022)

==== Ranas ====
- Bobby Parvez as Rudra Rana: Manish and Shivani's brother; Devika's husband; Akash, Atharva and Dhairya's father; Karishma and Imlie Pratap Reddy's grandfather (2022–2023)
- Chaitrali Gupte as Devika Rana: Rudra's wife; Akash and Atharva's mother; Dhairya's step-mother; Karishma and Imlie Pratap Reddy's grandmother (2022–2023)
- Jitendra Bohara as Akash Rana: Rudra and Devika's elder son; Atharva's brother; Dhairya's half-brother; Keya's husband (2022–2023)
- Saumya Saraswat as Keya Rana: Akash's wife (2022–2023)
- Zohaib. A. Siddiqui as Dhairya "D/Dheeru" Rana: Rudra and Kala's son; Devika's step-son; Atharva and Akash's half-brother; Imlie Rana's ex-fiancée (2023) (Dead)
- Hemant Thatte as Manish Rana: Rudra and Shivani's brother; Divya's husband; Ginni and Ripu's father (2022—2023)
- Anuradha Singh as Divya Rana: Manish's wife; Ginni and Ripu's mother (2022–2023)
- Sweetu Panjwani as Ginni Rana: Manish and Divya's daughter; Ripu's sister (2022—2023)
- James Ghadge as Ripu Rana: Manish and Divya's son; Ginni's brother (2022-2023)
- Hetal Yadav as Shivani Rana: Rudra and Manish's sister (2022–2023)

==== Chaudharys ====
- Ekktaa Bp Singh as Annapurna Singh Chaudhary: Matriarch of the Chaudhary household; Kunal, Govind and Manno's mother (2023–2024)
- Harsh Vashisht as Kunal Singh Chaudhary: Annapurna's elder son; Govind and Manno's brother; Alka and Meera's husband; Dhanraj, Sonali, Agastya and Surya's father; Ashu's grandfather (2023–2024)
- Renu Chahal Sharma as Alka Singh Chaudhary: Kunal's first widow; Dhanraj and Sonali's mother; Agastya and Surya's step-mother (2023–2024)
- Ghazi Imaan as Dhanraj Singh Chaudhary: Founder and owner of Chaudhary Sweets; Kunal and Alka's son; Meera's step-son; Sonali's brother; Agastya and Surya's half-brother; Karishma's husband; Ashu's father (2023-2024) (Dead)
- Laxmi Kushwaha as Karishma "Kairi" Rana Singh Chaudhary: Imlie Rana and Atharva's elder daughter; Imlie Pratap Reddy's sister; Dhanraj's wife; Ashu's mother (2023-2024) (Dead)
  - Vrihi Kodvara as Child Karishma "Kairi" Rana (2023)
- Gantavya Sharma as Ashu Singh Chaudhary: Karishma and Dhanraj's son (2023–2024)
- Shweta Gautam as Meera Singh Chaudhary: Kunal's second widow; Agastya and Surya's mother; Dhanraj and Sonali's step-mother (2023–2024)
- Asma Badar as Sonali Singh Chaudhary: Kunal and Alka's daughter; Dhanraj's sister; Agasthya and Surya's half-sister; Amrit's ex-wife; Amar's love-interest (2023–2024)
- Mohit Sharma as Govind Singh Chaudhary: Annapurna's younger son; Kunal and Manno's brother; Rajni's husband; Karan and Shivani's father (2023–2024)
- Glory Mohanta as Rajni Singh Chaudhary: Govind's wife; Karan and Shivani's mother (2023–2024)
- Gautam Handa as Karan Singh Chaudhary: Govind and Rajni's son; Shivani's brother; Bulbul's ex-boyfriend (2023–2024)
- Sanjana Solanki as Shivani Chaudhary Singh: Govind and Rajni's daughter; Karan's sister; Avinash's wife (2023–2024)
- Pooja Dixit as Manno Singh Chaudhary: Annapurna's daughter; Kunal and Govind's sister (2023–2024)

==== Reddys ====
- Jaya Bhattacharya as Indira “Lavanya” Pratap Reddy: Matriarch of the Reddy household; Raman's mother (2024)
- Geeta Bisht as Nirmala Pratap Reddy: Malti's mother; Surya's adoptive mother (2024)
- Spreha Chatterjee as Malti Pratap Reddy: Nirmala's daughter; Surya's adoptive sister; Raghu's wife; Anjali's college friend (2024)
- Ajay Kumar Nain as Mahesh Pratap Reddy: Hemlata's husband; Arjun's father (2024)
- Neha Narang as Hemlata Pratap Reddy: Mahesh's wife; Arjun's mother (2024)
- Inderjeet Ishwar Modi as Arjun Pratap Reddy: Hemlata and Mahesh's son (2024)

=== Other recurring cast ===
- Kiran Khoje as Meethi: Dulari's daughter; Satyakam's wife; Dev's ex-lover; Imlie Singh Rathore's mother; (2020–2022; 2023)
- Vijay Singh Parmar as Satyakam: Tribal leader of Pagdandiya; Meethi's husband; (2020–2022; 2023)
- Komal Kushwaha as Imlie's friend (2020)
- Amit Anand Raut as Sanju: Imlie's kidnapper (2020)
- Amarnath Kumar as Balmesh: Aditya's informer (2020)
- Suraj Sonik as Shashank "Shanky": Malini's cousin brother (2020)
- Vishal Sharma as Tripathi's family doctor (2020)
- Karan Thakur as Arvind Shekhawat: Arpita's first husband (2021) (Dead)
- Vishwa Gulati as Kunal Chauhan: A lawyer who liked Malini (2021)
- Naren Kumar as Prakash: Satyakam's adoptive son; Imlie's best friend (2021)
- Sailesh Gulabani as Pranav: Rupali's ex-husband; Tanushree's father (2021)
- Suryansh Mishra as Madhav Tiwari who hails from Imlie's village Pagdandiya; Imlie's cameraman and friend (2022)
- Veer Singh as Uday: Arpita's ex-fiancé (2022)
- Vaibhavi Kapoor as Jyoti Rawat: Aryan's college friend and obsessive lover; Harinder's ex-wife (2022)
- Aamir Khan as Harinder "Harry": Jyoti's ex-husband; a brotherly figure to Nargiz (2022)
- Krishnakant Singh Bundela as Panditji (2020—2023)
- Chirag Mehra as Abhishek Agnihotri: Cheeni's ex-fiancé (2022-2023)
- Deependra Janghel as Aalok Singh: Cheeni's friend (2023)
- Shaan Shashank Mishra as Reyansh: Atharva's childhood friend; she kidnapped Atharva (2023)
- Sanket Choukse as Amrit Shukla: Sonali's ex-husband; Agastya, Surya and Imlie Pratap Reddy's enemy (2023–2024)
- Shubham Goswami as Avinash Singh: Navya and Tej's younger son; Vishwa's brother; Shivani's husband (2023–2024)
- Naresh Kumar as Titu: Karishma and Imlie Reddy's adoptive uncle; Bulbul's father; Pallo's husband (2023–2024)
- Monica Gupta as Pallo: Karishma and Imlie Reddy's adoptive aunt; Bulbul's mother; Titu's wife (2023–2024)
- Mahima Mishra as Bulbul: Pallo and Titu's daughter; Karishma and Imlie Reddy's adoptive cousin; Karan's ex-girlfriend (2023–2024)
- Manu Dabas / Abhishek Sharma as ACP Vishwa Singh: Chaudhary's former enemy; Navya and Tej's elder son; Avinash's brother; Imlie Pratap Reddy's ex-fiancé (2023) / (2023–2024)
  - Krishaan Sagar Thakkar as Child Vishwa Singh (2023)
- Manisha Vora Parekh as Navya Singh: Tej's wife; Vishwa and Avinash's mother; Kunal, Dhanraj, Karishma and Agastya's murderer (2023–2024)
- Raquib Arshad as Bunty: Imlie Reddy's friend and business partner (2023)
- Khushi Misra as Noyonika Johri: Agasthya's ex-fiancée (2023)
- Prakash Ramchandani as Noyonika's father (2023)
- Meenakshi Chugh as Geeta Johri: Noyonika's mother (2023)
- Kalyani Jha as Dolly: Jugnu's former sisterly co-house help in Chaudhary Mansion; Chaudhary's former house helper; Ram's wife (2023–2024)
- Zafar Warsi as Jugnu “Jugs”: Agasthya's right-hand-man and buddy; Chandu's brother; Dolly's former brotherly co-house help in Chaudhary Mansion; Chaudhary's house helper (2023–2024; 2024)
- Gouri Agarwal as Binni aka Rashmi: A thief and con artist; Surya's ex-fiancée (2024)
- Rimjhim as Sneha (2024)
- Abhinav Gautam as Tej Pratap Singh: Owner of Singh Sweets; Navya's husband; Vishwa and Avinash's father (2024)
- Ishika Vishwas as Anjali: Surya's ex-girlfriend; Malti's college friend; Amrit's partner; Imlie's enemy (2024)

=== Guests ===
- Radhika Madan and Sunny Kaushal as Kartika Singh and Joginder Dhillon: To promote Shiddat (2021)
- Harshad Chopda as Dr Abhimanyu Birla: To promote a generation leap in Yeh Rishta Kya Kehlata Hai (2021)
- Ulka Gupta as Banni: To promote Banni Chow Home Delivery (2022)
- Celesti Bairagey as Rajjo: To promote Rajjo (2022)
- Neha Solanki as Titli: To promote Titli (2023)
- Sayli Salunkhe as Vandana Karmarkar: To promote Baatein Kuch Ankahee Si (2023)

== Production ==
=== Development ===
Star Jalsha's Bengali series Ishti Kutum was remade in Hindi language on StarPlus as Mohi by White Horse Productions which aired from 2015 to 2016 which did not garner good viewership. However, by 4 Lions Films, producer Gul Khan remade the series again as Imlie for StarPlus stating, "I know you have heard and seen this before, many times, but we'll play it more real". The first promo of the series was released on 27 October 2020 and featured the leads.

=== Casting ===
Gashmeer Mahajani, playing the lead role of Aditya Kumar Tripathi decided to quit the show in January 2022. He said "My exit was planned two months back. The reasons for the same are best known to me and Gul Khan and I think to maintain our professional integrity, it should remain between only the two of us. It was a two-month long process in which I had to give it the time to stabilize with a new fresh track and gradually reduce my screen space so that once I exit the show, it can still run on its own merit and not get hampered. For the show to run and the new track to sustain after my exit, Aditya has to be completely wrong for Imlie if Aryan has to be completely right. These are basic scripting rules. If I was writing this script, I would have done it the same way. So in the last one and a half month when the decision of my exit was finally made, that is when they made changes in my character and I was okay with it completely. One shouldn't forget that the show-runner is Imlie and she is Sumbul Touqeer. The show runs on her shoulders. "

Manasvi Vashist replaced Mahajani as Aditya but he also quit the show after few months only as he didn't want to be playing a grey role. Sumbul Touqeer who played Imlie, Fahmaan Khan who played Aryan and Mayuri Deshmukh who played Malini, quit the show post generation leap in September 2022.

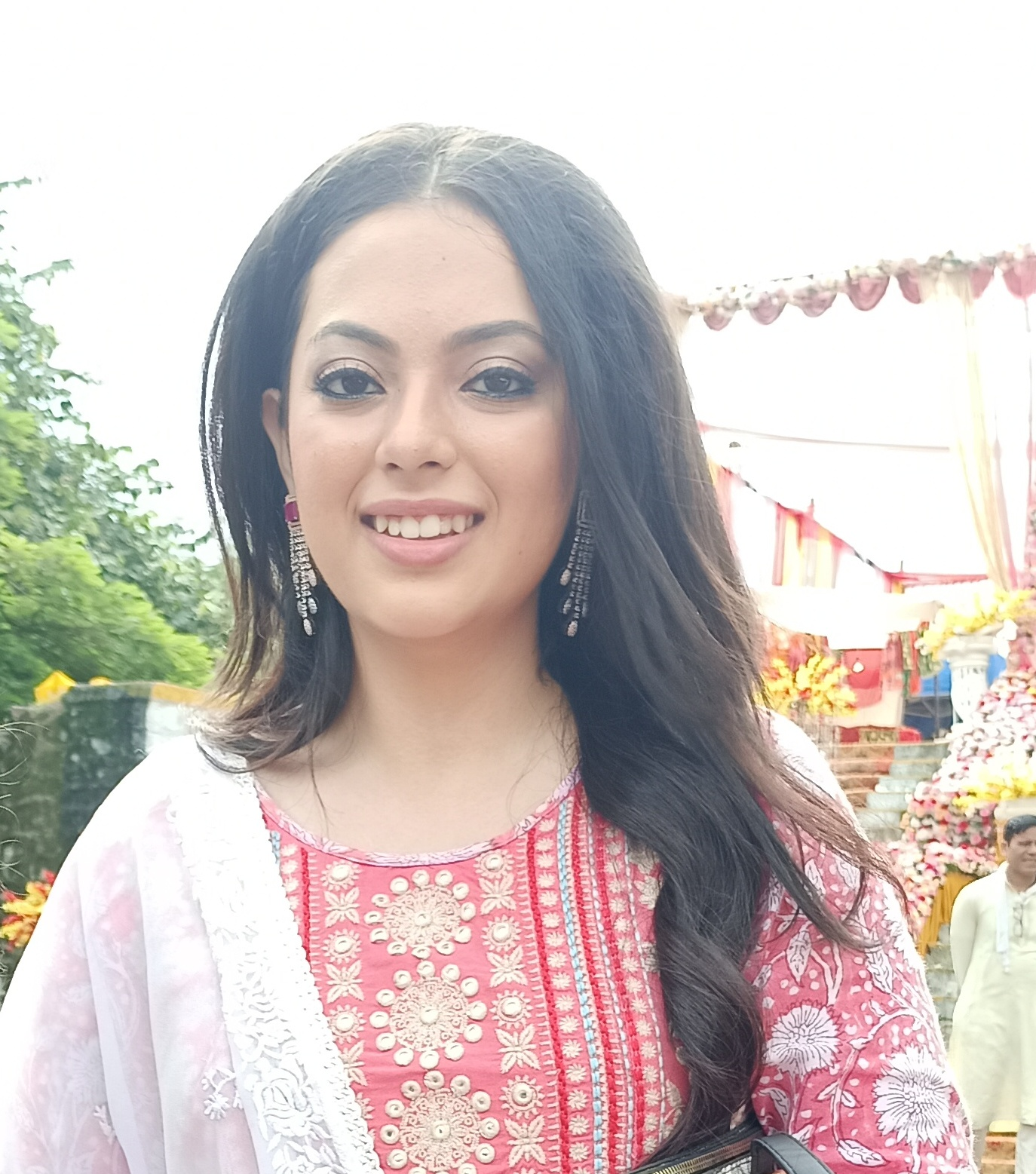
Seerat Kapoor aka Cheeni on sets

Megha Chakraborty was cast as Imlie, the female lead post generation leap and Seerat Kapoor was cast as the negative lead, Cheeni. Karan Vohra was cast as the male lead, Atharva.

On her entrance Chakraborty said, "Imlie has become a huge part of my life already, and I hope the audience will enjoy this new beginning."

In September 2023, Adrija Roy was cast as female lead Imlie, for the third generation and Sai Ketan Rao was cast as playing dual roles, Agasthya after his death track and Surya, the new male lead.

=== Filming ===
The filming of the series began in October 2020. Although the series is set in New Delhi and Uttar Pradesh, it was filmed at sets in Mumbai.

On 14 April 2021, due to COVID regulations imposed by the Chief Minister of Maharashtra, shooting of all serials were asked to halt. Imlie Team moved Ramoji Film City in Hyderabad and conducted their shoot there till the next notice.

== Reception ==
=== Ratings ===
Imlie premiered on November 16, 2020, on StarPlus with an initial Television Rating Point of 2.2 with 5.5 million impressions, entering the top five Hindi fiction shows. Driven by the narrative featuring Sumbul Touqeer, Gashmeer Mahajani, and later Fahmaan Khan, viewership rose to a peak rating of 3.3 TRP with averaging between 7.0 and 7.5 million weekly impressions. During its first two years, the program regularly ranked second or third nationwide, maintaining close ratings competition with the channel's top shows Anupamaa and Ghum Hai Kisikey Pyaar Meiin. In July 2022, the story took a 5-year leap whereas Imlie raising Cheeni as her daughter.

In September 2022, the show introduced a 20-year generation leap, shifting the storyline to characters played by Megha Chakraborty, Karan Vohra, and Seerat Kapoor. Viewership stabilized within a 2.1 to 2.4 TRP range. This rating kept the program in the national top five and secured the network's third-highest viewing metrics during (2022-2023) period and the narrative underwent a 5- year leap in May 2023. Season 2 climb back into charts for the top spot on the Hindi GEC at 1.7 TRP peaking in November 2023, when it overtook Anupamaa in the weekly numbers.

A second 20-year generation leap followed in September 2023, introducing Adrija Roy and Sai Ketan Rao as leads. Ratings subsequently declined to a 1.4 to 1.7 TRP range. The show fell to the top-ten chart rank, hitting an all-time low of 1.2 TRP post Agastya's death, in its final months. Due to the lower ratings, the network ended the daily drama. The final episode aired on May 12, 2024, registering a 1.3 TRP and concluding a three and a half year run of 1,176 episodes. However, the show recorded a stable viewership performance on international satellite markets, including topping the charts on Utsav Plus in the United Kingdom. Star Plus officially concluded the series to make room for Maati Se Bandhi Dor.

== Television special ==
=== Ravivaar With Star Parivaar (2022) ===
The cast of Imlie participated in Ravivaar With Star Parivaar, a musical competition wherein eight StarPlus shows competed against each other to win the title of "Best Parivaar". Imlie emerged as the first runner-up of the show and Sumbul Touqeer aka Imlie won the player of the series award as she was declared as the best performer, most stylish and screened sadasya of the show. She won a brand new car as a prize.

== Adaptations ==
Imlie is an official adaptation of Ishti Kutum. The story of Imlie was originally based on Ishti Kutum till 250 episodes. The second generation story was adapted from the series Milon Tithi. The third generation story was initially inspired from Star Jalsha's show Love Biye Aaj Kal.

== Awards and nominations ==
Year	Award	Category	Recipient	Result	Ref.
2022	Indian Television Academy Awards	Popular Actress (Drama)	Sumbul Touqeer	Nominated	
2022	Indian Television Academy Awards	Popular Actress (Drama)	Mayuri Deshmukh	Nominated	
2022	Indian Television Academy Awards	Popular Actress (Drama)	Megha Chakraborty	Nominated	
2022	Indian Television Academy Awards	Popular Actor (Drama)	Fahmaan Khan	Nominated	
2022	Indian Television Academy Awards	Popular Actor (Drama)	Gashmeer Mahajani	Nominated	
2022	Indian Television Academy Awards	Popular Actor (Drama)	Karan Vohra	Nominated	
2022	Indian Television Academy Awards	Best Serial – Drama	Imlie	Won	
