= List of programs broadcast by Star Maa =

Star Maa is an Indian Telugu language general entertainment private broadcast television network owned by the Disney Star, a subsidiary of an Indian multinational mass media corporation which is in turn owned by American mass media and entertainment conglomerate The Walt Disney Company. This is a list of the current and former programmes broadcast by the channel.

== Current broadcast ==
Premiere date	Series	Adaptation of
26 April 2021	Paape Maa Jeevanajyothi	Bengali TV series Maa....Tomay Chara Ghum Ashena
03 June 2024	Ninnu Kori	Hindi TV series Geet – Hui Sabse Parayi
12 November 2024	Illu Illalu Pillalu	Tamil TV series Pandian Stores 2
24 January 2023	Brahmamudi	Bengali TV series Gaatchora
2 October 2023	Gunde Ninda Gudi Gantalu	Tamil TV series Siragadikka Aasai
25 March 2024	Karthika Deepam II – Idi Nava Vasantham	Tamil TV series Chellamma
10 June 2024	Intinti Ramayanam	Hindi TV series Kahaani Ghar Ghar Kii
2 December 2024	Geetha LL.B	Bengali TV series Geeta LL.B
16 December 2024	Nuvvunte Naa Jathaga	Bengali TV series Khelaghor
22 December 2025	Nuvvu Leka Nenu Lenu	Kannada TV series Ninna Jothe Nanna Kathe
7 July 2025	Nindu Manasulu	
19 January 2026	Varasuralu	
8 December 2025	Podarillu	Tamil TV series Ayyanar Thunai
11 May 2026	Godavari	Tamil TV series Mahanadhi
6 July 2026	Ye Devi Varamo Neevu	Malayalam TV series Mazha Thorum Munpe

== Former broadcast ==
- Ammaku Teliyani Koilamma (2021)
- Ammamma.com (2007–2008)
- Devatha – Anubandhala Alayam (2020–2022)
- Ennenno Janmala Bandham (2021–2023)
- Guppedantha Manasu. (2020–2024)
- Gundeninda Gudigantalu. (2023–2025)
- House of Hungama (2020)
- Intiki Deepam Illalu (2021–2023)
- Satyabhama (2023–2025)
- Intinti Gruhalakshmi (2020–2024)
- Malli Nindu Jabili (2022–2026)
- Maamagaru (2023–2025)
- Radha Madhu (2006–2008)
- Janaki Kalaganaledu (2021–2023)
- Karthika Deepam (2017–2023)
- Kathalo Rajakumari (2018–2020)
- Kongumudi (2016–2017)
- Krishna Mukunda Murari (2022–2024)
- Kumkuma Puvvu (2016–2024)
- Manasichi Choodu (2019–2022)
- Madhura Nagarilo (2023–2024)
- Mounaraagam (2018–2021)
- Nagapanchami (2023–2024)
- Oorvasivo Rakshasivo (2023–2024)
- Paluke Bangaramayenaa (2023–2026)
- Rudramadevi (2021)
- Sasirekha Parinayam (2013–2016)
- Savitramma Gari Abbayi (2019–2021)
- Srimathi Srinivas (2021–2022)
- Vadinamma (2019–2022)

=== Dubbed series ===
- Abhinandana (2012–2013)
- Attarillu (2010–2012)
- Avekallu (2018–2019)
- Chandrakantha (2017)
- Chigurakulalo Chilakamma (2012–2014)
- Chinnari Pellikuthuru (2009–2017)
- Chirugali Vechene (2022–2023)
- Choopulu Kalisina Subhavela (2012–2013)
- CID (2011-2021)
- Daiva Shree Ganpati (2020)
- Eetaram Illalu (2013–2017)
- Geetha Govindam (2018–2019)
- Hara Hara Mahadeva (2012–2015)
- Janaki Ramudu (2016–2017)
- Jin Mayajalam (2020–2021)
- Kaala Bhairava Rahasyam (2018)
- Kodalu Diddina Kapuram (2016–2017)
- Kodala Kodala Koduku Pellama (2012–2018)
- Kundanapu Bomma (2017)
- Maa Inti Mahalakshmi (2016–2017)
- Mahabharatham (2013–2015)
- Mahalo Kokila (2020–2021)
- Manasupalike Mounageetham (2015–2016)
- Manasu Mata Vinadhu (2020–2021)
- Naadhi Aadajanme (2011–2013)
- Om Namah Shivaya (2017)
- Pavitra (2011–2014)
- Premayuddham (2016)
- Pellante Noorella Panta (2012–2016)
- RadhaKrishn (2019–2021)
- Ramayanam (2007–2008, 2020)
- Rukhmini (2007–2009)
- Shree Krishna (2020–2021)
- Sri Subrahmanya Charitham (2018)
- Swamiye Saranam Ayyappa (2007–2008)
- Vasantha Kokila (2010–2012)
- Ye Maaya Chesave (2016–2017)
