= Asianet Television Awards =

Indian Television Awards

- Awarded for: Excellence in Television achievements for Asianet TV serials
- Country: India
- Presented by: Asianet TV Channel
- First award: 2005

The Asianet Television Awards (ATA) is presented by Asianet TV Channel. It is a promotional platform of Asianet's TV shows. Since TV actors and actress' lack a strong society like Association of Malayalam Movie Artists, Asianet conducts functions to token their actors, directors, producers and production houses alternatively.

The awards ceremony was co-sponsored by Lux in the year 2005 which was titled as Asianet Kudumbam awards later Confident Group took up the sponsorship in the next 2 years. Then Ayu:Care, Nirapara, Doublehourse were the title sponsors. The function is normally held in Kozhikode, Palakkad, Kottayam, Angamaly and Thiruvananthapuram cities in Kerala. It was also held thrice in Al Saj Convention centre Trivandrum.

Serials with most awards Swapnam (2005), Sthree2 (2006), Ente Manasaputhri (2008), Autograph (2011), Kumkumapoovu (2012-2013), Parasparam (2014-2018), Vanambadi (2017-2019), Kasthooriman (2018), Santhwanam (2022), Chempaneer Poovu (2024)

Most awards
- Winner(s): Wins
Gayathri Arun; Rekha Ratheesh; Roopa Sree; Sreejith V. J.	6
Vivek Gopan 'Praveen Kadakkavoor'; Archana Suseelan; Kottayam Rashid; Pradeep Panicker; Sajan Surya; Sreejith V. J.	5
Devi S. Kottayam Rasheed	4

== Awards for Serial ==
=== Best Serial ===
Year	Winner
2005	Swapnam
2006	Avicharitham
2008	Ente Manasaputhri
2011	Harichandanam
2012	Kumkumapoovu
2013	Sthreedhanam
2014	Parasparam
2015	Karuthamuthu
2016	Parasparam
2017	Vanambadi
2018	Kasthooriman
2019	Vanambadi
2022	Santhwanam
2024	Chempaneer Poovu
2026	Mazha Thorum Munpe

=== Best Second Serial ===
Year	Winner
2026	Chempaneer Poovu
2026	Patharamattu

=== Most Popular Serial ===
Year	Winner
2008	Swamy Ayyappan
2011	Devimahathyam
2012	Ammakkili
2013	Amma
2014	Sthreedhanam
2015	Chandanamazha
2016	Karuthamuthu
2017	Chandanamazha
2018	Bharya
2019	Neelakkuyil
2022	Kudumbavilakku
2024	Chempaneer Poovu
2026	Mazha Thorum Munpe

=== Long Running Serial ===
Year	Winner
2015	Amma
2026	Mounaragam

== Awards for Actors/Actresses ==
=== Best Actress ===
The Asianet Television Award for Best Female Actor has been awarded since 2005.

Year	Winner	Serial(s)
2005	Praveena and Chippy Renjith	Swapnam and Sthree
2006	Vinaya Prasad	Sthree 2
2008	Sreekala Sasidharan	Ente Manasaputhri
2011	Rasna	Paarijatham
2012	Asha Sarath	Kumkumapoovu
2013	Shelly Kishore Divya Vishwanath	Kumkumapoovu; Sthreedhanam
2014	Rekha Ratheesh	Parasparam
2015	Gayatri Arun	Parasparam
2016	Meghna Vincent	Chandanamazha
2017	Chippy Renjith	Vanambadi
2018	Gayatri Arun	Parasparam
2019	Suchithra Nair	Vanambadi
2022	Chippy Renjith	Santhwanam
2024	Aishwarya Ramsai	Mounaragam
2026	Sreelakshmi	[[Teacheramma (TV series)]]

=== Best Actor ===
The Asianet Television Award for Best Male Actor has been awarded since 2005.

Year	Winner	Serial(s)
2005	Suresh Krishna; Anoop Menon	Swapnam; Megham
2006	Siddique	Sthree 2
2008	Anand Kumar	Nomabarappoovu
2011	Arun Ghosh	Paarijatham
2012	Sajan Surya	Kumkumapoovu
2013	Sajan Surya	Kumkumapoovu
2014	Vivek Gopan	Parasparam
2015	Kishor Satya	Karuthamuthu
2016	Kishor Satya	Karuthamuthu
2017	Sajan Surya	Bharya
2018	Sajan Surya	Bharya
2019	Sreeram Ramachandran	Kasthooriman
2022	Rajeev Parameshwar	Santhwanam
2024	Arun Nair	Chempaneer Poovu
2026	Kishore Peethambaran	Mazha Thorum Munpe

=== Best Popular Actress ===
The Asianet Television Award for Best Actress (Popular) has been awarded since 2011.

Year	Winner	Serial(s)
2011	Praveena	Devimahathyam
2012	Archana Suseelan	Ammakili
2013	Chitra Shenoy	Sthreedhanam
2014	Divya Padmini	Sthreedhanam
2015	Meghna Vincent and Chitra Shenoy	Chandanamazha and Sthreedhanam
2016	Gayatri Arun	Parasparam
2017	Alina Padikkal	Bharya
2018	Darshana Das	Karuthamuthu
2019	Rebecca Santhosh	Kasthooriman
2022	Meera Vasudevan	Kudumbavilakku
2024	Gomathi Priya	Chempaneer Poovu
2026	Surabhi Santhosh	Pavithram

=== Best Popular Actor ===
The Asianet Television Award for Best Actor (Popular) has been awarded since 2008.

Year	Winner	Serial(s)
2008	Kaushik Babu	Swami Ayyappan
2011	Sarath Das	Harichandanam
2012	Shanavas Shanu	Kumkumapoovu
2013	Rajeev Roshan	Sthreedhanam
2014	Sarath Das	Amma
2015	Vivek Gopan	Parasparam
2016	Subramanian Gopalakrishnan	Chandanamazha
2017	Subramanian Gopalakrishnan	Chandanamazha
2018	Sai Kiran	Vanambadi
2019	Sai Kiran	Vanambadi
2022	K. K. Menon	Kudumbavilakku
2024	Arun Nair	Chempaneer Poovu
2026	Sreekanth Sasikumar	Pavithram

=== Best Character Actress ===
The Asianet Television Award for Best Actress (Character) has been awarded since 2005.

Year	Winner	Serial(s)
2005	Srividya	Avicharitham
2006	Vanitha Krishnachandran	Ammamanassu
2008	Sona Nair	Ente Manasaputhri
2011	Sona Nair	Autograph
2012	Mallika Sukumaran	Harichandanam
2013	Sudha Chandran	Ardram
2014	Roopa Sree	Chandanamazha
2015	Roopa Sree Rekha Ratheesh	Chandanamazha; Parasparam
2016	Rekha Ratheesh; Thara Kalyan	Parasparam; Karuthamuthu
2017	Rekha Ratheesh	Parasparam
2018	Praveena	Kasthooriman
2019	Seema G. Nair	Vanambadi
2022	Rekha Ratheesh	Sasneham
2024	Amrutha Nair	Geeta Govindam

=== Best Supporting Artist ===
Year	Winner (Male)	Winner (Female)	Serial(s)
2024	KPAC Shaji	Beena Antony	Chempaneer Poovu and Mounaragam
2026	VK Baiju	Anila Sreekumar	Pavithram
2026	Yadhu Krishnan	Meghna Vincent	Kattathe Kilikkodu and Santhwanam 2

=== Best Character Actor ===
The Asianet Television Award for Best Actor (Character) has been awarded since 2005.

Year	Winner	Serial(s)
2005	G. K. Pillai, Prem Prakash	Megham, Avicharitham
2006	Prakash Paul	Kadamattathu Kathanar
2008	Devan	Swami Ayyappan
2011	T. S. Raju	Kumkumapoovu
2012	T. S. Raju	Kumkumapoovu
2013	Vishnu Prakash	Sthreedhanam
2014	Pradeep Kottayam	Parasparam
2015	Santhosh Kurup	Karuthamuthu
2016	Santhosh Kurup	Karuthamuthu
2017	Pradeep Kottayam	Parasparam
2018	Santhosh Kurup	Karuthamuthu
2019	M. R. Gopakumar	Neelakkuyil
2022	Balaji Sharma	Mounaragam
2024	K. P. A. C. Shaji	Chempaneer Poovu

=== Most Popular Character Artist ===
Year	Winner Female	Winner Male	Serial(s)
2026	Vaishnavi Saikumar	V K Baiju	Mazha Thorum Munpe and Pavithram

=== Best Star Pair ===
The Asianet Television Award for Best Star Pair has been awarded since 2011 later discontinued and reintroduced in 2016.

Year	Winner	Serial(s)
2011	Sarath Das, Sreekala Sasidharan	Amma
2016	Rajeev Roshan, Divya Padmini	Sthreedhanam
2017	Vivek Gopan, Gayathri Arun	Parasparam
2018	Balu Menon, Uma Nair	Vanambadi
2019	Anoop Krishnan, Dhanya Mary Varghese	Seetha Kalyanam
2022	Gopika Anil, Sajin	Santhwanam
2024	Sajan Surya, Binny Sebastian	Geeta Govindam
2026	Nikitha Rajesh, Rahul Suresh	Mazha Thorum Munpe
2026	Rebecca Santhosh, Arun Nair	Chempaneer Poovu

=== Most Popular Star Pair ===
Year	Winner	Serial(s)
2026	Sreekanth Sasikumar, Surabhi Santhosh	Pavithram

=== Best New Face ===
The Asianet Television Award for Best New Face (Male/Female) has been awarded since 2011.

Year	Winner Female	Winner Male	Serial(s)
2011	Shaalin Zoya	Pradeep Chandran	Autograph and Kunjali Marakkar
2012	Shelly Kishore	—N/a	Kumkumapoovu
2013	Dr.Divya	Midhun	Padasaram and Sthreedhanam
2014	Gayathri Arun	Prathish Nanda	Parasparam and Chandanamazha
2015	Premi Viswanath	Richard NJ	Karuthamuthu
2016	Gowri Krishnan and Dilsha Prasannan	Srinish Aravind	Kanakanmani and Pranayam
2017	Aishwarya Midhun	Sai Kiran	Bharya and Vanambadi
2018	Haritha G Nair	Kiran Aravindakshan	Kasthooriman
2019	Snisha Chandran	Nithin Jake Joseph	Neelakkuyil
2022	Sreethu Krishnan and Aishwarya Ramsai	Naleef Gea	Ammayariyathe and Mounaragam
2024	Gomathi Priya	Sathyajith	Chempaneer Poovu and Gouri Shankaram
2026	Tessa Mariya	Kaushik Songster	Kattathe Kilikkoodu and Advocate Anjali

=== Best Performance in a Negative Role ===
The Asianet Television Award for Best Negative Role has been awarded since 2005.

Year	Winner (Female)	Winner (Male)	Serial(s)
2005	Chandra Lakshman	—N/a	Swantham
2006	Chandra Lakshman	—N/a	
2008	Archana Suseelan	Jayan Cherthala	Ente Manasaputhri
2011	Aishwariyaa Bhaskaran	Kishore Peethambaran	Paarijatham and Harichandanam
2012	Ashwathy	Rajesh Hebbar	Kumkumapoovu and Ammakkili
2013	Ashwathy and Sonu Satheesh Kumar	Devendranath	Kumkumapoovu and Sthreedhanam
2014	Kanya Bharathi	Shobi Thilakan	Chandanamazha and Parasparam
2015	Shalu Kurian and Sonu Satheesh Kumar	Jishin Mohan	Chandanamazha, Sthreedhanam and Amma
2016	Archana Suseelan	Naveen Arakkal	Karuthamuthu and Pranayam
2017	Archana Suseelan	Naveen Arakkal	Karuthamuthu and Pranayam
2018	Suchithra Nair	Arun G Raghavan	Vanambadi and Bharya
2019	Roopa Sree	—N/a	Seethakalyanam
2022	Saranya Anand	Subhash	Kudumbavilakku and Ammayariyathe
2024	Soumya	Subhash	Chandrikayilaliyunna Chandrakantham and Janakiyudeyum Abhiyudeyum Veedu
2026	Sajna Noor	Fazil Rihan	Ishtam Mathram and Snehakkoottu
2026	Anjali Hari	—N/a	Chempaneer Poovu

=== Best Performance in a Comical Role ===
The Asianet Television Award for Best Comedian (Male/Female) has been awarded since 2011.

Year	Winner	Serial(s)
2011	Pradeep Prabhakar	
2013	Kottayam Rasheed	Sthreedhanam
2014	Senthil Krishna	Sthreedhanam
2015	Kottayam Rasheed	Sthreedhanam
2015	Kanya Bharati	Chandanamazha
2016	Jayakumar Parameswaran Pillai	Karuthamuthu
2016	Kanya Bharati	Chandanamazha
2017	Senthil Krishna	Vellankalude Naadu
2018	Manoj Guinness	Badai Bungalow
2018	Harisree Martin	Bharya
2019	Pria Menon	Vanambadi
2022	Karthik Prasad	Mounaragam

=== Best Child Artist ===
The Asianet Television Award for Best Child Artist (Male/Female) has been awarded since 2005.

Year	Winner	Serial(s)
2005	Sanusha	Orma
2006	Sanusha	Amma Manassu
2008	Nikitha	
2011	Jeevan and Sandra	Alavudeente Albudhavilakku
2012	Malavika	Amma
2013	Lekshmipriya	Devimahathyam
2014	Sidharth, Biswas Chaitanya, Niranjana, Sebin and Aditya	Balaganapathy
2015	Sidharth	Balaganapathy
2016	Akshara Kishor	Karuthamuthu
2017	Gauri Prakash	Vanambadi
2018	Jelina p	Vanambadi
2019	Gauri Prakash, Jelina p	Vanambadi
2024	Eithal Evana, Aarav Umesh	Malikappuram: Apathbandhavan Ayyappan

=== Life Time Achievement Award ===
The Asianet Television Award for Lifetime Achievement has been awarded since 2012 occasionally.

Year	Winner	Serial(s)
2012	G.K.Pillai	Kumkumapoovu
2014	Valsala Menon	Parasparam
2016	T. R. Omana and Sreelatha Namboothiri	Chandanamazha and Karuthamuthu
2017	K. P. A. C. Lalitha	Under the category Malayalathinte Amma
2018	Raghavan	Kasthooriman
2019	Innocent	
2022	Sreelatha Namboothiri; Murugan Merryland	Paadatha Painkili
2024	Sethu Lakshmi, Suresh Gopi, K. S. Chithra, Jagadish; Mukesh	Mounaragam; Jananayakan; Star Singer; Comedy stars various shows
2026	Roslin	Mazha Thorum Munpe

=== Youth Icon ===
The Asianet Television Award for Youth Icon has been awarded since 2016.

Year	Winner	Serial(s)
2016	Vivek Gopan	Parasparam
2017	Ronson Vincent	Bharya
2018	Sreeram Ramachandran	Kasthooriman
2022	Nikhil Nair	Ammayariyathe

== Technical Awards ==
=== Best Director ===
The Asianet Television Award for Best Director has been awarded since 2005.

Year	Winner	Serial(s)
2005	K. K. Rajeev	Swapnam
2006	K. K. Rajeev	Amma Manassu
2008	Suresh Unnithan	Swami Ayyappan
2011	Sujith Sunder	Autograph
2012	Praveen Kadakkavoor	Kumkumapoovu
2013	Krishnamoorthy	Sthreedhanam
2014	Harrison	Balaganapathy
2015	Praveen Kadakkavoor	Karuthamuthu
2016	Praveen Kadakkavoor	Karuthamuthu
2017	Praveen Kadakkavoor	Karuthamuthu
2018	Harrison	Parasparam
2019	Adithyan	Vanambadi
2022	Aadithyan and Praveen Kadakkavoor	Santhwanam and Ammayariyathe
2024	Unni Pooruruthathi	Chandrikayilaliyunna Chandrakantham
2026	Sunil Kariattukara and Shyju Sukesh	Pavithram and Patharamattu

=== Popular Director ===
Year	Winner	Serial(s)
2026	Binu Vellathooval	Mazha Thorum Munpe

=== Best Screenplay ===
The Asianet Television Award for Best Script has been awarded since 2005

Year	Winner	Serial(s)	Notes
2011	Anil Bass	Autograph	
2012	Pradeep Panicker		
2013	Pradeep Panicker		
2014	Pradeep Panicker		
2015	Pradeep Panicker		
2016	Pradeep Panicker		
2017	J. Pallassery		
2018	Vinu Narayanan		
2019	Pradeep Karuvanthara		
2022	Pradeep Panicker		
2024	Ganesh Olikkara	Etho Janma Kalpanayil	
2026	Joycee	Mazha Thorum Munpe	Original Screenplay
2026	K Gireesh Kumar	Pavithram and Kattathe Kilikkkoodu	Adapted Screenplay

=== Best Videography ===
The Asianet Television Award for Best Cameraman has been awarded since 2005 later renamed as Videography

Year	Winner	Serial(s)
2011	Pushpan	
2012	Hemachandran	
2013	Krishna Kodanadu	
2014	Manoj Kumar	
2015	Hemachandran	
2016	Manoj Kumar	
2017	Vimal	Vanambadi
2018	B. Kumar	Karuthamuthu
2019	Anurag Guna	Kasthooriman; Pournamithinkal
2022	Manoj Kumar	Koodevide
2024	Vaidy	Janakiyudeyum Abhiyudeyum Veedu
2026	Priyadarshan PS	Pavithram
2026	Gessal Sebastian	Mazha Thorum Munpe

=== Best Editor ===
The Asianet Television Award for Best Editor has been awarded since 2011.

Year	Winner	Serial(s)	Ref.
2011	Joby Pannapara	Autograph	
2012	Rajesh Sugunan		
2013	Rohith Roshan		
2014	Rajesh Thrissur		
2015	Lal Kannan		
2016	Rajesh Thrissur		
2017	Rajesh Thrissur	Bharya; Parasparam	
2018	Pradeep Bhagvath	Vanambadi	
2019	Ajayan	Kasthooriman	
2022	Jishnu S. Kuryathi		
2024	Ajith Arinellore	Chempaneer Poovu	
2026	Vishnu Pradeep	Pavithram; Snehakkoottu	

=== Best Audiography ===
The Asianet Television Award for Best Sound Recordist has been awarded since 2011 and later renamed as Audiography.

Year	Winner	Serial(s)
2011	Sreejith V. G.	
2012	Sreejith V. G.	
2013	Aneesh J.	
2014	Sreejith V. G.	
2015	Aneesh J.	
2016	Sreejith V. G.	
2017	Sreejith V. G.	Karuthamuthu
2018	Jeemol Payyappilly	Vezhambal
2019	Aneesh J.	Shabarimala Swami Ayyappan
2022	Sreejith V. G.	Ammayariyathe, Palunk
2024	Jithu S. Prem	Kaathodu Kaathoram
2026	Sreejith V. G.	Santhwanam 2

=== Best Dubbing Artist (Male) ===
The Asianet Television Award for Best Dubbing has been awarded since 2013.

Year	Winner	Serial(s)	Dubbed For
2013	Shobi Thilakan		
2014	Sankar Lal	Parasparam	Vivek Gopan
2016	Sidharth	Chandanamazha	Subramanian
2017	Sankar Lal	Bharya, Parasparam	Ronson Vincent, Vivek Gopan
2018	Sidharth	Bharya, Kasthooriman	Arun G Raghavan, Kiran Aravindakshan
2019	Shobi Thilakan	Vanambadi	Sai Kiran
2022	Sankar Lal	Ammayariyathe, Santhwanam	Nikhil Nair, Sajin T. P.
2024	Sidharth	Chempaneer Poovu	Arun Nair
2026	Sidharth	Chempaneer Poovu	Arun Nair

=== Best Dubbing Artist (Female) ===
The Asianet Television Award for Best Dubbing has been awarded since 2012.

Year	Winner	Serial(s)	Dubbed For
2012	Bhagyalakshmi	Kumkumapoovu	Asha Sarath
2013	Devi S.	Sthreedhanam, Kumkumapoovu	Divya Padmini, Shelly Kishore
2014	Nithuna	Parasparam	Sneha Divakaran
2015	Ambili	Chandanamazha	Kanya Bharathi
2016	Devi S.	Parasparam	Gayatri Arun
2017	Devi S.	Vanambadi; Parasparam; Bharya; Karuthamuthu	Chippy Renjith and Suchitra Nair; Gayathri Arun; Sonu Satheesh Kumar; Renu Soundar
2018	Sera	Vezhambal	
2019	Devi S.	Vanambadi; Kasthooriman	Suchitra Nair; Rebecca Santhosh
2022	Parvathy S. Prakash	Santhwanam; Thoovalsparsham; Ammayariyathe; Padatha Painkili	Gopika Anil; Sandra Babu; Parvathy P Nair; Maneesha Mahesh
2024	Athira Sukumaran	Janakiyudeyum Abhiyudeyum Veedu	Reneesha Rahiman
2026	Devayani	Kattathe Kilikkoodu	Tessa Mariya
2026	Neena Babu	Mounaragam	Aiswarya Ramsai

== Awards for Music ==
=== Best Music Director ===
The Asianet Film Award for Best Music Director has been awarded since 2011 occasionally.

Year	Winner	Serial(s)
2011	Ani Saras	Harichandanam
2013	Saanand George Grace	Kumkumapoovu
2012	Rony Raphel	Kumkumapoovu
2017	M. Jayachandran	Vanambadi
2024	Sreevalsan J. Menon and Saanand George	Etho Janma Kalpanayil

=== Best Lyricist ===
The Asianet Television Award for Best Music Director has been awarded since 2011 occasionally

Year	Winner	Serial(s)
2011	Rajeev Alunkal	Harichandanam
2012	Prayar Geethanandan	Kumkumapoovu
2017	B.K.Harinarayan	Vanambadi

=== Best Playback Singer ===
The Asianet Television Award for Best Singer has been awarded since 2008 occasionally

Year	Winner	Serial(s)
2008	Madhu Balakrishnan	Swami Ayyappan
2011	Madhu Balakrishnan	Devi Mahathmyam
2011	Gayatri Asokan	Harichandanam
2012	Gayatri Asokan	Agniputhri
2017	Shreya Jayadeep	Vanambadi and Vezhambal
