= Start Music =

- Genre: Music competition; Game show; Reality show
- Directed by: Durgadasan RPD
- Presented by: Priyanka Deshpande; Ma Ka Pa Anand
- Country of origin: India
- Original language: Tamil
- No. of seasons: 6
- No. of episodes: 180 (combining of all seasons)

Production
- Production location: Chennai
- Camera setup: Multi-camera
- Running time: approx. 42–50 minutes per episode
- Production company: D Studio

Original release
- Network: Star Vijay
- Release: 26 May 2019 – present

Start Music is a 2019 Indian Tamil-language music competition reality show that airs on Star Vijay, and digitally streams on Disney+ Hotstar. The show has 6 seasons, with Priyanka Deshpande and Ma Ka Pa Anand. The first season premiered on 26 May 2019. The show's latest season will premiere on 15 June 2025.

== Series overview ==
Season	Episodes	Original Broadcast		Host
Season	Episodes	First Aired	Last Aired	Host
1	24	26 May 2019	10 November 2019	Priyanka Deshpande
2	34	16 August 2020	25 April 2021	Priyanka Deshpande
3	26	10 October 2021	17 April 2022	Ma Ka Pa Anand
4	32	26 March 2023	12 November 2023	Priyanka Deshpande
5	28	2 June 2024	22 December 2024	Priyanka Deshpande
6	36	15 June 2025	1 March 2026	Priyanka Deshpande

== Season 1 ==
The first season aired from 26 May 2019 to 10 November 2019 and ended with 24 Episodes. The show was hosted by Priyanka Deshpande.

== Season 2 ==
The second Season of Start Music started on 16 August 2020 and ended with 34 Episodes from 25 April 2021. The show was hosted by Priyanka Deshpande.

== Season 3 ==
The third season aired from 10 October 2021 to 17 April 2022 and ended with 26 Episodes. The show was hosted by Ma Ka Pa Anand. Raja Rani 2 serial won the title of Start Music 3.

== Season 4 ==
Start Music
- No. of episodes: 36

Release
- Original network: Star Vijay
- Original release: 26 March – 12 November 2023
- Presented by: Priyanka Deshpande

Season chronology
- ← Previous; Season 3 Next → Season 5

Fourth season of the Start Music, that launched on 26 March 2023 on Star Vijay and streams on Disney+ Hotstar on every Sunday at 20:00. Priyanka Deshpande has officially once again been appointed as the host for the third time.The show directed by Durgadhasan. The fourth season of the show was ended from 12 November 2023, with 32 Episodes.

The first promo was released on 10 March 2023 with the slogan "Start Music I am very happy". First episode was telecast on 26 March 2023 at 20:00 (IST), replacing Oo Solriya Oo Oohm Solriya Time slot.

=== Episodes ===
Episodes	Airing	Serial	Team		References
1	26 March 2023	Baakiyalakshmi	Reshma Pasupuleti; Divya Ganesh; Vikash Sampath	K. S. Suchitra Shetty; Rithika Tamil Selvi; Meena Sellamuthu	
1	26 March 2023	Baakiyalakshmi	Winner: ₹ 50,000 (Reshma Pasupuleti; Divya Ganesh; Vikash Sampath)		
2	2 April 2023	Cooku with Comali 2 and Cooku with Comali 3	Rakshan; Pavithra Lakshmi; Pugazh	Santhosh Prathap; Shrutika Arjun; Mohamed Kuraishi	
2	2 April 2023	Cooku with Comali 2 and Cooku with Comali 3	Winner: ₹ 1,00,000 (Pugazh; Rakshan; Pavithra Lakshmi)		
3	9 April 2023	40+ Golden Years	Radha; Amudhavanan; TSK	Ambika; Diwakar; Azhar	
3	9 April 2023	40+ Golden Years	Winner Team: -		
4	16 April 2023	Soppana Sundari film Team	SG Charles; Balaji Subbu Vivek; Aishwarya Rajesh; Lakshmi Priyaa Chandramouli	Deepa Shankar; Thendral; Sunil Reddy	
4	16 April 2023	Soppana Sundari film Team	Winner Team: ₹ 60,000 (SG Charles, Balaji, Aishwarya Rajesh, Lakshmi Priyaa)		
5	23 April 2023	Eeramana Rojave 2	Dhiraviam Rajakumaran; Siddharth; Kiru Baji	Swathi Konde; Gabriella Charlton	
5	23 April 2023	Eeramana Rojave 2	Winner Team: ₹ 10,100 (Dhiraviam Rajakumaran, Siddharth, Kiru Baji)		
6	30 April 2023	Ajith Kumar Birthday Special	Jangiri Madhumitha; Mahanadi Shankar; Ramesh Khanna	Vidyullekha Raman; Robo Shankar	
6	30 April 2023	Ajith Kumar Birthday Special	Winner Team: ₹ 10,200 (Madhumitha, Mahanadi Shankar, Ramesh Khanna)		
7	7 May 2023	Romance Special	Vinoth Babu; Sabari; Salmanul Faris	Pvithra; Vaishnavi; Raveena Daha	
7	7 May 2023	Romance Special	Winner Team: ₹ 10,500 (Vinoth Babu, Sabari, Salmanul Faris)		
8	14 May 2023	Chellamma VS Kanne Kalaimaane	Anshitha Akbarsha; Arnaav Amjath; Shriya	Pavithra Aravind; Nanda Gopal; Rashmi Prabhakar	
8	14 May 2023	Chellamma VS Kanne Kalaimaane	Winner Team: ₹ 50,600 (Pavithra Aravind, Nanda Gopal, Rashmi Prabhakar)		
9	21 May 2023	Aaha Kalyanam Mahasangam	Vikram Shri; Vibish Aswanth; Anitha Venkat; Shilpa Mary Teresa	Akshaya Kandamuthan; Bhavya Shri; Ravishankar; Anjali Devi	
9	21 May 2023	Aaha Kalyanam Mahasangam	Winner Team: ₹ 10,100 ( Vikram Shri, Vibish Aswanth, Anitha Venkat, Shilpa Mary Teresa)		
10	28 May 2023	Siragadikka Aasai; Muthu VS Meena Family	Vetri Vasanth; Sri Deva; Salma Arun	Gomathi Priya; Diwakar; Sangeetha	
10	28 May 2023	Siragadikka Aasai; Muthu VS Meena Family	Winner Team:		
11	4 June 2023	Premgi Amaren VS Shiva	Premgi Amaren	Shiva	
11	4 June 2023	Premgi Amaren VS Shiva	Winner Team:		
12	11 June 2023	Bharathi Kannamma 2 Special	Vinusha Devi; VJ Annamalai	Farina Azad; Roopa Sree	
12	11 June 2023	Bharathi Kannamma 2 Special	Winner Team:		
13	18 June 2023	Thara Local	Aishwariyaa Bhaskaran; Sai Gayathri; Singapore Deepan	Vanitha Vijayakumar; Syamantha; Sarath	
13	18 June 2023	Thara Local	Winner Team:		
14	25 June 2023	BB Queens	Maheshwari Chanakyan; Queency Stanly; Shivin Ganesan	Dhanalakshmi; Nivaashiyni Krishnan; Janany Kunaseelan	
14	25 June 2023	BB Queens	Winner Team:		
15	2 July 2023	Mahanadhi; Maharaja VS Maharani	Kamurudin; Rudran Praveen; Ramesh; Sanjay Mohan	Lakshmi Priya; Prathiba; Aadhirai Soundararajan; Sujatha Sivakumar	
15	2 July 2023	Mahanadhi; Maharaja VS Maharani	Winner Team:		
16	9 July 2023	Husband`s VS Wife`s	Deepak Dinkar; Sidhu Sid; Yogeswaram	Sivaranjani; Shreya Anchan; Myna Nandhini	
16	9 July 2023	Husband`s VS Wife`s	Winner Team:		
17	16 July 2023	80`s Star	Nizhalgal Ravi; Suresh; Anand Babu	Kasthuri Shankar; Nalini; Nithya Ravindran	
17	16 July 2023	80`s Star	Winner Team:		
18	23 July 2023	Baba Black Sheep Team			
18	23 July 2023	Baba Black Sheep Team	Winner Team:		
19	30 July 2023	Mamiyar VS Marumagal	Meena vemuri Meera Krishna; Priya	Gabriella Charlton; Nakshatra Nagesh; Syamantha Kiran	
19	30 July 2023	Mamiyar VS Marumagal	Winner Team:		
20	6 August 2023	Kalaiyarkal VS Kanniyarkal	Saravana Vickram; Sameer; Aashish Chakravarthi	VJ Deepika; Ashwini Aanandita; Shobana	
20	6 August 2023	Kalaiyarkal VS Kanniyarkal	Winner Team:		
21	13 August 2023	Cooku with Comali 4	Andreanne Nouyrigat; Tiger Thangadurai; Monisha Blessy	Kishore Rajkumar; Sherin Shringar; Vichithra	
21	13 August 2023	Cooku with Comali 4	Winner Team:		
22	20 August 2023	Cinema`s Appa & Cinema`s Amma	G. Marimuthu; Mohan Raman; R. S. Shivaji	Meera Krishnan; Sathyapriya; Sulakshana	
22	20 August 2023	Cinema`s Appa & Cinema`s Amma	Winner Team:		
23	27 August 2023	Isai Potti	Binni Krishnakumar; Anuradha Sriram; Roshini		
23	27 August 2023	Isai Potti	Winner Team:		

== Season 5 ==
Start Music
- Start Music season 5
- No. of episodes: 28

Release
- Original network: Star Vijay
- Original release: 2 June – 22 December 2024
- Presented by: Priyanka Deshpande

Season chronology
- ← Previous; Season 4 Next → Season 6

Fifth season of the reality show was hosted by Priyanka Deshpande. The show was aired from 2 June 2024 to and 22 December 2024 and ended with 28 episodes. It premiered on Star Vijay and streams on Disney+ Hotstar on every Sunday at 20:00. The show directed by Durgadhasan. The first promo was released on 20 May 2024 with the slogan "The Universe first show". First episode was telecast on Sunday from 2 June 2024 at 20:00 (IST), replacing Anda Ka Kasam 2.

=== Episodes ===
Episodes	Release date	Serial Film Webseries	Team		References
1	2 June 2024		Simran; TSK; Rajavelu	Srikanth; Shobana; Tharsika	
1	2 June 2024		Winner: ₹ 25, 100 (Simran, TSK, Rajavelu)		
2	9 June 2024	Uppu Puli Kaaram; Vs; Heart Beat	Krishna Raghunandhan; Ayesha Zeenath; Ashwini Aanandita; Deepika Venkatachalam	Deepa Balu; Guru Lakshman; Padine Kumar; Yogalakshmi	
2	9 June 2024	Uppu Puli Kaaram; Vs; Heart Beat	Winner: ₹ 100 (Heart Beat Team)		
3	16 June 2024	Maharaja	Mamta Mohandas; Natty Subramaniam; Sachana Namidass	Vijay Sethupathi; Abhirami; Manikandan; Nithilan Saminathan	
3	16 June 2024	Maharaja	Winner: ₹ 1,25,500 (Mamta Mohandas; Natty Subramaniam; Sachana Namidass)		
4	23 June 2024	Pandian Stores 2 Anni; Vs; Anna	Vasanth Vasi; Sharanya Turadi Sundarraj; Akash Premkumar	Shalini; VJ Kathirvel Kandasamy; Hema Rajkumar	
4	23 June 2024	Pandian Stores 2 Anni; Vs; Anna	Winner: ₹ 50,500 (Vasanth Vasi; Sharanya Turadi Sundarraj; Akash Premkumar)		
5	30 June 2024	Siragadikka Aasai; Amma; Vs; Magan	Vetri Vasanth; Pranav Mohan; Preetha Reddy	Anila Sreekumar; Salma Arun; Diwakar	
5	30 June 2024	Siragadikka Aasai; Amma; Vs; Magan	Winner: ₹ 51,000 (Vetri Vasanth; Pranav Mohan; Preetha Reddy)		
6	7 July 2024	Tamil Cinema Stars; Mummies; Vs; Daddies	Uma Padmanabhan; Kalairani; Rama	M. S. Bhaskar; Thalaivasal Vijay; G. Gnanasambandan	
6	7 July 2024	Tamil Cinema Stars; Mummies; Vs; Daddies	Winner: ₹ 25,050 (Thalaivasal Vijay; G. Gnanasambandan; M. S. Bhaskar)		
7	14 July 2024	Aaha Kalyanam; Mamiyar; Vs; Marumagal	Akshaya Kandamuthan; Jairam; Bhavya Shri	Anitha Venkat; Vibish Aswanth; Shilpa Mary Teresa	
7	14 July 2024	Aaha Kalyanam; Mamiyar; Vs; Marumagal	Winner: ₹ 50,000 (Anitha Venkat; Vibish Aswanth; Shilpa Mary Teresa)		
8	21 July 2024	Mazhai Pidikkatha Manithan	Megha Akash; Ramana; Pranithi	Vijay Antony; VJ Sathish; Mahesh Mathew	
8	21 July 2024	Mazhai Pidikkatha Manithan	Winner: ₹ 200 (Vijay Antony; VJ Sathish; Mahesh Mathew)		

== Season 6 ==
The 6th season of the Start Music show, it is premiered on 15 June 2025 on every Sunday at 20:00 and ended from 1 March 2026 with 36 episodes. Priyanka Deshpande has officially once again been appointed as the host.

== Adaptations ==
Language	Title	Original release	Network(s)	No. of. Seasons	Notes
Tamil	Start Music	26 May 2019	Star Vijay	6	Original
Telugu	Start Music	5 August 2019	Star Maa	4	Remake
Malayalam	Start Music Aaradhyam Paadum	10 August 2019	Asianet	5	Remake
Kannada	Gaana Bajaana	9 November 2019	Star Suvarna	3	Remake
Bengali	Start Music	24 November 2019	Star Jalsha	1	Remake
