= Neermathalam =

Indian television series

- Genre: Supernatural horror
- Written by: S Janardhanan
- Directed by: S Janardhanan
- Starring: Rebecca Santhosh
- Composer: Sanjith George
- Country of origin: India
- Original language: Malayalam
- No. of seasons: 1
- No. of episodes: 51

Production
- Cinematography: Alex U. Thomas
- Editor: Pradeep Bhagavath
- Production company: Bhoomichithra

Original release
- Network: Asianet
- Release: 1 May – 7 July 2017

Related
- Chempattu

Neermathalam is a Malayalam-language horror television series directed by S Janardhanan. The show premiered on 1 May 2017 on Asianet. It stars Rebecca Santhosh in the title role. It aired on Asianet and on-demand through Disney+ Hotstar.

== Synopsis ==
The story revolves around a ghost, Gouri (Rebecca), who committed suicide inside the bungalow called Chandrakantham as some people tried to molest during a superstitious ritual.

== Cast ==
- Rebecca Santhosh as Gouri
- Amala Gireesan as Ima
- Stebin Jacob as Anand
- Manju Subhash as Rajeshwari
- Kiran Iyer as Dicruz

== Awards and nominations ==
Year	Award	Category	Nominee(s)	Result	Ref.
2017	Asianet Television Awards	Best New Face (Female)	Rebecca Santhosh	Nominated	
2017	Kerala State Television Awards	Best Actress	Amala Gireesan	Won	
