= Rebecca Santhosh =

Indian actress and entrepreneur (born 1998)

- Santosh in 2026
- Born: 26 July 1998 (age 28); Thrissur, Kerala, India
- Occupations: Actress; Host; Entrepreneur
- Years active: 2011–present
- Spouse: Sreejith Vijayan (m. 2021)

Rebecca Santhosh (born 26 July 1998) is an Indian television actress and entrepreneur who primarily works in Malayalam television serials. She is well known for her role as Kavya in the soap opera Kasthooriman and Revathy in Chempaneer Poovu.

== Early life ==
Rebecca was born on 26 July 1998 in Thrissur, Kerala. Her father, Santhosh, is a businessman, and her mother, Jaya, is a homemaker. She has an elder sister, Geethu. She is a Catholic. She studied at Holy Family Convent School and Chaldean Syrian School in Thrissur. She then pursued a BMS degree from St. Teresa's College, Kochi.

== Career ==
=== Acting ===
Rebecca began her acting career when she was a Grade 4 student through an advertisement. She ventured into mini-screen in 2011 through Kunjikkoonan, a soap opera that premiered on Asianet. She played a lead role, Asin, in the show which revolved around three children eloping during a vacation. In 2012, she portrayed a minor role in Malayalam film Thiruvambadi Thamban.

In 2016, she played the lead role, Anagha, in soap opera Mizhi Randilum, aired on Surya TV. In 2017, she appeared in the horror serial Neermathalam, in which she played Gouri, a ghost. She played a supporting role in the 2017 film Minnaminungu. She rose into fame playing the lead role, Kavya, in the soap opera Kasthooriman which was aired on Asianet from 2017 to 2021.

In 2019, she hosted a musical reality show, Sa Re Ga Ma Pa Keralam, aired on Zee Keralam. From 2021 to 2024, she played the lead role in the soap opera Kaliveedu aired on Surya TV. Since 2024, she has portrayed the lead character in soap opera Chempaneer Poovu airing on Asianet replacing Gomathi Priya.

=== Business Ventures ===
In addition to her acting career, Rebecca is also a successful entrepreneur in the fashion industry. She owns and manages three clothing brands that focus on casual wear, ethnic wear, and Banarasi sarees.

== Personal life ==
Rebecca got engaged to film director Sreejith Vijayan on 14 February 2021. The couple got married on 1 November 2021.

== In the media ==
She was ranked 8th among the Kochi Times 15 Most Desirable Women on Television 2017 by The Times of India. In, 2020 she earned the 2nd spot in same list.

She was ranked 21st among the Kochi Times 25 Most Desirable Women Of 2018 by The Times of India.

== Filmography ==
=== Films ===
Year	Film	Role	Notes	Ref.
2012	Thiruvambadi Thamban	Uncredited	Child artist	
2014	Sapthamashree Thaskaraha	Uncredited		
2017	Take off	Sameera's sister		
2017	Oru Cinemakkaran	Sara's Friend		
2017	Minnaminungu	Charu		
2018	Snehakkoodu	Sneha	Lead role	

=== Television series ===
Year	Show	Role	Channel	Notes	Ref.
2011	Kunjikkoonan	Asin	Asianet	Child artist	
2012	Snehakkoodu		Surya TV	Child artist	
2016	Mizhi Randilum	Dr. Anagha Thirumalpadu	Surya TV		
2017	Neermathalam	Gauri	Asianet		
2017–2021	Kasthooriman	Kavya and Kavitha	Asianet	Dual role	
2019	Neelakkuyil	Kavya	Asianet	Cameo in combined promo	
2020	Avarodoppam Aliyum Achayanum	Kavya	Asianet	Telefilm	
2021–2024	Kaliveedu	Pooja (Anu) and Rani	Surya TV	Dual role	
2022–2024	Bhavana	Pooja	Surya TV	Cameo in promo, Mahasangamam episodes	
2024	Mangalyam Thanthunanena	Pooja	Surya TV	Guest appearance	
2024	Kudumbashree Sharada	Thejaswini	Zee Keralam		
2024–present	Chempaneer Poovu	Revathy	Asianet	Replaced Gomathi Priya	
2025	Janakiyudeyum Abhiyudeyum Veedu	Revathy	Asianet	Cameo appearance	
2026	Advocate Anjali	Revathy	Asianet	Cameo appearance	

==== TV shows ====
Year	Show	Role	Channel	Notes	Ref.
2016	Tharapachakam	Host	Flowers TV		
2017	A Day with a Star (Season 3)	Guest	Kaumudy TV		
2018	Sell Me the Answer	Contestant	Asianet		
2019	Onnum Onnum Moonu	Guest	Mazhavil Manorama		
2019–20	Start Music Aaradhyam Paadum	Contestant	Asianet	Also guest appearance in Season 4 promo	
2019–20	Comedy Stars (Season 2)	Guest/Various roles	Asianet	Also host in grand finale curtain raiser	
2019	Sa Re Ga Ma Pa Keralam	Host	Zee Keralam		
2020–2021	Start Music Season 2	Contestant	Asianet	Also special appearance in promo	
2020–2021	Let's Rock N Roll	Contestant	Zee Keralam		
2020	Changanu Chakkochan	Guest	Asianet		
2021	Red Carpet	Mentor	Amrita TV		
2021	Onamamangam	Guest	Surya TV		
2021	Vishu Dhamaka	Guest	Asianet		
2022-2024	Nattu Midukki	Pooja	Surya TV	Also cameo in promo	
2023	Onamamangam	Guest	Surya TV		
2023	Bzinga Family Festival	Guest	Zee Keralam		
2024	Enkile Ennodu Para	Contestant	Asianet		
2025	Star Singer	Guest	Asianet		
2026	Comedy Cooks	Guest	Asianet		

=== Webseries ===
Year	Series	Role	Platform	Ref.
2020	Pulival Stories	Various Roles	YouTube	
2022	OJO Kanmani	Kanmani	YouTube	
2022	Girls	Nikitha	YouTube	
2024	Premam	Neelima	Pocket FM	

== Awards and nominations ==
Rebecca Santhosh awards and nominations
Awards and nominations
Award	Wins	Nominations

Totals (Note: Certain award groups do not simply award one winner. They acknowledge several different recipients, have runners-up, and have third place. Since this is a specific recognition and is different from losing an award, runner-up mentions are considered wins in this award tally. For simplification and to avoid errors, each award in this list has been presumed to have had a prior nomination.)
- Wins: 6
- Nominations: 4

Year	Ceremony	Work	Role	Category	Result	Ref.
2017	Asianet Television Awards	Neermathalam	Gauri	Best New Face	Nominated	
2018	Asianet Television Awards	Kasthooriman	Kavya	Best Actress	Nominated	
2018	Nimali Chinmayam Awards	Kasthooriman	Kavya	Best New Face	Won	
2018	Jaycee foundation award	Kasthooriman	Kavya	Best Actress	Won	
2019	Asianet Television Awards	Kasthooriman	Kavya	Best Actress	Nominated	
2019	Asianet Television Awards	Kasthooriman	Kavya	Most Popular Actress	Won	
2019	Asianet Television Awards	Kasthooriman	Kavya	Best Star Pair (with Sreeram Ramachandran)	Nominated	
2021	24 Frame Global Excellency Serial Award	Kaliveedu	Pooja	Best Actress	Won	
2022	Manappuram Minnalai Media Award	Kaliveedu	Pooja	Best Actress	Won	
2022	Gramadharavu Excellency Awards	Kaliveedu	Pooja	—N/a	Won	
2026	Asianet Television Awards	Chempaneer Poovu	Revathy	Best Star Pair (with Arun Nair)	Won	
2026	Asianet Television Awards	Chempaneer Poovu	Revathy	Popular Actress	Nominated	
