= Janakiyudeyum Abhiyudeyum Veedu =

2024 Indian Malayalam TV series

- Genre: Family drama
- Based on: Kahaani Ghar Ghar Kii
- Developed by: Kannan Thamarakkulam
- Written by: Murali Nellanad
- Directed by: Niju Soman(Ep:1–48); Gopalan Manoj(Ep:49–260); Santhosh Anand(Ep: 261-358)
- Starring: Reneesha; Raksha Raj; Arathy Sojan
- Theme music composer: Sanand George
- Country of origin: India
- Original language: Malayalam
- No. of seasons: 1
- No. of episodes: 358

Production
- Executive producer: Joseph Cletus
- Production location: Trivandrum
- Cinematography: Vydi
- Editor: Sangeeth Thrippalavoor
- Camera setup: Multiple-camera setup
- Running time: 22 minutes
- Production company: Lime Tree Productions LLP

Original release
- Network: Asianet; Disney+ Hotstar
- Release: 17 June 2024 – 31 October 2025

Janakiyudeyum Abhiyudeyum Veedu (transl. Janaki and Abhi's Home) is an Indian Malayalam-language soap opera directed by Niju Soman. It is an official remake of the Hindi soap opera Kahaani Ghar Ghar Kii. It stars Raneesha, Raksha Raj and Arathy Sojan in lead roles. The show aired from 17 June 2024 to 31 October 2025 on Asianet and OTT platform JioHotstar. The series was launched along with Santhwanam 2.

== Synopsis ==
The story is about Alakapuri family, home of Suryanarayan and Prabhavati, they have four children: Abhiram, Ajay, Amal, and Amrita. As the eldest son, Abhiram holds a significant position in both the Alakapuri household and the Surya Prabha organization. His wife, Janaki, is the eldest daughter in law of the family, maintains unity, peace and happiness of the family. They have a four-year-old daughter, Ponnu.

The family faces challenges when Ajay and Amal get married, and their new wives enter the household.

== Cast ==
- Raksha Raj as Janaki Abhiram
- Yuva Krishna as Abhiram Varma aka 'Abhi'
- Jose ( Promo)/ Anil Mohan (episode 1 to 125)/ Payyannur Murali (126 to 198) as Suryanarayana Varma
- Arathy Sojan as Aparna Thampi : Vishwanathan Thampi and Nirmala's daughter.
- Subhash Menon / Saaju Attingal as Vishwanathan Thampi
- Reneesha Rahiman as Niranjana Unnithan: Hemambika and Adv. Unnithan's daughter.
- Baby Sasha Isla as Ponnu
- Girija Kayalatt as Sumangala
- Mithun M K (EP: 1 — 259)/ Fawaz Zayani (EP:260 — 358) as Ajay
- Souparnika Subhash as Amrita
- Maya Menon as Prabhavathi
- Nihas Khan as Amal
- Boban Alummoodan as Advocate Unnithan Menon
- Krishnapriya as Hemambika menon (Mrs.Unnithan menon)
- Archana Jayakrishnan as Malavika
- Ishani as Honey Rose

Cameo appearances

- Arun Nair as Sachi
- Rebecca Santhosh as Revathy

== Production ==
As part of premiere Yuva Krishna, Raksha Raj and Baby Sasha promoted the TV series on Bigg Boss Malayalam season 6. They entered Bigg Boss House on Day 94, met the contestants and shared the details about the series.

An event titled Tharolsavam, which was the launch event for Janakiyudeyum Abhiyudeyum Veedu and another TV series Santhwanam 2 and the relaunch of Star Singer Season 9, was held at Kannur. The event aired on Asianet on 16 June 2024 a day before the show's launch.

== Reception ==
In the launch week, the show secured fourth position in TRP ratings. As of September 2024, the show got sixth position at 9 pm. Later it was shifted to 9.30 PM where it managed sixth position. From 16 December 2024, it was again shifted to 10.30 PM.

=== Original series ===
The original version Hindi language series, Kahaani Ghar Ghar Kii, was created by Ekta Kapoor under the banner of her production company Balaji Telefilms. The show aired on StarPlus from 16 October 2000 to 9 October 2008, which starred Sakshi Tanwar and Kiran Karmarkar.

16 years after the broadcast of Kahaani Ghar Ghar Kii, Disney Star Network Marathi language channel Star Pravah planned to remake it in Marathi as Gharoghari Matichya Chuli, which started on 18 March 2024. One month later, the Tamil remake Veetuku Veedu Vaasapadi started 22 April 2024., followed by a Kannada remake, Janaki Samsara on Star Suvarna from 6 May 2024. The Telugu and Malayalam remake versions, Intinti Ramayanam and Janakiyudeyum Abhiyudeyum Veedu, respectively started in June the same year.

== Adaptations ==
Language	Title	Original release	Network(s)	Last aired	Notes
Hindi	Kahaani Ghar Ghar Kii कहानी घर घर की	16 October 2000	StarPlus	9 October 2008	Original
Marathi	Gharo Ghari Matichya Chuli घरोघरी मातीच्या चुली	18 March 2024	Star Pravah	Ongoing	Remake
Tamil	Veetuku Veedu Vaasapadi வீட்டுக்கு வீடு வாசப்படி	22 April 2024	Star Vijay	15 February 2025	Remake
Kannada	Janaki Samsara ಜಾನಕಿ ಸಂಸಾರ	6 May 2024	Star Suvarna	21 September 2024	Remake
Telugu	Intinti Ramayanam ఇంటింటి రామాయణం	10 June 2024	Star Maa	Ongoing	Remake
Malayalam	Janakiyudeyum Abhiyudeyum Veedu ജാനകിയുടെയും അഭിയുടെയും വീട്	17 June 2024	Asianet	31 October 2025	Remake
