= Chhatriwali =

Indian Marathi-language TV series

- Genre: Family drama
- Directed by: Swapnil Mahaling
- Starring: See below
- Theme music composer: Nilesh Moharir
- Opening theme: "Chhatriwali" by Bela Shende and Jaydeep Bagwadkar
- Country of origin: India
- Original language: Marathi
- No. of episodes: 389

Production
- Producers: Jitendra Gupta; Mahesh Tagde
- Camera setup: Multi-camera
- Running time: 22 minutes
- Production company: Tell-a-tale media Pvt. Ltd.

Original release
- Network: Star Pravah
- Release: 18 June 2018 – 21 September 2019

Related
- Kasthooriman

Chhatriwali is an Indian Marathi language television series that aired on Star Pravah. It premiered on 18 June 2018 and ended on 21 September 2019. It stars Namrata Pradhan and Sanket Pathak in lead roles. It is an official remake of Malayalam TV series Kasthooriman.

== Plot ==
A perfect take on opposites attract, independent Madhura meets the carefree Vikrant. Hatred soon turns into love when fate intervenes.

== Cast ==
- Sanket Pathak as Vikram Suryakant Gaikwad
- Namrata Pradhan as Madhura Madhav Jamkar/Madhura Vikram Gaikwad
- Sayali Salunkhe as Aakanksha Madhav Jamkar
- Asha Shelar as Surekha Madhav Jamkar
- Ashok Shinde as Suryakant Gaikwad
- Ramesh Deo as Sadanand Kulkarni
- Suparna Shyam as Neelam Kulkarni
- Milind Phatak as Ramakant Gaikwad
- Mrunal Deshpande as Shashikala Ramakant Gaikwad
- Aniruddha Harip as Ajinkya Ramakant Gaikwad
- Pratiksha Mungekar as Amrapali
- Vijay Mishra as Madhav Jamkar
- Jyoti Chandekar as Aaji
- Sukhada Porkar as Meghana Madhav Jamkar
- Sunil Godabole as Aniket's father
- Tushar Sali as Aniket
- Hrishikesh Shelar
- Prajakta Dighe-Kulkarni
- Mayuri Kapadne

=== Guest appearances ===
- Shilpa Shinde
- Rishi Saxena
- Sayali Sanjeev
