= Sadhi Manasa =

2024 Indian Marathi language TV series

- Genre: Drama; Romance
- Starring: See below
- Theme music composer: Nilesh Moharir
- Country of origin: India
- Original language: Marathi
- No. of episodes: 693

Production
- Producers: Hemant Ruprel; Ranjit Thakur
- Camera setup: Multi-camera
- Running time: 22 minutes
- Production company: Frames Production

Original release
- Network: Star Pravah
- Release: 18 March 2024 – 29 March 2026

Related
- Siragadikka Aasai

Sadhi Manasa (transl. Innocent People) is an Indian Marathi language television series that airs on Star Pravah. It stars Akash Nalawade and Shivani Baokar in lead roles. Produced under the banner of Frames Production, it premiered from 18 March 2024 by replacing Kunya Rajachi Ga Tu Rani. It is an official remake of Tamil TV series Siragadikka Aasai.

== Plot ==
Meera, a woman deeply devoted to her family, and Satya, a rebellious young man burdened by a troubled past, live in worlds that couldn't be more different. Meera spends her days tirelessly selling flowers at the temple alongside her family, while Satya numbs his pain with alcohol and violence, frequently clashing with his disapproving mother. Despite their contrasting lives, their paths keep crossing, and each encounter only deepens their mutual dislike.

When Meera's family faces financial hardship and is struck by tragedy as her brother, entangled with the wrong crowd, takes his own life, the situation becomes dire. Guilt-ridden, Satya's father, a retired train conductor, suggests a marriage alliance between Meera and Satya, hoping it might bring stability to their lives. However, on the day of the wedding, chaos ensues when Meera's greedy brother vanishes with the family's savings, leaving Meera with no choice but to marry Satya.

== Cast ==
=== Main ===
- Shivani Baokar as Meera
- Akash Nalawade as Satya

=== Recurring ===
- Supriya Pathare as Nirupa
- Pandharinath Kamble
- Prashant Choudappa
- Sanjivani Samel
- Pankaj Khamkar as Pankaj Gaikwad
- Vaishnavi Karmarkar as Riya Ravi Gaikwad
- Monika Bagul as Devika Pankaj Gaikwad
- Nitish Ghare as Ravi Gaikwad
- Pratibha Gaikwad as Madhu Sanglikar

== Adaptations ==
Language	Title	Original release	Network(s)	Last aired	Notes
Tamil	Siragadikka Aasai சிறகடிக்க ஆசை	23 January 2023	Star Vijay	Ongoing	Original
Telugu	Gunde Ninda Gudi Gantalu గుండెనిండా గుడిగంటలు	2 October 2023	Star Maa	Ongoing	Remake
Kannada	Aase ಆಸೆ	11 December 2023	Star Suvarna	Ongoing	Remake
Malayalam	Chempaneer Poovu ചെമ്പനീർ പൂവ്	29 January 2024	Asianet	Ongoing	Remake
Hindi	Udne Ki Aasha उडने की आशा	12 March 2024	StarPlus	Ongoing	Remake
Marathi	Sadhi Manasa साधी माणसं	18 March 2024	Star Pravah	29 March 2026	Remake
Bengali	Uraan উড়ান	27 May 2024	Star Jalsha	15 March 2025	Remake
