= Gomathi Priya =

Indian actress

- Born: Gomathi Priya Balakumaran; 8 February 1996 (age 30); Madurai, Tamil Nadu
- Occupation: Actress
- Years active: 2018–present
- Known for: Oviya; Hitler Gari Pellam; Siragadikka Aasai; Chempaneer Poovu

Gomathi Priya is an Indian actress who works in the Tamil, Telugu and Malayalam television industries. She made her debut in the Tamil TV series Oviya on Colors Tamil. She is known for playing the lead roles in the TV series Hitler Gari Pellam, Siragadikka Aasai and Chempaneer Poovu.

== Filmography ==
=== Films ===
Year	Film	Role	Language	Notes	Ref.
2020	Varmaa	Deepa	Tamil		

=== Television ===
Year	Show	Role	Language	Channel	Notes	Ref.
2018–2020	Oviya	Oviya	Tamil	Colors Tamil	Replaced by Kushi Sampath Kumar	
2020–2022	Velaikaran	Valli	Tamil	Star Vijay		
2020–2022	Hitler Gari Pellam	Bhanumathi	Telugu	Zee Telugu		
2023–present	Siragadikka Aasai	Meena	Tamil	Star Vijay		
2023–2024	Radhaku Neevera Pranam	Radhika	Telugu	Zee Telugu		
2024	Chempaneer Poovu	Revathi	Malayalam	Asianet	Replaced by Rebecca Santhosh	
2026– present	Ee Puzhayum Kadannu	Kaveri	Malayalam	Asianet		

==== Reality shows ====
Year	Show	Role	Channel	Language	Notes	Ref.
2020	Krishna Krishna	Performer	Zee Telugu	Telugu		
2023	Super Queen	Contestant	Zee Telugu	Telugu		
2023	Asianet Awards	Performer	Asianet	Malayalam		
2023	Kalakka Povathu Yaaru? Champions 4	Guest	Star Vijay	Tamil		
2023	Cooku with Comali season 4	Guest	Star Vijay	Tamil		
2023	Start Music (season 4)	Guest	Star Vijay	Tamil		
2024	Start Music (season 5)	Contestant	Star Vijay	Tamil		
2024	Kirrack Boys Khiladi Girls Season 1	Contestant	Star Maa	Telugu		
2025	Cooku with Jathiratnalu season 1	Contestant	Star Maa	Telugu	WINNER along with Cook Sujitha	
2026	Star Singer season 10	Guest	Asianet	Malayalam		
2026	Cooku with Jathiratnalu season 2	Contestant	Star Maa	Telugu		

== Accolades ==
Year	Award	Language	Category	Show
2020	Zee Telugu Kudumbam Awards	Telugu	Best Chemistry Couple	Hitler Gari Pellam
2021	Zee Telugu Kudumbam Awards	Telugu	Best Entertainer	Hitler Gari Pellam
2023	Zee Telugu Kudumbam Awards	Telugu	Zee Anuragam	Radhaku Neevera Pranam
2024	Vijay Television Awards	Tamil	Best Heroine	Siragadikka Aasai
2024	Asianet Television Awards	Malayalam	Best New Face Female	Chempaneer Poovu
2024	Asianet Television Awards	Malayalam	Popular Actress	Chempaneer Poovu
