= Udne Ki Aasha =

2024 Indian Hindi-language family drama TV series

- Genre: Family drama
- Created by: Rahul Kumar Tewary
- Developed by: Guru Sampath Kumar
- Written by: Dialogues: Yash Kumar Sharda; Gaurav Pagare
- Screenplay by: Vidyabhooshan Tripathi; Mohit Upadhyay; Medha Jadav
- Story by: Radhika Srinivasan
- Directed by: Dharmesh Shah; Rajesh Babbar; Munshi Abdur Rahman
- Creative director: Simran Narula
- Starring: Kanwar Dhillon; Neha Harsora
- Country of origin: India
- Original language: Hindi
- No. of seasons: 1
- No. of episodes: 965

Production
- Producer: Rahul Kumar Tewary
- Cinematography: Dannie; Roshan Lal
- Editor: Gurdeep Singh
- Camera setup: Multi-camera
- Running time: 25–30 minutes
- Production companies: Rolling Tales Production; Vikatan Televistas Pvt Ltd

Original release
- Network: Star Plus
- Release: 12 March 2024 – present

Related
- Siragadikka Aasai

Udne Ki Aasha (transl. Hope to Fly) is an Indian Hindi-language television family drama series that premiered on 12 March 2024 on Star Plus and streams digitally on Disney+ Hotstar. Produced by Rahul Kumar Tewary under the banner of Rolling Tales Productions, it stars Neha Harsora and Kanwar Dhillon in lead roles. It is the Hindi adaptation of Star Vijay's Tamil series Siragadikka Aasai.

== Plot ==
Set against a Marathi backdrop, Udne Ki Aasha revolves around the middle-class lives of Sachin and Sailee as they navigate the complexities of their relationship. It centers on Sailee's struggles as she encounters a roadblock in the form of a resistant husband and her efforts to inspire change, not just for their own growth, but for the betterment of their entire family.

The series follows Sailee Jadhav, a hardworking and ambitious young florist who dreams of becoming a successful businesswoman and lifting her family out of poverty. Following her father, Alok's death and continued harassment by a predatory moneylender, Sudhakar, Sailee is pressured into accepting a marriage proposal from Tejas Deshmukh, the son of a retired automobile driver, named Paresh Deshmukh. But on the day of the wedding, Tejas elopes with ₹27 lakh belonging to his father, leaving Sailee humiliated and stranded.

To save their family reputations, the Jadhavs and Deshmukhs hastily arrange Sailee's marriage to Tejas' younger brother, Sachin Deshmukh, an aggressive, impulsive and hort-tempered taxi driver with a troubled past. The marriage begins on a hostile note, as both Sailee and Sachin share mutual disdain towards each other.

Despite Sailee's shattered dreams, she gradually adapts to her new life, striving to be a supportive wife. Sachin, shaped by years of emotional abuse from his domineering mother, Renuka, remains emotionally distant and cynical about marriage. When Sachin is falsely implicated in an alcohol smuggling case orchestrated by Sudhakar, Sailee along with Sachin's younger brother, Aakash, manages to prove his innocence. Her loyalty softens Sachin's attitude towards her, although their bond suffers again when Sailee conceals Sudhakar's involvement fearing that Sachin's temper could lead to extreme violence, leading to intense confrontations and eventual reconciliation through the consumption of their marriage.

As Tejas returns home after being deceived and losing all of Paresh's money to ex-girlfriend, Esha, Renuka arranges his marriage to Roshni, a fake wealthy woman who secretly hides her past as a widow with a child.

With Sachin's encouragement, Sailee begins pursuing her professional dreams by taking up wedding planning. But misunderstandings resurface when Sachin wrongly believes that Sailee is helping Aakash elope with his enemy's daughter, Riya. In a fit of rage, and blaming her for Paresh's arrest, he expels her from the house, causing her to eventually lose a major business contract. The stress culminates in Paresh's heart attack after Sachin who is intoxicated, accidentally slaps Roshni, when he was actually aiming for Tejas.

Overcome with Paresh's insistence, Sachin brings Sailee back to care for his father. As Sachin starts working multiple jobs to pay off his loans from Paresh's surgery, Sailee acknowledges his efforts and later surprises him by repurchasing his sold taxi. But tension arises again when Renuka humiliates Sailee for not bringing dowry, prompting Sailee to return all her wedding jewelry, including her mangalsutra, vowing to wear it only when Sachin buys it for her himself.

Determined to help Sailee regain her independence, Sachin gifts her a roadside flower stall. Meanwhile, he begins overworking to save money for her mangalsutra, unaware that a stalker has been targeting her. Sailee confronts and publicly shames the man, earning widespread respect for her courage, before Sachin gets the man arrested.

Sailee's younger brother, Dilip who is a thief, becomes a new source of conflict when Sachin breaks his arm after discovering his crimes. Fearing Sailee's heartbreak, Sachin hides the truth from her, leading to friction between them. At their father, Alok's death anniversary, Sachin’s pent-up anger erupts against Dilip, creating a rift in the family. Seeking revenge, Dilip's partner Chitti begins plotting against Sachin.

Despite Sailee and Sachin's differences, they reconcile when he secures a large contract for her business. Sailee successfully completes it with family support and gifts Sachin a new car with her earnings. But Renuka and Roshni later conspire to have Sailee's shop seized by the municipality. In response, Sachin buys her a scooter, calling it her "moving shop".

A fabricated video later surfaces showing Sachin allegedly drunk, leading to another misunderstanding between the couple. Sailee eventually uncovers that the video was fake, clears Sachin's name and encourages him to publicly expose the truth. But the controversy damages Sachin's work prospects.

Meanwhile, despite Sachin and Tejas' long-standing rivalry, he helps Tejas set up a business. Tejas continues to resent him, ignoring that Sachin once served time in juvenile detention for a crime the former had committed and therefore, has continued to suffer Renuka's wrath. Paresh's silence about the truth had condemned Sachin to years of stigma and maternal hatred.

When Sachin's old acquaintance, Ranjit reenters his life and manipulates him into old habits, Sailee grows suspicious. Her warnings are dismissed and the resulting tension drives Sachin back to alcohol. When Ranjit later frames Aakash for theft and absconds, Sachin realizes his mistake, helps police capture him and confides in Sailee about his painful past. Overwhelmed, Sailee pledges to keep his secret and continue supporting him.

In a subsequent arc, Sailee and Sachin stage a public act of domestic conflict to help Dilip retain his college admission by portraying him as a struggling student. Dilip later redeems himself and apologizes to Sachin. Sailee's respect for her husband deepens as she begins viewing him as a protector figure equivalent to that of her late father, Alok.

Sailees honesty is tested more when she refuses a dishonest decoration deal offered by a local MLA. With help from Sachin and her own cleverness and ability to find solutions she manages to get the job in a way.

Tejas and Roshni recover the stolen ₹27 lakh from Tejas's ex-girlfriend, Esha and attempt to invest it in an expensive property, unaware that they are being drawn into another scam.

== Cast ==
=== Main ===
- Neha Harsora as Sailee Jadhav Deshmukh: An honest florist; Shobha and Alok's elder daughter (2024–present)
- Kanwar Dhillon as Sachin "Sachya" Deshmukh: An aggressive and honest taxi driver; Paresh and Renuka's second son (2024–present)

=== Recurring ===
- Shama Deshpande as Savitri Deshmukh: Paresh's mother; Tejas, Sachin and Akash's grandmother; Lakshya and Arya's great-grandmother (2024–present)
- Sanjay Narvekar as Paresh Deshmukh: An honest retired locomotive pilot and the former owner of Renuka Home Gadgets; Savitri's son (2024–present)
- Radhika Vidyasagar/Sonali Naik as Renuka "Renu" Deshmukh: Paresh's wife (2024–2026)/(2026-present)
- Puru Chibber as Tejas Deshmukh: A professor and the former manager and the former owner of Renuka Home Gadgets; Paresh and Renuka's eldest son; (2024–present)
- Tanvi Shewale as Kalyani "Roshani" Deshmukh: A makeup artist and the former owner of Renuka's Beauty World; Supriya's daughter (2024–present)
- Devashish Chandiramani as Akash Deshmukh: An honest chef; Paresh and Renuka's youngest son (2024–present)
- Vaishali Arora as Riya Deshmukh: A businesswoman and a former dubbing artist; Mamta and Joy's daughter (2024–present)
- Oziel Jiwani as Arya Deshmukh: Riya and Akash's son (2026–present)
- Abaan Khan as Lakshya "Laksh" Deshmukh: Sachin and Sailee's son; Kalyani and Tejas's unofficial foster son (2026–present)
- Priyanshi Rai as Pankhuri "Pankhu" Deshmukh: Juhi and Arun's daughter; Sachin and Sailee's foster daughter (2026–present)
- Sneha Raikar/Unknown as Shobha Jadhav: An honest florist; Alok's widow; Sailee, Juhi and Dilip's mother (2024–2025)/(2026)
- Ravi Mahashabde as Alok Jadhav: Shobha's late husband; Sailee, Juhi and Dilip's father (2024)
- Pari Bhatti/Rachel Babbar/Tannu Upadhyay as Juhi Jadhav: Shobha and Alok's younger daughter; Sailee and Dilip's sister; Akash's friend; Arun's estranged late wife; Pankhuri's mother (2024–2025)/(2025–2026)/(2026)
- Sahil Balani as Dilip "Baadu" Jadhav: Shobha and Alok's son; Sailee and Juhi's brother (2024–2026)
- Hemant Choudhary as Joy Banerjee: Mamta's husband; Riya's father; Paresh's former employer (2024–2026)
- Simran Gangwani/Ginnie Virdi/Jaswinder Gardner as Mamta Banerjee: Joy's wife; Riya's mother (2024–2025)/(2025)/(2025–2026)
- Smita Sinkar Shah as Shakuntala "Shaku"; Renuka's best friend (2024–present)
- Rohit Gill as Police Inspector (2024-2025)
- Vikash Tiwari as Anish "Anya": An honest taxi driver; Sachin's best friend (2024–present)
- Anuja Lokre as Supriya: Kalyani's mother; Krish's grandmother (2024–2026)
- Shivam Parmar as Krish: Kalyani and Satish's son (2026–present)
  - Saarth Kumar as child Krish (2024–2026)
- Navdeep Gujjar as Sudhakar: A loan shark; Sailee's one-sided obsessive love interest, stalker and enemy; Sachin's enemy (2024)
- Ishita Dixit as Vidya: Kalyani's best friend (2024)
- Deeksha Suryawanshi as Shikha: Kalyani's best friend; Anant's wife (2024–2026)
- Akash Aggarwal as Kishore: Paresh's best friend; Sushma's husband; Bhavana's father (2024–present)
- Abhaykant Mishra as Chitti: A businessman and former criminal and loan shark; Dilip's former boss; Minty's husband; Kittu's father; Sachin and Sailee's enemy (2024–present)
- Afreen Alvi/Anshu Zarbade as Esha: Tejas'ex-girlfriend (2024)/(2025)
- Rajkumar Kanojia as Shining "Kiran" Sultan: A butcher and a meat shop owner; Kalyani's fake uncle (2024–2026)
- Krissann Barretto as Sonali: A hotel manager (2025)
- Tasneem Sheikh as Pari: Renuka's friend (2025)
- Pankaj Avadhesh Shukla as Chandu: Sailee's stalker (2025)
- Ajay Chaudhary as Ranjeet: A thief; Sachin's ex-friend and enemy (2025)
- Mohammad Nazim as Vikas "Sanam Ji" Singhania: An honest actor and a businessman (2025)
- Shrashti Maheshwari as Sheetal: Vikas's assistant, ex-love interest and enemy (2025)
- Ajay Raju as Drunk Man (2025)
- Saundarya as Manjiri: Deshmukh family's former maid (2025; 2026)
- Guddi Maruti as Mandira Singh: A dishonest decorator and florist; Sailee's enemy (2025–2026)
- Krip Suri as Arun: A dishonest additional district magistrate and a former traffic police officer; Saraswati's son; Juhi's abusive widower; Pankhuri's father; Sachin's enemy (2025–2026)
- Nandini Thakur as Saraswati: Arun's mother; Pankhuri's grandmother (2025–2026)
- Anushka Bajpayee as Neetu: An honest businesswoman; Akash's former boss and former one-sided love interest (2025–2026)
- Hemant Bharti as Anant: Sailee's former one-sided love interest; Sachin's friend; Shikha's husband (2025, 2026)
- Himanshi Parashar as Simran (2026)
- Kapil Kumar as A financer: Tejas' enemy (2026)
- Pankti Patel as Kanika: Devika's daughter; Tejas's student and one sided love interest (2026–present)
- Shweta Gautam as Devika: A principal; Kanika's mother (2026–present)
- Prachee Pathak as Philomena: A former nurse; Kalyani's blackmailer (2026)
- Shiny Dixit as Minty: Chitti's wife; Kittu's mother (2026–present)
- Sarthak Dayma as Kittu: Minty and Chitti's son (2026–present)

=== Guest appearances ===
- Bhavika Sharma as Savi Chavan Thakkar from Ghum Hai Kisikey Pyaar Meiin (2024)
- Shakti Arora as Dr. Ishaan Bhosale from Ghum Hai Kisikey Pyaar Meiin (2024)
- Hitesh Bharadwaj as Rajat Thakkar from Ghum Hai Kisikey Pyaar Meiin (2024)
- Nakuul Mehta as Himself (2024)
- Rohit Purohit as Advocate Armaan Poddar from Yeh Rishta Kya Kehlata Hai (2025; 2026)
- Akshit Sukhija as Dr. Chirag Mittal from Dil Ko Tumse Pyaar Hua (2024)
- Rutuja Bagwe as Vaijayanti from Maati Se Bandhi Dor (2024)
- Neil Bhatt as Shiv Prasad Deshmukh from Mr. and Mrs. Parshuram (2026)
- Shambhavi Singh as Shalini Dixit Deshmukh from Mr. and Mrs. Parshuram (2026)
- Samridhii Shukla as Advocate Abhira Sharma Poddar from Yeh Rishta Kya Kehlata Hai (2026)
- Ishhan Dhawan as Jeet Saxena from Yeh Fitoor Tera (2026)
- Adrija Roy as Rahi Kapadia Kothari from Anupamaa (2026)

== Production ==
=== Development ===
The concept was developed in December 2023, and the first promo was released in February 2024.

The series underwear a 7–year leap in July 2026, after Roshni's motives were unmasked.

=== Casting ===
In January 2024, Neha Harsora was cast to play the female lead, while Kanwar Dhillon was cast as the male lead. Tanvi Shewale is seen portraying the negative lead, Roshni. Puru Chibber was cast as Tejas Deshmukh. Vaishali Arora joined the cast as Riya Deshmukh. Guddi Maruti and Krip Kapur Suri were cast in grey shaded characters in 2025. Ajay Singh Chaudhary joined the cast as Ranjit in July 2025 while Mohammad Nazim came into the show in October.

Amid surrounding the rumours of going off air around April 2026 post IPL 2026, the show took a 7-year leap in July 2026. Radhika Vidyasagar who portrayed Renuka quit the series and was replaced by Sonali Naik. Abaan Khan was cast as Lakshya. Pankti Patel also joined the show. In September, Prachee Patak entered the show as Philomena.

=== Ratings ===
The show entered the list of the top five most rated shows of BARC in its opening week. In week 47, it was one of the top 3 shows. Since week 48, the show is consistently in competition with Anupamaa to occupy the top spot.

Week	Year	BARC Viewership		Ref.
Week	Year	TRP	Ranking	Ref.
Week 1	2025	2.2	1	
Week 2	2025	2.1	1	
Week 3	2025	2.0	2	
Week 7	2025	2.2	1	
Week 9	2025	2.3	1	
Week 16	2025	2.3	1	
Week 17	2025	2.4	1	
Week 18	2025	2.4	1	
Week 19	2025	2.2	2	

=== Crossover ===
On 23 March 2026, Udne Ki Aasha aired a one-hour special episode called, Deshmukh Vs Deshmukh Mahasangam with Mr. and Mrs. Parshuram, wherein Sachin got to know about Shivprasad's dual identity as Parshuram and they both keep it hidden from Sailee and Shalini.

== Adaptations ==
Language	Title	Original release	Network(s)	Last aired	Notes
Tamil	Siragadikka Aasai சிறகடிக்க ஆசை	23 January 2023	Star Vijay	Ongoing	Original
Telugu	Gunde Ninda Gudi Gantalu గుండెనిండా గుడిగంటలు	2 October 2023	Star Maa	Ongoing	Remake
Kannada	Aase ಆಸೆ	11 December 2023	Star Suvarna	Ongoing	Remake
Malayalam	Chempaneer Poovu ചെമ്പനീർ പൂവ്	29 January 2024	Asianet	Ongoing	Remake
Hindi	Udne Ki Aasha उडने की आशा	12 March 2024	StarPlus	Ongoing	Remake
Marathi	Sadhi Manasa साधी माणसं	18 March 2024	Star Pravah	29 March 2026	Remake
Bengali	Uraan উড়ান	27 May 2024	Star Jalsha	15 March 2025	Remake

== Awards and nominations ==
Year	Award	Category	Nominee	Result	Ref
2024	Indian Television Academy Awards	Best Serial	Udne Ki Aasha	Won	
2024	Indian Television Academy Awards	Best Actress (Drama)	Neha Harsora	Won	
2024	Indian Television Academy Awards	Best Actor (Drama)	Kanwar Dhillon	Nominated	
2024	Indian Television Academy Awards	Best Actor in a Supporting Role	Sanjay Narvekar	Won	
2024	Indian Television Academy Awards	Best Actress in a Negative Role	Radhika Vidyasagar	Nominated	
2024	Indian Television Academy Awards	Best Dialogue (Drama)	Yash Kumar Sharda	Won	
2024	Indian Television Academy Awards	Best Story	Radhika Srinivasan	Won	
2024	Indian Television Academy Awards	Best Teleplay	Medha Jadhav	Won	
2025	Indian Telly Awards	Best Actor in a Lead Role	Kanwar Dhillon	Won	
2025	Indian Telly Awards	Best Actor in a Supporting Role	Sanjay Narvekar	Nominated	
2025	Indian Telly Awards	Best Actress in a Negative Role/Fan Favourite Negative Actress	Radhika Vidyasagar	Nominated	
2025	Indian Telly Awards	Best Drama Series	Udne Ki Aasha	Won	
2025	Indian Telly Awards	Best Onscreen Couple	Kanwar Dhillon & Neha Harsora	Won	
2025	Indian Telly Awards	Fan Favorite Actress	Neha Harsora	Nominated	
2025	Indian Telly Awards	Fan Favourite Supporting Actor	Sanjay Narvekar	Won	
2025	Indian Telly Awards	Editor's Choice: Best Actor in a Supporting Role	Puru Chhiber	Won	
2025	Indian Telly Awards	Best TV Cameraman (Fiction)	Dannie	Won	
2025	Indian Telly Awards	Best Showrunner	Rahul Tewary, Srinivasan B./ Radhika Srinivasan	Won	
