= Start Music Aaradhyam Paadum =

Indian-Malayalam Game show

- Genre: Game show
- Presented by: Arya; Dharmajan Bolgatty; Anoop Krishnan; Suchithra Nair
- Country of origin: India
- Original language: Malayalam
- No. of seasons: 5
- No. of episodes: 170

Production
- Production locations: Kakkanad; Kollam; Trivandrum
- Camera setup: Multi-camera

Original release
- Network: Asianet
- Release: 10 August 2019 – 27 November 2023

Start Music Aaradhyam Paadum is an Indian Malayalam-language musical game show. It aired from 10 August 2019 to 2 November 2023 in Asianet and also streams digitally on Disney+ Hotstar. The show aired five seasons. It is an adaptation of Tamil reality show Start Music.

== Concept ==
Start Music Aaradhyam Paadum is a game show based on music. Every week, 8 celebrities face questions and tasks about the music and win prizes. They are divided into two teams, consisting of four members in each one. There are four rounds of games in this show – "Iswaryathinte siran", "Engile Ennodupara", "Ippo sheriyakkitharam" and "Lelu Allu Lelu Allu Lelu Allu".

== Series overview ==
Season	Episodes	Original Broadcast		Host(s)
Season	Episodes	First aired	Last aired	Host(s)
1	43	10 August 2019	4 January 2020	Arya
2	24	14 November 2020	7 February 2021	Arya, Dharmajan Bolgatty
3	39	27 August 2021	26 December 2021	Anoop Krishnan, Suchithra Nair
4	37	25 June 2022	26 November 2022	Arya, Anoop Krishnan
5	27	13 August 2023	26 November 2023	Arya, Anoop Krishnan

== List of episodes ==
=== Season 1 ===
No.	Title	Date of Broadcast	Notes	Ref.
1	Team Vanambadi vs Team Seetha Kalyanam	10 August 2019		
2	Team Vanambadi vs Team Seetha Kalyanam	11 August 2019		
3	Team Vanambadi vs Team Seetha Kalyanam	17 August 2019		
4	Team Vanambadi vs Team Seetha Kalyanam	18 August 2019		
5	Team Neelakkuyil vs Team Karuthamuthu	24 August 2019		
6	Team Neelakkuyil vs Team Karuthamuthu	25 August 2019		
7	Team Neelakkuyil vs Team Karuthamuthu	31 August 2019		
8	Team Neelakkuyil vs Team Karuthamuthu	1 September 2019		
9	Team Pulikkuttikal vs Team Poothumbikal	7 September 2019	Onam special episodes	
10	Team Pulikkuttikal vs Team Poothumbikal	8 September 2019	Onam special episodes	
11	Team Pulikkuttikal vs Team Poothumbikal	14 September 2019		
12	Team Pulikkuttikal vs Team Poothumbikal	15 September 2019		
13	Team Swami Ayyappan vs Team Kasthooriman	21 September 2019		
14	Team Swami Ayyappan vs Team Kasthooriman	22 September 2019		
15	Team Swami Ayyappan vs Team Kasthooriman	28 September 2019		
16	Team Swami Ayyappan vs Team Kasthooriman	29 September 2019		
17	Team Kasthooriman vs Team Pournamithinkal	5 October 2019		
18	Team Kasthooriman vs Team Pournamithinkal	6 October 2019		
19	Team Kasthooriman vs Team Pournamithinkal	12 October 2019		
20	Team Kasthooriman vs Team Pournamithinkal	13 October 2019		
21	Team Thekkekkara vs Team Vadakkekkara	19 October 2019		
22	Team Thekkekkara vs Team Vadakkekkara	20 October 2019		
23	Team Thekkekkara vs Team Vadakkekkara	26 October 2019		
24	Team Thekkekkara vs Team Vadakkekkara	27 October 2019		
25	Team Kidilan vs Team Vanambadi	2 November 2019	Celebrating 25 episodes mark	
26	Team Kidilan vs Team Vanambadi	3 November 2019	Celebrating 25 episodes mark	
27	Team Pournamithinkal vs Team Neelakkuyil	9 November 2019		
28	Team Pournamithinkal vs Team Neelakkuyil	10 November 2019		
29	Team Kasthooriman vs Team Seetha Kalyanam	22 November 2019		
30	Team Kasthooriman vs Team Seetha Kalyanam	23 November 2019		
31	Team Neelakkuyil vs Team Vanambadi	29 November 2019		
32	Team Neelakkuyil vs Team Vanambadi	30 November 2019		
33	Team Kudukkachi vs Team Jagajilli	6 December 2019		
34	Team Kudukkachi vs Team Jagajilli	7 December 2019		
35	Team Rowdy Baby vs Team Kidoos	13 December 2019		
36	Team Rowdy Baby vs Team Kidoos	14 December 2019		
37	Team Vanambadi vs Team Kasthooriman	20 December 2019		
38	Team Vanambadi vs Team Kasthooriman	21 December 2019		
39	Team Vanambadi vs Team Kasthooriman	25 December 2019	Christmas special episode	
40	Team Neelakkuyil vs Team Seetha Kalyanam	27 December 2019		
41	Team Neelakkuyil vs Team Seetha Kalyanam	28 December 2019		
42	Team Dons vs Team Gymmans	3 January 2020		
43	Team Dons vs Team Gymmans	4 January 2020		

=== Season 2 ===
No.	Title	Date of Broadcast	Notes
1	Team Vanambadi vs Team Seetha Kalyanam	14 November 2020	
2	Team Vanambadi vs Team Seetha Kalyanam	15 November 2020	
3	Team Kasthooriman vs Team Pournamithinkal	21 November 2020	
4	Team Kasthooriman vs Team Pournamithinkal	22 November 2020	
5	Team Paadatha Painkili vs Team Kudumbavilakku	28 November 2020	
6	Team Paadatha Painkili vs Team Kudumbavilakku	29 November 2020	
7	Team Paadatha Painkili vs Team Kudumbavilakku	5 December 2020	
8	Team Paadatha Painkili vs Team Kudumbavilakku	6 December 2020	
9	Team Rockstars vs Team Music Stars	12 December 2020	Former contestants of Star Singer
10	Team Rockstars vs Team Music Stars	13 December 2020	Former contestants of Star Singer
11	Team Kudumbavilakku vs Team Kasthooriman	23 December 2020	
12	Team Kudumbavilakku vs Team Kasthooriman	24 December 2020	
13	Team Mounaragam vs Team Seetha Kalyanam	26 December 2020	
14	Team Mounaragam vs Team Seetha Kalyanam	2 January 2021	
15	Team Paadatha Painkili vs Team Ammayariyathe	9 January 2021	
16	Team Paadatha Painkili vs Team Ammayariyathe	10 January 2021	
17	Team Paadatha Painkili vs Team Ammayariyathe	16 January 2021	
18	Team Paadatha Painkili vs Team Ammayariyathe	17 January 2021	
19	Team Kasthooriman vs Team Mounaragam	23 January 2021	
20	Team Kasthooriman vs Team Mounaragam	24 January 2021	
21	Team Kasthooriman vs Team Mounaragam	30 January 2021	
22	Team Kasthooriman vs Team Mounaragam	31 January 2021	
23	Bigg Stars and Boss Stars	6 February 2021	
24	Bigg Stars and Boss Stars	7 February 2021	

=== Season 3 ===
No.	Title	Date of Broadcast	Notes	Ref.
1	Team Koodevide vs Team Kudumbavilakku	27 August 2021	Guest appearance from Prayaga Martin	
2	Team Koodevide vs Team Kudumbavilakku	28 August 2021		
3	Team Koodevide vs Team Kudumbavilakku	29 August 2021		
4	Team Mounaragam vs Team Seetha Kalyanam	4 September 2021		
5	Team Mounaragam vs Team Seetha Kalyanam	5 September 2021		
6	Team Bigg Stars vs Team Boss Stars	11 September 2021	Contestants of Bigg Boss (Malayalam season 3)	
7	Team Bigg Stars vs Team Boss Stars	12 September 2021	Contestants of Bigg Boss (Malayalam season 3)	
8	Team Paadatha Painkili vs Team Ammayariyathe	18 September 2021		
9	Team Paadatha Painkili vs Team Ammayariyathe	19 September 2021		
10	Team Paadatha Painkili vs Team Ammayariyathe	25 September 2021		
11	Team Paadatha Painkili vs Team Ammayariyathe	26 September 2021		
12	Team Balahanuman vs Team Koodevide	2 October 2021		
13	Team Balahanuman vs Team Koodevide	3 October 2021		
14	Team Thoovalsparsham vs Team Sasneham	9 October 2021		
15	Team Thoovalsparsham vs Team Sasneham	10 October 2021		
16	Team Mounaragam vs Team Kudumbavilakku	16 October 2021		
17	Team Mounaragam vs Team Kudumbavilakku	17 October 2021		
18	Team Paadatha Painkili vs Team Balahanuman	23 October 2021		
19	Team Paadatha Painkili vs Team Balahanuman	24 October 2021		
20	Team Bigg Boss vs Team Bigg Boss	30 October 2021	Contestants of Bigg Boss (Malayalam season 3)	
21	Team Bigg Boss vs Team Bigg Boss	31 October 2021	Contestants of Bigg Boss (Malayalam season 3)	
22	Team Santhwanam Stars vs Team Santhwanam Gems	6 November 2021		
23	Team Santhwanam Stars vs Team Santhwanam Gems	7 November 2021		
24	Team VIP vs Team Black and White	13 November 2021	Winners of Comedy Stars	
25	Team VIP vs Team Black and White	14 November 2021	Winners of Comedy Stars	
26	Team Gents Stars vs Team Lady Stars	20 November 2021	Actors of Koodevide and Ammayariyathe	
27	Team Gents Stars vs Team Lady Stars	21 November 2021	Actors of Koodevide and Ammayariyathe	
28	Team Ammayariyathe vs Team Santhwanam	27 November 2021		
29	Team Ammayariyathe vs Team Santhwanam	28 November 2021		
30	Team Thoovalsparsham vs Team Kudumbavilakku	4 December 2021		
31	Team Thoovalsparsham vs Team Kudumbavilakku	5 December 2021		
32	Team Padatha Painkili vs Team Mounaragam	11 December 2021		
33	Team Padatha Painkili vs Team Mounaragam	12 December 2021		
34	Team Koodevide vs Team Sasneham	18 December 2021		
35	Team Koodevide vs Team Sasneham	19 December 2021		
36	Team Jingle Bells and Team Twinkle Stars	25 December 2021	Actors of Koodevide and Ammayariyathe; Christmas special episode	
37	Grand-finale	26 December 2021	Teams Santhwanam, Koodevide, Thoovalsparsham, and Padatha Painkili	
38	Grand-finale	26 December 2021	Teams Santhwanam, Koodevide, Thoovalsparsham, and Padatha Painkili	
39	Grand-finale	26 December 2021	Teams Santhwanam, Koodevide, Thoovalsparsham, and Padatha Painkili	

== Adaptations ==
Language	Title	Original release	Network(s)	No. of. Seasons	Notes
Tamil	Start Music	26 May 2019	Star Vijay	6	Original
Telugu	Start Music	5 August 2019	Star Maa	4	Remake
Malayalam	Start Music Aaradhyam Paadum	10 August 2019	Asianet	5	Remake
Kannada	Gaana Bajaana	9 November 2019	Star Suvarna	3	Remake
Bengali	Start Music	24 November 2019	Star Jalsha	1	Remake
