= Sa Re Ga Ma Pa Keralam =

- Genre: Music reality television
- Based on: Sa Re Ga Ma Pa
- Creative director: Nithin Menon
- Presented by: VJ Jeeva Joseph; Rebecca Santhosh
- Judges: Gopi Sundar; Shaan Rahman; Sujatha Mohan
- Country of origin: India
- Original language: Malayalam
- No. of seasons: 5
- No. of episodes: 313

Production
- Producer: Essel Vision Productions
- Camera setup: Multi-camera
- Running time: 90 minutes

Original release
- Network: Zee Keralam
- Release: 6 April 2019 – 15 November 2026

Related
- Sa Re Ga Ma Pa

Sa Re Ga Ma Pa Keralam is an Indian Malayalam language musical reality TV show which launched on 6 April 2019 on Zee Keralam channel. The show is produced by Essel Vision Productions. The show is the Malayalam language version of Sa Re Ga Ma Pa, the oldest running singing reality show in India.

== Overview ==
The show has two variations over the years:

- Sa Re Ga Ma Pa: Contestants were scored only by the expert judges. There were 8 prelim (quarter-final) rounds, each consisting of 2 male singers and 2 female singers. One male winner and one female winner from each show competed in the semifinal rounds. There were 4 semifinal rounds where the 8 male and 8 female prelim winners participated. Each semifinal round had either 4 male or 4 female winners, so there were a total of 4 semifinals (2 semifinals with 4 males and 2 semifinals with 4 female singers). In the finals, the four semifinal winners, 2 male and 2 female competed against each other. Finally one male winner and one female winner became the winners of that season (also called a schedule).
- Sa Re Ga Ma Pa L'il Champs: A singing competition for young children, which judges the prodigious kids on the basis of their voice quality, singing talent and versatility in performance.

== Seasons ==
Season	Premiere date	End date	Winner	Runner ups	Host	Judges	Episodes	Ref.
1	6 April 2019	15 August 2020	Libin Scaria	Aswin Vijayan P (1st), Jasim Jamal (1st), Swetha Ashok (2nd), Sreejish Subramanian (3rd) & Keerthana S K (4th)	Jeeva Joseph, Rebecca Santhosh	Permanent; Gopi Sundar, Shaan Rahman, Sujatha Mohan; Finale; Sithara Krishnakumar	104	
2	28 July 2023	21 January 2024	Sayanth	Meenakshi (1st), Nandu Krishna (2nd), Gayathri (3rd)	Jeeva Joseph	Madhu Balakrishnan, Shaan Rahman, Sujatha Mohan	51	
3	16 August 2025	7 December 2025	Devanandha	Thejus (1st), Anagha (2nd), Kuttikrishnan (3rd), Abhay (4th)	Ranjini Haridas	Deepak Dev, Alphons Joseph, Sujatha Mohan	33	

=== Li'l Champs ===
Season	Premiere date	End date	Winner	Runner ups	Host	Judges	Episodes	Ref.
1	18 April 2021	26 March 2022	Anagha Ajay	Avani SS (1st), Sanjay Suresh (2nd)	Jeeva Joseph	Permanent - Gopi Sundar, Shaan Rahman, Sujatha Mohan Recurring - Ousepachan, Jassie Gift, Ramya Nambeesan, Sudeep Kumar	90	
2	1 August 2026	15 November 2026	Arjun S	Eshal, Devatheerth, Avani, Shadhin, Vaidehi Vinod	Jeeva Joseph	Sujatha Mohan, Binni Krishnakumar, Srinivas	35	

== See also ==
- Sa Re Ga Ma Pa Bangla
- Sa Re Ga Ma Pa Hindi
- Sa Re Ga Ma Pa Kannada
- Sa Re Ga Ma Pa Marathi
- Sa Re Ga Ma Pa Tamil
- Sa Re Ga Ma Pa Telugu
