= Sthreedhanam =

- Directed by: Anil-Babu
- Screenplay by: Kaloor Dennis
- Based on: Sthreedhanam by C. V. Nirmala
- Produced by: K. P. Muhammed
- Starring: Jagadeesh; Urvashi; Meena
- Cinematography: M. J. Radhakrishnan
- Edited by: P. C. Mohan
- Music by: S. P. Venkatesh
- Production company: Sabina Arts
- Release date: 5 May 1993
- Country: India
- Language: Malayalam

Sthreedhanam (English: Dowry) is a 1993 Malayalam family drama film directed by the duo Anil-Babu and starring Jagadeesh, Urvashi and Meena in major roles.

A television soap opera, sharing the same title and adapting the movie's story, aired on Asianet from 2012 to 2018.

== Plot summary ==
Vidya is the second of four daughters of Kurupp, a bus driver who is the sole breadwinner for the family. Initially reluctant to marry Prashanthan, a government employee from a middle-class family, due to her mother-in-law Maheshwari Amma's exorbitant dowry demands, they eventually agreed to the marriage under a condition, Kurupp would provide the dowry in installments. After marriage, Vidya endured constant torment from her mother-in-law and Prashanthan's siblings due to their insatiable greed for dowry. The abuse escalated to the point where she suffered a miscarriage at the hands of her mother-in-law. However, a series of events unfolded, culminating in Prashanthan's mother being left alone when Prashanthan's siblings and their spouses also neglects her. Ultimately, Prashanthan and Vidya reconciles with her after she apologized for her past cruelty.

== Cast ==
- Jagadeesh as Prashanthan
- Urvashi as Vidya
- Meena as Maheshwari Amma
- Ashokan as Pradeep
- Baiju as Prasad
- Geetha Vijayan as Prasanna
- Usha as Vanaja, Pradeep's wife
- Vijayakumar as Sreeni, Prasanna's husband
- Mala Aravindan as Gopalan
- Oduvil Unnikrishnan as Kurupp, Vidya's father
- Sukumari as Bhanu, Vidya's mother
- Suchitra as Sushama, Vidya's younger sister
- Renuka (actress) as Vidya's elder sister
- Rajeev Rangan as Vyshakhan, Vidya's former love interest
- Nayana Bindu as Sulojana
- Prathapachandran as Vanaja's father
- Philomina as Vanaja's grandmother
