= Siragadikka Aasai (TV series) =

2023 Indian Tamil TV series

- Genre: Drama
- Screenplay by: Guru Sampath Kumar; N. Sanatham Kumar; Alvin Prashanth Raj (Episode 45-present); Dialogues: Guru Sampath Kumar Nandhan Sreedharan (Episode 1-18)
- Story by: Ananda Vikatan
- Directed by: S. Kumaran
- Starring: Gomathi Priya; Vetri Vasanth
- Theme music composer: Kiran
- Composer: Ajeay Shravan
- Country of origin: India
- Original language: Tamil
- No. of episodes: 1142

Production
- Executive producer: Raadhika Srinivasan
- Producer: B. Srinivasan
- Production location: Chennai
- Cinematography: S. T. Martz
- Editors: B. Chandru; R. Bala Gurunathan; Sasi K. Basant; Palanisamy
- Camera setup: Multi-Camera
- Running time: 22 minutes
- Production company: Vikatan Televistas Pvt Ltd

Original release
- Network: Star Vijay
- Release: 23 January 2023 – present

Siragadikka Aasai (transl. The Desire to Fly) is a 2023 Indian Tamil-language television drama that airs on Star Vijay starring Gomathi Priya and Vetri Vasanth. The series is directed by S. Kumaran and produced by Radhika Srinivasan and B. Srinivasan for Vikatan Televistas. The series was launched along with Mahanadhi.

The plot revolves around Meena, a woman from a poor family and Muthukumar, a man with a troubled past, who face various difficulties in their marriage.

== Plot ==
The show introduces a delinquent, named Muthukumar, who despises the concept of love, as well as Meena, a family-oriented woman, who works at her parents' flower-stall near their local temple.

Matters compel Meena to wed Muthukumar. He is an alcoholic, who regularly comes home drunk, also engaging in fights as well, even arguing with his mother, Vijaya, who resents him for his bad past, as well as his bad habits. The only three people in Muthukumar's family that, have love and affection for him are his father, Annamalai, a retired locomotive pilot, his younger brother, Ravikumar, who works as a chef and his grandmother, Nachiyar, who had raised him. Muthu's elder brother, Manojkumar, is an affluent corporate employee and Vijaya's favourite son. He is selfish, money-minded, status-minded, and dislikes both Annamalai and Muthukumar.

Meena faces problems with a loan shark, named Sudhakar, who lusts for Meena, as well as a poor financial status. Muthu and Meena often fight, with Meena not knowing that, Muthu is Annamalai's second son, when Muthu comes across Meena and her family. This ends up, with the two of them disliking each other, due to their constant conflicts.

After Meena's brother, Sathya is negatively influenced, by a local don, named Chiti, he ends up stealing Muthu's bike out of envy of not getting one from his parents. He ends up going to jail, but is released after Muthu withdraws the case after Meena asks him to. Sathya then speaks harshly to his father after he scolds him and kicks him out, which, makes him depressed and he kills himself, by being hit, by a train, which Annamalai was driving on his final day on the job. Feeling guilty, Annamalai pays them a visit and decides to, make Meena his daughter-in-law, instead of giving them money, as he sees that, there is more than what meets the eye in their situation. Amidst this all, Manoj is in love, with Jeeva, who has hidden intentions as she wants Annamalai's settlement money and wants to emigrate to Canada.

On the day of the wedding, it is revealed that, Manoj has eloped with Jeeva and has left a letter for his family, but Jeeva and her friend have drained the 27 lakh from their joint account and Manoj goes, into hiding out of embarrassment that, he has no money and no girlfriend, leaving everyone at the wedding hall in shock. An argument ensues between Chandra and Annamalai about the wedding, Sudhakar intervenes, with his own intentions of marrying Meena, and proceeds to beat Annamalai and Ravi up for intervening in his plan. At that moment, Muthu sees this, and beats up Sudhakar in retaliation and it's revealed to the gathering that, he is Annamalai's second son. A flashback is shown to a previous episode, where Sudhakar kidnaps Meena and Muthu, who was in a helmet at the time, saves her, Meena realizes that, Muthu was the person that, had saved her from Sudhakar. Chandra pacifies Meena and, makes her accept the marriage, with Muthu to avoid shame, well Annamalai has Muthu agree to marry Meena after nearly falling at Muthu's feet. They marry, against each other's wishes.

After Muthu and Meena's marriage, they begin building their life together. Meanwhile, Vijaya finds Manoj at a homeless center and later sees him escaping from Jeeva, leaving her shocked as she starts to question Jeeva's true intentions. Meena is also surprised, by the situation and brings Annamalai to confront Muthu. Muthu angrily rebukes Manoj for being manipulated, by Jeeva's blackmail.

Simultaneously, a dubbing artist, named Shruti is introduced. She falls in love, with Ravi. Manoj, meanwhile, meets Rohini, falls for her and shares his feelings about love. But no one knows Rohini's secret that, she has a son, named Krish and was previously married. She understands Vijaya's greedy intention to get her son married to a woman, with a wealthy background. Rohini lies about her father being a "rich businessman" in Malaysia. Despite challenges, Rohini manages to marry Manoj. Vijaya starts criticizing Meena for being poor and compares her unfavorably to Rohini.

Ravi and Shruti secretly marry, shocking everyone, especially Meena, who is blamed for supporting them. Amid all this, Annamalai collapses from a heart attack, due to the mounting pressure. Following this, Meena is welcomed back, into the house as Annamalai realizes that, she was never actually at fault. Meanwhile, Sudha passionately argues that, both Shruti and Ravi should be accepted, leading to their eventual acceptance. Meanwhile, Manoj is exposed for idly sitting in the park, instead of, making an effort to find a job.

Rohini is married to Manoj, but she conceals a critical truth, she is already married and has a young son named Krish. With remarkable cunning, she hides her past and manipulates circumstances to marry Manoj. Rohini also fabricates a grand identity, claiming to be the heiress of a fictitious Malaysian empire, a lie that leaves Vijaya deeply impressed and in awe of her supposed status.

Meanwhile, Manoj hides his own failures, particularly his inability to find a job. When the truth begins to surface, Rohini panics and runs away in distress, seeking a fresh path. But she eventually returns with a changed perspective, ready to face the consequences of her actions.

As this unfolds, the family prepares for the upcoming Pongal celebrations at Nachiyar's house. Meena and Shruti's families arrive for the festivities, bringing gifts and joy. To cover up her father's absence, Rohini hires a butcher named Mani and introduces him as her "uncle from Malaysia," adding another layer to her growing web of lies.

Nachiyar, ever the matriarch, assigns everyone kitchen and household duties. Amidst the commotion, Sathya unknowingly falls into a trap set by Chitti, completely unaware of the hidden truths playing out around him.

Beneath all the festivities and family dynamics, deeper conflicts simmer within the household. Vijaya harbors resentment toward Muthu and Meena because they are uneducated and lack financial strength compared to the other daughters-in-law. She openly favors wealth, admiring only those who bring money into the family. In contrast, Annamalai leads a morally grounded life, creating a clear divide in values.

The story moves through the sons’ struggles to build their careers and businesses, alongside their wives’ efforts to balance work, home, and the pressures of living under a mother-in-law who values money above all else. Despite Manoj's irresponsibility, Vijaya continues to favor him, deepening the emotional rifts within the family.

At the heart of the conflict lies Rohini, the main antagonist, whose hidden past and ongoing deceptions create complications for Meena, Muthu and the rest of the family. Her actions ripple through every relationship, testing bonds, loyalties and the family's unity.

== Cast ==
=== Main ===
- Gomathi Priya as Meena Muthukumar: Jayaraj and Chandra's eldest daughter; Sathya and Seetha's sister; Muthu's wife (2023–present)
- R. Vetri Vasanth as Muthukumar "Muthu" Annamalai: Annamalai and Vijaya's second son; Manoj and Ravi's brother; Meena's husband (2023–present)
  - Sri Varshan Chinraj as young Muthu

=== Supporting ===
- Anila Sreekumar as Vijaya Annamalai: Annamalai's wife; Manoj, Muthu and Ravi's mother
- Sri Deva as Manojkumar "Manoj" Annamalai: Annamalai and Vijaya's eldest son; Rohini and Kanaga's husband; Jeeva's ex-boyfriend and Meena's ex-fiancé
  - Sai Aaditya as young Manoj
- Salma Arun as Kalyani alias Rohini: Krish's biological mother; Lakshmi's daughter; Manoj's wife and Muthu's former arch-rival.
- Yogesh Kumar / Pranav Mohan as Ravikumar "Ravi" Annamalai: Annamalai and Vijaya's youngest son; Shruthi's husband
- Preetha Reddy as Shruthi Ravikumar: Vasudevan and Sudha's daughter; Ravi's wife
- R. Sundarrajan as Annamalai: Nachiyar's son; Vijaya's husband; Manoj, Muthu and Ravi's father
- Master Ashwin as Krish: Kalyani / Rohini's biological son; Lakshmi's grandson
- Bhagyalakshmi as Parvathi: Vijaya's best friend
- Tamil Selvi as Chandra Jayaraj: Late Jayaraj's wife; Meena, Sathya and Seetha's mother
- Diwakar as Sathya Jayaraj: Jayaraj and Chandra's son; Meena and Seetha's brother; Rekha's husband
- Akshara Aishu as Kanaga Manoj Kumar: Manojkumar's Second wife
- Sangeetha Leonis as Seetha Arunkumar: Jayaraj and Chandra's daughter; Meena and Sathya's sister; Arun's wife
- Harish Kumar as Arunkumar: Rajeshwari's son, Seetha's husband; Muthu's arch-rival
- Preethi as Rekha Sathya: Sinthamani's daughter; Sathya's wife
- Eesan Sujatha as Sinthamani Manohar: Meena's business-rival ; Rekha's mother
- Unknown as Swetha: Manoj, Muthu and Ravi's cousin sister
- Jagadeesh as Mishra: Swetha's love interest
- Srilekha as Maheshwari: Kalyani / Rohini and Vidya's friend; Krish's guardian
- Shruthi Narayanan as Vidhya Murugan: Kalyani / Rohini's best friend; Murugan's wife
- Cibi Chakravarthy as Murugan: Muthu's friend's brother; Vidhya's husband
- Lollu Sabha Palaniappan as Selvam: Muthu's best friend
  - Master Ritvik as young Selvam
- Sudha Pushpa as Lakshmi: Kalyani / Rohini's mother; Krish's grandmother
- A. Revathy as Nachiyar Paati: Annamalai's mother; Manoj, Muthu and Ravi's grandmother
- Baby George as Rajeshwari: Arun's mother (Dead)
- Sudhakar as Sudhakar: A loan shark
- Atchaya Bharathi as Jeeva: Manoj's former love interest
- Mahadevan as Vasudevan: Sudha's husband; Shruthi's father
- Sheela as Sudha: Vasudevan's wife; Shruthi's mother
- Hasini as Neetu: Ravi's MD
- Saran Ram as Santosh: Manoj's friend
- Unknown as Jeeva: Manoj's assistant
- Ashok Kumar as Sakthivel: A Numerologist
- Telephone Mani as Parasuraman "Parasu": Annamalai's friend
- Mani as Chiti: Sathya's ex-friend and Muthu's rival
- Vetri Kiran as Sivan: Vijaya's student; Parvathi's friend
- Ganesh Krait as Biju: Shruthi's ex-fiancée
- Balaji as Manohar: Sinthamani's husband
- V.C. Jayamani as "Brown" Mani: Rohini's fake uncle
- Shree Narayan as Dinesh: former P.A to Rohini's client
- Suresh as Deepan: Vijaya's student
- Sangeetha Pushparaj as Rathi: Vijaya's student; Deepan's lover

=== Special appearances ===
- Narasimha Raju as Jayaraj: Meena, Sathya and Seetha's father
- Ponvannan as Subramani/Kasinathan "Kasi"
- Vanitha Krishnachandran as Subbalakshmi
- Aravinth Seiju as Chozhan

== Production ==
=== Casting ===
Gomathi Priya was cast in the female lead role as Meena after her role as Valli in Velaikkaran, whilst newcomer Vetri Vasanth was cast as the male lead role as Muthukumar, with his rise to fame coming through his numerous short films which gained popularity with younger viewers. R. Sundarrajan was cast as Annamalai, and makes his comeback to Tamil television after three years. Anila Sreekumar was cast as Vijaya, returning to Vijay TV after previously acting in Paavam Ganesan and Kaatrin Mozhi on the channel. Narasimha Raju, Yogesh and Tamilselvi were also selected for supporting roles. Pranav Mohan replaced Yogesh as Ravi, after Yogesh quit the show citing personal reasons.

In January 2024, actor Jayamani joins the cast as Rohini's fake father.

=== Release ===
The first promo was unveiled on 28 December 2022, which gave a brief insight in both Muthu and Meena's lives. The second promo was unveiled on 15 January 2023, revealing the upcoming release date. The third promo was unveiled on 19 January 2023, featuring Muthu's family. The same day, a fourth promo was unveiled featuring Meena's family. This series was launched along with Mahanadhi.

=== Special episodes ===
Due to Vijay TV choosing to release Chinna Marumagal and Thangamagal a week after Bigg Boss Season 7 had ended, 1 hour special episodes of Siragadikka Aasai were telecasted from 17 January 2024 to 19 January 2024. Again in 2025, 1 hour special episodes were telecast from 20 to 24 January 2025 after the grand finale of Big Boss Season 8.

== Reception ==
On week 38 of 2023, the series entered the top 5 shows in TN with 8.17 TVR in U+R as well as became the slot leader. On the 16th week of 2024 it became the slot leader with 8.18 TVR in U+R also marking 3rd position in overall TN serials. On week 27, 2024 the series became the No 1 Serial Of Tamil Nadu for the first time with 8.38 TVR in UR market.

In July 2024, The series was the most watched Tamil-language television series with 9.84 TVR.

== Adaptations ==
Language	Title	Original release	Network(s)	Last aired	Notes
Telugu	Gunde Ninda Gudi Gantalu గుండెనిండా గుడిగంటలు	2 October 2023	Star Maa	Ongoing	Remake
Kannada	Aase ಆಸೆ	11 December 2023	Star Suvarna	Ongoing	Remake
Malayalam	Chempaneer Poovu ചെമ്പനീർ പൂവ്	29 January 2024	Asianet	Ongoing	Remake
Hindi	Udne Ki Aasha उडने की आशा	12 March 2024	StarPlus	Ongoing	Remake
Marathi	Sadhi Manasa साधी माणसं	18 March 2024	Star Pravah	29 March 2026	Remake
Bengali	Uraan উড়ান	27 May 2024	Star Jalsha	15 March 2025	Remake

== Awards and honours ==
Year	Award (Note: Awards, festivals and organizations are in Alphabetical order.)	Category	Recipient(s)	Result	Ref.
2023	Ananda Vikatan Television Awards	Best Director	S. Kumaran	Won	
2023	Ananda Vikatan Television Awards	Promising Talent of the year	Vetri Vasanth	Won	
2023	Ananda Vikatan Television Awards	Best Voice Over Artist	Kalyani Anbazhagan	Won	
2023	Ananda Vikatan Television Awards	Best Editor	B. Chandru	Won	
2023	Ananda Vikatan Television Awards	Favourite Family	Siragadikka Aasai	Won	
2024	9th Annual Vijay Television Awards	Best Heroine	Gomathi Priya	Won	
2024	9th Annual Vijay Television Awards	Best Director	S. Kumaran	Won	
2024	9th Annual Vijay Television Awards	Best Hero	Vetri Vasanth	Won	
2024	9th Annual Vijay Television Awards	Best Mamanaar	R. Sundarrajan	Won	
2024	9th Annual Vijay Television Awards	Best Mamiyar	Anila Sreekumar	Won	
2024	9th Annual Vijay Television Awards	Best Paati	Revathy	Won	
2024	9th Annual Vijay Television Awards	Best Supporting Actor Male (Fiction)	Sri Deva	Won	
2024	9th Annual Vijay Television Awards	Best Supporting Actor Female (Fiction)	Salma Arun	Won	
