= Etho Janma Kalpanayil =

2024 Malayalam television series

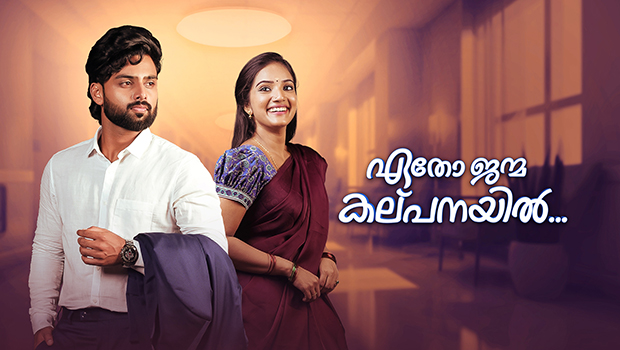
- Genre: Drama; Romance; Comedy
- Created by: Merryland Studio
- Based on: Iss Pyaar Ko Kya Naam Doon?
- Screenplay by: Ganesh Olikkara
- Directed by: Sachin K. Ibaque
- Starring: Visal Ramachandran; Aiswarya Suresh
- Music by: Sanand George
- Country of origin: India
- Original language: Malayalam
- No. of seasons: 1
- No. of episodes: 412

Production
- Producer: Saranya Subramaniam
- Production location: Palakkad Trivandrum
- Cinematography: Manoj
- Camera setup: Multi camera
- Running time: 20 minutes
- Production company: Merryland Studio

Original release
- Network: Asianet; JioHotstar (India); Disney+ Hotstar
- Release: 29 January 2024 – 29 August 2025

Related
- Iss Pyaar Ko Kya Naam Doon?

Etho Janma Kalpanayil (ഏതോ ജന്മ കല്പനയിൽ) is a Malayalam-language romantic drama television series that aired on Asianet from 29 January 2024 to 29 August 2025. This series is a remake of the Hindi television series Iss Pyaar Ko Kya Naam Doon?, which aired on StarPlus. It stars Visal Ramachandran and Aiswarya Suresh in the lead roles.

== Synopsis ==
The story revolves around the lives of Sruthy, A simple, optimistic, and middle-class girl from rural Palakkad and Ashwin, A rich, arrogant, and successful business tycoon. Their paths collide when Sruthy accidentally interferes with one of Ashwin's business, leading him to believe she is responsible for sabotaging it. This misunderstanding sets the stage for a series of clashes and confrontations between the two, fueled by Ashwin's anger and Sruthy's determination to prove her innocence.

However, as their interactions continue, a spark ignites between them, despite their contrasting personalities and social backgrounds. Aswin finds himself drawn to Sruthy's positive outlook and unwavering spirit, while Sruthy sees beneath his gruff exterior to the vulnerable man he hides.

Their journey is filled with challenges, misunderstandings, and betrayals, testing the strength of their bond. They must overcome societal pressures, family conflicts, and their own personal demons to finally confess their love for each other.

== Cast ==
=== Main ===
- Visal Ramachandran as Ashwin Sai Ram (ASR)
- Aiswarya Suresh as Sruthy Kumari Lakshmi

=== Recurring ===
- Prasanth Kumar P. as Syam Madhav
- Manju Pathrose as Manorama
- Sreelatha Namboothiri / Geetha Nair as Subhadramma
- Shynas as Akash
- Nidheesh Nair as Mohan
- Sindhu Varma as Pramila
- Rahul as Ashokan
- Dr.Vinaya Esmi as Preethi
- Divya Yeshodaran as Anjali
- Angelina Lyson as Lavanya
- Rajani Rajendran as Radha
- Joemon Joshy as Nandha Kishore "NK"
- Ambika Mohan as Indira

Cameo appearance

- Arun Nair as Sachi

== Production ==
A launch event of the show along with another TV series Chempaneer Poovu was held at Kozhikode. The event was broadcast on Asianet on 28 January 2024 a day before the show's launch.
