= Chempaneer Poovu =

2024 Indian Malayalam TV series

- Genre: Soap opera
- Based on: Siragadikka Aasai
- Written by: Guru Sampath Kumar
- Screenplay by: Rajani
- Directed by: Manju Dharman (2024); Ruggu Ratheesh (2024-present)
- Starring: Rebecca Santhosh; Arun Nair
- Theme music composer: Gopal Venkatesh
- Composer: Rajeev Attunkal
- Country of origin: India
- Original language: Malayalam
- No. of episodes: 840+

Production
- Executive producers: Ashly; Dr Shaju; Evana; Shani
- Producer: Dr. Shaju
- Production location: Thiruvananthapuram
- Cinematography: Binosh Thampi; Arun
- Editor: Ajithraj Arinalloor
- Camera setup: Multi-camera
- Running time: 22 minutes
- Production company: Evans Digi Media

Original release
- Network: Asianet; JioHotstar
- Release: 29 January 2024 – present

Chempaneer Poovu (transl. Red Rose) is an Indian Malayalam language family romantic soap opera that premiered from 29 January 2024 on Asianet. It is an official remake of Tamil television series Siragadikka Aasai The series stars Arun Nair and Gomathi Priya (later replaced by Rebecca Santhosh).

== Synopsis ==
The show centres on the unexpected marriage of Revathy, the eldest daughter of a lower-class family, and Sachidanandan alias Sachi, an eccentric taxi driver struggling with alcoholism. After marriage, though they had many issues and conflict with each other, both lives as a happy and loving husband and wife but many people including some of their family members tries various ways to create conflict between them and tries to separate them. However, Sachi and Revathy tries their best to overcome those challanges and never be separated.

== Cast ==
=== Main ===
- Arun Nair as Sachidanandan "Sachi": Ravi's and Chandra's second's son; Revathy's husband; an alcoholic and short tempered car driver due to his bitter past. (2024–present)
- Gomathi Priya (episode 1 to 220) / Rebecca Santhosh (episode 221 onwards) as Revathy: Sachi's wife; A kind, respectful and determined young woman from a middle-lower family who does multiple odd jobs to support her family. She works at her parents' flower-stall near their local temple.

=== Recurring ===
- KPAC Saji as Raveendran Nair "Ravi": Sudhi, Sachi and Sreekanth's father; Chandramathi's husband; A retired KSRTC driver, he is the only one in Sachi's family that cares for him and is also a father figure to Revathy after her father's death. (2024–present)
- Padma George (episode 1 to 627) / Reshmi Soman (episode 627 onwards) as Chandramathi "Chandra": Raveendran's wife; Sudhi, Sachi and Sreekanth's mother; She dislikes Sachi due to some past mishaps and hates Revathy for her low economic status
- Anand Narayan as Sudheendran "Sudhi", Ravi's and Chandra's eldest son; Neelima's past love interest; Revathy's former fiancee; Sruthy's husband; A home-appliance showroom owner with 7 degrees.(2024–present)
- Muneer Munna as Sreekanth: Ravi's and Chandra's youngest son, Sachi's and Sudhi's younger brother (2024–present)
- Anjali Hari as Shruthi "Kalyani": Sudhi's wife; A lady from a poor family act as a daughter of Malaysian based millionaire; Vimala's Daughter: Aadhi's mother; Chandramathi's favourite turned evil daughter-in-law, who hates Sachi, Revathy and Sreekanth because of bad reasons (2024–present)
- Sreekutty as Varsha: Sreekanth's wife who loves Revathy and considers her as a sister figure; a dubbing artist who is feared of pregnancy (2024–present)
- Maya Rajan as Kalavathy, Raveendran's mother, Sudhi's, Sachi's and Sreekanth's grandmother who is trained in varma kalai and raised Sachi after his bitter past. (2024–present)
- Darshana Unni as Lakshmi: Revathy's, Devu's and Sharath's mother who Sachi considers as a mother figure after Chandra (2024–present)
- Medha Pallavi (episode 1 to 802) / Parvathy (episode 802 onwards) as Devika "Devu": Revathy's and Sharath's sister
- Shaansai as Sharath: Revathy's and Devu's brother and Sachi's brother-in-law (2024–present)
- Jeevan Gopal as Roshan: Varsha's Ex-fiance
- Raheena Anas as Neelima: Sudhi's former love interest and Sachi's favourite customer and friend who cheats Sudhi out of the settlement money and escapes to Canada, but later she returns the money. (2024–present)
- Anu Joji as Bhama: Chandra's friend (2024–present)
- Anu Paralekshmi as Prashanthan "Eecha": Sachi's friend (2024–present)
- Aneesh Kailas as Jishnu: Sachi's friend (2024–present)
- Tom Mattel as Gajanandan: A moneylender to whom Krishnan and his family owe money who lusts after Revathy and has vowed to take revenge on Sachi. (2024–present)
- Prasanth Kumar as CPO Arun, an arrogant and corrupt police officer who is Devu's love interest turned husband and Sachi's enemy
- Rahul Vellayani as Antony, A ruthless and moneylender who is Sharath's friend turned enemy and has vowed to take revenge on Sachi and Revathy
- Vanchiyoor Praveen Kumar as Ashokan: Raveendran's close friend (2024–present)
- R.Pradeep as Krishnan: A flower seller; Revathy, Devu and Sharath's father (Dead)
- Vishwam as Madhusoodanan Nair: Varsha's father; who hates Raveendran & Family (2024–present)
- Unknown as Mahima Nair: Varsha's mother; Madhusoodanan's wife (2024–present)
- Unknown as Gayathri: Arun's mother and Devu's mother-in-law (2024–present)
- Adhithi Panicker as Meera: Sruthi's friend who works in beauty parlor (2024–present)
- Padmakumar as CI Narayanan Kutty – Circle Inspector of Police
- Shibu Laban as Jayaraj "Beeran", A butcher and small time actor who acts as Sruthi's Malaysian uncle
- Abhishek Jayakrishnan Vaidyar as Groom

== Production ==
=== Casting ===
Debutant Arun Nair was cast as Sachi and Gomathi Priya was cast as Revathy, reprising her role from the original series Siragadikka Aasai. Later Gomathi Priya was replaced by Rebecca Santhosh.

=== Broadcast ===
A launching event of the show, along with another TV series Etho Janma Kalpanayil was held at Kozhikode. The event was broadcast on Asianet on 28 January 2024, a day before the show's premiere.

== Adaptations ==
Language	Title	Original release	Network(s)	Last aired	Notes
Tamil	Siragadikka Aasai சிறகடிக்க ஆசை	23 January 2023	Star Vijay	Ongoing	Original
Telugu	Gunde Ninda Gudi Gantalu గుండెనిండా గుడిగంటలు	2 October 2023	Star Maa	Ongoing	Remake
Kannada	Aase ಆಸೆ	11 December 2023	Star Suvarna	Ongoing	Remake
Malayalam	Chempaneer Poovu ചെമ്പനീർ പൂവ്	29 January 2024	Asianet	Ongoing	Remake
Hindi	Udne Ki Aasha उडने की आशा	12 March 2024	StarPlus	Ongoing	Remake
Marathi	Sadhi Manasa साधी माणसं	18 March 2024	Star Pravah	29 March 2026	Remake
Bengali	Uraan উড়ান	27 May 2024	Star Jalsha	15 March 2025	Remake

== Awards ==
Chempaneer Poovu got Majority Awards from the Asianet Television awards 2024.

Year	Award	Category	Recipient(s)	Result	Ref.
2024	Asianet Television Awards	Best Serial		Won	
2024	Asianet Television Awards	Most Popular Serial		Won	
2024	Asianet Television Awards	Best Actor	Arun Nair	Won	
2024	Asianet Television Awards	Most Popular Actor	Arun Nair	Won	
2024	Asianet Television Awards	Best New Face	Gomathi Priya	Won	
2024	Asianet Television Awards	Most Popular Actress	Gomathi Priya	Won	
2024	Asianet Television Awards	Best Actress	Gomathi Priya	Nominated	
2024	Asianet Television Awards	Best Editor	Ajith Arinellore	Won	
2024	Asianet Television Awards	Best Dubbing Artist (Male)	Sidharthan	Won	
2024	Asianet Television Awards	Best Supporting Actor (Male)	K.P.A.C. Saji	Won	
2024	Asianet Television Awards	Popular Character Actor	K.P.A.C. Saji	Won	
2024	Asianet Television Awards	Most Popular Director	Ruggu Ratheesh	Won	
2024	Asianet Television Awards	Best Actor in Negative Role (Male)	Tom Mattel	Nominated	
2024	2nd Kerala Vision Television Awards	Most Popular Serial	Chempaneer Poovu	Won	
2024	2nd Kerala Vision Television Awards	Best Director	Manjudharman	Won	
2024	2nd Kerala Vision Television Awards	Best Supporting Actress	Riya George	Nominated	
2025	3rd Kerala Vision Television Awards	Best Actor	Arun Nair	Won	
2025	3rd Kerala Vision Television Awards	Best Supporting Actor	K.P.A.C. Saji	Won	
2026	Asianet Television Awards	Best Second Serial		Won	
2026	Asianet Television Awards	Best Star Pair	Arun Nair & Rebecca Santhosh	Won	
2026	Asianet Television Awards	Best Actress in Negative Role	Anjali Hari	Won	
2026	Asianet Television Awards	Best Dubbing Artist (Male)	Sidharthan	Won	
2026	Asianet Television Awards	Popular Character Actor	Anand Menon	Nominated	
2026	Asianet Television Awards	Popular Character Actress	Reshmi Soman	Nominated	
2026	Asianet Television Awards	Popular Director	Unni Pooruruttathi	Nominated	
2026	Asianet Television Awards	Popular Actor	Arun Nair	Nominated	
2026	Asianet Television Awards	Popular Actress	Rebecca Santhosh	Nominated	
2026	Asianet Television Awards	Popular Serial		Nominated	

== Reception ==
According to the Broadcast Audience Research Council (BARC) ratings, the TRP performance of Chempaneer Poovu is as follows:

Month / Period	Rank	Ref
January 2024	5	
February 2024	3	
June 2024	1	
September 2024	1	
December 2024	1	
April 2025	2	
May 2025	1	
July 2025	1	
September 2025	1	
October 2025	1	
November 2025	1	
January 2026	1	
February 2026	1	
March 2026	1	
April 2026	1	
May 2026	1	

TRP ratings have not been published since 2 July 2026, after the Ministry of Information and Broadcasting (India) directed BARC to suspend the publication of television ratings across all genres until its licence is renewed under the Television Ratings Policy, 2026.
