= Kasthooriman (TV series) =

Indian soap-opera television series

- Genre: Soap opera
- Based on: Sense and Sensibility by Jane Austen and The Parent Trap
- Developed by: Ayman Creative Team
- Written by: N. Vinu Narayanan (episodes 1-400): Ayman Creative Team (episodes 400-880); Krishna Poojappura (episodes 880-905)
- Directed by: Sunil Kariattukara (episodes 1–105): Krishna Moorthy (episodes 105–190); Sachin K. Ibaque (episodes 190–905)
- Creative director: M C Ratheesh
- Presented by: Shan A
- Starring: Rebecca Santhosh; Sreeram Ramachandran
- Theme music composer: Vishwajith
- Opening theme: "Mangalyam Thanthunane"
- Ending theme: "Jeevaanantham maangalyam"
- Composer: Saanandh George
- Country of origin: India
- Original language: Malayalam
- No. of episodes: 905 (2 Seasons)

Production
- Producer: Shan A
- Production location: Trivandrum
- Cinematography: Manoj Kalagrammam; Anuragh Guna
- Editors: Ajay Prasannan; Gigo George
- Camera setup: Multi-camera
- Running time: 22minutes
- Production company: Airmen Creations

Original release
- Network: Asianet
- Release: 11 December 2017 – 27 March 2021

Related
- Chandanamazha; Kumkum Bhagya

Kasthooriman (Musk Deer) is an Indian Malayalam television series directed by Sachin K. Ibaque. The show premiered on Asianet on 11 December 2017. It stars Rebecca Santhosh and Sreeram Ramachandran along with senior actors Praveena, Raghavan, Sreelatha Namboothiri, and Beena Antony. It aired on Asianet and on-demand through Disney+ Hotstar. The show aired its last episode on 27 March 2021.

Set in Trivandrum and the family's kalakshetra (traditional artists' studio), the story revolves around the family life of widow Sethulakshmi and her three unwed daughters, and their determination to have a happy family life despite the lack of a male head of household.

The first season of the show was based on the English novel Sense and Sensibility by Jane Austen. The show deviated from the novel because of audience request, and started airing the second season with the story line of the movie The Parent Trap. The show is also dubbed into Hindi as Adhoore Hum Adhoore Tum on StarPlus.

== Seasons ==
Season	Original release	Episodes
1	11 December 2017 – 3 July 2020	684
2	13 July 2020 – 27 March 2021	219

== Plot ==
=== Season-1 ===
Kavya's latest attempt at marriage fails when her fiancé's family demands her to transfer her family's ancestral property to her future husband's name, which would leave her widow mother and unwed younger sisters homeless. Kavya later falls in love with her friend and tenant Sreejith, only learning after they are engaged that he loves her sister Keerthi.

Keerthi begins working for Siddharth, and after a time they confess their love for each other. However, his best friend Jeeva expects Siddharth to marry Shivani, Jeeva's sister. Shivani presumes that it is Kavya that Siddharth loves, and so in a misguided attempt to come between them, Jeeva marries Kavya. Kavya later learns of this and accepts her presumed role to protect Keerthi. Marriage plans are finalized for Siddharth and Shivani, but he abandons her to secretly date Keerthi.

Jeeva and Kavya become closer. Jeeva's ex-girlfriend Neethu tries to get Jeeva back by claiming that he is the father of her unborn child, faking a DNA test. She, Shivani, and Dhyan (the biological father of Neethu's child) then attempt to kill Jeeva. This fails, and Vijaylakshmi, Jeeva's grandmother gives ownership of Ishwaramatam Group to Kavya. Later, Jeeva and Vijaylakshmi work together to expose Neethu and Dhyan, who are thrown out of Ishwaramatam.

Shivani and her mother, Indira Bhai plot to have Neethu suffer a miscarriage, and they blame it on Kavya. Neethu presses charges against Kavya, but Jeeva sets himself up as the culprit to save Kavya, jeopardizing his film career. Kavya and Sreejith save Jeeva and Indira is arrested.

Shivani steals money which was meant for Jeeva's new film project, and uses it to release Indira from prison. Conflict results as blame shifts over the lost funds. Keerthi resigns from the company along with Siddhu, whom she pressures into marriage. With Indira's help, Shivani plots against her brother Shiva, having him kidnapped but saying that Kavya and Jeeva won't pay the ransom to turn Shiva against them.

Indira blocks the sale of a property needed to finance Jeeva's new film project, leading to her expulsion and a lawsuit. Kavya is pressured to appear in the film. Shivani destroys evidence and frames Siddhu, causing a rift between Kavya and Keerthi. Pregnant Kavya is hospitalized when Shivani poisons her food. The machinations eventually become too much for Shiva, who admits to his misdeeds with his mother in order to protect Sreejith's sister, Sreekutty's baby.

Jeeva suffers amnesia following an auto collision, with the family warned not to force his memories. He misbehaves and quarrels with Kavya, who is explained to be his nurse, but when she leaves he has her brought back as his secretary. Although Shivani schemes against Kavya, Jeeva realizes his feelings and arranges to propose to Kavya. Kavya learns of this and gently tries to explain their life together but Jeeva develops a severe headache and cannot understand.

Jeeva is arrested for abducting Abhirami, said to be his wife, who is found in a mental asylum. She and the police convince Jeeva to take responsibility and bring her home, and he tries to make amends though others in the family say she is a fake. Abhirami schemes to have Kavya expelled from the house. Jeeva reads Kavya's diary and realizes that she is his wife and carrying his child; uncertain of who his enemies are, he feigns ignorance of this but is more caring toward Kavya. After Abhirami's claims become more outrageous, Jeeva confides to Kavya that he remembers her, and asks her help catch those responsible for his automobile collision.

Later another girl, Sahira, is appointed to take care of Kavya's health. Kavya, however, miscarries the baby and requests Sahira to be a surrogate mother of Kavya and Jeeva's child. In return, Kavya takes care of the expenses of Sahira's sister's treatment. Sahira accepts the proposal. However things took a turn when another man, Shankar, claims that Kavya is his wife and shows photographs to Sahira. He raises the claim in court. However Kavya proves him wrong in Court. Things go downhill when Sahira miscarries the child. Later Kavya finds that she is again pregnant with Jeeva's child.

A marriage proposal comes Shivani's way. The guy, Jayesh, is a doctor. Indira wants Shivani to marry Jayesh thinking about the status they could get once Shivani is married to a doctor. The astrologer, however, tells Vijaylakshmi and others, that if this marriage is solemnised, it could create problems in the groom's family. Later Kavya and Jeeva plans to trick Indira. They make Shivani and Indira observe several poojas. The marriage finally took place and the situation quickly deteriorates.

Neethu and Dhyan tries to ruin the marriage by telling Jayesh about the relationship Shivani once had with Sidharth. Shivani seeks help from Kavya and Kavya discloses the truth to Jayesh. He, however, states that he is not bothered by such stories and fires Dhyan.

Listening to her mother's advice, Shivani creates havoc in Jayesh's house. Jayesh slaps Shivani when she questions about the purity of his mother, Vanaja, who is a retired school teacher. Indira challenges him claiming that she will make him pay for slapping her daughter, Shivani. A case is filed and Kavya appears for Jayesh and his mother and pleads not guilty. They win the case and Shivani and her mother feel disappointed. Later Shivani finds that she is pregnant with Jayesh's baby. Indira, however, forces her to abort the baby. Dr. Annie Thomas who is an old friend of Dr. Jayesh, informs him about Shivani's pregnancy. He requests her to somehow convince Shivani and Indira not to abort the baby. In an attempt to cause abortion, Indira mixes poison in the pudding made by Vijaylakshmi. Shivani is suspicious and seeks help from Jeeva and Kavya. Also Shivani finds Jayesh with a new girl. She is disturbed and follows Jayesh. Kavya and Jeeva later decide to take Shivani back to Ishwaramatam with them. It turns out that the girl Shivani saw with Jayesh was his cousin, Devika. Jeeva and Kavya, however, on Jayesh's direction, conceals it from Shivani. Shivani is disturbed and wants Jayesh back. Months later, Jeeva is shown waiting before the Labour room and appears very tensed and Vijaylakshmi consoles him. Dr. Gayathri arrives and tells Jeeva that Kavya has delivered twin girls who are named Riya and Diya.

=== Season-2 (Years later) ===
Kavya and Jeeva are now separated. Kavya has the custody of Diya and Jeeva has the custody of Riya. Kavya and Diya are living with Sreejith who has a son named Appu. (Sreejith is like a guardian for Kavya, they are not married).Achamma who is saddened with Kavya's separation from Ishwaramatam compels Jeeva to remarry. Diya wishes to go to Jeeva's house for an interview for a project from school not knowing that he is her father as Kavya hadn't said to her about Diya's father or his family. Now enters at Ishwaramatam, Urmila in the name of writing a biography of Jeeva. Actually she is sent by G.K who wants Appu. Then Adv. Kavya comes to Kochi to present a divorce case of a minister son named Juan.She stayed at the same resort where Kavya and Jeeva spent there honeymoon. Those memories of Jeeva threats Kavya. On the other hand, Jeeva too comes to the same resort for the shooting of his new film. After some delima Kavya realised that Jeeva is staying in the same resort next to her room. During this time Juan falls in love with Kavya and he proposes an upset minded Kavya. (Kavya during this time was upset minded thinking about Jeeva and is not hearing what Juan says.) During this time, Jeeva realised that Kavya too is there in that resort from the resort manager. After freezing the shooting he returned to the resort but with a fraction of a second Kavya leaves the resort, after learning that Diya is not well. Jeeva finds Kavya's presence from the CCTV footage. Later, he went back after taking a short shoot break. Kavya too returns home. Later Juan surprises Kavya by paying a surprise visit to her. But Sreejith didn't digest with this, he insulted Juan. Kavya and Sreejith made heated argument about Juan's behavior. Later Juan's sister, Jennifer stuns Kavya by making a surprise visit to her. She also gifted Kavya a golden ring. On the otherside Riya overhears Jeeva's conversation with Achamma (Vijayalekshmi) about what had happened at the resort. Riya discovers that she had a younger sister and her mother's name is "Kavya". Later Riya tries to call all the people named Kavya in Facebook. After many attempts she called a fraud lady with a fake Account in name of "Kavya". She pretend Riya that she is her mother. Later Riya went to meet the lady. She misleads Riya about her sister. She manages to get money by fooling the little girl. Later the fraud lady along with her two friends set trap for Riya. Their plan was to kidnap Riya for getting money. They took Riya with them pretending her to meet her younger sister. On their way, Urmila saw Riya travelling with the frauds in the car, and informs Jeeva about the same. Jeeva rescues Riya.

Jeeva and Kavya coincidentally send their daughters to the same summer camp, where they meet and take an immediate dislike to one another. They play pranks on each other and after one prank goes too far, the two girls are isolated together as punishment until camp is over. One night they discover they are twin sisters and hatch a plan: To switch places in order to meet the parents they have never met and to eventually reunite them. Riya visits Kavya's house as Diya and Diya visits Ishwaramatam as Riya. The duo face difficulties to hide their identities from their parents. Later Kavya and Jeeva faces Bhaskarji's threat but comes out of it. Appu finds about Riya and teams up with her. After a lot of hurdles Riya and Diya decides to reunite their parents by meeting in the same resort but fails. Later, Kavya and Jeeva gets suspicious of Riya and Diya's changed behaviour and keeps an eye on them. Vijayalakshmi is hospitalized which makes the family worried. Kavya learns about Vijayalakshmi's condition and decides to meet her with the help of her friend. Kavya meets Vijayalakshmi without Jeeva's knowledge and Jeeva gets suspicious of it. Appu gets emotional after overhearing Kavya and Sreejith's conversation. Riya tries to console an upset Appu. In a twist Jeeva comes to learn about Riya and Diya. It is later revealed that Kavya's sister Kalyani is Appu's mother. Although Kavya goes to meet Kalyani, the latter doesn't remember her. Vijayalakshmi meets Kavya and Kavya reveals that Kalyani was raped by GK's son Abhijith. GK had accidentally killed Abhijith by mistake, and put the blame on Kavya. Jeeva realises the truth and reunites with Kavya. The story ends with the family celebrating Diya's and Riya's birthday while the doctor announces that Kavya is pregnant with twins again.

== Cast ==
=== Main ===
- Rebecca Santhosh in a dual role as:
  - Advocate Kavya: Sethulakshmi's eldest daughter, Jeeva's wife, Keerthy's and Kalyani's sister (Voice dubbed by Devi S.)
  - Kavitha: Shankar's wife (photo presence)
- Sreeram Ramachandran as Jeeva "Kannan": A film star, Shiva's and Shivani's brother and Kavya's husband (Voice dubbed by Shankar Lal)
- Pooja Nithya Menon in a dual role as:
  - Riya, Kavya's and Jeeva's elder twin,
  - Diya, Kavya's and Jeeva's younger twin
- Praveena as Sethulakshmi: A self-made artist who was gifted a kalakshetra by the king of Travancore and Kavya's, Keerthy's and Kalyani's mother

=== Recurring ===
- Akash Mahesh as Appu: Kalyani's son, Riya's and Diya's cousin and adopted brother
- Sreelatha Namboothiri as Vijayalakshmi: Jeeva's, Shiva's and Shivani's grandmother
- Siddharth Venugopal / Pramod Mani as Sidharth "Sidhu": Keerthy's husband, CEO of Ishwaramatam Group and Jeeva's best friend
- Della George as Keerthy: Sethulakshmi's second daughter, Sidharth's wife, Kavya's and Kalyani's sister
- Kiran Aravindakshan as Advocate Sreejith Bhaskar: Kavya's friend and a tenant on the kalakshetra who is Sreekutty's brother
- Raghavan as Kalamandalam Krishnankutty Ashan: Kavya's, Keerthy's and Kalyani's grandfather, and Sethulekshmi's father-in-law
- Ramiz Raja / Jeevan Gopal as Shiva: Jeeva's half brother, Shivani's brother and Sreekutty's husband
- Binny George as Bincy: Shivani's friend
- Pratheeksha G Pradeep as Shivani: Jeeva's half sister, Shiva's sister, Jayesh's wife
- Beena Antony as Indira Bhai: Shiva's and Shivani's mother, Jeeva's step-mother
- Haritha G Nair as Sreekutty: Shiva's wife, Sreejith's sister
- Bincy Joseph as Sreekutty's friend
- Shreya Raj Nair / Angelina Lyson as Neethu: Jeeva's ex-girlfriend
- Hareendran as Jayesh: Shivani's husband, Jeeva's and Shiva's brother-in-law
- Sreekala V.K. as Vanaja teacher: Jayesh's mother, Shivani's mother-in-law
- Krishnapriya K Nair / Devika Unni as Kalyani "Kallumol": Sethulakshmi's third daughter, Appu's mother, Kavya's and Keerthy's sister and Jeeva's and Sidharth's sister-in-law
- Resh Lakshana as Abirami "Abhi"
- Rohit as Jayakrishnan: Jeeva, Shiva's and Shivani's father, Vijayalakshmi's son
- Sajan Surya as Shankar: Kavitha's husband
- Devendranath as Dr. George, Jeeva's doctor
- Sindhu Jacob as Sreejith's and Sreekutty's mother
- Maneesh Krishnan as Shyam: Kavya's ex-fiancée
- Ranjith Raj as Dhyan: Neethu's boyfriend
- Manu Mohan as Aravind
- Haridas as Akhil: Shyam's close friend
- Ambarish M S as Vinod: Sreejith's friend
- Sangeetha Rajendran as Radhika: Kavya's aunt, Keerthy, Kalyani, Sethumadhavan's wife, Sethulakshmi's sister-in-law
- Albert as Sethumadhavan: Sethulakshmi's brother
- Anju Aravind as Sulochana: Shyam's mother
- Kottayam Rashid as David
- Parvathy Raveendran as Dr. Gayathri
- Rini Raj as Urmila, a spy sent by GK and also Kavya's gynaecologist
- Chilanka as Sahira: Kavya's caretaker, Kavya's and Jeeva's surrogate
- Santhosh Kurup as Sahira's father
- Arya Sreeram as Devika
- Prajusha as Advocate
- Kavitha Lakshmi as Anitha
- Aparna Ramesh as Remya: Jeeva's step-sister's from his father's third marriage
- Sumi Santhosh as: Jeeva's father's third wife
- Lakshmi Sanal as Raji
- Alice Christy as Actress
- Sethu Lakshmi as Thankam
- Badri as Devan: Kalyani's husband
- Nandan Senanipuram : as resort staff and art associate at crew

=== Cameos ===
- Isha Talwar as Herself [Episode 91, 92, 95 and 96]
- Aju Varghese as himself [Episode 95 and 96]
- Ratheesh as Jeeva, Jeeva's father (photo presence)
- Soundarya as Jeeva's mother (photo presence)
- Pauly Valsan as Nalini

== Awards and nominations ==
Year	Award	Category	Recipient	Result
2018	Asianet Television Awards	Best Actress	Rebecca Santhosh	Nominated
2018	Asianet Television Awards	Best Debut Female	Della & Krishnapriya	Nominated
2018	Asianet Television Awards	Best Debut Female	Haritha Nair	Won
2018	Asianet Television Awards	Best Debut Male	Kiran Aravindakshan	Won
2018	Asianet Television Awards	Best Debut Male	Sreeram Ramachandran	Nominated
2018	Asianet Television Awards	Best Debut Male	Sidharth Venugopal	Nominated
2018	Asianet Television Awards	Best Debut Male	Ramiz Raja	Nominated
2018	Asianet Television Awards	Best Serial	Kasthooriman	Won
2018	Asianet Television Awards	Best Character Actress	Praveena	Won
2018	Asianet Television Awards	Lifetime Achievement Award	Raghavan	Won
2018	Asianet Television Awards	Youth Icon	Sreeram Ramachandran	Won
2018	Nimali Chinmayam Awards	New Face	Rebecca Santhosh	Won
2018	Jaycee Foundation Awards	Best Actress	Rebecca Santhosh	Won
2019	Asianet Television Awards	Best Actor	Sreeram Ramachandran	Won
2019	Asianet Television Awards	Most Popular Actor	Sreeram Ramachandran	Nominated
2019	Asianet Television Awards	Best Serial	Kasthooriman	Nominated
2019	Asianet Television Awards	Most Popular Serial	Kasthooriman	Nominated
2019	Asianet Television Awards	Best Director	Sachin	Nominated
2019	Asianet Television Awards	Most Popular Actress	Rebecca Santhosh	Won
2019	Asianet Television Awards	Best Actress	Rebecca Santhosh	Nominated
2019	Asianet Television Awards	Best Character Actress	Sreelatha Namboothiri	Nominated
2019	Asianet Television Awards	Best Videographer	Anurag Guna	Won
2019	Asianet Television Awards	Best Actress in a Negative Role	Beena Antony	Nominated
2019	Asianet Television Awards	Best Dubbing Artist Female	Devi S.	Won
2019	Asianet Television Awards	Best Dubbing Artist Male	Shankar Lal	Nominated
2019	Asianet Television Awards	Best Editor	Ajay Prasannan	Won
2019	Asianet Television Awards	Best Star Pair	Sreeram & Rebecca	Nominated

== Reception ==
The show was launched on 11 December 2017 at 8.30 PM IST. Later the show was moved to 9.00 PM IST. In December 2019, The channel decided to move the show to afternoon slot of 2.30 PM IST for the launch of Mounaragam, but due to high requests from audience the channel decided to maintain it in primetime and from 16 December 2019, it began airing at 9.30 PM IST. After COVID-19 related break for about 2 months, show began airing from 1 June 2020. But after a month, the show took a one-week break again due to COVID-19 and from 13 July 2020, second season of the show began airing at 6.30 PM IST with slight new cast. But the second season received slight criticism for its change in storyline. Despite this, the show performed well in evening slot and went off-air on 27 March 2021.

== Adaptations ==
Language	Title	Original release	Network(s)	Last aired	Notes
Malayalam	Kasthooriman കസ്തൂരിമാൻ	11 December 2017	Asianet	27 March 2021	Original
Telugu	Siri Siri Muvvalu ಸಿರಿ ಸಿರಿ ಮುವ್ವಲು	21 January 2019	Star Maa	28 August 2020	Remake
Marathi	Chhatriwali छत्रीवाली	18 June 2018	Star Pravah	21 September 2019	Remake
Kannada	Bayasade Bali Bande ಬಯಸದೆ ಬಲಿ ಬಂದೆ	15 April 2019	Star Suvarna	10 April 2020	Remake
Bengali	Ogo Nirupoma ওগো নিরুপমা	5 October 2020	Star Jalsha	1 August 2021	Remake
