= Anila Sreekumar =

Indian actress

- Education: Government Arts and Science College, Kozhikode, Kerala
- Occupation: Actress
- Years active: 1992–present
- Spouse: RP sreekumar
- Children: 2
- Parents: Peethambaran; Padmavathy

Anila Sreekumar (born February 11, 1970) is an Indian actress who predominantly works in Malayalam films and television series.

== Personal life ==
Anila Sreekumar was born on February 11, 1970, in Chevayur, Kozhikode, India. Sreekumar is married to production controller and producer Sreekumar, and the couple has two children, Abhinav and Adhilekshmi.

== Career ==
Sreekumar began her acting career in 1992 with her debut in the Malayalam film Sargam. She went on to establish herself in Malayalam television, appearing in popular serials such as Deepangal Chuttum, Draupadi, Jwalayayi, Gundeninda Gudigantalu, Krishnathulasi, and Chinna Thambi.

== Filmography ==
Year	Title	Role	Notes
1992	Sargam	Maid	
1994	Parinayam	Nanikutty	
1994	Chakoram	Santha Surendran	
1995	Kalyanji Anandji	Bhagyalakshmi	
1995	Pai Brothers	Parvathy Ganapathi Pai	
1995	Vrudhanmare Sookshikkuka	Manager Shanti	
1995	Chantha	Laila	
1995	Saadaram	Kallu	
1995	Alancheri Thamprakkal	Vimala	
1996	Mr. Clean	Gayathri	
1997	The Car	—N/a	Dubbing
1998	Manthrikumaran	Subhadra	
1999	Pallavur Devanarayanan	Hari's wife	
1999	Jalamarmaram		
1999	Saaphalyam	Prameela	
1999	Stalin Sivadas	—N/a	Dubbing
2000	Mark Antony	—N/a	Dubbing
2000	Aanamuttathe Aangalamar	—N/a	Dubbing
2000	Darling Darling	—N/a	Dubbing
2000	Ival Draupathi	—N/a	Dubbing
2002	India Gate	—N/a	Dubbing
2003	Punarjani	House owner lady	
2003	Pattanathil Sundaran	Nancy	
2003	Japam		
2010	Thathwamasi	Sabari	
2011	The Filmstaar	Janaki	
2014	Njananu party	Seethalakshmi	
2015	Thinkal Muthal Velli Vare	Herself	
2015	Mayapuri 3D	Lady stared	
2018	Sakhavinte Priyasakhi	Indira	

== Television career ==
=== Television serials (partial) ===
Malayalam

Year	Title	Channel	Role	Notes
	Kulam	DD Malayalam		Telefilm
	Deepanalangalku Chuttum	DD Malayalam		Double role
	Seemantham	DD Malayalam		
	Iniyonnu Visramikkatte	DD Malayalam		
1995	Vinodasala	DD Malayalam		
1997	Deshadanapakshi	DD Malayalam		
	Thunchath Achayan	DD Malayalam		
	Gandharvayamam	DD Malayalam		
	Manalnagaram	DD Malayalam		
	Thamarakuzhali	DD Malayalam	Thamara	
1999	Draupadi	DD Malayalam	Draupadi	
	Vamsam	DD Malayalam		
	Karthika		Karthika	
	Asooyappookkal	Kairali TV		
2000	Jwalayayi	DD Malayalam	Thresiamma	Breakthrough role
2000	Manthram	Surya TV		
2001	Sthreejanmam	Surya TV	Mathangi	
2001	Malakhapoovu	DD Malayalam		
2001-2002	Vasundhara Medicals	Asianet		
2003	Seethalakshmi	Asianet		
2004	Kadamattathu Kathanar	Asianet	Madhavi	
2007	Sasneham	Amrita TV		
2005	Swaram	Amrita TV		
2005	Pavithra Bandham	Surya TV		
2006	Veendum Jwalayayi	DD Malayalam	-	Archive footage
2004–2006	Suryaputhri	Asianet	Devayani	
2007	Velankani Mathavu	Surya TV		
2007	Swantham Suryaputhri	Asianet	Devayani	Sequel to Suryaputhri
2007-2008	Shree Krishnaleela	Asianet	Janaki	
2008	Ente Alphonsamma	Asianet	Annaamma	
2008	Vishudha Thomasleeha	Asianet		
2008-2009	Ammathottil	Asianet	Sulochana	
2008-2009	Sree Mahabhagavatham	Asianet		
2009	Devi Mahathyam	Asianet	Subbalakshmi	
2009–2012	Chakkarabharani	Surya TV	Unniyarcha	
2010	Parayi Petta Panthirukulam	Surya TV	Panchami	
2011–2012	Avakashikal	Surya TV	Raziya	
2011–2013	Ilam Thennal Pole	Surya TV	Padmam	
2012-2013	Mohakkadal	Surya TV	Chandra	
2013–2015	Bhagyalekshmi	Surya TV	Ambikadevi	
2013	The Mistake	Kairali TV		Telefilm
2013–2015	Amala	Mazhavil Manorama	Gayathri	
2013	Amma	Asianet		
2013-2014	Ponnu Poloru Pennu	Amrita TV	Rukkamma	
2014	Evide Ellarkum Sugham	Kairali TV	Kattuparambil KochuThresya	
2014	Sooryakaladi Mana	Amrita TV		
2014	Karyam Nissaram	Kairali TV		
2015	Viswaroopam	Flowers		
2016–2017	Krishnathulasi	Mazhavil Manorama	Vijayalakshmi	
2016	Kana Kanmani	Asianet	Thulika	
2016	Anamika	Amrita TV		
2016	Chechiyamma	Surya TV		
2017	Ammuvinte Amma	Mazhavil Manorama	Seetha	
2018	Decemberile Aakasham	Amrita TV	Shanu's Umma	
2018–2019	Thenum Vayambum	Surya TV	Lakshmi	
2019–2020	Sathya Enna Penkutty	Zee Keralam	Vimala	
2020	Sri Lokanarkavilamma	Kaumudy TV	Devi	
2024–2026	Pavithram	Asianet	Kamala	
2026	Pavithram 2	JioHotstar	Kamala	

Other languages

Year	Title	Channel	Role	Language
2015-2016	Kalathu Veedu	Star Vijay	Pattathi	Tamil
2017–2019	Chinna Thambi	Star Vijay	Annalakshmi	Tamil
2019–2020	Kaatrin Mozhi	Star Vijay	Rajeshwari	Tamil
2020–2022	Devatha - Anubandhala Alayam	Star Maa	Devudamma	Telugu
2021–2022	Paavam Ganesan	Star Vijay	Sornam	Tamil
2021	Kasthuri	Star Maa	Devudamma (Cameo)	Telugu
2023–Present	Siragadikka Aasai	Star Vijay	Vijaya	Tamil
2023–2024	Radhaku Neevera Pranam	Zee Telugu	Dharmavathi	Telugu
2023–Present	Gundeninda Gudigantalu	Star Maa	Prabavathi	Telugu

=== Reality shows ===
Year	Title	Channel	Role	Notes
2009–2012	Tharolsavam	Kairali TV	Contestant/Team Leader	
2013	Celebrity Kitchen Magic	Kairali TV	Contestant	Winner : Shared with Nisha Sarang
2013	Nakshathradeepangal	Kairali TV	Team Leader	
2014	Comedy Stars Season 2	Asianet	Mentor	
2019	Jodi Number One	Star Vijay	Contestant	Finalist (Tamil Reality Show)
2022	Mr. and Mrs. Chinnathirai	Star Vijay	Contestant	Eliminated (Tamil Reality Show)

=== TV shows as guest ===
- Ivide Ingannanu Bhai (Mazahvil Manorama)
- Kootukari (DD Malayalam)
- Ormakal Marikkumo (DD Malayalam)
- Annie's Kitchen (Amrita TV)
- Malayali Darbar (Amrita TV)
- Onnum Onnum Moonu (Mazahvil Manorama)
- Kudumbasametham (ACV)
- Manassinoru Mazhavillu (Kairali TV)
- Adukkaliyil Ninnu Arangathekku (Kairali TV)
- Christmas Dishes (Kaumudy TV)
- Amma Ammayiyamma (Kairali TV)
- Ningalkkariyamo (Surya TV)
- Sarigama (Asianet)
- Surya Singer (Kairali TV)
- Valkkannadi (Asianet)
- Nammal Thammil (Asianet)
- Manam Pole Mangalyam (Jaihind TV)
- Smart show (Flowers TV)
- Run Baby Run (Asianet Plus)
- Don't Do Don't Do (Asianet Plus)

=== Music albums ===
- Nilayil Neeradi
- Chaithrasundari
- Karyasiddhi Pooja
- Amme Narayana
- Chandanam Kumkumam Chudala Bhasmarchitham
- Nandhi Orayiram Nandhi

== Drama ==
- Shoorpanaka

== Awards and nominations ==
- 1998: Nana Best actress - (Thamarakuzhali)
- 1999: Kerala State Television Award for Best Actress - (Draupadi)
- 2000: Kerala film critics awards (Gandharayamam)
- 2003: Kerala film critics awards (Jwalayayi)
- 2010: Kerala film audience council award (Parayi petta Pathirukulam)
- 2016: Nominated: Flowers TV Awards – Best Supporting Actress (Krishnathulasi)
- 2018: Vijay Television Awards for Best Mother - (Chinna Thambi)
- 2019: Vijay Television Awards for Best Mamiyar-Fiction
- 2024: 9th Annual Vijay Television Awards for Best Mamiyar - (Siragadikka Aasai)
