= Brahmamudi (TV series) =

2023 Indian Telugu language TV series

- Genre: Romance; Drama; Family drama
- Created by: Bhoomi Creative Works Private Limited
- Based on: Gaatchora
- Developed by: Jyoti Hazra
- Screenplay by: Giridhar Poola
- Directed by: Kumar Pantham
- Starring: Deepika Rangaraju; Manas Nagulapalli; Hamida Khatoon; Srikar Krishna
- Music by: Sai Madhukar; Sai Sailaja
- No. of episodes: 1035

Production
- Producer: Anil Rao Yadagiri
- Editors: Sharukh M.D; Nageshwara Rao
- Camera setup: Multi-camera
- Running time: 22 minutes

Original release
- Network: Star Maa
- Release: 24 January 2023 – present

Brahmamudi is an Indian Telugu-language romance drama television series airing on Star Maa. It is an official remake of the Bengali television series Gaatchora. It premiered on 24 January 2023. Later, a serial named Nindu Manasulu , replacing Karthika Deepam.

== Premise ==
When the mother of three beautiful and talented daughters plans their weddings with suitors from affluent families, situations take an unusual turn.

== Cast ==
=== Main ===
- Deepika Rangaraju as
  - Duggirala Kavya: Raj's wife; Indu's mother; Kanakam and Krishnamurthy's second daughter; Swapna and Appu's sister (2023-2026)
  - Duggirala Indira "Indu" Devi Jr: Kavya and Raj's daughter; Revati and Jagadeesh's niece turned daughter-in-law; Swaraj Jr. cousin turned wife (2026-present)
- Manas Nagulapalli as
  - Duggirala Swaraj "Raj": Kavya's husband; Indu's father; Aparna and Subash's son; Revati's brother (2023-2026)
  - Swaraj "Raju" Jr: Revati and Jagadeesh's son; Kavya and Raj's nephew turned son-in-law; Indu's cousin turned husband (2026-present)

=== Recurring ===
- Sripriya Shreekar as Aparna Duggirala: Raj and Revathi's mother and Subash's wife; Indu and Swaraj Jr. grandmother. (2023-present)
- Vijay as Subash Duggirala: Raj and Revathi's father; Aparna's husband; Seetaramayya and Indira Devi's eldest son; Prakash's elder brother; Rudrani's foster brother; Indu and Swaraj Jr. grandfather. (2023–present)
- Praneetha Sekhar as Rekha: Rudrani's daughter; Rahul's younger sister. (2023–2026)
- Prashanthi as Rekha: (2026-present)
- Hamid Khatoon / Rupa muggalla as Swapna: Kavya and Appu's elder sister; Kanakam and Krishna Murthy's eldest daughter; Rahul's wife; Ishwarya's mother. (2023–present)
- Srikar Krishna as Rahul: Rudrani's son; Rekha's elder brother; Raj, Kalyan, and Pinky's foster cousin; Swapna's husband, Ishwarya's father. (2023–present)
- Diya Siby as Apoorva Duggirala a.k.a. Appu: Swapna and Kavya's younger sister; Kanakam and Krishna Murthy's youngest daughter; Kalyan's 2nd wife; Nandana(Nandu)'s mother. (2023–present)
- Kiran Kanth as Kalyan Duggirala: Raj's cousin; Prakash and Dhanyalakshmi's son; Pinky's elder brother; Rahul and Rekha's foster cousin; Anamika's Ex Husband; Apporva's (Appu) husband; Nandana(Nandu)'s father. (2023–present)
- Neepa Siva as Kanakam a.k.a. Kanakeshwari: Kavya, Swapna and Appu's mother; Krishna Murthy's wife; Meenakshi's younger sister; Aishwarya, Indu and Nandana's grandmother. (2023–present)
- Ragini as Meenakshi: Kanakam's elder sister; Kavya, Swapna and Appu's maternal aunt. (2023–present)
- Sharmitha Gowda as Rudrani: Rahul and Rekha's mother; Seetaramayya and Indira Devi's foster daughter; Subash and Prakash's foster sister; Ishwarya and Lucky, Vamsi's grandmother. (2023–2026)
- Indira Anand as Indira Devi Duggirala, a.k.a. Chitti: Raj, Kalyan, and Pinky's paternal grandmother; Rahul and Rekha's foster maternal grandmother; Seetaramayya's wife; Subash and Prakash's mother; Rudrani's foster mother; Indu and Nandana's great-grandmother; Ishwarya and Lucky, Vamsi's fostergrandmother (2023–present)
- Krishna Murthy Vanjari as Krishna Murthy: Swapna, Kavya and Appu's father; Kanakam's husband; Aishwarya, Indu and Nandana's grandmother. (2023–present)
- Madhuri as Dhanyalakshmi Duggirala: Kalyan and Pinky's mother; Prakash's wife. (2023–present)
- Gopi Naidu as Duggirala Seetaramayya: Raj, Kalyan and Pinky's paternal grandfather; Rahul and Rekha's foster maternal grandfather; Indira Devi's husband; Subash and Prakash's father; Rudrani's foster father. (2023–present)
- Giri Shankar Rayapureddy as Prakash Duggirala: Kalyan and Pinky's father; Seetaramayya and Indira Devi's youngest son; Subash's younger brother; Rudrani's foster brother. (2023–present)
- Sujatha Reddy as Annapoorna: Kavya, Swapna, and Appu's widowed paternal aunt; Krishna Murthy's sister-in-law. (2023–present)
- Nikitha Chowdary as Anamika Duggirala: Kalyan's Ex wife. (2023–present) (Divorced)
- Shabeena as Vennela: Rahul's ex-fiancée; Arundhati's daughter. (2023)
- Bhargavi as Arundhati: Aparna's best friend; Vennela's mother. (2023)
- Siri Vennela as fake Maaya
- Juhi Vadla as Seetha
- Anooramesh as Subramanyam : Anamika's father
- as Sailaja : Anamika's mother
- Jabardast Jeevan as Micheal
- Chandu as Swapna's Friend

== Adaptations ==
Language	Title	Original release	Network(s)	Last aired	Notes
Bengali	Gaatchora গাটছড়া	20 December 2021	Star Jalsha	14 December 2023	Original
Kannada	Katheyondu Shuruvagide ಕಥೆಯೊಂದು ಶುರುವಾಗಿದೆ	28 November 2022	Star Suvarna	3 March 2024	Remake
Hindi	Teri Meri Doriyaann तेरी मेरी डोरियाँ	4 January 2023	StarPlus	14 July 2024	Remake
Telugu	Brahmamudi బ్రహ్మముడి	24 January 2023	Star Maa	Ongoing	Remake
Tamil	Aaha Kalyanam ஆஹா கல்யாணம்	20 March 2023	Star Vijay	3 October 2025	Remake
Malayalam	Patharamattu പത്തരമാറ്റ്	15 May 2023	Asianet	Ongoing	Remake
Marathi	Lakshmichya Paulanni लक्ष्मीच्या पाऊलांनी	20 November 2023	Star Pravah	12 December 2025	Remake
