= Lakshmichya Paulanni =

2023 Indian Marathi language TV series

- Genre: Drama; Romance
- Developed by: Jyoti Hazra
- Directed by: Kalpesh Kumbhar
- Starring: See below
- Theme music composer: A.V. Prafullachandra
- Opening theme: "Lakshmichya Paulanni" by Apoorva Nishad
- Composer: Rohini Ninave
- Country of origin: India
- Original language: Marathi
- No. of episodes: 553

Production
- Producers: Hemant Ruprell; Ranjit Thakur
- Camera setup: Multi-camera
- Running time: 22 minutes
- Production company: Frames Production

Original release
- Network: Star Pravah
- Release: 20 November 2023 – 12 December 2025

Related
- Gaatchora

Lakshmichya Paulanni (transl. By the Footsteps of Lakshmi) is an Indian Marathi language television series which aired on Star Pravah. It stars Akshar Kothari and Isha Keskar in lead roles. It is produced by Hemat Ruprell and Ranjit Thakur under the banner of Frames Production. It premiered from 20 November 2023 by replacing Thipkyanchi Rangoli. It is an official remake of Bengali TV series Gaatchora.

== Plot ==
Belonging to different social spheres, Kala and Adwait initially don’t get along, but destiny ties them into an all-consuming marriage, wherein love triumphs.

=== Mahasangam ===
Date	Series	Ref.
18 May 2025	Thoda Tuza Ani Thoda Maza	
11-15 August 2025	Thoda Tuza Ani Thoda Maza	
11-15 August 2025	Tharala Tar Mag!	

== Cast ==
=== Main ===
- Akshar Kothari as Adwait Pradeep Chandekar
- Isha Keskar as Kalanidhi Dinkar Khare / Kalanidhi Adwait Chandekar (Kala)

=== Recurring ===
Kala's family

- Abhay Khadapkar as Dinkar Khare
- Kishori Ambiye as Sangita Dinkar Khare
- Apurva Sapkal / Sarika Banaraswale as Nayana Dinkar Khare / Nayana Rahul Chandekar
- Rohini Naik as Kajal Dinkar Khare

Adwait's family

- Milind Oak as Bhalchandra Chandekar (Aaba)
- Dhruv Datar / Adwait Kadne as Rahul Chandekar
- Rutwik Talwalkar as Soham Shrikant Chandekar
- Deepali Pansare as Rohini Bhalchandra Chandekar
- Ratnakar Nadkarni as Pradeep Bhalchandra Chandekar
- Manjusha Godse / Pallavi Patwardhan as Saroj Pradeep Chandekar
- Satish Agashe as Shrikant Bhalchandra Chandekar
- Leena Athavale-Datar as Rajani Shrikant Chandekar
- Trushna Chandratre as Anamika Soham Chandekar

=== Cameo Appearances ===
- Nakshatra Medhekar as Sukanya Patil
- Aadesh Bandekar

== Adaptations ==
Language	Title	Original release	Network(s)	Last aired	Notes
Bengali	Gaatchora গাটছড়া	20 December 2021	Star Jalsha	14 December 2023	Original
Kannada	Katheyondu Shuruvagide ಕಥೆಯೊಂದು ಶುರುವಾಗಿದೆ	28 November 2022	Star Suvarna	3 March 2024	Remake
Hindi	Teri Meri Doriyaann तेरी मेरी डोरियाँ	4 January 2023	StarPlus	14 July 2024	Remake
Telugu	Brahmamudi బ్రహ్మముడి	24 January 2023	Star Maa	Ongoing	Remake
Tamil	Aaha Kalyanam ஆஹா கல்யாணம்	20 March 2023	Star Vijay	3 October 2025	Remake
Malayalam	Patharamattu പത്തരമാറ്റ്	15 May 2023	Asianet	Ongoing	Remake
Marathi	Lakshmichya Paulanni लक्ष्मीच्या पाऊलांनी	20 November 2023	Star Pravah	12 December 2025	Remake
Gujarati	Manmelo મનમેળો	2 February 2026	Colors Gujarati	Ongoing	Remake
