= Aaha Kalyanam (TV series) =

2023 Indian television series

- Genre: Romance; Drama
- Developed by: Jyoti Hazra
- Written by: Snigdha Basu (Bengali Adaptation Writer); Sangeetha Mohan; Acropoliis Entertainment
- Screenplay by: Anand Venkat (Episode 1-177); M.R Pon Ilango; M.R Ashokan; C.U Muthuselvan
- Directed by: Francis Kathiravan
- Starring: Mounika; Vikram Shri; Akshaya Kandamuthan; Vibish Aswanth; Gayathri Sri; R. G. Ram; Bhavya Shri
- Theme music composer: Ilayavan
- Country of origin: India
- Original language: Tamil
- No. of seasons: 1
- No. of episodes: 644

Production
- Producers: Rajavelu Rathnavel, Thillainathan.k
- Cinematography: D. Rajesh (Episode 1-206); D.Ramesh; V.Ravi Vasan
- Editors: Dhinesh prakash V.M Prakash Darsartham; P7 Media
- Camera setup: Multi-camera
- Running time: approx.20-22 minutes per episode
- Production company: A Tele Factory

Original release
- Network: Star Vijay; JioHotstar
- Release: 20 March 2023 – 3 October 2025

Related
- Gaatchora

Aaha Kalyanam (transl. Wow! Marriage!) is an Indian Tamil-language television series. The series is an essence remake of Telugu TV series Brahmamudi.

== Plot ==
The story revolves around greedy Kodeeswari, a mother who wishes that someday her daughters would marry into a wealthy family. But whose bond will form with whom, the decision lies in the hands of God. On the important Saraswati Puja holiday in Tamil Nadu, the extravaganza begins. Every year, the famed diamond merchants, the Vedachalams, observe Saraswati Puja. Mahalaxmi, the second daughter of Kodeeswari, has been given this year's task of decorating the entire Puja. Three sisters who reside with their parents. Her mother hopes that one day one of her daughters will marry into a prosperous household. Because of Maha's artistic talent, Kodeeswari intends to accompany her daughters to the Vedachalam house.

On the other side, the Vedachalams are a joint family. The three brothers in the family are adored by their grandparents the most. The youngest brother is Vijay, who writes poems and is an excellent poet. The middle brother Gowtham is a playboy, who is carefree and readily drawn to everyone and also envies Surya and aspires to make sure that he doesn't get the best things in life. Surya is Vedachalam's eldest grandson, who is the most adored and is in charge of his family's business since he is the eldest son.

The story unfolds when Mahalakshmi harbors hatred from her first encounter with Surya, where she demanded wedding selection tickets. Aishwarya, initially chosen to be Surya's wife, decides to refuse the role and opts to be with Gowtham instead.

== Cast ==
=== Main ===
- Mounika as Koteeswari: Dasarathan's wife; Mahalakshmi, Aishwarya and Prabha's mother, who aspires that one day one of her three daughters marries into a rich family. Dhasarathan's wife (2023-2025)
- Vikram Shri as Surya: A jewellery businessman; Raghavan and Rajalaxmi’s son; Gowtham, Vijay, Akshara and Aarthy’s cousin; Mahalakshmi's husband (2023-2025)
- Akshaya Kandamuthan as Mahalakshmi: a talented and hardworking artist and painter; Dasarathan and Koteeswari's younger daughter; Aishwarya's younger and Prabha elder's sister; Surya's wife (2023-2025)
- Vibish Aswanth as Gowtham: a playboy; Chitradevi's son; Akshara's elder brother; Surya, Vijay and Aarthy’s cousin; Aishwarya's husband (2023-2025) (Main Antagonist)
- Gayathri Sri as Aishwarya: Dasarathan and Koteeswari's eldest daughter; Mahalakshmi and Prabha's elder sister; Gowtham's wife (2023-2025)
- R. G. Ram as Vijay: an artist; Raghuvaran and Gayathri's son; Aarthy's elder brother; Surya, Gowtham and Akshara's cousin; Anamika and Prabha's husband; Azhagi's father (2023-2025)
- Bhavya Shri as Prabha: a tomboy; Dasarathan and Koteeswari's youngest daughter; Mahalakshmi and Aishwarya's younger sister; Vijay's second wife (2023-2025)

=== Recurring ===
- Auditor Sridhar / Tarun Master as Vedhachalam
- Kowsalya Senthamarai as Bhanumathi
- CN Ravishankar as Dasarathan: Koteeshwari's husband; Mahalakshmi, Aishwarya and Prabha's father.
- Anitha Venkat as Rajalakshmi: Raghavan's wife; Surya's mother.
- Rohit Ved as Raghavan: Rajalakshmi’s husband, Surya’s father.
- Shilpa Mary Teresa as Chithradevi: who wants to get revenge on Rajalakshmi; Gowtham and Akshara's mother. (Main Antagonist)
- Dr. Jaya as Gayathri: Raghuvaran's wife; Vijay and Aarthy's mother.
- Jairam as Raghuvaran: Gayathri’s husband; Vijay and Aarthy’s father.
- Sherin Janu as Anamika: a gold digger and greedy woman; Vijay's girlfriend and his ex wife. (Antagonist)
- Baby Nynika as Azhagi, Vijay’s daughter; Maha and Surya's adopted daughter.
- Preethiga as Aarthy: Vijay's younger sister; Raghuvaran and Gayathri's daughter.
- Arunima Sudhakar as Akshara: Gowtham's younger sister; Chithradevi's daughter.
- Anjali Varadhan as Baakiyam, Koteeswari's elder sister.
- Vimal Nair Suresh as Vikram
- Yuvan Mayilsamy as Krish

== Production ==
Mounika, who was well known for her acting in old-school movies as well as serials, was cast as Kodeeswari. Jay D'Souza and Darshini Gowda were initially chosen to play the main leads but were replaced by Vikram Shri and Akshaya Kandamuthan. On 6 December 2023, Sherin Janu joined the cast to add a fresh layer to the story line.

== Adaptations ==
Language	Title	Original release	Network(s)	Last aired	Notes
Bengali	Gaatchora গাটছড়া	20 December 2021	Star Jalsha	14 December 2023	Original
Kannada	Katheyondu Shuruvagide ಕಥೆಯೊಂದು ಶುರುವಾಗಿದೆ	28 November 2022	Star Suvarna	3 March 2024	Remake
Hindi	Teri Meri Doriyaann तेरी मेरी डोरियाँ	4 January 2023	StarPlus	14 July 2024	Remake
Telugu	Brahmamudi బ్రహ్మముడి	24 January 2023	Star Maa	Ongoing	Remake
Tamil	Aaha Kalyanam ஆஹா கல்யாணம்	20 March 2023	Star Vijay	3 October 2025	Remake
Malayalam	Patharamattu പത്തരമാറ്റ്	15 May 2023	Asianet	Ongoing	Remake
Marathi	Lakshmichya Paulanni लक्ष्मीच्या पाऊलांनी	20 November 2023	Star Pravah	12 December 2025	Remake

== Crossovers ==
A crossover with Mahanadhi was announced on 4 February, where both families would be staying over at the same resort and would be competing to win 5 lakhs.
