= Patharamattu =

Indian Malayalam-language TV series

- Genre: Romance; Family drama
- Based on: Gaatchora
- Developed by: Jyoti Hazra
- Written by: Pradeep Panicker; Sreekanth V.S
- Story by: Acropoliis Entertainment
- Directed by: Shankar S.K.; Shyju Sukesh
- Starring: Lakshmi Keerthana; Neena Kurup; Vishnu V Nair
- Country of origin: India
- Original language: Malayalam
- No. of episodes: 1035

Production
- Producer: Ramesh Babu
- Production location: Trivandrum
- Cinematography: Vishnu Ulakanath
- Editor: Rajesh Thrissur
- Camera setup: Multi-camera
- Running time: 22 minutes
- Production company: Risun pictures

Original release
- Network: Asianet; JioHotstar
- Release: 15 May 2023 – present

Related
- Gaatchora

Patharamattu (transl. Good Gold) is an Indian Malayalam-language soap opera. The show premiered on 15 May 2023 on Asianet and is available on-demand through JioHotstar. It stars Neena Kurup, Lakshmi Keerthana, Vishnu V Nair, Bindu Ramakrishnan, Kris Venugopal, Tony and Reshmi Rahul in lead roles The series is a loose adaptation of Bengali TV series Gaatchora. It is one of the longest running Malayalam soap opera.

== Plot ==
As the story unfolds on the auspicious occasion of Onam, the paths of Kanakadurga's daughters and the Moorthy brothers intersect. Nayana, with her artistic skills, ventures to decorate the walls of the Moorthy household, accompanied by her covetous mother, Kanakadurga, who harbors hopes of securing prosperous matches for her daughters.

In the opulent setting of the Moorthy residence, the dynamics of the family become apparent. The three brothers, each with their distinct personalities, form the nucleus of the family. Aniruddh, the youngest, captivates with his poetic prowess, while Abhinand exudes a carefree demeanor, often overshadowed by his envy towards Adarsh, the eldest brother and the family's pillar of responsibility.

Amidst the festivities and preparations for Onam, the paths of Nayana and Adarsh cross, igniting a spark that neither anticipated. Nayana's talent and charm draw Adarsh's attention, and a connection begins to bloom, much to the chagrin of Kanakadurga, who sees in Adarsh the embodiment of her desires for her daughters' matrimonial prospects.

Meanwhile, Abhinand, fueled by his envy and desire to outshine his brother, plots to thwart any potential alliance between Nayana and Adarsh, aiming to secure his own interests in the process.

As the event continues and Nayana and Adarsh grow closer, interpersonal conflicts and family expectations emerge, forcing both families to make decisions that affect their futures.

== Cast ==
=== Main ===
- Neena Kurup as Kanakadurga: A greedy woman; Govindan's wife; Navya, Nayana and Nandana's mother.
- Lakshmi Keerthana as Nayana: A Talented Designer ; Govindan and Kanakadurga's daughter; Navya's younger sister; Nandana's elder sister; Adarsh's wife.
- Vishnu V Nair as Adarsh Moorthy a.k.a Aadi/ Aadarshettan: A Gold businessman;Ananathamoorthy and Vasundhara's Eldest grandson, Jayan and Devayani's son; Abhinand, Anirudh's, Avanthika and Athulya's cousin; Nayana's husband; Navya's ex-boyfriend.
- Kris Venugopal as Ananthamoorthy a.k.a Moorthy sir : A Renowned Businessman; Vasundhara's husband; Jayan, Ajayan, Madumadhi'father;Jalaja's foster father;Adarsh, Abhinand, Anirudh, Avanthika and Athulya's Grandfather
- Ambika Nair (EP 2 to 53) / [[Bindu Ramakrishnan]] (EP 54-Present) as Vasundhara moorthy: Ananthamoorthy's wife; Jayan and Ajayan and Madumadhi's mother; Jalaja's foster mother;Adarsh, Abhinand, Anirudh, Avanthika and Athulya's grandmother.

=== Recurring ===
- Reshmi Rahul as Devayani : Jayan's Wife; Adarsh's Mother; Nayana's mother-in-law; Ananthamoorthy's and Vasundhara's Daughter-in-law; Sukumaran Nair's Daughter.
- Tony as Govindan : Kanakadurga's husband; Navya, Nayana and Nandana's father;A Poor Man.
- Anusha Aravindakshan as Navya: A gold digger; Govindan's and Kanakadurga's eldest Daughter; Nayana and Nandana's elder sister; Abhinand's wife; Adarsh's ex-girlfriend;now supports Nayana.
- Akash Murali as Abhinand a.k.a Abhi: A playboy; Ananathamoorthy's second grandson; Jalaja's son; Avanthika's brother; Adarsh, Anirudh and Athulya's cousin; Navya's husband.
- Gopika as Nandana a.k.a Nandu: A tomboy; Govindan and Kanakadurga's youngest daughter; Navya and Nayana's younger sister; Anirudh's crush.
- Vishnu Balakrishnan as Anirudh a.k.a Ani: A kind hearted man; Ananathamoorthy's youngest Grandson; Ajayan and Janaki's son; Athulya's brother; Adarsh, Abhinand and Avanthika's cousin; Anamika's Husband; Nandu's Love Interest.
- Smitha Samuel (EP 1-1035)/ Padma George (EP 1036-present) as Jalaja : Ananthamoorthy and Vasundhara's foster daughter; Abhinand and Avanthika's mother; Jayan, Ajayan, Madhumadhi's sister; who hates Devayani and Nayana.
- Murali Mohan as Jayan (EP 1 -226)/ Yehia Kader(EP 227-Present) as Jayan: Ananthamoorthy and Vasundhara's son; Devayani's husband; Adarsh's father; Jalaja, Ajayan, Madhumadhi's brother.
- Nithya Sasi as Janaki (EP 1 -115)/ Bimitha Titto as Janaki (EP 116 -Present): Ajayan's wife;Ananthamoorthy and Vasundhara's daughter-in-law; Anirudh and Athulya's mother; Supports Nayana;Wants Anamika as her in law
- Manikandan as Ajayan: Ananthamoorthy and Vasundhara's son; Jayan, Jalaja and Madumadhi's brother; Janaki's husband; Anirudh and Athulya's father.
- Greeshma Remesh as Anamika: A greedy lady pretends as rich; Anirudh's first wife.
- Sonu Jacob as Avanthika: Jalaja's daughter; Abhinand's sister; Adarsh, Anirudh’s, Athulya's cousin; Hates Nayana and Navya.
- Karthika Kannan as Vanaja: Kanakadurga's sister; Navya, Nayana and Nandana's Aunty.
- Amith as Jalaja's husband.
- Irene as Madhumadhi: Ananthamoorthy and Vasundhara's daughter; Jayan, Jalaja and Ajayan's sister.Settled in abroad.
- Dhanisha Binis as Revathy : Anamika's mother;Anirudh's Mother-in-law

=== Guest ===
- Akhil Marar as Director (Promo appearance)
- Sreepath as Writer(Promo appearance)
- Reneesha Rahiman (Promo Appearance)
- Subbalakshmi as Muthassi (Promo Appearance)
- Naleef Gea as Kiran Mounaragam serial
- Aishwarya Ramsai as Kalyani Mounaragam serial
- Suresh Pillai as Chef Pillai

== Adaptations ==
Language	Title	Original release	Network(s)	Last aired	Notes
Bengali	Gaatchora গাটছড়া	20 December 2021	Star Jalsha	14 December 2023	Original
Kannada	Katheyondu Shuruvagide ಕಥೆಯೊಂದು ಶುರುವಾಗಿದೆ	28 November 2022	Star Suvarna	3 March 2024	Remake
Hindi	Teri Meri Doriyaann तेरी मेरी डोरियाँ	4 January 2023	StarPlus	14 July 2024	Remake
Telugu	Brahmamudi బ్రహ్మముడి	24 January 2023	Star Maa	Ongoing	Remake
Tamil	Aaha Kalyanam ஆஹா கல்யாணம்	20 March 2023	Star Vijay	3 October 2025	Remake
Malayalam	Patharamattu പത്തരമാറ്റ്	15 May 2023	Asianet	Ongoing	Remake
Marathi	Lakshmichya Paulanni लक्ष्मीच्या पाऊलांनी	20 November 2023	Star Pravah	12 December 2025	Remake

== Crossover ==
Patharamattu had crossover with Mounaragam from 20 November to 24 November 2023 also second Mahasangamam with Mounaragam was telecasted on Valentine's Day, 2024.

== Reception ==
The TRP performance of Patharamattu according to Broadcast Audience Research Council (BARC) is as follows:

Month / Period	Rank	Ref
May 2023	5	
July 2023	5	
September 2023	3	
October 2023	2	
December 2023	2	
January 2024	1	
February 2024	1	
June 2024	2	
September 2024	2	
December 2024	2	
April 2025	1	
May 2025	2	
September 2025	2	
October 2025	3	
November 2025	2	
January 2026	3	
February 2026	4	
March 2026	4	
April 2026	3	
May 2026	4	

TRP ratings have not been published since 2 July 2026, after the Ministry of Information and Broadcasting (India) directed BARC to suspend the publication of television ratings across all genres until its licence is renewed under the Television Ratings Policy, 2026.

== Awards ==
Year	Award	Category	Recipient(s)	Result	Ref.
2026	Asianet Television Awards	Best Second Serial		Won	
2026	Asianet Television Awards	Best Actress (Special Jury)	Lakshmi Keerthana	Won	
2026	Asianet Television Awards	Best Actress in Negative Role (Special Jury)	Anusha Aravindakshan	Won	
2026	Asianet Television Awards	Best Director	Shyju Sukesh	Won	
