= Mulgi Zali Ho =

2020 Indian TV series

- Genre: Social drama Romance
- Created by: Suzana Ghai
- Written by: Sharad Chandra Tripathi
- Screenplay by: Rohini Ninawe
- Directed by: Sachin Deo
- Creative director: Pravin Pavaskar
- Starring: See below
- Theme music composer: Nilesh Moharir
- Opening theme: "Goad Gojiri Sajiri Mulgi Zali Ho" by Jaanvee Prabhu Arora
- Countries of origin: Satara, Maharashtra, India
- Original language: Marathi
- No. of episodes: 686

Production
- Producers: Suzana Ghai; Hemant Ruprel; Ranjit Thakur
- Cinematography: Abhishek Gandhi
- Editors: Shatrujit Singh; Kapil Ubana
- Camera setup: Multi-camera
- Running time: 22 minutes
- Production company: Panorama Entertainment Pvt. Ltd.

Original release
- Network: Star Pravah
- Release: 2 September 2020 – 14 January 2023

Mulgi Zali Ho (transl. The Girl Is Born) is an Indian Marathi-language drama television series that aired on Star Pravah. The show stars Anand Kale, Savita Malpekar, Sharvani Pillai, Kiran Mane (He was thrown out for his abusive behaviour) Divya Pugaonkar and Yogesh Sohoni in lead roles. It was produced by Suzana Ghai, Hemant Ruprell and Ranjit Thakur under the banner of Panorama Entertainment Pvt. Ltd.

== Summary ==
Mulgi Zali Ho is about a girl child Sajiri (Mau) who suffers rejection. Her father Vilas gives some poison to her mother Uma during her pregnancy because he feels that he can't afford to pay for another daughter. As a result, the girl is being born dumb. Mau does all the household works and also goes house to house selling milk. Consequently, she meets a city boy called Shaunak who follows her daily and remembers her as the child who saved him from a car crash from childhood. Mau, only longs for the affection of her cold and distant father and is oblivious to the love bestowed on her by Shaunak.

== Cast ==
=== Main ===
- Divya Pugaonkar as Sajiri "Mau" Patil Jahagirdar: Vilas and Uma's younger daughter; Akshara and Rohan's sister; Shaunak's wife; Gojiri's mother (2020–2023)
  - Maithili Patwardhan as Child Sajiri "Mau" Patil (2020)
- Yogesh Sohoni as Shaunak Jahagirdar: Kedar and Kalyani's son; Divya and Aarya's cousin; Sajiri's husband; Siddhant's best friend; Gojiri's father (2020–2023)

=== Recurring ===
- Aarohi Sambre as Gojiri Jahagirdar: Sajiri and Shaunak's daughter; Anisha and Aaroh's cousin (2022–2023)
- Sharvani Pillai as Uma Patil: Vilas's wife; Akshara, Sajiri and Rohan's mother; Anisha, Aaroh and Gojiri's grandmother (2020–2023)
- Kiran Mane / Anand Alkunte as Vilas Patil: Damayanti's son; Uma's husband; Akshara, Sajiri and Rohan's father; Anisha, Aaroh and Gojiri's grandfather (2020–2022) / (2022–2023)
- Savita Malpekar as Damayanti Patil: Vilas's mother; Akshara, Sajiri and Rohan's grandmother; Anisha, Aaroh and Gojiri's great-grandmother (2020–2023)
- Srujan Deshpande as Rohan Patil: Vilas and Uma's son; Akshara and Sajiri's brother; Aarya's husband; Aaroh's father (2020–2023)
- Apoorva Sapkal / Sheetal Gete as Akshara Patil Bhosale: Vilas and Uma's elder daughter; Sajiri and Rohan's sister; Deepak's widow; Siddhant's wife; Anisha's mother (2020–2021) / (2022–2023)
- Shweta Ambikar-Gore as Aarya Sardeshmukh Patil : Rajan and Vaishali's younger daughter; Divya's sister; Shaunak's cousin; Rohan's wife; Aaroh's mother (2020–2023)
- Siddharth Khirid as Siddhant Bhosale: Revati's son; Shaunak's best friend; Akshara's husband; Anisha's father (2021–2022)
- Soham Salunkhe as Aaroh Patil: Rohan and Aarya's son; Anisha and Gojiri's cousin (2022–2023)
- Vighnesh Joshi as Kedar Jahagirdar: Kalyani's husband; Shaunak's father; Gojiri's grandfather (2021–present)
- Prajakta Kelkar as Kalyani Sardeshmukh Jahagirdar: Suman and Rajan's sister; Kedar's wife; Shaunak's mother; Gojiri's grandmother (2020–2023)
- Anand Kale as Rajan Sardeshmukh: Suman and Kalyani's brother; Vaishali's husband; Divya and Aarya's father; Aaroh's grandfather (2020) / (2020–2022) / (2022–2023) later on last few episodes replaced by Ajay Purkar & Ramesh Rokade
- Pradnya Jawle-Edke as Vaishali Sardeshmukh: Rajan's wife; Divya and Aarya's mother; Aaroh's grandmother (2020–2023)
- Pratiksha Mungekar / Rashmi Joshi as Divya Sardeshmukh: Rajan and Vaishali's elder daughter; Aarya's sister; Shaunak's cousin (2020–2021) / (2021–2023)
- Manjusha Godse as Suman Sardeshmukh: Rajan and Kalyani's sister; Shaunak, Divya and Aarya's aunt (2022–2023)

=== Others ===
- Omprakash Shinde as Bhushan Kamat (2022–2023)
- Swapnil Pawar as Deepak Rane: Akshara's ex-husband (2020–2021)
- Sharmishtha Raut-Desai as Nilima Sawant (2021)
- Prajakta Navnale / Gauri Sonar as Siddhi Gaikwad: Ashok and Seema's daughter; Mau's best friend (2020-2021) / (2021-2022)
- Sudesh Mhashilkar / Santosh Patil as Ashok Gaikwad: Seema's husband; Siddhi's father; Vilas's best friend (2020) / (2020-2022)
- Priti Kadam as Sheetal: Divya's supporter (2020–2021)
- Pankaj Kale as Sunil Shinde: Rajshree's husband; Vilas's best friend (2020–2021)
- Chitra Khare / Manjusha Khetri / Archana Mungekar as Seema Gaikwad: Ashok's wife; Siddhi's mother; Uma's best friend (2020) / (2020–2021) / (2021–2022)
- Devendra Deo as Mr. Bhosale: Siddhant's father (2021)
- Nandini Kulkarni as Revati Bhosale: Siddhant's mother (2021)

== Adaptations ==
Language	Title	Original release	Network(s)	Last aired	Notes
Telugu	Mounaraagam మౌన రాగం	16 September 2018	Star Maa	30 January 2020	Original
Kannada	Mounaragaa ಮೌನ ರಾಗ	17 December 2018	Star Suvarna	14 June 2019	Remake
Tamil	Kaatrin Mozhi காற்றின் மொழி	7 October 2019	Star Vijay	10 April 2021	Remake
Malayalam	Mounaragam മൗനരാഗം	16 December 2019	Asianet	29 May 2026	Remake
Marathi	Mulgi Zali Ho मुलगी झाली हो	2 September 2020	Star Pravah	14 January 2023	Remake
Hindi	Teri Laadli Main तेरी लाडली मैं	5 January 2021	Star Bharat	22 April 2021	Remake

== Reception ==
=== Ratings ===
Week	Year	BARC Viewership		Ref.
Week	Year	TRP	Rank	Ref.
Week 40	2020	3.6	5	
Week 41	2020	3.6	4	
Week 42	2020	4.2	3	
Week 43	2020	4.4	4	
Week 44	2020	4.4	5	
Week 45	2020	5.0	3	
Week 46	2020	4.6	3	
Week 47	2020	5.4	2	
Week 48	2020	5.4	3	
Week 49	2020	4.9	3	
6 December 2020	Maha Episode	3.5	5	
Week 50	2020	5.6	2	
Week 51	2020	5.7	1	
20 December 2020	Maha Episode	4.2	5	
Week 52	2020	6.0	2	
Week 1	2021	5.2	2	
Week 2	2021	5.2	1	
Week 3	2021	5.6	1	
Week 4	2021	5.5	2	
Week 5	2021	6.3	1	
Week 6	2021	5.6	2	
Week 7	2021	5.5	1	
Week 8	2021	5.5	2	
Week 9	2021	5.9	1	
Week 10	2021	6.5	1	
Week 11	2021	6.4	1	
Week 12	2021	6.4	1	
Week 13	2021	6.2	2	
Week 14	2021	6.7	3	
Week 15	2021	6.3	1	
Week 16	2021	5.3	1	
Week 17	2021	5.9	1	
Week 18	2021	6.6	2	
Week 22	2021	6.6	1	
Week 32	2021	6.7	1	

=== Mahaepisode ===
==== 2 hours ====
1. 11 April 2021 (Mau's name ceremony)
2. 21 November 2021 (Mau-Shaunak's marriage)

== Awards ==
Star Pravah Parivar Awards
Year	Category	Recipient	Role
2021	Best Daughter	Divya Pugaonkar	Sajiri
2021	Best Mother	Sharvani Pillai	Uma
2022	Best Husband	Yogesh Sohoni	Shaunak
