= Kaatrin Mozhi (TV series) =

Tamil television drama

- Genre: Drama
- Directed by: Ramkumar Dass D.F Tech
- Starring: Priyanka Jain; Manoharan Krishnan
- Country of origin: India
- Original language: Tamil
- No. of seasons: 1
- No. of episodes: 331

Production
- Producers: Rajavelu, Thillainathan
- Cinematography: A.Ramesh Kumar D.F Tech
- Editor: Raj Anandh
- Running time: Approx. 22 minutes

Original release
- Network: Star Vijay
- Release: 7 October 2019 – 9 April 2021

Related
- Mounaraagam (Telugu)

Kaatrin Mozhi (transl. Language of the Wind) is a 2019 Indian-Tamil language drama television series that aired on Star Vijay. It premiered on 7 October 2019 and ended on 9 April 2021 after 331 episodes. The show stars Priyanka Jain and Sanjeev as well as Manoharan. It is an official remake of the Telugu serial Mounaraagam, which aired on Star Maa. Priyanka M Jain reprises her role in both versions.

== Plot ==
The story revolves around a girl called Kanmani, who has been rejected by her father all her life and as a result, yearns for his affection. Her father Subbu makes her mother Rajeshwari take poison while pregnant because he feels that he cannot afford to pay for another daughter. As a result, Kanmani is born mute. Kanmani does all the household works and also goes house to house selling milk. Consequently, she meets a city boy called Santhosh who follows her daily and remembers her as the child who saved him from a car crash in his childhood. Kanmani only longs for the affection of her cold and distant father and is oblivious to the love bestowed on her by Santhosh.

== Cast ==
=== Main ===
- Priyanka Jain as Kanmani, Subbu and Rajeshwari's daughter, Aishwarya and Raja's sister
  - Ahana Sharma as Young Kanmani (2019)
- Manoharan Krishnan as Subburaj "Subbu", Kanmani's father
- Sanjeev Karthick as Santhosh, Kalyani's son, Priya's brother, Deepika's cousin
- Vikram Shri as Shiva

=== Recurring ===
- Anila Sreekumar / Sripriya as Rajeshwari, Subbu's wife, Kanmani, Raja and Aishwarya's mother
- Swapna Tresa /Premi Venkat as Kalyani, Santhosh and Priya's mother, Raja's mother-in-law, Deepika's aunt, Venkatesh's sister.
- Priyanka as Priya, Santosh's sister, Raja's wife
- Sunitha as Aishwarya, Kanmani's elder sister, Rajesh's wife
- Durairamachandran Suresh as Rajeshekaran "Rajesh", Aishwarya’s husband
- Lokesh as Raja, Kanmani's brother, Priya’s husband
- Srilekha Rajendran as Ganthimathi, Subbu's mother, Kanmani's grandmother
- Androos Jesdas as Venkatesh, Kalyani's brother
- Akila /Dharani as Akhila Venkatesh, Venkatesh's wife, Deepika’s mother
- Chandini Prakash as Deepika, Venkatesh's daughter, Santhosh's lover - who is obsessed with him
- Guru Aravind as Maaran, Santhosh’s cousin brother, a police officer
- Ashok as Gurumoorthy, Kalyani's brother in law, Maaran's father
- Vaishnavi Rajasekaran as Rosy, Kanmani's best friend
- Sai Gopi as Selvam, Kanmani's uncle
- Yogi as Chidambaram

== Adaptations ==
Language	Title	Original release	Network(s)	Last aired	Notes
Telugu	Mounaraagam మౌన రాగం	16 September 2018	Star Maa	30 January 2020	Original
Kannada	Mounaragaa ಮೌನ ರಾಗ	17 December 2018	Star Suvarna	14 June 2019	Remake
Tamil	Kaatrin Mozhi காற்றின் மொழி	7 October 2019	Star Vijay	10 April 2021	Remake
Malayalam	Mounaragam മൗനരാഗം	16 December 2019	Asianet	29 May 2026	Remake
Marathi	Mulgi Zali Ho मुलगी झाली हो	2 September 2020	Star Pravah	14 January 2023	Remake
Hindi	Teri Laadli Main तेरी लाडली मैं	5 January 2021	Star Bharat	22 April 2021	Remake
