= Gaurav Wadhwa =

Indian actor

- Occupation: Actor
- Years active: 2013 – present
- Family: Nirbhay Wadhwa (brother)

Gaurav Wadhwa is an Indian television actor from Jaipur, Rajasthan. He is best known for his roles in Thapki Pyar Ki, Ye Hai Mohabbatein and Yeh Rishta Kya Kehlata Hai. He played the main lead role in Super Sisters - Chalega Pyaar Ka Jaadu.

He used to run a Youtube channel called RiMoRav Vlogs along with his former co-stars Rishi Dev and Mohena Singh. RiMoRav broke up due to some undisclosed reason and the channel was passed on to Rishi Dev with the title Rimorav Vlogs presents Ri vlogs.

He is the younger brother of actor Nirbhay Wadhwa.

== Television ==
Year	Title	Role	Notes
2013	Dance India Dance	Himself	Contestant
2014	Fear Files	Ajay	Episodic role
2015	Emotional Atyachaar		
2015	Adaalat		
2016–2017	Ye Hai Mohabbatein	Sohail Behl / Sohail Chhabra	Antagonist
2017	Thapki Pyar Ki	Samar Kapoor	Parallel male lead protagonist
2017–2018	Yeh Rishta Kya Kehlata Hai	Shubham Goenka / Aryan	Comic Role turned Negative turned Positive
2018	Super Sisters - Chalega Pyar Ka Jaadu	Ashmit Oberoi	Main male lead protagonist
2019	Baavle Utaavle	Salman Khan	
2020 / 2022	Maddam Sir	Reporter Sunny Chaddha	
2020	Naagin 5	Gautam Mathur	
2021	Teri Laadli Main	Akshat	Main male lead protagonist
2023–2024	Pyaar Ka Pehla Adhyaya: Shiv Shakti	Dr. Keertan Kashyap	
2024–2025	Jamai No. 1	Vicky	
2026–present	Oh Humnava Tum Dena Saath Mera	Vivaan Bharadwaj	
