= Gaatchora =

2021 Indian television series

- Genre: Romance; Drama; Family
- Created by: Acropoliis Entertainment
- Developed by: Jyoti Hazra
- Directed by: Soumen Haldar
- Starring: Solanki Roy; Gourab Chatterjee; Sriparna Roy; Shreema Bhattacherjee; Anindya Chattarjee; Anushka Goswami; Riaz Laskar; Katha Chakraborty; Arya Dasgupta; Somashri Bhattacharya; Indranil Mallick
- Country of origin: India
- Original language: Bengali
- No. of seasons: 1
- No. of episodes: 720

Production
- Producers: Snigdha Basu; Sani Ghose Ray
- Camera setup: Multi-camera
- Running time: 22 minutes
- Production company: Acropoliis Entertainment

Original release
- Network: Star Jalsha
- Release: 20 December 2021 – 14 December 2023

Gaatchora (transl. Knot) is an Indian Bengali-language drama television series which premiered on 20 December 2021 on Star Jalsha. It is produced by Snigdha Basu and Sani Ghose Ray under the banner of Acropoliis Entertainment. It features an ensemble cast of Solanki Roy Gourab Chatterjee, Sriparna Roy, Anindya Chatterjee, Shreema Bhattacherjee, Riaz Laskar, Anushka Goswami, Katha Chakraborty, Arya Dasgupta, and Somashri Bhattacharya.

== Plot ==
The story begins by focusing on three middle-class sisters – Khori, Dyuti and Boni whose fates get tied with those of the rich Singha Roy brothers – Riddhiman, Rahul and Kunal. The story then shows the balance of the newlywed couples in their relationship, including family, love and responsibilities.

The story starts with Chandra (a greedy woman), a mother who wishes that one day her three daughters would marry into a wealthy family. But whose bond will form with whom, the decision lies in the hands of God.

On Jagadhatri Puja, the extravaganza begins. The famed diamond merchants, the Singha Roys, observe Jagadhatri Puja every year. Khori, the second daughter of Chandra, has been given the task of decorating the entire Puja this year. The three sisters reside with their parents, and their mother hopes that her daughters will marry into a prosperous household. Because of Khori's artistic talent, Chandra intends to accompany her daughters to the Singha Roy house. Her first daughter Dyuti is a greedy, selfish gold-digger. Because her mother pampers her, she turned out to be a spoilt, unlike her other two sisters who are good and well-mannered by nature. She is opportunistic by nature and often lies to get what she wants, just like her mother.

Chandra's second daughter, Khori is a pretty, intelligent, kind and hardworking artist. She is an independent, outspoken and no-nonsense girl who everyone adores. She manages her father's art shop (Doshokarma Bhandar). Her artwork is very famous around the town. Even though she is very young, she has taken up all her household responsibilities. She loves her sisters more than anything. She sacrificed her art career for her sister Dyuti, even though she was more talented, intelligent and educated than Dyuti, who is very dull in everything.

On the other hand, Banishika, aka Boni, is a tomboy who loves sports and biking. She is the youngest daughter. She studies in college. Just like Khori, she is outspoken and brave. She always supports and stands beside Khori, and her family in times of need.

The Singha Roys are a joint family. They are big diamond merchants. They run a jewellery business under their family name "Singha Roy Jewellers". They are one of the richest families in the town. Three brothers in the family are adored by their grandparents the most. The family's youngest child is named Kunal. He is calm, composed and sweet nature. He is an artist. Rahul Sengupta is a playboy. He is of a carefree nature and envies Riddhiman. He does not belong to the Singha Roy family as he is the grandson of Singha Roy Jewellers manager. But the Singha Roy family still considers him as their own child and loves him. He feels inferior to Riddhiman, so he always tries to trouble him. Riddhiman is Singha Roy's eldest son (he is three months younger than Rahul). Among the three, he is the most adored. He has assumed leadership of his family's business as he is the eldest. Even though he looks haughty from the outside. He is a well-mannered and law abiding man. Just like Khori he is outspoken, as he cannot tolerate injustice and always puts his family first, before himself. He loves his brothers more than anything.

Soon, Khori and Riddhiman meet and develop immense hatred for each other at first sight. But, due to unavoidable circumstances, they are forced to tie the knot and unwillingly marry. Both Khori and Riddhiman refuse to accept the marriage. Even though their ideologies, thoughts, nature and behaviour matches, but still, due to misunderstandings they cannot stand the sight of each other. But very soon Riddhiman falls in love with Khori as he realises that she was always the girl of his dreams. He soon realises that Khori has everything-beauty, values, talent, honesty and courage he always searched for in a girl. How they both fall deeply in love each other, how Khori establishes herself as a famous artist, and how Khori and Riddhi overcome all obstacles in their lives together form the crux of the story. It also shows the parallel lives of Khori's sisters, Dyuti and Boni, and Riddhiman's brothers, Rahul and Kunal and their respective journeys.

=== 2 years later ===
Khori gives birth to a son, named Ayushmaan, while Dyuti gives birth to a daughter, named Disha. But Khori dies during the delivery, due to the complications of her pregnancy, leaving a shock for the family.

=== 20 years later ===
Riddhiman still loves Khori deeply and misses her. He has spent the last twenty years of his life fulfilling Khori's last wish of providing education to children who are talented, but do not have the required resources to complete their dreams, just like her, who had to leave her education to support her family. He holds Ayushmaan responsible for Khori's death, therefore; he has never paid any attention to his son in all these years.

Ayushmaan is an aspiring musician, neglected by his father, Riddhiman. Ayushmaan wishes to win his father's love. Soon, a young, aspiring, pretty and innocent classical singer, named Ganga enters his life, beginning the start of a new chapter of fate. marries Ganga, while Rukmini enters into Riddhimaan's life. Riddhimaan and Rukmini also get married and eventually fall in love. There was an unfolding twisted chapter in the end.

== Cast ==
=== Main ===
- Solanki Roy as Khori Bhattacharya Singha Roy - An artist; International jewellery designer and Head Designer of Singha Roy Jewellers; Chandra and Ahindra's second daughter; Dyuti and Boni's sister; Amit's cousin; Riddhi's late wife; Ayush's mother (2021–2023)
- Gourab Chatterjee as Riddhiman "Riddhi" Singha Roy - businessman; CEO of Singha Roy Jewellers and Dean at KSR Educational Institute; Himanshu and Manjira's son; Kunal, Emon, Gublu, Shayna and Mainak's cousin; Rahul and Kiara's adopted cousin; Dyuti's ex-fiancée; Khori's widower; Rukmini's husband; Ayush's father (2021–2023)
- Sriparna Roy as Dr. Rukmini Sengupta Singha Roy - A psychiatrist; Riddhiman's second wife; Ayush's stepmother
  - Rushali - Rukmini's twin sister (2023)
- Shreema Bhattacherjee as Dyuti Bhattacharya Sengupta - Model, Brand ambassador at Singha Roy Jewellers; Grooming agency owner and professor at KSR Institute; Chandra and Ahindra's eldest daughter; Khori and Boni's sister; Amit's cousin; Riddhiman and Sanjay's ex-fiancée; Rahul's wife; Disha's mother; Rimjhim's stepmother and adoptive mother (2021–2023)
- Anindya Chatterjee as Rahul Sengupta - Paromita and Param's son; Kiara's brother; Mainak and Shayna's cousin; Riddhi, Kunal, Emon and Gublu's adopted cousin; Reema and Shruti's ex-lover; Vinita's ex-fiancé; Julie's ex-husband; Dyuti's husband; Rimjhim and Disha's father (2021–2023)
- Riaz Laskar as Kunal Singha Roy - Sudhanshu and Madhuja's son; Emon's brother; Riddhi, Gublu, Mainak and Shayna's cousin; Rahul and Kiara's adopted cousin; Ayana and Pekham's ex-fiancée; Boni's husband; Tonni and Tinni's father (2021–2023)
- Anushka Goswami as Banhisikha "Boni" Bhattacharya Singha Roy - A crime branch senior officer; Chandra and Ahindra's youngest daughter; Dyuti and Khori's sister; Amit's cousin; Birchandra's ex-fiancée; Kunal's wife; Tonni and Tinni's mother (2021–2023)
- Arya Dasgupta as Ayushmaan "Ayush" Singha Roy - A musician; Riddhi and Khori's son; Rukmini's stepson; Disha, Tonni and Tinni's cousin; Rimjhim's adopted cousin; Ganga's husband; Tridha's ex-fiancé (2023)
- Katha Chakraborty as Ganga Singha Roy - A female priest; first-year student at KSR Educational Institute; An aspiring classical singer; Ayush's wife (2023)

=== Recurring ===
- Rajat Ganguly as Narendranath Singha Roy - Patriarch of Singha Roys'; Kumudini's husband; Himanshu, Debanshu, Sudhanshu and Madhusree's father; Paromita's adoptive father; Riddhi, Kunal, Emon, Shayna, Gublu and Mainak's grandfather; Rahul and Kiara's adoptive grandfather; Ayush, Tonni and Tinni's great-grandfather; Rimjhim and Disha's adoptive great-grandfather (2021–2023)
- Anuradha Roy as Kumudini Singha Roy - Narendranath's wife; Himanshu, Debanshu, Sudhanshu and Madhusree's mother; Paromita's adoptive mother; Riddhi, Kunal, Emon, Gublu, Saina and Mainak's grandmother; Rahul and Kiara's adoptive grandmother; Ayush, Tonni and Tinni's great-grandmother; Rimjhim and Disha's adoptive great-grandmother (2021–2023)
- June Malia as Manjira Singha Roy - Himanshu's wife; Riddhi's mother; Ayush's grandmother (2021–2023)
- Arindam Banerjee as Himanshu Singha Roy - Narendranath and Kumudini's eldest son; Debanshu, Sudhanshu and Madhusree's brother; Paromita's adopted brother; Manjira's husband; Riddhi's father; Ayush's grandfather (2022)
- Arijit Chowdhury as Sudhanshu Singha Roy - Narendranath and Kumudini's youngest son; Himanshu, Debanshu and Madhusree's brother; Paromita's adopted brother; Madhuja's husband; Kunal and Emon's father; Tonni and Tinni's grandfather (2021–2023)
- Sohini Sanyal as Madhuja Singha Roy - Sudhanshu's wife; Kunal and Emon's mother; Tonni and Tinni's grandmother (2021–2023)
- Kaushik Chakraborty as Debanshu Singha Roy alias Mr. D - Narendranath and Kumudini's second son; Himanshu, Sudhanshu and Madhusree's brother; Paromita's adopted brother; Debolina's husband; Mainak and Shayna's father (2022–2023)
- Rajashree Bhowmik as Debolina Sengupta Singha Roy - Param's sister; Debanshu's widow; Mainak and Shayna's mother (2022–2023)
- Shaon Dey as Madhusree Singha Roy Bose - Narendranath and Kumudini's daughter; Himanshu, Debanshu and Sudhanshu's sister; Paromita's adopted sister; Proshun's wife; Gublu's mother (2021–2023)
- Subhrajit Dutta as Proshun Bose - Madhusree's husband; Gublu's father (2022–2023)
- Suchismita Chowdhury as Paromita Singha Roy Sengupta – Narendranath and Kumudini's adopted daughter; Himanshu, Debangshu, Sudhanshu and Madhusree's adopted sister; Param's estranged wife; Rahul and Kiara's mother; Rimjhim and Disha's grandmother (2021–2023)
- Sanchari Mondal / Ankushree Maity as Kiara Sengupta - Admin ar KSR Institution; Paromita and Param's daughter; Rahul's sister; Mainak and Shayna's cousin; Riddhi, Kunal, Emon and Gublu's adopted cousin (2021–2023)
- Shirsha Guha Thakurta as Emon Singha Roy - Sudhanshu and Madhuja's daughter; Kunal's sister; Riddhi, Gublu, Shaina and Mainak's cousin; Rahul and Kiara's adopted cousin (2021–2023)
- Aishik Mukherjee as Writwik "Gublu" Bose - Proshun and Madhusree's son; Riddhi, Kunal, Emon, Shaina and Mainak's cousin; Rahul and Kiara's adopted cousin (2021–2023)
- Suvajit Kar as Dr. Mainak Singha Roy - Debanshu and Debolina's son; Shayna's brother; Riddhi, Rahul, Kunal, Emon, Kiara and Gublu's cousin; he truly loved Khori as even 20 years later he is still unmarried unlike Riddhiman who remarried in old age he chose the path of crime after being betrayed by his mother which ultimately led to losing his love. (2022–2023)
- Arpita Roy as Shayna Singha Roy
- Rana Mitra as Param Sengupta - Debolina's brother; Paromita's estranged husband; Rahul and Kiara's father; Rimjhim and Disha's grandfather (2022–2023)
- Kamalika Majumdar as Rimjhim Roy Chowdhury- Professor at KSR Institute and designer at Singha Roy Jewellers; Rahul and Rima's daughter; Dyuti's adopted daughter; Disha's half-sister; Ayush, Tonni and Tinni's adopted cousin; Samrat's wife (2023)
- Rishabh Bhowmik as Samrat Roy Chowdhury - Rimjhim's husband, Shikha's son, Tridha's brother, Pramit's step-son (2023)
- Renesa Dutta as Disha Sengupta - Dyuti and Rahul's daughter; Rimjhim's half-sister; Ayush, Tonni and Tinni's cousin (2023)
- Taniska Tiwari as Tonni Singha Roy - Boni and Kunal's elder daughter; Tinni's sister; Ayush and Disha's cousin; Rimjhim's adopted cousin (2023)
- Unknown as Tinni Singha Roy - Boni and Kunal's younger daughter; Tonni's sister; Ayush and Disha's cousin; Rimjhim's adopted cousin (2023)
- Tanuka Chatterjee as Chandra Bhattacharya - Ahindra's wife; Dyuti, Khori and Boni's mother; Ayush, Disha, Tonni and Tinni's grandmother (2021–2023)
- Ratan Sarkhel as Ahindra Bhattacharya - Ashok's brother; Chandra's husband; Dyuti, Khori and Boni's father; Ayush, Disha, Tonni and Tinni's grandfather (2021–2023)
- Moumita Chakraborty as Chandra's elder sister (2021–2022)
- Unknown as Amit Bhattacharya - Ashok and Jethimaa's son; Dyuti, Khori and Boni's cousin (2022)
- Sonali Chakraborty as Mrs. Bhattacharya aka Jethimaa - Ashok's wife; Amit's mother (2021–2022)
- Phalguni Chatterjee / Sankar Debnath as Ashok Bhattacharya - A renowned artist; Ahindra's brother; Jethimaa's husband; Amit's father (2022)

=== Others ===
- Laboni Ghosh as Tridha Raychowdhury, Ayushman's former love interest and ex-fiancé. (2023)
- Ayush Adhikari as Rocket - Khori's helper; Boni's disciple (2023)
- Suparna Patra as Rima - Rahul's ex-lover; Rimjhim's biological mother; Khori's friend. (2023)
- Jasmine Roy as Tani - An undercover officer appointed by Riddhi; Riddhi and Khori's well-wisher (2022–2023)
- Biresh Chakrabarty as Birchandra "Bir" Basu - Boni's junior colleague and ex-fiancé; Pekhom's love interest (2023)
- Aditi Ghosh as Pamella aka Pekhom - Peter's niece; Birchandra's love interest; Kunal's ex-fiancé
- Rumpa Chatterjee as Kamini - Bindi's aunt (2023)
- Suban Roy as Mridul - Bindi's ex-fiancée (2023)
- Ankita Brahma as Julie - Rahul's ex-wife (2023)
- Piyali Sasmal as Vinita Lahiri - Rahul's ex-fiancé (2023)
- Sonalisa Das as Ayana Dutta - Kunal's ex fiancé (2023)
- Sunanda Chakraborty as Shruti Biswas - A reporter and correspondent of daily news and top media channel; Rahul's ex-lover (2023)
- Kunal Banerjee as Inspector Soumya Chatterjee - Boni's Trainer and Mentor; Emon's love interest (2022)
- Bodhisatva Majumder as Bimal - Kumudini's childhood friend (2023)
- Anirban Bhattacharya as Priest - Ganga's grandfather (2023)
- Indranil Mallick as Rudra Roy - Rahul's friend (2023)
- Somashree Bhattacharya as Bindi Mitra - Former research scholar of KSR Institute, Riddhiman's former fake wife (2023)

== Reception ==
=== Critical reception ===
The pair of Gourab Chatterjee and Solanki Roy as Riddhiman and Khori is one of the most popular pair of Bengali Television. Their chemistry in the show is so popular in the audience and media that the audience popularly named them "Khoriddhi". It was Solanki-Gourab's reel chemistry, that turned out to be the USP of the show. Protagonists, Khori and Riddhiman became one of the most popular jodis on Bengali TV and their chemistry worked in show's favour too.

Gaatchora was consistently praised for its different storyline and concept because of which it consistently gained top position in TRP list. The show's storyline never featured love triangles, numerous marriage tracks, extra-marital affairs, adultery, 3rd person involvement, kitchen politics as other shows had, because of which it always ruled the TRP charts. From beginning people liked the different storyline and the headstrong characters portrayed by the actors.

In Bengali serials, the main attraction is usually considered the female lead character. However even Riddhiman's character was so popular that during the track of Kunal's wedding where his character was not seen for a few episodes in show, the show's TRP immediately declined, at that time Gaatchora was dominating the top spot in TRP but with departure of Riddhiman it lost the top spot in TRP list. Audience demanded for the return of the Riddhiman on social media as they missed Riddhiman. Because of the huge demand of fans Gourab Chatterjee had shoot the scenes on his phone with help of his wife from abroad and send it via WhatsApp. In this series, each and every character got immense popularity including villains like Rahul and Dyuti. Later Solanki Roy left the show because of her health problems. As Khori's character was very popular among the audience and in mainstream media, fans boycotted the serial after Solanki Roy's exit, and the show received immense backlash.

=== Viewership ===
Gaatchora became the most watched television series on Bengal television. The series soon became the top rated Bengali television program garnering a record viewership and maintaining the first position consistently in the BARC's weekly viewership charts.

=== In popular culture ===
The character of Khori became very popular and it produced a new fashion trend among women in Bengal called the "Khori Look". Khori was seen wearing a handloom saree with hand designed fabric blouses and with it, subtle, light, yet eye-catching silver jewellery. The trend went viral and is in demand in the market.

== Adaptations ==
Language	Title	Original release	Network(s)	Last aired	Notes
Bengali	Gaatchora গাটছড়া	20 December 2021	Star Jalsha	14 December 2023	Original
Kannada	Katheyondu Shuruvagide ಕಥೆಯೊಂದು ಶುರುವಾಗಿದೆ	28 November 2022	Star Suvarna	3 March 2024	Remake
Hindi	Teri Meri Doriyaann तेरी मेरी डोरियाँ	4 January 2023	StarPlus	14 July 2024	Remake
Telugu	Brahmamudi బ్రహ్మముడి	24 January 2023	Star Maa	Ongoing	Remake
Tamil	Aaha Kalyanam ஆஹா கல்யாணம்	20 March 2023	Star Vijay	3 October 2025	Remake
Malayalam	Patharamattu പത്തരമാറ്റ്	15 May 2023	Asianet	Ongoing	Remake
Marathi	Lakshmichya Paulanni लक्ष्मीच्या पाऊलांनी	20 November 2023	Star Pravah	12 December 2025	Remake
Kannada	Gauri Kalyana ಗೌರಿ ಕಲ್ಯಾಣ	27 January 2026	Colors Kannada	Ongoing	Remake
Gujarati	Manmelo મનમેળો	2 February 2026	Colors Gujarati	Ongoing	Remake
