= Mounaraagam (Telugu TV series) =

Indian Telugu television series

- Genre: Drama
- Written by: Dialogues; Mullapudi Seshkumar & Jajula Nookarajunaidu
- Screenplay by: Uday Bhagavathula; Jarugula Ramarao
- Directed by: RK Malineni
- Starring: Priyanka Jain; Shiva Kumar Marihal; Sakshi Shiva; Anil Allam
- Theme music composer: Mallik MVK
- Country of origin: India
- Original language: Telugu
- No. of episodes: 662

Production
- Producer: S N Swamy
- Cinematography: Narnikollu Chandra Shekar
- Editors: S Venkateswara Rao; Pavan Kumar Gattu
- Production company: Flying Eagle

Original release
- Network: Star Maa
- Release: 16 September 2018 – 30 January 2021

Mounaraagam is an Indian Telugu language television drama series that aired on Star Maa from 16 September 2018 to 30 January 2021. It stars Priyanka Jain, Shiva Kumar Marihal and Anil Allam in lead roles.

== Synopsis ==
The story is about a mute child named Ammulu, who is rejected by her father Seenaiah and her grandmother Kanthamma as they believed that she brings misfortune. Ammulu's mother Neelaveni raised her separately in a hatch outside their house while both her sister Vasantha and her brother Chakri are raised in the house. Seenaiah is a mechanic and he loves his son Chakri a lot, but he never even looks at Ammulu. Although Ammulu cannot speak, she loves drawing and painting.

On the other hand, Nandini is a good-hearted rich CEO who raised her son Ankith and daughter Lucky on her own. Nandini's brother Vishnu is evil and wants to acquire the entire property by marrying off his daughter Sarayu to Ankith. Nandini admires her brother and is unaware of Vishnu and his wife Kalpavalli's intentions. However, Ankith who returns from US, falls in love with Ammulu for her good heart and kind nature. He also realizes that she saved his life in childhood and even offers her a job at his company. Ammulu's best friend Rosie conveys Ammulu's disability condition and her family situation to Ankith, after which Ankith started caring for her even more and eventually Ammulu reciprocated his feelings.

Meanwhile, Ankith's sister Lucky becomes pregnant due to Chakri. Nandini and Seenaiah decide to get them married despite not agreeing with their relationship. Seenaiah eventually realizes bad deeds committed by Chakri and starts distancing himself from his son. Due to this, Chakri along with Vishnu, Sarayu and Kalpavalli hatched multiple plans to create further rifts between Nandini and Seenaiah. Though Nandini initially admired Ammulu for her good deeds, she eventually came to know that she is disabled and dismissed Ankith's marriage proposal with her, as it reminded her of her husband who betrayed and left her. Moreover, Vishnu and Sarayu manipulated Nandini to further hate Ammulu and Seenaiah by creating fake scenarios due to which Nandini thinks that Ammulu is trying to trap Ankith for money like her brother Chakri did with Lucky.

Meanwhile, Ankith's best friend Bharath, who's also the new police officer in their town, starts loving Ammulu. As Chakri and Vasantha's marriages are already completed, Seenaiah fixes Ammulu's marriage with Bharath to get rid of her. However, after Bharath's evil intentions are revealed, the marriage gets cancelled. Also, Kanthamma realizes her mistakes and finally apologizes and accepts Ammulu as her granddaughter. Meanwhile both Ankith and Lucky figure out the evil intentions of Vishnu and start warning Nandini, but she refuses to believe them. After some series of events, Ammulu and Ankith get married, against the wishes of both Nandini and Seenaiah, but supported by Neelaveni. After the marriage, Ankith tries to get Seenaiah's approval by leaving his CEO life and leading a simple life working in a mechanic shed. Meanwhile, Vishnu unable to watch his daughter Sarayu's pain of rejection, plans to kill Ammulu but unfortunately Ankith dies in that boat accident planned by him. Everyone believes Ankith died but Ammulu doesn't accept it. Nandini, who is devastated by Ankith's death, blames Ammulu and her family, due to Vishnu's manipulation. Lucky tries to convince Nandini to not blame Ammulu but fails.

Eventually Seenaiah finally realises his mistakes after Ammulu saves his life after an accident and accepts Ammulu as his daughter by asking her to forgive him for everything since childhood. Also Vasantha, who earlier worked to feed information to Sarayu for money, changes after Ammulu solves her marital problem and unites Vasantha with her distant husband Dhanush. At that time, Anurag, a blind person comes to their village and helps Ammulu to get over Ankith by encouraging her to pursue her dream as an artist and starts a project “Mounaraagam”. Seenaiah also encourages Ammulu to pursue her dream and even fixes her marriage with Anurag. However one day, Ammulu falls unconscious on the road and was found by doctor Sunitha. After performing some tests, Sunitha declares that Ammulu has cancer and she might not live longer. Ammulu asks Sunitha to not tell this to anyone.

After couple of days, Ankith returns alive, much to everyone's surprise. As Ammulu believes she has less time, she distances herself with Ankith by pretending to be close with Anurag and tries to fix Ankith's marriage with his childhood friend Pooja who returned from abroad and has feelings for him. Though Pooja feels happy, she also feels a little guilty about Ammulu. Eventually, both Seenaiah and Ankith discover Ammulu's illness and pretend to act as if everything is normal in front of Neelaveni and rest of the family. Seenaiah finally approves Ankith as his son-in-law and apologizes to Anurag for giving him hopes. However Anurag reveals that he is Ankith's half-brother as both of them were born to same father but were separated in childhood. Anurag sacrifices his love on Ammulu for Ankith and wishes them the best before leaving. Ammulu insists Ankith and Pooja to marry and they both unwillingly agree for sake of Ammulu's happiness. Sarayu who also discovered that Ammulu has less time, questions Ammulu as to why she didn't pick her instead of Pooja. Ammulu tells her that Pooja is better than Sarayu as she is kind, pure and good-hearted. Frustrated, Sarayu tries to marry Ankith forcefully by kidnapping him but Ankith clarifies that he will never be able to love her or even Pooja and he will stay single forever if Ammulu dies. He also explains that love is a pure feeling which cannot be forced and Sarayu was brainwashed by Vishnu and Kalpavalli since childhood and that she is not actually in love with him. Sarayu finally realizes Ankith's love for Ammulu and she finally moves on by letting him go.

Meanwhile, Pooja's father Krishna Prasad, who is a renowned doctor, discovers that there is a treatment to Ammulu's illness. However, Vishnu along with brainwashed Chakri kidnap Ammulu to stop Ankith and Pooja's marriage for Ankith’s property. But after kidnapping Ammulu, Vishnu decides to kill both Chakri and Ammulu, due to which, Chakri realizes that Vishnu manipulated and used him as a pawn to get his revenge on Ammulu. Chakri finally realizes his sister's value and apologizes to Ammulu and tries to fight back Vishnu. Meanwhile Ankith, Seenaiah and Nandini track Vishnu's location with Sarayu's help and save Chakri and Ammulu. Nandini finally understands Vishnu's true colours and bad intentions, and gets him arrested and even Sarayu starts hating her father. All of them admit Ammulu at a hospital and Chakri pays the hospital fee using the money earned from Ammulu and Anurag's project “Mounaraagam” by selling Ammulu's drawings. Because of this, both Seenaiah and Ankith forgive Chakri. Then, Krishna Prasad operates on Ammulu and successfully saves her life. Finally Ammulu and Ankith happily reunite along with Lucky, Chakri, Seenaiah, Neelaveni, Kanthamma, Nandini, Pooja, and Krishna Prasad.

== Cast ==
=== Main ===
- Priyanka Jain as Ammulu: Seenaiah and Neelaveni's daughter; Ankith's wife; Kanthamma’s granddaughter; Vasantha and Chakri’s sister; Lucky’s sister-in-law
  - Baby Sahruda as Young Ammulu
- Shivakumar Marihal as Ankith: Nandini's son; Ammulu's husband; Lucky’s brother; Chakri’s brother-in-law
- Anil Allam as Seenaiah (2020-2021): Neelaveni's husband; Ammulu, Vasantha and Chakri's father; Kanthamma’s son; Lucky, Ankith and Dhanush’s father-in-law
  - Saakshi Siva (2018-2020) as Seenaiah

=== Recurring ===
- Sirisha as Neelaveni: Seenaiah's wife; Ammulu, Vasantha and Chakri's mother; Kanthamma’s daughter-in-law; Lucky, Ankith and Dhanush’s mother-in-law
- Sai Lalitha (Later) as Nandini: Ankith and Lucky's mother; Vishnu’s sister; Ammulu and Chakri’s mother-in-law; Sarayu’s aunt; Anurag’s step-mother
  - Swathi (Earlier) as Nandini
- Haritha Udaykumar (Later) as Vasantha: Ammulu and Chakri’s sister; Dhanush’s wife; Seenaiah and Neelaveni’s eldest daughter
  - Shravani (Earlier) as Vasantha
- Neema Singh as Lucky: Ankith's sister; Chakri's wife; Nandini’s daughter; Ammulu’s sister-in-law
- Draksharamam Saroja as Kanthamma: Seenaiah's mother; Ammulu, Vasantha and Chakri's grandmother; Neelaveni’s mother-in-law
- Malineni Hemanth as Chakri: Ammulu and Vasantha’s brother; Seenaiah and Neelaveni’s son; Lucky's husband; Nandini's son-in-law; Ankith's brother-in-law
- Rajeev Ravichandra as Bharath: Ankith’s friend; Loves Ammulu with bad intentions
- Antara Swarnakar as Pooja: Krishna Prasad’s daughter; Ankith's childhood friend and one-sided lover; Ammulu’s well-wisher
- Neha Deshpande (Later) as Sarayu: Vishnu and Kalpavalli’s daughter; Nandini’s niece; Ankith's cousin and ex-fiancée; Ammulu’s rival; loves Ankith with bad intentions
  - Vaishali Raj (Earlier) as Sarayu
- Chakri as Doctor Krishna Prasad: Pooja's Father; Ammulu’s doctor
- Pavan Ravindra as Anurag: Ankith and Lucky’s half-brother; Nandini’s step-son; Ammulu's one-sided lover
- Jaya Lalita as Village head / Dharmakartha
- Jyothi Reddy as Doctor Sunitha
- Rajendra RK as Vishnu: Sarayu's father; Nandini’s brother; Kalpavalli’s husband; Ankith and Lucky’s uncle
- Roopa Reddy as Kalpavalli: Vishnu's wife; Sarayu's mother; Nandini’s sister-in-law; Ankith and Lucky’s aunt
- Naresh Lolla as Dhanush: Vasantha’s husband; Chakri's friend and brother-in-law; Seenaiah and Neelaveni’s son-in-law; Chakri and Ammulu’s brother-in-law
- Renu Qiyara as Rosie: Joseph and Stella’s daughter; Ammulu’s best friend since childhood
- Srinivas Bhogireddy as Joseph: Seenaiah's best friend; Stella’s husband; Rosie’s father; Ammulu’s father-figure
- Sandhya Rani as Stella: Joseph's wife; Rosie’s mother
- Rithu Chowdary as Gayathri: Sarayu’s friend

=== Cameo appearance ===
- Sujitha as Sita (from Vadinamma serial)

== Adaptations ==
Language	Title	Original release	Network(s)	Last aired	Notes
Telugu	Mounaraagam మౌన రాగం	16 September 2018	Star Maa	30 January 2021	Original
Kannada	Mounaragaa ಮೌನ ರಾಗ	17 December 2018	Star Suvarna	14 June 2019	Remake
Tamil	Kaatrin Mozhi காற்றின் மொழி	7 October 2019	Star Vijay	10 April 2021	Remake
Malayalam	Mounaragam മൗനരാഗം	16 December 2019	Asianet	29 May 2026	Remake
Marathi	Mulgi Zali Ho मुलगी झाली हो	2 September 2020	Star Pravah	14 January 2023	Remake
Hindi	Teri Laadli Main तेरी लाडली मैं	5 January 2021	Star Bharat	22 April 2021	Remake

== Reception ==
The series had a third placing in the TRP charts for a week in 2020.

== Title song ==
All music is composed by Mallik MVK.

No.	Title	Singer(s)	Length
1.	"Mounaraagam Title song "	Sunitha Upadrashta	2:26
Total length:			2:26
