= Mounaragam (Malayalam TV series) =

Malayalam-language Indian television soap opera

- Genre: Romance; Thriller Drama
- Written by: Pradeep Panicker
- Directed by: Manu Sudhakaran / Harrison
- Presented by: Anoop Menon
- Narrated by: Prof. Aliyaar
- Theme music composer: Saanadh George
- Composer: Rajeev Aattukal
- Country of origin: India
- Original language: Malayalam
- No. of seasons: 1
- No. of episodes: 1700

Production
- Producer: S. Ramesh Babu
- Cinematography: Arun Krishna
- Editor: Rajesh Thrissure
- Camera setup: Multi-camera
- Running time: 21 minutes approx
- Production company: Risun Pictures

Original release
- Network: Asianet; Disney+ Hotstar; JioHotstar (India)
- Release: 16 December 2019 – 29 May 2026

Related
- Mulgi Zali Ho; Kaatrin Mozhi

Mounaragam (transl. Silent Symphony) is a Malayalam-language Indian television soap opera that aired on Asianet and streams on JioHotstar in India. It is inspired from Telugu television series Mouna Raagam, which aired on Star Maa. It is one of the longest running Malayalam television soap opera. After successful run for over six years, the show ended on 29 May 2026.

== Plot ==
The series follows the life of Kalyani, the mute daughter of Deepa and Prakashan. Prakashan, who despises daughters and longs for a son, ill-treats Kalyani and favors his son Vikramadhityan, while Deepa and her brother Dayanand stand by her. Despite her disability and hardships, Kalyani grows up to be talented and kind-hearted, but continues to face neglect and humiliation from her father and grandmother.

As a young woman, Kalyani reunites with Kiran, a wealthy businessman whose life she had saved during childhood. Their bond gradually turns into love, but Kiran’s cousin Sarayu—his former fiancée—grows jealous and vows revenge, supported by her parents Rahul and Shari. Meanwhile, Vikram deceives Kiran’s sister Sonia into marriage, creating further conflict between the two families.

The story traces Kalyani’s journey as she faces conspiracies, forced marriage attempts, and repeated opposition from her own family as well as Kiran’s. With the support of Kiran, Sonia, and their niece Paru, Kalyani becomes stronger and more confident. After overcoming numerous obstacles, betrayals, and tragedies, Kalyani and Kiran finally marry. The series continues with their struggles against Sarayu and others, while Kalyani gradually earns her place as a respected woman, regains her voice through surgery, and builds a new life with Kiran.

After a series of events, Lekshmi, Prakashan's first wife, comes to Kerala from Chennai with her daughter, Karthika, the first born of Prakashan who abandoned the baby in isolated land. They plan with Kalyani and Kiran to halt Prakashan and Bhanumathi. Vikram tries his best to close the chapter of his wealthy sisters. Later, Bhanumathi and Prakashan change to good minded beings, shortly before Deepa's death. Nearing the end, Vikram is killed by Prakashan and the story ends as he is released from jail after five years.

== Cast ==
=== Main cast ===
- Aishwarya Ramsai as Kalyani Kiran: A Former mute girl and the daughter of Prakashan and Deepa, sister of Kadambari and Vikram, the wife of Kiran, and the mother of Kalyan.
- Naleef Gea as Kiran Chandrasenan: The son of Chandrasenan and Roopa, brother of Sonia, Sarayu's cousin and Kalyani's husband. Kiran is Kalyan's father and Sarayu's ex-fiancé.
- Darshana Das (2019 to 2020) & (2022 to 2026)
  - Madhusri (2020 to 2021)
  - Pratheeksha G Pradeep (2021 to 2022) as Sarayu: One of Manohar's wives, daughter of Rahul, and the foster daughter of Shari and biological daughter of Thara, cousin of Kiran and Sonia, and Kiran's ex-fiancée.

=== Recurring cast ===
- Balaji Sarma as Prakashan. Bhanumathi's son. Karthika, Kalyani, Kadambari and Vikram's father, Deepa's husband; Lakshmi's ex-husband who formerly hates girl children; now supports Kalyani. Grandfather of Kalyan and Charu.
- Firosh as Chandrasenan/CS: Roopa's husband, Kiran and Soni's father, MD of Sonyray group of companies. Grandfather of Kalyan and Charu.
- Sethu Lakshmi as Bhanumathi: Prakashan's mother, Deepa and Lakshmi's mother-in-law, Karthika, Kalyani, Kadambari and Vikram's grandmother who early hates Kalyani. Great-grandmother of Kalyan and Charu
- Anju Nair as Roopa: Kiran and Sonia's mother, Kalyani's and Albert's mother-in-law, Rahul's sister, Shari's sister-in-law and Sarayu's aunt; Chandrasenan's wife. Grandmother of Kalyan and Charu.
- Sabitha Nair (episode 214 to 1532) as Deepa: Prakash's wife, Kalyani, Vikram and Kadambari's mother. Grandmother of Kalyan and Charu.(Dead)
  - Padmini Jagadeesh as Deepa Prakashan (episode 1 to 213)
- Beena Antony (Episode 177 to 1700) as Shari Rahul: Rahul's wife, Sarayu's foster-mother, Kiran and Soniya's aunt.
  - Saritha Balakrishnan as Shari (episode 12 to 150) for 120 episodes
- Rajani Murali as Lakshmi, Prakashan's first wife. Gangadharan and Karthika's mother.
- Varsha Evaliya as Karthika Prakashan, Prakashan and Lakshmi's daughter. Kadambari, Kalyani and Vikram's half-sister.
- Rithika Krishna (episode 873 to 1700) as Sonia a.k.a. Soni: Kiran's younger sister, Vikram's ex-wife, Charu's mother, Albert's wife
  - Shwetha Mahalakshmi as Sonia (episode 93 to 863)
  - Avani Nair as Sonia (episode 10 to 92)
- Sabu Varghese as Rahul: Kiran and Sonia's uncle, Sarayu's father, Shari's husband, Thara's baby-daddy and Roopa's brother and wants to separate Kiran and Kalyani and wants Kiran to marry Sarayu and inherit the wealth of Roopa.
- Jithu Venugopal as Manohar/Riyas/Victor/Rony, a fraud who married many women including Sarayu
- Firosh Mohan as Gangaprasad, Karthika's brother, a local goon
- Kalyan Khanna as Vikramadithyan a.k.a. Vikram: Kalyani and Kadambari's younger brother, Prakashan and Deepa's son and Sonia's ex-husband, Charu's father. Kalyan's uncle.
- Arun Mohan as Ratheeshan: Kadambari's husband.
- Shari Krishnan as Kadambari Ratheesh: Kalyani and Vikram's elder sister and Ratheesh's wife (2022–2026)
  - Anjusree Bhadran as Kadambari Ratheesh (2019 - 2021)
- Baby Janavi Suresh as Kalyan, Son of Kiran and Kalyani.
- Jelina P as Parukkutty, Kiran's and Sonia's niece, daughter of DYSP Dineshan and supports Kalyani and wants Kiran to marry Kalyani
- Roshan Mathew John as Thara: Mute maid at Roopa's house, Rahul's illegitimate girlfriend, Sarayu's biological mother
- Aagneya /Natalia Isha, Albert's daughter
- Karthik Prasad as Baiju: A mentally challenged youth who dreams of marrying Kalyani. Later, he supports Kalyani.
- Kiran Dev as Albert (Alby): Soni's husband. Step father of Charu. Businessman
- ___ as Chanthu, a local goon
- Mini Sreekumar as Yamini: Domestic help of Roopa
- Swathi Thara as Daisy: Sarayu's friend
- Sreekala as Bhargavi Amma: An old woman who offered Kalyani a job in her thattukada. Former Domestic help/Care taker of Kalyani and Sonia.
- Kottayam Rasheed as Dayanandan, Deepa's brother
- Jose K George as Xavier
- Asha Nair as Xavier's wife
- Thamburu as Linda: Kalyani's one of the best friend
- Haridas as Dasan, Prakashan friend
- Baby Parthavi as Young Kalyani
- Thirumala Ramachandran as Balan, Prakashan's Bestfriend
- Reshma R Nair as Dona Kuriakose : Manohar's girlfriend
- Aseena Yousuf as Kalyani's friend
- Dr. D Kris Venugopal as Kuriakose
  - Leading businessman and best friend of CS
- Dayandan as CS's assistant
- Sarayu As Vrinda
  - Neighbour of Kiran, Kalyan, Manohar & Sarayu
- Sruthisha Nair as Jumana, one of Manohar's wives
- Sreelakshmi Haridas as Dr. Swathi, Sony's friend who is pretending to love Vikram
- Amboori Jayan as advocate
- Niyas Musaliyar as Doctor Pious
- Ashraf as Dr. Thomas
- Suresh as Sanal
- Suresh Babu as Hari
- Kollam Shah as Rajappan
- Athira Madhav as Saranya
- Harisree Martin as Samuel
- Anjusha Gopi as Nisha
- Sariga S as Meghna
- Vishnu Nair as Adarsh
- Lakshmi Keerthana as Nayana
- Jishnu Vijayan as Varun/ Vandana : Manohar's disguised girlfriend, Dona's husband.
- Aneesh Kailas as Velu
- Varsha Vinod as Amalu
- Vijayan Karanthoor as Mooppan

=== Guest appearances ===
- Meera Vasudevan as Sumithra (episodes 145–147) for Sonia's marriage
- Sai Kiran as Mohan Kumar (episodes 179–182) for Kalyani's Birthday
- Gauri P. Krishnan as Anumol (episodes 179–182) for Kalyani's Birthday
- Chef Suresh Pillai as Cookery show judge (Onam episode 2021) for the Promotion of Brahmins curry powder
- Shweta Menon as Herself (episodes 557–562) for Kiran - Kalyani's marriage
- Sreethu Krishnan as herself (episodes 548–550)
- Manisha Mahesh as herself (episodes 548–550)
- Sandra Babu as Malavika Nandini (episodes 548–550)
- Avanthika Mohan as Sreya Nandini (episodes 548–550)

== Adaptations ==
Language	Title	Original release	Network(s)	Last aired	Notes
Telugu	Mounaraagam మౌన రాగం	16 September 2018	Star Maa	30 January 2021	Original
Kannada	Mounaragaa ಮೌನ ರಾಗ	17 December 2018	Star Suvarna	14 June 2019	Remake
Tamil	Kaatrin Mozhi காற்றின் மொழி	7 October 2019	Star Vijay	10 April 2021	Remake
Malayalam	Mounaragam മൗനരാഗം	17 December 2019	Asianet	29 May 2026	Remake
Marathi	Mulgi Zali Ho मुलगी झाली हो	2 September 2020	Star Pravah	14 January 2023	Remake
Hindi	Teri Laadli Main तेरी लाडली मैं	5 January 2021	Star Bharat	22 April 2021	Remake

== Reception ==
=== Airing history ===
Mounaragam premiered on 16 December 2019 on Asianet at 9:00 PM replacing Kasthooriman to 9:30 PM.

Following a temporary suspension of production during the COVID-19 pandemic, the series was shifted to the 8:30 PM from 15 June 2020. Between 2020 and 2023, Asianet introduced several new serials, including Padatha Painkili and Thoovalsparsham, in the 8:30 PM slot, replacing Mounaragam to 9:00 PM. However, due to low reception for new entries, Mounaragam was repeatedly reassigned to the 8:30 PM slot during this period.

With the launch of the series Patharamattu on 15 May 2023, the show was moved back to the 9:00 PM slot.

For the launch of Janakiyudeyum Abhiyudeyum Veedu, Mounaragam was shifted to the 9:30 PM slot. Within a few weeks, the series was moved back to the 9:00 PM slot due to low reception of the new series.

With the introduction of the series Pavithram, Mounaragam was shifted to the 9:30 PM slot from 16 December 2024.

From 3 August 2025, due to launch of Bigg Boss Malayalam Season 7, Mounaragam was moved to evening slot 6:00 PM

On 27 April 2026, the series is again shifted to Night 10.30 PM replacing with Nagarani, it eventually ended on 29 May 2026.

=== Viewership ===
The TRP performance of Mounaragam according to Broadcast Audience Research Council (BARC) is as follows:

Month / Period	Rank	Ref
February 2020	5	
July 2020	2	
September 2020	5	
October 2020	4	
January 2021	4	
May 2021	3	
August 2021	4	
October 2021	5	
November 2021	4	
March 2022	4	
July 2022	3	
November 2022	5	
January 2023	1	
February 2023	1	
May 2023	4	
June 2023	2	
July 2023	1	
September 2023	1	
October 2023	5	
December 2023	3	
January 2024	2	
February 2024	2	
June 2024	5	
August 2024	4	
September 2024	3	
December 2024	6	
April 2025	5	
May 2025	5	
July 2025	5	
September 2025	7	
October 2025	8	
November 2025	9	
April 2026	10	
May 2026	8	

== Crossover ==
Mounaragam had a crossover episode with Patharamattu from November 20 to November 24, 2023. The second crossover, a special Mahasangamam episode, aired on February 14, 2024, as a one-hour Valentine's Day special.
