= Nirbhay Wadhwa =

Indian actor

- Occupation: Actor
- Years active: 2013–present
- Spouse: Preeti Wadhwa (m. 2011)
- Children: 1
- Family: Gaurav Wadhwa (brother)

Nirbhay Wadhwa is an Indian film and television actor. He had appeared in Star Plus' Mahabharat, where he played the negative role of Dushasana. He also played Hanuman in Sankatmochan Mahabali Hanuman and Shrimad Ramayan, and also portrayed Kaalasur in Qayamat Ki Raat.

== Early life ==
Nirbhay Wadhwa is from Jaipur. He is the older brother of actor Gaurav Wadhwa. Nirbhay spent his childhood in Bikaner, Rajasthan. He did his schooling from St. Edmund's School, Jaipur. He later earned Bachelor's Degree in Arts from Rajasthan University. Nirbhay was always passionate to make his career in the field of entertainment and he did a lot of hard work so far to achieve his position. Nirbhay is also a pet lover and social worker and associate with the " Help in Suffering" NGO in Jaipur.

== Career ==
Wadhwa had appeared in Star Plus television's mythological drama Mahabharat, where he played the negative role of Dushasana. Wadhwa made his Bollywood debut as cameo in 2014 Hindi film Main Aur Mr. Riight, where he played the role of a struggling actor. He also played the role of Hakim Khan Sur in Sony TV's historical drama Bharat Ka Veer Putra – Maharana Pratap. He played the lead antagonist in Qayamat Ki Raat on Star Plus. Nirbhay also played the role of Pehlwan Durjan in Tenali Rama. He played the role of Mahishasur in the show Vighnaharta Ganesha and also played the role of Hanuman in Sankatmochan Mahabali Hanuman which were telecasted on Sony Entertainment Television. He again got the role of Hanuman in Shani (TV series). On Colors in Mahakali — Anth Hi Aarambh Hai, he played the role of Mahishasur. He is currently playing the role of Hanuman in Shrimad Ramayan.

== Personal life ==
On 28 June 2011, Nirbhay married Preeti Wadhwa. They have a daughter born in 2015.

== Filmography ==
=== Television ===
Year	Title	Role	Notes
2013–2014	Mahabharat	Dushasana	
2014–2015	Bharat Ka Veer Putra – Maharana Pratap	Hakim Khan Suri	
2015–2017	Sankatmochan Mahabali Hanuman	Hanuman	
2017	Tenali Rama	Pehelwan Durjan	
2017	Partners Trouble Ho Gayi Double	Leader of Chaddi Gang	
2017–2018	Mahakali– Anth hi Aarambh hai	Mahishasura	
2018	Vighnaharta Ganesha	Mahishasura	
2021	Vighnaharta Ganesha	Hanuman	
2018	Karmaphal Daata Shani	Hanuman	
2018	Qayamat Ki Raat	Kaalasur	
2019	Paramavatar Shri Krishna	Maharaj Kalyavan	
2020	Kahat Hanuman Jai Shree Ram	Maharaj Vali	
2022	Jai Hanuman – Sankatmochan Naam Tiharo	Maharaj Vali	
2022	Jai Hanuman – Sankatmochan Naam Tiharo	Maharaj Sugreev	
2024–2025	Shrimad Ramayan	Hanuman	
2025	Ganesh Kartikey	Sindhurasur	

=== Web series ===
Year	Show	Role	Channel
2020	Shrikant Bashir	Sampson	SonyLIV
