= Qayamat Ki Raat =

Indian Hindi-language supernatural television drama

- Genre: Supernatural; Horror
- Created by: Ekta Kapoor
- Developed by: Ekta Kapoor
- Written by: Anamik (dialogues)
- Screenplay by: Anil Nagpal; Mrinal Tripathi
- Story by: Anil Nagpal; Kavita Nagpal
- Starring: Karishma Tanna; Vivek Dahiya; Sumit Bhardwaj; Madhurima Tuli; Nirbhay Wadhwa; Saurish Singh Athwal
- Theme music composer: Lalit Sen; Nawab Arzoo
- Country of origin: India
- Original language: Hindi
- No. of seasons: 1
- No. of episodes: 72

Production
- Producers: Ekta Kapoor; Shobha Kapoor
- Camera setup: Multi-camera
- Running time: 45 minutes
- Production company: Balaji Telefilms

Original release
- Network: StarPlus
- Release: 23 June 2018 – 17 February 2019

Qayamat Ki Raat (English: The Night of Doom) is an Indian supernatural drama television series that aired on Star Plus. It premiered on 23 June 2018. The series was co-produced by Ekta Kapoor and Shobha Kapoor under their banner Balaji Telefilms. The show stars Karishma Tanna, Vivek Dahiya, Nirbhay Wadhwa, Saurish Singh Athwal and Madhurima Tuli.

== Plot ==
Set in the year of 1993, the story begins with a newly wedded couple, Suhasini and Mahendar going to a Ram temple at Ramnamgarh to hand over Suhasini's wedding chain to the idol of Lord Rama and receive the deity's blessings. The train stops at the station and Mahendar's loyal driver Birju comes to fetch them and to drive them till the temple. Not realising that Birju is possessed, they follow him. Suhasini and Mahendar enter the temple when suddenly, Mahendar recalls that they have forgotten the wedding chain in the car so Mahendar goes to fetch it, asking Suhasini to stay here. Meanwhile, Suhasini witnesses strange eerie occurrences in the temple premises while exploring the region which includes absence of a bell as well as any idol of Lord Rama inside the temple and passing of a cat out of nowhere. She trips off a door and falls down the stairs that lead into the temple's basement that happens to be a Tantrik named Kalasur's lair. As soon as Kalasur sees her, he gladly welcomes her inside and offers to spend the night with her and make love. This frightens Suhasini and she yells for help. This is followed by a struggle by Suhasini to escape the Tantrik's clutches and a duel between him and her husband Mahendar. Suhasini runs away screaming for help. While fighting with the Tantrik, Mahendar loses consciousness and Kalasur shape-shifts into Mahendar's form.

Meanwhile, Suhasini reaches the palace of Thakur Prithvi Singh Suryavanshi and asks them to save her husband from Kalasur. Just then, Kalasur arrives there in Mahendar's disguise and Suhasini, scared out of her wits, pleads everybody to get the Tantrik at the temple arrested. As everyone goes in search of the Tantrik, Kalasur takes Suhasini in a bedroom inside the palace and tries making love to her. But luckily Suhasini sees the reflection of the Tantrik in the glass ceiling and pushes him away. As she reaches for the door to exit the house, the Thakur's family returns with the real Mahendar, a priest and few village men because they had found an unconscious Mahendar at the temple instead of the Tantrik. The priest traps Kalasur inside a circular ring of holy ash on the floor. The Tantrik still doesn't accept defeat. He keeps insisting on making love to Suhasini which irks Mahendar to no extent. He threatens to burn Kalasur into ashes, but the latter remarks that his ashes would rise in air and coalesce to resurrect him. Next, Mahendar threatens to bury the Tantrik alive, but he says that his skeleton would rise from underneath the ground to revive him. Mahendar then strangles Kalasur and chokes him, but Kalasur manages to get an upper hand and lifts Mahendar up in the air grabbing his throat. Suhasini requests Kalasur to leave Mahendar unharmed but he pays no heed and insists on having a one-night stand with her. This invokes the ferocity and strength inside Suhasini who lifts up a villager's axe and chops off Kalasur's right arm that had grabbed Mahendar's throat. Next, she cuts the Tantrik's head off. As a result, the beheaded Tantrik curses Suhasini's family that since he couldn't make love to Suhasini, no woman from her family must consummate her marriage hereafter or else death would befall on her. He also remarks that Suhasini would never know the reason why he had chosen her and wanted to make love to her. The priest then orders Lakha, a villager to lock the Tantrik's arm, head and body separately and hide them in different places so that the Tantrik can never assimilate his body parts together and resurrect himself.

25 years later

In Mumbai, two girls "Karuna and Gauri", who are revealed to be sisters, are shown walking to their car. They reach their home and are revealed to be Mahendar and Suhasini's daughters but Suhasini is nowhere to be seen and instead and Karuna and Gauri's stepmother Damini is shown to be Mahendar's wife presently. Thakur Prithvi Singh Suryavanshi is shown at Mahendar's house with his wife Uma and brother Vikram to discuss a matrimonial alliance between his brother Vikram's son Aman and Mahendar's elder daughter Karuna. While Karuna is adamant about not giving consent to marriage, her grandmother (also Mahendra's mother) is worried about the fact that Karuna would have to stay at Ramnamgarh after the marriage. Mahendar convinces his mother and Karuna to visit Ramnamgarh and meet the prospective groom. Meanwhile, Vikram's son Aman is shown to have returned from the United States with his cousin brother Rajvardhan "Raj" Singh Suryavanshi (Prithvi and Uma's son). They invade the taxi that had been already booked by Karuna and Gauri to go to the railway station. Since Gauri asks the boys to get out of the taxi, an enraged Raj punctures the taxi's tyres and they all have to walk all the way to the station. They all board the train, but they get off the train to buy some things on the platform. This leads to them missing the train and being forced to walk to Ramnamgarh through the woods. In the woods, Karuna falls into a quicksand and while trying to get her out of it Gauri accidentally touches Kalasur's severed arm that had been buried under the quicksand. This awakens the Tantrik and he is now able to control his severed arm telepathically.

Raj and others then manage to rescue Karuna and take her to the old and desolate temple that used to be the Tantrik's lair 25 years ago. On seeing Karuna distraught and weak due to a near death experience, Gauri insists on taking her inside the temple. Her decision is strongly challenged by Raj as he is sceptical of the temple, but Gauri breaks the holy threads wound over the gate and enters the temple's premises. Seeing this through the gem of the ring on his hand, Kalasur directs his hand to reach for the temple door and find Birju who is revealed to have been possessed by the Tantrik and locked in a room in the temple's basement since 25 years. Meanwhile, Gauri searches for help in the temple, while Raj and Aman have left to find a way out of the woods. Gauri accidentally trips herself and falls down the stairs to the basement, exactly like the way Suhasini had. She is startled to notice the possessed Birju who later attacks her with an axe. She struggles to save herself but is cornered by Birju. Just when he is about to kill Gauri, a man arrives and grabs his hand firmly. The two then fight while Gauri yells for help. Meanwhile, Raj and Aman while on their way to seek help, meet Vikram along with Mahendra and his family. They enquire the two and learn that Suhasini's daughters are left alone at the cursed temple. They all hurry back to the temple. Raj with the help of the man who had been fighting with Birju manages to save Gauri. The man is revealed to be Dharam, Raj's friend whose father Lakha is rendered mentally challenged due to reasons unknown to anyone. Dharam brings Birju before the villagers. The villagers demand Birju be burnt alive. Birju is tied to a tree by the priest and just then lightning strikes the tree and it catches fire. Kalasur who knew all the events up till now is scared for the safety of his arm which had earlier merged with Birju's arm. Suddenly Thakur Prithvi arrives with the policemen and gets Birju arrested. He takes away Mahendra and his family to his palace with himself after dismissing the villagers.

Meanwhile, the family is busy arranging the marriage of Karuna and Aman. But Gauri and Raj team up to break the alliance since Karuna and Aman are not in love with each other. Karuna and Aman eventually fall in love and Raj and Gauri start to get feelings for each other. When the Tantrik finally finds his body, all hell breaks loose in Karuna and Gauri's life. He causes an accident with Aman and Karuna and both go missing. The police find Karuna alive, but not Aman's body. Karuna is shown to not be herself, but a toy of the Tantrik. She does his bidding and plans to kill Raj. The Tantrik now sets his eyes on Gauri, and Karuna gets engaged to Raj. Meanwhile, Raj and Gauri fall in love and Gauri learns about Karuna not being herself. Gauri tries to tell family members about her but in vain. To protect Raj from Karuna and upon realising her feelings for him, Gauri marries him. Kalasur kills Gauri's father and blame goes on Raj as a part of a misunderstanding created by Karuna and Kalasur. Kalasur with his new aides Mishka, Ajay and Karuna is successful in straining Gauri's relationship with other family members and Raj.

Gauri learns that they have hidden Raj's soul in the netherworld and has to find three keys to get it. Gauri meets Rajlakshmi, her look-a-like and maternal grandmother. She tells her about 'shaligram'. However she refuses to tell its location as it would be a threat to Gauri's life. Gauri manages in get defeat and finish off Karuna and get two keys. Gauri is finally able to rescue Raj and expose Kalasur in front of the whole family. They defeat Kalasur but his hand is saved by his aide who is none other than Uma, Raj's mother. It is revealed that Uma is Kalasur's sister and she killed Rajlakshmi because she learned of her identity. Uma transformed Raj into Kalasur by mixing his blood with the latter's.

One month later

Raj and Gauri are romancing and enjoy a sweet moment. Uma comes in Raj and Gauri's room and gives them the keys of the farmhouse. She asks them to go to the farm house. Raj and Gauri share a romantic moment but at the time Raj becomes a Kalasur. Now, Raj's real mother secretly helps Gauri to heal Raj. Uma finds the shaligram and make Kalasur alive. Raj and his family learns about Savitri and Uma. Uma with Kalasur tries to kill the Thakur family. Luckily, Thakurs and Dharam shift to another house but Kalasur and Uma mistaken that they were dead. After some incidents, Dharam gets killed by Kalasur and Raj and Gauri kill Kalasur and buries his ashes. They die without completing their love story.

28 years later

Raj and Gauri are reborn as Vaidehi Khanna and Raghav Sharma. They have frequent visions about their past. Vaidehi is a successful business woman and Raghav is yet to be successful architect. They meet at an auction, the palace at Ramnamgarth for sale. Sanjana is a witch born from Kalasur's life force. She tries to marry Raghav so that the child from their union can revive Kalasur and rule all three worlds. After a series of incidents, Raghav and Vaidehi find about their past and connection and decide to marry. In between the ceremony the witch, using Raghav's sister as bait kidnaps Raghav. Vaidehi completes the rituals with Raghav's photo and recognises herself as his wife. She, with the help of priest, finds Raghav and frees him. She finds a way to kill Kalasur and Sanjana. They then reach a temple and find a divine knife. Vaidhehi kills Sanjana and rescues Raghav They both kill him for good.. Vaidehi and Raghav get properly married and the story ends on a good note.

== Cast ==
=== Main ===
- Karishma Tanna as
  - Gauri Singh Suryavanshi: Suhasini and Mahendra's daughter; Damini's adoptive daughter; Karuna and Abhay's sister; Vikas's half-sister; Raj's wife (2018)
  - Rajlaxmi Chauhan: Suhasini's mother; Karuna, Gauri and Abhay's maternal grandmother (2018)
  - Vaidehi Sharma (née Khanna): Gauri's reincarnations; Shekhar's daughter; Raghav's wife (2018–2019)
- Vivek Dahiya as
  - Rajvardhan "Raj" Singh Suryavanshi: Savitri and Prithvi's son; Uma's foster son; Aditi's brother; Gauri's husband; Dharam's best friend; (2018)
  - Raghav Sharma: Raj's reincarnation; Karan's friend; Vaidehi's husband (2018–2019)
- Nirbhay Wadhwa/Saurish Singh Atwal as Kaalasur Taantrik (2018–2019)
- Madhurima Tuli as Sanjana (2018–2019)

=== Recurring ===
- Dipika Kakar as Suhasini Chauhan Thakur: Rajlaxmi's daughter; Mahendra's wife; Karuna, Gauri and Abhay's mother (2018)
- Sumit Bhardwaj as Dharam Choudhary: Lakha's son; Raj's best friend (2018)
- Dalljiet Kaur as
  - Karuna Thakur Suryavanshi: Suhasini and Mahendra's daughter; Damini's adoptive daughter; Gauri and Abhay's sister; Vikas's half-sister; Aman's wife (2018)
  - Zinda Laash: Karuna's lookalike; Kaalasur's accomplice (2018)
- Sagar Saini as Shekhar Khanna: Rushali's son; Vaidehi's father (2018–2019)
- Farida Patel Venkat as Rushali Khanna: Shekhar's mother; Vaidehi's grandmother (2018–2019)
- Manish Khanna as Prithvi Singh Suryavanshi: Vikram's brother; Mahendra, Sumeet and Lakha's close friend; Savitri and Uma's husband; Raj and Aditi's father (2018)
- Shweta Gautam as Savitri Suryavanshi: Prithvi's first wife; Raj's mother (2018)
- Papiya Sengupta as Uma Suryavanshi: Kaalasur's sister; Prithvi's second wife; Aditi's mother; Raj's foster mother (2018)
- Rini Das as Hawk Avni: Kaalasur's accomplice (2018)
- Apara Mehta Jariwala as Madhuri Thakur: Mahendra and Sumeet's mother; Karuna, Gauri, Abhay, Ananya and Vikas's paternal grandmother (2018)
- Sheetal Maulik as Mamta Thakur: Sumeet's wife; Ananya's mother (2018)
- Mehul Nisar as Vikram Singh Suryavanshi: Prithvi's brother; Mahendra, Sumeet and Lakha's close friend; Meenakshi's husband; Aman and Nishtha's father (2018)
- Rohit Choudhary as Viraaj Kukreja: Sanjana's accomplice (2018–2019)
- Arpit Chaudhary as Abhay Thakur: Suhasini and Mahendra's son; Damini's adoptive son; Karuna and Gauri's brother; Vikas's half-brother (2018)
- Priyamvada Pandey as Meenakshi Suryavanshi: Vikram's wife; Aman and Nishtha's mother (2018)
- Mala Salariya as Nishtha Suryavanshi: Meenakshi and Vikram's daughter; Aman's sister (2018)
- Karan Kaushal Sharma as Pandit Vedprakash Shastri: A protector of the Suryavanshis and Thakurs; Vidyut's father (2018)
- Hemakshi Sharma as Gurumaa (2018)
- Divya Kushwaha as Aditi Singh Suryavanshi: Savitri and Prithvi's daughter; Uma's foster daughter; Raj's sister (2018)
- Gaurav Alugh as Vikaas Thakur: Damini and Mahendra's son; Karuna, Gauri and Abhay's half-brother (2018)
- Kingkini Bhattacharya as Yakshini/Mishka (2018)
- Karam Rajpal as
  - Ajay Pratap Singh (2018)
  - Kaalasur 2: Ajay's lookalike; Kaalasur's accomplice (2018)
- Manorama Bhattishyam as Sorceress Jugni (2018)
- Abhinav Kohli as Mahendra Thakur: Madhuri's son; Sumeet's brother; Prithvi, Vikram and Lakha's close friend; Suhasini and Damini's husband; Karuna, Gauri, Abhay and Vikas's father (2018)
- Rajeev Saxena as Pandit Sukhanand Abhinava: Priest at Vaidehi and Raghav's wedding (2019)
- Sumit Verma as Vidyut Shastri: Vedprakash's son (2018)
- Gaurav Walia as Lakha Choudhary: Dharam's father; Prithvi, Vikram, Mahendra and Sumeet's close friend (2018)
- Manraj Singh as Aman Singh Suryavanshi: Meenakshi and Vikram's son; Nishtha's brother; Karuna's husband (2018)
- Ahmad Harhash as Shivraj Singh Rathore (2018–2019)

== Production ==
It was expected to go off air in December 2018 but got an extension and ended in February 2019. Reports stated, "Qayamat (Ki Raat) has got an extension and will be taking a leap. Some characters will bid adieu to the show while Karishma and Vivek will be retained."

== Reception ==
The show opened with 5.6 million impressions in its opening week.

India Today acclaimed that this series had a gripping storyline and also praised Abhinav Kohli, Karishma Tanna, Dipika Kakar and Vivek Dahiya for portrayal of their characters perfectly.

The Times of India stated, "The show became an instant hit among the viewers due to its unique concept and picturisation. The supernatural shows are liked by the audiences due to the lead pair that creates magic with their performances on-screen. The shows not just show evil or horrifying things but also strike a perfect balance between good and bad."

== See also ==
- List of Hindi horror shows
