= Teri Laadli Main =

2021 Indian television series

- Genre: Drama
- Created by: Suzana Ghai
- Written by: Sharad Chandra Tripathi
- Screenplay by: Rohini Ninawe
- Directed by: Sohit K. Sarkar Thakuri
- Creative director: Nishtha Yadav
- Starring: Mayuri Kapadane; Hemangi Kavi; Gaurav Wadhwa
- Theme music composer: Nilesh Moharir; Alvis Valentine; Anuj Mathews
- Country of origin: India
- Original language: Hindi
- No. of seasons: 1
- No. of episodes: 78

Production
- Producers: Suzana Ghai; Hemant Ruprel; Ranjit Thakur
- Cinematography: Abhishek Gandhi
- Editors: Shatrujit Singh; Kapil Ubana
- Camera setup: Multi-camera
- Running time: 22–25 minutes
- Production company: Panorama Entertainment Pvt. Ltd

Original release
- Network: Star Bharat
- Release: 5 January – 22 April 2021

Related
- Mouna Raagam (Telugu series)

Teri Laadli Main (transl. I Am Your Affectionate) is an Indian television drama series that aired from 5 January 2021 till 22 April 2021 on Star Bharat. Produced by Panorama Entertainment, it stars Hemangi Kavi, Mayuri Kapadane and Gaurav Wadhwa. The series is remake of Star Maa's Telugu series Mouna Raagam. The series went off air abruptly without conclusion on 22 April 2021 due to its very low TRP ratings and due to global COVID-19 pandemic situation.

== Plot ==
Urmila and Surender are couples who live with Surender's mother, Durga. Urmila is a kind hearted woman who cares for everyone whereas, Surender is a cruel man who finds girls to be a burden. The couple had a girl child Gauri. Urmila becomes pregnant with a girl child for the second time, but this time Surender decides to kill the baby since he can't afford for another child. He with the help of Durga poisons Urmila. Luckily, the child survives but is born mute due to the poison. Surender and his mother is terrified since the child is a girl and is mute. Surender consults an astrologer who predicts that the child would bring misfortune to the family. Everybody are terrified, as a result, they mistreat the child except Urmila who feels they should care for her. They name the girl Bitti. Urmila gets pregnant for the third time and gives birth to a boy named Yash. As time passes by, Gauri used to get ignored and Yash used to get all the love. Bitti however, was totally treated as a burden.

Bitti grows up into a young woman. Though mute, she is talented and intelligent but still, longs for father's affection. One day, in her childhood, Bitti had saved the life of a rich boy named Akshat. Akshat now feels that he lives because of Bitti and becomes fond of her. Eventually, he decides to employ her as a cook in his construction company. In the end, both falls for each other leading to Akshat abandoning his friend Sakshi. In fact, Akshat doesn't know that Bitti is mute and thinks that she is silence fasting. Bitti decides to reveal the bitter truth to him. Akshat is shocked at first but decides to transform her into a bold young woman. Sakshi is heartbroken that Akshat left her and becomes jealous of Bitti. She vows her revenge on her.

== Cast ==
=== Main ===
- Mayuri Kapadane as Bitti Kumar: Urmila and Surender's second daughter; Gauri and Yash's sister (2021)
  - Maithali Patwardhan as Young Bitti (2021)
- Gaurav Wadhwa as Akshat: Bitti and Sakshi's love interest; Vaishali's son; Richa's elder brother (2021)
  - Aarav Wadhwa as Young Akshat (2021)
- Hemangi Kavi as Urmila Kumar: Surender's wife; Bitti, Gauri and Yash's mother (2021)
- Pankaj Singh as Surender Kumar: Bitti, Gauri and Yash's father (2021)

=== Recurring ===
- Nisha Nagpal as Sakshi; Supriya's daughter; Akshat's friend who loves him (2021)
  - Swati Katyal as Young Sakshi (2021)
- Neelima Singh as Vaishali: Akshat and Richa's mother; a woman who hates disability due to her tragic past (2021)
- Neena Cheema as Durga Kumar: Surender's mother; Bitti, Gauri and Yash's paternal grandmother (2021)
- Vivaan Singh Rajput as Yash Kumar: Urmila and Surender's only son; Bitti and Gauri's younger brother (2021)
- Shruti Anand as Gauri Kumar; Urmila and Surender's eldest daughter; Bitti and Yash's elder sister (2021)
- Mehul Nisar as Ashok: Surender's friend; Urmila and Bitti's well-wisher (2021)
- Payal Gupta as Siddhi: Ashok's daughter and Bitti's best–friend (2021)
- Rudra Kaushish Supriya's husband and Sakshi's father (2021)
- Anshu Varshney as Supriya: Sakshi's mother (2021)
- Palak Jain as Richa (2021)
- Prince Sharma as Raju (2021)

== Production ==
=== Casting ===
Child actor Harshita Ojha was first approached to play young Bitti, but was replaced by Maithali Patwardhan who played the same role in Mulgi Zali Ho, the Marathi version of the series. Hemangi Kavi was cast to play the role of Bitti's mother.

=== Release ===
The first promo of the series was released on 14 December 2020, featuring Hemangi Kavi and Pankaj Singh. The next promo was released on 23 December 2020, featuring Mayuri Kapadane, Hemangi Kavi and Pankaj Singh.

== Adaptations ==
Language	Title	Original release	Network(s)	Last aired	Notes
Telugu	Mounaraagam మౌన రాగం	16 September 2018	Star Maa	30 January 2020	Original
Kannada	Mounaragaa ಮೌನ ರಾಗ	17 December 2018	Star Suvarna	14 June 2019	Remake
Tamil	Kaatrin Mozhi காற்றின் மொழி	7 October 2019	Star Vijay	10 April 2021	Remake
Malayalam	Mounaragam മൗനരാഗം	16 December 2019	Asianet	29 May 2026	Remake
Marathi	Mulgi Zali Ho मुलगी झाली हो	2 September 2020	Star Pravah	14 January 2023	Remake
Hindi	Teri Laadli Main तेरी लाडली मैं	5 January 2021	Star Bharat	22 April 2021	Remake
