= Teri Meri Doriyaann =

Indian television series

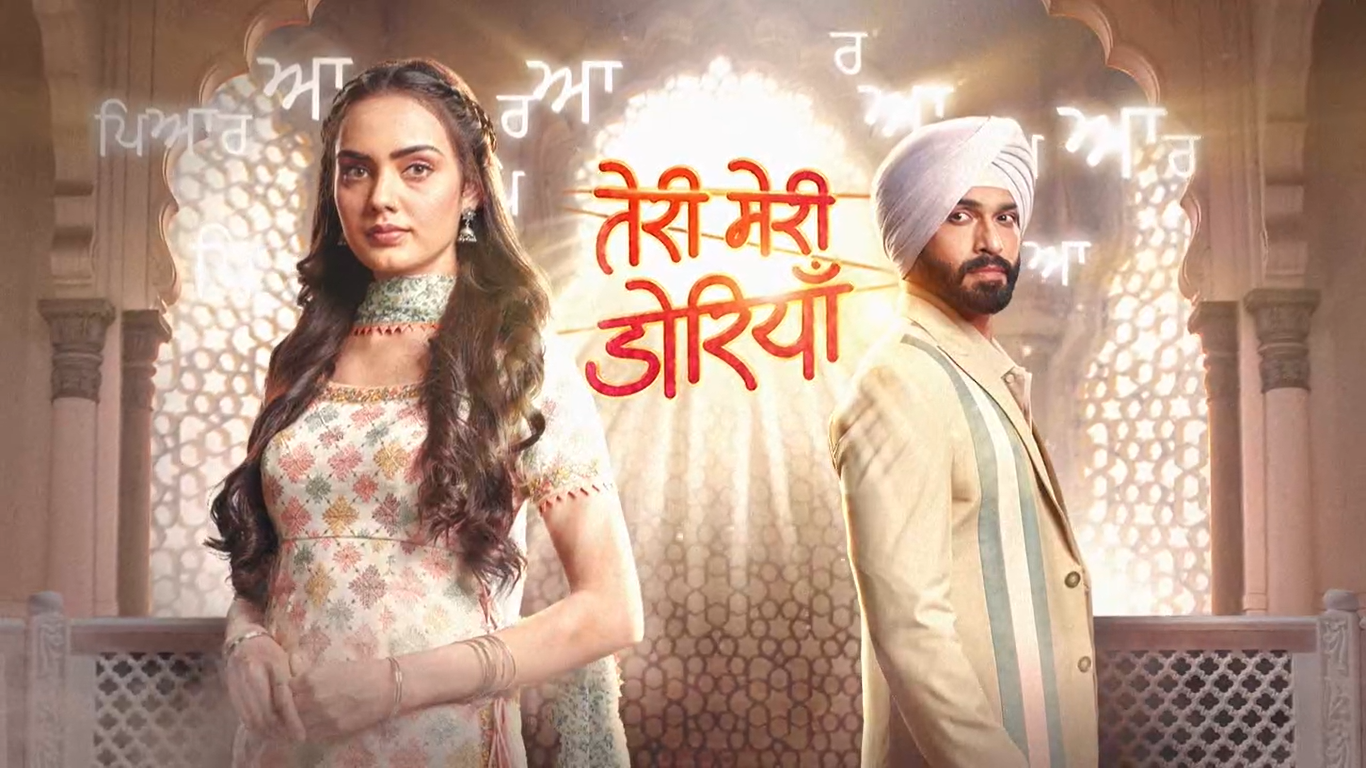
- Genre: Romance; Family drama Suspense; Thriller; Mystery
- Developed by: Jyoti Hazra
- Written by: Rajesh Chawla
- Screenplay by: Vishal Watwani; Renu Watwani
- Story by: Snigdha Basu
- Directed by: Jaideep Sen; Ashwini Saraswat; Arnav Chakravarti; Jafar Shaikh; Ranjeet Gupta; Rohit Fulari
- Creative director: Siddhartha Vankar
- Starring: Vijayendra Kumeria; Himanshi Parashar; Tushar Dhembla; Roopam Sharma; Jatin Arora; Prachi Hada; Yogendra Vikram Singh; Tripti Sharma
- Theme music composer: Dhruva Aradhya
- Composer: Nishant Pandey
- Country of origin: India
- Original language: Hindi
- No. of seasons: 1
- No. of episodes: 562

Production
- Producers: Pradeep Kumar; Rajesh Ram Singh; Pia Bajpiee; Shaika Parween
- Cinematography: Shailesh Manore
- Editors: Sagar Patil; Manish Upadhyay
- Camera setup: Multi-camera
- Running time: 22–25 minutes
- Production companies: Cockcrow & Shaika Entertainment

Original release
- Network: StarPlus
- Release: 4 January 2023 – 14 July 2024

Related
- Gaatchora

Teri Meri Doriyaann is an Indian Hindi-language television drama series that aired from 4 January 2023 to 14 July 2024 on StarPlus and streams digitally on Disney+ Hotstar. It was produced under Cockcrow & Shaika Entertainment, the series is an official adaptation of Star Jalsha's Bengali series Gaatchora. The series is dubbed in English and airs on Star Life as Strings of Love. It was replaced by Dil Ko Tumse Pyaar Hua in its timeslot.

== Plot ==
The fate of the three Brar cousins – Angad, Garry and Veer are linked with the three Monga sisters – Sahiba, Seerat and Keerat.

Sahiba is the hardworking and independent second daughter of the Monga family. She is an artist and earns money for her family by selling her art. Seerat, the eldest Monga sister, is pampered by her mother, Santosh, for her beauty. Santosh dreams of getting Seerat married to a rich man. As fate would have it, Angad falls in love with Seerat. However, Seerat is manipulated by Garry and his fake love. On Seerat and Angad's wedding day, Seerat runs away with Garry. Eventually, the Monga family's lies are exposed as well. Despite this, Angad and Sahiba get married under family pressure even though they despise each other.

Sahiba is slowly accepted by some of the family members due to her good nature, but Angad's parents still don't approve of her. Angad and Sahiba go through many challenges together and they slowly form a mutual understanding. However, Angad's trust in Sahiba is always shaken when new problems arise.

Sahiba is able to expose Garry as the man who had eloped with Seerat. The Brar family ousts Garry, but Angad eventually brings him back home and decides to get Seerat married to him in order to rectify her life. Sahiba resists as she knows that Garry can never change. As she had predicted, Garry is still the playboy womanizer that he was. He had only pretended to change in order to get back into the Brar house. Garry manipulates the family against Sahiba. With Veer's support, Sahiba exposes Garry's misdeeds, proving her innocence and revealing his infidelity to Seerat.

Garry breaks ties with the Brar family and leaves Seerat. Angad feels bad for ruining Seerat's life by getting her married to Garry, so he gives her support. However, Seerat starts developing romantic feelings towards Angad. Sahiba is once again put to the test, when the Brar family patriarch, Akaal refuses to let the women of his house go out to study or work. Despite this, Angad supports Sahiba and allows her to apply to college. From there on, Angad and Sahiba develop mutual romantic feelings towards one another. But their relationship is at stake, when they bring home a girl named Simran.

Sahiba is unaware that she is Inder's illegitimate daughter. When the truth is revealed to the family, everyone, except for Veer, blames Sahiba for bringing Simran home. Even Angad turns against her as Simran's presence hurts his mother. He completely disregards the fact that, Simran isn't responsible for her parents, Inder and Gayatri's affair.

Simran ends up in a life-threatening situation, prompting the family to unite. Angad finds out that Manbeer is responsible for Simran's condition. He confronts her and she blames Sahiba for turning her son against her, but it is actually a result of her own misdeeds. Meanwhile, Sahiba decides to donate her liver to save Simran, risking her own life. Initially pronounced dead, Angad's unwavering love brings Sahiba back, causing Seerat's jealousy. Seerat turns against her own sister and regrets leaving Angad. Keerat notices the change in Seerat and warns Sahiba, but Sahiba had already began suspecting Seerat's intentions. After Sahiba's release from the hospital, Inder welcomes her as his daughter-in-law, as he realises that his views towards Sahiba were completely wrong. Manbeer is still reluctant to accept Sahiba and blames Sahiba for her problems, especially as Angad embraces Simran as his sister with full Brar family rights.

Later on, Angad realises his love for Sahiba but Garry's apparent death interrupts his confession to Sahiba. Angad promises to support Seerat during this rough time, which Seerat uses as an advantage to get closer to Angad. When Angad finally confesses his love to Sahiba, Seerat stands there and Sahiba thinks that Angad is still in love with Seerat. Seerat further increases the misunderstandings between Sahiba and Angad. Sahiba decides to leave Angad and stay at a hostel. The Brars are confused as to what happened, but Manbeer takes her opportunity to rebuke Sahiba.

Sahiba is stalked by Rumi. Rumi changes his identity to Kartik and tries to get closer to Sahiba. Angad is worried about Sahiba's safety, but the real threat was looming over Angad, as Rumi wants to get him out of the picture. After Rumi reveals himself as Sahiba's stalker, Angad gets in a brutal fight with him. Sahiba is taken back into the Brar house. As Angad tries to clear the misunderstandings between Sahiba and him, Manbeer announces Angad and Seerat's wedding. Sahiba is heartbroken and leaves the house. Angad follows her to her hostel, only to find what appears to be Sahiba's lifeless body. The police arrive and arrest Angad for her murder, but he realises the body isn't Sahiba's. Rumi orchestrated the entire scenario, keeping Sahiba hostage. Angad escapes police custody and is determined to save Sahiba.

Angad eventually finds Sahiba and saves her from Rumi. However, Angad gets shot and is hospitalised. Everyone finds out that Sahiba is still alive. Sahiba charges Rumi with kidnapping and attempt to murder however, he is declared mentally unstable and he evades his charges.

Angad is still accused for the death of the girl in Sahiba's room. It is revealed that Rumi is Yashraj's son, who is Jasleen's ex-husband. The Brar family fear that Yash will not help Angad, but he surprises everyone by clearing Angad's name. Everyone is thankful towards Yash, but Jasleen becomes emotional having come across Yash again. She blames her parents, Akaal and Japjyot for her divorce, but Akaal blames her for not valuing her relationship and giving importance to money. It is revealed that Yash came from a middle-class family and did not have the means of supporting Jasleen's luxurious lifestyle. He asked for 10 lakh loan from Akaal to start up a music studio, but he got rejected on the basis that Akaal also started his business from nothing. Eventually, Jasleen left him, but even now she blames her father's ego for her separation. Jasleen's bitterness and cruelty towards the Brar family comes from the fact that she had never gotten a happy family of her own.

Meanwhile, Sahiba's return to the Brar household is marred by Manbeer's demand for her immediate departure, presenting her with divorce papers. Determined to speak to Angad first, Sahiba faces manipulation from Seerat and Manbeer, who undermine her worth and manipulate her into signing the papers. Akaal intervenes, recognizing his past mistakes in imposing his will on his children; therefore he wants Angad and Sahiba to make their own decisions.

But Angad finally realizes that, Seerat had tricked him. He finds out that he didn't confess to Sahiba but to Seerat that night. He then exposes Seerat in front of everyone. Due to her misdeeds, as well as for intentionally creating misunderstandings between Angad and Sahiba, and for trying to destroy their relationship, the entire family, especially Angad and Sahiba, loses complete trust and respect for Seerat.

After 7 days, Angad and Sahiba go to Mumbai for a diamond deal called Janoon-e-Dil. A mysterious person is in touch with Seerat and created a plot of Sunny Sood, who looks like Angad, in order to trouble him and steal Janoon-e-Dil from delivery.

Later, it is revealed that the mysterious person is none other than Garry, who threatens Seerat to bring a file from Angad's locker otherwise he will not spare her. After Seerat hands over the file, they divorce each other. Yashraj and Jasleen's engagement is fixed. Soon it is revealed that Yashraj, Garry, Parth and Mannat have all teamed up to destroy the Brar family. Angad and Sahiba learn that Garry is alive and he has teamed up with Yashraj, which breaks Jasleen and Yashraj's engagement. Eventually, the Brars suffer a huge loss as their secret information is leaked, which was in the file and Angad is arrested in a fake fraud case, which was planned by Garry, Yashraj, Parth and Mannat.

Soon the Brar family learn that Garry is alive and realize that Angad and Sahiba were right. Later, Yashraj and Garry out the Brar family from the Brar mansion and bring a bulldozer in order to destroy the Brar Mansion, but they fail as Jasleen goes inside the house in order to save Garry's childhood memories. Jasleen is admitted to the hospital and Garry soon learns that Yashraj will kick him out of his business once his revenge is complete. Garry realizes that Yashraj was only using him for revenge and doesn't truly care about him. In the hospital, Garry and Sahiba meet each other, and Garry reveals Yashraj's plan. Yashraj is again about to destroy Brar mansion, but is stopped by Angad and Sahiba. Yashraj is arrested and all allegations against were removed. Garry has now genuinely reformed, but the Brar family believe that it must be Garry's plan and refuse to forgive him.

Later on, Veer becomes a singer because of Keerat's support. Veer becomes popular and starts to ignore Keerat. Veer also mixes in with a bad group of people and starts taking drugs and drinking alcohol. He is pressurized into developing a new image of himself now that he is famous. Eventually, Veer and Keerat's marriage is fixed. However, on the day of Veer's bachelor's party, Veer tries to molest Keerat. Keerat is helped by Garry and Sahiba finds out about Veer's shamelessness. Sahiba breaks their marriage, but no one believes that Veer could do such a thing. Angad accidentally slaps Sahiba, so she ends her relationship with Angad. Sahiba and Angad have to spend time together before their divorce is finalized. Out of anger, Veer tries to turn Sahiba insane by giving her drugs. Seerat assists Veer, in order to make Angad hers. Garry has developed feelings for Keerat, but no one besides Sahiba knows. Jasleen and Garry are the only ones to support Sahiba as she has her manic episodes. Veer and Seerat try to burn Sahiba alive, but Angad sees them and realizes their truth. Angad exposes Veer and Seerat to the family and sends Veer to the rehab facility and ousts Seerat from the Brar house.

Sahiba and Angad finally fix all their misunderstandings and confess their love and consummate their marriage. However, Seerat kidnaps Angad with Yashraj's help but he is saved. Police arrests Seerat, but while trying to escape Seerat dies in a car blast. Sahiba is pregnant and is revealed to be expecting twins. Finally Sahiba and Angad reunite and Manbeer also finally accepts Sahiba. Sahiba and Inder try to save an orphan girl being exported to a racket, but Inder dies while saving Sahiba. Sahiba also has some complications and has a miscarriage.

The Brars and Angad blames Sahiba for Inder and their unborn babies’ death. Manbeer tags her as inauspicious. Sahiba feels hurt and leaves the Brar house.

Distraught and hurt by Angad's behavior and trauma for losing her babies, she boards a bus to Panesar. A cheerful guy named Diljeet Singh Panesar meets Sahiba and tries to help her. The bus gets into an accident and Sahiba meets a doctor who reveals that she is pregnant. Sahiba learns that one of her twins is still alive. Sahiba tries to inform Angad, but he doesn't listen to her.

=== 7 years later ===
Sahiba is shown living in Panesar with Diljeet and raising her and Angad's son, Akeer. Akeer assumes Diljeet to be his father and both have a very loving and strong bond. Angad has become emotionless and unhappy, and he only cares for his sister Simran. Manbeer is shown to have accepted Simran as her daughter. Meanwhile, Garry and Keerat are married and have a daughter named Bani.

Angad meets Akeer, Diljeet and Sahiba and is shocked to see her moved on. Akeer forms a nice bond with Angad and Garry finds out that Akeer is Angad's son and kidnaps him to reunite Sahiba and Angad.

Angad learns that Akeer is his son and tries to find him. On the other hand, Manbeer has fixed Angad's marriage with Amanpreet. Her mother Harneet is revealed to be Diljeet's biological mother. Out of fear of losing Akeer and Sahiba, Diljeet becomes hellbent on keeping Akeer away from Angad. Harneet, to rectify her mistake of abandoning her son, helps Diljeet financially. Diljeet runs off with Akeer and brainwashes him against Angad. Diljeet becomes more obsessed with Sahiba, so he proposes that he will free Akeer if she marries him.

Harneet tells Amanpreet that after Diljeet marries Sahiba, Angad will marry her. Sahiba agrees for the marriage, but plans with Angad to outsmart Diljeet and runaway with Akeer. However, Diljeet foils their plan. With no choice left, Sahiba reveals to Akeer that Diljeet is not his real father. Akeer gets upset and runs away. Diljeet points his gun at Sahiba, but he gets shot instead. Sahiba gets arrested and Angad vows to prove her innocence.

Angad and Sahiba are kidnapped by Amarinder, Amanpreet's father. It is revealed that Amanpreet is mentally unstable and was the one who murdered Diljeet. She reveals that she killed Diljeet out of jealousy because her mother hid the truth of Diljeet being her half-brother. Amanpreet then fixes time bomb to kill Angad and Sahiba, since Angad can't be hers. Sahiba confesses that even though she hated Angad for leaving her, she was unable to stop herself loving him. Angad promises to unite with Sahiba forever and frees himself and her. However, Amarinder shoots Angad, but Sahiba saves him and takes the bullet.

Sahiba dies and Angad and the Brars become devastated. Akeer is upset and refuses to accept Angad as his father.

=== 1 month later ===
Sahiba's look-alike, Gurnoor Kaur appears. Angad is shocked to see Gurnoor and tries to ignore her, but Akeer's insistence on meeting her brings them face-to-face all the time. Gurnoor initially is unaware about her resemblance to Sahiba, but finds out later while working as Akeer's teacher. As they spend more time together, Angad struggles to reconcile his feelings for Sahiba with his growing attraction to Gurnoor. Meanwhile, Akeer becomes increasingly attached to Gurnoor, seeing her as a replacement for his mother. Eventually, Gurnoor is brought into the Brar house as Akeer's private teacher. Manbeer is wary of her while Keerat grows a close sisterly bond with her.

However, Gurnoor has a mysterious past that she is running away from. As she takes shelter in the Brar house, she has grown attached to Akeer and Angad. She falls in love with Angad, and even Angad is growing fond of her.

== Cast ==
=== Main ===
- Vijayendra Kumeria as Angad Singh Brar: Inder and Manbeer's son; Simran's half-brother; Seerat and Amanpreet's ex-fiancé; Sahiba's widower; Gurnoor's second husband; Akeer's father (2023–2024)
- Himanshi Parashar as
  - Sahiba Kaur Monga Brar: Ajeet and Santosh's second daughter; Seerat and Keerat's sister; Angad's late wife; Akeer's mother (2023–2024)
  - Gurnoor Kaur Brar (formerly Mann): Sahiba's lookalike; Zorawar's ex-wife; Angad's second wife; Akeer's step-mother (2024)
- Tushar Dhembla as Garry Baweja: Jasleen and Yashraj's son; Kiara's brother; Rumi's half-brother; Seerat's ex-husband; Keerat's husband; Bani's father (2023–2024)
- Prachi Hada/Tripti Sharma as Keerat Kaur Monga Baweja: Ajeet and Santosh's youngest daughter; Seerat and Sahiba's sister; Veer's ex-fiancée; Garry's wife; Bani's mother (2023–2024)/(2024)
- Roopam Sharma as Seerat Kaur Monga: Ajeet and Santosh's eldest daughter; Sahiba and Keerat's elder sister; Garry's ex-wife; Angad's ex-fiancée and one-sided obsessive love interest (2023–2024)
- Jatin Arora as Veer Singh Brar: Jaspal and Gurleen's son; Ekam's brother; Keerat's ex-fiancé (2023–2024)

=== Recurring ===
- Lubna Salim as Santosh Kaur Monga: Sudha's sister; Ajeet's wife; Seerat, Sahiba and Keerat's mother; Bani and Akeer's grandmother (2023–2024)
- Sagar Saini as Ajeet Singh Monga: Santosh's husband; Seerat, Sahiba and Keerat's father; Bani and Akeer's grandfather (2023–2024)
- Surendrapal Singh as Akaal Singh Brar: Patriarch of the Brar family; Japjyot's husband; Jasleen, Inder, Prabhjyot and Jaspal's father; Angad, Garry, Kiara, Veer, Ekam, Simran and Prince's grandfather; Akeer and Bani's great-grandfather (2023–2024)
- Amardeep Jha as Japjyot Kaur Brar: Matriarch of the Brar family; Akaal's widow; Jasleen, Inder, Prabhjyot, and Jaspal's mother; Angad, Simran, Garry, Kiara, Veer and Ekam and Prince's grandmother; Akeer and Bani's great-grandmother (2023-2024)
- Avinash Wadhawan as Inderpal "Inder" Singh Brar: Akaal and Japjyot's elder son; Jaspal, Prabhjyot and Jasleen's brother; Manbeer's husband; Gayatri's ex-lover; Angad and Simran's father; Akeer's grandfather (2023–2024)
- Anita Kulkarni as Manbeer Kaur Brar: Inder's widow; Angad's mother; Simran's step-mother; Akeer's grandmother (2023–2024)
- Prachi Thakur as Simran Kaur Brar: Inder and Gayatri's daughter; Manbeer's step-daughter; Angad's half-sister (2024)
  - Puvika Gupta as Child Simran Kaur Brar (formerly Sachdeva) (2023–2024)
- Sharhaan Singh as Jaspal Singh Brar: Akaal and Japjyot's younger son; Inder, Prabhjyot and Jasleen's brother; Gurleen's husband; Veer and Ekam's father (2023–2024)
- Anshu Varshney as Gurleen Kaur Brar: Jaspal's wife; Veer and Ekam's mother (2023–2024)
- Vaishnavi Ganatra as Ekam Kaur Brar: Gurleen and Jaspal's daughter; Veer's sister (2023)
- Gauri Tonk as Jasleen "Jassi" Kaur Brar (formerly Baweja): Akaal and Japjyot's elder daughter; Jaspal, Prabhjyot and Inder's sister; Yash ex-wife; Garry and Kiara's mother; Bani's grandmother (2023–2024)
- Rose Sardana/Vaibhavi Mahajan as Kiara Baweja: Jasleen and Yash's daughter; Garry's sister; Rumi's half-sister (2023)
- Neetu Wadhwa as Prabhjyot Kaur Brar Sandhu: Akaal and Japjyot's younger daughter; Jasleen, Inder and Jaspal's sister; Hansraj's wife; Prince's mother (2023–2024)
- Sailessh Gulabani as Hansraj Singh Sandhu: Prabhjyot's husband; Rewa's brother; Prince's father (2023–2024)
- Naman Ratan as Akeer Singh Brar: Sahiba and Angad's son; Gurnoor's step-son; Diljeet's foster son; Bani's cousin (2024)
- Yami Khandelwal as Bani Baweja: Keerat and Garry's daughter (2024)
- Yogendra Vikram Singh as Diljeet Singh Panesar: Harneet's illegitimate son; Amanpreet's half-brother; Amarinder's stepson; Beeji's adoptive son; Twinkle's adoptive brother; Akeer's foster father (2024)
- Manoj Chandila as Zorawar Maan: Gurnoor's ex-husband (2024)
- Hrishikesh Pandey as Yashraj "Yash" Baweja: Jasleen's ex–husband; Natasha's widower; Rumi, Garry and Kiara's father; Bani's grandfather (2023–2024)
- Ruhani Roy as Rewa Kaur Sandhu: Hansraj's sister (2023)
- Harsh Rajput as Rumi Baweja (Mirza / Kartik): Natasha and Yash's son; Garry and Kiara's half-brother; Sahiba's stalker (2023)
- Neha Khan as Amanpreet "Amu" Gill: Harneet and Amarinder's daughter; Diljeet's half-sister; Angad's ex-fiancée (2024)
- Kamla Dadialla as Harneet Gill: Amarinder's wife; Diljeet and Amanpreet's mother (2024)
- Digvijay Purohit as Dr. Amarinder Gill: Harneet's husband; Amanpreet's father; Diljeet's stepfather (2024)
- Disha Pandey as Twinkle Panesar: Beeji's daughter; Diljeet's adoptive sister (2024)
- Sonika Gill as Mrs. Panesar "Beeji": Twinkle's mother; Diljeet's adoptive mother (2024)
- Shivya Pathania as Shanaya: Garry's ex–fiancée (2023)
- Rishina Kandhari as Senior Inspector Megha Kashyap (2023–2024)
- Priyamvada Sahay as Hostel Warden (2023)
- Unknown as Gayatri Sachdeva: Inder's ex-lover; Simran's mother (2023)
- Unknown as Natasha Baweja: Yash's second wife; Rumi's mother; Garry and Kiara's step-mother; Bani's step-grandmother (2023)

=== Guests ===
- Amandeep Sidhu as Chandni from Chashni (2023)
- Srishti Singh as Roshni from Chashni (2023)
- Shiny Doshi as Dhara Pandya from Pandya Store (2023)
- Megha Chakraborty as Imlie Rana from Imlie (2023)
- Ayesha Singh as Sai Joshi from Ghum Hai Kisikey Pyaar Meiin (2023)
- Neil Bhatt as Virat Chavan from Ghum Hai Kisikey Pyaar Meiin (2023)
- Sayli Salunkhe as Vandana Karmarkar from Baatein Kuch Ankahee Si (2023)
- Hiba Nawab as Jhanak Raina from Jhanak (2023)

== Production ==
=== Casting ===
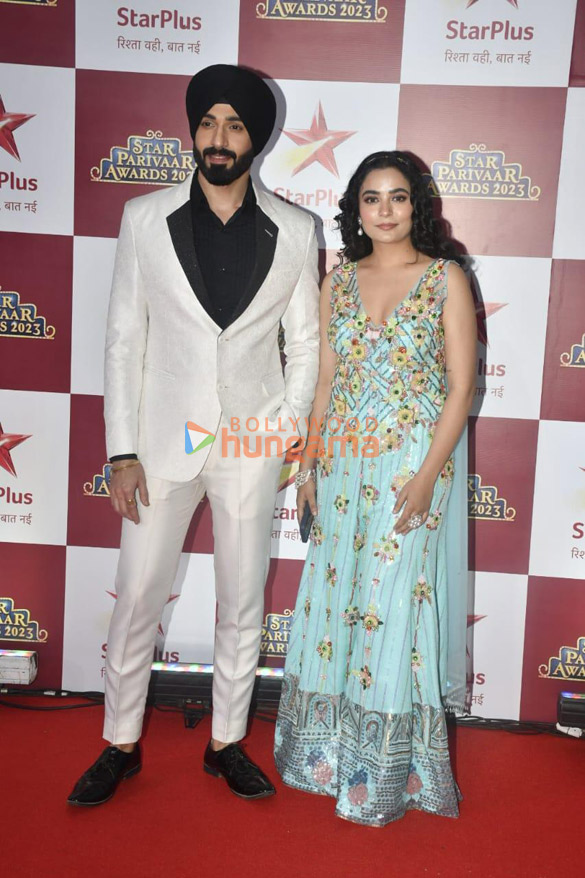
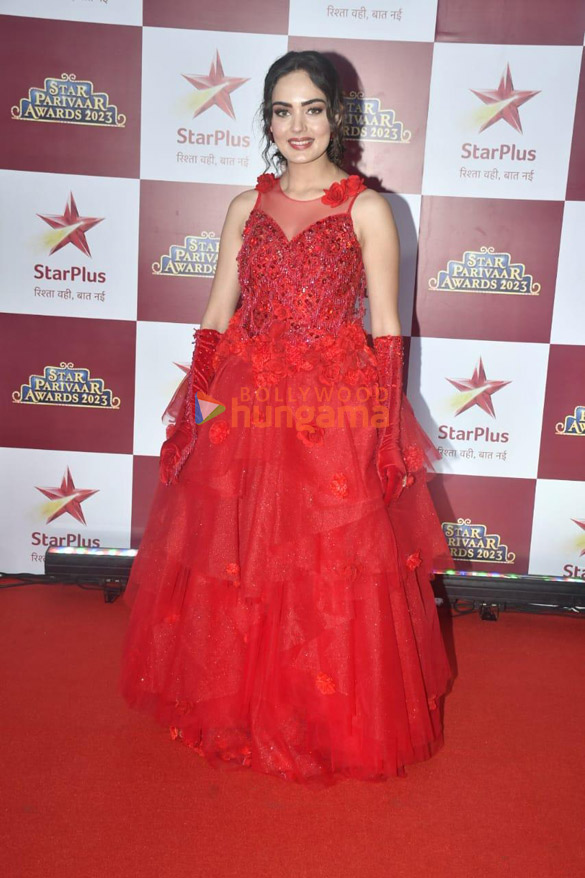
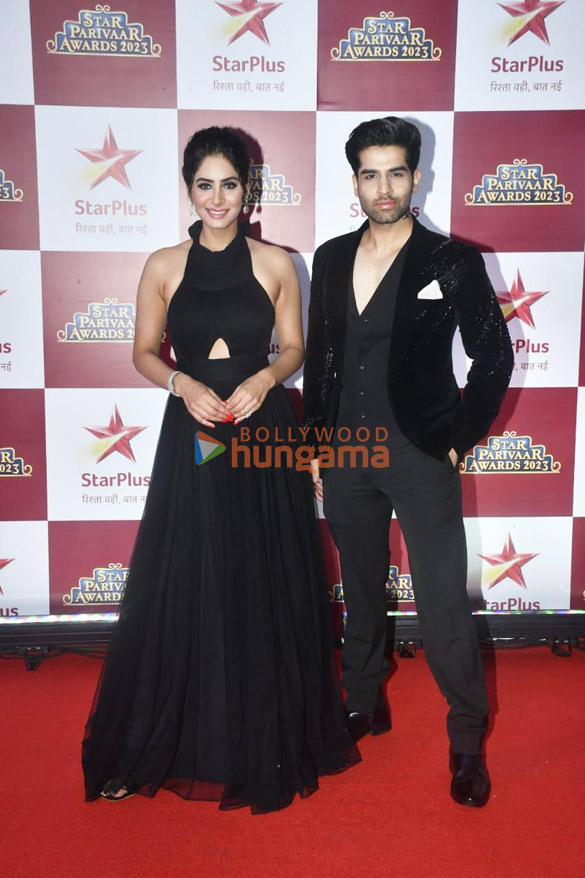
The lead cast of Teri Meri Doriyaann.

Vijayendra Kumeria and Himanshi Parashar were cast as the leads, Angad and Sahiba. Roopam Sharma, Tushar Dhembla, Jatin Arora and Prachi Hada were cast as the other leads - Seerat, Garry, Veer and Keerat respectively.

Prachi Hada quit the show in February 2024. She stated, "In the scenes, I was either standing with the family or having a one-line dialogue. Considering my potential, I can't stand in one corner as a crowd and add no value to the show or my craft as an actress. The decision was long due. I have been contemplating it for two months." In the same month, Jatin Arora too quit the show citing health issues, but later returned to the show in July 2024.

In March 2024, Yogendra Vikram Singh was cast as Diljeet Singh Panesar opposite Parashar. In the same month, Tripti Sharma was cast as Keerat, replacing Hada. In June 2024, Parashar's character Sahiba died and a new character Gurnoor was introduced.

=== Filming ===
The wedding track of Angad-Sahiba featured various StarPlus characters gracing different wedding ceremonies. Megha Chakraborty from Imlie graced the Mehndi ceremony followed by Amandeep Sidhu, Srishti Singh from Chashni and Ayesha Singh and Neil Bhatt from Ghum Hai Kisikey Pyaar Mein gracing the sangeet ceremony. Shiny Doshi from Pandya Store graced the Haldi ceremony celebrations.

On 10 March 2023 around 4:30pm, a massive fire broke out on the neighboring set of Ghum Hai Kisikey Pyaar Meiin, leaving the set into ashes and it was reported that the fire even reached the Teri Meri Doriyaann set and another neighboring set of Ajooni too.

=== Release ===
The first promo was released starring Ghum Hai Kisikey Pyaar Meiin leads Neil Bhatt, Ayesha Singh and Aishwarya Sharma introducing the cast of the show.

A second promo featuring Ghum Hai Kisikey Pyaar Meiin's Ayesha Singh and Pandya Store's Kanwar Dhillon promoting the show was released, where Kanwar cheered for Sahiba-Angad, while Ayesha for Veer-Sahiba.

It was followed by another promo of Neil Bhatt of Ghum Hai Kisikey Pyaar Meiin and Simran Budharup of Pandya Store, promoting the new show. Neil cheered for Angad-Seerat and Simran cheered for Seerat-Garry.

Another promo featuring Pranali Rathod from Yeh Rishta Kya Kehlata Hai cheering for Angad-Sahiba and Sudhanshu Pandey from Anupamaa cheering for Angad-Seerat was released days before the premiere.

=== Broadcast ===
Teri Meri Doriyaann telecasted special episodes from 22 January 2024 to 26 January 2024 wherein two episodes were released per day.

== Adaptations ==
Teri Meri Doriyaann is an official adaptation of the Star Jalsha's Bengali series Gaatchora, that premiered on 20 December 2021.

== Awards and nominations ==
Year	Award	Category	Recipient	Result	Ref.
2023	23rd Indian Television Academy Awards	Best Actress in a Supporting Role	Lubna Salim	Won	
2023	23rd Indian Television Academy Awards	Best Actress in a Negative Role	Gauri Tonk	Won	
