= List of programs broadcast by Asianet =

Asianet is a general entertainment private broadcast television channel owned by JioStar, a joint venture between Viacom18 and Disney India. This is a list of current and former programs broadcast by the Malayalam GEC Asianet.

== Current broadcast ==
=== Drama series ===
Premiere date	Series	Adaptation of
15 May 2023	Patharamattu	Bengali TV series Gaatchora
29 January 2024	Chempaneer Poovu	Tamil TV series Siragadikka Aasai
17 June 2024	Santhwanam 2	Tamil TV series Pandian Stores 2
7 July 2025	Mazha Thorum Munpe	
10 November 2025	Kattathe Kilikkoodu	Tamil TV series Ayyanar Thunai
10 November 2025	Advocate Anjali	Bengali TV series Geeta LL.B
2 February 2026	Ee Puzhayum Kadannu	Tamil TV series Mahanadhi
1 June 2026	Ivar Vivahitharayal	Kannada TV series Ninna Jothe Nanna Kathe

=== Reality shows ===
Premiere date	Show	Adaptation of
6 September 2026	Bigg Boss 8	Indian TV show Bigg Boss

== Former broadcast ==
=== Soap operas ===
Premiere date	Series	Last aired	Notes	Episodes
12 December 1997	Grihapravesham	13 February 1998		10
14 October 1998	Nirakkootukal	9 June 1999		20+
21 December 1998	Sthree (Part 1)	16 June 2000	First Malayalam mega serial	390
20 June 1999	Devatha	22 October 2000		71
20 September 1999	Samayam	25 October 2000		170+
7 January 2000	Nizhalukal	6 April 2002	First Malayalam horror serial	110+
19 June 2000	Durga	29 March 2002		460+
19 June 2000	Snehanjali	18 May 2001		240+
19 June 2000	Sthree (Part 2)	9 November 2001		350
19 August 2000	Shamanathaalam	11 August 2001		52
29 October 2000	Hukka Huva Mikkado	13 May 2001		29
12 February 2001	Swararaagam	11 January 2002		239
19 February 2001	Sreeraman Sreedevi	1 February 2002		249
26 February 2001	Gandharvayaamam	16 November 2001		190
12 March 2001	Olangal	16 September 2001		63
16 April 2001	Akshayapathram	12 October 2001		110+
14 May 2001	Kilikkoodu	16 November 2001		129
12 November 2001	Sthree (Part 3)	14 March 2003		300+
19 November 2001	Nakshathrangal	25 January 2002		49
26 November 2001	Innale	21 June 2002		144
26 November 2001	Vasundhara Medicals	17 January 2003		250+
14 January 2002	Sharada	1 November 2002		150+
28 January 2002	Jalamohini	15 March 2002		35
4 February 2002	Sparsham	30 December 2002		100+
1 April 2002	Kudumbavilakku	27 September 2002	Anthology series	70+
13 May 2002	Akkarapacha	1 November 2002		90+
10 June 2002	Paavakkootthu	8 November 2002		103
24 June 2002	Vivahitha	20 September 2002		70+
16 September 2002	Sneha	6 December 2002		70+
4 November 2002	Shanghupushpam	4 July 2003		100+
11 November 2002	Snehadooram	28 March 2003		90+
9 December 2002	Idavazhiyile Poocha Mindapoocha	28 March 2003		90+
6 January 2003	Swantham	12 March 2004		100+
20 January 2003	Swapnam	16 January 2004		250+
17 March 2003	Sthree (Part 4)	1 August 2003		80+
7 July 2003	Mangalyam	28 May 2004		200+
4 August 2003	Sthree Oru Santhwanam	10 September 2004	Asianet (2003–04) Asianet Plus (2007–08) (Sequel)	200+
14 September 2003	American Dreams	15 February 2004		23
1 December 2003	Chechiyamma	19 March 2004		79
19 January 2004	Megham	3 December 2004		90+
15 March 2004	Kadamattath Kathanar	11 February 2005	Fantasy thriller	255
22 March 2004	Muhoortham	5 November 2004		164
10 May 2004	Avicharitham	9 July 2004		45
31 May 2004	Dambathya Geethangal	21 January 2005		170
12 July 2004	Black and White: The Game (Sequel to Black and White)	22 October 2004	Thriller series	75
13 September 2004	Suryaputhri	24 March 2006		397
16 October 2004	Life is Beautiful	16 April 2006		110+
1 November 2004	1,2,3...Saat 1,2,3...	7 January 2005	First Indian science fiction drama for children	100+
8 November 2004	Orma	18 November 2005	Family drama	100+
8 November 2004	Thalolam	11 March 2005		90
29 November 2004	Koodum Thedi	9 April 2005		95
6 December 2004	Oru Penninte Kadha	18 March 2005		75
10 January 2005	Santhanagopalam	6 May 2005		84
24 January 2005	Omanathinkal Pakshi	24 March 2006	Family drama	100+
14 February 2005	Allauddinum Albuthavilakkum	22 April 2005		49
14 February 2005	Dracula	18 March 2005		25
21 April 2005	Ellam Mayajaalam	1 July 2005		74
28 March 2005	Nokkeththa Doorath	24 June 2005		64
4 April 2005	Kudumbini	29 July 2005		84
25 April 2005	Sindoorarekha	30 December 2005		178
9 May 2005	Ladies Hostel	10 May 2005		25
27 June 2005	Sahadarmmini	10 February 2006		164
1 August 2005	Sundari Sundari	18 November 2005		79
18 July 2005	Abhiraami	12 August 2005		20
15 August 2005	Thanichaay	14 October 2005		44
12 September 2005	Vikramadhithyan	7 April 2006		150
17 October 2005	Manthrakodi	4 August 2006		215
21 November 2005	Sthree (Sequel to Part 1)	12 January 2007		298
2 January 2006	Ammamanassu	27 April 2007		343
16 January 2006	Lakshyam	3 March 2006	Investigation Thriller	35
13 February 2006	Pazhassiraja	21 April 2006		50
6 March 2006	Swarnamayooram	8 September 2006		134
27 March 2006	Makal	12 May 2006		33
27 March 2006	Ponnoonjal	12 May 2006		35
10 April 2006	Kadalinakkare	14 July 2006	Fantasy series	70
24 April 2006	Sanmansullavarkku Samaadhaanam	20 April 2008	Comedy	300+
15 May 2006	Ivide Ellavarkkum Sugham	7 July 2006		50
15 May 2006	Maalayogam	18 May 2007		263
10 July 2006	Minnaram	6 October 2006		64
17 July 2006	Ammathamburatti	22 September 2006	Actresses Sreevidya's final serial before her demise	49
11 September 2006	Swantham Suryaputhri	18 May 2007	Sequel To Part 1	179
25 September 2006	Thadankalpalayam	17 November 2006		40
9 October 2006	Samadooram	7 December 2007		301
14 November 2006	Mandrake	19 January 2007		49
20 November 2006	Swami Ayyappan	14 March 2008	Life story of Ayyappan	500+
15 January 2007	Nombarappoovu	28 December 2007		247
22 January 2007	Pavitra Jaililaanu	13 July 2007		125
30 April 2007	Unniyarcha	17 August 2007		80
16 July 2007	Ente Manasaputhri	21 May 2010		772
20 August 2007	January	19 October 2007		44
3 September 2007	Rahasyam	25 September 2009		535
10 September 2007	Snehathooval	8 April 2010		521
22 October 2007	Shreekrishnaleela	26 September 2008		241
10 December 2007	Nirmalyam	10 October 2008		216
17 March 2008	Meera	16 May 2008		44
21 April 2008	Hello Kuttichaathan	3 October 2008		118
19 May 2008	Vishudha Thomasleeha	18 July 2008		45
20 July 2008	Vishudha Alphonsamma	13 December 2009		74
21 July 2008	Kanaaakkuyil	10 September 2008		38
25 August 2008	Aalilathaali	19 June 2009		211
15 September 2008	Sree Mahaabhagavatham	26 November 2010		568
29 September 2008	Devi Maahaathmyam	29 June 2012		972
6 October 2008	Parijatham	1 April 2011		638
4 October 2008	Enkilum Ente Gopalakrishna	27 May 2009		178
12 December 2008	Ammathottil	3 April 2009		82
16 February 2009	Akkare Ikkare	20 November 2009		202
6 April 2009	Hello Kuttichaathan (Season 2)	2 October 2009		82
22 June 2009	Bhamini Tholkkaarilla	9 October 2009		76
28 September 2009	Vigraham	15 January 2010		78
5 October 2009	Autograph	5 April 2012		646
12 October 2009	Kanakireedam	27 November 2009		35
18 January 2010	Kunjaalimarakkar	23 July 2010		134
1 February 2010	Twenty-Twenty One	23 April 2010		59
12 April 2010	Devaraagam	5 April 2012		417
26 April 2010	Veruthe Oru Bharthaavu	13 August 2010		80
24 May 2010	Harichandanam	4 May 2012		504
26 July 2010	Lipstick	1 October 2010		49
4 October 2010	Alavudheente Adbuthavilakku	25 November 2011		302
25 October 2010	Randamathoraal	14 January 2011		60
15 November 2010	Swami Ayyappan Sharanam	27 May 2011	Sequel to Swami Ayyappan serial	139
31 January 2011	Kumkumapoovu	1 February 2014		785
4 April 2011	Ammakkili	1 March 2013		489
30 May 2011	Kunjikkoonan	4 November 2011		113
2 January 2012	Amma	4 July 2015	Bengali TV series Maa....Tomay Chara Ghum Ashena	1008
6 February 2012	Agniputhri	23 November 2012		208
7 May 2012	Vrindhavanam	2 March 2013		
2 July 2012	Sthreedhanam	14 May 2016		1143
26 November 2012	Sabarimala Sreedharmasastha	15 February 2013		59
18 February 2013	Aardram	4 October 2013		164
4 March 2013	Paadhasaram	28 March 2014		278
22 July 2013	Parasparam	31 August 2018	Hindi TV series Diya Aur Baati Hum	1524
3 February 2014	Chandanamazha	9 December 2017	Hindi TV series Saath Nibhaana Saathiya	1173
31 March 2014	Balaganapathy	5 June 2015		307
20 October 2014	Karuthamuthu	9 August 2019		1450
8 November 2014	Vellanakalude Naadu	13 January 2017		56
5 January 2015	Akkamma Stalinum Pathrose Gandhiyum	3 July 2015		129
8 June 2015	4 the People	4 March 2016		192
6 July 2015	7 Raathrikal	30 October 2015		83
6 July 2015	Pranayam	28 April 2017	Hindi TV series Yeh Hai Mohabbatein	524
10 August 2015	Kalyana Sougandhikam	8 April 2016		177
11 April 2016	Kana Kanmani	26 August 2016		101
16 May 2016	Bharya	27 April 2019		860
29 August 2016	Chinthavishtayaya Seetha	28 January 2017		127
5 September 2016	Nonachiparu	18 November 2016		50
30 January 2017	Vanambadi	18 September 2020	Bengali TV series Potol Kumar Gaanwala	1019
1 May 2017	Neermathalam	7 July 2017		58
10 July 2017	Chempattu	20 October 2017		50
11 December 2017	Kasthooriman	27 March 2021		903
26 February 2018	Neelakkuyil	3 April 2020	Bengali TV series Ishti Kutum	662
10 September 2018	Seetha Kalyanam	10 September 2021	Telugu TV series Lakshmi Kalyanam	775
14 January 2019	Sabarimala Swami Ayyappan	14 February 2020		302
29 April 2019	Pournamithinkal	17 April 2021		515
26 August 2019	Unnimaya	1 November 2019		50
11 November 2019	Kerala Samaajam:Oru Pravaasi Kadha	20 January 2020		50
16 December 2019	Mounaragam	29 May 2026	Telugu TV series Mounaraagam	1700
27 January 2020	Kudumbavilakku	3 August 2024	Bengali TV series Sreemoyee	1204
22 June 2020	Ammayariyathe	6 May 2023		823
7 September 2020	Padatha Painkili	24 March 2023	Bengali TV series Ke Apon Ke Por	678
21 September 2020	Santhwanam	27 January 2024	Tamil TV series Pandian Stores	1003
28 November 2020	Life Is Beautiful (Season 2)	30 January 2021		13
4 January 2021	Koodevide	22 July 2023	Bengali TV series Mohor	686
19 April 2021	Bala Hanuman	30 October 2021		152
8 June 2021	Sasneham	25 March 2023		559
12 July 2021	Thoovalsparsham	11 February 2023		430
1 November 2021	Daya: Chentheeyil Chalicha Kumkumapottu	26 November 2022		333
15 November 2021	Palunku	30 December 2022	Bengali TV series Khorkuto	288
5 December 2022	Nammal	10 November 2023		256
13 February 2023	Geeta Govindam	4 July 2025		709
3 July 2023	Kaathodu Kaathoram	13 September 2024	Tamil TV series Eeramana Rojave	351
3 July 2023	Gouri Shankaram	27 December 2024	Hindi TV series Mann Kee Awaaz Pratigya	407
24 July 2023	Muttathe Mulla	19 November 2023		100
6 November 2023	Malikappuram: Apathbandhavan Ayyappan	22 February 2025		383
20 November 2023	Chandrikayilaliyunna Chandrakantham	23 May 2025	Bengali TV series Kusum Dola	449
29 January 2024	Etho Janma Kalpanayil	29 August 2025	Hindi TV series Iss Pyaar Ko Kya Naam Doon?	412
17 June 2024	Janakiyudeyum Abhiyudeyum Veedu	31 October 2025	Hindi TV series Kahaani Ghar Ghar Kii	358
5 August 2024	Snehakkoottu	15 May 2026		517
26 August 2024	Ishtam Mathram	15 May 2026	Hindi TV series Yeh Hai Mohabbatein	493
16 December 2024	Pavithram	30 April 2026	Bengali TV series Khelaghor	368
7 April 2025	Teacheramma	24 April 2026		324
29 September 2025	Happy Couples	13 February 2026		100

=== Reality shows ===
First aired	Series name	End date	Adapted from	Ref.
1993	Cinemala	2013		
1993	Kannadi	2013		
1994	Nammal Thammil	2020		
1995	Anantham Ajnatham	2020		
1995	Talent Scan	1998		
1998	Suprabhatham	2012	First Malayalam Talk-Show Program In The Early Morning	
2000	Sa.Ri.Ga.Ma	2013		
2001	Sancharam	2013		
2006	Star Singer (seasons 1–10)	2026		
2008	Star Singer Junior (seasons 1–3)	2023		
2009	Comedy Stars (seasons 1–3)	2022		
2011	Mylanchi (seasons 1–7)	2023		
2012	Ningalkkum Aakaam Kodeeshwaran (seasons 1–4)	2017	British TV show Who Wants to Be a Millionaire? and Hindi TV show Kaun Banega Crorepati	
2012	Sundari Neeyum Sundaran Njanum	2013		
2012	Satyameva Jayate	2014		
2013	Taste Time	2026		
2013	Bharthakkanmarude Sradhakku	2013		
2013	Munch Stars	2013		
2013	Badai Bungalow (seasons 1–2)	2020	Hindi TV show Comedy Nights with Kapil	
2015	Auto Graph – The Motor Show	2020		
2015	Sell Me the Answer (seasons 1–3)	2019	British TV show Sell Me the Answer	
2015	Fastest Family First – Adi Mone Buzzer (seasons 1–2)	2022		
2017	The People's Choice	2017		
2018	Bigg Boss (season 1-7)	2025	Netherland TV show Big Brother	
2019	Start Music Aaradhyam Paadum (seasons 1–5)	2023	Tamil TV show Start Music	
2020	5 STAR Kitchen ITC Chef's Special (seasons 1–2)	2022		
2021	Valkannadi: The Matinee Show	2021		
2022	Dancing Stars	2023		
2023	Cook with Comedy	2023	Tamil TV show Cooku with Comali	
2024	Enkile Ennodu Para	2025	Tamil TV show Oo Solriya Oo Oohm Solriya	
2026	Comedy Cooks	2026	Tamil TV show Cooku with Comali	
2026	Bigg Boss Agnipareeksha	2026	Telugu TV show Bigg Boss Agnipariksha	
