= Uma Nair =

Indian television actress

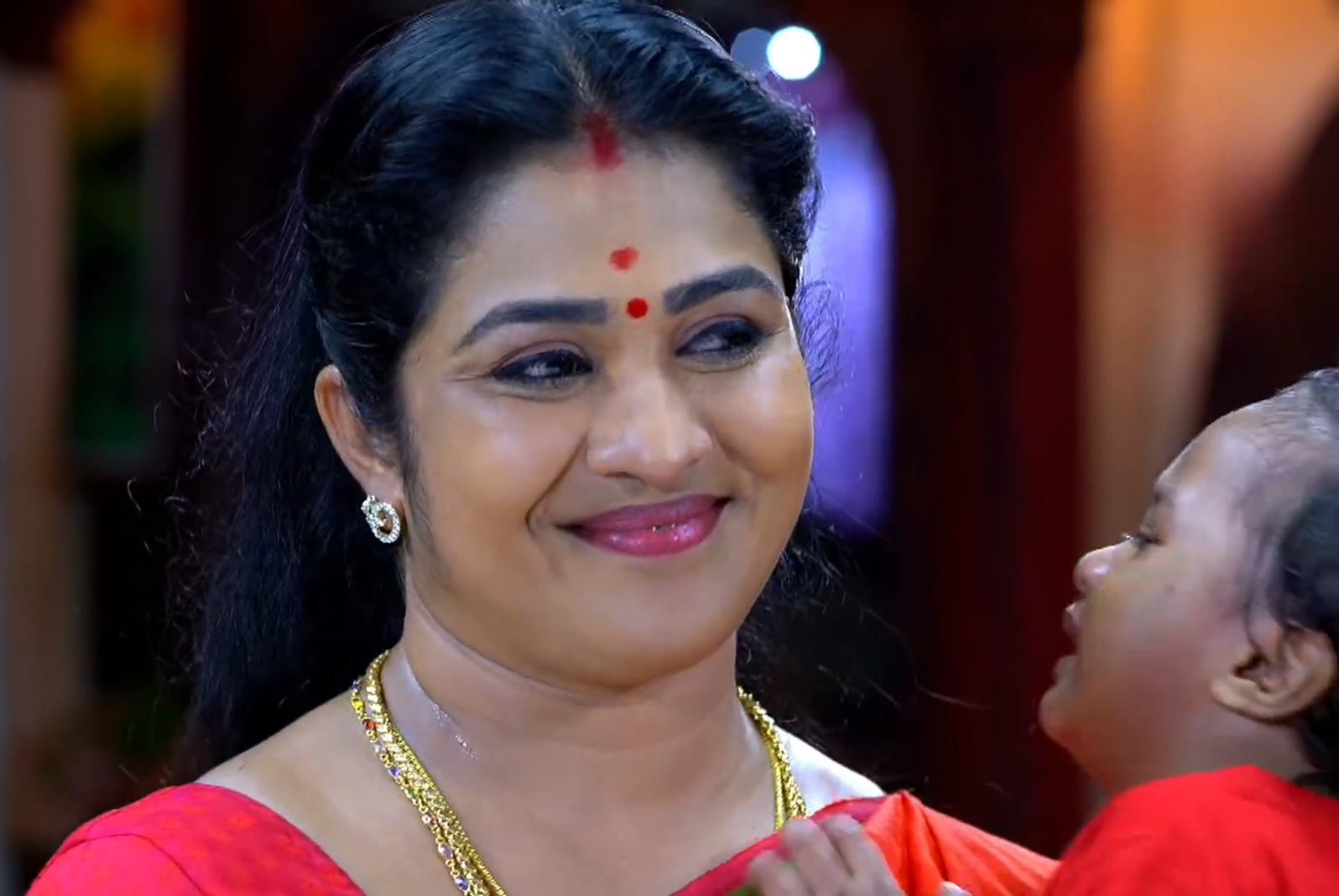
- Nair in 2026
- Born: 17 April 1983 (age 43); Kollam, Kerala, India
- Other name: Umadevi Nair
- Occupations: Actress; Producer; ATMA Executive member Censor Board member Entrepreneur; CEEM executive member
- Spouse: Shaji G
- Children: 2

Uma Nair (born 17 April 1983) is an Indian film and television actress and producer who works predominantly in Malayalam-language soap operas. She has appeared over 78 serials and 36 movies. She is best known for playing the supporting role of Nirmala in Vanambadi.

== Filmography ==
=== Films ===
- All films are in Malayalam unless noted otherwise.

Year	Film	Role	Notes	Ref.
	Thengunna Manassukal		Acting debut; short film	
	Ninaithale Sugam Thanedi		Tamil film; lead role	
2003	Hariharan Pillai Happy Aanu	Kavya's friend		
2005	December	Sony Issac	Credited as Mithila Nair	
2015	Thilothama	Mrs. Jomon		
2016	James & Alice	Soosan		
2017	Chembarathipoo	Vinod's mother		
2017	Aakashamittayee	Mathematics Teacher		
2017	Lakshyam	Shalini's aunt		
2017	Aaliya	Aaliya's mother	Short film	
2018	Kinar	Suma		
2018	Marubhoomiyile Mazhathullikal	Gouri		
2018	Premanjali	Mathri		
2019	Kodathi Samaksham Balan Vakeel	Public prosecutor		
2019	Edakkad Battalion 06	Zeenath		
2019	Oronnonnara PranayaKadha	Savithri		
2022	Ullasam	Nima's mother		
2024	Iyer in Arabia	Suma		
2024	Oru Anweshanathinte Thudakkam	Asha		
TBA	Daily Hero			

=== Television ===
Year	Title	Role	Channel	Notes	Ref.
	Sooryante Maranam		DD Malayalam	Debut serial; child artist	
2005	Mounam	Priya			
	Makal	Aparna	Surya TV		
2005-2006	Priyam		Kairali TV		
2006	Kanalppoovu		Jeevan TV		
2014-2015	Balaganapathy		Asianet		
2015	Parasparam		Asianet		
2015	Kalyana Sougandhikam		Asianet		
2015	Vishwaroopam		Flowers TV		
2015	Manassariyathe		Surya TV		
2015	Ganga	Soudamini	DD Malayalam		
2015	Thoovalsparsham		DD Malayalam		
2016	Kana Kanmani	Devayani	Asianet		
2016-2017	Krishnathulasi	Bhama	Mazhavil Manorama		
2016-2018	Rathri Mazha	Jayanthi Vishwanathan	Flowers TV		
2017	Mounam Sammatham				
2017-2020	Vanambadi	Nirmala	Asianet		
2017-2018	Mamangam		Flowers TV		
2018-2019	Bhramanam	Bindhuja Nair	Mazhavil Manorama		
2019-2021	Pookkalam Varavayi	Jyothirmayi	Zee Keralam		
2020-2021	Indulekha	Kalappurakkal Gowri Lakshmi	Surya TV		
2020-2021	Rakkuyil	Sairandri	Mazhavil Manorama		
2020	Swantham Sujatha	Appu's Mother	Surya TV	Special Appearance In Mega Episode	
2021	Aliyans	Pavithra Unnikrishnan	Kaumudy TV	Guest appearance	
2021–2024	Kaliveedu	Madhuri	Surya TV		
2023-2025	Geeta Govindam	Vilasini	Asianet		
2024	Manimuthu	Lakshmi	Mazhavil Manorama		
2025-2026	Peythozhiyathe	Hema	Surya TV	Replaced by Shalu Menon	
2026	Kasaragod Embassy		ZEE5	As producer	

==== Special appearances ====
Year	Title	Role	Channel	Notes	Ref.
2017	Onnum Onnum Moonu	Herself	Mazhavil Manorama		
2018	Njanannu Sthree	Panelist	Amrita TV		
2019	Start Music Aaradhyam Paadum	Herself	Asianet		
2022	Red Carpet	Mentor	Amrita TV		
2022	Day with a Star	Herself	Kaumudy TV		
2022	Salt n' Pepper	Herself	Kaumudy TV		

== Awards ==
- South Indian Cinema and Television Awards 2019
- Socialist Samskarika Kendra Mother Theresa Puraskaram 2022 - Best Character Role
- Asianet Television Awards 2018 - Best Star Pair
