= Kana Kanmani =

Kana Kanmani may refer to these in Indian media:

- Kana Kanmani (film), a 2009 family horror film
- Kana Kanmani (2016 TV series), a Malayalam soap opera
- Kana Kanmani (2021 TV series), a Malayalam soap opera

== See also ==
- Kanmani (disambiguation)
