= Kanmani =

Kanmani may refer to:

- Kanmani (album), a Malayalam-language album
- Kanmani (film), a 1994 Indian Tamil-language film
- Kanmani (TV series), a 2018 Indian Tamil language village family soap opera
- Kanmani (director), a Tamil and Telugu film director from India

== See also ==
- Kana Kanmani (disambiguation)
