= Gowri Krishnan =

Indian actress

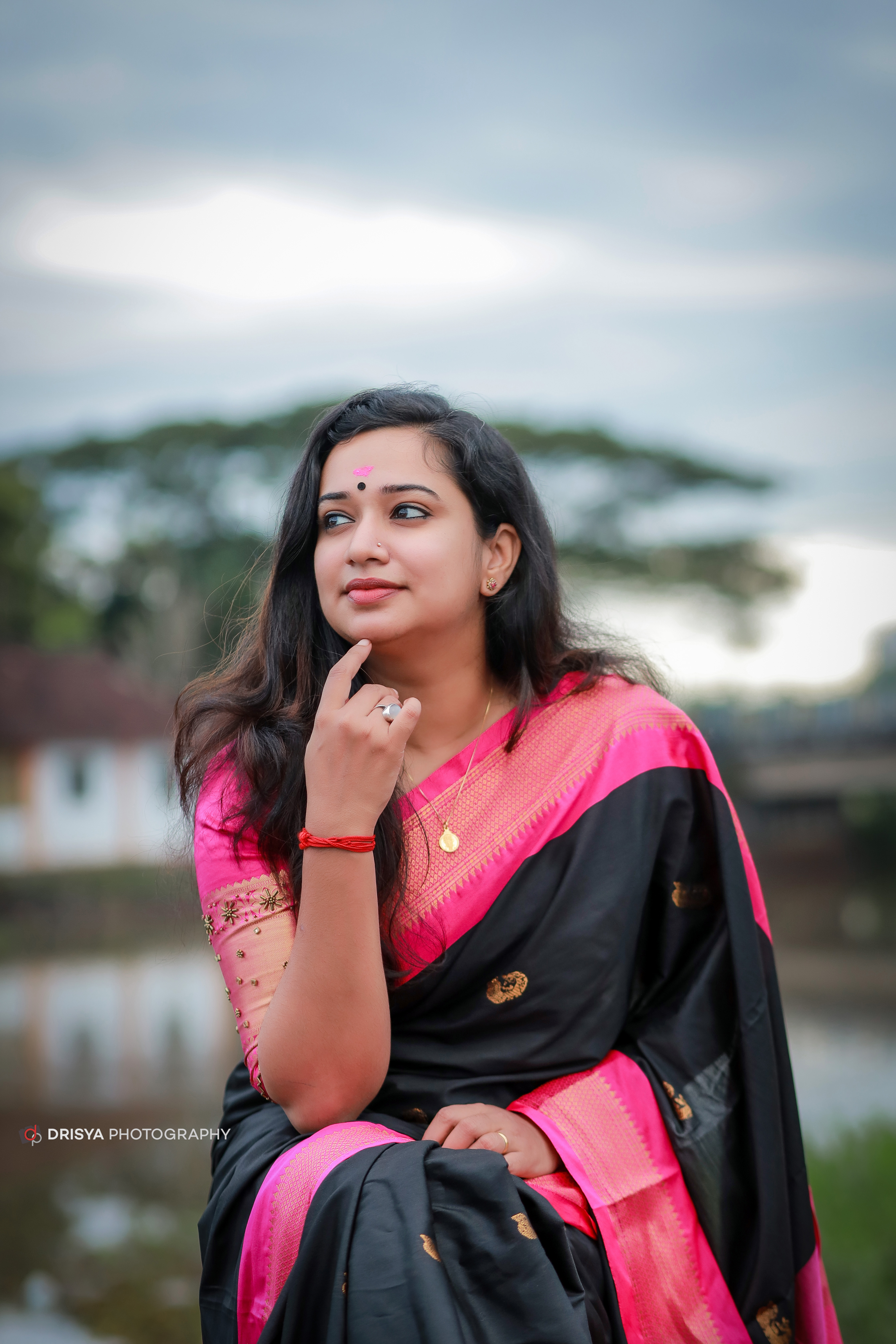
- Actress Gowri Krishnan
- Born: 29 October 1993 (age 33)
- Other name: Ponnu
- Occupation: Actress
- Years active: 2011–present
- Notable work: pournamithingal
- Spouse: Manoj
- Parent(s): Radhakrishnan & Maya Radhakrishnan

Gowri Krishnan is an Indian television actress who is known for her leading roles in Kana Kanmani and Pournami Thinkal. She won the Kerala television State award in 2017.

== Personal life ==
She became engaged to serial director Manoj on 11 February 2022 and married him on 24 November 2022. She is a strong believer of Karma.

Now she is divorced https://www.instagram.com/p/DWYSSDiD9fg/?igsh=bWducTFuNjJ3ZmNl

== Filmography ==
=== Television ===
•All works are in Malayalam, unless noted otherwise.

Year	Title	Role	Channel	Notes
2014-2015	Aniyathi	Gowri	Mazhavil Manorama	
2016	Kana Kanmani	Krishnendu	Asianet	
2017	Nilavum Nakshathrangalaum	Nandhu	Amrita TV	
2017-2018	Decemberile Aakasham	Swathi	Amrita TV	
2017-2018	Mamangam	Menaka	Flowers TV	
2018	Pranayini	Mili	Mazhavil Manorama	
2017-2019	Seetha	Devika Sreeraman	Flowers TV	
2018-2019	Ennu Swantham Jani	Jani	Surya TV	Replaced Devu Krishna
2019	Ayyappa Saranam	Malini, Mala, Sabari	Amrita TV	
2019-2021	Pournami Thinkal	Pournami	Asianet	
2019	Ennishtam	Herself	ACV	
2019	Start Music Aaradhyam Padum	Participant	Asianet	
2021	Kaiyethum Doorath	Minister Gayathri Devi	Zee Keralam	
2021–2022	Bhayam	Herself as contestant	Zee Keralam	
2022	Red Carpet	Mentor	Amrita TV	
2022	Vennakallan	Yashoda	YouTube	Album
2023	Flowers Oru Kodi	Participant	Flowers	Game show
2026–present	Sithara	Thara	Flowers TV	

=== Films ===
Year	Film	Role	Language	Ref.
2011	Traffic	Sudevan's Daughter	Malayalam	
2012	Mazhavillinattam Vare		Malayalam	
