= Dilsha Prasannan =

Indian actress and dancer (born 1991)

- Born: 25 June 1991 (age 35); Calicut, Kerala, India
- Years active: 2014 – present
- Known for: D4 Dance; Bigg Boss 4
- Height: 5.4

Dilsha Prasannan (born 25 June 1991) is an Indian television actress and dancer who works in the Malayalam industry.

== Career ==
In 2014, she competed in the dance reality program D 4 Dance season 1, finishing 5th position, and returned in the D 4 Dance Reloaded edition with pair Rinosh and emerged as the winner.

She appeared in one TV serial, Kana Kanmani (2016 TV series) where, she received the Best Debut award at the Asianet Television Awards in 2016. Later in 2017, she appeared on the reality show, Dare the Fear and made it to the finals.

In March 2022, Dilsha competed in the fourth season of Bigg Boss Malayalam, the Indian Malayalam language version of the reality TV show Bigg Boss and emerged as winner of that season.

== Television ==
| Year | TV Show | Channel | Role | Notes |
|---|---|---|---|---|
| 2014 | D 4 Dance season 1 | Mazhavil Manorama | Herself as Contestant | 5th Position |
| 2016 | D4 Dance Reloaded | Mazhavil Manorama | Herself as Contestant along with Rinosh | Winner |
| 2016 | Kana Kanmani | Asianet | Manasa | |
| 2016 | Dare the fear | Asianet | Herself as Contestant | 3rd Position |
| 2022 | Bigg Boss season 4 | Asianet | Herself as Contestant | Winner |
| 2023 | Dancing Stars | Asianet | Herself as Contestant along with Nasif Appu | 2nd Position |
| 2024 | Bigg Boss season 6 | Asianet | To perform a dance | |
| 2026 | Bigg Boss season 8 | Asianet | Challenger | |

== Filmography ==
- All films are in Malayalam language unless otherwise noted.

| Year | Film | Role | Notes |
|---|---|---|---|
| 2023 | Ohh Cindrella | Cindrella | Debut |
| 2024 | Amigo | Dancer | Tamil film |
| 2024 | Oru Anweshanathinte Thudakkam | Dancer | |
| 2025 | Sea of Love - Kadalolam Sneham | Jumaila | |
| 2026 | Maduramee Jeevitham | Dr. Lakshmi | |

== Awards and nominations ==
| Year | Award | Category | Work | Result |
|---|---|---|---|---|
| 2016 | Asianet Television Awards | Best New Face (Female) | Kana Kanmani | Won |
