= Kasaragod Embassy =

2026 Indian Malayalam-language crime thriller web series

- Genre: Crime thriller
- Written by: Heeraj
- Screenplay by: Heeraj
- Directed by: Atish M Nair
- Starring: Kabir Duhan Singh; Sudheesh; Rony David; Deepak Parambol; Dinesh Prabhakar
- Music by: Ratheesh Vega
- Country of origin: India
- Original language: Malayalam
- No. of seasons: 1
- No. of episodes: 7

Production
- Producer: Uma Nair
- Cinematography: Rjeesh T R
- Editor: Jilin Joseph
- Production company: Legendary Movies

Original release
- Network: ZEE5
- Release: March 20, 2026

Kasaragod Embassy is a 2026 Indian Malayalam-language crime thriller web series directed by Atish and written by Heeraj. It is produced by Uma Nair under the Legendary Movies banner, the series features Kabir Duhan Singh and Sudheesh in prominent roles. The seven-episode series premiered as a ZEE5 Original on 20 March 2026.

== Premise ==
Set in the late 2000s in the coastal town of Kasaragod, the story follows two cousins, Azi and Chemmu, who are living in extreme poverty. In a desperate attempt to improve their financial situation, they are lured into an illegal passport forgery and gold smuggling racket operated by their uncle, Razak Mama. As they descend deeper into the criminal underworld controlled by a powerful figure named Dammanna, the duo faces escalating moral dilemmas and life-threatening consequences.

== Cast ==
- Kabir Duhan Singh as Dammanna
- Arjun Raam as Pinto
- Sudheesh as Razak Mama
- Deepak Parambol as Vivek
- Rony David as Roy
- Dinesh Prabhakar

== Episodes ==
No.	Title	Directed by	Written by	Original release date
1	"Sleepless Nights Ahead"	Atish M Nair	Heeraj	20 March 2026
In Kasaragod, cousins Azi and Chemmu struggle with poverty and limited opportunities, leading them to consider illegal means to improve their circumstances.
2	"Warm Up"	Atish M Nair	Heeraj	20 March 2026
The duo is introduced to Roy, who involves them in a passport forgery operation, marking their entry into organised crime.
3	"Product Approved"	Atish M Nair	Heeraj	20 March 2026
As the operation expands, Azi and Chemmu become more involved, attracting attention from higher-level operators in the network.
4	"The Trap"	Atish M Nair	Heeraj	20 March 2026
Law enforcement begins investigating the forgery network, placing pressure on the group and exposing vulnerabilities.
5	"Upgrade and Disruption"	Atish M Nair	Heeraj	20 March 2026
Under the influence of crime lord Dammanna, the operation scales up, increasing both risk and complexity.
6	"House of Cards"	Atish M Nair	Heeraj	20 March 2026
A major setback exposes cracks within the network, leading to shifting alliances and rising tensions.
7	"Two Separate Ways"	Atish M Nair	Heeraj	20 March 2026
As events escalate, Azi and Chemmu face difficult choices while dealing with the consequences of their actions.

== Release ==
The official trailer was launched on 11 March 2026. The series was released in its entirety on 20 March 2026 on the streaming platform ZEE5.

== Reception ==
Sreejith Mullapilly of The New Indian Express rated the series 1.5/5 stars, stating it "stereotypes Kasaragod and its people" and fails to immerse the audience in its world. While noting the novelty of a series about the fake passport business, Mullappilly found the execution "way off the mark" and noted that most of the cast appeared "way out of their depth" due to one-note writing.

Sreeju Sudhakaran of Rediff.com was highly critical, describing the show as "ineptly put-together" with "nothing redeemable." Sudhakaran criticized the weak writing and amateurish execution, noting that the series felt like a "poorly made YouTube sketch" that lacked the storytelling depth and technical proficiency seen in similar genre works like The Chronicles of the 4.5 Gang.
