= Bigg Boss (Malayalam TV series) season 8 =

Indian reality show's 2026 episodes

Bigg Boss
- Season 8
- Presented by: Mohanlal
- No. of days: 77
- No. of housemates: 28
- No. of episodes: 78

Release
- Original network: Asianet; JioHotstar
- Original release: 6 September 2026

Series chronology
- ← Previous; Season 7

The eighth season of Bigg Boss, the Malayalam-language edition of the Indian reality television series, is hosted by Mohanlal for the eighth consecutive season. The season premiered on 6 September 2026 on Asianet, with episodes also streaming on JioHotstar.

The season was announced on 21 May 2026 by host Mohanlal on his birthday. The makers introduced a pre-show, Bigg Boss Agnipareeksha, to select commoner contestants for the main season. The main season began with 21 contestants, including four commoners selected through the pre-show. Two additional commoners and five other contestants subsequently entered the house as wild-card contestants, bringing the total number of contestants to 28, the highest in any version of Indian Bigg Boss.

== Production ==
=== Development ===
Following the conclusion of the seventh season, Mohanlal signed a contract to continue as the host of Bigg Boss Malayalam for three additional seasons, according to The Times of India.

In May 2026, reports indicated that the production team had begun preparations for the eighth season, including recruitment and production-related work.

=== Logo ===
The logo for the eighth season was unveiled on 21 May 2026, coinciding with Mohanlal's birthday. Reports about the logo highlighted the number 8, the franchise's eye motif and elements associated with the season's theme of democracy and the Agnipareeksha selection process.

=== House location ===
The eighth season is filmed at EVP Film City in Chennai, Tamil Nadu, where the Malayalam version's house was also located in the previous season.

== Pre-show ==
Bigg Boss Agnipareeksha is a pre-selection reality show introduced to select commoner contestants for the eighth season. The show premiered on 15 August 2026 on Asianet and JioHotstar. It was hosted by Reneesha Rahiman, with Akhil Marar, Riyas Salim and Ranjini Haridas serving as judges.

The pre-show, Bigg Boss Agnipareeksha, began with 40 commoner contestants competing for places in the main season. During the grand premiere of Bigg Boss Malayalam season 8, host Mohanlal revealed the four contestants who had secured places in the main Bigg Boss house: Eldho George, Rakesh Jacob, Loletta Loryne Rodrigues and Shijin S. Later, two more contestants, Shibina and Santhosh, entered the house as wild-card contestants.

== Housemates status ==
Sr	Housemate	Day entered	Day exited	Status
1	Aiswarya	Day 0		
2	Azif	Day 0		
3	Gautham	Day 0		
4	Mridula	Day 0	Day 27	SecretRoom
4	Mridula	Day 32		
5	Neha	Day 0		
6	Noby	Day 0		
7	Rahul	Day 0		
8	Shijin	Day 0		
9	Sreeraj	Day 0		
10	Vipin	Day 28		
11	Vignesh	Day 0	Day 77	Evicted
12	Santhosh	Day 7	Day 76	Evicted
13	Anjali	Day 0	Day 27	SecretRoom
13	Anjali	Day 32	Day 70	Evicted
14	Nowfina	Day 36	Day 63	Evicted
15	Vedangi	Day 28	Day 56	Evicted
16	Nilina	Day 28	Day 42	Evicted
17	Eldho	Day 0	Day 35	Evicted
18	Suvarna	Day 28	Day 30	Walked
19	Sreelakshmi	Day 0	Day 27	Evicted
20	Jaseela	Day 0	Day 27	Evicted
21	Sumesh	Day 0	Day 27	Evicted
22	Gayathri	Day 0	Day 2	Evicted
22	Gayathri	Day 9	Day 27	Re-evicted
23	Loletta	Day 0	Day 27	Evicted
24	Rakesh	Day 0	Day 27	Evicted
25	Shibina	Day 7	Day 21	Evicted
26	Sreelaya	Day 0	Day 14	Evicted
27	Rini	Day 0	Day 7	Evicted
28	Dhanya	Day 0	Day 6	Evicted

== Housemates ==
The participants are given below in the order of their entrance into the Bigg Boss House.

=== Original entrants ===
- Gayathri Suresh - Actor, model and dancer
- Sreeraj K S (Kadal Komban) - Content creator, adventurer
- Mridula Vijay - Television actor
- Sreelakshmi Arackal - Social activist
- Vignesh Venu (Wikky Thug) - Content creator
- Rini Ann George - Actress, model, journalist
- Noby Binu - Actor and writer
- Aiswarya Madhu - Radio Jockey
- Sreelaya - Television actor and dancer
- Anjali - Radio Jockey and actor
- Sumesh Chandran - Film and television actor.
- Neha Fathima - Content creator
- Dhanya (Kaali) - Fight master, actor, dancer, and bike rider
- Gautham G Sasi - Stand-up comedian
- Muhammad Azif (Azifeeee) - Content creator
- Jaseela Parveen - Actor, model and content creator
- Rahul Easwar - Social activist
- Eldho George - Teacher, politician (commoner) - Selected from the Agnipareeksha
- Rakesh Jacob – Carpenter (commoner) - Selected from the Agnipareeksha
- Loletta Loryne Rodrigues – Student (commoner) - Selected from the Agnipareeksha
- Shijin S - Dance coach (commoner) - Selected from the Agnipareeksha

=== Wildcard entrants ===
- Shibina – Model (commoner) -Selected from the Agnipareeksha
- Santhosh Raj (Tashi) – Digital strategist (commoner) -Selected from the Agnipareeksha
- Nilina Elizabeth Joseph – Model
- Suvarna Pulthukkiyil – Linguist and physicist
- Vipin Das Nair – Actor
- Vedangi Cherukattu – Advocate and social media influencer
- Nowfna Sabu – Content creator

== Guest appearances ==
Week(s)	Day(s)	Guest(s)	Purpose of visit
Week 1	Day 0	Mohanlal	To introduce the season 8 Bigg Boss house.
Week 3	Day 21	Dain Davis, Vidya Vijay and Harishma	On stage with Mohanlal to promote web series Prince of Mollywood.
Week 6	Day 42	Mithun Ramesh, Amit Syngle (CEO & MD of Asian Paints)	On stage with Mohanlal to promote asian paints.
Week 9	Day 63	Mohanlal	Deepavali celebration with contastants.
Week 10	Day 64-70	Ga Cha	A large pink teddy bear introduced as a guest for task.
Week 10	Day 65-68	Guests / Season / Day(s); Akhil Kutty / Season 4 Contestants / Day 65; Dilsha Prasannan / Season 4 Contestants / Day 65; Muhammad Diligent Blesslee / Season 4 Contestants / Day 65; Riyas Salim / Season 4 Contestants / Day 65; Robin Radhakrishnan / Season 4 Contestants / Day 65; Suchitra Nair / Season 4 Contestants / Day 65; Aiswarya Suresh / Season 5 Contestants / Day 66; Akhil Marar / Season 5 Contestants / Day 66; Aniyan Midhun / Season 5 Contestants / Day 66; Cerena Ann Johnson / Season 5 Contestants / Day 66; Nadira Mehrin / Season 5 Contestants / Day 66; Vishnu Joshi / Season 5 Contestants / Day 66; Ansiba Hassan / Season 6 Contestants / Day 67; Gabri Jose / Season 6 Contestants / Day 67; Jaanmoni Das / Season 6 Contestants / Day 67; Jasmin Jaffer / Season 6 Contestants / Day 67; Jinto Devassykutty / Season 6 Contestants / Day 67; Rishi S Kumar / Season 6 Contestants / Day 67; Sai Krishna / Season 6 Contestants / Day 67; Abhilash S / Season 7 Contestants / Day 68; Akbar Khan / Season 7 Contestants / Day 68; Anumol RS / Season 7 Contestants / Day 68; Aneesh Tharayil / Season 7 Contestants / Day 68; Aryan Kathuria / Season 7 Contestants / Day 68; Lakshmi Harikrishnan / Season 7 Contestants / Day 68; Nevin Cappresious / Season 7 Contestants / Day 68; Noora Fathima / Season 7 Contestants / Day 68	Legacy Week
Week 10	Day 70	Mithun Ramesh, Rizwan Sajan (Danube Group, Founder & Chairman)	To promote Danube Group
Week 12	Day 78-82	TBA	Family week

== Weekly summary ==
Week 1	Entrances	On Day 0: During the season premiere on 6 September 2026, hosted by Mohanlal, a total of 21 housemates entered the Bigg Boss house. The contestants, introduced in sequence, were: Gayathri Suresh, Sreeraj K. S., Mridula Vijay, Sreelakshmi Arackal, Vignesh Venu, Rini Ann George, Noby Binu, Aiswarya Madhu, Sreelaya, RJ Anjali, Sumesh Chandran, Neha Fathima, Dhanya, Gautham G Sasi, Muhammed Asif, Jaseela Parveen and Rahul Easwar as the celebrity contestants and Eldho George, Rakesh Jacob, Loletta Loryne Rodrigues and Shijin S as the commoner contestants.
Week 1	House leader	Jaseela
Week 1	House leader	Supporters : Mridula and Sumesh
Week 1	Nominations	On Day 1: Asif, Dhanya, Eldho, Neha, Noby, Rahul, Rini, Shijin and Sreeraj were nominated by housemates for eviction process for the first week.
Week 1	Task	House leader task: On Day 1: One person had to come with two supporters to compete in the leadership task. Each team had to stand on the podiums kept in the garden area. There were three pairs of podiums, and each pair consisted of three podiums. The teams had to compete against each other and remain standing on the podiums until the buzzer sounded. Eldho, Jaseela, and Noby became the final leadership nominees. The housemates then voted, and Jaseela won. She, along with her supporters Mridula and Sumesh, received nomination immunity as a reward.
Week 1	Task	Mid-week eviction: On Day 2: Bigg Boss asked all the housemates to gather in the special room called "Janasabha". He asked them to choose one housemate for eviction. The final decision was given to the leader of the week, Jaseela, who chose Gayathri for eviction. Bigg Boss then evicted Gayatri from the house.
Week 1	Task	Weekly task: Day 2 to 4: Puthunagaram; Bigg Boss announced that the house had been turned into a demolished Bigg Boss city, with its facilities no longer functioning. The housemates had to rebuild the city through weekly tasks, which included reopening the bedroom and restoring the water and gas supplies by completing various physical challenges. The House Leader and their supporters were secretly given a fund of ₹100,000 to improve the house and complete the tasks. If they spent more than ₹50,000, they would lose their chance to continue in power the following week, while spending less than ₹50,000 would give them a chance to remain in power.
Week 1	Jail	On Day 5 : The housemates voted for Sreeraj, Sreelaya, Sreelakshmi to jail for the week. Following the leader's decision, Sreeraj & Sreelaya were sent to jail.
Week 1	Exits	On Day 2: Gayathri Suresh was evicted from the house following the decision of the house leader.; On Day 6: Dhanya was evicted from the Bigg Boss House after facing public voting.; On Day 7: Rini Ann George was evicted from the Bigg Boss House after facing public voting.
Week 2	Entrances	On Day 7: Shibina and Santhosh Raj entered the Bigg Boss house as wild card commoner contestants, playing as a single contestant.; On Day 9: Gayathri Suresh re-enterd the house.
Week 2	House leader	Rahul
Week 2	House leader	Supporters : Vignesh and Loletta
Week 2	Nominations	On Day 8: Aiswarya, Anjali, Jaseela, Loletta. Neha, Noby, Sreelakshmi, Sreelaya, Sreeraj and Sumesh were nominated by housemates for eviction process for this week.
Week 2	Task	House leader task: On Day 8: The week one's leadership spent the allotted fund within the permitted limit and was eligible to continue if they won the Confidence Vote. They lost the vote, resulting in the collapse of the leadership. In a new election, Eldho was elected House Leader with 15 votes. However, Bigg Boss offered a chance to bring back evicted housemate Gayatri if Eldho resigned and handed the leadership to Rahul. Eldho accepted, and Rahul became the new House Leader. Leader then selected Vignesh Venu and Loletta Loryne Rodrigues as supporters.
Week 2	Task	Weekly task: Day 9 to 11: BB City 2.0; This week, the House Leader and their team had ₹70,000 remaining from the previous week's fund. The housemates earned money as salaries by completing weekly tasks, while the House Leader and their team acted as the authority responsible for awarding contracts for the rebuilding work. The tasks involved renovating and rebuilding different parts of BB City, including roads, bridges and other infrastructure. The top two housemates who earned the most money during the tasks were directly nominated for the House Leader task.
Week 2	Jail	On Day 12 : The housemates voted for Mridula, Aiswarya and Tashi & Shibina to jail for the week. After losing the task, Mridula and Aiswarya were sent to jail.
Week 2	Exits	On Day 14: Sreelaya was evicted from the Bigg Boss House after facing public voting.
Week 3
Week 3	House leader	Noby
Week 3	House leader	Supporters : Santhosh and Rakesh
Week 3	Nominations	On Day 11: Rakesh, Shijin and Mridula were directly nominated to eviction process for this week.; On Day 15: Two hammers and eggs bearing the contestants' photos will be placed in the garden. After the buzzer, contestants race to grab the hammers. The leader decides who gets the chance to use the hammer to smash the eggs in each round. There will be seven rounds, and only those who get the chance to smash an egg will be eligible to nominate.; Aiswarya, Gautham, Gayathri, Jaseela, Mridula, Rakesh, Shibina, Shijin, Sreeraj and Sumesh were nominated by housemates for eviction process for this week.
Week 3	Task	House leader task: On Day 12: Noby and Asif were directly selected as the top performers of the weekly task, while Gayathri was selected by the House Leader of week 2 for the House Leader task. Three containers will be placed in the garden area. After the buzzer, snowballs will fall from the sky, and the nominees and their supporters must collect the balls and place them in their respective containers. Noby won the task.
Week 3	Task	Weekly task: Day 16 to 18: As part of the weekly task, all housemates except the House Leader and their supporters were denied entry to the house and had to stay in the garden area, where only limited resources were available. They could use the toilets only with permission from the House Leader and their team. Through a series of tasks, the outsiders competed for the opportunity to enter the house and join the ruling team, allowing them to access the house and its facilities.
Week 3	Jail	On Day 19 : The housemates voted for Santhosh , Shijin and Shibina to jail for the week. After the court task, as instructed by the leader Santhosh and Shijin were sent to jail.
Week 3	Exits	On Day 21: Shibina was evicted from the Bigg Boss House after facing public voting.
Week 4
Week 4	House leader	Shijin
Week 4	House leader	Supporters : Sreeraj and Neha
Week 4	Nominations	* On Day 20: Aiswarya, Anjali, Asif, Eldho, Gautham, Gayathri, Jaseela, Loletta, Mridula, Neha, Noby, Rahul, Rakesh, Sreelakshmi, Sreeraj, Sumesh, Santhosh and Vignesh were directly nominated for eviction process for this week.
Week 4	Task	House leader task: On Day 22 & 23: Bigg Boss asked the housemates to select five leadership candidates, each of whom then chose five supporters. The supporters competed on behalf of their respective candidates. The winning candidate and their supported contestant then competed against each other in the leadership task, after which the housemates voted to select the leader.
Week 4	Task	Weekly task: Day 23 to 25: Ghost house in; The basic story of the task was that Peeli, a girl from a village, fell in love with a young man, but his family killed her to prevent their marriage. After her death, she returned as a ghost, killed the family and formed a group of followers. Years later, she attacked a forest guard, but Mepadan helped him escape, leaving him with nail scars that allowed him to move between the 'Amanushikar' and the 'Gramavasikal'. After many years, Peeli returned again. Bigg Boss divided the housemates into two groups, the 'Amanushikar' and the 'Gramavasikal', with one housemate designated as the forest guard. The 'Gramavasikal' lived in the house, while the activity area served as the home of the 'Amanushikar' and the garden area as the forest. During the tasks, both groups competed to bring members of the opposing group into their own group and could also collect special lockets. At the end of the task, the group with the greater number of members or lockets would win the weekly task.
Week 4	Jail	On Day 26 : The housemates voted for Azif, Sreeraj and Noby to jail for the week. Following the leader's decision, Sreeraj and Noby were sent to jail.
Week 4	Secret Room	On Day 27: Mridula and Anjali were moved to Secret room
Week 4	Exits	On Day 27: Rakesh, Loletta, Gayathri, Sumesh, Jaseela and Sreelakshmi were evicted from the Bigg Boss House after facing public voting.
Week 5
Week 5	Entrances	On Day 28: Nilina Elizabeth Joseph, Suvarna Pulthukkiyil, Vipin Nair and Vedangi Cherukattu entered the Bigg Boss house as wild card contestants.
Week 5	House leader	Nilina, Suvarna, Vedangi & Vipin
Week 5	Nominations	On Day 29: Aiswarya, Asif, Eldho, Gautham, Rahul,Shijin, Sreeraj, Tashi and Vignesh were nominated by housemates for eviction process for this week.
Week 5	Task	Weekly task: Day 30 to 32: Mittayi Pattanam; The task featured three types of sweets: red (50 points), blue (30 points), and yellow (10 points). During the task, sweets were released in different ways, and whenever the bell rang, housemates had to collect as many sweets as possible and place them in jars kept on fixed pedestals, which could not be moved. Bigg Boss also announced that two invisible guests were participating in the task, referring to the contestants in the secret room, who could give high-value sweets to the housemate they considered the best performer. At the end, the housemate with the highest total value of sweets won and could choose between bringing back one evicted contestant or receiving two weeks' immunity from eviction, while the housemate with the lowest total value was directly nominated for the following week's eviction.
Week 5	Task	On Day 33: Leader Rating; Bigg Boss asked the housemates to rate each leader. At the end of the task, Vedangi received the most stars and became one of the nominees for the leadership task of week 6.
Week 5	Exits	On Day 30: Suvarna voluntarily walked out of the Bigg Boss house due to health issues.; On Day 35: Eldho was evicted from the Bigg Boss House after facing public voting.
Week 6
Week 6	Entrances	On Day 36: Nowfina Sabu entered the Bigg Boss house as wild card contestant.
Week 6	House leader	Sreeraj
Week 6	Nominations	On Day 36: Bigg Boss divided the housemates into five pairs and one group of three. Each group was called into the confession room, where they were asked to select one member to be nominated for this week's eviction process and another member to be exempted from the nominations. As a result, Aiswarya, Anjali, Azif, Neha, Nilina, Noby, Rahul, Santhosh, Shijin and Vedangi were nominated for eviction this week.
Week 6	Task	House leader task: On Day 36: The housemates selected Sreeraj to compete against Vedangi, who had been nominated for the captaincy task the previous week. The two contestants competed in a bridge-building task, placing two-coloured platform blocks onto a structure set up in the garden area. The contestant who placed the most blocks without leaving any gaps would win the task.
Week 6	Task	Weekly task: Day 37 to 39 : BB Adholokam; The Bigg Boss house is transformed into an underworld hideout ruled by the ruthless don Azif and his bodyguard Noby, managed by Nowfina and assistant manager Shijin, with Anjali as the international chef, Nilina and Vipin as entertainers, Mridula and Vignesh as rival gangsters plotting to kill opposing gang members, Neha and Sreeraj as undercover secret agents whose identities will be revealed later, and Rahul, Santhosh, Vedangi, Gautam and Aiswarya as gangster guests, while Bigg Boss assigns secret missions to selected housemates throughout the task.
Week 6	Jail	On Day 40 : The housemates voted for Noby and Rahul to jail for the week. By using the special power earned through a secret task, the Week 5 wildcards sent Noby to jail.
Week 6	Exits	On Day 42: Nilina was evicted from the Bigg Boss House after facing public voting.
Week 7
Week 7	House leader	Mridula
Week 7	Nominations	On Day 43: Bigg Boss announced an open nomination process for the week. In the garden area, each contestant had to nominate two housemates by explaining their reason and smashing a disposable plate filled with shaving foam against the nominated contestants' face. As a result, Aiswarya, Anjali, Noby, Nowfina, Rahul Santhosh, Vedangi, Vignesh and Vipin were nominated for eviction this week.
Week 7	Task	House leader task: On Day 40: Mridula was directly nominated as a House Leader nominee through the weekly task, while Asif was selected by the housemates. In the House Leader task, contestants had to paint a white rectangular board using brushes attached to helmets. The current week's House Leader would decide the winner.
Week 7	Task	Pre-task: On Day 43 : Bigg Boss asked the housemates to split into two teams, with the House Leader serving as the judge. A large basket was placed at the centre of a large circle in the garden area. In each round, one contestant from one team had to place a basketball into the basket while a contestant from the opposing team attempted to defend it. Throwing the ball was not allowed, and if either the ball or a player stepped outside the circle, the defending team would earn points. The teams took turns attacking and defending over a total of six rounds, with the winning team receiving a special advantage in this week's weekly task, which would be announced later.
Week 7	Task	Weekly task: Day 44 to 45 : Kappal Yathra; A ship model was placed in the garden area. The current House Leader, Mridula, would initially serve as the captain and select the other housemates to join her on the ship, maximum six including the captain. The winning team of the pre-task could replace one of the captain's selected housemates with a teammate. At specific intervals, depending on the sea conditions, Bigg Boss would announce whether the number of voyagers had to be increased or decreased, and the captain would decide accordingly. If the captain decided to leave the ship, she had to appoint another housemate as the new captain, and anyone who left the ship was not allowed to return. At designated intervals, the housemates outside the ship could participate in gold mining in the activity area, and whenever the siren sounded to indicate that the ship had reached the dock, the miners had to hand over all their collected gold to one or more trusted housemates aboard the ship without keeping any for themselves. Similarly, any housemate leaving the ship had to transfer their gold to one or more housemates remaining aboard. At the end of the task, the housemate who had stayed aboard the ship for the longest time and the housemate holding the most gold could each select one person from the miners, and the three selected housemates would compete in a special task, with the winner receiving an eviction-free card. Goutham completed the weekly task by spending 29 hours aboard the ship, while Vipin collected 93 gold coins. Both contestants selected Aiswarya to compete in the challenge.
Week 7	Task	Eviction free card challenge: On Day 47 : Three containers filled with thermocol balls were placed in the garden area. At each buzzer, the task participants, along with the other housemates, would attack the containers. At the end of the task, the participant who had a container containing thermocol balls would be declared the winner. Vipin won the task.
Week 7	Jail	On Day 47 : The housemates voted for Rahul and Vedangi, who were sent to jail.
Week 7	Exits	No Eviction
Week 8
Week 8	House leader	Aiswarya
Week 8	Nominations	On Day 50: Anjali, Mridula, Noby, Rahul, Santhosh, Shijin and Vedangi were nominated by housemates for eviction process for this week.
Week 8	Task	House leader task: On Day 49: At the activity area, the contestants will take turns listening to a sequence of voices. After the buzzer sounds, each contestant must place the magnetic photos on the board in the order they heard the voices. Mridula will judge the task, and the contestant who places the most photos in the correct order will win.
Week 8	Task	Ticket to week 12: On Day 50: Bigg Boss announced a task in which contestants could bid up to 50% of the season's prize money (₹2.5 million), with the highest unique bidder winning immunity until Week 12, provided they were not evicted in the current week, while the winning bid would be deducted from the prize money. If two or more contestants placed the same bid, their bids would be cancelled, and the next-highest unique bid would be considered. Vipin had to forfeit his eviction-free pass to participate, and Rahul Easwar won the task with a bid of ₹24,999.95
Week 8	Task	Weekly task: Day 51 to 53 : Bigg Boss asked the current house leader, Aiswarya, and eviction-free pass winner Vipin to form two teams for the weekly task. Aiswarya selected Anjali, Asif, Neha, Noby, Nowfina and Vedangi, while Vipin selected Goutham, Mridula, Santhosh, Sreeraj, Shijin and Vignesh. The losing team was required to eliminate three of its members, who would become ineligible to become house leader for the remainder of the season. In the final task, Anjali, Nowfina and Vedangi challenged three other housemates and won, defeating Neha, Noby and Santhosh. As a result, Neha, Noby and Santhosh became ineligible to become house leader for the remainder of the season. Only members of the winning team will be eligible for next week's house leader task and this week's luxury budget task. Rahul Easwar, the winner of the Ticket to Week 12 task, judged all the weekly tasks.
Week 8	Jail	On Day 54 : The housemates voted for Rahul and Sreeraj, who were sent to jail.
Week 8	Exits	On Day 56: Vedangi was evicted from the Bigg Boss House after facing public voting.
Week 9
Week 9	House leader	Vignesh
Week 9	Nominations	On Day 57: In the garden area, photographs of the contestants were placed on individual pedestals. Each contestant was required to select two photographs, one at a time, and burn each photograph using a jet flame while explaining their reasons for nominating the respective contestants. However, photographs of House Leader Vignesh, Ticket to Week 12 winner Rahul, and direct nominee Noby were not placed on the pedestals. At the end of the task, Vignesh was given the power, as House Leader, to directly nominate one contestant for eviction. Following the nomination process, Aiswarya, Anjali, Mridula, Noby, Nowfina, Santhosh, Sreeraj and Vipin were nominated for eviction this week.
Week 9	Task	House leader task: On Day 54: Bigg Boss asked the housemates to choose two contestants from the weekly task-winning team to participate in the leadership task. In the garden area, two specially constructed boxes were set up, allowing the contestants to sit on pedestals with their heads positioned inside the boxes from below. Each contestant was supported by two teammates. The supporters had to take turns filling a mug with water, carrying it through a tyre and over a plank before reaching the opposing contestant's box and pouring the water inside. After each round, the supporters switched roles and repeated the process. As the water level rose, the contestants had to endure the increasing water pressure and discomfort. Each contestant was provided with a rope that they could pull to lower themselves down, which also drained the water and ended the competition. The first contestant to pull the rope lost the task, while the one who remained without pulling it won and was declared the next house leader.
Week 9	Task	Weekly task: Day 58 to 60: Operation Last Missile; The objective was for contestants to protect their individual missiles from opponents and safely store them inside the bunker. Initially, the bunker was equipped with only 12 shelves for the 14 contestants. When the buzzer sounded, contestants were required to cross the designated markings and frames in the garden area, reach the pit, collect their assigned individual missiles, and return through the frames to place them on the shelves. Contestants were not allowed to pick up the missile bearing their own name and were required to collect a missile belonging to another contestant. At the sound of the second buzzer, the collected missiles had to be placed on the shelves inside the bunker. At the end of each round, contestants whose names appeared on the remaining missiles that could not be accommodated inside the bunker would be eliminated.
Week 9	Task	On Day 59 to 63: Atom Bomb; Alongside the weekly task, a secret hiding task was assigned to the contestants. An 'Atom Bomb', along with four dummy bombs, was placed at a specially designated location in the living area. The original Atom Bomb was positioned on a small pedestal on a table, while the four dummy bombs were placed inside a box on the same table. A contestant was required to secretly replace the original Atom Bomb with one of the dummy bombs, placing it in exactly the same position, and hide the original without being noticed by the other housemates. The contestant had to keep the original Atom Bomb hidden until the upcoming weekend episode hosted by Mohanlal and present it when asked by the host. Upon successfully completing the task, the contestant would be rewarded with ₹4,99,999.95, an amount deducted from the final prize money during the previous week's Ticket to Week 12 task. Shijin won the task and received prize money.
Week 9	Exits	On Day 63: Nowfina was evicted from the Bigg Boss House after facing public voting.
Week 10
Week 10	House leader	Neha
Week 10	Nominations	On Day 64: Bigg Boss announced an open nomination process for the week, in which each contestant was required to nominate two housemates one by one in the garden area, explaining their reasons while the nominated contestants sat on a chair and had a jug of muddy water poured over their heads. The process was to take place at different intervals as instructed by Bigg Boss. However, Bigg Boss found that some housemates (Anjali, Noby & Santhosh) had violated the house rules by discussing nominations with others. As a consequence, Bigg Boss nominated all the housemates for eviction this week.
Week 10	Task	House leader task: On Day 60: Bigg Boss announced that the winner of the Week 9 weekly task would become the House Leader for Week 10.
Week 10	Task	Ga Cha guest task: On Day 64: Bigg Boss introduced a large pink teddy bear named Ga Cha as a guest and instructed the housemates to treat it as one. The housemates were then asked to take turns holding the teddy bear. They were allowed to pass it to another housemate but were not permitted to place it down. Each time the teddy bear was placed down, 10% of the house's ration budget was deducted. The task concluded late that night.
Week 10	Task	Legends vs Season 8 Housemates: Day 65 to 68 : Bigg Boss announced a special task for this week in which the housemates would compete against legendary former contestants who entered the house. By winning each task, the housemates would have an opportunity to recover a percentage of the amount deducted from the final prize money.; Task 1: Star War (Season 4 Legends vs Season 8 Housemates): On Day 65: Bigg Boss asked the housemates to select six members to participate in the task. The team members had to take turns picking up a ball from the starting point, walking across a plank, stepping onto a moving star and placing the ball into one of the six holders. If a ball fell at any point, the team had to restart from the beginning. The team that placed all six balls, or the most balls within the given time, would win the task. If the Season 8 contestants won, ₹2,00,000 would be added back to their lost prize money pool. If they lost, the money would remain lost permanently. The Season 8 housemates won the task, and ₹2,00,000 was added to the prize money.; Task 2: Coin Relay Challenge (Season 5 Legends vs Season 8 Housemates): On Day 66: This was a best-of-three relay race. The Housemates selected six participants to compete against the Legends on a triangular track in the garden area. In each round, one player from each team had to run along the marked path carrying a baton and flip two coins at each of the three designated boxes, one displaying their team's colour and the other the Bigg Boss logo. After completing the task, they passed the baton to the next teammate. The first team to successfully flip the coins in all three boxes won the round. The team that won two of the three rounds won the challenge. A Housemates victory would restore ₹2 lakh to their prize pool, while a Legends victory meant the amount would be permanently lost. The Season 8 housemates won the task, and ₹2,00,000 was added to the prize money.; Task 3: Tile Smash Challenge (Season 6 Legends vs Season 8 Housemates): On Day 67: This is a best-of-three challenge in which two members from each team must compete in each round. In the activity area, each team will have a stand with tiles stacked in five rows and a weight attached to a rope positioned on top. Upon hearing the buzzer, the participants must pull and release the rope, using the swinging weight to break the tiles in each row. The participants can decide whether both members or only one of them will take part in breaking the tiles. The first team to break all the tiles wins the round and earns one point. The team that scores the most points across the three rounds will win the task. If the Season 8 contestants win, ₹2 lakh from the previously lost prize money will be added back to the prize pool, whereas if the Legends win, the amount will be permanently lost. The Season 8 housemates lost the task.; Task 4: Tile Roll Challenge (Season 7 Legends vs Season 8 Housemates): On Day 68: Planks were placed in the garden area, with a tumbler, balls and team-coloured tiles provided at one end of each plank. When the buzzer sounds, one participant from each team must come forward and arrange all the tiles in a row on top of their plank. They must then roll a ball over the tiles and successfully drop it into the tumbler at the end. After each successful attempt, the tiles must be returned to the pedestal before the next participant takes their turn. All team members take turns competing, while both teams are required to closely observe their opponents' gameplay. The first team to successfully drop three balls into the tumbler wins the task. If the Season 8 Housemates win, ₹2,00,000 from the lost prize money will be restored to the current prize pool; otherwise, if the Legends win, the amount will be permanently lost to the Housemates. The Season 8 housemates lost the task.
Week 10	Exits	On Day 70: Anjali was evicted from the Bigg Boss House after facing public voting.
Week 11
Week 11	House leader	Azif
Week 11	Nominations	On Day 69: Following Mohanlal's announcement that there would be no regular nomination process this week, only the three directly nominated contestants; Azif, Santhosh and Vignesh were nominated for eviction.
Week 11	Task	House leader task: On Day 71: Leader Train; A model metro train with seats was set up in the garden area, with fewer seats available than the total number of housemates in each round. Whenever the train sound played, the contestants had to rush to secure a seat, while those who failed to do so were eliminated from that round. However, eliminated housemates were allowed to discuss among themselves and negotiate swaps with contestants who had secured seats, allowing them to re-enter the competition while the housemate they swapped with had to step out. The number of available seats decreased in each subsequent round, with the elimination and swapping process repeated until only two contestants remained for the final round. When the train sound played for the final time, the first contestant to reach and occupy the last remaining seat won the task and became the leader for the 11th week. Although Nobi, Tashi, and Neha, who were ineligible to become the leader again that season, were permitted to participate, if any of them won, they would have to hand over the leadership position to another eligible housemate.
Week 11	Task	Weekly task: Day 72 to 76: Bluff Master; In this task, 12 numbered briefcases are arranged on pedestals in the activity area, with only one containing valuable rewards worth ₹4,00,000 along with the power to become the House Leader for the following week. Each contestant must select a briefcase of their choice. The contestant who selects the briefcase containing the rewards must keep its contents a complete secret from the other housemates, while all the remaining contestants must try to identify who holds the lucky briefcase. Several individual and group tasks will be conducted as part of this challenge. After each task, the housemates will attempt to guess who possesses the lucky briefcase. If they correctly identify the holder, that contestant will be eliminated from the weekly task, and all remaining contestants must return to the activity area and select their briefcases again. If the guess is incorrect, one contestant will still be eliminated from the task, but the briefcases will remain unchanged. Certain individual tasks will also provide contestants with an opportunity to swap their briefcases, while in group tasks, one representative from each group will receive clues about the identity of the lucky briefcase holder. At the end of all the tasks, the contestant who retains the lucky briefcase will be declared the winner of the weekly task. However, the task was later terminated after contestant Neha seriously violated the rules by revealing to the other housemates that she had received the lucky briefcase. Later that day, Bigg Boss restarted the task without Neha's participation. Santhosh, Sreeraj and Vignesh exposed Aiswarya as the Bluff Master, won the weekly task, and shared the prize money equally among themselves.
Week 11	Exits	On Day 76: Santhosh was evicted from the Bigg Boss House after facing public voting.; On Day 77: Vignesh was evicted from the Bigg Boss House after facing public voting.
Week 12
Week 12	House leader	Sreeraj
Week 12	Nominations	On Day 78: TBA
Week 12	Task	House leader task: On Day 76: After winning the weekly task, the co-winners selected Santhosh as the House Leader. However, following his eviction, Sreeraj was appointed as the new House Leader.
Week 12	Jail	On Day 78: Due to a rule violation during the previous week's task, Bigg Boss sent Neha to jail.
Week 12	Exits	TBA

== Nomination table ==
	Week 1	Week 2	Week 3	Week 4	Week 5	Week 6	Week 7	Week 8	Week 9	Week 10	Week 11	Week 12	Week 13	Week 14
	Week 1	Week 2	Week 3	Week 4	Week 5	Week 6	Week 7	Week 8	Week 9	Week 10	Week 11	Week 12	Week 13	Finale
Nominees for House Leader	Eldho; Jaseela; Noby	Eldho; Rahul	Noby; Azif; Gayathri	Shijin; Sreeraj	None	Sreeraj; Vedangi	Azif; Mridula	Aiswarya; Neha; Nowfina	Goutham; Vignesh	All; Housemates	All; Housemates	All; Housemates		None
House Leader	Jaseela	~~Eldho~~; Rahul	Noby	Shijin	Nilina; ~~Suvarna~~; Vedangi; Vipin	Sreeraj	Mridula	Aiswarya	Vignesh	Neha	Azif	~~Santhosh~~; Sreeraj		None
Supporters of Leader	Mridula; Sumesh	Vignesh; Loletta	Santhosh; Rakesh	Sreeraj; Neha	Concept ended									
BB Prison	Sreeraj; Sreelaya	Mridula; Aiswarya	Santhosh; Shijin	Sreeraj; Noby	None	Noby	Rahul; Vedangi	Rahul; Sreeraj	None			Neha	None	
Player of the week	Shijin	Noby	Azif	None	Vipin	None	Gautam	None	Shijin	None	Aiswarya			None
Vote to:	Evict					Evict/Save	Evict							WIN
Aiswarya	Neha; Rahul	Sumesh; Neha	Not eligible	Nominated	Sreeraj; Shijin	Shijin (to evict)	Vignesh; Anjali	Shijin; Mridula	Azif; Neha	Nominated	Not eligible			
Azif	Dhanya; Shijin	Aiswarya; Sreelaya	Not eligible	Nominated	Sreeraj; Aiswarya	Gautham; Vignesh (to save)	Noby; Aiswarya	Anjali; Shijin	Nowfina; Aiswarya	Nominated	Nominated			
Gautham	Rini; Shijin	Anjali; Sreelaya	Not eligible	Nominated	Shijin; Sreeraj	Azif (to evict)	Vedangi; Noby	Shijin; Azif	Aiswarya; Mridula	Nominated	Not eligible			
Mridula	Rakesh; Noby	Aiswarya; Jaseela	Not eligible	Nominated	Not eligible	Noby (to evict)	Rahul; Anjali	Shijin; Rahul	Sreeraj; Santhosh	Nominated	Not eligible			
Neha	Aiswarya; Shijin	Aiswarya; Jaseela	Aiswarya	Nominated	Sreeraj; Shijin	Vipin (to evict)	Vedangi; Rahul	Shijin; Vedangi	Sreeraj; Anjali	Nominated	Not eligible			
Noby	Dhanya; Eldho	Sumesh; Aiswarya	Not eligible	Nominated	Rahul; Aiswarya	Mridula (to save)	Vipin; Gautham	Anjali; Nowfina	Nowfina; Santhosh	Nominated	Not eligible			
Rahul	Rini; Dhanya	Aiswarya; Shijin	Not eligible	Nominated	Shijin; Sreeraj	Anjali (to evict)	Shijin; Vipin	Shijin; Anjali	Vipin; Mridula	Nominated	Not eligible			
Shijin	Neha; Vignesh	Noby; Rahul	Sreeraj	Not eligible	Rahul; Aiswarya	Aiswarya (to evict)	Rahul; Noby	Rahul; Vedangi	Aiswarya; Nowfina	Nominated	Not eligible			
Sreeraj	Dhanya; Sreelakshmi	Sreelakshmi; Loletta	Gayathri	Nominated	Vignesh; Noby	Not eligible	Rahul; Noby	Vedangi; Rahul	Nowfina; Mridula	Nominated	Not eligible			
Vipin	Not In House			Entered (Day 28)	Azif	Neha (to evict)	Noby; Rahul	Vedangi; Rahul	Gautham; Santhosh	Nominated	Not eligible			
Vignesh	Shijin; Rini	Sreelaya; Sreeraj	Shibina	Nominated	Shijin; Aiswarya	Azif (to evict)	Aiswarya; Rahul	Sreeraj; Rahul	Anjali	Nominated	Nominated	Evicted (Day 77)		
Santhosh	Entered (Day 7)	Aiswarya; Anjali	Not eligible	Nominated	Shijin; Vignesh	Nominated	Vignesh; Rahul	Vedangi; Vipin	Vipin; Mridula	Nominated	Nominated	Evicted (Day 76)		
Anjali	Rahul; Rini	Sreelakshmi; Loletta	Gautham	Nominated	Not eligible	Rahul (to evict)	Vedangi; Nowfina	Mridula; Shijin	Nowfina; Sreeraj	Nominated	Evicted (Day 70)			
Nowfina	Not In House				Entered (Day 36)	Vipin (to save); Nilina (to evict)	Vedangi; Anjali	Shijin; Anjali	Sreeraj; Aiswarya	Evicted (Day 63)				
Vedangi	Not In House			Entered (Day 28)	Gautham	Nilina (to save)	Nowfina; Neha	Rahul; Anjali	Evicted (Day 56)					
Nilina	Not In House			Entered (Day 28)	Santhosh	Vedangi (to evict)	Evicted (Day 42)							
Eldho	Rini; Shijin	Aiswarya; Anjali	Not eligible	Nominated	Rahul; Vignesh	Evicted (Day 35)								
Suvarna	Not In House			Entered (Day 28)	Eldho	Walked (Day 30)								
Sreelakshmi	Sreeraj; Eldho	Aiswarya; Anjali	Not eligible	Nominated	Evicted (Day 27)									
Jaseela	Rini; Noby	Aiswarya; Neha	Not eligible	Nominated	Evicted (Day 27)									
Sumesh	Azif; Gautham	Noby; Sreeraj	Not eligible	Nominated	Evicted (Day 27)									
Gayathri	Rini; Sreelaya	Entered (Day 9)	Not eligible	Nominated	Evicted (Day 27)									
Loletta	Shijin; Rahul	Noby; Anjali	Jaseela	Nominated	Evicted (Day 27)									
Rakesh	Gayathri; Rini	Anjali; Aiswarya	Not eligible	Nominated	Evicted (Day 27)									
Shibina	Entered (Day 7)	Aiswarya; Anjali	Sumesh	Evicted (Day 21)										
Sreelaya	Dhanya; Rini	Aiswarya; Sreelakshmi	Evicted (Day 14)											
Rini	Rahul; Azif	Evicted (Day 7)												
Dhanya	Noby; Sreeraj	Evicted (Day 6)												
Notes	1, 2, 3, 4	5, 6, 7, 8	9, 10, 11, 12	13, 14, 15	16, 17, 18, 19, 20, 21, 22, 23, 24	25, 26, 27	28, 29, 30, 31, 32	33, 34, 35, 36	37	38, 39, 40, 41, 42	43, 44, 45, 46			
Against public vote	Azif; Dhanya; Eldho; Neha; Noby; Rahul; Rini; Shijin; Sreeraj	Aiswarya; Anjali; Jaseela; Loletta; Neha; Noby; Sreelakshmi; Sreelaya; Sreeraj; Sumesh	Aiswarya; Gautham; Gayathri; Jaseela; Mridula; Rakesh; Shibina; Sreeraj; Sumesh; Shijin	Aiswarya; Anjali; Azif; Eldho; Gautham; Gayathri; Jaseela; Loletta; Mridula; Neha; Noby; Rahul; Rakesh; Santhosh; Sreelakshmi; Sreeraj; Sumesh; Vignesh	Aiswarya; Azif; Eldho; Gautham; Rahul; Santhosh; Shijin; Sreeraj; Vignesh	Aiswarya; Anjali; Azif; Neha; Nilina; Noby; Rahul; Santhosh; Shijin; Vedangi	Aiswarya; Anjali; Noby; Nowfina; Rahul; Santhosh; Vedangi; Vignesh; Vipin	Anjali; Mridula; Noby; Rahul; Santhosh; Shijin; Vedangi	Aiswarya; Anjali; Mridula; Noby; Nowfina; Santhosh; Sreeraj; Vipin	Aiswarya; Anjali; Azif; Gautham; Mridula; Neha; Noby; Rahul; Santhosh; Shijin; Sreeraj; Vignesh; Vipin	Azif; Santhosh; Vignesh			
Walked	None				Suvarna	None								
Secret Room	None			Anjali; Mridula	None									
Re-entered		Gayathri	None											
Evicted	Rini	Sreelaya	Shibina	Sreelakshmi	Eldho	Nilina	No; Eviction	Vedangi	Nowfina	Anjali	Santhosh			
Evicted	Rini	Sreelaya	Shibina	Jaseela	Eldho	Nilina	No; Eviction	Vedangi	Nowfina	Anjali	Santhosh			
Evicted	Dhanya	Sreelaya	Shibina	Sumesh	Eldho	Nilina	No; Eviction	Vedangi	Nowfina	Anjali	Santhosh			
Evicted	Dhanya	Sreelaya	Shibina	Gayathri	Eldho	Nilina	No; Eviction	Vedangi	Nowfina	Anjali	Vignesh			
Evicted	Gayathri	Sreelaya	Shibina	Loletta	Eldho	Nilina	No; Eviction	Vedangi	Nowfina	Anjali	Vignesh			
Evicted	Gayathri	Sreelaya	Shibina	Rakesh	Eldho	Nilina	No; Eviction	Vedangi	Nowfina	Anjali	Vignesh			

=== Notes ===
indicates the House Leader.
indicates the supporter of House Leader.
indicates the Nominees for house leader.
indicates that the Housemate was directly nominated for eviction prior to the regular nominations process.
indicates that the Housemate was granted immunity from nominations.
Indicates the contestant as the Jail Inmate of the Week.
indicates the contestant has re-entered the house.
indicates that the Housemate was in the Secret Room for violating Bigg Boss rules.
indicates a new wildcard contestant.
indicates the Eviction free pass has been used on a housemate.
indicates the contestant has been walked out of the show.
indicates the contestant has been evicted.
indicates ticket to finale winner.
indicates the winner.
indicates the first runner up.
indicates the second runner up.
indicates the third runner up.
indicates the fourth runner up.

- ^Note 1 : Day 1: This season, instead of a House Captain, there will be a House Leader and supporters, all of whom will have immunity from eviction and hold power in the house.
- ^Note 2 : Day 1: Bigg Boss asked housemates to discuss each other of the weekly nomination for the first time in BB Malayalam history
- ^Note 3 : Day 2: Gayathri Suresh was evicted from the house by the decision of House Leader Jaseela
- ^Note 4 : Day 7: Shibina & Santhosh entered as wild card contestants and will play as one player.
- ^Note 5 : Day 8: Eldho surrendered the leadership to bring back Gayathri, and Rahul became the new House Leader.
- ^Note 6 : Day 9: Gayathri Suresh re-entered the house.
- ^Note 7 : Day 11: Bigg Boss asked the house leader to nominate three housemates for the eviction process based on their performance in the weekly task. The leader chose Rakesh, Shijin, and Mridula for week 3 nomination.
- ^Note 8 : Day 14: Host Mohanlal announced that Shibina and Santhosh will play as individual players from now on.
- ^Note 9 : Day 15: Only contestants who qualify through this week's nomination task can nominate, and each can nominate only one contestant.
- ^Note 10 : Day 17: Bigg Boss announced that the weekly task was terminated due to its increasing intensity and physical issues among the contestants.
- ^Note 11 : Day 20: During the weekend episode, host Mohanlal removed the current House Leader from the position. He further announced that there would be no House Leader for the following week.
- ^Note 12 : Day 20: Due to the unfortunate events that occurred during the current week, Mohanlal announced that all housemates would be nominated for eviction in Week 4.
- ^Note 13 : Day 22: Bigg Boss announced there would be a leadership task this week, and the leader would be nomination free.
- ^Note 14 : Day 27: Due to an overseas film shoot, Mohanlal did not appear in the weekend episode of Bigg Boss.
- ^Note 15 : Day 27: For the first time in Bigg Boss history, six housemates were evicted in a mass eviction.
- ^Note 16 : Day 29: Bigg Boss announced that the house would be ruled by the wildcard entries for the week.
- ^Note 17 : Day 29: Bigg Boss asked each wildcard contestant to choose one housemate for direct nomination.
- ^Note 18 : Day 30: Suvarna expressed her desire to leave the Bigg Boss house, citing mental exhaustion and difficulty participating in the game.
- ^Note 19 : Day 32: Anjali and Mridula were moved back into the house from the secret room.
- ^Note 20 : Day 32: After receiving the lowest points in the weekly task, Azif and Vignesh were directly nominated for the eviction process of week 6.
- ^Note 21 : Day 32: After winning the weekly task, Rahul Easwar chose to bring back one evicted housemate, Rakesh.
- ^Note 22 : Day 32: After successfully completing the secret task assigned by Bigg Boss to the wildcards, which involved supplying food to the contestants in the secret room, they earned a special power that will be revealed by Bigg Boss later.
- ^Note 23 : Day 34: Due to the housemates' poor performance in the task, Mohanlal announced that the weekly task had been cancelled. As a result, no evicted housemate would return to the house as a reward, and the luxury budget was also cancelled.
- ^Note 24 : Day 34: Due to his misconduct in the house, Mohanlal announced that Santhosh would be nominated for eviction for the next three weeks.
- ^Note 25 : Day 36: Nowfina was given a special power to save one housemate from the nominations and nominate another housemate in their place.
- ^Note 26 : Day 39: After best performance in the weekly task, Mridula was directly nominated for next week's House Leader task.
- ^Note 27 : Day 40:The wildcards requested to use the special power they received on Day 32 for the jail nomination task.
- ^Note 28 : Day 45: Santhosh was taken to the hospital for further medical evaluation and returned to the house on the same day.
- ^Note 29 : Day 48: Due to his misconduct in the house, Mohanlal announced that Nobi would be nominated for eviction for the next three weeks.
- ^Note 30 : Day 49: Mohanlal announced that there would be a female House Leader in Week 8 as well and asked the current House Leader to select three contestants for the position.
- ^Note 31 : Day 49: Mohanlal granted Vipin eviction-free pass, which will remain valid until Week 10.
- ^Note 32 : Day 49: Mohanlal announced that there would be no eviction due to the 50th day celebration.
- ^Note 33 : Day 50: Rahul Easwar won the Ticket to Week 12 task and secured immunity until Week 12.
- ^Note 34 : Day 50: After the Ticket to Week 12 task, Bigg Boss announced that the winner's prize money would be ₹25,00,000.05.
- ^Note 35 : Day 53: Azif was taken to the hospital for further medical evaluation after an injury during a task and returned to the house on the same day.
- ^Note 36 : Day 53: Bigg Boss announced that Neha, Noby and Santhosh would be ineligible to become house leader for the remainder of the season following the weekly task.
- ^Note 37 : Day 60: Although Bigg Boss had earlier announced that Neha, Noby and Santhosh were ineligible to become House Leader for the rest of the season, Neha was later allowed to become House Leader after winning this week's task.
- ^Note 38 : Day 64: Bigg Boss found that Anjali, Noby and Santhosh had violated the house rules by discussing nominations and making plans with other housemates. As a consequence, Bigg Boss nominated all housemates, including the House Leader and the Ticket to Week 12 winner, for eviction this week.
- ^Note 39 : Day 65: Although the task concluded late that night, Ga Cha continued to stay in the house as a guest for the remainder of the week.
- ^Note 40 : Day 68: Following the Legacy Week tasks, the final prize money increased to ₹29,00,000.05.
- ^Note 41 : Day 69: Host Mohanlal issued a final warning to Noby after showing him a yellow card for discussing nominations.
- ^Note 42 : Day 69: Following the physical altercation during an argument the previous week, Mohanlal announced that only Azif, Santhosh and Vignesh would be part of the eviction process, and that the regular nomination process would not take place the following week.
- ^Note 43 : Day 74: Bigg Boss announced that the weekly task 'Bluff Master' had been terminated because contestant Neha had seriously violated the rules.
- ^Note 44 : Day 74: The weekly task was terminated due to a violation of the task rules, resulting in the cancellation of this week's luxury budget.
- ^Note 45 : Day 74: The weekly task 'Bluff Master' was restarted, with contestant Neha excluded from further participation due to her violation of the task rules.
- ^Note 46 : Day 76: Due to a violation of the weekly task rules, Mohanlal announced that Neha would have to serve a jail sentence when Bigg Boss makes the announcement next week.

== Release ==
Latest seasons of Malayalam , Tamil, Telugu, Kannada and Hindi editions of Bigg Boss premiered simultaneously on 6 September 2026. Ahead of the premiere, a promotional video featuring the hosts of all four South Indian editions— Mohanlal, Vijay Sethupathi, Nagarjuna and Kichcha Sudeepa was released.
