= Vanambadi (TV series) =

2017 Indian musical television series

- Genre: Musical; Drama; Family drama
- Created by: M.Renjith
- Developed by: M.Renjith
- Written by: J. Pallassery
- Directed by: Adithyan
- Starring: Sai Kiran; Chippy Renjith; Gauri P. Krishnan
- Opening theme: "Muthamittu Muthamittu Thaa"
- Ending theme: "Njan Oru Vanambadi"
- Composers: M. Jayachandran; Harinarayanan (lyrics); Saanand George Grace (Bgm)
- Country of origin: India
- Original language: Malayalam
- No. of seasons: 7
- No. of episodes: 1013

Production
- Producer: Chippy Renjith
- Cinematography: Anurag Guna; Vimal Krishna; Alex U. Thomas
- Editor: Pradeep Bhagvath
- Camera setup: Multiple-camera setup
- Running time: 25 - 40 minutes
- Production companies: Rejaputhra Visual Media; Avanthika Creations (banner)

Original release
- Network: Asianet
- Release: 30 January 2017 – 18 September 2020

Vanambadi വാനമ്പാടി (transl. Nightingale) is an Indian musical television series. The show premiered first on 30 January 2017 on Asianet channel and streaming on Disney+ Hotstar and last episode aired on 18 September 2020. The show features Sai Kiran, Chippy Renjith, Gouri P Krishnan and others. It marks the debut of Telugu actor Sai Kiran in the Malayalam industry. It is the official remake of the Bengali language series Potol Kumar Gaanwala. It is one of the longest-ran soap opera in Malayalam.

== Synopsis ==
Mohan Kumar, a budding singer falls in love with Nandini, a normal village girl. They get secretly married. However, Mohan is forced to choose between music and Nandini. He chooses the former and abandons Nandini. Mohan marries a wealthy woman named Padmini "Puppy" Menon, unaware that Nandini is pregnant.

Padmini gives birth to Thampuru, and Nandini gives birth to Anugraha "Anu". Thampuru is a spoilt brat. While Anugraha, just like her father, loves music. Nandini lives with her brother Nandu and sister in law Bhadra who dislike her. Eventually, Anu is seen to be a great fan of Mohan and goes to meet him. Nandini, gets hit by a car and is hospitalized. Anu collects money for her mother's treatment only to be devastated to know that Nandini has died.

Anu wanders off alone, dressed up as a boy, where she reaches Mohan's home where Every members, except Padmini, Thampuru and her parents becomes fond of Anu by her musical talent. Mohan's brother Chandran and his wife Nirmala decides to adopt Anu. Padmini gets to know about Anu's true identity and reveals it to all. Meanwhile, Bhadra realises her mistakes and enters Sreemangalam house as a housemaid named Kalyani, Anu recognises her. Kalyani (Bhadra) too starts supporting Anu.

The rest of the story hurdles about Anu's life in that house. Including, the friend-foe relationship between Anu and Thampuru. Mohan and Anu starts to get closer where Mohan realise that Anu is his daughter. Thampuru discovers that Anu is her half sister. Anu and Thampuru get even more closer.

However, the series ends, as Padmini realises her mistakes. Guilt-ridden, Padmini leaves the house after leaving a message, to Mohan and Thampuru and asks Anu for forgiveness. Mohan, Thampuru and Anu are much worried about her, as they wait in a hope that she will return.

== Cast ==
- Sai Kiran as Mohankumar / Mohanakrishnan
- Chippy Renjith as Nandini Mohankumar, Anumol's mother
- Gauri P Krishnan as Anugraha Mohankumar/Anumol/Anumon/Gouri
- Suchithra Nair as Padmini "Puppy" Mohankumar
- Jelina P as Thampuru Mohankumar & Aiswarya Maheendran (dual role)
- Balu Menon as Chandrakumar / Chandrasekharan / Chandran
- Uma Nair as Nirmala "Nimmy" Chandran
- Mohan Ayroor as Meledath Viswanathan Menon, Padmini's father
- Pria Menon as Rukmini Viswanathan, Padmini's mother
- Indira Thampi as Sreemangalath Devakiyamma, Mohan and Chandran's mother
- Rajkumar as DYSP Jayaraj / Jayan, Padmini's uncle
- Seema G. Nair as Bhadra / Kalyani, Anumol's aunt
- Saji Surya as Driver Sudevan
- Nandu Poduval as Nandagopan / Nandan / Nandu Maman, Anumol's uncle
- Rajeev Parameshwar as Maheendran / Mahi, Thamburu's real father
- Anusree Chembakassery as Archana Maheendran / Achu
- Binny George as Aleena
- Bincy Joseph as Karthika
- Divya Jayish Nair as Nandini (governess)
- Manu Varma as Doctor GK, Mohan's friend
- Indulekha as Devi Teacher
- J. Pallassery as Kalappurakkal Madhavan, Nirmala's father
- Girija Preman as Yashodhamma, Nirmala's mother
- Deepika Mohan as Maheswariyamma, Maheendran's mother
- Vipin James as Pramod Krishnan
- Ravikrishnan Gopalakrishnan as Simon
- Santhosh Keshavan as Vijayanandan
- Hareendran as Vinod
- Yathikumar as Ananthan / Anantha Moorthi
- Kailas Nath as Vasudevan / Vasu Annan, Menon's Karyasthan
- J Padmanabhan Thampi as Venugopalan Thampi / Thampi Annan, Temple Committee President
- Kottayam Rasheed as Mamachan, mechanic
- Anand Thrissur as Suresh
- Raghavan as Devan (Anumol's Swami Muthashan)
- Geetha Nair as Lakshmi Devan
- Sharika Menon as Priya Suresh
- Neeraja as Neeraja, Nirmala's sister
- Biji Raj as Satheeshan, Neeraja's husband
- Baby Megha Mahesh as Neeraja's and Satheeshan's daughter
- F.J. Tharakan as Jacob Tharakan
- Rajmohan as SI Rajmohan
- Sindhu Varma as Mamachan's wife
- Sreekala as Karthiyayani
- Kaladharan as Swami
- Amboori Jayan as Jayanthan
- Thirumala Ramachandran as Balan
- Kuttyedathi Vilasini
- Manu Gopinathan as Balu
- Sachin SG as Sumesh
- Achu Sugandh as Pappikunju
- Nariyapuram Venu

== Soundtrack ==
All lyrics are written by B. K. Harinarayanan; all music is composed by M. Jayachandran.

Original Songs
| No. | Title | Singer(s) | Length |
|---|---|---|---|
| 1. | "Palanalay Thirumunnil" | Varsha Renjith | 2:50 |
| 2. | "Neeyen Ganam" | Varsha Renjith | 3:30 |
| 3. | "Chenkadali Koombinnullil" | Mridula Warrier, Shreya Jayadeep | 1:33 |
| 4. | "Mathileri Kunnile" | | 2:27 |
| 5. | "Devi Manamuruki" | | 1:30 |
| 6. | "Devi Saraswathi Maye" | M. Jayachandran | 3:06 |
| 7. | "Poovalipayye Poovalipayye" | Shreya Jayadeep | 1:54 |
| 8. | "Njanoru Vanambadi" | Shreya Jayadeep, M. Jayachandran | 2:34 |
| 9. | "Shishiravennila Veendume" | M. Jayachandran | 2:23 |
| 10. | "Kannillenkilum Kazhchakanan" | Varsha Renjith | 2:43 |
| 11. | "Swaramazhayil Manammayangum" | Varsha Renjith | 3:09 |
| 12. | "Ammapakshi" | M. Jayachandran |

== Adaptations ==
| Language | Title | Original release | Network(s) | Last aired | Notes |
|---|---|---|---|---|---|
| Bengali | Potol Kumar Gaanwala পটল কুমার গানওয়ালা | 14 December 2015 | Star Jalsha | 10 September 2017 | Original |
| Malayalam | Vanambadi വാനമ്പാടി | 30 January 2017 | Asianet | 18 September 2020 | Remake |
| Tamil | Mouna Raagam மௌன ராகம் | 24 April 2017 | Star Vijay | 17 March 2023 | Remake |
| Hindi | Kullfi Kumarr Bajewala कुल्फ़ी कुमार बाजेवाला | 19 March 2018 | StarPlus | 7 February 2020 | Remake |
| Marathi | Tuzech Mi Geet Gaat Aahe तुझेच मी गीत गात आहे | 2 May 2022 | Star Pravah | 16 June 2024 | Remake |
| Kannada | Namma Lacchi ನಮ್ಮ ಲಚ್ಚಿ | 6 February 2023 | Star Suvarna | 6 April 2024 | Remake |
