= Geeta Govindam =

Indian Malayalam-language soap opera

- Genre: Drama, Romance, Thriller
- Screenplay by: N Vinu Narayanan, George Kattappana
- Starring: Sajan Surya; Binny Sebastian
- Music by: Sanand George
- Country of origin: India
- Original language: Malayalam
- No. of episodes: 709

Production
- Producer: Bhadra Boby
- Cinematography: Krishna Kodanadu
- Editor: Roshan S.
- Camera setup: Multi-camera
- Running time: 22 minutes

Original release
- Network: Asianet; JioHotstar
- Release: 13 February 2023 – 4 July 2025

Geetha Govindam is an Indian Malayalam-language romantic drama soap opera. The show aired from 13 February 2023 to 4 July 2025 on Asianet and streams on JioHotstar in India. It stars Sajan Surya and Binny Sebastian in lead roles along with Ambika, Amrutha Nair, Giridhar, Deva, Revathi Nair, Bindhu Pankaj and Uma Nair in pivotal roles. The title of the series is adapted from the 2018 Telugu film of the same name.

== Synopsis ==
A middle-aged businessman Govind, falls in love with Geethanjali, a young girl. Their unusual love story takes a hit when his past overshadows his present.

== Cast ==
=== Main ===
- Sajan Surya as Arakkal Govind Madhav (AGM): Geethu's husband, Radhika's stepson, Varun's step-brother and Priya's half brother. Son of Vijayalakshmi and Arakkal Madhavan. Chairman and CEO of AGM group of companies.
- Dr. Binny Sebastian
  - Geethanjali a.k.a Geethu: Govind's wife, Kishor's ex, Vinod's sister, Bhadran and Vilasini's daughter.
  - Margazhi (Ganga): Geethu's twin elder sister

=== Recurring ===
- Swetha Venkat (episode 1 to 508)/ Premi Venkat(episode 509 to 611)/Bindhu Pankaj (episode 612 to 709) as Radhika aka Radhikamma: Priya and Varun's mother, Govind's stepmother, Arakkal Madhavan's mistress.
- Amrutha Nair as Rekha. Varun's wife.
- Ambika as Vijayalakshmi subramaniam, Arakkal Madhavan's ex-wife, Govind's mother and Shivaranjini's foster mother. Renowned singer.
- Giridhar as Ajas. Govind's right hand and Geethu's bodyguard.
- Aju Thomas(2023)/ Deva Prasad as Varun. Radhika's son. Priya's half brother. Govind's step brother. Rekha's husband. Suvarna's boyfriend.
- Revathi Nair as Priya: Radhika and Madhavan's daughter, Vinod's wife, Govind and Varun's half sister
- Mithun Sayanth (2023)/Deva Dev (2023-2024)/Ashwin Jith as Vinod: Bhadran and Vilasini's son, Priya's Husband, Geethu's brother.
- Anil K Sivaram as Ayyappan Nair. Works with Arakkal family and Govind's well wisher.
- Santhosh Kurup as Bhadran. Vilasini's husband, Geethu and Vinod's father. Govind's enemy.
- Uma Nair as Vilasini. Bhadran's wife. Geethu and Vinod's mother.
- Pratheeksha G Pradeep as Avarnika. Businesswoman. Kishor's ex-wife. Govind's business partner.
- Swetha Geetha as Shivaranjini (Renju), Vijayalakshmi's adopted daughter and Anarkali's biological daughter.
- Akin as Kishor. Geethu's ex-lover, Avarnika's husband.
- Joshnina M Tharakan as Kanchana, domestic help
- Rajkumar Rajasekhar as Raghuram. Avarnika's father and Govind's family friend.
- Athira Lakshman as Suvarna. Fake wife of Ajas, Varun's extramarital affair.
- Maya Vishwanath as Anarkali, Renju's biological mother (the antagonist)
- Vijayan V. Nair as Bhaskaran / Sathya Das (fake); Varun's biological father. (the main antagonist)
- Fawaz Zayani as Dhyan; Renju's husband
- Murali Mohan as Venki. Anarkali's husband, Vijayalekshmi's assistant, Renju's father
- Sanju Salim as CI
- Sindhu Suresh as Pavizham; Margazhi's foster mother

=== Guest ===
- Santhosh Keezhattoor as Arakkal Madhavan Nair. Govind, Priya's father. Varun's step-father. Radhika's baby-daddy. Vijayalakshmi's ex-husband.
- Asif Ali as himself
- Aju Varghese as Himself in Govind's marriage episode
- Shanthi Krishna as herself
- Athira Madhav as TV show anchor
- Saju Kodiyan as Ramakrishnan, Radhika's brother
- Veena Nair as Magistrate
- Kochunni Prakash as goon
- Padmakumar as Karan Naik; a goon assigned by varun to kill Geethu
- Nayana Josan
- Shrishwetha Mahalakshmi
- Apsara Ratnakaran
- Meera Vasudevan as Sumithra. (Reprising from Kudumbavilakku); businesswoman in profession.
- Noobin Johny as Pratheesh Menon. (Reprising from Kudumbavilakku); singer in profession.
- Dr. Shaju Sham as Rohith Gopal. (Reprising from Kudumbavilakku). Sumitra's husband
- Aishwarya Ramsai as Kalyani. (Reprising from Mounaragam)
- Naleef Gea as Kiran. (Reprising from Mounaragam)
- Sajin T. P. as Shivaramakrishnan Pillai. (Reprising from Santhwanam)
- Gopika Anil as Anjali(Reprising from Santhwanam) Shiva's wife

== Adaptations ==
Language	Title	Original release	Network(s)	Last aired	Notes
Malayalam	Geeta Govindam ഗീതാ ഗോവിന്ദം	13 February 2023	Asianet	4 July 2025	Original
Telugu	Yeto Vellipoyindi Manasu ఏటో వెళ్ళిపోయింది మనసు	22 January 2024	Star Maa	19 April 2025	Remake

== Reception ==
The show began airing from 13 February 2023 at 7.30 PM IST. In the launch week, the show secured fourth position in TRP ratings. From 17 June 2024, the show is shifted to 10.00 PM IST for launch of Santhwanam 2. From 7 April 2025, the show is shifted to 6.00 PM IST for launch of another TV series Teacheramma. From 21 April 2025, the show again shifted to 1.30 PM. From 26 May 2025, the show again shifted to 2.00pm for final episodes.The show is well known for the lead pair's romantic performance.
