= Pournamithinkal =

- Genre: Soap opera Drama
- Written by: Ganesh Olikkara
- Directed by: Ajay Narayan (episodes 1–68); Manoj (episodes 101–516)
- Creative director: Kannan Thamarakkulam
- Starring: See below
- Opening theme: "Karalil Kannadi Poovu" കരളിൽ കണ്ണാടി പൂവ്"
- Ending theme: "Ormakal nizhalukal" "ഓർമകൾ നിഴലുകൾ"
- Composer: Saanandh George
- Countries of origin: Kerala, India
- Original language: Malayalam
- No. of seasons: 2
- No. of episodes: 516

Production
- Executive producer: Sanjeev
- Producer: Chitra Shenoy
- Production location: Kerala
- Cinematography: Anurag Guna / Krishna Kumar / Prince
- Editor: Tony
- Camera setup: Multiple-camera setup
- Running time: 22 minutes
- Production company: Good Company Productions

Original release
- Network: Asianet
- Release: 29 April 2019 – 17 April 2021

Pournamithinkal is an Indian Malayalam-language television soap opera drama. The show premiered on Asianet and streams on Disney+ Hotstar. It was produced by Chitra Shenoy's Good Company Productions.

Chitra Shenoy, Gauri Krishnan, and Vishnu Nair play the lead roles and veteran actor Sai Kumar made his comeback to the mini screen after 14 years. The show went off air on 17 April 2021 due to poor ratings.

== Synopsis ==
=== Season-1 ===
Raghunandan and Rajalakshmi were lovers years back, but never married. They separated and married others. 25 years later they meet again. Both of them are leading their families. Raghundandan is a cancer patient and a father of Pournami. Rajalakshmi is married to Prathap Shankar, a wealthy businessman. Raghundandan asks Rajalakshmi to care for his daughter after his death and Rajalakshmi agrees. She brings Pournami to her home and decides that her son Premjith should marry her. Trouble flourish for both Rajalakshmi and Pournami. Later, Pournami and Prem Shankar became loving each other. But they have been haunted by Anie Punjakkadan, Prem's ex-love of interest. In this time, Rajalakshmi's twin sister Sethulakshmi who was raised by Rajalakshmi's parent's relatives enters Rajalakshmi's house to take revenge on her. But Sethulakshmi is arrested when she tries to kill Rajalakshmi. Months later, Pournami gave birth to a daughter, Kingini.

=== Season-2 ===
The story takes a two-year leap. Prem and Pournami live happily with her little daughter Kingini. But Anie returns to take revenge on them. Despite having an enemy, they face a new problem: Prem has memory loss.

== Cast ==
=== Main cast ===
- Ranjani Raghavan(2019)/Maneesha Jayasingh(2019)/Gowri Krishnan (August 2019 – 2021) as Pournami Premjith Shanker Lal(Premsankar's wife, Rajalakshmi and Prathap's daughter-in-law, Reghunandan's daughter, Kingini's mother)
- Chitra Shenoy (Dual role)
  - as Rajalakshmi Prathap Shanker Lal(Prem's mother, Prathap's wife, Pournami's mother-in-law, Vasantham's sister-in-law, Shwetha's aunt, Kingini's grandmother)
  - as Sethulakshmi(Rajalekshmi's twin sister)
- Vishnu V Nair as Premjith Shanker Lal(Pournami's husband, Prathap and Rajalakshmi's son, Shwetha's cousin, Annie's ex-love of interest, Kingini's father)
- Mahesh (2019)/ Lishoy (2020-2021)
  - as Prathap Shankar Lal(Prem's father, Pournami's father-in-law, Rajalakshmi's husband, Vasantham's brother, Shwetha's uncle, Kingini's grandfather)
  - as Narrator (episode 516)
- Vinuja Vijay (2019)/Sneha Diwakar(2020)/ Apsara Ratnakaran (2020-2021) as Swetha(Prem's cousin, Vasanthamallika's daughter)
- Navami Gayak (2019)/ Lekshmi Pramod (2019-2020) and Lekshmi Priya(2020-2021) as Annie Punjakkadan(Prem's ex-love of interest, Punchakkadan Paulose's daughter)
- Baby Annakutty as Kingini(Daughter of Prem and Pournami, granddaughter of Shankar, Rajalekshmi and Reghunandan)

=== Recurring cast ===
- Kanya Bharathi / Devi Chandana as Vasanthamallika(Prathap's sister, Shwetha's mother, Prem's aunt)
- Sharan Puthumana (Harishanth) as Nandan(Prem and Annie's friend)
- Ravikrishnan Gopalakrishnan as Poulose(Annie's father, Prathap's ex-colleague)
- Shemi Martin as Deepa(Pournami and Anand's friend, Prem's colleague)
- Fazil Rihan as Anand(Pournami's childhood friend, Deepa and Prem's colleague and wishes to marry Pournami)
- Sini Varghese as Adv.Rani Thomas Kuruvila
- Anoop Sivasenan as Adv.Thomas Kuruvila
- Munshi Ranjith as Shatrughan a.k.a. Shatru(Sethulakshmi's Step Brother)
- Jolly Easow as Kanaka(Vasanthamallika's mother, Shwetha's grandma)
- Wafa Aster as Sivaja(Rajalakshmi and Prathap's daughter, Prem's sister, Mohan's wife)
- Sai Kumar as Raghunandan(Pournami's father and Rajalakshmi's childhood friend)
- Rishi as Rudran(Pournami's cousin who wished to marry Pournami)
- Cherthala Lalitha as Rudran's mother(Pournami's aunt, Rudran's mother and Raghunandan's sister)
- Faizal as Mohan(Sivaja's husband)
- Saritha Balakrishnan as Kingini's caretaker
- Payyanur Murali
- Gomathi Mahadevan
- Jose Peroorkada
- Meera Vasudevan as Sumithra (Cameo)
- Krishnakumar Menon as Sidharth (Cameo)
- Sajan Palluruthy as Watchman (Cameo)

== Production ==
The serial remarks the comeback of actress Chitra Shenoy after the serial Sthreedhanam. Popular Kannada serial actress Ranjani Raghavan made her debutante heroine lead role in Malayalam after Kannada TV series Puttugowri Maduve in Colors Kannada, however she quit the show shortly after due to date clashes. Sai Kumar, Malayalam film actor made a cameo role in the first few episodes. Chitra Shenoy carried out the production of the series.
