= Kanmani (album) =

Kanmani Album Cover

Kanmani is a Malayalam music album that was released in the Indian State of Kerala and the United States. The album features lead Malayalam singers such as Madhu Balakrishnan, Vidhu Prathap, Manjari, Franco, Unni Menon, and Jassie Gift. It also includes the talents of flautist Prasad Bhandarkar, a pupil of maestro Hariprasad Chaurasia, and violinist Anuradha Sridhar, the niece of violin maestro Lalgudi Jayaraman.

The songs have a strong melody base with simple yet powerful lyrics. The music album is complemented by the visualizations to the songs. Kanmani stands out as a phenomenon that was mostly marketed via the web. It is one of the first Malayalam albums to tap into the power of video sharing sites like YouTube and social networks like orkut.
