= Balaganapathy =

- Genre: Drama; Fantasy; Mythology
- Directed by: Harison
- Music by: S.P. Venkatesh
- Country of origin: India
- Original language: Malayalam
- No. of seasons: 1
- No. of episodes: 307

Production
- Producer: G S SUDHEER
- Production location: Kerala
- Editor: Shafeek
- Running time: approx. 20-22 minutes per episode

Original release
- Network: Asianet
- Release: 31 March 2014 – 5 June 2015

Related
- Bala Ganapathy

Balaganapathy is a Malayalam soap opera that premiered on Asianet. The first episode aired on 31 March 2014. It was relaunched on Asianet Plus in late 2016. The show was also remade into Tamil under the same title on Star Vijay from 14 September 2015 to 18 December 2015 for 65 episodes.

== Plot ==
Balaganapathy tele serial tells the story of Ram, a ten-year-old child and his devotion to Lord Ganesha. Ram believes blindly in the powers of almighty and he learned about Lord Ganesha through the stories told by grandmother. Pooja is his best friend, who stays with him throughout his failures and gives him confidence. Their class teacher Sunitha is compassionate to Ram and wants to see him succeed in life. However, he fails to succeed in many of the tasks presented to him. In the story's turning point, Lord Ganesh himself takes the avatar of Balagnapathy to accompany Ram and his friends to overcome all difficulties in his life.

== Cast ==
=== Main ===
- Bishwas Chinmaya as Balaganapathy / Lord Ganesha/Vishnu
- Siddharth Ajithkumar as Ram Gopal Varma
- Niranjana as Pooja Manohar
- Sibin Sakaria as Thadiayan / Rohit
- Adityan as Motta / Sunder
- Dileep Shankar as Gopal Varma / Gopalan (Ram's father)
- Souparnika Vijay as Sunitha Teacher (Ram's teacher)
- Sajitha Betti as Radhika Varma

=== Supporting ===
- Priya Mohan as Sunanda (Kunjappu's daughter)
- Kollam Thulasi as Kunjappu
- Poojappura Radhakrishnan as Kaimal (Radhika's father)
- Ambika Mohan as Aayamma
- G S Sudheer as Advocate Vikraman
- Mahesh as ACP Manohar (Pooja's father)
- Geetha Nair as Remaniamma (Sunitha's mother)
- Sethu Lakshmi as Kichammayi
- Azeez as Milkman Supran
- Harikumaran Thampi as Ram's school principal
- Kalyan Khanna

== Awards ==
Won-Asianet Television awards 2015

- Best Character actor (Special Jury) -Mahesh

Won- Asianet Television awards 2014

- Best Child Artist-Bishwas Chinmaya Nayak, Sidharth, Sebin, Niranjana, Adityan.
- Best director

Nominated-Asianet Television awards 2015

- Best Character Actor- Dileep Sankar
- Best actress in a negative role-Sajitha Betti

== Reboot ==
A spiritual reboot of the show titled Bala Hanuman was aired on Asianet from 19 April to 30 October 2021 for 151 episodes. The show is about invisible Lord Hanuman appears in front of three little friends and knows their sorrows.The show stars child actors Darsh, Gyan Dev, Pinky and Arjun in lead characters.
