= Kana Kanmani (2016 TV series) =

- Genre: Drama Thriller
- Written by: S.V.Roopesh
- Directed by: Ratheesh Bhargav
- Starring: See below
- Country of origin: India
- Original language: Malayalam
- No. of seasons: 1
- No. of episodes: 99

Production
- Producer: Thilok Chand Kothari
- Production location: Thiruvananthapuram Kerala
- Production company: Thrisha Media Productions

Original release
- Network: Asianet
- Release: 11 April – 26 August 2016

Related
- Kalyana Sougandhikam; Chinthavishtayaya Seetha

Kana Kanmani (കാണാ കണ്മണി) is a 2016 Indian television series airing on Asianet from 11 April 2016 to 26 August 2016. The series ended following its 99th episode. It is the story of Jayanthan Menon and his daughter Manasa.

Gowri Krishna and Dilsha Prasannan won the Best Debut award at the Asianet Television Awards 2016 marking their debut in Malayalam television along with South Indian television actor Sanjay Asrani.

== Plot ==
The family drama starts with Jayanthan Menon's assistant Kaimal meets Chitra (Jayanthan's wife) conveying his wish to meet his daughter Manasa before he dies. However Manasa and Chitra convey their hatred towards him as they were separated years ago because of misunderstandings and allegations. But her best friend Krishnendu appears in front of him as his daughter, Manasa and he recovered from his illness miraculously. At last Jayanthan Menon reunited with his wife Chitra and real Manasa after clearing misunderstandings and allegations.

== Recognition ==
Asianet TV awards 2016:

- Best debut – Gouri and Dilsha (nominated)
- Best Script
- Best Audiography
- Best Director
- Best editor

== Cast ==
- Gowri Krishnan as Krishnendu
- Dilsha Prasannan as Manasa
- Sanjay Kumar (Sanjay Asrani) / Risabawa as Jayanthan Menon
- Balaji Sharma as Jayaprakash Menon
- Anila Sreekumar as Thoolika Teacher
- Vijayakumari as Maheshwari
- Shivadas as Kaimal
- Arun G Raghavan as Giri
- Sarath Swamy as Sidharth
- Binny George as Mekha
- Anand Narayan as Ragesh
- Venu as Mukundan Menon
- Mithun as Manu
- Geetha as Chitra
- Arya Rohit as Sarayu
- Uma Devi Nair as Devayani
- Manka Mahesh as Muttashi
