= Jeevitha (disambiguation) =

== People (given name) ==
- Jeevitha is an Indian actress concentrating on Tamil and Telugu languages of Indian film industry.
- Jeevitha Panippan, victim of a murder case in Singapore

== Films ==
- Jeevitham (1950 film), (Telugu: జీవితం; English: Life) is a 1950 Black-and-white Telugu social guidance film produced and directed by A. V. Meiyappan with his company AVM Productions.
- Jeevitha Nouka, (English: The Boat of Life) is a 1951 Malayalam film directed by K. Vembu and jointly produced by K. V. Koshi and Kunchako.
- Jeevitham (1984 film) is a 1984 Indian Malayalam film, directed by K. Vijayan and produced by K. Balaji.
- Jeevitha Chakram (transl. Life Cycle) is a 1971 Telugu-language drama film, produced by P. Gangadhar Rao under the Nava Shakthi Productions banner and directed by C. S. Rao.
- Jeevithe Lassanai, (Life is Beautiful) (ජීවිතේ ලස්සනයි) is a 2012 Sri Lankan Sinhala comedy film directed by Sudesh Wasantha Peris and produced by Sunil T Fernando for Sunil T Films.
- Jeevitham Oru Gaanam is a 1979 Indian Malayalam film, directed by Sreekumaran Thampi.

== TV series ==
- Jeevitha Nouka (TV series), (English: The Boat of Life) is an Indian Malayalam television series being premiered on Mazhavil Manorama since 23 March 2020.
