= Bhavana (TV series) =

Indian Malayalam television soap opera

- Also known as: Bhavana- The Story of a Survivor
- Genre: Soap opera Family; Drama
- Based on: Kayal by P. Selvam
- Written by: M. C. Ratheesh
- Screenplay by: M. C. Ratheesh
- Directed by: Sunil Karyattukara
- Starring: Stephy Leon; Rayjan Rajan
- Voices of: Devayani; Shankar Lal
- Opening theme: "Oru Kadha Puthu Kadha" by Sithara Krishnakumar
- Country of origin: India
- Original language: Malayalam
- No. of seasons: 1
- No. of episodes: 1078

Production
- Executive producer: Ravi Prasad
- Camera setup: Multi-camera
- Running time: 20-25 minutes
- Production company: Cyabio fims

Original release
- Network: Sun Surya; Sun NXT
- Release: 26 June 2022 – 29 June 2025

Related
- Saadhana; Radhika; Kayal; Majhi Manasa

Bhavana is an Indian Malayalam-language soap opera. The show aired from 26 June 2022 to 29 June 2025 on Sun Surya. It stars Stephy Leon in the title role along with Rayjan Rajan and Rekha Ratheesh in pivotal roles. It aired on Sun Surya and on-demand through Sun NXT. It is an official remake of Tamil soap opera Kayal.

== Synopsis ==
Abandoned by her father and coping with an alcoholic brother, Bhavana is her family's sole provider as a nurse. She finds happiness in her sacrifice to meet the needs of her brother and sisters.

== Cast ==
=== Main ===
- Stephy Leon as Bhavana:
  - The second eldest of five siblings. She is a head nurse and is the sole breadwinner of the family. (Main Protagonist)
- Rayjan Rajan as Surya Dev:
  - Bhavana's best friend who secretly loves her. He is an amateur boxer and a successful businessman. (Main Protagonist)

=== Recurring ===
- Shobi Thilakan as Vijaya padman: Bhavana's paternal uncle (Main Antagonist)
- Rekha Ratheesh as Gayathri: Bhavana's mother
- Kiran Aravindakshan as Sethumadhavan alias Sethu: Bhavana's drunkard elder brother
- Pinky Kannan as Maya: Sethumadhavan's wife
- Baby Anandritha Manu as Nandana: Sethumadhavan and Maya's daughter
- Anjana Mohan as Bhama: Bhavana's younger sister; Abhiram's wife.
- Kalyan Khanna as Abhiram alias Ram: Bhama's husband
- Subeer Bavu as Bharath: Bhavana's younger brother
- Meera Mahesh as Bhanupriya alias Bhanu: Bhavana's youngest sister
- Sethu Lakshmi as Muthashi: Bhavana's paternal grandmother
- Amal Rajdev as Suryadev's father
- Archana Menon as Suryadev's mother
- Aneesh Kailas as Vikraman: Surya's friend
- Devi Chandana as Janaki: Vijayapadman's wife
- Kalesh Kalakkodu as Pratheesh: Vijayapadman's son
- Saranya Visakh as Pallavi: Vijayapadman's daughter
- Sonia Baiju Kottarakkara → Manju Subhash as Ambalika: Abhiram's mother
- Prabha Shankar as Prathapavarma: Abhiram's father
- Amboori Jayan as Abhiram's uncle
- Rajesh Hebbar as Dr. Sriram

- Anu Lakshmi as Nurse Ann Mary: Bhavana's colleague
- Prajusha Gowri as Nurse Rani: Bhavana's colleague
- Bibhu Ebinezer as Surya's friend (2022–2025)
- Alif Shah as Niranjan (2025)
- Sandhya Manoj as SI Chandraprabha
- Navneeth Krishna as Dhruvan
- Parvathy Iyer as Manasa (2024-2025)

=== Guest ===
- Sona Jelina as Young Bhavana (2022)
- Manaved as Young Surya Dev (2022)
- Rebecca Santhosh as Pooja (2023)
- Nithin Jake Joseph as Arjun (2023)
- Rachana Narayanankutty as Herself (2023)
- Sulakshna as Rajeshwari (2023)
- Sreelatha Namboothiri as Maheshwari (2023)
- Krishna Prabha as Madhuri (2023)

=== Cameo in promo ===
- Rebecca Santhosh as Pooja (2022)
- Nithin Jake Joseph as Arjun (2022)
- Aswathy Pillai as Ambili (2022)
- Anna Dona as Anupama (2022)
- Mariya Shilji as Sundari (2022)
- Chandra Lakshman as Sujatha (2022)
- Deva Prasad as Sreekanth (2022)
- Deepika Aradhya as Sreelakshmi (2022)
- Vidyashree Jayaram as Kavya (2022)
- Vishnu Nair as Adharsh (2022)
- Reneesha Rahiman as Anjali (2022)
- Jay Prakash as Abhijith (2022)
- Vindhuja Vikraman as Meera (2022)
- Revathi Krishna as Preethi (2022)

== Production ==
Bhavana is an official remake of Tamil TV series Kayal. The first promo of the show featuring lead actress Stephy Leon was released by Surya TV in June 2022. The show premiered on Surya TV on 26 June 2022 replacing Ente Maathavu. It is telecasted every day at the 8:30 p.m. (IST) time slot.

In July 2022, lead actress Stephy Leon played a cameo appearance as Bhavana in TV series Kaliveedu.

== Soundtrack ==
No.	Title	Singer(s)	Length
1.	"Penne Penne Kanninmaniye"	Sithara Krishnakumar
2.	"Oru Kadha Puthu Kadha Parayam"	Sithara Krishnakumar
