= Saadhana =

Indian Telugu language soap opera

- Genre: Drama family
- Written by: Dialogues; Madhu Sri; Suresh Kakumani
- Directed by: Jayan (1 - 184); Parvatapuram Ramesh (185 - 369); G.K (370 - 487); Parvatapuram Ramesh (488 - 598)
- Starring: Shambhavi Gurumoorthy; Hussain Ahmed Khan
- Opening theme: "Evare evare neevu"
- Country of origin: India
- Original language: Telugu
- No. of episodes: 598

Production
- Executive producer: Koyilada Laxman Rao
- Producers: Sankabattula Kishore Kumar; Abhishek Reddy Bobbala; Harish Rampalli
- Cinematography: Prem Kumar
- Editors: Shirisha Chandramouli Miryala; Chandana Sai Pushpak prithvi sekhar
- Camera setup: Multi-camera
- Running time: 20-22 minutes
- Production companies: Chandana Studios; Abhihara Creations

Original release
- Network: Gemini TV
- Release: 24 January 2022 – 6 January 2024

Saadhana is an Indian Telugu language soap opera premiered on 24 January 2022 airing on GeminiTV and it is available for worldwide streaming on Sun NXT. The serial stars Shambhavi Gurumoorthy and Hussain Ahmed Khan in lead roles. The show is an official remake of Tamil television series Kayal which is being aired on Sun TV.

== Plot ==
Saadhana is a hardworking woman and the only earner in her family. She had many hurdles in her life, like her younger sister's wedding, an uncle determined for her downfall, and workplace harassment. The story revolves around how she bravely fights against these problems.

== Cast ==
- Shambhavi Gurumoorthy as Saadhana
- Hussain Ahmed Khan as Viraj aka Kamal
- Seetha as Meenakshi (Saadhana, Moorthy and Jyothi's mother)
- Haanvika srinivas as Jyothi, Saadhana's younger sister and Vamsi's wife
- Chandu (1-269) /Shanmukha Vickrama (269-present) as Moorthy, Saadhana's elder brother
- Aparna Praveen as Dhanam, Moorthy's wife
- Rafikshaa as Ravi, Saadhana's younger brother
- Fouziee / Priya sreenivas as Deepa, Saadhana's younger sister
- Kota Shankar Rao / Meka Ramakrishna as Gangaraju, Sadhana's elder father
- Sobha Rani / Vijaya as Nagamani, Gangaraju wife
- Shanthi Reddy as Vedavalli, Vamsi mother
- Madhu Menon as Vamsi's father
- Kumrani Sridevi as Indumathi, Viraj's mother
- Ajay as Chandu, Viraj's father
- Basavaraj as Anand, Viraj's friend
- Gopikar as Doctor Gowtham
- Mamta Narayan as Aasha, Gangaraju's daughter and Saadhana's cousin
- Nishanth as Siva, Gangaraju's son and Saadhana's cousin
- Ramesh as Lambu
- Jayalalitha as Rajya Lakshmi
- Sravan Rajesh as Abhiram

== Adaptations ==
Language	Title	Original release	Network(s)	Last aired	Notes
Tamil	Kayal கயல்	25 October 2021	Sun TV	Ongoing	Original
Telugu	Saadhana సాధన	24 January 2022	Gemini TV	6 January 2024	Remake
Kannada	Radhika ರಾಧಿಕಾ	14 March 2022	Udaya TV	29 March 2025	Remake
Bengali	Meghe Dhaka Tara মেঘে ঢাকা তারা	28 March 2022	Sun Bangla	2 July 2023	Remake
Marathi	Majhi Manasa माझी माणसं	30 May 2022	Sun Marathi	1 June 2024	Remake
Malayalam	Bhavana ഭാവന	26 June 2022	Surya TV	29 June 2025	Remake
