= Majhi Manasa =

2022 Indian Marathi language TV series

- Genre: Drama
- Starring: See below
- Country of origin: India
- Original language: Marathi
- No. of episodes: 655

Production
- Producers: Mahesh Kothare; Adinath Kothare
- Production locations: Konkan, Maharashtra
- Camera setup: Multi-camera
- Running time: 22 minutes
- Production company: Kothare Vision

Original release
- Network: Sun Marathi
- Release: 30 May 2022 – 1 June 2024

Related
- Kayal

Majhi Manasa (transl. My People) is an Indian Marathi language TV series starring Janaki Pathak and Sainkeet Kamat in lead roles. It premiered on Sun Marathi from 30 May 2022. It is produced by Mahesh Kothare under the banner of Kothare Vision. It is an official remake of Sun TV series Kayal.

== Synopsis ==
Abandoned by her father and coping with an alcoholic brother, Girija becomes her family's sole provider as a nurse. She finds happiness in her sacrifice to meet the needs of her brother and sisters.

== Cast ==
=== Main ===
- Janaki Pathak as Girija Mayekar
- Sainkeet Kamat as Vikrant Desai

=== Recurring ===
- Vishwanath Kulkarni as Sampat
- Sonam Mhaswekar as Prachi
- Rohan Pednekar as Prasad
- Bhumija Patil as Harshada
- Abhishek Gaonkar as Vighnesh
- Ashish Kulkarni as Jayant
- Vijay Patil as Gaurav
- Sakshi Mahajan as Suchitra
- Shree Patole as Aarya
- Digambar Naik as Ramakant
- Smita Saravade
- Bhagyashri Rane
- Aparna Gokhale
- Aarti More

=== Cameo appearances ===
- Shilpa Shinde
- Vinayak Mali (Dadus)

== Adaptations ==
Language	Title	Original release	Network(s)	Last aired	Notes
Tamil	Kayal கயல்	25 October 2021	Sun TV	Ongoing	Original
Telugu	Saadhana సాధన	24 January 2022	Sun Gemini	6 January 2024	Remake
Kannada	Radhika ರಾಧಿಕಾ	14 March 2022	Sun Udaya	29 March 2025	Remake
Marathi	Majhi Manasa माझी माणसं	30 May 2022	Sun Marathi	1 June 2024	Remake
Malayalam	Bhavana ഭാവന	26 June 2022	Sun Surya	29 June 2025	Remake
