= Manjal Prasadam =

- Genre: Drama, Mythology, Mystery
- Developed by: Anil Bas
- Written by: Biju Raveendran
- Directed by: Pradeep Madhavan
- Creative directors: Greenson Pious and Karthik
- Opening theme: ponnada chutti Mani mandaram choodi
- Country of origin: India
- Original language: Malayalam
- No. of episodes: 49

Production
- Producers: Harsh Kawa; Ravindra Rajawat; Sudeep karat
- Production location: Ottappalam
- Cinematography: Deepak
- Editor: Abhilash Vishwanath
- Camera setup: Multi-camera
- Running time: 22 minutes
- Production company: Spinwheel Production

Original release
- Network: Flowers Television
- Release: 28 November 2016 – 3 February 2017

Manjal Prasadam is an Indian mythological television series which launched on Flowers Television by 28 November 2016

Model turned Actress Ann Mathews essays the main protagonist of the series along with renowned Bharathanatiyam dancer Kalamandalam Radhika playing the role of Nagamadathamma and Kalyani Nair portrays the role of Renuka. Nithin Jake Joseph essays the role of a herpetologist. Renowned Malayalam film producer turned actor Sudeep Karat has played a vital role. The series concluded on 3 February 2017 with 50 episodes.

The show won the Kerala State Television Award in 2017 for the Second Best Tele-serial.

== Plot ==
Manjal Prasadam serial tells story of a family that believes in old Hindu beliefs and sticks to old generation traditions in their living style. A Sarppa Kavu is a place where snakes are worshiped and they are considered like gods giving protection to a family. Turning point of this serial's story is when a new generation girl of this family who studied in city comes to her come with friends. They create some problems and after effect of it is outlined in this beautiful serial Manjal Prasadam.

== Cast ==
=== Main cast ===
- Ann Mathews as Vaishnavi
- Kalamandalam Radhika (Kalaradhi) as Muthasshi / Nagamadathamma/Kunji kutty
- Sanuja as Dakshaki/ Dakshina
- Kalyani Nair as Renuka
- Sudeep Karat as Unni Thampuran

=== Recurring cast ===
- Shahana as Swathy
- Nithin Jake Joseph as Eshwar
- Ajoobsha as Sunder
- Sreerag Ram as Rahul
- Sayana as Kalyani
- Anil Narayan as Narayanan Namboothiri
- Kalamandalam Geethanandan as Bhattathiri
- Dr Jamil David as Sreedharan Namboothiri

== Airing History ==
=== Original airing ===
| Aired | Time |
|---|---|
| 28 November 2016 - 17 December 2016 | Monday - Friday; 09:00PM IST |
| 19 December 2016 - 3 February 2017 | Monday - Friday; 7:30PM IST |
