= Seetha (Malayalam actress) =

Indian actress

- Occupation: Film actor

Seetha Anil is an Indian actress. She handled lead roles and supporting roles during the 1990s in Malayalam, Telugu and Tamil and later shifted her focus to television series. She hails from Tamil Nadu. She was also a famous child artist.

== Partial filmography ==
Year	Film	Role	Language	Notes
1984	Krishna Guruvayoorappa	Unni Namboothiri	Malayalam	Child artist
1985	Mugila Mallige		Kannada	
1991	Vigneshwar	Divya	Tamil	
1991	Idhaya Oonjal	Chithra's friend	Tamil	
1992	Samsarala Mechanic	Sita	Telugu	
1992	Mondi Mogudu Penki Pellam	Street girl	Telugu	
1993	Bhoomi Geetham	Ammukutti	Malayalam	Lead heroine role
1993	Janam	Sreedevi	Malayalam	
1993	Devasuram	Sarada	Malayalam	
1993	Shudhamaddalam	Unnimaya	Malayalam	
1994	Kudumba Vishesham	Deepa	Malayalam	
1994	Pingami	Parvathi	Malayalam	
1994	Bharya	Nithya	Malayalam	
1994	Gandheevam	Seetha	Malayalam	
1994	Varanamalyam	Soumya	Malayalam	
1994	Dadha	Sharada	Malayalam	
1994	Priyanka	Ganga	Tamil	
1994	Thai Maaman	Aamani	Tamil	
1995	Nirnayam	Dr.Parvathi	Malayalam	
1995	Sargavasantham	Sathi	Malayalam	
1995	Maanam Thelinjappol	Unknown	Malayalam	
1995	Jameen Kottai	Rajeswari & Vadivu	Tamil	
1995	Thedi Vandha Raasa	Sumathi	Tamil	
1995	Vajram	Chella	Telugu	
1995	Ravan Raaj: A True Story	Kidnapped lady	Hindi	
1996	Hitlist	Sheela	Malayalam	
1996	Hitler	Ambili	Malayalam	
1996	Family	Kamala	Telugu	
1996	Poovarasan	Sundari	Tamil	
1996	Maa Thalli Gangamma	Seetha	Telugu	debut film as main lead
1996	Meendum Savithri	Gayathri	Tamil	
1996	Neti Savithri	Gayatri	Telugu	
1997	Snehasindooram	Valsala	Malayalam	
1997	Varnapakittu	Sukanya	Malayalam	
1997	Snehadooth	Ammu	Malayalam	Released in 2002
2002	Desam	Gayathri	Malayalam	
2007	Viyabari	Paandi's wife	Tamil	
2009	Currency	Subhadra	Malayalam	
2012	Karppooradeepam	Sethulakshmi	Malayalam	Filmed in 2000; Delayed release

== Television serials ==
Year	Serial	Channel	Language	Role
2000–2001	Chithi	Sun TV	Tamil	Kamini
2000	Galatta Sirippu	Sun TV	Tamil	Abhirami
2000	Vishalam	Rajshri Tamil	Tamil	Vishalam
2000–2001	Oka Stree Katha	Gemini TV	Telugu	Sheela Mary
2000–2002	En Peyar Ranganayaki	Sun TV	Tamil	Kousalya
2000–2002	Sreeman Sreedevi	Asianet	Malayalam	
2001	Oorarinda Rahasiyam	Doordarshan	Tamil	Saroja
2001	Oru Pennin Kathai	Doordarshan	Tamil	Sheela
2001	Vazhkai	Sun TV	Tamil	Sarala
2001–2002	Take It Easy Vazhkai	Sun TV	Tamil	Deepa
2001–2003	Nambikkai	Sun TV	Tamil	Aruna
2003–2004	Janaki	Gemini TV	Telugu	Lakshmi
2004–2007	My Dear Bootham	Sun TV	Tamil	Kaveri
2005	Swantham Malootty	Surya TV	Malayalam	
2005	Aarthi	Raj TV	Tamil	Madhavi
2005–2007	Nimmathi	Sun TV	Tamil	Lakshmi
2006–2012	Kasthuri	Sun TV	Tamil	Amrita
2006–2008	Kalyani	Surya TV	Malayalam	
2007	Veppilaikkari	Sun TV	Tamil	Manonmani
2007	Mazhayariyathe	Surya TV	Malayalam	Devu
2008	Manikoondu	Sun TV	Tamil	Ranganayaki
2009-2011	Uravukku Kai Koduppom	Kalaignar TV	Tamil	Madhu
2018–2019	Azhagiya Tamil Magal	Zee Tamil	Tamil	Saroja
2018	Makkal	Mazhavil Manorama	Malayalam	Babitha
2018	Ninne Pelladatha	Zee Telugu	Telugu	
2019–2021	Sathya	Zee Tamil	Tamil	Janaki
2019–2021	Sundari Neeyum Sundaran Naanum	Star Vijay	Tamil	Chithra
2021–2023	Oohalu Gusasalade	Zee Telugu	Telugu	Susheela
2021–2023	Rettai Roja	Zee Tamil	Tamil	Seetha and Lakshmi
2022–2024	Sadhana	Gemini TV	Telugu	Kamakshi
2022	Kana Kaanum Kaalangal	Disney+Hotstar	Tamil	Maariamma
2024–present	Karthika Deepam 2	Star Maa	Telugu	Sumitra
2024–2025	Sneham Kosam	Gemini TV	Telugu	
2026	Auto Vijayashanthi	Zee Telugu	Telugu	Sujatha

== TV shows ==
- Flowers Oru Kodi - Participant - Malayalam Show
- Naduvula Konjam Disturb Pannuvom - Participant - Tamil Show
