= Stephy Leon =

Indian television actress

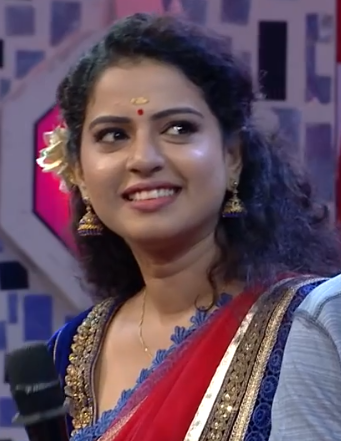
- Born: Stephy Grace; Kozhikode, Kerala, India
- Other name: Sarangi
- Occupation: Actress
- Years active: 2004–present
- Spouse: Leon K Thomas (m. 2014)

Stephy Leon (née Grace), also known by her stage name Sarangi is an Indian television actress who appears in Malayalam-language serials.

== Early life ==
Stephy was born as Stephy Grace to Rajan and Gracy in Kozhikode district of Kerala. She has a younger brother. She is trained in classical dance and karate. She holds a degree in LL.B.

== Career ==
In 2004, Stephy appeared as a Gujarati girl, Nazeen in T. V. Chandran's critically acclaimed film Kathavasheshan.

She debuted in Malayalam television through the lead role in the 2012 tele-serial Manasaveena aired in Mazhavil Manorama in which she played Manasa, a teenage girl. She played double roles in her second serial, Agniputhri, a horror series telecasted on Asianet network in the same year. From 2013 to 2014, she played the lead role in Surya TV's popular show Ishtam.

She played the female lead in the 2014 Malayalam film Life, directed by her husband, Leon K Thomas. She played Meenakshi, a software engineer in the movie.

In 2015, she appeared in Vivahitha, telecasted in Mazhavil Manorama. In 2016, she did double roles of Ranjini Moorthy and Bhadra in TV serial Saagaram Sakshi. In 2017, she was a contestant of reality show Dare the Fear. and Tamaar Padaar. In 2018, she hosted Thakarppan Comedy and Mimicry Mahamela in Mazhavil Manorama. She also appeared in Amrita TV's tele-serial Kshanaprabha Chanjalam in the same year.

In 2019, she played the female lead Lily in Arayannangalude Veedu aired on Flowers TV. She was also seen as a contestant in Star Magic in the same year. From 2022, she is playing the female lead in soap opera Bhavana in Surya TV.

== Filmography ==
=== Films ===
Year	Title	Role	Director	Notes	Ref.
2004	Kadhavaseshan	Nazeem	T.V. Chandran	Credited as Stephy Grace Raj	
2023	Innalekal Thalirkkumbol			Credited as Stephy Leone	

=== Television ===
Year(s)	Show	Role	Channel	Notes	Ref.
2012	Manasaveena	Manasa	Mazhavil Manorama		
2012	Agniputhri	Vipanchika, Annie (Note: Stephy played two characters)	Asianet		
2014–2015	Ishtam	Ganga	Surya TV		
2015	Vivahitha	Devanthi	Mazhavil Manorama		
2016	Saagaram Sakshi	Ranjini Moorthy, Bhadra	Surya TV		
2017	Dare the Fear	Contestant	Asianet		
2017–2019	Tamaar Padaar	Contestant	Flowers TV		
2018	Thakarppan Comedy	Host	Mazhavil Manorama		
2018	Mimicry Mahamela	Host	Mazhavil Manorama		
2018	Kshanaprabha Chanjalam	Anuradha	Amrita TV		
2019	Arayannangalude Veedu	Lily	Flowers TV		
2019	Seetha	Lily	Flowers TV	Cameo appearance	
2019–2021	Star Magic	Contestant	Flowers TV		
2020	Ente Maathavu	Unknown lady	Surya TV		
2021	Funs Upon a Time	Host	Amrita TV		
2021	Aram + Aram = Kinnaram	Contestant	Surya TV		
2022–2025	Bhavana	Bhavana	Surya TV		
2022	Kanalpoovu	Bhavana	Surya TV	Cameo in promo	
2022	Kaliveedu	Bhavana	Surya TV	Cameo	

=== Special appearances ===
Year(s)	Show	Role	Channel	Notes	Ref.
2013	Nammal Thammil	Guest	Asianet		
2015	Take it Easy	Herself	Mazhavil Manorama		
2015	Vanitha	Herself	Mazhavil Manorama		
2015	Smart Show	Participant	Flowers TV		
2017	Taste Time	Guest	Asianet		
2018	Comedy Stars	Guest	Asianet		
2019	Annie's Kitchen	Guest	Amrita TV		
2020	Onamamangam	Herself	Surya TV		
2021	Parayam Nedam	Participant	Amrita TV		
2021	Red Carpet	Mentor	Amrita TV		
2022	Surya Tharasangamam	Bhavana	Surya TV		

== Personal life ==
Director Leon K Thomas married Stephy in 2014.
