= Gouri Shankaram =

Indian television series

- കൊടുങ്കാറ്റായ ശങ്കരന്റെ കഥ
- Also known as: GS
- Genre: Drama; Romance
- Created by: Spellbound Production
- Written by: Pearl Grey (original); Manoj Ramachandran
- Directed by: Abhi balakrishna; Manju dharman; Sarin
- Creative director: Pearl Grey
- Starring: Harishanker; Veena Nair
- Theme music composer: Vidhyadharan Master
- Opening theme: "Ambili kala" by Vidyadharan, sung by Kavalam Sreekumar, lyrics by BK Harinarayan
- Ending theme: "Ente pennu ival ente pennu Sankara ninnudal pathiyolu"
- Country of origin: India
- Original language: Malayalam
- No. of seasons: 1
- No. of episodes: 407

Production
- Producer: Krishnan Sethukumar
- Production location: Trivandrum
- Cinematography: Manoj Kumar
- Editor: Adarsh Balachandran Selvarajan
- Running time: 20-22 minutes
- Production company: Movieemill

Original release
- Network: Asianet
- Release: 3 July 2023 – 27 December 2024

Related
- Mann Kee Awaaz Pratigya

Gouri Shankaram (transl. Gouri and Shankar) is an Indian Malayalam television series that aired from 3 July 2023 to 27 December 2024 on Asianet and streaming on Disney+ Hotstar. The show is an official remake of the Hindi soap opera Mann Kee Awaaz Pratigya. The title of the series is adapted from 2003 Malayalam film Gowrisankaram. The story revolves around the life of Sankar Mahadevan (lord Siva devotee), love at first sight for Shankar when he encounters Gouri, an upright girl.

== Plot ==
The story revolves around the life of Lord Vadakkumnadha devotee Sankar (Sankar bhayi ) who unfortunately met with a girl named Gouri, a college girl whose life changes after she enters wedlock with her obsessive and die-hard lover, Sanker. Gouri is a girl of principles taught by her father, Shyam. Sanker, on the other hand, is opposite, always following his principles in life and being the master of his decisions. Sanker always confidant in his muscular body physique, and he always tries to win others with his extraordinary muscle power.

The show takes a new turn when Sanker falls head over heels for Gouri and makes all his efforts to make her his wife. Later, Gouri teaches him that the pure love of a girl cannot be bought with men's muscle power. The series shows the negative shades of stalking and forced marriage. Actor Harisanker played the role of Sankar bhayi set a new trend for heroic charactrisation in Malayalam serial.

== Cast ==
=== Main ===
- Hari Shanker as Sankar Mahadevan (Sankar bhayi), main protagonist: Radhamani and Mahadevan's second eldest son; Shekar's and Veni's brother; Kamala, Arathi and Adarsh's brother-in-law; Gouri's husband (2023–2024)
- Veena Nair as Gouri Sankar: Nandhini and Shyamprasad's eldest daughter; Adarsh and Arathi's sister; Shankar's wife; Veni's sister-in-law (2023–2024)

=== Recurring ===
- Akshaya Raghavan as Krishnaveni "Veni" Adarsh: Radhamani and Mahadevan's youngest daughter; Shekar's and Sankar's younger sister; Adarsh's wife; Kamala's, Gouri's and Arathi's sister-in-law (2023–2024)
- Kannan Balachandran as Adarsh: Nandhini's and Shyamprasad's eldest son; Veni's husband; Gouri's and Arathi's brother; Shekar's and Sankar's brother-in-law (2023–2024)
- Nitheesh Purushothaman as Dhruvan: main antagonist (2023–2024)
- Sathyajith as Charangattu Mahadevan: Radhamani's husband; Shekar, Sankar and Veni father; Kamala, Gouri and Adarsh's father-in-law (2023–2024)
- Sylaja Sreedharan Nair (2023–2024) / Jennifer Antony (2024) as Radhamani Thankachi: Mahadevan's wife; Shekar's, Sankar's and Veni's mother; Kamala's, Gouri's and Adarsh's mother-in-law
- Nisha Mathew as Nandhini Shyamprasad: Shyamprasad's wife; Adarsh, Gouri and Arathi's mother; Veni and Sankar's mother-in-law (2023–2024)
- Ravikrishnan Gopalakrishnan as Professor Shyamaprasad: Nandhini's husband; Adarsh, Gouri and Arathi's father; Veni and Sankar's father-in-law (2023–2024)
- Kripa Sekhar as Arathi: Nandhini's and Shyamprasad's youngest daughter; Adarsh's and Gouri's sister; Veni's and Sankar's sister-in-law (2023–2024)
- Thomas Bilgin as Shekar Mahadevan: Radhamani's and Mahadevan's eldest son; Sankar's and Veni's brother; Kamala's husband (2023–2024)
- Deepa Prabha as Kamala: Radhamani's and Mahadevan's daughter-in-law; Shekar's wife; Sankar's and Veni's sister-in-law (2023–2024)
- Renjin Raj in dual role as
  - Naveen (antagonist): Gouri's ex-fiancée
  - Dr. Mithun (2023–2024)
- Athira Praveen as Deepa: Gouri's friend and Adarsh's former love interest (2023–2024)
- Santhosh Sanjay as Ajith
- Gautham Girish as Shaan
- Subha Sumithran as Ambika Devi
- Abhilash Rokey as Afsal
- Cleetus Paul as Cleetus
- Ajayan Unni as Joju
- Athira Murali as Ganga
- Sreerang Shine as Saravanan Shankaran

=== Guest appearances ===
- Bheeman Raghu as SI Somashekharan (2023)
- Vinay Forrt as Himself (2023)
- Nithin Jake Joseph as Adv.Harshan (2024)

== Production ==
It is produced by Krishnan Sethukumar under the banner of Moviemill. Veena P Nair signed to play the title role, along with Harishankar. Nisha Mathew and Ravikrishnan were retained from the previous project Koodevide.

== Reception & awards ==
The show was launched on 3 July 2023 at 9.30 PM IST. In December 2023, The show entered Top fifth position in TRP ratings. On March 11, 2024, the show was shifted to 6.30 PM due to launch of Bigg Boss season 6. Later the series shifted to 10.30pm. After that they had taken a temporary halt and continued at afternoon slot of 3 pm. The series went off-air on 27 December 2024. The pair of the show were praised by the audience for their romantic performance .
