= Nithin Jake Joseph =

Indian television actor

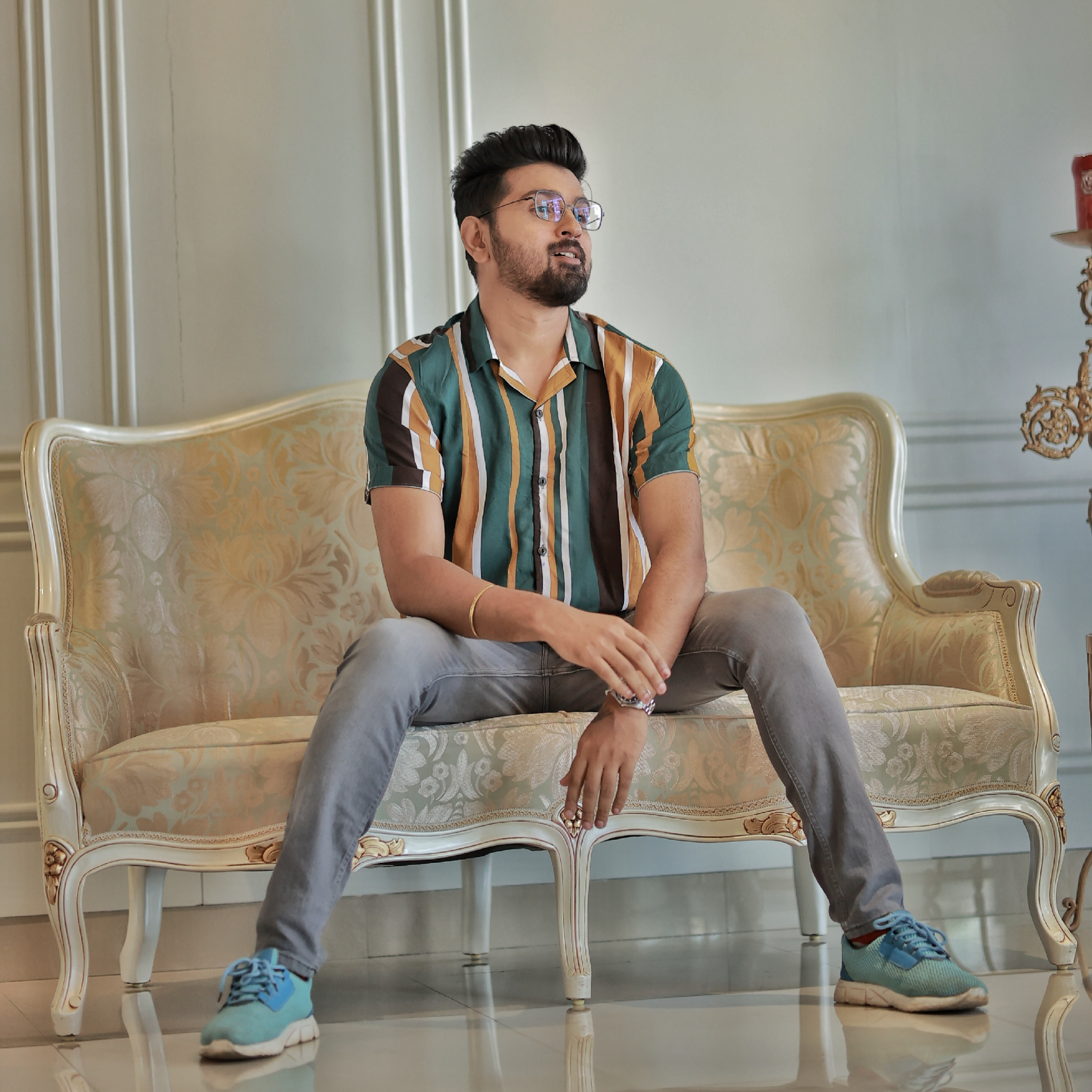
- Occupation: Actor
- Years active: 2016–present
- Known for: Neelakkuyil; Kaliveedu
- Spouse: Angitha
- Children: 1

Nithin Jake Joseph is an Indian television actor who appears in Malayalam-language television shows. He is known for his roles as Aadhithyan in the soap opera Neelakkuyil and Arjun in Kaliveedu.

== Career ==
Nithin has played minor roles in feature films Anuraga Karikkin Vellam (2016) and The Great Father (2017). He has also played the lead roles in the feature film Mashipachayum Kallupencilum and the short film Akshitha (2021).

He made his television debut in the mythological television series Manjal Prasadam aired in Flowers from 2016 to 2017. He played the role of Eshwar, a herpetologist. The show won the Kerala State Television Award in 2017 for the Second Best Tele-serial.

He then played the titular character of Adhityan in Asianet's popular soap-opera drama Neelakkuyil. His popularity from the show gained him a spot in the "Most Desirable Men on Television" list published by The Times of India in 2019.

He played a doting younger brother, Harikrishnan, in his third serial Jeevitha Nouka telecasted on Mazhavil Manorama. He also played in the serial Kaliveeduas the role of Advocate Arjun, which is an official remake of the successful Tamil show Roja. Currently he is work in two serials, snehapoorvam shyama and Kattathe killikoodu

== Personal life ==
Joseph is an engineer-turned-actor. He is married to Angitha. They have a son. He joined the Bharatiya Janata Party in 2019.

== Filmography ==
=== Films ===
Year	Title	Role	Notes	Ref.
2016	Anuraga Karikkin Vellam	Abhi's friend		
2017	The Great Father	Police Officer		
2021	Akshitha	Adharsh	Short film	
2022	Mashipachayum Kallupencilum	Prakashan	Lead role	

=== Television ===
Year	Title	Role	Network	Notes	Ref.
2016–2017	Manjal Prasadam	Eshwar	Flowers TV		
2018–2020	Neelakkuyil	Jrn. Aadhithyan (Aadhi)	Asianet		
2019–2020	Comedy Stars Season 2	as Guest	Asianet	Episodes: 486, 1234, 1260	
2020	Kutty Chef	Guest	Kairali TV	Episode 13	
2020–2021	Jeevitha Nouka	Palakkal Harikrishnan (Hari)	Mazhavil Manorama	Replacing Win Sagar	
2021	Aram + Aram = Kinnaram	Contestant	Surya TV		
2021–2024	Kaliveedu	Adv. Arjun	Surya TV		
2022 -2023	Naattu Midukki	Adv. Arjun	Surya TV	Episode: 2 Also cameo in promo	
2022-2024	Bhavana	Adv. Arjun	Surya TV	Recurring guest appearance	
2023	Onamamankam	Guest	Surya TV		
2024	Gouri Shankaram	Adv.Harshan	Asianet		
2024	Mangalyam Thanthunanena	Arjun	Surya TV		
2024	Chandrikayilaliyunna Chandrakantham	Adithyan	Asianet		
2024	Campusile Onam	Host	Surya TV	Onam special program	
2024–present	Snehapoorvam Shyama	Varun	Zee Keralam		
2024	Valsalyam	Varun	Zee Keralam	Cameo Appearance	
2025–present	Kattathe Kilikkoodu	Subhash	Asianet		

=== Webseries ===
Year	Title	Role	Notes	Ref.
2022	OJO Kanmani	Rahul		

== Awards and nominations ==
Nithin Jake Joseph awards and nominations
Awards and nominations
Award	Wins	Nominations

Totals (Note: Certain award groups do not simply award one winner. They acknowledge several different recipients, have runners-up, and have third place. Since this is a specific recognition and is different from losing an award, runner-up mentions are considered wins in this award tally. For simplification and to avoid errors, each award in this list has been presumed to have had a prior nomination.)
- Wins: 5
- Nominations: 3

Year	Award	Category	Work	Result	Ref.
2019	24 Frame Shanthadevi Awards	Best Actor	Neelakkuyil	Won	
2019	Asianet Television Awards	Best New Face (Male)	Neelakkuyil	Won	
2019	Asianet Television Awards	Best Star Pair (With Latha Sangaraju)	Neelakkuyil	Nominated	
2019	Asianet Television Awards	Most Popular Actor	Neelakkuyil	Nominated	
2019	Asianet Television Awards	Best Actor	Neelakkuyil	Nominated	
2020	Gramadharavu Excellency Awards	Best Actor	Neelakkuyil	Won	
2020	Gramadharavu Excellency Awards	Best Star Pair (With Latha Sangaraju)	Neelakkuyil	Won	
2021	24 Frame Global Excellency Serial Award	Best Actor	Kaliveedu	Won	
2022	Gramadharavu Excellency Awards	—N/a	Kaliveedu	Won	
