= Kalamandalam Radhika =

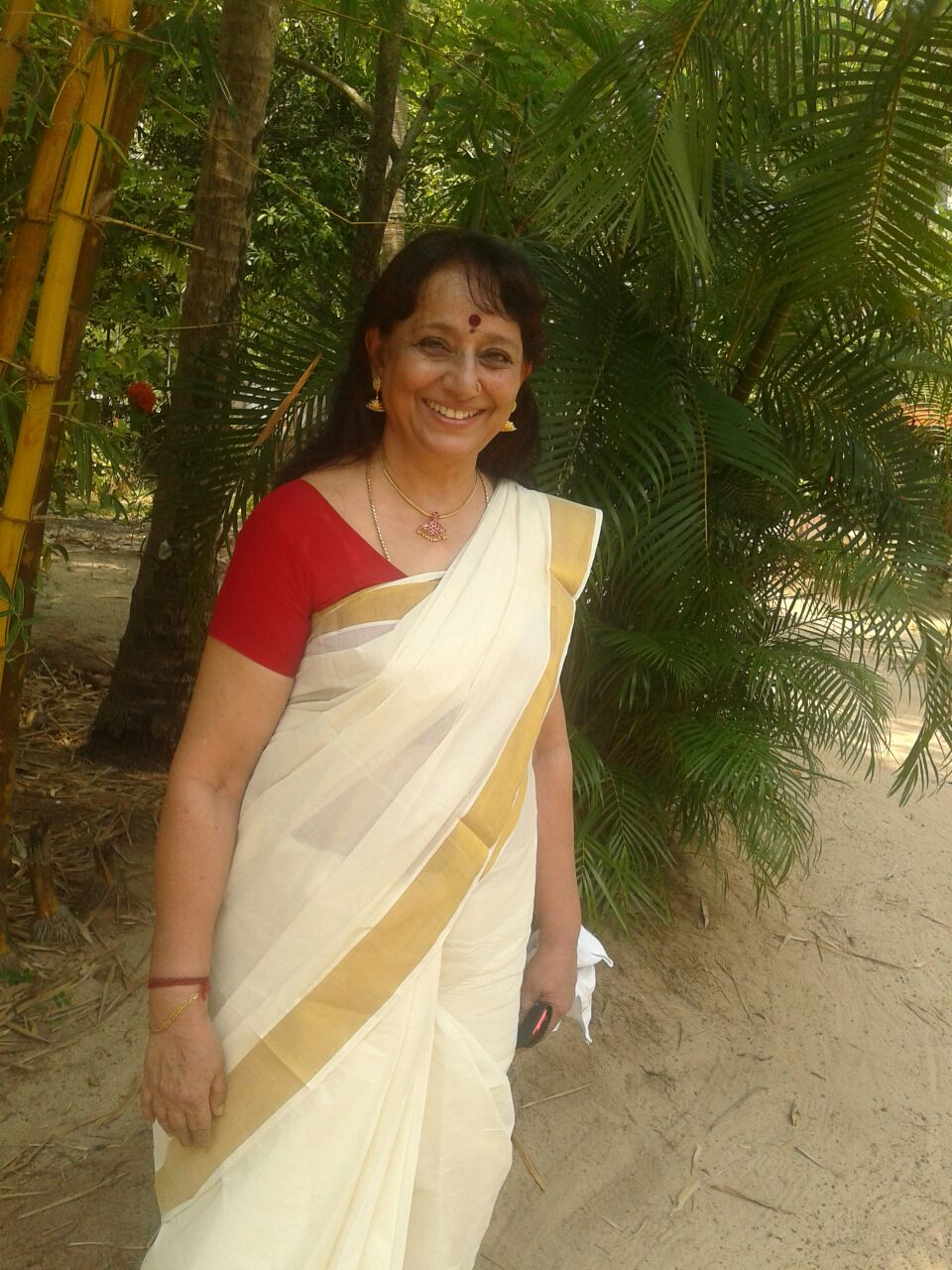
- Kalamandalam Radhika
- Born: Bangalore
- Occupations: Dancer, choreographer and stage performer

Kalamandalam Radhika is an Indian classical dancer, choreographer, research scholar, teacher, writer and philanthropist. She was the first non-resident Keralite to win the Kerala Sangeetha Nataka Akademi Award for Mohiniyattom. She learnt Kuchipudi, Bharatanatyam, Kathakali and other dance forms.

== Early years and education ==
Kalamandalam Radhika was born in Bangalore to K.K Nair, a chartered accountant. She started learning dancing at the age of three under Guru Rajan, and later learnt Kathakali from Muttar Sri. Narayana Panicker and mridhangamvaitharis from Guru Ponniahpillai. In the late 1960s, she moved to Cheruthuruthy and stayed at the Kalamandalam for four years. Under the wings of Chinnammu Amma, Kalamandalam Sathyabhama and Kalamandalam Padmanabhan Nair she was moulded into a skilled performer. Her tutelage under the late Kalamandalam Kalyani Kutty Amma and her training under Kalamandalam Padmanabha Ashan in Kathakali honed her skills.

== Dancer and choreographer ==
She has conducted more than two thousand performances in India and abroad at national and international levels. She is a member of the UNESCO International Dance Council, and has conducted her performances for WHO delegates, SAARC delegates, diplomats, Soviet representatives, and others. To explore the depths of Mohiniyattom, she has undertaken extensive research, and re-organized the basic steps, jewellery and costumes worn by Mohiniyattom dancers of the early 1940s. She has executed and choreographed biblical themes including the advent of Christianity in India, and the birth of Christ.

Radhika has conducted workshops in US, UK, Europe, Atlanta, and Germany. She has also choreographed and danced for Behold Thy Mother, a biblical film directed by an Italian priest Fr.Gerard. She has composed and choreographed five cholkettus, three varnams and innumerable padams in different languages. She was criticized for performing biblical themes in Mohiniattam, but the poetical works of VeerappaMoily, Kuvempu, Fr. Abel, Amruth Someshwar and St. Chavara as adapted by Radhika were well received.

== Author ==
Radhika has written numerous articles for the dance and music magazine Shrutilaya and has submitted a paper on Mohiniyattom at a seminar organized by the NCERT on the subject of ‘Dance Education in Schools'. She has also written an article about the Devadasi system of Kerala for the weekly Indu, published from Houston, USA, and is the author of the books 'Mohiniyattom-The Lyrical Dance of Kerala´ and ‘Mudra’ published by Mathrabhoomi.

== Appearances ==
Television

Year	Film	Role	Channel	Language	Notes
2006	Shakunam	Nun	DD Malayalam	Malayalam	Telefilm
2011-2012	Kadhayile Rajakumari	Abhi's Mother	Mazhavil Manorama	Malayalam	Serial
2016-2017	Manjal Prasadam	Nagamadathamma	Flowers TV	Malayalam	Serial
2018	Charutha	Herself	Kerala Vision	Malayalam	
2018	Aa Yathrayil	Herself	Safari TV	Malayalam	
2018	Straight Line	Herself	Kaumudy TV	Malayalam	
2019–2021	Sumangali Bhava	Muthassi	Zee Keralam	Malayalam	Serial
2023	Slave Market	Hanima	MBC Group	English-Arabic	International TV Series
2025– 2026	Pavithram	Ammini Achamma	Asianet	Malayalam	Serial
2026– present	Pavithram 2	Ammini Achamma	JioHotstar	Malayalam	Serial

Film

Year	Film	Role	language
2023	Valatty	Owner of Bruno	Malayalam
2022	Innale Vare	Ramaniyamma	Malayalam
2018	Marunnu (short)	Umma	Malayalam
2014	Namma Gramam	Narayani	Tamil
2013	Cleopatra	Inmate	Malayalam
2012	Gramam	Narayani	Malayalam
2012	Chapters	Lady at hospital	Malayalam
2012	Ordinary	Jose's mother	Malayalam
2011	Veeraputhran	Vayattati	Malayalam
2010	Kadha Thudarunnu	Principal	Malayalam
2010	Janaki	Santha Cheriyamma	Malayalam
2009	Ritu	Sarath's mother	Malayalam
2008	Innathe Chintha Vishayam	Noushad's Aunt	Malayalam
2008	De Ingottu Nokkiye	Politician	Malayalam
2007	Vinodayathra	Doctor	Malayalam
2007	Nivedyam	Ramavarma Thampuran's sister	Malayalam
2006	Rasathanthram	Nun	Malayalam
2005	Achuvinte Amma	Moothumma's relative	Malayalam
1982	Kilukilukkam	Dance teacher	Malayalam

Endorsement

- Oxygen - The Digital Shop Advertisement
- Pankajakasturi

== See also ==
- Kalamandalam Padmanabhan Nair
- Kalamandalam Kalyanikutty Amma
- Kalamandalam Satyabhama
- Mohiniyattam
