= Kayal (TV series) =

2021 Indian Tamil language TV series

- Genre: Family drama
- Screenplay by: Karthik Yuvaraj; Iyyappan
- Directed by: P. Selvam
- Creative director: Vaidehi Ramamoorthy
- Starring: Chaitra Reddy; Sanjeev Karthik
- Opening theme: "Kanne Kanne Kanninmaniye Nee Kelamma"; K. S. Chitra (vocals); Pa. Vijay (lyrics)
- Country of origin: India
- Original language: Tamil
- No. of episodes: 1555

Production
- Production location: Tamil Nadu
- Cinematography: U. K. Senthil Kumar
- Editors: M. S. Thiyagarajan; M. Prabakaran
- Production companies: Sun Entertainment; Vision Time India Private Limited

Original release
- Network: Sun TV
- Release: 25 October 2021 – 24 October 2026

Kayal is a 2021 Indian Tamil language television series starring Chaitra Reddy and Sanjeev Karthik.

The series premiered on 25 October 2021 and ended on 24 Ocotober 2026 making it one of the longest running serials on Sun TV and is also available on the digital platform Sun NXT. It is directed by P. Selvam and produced by Vision Time India Private Limited in association with Sun Entertainment.

== Plot ==
Abandoned by her father Muthuvel & coping with an alcoholic brother Moorthy, Kayal works as a nurse to become her family's sole provider. She finds happiness in her sacrifice to meet the needs of her brother: Moorthy and Anbu & sisters: Devi and Anandhi.

== Cast ==
=== Main ===
- Chaitra Reddy as Kayal Muthuvel (Kayalvizhi): Muthuvel and Kamatchi's daughter (2021–2026)
- Sanjeev Karthick as Ezhil Rajasekhar (Ezhilarasan): Rajasekhar and Sivasankari's son (2021–2026)

=== Recurring ===
- Meenakumari as Kamatchi: Muthuvel's widow; Kayal, Moorthy, Devi, Anbu and Anandhi's mother (2021–2026)
- Vazhakku En Muthuraman as Dharmalingam (Dharma): Vadivu's husband; (Antagonist turned Protagonist) (2021–2026)
- Sumangali as Vadivukarasi "Vadivu" Dharmalingam: Dharmalingam's wife; (Antagonist)(2021–2026)
- Hema Srikanth as Vedhavalli "Valli" Chandrasekhar: Chandrasekhar's wife; (Antagonist)(2021–2026)
- Gayatri Jayaraman / Uma Riyaz Khan as Sivasankari "Sankari" Rajasekhar: Rajasekhar's wife; (Main Antagonist)(2021–2022 / 2022–2026)
- Iyyappan Unni / Vishwanathan Shyam as Moorthy Muthuvel @ (Assan): Kamatchi and Muthuvel's eldest son; (2021–2025 / 2025–2026)
- Janaki Devi / Subha Geetha as Dhanam Moorthy: Moorthy's wife (2021–2024 / 2024–2026)
- Baby Dechina as Anu Moorthy: Moorthy and Dhanam's daughter; (2021–2026)
- Ishwarya Ravichandran / Nila Gracy as Devi Vigneshwaran: Kamatchi and Muthuvel's younger daughter; (2021–2023 / 2023–2026)
- Gopi as Vigneshwaran "Vignesh" Chandrasekhar: Chandrasekhar and Vedhavalli's son; (2021–2026)
- Avinash Ashok / Harry / Jeeva Rajendran as Sub-inspector Anbu (Anbuselvan) Muthuvel: Kamatchi and Muthuvel's younger son; (2021–2022 / 2022 / 2022–2026)
- Preethi Suresh / Sathyapriya Sivasamy as Shalini Anbuselvan: Chandrasekhar and Vedhavalli's daughter; Anbu's wife (2022 / 2022–2026)
- Abinavya Deepak as Anandhi Muthuvel: A Doctor; Kamatchi and Muthuvel's youngest daughter; (2021–2026)

=== Other cast ===
- Shaashvi Bala / VJ Akshaya as Deepika: Ezhil's one-sided obsessive lover and Kayal's arch rival (Antagonist)(2024–2026 / 2026)
- Sebastian as Petter Arumugam: Moorthy's worker; Kayal's foster family member (2021–2026)
- Muralidhar Raj as Rajasekhar: Sivasankari's husband; Ezhil's father (2021–2026)
- Fawaz Zayani as Subramaniyam "Subramani" Dharmalingam: Dharmalingam and Vadivu's son; Aarthi's brother; Pavithra's husband (Antagonist)(2021–2025)
- Hensha Deepan as Pavithra Subramaniyam: Subramaniyam's wife (2023–2025)
- Kiran Mai as Aarthi Anand: Dharmalingam and Vadivu's daughter; Subramani's sister; Anand's wife (2021–2025)
- Rothit Balaiah as Anand: Ezhil's best friend; Aarthi's husband (2021–2026)
- Varun Udhai as Dr. Gowtham: Kayal's rival (Antagonist) (2021–2026)
- VM Rajesh Kanna as Chandrasekhar: Vedhavalli's husband; father of Vignesh and Shalini (2021–2024)
- Ghouse Nisha as Uma: Vignesh's one-sided obsessive lover and Kayal's rival (Antagonist)(2021–2025)
- Arandhangi Manjula as Uma's mother (2021–2022)
- Annapoorani as Vanitha: A nurse and Gowtham's follower (Antagonist) (2021–2026)
- Jeganathan as Ex-MLA Sethusingam: Vedhavalli's brother (Antagonist)(2021–2026)
- Swathi Reddy as Ramya: A nurse and Kayal's best friend (2021–2023)
- Suruli as Hospital Dean (2022–2024)
- Birla Bose as Inspector Vajravel (2023–2025)
- Reehana as Prabhu's mother (2023)
- Ravikumar as Prabhu's father (2023)
- Sidharth Kapilavayi as Prabhu (2023)
- J. Durai Raj as Manoj (2025)
- Indiran as Bruce Lee: Shiva's friend (2026)

=== Special appearances ===
- Bala Singh as Muthuvel: Kamatchi's husband; (posthumous photographic appearance)
- Bharathi Mohan as young Muthuvel (2025; in flashbacks only)
- Gabriella Sellus as Sundari (2022) from Sundari
- Jishnu Menon as Karthick (2022) from Sundari
- Riya Manoj as Abhirami (2022)
- Nidhish Kutty as Ilamukhil (2022)
- Aadhish Jatti Jaganathan as Sumo (2022)
- Nimeshika Radhakrishnan as Meera (2022)
- Rahul Ravi as Yuva (2022)
- Vadivukkarasi as Rajalakshmi (2023)
- Aila Syed as Kayal and Ezhil’s daughter in dreams (2023)
- Baladitya as Suryakumar: Kayal's fake husband (2023)
- Anusha Prathap as Eshwari (2023)
- Chandra Lakshman as Rajalakshmi (2024)
- Vijay Vishwa as Saravana Velu: Kayal's one-sided obsessive lover (2024–2025)
- Eesan Sujatha as Meenatchi: Saravana Velu's mother (2024, 2025)
- Sonia Agarwal as Herself (2025)
- Ajay Kapoor as Judge Arulmozhi Varman (2025)
- Annam family members in Megasangamam (2025)
- Marumagal family members in Megasangamam and Mahasangamam (2025,2026)
- TSR Srinivasan as Train Passenger (2025)
- Y. G. Mahendran as Sakthivel Kalingarayar (2025)
- Manya Anand as Kanmani
- Tharun Appasamy as Kaushik (2026)
- Nalini as Meenatchi (2026)
- A.Ravivarma as Ramachandran (2026)
- Riya Vishwanathan as Sakthi: Kayal's best friend (2026)
- Jishnu Menon as Shiva: Raajiyam's son (2026)
- Keerthana as Raajiyam: Shiva's mother (2026)
- Baby Joyce as Sakthi's mother (2026)

== Production ==
=== Development ===
After the conclusion of Sun TV's drama Abhiyum Naanum, its production company, Vision Time India Pvt. Ltd., decided to produce Kayal. The concept of the show was originally based on K. Balachander's 1987 film Manathil Urudhi Vendum. This is the 15th serial produced for Sun TV. The first promotional video was released on 11 October 2021.

=== Casting ===
Actress Chaitra Reddy was cast in the lead role, marking her return to television after starring in Zee Tamil's drama Yaaradi Nee Mohini. Sanjeev Karthik was cast opposite her. Actor "Vazhakku En" Muthuraman was cast as the main antagonist, Dharmalingam alias Dharma.

Gayatri Jayaraman was selected to portray the role of Sivasankari Rajasekhar (Ezhilarasan's mother), a negative character. In February 2022, she quit the series and was replaced by Uma Riyaz Khan. On 15 May 2024, actress Chandra Lakshman joined the cast to portray another negative role.

== Reception ==
Kayal became one of the most-watched Tamil television programs from its launch week in 2021. In the BARC era of Tamil serials, it is the only show to claim the No. 1 position in its launch week itself.

The show climbed into the top 5 most-watched programs across all GECs within just a few weeks of its launch. It also gave strong competition to Bharathi Kannamma aired on Star Vijay.

== Adaptations ==
| Language | Title | Original release | Network(s) | Last aired | Notes | Ref. |
|---|---|---|---|---|---|---|
| Tamil | Kayal கயல் | 25 October 2021 | Sun TV | 24 October 2026 | Original | |
| Telugu | Saadhana సాధన | 24 January 2022 | Sun Gemini | 6 January 2024 | Remake | |
| Kannada | Radhika ರಾಧಿಕಾ | 14 March 2022 | Sun Udaya | 29 March 2025 | Remake | |
| Bengali | Meghe Dhaka Tara | 28 March 2022 | Sun Bangla | 2 July 2023 | Remake | |
| Marathi | Majhi Manasa माझी माणसं | 30 May 2022 | Sun Marathi | 1 June 2024 | Remake | |
| Malayalam | Bhavana ഭാവന | 26 June 2022 | Sun Surya | 29 June 2025 | Remake | |

== Awards and honours ==
| Year | Award (Note: Awards, festivals and organizations are in Alphabetical order.) | Category | Recipient(s) | Result | Ref. |
|---|---|---|---|---|---|
| 2022 | Sun Kudumbam Viruthugal | Best Actress | Chaitra Reddy | Won | |
| 2022 | Sun Kudumbam Viruthugal | Best Villain Male | Muthuraman | Won | |
| 2022 | Sun Kudumbam Viruthugal | Best Director | Selvam | Won | |
| 2022 | Sun Kudumbam Viruthugal | Best Serial | Kayal | Won | |
| 2022 | Sun Kudumbam Viruthugal | Natchathira Nayagan | Sanjeev Karthick | Won | |
| 2022 | Sun Kudumbam Viruthugal | Best Screenplay dialogue | Karthik yuvaraj | Won | |
| 2022 | Sun Kudumbam Viruthugal | Best Lyrics Writer | Pa Vijay | Won | |
| 2023 | Sun Kudumbam Viruthugal | Best Actress | Chaitra Reddy | Won | |
| 2025 | Sun Kudumbam Viruthugal | Best Actress | Chaitra Reddy | Won | |
| 2025 | Sun Kudumbam Viruthugal | Best Serial | Kayal | Won | |
