= Kaliveedu (TV series) =

Indian Malayalam-language soap opera

- Title Intro
- Genre: Soap opera
- Based on: Roja by Saregama
- Written by: M. C. Ratheesh
- Screenplay by: M. C. Ratheesh
- Story by: Vasubharathy
- Directed by: Dileep Kumar; Kannan Thamarakkulam; Manjudharman
- Creative director: M. C. Ratheesh
- Starring: Rebecca Santhosh; Nithin Jake Joseph; (See below)
- Voices of: Devi S.; Siddharthan; RJ Neenu; Bhagyalakshmi
- Theme music composer: Sanand George
- Opening theme: "Unarum Nilavu Polaval"
- Composer: Sanand George
- Country of origin: India
- Original language: Malayalam
- No. of episodes: 1000

Production
- Executive producer: Ravi Prasad
- Producer: Shan A
- Production location: Thiruvananthapuram
- Cinematography: Anurag Guna; Hemachandran
- Editors: Ajay Prasannan; Jerry Amal Chavara
- Camera setup: Multi-camera
- Running time: 20-22 minutes
- Production company: Cyabio films

Original release
- Network: Surya TV
- Release: 15 November 2021 – 22 September 2024

Related
- Roja

Kaliveedu (transl. The House of Entertainment) was an Indian Malayalam-language soap opera directed by Dileep Kumar. The show aired from 15 November 2021 to 22 September 2024 on Surya TV. It stars Rebecca Santhosh and Nithin Jake Joseph in lead roles along with Gayathri Mayura, Uma Nair, Krishna Prabha and Sreelatha Namboothiri in pivotal roles. It is an official remake of Tamil TV series Roja.

== Plot ==
Pooja is raised in an orphanage, Snehasadhanam by her foster-father Vishwanathan and has a sweet, kind disposition. She, in reality, is Anu, the long-lost daughter of Nandagopan and the late Arunima. She was separated from her family following an accident which killed her mother and supposedly her too. The accident was plotted by her paternal uncle, Shankar Ram for inheriting her father's wealth. She comes across her living father, Nandagopan and develops a bond with him, though unaware of their relationship. Arjun, humble despite his wealth, is a leading criminal lawyer. Pooja and Arjun meet several times and develop a mutual dislike for each other due to their contrasting personalities.

Vishwanathan rejects the business offer of Sakshi, a crooked businesswoman who wishes to buy Snehasadanam ashram. To get rid of Vishwanathan, she frames him for the murder of Theja with the help of Priya, another inmate of Snehasadanam. Nandagopan takes up the case. Priya masquerades herself as the long-lost Anu and returns to Nandagopan. Due to Pooja and Priya's varying statements on the Theja murder Case, Nandagopan backs off from the case, causing Pooja to look for another lawyer. Pooja attempts to hire Arjun but he backs off citing that his remuneration is beyond her capacity.

Arunima's family reunites with fake Anu and decides to get her married to Arjun, who is her cousin. Arjun who loathes love and marriage refuses but eventually has to relent due to the family's pressure. To break the marriage, he puts a condition ahead of Pooja to enter a one-year contract marriage with him in return for him acquitting her father without any fees. Without another choice, Pooja accepts the offer. The two secretly marry in a temple on Arjun's engagement day and pretend like a married couple in front of the family. Priya and Arjun's aunt, Madhumita, who hates Pooja because of a past incident, try to discredit and endanger Pooja several times but fail in every attempt. Over time, Arjun and Pooja develop a good friendship bond and fall for each other.

Akhil falls in love with a feisty girl, Sneha and secretly marries her when the family decides to get him married to Priya. Arjun and Pooja discover that Arunima was alive all along and is living as a nurse after suffering memory loss and reunite her with the family.

== Cast ==
=== Main ===
- Rebecca Santhosh in dual role as:
  - Pooja Arjun / Real Anu
    - Adv. Nandagopan and Arunima's daughter, Anu, who was separated from her family as a toddler following an accident. Unaware of her true identity, she grew up as an orphan named Pooja in Snehasadanam Ashram. She married Arjun, her cousin, under a one-year contract in return for releasing her jailed foster father, Vishwanathan. She later falls in love with Arjun. (2021–present)
  - Rani
    - Pooja's long-lost half-sister.
- Nithin Jake Joseph as Adv. Arjun
  - A successful criminal lawyer; Arunima's nephew and Anu's cousin. Arjun, who disapproves of romantic love and marital relationships, enters into a contract marriage with Pooja to break his engagement with Priya and to stop any further marriage proposals from his family. However, he eventually changes his opinion on marriages and falls in love with Pooja. (2021–present)

=== Recurring ===
- Gayathri Mayura as Priya alias Fake Anu
  - A fellow inmate of Pooja in Snehasadanam who hates her since childhood. She is a criminally minded woman who forged herself as the long-lost Anu and made a fake murder accusation against Vishwanathan. Initially, she wishes to marry Arjun and then his brother, Akhil, for her secure future. (2021–present)
- Uma Nair as Madhuri Anand
  - Arjun's mother; a devoted homemaker. She accepts Pooja as her daughter-in-law despite the disapproval of the rest of the family and develops a motherly bond with her. She is kind-hearted and soft-spoken and wishes to bind her family together. (2021–present)
- Neena Kurup as Arunima alias Nurse Indulekha
  - Nandagopan's wife and Pooja's biological mother who was believed to be killed in an accident. She was later revealed to be alive leading her life as a nurse after suffering a memory loss. (2021–present)
- Krishna Prabha as Madhumita alias Madhu
  - Arunima and Anand's younger sister; Arjun's paternal aunt. A crooked woman who has teamed up with Priya due to their common hatred towards Pooja. Her internal motive is to create problems in the family to gain power and money for herself. (2021–present)
- Sreelatha Namboothiri as Maheshwariyamma
  - Arunima, Anand and Madhumita's mother and the family matriach. She is an affectionate and headstrong lady with her own views and ethics who is still mourning the death of her daughter, Arunima. She wishes Priya to be her granddaughter-in-law believing her to be the real Anu and therefore disapproves of Arjun's marriage with Pooja. (2021–present)
- Jeevan Gopal as Akhil
  - Arjun's younger brother who takes care of the family business. He supports his brother's marriage and initially adored Pooja. Though he later starts hating her influenced by Priya's charm but soon discovers Priya's criminal actions and regains his respect towards Pooja. (2021–present)
- Amrutha Nair as Sneha
  - Akhil's wife. An LLB graduate, she is a no-nonsense girl. (2022–present)
- Vijayakumari Ramesh as Kanakam
  - The long-time domestic help of Arjun's family who is considered as their family member. She finds Pooja lovable from the beginning and adores her. She is a bold lady who always supports her dear ones and is not hesitant to stand up against injustice. (2021–present)
- Tony Antony (2021) → Amith (2022) → Tony Antony as Anand
  - Madhuri's husband, Arjun's father and Arunima's brother. He is a successful businessman. Even though he appreciates Pooja's qualities, he is yet to come to terms with Arjun's marriage to her and still internally wishes his sister's daughter to be his daughter-in-law. (2022–present)
- Mohan Ayroor as Adv. Nandagopan Marar alias Nandan
  - Pooja's father and Arunima's husband; a successful lawyer and businessman. He was elated to unite with Priya (believing her to be Anu) after spending years in sorrow believing her to be dead. He shares a fatherly bond with Pooja though unaware of each other's identities. He still cares for Pooja and Arjun in spite of them betraying his supposed daughter. (2021–present)
- Shibu Laban as Vasanthan
  - Madhumita's henpecked husband; an unemployed amateur mimicry artist. He often teams up with Madhu and Priya to create confusion between Arjun and Pooja. (2021–present)
- Lakshmi Keerthana as Saayu
  - Arjun's sister. A college student who supports her brother's love marriage and adores Pooja. (2021–present)
- Maneesha Jayasingh (2021–22) → Alanteena (2022) → Maneesha Jayasingh as Sakshi
  - A criminal-minded businesswoman; Priya's ally. She wishes to buy Snehasadanam for opening a resort and frames a murder case against Vishwanathan to gain the plot. She shares a past rivalry with Arjun which involves the suicidal death of his best friend, Devan after Sakshi's love betrayal. (2023–present)
- Kiran as Georgekutty
  - Arjun's legal assistant. He is loyal and respects Arjun and Pooja and often assists them in the Snehasadanam issue. He advises Arjun about married life, despite being unmarried himself. (2021–present)
- Nandana Thulasi as Jeena
  - Pooja's best friend and colleague. She is the only person who knows about the truth of Pooja's marriage with Arjun. She shares a close bond with Pooja and finds Arjun's actions suspicious. (2021–present)
- Dr Jayan as Shankar Raman Marar
  - Nandagopan's younger brother. He pretends like a devoted younger brother to Nandan but is actually the one who plotted the accident that killed his brother's family twenty years back. His aim is to gain his brother's vast wealth after removing Priya from his way. (2021–present)
- Devendranath as Commissioner Hemachandran IPS
  - A corrupt police officer; Senapathi and Shankar's accomplice. (2023–present)
- Subhash Menon as Baiju Senapathi
  - A renowned politician and Sakshi's father who supports her criminal activities. He is also a friend of Shankar Ram and was an active member in planning Nandagopan and his family's accident. (2021; 2023–present)
- Pradeep Prabhakar as Dathan
  - Sneha's father and a friend of Anand. (2022–present)
- Indulekha as Geetha
  - Sneha's mother. (2022–present)
- Sethu Lakshmi as Meenakshiyamma
  - An inmate of Snehasadanam; Vasanthan's mother; Madhumita's mother-in-law. She was thrown out of her house by Madhu and was admitted to Snehasadanam by Pooja. (2021–present)
- Raghavan as Sabarmathi Vishwanathan
  - Pooja's foster-father and the establisher of the orphanage Snehasadanam Ashram. He was fakely accused of murder by Priya and Sakshi for claiming his plot containing the Ashram where they plan to open a resort. (2021–present)
- Sindhu Jacob (2021–2023) / Aparna Nair (2023) as Athira
  - Shankar's wife. She cares for her husband's family and grieves the tragedy that hit them. She is unaware of her husband's true face.
- Ranjith Raj as Jeevan
  - A fraudster hired by Priya and Shankar to create problems in Arjun's family by making Sayu fall in love with him. (2022)
- Alif Shah as SP Kiran Kumar IPS
  - A friend of Arjun who helps him in investigating the Theja murder case. (2022–present)
- Sandhya Manoj as Chandra Prabha IPS
  - An honest police officer. Arjun's nemesis turned friend who helps him with various cases. (2022–present)
- Shanthi Williams as Japan Rajeshwari
  - Maheshwari's younger sister who resides in Japan. (2023–present)
- Kottayam Rasheed as Paravila Pavithran
  - Priya's fake father (2023)
- Kavitha Lakshmi as Manikutty
  - Priya's fake mother (2023)
- Kochu Preman as Pankajakshan alias Panku
  - An inmate of Snehasadanam; Meenakshi's husband; Vasanthan's father; Madhu's father-in-law. He and his wife were thrown out of their house by Madhu and later reached Snehasadanam. (2021-2022)
- Amboori Jayan as Joseph
  - A driver hired by Shankar to murder Nandagopan's family. He later repents his action and dies after confessing the truth to Nandagopan and Pooja. (2021)
- Aneesh as Sajan
  - Sakshi's goon who was part of the group which disposed of Theja's dead body. He later teams up with Arjun, only to cheat him at the last moment. (2022)
- Venki as Harichand Theja
  - Priya's ex-boyfriend who was murdered by Sakshi for framing Vishwanathan. (2021)
- Nancy as Laali
  - An accomplice of Arjun who traps Vasanthan in a honey trap. (2022)
- Subeer Bavu as Sharath
  - A former inmate of Snehasadanam. (2021)
- Ashraf Pezhumoodu as Commissioner Padmakumar P IPS **A police officer who helps Nandagopan in tracking his family's murderer. (2021)
- Vinayak as Rahul
  - An ex-boyfriend of Priya with whom she breaks up because of his financial status. (2021)
- Sindhu Varma as Hema T.K
  - Madhuri's childhood friend who teams up with her to stage a drama to persuade Pooja and Arjun to have kids. (2022)
- Tom Jacob as Mahesh Manjalikulam
  - A man who gives charity donations in return for sexual favours from women. He repents his actions after getting a befitting reply from Pooja. (2022)
- Pala Aravindan as Padmanabhan
  - A farmer who provides accommodation for Arjun and Pooja when they get lost in a jungle. (2022)
- Kalady Omana as Annamma
  - Padmanabhan's wife. (2022)
- Anu Lakshmi as Shalini
  - A young girl who attempts suicide believing that her lover was cheating on her. Arjun donates blood to save her life which also paves the way for his first meeting with Pooja. (2022)
- Sreenath Swaminathan as Musafir
  - A friend of Arjun and Pooja during their honeymoon (2022)
- Vyshnavi Krishnajith as Reshmi
  - Pooja's friend. (2023)
- Satheesh Vettikkavala as Arjun's junior advocate (2021)
- Niya Renjith as Anjana, Hemachandran's sister, Aravindan's wife, Rani 's biological mother
- Sona Adam
- Landwin as Abhijith Aravindan
- ____ as Aravindan

=== Guest ===
- Baby Ameya as Young Anu
  - The Uppum Mulakum fame made a cameo appearance as a toddler Anu in the show's first episode. (2021)
- Haritha G Nair as Keerthi
  - Cameo appearance in promotional video as her character from soap opera Thinkalkalamaan. (2021)
- Shanthi Krishna as Herself
  - A fictionalized version of herself as a well-wisher of Pooja. She plays a crucial role in making Pooja and Arjun accept their love for each other. (2022)
- Stephy Leon as Bhavana
  - Cameo appearance as her character from soap opera Bhavana. She helps Pooja meet Arjun while he is hospitalised. (2022)

== Production ==
=== Development ===
The show's launch was planned for April 2021 but was delayed until November due to the COVID-19 pandemic. It was reported in October 2021, that Kaliveedu is an official remake of the popular Tamil soap opera Roja.

=== Filming ===
The series is mainly filmed Thiruvananthapuram and its whereabouts.

=== Casting ===
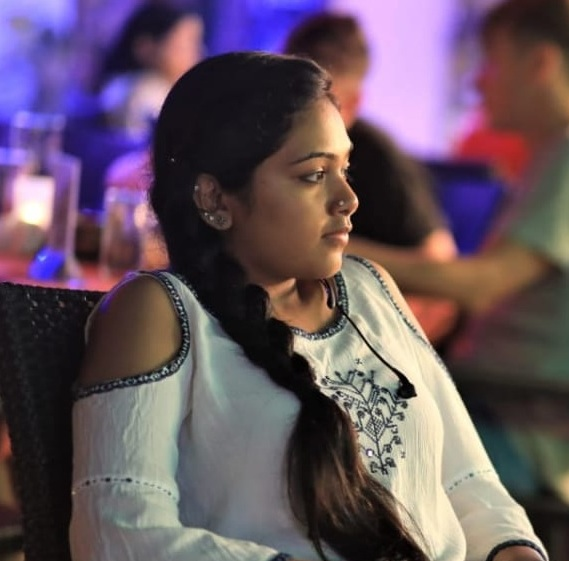
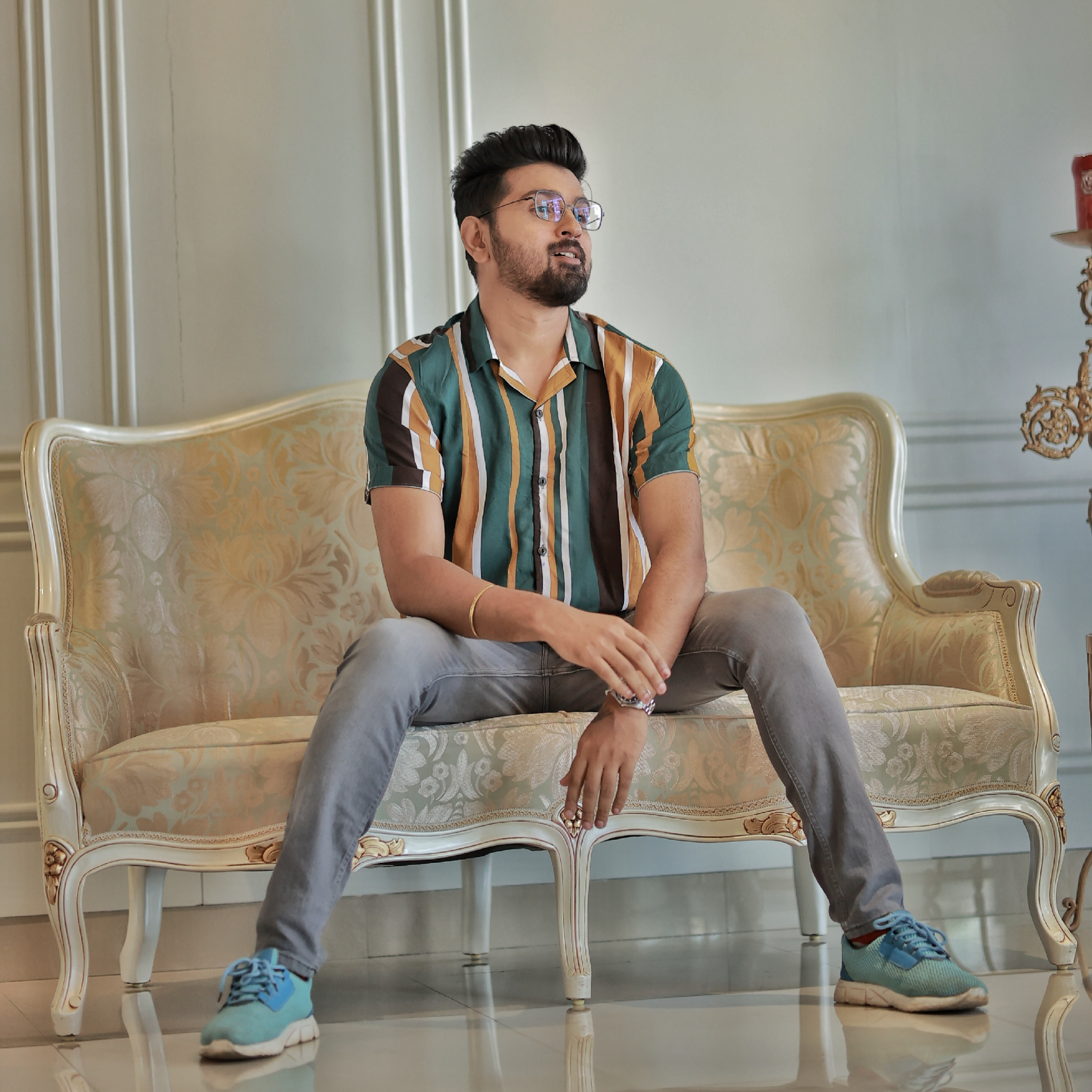
Rebecca Santhosh and Nithin Jake Joseph played the lead roles.

Rebecca Santhosh was cast as the protagonist while Nithin Jake Joseph was roped in to play the male lead. Uma Nair confirmed her presence in October 2021. Sreelatha Namboothiri, Tony, Krishna Prabha and Vijayalakshmi were also revealed to be part of the series. Subhash Menon, Mohan Ayroor, Gayathri Mayoora and Jeevan Gopal were also reportedly cast.

Neena Kurup and Baby Ameya made cameo appearances in the first episode. Veterans Sethu Lakshmi, Kochu Preman and Raghavan also featured in the show. In July 2022, Shanthi Krishna played a cameo appearance as herself. In July 2022, actress Stephy Leon as Bhavana from TV series Bhavana made an entry.

=== Release ===
The first promotional video of Kaliveedu featuring lead actress Rebecca Santhosh was released in September 2021. The show premiered on Surya TV on 15 November 2021. It is telecasted every day at the 9:00 p.m. (IST) time slot. On the digital platform, Kaliveedu is available for viewing on the app Sun NXT.

== Soundtrack ==
All music is composed by Saanand George.

Original Songs
No.	Title	Lyrics	Singer(s)	Length
1.	"Unarum Nilavu Polaval"	K Gireesh Kumar	Nimisha Kurupath, Satheesh Dev	1:08
2.	"Ponnoliyil Poothulayum"			3:01
Total length:				4:09

== Reception ==
The show received positive response from the audience. Kaliveedu secured 18% votes in an online poll conducted by ETimes nominating the best Malayalam TV show of 2022.

=== Critical response ===
Reviewing the first episode of the show for The Times of India, Radhika Nair thought the show had an "Interesting storyline but lacked lustre". She further wrote: "the show lacks an X-factor to leave the telly audiences wanting for more".

== Adaptations ==
Language	Title	Original release	Network(s)	Last aired	Notes	Ref.
Tamil	Roja ரோஜா	9 April 2018	Sun TV	3 December 2022	Original	
Kannada	Sevanthi ಸೇವಂತಿ	25 February 2019	Udaya TV	Ongoing	Remake	
Telugu	Roja రోజా	11 March 2019	Gemini TV	27 March 2020	Remake	
Hindi	Sindoor Ki Keemat सिंदूर की कीमत	18 October 2021	Dangal TV	29 April 2023	Remake	
Malayalam	Kaliveedu കളിവീട്	15 November 2021	Surya TV	22 September 2024	Remake	
Bengali	Saathi সাথী	7 February 2022	Sun Bangla	3 August 2024	Remake	
Marathi	Tharala Tar Mag! ठरलं तर मग!	5 December 2022	Star Pravah	Ongoing	Remake	
Odia	Tori pain To Pain	29 May 2023	Tarang TV	Ongoing	Remake	

== Awards ==
Award	Date of ceremony	Category	Nominee(s)	Result	Ref.
24 Frame Global Excellency Serial Award	25 May 2022	Best Actor	Nithin Jake Joseph	Won	
24 Frame Global Excellency Serial Award	25 May 2022	Best Actress	Rebecca Santhosh	Won	
16th Manappuram Minnalai Media Award	31 May 2022	Best Actress	Rebecca Santhosh	Won	
16th Manappuram Minnalai Media Award	31 May 2022	Best Supporting Actor	Mohan Ayroor	Won	
