= Jeevitha Nouka (TV series) =

Indian Malayalam television series

- Genre: Soap opera
- Written by: George Kattapana
- Directed by: G.R.Krishnan
- Creative directors: Sarin Babu, Krishnaprasad
- Opening theme: Sanand George
- Country of origin: India
- Original language: Malayalam
- No. of seasons: 1
- No. of episodes: 223

Production
- Executive producer: Rameez Kabeer
- Producer: Suresh Unnithan
- Cinematography: Baiju Gopal
- Editors: Ajay Prasannan, Rajesh Attukal
- Running time: 20–22 minutes

Original release
- Network: Mazhavil Manorama
- Release: 23 March 2020 – 26 March 2021

Jeevitha Nouka (English: The Boat of Life) is an Indian Malayalam television series premiered on Mazhavil Manorama since 23 March 2020 and streams on Manorama Max. The show was produced by Suresh Unnithan 's Sree Movies. Sajan Surya and Nithin Jake Joseph played the lead characters.

== Plot ==
Jeevitha Nouka takes a deep dive into the depths of relationships. It is an unforgettable lesson on overcoming the struggles of life while keeping one's loved ones close. The depth of brotherhood shared between Jayakrishnan and Harikrishnan is ruined when Meghna Reddy enters the Palakkal House as Hari's wife. She is actually Jayan's first wife Aswathy, who was kidnapped by Jayan's father Nadesan after realizing that she was pregnant with Jayan's child. Nadesan hated her because she was from a poor family. When Jayan went to Singapore for higher studies, Nadesan killed Aswathy's father in front of her own eyes and then kidnapped and tortured her. When she gave birth to a baby girl, Nadesan took the baby away from her and told her that he had killed it. Believing that Jayan betrayed her, Aswathy has returned as Meghna to take revenge, with the help of her guardian Swamiji. Jayan is tensed as his current wife, Sumithra, and the rest of the family do not know anything about Aswathy. The story moves forward as Meghna proceeds with her revenge and, one by one, the members of Palakkal family realize the truth. Finally, Meghna realizes that her daughter is in fact alive, and she is Malu, the adopted daughter of Jayan and Sumithra. She also realizes that Jayan is innocent. The story ends with Meghna committing suicide after killing Swamiji, while Jayan, Sumithra and Malu live happily ever after.

== Cast ==
=== Main cast ===
- Sajan Surya as Palakkal Jayakrishnan
- Anjana KR as Sumithra Jayakrishnan
- Win Sagar (episode 1-35) / Nithin Jake Joseph (episodes 40-223) as Palakkal Harikrishnan
- Jishin Mohan as Sudhi
- Maneesha Jayasingh as Meghna Reddy / Aswathy
- Subhash Nair as Arakkapparambil Prabhakaran, Priyanka's father
- Aswathy U Pillai(episodes 1-20) / Anjusha (episodes 21-35) / Pinky Kannan (episodes 36-223) as Priyanka

=== Recurring cast ===
- Karthika Kannan as Soudhamini, Nadesan's sister
- Anil K Sivaram as Palakkal Nadesan, Jayan and Hari's father
- Hariprashanth M.G as Karadippara Thampi, Sumithra's brother
- Kris Venugopal as Guruji
- Larry as Parameshwaran
- Krishnapriya as Meenakshi
- Vineetha Devadas
- Benny as Panchayath President
- Disney James as Murali, Soudamini's husband and Forest officer
- Jayakrishnan Narayan as Raghavan, Aswathy's father
- Ashwathy
- Ambika Mohan as Jaya-Hari's mother (Photo only)
