= Murder of Jeevitha Panippan =

2008 murder of a kindergarten teacher in Singapore

- Date: 7 July 2008
- Location: Ang Mo Kio, Singapore
- Outcome: Pathip convicted of murder and sentenced to death in 2010; Pathip's conviction reduced to manslaughter after his appeal in 2012; Pathip re-sentenced to 20 years' jail in 2012
- Deaths: Jeevitha Panippan (18)
- Convicted: Pathip Selvan Sugumaran (22)
- Verdict: High Court; Guilty of murder Court of Appeal; Guilty of manslaughter
- Convictions: Manslaughter
- Sentence: Death, later commuted to 20 years' imprisonment

On 7 July 2008, at Ang Mo Kio West Garden in Singapore, 22-year-old movement operator Pathip Selvan Sugumaran murdered his 18-year-old girlfriend and kindergarten teacher Jeevitha Panippan, who sustained 15 bodily injuries during the stabbing, and three of the wounds led to Jeevitha's death. Pathip was arrested and charged with murder.

Pathip was sentenced to death in November 2010, after the High Court rejected his defences of grave and sudden provocation and diminished responsibility and therefore convicted him of murder. Upon his appeal, however, the Court of Appeal found Pathip not guilty of murder, as they accepted that he was indeed being gravely provoked by Jeevitha's insults and it caused him to lose self-control and kill the victim. As a result, in August 2012, Pathip's death sentence and murder conviction were both set aside, and he was instead sentenced to 20 years' imprisonment for a lesser charge of manslaughter.

== Background of Pathip and Jeevitha ==
Pathip Selvan Sugumaran, alias Marsiling Baby or Woodlands Baby, was born in Singapore in 1986. Pathip was the second of four children in his family, and he had an older brother, a younger brother and a younger sister. Pathip's parents divorced when he was only five years old. From 1992 to 1996, Pathip and his two brothers lived at the Sri Ramakrishna Mission Boys’ Home after the divorce; Pathip also stayed with his maternal grandmother during his childhood. In the years leading up to the murder of Pathip's girlfriend in 2008, Pathip lived with his mother, stepfather and maternal grandparents.

Pathip completed his N-levels and graduated from secondary school before he enrolled in the Institute of Technical Education (ITE) and studied for a diploma in electrical engineering. However, he dropped out in his second year. Afterwards, Pathip served his mandatory two-year National Service as a fireman in the Singapore Civil Defence Force (SCDF) before he was discharged in January 2007. He would later go to work as a movement operator in his uncle's company.

In December 2007, through a mutual friend, Suresh, Pathip first met his girlfriend Jeevitha Panippan (also known as "Jeev" or "Ashley"), who was an 18-year-old kindergarten teacher studying for her O-levels as a private candidate. Pathip and Jeevitha were initially friends before this developed into a romantic relationship, and Pathip did not mind this even though he knew that Jeevitha had up to 16 boyfriends at the time he first met her. As they grew closer, Pathip eventually introduced Jeevitha to his family in April 2008, but Pathip's family disapproved of the couple's relationship. Additionally, Jeevitha often asked Pathip to give her money, and the couple's relationship strained the relationship between Pathip and his family. At one point, in May 2008, Pathip even deferred his application to enroll into a part-time course in Petroleum and Chemical Process Technology at ITE College East and gave Jeevitha the money meant for his own school fee.

== Fatal stabbing of Jeevitha ==
From May 2008 onwards, the relationship between Pathip and Jeevitha began to deteriorate, and they often got into arguments due to Jeevitha hanging out with multiple men and Pathip, who allegedly grew more possessive of Jeevitha, having caught her in bed several times with other male strangers. Often, they would reconcile each time it happened, and on many occasions, Pathip used a knife to threaten her and Jeevitha would apologize to him and seek forgiveness and the matter would come to a close. An ex-boyfriend of Jeevitha once heard from Jeevitha that Pathip had been possessive of her, and she accused Pathip for pressuring her to have sex with him. Jeevitha's god-brother and friends described Pathip as "possessive" and said he easily became "jealous" whenever he saw Jeevitha talking or hanging out with other males.

On one occasion, Jeevitha and Pathip had unprotected sex, and although Pathip assured Jeevitha that even if she got pregnant, as she feared, Pathip still loved her and would marry her. Jeevitha went to file a complaint to the police, falsely accusing Pathip of raping her. Shocked over this, Pathip did not go home after finding the policemen at his doorstep and tried to contact Jeevitha, although it was through a friend that Pathip got to hear what Jeevitha had to say. Jeevitha spoke with Pathip and promised to withdraw the complaint but she did not do so. According to Pathip, he went to approach Jeevitha's father and asked for his daughter's hand in marriage and told him about Jeevitha's police report, and her father asked to speak to his daughter first. Pathip later surrendered himself to the police and was subsequently released on bail, and the police warned him to keep out of contact with Jeevitha. Although the couple made up, Jeevitha continued to be unfaithful to Pathip and continued to hang out with other men.

Pathip decided to marry Jeevitha, and as a sign of his sincerity, he bought Jeevitha a gold chain for her to wear. On 7 July 2008, a day after he once again caught Jeevitha together with a man in a red shirt (he chanced upon them when visiting his girlfriend), Pathip visited Jeevitha's mother and asked for her approval, telling her how much he loved Jeevitha and wanted to be her husband, and also told Jeevitha's mother how much he had changed from a former gang member to a better person after meeting Jeevitha. According to Jeevitha's mother, she was satisfied with Pathip as a potential son-in-law after observing his "quiet and very courteous" character and sincerity.

On that same day, after talking to Jeevitha's mother and meeting Jeevitha (then accompanied by her mother) at a coffee shop in Bishan, Pathip and Jeevitha went outdoors together and neared Ang Mo Kio West Garden. Before meeting Jeevitha, Pathip bought a knife and planned to use it to threaten Jeevitha into telling him who the man in the red shirt was, and make her apologize to him. He also bought a Winnie The Pooh correction tape as a reconciliation gift for Jeevitha as he also wished to reconcile with her. However, when Pathip confronted her after the couple reached a power substation opposite a HDB block at Ang Mo Kio West Garden, Jeevitha told Pathip that her new lover was much better than Pathip in having sex with her.

These insults caused Pathip to stab Panippan to death. After murdering Jeevitha, Pathip removed the gold chain he had gifted her from her neck and kissed her on the cheek, and he left the scene. The body of Jeevitha was discovered the next morning.

According to Dr George Paul, who conducted an autopsy on the victim, he found that Jeevitha sustained a total of 15 stab wounds on her body, and three of them (located at the neck, left chest and left shoulder) had penetrated the heart, left lung, pancreas, stomach and neck, and these three injuries were sufficient in the ordinary course of nature to cause death; it appeared that the victim was severely maimed during the stabbing. Jeevitha's corpse was cremated at Mandai Crematorium after a short funeral, with friends and family members attending the wake.

== Pathip's arrest ==
After he stabbed Jeevitha to death, Pathip immediately fled the country and went into hiding at Johor Bahru in neighboring Malaysia. Before that, he took a taxi to Woodlands and asked his mother to meet up with him and bring him a fresh set of clothes. Pathip and his mother took a taxi to Malaysia together and crossed the Woodlands Checkpoint. Pathip later parted ways with his mother, who returned to Singapore alone. A day later, Pathip contacted his family (who had all received word of Jeevitha's murder), stating that he wanted to die, but after Pathip's mother persuaded her son that she did not want him to live as a fugitive, Pathip agreed to surrender. He headed to the Woodlands Checkpoint, where he voluntarily gave himself up for the crime, and was detained by Singaporean authorities.

On 10 July 2008, three days after the crime, 22-year-old Pathip Selvan Sugumaran was officially charged with murdering 18-year-old Jeevitha Panippan. Under Section 302 of the Singaporean Penal Code, any offender found guilty of murder would be sentenced to death by hanging.

== Murder trial of Pathip ==
On 2 November 2009, 23-year-old Pathip Selvan Sugumaran officially stood trial for the murder of Jeevitha Panippan. Pathip was represented by Singapore's most famous criminal lawyer, Subhas Anandan, and Sunil Sudheesan, Anandan's nephew, while the prosecution was led by Ng Cheng Thiam and Chan Huimin, and the trial was presided over by Justice Kan Ting Chiu of the High Court.

The trial court was told about the tumultuous relationship between Pathip and Jeevitha, and the circumstances that led to Pathip killing Jeevitha. Pathip did not deny that he killed Jeevitha but he raised a two-tier defence against the murder charge. The first was grave and sudden provocation; Pathip's lawyers argued that prior to the murder, the remarks that Jeevitha uttered to Pathip about him being inferior to her new lover were particularly hurtful and provocative and had caused Pathip to lose his self-control, causing him to kill Jeevitha in a fit of anger. They argued that Pathip never had the intention to kill or cause fatal injuries to Jeevitha since he had plans to marry Jeevitha and was willing to forgive her, and even bought her a new correction tape with a cartoon sticker as a gift to mark their reconciliation. The knife was allegedly not meant to cause harm but to merely threaten her into seeking forgiveness, but this went awry with the change of circumstances. However, the prosecution argued that Jeevitha's acts could not have been particularly provocative and Pathip still could exercise self-control, and had deliberately attacked Jeevitha. The prosecution thus asked that the defence of sudden and grave provocation be rejected, and they also argued during their cross-examination of Pathip that his mind could not have "gone blank" when he killed Jeevitha, as he mentioned in a statement that he heard Jeevitha screaming and telling him "I love you" before she died.

The second tier of Pathip's defence was diminished responsibility, and Pathip's mental state was heavily debated between both sides. Dr Tommy Tan, a psychiatrist in private practice, represented the defence and stated that Pathip had attention deficit hyperactivity disorder (ADHD), based on his childhood behaviour and general performance in school and the interviews of Pathip's friends and family members, who all stated that he was short tempered and forgot about stuff whenever he was angry; Pathip's uncle also stated that his nephew had a good work performance but often got into fights during soccer matches, and even Pathip's two supervisors at his uncle's company vouched for his good work performance. Pathip's primary school report stated that he displayed “isolated instances of anger management issues”, while Pathip's secondary school report said that he was playful and restless, easily distracted and dreamy, and that his attitude towards teachers and school authority was indifferent. However, Dr Joshua Kua, a government psychiatrist who represented the prosecution, disagreed with Dr Tan's diagnosis and stated that Pathip did not suffer from any abnormality of the mind. Despite his findings, Dr Kua did not dispute that Pathip truly harboured deep affection for Jeevitha.

On 12 November 2010, a year after Pathip stood trial and having heard the case for 11 days, Justice Kan Ting Chiu delivered his verdict. He found that Pathip's defence of grave and sudden provocation should not be accepted, and he explained that the insults may be hurtful to anyone who heard it if placed in the shoes of Pathip, but he felt that the provocation caused by the insults was not particularly grave or sudden enough for Pathip to lose his self-control and kill Jeevitha under an uncontrollable fit of anger; his claim that his mind had "gone blank" was not consistent with his conduct at the time of the stabbing. Justice Kan similarly rejected the other defence of diminished responsibility, finding that Dr Kua's evidence was more objective and believable, and Dr Tan's diagnosis of ADHD should not be relied on.

Having rejected Pathip's defences and finding that Pathip had intentionally stabbed Jeevitha, such that the injuries inflicted were sufficient in the ordinary course of nature to cause death, Justice Kan found Pathip guilty of murder and convicted him pursuant to Section 300(c) of the Penal Code, sentencing Pathip to the mandatory death penalty. While Pathip was calm during sentencing, Pathip's family members and friends were reportedly shocked and wept at the judgement. Anandan confirmed soon after the ruling that he would appeal against his client's conviction and sentence.

== Appeal and reprieve ==
In May 2011, seven months after Pathip was sentenced to hang, his appeal was heard before the Court of Appeal. Pathip's lawyer Subhas Anandan argued on behalf of Pathip that the trial judge had erred in convicting Pathip of murder. He brought the court's attention to Pahtip's plan to reconcile with his girlfriend before the murder, and stated that the defence of sudden and grave provocation should be accepted since the murder happened as a result of Jeevitha inflicting cold-hearted and cruel insults to her boyfriend, causing Pathip to feel hurt and angry and hence killed her while losing control of himself, and Anandan therefore asked that the murder conviction should not stand.

In July 2012, while Pathip was still appealing against his conviction, the Singapore government announced that they would be introducing amendments in early 2013 to the death penalty laws in Singapore, mainly the introduction of life imprisonment as a minimum punishment for certain degrees of murder and for drug couriers who were convicted of capital drug trafficking. The government also extended a moratorium on all 35 death sentences in Singapore as there was a chance for the prisoners on death row in Singapore to appeal for a reduction of their death sentences. Pathip, who was among these 35 prisoners - 28 for drug trafficking and seven (including Pathip) for murder - on death row, foresaw a potential chance to escape the gallows once the law took effect in 2013, although his appeal against conviction was still processed for hearing at the time of the announcement.

On 15 August 2012, the Court of Appeal delivered their judgment in Pathip's appeal. The appellate court's three judges - Chief Justice Chan Sek Keong, and two Judges of Appeal Andrew Phang and V. K. Rajah - unanimously found that Pathip should not be convicted of murder, given that the defence of sudden and grave provocation was successfully raised but wrongfully rejected by the original trial judge Kan Ting Chiu. Explaining their reasons to accept the defence of grave and sudden provocation, Justice Rajah pronounced on behalf of the judges that the verbal insults which Jeevitha cruelly uttered in cold blood at her boyfriend was reasonably provocative, as Pathip harboured a great amount of passionate feelings for Jeevitha and also planned to marry her regardless of her unfaithfulness, and these malicious words (coupled with Jeevitha's persistent behaviour of cheating on Pathip) might have, more than possible, caused Pathip to lose his self-control in the moment of anger and hence stabbed her to death. The judges also agreed that with the principles laid by the 1998 precedent case of Kwan Cin Cheng, a Malaysian who was convicted of the manslaughter of his girlfriend in 1996 due to sudden and grave provocation, the provocation inflicted upon Pathip was indeed grave and sudden, if considered in the mental background of Pathip and in his position. Through the case of Kwan, who was given a life sentence for the killing, the Court of Appeal had ruled back in 1998 that even words could cause a person to suffer from sudden and grave provocation when killing their victim in a fit of uncontrollable anger.

Describing the killing of Jeevitha as "a tragic case of a young couple who had a bitter-sweet relationship that culminated in a homicide", the Court of Appeal concluded that "in the heat of the moment and in the context of the unfortunate couple’s overwhelming emotional turbulence", Pathip had killed Jeevitha under circumstances that fell short of murder as induced by grave and sudden provocation. The second defence of diminished responsibility, however, was still rejected by the appellate court as they accepted the prosecution's psychiatric report and also determined that, even if Pathip had ADHD, his mental responsibility was not diminished. On these grounds, the Court of Appeal found Pathip not guilty of murder and acquitted him, and also overturned the death penalty. Pathip was instead convicted of a lesser charge of culpable homicide not amounting to murder, also known as manslaughter in Singaporean legal terms. The punishment stipulated for manslaughter was either life imprisonment or alternatively, a fixed jail term of 20 years or less, with a possible fine or caning.

On 22 August 2012, Pathip's re-sentencing trial was convened at the Court of Appeal before the same three judges. Pathip's lawyer Sunil Sudheesan argued that Pathip should be given a jail term of ten years, stating that the killing was not premeditated and Pathip had lost his self-control as a result of Jeevitha's derisive comments. The prosecution, however, pointed out that Pathip had planned the meeting beforehand and even armed himself with a knife before the incident, and asked for a higher sentence due to the aggravating factors of his case.

On the same day itself, the Court of Appeal delivered their decision, sentencing Pathip to 20 years' jail. Chief Justice Chan stated that they agreed with the prosecution that Pathip had planned the meeting beforehand and even armed himself with a knife, which "heightened the risk of something disastrous happening", and he described Pathip as an individual prone to violent outbursts when provoked and he was a danger to society in many ways. For this, the appellate court found it was necessitated that Pathip should be "put away for a long time", and hence ordered Pathip to serve 20 years in prison, with the sentence backdated to the date of his arrest.

According to Anandan, who was absent from the re-sentencing hearing due to his hospitalization, he wrote in his book that the Court of Appeal had originally wanted to sentence Pathip to the maximum sentence of life imprisonment for the manslaughter charge, but after hearing Sudheesan's mitigation plea that a life sentence would be too harsh in light of the circumstances, the Court of Appeal agreed to not impose a life term and instead, they opted for the second-highest punishment of 20 years in jail.

== Aftermath ==
After Pathip's death sentence was revoked altogether with the initial murder conviction, 34 death row inmates were left awaiting execution in Singapore as of October 2012. In January 2013, the new death penalty laws officially took effect, removing the mandatory death penalty and introduced life imprisonment as a minimum sentence for murder offenses that did not carry the intention to kill under Sections 300(b) to 300(d), and the inmates on death row for such crimes were given a chance to be re-sentenced. Pathip was originally convicted of a Section 300(c) murder charge, which would have provided him a potential chance to escape the gallows if his appeal against conviction had been unsuccessful.

In 2014, Prathip's former lawyer Subhas Anandan's book The Best I Could was adapted into a two-season television series, which featured his former cases. The case of Jeevitha's murder and Pathip's trial was featured as the eighth episode of the show's second season. The difference was, Pathip's case was not featured in the book as his trial was still ongoing at the time when Anandan first published his book in 2009. Anandan, who was interviewed in the show, spoke about Pathip's case and explained that like in Pathip's case, a defence of grave and sudden provocation should only stand if an act or verbal remark was particularly provocative in view of the mental background of the accused and circumstances revolving around the event, and he found that Pathip indeed truly loved Jeevitha but it was unfortunate that Jeevitha never cared for him as much as Pathip did, and Pathip was full of contrition and remorse for what happened.

In October 2015, Anandan's second and last book, titled It's Easy to Cry, was published nine months after Anandan died from a heart attack (although he completed writing his book before his death at age 67). Anandan, who was reported to have dictated the contents of his book while undergoing kidney dialysis, recounted the case of Pathip, stating that when he first came across the case, Pathip's parents sought his help to represent Pathip, as they came from Marsiling while Anandan came from Sembawang, and Marsiling was formerly a part of Sembawang, where Anandan was a well-known lawyer, and people from Marsiling or Sembawang often came to Anandan for help whenever they or their loved ones got into trouble with the law. Pathip's parents reportedly pleaded with Anandan to not let their son hang for murder even though they understood he had done wrong. Pathip had once told Anandan that he regretted his actions and was willing to face the death sentence for murdering Jeevitha as she was the only girl he ever loved and he was also prepared to face any other consequences for the crime.

Since 2012, Pathip was serving his 20-year sentence at Changi Prison, with the jail term backdated to the date of his arrest in July 2008. With the possibility of parole for good behaviour, Pathip would be released in November 2021 after completing at least two-thirds of his jail term (equivalent to 13 years and four months).

== See also ==
- Murder of Phang Ai Looi
- Capital punishment in Singapore
- List of major crimes in Singapore
