= Radhika (TV series) =

Indian Kannada-language soap opera

- Genre: Soap opera; Family; Drama
- Created by: Udaya TV
- Inspired by: Kayal
- Screenplay by: Udaya TV
- Story by: Udaya TV; Dialogues: Turuvekere Prasad
- Directed by: Dharshit Bhat Balavalli
- Starring: Tejaswini Shekar; Sharath Kshatriya
- Country of origin: India
- Original language: Kannada
- No. of seasons: 1
- No. of episodes: 939

Production
- Camera setup: Multi-camera
- Running time: 20–22 minutes
- Production company: Sri Durga Creations

Original release
- Network: Udaya TV
- Release: 14 March 2022 – 29 March 2025

Related
- Kayal

Radhika is a 2022-2025 Indian-Kannada language Family drama which premiered on Udaya TV on 14 March 2022 and ended on 29 March 2025. The show is an official remake of Tamil serial Kayal. It stars Tejaswini Shekar and Sharath Kshatriya in lead roles.

== Cast ==
=== Main ===
- Kavya Shastry / Tejaswini Shekar as Radhika
- Sharath Kshatriya as Chiranth

=== Supporting ===
- Ravikumar as Kariappa
- Malathi Sirdeshpande as Janaki
- Suresh Rai
- Savitha Krishnamurthy
- Shwetha Rao / Supriya Rao as Sunayana
- Sunil as Kashi
- Jeevan / Praveen as Kalki
- Rekha Sagar
- Inchara Shetty as Gamya
- Priya Darshini as Ramya
- Dhriya Adithya
- Murthy as Vignesh
- Rekha Das as Rajeshwari

== Production ==
=== Casting ===
Nandini serial fame Kavya Shastry was cast in the female lead role as Radhika and Sharath Kshatriya was cast in the male lead role as Chiranth.
